= Baseball at the 2011 Pan American Games – Team squads =

Participating teams were required to notify COPAG of their final team rosters by September 14, a month before the Games began.

== Group A ==
=== Mexico ===
Manager: (Mexico) Mario Mendoza

The following are the 23 players that represented Mexico.

Pos.	No.	Player	Date of birth (age)	Bats	Throws	Club
P	9	Jorge Luis Castillo	3 November 1981 (aged 29)	Left	Left	(Mexico) Guerreros de Oaxaca
P	91	Rafael Díaz	12 December 1970 (aged 40)	Right	Right	(Mexico) Saraperos de Saltillo
P	56	Marco Duarte	19 August 1986 (aged 25)	Right	Right	(Mexico) Diablos Rojos del México
P	36	Alan Guerrero	14 November 1987 (aged 23)	Right	Right	(Mexico) Broncos de Reynosa
P	46	Juan Pablo Menchaca	28 November 1987 (aged 23)	Right	Right	(Mexico) Sultanes de Monterrey
P	12	Héctor Navarro	29 August 1979 (aged 32)	Right	Right	(Mexico) Rojos del Águila de Veracruz
P	35	Daniel Rodríguez	11 December 1984 (aged 26)	Left	Left	(Mexico) Saraperos de Saltillo
P	39	Walter Silva	4 January 1977 (aged 34)	Right	Right	(Mexico) Sultanes de Monterrey
P	17	Marco Tovar	31 December 1988 (aged 22)	Right	Left	(Mexico) Broncos de Reynosa
P	18	Rolando Valdez	8 December 1985 (aged 25)	Right	Right	(Mexico) Guerreros de Oaxaca
P	45	Sergio Valenzuela	September 15, 1984 (aged 27)	Right	Right	(Mexico) Guerreros de Oaxaca
C	10	Mario Iván Santana	23 April 1976 (aged 35)	Right	Right	(Mexico) Olmecas de Tabasco
C	22	Alí Solís	29 September 1987 (aged 24)	Right	Right	(United States) San Diego Padres (minors)
IF	19	José Álvarez	7 February 1989 (aged 22)	Right	Right	(United States) Los Angeles Angels of Anaheim (minors)
IF	24	Jorge Guzmán	28 November 1983 (aged 27)	Left	Right	(Mexico) Rojos del Águila de Veracruz
IF	68	Walter Ibarra	11 January 1977 (aged 34)	Switch	Right	(United States) New York Yankees (minors)
IF	7	Maxwell León	27 June 1984 (aged 27)	Switch	Right	(Mexico) Petroleros de Minatitlán
IF	50	Agustín Murillo	5 May 1982 (aged 29)	Right	Right	(Mexico) Sultanes de Monterrey
OF	2	Albino Contreras	30 April 1980 (aged 31)	Right	Right	(Mexico) Tigres de Quintana Roo
OF	40	Sergio Omar Gastélum	19 October 1978 (aged 33)	Right	Right	(Mexico) Guerreros de Oaxaca
OF	8	Leo Heras	29 May 1990 (aged 21)	Left	Right	(Mexico) Diablos Rojos del México
OF	55	Rogelio Noris	3 December 1989 (aged 21)	Right	Right	(United States) Pittsburgh Pirates (minors)
OF	14	Ramón Ríos	3 April 1988 (aged 23)	Right	Right	(Mexico) Sultanes de Monterrey

=== Panama ===
2 ACOSTA Alberto P 1.95/6'5" 81.6/180 R L 25 AUG 1975
3 VEGA Jonathan OF L R 3 FEB 1979
4 GONZALEZ David C 1.80/5'11" 108.8/240 R R 16 JAN 1979
5 BETHANCOURT Euclides P R L 23 NOV 1980
9 MACIAS Jose IF L L 25 JAN 1972
10 MUÑOZ Carlos C 1.72/5'8" R R 16 OCT 1979
11 PATIÑO Jeffer IF 1.76/5'9" 80.2/177 R L 8 OCT 1988
14 CASTRO Yeliar P R L 7 JUL 1989
15 BISHOP Jorge IF R R 7 JUL 1989
16 NAVARRO Eliecer P 1.83/6'0" 86.0/190 L L 26 OCT 1987
20 RODRIGUEZ Concepcion OF R R 19 SEP 1986
21 QUINTERO Cesar C 1.87/6'2" 99.7/220 L R 19 MAR 1981
22 CHAVEZ Angel IF 1.93/6'4" 95.2/210 R R 6 APR 1983
23 QUIROZ Carlos IF 1.84/6'0" 102.5/226 R R 30 NOV 1985
24 RIVERA Adolfo OF L R 5 MAR 1982
27 ATENCIO Abraham P L L 16 FEB 1969
34 GONZALEZ Saul P 1.85/6'1" 95.2/210 R L 19 SEP 1988
39 GONZALEZ Gustavo P 1.82/6'0" 60.0/132 L L 13 MAY 1986
42 GOMEZ Gustavo P R L 24 MAY 1991
45 MACHUCA Luis P 1.85/6'1" 92.9/205 R L 16 MAR 1988
71 MORENO Francis Eloy P 1.90/6'3" 108.8/240 R L 11 OCT 1985
77 CASTILLO Javier IF 1.95/6'5" 108.8/240 R R 29 AUG 1983
81 MENDEZ Gilberto P 1.86/6'1" 98.0/216 R L 15 NOV 1974
Manager: 19 IBARRA Miguel
Coaches: BARE Amadeo
40 HERNANDEZ Claudino
59 MALDONADO Carlos
88 LEAVER Alberto

=== United States ===
Manager: (United States) Ernie Young

Pos.	No.	Player	Date of birth (age)	Bats	Throws	Club
P	17	Pete Andrelczyk	November 10, 1985 (age 40)			(United States) Florida Marlins (AAA)
P	23	Jeff Beliveau	January 17, 1987 (age 39)			(United States) Chicago Cubs (AA)
OF	24	Brett Carroll	October 3, 1982 (age 43)			(United States) Boston Red Sox (AAA)
P	14	Justin Cassel	September 25, 1984 (age 41)			(United States) Chicago White Sox (AAA)
OF	46	Matt Clark	December 10, 1986 (age 39)			(United States) San Diego Padres (AAA)
OF	15	Jordan Danks	August 7, 1986 (age 39)			(United States) Chicago White Sox (AAA)
P	18	Chuckie Fick	November 20, 1985 (age 40)			(United States) St. Louis Cardinals (AAA)
IF	48	Jim Gallagher	September 3, 1985 (age 40)			(United States) Chicago White Sox (AAA)
IF	2	Andrew Garcia	April 22, 1986 (age 40)			(United States) Chicago White Sox (AAA)
C	7	Tuffy Gosewisch	August 17, 1983 (age 42)			(United States) Philadelphia Phillies (AA)
OF	6	Brett Jackson	August 2, 1988 (age 37)			(United States) Chicago Cubs (AAA)
P	35	Jeff Marquez	August 10, 1984 (age 41)			(United States) New York Yankees (AAA)
C	16	James McCann	June 13, 1990 (age 36)			(United States) Detroit Tigers (A)
IF	26	Tommy Mendonca	April 12, 1988 (age 38)			(United States) Texas Rangers (AA)
IF	4	Jordy Mercer	August 27, 1986 (age 39)			(United States) Pittsburgh Pirates (AAA)
P	49	Scott Patterson	June 20, 1979 (age 47)			(United States) Seattle Mariners (AAA)
OF	25	A. J. Pollock	December 5, 1987 (age 38)			(United States) Arizona Diamondbacks (AA)
P	34	Todd Redmond	May 17, 1985 (age 41)			(United States) Atlanta Braves (AAA)
P	29	Matt Shoemaker	September 27, 1986 (age 39)			(United States) Los Angeles Angels (AA)
P	38	Drew Smyly	June 13, 1989 (age 37)			(United States) Detroit Tigers (AA)
IF	30	Joe Thurston	September 29, 1979 (age 46)			(United States) Florida Marlins (AAA)
IF	28	Chad Tracy	July 4, 1985 (age 40)			(United States) Texas Rangers (AAA)
P	45	Andy Van Hekken	July 31, 1979 (age 46)			(United States) Houston Astros (AAA)
P	47	Randy Williams	September 18, 1975 (age 50)			(United States) Boston Red Sox (AAA)

=== Dominican Republic ===
1 CRUZ Enrique P/IF 1.85/6'1" 81.6/180 R R 21 NOV 1981
4 CESAR Dionys OF 1.85/6'1" 88.5/195 R S 27 SEP 1973
6 RICHARDSON Juan IF 1.85/6'1" 97.5/215 R R 27 NOV 1979
7 CASTILLO Silvio Alexander C 1.89/6'2" 88.5/195 R R 29 NOV 1985
8 CAMPUSANO Jose OF 1.80/5'11" 81.6/180 R S 19 DEC 1983
9 GONZALEZ Angel IF 1.83/6'0" 88.0/194 R S 28 DEC 1985
14 DE LA CRUZ Cristopher IF 1.83/6'0" 81.6/180 R S 5 MAR 1982
15 NOVOA Yunior P 1.95/6'5" 81.6/180 L L 9 NOV 1984
17 GOMEZ Alexis OF 1.89/6'2" 88.5/195 L L 8 AUG 1978
19 SALAS Juan P 1.89/6'2" 86.2/190 R R 11 JUL 1979
20 CRUZ Rafael P 1.98/6'6" 104.3/230 R R 19 MAY 1977
22 PEÑA Juan Antonio P 1.89/6'2" 81.6/180 L L 12 APR 1977
23 FORTUNATO Bartolome P 1.85/6'1" 83.9/185 R R 24 AUG 1974
26 CRUZETA Francisco P 1.89/6'2" 97.5/215 R R 7 APR 1981
27 HERNÁNDEZ Runelvys P 1.92/6'4" 90.7/200 R R 27 APR 1978
28 VERAS Dario P 1.83/6'0" 77.1/170 R R 13 MAR 1973
29 SANCHEZ Danilo C 1.80/5'11" 104.3/230 R R 25 OCT 1980
34 DURAN Logan P 1.89/6'2" 84.4/186 R R 8 DEC 1981
38 HERNÁNDEZ Francisco C 1.83/6'0" 90.7/200 R S 2 APR 1986
39 OTAÑEZ Willis IF 1.85/6'1" 90.7/200 R R 19 APR 1973
45 ALVAREZ YSABEL Mario P 1.85/6'1" 86.2/190 R R 26 MAR 1984
49 NOVOA PEÑA Roberto P 1.98/6'6" 90.7/200 R R 15 AUG 1979
50 MENDEZ Victor OF 1.80/5'11" 90.7/200 R S 28 JUN 1980
81 CASTRO Bernabet IF 1.78/5'10" 77.1/170 R S 14 JUN 1979
Manager: 30 GONZALEZ Denio
Coaches: 24 CANO Joselito
25 BRITO Domingo Antonio
99 RIJO Rafael

== Group B ==
=== Puerto Rico ===
3 FIGUEROA Luis Rafael IF L S 22 SEP 1970
10 FUENTES Reymond OF L R 12 FEB 1991
17 VALENTIN Jose U L L 19 SEP 1976
19 VAZQUEZ Christian C L R 21 AUG 1990
20 FLORES Adalberto P L L 11 APR 1986
22 SOTO Neftali IF L R 16 DEC 1984
23 FELICIANO Jesus P L L 6 JUN 1979
26 RODRIGUEZ Julio E. P R L 29 AUG 1990
29 CANDELARIA Antonio IF R R 13 OCT 1981
31 ORTIZ Wilberto I. IF L R 30 JAN 1985
34 CRESPO Cesar A. OF L S 23 MAY 1979
35 DOMINGUEZ Jeffry IF L R 31 JUL 1986
38 SANTIAGO Andres M. P R R 26 OCT 1989
39 DE LA TORRE Jose P R L 17 OCT 1985
41 TORRES Joseph P L L 9 MAR 1982
42 MALDONADO Ivan P R L 7 JUN 1980
43 SOTO Yariel C R R 29 OCT 1988
49 DIAZ Juan C. IF R R 21 JUN 1986
50 SANTIAGO Tomas P R L 30 OCT 1981
55 BOCACHICA Hiram OF L R 3 APR 1976
61 FUENTES Nelvin P R R 4 JUL 1989
62 PADILLA Juan Miguel P R L 29 MAR 1973
65 NIEVES Efrain Javier P L L 14 APR 1978
77 MEJIAS Miguel P R R 4 JUL 1989

=== Cuba ===
1 DUVERGEL Giorvis OF L L 9 AUG 1979
10 GOURRIEL Yulieski IF R R 6 SEP 1984
11 ALARCON Yosvany C R R 15 OCT 1984
12 ENRIQUEZ Michel IF R R 2 NOV 1979
13 PESTANO Ariel Osvaldo C R R 31 JAN 1974
15 ALVAREZ Freddy Asiel P R L 29 APR 1989
16 SOTO Alberto Cesar P R R 18 JUN 1988
23 ODELIN Vicyohandri P R L 26 FEB 1980
24 CEPEDA Frederich OF R S 4 AUG 1980
27 MARTINEZ Jonder P R L 22 JUN 1978
28 OLIVERA Hector IF R R 4 MAY 1985
32 GONZALEZ Norberto P L L 10 OCT 1979
38 CASTILLO Rusney OF R R 7 SEP 1987
42 LAHERA Miguel P R L 24 JAN 1985
45 MOREJON Frank Camilo C R R 25 JAN 1986
48 GONZALEZ Yulieski P L L 20 JUN 1980
50 REYES Rudith IF R R 11 MAY 1979
54 DESPAIGNE Alfredo OF R R 17 JUN 1986
62 PEDROSO Yadier P R L 4 SEP 1986
71 ARRUEBARRUENA Erisbel IF R R 25 MAR 1990
75 GONZALEZ Miguel Alfredo P R L 23 SEP 1986
79 ABREU Jose Dariel IF R R 29 JAN 1987
88 BELL Alexeis OF R R 10 FEB 1983
94 HINOJOSA Dalier P R L 2 OCT 1986
Manager: 8 URQUIOLA Alfonso
Coaches: 49 GALVEZ Juan Javier
57 MEDINA Jose Roberto
60 AGUIAR Ronny
82 HERNANDEZ Jose Eumelio

=== Canada ===
Manager: (Canada) Ernie Whitt

Pos.	No.	Player	Date of birth (age)	Bats	Throws	Club
P	27	Andrew Albers	October 6, 1985 (age 40)			(United States) Minnesota Twins (AA)
C	28	Cole Armstrong	August 24, 1983 (age 42)			(United States) Los Angeles Angels of Anaheim (AAA)
IF	16	Chris Bisson	August 14, 1989 (age 36)			(United States) San Diego Padres (A)
IF	32	Shawn Bowman	December 9, 1984 (age 41)			(United States) Atlanta Braves (AAA)
P	22	Nick Bucci	January 16, 1990 (age 36)			(United States) Milwaukee Brewers (A)
OF	31	Michael Crouse	November 22, 1990 (age 35)			(Canada) Toronto Blue Jays (A)
IF	17	Emerson Frostad	January 13, 1983 (age 43)			(United States) Houston Astros (AAA)
P	38	Mark Hardy	May 3, 1988 (age 38)			(United States) San Diego Padres (A)
P	19	Jimmy Henderson	October 21, 1982 (age 43)			(United States) Milwaukee Brewers (AAA)
P	40	Shawn Hill	April 28, 1981 (age 45)			Free agent
P	20	Jay Johnson	December 21, 1989 (age 36)			(United States) Philadelphia Phillies (A)
P	10	Mike Johnson	October 3, 1975 (age 50)			Free agent
P	21	Chris Kissock	May 2, 1985 (age 41)			(United States) Philadelphia Phillies (AA)
OF	18	Brock Kjeldgaard	January 22, 1986 (age 40)			(United States) Milwaukee Brewers (AA)
OF	23	Marcus Knecht	June 21, 1990 (age 36)			(Canada) Toronto Blue Jays (A)
P	24	Kyle Lotzkar	October 24, 1989 (age 36)			(United States) Cincinnati Reds (A)
IF	11	Jonathan Malo	September 23, 1983 (age 42)			(United States) New York Mets (AA)
P	35	Dustin Molleken	August 21, 1984 (age 41)			(United States) Colorado Rockies (AAA)
P	48	Scott Richmond	August 30, 1979 (age 46)			(Canada) Toronto Blue Jays (AAA)
C	30	Chris Robinson	May 12, 1985 (age 41)			(United States) Chicago Cubs (AAA)
OF	26	Jamie Romak	September 30, 1985 (age 40)			(United States) Kansas City Royals (AA)
OF	14	Tim Smith	June 14, 1986 (age 40)			(United States) Kansas City Royals (AA)
IF	7	Skyler Stromsmoe	March 30, 1984 (age 42)			(United States) San Francisco Giants (AA)
IF	29	Jimmy Van Ostrand	August 7, 1984 (age 41)			(United States) Houston Astros (AA)

=== Venezuela ===
4 GRANADILLO Antonio Jose IF 1.80/5'11" 86.0/190 R R 8 OCT 1983
5 LUQUE Roger P 1.78/5'10" 84.0/185 L L 8 JAN 1980
7 APONTE Juan C 1.86/6'1" 90.0/198 R R 2 MAR 1988
9 ANGULO Oscar David IF 1.77/5'10" 78.0/172 R R 2 JAN 1984
10 CARDONA Rodolfo IF 1.76/5'9" 76.0/168 R R 27 NOV 1986
15 COLMENAREZ Juan P 1.79/5'10" 82.0/181 L L 22 OCT 1986
17 SIVIRA Yonathan OF 1.78/5'10" 78.0/172 R R 25 JAN 1984
18 VASQUEZ Wuillians OF 1.89/6'2" 90.0/198 R R 26 JUL 1983
21 LARA Hebert OF 1.80/5'11" 85.0/187 L L 29 JUN 1988
24 ACUÑA Ronald Jose OF 1.89/6'2" 95.0/209 R R 30 JUN 1979
25 ALEN Luis Jose C 1.79/5'10" 83.0/183 R R 16 APR 1985
26 CARREÑO Josmar P 1.81/5'11" 83.0/183 R R 13 AUG 1987
30 RIVAS Arturo OF 1.82/6'0" 102.0/225 R R 2 FEB 1984
31 ALFARO Gabriel P 1.86/6'1" 93.0/205 R R 26 JUN 1983
32 TORRES Luis P 1.80/5'11" 87.0/192 R R 6 JUN 1979
36 REYES Jesus P 1.80/5'11" 83.0/183 L L 26 FEB 1982
37 AZOCAR Luis P 1.83/6'0" 85.0/187 L L 9 JUN 1986
41 TORRES Saul IF 1.86/6'1" 90.0/198 R R 18 FEB 1982
45 CARABALLO Jhonny P 1.86/6'1" 86.0/190 R R 23 AUG 1985
47 YEPEZ Jesus Maria P 1.82/6'0" 90.0/198 L L 15 APR 1984
48 GUZMÁN Jorge P 1.81/5'11" 83.0/183 R R 14 AUG 1991
49 DELGADO George P 1.90/6'3" 89.0/196 L L 22 MAR 1984
55 FUENTES Juan C 1.83/6'0" 94.0/207 R R 28 JAN 1986
56 MORY Carlos Enrique P 1.80/5'11" 89.0/196 R R 15 MAY 1980
Manager: 8 SOJO Luis
Coaches: 6 ESCOBAR Oscar
19 MURO Ivan
28 CARRARA Giovanni
54 MARTINEZ Romulo
