= Lewis–Clark State College =

Public college in Lewiston, Idaho, US

Lewis-Clark State College
- Former names: Lewis-Clark Normal School (1955–1971); Northern Idaho College of Education (1947–1951); North Idaho Teachers College (1943–1947); Lewiston State Normal School (1893–1943)
- Type: Public college
- Established: 1893; 133 years ago
- Parent institution: Idaho State Board of Education
- Accreditation: NWCCU
- Academic affiliations: Space-grant
- President: Cynthia Pemberton
- Students: 4,046
- Location: Lewiston, Idaho, United States; 46.411°N 117.026°W
- Campus: 46 acres (0.19 km^{2}); Small city
- Other campuses: Coeur d'Alene
- Newspaper: The Pathfinder
- Colors: Navy, white, and red
- Nickname: Warriors
- Sporting affiliations: NAIA – CCC
- Website: lcsc.edu
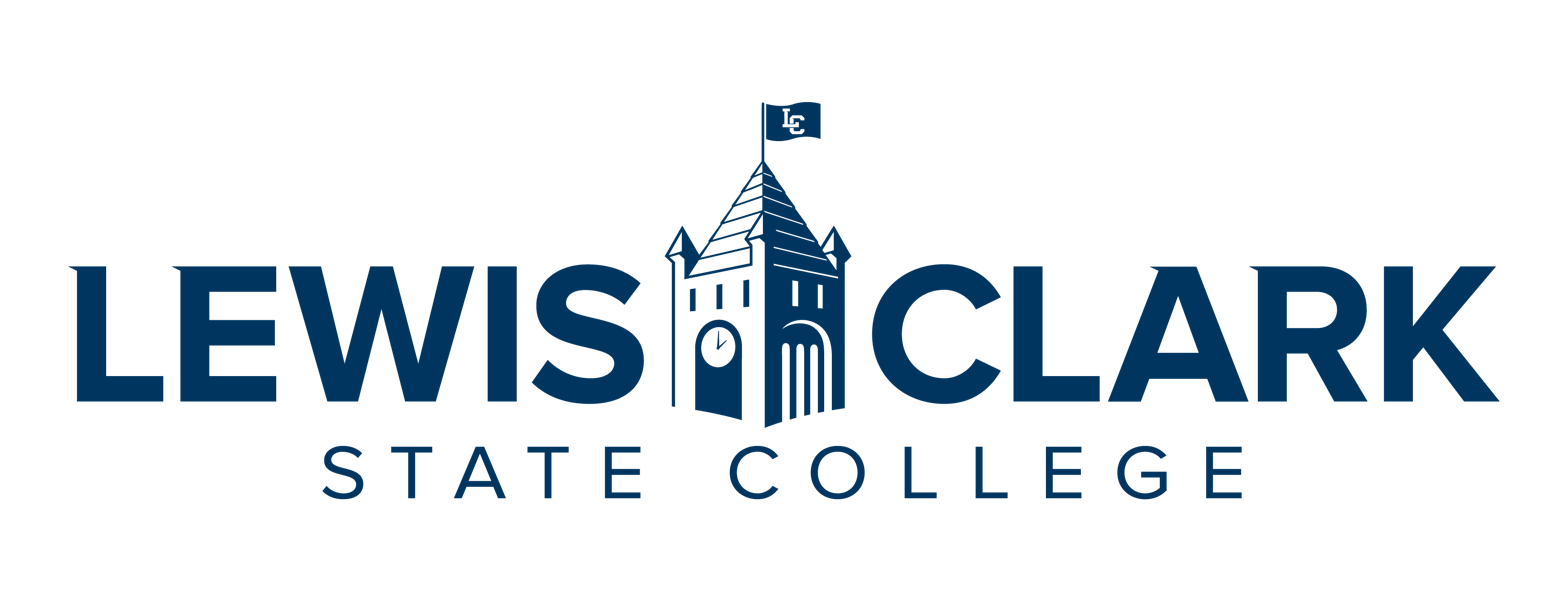

- Location in the United States Location in Idaho

Lewis–Clark State College is a public college in Lewiston, Idaho, United States. It was founded 133 years ago in 1893 and has an approximate annual enrollment of 3,600. The college offers more than 130 degrees.

== History ==
In 1893, Governor William J. McConnell signed an act on January 27 authorizing the establishment of the "Lewiston State Normal School" in Lewiston, "provided the mayor and common council of that city on or before May 1, 1893, donate ten acres, within the city limits and known as part of the city park, and authorizing the said mayor and council to convey to the trustees of said normal school the said tract of land," etc.

The first trustees on the school's board were former congressman James W. Reid, former governor N. B. Willey, Lewiston mayor J. Morris Howe, and C. W. Schaff, a local physician. Reid was elected president of the board, a position he held until his death in 1902.

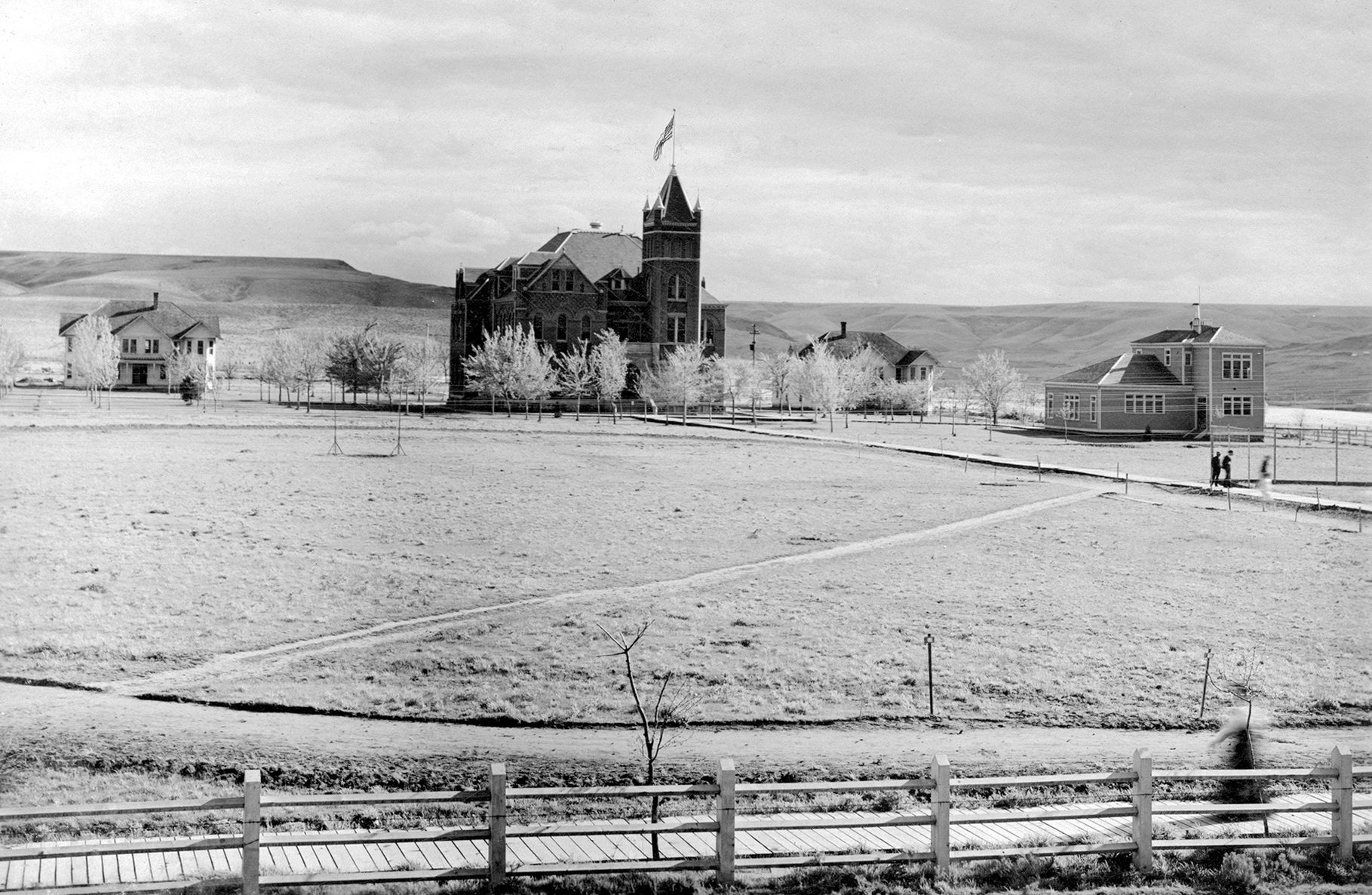
Lewis State Normal School c. 1904

Lewiston residents quickly obtained the required space for the school. However, the legislature acted slowly in providing construction funds, causing delays. George E. Knepper had been hired as first president of the school. Frustrated by the delays in developing his building, Knepper leased space in downtown Lewiston and opened for classes on January 6, 1896. The building itself was not ready until May. Over the next several years, more structures were added to the campus, including dormitories and a gymnasium.

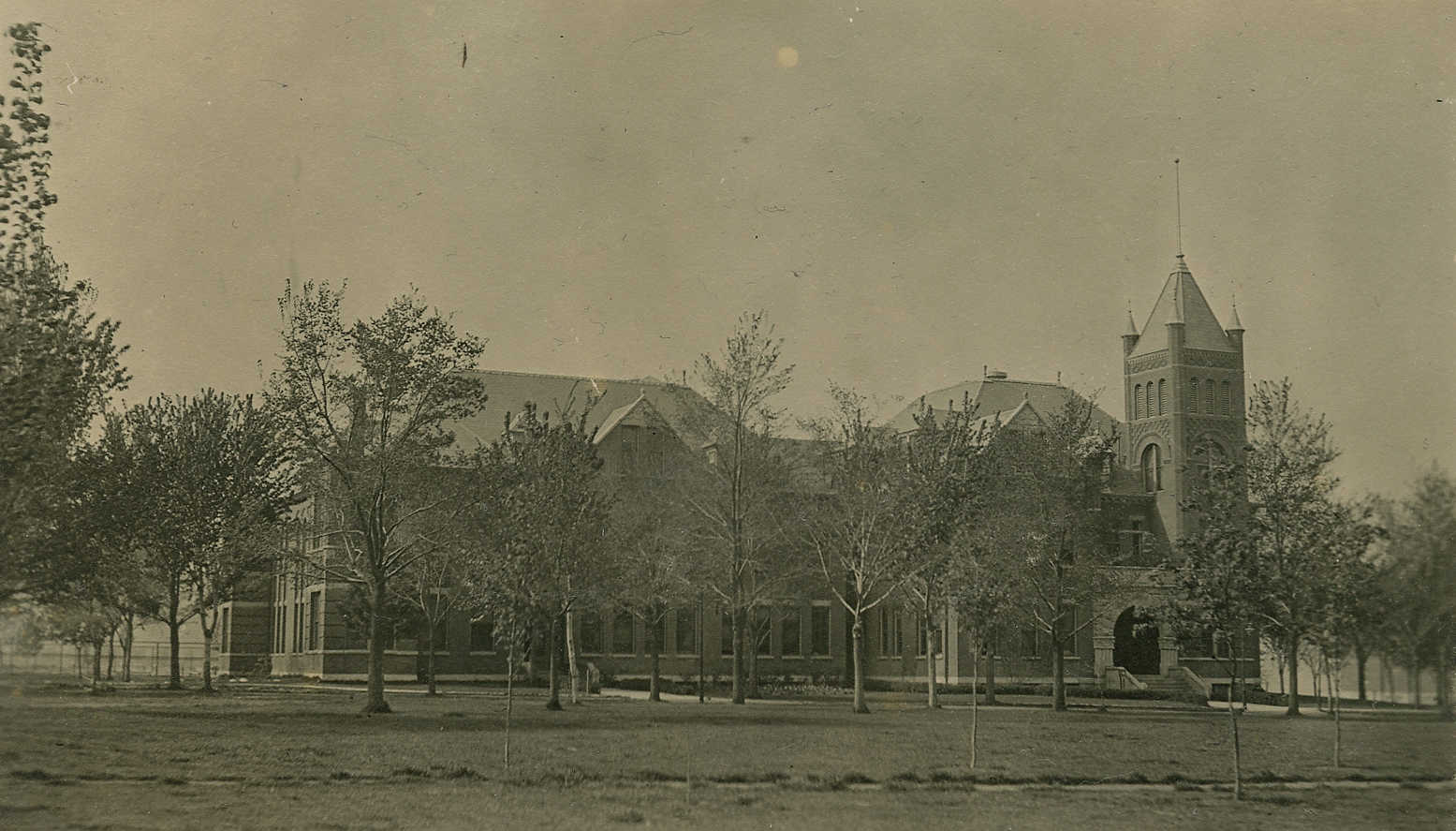
Administration building, ca. 1910

In keeping with the normal school philosophy, Lewiston Normal focused on practical, hands-on training for new teachers, including vocational education. The school also ran an on-campus training school.

Until the 1920s, one-room schools served well over half of Idaho's primary students.

World War II impacted the nation's normal schools, but not as much as it did conventional institutions. Generally, male students were in the majority at regular colleges, many of which experienced enrollment losses. Normal schools attracted a predominantly female student body, so the declines were much smaller, about 15% at Lewiston Normal.

The school experienced a crisis on December 5, 1917, when the Administration Building suffered severe damage in a fire, later determined to be arson by a student. Its cupola collapsed into the gutted interior of the main structure and the older east wing was totally destroyed.

Lewiston Normal continued to grow, as the demand for pre-college teachers increased. By the late 1920s, the "normal school" concept was being supplanted by a "teachers college" approach. Such colleges still focused on teacher education, but students could earn a bachelor's degree, more and more often required for certification. Recognizing this trend, school supporters began a campaign to change Lewiston Normal's status. They also began the process of upgrading the faculty. Supporters also fought an ongoing battle to keep the school open; some legislators wanted to close the normal schools to save money. During World War II, the school continued to train teachers while expanding its nurse-training program and producing a large numbers of fliers in its Navy Air School. In 1943, the Board of Education raised the school to full four-year status and became "North Idaho Teachers College" (NITC). Now with the ability to grant a Bachelor of Education degree, school leaders took it upon themselves to use the name "Northern Idaho College of Education" (NICE), and the legislature approved the name change in 1947.

The school got another temporary reprieve from cost-cutting when a deluge of veterans, funded by the G.I. Bill, enrolled after the war. In 1951, budget hawks succeeded in closing the school, as well as its counterpart, the "Southern Idaho College of Education" (SICE), which had previously been called Albion State Normal School, located in Albion, Idaho. The state's other colleges had assured legislators that they could supply all the teachers needed. In three years, the state found itself issuing nearly 40% more provisional teaching certificates than it had in 1951.

The legislature re-opened the school as "Lewis-Clark Normal School" in 1955 as a two-year school under the administration of the University of Idaho, thirty miles (50 km) north in Moscow. The first dean of the school was appointed in 1957, and enrollment was 319 in the fall of 1961. The arrangement with the university proved difficult and ended abruptly in 1963.

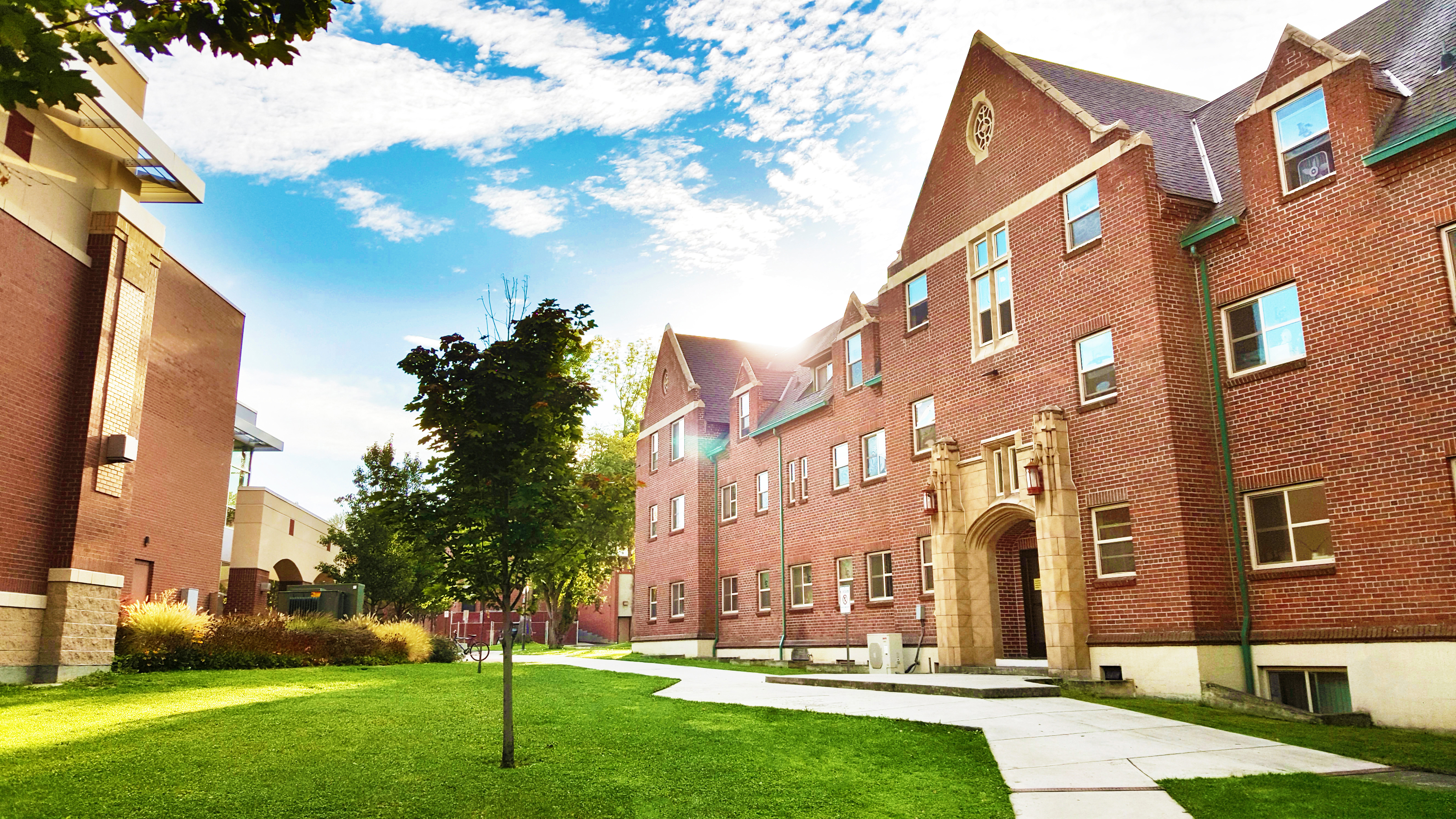
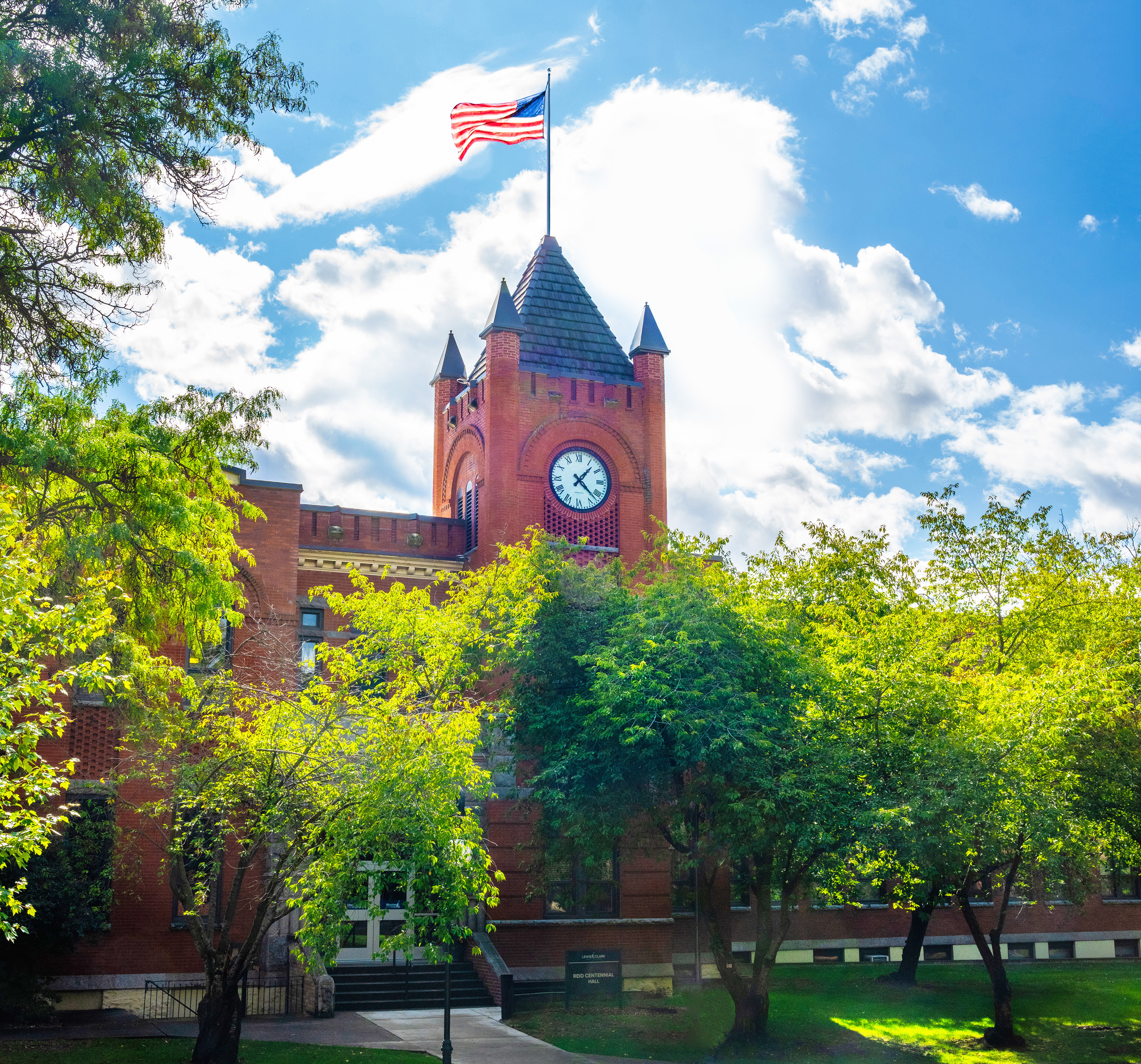
Talkington Hall (left) and Reid Centennial Hall Clock Tower at the LC State campus

The ongoing need for teachers, a developing shortage of nurses, and a new push for vocational education from the federal government combined to rescue the school from another closure. The state legislature voted to elevate it to four-year status in 1963 but did not approve funding until two years later. Enrollment of the now-independent, four-year school grew, from 465 in 1964 to 1,033 in the fall of 1968. It continued to grow and in July 1971 the name was officially changed to "Lewis-Clark State College", and was the last normal school in the country to make the change.

In April 2025, the Idaho State Board of Education approved a request to rebrand the school as Lewis-Clark State University to better reflect the institution’s offerings, which extend beyond two-year degrees. During the 2026 Legislative Session, Lewis-Clark President Cynthia Pemberton lobbied the legislature to pass Senate Bill 1234, which would codify the name change. Despite passing successfully through the Idaho Senate, the bill was opposed by House Speaker Mike Moyle and did not receive a hearing.

== Athletics ==
LC State athletics logo

The Lewis-Clark State athletic teams are called the Warriors and Lady Warriors. The college is a member of the National Association of Intercollegiate Athletics (NAIA), primarily competing in the Cascade Collegiate Conference (CCC) since autumn 2020. The Warriors and Lady Warriors previously competed in the Frontier Conference from 1998 to 2000.

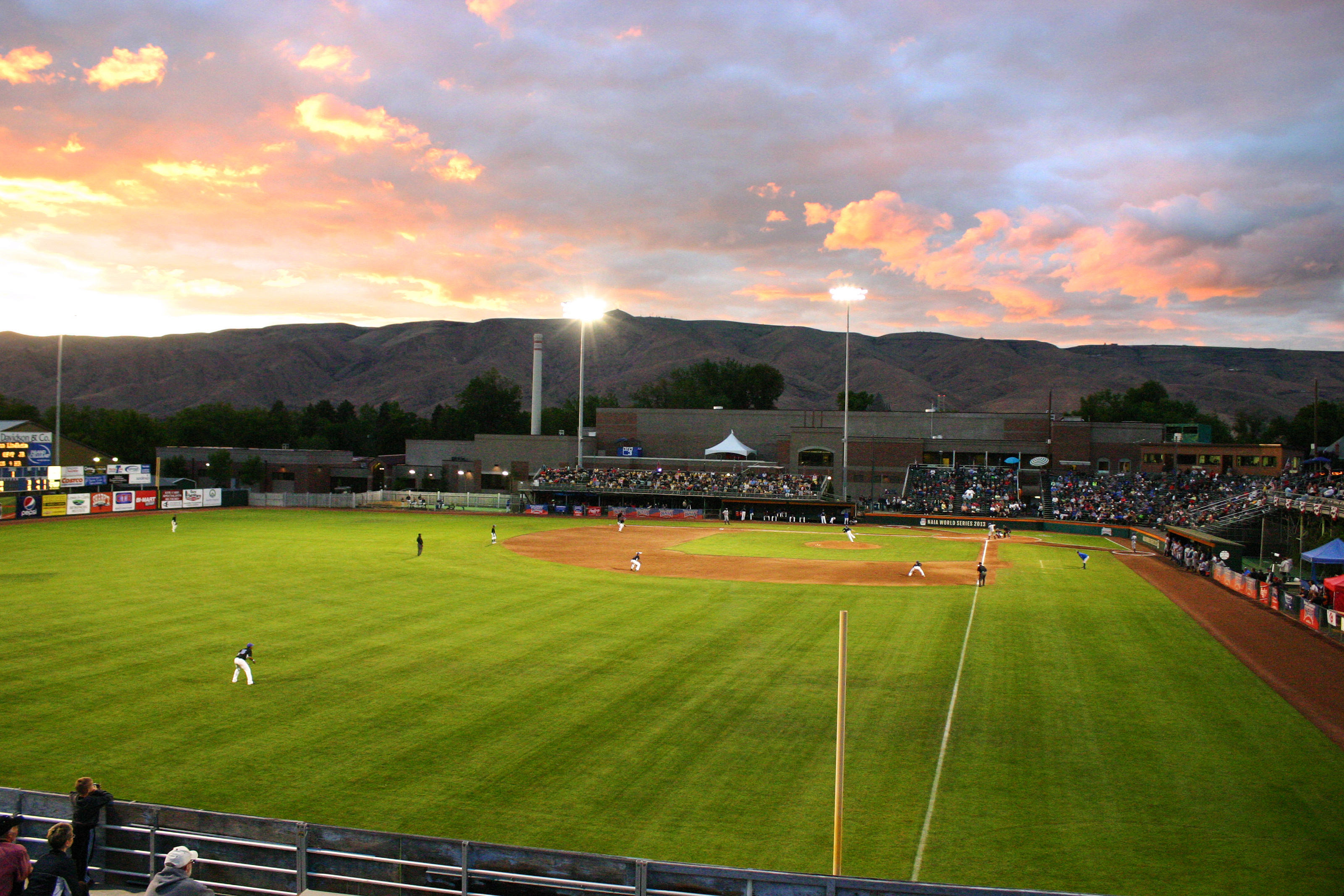
Historic Harris Field, LC State ballpark

LC State competes in twelve intercollegiate varsity sports: men's sports are baseball, basketball, cross country, golf, tennis, and track & field; women's sports include basketball, cross country, golf, tennis, track & field, and volleyball. The school colors are navy blue, white, and red. The nickname "Warriors" was adopted after the school reopened in 1955; earlier nicknames include "Pioneers" in the 1930s, "Loggers" was adopted through a contest in October 1938, and continued until the 1951 closure.

=== Baseball ===
Absent for a decade (1952–1961), baseball returned as an intercollegiate sport in 1962. Since 1984, the team has won nineteen NAIA national championships; sixteen were under head coach Ed Cheff, who retired after 34 years in 2010. LC State has hosted the NAIA World Series at Harris Field since 2000, and also from 1984 through 1991.

=== Basketball ===
In 2015-16, playing for the Grizzlies, in 2015–16, Jacob Wiley was named Frontier Conference Player of the Year, a First-Team NAIA All-American, and helped the program win its first-ever NAIA Tournament Championship game.

== Notable alumni ==
=== Baseball players ===
- Marvin Benard (born 1970)
- Connor Brogdon (born 1995)
- Seth Brown (born 1992)
- Vic Darensbourg (born 1970)
- Steve Decker (born 1965)
- Donnie Ecker (born 1986)
- Tom Edens (born 1961)
- Jason Ellison (born 1978)
- Anthony Ferrari (born 1978)
- Carlos Fisher (born 1983)
- John Foster (born 1978)
- Keith Foulke (born 1972)
- Emerson Frostad (born 1983)
- Sean Halton (born 1987)
- Blaine Hardy (born 1987)
- Bucky Jacobsen (born 1975)
- Chris Kissock (born 1985)
- Chris Mabeus (born 1979)
- Steve Reed (born 1965)
- Brendan Ryan (born 1982)
- Chris Schwinden (born 1986)
- Frank Williams (1958–2009)

=== Basketball players ===
- Alex Mallari (born 1987), former Philippine Basketball Association player
- Todd Phillips (born 1973), college basketball player and coach
- Jacob Wiley (born 1994), Israeli Basketball Premier League player

=== Other fields ===
- Sam Atkin (born 1993), track & field, Olympian, World Championship qualifier, professional runner (Puma Running)
- Kim Barnes (born 1958), author
- Ed Cheff (1943–2022), college baseball coach
- Bryan Fuller (born 1969), television writer and producer
- George Pfeifer (born 1955), basketball coach
- Aprilynne Pike (born 1980), New York Times best-selling author of young adult fiction
- Victor Rojas (born 1968), baseball executive and former Los Angeles Angels play-by-play announcer

== Student life ==
Undergraduate demographics as of Fall 2023
Race and ethnicity	Total
White	76%
Hispanic	9%
Two or more races	5%
Unknown	3%
American Indian/Alaska Native	2%
International student	2%
Asian	1%
Black	1%
Economic diversity
Low-income (Note: The percentage of students who received an income-based federal Pell grant intended for low-income students.)	38%
Affluent (Note: The percentage of students who are a part of the American middle class at the bare minimum.)	62%
