= Pan American Baseball Stadium =

Baseball stadium in Lagos de Moreno, Jalisco, Mexico

- Armando Reynoso Gutierrez Pan American Stadium
- Interactive map of Pan American Baseball Stadium
- Location: Carretera Federal 80; Lagos de Moreno, Jalisco, Mexico
- Coordinates: 21.3334°N 101.9865°W
- Capacity: 3,781
- Surface: Artificial Turf

Construction
- Opened: 2010

Tenant
- 2011 Pan American Games

Pan American Baseball Stadium (Spanish: Estadio Panamericano de Beisbol) is a 3,781 seat stadium in Lagos de Moreno, Mexico. It was built in 2010 to host the baseball competition at the 2011 Pan American Games.

Not to be confused with Estadio Panamericano de Béisbol, the stadium in Zapopan that was used for the athletics competitions and later converted for baseball use.
