= Baseball at the 2011 Pan American Games =

- Venue: Pan American Baseball Stadium
- Dates: October 19 – October 25
- Competitors: 190 from 8 nations

Medalists
Gold medal	Canada
Silver medal	United States
Bronze medal	Cuba

Baseball at the 2011 Pan American Games in Guadalajara was held between October 19 and 25, 2011. All games were played at the Pan American Baseball Stadium in Lagos de Moreno, Mexico. The draw for the competition took place in July 2011, in which the eight teams were drawn into two groups of four.

Baseball was competed by men only, while women competed in the similar sport of softball. Each team could enter a team of 24 athletes for a maximum of 192 competitors for this tournament. The tournament was played using designated hitter rules.

Cuba entered the tournament having won 10 consecutive baseball gold medals at the Pan American Games, dating back to 1971. Canada won the tournament, defeating the United States in the gold medal game. Cuba finished in third place, winning the bronze medal.

== Medal summary ==
=== Medal table ===
Rank	Nation	Gold	Silver	Bronze	Total
1	Canada	1	0	0	1
2	United States	0	1	0	1
3	Cuba	0	0	1	1
Totals (3 entries)		1	1	1	3

=== Medalists ===
Event	Gold	Silver	Bronze
Men's	Canada: Andrew Albers; Cole Armstrong; Chris Bisson; Shawn Bowman; Nick Bucci; Michael Crouse; Emerson Frostad; Mark Hardy; Jim Henderson; Shawn Hill; Jay Johnson; Mike Johnson; Chris Kissock; Brock Kjeldgaard; Marcus Knecht; Kyle Lotzkar; Jonathan Malo; Dustin Molleken; Scott Richmond; Chris Robinson; Jamie Romak; Tim Smith; Skyler Stromsmoe; Jimmy Van Ostrand	United States: Pete Andrelczyk; Jeff Beliveau; Brett Carroll; Justin Cassel; Matt Clark; Jordan Danks; C. J. Fick; James Gallagher; Drew Garcia; Tuffy Gosewisch; Brett Jackson; Jeff Marquez; James McCann; Tommy Mendonca; Jordy Mercer; Scott Patterson; A. J. Pollock; Todd Redmond; Matt Shoemaker; Drew Smyly; Joe Thurston; Chad Tracy; Andy Van Hekken; Randy Williams	Cuba: José Abreu; Yosvany Alarcón; Freddy Álvarez; Erisbel Arruebarrena; Alexeis Bell; Rusney Castillo; Frederich Cepeda; Alfredo Despaigne; Giorvis Duvergel; Michel Enríquez; Miguel González; Norberto González; Yulieski González; Yuli Gurriel; Dalier Hinojosa; Miguel Lahera; Jonder Martínez; Frank Morejón; Vicyohandri Odelín; Héctor Olivera; Yadier Pedroso; Ariel Pestano; Rudy Reyes; Alberto Soto

== Schedule ==
The competition was spread out across seven days.

Preliminary round	Semifinals	M	Event finals

October	19th Wed	20th Thu	21st Fri	22nd Sat	23rd Sun	24th Mon	25th Tue	Gold medals
Men's tournament							M	1

== Teams ==
=== Qualifying Summary ===
The hosts Mexico, along with the top seven teams at the Pan American Qualification tournament qualified to compete at the games.

Event	Date	Location	Vacancies	Qualified
Host Nation	–	–	1	Mexico
Qualifying Tournament	Oct 1 – Oct 13, 2010	(Puerto Rico) Mayagüez, Carolina and Ponce	7	United States; Cuba; Venezuela; Dominican Republic; Panama; Canada; Puerto Rico
TOTAL			8	

=== Participants ===
- Canada
- Cuba
- Dominican Republic
- Mexico
- Panama
- Puerto Rico
- United States
- Venezuela

== Format ==
- Eight teams are split into 2 preliminary round groups of 4 teams each. The top 2 teams from each group qualify for the knockout stage.
- The third and fourth placed teams in each group will play each other for fifth and seventh place respectively.
- In the semifinals, the matchups are as follows: A1 vs. B2 and B1 vs. A2
- The winning teams from the semifinals play for the gold medal. The losing teams compete for the bronze medal.

Ties are broken via the following the criteria, with the first option used first, all the way down to the last option:

1. Head to head results.
2. Run average (not the run difference) between the tied teams.

== Preliminary round ==
All times are local Central Daylight Time (UTC−5)

=== Group A ===
Pos	Team	W	L	RF	RA	RD	PCT	GB	Qualification
1	Mexico (H)	3	0	8	5	+3	1.000	—	Advance to Semifinals
2	United States	2	1	33	5	+28	.667	1	Advance to Semifinals
3	Dominican Republic	1	2	12	29	−17	.333	2	
4	Panama	0	3	7	21	−14	.000	3	

(H) Hosts

October 19, 2011; 19:00	Mexico	2–1	Panama	Pan American Baseball Stadium, Lagos de Moreno
October 19, 2011; 19:00		http://200.57.183.69/ENG/BB/BBR173A_BBM40040010100001ENG.htm		Pan American Baseball Stadium, Lagos de Moreno

October 20, 2011; 14:00	Dominican Republic	2–20	United States	Pan American Baseball Stadium, Lagos de Moreno
October 20, 2011; 14:00		http://200.57.183.69/ENG/BB/BBR173A_BBM40040010100002ENG.htm		Pan American Baseball Stadium, Lagos de Moreno

October 21, 2011; 10:00	United States	11–0	Panama	Pan American Baseball Stadium, Lagos de Moreno
October 21, 2011; 10:00		Boxscore		Pan American Baseball Stadium, Lagos de Moreno

October 21, 2011; 19:00	Mexico	3–2	Dominican Republic	Pan American Baseball Stadium, Lagos de Moreno
October 21, 2011; 19:00		Boxscore		Pan American Baseball Stadium, Lagos de Moreno

October 22, 2011; 14:00	Panama	6–8	Dominican Republic	Pan American Baseball Stadium, Lagos de Moreno
October 22, 2011; 14:00		http://200.57.183.69/ENG/BB/BBR173A_BBM40040010100005ENG.htm		Pan American Baseball Stadium, Lagos de Moreno

October 22, 2011; 19:00	Mexico	3–2	United States	Pan American Baseball Stadium, Lagos de Moreno
October 22, 2011; 19:00		http://200.57.183.69/ENG/BB/BBR173A_BBM40040010100006ENG.htm		Pan American Baseball Stadium, Lagos de Moreno

=== Group B ===
Pos	Team	W	L	RF	RA	RD	PCT	GB	Qualification
1	Cuba	3	0	22	16	+6	1.000	—	Advance to Semifinals
2	Canada	2	1	14	14	0	.667	1	Advance to Semifinals
3	Venezuela	1	2	14	15	−1	.333	2	
4	Puerto Rico	0	3	17	22	−5	.000	3	

October 19, 2011; 10:00	Canada	5–4	Puerto Rico	Pan American Baseball Stadium, Lagos de Moreno
October 19, 2011; 10:00		http://200.57.183.69/ENG/BB/BBR173A_BBM40040010200001ENG.htm		Pan American Baseball Stadium, Lagos de Moreno

October 19, 2011; 14:00	Venezuela	4–5	Cuba	Pan American Baseball Stadium, Lagos de Moreno
October 19, 2011; 14:00		http://200.57.183.69/ENG/BB/BBR173A_BBM40040010200002ENG.htm		Pan American Baseball Stadium, Lagos de Moreno

October 20, 2011; 10:00	Venezuela	9–6	Puerto Rico	Pan American Baseball Stadium, Lagos de Moreno
October 20, 2011; 10:00		http://200.57.183.69/ENG/BB/BBR173A_BBM40040010200003ENG.htm		Pan American Baseball Stadium, Lagos de Moreno

October 20, 2011; 19:00	Canada	5–9	Cuba	Pan American Baseball Stadium, Lagos de Moreno
October 20, 2011; 19:00		http://200.57.183.69/ENG/BB/BBR173A_BBM40040010200004ENG.htm		Pan American Baseball Stadium, Lagos de Moreno

October 21, 2011; 14:00	Puerto Rico	7–8	Cuba	Pan American Baseball Stadium, Lagos de Moreno
October 21, 2011; 14:00		Boxscore		Pan American Baseball Stadium, Lagos de Moreno

October 22, 2011; 10:00	Venezuela	1–4	Canada	Pan American Baseball Stadium, Lagos de Moreno
October 22, 2011; 10:00		http://200.57.183.69/ENG/BB/BBR173A_BBM40040010200006ENG.htm		Pan American Baseball Stadium, Lagos de Moreno

== Elimination stage ==
=== Seventh place match ===
October 24, 2011; 10:00	Puerto Rico	3–2	Panama	Pan American Baseball Stadium, Lagos de Moreno
October 24, 2011; 10:00		Boxscore		Pan American Baseball Stadium, Lagos de Moreno

=== Fifth place match ===
October 25, 2011; 10:00	Venezuela	7–14	Dominican Republic	Pan American Baseball Stadium, Lagos de Moreno
October 25, 2011; 10:00		Boxscore		Pan American Baseball Stadium, Lagos de Moreno

Semi-finals
24 October – Lagos de Moreno
Cuba	10
United States	12
24 October – Lagos de Moreno
Mexico	3
Canada	5

Final
25 October – Lagos de Moreno
United States	1
Canada	2
Third place
25 October – Lagos de Moreno
Cuba	6
Mexico	0

=== Semifinals ===
October 24, 2011; 14:00	United States	12–10	Cuba	Pan American Baseball Stadium, Lagos de Moreno
October 24, 2011; 14:00		Boxscore		Pan American Baseball Stadium, Lagos de Moreno

October 24, 2011; 19:00	Canada	5–3	Mexico	Pan American Baseball Stadium, Lagos de Moreno
October 24, 2011; 19:00		Boxscore		Pan American Baseball Stadium, Lagos de Moreno

=== Bronze medal match ===
October 25, 2011; 14:00	Cuba	6–0	Mexico	Pan American Baseball Stadium, Lagos de Moreno
October 25, 2011; 14:00		http://200.57.183.69/ENG/BB/BBR173A_BBM40040040200002ENG.htm		Pan American Baseball Stadium, Lagos de Moreno

=== Gold medal match ===
October 25, 2011; 19:00	United States	1–2	Canada	Pan American Baseball Stadium, Lagos de Moreno
October 25, 2011; 19:00		http://200.57.183.69/ENG/BB/BBR173A_BBM40040040100001ENG.htm		Pan American Baseball Stadium, Lagos de Moreno

2011 Pan American Games Baseball tournament
Winners

Canada
1st title

== Final standings ==
Rank	Team	Record
Gold medal	Canada	4–1
Silver medal	United States	3–2
Bronze medal	Cuba	4–1
4	Mexico	3–2
5	Dominican Republic	2–2
6	Venezuela	1–3
7	Puerto Rico	1–3
8	Panama	0–4

== Statistics leaders ==
=== Batting ===
Statistic	Name	Total/Avg
Batting average	(United States) Brett Carroll	.556
Hits	(United States) Brett Carroll	10
Runs	(United States) Brett Carroll	8
Home runs	(Cuba) José Dariel Abreu	3
RBI	(United States) Tommy Mendonca	10
Stolen bases	(Puerto Rico) Reymond Fuentes	3
Slugging percentage	(United States) Brett Carroll	1.111

=== Pitching ===
Statistic	Name	Total/Avg
Wins	(Canada) Shawn Hill	2
Losses	(Panama) Eliecer Navarro (Venezuela) Luis Torres	2
Saves	(Mexico) Alan Guerrero	2
Innings pitched	(United States) Andy Van Hekken	14
ERA	35 players	0.00
Strikeouts	(Puerto Rico) Julio Rodriguez (Cuba) Miguel González	11
