= Brett Carroll =

American baseball player (born 1982)

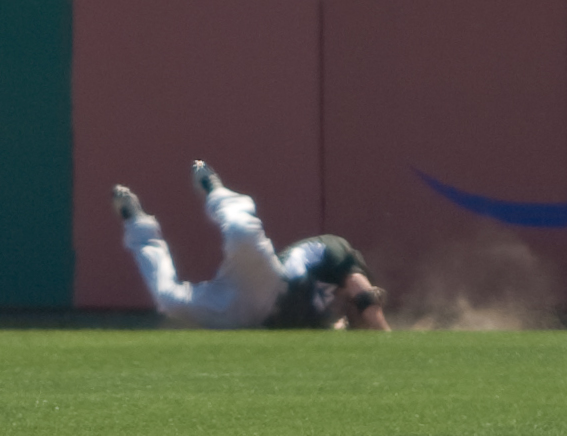
- Carroll making a diving catch with the Florida Marlins in 2010
- Outfielder
- Born: October 3, 1982 (age 43); Knoxville, Tennessee, U.S.
- Batted: Right Threw: Right

MLB debut
- June 17, 2007, for the Florida Marlins

Last MLB appearance
- April 13, 2012, for the Washington Nationals

MLB statistics
- Batting average: .201
- Home runs: 5
- Runs batted in: 28
- Stats at Baseball Reference

Teams
- Florida Marlins (2007–2010); Milwaukee Brewers (2011); Washington Nationals (2012)
Medals
Men's baseball
Representing United States
Pan American Games
Silver medal – second place	2011 Guadalajara	National team

Brett Michael Carroll (born October 3, 1982) is an American former professional baseball outfielder. He played in Major League Baseball (MLB) from 2007 to 2012 for the Florida Marlins, Milwaukee Brewers, and Washington Nationals. After attending Middle Tennessee State University, he was selected in the 10th round of the 2004 MLB draft and signed on. Carroll also competed for Team USA in the World Cup and Pan American Games, receiving a silver medal in 2011.

Carroll is the only player in MLB history to hit his first MLB home run and a triple off HOF pitcher Randy Johnson in the same game.

== Career ==
=== Florida Marlins ===
On June 8, 2009, Carroll hit his first career home run against Randy Johnson. According to the Elias Sport Bureau, the only other currently active major league player whose first major league home run was hit off a pitcher with at least 300 wins is reliever Jon Rauch, whose only career home run came against Roger Clemens in 2004. Carroll also became the first player ever to hit both a home run and a triple against Johnson in the same game.

He drove in the game winning run with his first career walk-off hit on September 23 versus the Philadelphia Phillies.

=== Milwaukee Brewers ===
On November 16, 2010, Carroll signed with the Kansas City Royals organization. He was traded to the Milwaukee Brewers organization on March 22, 2011, in exchange for cash considerations. On July 21, Carroll had his contract purchased by the Brewers. On July 30, he was designated for assignment. Carroll cleared waivers and was sent outright to the Triple-A Nashville Sounds, but opted for free agency on August 3.

=== Boston Red Sox ===
On August 5, 2011, Carroll signed a minor league contract with the Boston Red Sox organization.

=== Washington Nationals ===
Carroll signed a minor league contract with the Washington Nationals in December 2011. He broke camp with the team on its Opening Day roster and went 0-for-2 in five games before he was designated for assignment on April 13, 2012, to make room for Rick Ankiel's return from the disabled list. He spent the remainder of the season with the Triple-A Syracuse Chiefs before electing free agency on October 16

=== Pittsburgh Pirates ===
Carroll spent the 2013 season with the Pittsburgh Pirates' Triple-A affiliate Indianapolis Indians.

=== Toronto Blue Jays ===
On February 10, 2014, Carroll signed with the Lancaster Barnstormers of the Atlantic League of Professional Baseball. However, on February 18, Carroll signed a minor league contract with the Toronto Blue Jays. He was subsequently assigned to the Triple-A Buffalo Bisons.
