= James McCann (baseball) =

American baseball player (born 1990)

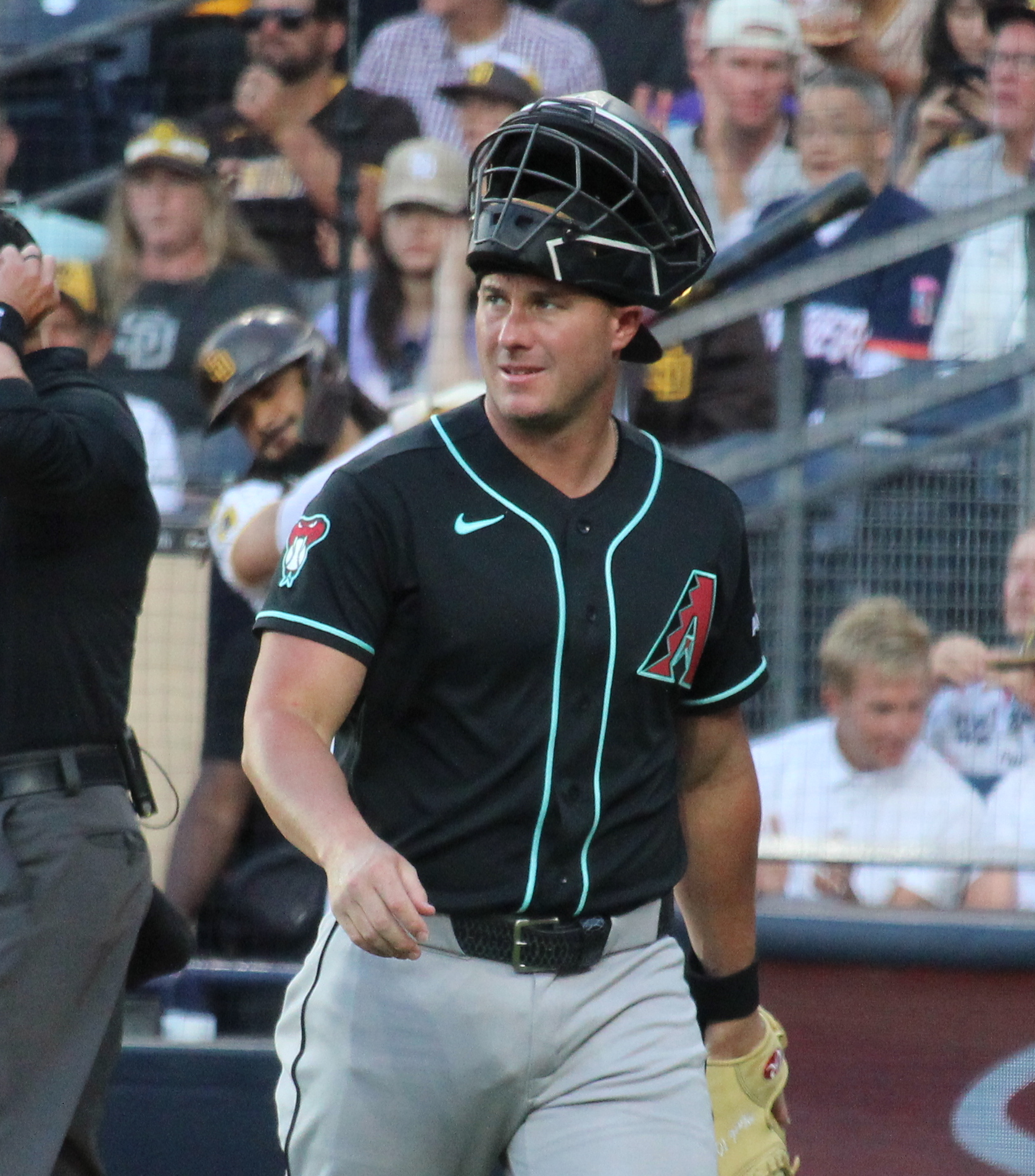
- McCann with the Diamondbacks in 2026

Free agent
- Catcher
- Born: June 13, 1990 (age 36); Santa Barbara, California, U.S.
- Bats: Right Throws: Right

MLB debut
- September 1, 2014, for the Detroit Tigers

MLB statistics (through 2026 season)
- Batting average: .244
- Home runs: 104
- Runs batted in: 418
- Stats at Baseball Reference

Teams
- Detroit Tigers (2014–2018); Chicago White Sox (2019–2020); New York Mets (2021–2022); Baltimore Orioles (2023–2024); Arizona Diamondbacks (2025–2026)

Career highlights and awards
- All-Star (2019)
Medals
Men's baseball
Representing United States
Pan American Games
Silver medal – second place	2011 Guadalajara	Team

James Thomas McCann (born June 13, 1990), nicknamed "McCannon", is an American professional baseball catcher who is a free agent. He has played in Major League Baseball (MLB) for the Detroit Tigers, Chicago White Sox, New York Mets, Baltimore Orioles, and Arizona Diamondbacks.

Prior to his professional career, McCann played college baseball at the University of Arkansas. He has also competed for the United States national baseball team. In 2019, as a member of the White Sox, he was named to the MLB All-Star Game. McCann has caught two no-hitters in the major leagues: one pitched by Lucas Giolito in 2020 with the White Sox, and one pitched by Tylor Megill, Drew Smith, Joely Rodríguez, Seth Lugo, and Edwin Díaz in 2022 with the Mets.

== Early life ==
McCann was born on June 13, 1990, in Santa Barbara, California. His mother Carla suffered a torn amniotic sac while she was pregnant with McCann, and she spent the bulk of the pregnancy on bed rest. Her doctors recommended an abortion since McCann had less than a 25% chance of surviving and, even if he did survive, there was a substantial likelihood of permanent disability. McCann attributes growing up healthy to become a major league baseball player to God.

During that time, she watched local sports, particularly the Los Angeles Lakers of the National Basketball Association (NBA) and the Los Angeles Dodgers of Major League Baseball (MLB). After McCann was born, his mother served as his tee ball coach and drove him to and from Little League Baseball games and tournaments. As a child, McCann was teammates with future MLB All-Star Jeff McNeil.

== Amateur career ==
McCann attended Dos Pueblos High School in Goleta, California. He played baseball in the Channel League and was named to the all-league first team in 2006 2007, and 2008. Out of high school, the White Sox drafted McCann in the 31st round of the 2008 MLB draft, but he did not sign, opting to attend college at Arkansas.

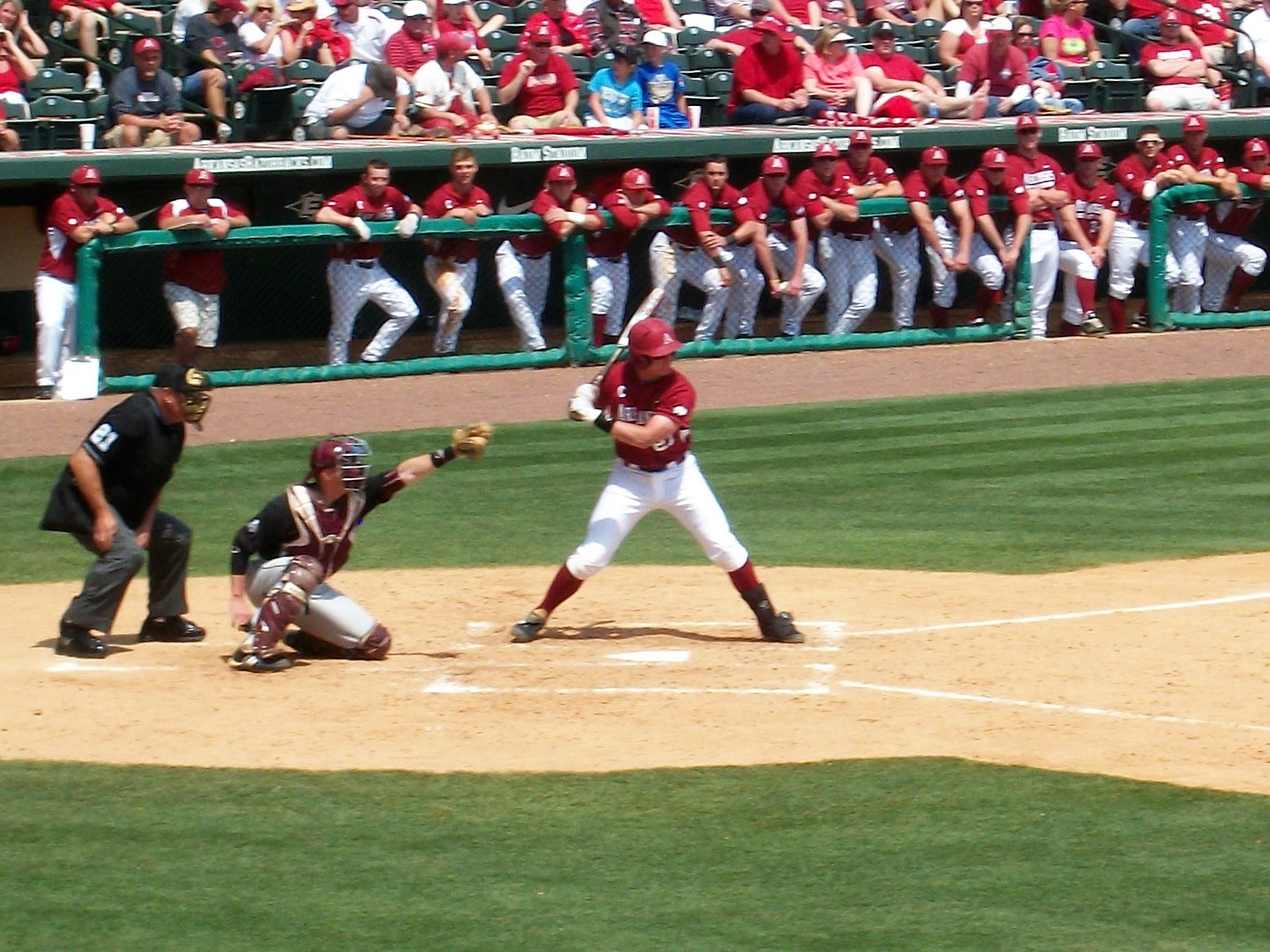
McCann bats for the Arkansas Razorbacks

At Arkansas, McCann played college baseball for the Arkansas Razorbacks baseball team in the Southeastern Conference of the National Collegiate Athletic Association's (NCAA) Division I. As a freshman in 2009, he teamed with future big leaguers Dallas Keuchel, Drew Smyly, Mike Bolsinger, Brett Eibner and Andy Wilkins to help the Razorbacks reach the 2009 College World Series. As a team captain in his sophomore season, McCann hit a walk-off home run to beat the #14 LSU Tigers, 4–3, in front of a Baum Stadium record crowd of 11,103. The home run was voted as the third-most memorable moment in Baum Stadium history by Razorbacks fans in 2014.

In 2010, he played collegiate summer baseball with the Cotuit Kettleers of the Cape Cod Baseball League.

In his junior season, McCann had a .306 batting average, six home runs, 14 doubles, 11 stolen bases, 38 runs batted in (RBIs) and 35 runs scored in 61 games played and was named a semifinalist for the Johnny Bench Award, presented to the best catcher in NCAA's Division I.

After the 2011 college baseball season, McCann played for the United States national baseball team in the 2011 Baseball World Cup and the 2011 Pan American Games, winning the silver medal in the latter.

== Professional career ==
=== Minor leagues (2011–2014) ===
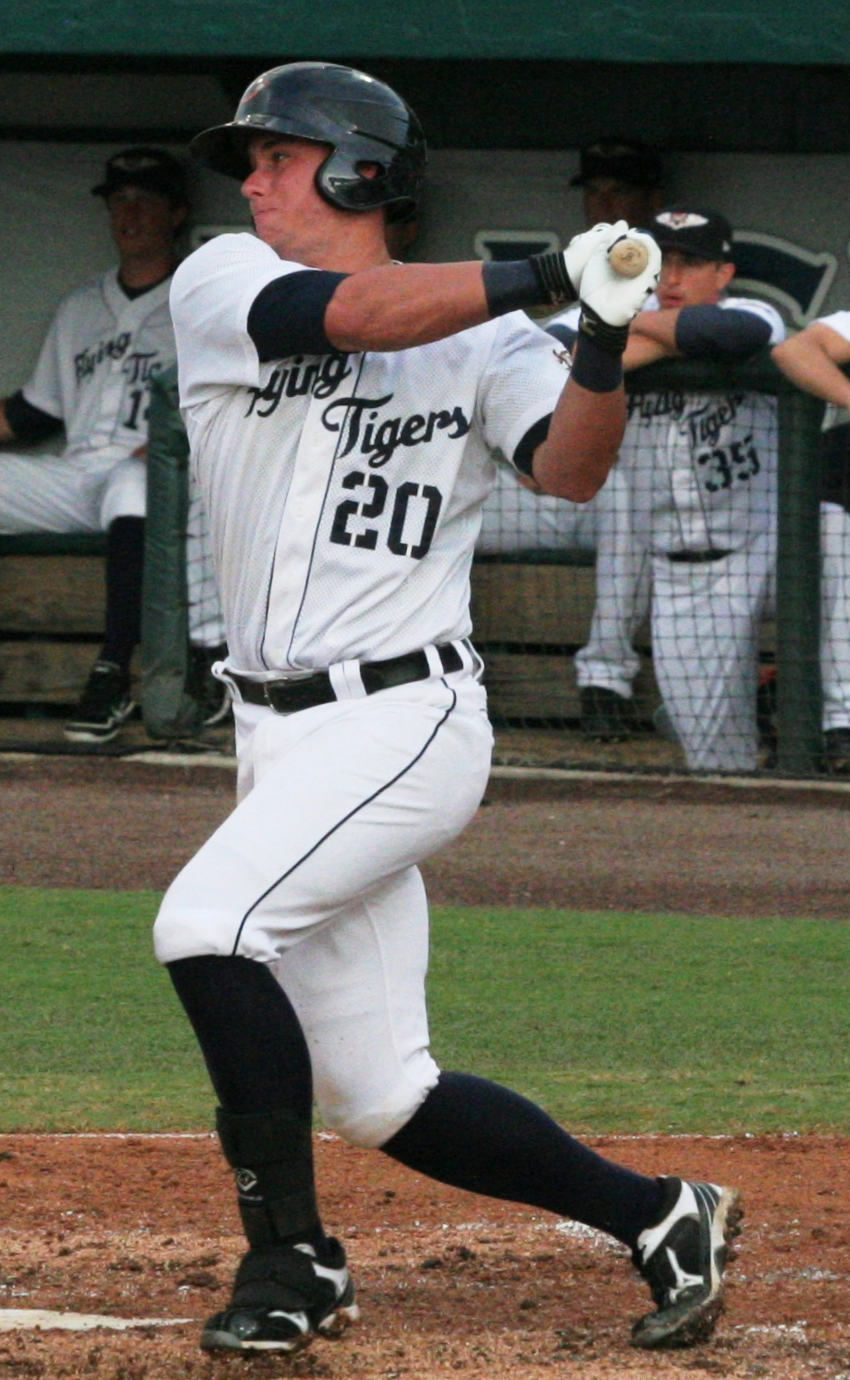
McCann batting for the Lakeland Flying Tigers in 2012

The Tigers selected McCann in the second round, with the 76th overall selection, of the 2011 MLB draft. He was Detroit's first selection of the draft, and the first of four catchers the team selected. He signed with the Tigers and made his professional debut in 2011, playing five games with the Gulf Coast League Tigers of the Rookie-level Gulf Coast League before being promoted to the West Michigan Whitecaps of the Single-A Midwest League.

The Tigers invited McCann to spring training in 2012. He began the 2012 season with the Lakeland Flying Tigers of the High-A Florida State League, and received a promotion to the Erie SeaWolves of the Double-A Eastern League on June 6, though be batted only .200 for Erie. After adjusting his offensive approach, McCann responded with a .283 average through July 14 of the 2013 season, and appeared in the All-Star Futures Game. He ended the season with a .277 average, eight home runs, 30 doubles, 54 RBI, and an on-base plus slugging (OPS) of .731.

McCann began the 2014 season with the Toledo Mud Hens of the Triple-A International League. McCann finished the season with the Mud Hens batting .295 with seven home runs, 54 RBI, and a .770 OPS.

=== Detroit Tigers (2014–2018) ===
==== 2014–2015 ====
On September 1, 2014, McCann was called up by the Detroit Tigers. He made his MLB debut that day in the bottom of the ninth inning, replacing catcher Alex Avila. McCann got his first MLB start on September 19, 2014, catching for Justin Verlander against the Kansas City Royals. McCann had two hits (both to center field), a stolen base, and scored twice.

In spring training in 2015, McCann won the job as the team's backup catcher to Avila. He hit his first major league home run, an inside-the-park home run, on April 29, 2015. On May 21, 2015, he hit his first conventional home run, a walk-off in the 11th inning to give the Tigers a 6–5 victory over the Houston Astros. McCann became the first MLB player to hit an inside-the-park home run and a walk-off home run for his first two career home runs since Tim Raines in 1981. On June 28, 2015, McCann hit a walk-off home run in the bottom of the 9th inning to give the Tigers a 5–4 victory over the Chicago White Sox. McCann became the first MLB player to hit an inside-the-park home run and two walk-off home runs for his first three career home runs since Tony Piet in 1932.

McCann set the modern major league record for the number of consecutive games played at catcher to start a career without an error, surpassing the previous record of 93 set by Frankie Pytlak from 1932 to 1934. McCann finished the 2015 season with no errors in 112 games played at catcher to lead all MLB catchers in fielding percentage. He became the sixth catcher in major league history to catch at least 100 games in a season without committing an error, following Chris Iannetta and Chris Snyder in 2008, Mike Matheny in 2003, Charles Johnson in 1997 and Buddy Rosar in 1946. He also threw out 41 percent of would-be base stealers (versus a league average of 32 percent), helping him earn the nickname "McCannon" among Detroit fans.

McCann was named the 2015 Detroit Tigers/Detroit Sports Broadcasters Association Rookie of the Year. He finished the 2015 season with a .264 average (106-for-401), 18 doubles, five triples, seven home runs and 41 RBIs, while throwing out 41 percent of potential base stealers. His 29 multi-hit games ranked fourth among American League rookies.

==== 2016–2018 ====
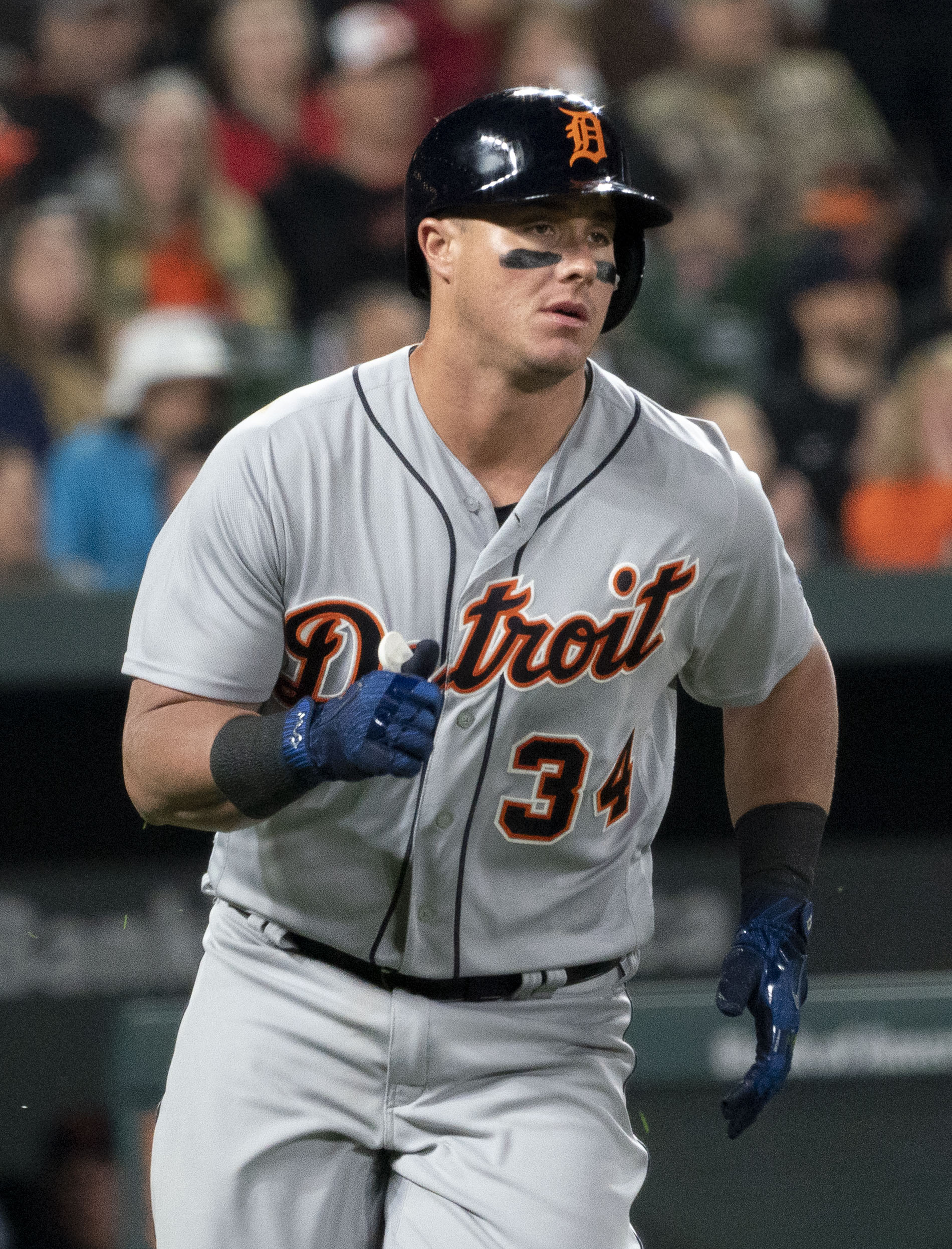
McCann with the Tigers in 2018

On April 11, 2016, McCann suffered a Grade 2 right ankle sprain and was placed on the disabled list. On May 31, 2016, McCann's Major League record of 139 games to start a career at catcher without committing an error ended.

For the 2016 season, McCann batted .221 with 12 home runs and 48 RBIs in 105 games. Following the season, McCann was named a Gold Glove Award finalist for catcher, along with Carlos Pérez and Salvador Pérez. McCann threw out 45 percent of would-be base stealers, second-highest among AL catchers, and led his position with nine double plays. His nine Defensive Runs Saved rating also ranked second in the AL.

On May 26, 2017, McCann was put on the 10 day DL because of a left hand laceration. He returned to the Tigers on June 9 against the Boston Red Sox. McCann struggled at the plate through June, finishing the month with a .194 batting average and .268 on-base percentage. However, a hot July including a ten-game hitting streak to finish off the month and four multi-hit games pushed McCann's average to the .246 mark with a .321 on-base percentage. For all of July, McCann batted .396 (19-for-48) with a .473 OBP, seven extra-base hits and 11 runs batted in. His hitting streak would extend to 14 games before ending on August 5. McCann finished the 2017 season with a .253 batting average, while hitting 13 home runs in 352 at-bats.

On January 11, 2018, the Tigers signed McCann to a one-year deal worth $2.375 million, avoiding arbitration. McCann played in a career-high 118 games during the 2018 season, posting a .220 batting average with 8 home runs and 39 RBIs. He threw out 36% of potential base stealers, versus a league average of 28%. On November 30, 2018, the Tigers non-tendered McCann and he became a free agent.

=== Chicago White Sox (2019–2020) ===
On December 19, 2018, McCann signed a one-year, $2.5 million contract with the Chicago White Sox. McCann had his best start to a major league season in 2019, batting .319 (67-for-210) with 9 home runs by the end of June. He was invited to his first All-Star Game, where he hit a single in his only plate appearance. He finished the year hitting .273 with 18 home runs and 60 RBIs, all career highs.

The White Sox retained McCann for the 2020 season, tendering a $5.4 million one-year contract. On August 25, 2020, McCann was the catcher when Lucas Giolito threw the 19th no-hitter in White Sox history. Overall with the White Sox, McCann batted .289 with seven home runs and 15 RBIs in 31 games.

=== New York Mets (2021–2022) ===
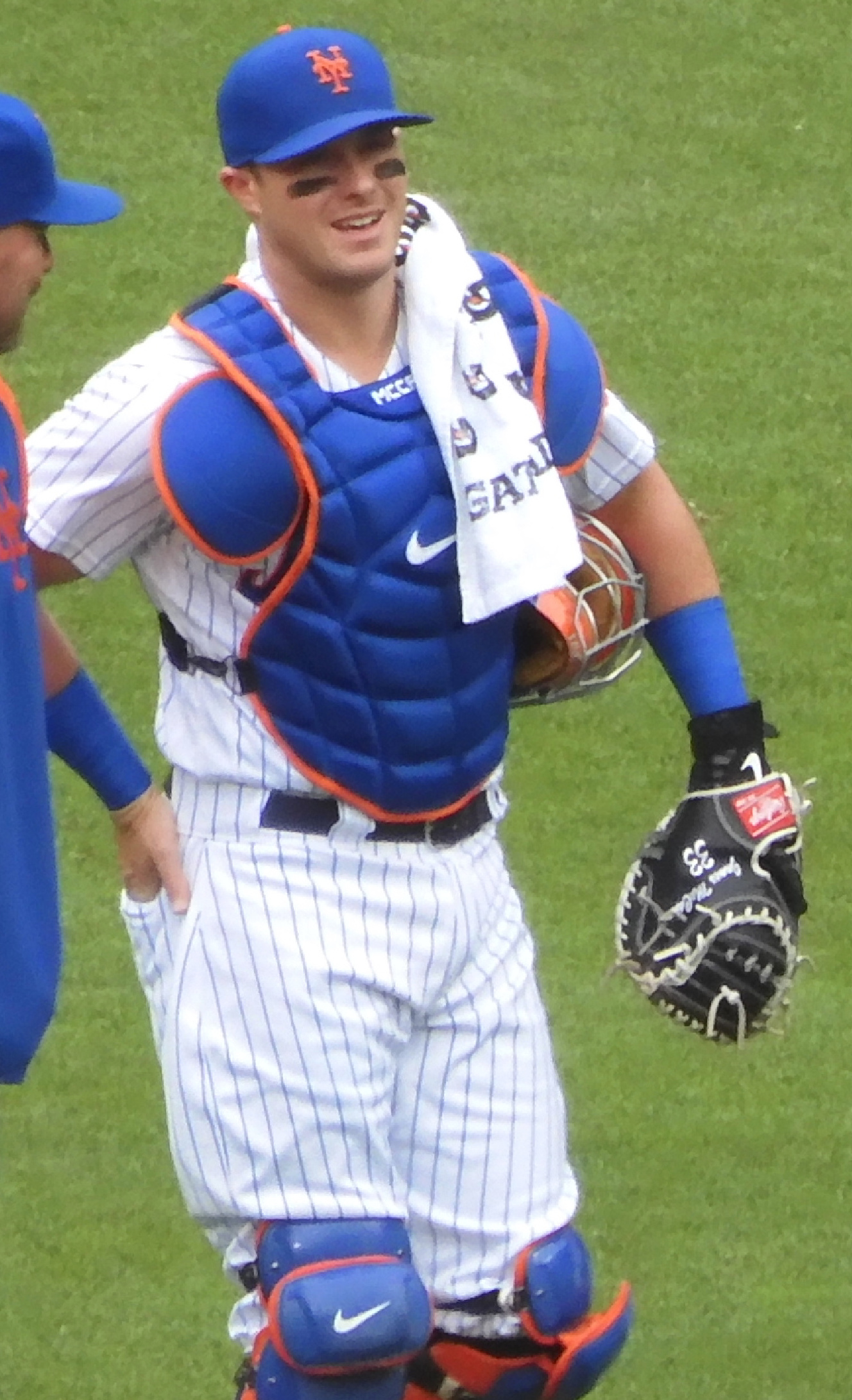
McCann in 2022

On December 15, 2020, McCann signed a four-year, $40.6 million contract with the New York Mets. He appeared in 112 games for the Mets during the 2021 season, batting .232 with 10 home runs and 46 RBIs. In May 2022, McCann had surgery to repair a broken hamate bone in his left wrist, missing six weeks, and returned to the injured list in July with a strained oblique muscle. He batted .195 in 61 games in the 2022 season.

=== Baltimore Orioles (2023–2024) ===
The Mets traded McCann with cash considerations to the Baltimore Orioles on December 21, 2022. On January 13, 2023, minor league outfielder Luis De La Cruz was sent to the Mets to complete the trade. In March 2023, McCann was placed on the injured list with a left oblique strain, missing a week, and returned to the injured list in June with a sprained left ankle. He has had a pair of three-hit games with the Orioles, beginning with an 11–7 win over the Kansas City Royals at Kauffman Stadium on May 2. The other was a 10–3 victory over the Mets at Camden Yards on August 4 when he also drove in a season-high five RBI in his first match against his previous team. In 69 games for Baltimore, McCann slashed .222/.269/.377 with six home runs, 26 RBI, and three stolen bases.

McCann pitched in an MLB game twice, both with the Orioles. His first was a scoreless eighth inning in a 10–3 loss to the San Diego Padres at Petco Park on August 15, 2023, when he got three ground-ball outs around a pair of one-out hits. The second was another eighth-inning outing the following year in a 19–8 away defeat to the Oakland Athletics on July 6, 2024, when he surrendered a two-out, two-run homer to Kyle McCann who was pinch-hitting for Brent Rooker.

McCann played the entirety of an 11–5 home victory over the Toronto Blue Jays in game 1 of a doubleheader on July 29, 2024, despite being hit in the nose by a Yariel Rodríguez fastball in the first inning. Instead of going on the injured list, he played an entire game as starting catcher in a 10–4 win over the same opponent two days later on July 31, wearing a protective face mask while batting. He was named the Orioles' nominee for the 2024 Roberto Clemente Award. McCann made 64 appearances for the Orioles during the 2024 campaign, batting .234/.279/.388 with eight home runs and 31 RBI.

=== Atlanta Braves ===
On March 17, 2025, McCann signed a minor league contract with the Atlanta Braves. In 42 appearances split between the Double-A Columbus Clingstones and Triple-A Gwinnett Stripers, he batted a combined .305/.341/.510 with six home runs, 32 RBI, and one stolen base. McCann was released by the Braves organization on June 22.

=== Arizona Diamondbacks ===
On June 23, 2025, McCann signed a major league contract with the Arizona Diamondbacks. He made his team debut on June 25 against the Chicago White Sox. In 42 appearances for the Diamondbacks, McCann batted .260/.324/.431 with five home runs and 17 RBI.

On November 21, 2025, McCann re-signed with the Diamondbacks on a one-year, $2.75 million contract.

== Personal life ==
McCann and his wife, Jessica, were married in November 2014. They reside in Nashville, Tennessee. The couple had their first children, a set of twins, in December 2017. He is an avid hunter, including an annual preseason duck hunt along the Mississippi flyway near Carlisle, Arkansas.
