= Mark Hardy (baseball) =

- Pitcher
- Born: May 3, 1988 (age 37); Campbell River, British Columbia, Canada
- Bats: Left Throws: Left
- Stats at Baseball Reference
Medals
Men's baseball
Representing Canada
Baseball World Cup
Bronze medal – third place	2011 Panama City	Team
Pan American Games
Gold medal – first place	2011 Guadalajara	Team

Mark R. Hardy (born May 3, 1988) is a Canadian former professional baseball pitcher. Prior to beginning his professional career, he played college baseball at the University of British Columbia. Hardy has also competed for the Canadian national baseball team.

== Career ==
Hardy enrolled at the University of British Columbia (UBC), where he played college baseball for the UBC Thunderbirds baseball team, competing in the National Association of Intercollegiate Athletics. Hardy had a 17–3 win–loss record in his junior and senior seasons at UBC. He played collegiate summer baseball for the Okotoks Dawgs in the Western Major Baseball League.

"Mark's not overpowering. But he's got good stuff and he keeps the ball down. He also has a little pause in his delivery that throws off the hitter's timing. He has a chance. Everyone likes the way he competes."

— Shawn Wooten, manager of the Fort Wayne TinCaps

The San Diego Padres selected Hardy in the 43rd round (1,294th overall) of the 2010 Major League Baseball draft. He received a $1,000 signing bonus and a plane ticket upon signing. In 2010, Hardy played for the Arizona League Padres of the Rookie-level Arizona League, the Eugene Emeralds of the Class-A Short Season Northwest League, and the Lake Elsinore Storm of the Class-A Advanced California League. In 2011, he pitched for the Fort Wayne TinCaps of the Class-A Midwest League.

Hardy has played for the Canadian national baseball team. He appeared in the 2008 World University Baseball Championship, winning the earned run average (ERA) award, with a 0.00 ERA in round-robin play. In 2011, he participated in the Baseball World Cup, winning the bronze medal, and the Pan American Games, winning the gold medal.
