= Tuffy Gosewisch =

American baseball player (born 1983)

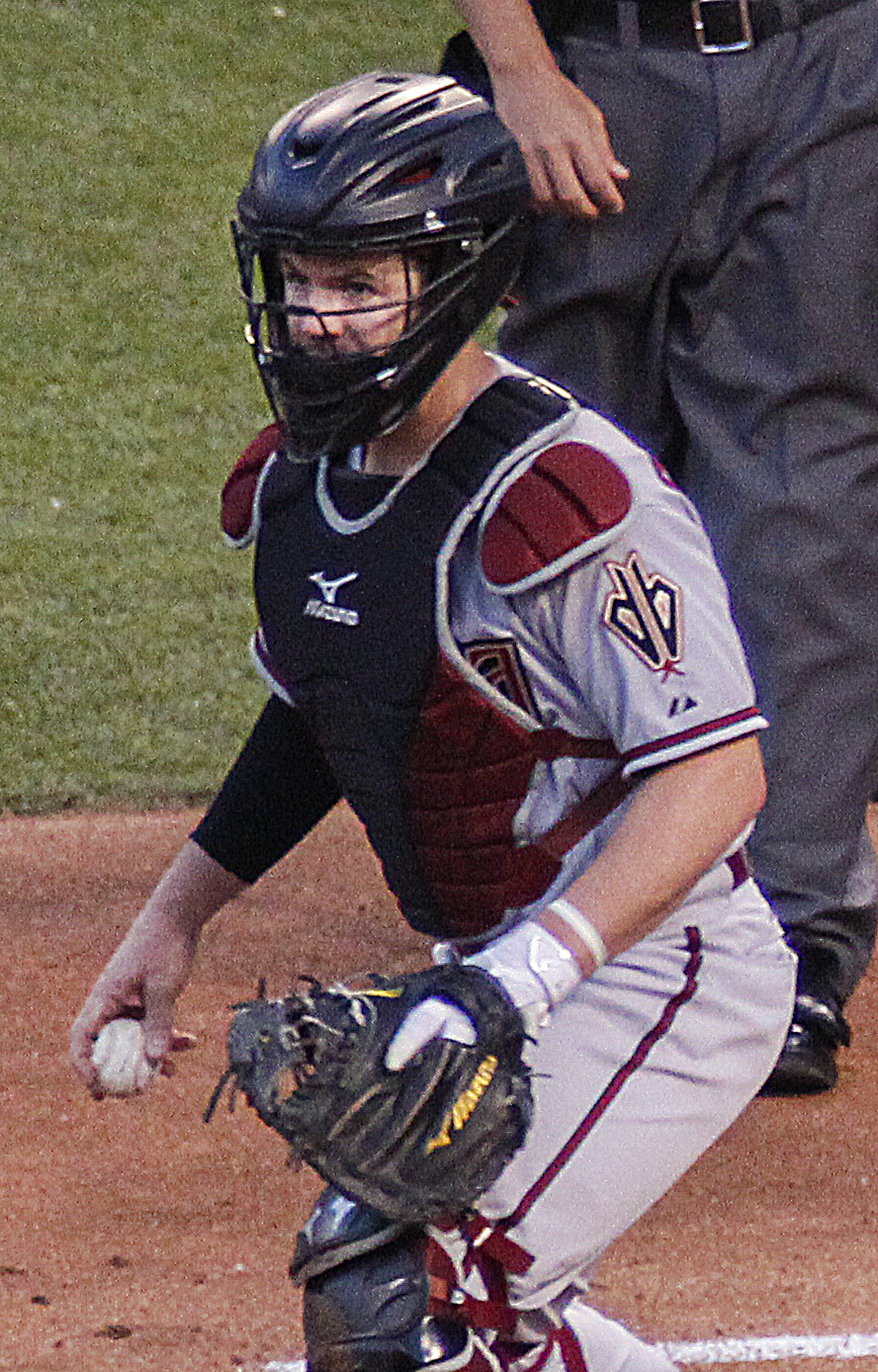
- Gosewisch with the Arizona Diamondbacks
- Catcher
- Born: August 17, 1983 (age 43); Freeport, Illinois, U.S.
- Batted: Right Threw: Right

MLB debut
- August 1, 2013, for the Arizona Diamondbacks

Last MLB appearance
- May 21, 2017, for the Seattle Mariners

MLB statistics
- Batting average: .190
- Home runs: 5
- Runs batted in: 30
- Stats at Baseball Reference

Teams
- Arizona Diamondbacks (2013–2016); Seattle Mariners (2017)
Medals
Men's baseball
Representing United States
Pan American Games
Silver medal – second place	2011 Guadalajara	National team

James Benjamin "Tuffy" Gosewisch (born August 17, 1983), is an American former professional baseball catcher. He played in Major League Baseball (MLB) for the Arizona Diamondbacks and Seattle Mariners. Prior to beginning his professional career, he played college baseball at Arizona State University. Gosewisch has also competed for the United States national baseball team.

== Amateur career ==
Gosewisch attended Horizon High School in Scottsdale, Arizona. He was named to the All-State team in his senior season. Undrafted out of high school, Gosewisch enrolled at Arizona State University, where he played college baseball for the Arizona State Sun Devils baseball team in the Pacific-10 Conference of NCAA Division I. He was named the Tempe Regional Most Valuable Player in the 2005 NCAA Division I baseball tournament, as the Sun Devils reached the 2005 College World Series. That season, he was named a semifinalist for the Johnny Bench Award, given to the best catcher in NCAA Division I.

Gosewisch played for the United States national baseball team in the 2011 Pan American Games, winning the silver medal. He also appeared in the 2011 Baseball World Cup.

== Professional career ==
=== Philadelphia Phillies ===
The Philadelphia Phillies drafted Gosewisch in the 11th round (337th overall) of the 2005 MLB draft. He made his professional debut with the Batavia Muckdogs of the Low–A New York–Penn League in 2005. He played for the Clearwater Threshers of the High–A Florida State League in 2006, and for the Threshers and the Lakewood BlueClaws of the Single–A South Atlantic League in 2007. He played for the Threshers in 2008, then served as the regular catcher for the Reading Phillies of the Double–A Eastern League from 2009 to 2012 aside from a stint with the Triple–A Lehigh Valley IronPigs of the International League in 2009. The Phillies invited him to spring training in 2012, but assigned him to Lehigh Valley that season.

=== Toronto Blue Jays ===
On July 31, 2012, the Toronto Blue Jays acquired Gosewisch from the Phillies and assigned him to the Triple–A Las Vegas 51s of the Pacific Coast League. He played for Las Vegas for he rest of the season and became a free agent after the season.

=== Arizona Diamondbacks ===
Gosewisch signed a minor-league contract with the Arizona Diamondbacks for the 2013 season. He started the season with the Triple–A Reno Aces of the Pacific Coast League. He hit .284 with seven home runs and 33 RBI for Reno, and the Diamondbacks selected his contract on August 1 and promoted him to the major leagues, where he replaced catcher Miguel Montero, whom the Diamondbacks placed on the disabled list. Gosewisch made his major league debut the same day. He got his first major-league hit, a single, in the same game. Arizona optioned him back to Reno on August 26, and later recalled him on September 3 after major league rosters expanded to 40 players. Overall, Gosewisch played in 45 games for Arizona in 2013, batting .178 with three RBI.

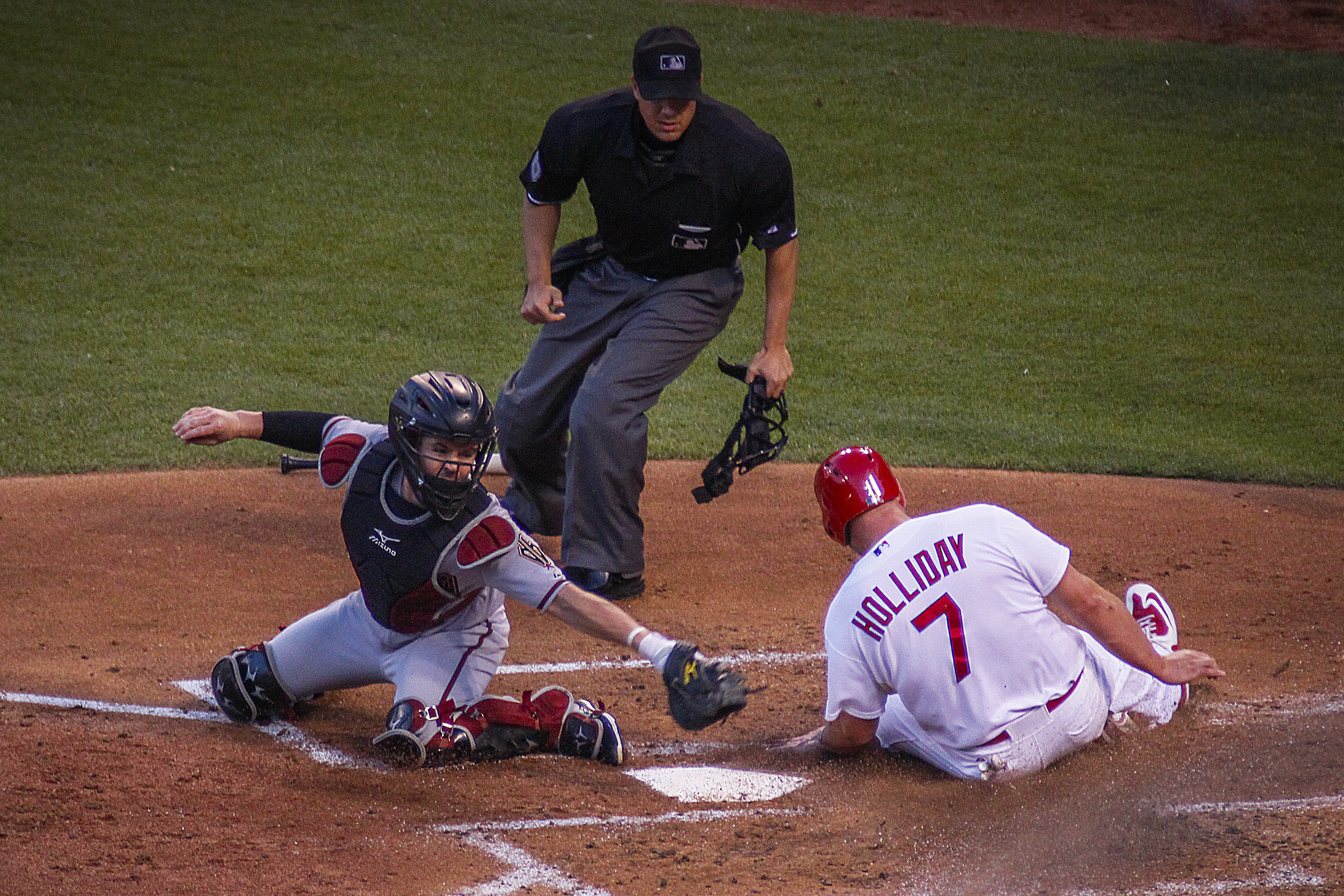
Gosewisch and a sliding Matt Holliday in 2015

Gosewisch made the Diamondbacks' 2014 25-man roster; at 30 years of age, it was Gosewisch's first time on an Opening Day roster. He traveled with the Diamondbacks to Sydney, Australia, for the 2014 opening series against the Los Angeles Dodgers, where he pinch hit in the ninth slot in the eighth inning of the second game of the series and flied out to left field. He spent the entire season with the Diamondbacks, appearing in 41 games and batting .225, with one home run and seven RBI.

Gosewisch began the 2015 season as the Diamondbacks' starting catcher. On June 2, however, he was declared out for the season after tearing his left anterior cruciate ligament. He played in 38 games before his injury, batting .211 with one home run and 13 RBI.

During spring training in 2016, Gosewisch batted only .132, while catcher Chris Herrmann, who the Diamondbacks had acquired in a trade in November 2015, hit .229. To make room for Hermann to serve as their Opening Day back-up catcher, Arizona optioned Gosewisch to Reno on March 31, two days before the start of the season. Gosewisch hit .342 for Reno, with nine home runs and 26 RBIs. The Diamondbacks called him up, and on July 3 he made his major-league season debut, singling in his first at bat. In 33 games with Arizona, he hit .156, with three home runs and seven RBI.

=== Seattle Mariners ===
Gosewisch was claimed off waivers by the Atlanta Braves on November 18, 2016. On November 30, he signed a one-year contract with the team worth $635,000. The Braves designated him for assignment in January 2017.

On January 26, 2017, the Seattle Mariners claimed Gosewisch off waivers. He began the season with the Triple–A Tacoma Rainiers of the Pacific Coast League. The Mariners called him up on May 5. He went 2-for-28 (.075) in 11 games for Seattle, and the Mariners optioned him back to Tacoma on May 22. The Mariners designated him for assignment on August 6 and assigned him outright to Tacoma on August 10. During the 2017 season, he hit .229 with four home runs and RBI in 85 games for Tacoma.

Gosewisch re-signed with Seattle on a minor-league deal on November 6, 2017. He failed to make the major-league roster out of spring training in 2018, and the Mariners released him, on April 5, 2018.

=== Washington Nationals ===
On April 13, 2018, Gosewisch signed a minor league contract with the Washington Nationals. The Nationals assigned him to the Triple–A Syracuse Chiefs in the International League, for whom he batted .219/.310/.335 with three home runs and 25 RBI across 73 games. Gosewisch elected free agency following the season on November 2.

=== Milwaukee Brewers ===
On December 7, 2018, Gosewisch signed a minor league contract with the Milwaukee Brewers that included an invitation to spring training. He spent the 2019 season with the Triple–A San Antonio Missions, playing in 49 games and slashing .205/.299/.308 with three home runs and nine RBI. Gosewisch elected free agency following the season on November 4, 2019.

On January 9, 2020, Gosewisch re-signed with the Brewers on a minor league contract. He did not play in a game in 2020 due to the cancellation of the minor league season because of the COVID-19 pandemic. Gosewisch became a free agent on November 2.

In the offseason, Gosewisch retired and joined X10 Capital as the director of baseball relations.

== Post-playing career ==
In 2023, Gosewisch was announced as a broadcaster for a series of Spring Training webcasts of Diamondbacks games.

As of October 2026, Gosewich is listed as a member of the Baseball Operations team for X10 Capital, a sports-focused private equity firm.

== Personal life ==
Gosewisch's father gave him the nickname "Tuffy" when he was six months old, because he was an especially destructive baby. "I used to break my crib and fall out and just keep on going and it wouldn't faze me," recalls Gosewisch.

He met his wife, Kyleyn, at Arizona State.
