= Chris Kissock =

Canadian baseball player (born 1985)

- Pitcher
- Born: May 2, 1985 (age 40); Trail, British Columbia
- Bats: Right Throws: Right
- Stats at Baseball Reference
Medals
Men's baseball
Representing Canada
Baseball World Cup
Bronze medal – third place	2011 Panama City	Team
Pan American Games
Gold medal – first place	2011 Guadalajara	Team

Christopher R. Kissock (born May 2, 1985, in Trail, British Columbia) is a Canadian former professional baseball pitcher who was in the minor league baseball organization of the Philadelphia Phillies of Major League Baseball, but is currently retired from the Winnipeg Goldeyes after being released by the Phillies on August 3, 2012. Kissock has also competed for the Canadian national baseball team.

Kissock attended J. Lloyd Crowe Secondary School and Lewis–Clark State College. He was drafted by the Philadelphia Phillies in the 9th round (293rd overall) of the 2007 Major League Baseball draft.

Kissock has played for the Canadian national baseball team. In 2011, he participated in the 2011 Baseball World Cup, winning the bronze medal, and the Pan American Games, winning the gold medal.
