= Drew Garcia =

American baseball player (born 1986)

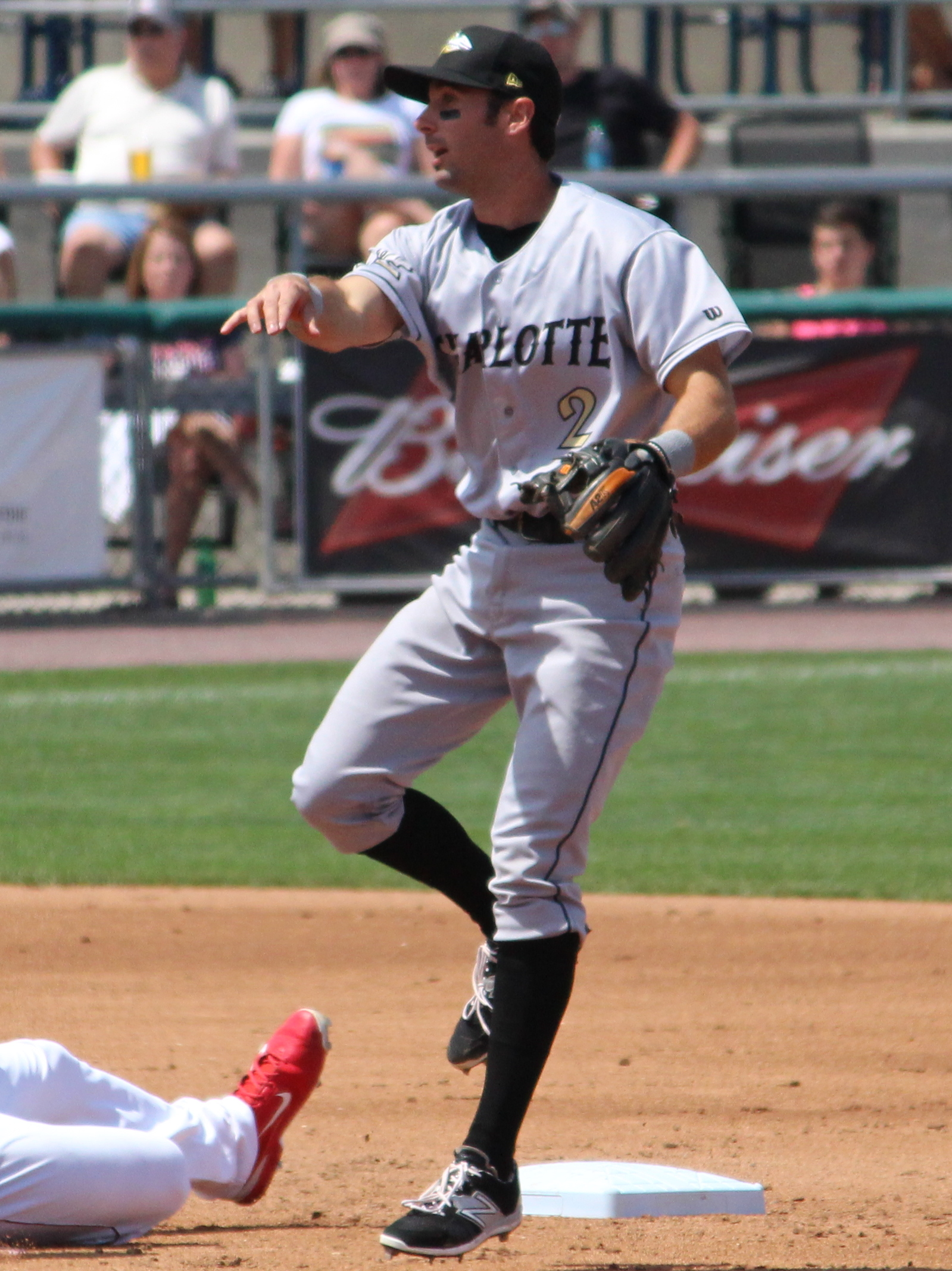
- Garcia with the Charlotte Knights in 2015
- Second baseman
- Born: April 22, 1986 (age 40); El Cajon, California, U.S.
- Bats: Switch Throws: Right
- Stats at Baseball Reference
Medals
Men's baseball
Representing United States
Pan American Games
Silver medal – second place	2011 Guadalajara	National team

Andrew James Garcia (born April 22, 1986) is an American former professional baseball second baseman. Prior to beginning his professional career, he played college baseball at the University of California, Riverside. Garcia has also competed for the United States national baseball team.

== Career ==
Garcia attended Valhalla High School. He went to college at University of California, Riverside, where he played college baseball for the UC Riverside Highlanders baseball team in the Big West Conference of the National Collegiate Athletic Association's (NCAA) Division I. He was Big West Conference All-Star second baseman in 2008.

=== Chicago White Sox ===
Garcia was then selected by Chicago White Sox in the 21st round (630th overall) of the 2008 Major League Baseball draft. He made his professional debut in 2008 with the Bristol White Sox of the rookie-level Appalachian League. In 2009, he played for the Kannapolis Intimidators of the Single-A South Atlantic League. He played for the Winston-Salem Dash of the High-A Carolina League in 2010, in which he was recognized as having the best season among all White Sox minor league second baseman, despite missing time due to a torn ankle ligament. In 2011, he played for the Birmingham Barons of the Double-A Southern League and the Charlotte Knights of the Triple-A International League.

Garcia played for the United States national baseball team in the 2011 Baseball World Cup and the 2011 Pan American Games, winning the silver medal. Garcia split the 2012 season between Birmingham and Charlotte, playing in 132 total games and hitting .256/.314/.368 with six home runs, 75 RBI, and five stolen bases. He began 2013 with Charlotte, hitting .222 with 12 RBI over 24 appearances.

=== Colorado Rockies ===
On May 26, 2013, the White Sox traded Garcia to the Colorado Rockies organization. He spent the remainder of the year with the Triple-A Colorado Springs Sky Sox, hitting .236/.281/.326 with one home run, 11 RBI, and three stolen bases across 52 appearances. Garcia returned to Colorado Springs in 2014, playing in 96 games and batting .237/.293/.345 with four home runs, 36 RBI, and six stolen bases.

=== Chicago White Sox (second stint) ===
On January 20, 2015, Garcia signed a minor league contract with the Chicago White Sox organization. In 88 games split between the Double-A Montgomery Biscuits and Triple-A Charlotte Knights, he slashed .227/.272/.298 with one home run, 17 RBI, and four stolen bases. Garcia elected free agency following the season on November 6.

== Personal life ==
Garcia's grandfather, Dave Garcia, is a retired Major League Baseball (MLB) player and manager. His brother, Greg, played in MLB.
