= Nick Bucci =

Canadian baseball player (born 1990)

- Pitcher
- Born: July 16, 1990 (age 36); Sarnia, Ontario, Canada
- Bats: Right Throws: Right
- Stats at Baseball Reference
Medals
Men's baseball
Representing Canada
Baseball World Cup
Bronze medal – third place	2011 Panama City	Team
Pan American Games
Gold medal – first place	2011 Guadalajara	Team

Nicholas B. Bucci (born July 16, 1990) is a Canadian former professional baseball pitcher. Bucci competed for the Canadian national baseball team in international competition.

== Career ==
Bucci attended St. Patrick's High School in Sarnia, Ontario. Bucci committed to enroll at Bradley University on a college baseball scholarship to play for the Bradley Braves baseball team, but when the Milwaukee Brewers drafted Bucci in the 18th round (548th overall) of the 2008 Major League Baseball draft, he opted to sign with the Brewers, forgoing his collegiate career.

Bucci made his professional debut that season with the Arizona League Brewers of the rookie-level Arizona League. In 2009, he pitched for the Helena Brewers of the Rookie-level Pioneer League, where he was named a Pioneer League All-Star pitcher. Bucci received a brief promotion to the Huntsville Stars of the Double-A Southern League. In 2010, the Brewers assigned Bucci to the Wisconsin Timber Rattlers of the Single-A Midwest League, where he had a 15 1/3 scoreless innings pitched streak and was a midseason All-Star. In 2011, Bucci was promoted to the Brevard County Manatees in the High-A Florida State League.

Bucci has played for the Canadian national baseball team. He participated in the 2009 Baseball World Cup. In 2011, he participated in the 2011 Baseball World Cup, winning the bronze medal, and the Pan American Games, winning the gold medal. Along with his teammates, Bucci was inducted into the Canadian Baseball Hall of Fame in 2012.

On November 20, 2012, the Brewers added Bucci to their 40-man roster to protect him from the Rule 5 draft. He made one appearance for the AZL Brewers in 2013, missing the majority of the season with a shoulder injury. On October 4, 2013, Bucci was removed from the 40-man roster and sent outright to the Triple-A Nashville Sounds. On January 7, 2014, Bucci was released by the Brewers organization.
