= Cole Armstrong =

Canadian baseball catcher (born 1983)

Kamloops NorthPaws
- Catcher/Manager
- Born: August 24, 1983 (age 42); Surrey, British Columbia, Canada
- Bats: Left Throws: Right
- Stats at Baseball Reference
Medals
Men's baseball
Representing Canada
Baseball World Cup
Bronze medal – third place	2009 Nettuno	Team
Pan American Games
Gold medal – first place	2011 Guadalajara	Team

Melville Cole Armstrong (born August 24, 1983) is a Canadian former professional baseball catcher and current manager for the Kamloops NorthPaws, who has played in international competition with the Canada national baseball team.

== Career ==
While attending high school at Delphi Academy in Langley, British Columbia, Armstrong played multiple seasons for the Whalley Chiefs of the B.C. Premier Baseball League. He played for Canada at the 2000 World Junior Baseball Championship in Sherbrooke, Quebec.

Armstrong, who also played at Chipola (Fla.) Junior College, was drafted by the New York Mets in the 32nd Round of 2001 Draft but did not sign. He was drafted again by the Atlanta Braves in the 12th round (487th overall) of the 2003 Major League Baseball draft. He played one year for the University of Kansas Jayhawks in 2002 before entering the Minor League. After stints with the Gulf Coast League Braves in 2003, the Danville Braves in 2004 and the Rome Braves in 2005, Armstrong was picked by the White Sox that winter in the Rule 5 Draft.

He split parts of the next two seasons between the Winston-Salem Warthogs and the Birmingham Barons.

He re-signed with Chicago on Feb. 27, 2008 for a one-year deal and signed another one-year contract for $400,000 with the White Sox on Feb. 24, 2009. Halfway through the 2008 season, Armstrong was promoted to the Triple-A Charlotte Knights where he remained through the 2009 season.

Armstrong was designated for assignment on January 12, 2010.

On January 19, 2010, Cole was out-righted to Triple-A Charlotte. He finished the 2010 season with the Birmingham Barons.

He joined the Los Angeles Angels of Anaheim organization in 2011 and was assigned to the Triple-A Salt Lake City Bees.

Armstrong became a coach with the AZL White Sox in 2014.

== See also ==
- Rule 5 draft results
