= Chris Bisson (baseball) =

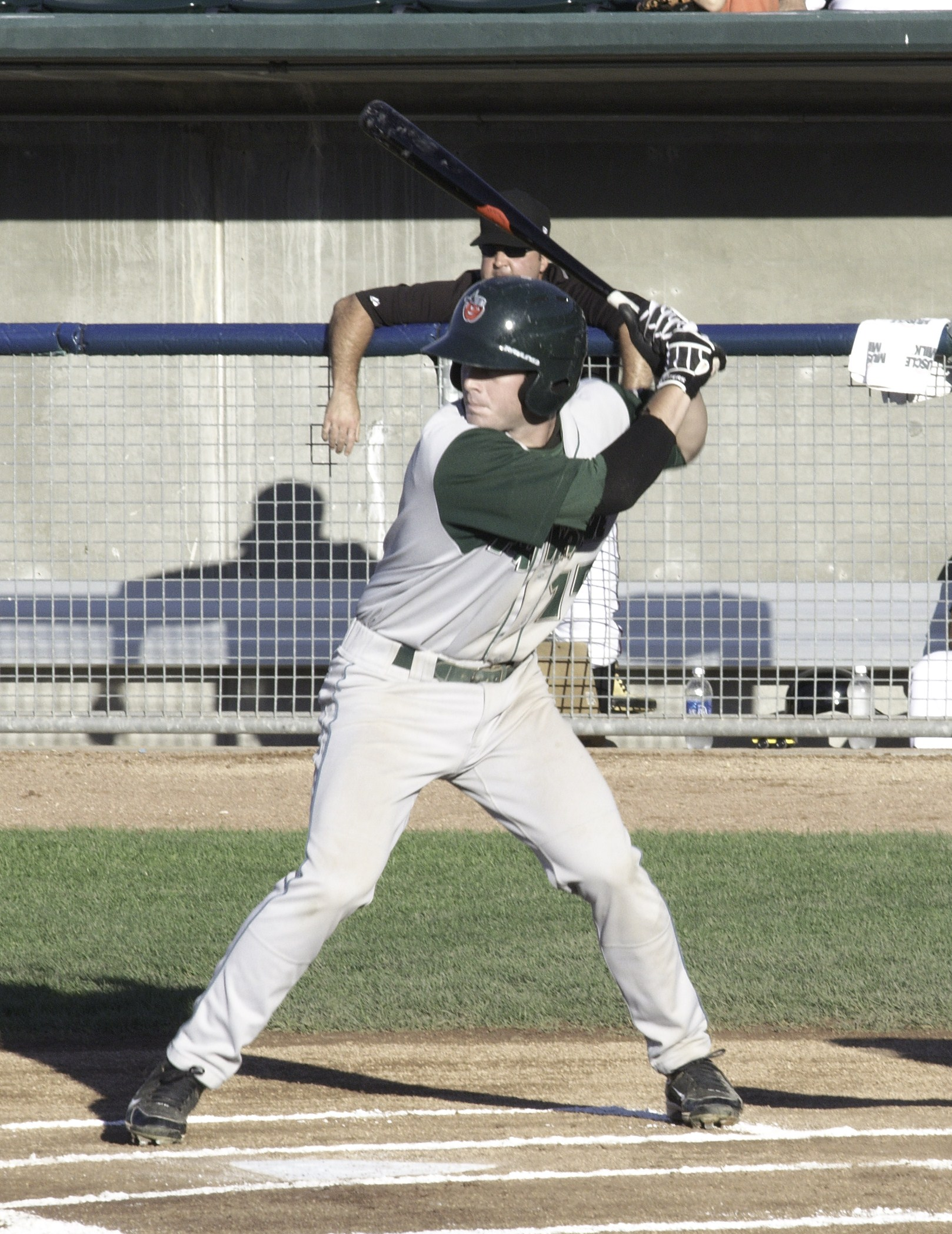
- Bisson batting for the Fort Wayne TinCaps
- Second baseman
- Born: August 14, 1989 (age 36); Orleans, Ontario, Canada
- Bats: Left Throws: Right
- Stats at Baseball Reference
Medals
Men's baseball
Representing Canada
Baseball World Cup
Bronze medal – third place	2011 Panama City	Team
Pan American Games
Gold medal – first place	2011 Guadalajara	Team

Christian Darcy Bisson (born August 14, 1989) is a Canadian professional baseball second baseman in minor league baseball organization of the San Diego Padres of Major League Baseball. Prior to beginning his professional career, he played college baseball at the University of Kentucky. Bisson has also competed for the Canadian national baseball team.

== Career ==
Bisson went to high school at École secondaire catholique Béatrice-Desloges. He attended the University of Kentucky, where he played college baseball for the Kentucky Wildcats baseball team in the Southeastern Conference (SEC) of the National Collegiate Athletic Association's (NCAA) Division I. Bisson filled in as a third baseman in 2008 due to injury, becoming the team's starting second baseman in 2009. Bisson was named to the All-SEC second team at second base in 2009 and 2010. In 2009, he played collegiate summer baseball with the Cotuit Kettleers of the Cape Cod Baseball League.

He was drafted by the San Diego Padres in the fourth round (124th overall) of the 2010 Major League Baseball draft. After signing with the Padres, Bisson made his professional debut with the Eugene Emeralds of the Class-A Short Season Northwest League, and played five games for the Arizona League Padres of the Rookie-level Arizona League. In 2011, Bisson was invited to a special mini-camp for prospects, and played for the Fort Wayne TinCaps of the Class-A Midwest League, Lake Elsinore Storms of California League and the San Antonio Missions ( AA ) of the Texas League.

Bisson played for the Canadian national baseball team. In 2011, he participated in the 2011 Baseball World Cup, winning the bronze medal, and the Pan American Games, winning the gold medal. Along with his teammates, Bisson was inducted into the Canadian Baseball Hall of Fame in 2012.

Due to recurring injury he retired in July 2013.
