= Jay Johnson (pitcher) =

Canadian baseball player

- Pitcher
- Born: December 21, 1989 (age 36); Sussex Corner, New Brunswick, Canada
- Bats: Right Throws: Left
- Stats at Baseball Reference
Medals
Men's baseball
Representing Canada
Baseball World Cup
Bronze medal – third place	2011 Panama City	Team
Pan American Games
Gold medal – first place	2011 Guadalajara	Team

Jay Robert Johnson (born December 21, 1989) is a Canadian professional baseball pitcher who is a free agent. Prior to beginning his professional career, he played college baseball at Texas Tech University. He has also competed for the Canadian national baseball team.

== Career ==
Johnson went to Vauxhall High School in Vauxhall, Alberta, then enrolled at Lethbridge College. He transferred to Texas Tech University, where he played college baseball for the Texas Tech Red Raiders baseball team in the Big 12 Conference of NCAA Division I.

Johnson was selected by the Baltimore Orioles in the 25th round of the 2009 MLB draft and the Toronto Blue Jays in the 26th round of the 2010 MLB draft, but did not sign with either club due to concerns about the health of his left elbow. Johnson signed with the Philadelphia Phillies prior to the 2011 season. He pitched for the Lakewood BlueClaws of the Class-A South Atlantic League in 2011, pitching to a 1–5 win–loss record, a 2.94 earned run average and five saves in 40 appearances.

== International career ==
Johnson played for the Canada national baseball team.

In 2011, he participated in the 2011 Baseball World Cup, winning the bronze medal, and the Pan American Games, winning the gold medal.

In 2013, he participated in the 2013 World Baseball Classic. During the Pool D Play portion, Johnson was seen throwing haymakers as part of the brawl with Team Mexico.

On January 9, 2019, he selected in the 2019 Pan American Games Qualifier.
