= Pete Andrelczyk =

American baseball player

- Pitcher
- Born: November 10, 1985 (age 40); Lancaster, Pennsylvania, U.S.
- Bats: Right Throws: Right
- Stats at Baseball Reference
Medals
Men's baseball
Representing United States
Pan American Games
Silver medal – second place	2011 Guadalajara	National team

Peter Andrelczyk (born November 10, 1985) is an American former professional baseball pitcher. He was previously in the Miami Marlins organization. Before beginning his professional career, he played college baseball at Coastal Carolina University. He has also competed for the United States national baseball team.

== Career ==
Andrelczyk attended Manheim Township High School in Manheim Township of Lancaster County, Pennsylvania. Undrafted out of high school, Andrelczyk enrolled at Coastal Carolina University, where he played college baseball for the Coastal Carolina Chanticleers baseball team in the Big South Conference of NCAA Division I. A relief pitcher, Andrelczyk served as the team's closer.

He was selected by the Baltimore Orioles in the 32nd round (968th overall) of the 2007 Major League Baseball draft, but did not sign, opting to return to Coastal Carolina for his senior season. He was selected by the Marlins in the fifth round (148th overall) of the 2008 MLB draft, and signed. He made his professional debut with the Jamestown Jammers of the Class-A Short Season New York–Penn League, before being promoted to the Greensboro Grasshoppers of the Class-A South Atlantic League, in 2008. He played for the Grasshoppers and Jupiter Hammerheads of the Class-A Advanced Florida State League in 2009. He began the 2010 season in Jupiter, and was promoted to the Jacksonville Suns of the Class-AA Southern League that season. He started the 2011 season in Jacksonville, before receiving a promotion to the New Orleans Zephyrs of the Class-AAA Pacific Coast League.

Andrelczyk played for the United States national baseball team in the 2011 Baseball World Cup and 2011 Pan American Games, winning the silver medal.
