= Tim Smith (baseball) =

Canadian baseball player (born 1986)

- Outfielder
- Born: June 14, 1986 (age 40); Toronto, Ontario, Canada
- Bats: Left Throws: Left
- Stats at Baseball Reference
Medals
Men's baseball
Representing Canada
Baseball World Cup
Bronze medal – third place	2011 Panama City	Team
Pan American Games
Gold medal – first place	2011 Guadalajara	Team
Gold medal – first place	2015 Toronto	Team

Timothy James Smith (born June 14, 1986) is a Canadian former professional baseball outfielder. Prior to beginning his professional career, he played college baseball at Arizona State University. Smith has also competed for the Canadian national baseball team.

== Amateur career ==
Smith attended Birchmount Park Collegiate Institute, where he was named to the High School Baseball All-Star Team by the Toronto Star after his senior year. Drafted by the New York Mets in the 21st round (614th overall) of the 2004 Major League Baseball (MLB) draft, Smith opted to go to college instead of signing. He enrolled at Midland College, a junior college, where he set school records for career average (.459), OBP (.547), slugging (.736) and steals (41). and after one season, Smith was drafted by the Milwaukee Brewers in the 17th round (505th overall) of the 2005 MLB draft, but again, he did not sign.

Smith transferred to Arizona State University, where he played college baseball for the Arizona State Sun Devils baseball team in the Pacific-10 Conference of the NCAA Division I. The Sun Devils reached the 2007 College World Series.

== Professional career ==
=== Texas Rangers ===
"That's the first time ever seeing Tim Smith -- he's a great baseball player. He's one to look out for down the road, if not next year. He's the type of guy you wanted up with runners on base because you knew he was going to produce. He did well for us in Panama and then again at the Pan American Games. It was exciting to watch him play."

— Michael Crouse

Smith was drafted by the Texas Rangers in the 7th round, with the 230th overall selection, of the 2007 Major League Baseball draft. He made his professional debut with the Low-A Spokane Indians, hitting .284 with one home run, nine RBI, and one stolen base across 23 games.

Smith was a Midwest League All-Star in 2008, winning All-Star Game Most Valuable Player honors; in 121 appearances on the year for with the Single-A Clinton LumberKings, he batted .300/.359/.450 with 13 home runs, 70 RBI, and 21 stolen bases. Smith split the 2009 campaign between the rookie-level Arizona League Rangers, High-A Bakersfield Blaze, and Double-A Frisco RoughRiders, slashing a cumulative .321/.392/.465 with eight home runs, 53 RBI, and 17 stolen bases.

=== Kansas City Royals ===
On September 3, 2009, the Rangers traded Smith and Manny Piña to the Kansas City Royals in exchange for Danny Gutiérrez. Smith was a Texas League All-Star in 2010, batting .306/.372/.453 with nine home runs, 50 RBI, and 15 stolen bases in 95 appearances for the Double-A Northwest Arkansas Naturals.

Smith made 73 appearances split between the rookie-level Arizona League Royals and Northwest Arkansas in 2011, slashing a cumulative .301/.359/.494 with 10 home runs, 49 RBI, and 10 stolen bases. Offered the choice between serving as a backup in Triple-A or being released, Smith opted for free agency, and was released by Kansas City on March 29, 2012.

=== Atlanta Braves ===
On April 27, 2012, Smith signed a minor league contract with the Atlanta Braves organization. He played in 70 games split between the High-A Lynchburg Hillcats and Double-A Mississippi Braves, hitting a combined .288/.372/.386 with three home runs, 28 RBI, and three stolen bases. Smith elected free agency following the season on November 2.

=== Winnipeg Goldeyes ===
On January 8, 2013, Smith signed a minor league contract with the Baltimore Orioles organization. He did not make the team and was released prior to the start of the season. On April 4, Smith signed with the Winnipeg Goldeyes of the American Association of Independent Professional Baseball. In 21 games for Winnipeg, he batted .254/.315/.328 with one home run, six RBI, and one stolen base.

=== Québec Capitales ===
Smith signed with the Québec Capitales of the Frontier League prior to 2014 season, ultimately playing in 35 games and batting .236/.327/.244 with 15 RBI and two stolen bases.

Smith made 63 appearances for Québec in 2015, slashing .238/.354/.302 with one home run, 31 RBI, and nine stolen bases.

== International career ==
Smith has played for the Canadian national baseball team. In 2011, he participated in the 2011 Baseball World Cup, winning the bronze medal, and the Pan American Games, winning the gold medal. At the Pan American Games, Smith was second on the Canadian team in batting average (.350) and on-base plus slugging percentage (.985).

== Coaching career ==
On April 9, 2019, the Québec Capitales of the Frontier League hired Smith as part of their coaching staff.
