= Andy Van Hekken =

American baseball player (born 1979)

- Starting pitcher
- Born: July 31, 1979 (age 46); Holland, Michigan, U.S.
- Batted: Right Threw: Left

Professional debut
- MLB: September 3, 2002, for the Detroit Tigers
- CPBL: August 21, 2007, for the Macoto Cobras
- KBO: April 13, 2012, for the Nexen Heroes
- NPB: March 27, 2016, for the Saitama Seibu Lions

Last appearance
- MLB: September 27, 2002, for the Detroit Tigers
- NPB: July 8, 2016, for the Saitama Seibu Lions
- KBO: September 29, 2017, for the Nexen Heroes
- CPBL: October 14, 2018, for the Uni-President 7-Eleven Lions

MLB statistics
- Win–loss record: 1–3
- Earned run average: 3.00
- Strikeouts: 5

KBO statistics
- Win–loss record: 73–42
- Earned run average: 3.56
- Strikeouts: 860

NPB statistics
- Win–loss record: 0–4
- Earned run average: 6.31
- Strikeouts: 35

CPBL statistics
- Win–loss record: 4–6
- Earned run average: 4.24
- Strikeouts: 46
- Stats at Baseball Reference

Teams
- Detroit Tigers (2002); Macoto Cobras (2007); Nexen Heroes (2012–2015); Saitama Seibu Lions (2016); Nexen Heroes (2016–2017); Uni-President 7-Eleven Lions (2018)

Career highlights and awards
- KBO: KBO League Golden Glove Award (2014); KBO wins leader (2014)
Medals
Men's baseball
Representing United States
Pan American Games
| Silver medal – second place | 2011 Guadalajara | National team |

Andrew William Van Hekken (born July 31, 1979) is an American former professional baseball pitcher. He played in Major League Baseball (MLB) for the Detroit Tigers, the Chinese Professional Baseball League (CPBL) for the Macoto Cobras and Uni-President 7-Eleven Lions, the KBO League for the Nexen Heroes, and Nippon Professional Baseball (NPB) for the Saitama Seibu Lions.

== Early years ==
He attended Lakeview Elementary School and later Holland High School in Michigan.

== Professional career ==
Van Hekken was drafted by the Seattle Mariners in the third round of the 1998 MLB draft.

In 1999, he was traded to the Detroit Tigers along with Jerry Amador for Brian Hunter. He made his Major League debut in September 2002. In his first Major League appearance, he threw a complete game shutout for a victory against the Cleveland Indians. As of March 2017, he was the last Major League pitcher to pitch a complete-game shutout in his debut. In 5 starts for the Tigers, he sported an ERA of 3.00 in 30 innings pitched, he had the same amount of strikeouts (5) as starts (5). He finished with a 1.5 K/9. He would never be called up to the Majors again in his career.

After becoming a free agent in 2004, Van Hekken bounced around multiple organizations. From 2005 to 2011 he has pitched for Cincinnati Reds, Atlanta Braves, Florida Marlins, Kansas City Royals and the Houston Astros. With Houston, he remained with them from 2008 to 2011, pitching no higher than Triple-A.

Van Hekken signed a one-year contract for the 2014 season with the Nexen Heroes for his second season with the team in the Korea Baseball Organization. In 2016, he signed with the Seibu Lions of the Pacific League in Nippon Professional Baseball. He was released on July 15. Van Hekken returned to the Nexen Heroes for the remainder of the 2016 season and the 2017 season. He became a free agent following the 2017 season.

On April 17, 2018, Van Hekken signed with the New Britain Bees of the Atlantic League of Professional Baseball. He left the team on August 14, 2018, to sign with the Uni-President Lions of the Chinese Professional Baseball League.

Van Hekken retired following the 2018 season.

== Post-playing career ==
In 2023, Van Hekken was hired as a pitching coach at Calvin University.
