= Justin Cassel =

American baseball player (born 1984)

- Pitcher
- Born: September 25, 1984 (age 42); Los Angeles, California, U.S.
- Bats: Right Throws: Right
- Stats at Baseball Reference
Medals
Men's baseball
Representing United States
Pan American Games
Silver medal – second place	2011 Guadalajara	National team

Justin J. Cassel (born September 25, 1984) is an American former professional baseball pitcher. Prior to beginning his professional career, he played college baseball at the University of California, Irvine. Cassel has also competed for the United States national baseball team.

== Career ==
=== Amateur ===
Cassel attended Chatsworth High School, where he set single season records in wins, strikeouts and shutouts. Cassel was named First Team High School All-American. He was drafted by the Oakland Athletics in the 30th round (902nd overall) of the 2003 Major League Baseball draft, but he did not sign. He went to college at University of California, Irvine, where he played college baseball for the UC Irvine Anteaters baseball team in the Big West Conference of the National Collegiate Athletic Association's (NCAA) Division I. In 2004, he played collegiate summer baseball with the Chatham A's of the Cape Cod Baseball League.

=== Chicago White Sox ===
Cassel was then selected by the Chicago White Sox in the seventh round (225th overall) of 2006 Major League Baseball draft. He made his professional debut in 2006 with the Great Falls White Sox of the rookie-level Pioneer League, receiving a promotion to the Winston-Salem Warthogs of the High-A Carolina League. In 2007, Cassel pitched for the Bristol White Sox of the rookie-level Appalachian League and Winston-Salem. In 2008, playing for the Double-A Birmingham Barons, Cassel was named to the Southern League All-Star team. He pitched for Birmingham and the Charlotte Knights of the Triple-A International League in 2009 and 2010. In 2011, he made a total of nine appearances for Bristol, Winston-Salem, and Charlotte. He pitched in the Venezuelan Winter League after the 2011 season.

Cassel played for the United States national baseball team in the 2011 Baseball World Cup and the 2011 Pan American Games, winning the silver medal.

=== Somerset Patriots ===
Cassel signed with the Somerset Patriots of the Atlantic League of Professional Baseball for the 2012 season. In 25 starts for Somerset, Cassel compiled a 6-11 record and 3.43 ERA with 115 strikeouts across 152 1/3 innings pitched.

== Personal life ==
Cassel's brother, Jack, has played in Major League Baseball, while his brother Matt was a quarterback in the National Football League.
