= Dustin Molleken =

Canadian baseball player (born 1984)

- Pitcher
- Born: August 21, 1984 (age 41); Regina, Saskatchewan, Canada
- Batted: Left Threw: Right

Professional debut
- NPB: August 2, 2012, for the Hokkaido Nippon Ham Fighters
- MLB: July 4, 2016, for the Detroit Tigers

Last appearance
- NPB: June 12, 2013, for the Hokkaido Nippon Ham Fighters
- MLB: July 29, 2016, for the Detroit Tigers

NPB statistics
- Win–loss record: 2–1
- Earned run average: 3.38
- Strikeouts: 23

MLB statistics
- Win–loss record: 0–0
- Earned run average: 4.32
- Strikeouts: 8
- Stats at Baseball Reference

Teams
- Hokkaido Nippon-Ham Fighters (2012–2013); Detroit Tigers (2016)

Career highlights and awards
- WBSC Premier12 All-World Team (2015)
Medals
Men's baseball
Representing Canada
Baseball World Cup
Bronze medal – third place	2011 Panama City	Team
Pan American Games
Gold medal – first place	2011 Guadalajara	Team
Silver medal – second place	2019 Lima	Team

Dustin Douglas Molleken (born August 21, 1984) is a Canadian former professional baseball pitcher. He played in Nippon Professional Baseball (NPB) for the Hokkaido Nippon-Ham Fighters, and in Major League Baseball (MLB) for the Detroit Tigers. Molleken has also competed for the Canadian national baseball team.

== Playing career ==
Molleken attended Cochrane High School in Regina, Saskatchewan, and Lethbridge Community College in Lethbridge, Alberta.

=== Pittsburgh Pirates ===
Dustin was drafted by the Pittsburgh Pirates in the 15th round (435th overall) of the 2003 MLB draft. He made his professional debut with the rookie-level Gulf Coast League Pirates. After not playing in a game in 2004, Molleken spent 2005 again with the GCL Pirates, allowing 24 runs in 30 innings of work. In 2006, Molleken spent the season in Low-A ball with the Williamsport Crosscutters, pitching to a 2.51 ERA with 22 strikeouts in 13 games. He split the 2007 season between three affiliates, the Low-A State College Spikes, the Single-A Hickory Crawdads, and the High-A Lynchburg Hillcats, accumulating a 3.92 ERA with 44 strikeouts in 39.0 innings for the three teams. He split 2008 between Lynchburg and Hickory, registering a 8-6 record and 6.40 ERA in 32 appearances. In 2009, he played for Lynchburg and the Double-A Altoona Curve, recording a 4.02 ERA in 36 games for the teams. He remained in Double-A with Altoona for the 2010 season, pitching to a 4-4 record and 4.15 ERA in 31 games. On November 6, 2010, Molleken elected free agency.

=== Colorado Rockies ===
Following the 2010 season, Molleken signed a minor league contract with the Colorado Rockies. He split the 2010 season between the Triple-A Colorado Springs Sky Sox and the Double-A Tulsa Drillers, pitching to a cumulative 5.05 ERA in 36 appearances. On November 14, 2011, Molleken re-signed with the Rockies on a minor league contract that included an invitation to Spring Training. He spent the year in Colorado Springs, and pitched to a 3-0 record and 5.18 ERA before being released to pursue an opportunity in Japan.

=== Hokkaido Nippon-Ham Fighters ===
On July 19, 2012, Molleken signed with the Hokkaido Nippon-Ham Fighters of Nippon Professional Baseball. Molleken appeared in 23 games for the Fighters in 2012, registering a 3.27 ERA in 22 innings. He played in the Japan Series for the Fighters that year as well. In 5 appearances for the Fighters in 2013, Molleken pitched to a 3.68 ERA with 5 strikeouts.

=== Milwaukee Brewers ===
On July 22, 2013, Molleken signed a minor league contract with the Milwaukee Brewers organization was assigned to the Triple-A Nashville Sounds. Molleken was invited to Spring Training with the Brewers for the 2014 season but did not make the team and was assigned to Nashville to begin the season. He pitched to a 4.84 ERA with 89 strikeouts in 74 1/3 innings for the Sounds in 2014 and elected free agency after the year.

=== Cleveland Indians ===
On November 18, 2014, Molleken signed a minor league contract with the Cleveland Indians organization. He spent the season with the Triple-A Columbus Clippers, pitching to a 5-3 record and 3.25 ERA in 40 appearances. On November 6, 2015, he elected free agency.

=== Detroit Tigers ===
On December 23, 2015, Molleken signed a minor league contract with the Detroit Tigers. After starting the season in Triple-A, on June 20, 2016, Molleken had his contract purchased and was added to the 25-man roster when journeyman Casey McGehee was designated for assignment. He was optioned back to Triple-A three days later without having appeared in a game. He was recalled, and made his MLB debut on July 4. Molleken pitched to a 4.32 ERA in 4 appearances for the Tigers in 2016. On November 9, Molleken elected free agency after being outrighted off the 40-man roster.

He signed a new minor league contract on November 18, 2016. Molleken was assigned to the Triple-A Toledo Mud Hens to begin the 2017 season. On June 28, 2017, Molleken was released by the Tigers organization.

=== Somerset Patriots ===
On July 3, 2017, Molleken signed with the Somerset Patriots of the Atlantic League of Professional Baseball. In 2017, Molleken pitched to a 3-2 record and 4.18 ERA in 26 games. He became a free agent after the 2017 season. On February 23, 2018, Molleken re-signed with the Somerset Patriots. In 2018 for Somerset, Molleken recorded a 3.90 ERA in 43 appearances.

=== Québec Capitales ===
On November 1, 2018, Molleken signed with the Québec Capitales of the Can-Am League for the 2019 season. In 2019, Molleken registered a 2.51 ERA with 7 saves in 28 games. He was released on February 18, 2020.

=== Tecolotes de los Dos Laredos ===
On February 19, 2020, Molleken signed with the Tecolotes de los Dos Laredos of the Mexican League. Molleken did not play in a game in 2020 due to the cancellation of the Mexican League season because of the COVID-19 pandemic.

== International career ==
Molleken has played for the Canada national baseball team.

In 2011, he participated in the 2011 Baseball World Cup, winning the bronze medal, and the Pan American Games, winning the gold medal.

On January 9, 2019, he was selected for the 2019 Pan American Games Qualifier, and later participated in the 2019 Pan American Games.

On October 8, 2019, he was selected for the 2019 WBSC Premier12.

== Coaching career ==
On August 29, 2020, Molleken joined the Prairie Baseball Academy's coaching staff as the new pitching coach.

== Personal life ==
Molleken is the nephew of longtime Western Hockey League coach Lorne Molleken.
