= James Gallagher (baseball) =

American baseball player (born 1985)

Jim Gallagher
- First baseman / Outfielder
- Born: September 3, 1985 (age 39); Pittsburgh, Pennsylvania, U.S.
- Bats: Left Throws: Left
Medals
Men's baseball
Representing United States
Pan American Games
Silver medal – second place	2011 Guadalajara	National team

James Andrew Gallagher (born September 3, 1985) is an American former professional baseball first baseman and outfielder. He played in minor league baseball as part of the Chicago White Sox organization. Prior to beginning his professional career, he played college baseball at Duke University. Gallagher has also competed for the United States national baseball team.

== Career ==
Gallagher attended Peters Township High School in McMurray, Pennsylvania and Duke University, where he played college baseball for the Duke Blue Devils baseball team in the Atlantic Coast Conference of the National Collegiate Athletic Association's (NCAA) Division I.

Gallagher was drafted by the Chicago White Sox in the seventh round, with the 239th overall selection, of the 2007 Major League Baseball draft. He made his professional debut with the rookie-level Great Falls Voyagers, hitting .332 with nine home runs and 44 RBI across 66 games. Gallagher spent the 2008 campaign with the Single-A Kannapolis Intimidators, playing in 123 games and hitting .267/.308/.437 with 14 home runs, 65 RBI, and 10 stolen bases.

Gallagher split the 2009 season between the High-A Winston-Salem Dash and Double-A Birmingham Barons. In 128 appearances for the two affiliates, he batted a combined .272/.359/.411 with 11 home runs and 69 RBI. Gallagher made 136 appearances for Birmingham in 2010, hitting .294/.392/.427 with 10 home runs and 53 RBI. Gallagher played in 126 games for the Triple-A Charlotte Knights during the 2011 season, slashing .246/.335/.381 with seven home runs and 54 RBI. The White Sox invited Gallagher to spring training in 2012. He split 2012 between Birmingham and Charlotte, hitting .234/.312/.316 with two home runs, 32 RBI, and six stolen bases across 93 total games.

Gallagher made 90 appearances for Charlotte during the 2013 season, batting .245/.327/.333 with three home runs, 28 RBI, and three stolen bases. He elected free agency following the season on November 4, 2013.

== International career ==
Gallagher played for the United States national baseball team in the 2011 Pan American Games, winning the silver medal.
