= Emerson Frostad =

Canadian baseball player (born 1983)

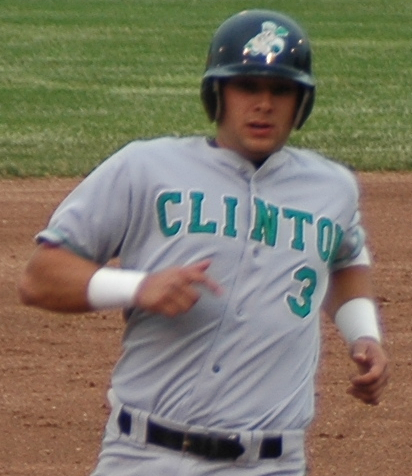
- Frostad with the Clinton LumberKings in 2005
- Catcher
- Born: January 13, 1983 (age 42); Vancouver, British Columbia, Canada
- Bats: Left Throws: Right
Medals
Men's baseball
Representing Canada
Pan American Games
Gold medal – first place	2011 Guadalajara	National team

Emerson Andrew Frostad (born January 13, 1983) is a Canadian former baseball catcher. Frostad participated in the 2008 Olympics, as a member of Canada's baseball team.
