= List of 2011 Pan American Games medalists =

The 2011 Pan American Games were held in Guadalajara, Mexico from October 14 to October 30, 2011. A total of about 6,000 athletes representing 42 National Olympic Committees participated in these Games. Overall, 361 events in 36 disciplines were contested; 188 events were open to men, 160 to women and 13 were in mixed competition. Two disciplines were open only to men: baseball and rugby sevens, while softball and Synchronized swimming were the sports in which only women were allowed to compete. Racquetball and basque pelota returned to the Pan American Games after missing the last edition of the Games and rugby sevens made its debut. New events in fencing, karate, squash, track cycling and water skiing made their debut at the Games.

== Archery ==
| Event | Gold | Silver | Bronze |
|---|---|---|---|
| Men's individual | Brady Ellison (USA) | Crispin Duenas (CAN) | Daniel Pineda (COL) |
| Women's individual | Alejandra Valencia; Mexico | Miranda Leek; United States | Aída Román; Mexico |
| Men's team | United States; Joe Fanchin; Brady Ellison; Jake Kaminski | Mexico; Juan René Serrano; Eduardo Vélez; Pedro Vivas | Cuba; Juan Stevens; Hugo Franco; Jaime Quintana |
| Women's team | Mexico; Aída Román; Alejandra Valencia; Mariana Avitia | United States; Khatuna Lorig; Miranda Leek; Heather Koehl | Cuba; Maydenia Sarduy; Orquidea Quesada; Larissa Paga |

== Athletics ==
| Event | Gold | Silver | Bronze |
|---|---|---|---|
| Men's 100 metres | Lerone Clarke; Jamaica | Kim Collins; Saint Kitts and Nevis | Emmanuel Callender; Trinidad and Tobago |
| Women's 100 metres | Rosângela Santos; Brazil | Barbara Pierre; United States | Shakera Reece; Barbados |
| Men's 200 metres | Roberto Skyers; Cuba | Lansford Spence; Jamaica | Bruno de Barros; Brazil |
| Women's 200 metres | Ana Cláudia Silva; Brazil | Simone Facey; Jamaica | Mariely Sánchez; Dominican Republic |
| Men's 400 metres | Nery Brenes; Costa Rica | Luguelín Santos; Dominican Republic | Ramon Miller; Bahamas |
| Women's 400 metres | Jennifer Padilla; Colombia | Daisurami Bonne; Cuba | Geisa Coutinho; Brazil |
| Men's 800 metres | Andy González; Cuba | Kléberson Davide; Brazil | Raidel Acea; Cuba |
| Women's 800 metres | Adriana Muñoz; Cuba | Gabriela Medina; Mexico | Rosibel García; Colombia |
| Men's 1500 metres | Leandro de Oliveira; Brazil | Byron Piedra; Ecuador | Eduar Villanueva; Venezuela |
| Women's 1500 metres | Adriana Muñoz; Cuba | Rosibel García; Colombia | Malindi Elmore; Canada |
| Men's 5,000 metres | Juan Luis Barrios; Mexico | Byron Piedra; Ecuador | Joilson da Silva; Brazil |
| Women's 5,000 metres | Marisol Romero; Mexico | Cruz da Silva; Brazil | Inés Melchor; Peru |
| Men's 10,000 metres | Marílson Gomes dos Santos; Brazil | Juan Carlos Romero; Mexico | Giovani dos Santos; Brazil |
| Women's 10,000 metres | Marisol Romero; Mexico | Cruz da Silva; Brazil | Yolanda Caballero; Colombia |
| Men's 110 metres hurdles | Dayron Robles; Cuba | Paulo Villar; Colombia | Orlando Ortega; Cuba |
| Women's 100 metres hurdles | Yvette Lewis; United States | Angela Whyte; Canada | Lina Flórez; Colombia |
| Men's 400 metres hurdles | Omar Cisneros; Cuba | Isa Phillips; Jamaica | Félix Sánchez; Dominican Republic |
| Women's 400 metres hurdles | Princesa Oliveros; Colombia | Lucy Jaramillo; Ecuador | Yolanda Osana; Dominican Republic |
| Men's 3000 metres steeplechase | José Peña; Venezuela | Hudson de Souza; Brazil | José Alberto Sánchez; Cuba |
| Women's 3000 metres steeplechase | Sara Hall; United States | Ángela Figueroa; Colombia | Sabine Heitling; Brazil |
| Men's 4 × 100 metres relay | Brazil; Ailson Feitosa; Sandro Viana; Nilson André; Bruno de Barros | Saint Kitts and Nevis; Jason Rogers; Antoine Adams; Delwayne Delaney; Brijesh Lawrence | United States; Calesio Newman; Jeremy Dodson; Rubin Williams; Monzavous Edwards |
| Women's 4 × 100 metres relay | Brazil; Ana Cláudia Silva; Vanda Gomes; Franciela Krasucki; Rosângela Santos | United States; Kenyanna Wilson; Barbara Pierre; Yvette Lewis; Chastity Riggien | Colombia; Lina Flórez; Jennifer Padilla; Yomara Hinestroza; Norma González |
| Men's 4 × 400 metres relay | Cuba; Noel Ruíz; Yoandri Betanzos; Omar Cisneros; William Collazo | Dominican Republic; Arismendy Peguero; Luguelín Santos; Yoel Tapia; Gustavo Cuesta | Venezuela; Arturo Ramírez lberto Aguilar; José Acevedo; Omar Longart |
| Women's 4 × 400 metres relay | Cuba; Aymée Martínez; Diosmely Peña; Susana Clement; Daisurami Bonne | Brazil; Joelma Sousa; Geisa Coutinho; Bárbara de Oliveira; Jailma de Lima | Colombia; Princesa Oliveros; Norma González; Evelis Aguilar; Jennifer Padilla |
| Men's Marathon | Solonei da Silva; Brazil | Diego Colorado; Colombia | Juan Carlos Cardona; Colombia |
| Women's Marathon | Adriana Aparecida da Silva; Brazil | Madaí Pérez; Mexico | Gladys Tejeda; Peru |
| Men's 20 kilometres walk | Erick Barrondo; Guatemala | James Rendón; Colombia | Luis Fernando López; Colombia |
| Women's 20 kilometres walk | Jamy Franco; Guatemala | Mirna Ortiz; Guatemala | Ingrid Hernández; Colombia |
| Men's 50 kilometres walk | Horacio Nava; Mexico | José Leyver; Mexico | Jaime Quiyuch; Guatemala |
| Men's High jump | Donald Thomas; Bahamas | Diego Ferrin; Ecuador | Víctor Moya; Cuba |
| Women's High jump | Lesyani Mayor; Cuba | Marielys Rojas; Venezuela | Romary Rifka; Mexico |
| Men's Pole vault | Lázaro Borges; Cuba | Jeremy Scott; United States | Giovanni Lanaro; Mexico |
| Women's Pole vault | Yarisley Silva; Cuba | Fabiana Murer; Brazil | Becky Holliday; United States |
| Men's Long jump | Daniel Pineda; Chile | David Registe^{[A]} Dominica | Jeremy Hicks^{[A]} United States |
| Women's Long jump | Maurren Maggi; Brazil | Shameka Marshall; United States | Caterine Ibargüen; Colombia |
| Men's Triple jump | Alexis Copello; Cuba | Yoandri Betanzos; Cuba | Jefferson Sabino; Brazil |
| Women's Triple jump | Caterine Ibargüen; Colombia | Yargelis Savigne; Cuba | Mabel Gay; Cuba |
| Men's Shot put | Dylan Armstrong; Canada | Carlos Véliz; Cuba | Germán Lauro; Argentina |
| Women's Shot put | Misleydis González; Cuba | Cleopatra Borel-Brown; Trinidad and Tobago | Michelle Carter; United States |
| Men's Discus throw | Jorge Fernández; Cuba | Jarred Rome; United States | Ronald Julião; Brazil |
| Women's Discus throw | Yarelys Barrios; Cuba | Aretha Thurmond; United States | Denia Caballero; Cuba |
| Men's Hammer throw | Kibwe Johnson; United States | Michael Mai; United States | Noleysis Vicet; Cuba |
| Women's Hammer throw | Yipsi Moreno; Cuba | Sultana Frizell; Canada | Amber Campbell; United States |
| Men's Javelin throw | Guillermo Martínez; Cuba | Cyrus Hostetler; United States | Braian Toledo; Argentina |
| Women's Javelin throw | Alicia DeShasier; United States | Yainelis Ribeaux; Cuba | Yanet Cruz; Cuba |
| Men's Decathlon | Leonel Suárez; Cuba | Maurice Smith; Jamaica | Yordani Garcia; Cuba |
| Women's Heptathlon | Lucimara da Silva; Brazil | Yasmiany Pedroso; Cuba | Francia Manzanillo; Dominican Republic |

== Badminton ==
| Event | Gold | Silver | Bronze |
|---|---|---|---|
| Men's singles | Kevin Cordón; Guatemala | Osleni Guerrero; Cuba | Charles Pyne; Jamaica |
| Men's singles | Kevin Cordón; Guatemala | Osleni Guerrero; Cuba | Daniel Paiola; Brazil |
| Women's singles | Michelle Li; Canada | Joycelyn Ko; Canada | Victoria Montero; Mexico |
| Women's singles | Michelle Li; Canada | Joycelyn Ko; Canada | Claudia Rivero; Peru |
| Men's doubles | United States; Tony Gunawan; Howard Bach | United States; Halim Ho; Sattawat Pongnairat | Mexico; Andrés López; Lino Muñoz |
| Men's doubles | United States; Tony Gunawan; Howard Bach | United States; Halim Ho; Sattawat Pongnairat | Canada; Adrian Liu; Derrick Ng |
| Women's doubles | Canada; Alex Bruce; Michelle Li | United States; Rena Wang; Iris Wang | Canada; Grace Gao; Joycelyn Ko |
| Women's doubles | Canada; Alex Bruce; Michelle Li | United States; Rena Wang; Iris Wang | United States; Eva Lee; Paula Lynn Obañana |
| Mixed doubles | Canada; Grace Gao; Toby Ng | United States; Halim Ho; Eva Lee | Peru; Claudia Rivero; Rodrigo Pacheco |
| Mixed doubles | Canada; Grace Gao; Toby Ng | United States; Halim Ho; Eva Lee | United States; Howard Bach; Paula Lynn Obañana |

== Baseball ==
| Event | Gold | Silver | Bronze |
|---|---|---|---|
| Men's | Canada; Andrew Albers; Cole Armstrong; Chris Bisson; Shawn Bowman; Nick Bucci; Michael Crouse; Emerson Frostad; Mark Hardy; Jimmy Henderson; Shawn Hill; Jay Johnson; Mike Johnson; Chris Kissock; Brock Kjeldgaard; Marcus Knecht; Kyle Lotzkar; Jonathan Malo; Dustin Molleken; Scott Richmond; Chris Robinson; Jamie Romak; Tim Smith; Skyler Stromsmoe; Jimmy Van Ostrand | United States; Pete Andrelczyk; Jeff Beliveau; Brett Carroll; Justin Cassel; Matt Clark; Jordan Danks; Chuckie Fick; Jim Gallagher; Andrew Garcia; Tuffy Gosewisch; Brett Jackson; Jeff Marquez; James McCann; Tommy Mendonca; Jordy Mercer; Scott Patterson; A. J. Pollock; Todd Redmond; Matt Shoemaker; Drew Smyly; Joe Thurston; Chad Tracy; Andy Van Hekken; Randy Williams | Cuba; José Abreu; Yosvany Alarcón; Freddy Alvarez; Bárbaro Arruebarruena; Alexeis Bell; Rusney Castillo; Frederich Cepeda; Alfredo Despaigne; Giorbis Duvergel; Michel Enrique; Miguel González; Norberto González; Yulieski González; Yulieski Gurriel; Dalier Hinojosa; Miguel Lahera; Jonder Martínez; Frank Morejón; Vicyohandrys Odelin; Héctor Olivera; Yadier Pedroso; Ariel Pestano; Rudith Reyes; Alberto Soto |

== Basketball ==
| Event | Gold | Silver | Bronze |
|---|---|---|---|
| Men | Puerto Rico; José Juan Barea; Carlos Arroyo; Filiberto Rivera; Carlos Strong; Samuel Villegas; Miguel "Ali" Berdiel; Edwin Ubiles; Gabriel Colón; Luis Villafañe; Manuel Narvaez; Daniel Santiago; Renaldo Balkman | Mexico; Paul Stoll; Jovan Harris; Pedro Meza; Christopher Hernandez; Adam Parada; Michael Strobbe; Victor Mariscal; Omar Quintero; Héctor Hernández; Orlando Méndez; Lorenzo Real; Jesús López | United States; Blake Ahearn; Brian Butch; Justin Dentmon; Jerome Dyson; Moses Ehambe; Marcus Lewis; Leo Lyons; Renaldo Makor; Donald Sloan; Gregory Stiemsma; Curtis Sumpter; Lance Thomas |
| Women | Puerto Rico; Angelica Bermudez; Carla Cortijo; Carla Escalera; Michelle Gonzalez; Yolanda Jones; Angiely Morales; Michelle Pacheco; Mari Placido; Pamela Rosado; Jazmine Sepulveda; Cynthia Valentin; Esmary Vargas | Mexico; Marie Bibbs; Alexis Castro; Azucena Loudres; Abril Garcia; Monica Garcia; Sofia Garica; Erika Gomez; Fernanda Guitierrez; Laura Nuñez; Maylene Ornelas; Sonia Ortega; Brisa Silva | Brazil; Tassia Carcavalli; Damiris Dantas; Izabela De Andrade; Barbara De Queiroz; Carina De Souza; Érika de Souza; Clarissa Dos Santos; Gilmara Justino; Palmira Marcal; Iziane Marques; Jaqueline Silvestre; Silvia Valente |

== Basque pelota ==
| Event | Gold | Silver | Bronze |
|---|---|---|---|
| Men's Paleta Rubber Pairs Trinkete | Argentina; Facundo Andreasen; Sergio Villegas | Uruguay; Enzo Cazzola; Carlos Buzzo | Mexico; Adrian Raya; Guillermo Verdeja |
| Women's Paleta Rubber Pairs Trinkete | Argentina; María Lis García; Verónica Andrea Stele | Uruguay; Maria Jimena Miranda; Camila Naviliat | Mexico; Ariana Yolanda Cepeda; Rocio Guillen |
| Men's Paleta Leather Pairs Trinkete | Argentina; Cristian Andrés Algarbe; Jorge Villegas | Uruguay; Pablo Baldizan; Gaston Dufau | Cuba; Frendy Fernandez; Anderson Jardines |
| Men'sMano Singles Trinkete | Heriberto López; Mexico | Darien Povea; Cuba | Roger Etchevers; United States |
| Men's Paleta Leather Pairs 36m Fronton | Cuba; Rafael Fernández; Azuan Perez | Mexico; Rodrigo Ledesma; Francisco Javier Mendiburu | Argentina; Luciano Callarelli; Carlos Dorato |
| Men's Mano Singles 36m Fronton | Fernando Medina; Mexico | Roberto Huarte; United States | Henrry Despaigne; Cuba |
| Men's Mano Doubles 36m Fronton | Mexico; Jorge Alberto Alcantara; Orlando Diaz | United States; Jose Huarte; Tony Huarte | Cuba; Dariel Leiva; Ruben Moya |
| Men's Paleta Rubber Pairs 30m Fronton | Argentina; Fernando Gabriel Ergueta; Javier Alejandro Nicosia | Mexico; Jesus Homero Hurtado; Daniel Salvador Rodriguez | Cuba; Jose Noel Fiffe; Jhoan Luis Torreblanca |
| Men's Frontenis Pairs 30m Fronton | Mexico; Alberto Miguel Rodriguez; Arturo Rodríguez | Cuba; Daniel Alonso; Cesar Rafael Arocha | Argentina; Jorge Maximiliano Alberdi; Alexis Emanuel Clementín |
| Women's Frontenis Pairs 30m Fronton< r> | Mexico; Paulina Castillo; Guadalupe Maria Hernandez | Cuba; Lisandra Lima; Yasmary De La Caridad Medina | Argentina; Irina Podversich; Johanna Stefanía Zair |

== Beach volleyball ==
| Event | Gold | Silver | Bronze |
|---|---|---|---|
| Men's | Alison Cerutti and Emanuel Rego; Brazil | Igor Hernández and Farid Mussa; Venezuela | Santiago Etchgaray and Pablo Suarez; Argentina |
| Women's | Larissa França and Juliana Felisberta; Brazil | Bibiana Candelas and Mayra García; Mexico | Yarleen Santiago and Yamileska Yantin; Puerto Rico |

== Bowling ==
| Event | Gold | Silver | Bronze |
|---|---|---|---|
| Men's individual | Santiago Mejía; Colombia | Chris Barnes; United States | Marcelo Suartz; Brazil |
| Men's individual | Santiago Mejía; Colombia | Chris Barnes; United States | Manuel Fernández; Dominican Republic |
| Women's individual | Elizabeth Johnson; United States | Jennifer Park; Canada | Caroline Lagrange; Canada |
| Women's individual | Elizabeth Johnson; United States | Jennifer Park; Canada | Karen Marcano; Venezuela |
| Men's pairs | United States; William O'Neil; Chris Barnes | Venezuela; José Lander; Amleto Monacelli | Colombia; Santiago Mejía; Andrés Gómez |
| Women's pairs | United States; Elizabeth Johnson; Kelly Kulick | Mexico; Sandra Góngora; Miriam Zetter | Colombia; Anggie Ramírez; María Rodríguez |

== Boxing ==
| Event | Gold | Silver | Bronze |
|---|---|---|---|
| Men's light flyweight | Joselito Velázquez; Mexico | Yosbany Veitia; Cuba | Jantony Ortiz; Puerto Rico |
| Men's light flyweight | Joselito Velázquez; Mexico | Yosbany Veitia; Cuba | Juan Medina; Dominican Republic |
| Men's flyweight | Robeisy Ramírez; Cuba | Dagoberto Aguero; Dominican Republic | Braulio Ávila; Mexico |
| Men's flyweight | Robeisy Ramírez; Cuba | Dagoberto Aguero; Dominican Republic | Julião Henriques Neto; Brazil |
| Women's flyweight | Mandy Bujold; Canada | Ingrit Valencia; Colombia | Pamela Benavidez; Argentina |
| Women's flyweight | Mandy Bujold; Canada | Ingrit Valencia; Colombia | Karlha Magliocco; Venezuela |
| Men's bantamweight | Lázaro Álvarez; Cuba | Óscar Valdez; Mexico | Ángel Rodríguez; Venezuela |
| Men's bantamweight | Lázaro Álvarez; Cuba | Óscar Valdez; Mexico | Robenilson De Jesus; Brazil |
| Men's lightweight | Yasniel Toledo; Cuba | Robson Da Conceicao; Brazil | Angel Suarez; Puerto Rico |
| Men's lightweight | Yasniel Toledo; Cuba | Robson Da Conceicao; Brazil | Angel Gutierrez; Mexico |
| Men's light welterweight | Roniel Iglesias; Cuba | Valentino Knowles; Bahamas | Joelvis Hernandes; Venezuela |
| Men's light welterweight | Roniel Iglesias; Cuba | Valentino Knowles; Bahamas | Éverton Lopes; Brazil |
| Women's light welterweight | Kiria Tapia; Puerto Rico | Erika Cruz; Mexico | Sandra Bizier; Canada |
| Women's light welterweight | Kiria Tapia; Puerto Rico | Erika Cruz; Mexico | Adela Peralta; Argentina |
| Men's welterweight | Carlos Banteux; Cuba | Óscar Molina; Mexico | Mian Hussain; Canada |
| Men's welterweight | Carlos Banteux; Cuba | Óscar Molina; Mexico | Myke Carvalho; Brazil |
| Men's middleweight | Emilio Correa; Cuba | Jaime Cortez; Ecuador | Juan Carlos Rodríguez; Venezuela |
| Men's middleweight | Emilio Correa; Cuba | Jaime Cortez; Ecuador | Brody Blair; Canada |
| Men's light heavyweight | Julio La Cruz; Cuba | Yamaguchi Florentino; Brazil | Carlos Góngora; Ecuador |
| Men's light heavyweight | Julio La Cruz; Cuba | Yamaguchi Florentino; Brazil | Armando Pina; Mexico |
| Women's light heavyweight | Mary Spencer; Canada | Yenebier Guillén; Dominican Republic | Roseli Feitosa; Brazil |
| Women's light heavyweight | Mary Spencer; Canada | Yenebier Guillén; Dominican Republic | Alma Ibarra; Mexico |
| Men's heavyweight | Lenier Pero; Cuba | Julio Castillo; Ecuador | Yamil Peralta; Argentina |
| Men's heavyweight | Lenier Pero; Cuba | Julio Castillo; Ecuador | Anderson Emmanuel; Barbados |
| Men's super heavyweight | Ytalo Perea; Ecuador | Juan Hiracheta; Mexico | Isaia Mena; Colombia |
| Men's super heavyweight | Ytalo Perea; Ecuador | Juan Hiracheta; Mexico | Gerado Bisbal; Puerto Rico |

== Canoeing ==
| Event | Gold | Silver | Bronze |
|---|---|---|---|
| Men's C-1 200 metres | Richard Dalton; Canada | Nivalter De Jesus; Brazil | Roleysi Baez; Cuba |
| Men's C-1 1000 metres | Everardo Cristóbal; Mexico | Reydel Ramos; Cuba | Johnnathan Tafra; Chile |
| Men's C-2 1000 metres | Cuba; Karel Aguilar Chacón; Serguey Torres | Brazil; Erlon Silva; Ronilson Oliveira | Venezuela; Ronny Ratia; Anderson Ramos |
| Men's K-1 200 metres | César de Cesare; Ecuador | Miguel Correa; Argentina | Ryan Dolan; United States |
| Women's K-1 200 metres | Carrie Johnson; United States | Darisleydis Amador; Cuba | Sabrina Ameghino; Argentina |
| Men's K-1 1000 metres | Jorge Antonio Garcia; Cuba | Daniel Dal Bo; Argentina | Philippe Duchesneau; Canada |
| Women's K-1 500 metres | Carrie Johnson; United States | Émilie Fournel; Canada | Alexandra Keresztesi; Argentina |
| Men's K-2 200 metres | Canada; Ryan Cochrane; Hugues Fournel | Argentina; Miguel Correa; Ruben Voizard | Brazil; Givago Ribeiro; Gilvan Ribeiro |
| Women's K-2 500 metres | Cuba; Dayexi Gandarela; Dayexi Gandarela | Argentina; Sabrina Ameghino; Alexandra Keresztesi | United States; Margaret Hogan; Kaitlyn McElroy |
| Men's K-2 1000 metres | Canada; Steven Joren; Richard Dessureault-Dober | Cuba; Reinier Torres; Jorge Antonio Garcia | Argentina; Pablo Martín de Torres; Roberto Geringer Sallette |
| Women's K-4 500 metres | Canada; Kathleen Fraser; Kristin Gauthier; Alexa Irvin; Una Lounder | Mexico; Anais Abraham; Karina Alanís; Alicia Guluarte; Maricela Montemayor | Cuba; Darisleydis Amador; Yulitza Meneses; Dayexi Gandarela; Yusmari Mengana |
| Men's K-4 1000 metres | Cuba; Osvaldo Labrada; Jorge Antonio Garcia; Reinier Torres; Maikel Daniel Zulueta | Canada; Richard Dessureault-Dober; Philippe Duchesneau; Steven Jorens; Connor Taras | Brazil; Celso Oliveira; Roberto Maheler; Gilvan Ribeiro; Givago Ribeiro |

== Cycling ==
=== Road ===
| Event | Gold | Silver | Bronze |
|---|---|---|---|
| Men's road race | Marc de Maar; Netherlands Antilles | Miguel Uberto; Venezuela | Arnold Alcolea; Cuba |
| Women's road race | Arlenis Sierra; Cuba | Yumari González; Cuba | Yudelmis Domínguez; Cuba |
| Men's time trial | Marlon Pérez Arango; Colombia | Matías Médici; Argentina | Carlos Oyarzun; Chile |
| Women's time trial | María Luisa Calle; Colombia | Evelyn García; El Salvador | Laura Brown; Canada |

=== Track ===
| Event | Gold | Silver | Bronze |
|---|---|---|---|
| Men's team pursuit | Colombia; Juan Esteban Arango; Edwin Ávila; Arles Castro; Weimar Roldán | Chile; Antonio Cabrera; Gonzalo Miranda; Pablo Seisdedos; Luis Sepúlveda | Argentina; Maximiliano Almada; Marcos Crespo; Walter Pérez; Eduardo Sepúlveda |
| Women's team pursuit | Canada; Laura Brown; Jasmin Glaesser; Stephanie Roorda | Cuba; Yumari González; Dalila Rodríguez; Yudelmis Domínguez | Colombia; María Luisa Calle; Sérika Gulumá; Lorena Vargas |
| Men's individual sprint | Hersony Canelón; Venezuela | Fabián Puerta; Colombia | Njisane Phillip; Trinidad and Tobago |
| Women's individual sprint | Lisandra Guerra; Cuba | Daniela Larreal; Venezuela | Diana García; Colombia |
| Men's team sprint | Venezuela; Hersony Canelón; César Marcano; Ángel Pulgar | United States; Michael Blatchford; Dean Tracy; James Watkins | Colombia; Jonathan Marín; Fabián Puerta; Christian Tamayo |
| Women's team sprint | Venezuela; Daniela Larreal; Mariestela Vilera | Colombia; Diana García; Juliana Gaviria | Mexico; Nancy Contreras; Luz Gaxiola |
| Men's Keirin | Fabián Puerta; Colombia | Hersony Canelón; Venezuela | Leandro Bottasso; Argentina |
| Women's Keirin | Daniela Larreal; Venezuela | Luz Gaxiola; Mexico | Dana Feiss; United States |
| Men's Omnium | Juan Esteban Arango; Colombia | Luis Mansilla; Chile | Walter Pérez; Argentina |
| Women's Omnium | Angie González; Venezuela | Sofía Arreola; Mexico | Marlies Mejías; Cuba |

=== Mountain biking ===
| Event | Gold | Silver | Bronze |
|---|---|---|---|
| Men's cross-country | Héctor Leonardo Páez; Colombia | Max Platon; Canada | Jeremiah Bishop; United States |
| Women's cross-country | Heather Irmiger; United States | Laura Morfin; Mexico | Amanda Sin; Canada |

=== BMX ===
| Event | Gold | Silver | Bronze |
|---|---|---|---|
| Men | Connor Fields; United States | Nicholas Long; United States | Andrés Jiménez; Colombia |
| Women | Mariana Pajón; Colombia | Arielle Martin; United States | Gabriela Díaz; Argentina |

== Diving ==
| Event | Gold | Silver | Bronze |
|---|---|---|---|
| Men's 3 metre springboard | Yahel Castillo; Mexico | Julián Sánchez; Mexico | César Castro; Brazil |
| Women's 3 metre springboard | Laura Sánchez; Mexico | Cassidy Krug; United States | Paola Espinosa; Mexico |
| Men's 10 metre platform | Iván García; Mexico | Rommel Pacheco; Mexico | Sebastián Villa; Colombia |
| Women's 10 metre platform | Paola Espinosa; Mexico | Tatiana Ortiz; Mexico | Meaghan Benfeito; Canada |
| Men's synchronized 3 metre springboard | Mexico; Yahel Castillo; Julián Sánchez | United States; Troy Dumais; Kristian Ipsen | Cuba; Rene Hernandez; Jorge Pupo |
| Women's synchronized 3 metre springboard | Mexico; Paola Espinosa; Laura Sánchez | Canada; Jennifer Abel; Émilie Heymans | United States; Kassidy Cook; Cassidy Crug |
| Men's synchronized 10 metre platform | Mexico; Iván García; Germán Sánchez | Cuba; Jeinkler Aguerro; José Guerra | Canada; Kevin Geyson; Eric Sehn |
| Women's synchronized 10 metre platform | Mexico; Paola Espinosa; Tatiana Ortiz | Canada; Meaghan Benfeito; Roseline Filion | Cuba; Yaima Mena; Annia Rivera |

== Equestrian ==
| Event | Gold | Silver | Bronze |
|---|---|---|---|
| Individual dressage | Steffen Peters on Weltino's Magic; United States | Heather Anderson Blitz on Paragon; United States | Marisa Festerling on Big Tyme; United States |
| Team dressage | United States; Steffen Peters on Weltino's Magic; Heather Anderson Blitz on Paragon; Cesar Alberto Parra on Grandioso; Marisa Festerling on Big Tyme | Canada; Thomas Dvorak on Viva's Salieri W Crystal Kroetch on Lymrix; Tina Irwin on Winston; Roberta Byng-Morris on Reiki Tyme | Colombia; Marco Bernal on Farewell; Constanza Jaramillo on Wakana; Juan Mauricio on First Fisherman; María Inés García on Beckam |
| Individual jumping | Christine McCrea on Romantovich Take One; United States | Beezie Madden on Coral Reef Via Volo; United States | Bernardo Alves on Bridgit; Brazil |
| Team jumping | United States; Kent Farrington on Uceko; Beezie Madden on Coral Reef Via Volo; Christine McCrea on Romantovich Take One; McLain Ward on Antares F | Brazil; Álvaro de Miranda Neto on AD Norson; Bernardo Alves on Bridgit; Karina Johannpeter on SRF dragonfly de Joter; Rodrigo Pessoa on HH Ashley | Mexico; Antonio Maurer on Callao; Alberto Michán on Rosalía la Silla; Enrique González on Criptonite; Daniel Michan on Ragna T |
| Individual eventing | Jessica Phoenix on Pavarotti; Canada | Hannah Burnett on Harbour Pilot; United States | Bruce Davidson Jr. on Absolute Liberty; United States |
| Team eventing | United States; Lynn Symansky on Donner; Hannah Burnett on Harbour Pilot; Jack Pollard on Schoensgreen Hanni; Bruce Davidson Jr. on Absolute Liberty; Hannah Burnett on Harbour Pilot | Canada; Selena O'Hanlon on Foxwood High; Rebecca Howard on Roquefort; Jessica Phoenix on Pavarotti; Hawley Bennett on Five O'clock Somewhere; James Atkinson on Gustav | Brazil; Jesper Martendal on Laid Jimmy; Marcelo Tosi on Eleda All Black; Marcio Jorge on Josephine MCJ; Ruy Fonseca Filho on Tom Bombadill Too; Serguei Fofanoff on Barabara TW |

== Fencing ==
| Event | Gold | Silver | Bronze |
|---|---|---|---|
| Men's individual épée | Weston Kelsey; United States | Rubén Limardo; Venezuela | Silvio Fernández; Venezuela |
| Men's individual épée | Weston Kelsey; United States | Rubén Limardo; Venezuela | Reynier Henriquez; Cuba |
| Women's individual épée | Kelley Hurley; United States | Courtney Hurley; United States | Elida Aguero; Argentina |
| Women's individual épée | Kelley Hurley; United States | Courtney Hurley; United States | Yamirka Rodriguez; Cuba |
| Men's team épée | United States; Soren Thompson; Weston Kelsey; Cody Mattern; Gerek Meinhardt | Venezuela; Silvio Fernández; Francisco Limardo; Rubén Limardo; Jhon Perez | Canada; Tigran Bajgoric; Igor Gantsevich; Vincent Pelletier; Étienne Turbide |
| Women's team épée | United States; Lindsay Campbell; Courtney Hurley; Kelley Hurley | Canada; Sherraine Schalm; Ainsley Switzer; Sandra Sassine; Daria Jorqera | Mexico; Alexandra Avena; Andrea Millan; Alejandra Terán; Alely Hernandez |
| Men's individual foil | Alexander Massialas; United States | Felipe Alvear; Chile | Antonio Leal; Venezuela |
| Men's individual foil | Alexander Massialas; United States | Felipe Alvear; Chile | Guilherme Toldo; Brazil |
| Women's individual foil | Lee Kiefer; United States | Nzingha Prescod; United States | Monica Peterson; Canada |
| Women's individual foil | Lee Kiefer; United States | Nzingha Prescod; United States | Nataly Michel; Mexico |
| Men's team foil | United States; Miles Chamley-Watson; Alexander Massialas; Gerek Meinhardt | Canada; Étienne Turbide; Anthony Prymack; Nicolas Teisseire; Tigran Bajgoric | Brazil; Fernando Scavasin; Heitor Shimbo; Guilherme Toldo; Renzo Agresta |
| Women's team foil | United States; Lee Kiefer; Nzingha Prescod; Doris Willette; Ibtihaj Muhammad | Canada; Alanna Goldie; Monica Peterson; Kelleigh Ryan; Sandra Sassine | Venezuela; Mariana González; Johana Fuenmayor; Yulitza Suarez; Maria Martinez |
| Men's individual sabre | Philippe Beaudry; Canada | Timothy Morehouse; United States | Hernán Jansen; Venezuela |
| Men's individual sabre | Philippe Beaudry; Canada | Timothy Morehouse; United States | Joseph Polossifakis; Canada |
| Women's individual sabre | Mariel Zagunis; United States | Alejandra Benítez; Venezuela | Eileen Grench; Panama |
| Women's individual sabre | Mariel Zagunis; United States | Alejandra Benítez; Venezuela | Yaritza Goulet; Cuba |
| Men's team sabre | United States; Benjamin Igoe; Timothy Morehouse; James Williams | Canada; Joseph Polossifakis; Philippe Beaudry; Vincent Couturier; Anthony Prymack | Brazil; Renzo Agresta; William De Moraes; Tywilliam Pacheco; Heitor Shimbo |
| Women's team sabre | United States; Ibtihaj Muhammad; Mariel Zagunis; Dagmara Wozniak | Mexico; Úrsula González; Angelica Aguilar; Angélica Larios | Venezuela; Alejandra Benítez; Yulitza Suarez; Maria Blanco |

== Field hockey ==
| Event | Gold | Silver | Bronze |
|---|---|---|---|
| Men's tournament | Argentina; Juan Manuel Vivaldi; Ignacio Bergner; Matías Vila; Pedro Ibarra; Lucas Argento; Lucas Rey; Rodrigo Vila; Matías Paredes; Lucas Cammareri; Lucas Vila; Fernando Zylberberg; Juan Martín López; Manuel Brunet; Federico Bermejillo; Agustín Mazzilli; Lucas Rossi | Canada; Philip Wright; Scott Tupper; Jesse Watson; Richard Hildreth; Ken Pereira; Keegan Pereira; Jagdish Gill; David Jameson; Rob Short; Adam Froese; Mark Pearson; Iain Smythe; Gabbar Singh; Matthew Guests; David Carter; Antoni Kindler | Chile; Mathias Anwandter; Andrés Fuenzalida; Jose Zirpel; Adrián Henríquez; Jaime Zarhi; Esteban Krainz; Juan Cristóbal Rodríguez; Thomas Kannegiesser; Martin Hernan Rodriguez; Alexis Berczely; Sebastián Kapsch; Fernando Fernández; Fernando Binder; Raúl Garcés; Jan Christian Richter; Sven Richter |
| Women's tournament | United States; Kayla Bashore-Smedley; Michelle Cesan; Lauren Crandall; Rachel Dawson; Katelyn Falgowski; Melissa Gonzalez; Michelle Kasold; Claire Laubach; Caroline Nichols; Katie O'Donnell; Julia Reinprecht; Katie Reinprecht; Paige Selenski; Amy Swensen; Shannon Taylor; Michelle Vittese | Argentina; María Laura Aladro; Luciana Aymar; Noel Barrionuevo; María Silvina D'Elía; Soledad García; Rosario Luchetti; Sofía Maccari; Delfina Merino; Carla Rebecchi; Macarena Rodríguez; Rocío Sánchez Moccia; Mariela Scarone; Daniela Sruoga; María Josefina Sruoga; Belén Succi; Victoria Zuloaga | Chile; Claudia Schuler; Sofia Walbaum; Javiera Villagra; Paula Infante; Daniela Infante; Carloina Garcia; Maria Fernandez; Camila Caram; Manuela Urroz; Daniela Carram; Denise Infante; Michelle Wilson; Christine Fingerhuth; Catalina Cabach; Catalina Thiermann; Josefina Khamis |

== Football ==
| Event | Gold | Silver | Bronze |
|---|---|---|---|
| Men's tournament | Mexico; José de Jesús Corona; Hugo Isaác Rodríguez; Hiram Mier; Néstor Araujo; Dárvin Chávez; Jesús Zavala; Javier Aquino; Carlos Emilio Orrantía; Oribe Peralta; Othoniel Arce; Jerónimo Amione; José Antonio Rodríguez; Ricardo Bocanegra; Jorge Enríquez; César Ibáñez; Miguel Ángel Ponce; Isaác Brizuela; Diego Reyes | Argentina; Esteban Andrada; Germán Pezzella; Lucas Kruspzky; Hugo Nervo; Ezequiel Cirigliano; Leandro González Pírez; Matías Laba; Leonardo Ferreyra; Carlos Luque; Michael Hoyos; Sergio Araujo; Rodrigo Rey; David Achucarro; Franco Fragapane; Lucas Villafáñez; Adrián Martínez; Fernando Coniglio; Alan Ruiz | Uruguay; Matías Cubero; Guillermo de los Santos; Gastón Silva; Adrián Gunino; Facundo Píriz; Mauricio Prieto; Leonardo Pais; Gonzalo Papa; Federico Puppo; Tabaré Viudez; Maxi Rodríguez; Martín Rodríguez; Santiago Silva; Emiliano Albín; Diego Rodríguez; Mathias Abero; Gianni Rodríguez; Matías Britos |
| Women's tournament | Canada; Rachelle Beanlands; Melanie Booth; Candace Chapman; Robyn Gayle; Christina Julien; Kaylyn Kyle; Karina LeBlanc; Vanessa Legault-Cordisco; Diana Matheson; Kelly Parker; Sophie Schmidt; Desiree Scott; Lauren Sesselmann; Diamond Simpson; Christine Sinclair; Brittany Timko; Rhian Wilkinson; Shannon Woeller | Brazil; Francielle Alberto; Rosana Augusto; Barbara Barbosa; Daniele Batista; Renata Costa; Debora De Oliveira; Maurine Goncalves; Thais Guedes; Beatriz Joao; Miraildes Mota; Grazielle Nascimento; Tania Pereira; Thais Picarte; Karen Rocha; Daiane Rodrigues; Andreia Santos; Renata Santos; Ketlen Wiggers | Mexico; Aurora Santiago; Erika Venegas; Kenti Robles; Rubí Sandoval; Jennifer Ruiz; Valeria Miranda; Mónica Vergara; Marylin Díaz; Luz del Rosario Saucedo; Stephany Mayor; Guadalupe Worbis; Dinora Garza; Liliana Mercado; Liliana Godoy; Verónica Pérez; Maribel Domínguez; Mónica Ocampo; Tanya Samarzich |

== Gymnastics ==
=== Artistic ===
| Event | Gold | Silver | Bronze |
|---|---|---|---|
| Men's individual all-around | Jossimar Calvo; Colombia | Jorge Hugo Giraldo; Colombia | Tomás González; Chile |
| Women's individual all-around | Bridgette Caquatto; United States | Ana Sofía Gómez; Guatemala | Kristina Vaculik; Canada |
| Men's team all-around | Brazil; Francisco Barretto; Petrix Barbosa; Pericles Da Silva; Diego Hypólito; Arthur Zanetti; Sergio Sasaki Jr. | Puerto Rico; Rafael Morales; Angel Ramos; Tommy Ramos; Luis Rivera; Alexander Rodríguez; Luis Vargas | United States; Donothan Bailey; Christopher Maestas; Tyler Mizoguchi; Sho Nakamori; Paul Ruggeri; Brandon Wynn |
| Women's team all-around | United States; Bridgette Caquatto; Jessie DeZiel; Brandie Jay; Shawn Johnson; Grace McLaughlin; Bridget Sloan | Canada; Kristina Vaculik; Peng-Peng Lee; Coralie Leblond-Chartrand; Mikaela Gerber; Dominique Pegg; Talia Chiarelli | Mexico; Elsa García; Marisela Cantú; Ana Lago; Karla Salazar; Yessenia Estrada; Alexa Moreno |
| Women's balance beam | Ana Sofía Gómez; Guatemala | Kristina Vaculik; Canada | Daniele Hypólito; Brazil |
| Men's floor | Diego Hypólito; Brazil | Tomás González; Chile | Alexander Rodríguez; Puerto Rico |
| Women's floor | Ana Lago; Mexico | Mikaela Gerber; Canada | Daniele Hypólito; Brazil |
| Men's horizontal bar | Paul Ruggeri; United States | Jossimar Calvo; Colombia | Angel Ramos; Puerto Rico |
| Men's parallel bars | Daniel Corral; Mexico | Jorge Hugo Giraldo; Colombia | None awarded |
| Men's parallel bars | Daniel Corral; Mexico | Luis Vargas; Puerto Rico | None awarded |
| Men's parallel bars | Daniel Corral; Mexico | Paul Ruggeri; United States | None awarded |
| Men's pommel horse | Daniel Corral; Mexico | Jorge Hugo Giraldo; Colombia | Jorge Pena; Colombia |
| Men's rings | Brandon Wynn; United States | Arthur Zanetti; Brazil | Christopher Maestas; United States |
| Women's uneven bars | Bridgette Caquatto; United States | Shawn Johnson; United States | Elsa García; Mexico |
| Women's uneven bars | Bridgette Caquatto; United States | Shawn Johnson; United States | Marisela Cantú; Mexico |
| Men's vault | Diego Hypólito; Brazil | Tomás González; Chile | Hugh Smith; Canada |
| Women's vault | Brandie Jay; United States | Elsa García; Mexico | Catalina Escobar; Colombia |

=== Rhythmic ===
| Event | Gold | Silver | Bronze |
|---|---|---|---|
| Individual all-around | Julie Zetlin; United States | Cynthia Valdez; Mexico | Angélica Kvieczynski; Brazil |
| Individual ball | Julie Zetlin; United States | Cynthia Valdez; Mexico | Angélica Kvieczynski; Brazil |
| Individual club | Cynthia Valdez; Mexico | Angélica Kvieczynski; Brazil | Mariam Chamilova; Canada |
| Individual hoop | Cynthia Valdez; Mexico | Julie Zetlin; United States | Angélica Kvieczynski; Brazil |
| Individual ribbon | Julie Zetlin; United States | Cynthia Valdez; Mexico | Ana Carrasco; Argentina |
| Group all-around | Brazil; Dayane Amaral; Debora Falda; Luisa Matsuo; Bianca Mendonça; Eliane Sampaio; Drielly Altoe | Canada; Katrina Cameron; Rose Cossar; Alexandra Landry; Anastasiya Muntyanu; Anjelika Reznik; Kelsey Titmarsh | Cuba; Maydelis Delgado; Zenia Fernandez; Lianet Jose; Martha Perez; Yeney Renovales; Legna Savon |
| 5 balls | Brazil; Dayane Amaral; Debora Falda; Luisa Matsuo; Bianca Mendonça; Eliane Sampaio; Drielly Altoe | United States; Jessica Bogdanov; Megan Frohlich; Aimee Gupta; Michelle Przybylo; Sofya Roytburg; Sydney Sachs | Canada; Katrina Cameron; Rose Cossar; Alexandra Landry; Anastasiya Muntyanu; Anjelika Reznik; Kelsey Titmarsh |
| 3 ribbons + 2 hoops | Brazil; Dayane Amaral; Debora Falda; Luisa Matsuo; Bianca Mendonça; Eliane Sampaio; Drielly Altoe | Canada; Katrina Cameron; Rose Cossar; Alexandra Landry; Anastasiya Muntyanu; Anjelika Reznik; Kelsey Titmarsh | United States; Jessica Bogdanov; Megan Frohlich; Aimee Gupta; Michelle Przybylo; Sofya Roytburg; Sydney Sachs |
| Group 5 balls | Brazil; Dayane Amaral; Debora Falda; Luisa Matsuo; Bianca Mendonça; Eliane Sampaio; Drielly Altoe | United States; Jessica Bogdanov; Megan Frohlich; Aimee Gupta; Michelle Przybylo; Sofya Roytburg; Sydney Sachs | Canada; Katrina Cameron; Rose Cossar; Alexandra Landry; Anastasiya Muntyanu; Anjelika Reznik; Kelsey Titmarsh |
| Group 3 ribbons + 2 hoops | Brazil; Dayane Amaral; Debora Falda; Luisa Matsuo; Bianca Mendonça; Eliane Sampaio; Drielly Altoe | Canada; Katrina Cameron; Rose Cossar; Alexandra Landry; Anastasiya Muntyanu; Anjelika Reznik; Kelsey Titmarsh | United States; Jessica Bogdanov; Megan Frohlich; Aimee Gupta; Michelle Przybylo; Sofya Roytburg; Sydney Sachs |

=== Trampoline ===
| Event | Gold | Silver | Bronze |
|---|---|---|---|
| Men's individual | Keegan Soehn; Canada | Rafael Andrade; Brazil | José Alberto Vargas; Mexico |
| Women's individual | Rosannagh MacLennan; Canada | Dakota Earnest; United States | Alaina Williams; United States |

== Handball ==
| Event | Gold | Silver | Bronze |
|---|---|---|---|
| Men's tournament | Argentina; Gonzalo Carou; Federico Fernandez; Fernando Garcia; Juan Fernandez; Andrés Kogovsek; Damián Migueles; Federico Pizarro; Cristian Plati; Pablo Portela; Leonardo Querin; Matías Schulz; Diego Simonet; Sebastián Simonet; Juan Vidal; Federico Vieyra | Brazil; Leonardo Bortolini; Gustavo Cardoso; Fábio Chiuffa; Bruno De Santana; Marcos Dos Santos; Thiagus Dos Santos; Jaqson Kojoroski; Fernando Filho; Gil Pires; Felipe Ribeiro; Renato Rui; Maik Santos; Ales Silva; Henrique Teixeira; Vinícius Teixeira | Chile; Guillermo Araya; Felipe Barrientos; Rodolfo Cornejo; Rodrigo Diaz; Emil Feuchtmann; Erwin Feuchtmann; Harald Feuchtmann; Nicolas Jofre; Patricio Martinez; Felipe Maurin; René Oliva; Marco Oneto; Esteban Salinas; Rodrigo Salinas; Alfredo Valenzuela |
| Women's tournament | Brazil; Eduarda Amorim; Bárbara Arenhart; Moniky Bancilon; Francine Cararo; Deonise Cavaleiro; Fernanda da Silva; Fabiana Diniz; Alexandra do Nascimento; Mayara Moura; Daniela Piedade; Silvia Pinheiro; Jéssica Quintino; Samira Rocha; Ana Paula Rodrigues; Chana Souza | Argentina; Maria Belotti; Valeria Bianchi; Maria Decilio; Bibiana Ferrea; Lucia Haro; Valentina Kogan; Antonela Mena; Luciana Mendoza; Manuela Pizzo; Maria Romero; Noelia Sala; Luciana Salvado; Silvina Schlesinger; Solange Tagliavini; Silvana Totolo | Dominican Republic; Mariela Andino; Mariela Céspedes; Mari Tavares; Cari Dominguez; Mileidys Garcia; Judith Granado; Crisleydy Hernandez; Carolina Lopez; Yndiana Mateo; Nancy Peña; Johanna Pimentel; Jessica Sierra; Suleidi Suarez; Yacaira Tejeda; Debora Ortiz |

== Judo ==
| Event | Gold | Silver | Bronze |
|---|---|---|---|
| Men's 60 kg | Felipe Kitadai; Brazil | Nabor Castillo; Mexico | Juan Postigos; Peru |
| Men's 60 kg | Felipe Kitadai; Brazil | Nabor Castillo; Mexico | Aaron Kunihiro; United States |
| Men's 66 kg | Leandro Da Cunha; Brazil | Kenneth Hashimoto; United States | Anyelo Gomez; Cuba |
| Men's 66 kg | Leandro Da Cunha; Brazil | Kenneth Hashimoto; United States | Ricardo Valderrama; Venezuela |
| Men's 73 kg | Bruno Silva; Brazil | Alejandro Clara; Argentina | Nicholas Tritton; Canada |
| Men's 73 kg | Bruno Silva; Brazil | Alejandro Clara; Argentina | Ronald Girones; Cuba |
| Men's 81 kg | Leandro Guilheiro; Brazil | Gadiel Miranda; Puerto Rico | Antoine Valois; Canada |
| Men's 81 kg | Leandro Guilheiro; Brazil | Gadiel Miranda; Puerto Rico | Emmanuel Lucenti; Argentina |
| Men's 90 kg | Tiago Camilo; Brazil | Asley González; Cuba | Alexandre Emond; Canada |
| Men's 90 kg | Tiago Camilo; Brazil | Asley González; Cuba | Isao Cardenas; Mexico |
| Men's 100 kg | Luciano Corrêa; Brazil | Oreydis Despaigne; Cuba | Cristian Schmidt; Argentina |
| Men's 100 kg | Luciano Corrêa; Brazil | Oreydis Despaigne; Cuba | Sergio García; Mexico |
| Men's +100 kg | Óscar Brayson; Cuba | Rafael Silva; Brazil | Luis Salazar; Colombia |
| Men's +100 kg | Óscar Brayson; Cuba | Rafael Silva; Brazil | Ramon Flores; Mexico |
| Women's 48 kg | Paula Pareto; Argentina | Dayaris Mestre; Cuba | Angela Woosley; United States |
| Women's 48 kg | Paula Pareto; Argentina | Dayaris Mestre; Cuba | Sarah Menezes; Brazil |
| Women's 52 kg | Yanet Bermoy; Cuba | Érika Miranda; Brazil | Yulieth Sánchez; United States |
| Women's 52 kg | Yanet Bermoy; Cuba | Érika Miranda; Brazil | Aaron Kunihiro; Colombia |
| Women's 57 kg | Yurisleidy Lupetey; Cuba | Rafaela Silva; Brazil | Joliane Melançon; Canada |
| Women's 57 kg | Yurisleidy Lupetey; Cuba | Rafaela Silva; Brazil | Hana Carmichael; United States |
| Women's 63 kg | Yaritza Abel; Cuba | Karina Acosta; Mexico | Christal Ransom; United States |
| Women's 63 kg | Yaritza Abel; Cuba | Karina Acosta; Mexico | Stéfanie Tremblay; Canada |
| Women's 70 kg | Onix Cortés; Cuba | Yuri Alvear; Colombia | Maria Perez; Puerto Rico |
| Women's 70 kg | Onix Cortés; Cuba | Yuri Alvear; Colombia | Maria Mazzoleni; Brazil |
| Women's 78 kg | Kayla Harrison; United States | Catherine Roberge; Canada | Yalennis Castillo; Cuba |
| Women's 78 kg | Kayla Harrison; United States | Catherine Roberge; Canada | Mayra Da Silva; Brazil |
| Women's +78 kg | Idalys Ortiz; Cuba | Melissa Mojica; Puerto Rico | Maria Altherman; Brazil |
| Women's +78 kg | Idalys Ortiz; Cuba | Melissa Mojica; Puerto Rico | Vanessa Zambotti; Mexico |

== Karate ==
| Event | Gold | Silver | Bronze |
|---|---|---|---|
| Men's 60 kg | Andrés Rendón; Colombia | Norberto Sosa; Dominican Republic | Douglas Brose; Brazil |
| Men's 60 kg | Andrés Rendón; Colombia | Norberto Sosa; Dominican Republic | Miguel Soffia; Chile |
| Men's 67 kg | Daniel Viveros; Ecuador | Dennis Novo; Cuba | Daniel Carrillo; Mexico |
| Men's 67 kg | Daniel Viveros; Ecuador | Dennis Novo; Cuba | Jean Carlos Peña; Venezuela |
| Men's 75 kg | Dionicio Gustavo; Dominican Republic | Thomas Scott; United States | Lester Zamora; Cuba |
| Men's 75 kg | Dionicio Gustavo; Dominican Republic | Thomas Scott; United States | David Dubó; Chile |
| Men's 84 kg | Cesar Herrera; Venezuela | Jorge Perez; Dominican Republic | Homero Morales; Mexico |
| Men's 84 kg | Cesar Herrera; Venezuela | Jorge Perez; Dominican Republic | Sorin Alexadnru; Canada |
| Men's +84 kg | Angel Aponte; Venezuela | Alberto Ramirez; Mexico | Wellington Barbosa; Brazil |
| Men's +84 kg | Angel Aponte; Venezuela | Alberto Ramirez; Mexico | Shaun Dhillon; Canada |
| Women's 50 kg | Ana Villanueva; Dominican Republic | Gabriela Bruna; Chile | Jessica Candido; Brazil |
| Women's 50 kg | Ana Villanueva; Dominican Republic | Gabriela Bruna; Chile | Cheili Gonzalez; Guatemala |
| Women's 55 kg | Shannon Nishi; United States | Karina Diaz; Dominican Republic | Valéria Kumizaki; Brazil |
| Women's 55 kg | Shannon Nishi; United States | Karina Diaz; Dominican Republic | Jessy Reyes; Chile |
| Women's 61 kg | Bertha Gutierrez; Mexico | Alexandra Grande; Peru | Daniela Suarez; Venezuela |
| Women's 61 kg | Bertha Gutierrez; Mexico | Alexandra Grande; Peru | Marisca Verspaget; Netherlands Antilles |
| Women's 68 kg | Lucelia Ribeiro; Brazil | Yadira Lira; Mexico | Yoly Guillen; Venezuela |
| Women's 68 kg | Lucelia Ribeiro; Brazil | Yadira Lira; Mexico | Yoandra Moreno; Cuba |
| Women's +68 kg | Maria Castellanos; Guatemala | Xunashi Caballero; Mexico | Olivia Grant; Canada |
| Women's +68 kg | Maria Castellanos; Guatemala | Xunashi Caballero; Mexico | Claudia Vera; Chile |

== Modern pentathlon ==
| Event | Gold | Silver | Bronze |
|---|---|---|---|
| Men's | Óscar Soto; Mexico | Andrei Gheorghe; Guatemala | Esteban Bustos; Chile |
| Women's | Margaux Isaksen; United States | Yane Marques; Brazil | Tamara Vega; Mexico |

== Racquetball ==
| Event | Gold | Silver | Bronze |
|---|---|---|---|
| Men's singles | Rocky Carson; United States | Gilberto Mejia; Mexico | Vincent Gagnon; Canada |
| Men's singles | Rocky Carson; United States | Gilberto Mejia; Mexico | Álvaro Beltrán; Mexico |
| Women's singles | Paola Longoria; Mexico | Rhonda Rajsich; United States | Cheryl Gudinas; United States |
| Women's singles | Paola Longoria; Mexico | Rhonda Rajsich; United States | María Vargas; Bolivia |
| Men's doubles | Mexico; Álvaro Beltrán; Javier Moreno | Venezuela; César Castro; Jorge Hirsekorn | Canada; Timothy Landeryou; Kristofer Odegard |
| Men's doubles | Mexico; Álvaro Beltrán; Javier Moreno | Venezuela; César Castro; Jorge Hirsekorn | United States; Shane Vanderson; Christopher Crowther |
| Women's doubles | Mexico; Paola Longoria; Samantha Salas | United States; Rhonda Rajsich; Aimee Ruiz | Ecuador; María Córdova; María Muñoz |
| Women's doubles | Mexico; Paola Longoria; Samantha Salas | United States; Rhonda Rajsich; Aimee Ruiz | Chile; Angela Grisar; Carla Muñoz |
| Men's team | Mexico; Álvaro Beltrán; Javier Moreno | United States; Rocky Carson; Shane Vanderson; Christopher Crowther | Colombia; Cesar Castillo; Jorge Hirsekorn |
| Men's team | Mexico; Álvaro Beltrán; Javier Moreno | United States; Rocky Carson; Shane Vanderson; Christopher Crowther | Ecuador; Fernando Rios; Jose Alvarez |
| Women's team | Mexico; Paola Longoria; Samantha Salas | United States; Cheryl Gudinas; Rhonda Rajsich; Aimee Ruiz | Ecuador; María Muñoz; María Córdova |
| Women's team | Mexico; Paola Longoria; Samantha Salas | United States; Cheryl Gudinas; Rhonda Rajsich; Aimee Ruiz | Bolivia; Cintia Loma; Jenny Daza |

== Roller skating ==
| Event | Gold | Silver | Bronze |
|---|---|---|---|
| Men's 300 metres time-trial | Pedro Causil; Colombia | Emanuelle Silva; Chile | Juan Cruz Araldi; Argentina |
| Women's 300 metres time-trial | Yersy Puello; Colombia | Maria Moya; Chile | Veronica Elias; Mexico |
| Men's 1000 metres | Pedro Causil; Colombia | Ezequiel Capellano; Argentina | Jorge Reyes; Chile |
| Women's 1000 metres | Yersy Puello; Colombia | Sandra Buelvas; Venezuela | Melisa Bonnet; Argentina |
| Men's 10,000 metres points + elimination race | Jorge Bolaños; Ecuador | Ezequiel Capellano; Argentina | Jorge Reyes; Chile |
| Women's 10,000 metres points + elimination race | Kelly Martínez; Colombia | Melisa Bonnet; Argentina | Catherine Penan; Chile |
| Men's free skating | Marcel Sturmer; Brazil | Daniel Arriola; Argentina | Leonardo Parrado; Colombia |
| Women's free skating | Elizabeth Soler; Argentina | Marisol Villarroel; Chile | Talitha Haas; Brazil |

== Rowing ==
| Event | Gold | Silver | Bronze |
|---|---|---|---|
| Men's single sculls | Ángel Fournier; Cuba | Patrick Loliger; Mexico | Emilio Torres; Venezuela |
| Women's single sculls | Margot Shumway; United States | Maria Best; Argentina | Isolda Penney; Canada |
| Women's lightweight single sculls | Jennifer Goldsack; United States | Fabiana Beltrame; Brazil | Yaima Velázquez; Cuba |
| Men's double sculls | Argentina; Cristian Rosso; Ariel Suarez | Cuba; Janier Concepción; Yoennis Hernández | Venezuela; Cesar Amaris; José Güipe |
| Women's double sculls | Cuba; Yariulvis Cobas; Aimee Hernandez | United States; Megan Walsh; Catherine Reddick | Canada; Barbara McCord; Audra Vair |
| Men's lightweight double sculls | Mexico; Alan Armenta; Gerardo Sanchez | Cuba; Yunior Perez; Eyder Batista | Canada; Travis King; Terence McKall |
| Women's lightweight double sculls | Mexico; Analicia Ramirez; Lila Perez Rul | Cuba; Yaima Velázquez; Yoslaine Dominguez | United States; Michelle Sechser; Chelsea Smith |
| Men's quadruple sculls | Argentina; Alejandro Cucchietti; Santiago Fernández; Cristian Rosso; Ariel Suarez | Cuba; Janier Concepción; Adrian Oquendo; Eduardo Eubio; Yoennis Hernández | Mexico; Horacio Rangel; Edgar Valenzuela; Patrick Loliger; Santiago Sataella |
| Women's quadruple sculls | Argentina; Maria Abalo; Maria Best; Milka Kraljev; Maria Rohner | Canada; Melanie Kok; Barbara McCord; Audra Vair; Isolda Penney | United States; Megan Walsh; Michelle Sechser; Catherine Reddick; Chelsea Smith |
| Men's coxless pair | United States; Michael Gennaro; Robert Otto | Brazil; Joao Borges; Alexis Mestre | Canada; Peter McClelland; Steven Van Knotsenburg |
| Women's coxless pair | Argentina; Maria Abalo; Maria Best | United States; Monica George; Megan Smith | Canada; Sarah Bonikowsky; Sandra Kisil |
| Men's coxless four | Argentina; Sebastian Fernandez; Joaquin Iwan; Rodrigo Murillo; Agustin Silvestro | Canada; David Wakulich; Kai Langerfield; Blake Parsons; Spencer Crowley | Cuba; Yenser Basilo; Dionnis Carrion; Jorber Avila; Solaris Freire |
| Men's lightweight coxless four | Cuba; Wilber Turro; Liosbel Hernandez; Liosmel Ramos; Manuel Suárez | Argentina; Nicolai Fernandez; Diego Gallina; Carlo Lauro; Pablo Mahnic | Chile; Félipe Leal; Fernando Miralles; Rodrigo Muñoz; Fabian Oyarzun |
| Men's coxed eight | United States; Jason Read; Stephen Kasprzyk; Matthew Wheeler; Joseph Spencer; Michael Gennaro; Robert Otto; Blaise Didier; Marcus McElhenney; Derek Johnson | Canada; Peter McClelland; Steven Van Knotsenburg; David Wakulich; Kai Langerfield; Blake Parsons; Spencer Crowley; Joshua Morris; Benjamin De Wit; Mark Laidlaw | Argentina; Sebastian Fernandez; Joaquin Iwan; Rodrigo Murillo; Agustin Silvestro; Sebastian Claus; Diego Lopez; Joel Infante; Mariano Sosa; Ariel Suarez |

== Rugby sevens ==
| Event | Gold | Silver | Bronze |
|---|---|---|---|
| Men's tournament | Canada; Nanyak Dala; Sean Duke; Matt Evans; Sean White; Ciaran Hearn; Nathan Hirayama; Tyler Ardon; Phil Mack; John Moonlight; Taylor Paris; Mike Scholz; Conor Trainor | Argentina; Gabriel Ascarate; Santiago Bottini; Nicolas Bruzzone; Francisco Cuneo; Manuel Gutiérrez; Joaquin Luccheti; Jose Merello; Manuel Montero; Ramiro Moyano; Hernan Olivari; Javier Ortega; Diego Palma | United States; Mark Bokhoven; Colin Hawley; Rocco Mauer; Folau Niua; Milemoti Pulu; Bernard Punimata; Blaine Scully; Jordan Suniula; Nigel Suniula; Zachary Test; Peter Tiberio; Kisi Unufe |

== Sailing ==
| Event | Gold | Silver | Bronze |
|---|---|---|---|
| Men's Sailboard | Ricardo Santos; Brazil | Mariano Reutemann; Argentina | David Mier; Mexico |
| Women's Sailboard | Patricia Freitas; Brazil | Demita Vega; Mexico | Farrah Hall; United States |
| Men's Laser | Julio Alsogaray; Argentina | Matias Del Solar; Chile | Juan Ignacio Maegli; Guatemala |
| Women's Laser Radial | Cecilia Saroli; Argentina | Tania Calles; Mexico | Paige Railey; United States |
| Sunfish class | Matheus Dellangnello; Brazil | Paul Foerster; United States | Francisco Renna; Argentina |
| Snipe class | Brazil; Alexandre do Amaral; Gabriel Borges | United States; Agustin Diaz; Kathleen Tocke | Uruguay; Pablo Defazio; Manfredo Finck |
| Lightning class | Chile; Alberto González; Diego González; Cristian Herman | United States; Jody Lutz; Derek Gauger; Jay Lutz | Brazil; Claudio Biekarck; Marcelo da Silva; Gunnar Ficker |
| Hobie 16 class | Puerto Rico; Enrique Figueroa; Victor Aponte | Brazil; Bernardo Arndt; Bruno Oliveira | Guatemala; Jason Hess; Jose Hernandez |
| J/24 class | Brazil; Mauricio Oliveira; Alexandre de Silva; Guilherme Hamelmann; Daniel Santiago | United States; John Mollicone; George Abdullah III; Geoffrey Becker; Daniel Rabin | Chile; Matias Seguel; Cristobal Grez; Marc Jux; Juan Lira |

== Shooting ==
| Event | Gold | Silver | Bronze |
|---|---|---|---|
| Men's 10 metre air pistol | Daryl Szarenszki; United States | Roger Daniel; Trinidad and Tobago | Júlio Almeida; Brazil |
| Women's 10 metre air pistol | Dorothy Ludwig; Canada | Maribel Pineda; Venezuela | Sandra Uptagrafft; United States |
| Men's 25 metre rapid fire pistol | Emil Milev; United States | Juan Perez; Cuba | Franco Di Mauro; Venezuela |
| Women's 25 metre pistol | Ana Luiza Mello; Brazil | Sandra Uptagrafft; United States | Maribel Pineda; Venezuela |
| Men's 50 metre pistol | Sergio Sanchez; Guatemala | Daryl Szarenszki; United States | Júlio Almeida; Brazil |
| Men's 10 metre air rifle | Matthew Rawlings; United States | Jonathan Hall; United States | Gonzalo Moncada; Chile |
| Women's 10 metre air rifle | Emily Caruso; United States | Eglys De La Cruz; Cuba | Rosa Del Carmen Peña; Mexico |
| Men's 50 metre rifle prone | Michael McPhail; United States | Alex Suligoy; Argentina | Jason Parker; United States |
| Men's 50 metre rifle three positions | Jason Parker; United States | Matthew Wallace; United States | Bruno Heck; Brazil |
| Women's 50 metre rifle three positions | Dianelys Pérez; Cuba | Eglys De La Cruz; Cuba | Sarah Beard; United States |
| Men's trap | Jean Pierre Brol; Guatemala | Danilo Caro; Colombia | Roberto Schmits; Brazil |
| Women's trap | Miranda Wilder; United States | Lindsay Boddez; Canada | Kayla Browning; United States |
| Men's double trap | Walton Eller; United States | José Torres; Puerto Rico | Luiz Da Graca; Brazil |
| Men's skeet | Vincent Hancock; United States | Guillermo Torres; Cuba | Juan Rodriguez; Cuba |
| Women's skeet | Kimberley Rhode; United States | Francisca Crovetto; Chile | Melisa Gil; Argentina |

== Softball ==
| Event | Gold | Silver | Bronze |
|---|---|---|---|
| Women's | United States; Chelsea Thomas; Kelly Grieve; Rhea Taylor; Stacy Johnson; Jordan Taylor; Kaitlin Cochran; Keilani Ricketts; Whitney Canion; Michelle Moultrie; Christine Orgeron; Molly Johnson; Valerie Arioto; Ashley Holcombe; Lauren Gibson; Amelia Leles; Meagan May; Taylor Hoagland | Canada; Jenna Caira; Jocelyn Cater; Erin Cumpstone; Heather Ebert; Kelsey Haberl; Victoria Hayward; Ashley Lanz; Danielle Lopez; Joey Lye; Melanie Matthews; Sarah Phillips; Kaleigh Rafter; Jillian Russell; Jennifer Salling; Hannah Schwarz; Megan Timpf; Jennifer Yee | Cuba; Ludisleydis Nápoles; Marlen Bubaire; Lidibet Castellon; Anisley Lopez; Katia Coello; Maylin Sanchez; Yusmelis Ocaña; Yaleisa Soto; Yanitza Avilés; Aleanna de Armas; Maritza Toledo; Yamisleidys Casanova; Yuselys Acosta; Diamela Puentes; Yusmeri Pacheco; Yarisleidy Rosario; Leanneyi Gomez |

== Squash ==
| Event | Gold | Silver | Bronze |
|---|---|---|---|
| Men's singles | Miguel Ángel Rodríguez; Colombia | César Salazar; Mexico | Shawn Delierre; Canada |
| Men's singles | Miguel Ángel Rodríguez; Colombia | César Salazar; Mexico | Arturo Salazar; Mexico |
| Women's singles | Samantha Terán; Mexico | Samantha Cornett; Canada | Miranda Ranieri; Canada |
| Women's singles | Samantha Terán; Mexico | Samantha Cornett; Canada | Nicolette Fernandes; Guyana |
| Men's doubles | Mexico; Arturo Salazar; Eric Gálvez | United States; Christopher Gordon; Julian Illingworth | Paraguay; Esteban Casarino; Nicolas Caballero |
| Men's doubles | Mexico; Arturo Salazar; Eric Gálvez | United States; Christopher Gordon; Julian Illingworth | Argentina; Hernán D'Arcangelo; Robertino Pezzota |
| Women's doubles | Mexico; Nayelly Hernández; Samantha Terán | Colombia; Catalina Peláez; Silvia Angulo | Canada; Miranda Ranieri; Stephanie Edmison |
| Women's doubles | Mexico; Nayelly Hernández; Samantha Terán | Colombia; Catalina Peláez; Silvia Angulo | United States; Olivia Clyne; Maria Ubina |
| Men's team | Mexico; Arturo Salazar; Eric Gálvez; César Salazar | Canada; Shawn Delierre; Andrew Schnell; Shahier Razik | Brazil; Vinicius De Lima; Vinicius Rodrigues; Rafael Fernandes |
| Men's team | Mexico; Arturo Salazar; Eric Gálvez; César Salazar | Canada; Shawn Delierre; Andrew Schnell; Shahier Razik | United States; Julian Illingworth; Christopher Gordon; Graham Bassett |
| Women's team | Canada; Miranda Ranieri; Samantha Cornett; Stephanie Edmison | Colombia; Silvia Angulo; Catalina Peláez; Anna Porras | Mexico; Nayelly Hernández; Samantha Terán; Imelda Salazar |
| Women's team | Canada; Miranda Ranieri; Samantha Cornett; Stephanie Edmison | Colombia; Silvia Angulo; Catalina Peláez; Anna Porras | United States; Olivia Clyne; Maria Ubina; Lily Lorentzen |

== Swimming ==
| Event | Gold | Silver | Bronze |
|---|---|---|---|
| Men's 50 m freestyle | César Cielo; Brazil | Bruno Fratus; Brazil | Hanser García; Cuba |
| Women's 50 m freestyle | Lara Jackson; United States | Graciele Herrmann; Brazil | Madison Kennedy; United States |
| Men's 100 m freestyle | César Cielo; Brazil | Hanser García; Cuba | Shaune Fraser; Cayman Islands |
| Women's 100 m freestyle | Amanda Kendall; United States | Erika Erndl; United States | Arlene Semeco; Venezuela |
| Men's 200 m freestyle | Brett Fraser; Cayman Islands | Shaune Fraser; Cayman Islands | Benjamin Hockin; Paraguay |
| Women's 200 m freestyle | Catherine Breed; United States | Chelsea Nauta; United States | Andreina Pinto; Venezuela |
| Men's 400 m freestyle | Charlie Houchin; United States | Matt Patton; United States | Cristian Quintero; Venezuela |
| Women's 400 m freestyle | Gillian Ryan; United States | Andreina Pinto; Venezuela | Kristel Köbrich; Chile |
| Women's 800 m freestyle | Kristel Köbrich; Chile | Ashley Twichell; United States | Andreina Pinto; Venezuela |
| Men's 1500 m freestyle | Arthur Frayler; United States | Joseph Feely; United States | Juan Pereyra; Argentina |
| Men's 100 m backstroke | Thiago Pereira; Brazil | Eugene Godsoe; United States | Guilherme Guido; Brazil |
| Women's 100 m backstroke | Rachel Bootsma; United States | Elizabeth Pelton; United States | Fernanda González; Mexico |
| Men's 200 m backstroke | Thiago Pereira; Brazil | Omar Pinzón; Colombia | Ryan Murphy; United States |
| Women's 200 m backstroke | Elizabeth Pelton; United States | Bonnie Brandon; United States | Fernanda González; Mexico |
| Men's 100 m breaststroke | Felipe França Silva; Brazil | Felipe Lima; Brazil | Marcus Titus; United States |
| Women's 100 m breaststroke | Annie Chandler; United States | Ashley Wanland; United States | Ashley McGregor; Canada |
| Men's 200 m breaststroke | Sean Mahoney; United States | Clark Burckle; United States | Thiago Pereira; Brazil |
| Women's 200 m breaststroke | Ashley McGregor; Canada | Haley Spencer; United States | Michelle McKeehan; United States |
| Men's 100 m butterfly | Albert Subirats; Venezuela | Eugene Godsoe; United States | Chris Brady; United States |
| Women's 100 m butterfly | Claire Donahue; United States | Daynara de Paula; Brazil | Elaine Breeden; United States |
| Men's 200 m butterfly | Leonardo De Deus; Brazil | Daniel Madwed; United States | Kaio Almeida; Brazil |
| Women's 200 m butterfly | Kim Vandenberg; United States | Lyndsay DePaul; United States | Rita Medrano; Mexico |
| Men's 200 m individual medley | Thiago Pereira; Brazil | Conor Dwyer; United States | Henrique Rodrigues; Brazil |
| Women's 200 m individual medley | Julia Smit; United States | Alia Atkinson; Jamaica | Joanna Maranhão; Brazil |
| Men's 400 m individual medley | Thiago Pereira; Brazil | Conor Dwyer; United States | Robert Margalis; United States |
| Women's 400 m individual medley | Julia Smit; United States | Joanna Maranhão; Brazil | Allysa Vavra; United States |
| Men's 4×100 m freestyle relay | Brazil; César Cielo; Bruno Fratus; Nicholas Santos; Nicolas Oliveira; Gabriel Mangabeira; Thiago Pereira; Henrique Rodrigues | United States; William Copeland; Chris Brady; Bobby Savulich; Scot Robison; Eugene Godsoe; Conor Dwyer | Venezuela; Octavio Alesi; Crox Acuña; Cristian Quintero; Albert Subirats; Luis Rojas; Roberto Gomez; Daniele Tirabassi |
| Women's 4×100 m freestyle relay | United States; Madison Kennedy; Elizabeth Pelton; Amanda Kendall; Erika Erndl | Brazil; Michelle Lenhardt; Flávia Delaroli; Tatiana Barbosa; Daynara de Paula; Graciele Herrmann | Canada; Jennifer Beckberger; Caroline Lapierre; Ashley McGregor; Paige Schultz; Gabrielle Soucisse |
| Men's 4×200 m freestyle relay | United States; Conor Dwyer; Scot Robison; Charlie Houchin; Matt Patton; Daniel Madwed; Ryan Feeley; Rex Tullius; Robert Margalis | Brazil; André Schultz; Nicolas Oliveira; Leonardo de Deus; Thiago Pereira; Giuliano Rocco; Lucas Kanieski; Diogo Yabe | Venezuela; Daniele Tirabassi; Cristian Quintero; Crox Acuña; Marcos Lavado; Eddy Marin; Ricardo Monasterio; Alejandro Gomez |
| Women's 4×200 m freestyle relay | United States; Catherine Breed; Elizabeth Pelton; Chelsea Nauta; Amanda Kendall; Kim Vandenberg; Erika Erndl | Brazil; Joanna Maranhão; Jéssica Cavalheiro; Manuella Lyrio; Tatiana Barbosa; Sarah Correa; Gabriela Rocha; Larissa Cieslak; Thamy Ventorini | Mexico; Liliana Ibáñez; Patricia Castañeda Miyamoto; Fernanda González; Susana Escobar; Martha Beltrán; Rita Medrano |
| Men's 4×100 m medley relay | Brazil; Guilherme Guido; Felipe França Silva; Gabriel Mangabeira; César Cielo; Thiago Pereira; Felipe Lima; Kaio Almeida; Bruno Fratus | United States; Eugene Godsoe; Marcus Titus; Chris Brady; Scot Robison; David Russell; Kevin Swander; Bobby Savulich | Argentina; Federico Grabich; Lucas Peralta; Marcos Barale; Lucas Del Piccolo |
| Women's 4×100 m medley relay | United States; Rachel Bootsma; Annie Chandler; Claire Donahue; Amanda Kendall; Elizabeth Pelton; Ashley Wanland; Elaine Breeden; Erika Erndl | Canada; Ashley McGregor; Gabrielle Soucisse; Erin Miller; Jennifer Beckberger; Brenna MacLean; Kierra Smith; Samantha Corea; Caroline Lapierre | Brazil; Fabíola Molina; Tatiane Sakemi; Daynara de Paula; Tatiana Barbosa |
| Men's 10 km marathon | Richard Weinberger; Canada | Arthur Frayler; United States | Guillermo Bertola; Argentina |
| Women's 10 km marathon | Cecilia Biagioli; Argentina | Poliana Okimoto; Brazil | Christine Jennings; United States |

== Synchronized swimming ==
| Event | Gold | Silver | Bronze |
|---|---|---|---|
| Duet | Canada; Élise Marcotte; Marie-Pier Boudreau Gagnon | United States; Mary Killman; Mariya Koroleva | Brazil; Lara Teixeira; Nayara Figueira |
| Team | Canada; Marie-Pier Boudreau Gagnon; Jo-Annie Fortin; Chloé Isaac; Stéphanie Leclair; Tracy Little; Élise Marcotte; Karine Thomas; Valérie Welsh | United States; Morgan Fuller; Megan Hansley; Mary Killman; Mariya Koroleva; Michelle Moore; Leah Pinette; Lyssa Wallace; Alison Williams | Brazil; Giovana Stephan; Joseane Costa; Lara Teixeira; Lorena Molinos; Maria Bruno; Maria Pereira; Nayara Figueira; Pamela Nogueira |

== Table tennis ==
| Event | Gold | Silver | Bronze |
|---|---|---|---|
| Men's singles | Liu Song; Argentina | Marcos Madrid; Mexico | Alberto Mino; Ecuador |
| Men's singles | Liu Song; Argentina | Marcos Madrid; Mexico | Lin Ju; Dominican Republic |
| Women's singles | Zhang Mo; Canada | Wu Xue; Dominican Republic | Lily Zhang; United States |
| Women's singles | Zhang Mo; Canada | Wu Xue; Dominican Republic | Ariel Hsing; United States |
| Men's team | Brazil; Hugo Hoyama; Gustavo Tsuboi; Thiago Monteiro | Argentina; Pablo Tabachnik; Liu Song; Gaston Alto | Cuba; Andy Pereira; Jorge Campos; Pavel Oxamendi |
| Men's team | Brazil; Hugo Hoyama; Gustavo Tsuboi; Thiago Monteiro | Argentina; Pablo Tabachnik; Liu Song; Gaston Alto | Mexico; Marcos Madrid; Guillermo Munoz; Jude Okoh |
| Women's team | Dominican Republic; Wu Xue; Johenny Valdez; Eva Brito | Venezuela; Fabiola Ramos; Ruaida Ezzeddine; Luisana Perez | United States; Ariel Hsing; Lily Zhang; Erica Wu |
| Women's team | Dominican Republic; Wu Xue; Johenny Valdez; Eva Brito | Venezuela; Fabiola Ramos; Ruaida Ezzeddine; Luisana Perez | Colombia; Paula Medina; Luisa Zuluaga; Johana Araque |

== Taekwondo ==
| Event | Gold | Silver | Bronze |
|---|---|---|---|
| Men's 58 kg | Gabriel Mercedes; Dominican Republic | Damián Villa; Mexico | Frank Diaz; Cuba |
| Men's 58 kg | Gabriel Mercedes; Dominican Republic | Damián Villa; Mexico | Marcio Ferreira; Brazil |
| Lightweight (68 kg) | Jhohanny Jean; Dominican Republic | Angel Mora; Cuba | Terrence Jennings; United States |
| Lightweight (68 kg) | Jhohanny Jean; Dominican Republic | Angel Mora; Cuba | Mario Guerra; Chile |
| Middleweight (80 kg) | Sebastián Crismanich; Argentina | Carlos Vazquez; Venezuela | Uriel Adriano; Mexico |
| Middleweight (80 kg) | Sebastián Crismanich; Argentina | Carlos Vazquez; Venezuela | Stuardo Solorzano; Guatemala |
| Heavyweight (+80 kg) | Robelis Despaigne; Cuba | Juan Carlos Diaz; Venezuela | François Coulombe-Fortier; Canada |
| Heavyweight (+80 kg) | Robelis Despaigne; Cuba | Juan Carlos Diaz; Venezuela | Stephen Lambdin; United States |
| Women's 49 kg | Ivett Gonda; Canada | Lizbeth Diez-Canseco; Peru | Deireanne Morales; United States |
| Women's 49 kg | Ivett Gonda; Canada | Lizbeth Diez-Canseco; Peru | Jannet Alegria; Mexico |
| Lightweight (57 kg) | Irma Contreras; Mexico | Doris Patiño; Colombia | Nicole Palma; United States |
| Lightweight (57 kg) | Irma Contreras; Mexico | Doris Patiño; Colombia | Yeny Contreras; Chile |
| Middleweight (67 kg) | Melissa Pagnotta; Canada | Paige McPherson; United States | Katherine Rodríguez; Dominican Republic |
| Middleweight (67 kg) | Melissa Pagnotta; Canada | Paige McPherson; United States | Taimi Castellanos; Cuba |
| Heavyweight (+67 kg) | Glenhis Hernández; Cuba | Nikki Martínez; Puerto Rico | Guadalupe Ruiz; Mexico |
| Heavyweight (+67 kg) | Glenhis Hernández; Cuba | Nikki Martínez; Puerto Rico | Lauren Cahoon; United States |

== Tennis ==
| Event | Gold | Silver | Bronze |
|---|---|---|---|
| Men's singles | Robert Farah; Colombia | Rogério Dutra da Silva; Brazil | Víctor Estrella; Dominican Republic |
| Women's singles | Irina Falconi; United States | Monica Puig; Puerto Rico | Christina McHale; United States |
| Men's doubles | Colombia; Juan Sebastián Cabal; Robert Farah | Ecuador; Julio César Campozano; Roberto Quiroz | United States; Nicholas Monroe; Greg Ouelette |
| Women's doubles | Argentina; María Irigoyen; Florencia Molinero | United States; Irina Falconi; Christina McHale | Colombia; Catalina Castaño; Mariana Duque Mariño |
| Mixed doubles | Mexico; Ana Paula de la Peña; Santiago González | Chile; Andrea Koch Benvenuto; Guillermo Rivera Aránguiz | Brazil; Ana Clara Duarte; Rogério Dutra da Silva |

== Triathlon ==
| Event | Gold | Silver | Bronze |
|---|---|---|---|
| Men's individual | Reinaldo Colucci; Brazil | Manuel Huerta; United States | Brent McMahon; Canada |
| Women's individual | Sarah Haskins; United States | Bárbara Riveros Díaz; Chile | Pamella Nascimento; Brazil |

== Volleyball ==
| Event | Gold | Silver | Bronze |
|---|---|---|---|
| Men's tournament | Brazil; Thiago Alves; Mauricio Borges; Eder Carbonera; Mario Da Silva; Mauricio De Souza; Wallace De Souza; Gustavo Endres; Luiz Fonteles; Wallace Martins; Murilo Radke; Bruno Rezende; Renato Russomanno | Cuba; Dariel Albo; Henry Bell; Rolando Cepeda; Yoandry Diaz; Yulian Duran; Yosniel Guillen; Keibel Gutiérrez; Fernando Hernandez; Raydel Hierrezuelo; Wilfredo Leon; Isbel Mesa; Yassel Perdomo | Argentina; Nicolas Bruno; Ivan Castellani; Maximiliano Cavanna; Pablo Crer; Maximiliano Gauna; Mariano Giustiniano; Franco Lopez; Federico Pereyra; Gonzalo Quiroga; Sebastian Sole; Alejandro Toro; Nicolas Uriarte |
| Women's tournament | Brazil; Fabiana Claudino; Juciely Silva; Dani Lins; Paula Pequeno; Thaísa Menezes; Marianne Steinbrecher; Jaqueline Carvalho; Tandara Caixeta; Sheilla Castro; Fabiana de Oliveira; Fernanda Garay; Fabiola Sousa | Cuba; Emily Borrell; Kenia Carcaces; Liannes Castañeda; Ana Yilian Cleger; Rosanna Giel; Daymara Lescay; Yoana Palacios; Alena Rojas; Wilma Salas; Yanelis Santos; Yusidey Silié; Gyselle Silva | United States; Keao Burdine; Angela Forsett; Cynthia Barboza; Alexandra Klineman; Regan Hood; Cassidy Lichtman; Lauren Gibbemeyer; Jessica Jones; Carli Lloyd; Courtney Thompson; Kayla Banwart; Tamari Miyashiro |

== Water polo ==
| Event | Gold | Silver | Bronze |
|---|---|---|---|
| Men's tournament | United States; Merrill Moses; Peter Varellas; Peter Hudnut; Ryan Bailey; Tony Azevedo; Jeff Powers; Layne Beaubien; Adam Wright; Tim Hutten; Jesse Smith; Brian Alexander; J. W. Krumpholz; Chay Lapin | Canada; Dusan Aleksic; Nicholas Bicari; Justin Boyd; John Conway; Dusko Dakic; Devon Diggle; Aaron Feltham; Kevin Graham; Constantine Kudaba; Jared McElroy; Robin Randall; Scott Robinson; Oliver Vikalo | Brazil; Henrique Carvalho; João Coelho; Danilo Correa; Jonas Crivella; Marcelo Das Chagas; Felipe De Costa; Luís Dos Santos; Marcelo Franco; Ruda Franco; Gustavo Guimăres; Bernardo Rocha; Gabriel Rocha; Emilio Vieira |
| Women | United States; Elizabeth Armstrong; Heather Petri; Melissa Seidemann; Brenda Villa; Lauren Wenger; Margaret Steffens; Courtney Mathewson; Jessica Steffens; Elsie Windes; Kelly Rulon; Annika Dries; Kami Craig; Tumuaialii Anae | Canada; Krystina Alogbo; Joëlle Békhazi; Tara Campbell; Emily Csikos; Monika Eggens; Whitney Genoway; Katrina Monton; Dominique Perreault; Marina Radu; Rachel Riddell; Christine Robinson; Rosanna Tomiuk; Anna Yelizarova | Brazil; Tess De Oliveira; Cecilia Canetti; Marina Zablith; Marina Canetti; Catherine De Oliveira; Izabella Chiappini; Cristina Beer; Luiza Carvalho; Fernanda Lissoni; Gabriela Gozani; Mirela Coutinho; Gabriela Dias; Manuela Canetti |

== Water skiing ==
| Event | Gold | Silver | Bronze |
|---|---|---|---|
| Men's overall | Javier Julio; Argentina | Felipe Miranda; Chile | Rodrigo Miranda; Chile |
| Women's overall | Regina Jaquess; United States | Whitney McClintock; Canada | Karen Stevens; Canada |
| Men's tricks | Javier Julio; Argentina | Jason McClintock; Canada | Felipe Miranda; Chile |
| Women's tricks | Whitney McClintock; Canada | Maria Linares; Colombia | Regina Jaquess; United States |
| Men's slalom | Jonathan Travers; United States | Jason McClintock; Canada | Carlos Lamadrid; Mexico |
| Women's slalom | Regina Jaquess; United States | Whitney McClintock; Canada | Karen Stevens; Canada |
| Men's jump | Frederick Krueger IV; United States | Rodrigo Miranda; Chile | Felipe Miranda; Chile |
| Women's jump | Regina Jaquess; United States | Whitney McClintock; Canada | Karen Stevens; Canada |
| Men's wakeboard | Andrew Adkison; United States | Marcelo Giardi^{[B]} Brazil | Alejo de Palma^{[B]} Argentina |

== Weightlifting ==
| Event | Gold | Silver | Bronze |
|---|---|---|---|
| Men's 56 kg | Sergio Álvarez; Cuba | Sergio Rada; Colombia | José Montes; Mexico |
| Men's 62 kg | Óscar Figueroa; Colombia | Jesús López; Venezuela | Diego Salazar; Colombia |
| Men's 69 kg | Israel Rubio; Venezuela | Junior Sanchez; Venezuela | Doyler Sánchez; Colombia |
| Men's 77 kg | Iván Cambar; Cuba | Ricardo Flores; Ecuador | Chad Vaughn; United States |
| Men's 85 kg | Yoelmis Hernández; Cuba | Carlos Andica; Colombia | Kendrick Farris; United States |
| Men's 94 kg | Javier Venega; Cuba | Herbys Márquez; Venezuela | Eduardo Gudamud; Ecuador |
| Men's 105 kg | Jorge Arroyo; Ecuador | Julio Luna; Venezuela | Donald Shankle; United States |
| Men's +105 kg | Fernando Reis; Brazil | Yoel Morales; Venezuela | George Kobaladze; Canada |
| Women's 48 kg | Lely Burgos; Puerto Rico | Betsi Rivas; Venezuela | Katherine Mercado; Colombia |
| Women's 53 kg | Yuderquis Contreras; Dominican Republic | Inmara Henriquez; Venezuela | Francia Peñuñuri; Mexico |
| Women's 58 kg | Maria Escobar; Ecuador | Jackelina Heredia; Colombia | Lina Rivas; Colombia |
| Women's 63 kg | Christine Girard; Canada | Nisida Palomeque; Colombia | Luz Acosta; Mexico |
| Women's 69 kg | Mercedes Pérez; Colombia | Cinthya Dominguez; Mexico | Aremi Fuentes; Mexico |
| Women's 75 kg | Ubaldina Valoyes; Colombia | Maria Valdes; Chile | Maria Alvarez; Venezuela |
| Women's +75 kg | Oliba Nieve; Ecuador | Yaniuska Espinoza; Venezuela | Tania Mascorro; Mexico |

== Wrestling ==
=== Freestyle ===
| Event | Gold | Silver | Bronze |
|---|---|---|---|
| Men's 55 kg | Juan Ramírez Beltré; Dominican Republic | Obenson Blanc; United States | Steven Takahashi; Canada |
| Men's 55 kg | Juan Ramírez Beltré; Dominican Republic | Obenson Blanc; United States | Juan Valverde; Ecuador |
| Men's 60 kg | Franklin Gómez; Puerto Rico | Guillermo Torres; Mexico | Yowlys Bonne; Cuba |
| Men's 60 kg | Franklin Gómez; Puerto Rico | Guillermo Torres; Mexico | Fernando Iglesias; Argentina |
| Men's 66 kg | Liván López; Cuba | Pedro Soto; Puerto Rico | Teyon Ware; United States |
| Men's 66 kg | Liván López; Cuba | Pedro Soto; Puerto Rico | Yoan Blanco; Ecuador |
| Men's 74 kg | Jordan Burroughs; United States | Yunierki Blanco; Cuba | Matt Gentry; Canada |
| Men's 74 kg | Jordan Burroughs; United States | Yunierki Blanco; Cuba | Ricardo Roberty; Venezuela |
| Men's 84 kg | Jacob Herbert; United States | Humberto Arencibia; Cuba | Jeffrey Adamson; Canada |
| Men's 84 kg | Jacob Herbert; United States | Humberto Arencibia; Cuba | Jose Diaz; Venezuela |
| Men's 96 kg | Jacob Varner; United States | Luis Vivenes; Venezuela | Khetag Pliev; Canada |
| Men's 96 kg | Jacob Varner; United States | Luis Vivenes; Venezuela | Juan Martínez; Colombia |
| Men's 120 kg | Tervel Dlagnev; United States | Sunny Dhinsa; Canada | Disney Rodriguez; Cuba |
| Men's 120 kg | Tervel Dlagnev; United States | Sunny Dhinsa; Canada | Carlos Félix; Dominican Republic |
| Women's 48 kg | Carol Huynh; Canada | Clarissa Chun; United States | Patricia Bermúdez; Argentina |
| Women's 48 kg | Carol Huynh; Canada | Clarissa Chun; United States | Carolina Castillo; Colombia |
| Women's 55 kg | Helen Maroulis; United States | Tonya Verbeek; Canada | Joice Da Silva; Brazil |
| Women's 55 kg | Helen Maroulis; United States | Tonya Verbeek; Canada | Lissette Antes; Ecuador |
| Women's 63 kg | Katerina Vidiaux; Cuba | Elena Pirozhkova; United States | Luz Vazquez; Argentina |
| Women's 63 kg | Katerina Vidiaux; Cuba | Elena Pirozhkova; United States | Sandra Roa; Colombia |
| Women's 72 kg | Lisset Hechevarria; Cuba | Aline Ferreira; Brazil | Jaramit Weffer; Venezuela |
| Women's 72 kg | Lisset Hechevarria; Cuba | Aline Ferreira; Brazil | Elsa Sánchez; Dominican Republic |

=== Greco-Roman ===
| Event | Gold | Silver | Bronze |
|---|---|---|---|
| 55 kg | Gustavo Balart; Cuba | Jorge Cardozo; Venezuela | Juan Carlos Lopez; Colombia |
| 55 kg | Gustavo Balart; Cuba | Jorge Cardozo; Venezuela | Francisco Encarnacion; Dominican Republic |
| 60 kg | Luis Liendo; Venezuela | Joseph Betterman; United States | Hanser Meoque; Cuba |
| 60 kg | Luis Liendo; Venezuela | Joseph Betterman; United States | Jansel Ramírez; Dominican Republic |
| 66 kg | Pedro Mullens; Cuba | Anyelo Mota; Dominican Republic | Ulises Barragan; Mexico |
| 66 kg | Pedro Mullens; Cuba | Anyelo Mota; Dominican Republic | Glenn Garrison; United States |
| 74 kg | Jorgisbell Alvarez; Cuba | Benjamin Provisor; United States | Juan Escobar; Mexico |
| 74 kg | Jorgisbell Alvarez; Cuba | Benjamin Provisor; United States | Hansel Martinez; Dominican Republic |
| 84 kg | Pablo Shorey; Cuba | Cristhian Mosquera; Colombia | José Arias; Dominican Republic |
| 84 kg | Pablo Shorey; Cuba | Cristhian Mosquera; Colombia | Yorgen Cova; Venezuela |
| 96 kg | Yunior Estrada; Cuba | Raul Anguilo; Colombia | Erwin Caraballo; Venezuela |
| 96 kg | Yunior Estrada; Cuba | Raul Anguilo; Colombia | Yuri Maier; Argentina |
| 120 kg | Mijaín López; Cuba | Rafael Barreno; Venezuela | Ramón García; Dominican Republic |
| 120 kg | Mijaín López; Cuba | Rafael Barreno; Venezuela | Victor Asprilla; Colombia |

== Medal winner changes ==
A. Venezuelan athlete Víctor Castillo had tested positive for the banned substance methylhexaneamine and was stripped of his gold medal he won in the men's long jump event. After Castillo was disqualified, the gold medal went to Daniel Pineda of Chile, the silver medal went to David Registe of Dominica, and the bronze medal to Jeremy Hicks of United States.

B. Canadian wakeboarder Aaron Rathy had tested positive for the banned substance methylhexaneamine and was stripped of his silver medal he won in the men's wakeboard event. After Rathy was disqualified, the silver medal went to Marcelo Giardi of Brazil, and the bronze medal to Alejo de Palma of Argentina.

== Statistics ==
=== Medal leaders ===
Athletes that won at least three gold medals or at least four total medals will be listed below.

| Athlete | Nation | Sport | Gold | Silver | Bronze | Total |
|---|---|---|---|---|---|---|
| Thiago Pereira | Brazil | Swimming | 6 | 1 | 1 | 8 |
| Elizabeth Pelton | United States | Swimming | 4 | 1 | 0 | 5 |
| César Cielo | Brazil | Swimming | 4 | 0 | 0 | 4 |
| Amanda Kendall | United States | Swimming | 4 | 0 | 0 | 4 |
| Erika Erndl | United States | Swimming | 3 | 1 | 0 | 4 |
| Julie Zetlin | United States | Gymnastics | 3 | 1 | 0 | 4 |
| Paola Espinosa | Mexico | Diving | 3 | 0 | 1 | 4 |
| Regina Jacquess | United States | Water skiing | 3 | 0 | 1 | 4 |
| Dayane Amaral | Brazil | Gymnastics | 3 | 0 | 0 | 3 |
| Bridgette Caquatto | United States | Gymnastics | 3 | 0 | 0 | 3 |
| Drielly Daltoe | Brazil | Gymnastics | 3 | 0 | 0 | 3 |
| Debora Falda | Brazil | Gymnastics | 3 | 0 | 0 | 3 |
| Diego Hypólito | Brazil | Gymnastics | 3 | 0 | 0 | 3 |
| Paola Longoria | Mexico | Racquetball | 3 | 0 | 0 | 3 |
| Luisa Matsuo | Brazil | Gymnastics | 3 | 0 | 0 | 3 |
| Bianca Mendonça | Brazil | Gymnastics | 3 | 0 | 0 | 3 |
| Eliane Sampaio | Brazil | Gymnastics | 3 | 0 | 0 | 3 |
| Cynthia Valdez | Mexico | Gymnastics | 2 | 3 | 0 | 5 |
| Whitney McClintock | Canada | Water skiing | 1 | 3 | 0 | 4 |
| Conor Dwyer | United States | Swimming | 1 | 3 | 0 | 4 |
