= Gymnastics at the 2011 Pan American Games – Women's rhythmic group all-around =

Women's rhythmic group all-around at the 2011 Pan American Games
- Venue: Nissan Gymnastics Stadium
- Dates: October 16
- Competitors: 30 from 5 nations

Medalists
Gold medal	Dayane Amaral; Debora Falda; Luisa Matsuo; Bianca Mendonça; Eliane Sampaio; Drielly Daltoe	Brazil
Silver medal	Katrina Cameron; Rose Cossar; Alexandra Landry; Anastasiya Muntyanu; Anjelika Reznik; Kelsey Titmarsh	Canada
Bronze medal	Maydelis Delgado; Zenia Fernandez; Lianet Jose; Martha Perez; Yeney Renovales; Legna Savon	Cuba

The group all-around competition of the rhythmic gymnastics events at the 2011 Pan American Games was held on October 16 at the Nissan Gymnastics Stadium. The draw for the competition took place on August 1, 2011 in Guadalajara. The defending Pan American Games champion was team Brazil.

== Schedule ==
All times are Central Standard Time (UTC-6).

Date	Time	Round
October 16, 2011	16:00	5 Balls
October 16, 2011	17:00	3 Ribbons/2 Hoops

== Results ==
Place	Nation	5	3 + 2	Total
1st place, gold medalist(s)	Brazil; Dayane Amaral; Debora Falda; Luisa Matsuo; Bianca Mendonça; Eliane Sampaio; Drielly Daltoe	25.100 (1)	23.475 (3)	48.575
2nd place, silver medalist(s)	Canada; Katrina Cameron; Rose Cossar; Alexandra Landry; Anastasiya Muntyanu; Anjelika Reznik; Kelsey Titmarsh	24.450 (2)	23.500 (2)	47.950
3rd place, bronze medalist(s)	Cuba; Maydelis Delgado; Zenia Fernandez; Lianet Jose; Martha Perez; Yeney Renovales; Legna Savon	23.600 (4)	23.575 (1)	47.175
4	United States; Jessica Bogdanov; Megan Frohlich; Aimee Gupta; Michelle Przybylo; Sofya Roytburg; Sydney Sachs	23.600 (3)	23.225 (4)	46.825
5	Venezuela; Grisbel Lopez; Leiyineth Medrano; Andrea Myerston; Michelle Sanchez; Neira Segura; Nathalia Silva	22.500 (5)	20.725 (5)	43.225
