= Gymnastics at the 2011 Pan American Games – Women's rhythmic group 5 balls =

Women's rhythmic group 5 balls at the 2011 Pan American Games
- Venue: Nissan Gymnastics Stadium
- Dates: October 17
- Competitors: 30 from 5 nations

Medalists
Gold medal	Dayane Amaral; Debora Falda; Luisa Matsuo; Bianca Mendonça; Eliane Sampaio; Drielly Daltoe	Brazil
Silver medal	Jessica Bogdanov; Megan Frohlich; Aimee Gupta; Michelle Przybylo; Sofya Roytburg	United States
Bronze medal	Katrina Cameron; Rose Cossar; Alexandra Landry; Anastasiya Muntyanu; Anjelika Reznik; Kelsey Titmarsh	Canada

The women's rhythmic group 5 balls competition of the rhythmic gymnastics events at the 2011 Pan American Games was held on October 17 at the Nissan Gymnastics Stadium. The draw for the competition took place on August 1, 2011, in Guadalajara. The defending Pan American Games champion was team Brazil.

== Schedule ==
All times are Central Standard Time (UTC-6).

Date	Time	Round
October 17, 2011	19:10	Finals

== Results ==
Place	Nation	Ball (rhythmic gymnastics)
1st place, gold medalist(s)	Brazil; Dayane Amaral; Debora Falda; Luisa Matsuo; Bianca Mendonça; Eliane Sampaio; Drielly Daltoe	25.050
2nd place, silver medalist(s)	United States; Jessica Bogdanov; Megan Frohlich; Aimee Gupta; Michelle Przybylo; Sofya Roytburg; Sydney Sachs	24.850
3rd place, bronze medalist(s)	Canada; Katrina Cameron; Rose Cossar; Alexandra Landry; Anastasiya Muntyanu; Anjelika Reznik; Kelsey Titmarsh	24.625
4	Cuba; Maydelis Delgado; Zenia Fernandez; Lianet Jose; Martha Perez; Yeney Renovales; Legna Savon	24.425
5	Venezuela; Grisbel Lopez; Leiyineth Medrano; Andrea Myerston; Michelle Sanchez; Neira Segura; Nathalia Silva	22.250
