= Kelsey Titmarsh =

Canadian rhythmic gymnast

- Born: December 27, 1993 (age 32) North York, Ontario, Canada
- Height: 173 cm (5 ft 8 in)

Gymnastics career
- Discipline: Rhythmic gymnastics
- Country represented: Canada
- Club: Trillium RSG
- Head coach: Tatsiana Kastsenkava
- Choreographer: Tatsiana Kastsenkava
Medal record
Women's Rhythmic gymnastics
Representing Canada
Pan American Games
Silver medal – second place	2011 Guadalajara	Group All-Around
Silver medal – second place	2011 Guadalajara	Group 3 Ribbons + 2 Hoops
Bronze medal – third place	2011 Guadalajara	Group 5 Balls

Kelsey Titmarsh (born 27 December 1993) is a Canadian rhythmic gymnast, who competed in the group all-around at the 2012 Olympic Games in London. She is a member of Trillium Rhythmics formally Kalev Rhythmic Gymnastics Club in Vaughan, coached by Svetlana Joukova. She became a member of the Canadian national team in 2005, and senior national athlete in 2009.

== Biography ==
Born in North York, Ontario, she now lives in Thornhill, Ontario. Titmarsh attended Thornlea Secondary School.

Following a friend, Titmarsh began taking rhythmic gymnastics lessons at age seven. After being noticed by her coach, she continued. In 2005, she joined the junior national team.

Around 2008, four years before the London Olympics, the group was assembled. Led by Rose Cossar, the team included Titmarsh, Alexandra Landry, Katrina Cameron, Anjelika Reznik, and Anastasiya Muntyanu. In 2010, the team competed at international competitions in Spain, France, Belarus, Mexico, Russia and Italy. The group placed 14th of 29 for the groups all-around category at the 2010 World Rhythmic Gymnastics Championships in Moscow, scoring 46.025. The event was a pre-qualifier for the Olympics.

In September 2011, the World Rhythmic Gymnastics Championships in Montpellier, France were the first qualifying event for the Olympics. Canada placed 17th with a score of 48.950. As the top-ranking group from the Americas, the Canadian group won an Olympic quota. The team attended the 2011 Pan American Games in Guadalajara, Mexico that October. As part of the Canadian team, Titmarsh earned silver in the all-around event, scoring 47.950; bronze in the group 5 ball event, scoring 24.625; and silver in the team event with 3 ribbons and 2 hoops, scoring 24.650.

On June 29, 2012, Canadian Olympic Committee immediate past-president Michael Chambers held a press conference in Ottawa, welcoming the country's gymnasts to the Olympic team. The event highlighted the rhythmic gymnastics group. London 2012 was the first time a Canadian rhythmic gymnastic group had qualified for the Olympics. The group appeared in London for the annual Canada Day celebration in Trafalgar Square, appearing with Christopher Overholt and Canadian High Commissioner for Canada to the United Kingdom Gordon Campbell.

At the Olympics, the group finished in 11th place.

Titmarsh and her group won the Elite Canada and Group Championships senior group national title in 2008, 2009, 2010, and 2011.

== See also ==
- Gymnastics at the 2012 Summer Olympics
