= Gymnastics at the 2011 Pan American Games =

- Gymnastics pictograms
- Venue: Complejo Nissan de Gimnasia
- Start date: October 16, 2011
- End date: October 29, 2011
- No. of events: 24 (9 men, 15 women)
- Competitors: 176 from 19 nations

At the 2011 Pan American Games in Guadalajara, three different gymnastics disciplines were contested: artistic gymnastics, rhythmic gymnastics and trampoline. The artistic gymnastics events were held on October 24–29. The rhythmic gymnastics events were held on October 21–24. The trampoline events were held on October 16–19. All three events were held at the Nissan Gymnastics Stadium.

== Medal summary ==
=== Medal table ===
* Host nation (Mexico)

Rank	Nation	Gold	Silver	Bronze	Total
1	United States	9	5	4	18
2	Brazil	6	3	5	14
3	Mexico*	5	4	4	13
4	Canada	2	5	4	11
5	Colombia	1	4	2	7
6	Guatemala	1	1	0	2
7	Puerto Rico	0	2	2	4
8	Chile	0	2	1	3
9	Argentina	0	0	1	1
9	Cuba	0	0	1	1
Totals (10 entries)		24	26	24	74

=== Artistic gymnastics ===
==== Men ====
Games	Gold	Silver	Bronze
Team all-around	Brazil; Petrix Barbosa; Francisco Barreto Júnior; Diego Hypólito; Sérgio Sasaki; Pericles Silva; Arthur Zanetti	Puerto Rico; Rafael Morales; Angel Ramos; Tommy Ramos; Luis Rivera; Alexander Rodríguez; Luis Vargas	United States; Donothan Bailey; Christopher Maestas; Tyler Mizoguchi; Sho Nakamori; Paul Ruggeri; Brandon Wynn
Individual all-around	Jossimar Calvo; Colombia	Jorge Hugo Giraldo; Colombia	Tomás González; Chile
Floor exercise	Diego Hypólito; Brazil	Tomás González; Chile	Alexander Rodríguez; Puerto Rico
Pommel horse	Daniel Corral; Mexico	Jorge Hugo Giraldo; Colombia	Jorge Pena; Colombia
Rings	Brandon Wynn; United States	Arthur Zanetti; Brazil	Christopher Maestas; United States
Vault	Diego Hypólito; Brazil	Tomás González; Chile	Hugh Smith; Canada
Parallel bars	Daniel Corral; Mexico	Jorge Hugo Giraldo; Colombia Luis Vargas; Puerto Rico Paul Ruggeri; United States	—
Horizontal bar	Paul Ruggeri; United States	Jossimar Calvo; Colombia	Angel Ramos; Puerto Rico

==== Women ====
Event	Gold	Silver	Bronze
Team all-around	United States; Bridgette Caquatto; Jessie DeZiel; Brandie Jay; Shawn Johnson; Grace McLaughlin; Bridget Sloan	Canada; Kristina Vaculik; Christine Peng-Peng Lee; Coralie Leblond-Chartrand; Mikaela Gerber; Dominique Pegg; Talia Chiarelli	Mexico; Elsa García; Marisela Cantú; Ana Lago; Karla Salazar; Yessenia Estrada; Alexa Moreno
Individual all-around	Bridgette Caquatto; United States	Ana Sofia Gomez; Guatemala	Kristina Vaculik; Canada
Vault	Brandie Jay; United States	Elsa García; Mexico	Catalina Escobar; Colombia
Uneven bars	Bridgette Caquatto; United States	Shawn Johnson; United States	Elsa García; Mexico
Uneven bars	Bridgette Caquatto; United States	Shawn Johnson; United States	Marisela Cantú; Mexico
Balance beam	Ana Sofia Gomez; Guatemala	Kristina Vaculik; Canada	Daniele Hypólito; Brazil
Floor exercise	Ana Lago; Mexico	Mikaela Gerber; Canada	Daniele Hypólito; Brazil

=== Rhythmic gymnastics ===
==== Individual ====
Event	Gold	Silver	Bronze
Individual all-around	Julie Zetlin; United States	Cynthia Valdez; Mexico	Angélica Kvieczynski; Brazil
Ball	Julie Zetlin; United States	Cynthia Valdez; Mexico	Angélica Kvieczynski; Brazil
Club	Cynthia Valdez; Mexico	Angélica Kvieczynski; Brazil	Mariam Chamilova; Canada
Hoop	Cynthia Valdez; Mexico	Julie Zetlin; United States	Angélica Kvieczynski; Brazil
Ribbon	Julie Zetlin; United States	Cynthia Valdez; Mexico	Ana Carrasco Pini; Argentina

==== Group ====
Event	Gold	Silver	Bronze
Group all-around	Brazil; Dayane Amaral; Débora Falda; Luisa Matsuo; Bianca Mendonça; Eliane Sampaio; Drielly Daltoe	Canada; Katrina Cameron; Rose Cossar; Alexandra Landry; Anastasiya Muntyanu; Anjelika Reznik; Kelsey Titmarsh	Cuba; Maydelis Delgado; Zenia Fernandez; Lianet Jose; Martha Perez; Yeney Renovales; Legna Savon
5 balls	Brazil; Dayane Amaral; Debora Falda; Luisa Matsuo; Bianca Mendonça; Eliane Sampaio; Drielly Daltoe	United States; Jessica Bogdanov; Megan Frohlich; Aimee Gupta; Michelle Przybylo; Sofya Roytburg; Sydney Sachs	Canada; Katrina Cameron; Rose Cossar; Alexandra Landry; Anastasiya Muntyanu; Anjelika Reznik; Kelsey Titmarsh
3 ribbons + 2 hoops	Brazil; Dayane Amaral; Débora Falda; Luisa Matsuo; Bianca Mendonça; Eliane Sampaio; Drielly Daltoe	Canada; Katrina Cameron; Rose Cossar; Alexandra Landry; Anastasiya Muntyanu; Anjelika Reznik; Kelsey Titmarsh	United States; Jessica Bogdanov; Megan Frohlich; Aimee Gupta; Michelle Przybylo; Sofya Roytburg; Sydney Sachs

=== Trampoline ===
Event	Gold	Silver	Bronze
Men's individual	Keegan Soehn; Canada	Rafael Andrade; Brazil	José Alberto Vargas; Mexico
Women's individual	Rosannagh MacLennan; Canada	Dakota Earnest; United States	Alaina Williams; United States

== Schedule ==
All times are Central Daylight Time (UTC-5).

Day	Date	Start	Finish	Event	Phase
Day 2	Saturday October 15, 2011	16:00	19:45	Women's rhythmic apparatuses	Qualification
Day 2	Saturday October 15, 2011	16:00	19:45	Women's rhythmic individual all-around	Finals
Day 3	Sunday October 16, 2011	16:00	17:30	Women's rhythmic group all-around	Finals
Day 4	Monday October 17, 2011	17:00	19:45	Women's rhythmic individual ball and hoop	Finals
Day 4	Monday October 17, 2011	19:00	19:45	Women's rhythmic group 5 balls	Finals
Day 5	Tuesday October 18, 2011	16:00	17:05	Women's rhythmic individual club and ribbon	Finals
Day 5	Tuesday October 18, 2011	17:15	17:55	Men's/Women's individual trampoline	Finals
Day 5	Tuesday October 18, 2011	18:00	18:20	Women's rhythmic group 3 ribbons + 2 hoops	Finals
Day 11	Monday October 24, 2011	13:00	19:00	Women's artistic apparatuses	Qualification
Day 11	Monday October 24, 2011	13:00	19:00	Women's artistic team all-around	Finals
Day 12	Tuesday October 25, 2011	13:00	19:00	Men's artistic apparatuses	Qualification
Day 12	Tuesday October 25, 2011	13:00	19:00	Men's artistic team all-around	Finals
Day 13	Wednesday October 26, 2011	13:00	15:15	Women's artistic individual all-around	Finals
Day 13	Wednesday October 26, 2011	17:30	20:15	Men's artistic individual all-around	Finals
Day 14	Thursday October 27, 2011	13:00	13:30	Men's artistic individual floor	Finals
Day 14	Thursday October 27, 2011	13:40	14:10	Men's artistic individual pommel horse/Women's vault	Finals
Day 14	Thursday October 27, 2011	15:00	15:30	Men's artistic individual rings/Women's uneven bars	Finals
Day 15	Friday October 28, 2011	13:00	13:30	Men's artistic individual vault/Women's balance beam	Finals
Day 15	Friday October 28, 2011	14:10	14:40	Men's artistic individual parallel bars/Women's floor	Finals
Day 15	Friday October 28, 2011	14:40	15:10	Men's artistic individual horizontal bars	Finals

== Qualification ==
Nation	Artistic (Note: Artistic Gymnastics, NOCs with 6 entered athletes may also enter the team competition.)		Rhythmic		Trampoline		Total
Nation	Men	Women	Individual	Group	Men	Women	Total
Argentina	6	2	2				10
Bolivia		1					1
Brazil	6	6	2	6	2	2	24
Canada	6	6	2	6	2	2	24
Chile	2	2	1				5
Colombia	6	6	1				13
Costa Rica	1	1					2
Cuba	2	6	2	6	1		17
Dominican Republic	1	1					2
Ecuador	2	2					4
El Salvador	1						1
Guatemala	1	1	1				3
Mexico	6	6	1		1	1	15
Peru	2	1					3
Puerto Rico	6	2				1	9
Trinidad and Tobago	1	1					2
United States	6	6	2	6	2	2	24
Uruguay		1					1
Venezuela	2	6	2	6			16
Total: 19 NOCs	57	57	16	30	8	8	176

== See also ==
- Pan American Gymnastics Championships
- South American Gymnastics Championships
- Gymnastics at the 2012 Summer Olympics
