= Taylor Hoagland =

American softball player

Personal information
- Born: 1991 (age 34–35) Lewisville, Texas, U.S.
- Height: 5 ft 7 in (1.70 m)

Sport
- Country: USA
- Sport: Softball
- College team: Texas Longhorns

Taylor Hoagland (born 1991) is an American, former collegiate All-American, right-handed hitting softball player originally from Flower Mound, Texas. She attended Flower Mound High School and later attended the University of Texas at Austin, where she was a third baseman for the Texas Longhorns softball team. She owns Texas softball's longest hitting streak, and is the program's all-time leader in home runs. In her senior year, Hoagland led Texas softball to a berth in the 2013 Women's College World Series semifinals, where they lost to Tennessee, 2–0. Hoagland later went on to represent the United States internationally, playing on the United States women's national softball team.

== Statistics ==
=== Texas Longhorns ===
YEAR	G	AB	R	H	BA	RBI	HR	3B	2B	TB	SLG	BB	SO	SB	SBA
2010	58	170	41	65	.382	29	11	1	10	110	.647%	22	32	17	22
2011	56	161	54	54	.335	36	15	3	9	114	.708%	42	45	24	31
2012	60	178	59	58	.326	39	18	0	7	119	.668%	41	40	18	21
2013	61	151	67	64	.424	45	14	2	14	124	.821%	73	26	29	36
TOTALS	235	660	221	241	.365	149	58	6	40	467	.707%	178	143	88	110
