= Anastasiya Muntyanu =

Canadian rhythmic gymnast

- Born: 13 October 1994 (age 31) Chernivtsi, Ukraine
- Height: 172 cm (5 ft 8 in)

Gymnastics career
- Discipline: Rhythmic gymnastics
- Country represented: Canada (2011–2012)
- Training location: Toronto, Canada
- Club: Kalev Rhythmic Gymnastic Centre
- Head coach: Svetlana Joukova
Medal record
Rhythmic gymnastics
Representing Canada
Pan American Games
Silver medal – second place	2011 Guadalajara	Group All-around
Silver medal – second place	2011 Guadalajara	3 Ribbons + 2 Hoops
Bronze medal – third place	2011 Guadalajara	5 Balls
Pan American Championships
Bronze medal – third place	2010 Guadalajara	Team

Anastasiya Muntyanu (Romanian: Anastasia Munteanu; born 13 October 1994) is a Ukrainian-born Canadian dermatologist and former group rhythmic gymnast. She competed with the Canadian group that placed 11th at the 2012 Summer Olympics, and she won three medals at the 2011 Pan American Games.

== Gymnastics career ==
Muntyanu began rhythmic gymnastics at the age of three. She competed as an individual at the 2010 Pan American Championships and won a bronze medal in the team event. (Note: The Canadian team initially placed fourth but received the bronze medal after Mexico lost the gold medal due to Rut Castillo testing positive for sibutramine.)

At the 2011 World Championships, Muntyanu helped Canada place 17th in the group all-around. As the highest-placing group from the Americas, Canada earned its first-ever Olympic berth in group rhythmic gymnastics. After the World Championships, they competed at the 2011 Pan American Games and won the all-around silver medal behind Brazil. They won another silver medal in the 3 ribbons and 2 hoops final, and they won the bronze medal in the 5 balls final.

Muntyanu was selected to represent Canada at the 2020 Summer Olympics alongside Alexandra Landry, Katrina Cameron, Rose Cossar, Anjelika Reznik and Kelsey Titmarsh. The group finished 11th in the qualifications and did not advance into the final.

== Medical career ==
After retiring from gymnastics, Muntyanu was inspired to become a doctor by the knee injuries she dealt with. She graduated from the University of Ottawa Faculty of Medicine and completed a residency in dermatology at the University of Toronto. She worked at the McGill University Health Centre, where she completed a PhD in Experimental Medicine. She practices at the Canadian Dermatology Centre in Toronto and has published dermatology research, including in the Journal of the American Academy of Dermatology.
