= Eliane Sampaio =

Brazilian rhythmic gymnast

Eliane Rosa Sampaio
- Born: 11 May 1992 (age 34)

Gymnastics career
- Discipline: Rhythmic gymnastics
- Country represented: Brazil (2009-2014 (?))
- Head coach: Camila Ferezin
Medal record
Representing Brazil
Rhythmic gymnastics
Event	1st	2nd	3rd
FIG World Cup	0	0	1
Total	0	0	1
Pan American Games
Gold medal – first place	2011 Guadalajara	Group all-around
Gold medal – first place	2011 Guadalajara	5 balls
Gold medal – first place	2011 Guadalajara	3 ribbons + 2 hoops
Pan American Championships
Gold medal – first place	2014 Mississauga	Group all-around
Gold medal – first place	2014 Mississauga	10 clubs
Gold medal – first place	2014 Mississauga	3 balls + 2 ribbons
Silver medal – second place	2010 Guadalajara	Team
Silver medal – second place	2010 Guadalajara	Rope
South American Games
Gold medal – first place	2010 Medellín	Team
Silver medal – second place	2010 Medellín	Rope
South American Championships
Gold medal – first place	2011 Maracaibo	Group all-around
Gold medal – first place	2011 Maracaibo	5 balls
Gold medal – first place	2011 Maracaibo	3 ribbons + 2 hoops
Gold medal – first place	2012 Cali	Group all-around
Gold medal – first place	2012 Cali	5 balls
Gold medal – first place	2012 Cali	3 ribbons + 2 hoops

Eliane Rosa Sampaio (born 11 May 1992) is a Brazilian individual rhythmic gymnast. She represents her nation at international competitions. She competed at world championships, including at the 2009, 2010, 2011 and 2014 World Rhythmic Gymnastics Championships.

In 2013, Eliane Sampaio and the other members of the Brazilian group — Beatriz Pomini, Bianca Mendonça, Debora Falda, Francielly Pereira and Gabrielle Silva — earned the bronze medal on the 3 balls + 2 ribbons routine at the Minsk stage of the 2013 Rhythmic Gymnastics World Cup Series. This was not only Brazil's but also Latin America's first medal at the Rhythmic Gymnastics World Cup series, and only the second time a country from the Americas earned a medal at the World Cup, after Canada's Mary Fuzesi earned the bronze medal on ribbon at the 1990 FIG World Cup Final.
