= Rose Cossar =

Canadian rhythmic gymnast (born 1991)

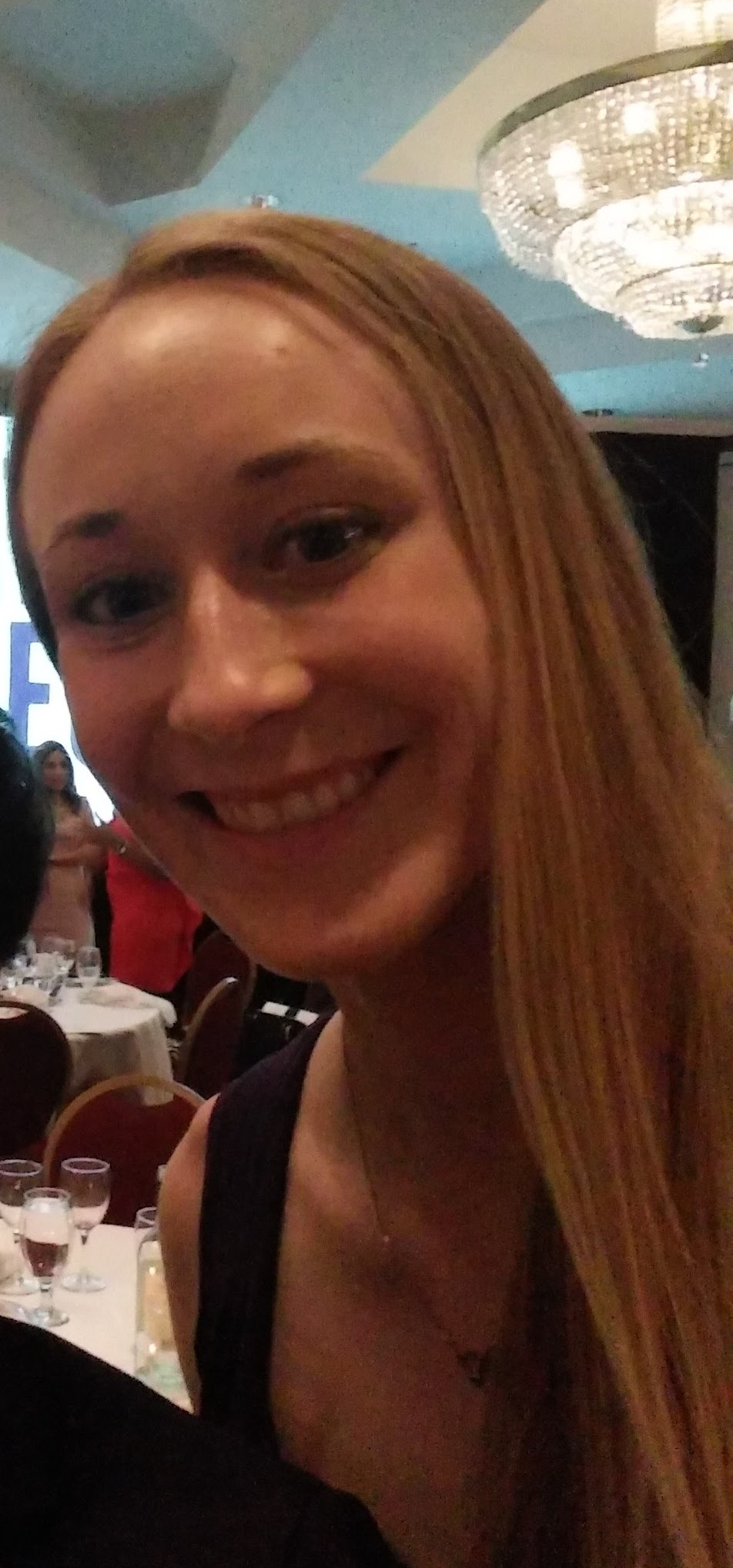
- Rose Cossar in 2016

Personal information
- Born: July 4, 1991 (age 35)
- Height: 173 cm (5 ft 8 in)

Gymnastics career
- Discipline: Rhythmic gymnastics
- Country represented: Canada
Medal record
Women's Rhythmic gymnastics
Representing Canada
Pan American Games
Silver medal – second place	2011 Guadalajara	Group All-Around
Silver medal – second place	2011 Guadalajara	Group 3 Ribbons + 2 Hoops
Bronze medal – third place	2011 Guadalajara	Group 5 Balls

Rose Cossar (born July 4, 1991), also known as Rosie, is a Canadian retired group rhythmic gymnast. She won three medals at the 2011 Pan American Games and was a member of Canada's first group to compete at the Olympics in 2012.

== Background ==
Cossar was born in Southampton, England and raised in Toronto, Canada. She speaks Russian in addition to English. She has four sisters. She attended high school at École secondaire Étienne-Brûlé. Cossar studied nursing and then paramedicine.

== Competitive career ==
Coassar began rhythmic gymnastics in 1996 when she was five years old, after attending a class with her older sister. Five years later, she competed internationally for the first time at the 2001 Happy Cup in Belgium. She placed 8th and received a gift basket as one of the top eight competitors; Cossar later described this moment as exciting and highly motivating.

In 2008, Cossar became team leader of the senior Canadian group, which also included Katrina Cameron, Kelsey Titmarsh, Alexandra Landry, Anastasiya Muntyanu and Anjelika Reznik.

In 2009, Cossar competed at her first World Championships, where the group placed 15th.

The next year, the group finished 14th at the 2010 World Championships. At the Pan American Championships, held in December, the Canadian group won all three available gold medals.

At the World Championships in September 2011, the group placed 17th and earned Canada's first-ever Olympic berth in the group event. At the Pan American Games in October, the group won silver in the all-around and with their 3 ribbons + 2 hoops routines, as well as bronze with their 5 balls routine. Cossar noted that the group had much to work on before the upcoming Olympics, but that "I think it's just going to bring us closer together."

At the 2012 Olympics, the team placed 11th in the rhythmic group all-around. They finished their 5 balls routine in last place after making a mistake during their performance. Cossar expressed disappointment, saying, "We know what we can do and that was not what we should have done," and noting that the group had not done well when they performed apparatus exchanges. The group moved up a place after their second routine, but they did not qualify to the final round.

Cossar retired from gymnastics after the Olympics.

== Post-competitive career ==
In December 2014, Cossar publicly came out as lesbian. She had already been out to her teammates for several years, but she had not previously spoken to the media about her sexuality. Cossar said that she had heard homophobic remarks while involved in the sport, and that unlike her teammates, she had not enjoyed wearing dresses or "getting dolled up".

Cossar hid her sexuality for much of her career, which affected her ability to perform consistently in practice. During the last few years she competed, she began coming out to her teammates, who had noticed her struggling mentally and suggested she had bipolar disorder. Cossar said she worried that they would reject her or that she would jeopardize her place in the group but felt like she could no longer hide her sexuality. Her teammates were supportive, which helped Cossar perform with greater confidence, though her coach was not. In a 2018 talk, she said the uniquely female-only and aesthetically focused environment of rhythmic gymnastics created pressure to act in a traditionally feminine way: "There is this idea in rhythmic gymnastics about what it means to be a woman, and it’s kind of this one image of ‘woman."

Since the 2012 Olympics, she has worked with Toronto's The 519 Church Street Community Centre on the creation of Pride House Toronto, a resource house for LGBT athletes prepared for the 2015 Pan American Games, and is a spokesperson for the Canadian Olympic Committee in its program to combat homophobia in sports. Cossar also works as a paramedic in the Toronto area.

In 2022, Cossar was one of over 70 current and former Canadian gymnasts to sign a letter asking Sport Canada to investigate Gymnastics Canada. Cossar said she hoped the letter would lead to more attention on the issue of sexual abuse in sports. She said of her own experience in the sport, "It took me years to realize that a lot of the things that were happening were not OK. I did the sport for 16 years, probably the last six years of my career is when I started reporting things. The first 10 years, I was just in the thick of it." She recalled one incident when a practice was scheduled to last five hours, but it was extended to the point Cossar's teammates began to collapse from exhaustion while their coach demanded they continue. When Cossar said the team would go pack for their flight, the coach reacted with anger and left the team to make their flight on their own. She also alleged undergoing verbal abuse and witnessing it against her teammates.

Cossar said that while Gymnastics Canada officials were sympathetic to her reports, no action was taken. She gave as an example that several months before the Olympics, the group had asked that the head coach, Svetlana Zhukova, would not accompany them at competitions, and that another coach would be given accreditation instead; they signed a written document to this effect. However, Cossar said that at the Olympics, she saw Zhukova being given accreditation and complained to Gymnastics Canada officials. After an argument, 20 minutes before the group was to perform, they were asked again who they wanted to accompany them into the competition area, to which Cossar replied that their decision had not changed.
