= Luisa Matsuo =

Brazilian rhythmic gymnast

- Full name: Luisa Harumi Matsuo
- Born: 8 August 1988 (age 38) Florianópolis, Santa Catarina

Gymnastics career
- Discipline: Rhythmic gymnastics
- Country represented: Brazil (2005-2011 (?))
- Head coach: Camila Ferezin
Medal record
Pan American Games
Gold medal – first place	2007 Rio de Janeiro	Group all-around
Gold medal – first place	2007 Rio de Janeiro	5 ropes
Gold medal – first place	2007 Rio de Janeiro	3 hoops + 4 clubs
Gold medal – first place	2011 Guadalajara	Group all-around
Gold medal – first place	2011 Guadalajara	5 balls
Gold medal – first place	2011 Guadalajara	3 ribbons + 2 hoops
Pan American Championships
Silver medal – second place	2005 Rio de Janeiro	Team
Silver medal – second place	2010 Guadalajara	Group all-around
South American Games
Gold medal – first place	2010 Medellín	Group all-around
Silver medal – second place	2006 Buenos Aires	Team
Silver medal – second place	2010 Medellín	5 hoops
Silver medal – second place	2010 Medellín	3 ribbons + 2 ropes
South American Championships
Gold medal – first place	2011 Maracaibo	Group all-around
Gold medal – first place	2011 Maracaibo	5 balls
Gold medal – first place	2011 Maracaibo	3 ribbons + 2 hoops

Luisa Harumi Matsuo (born 8 August 1988) is a Brazilian former group rhythmic gymnast. She also represented her nation at international competitions.

She participated at the 2008 Summer Olympics. She competed at world championships, including at the 2011 World Rhythmic Gymnastics Championships.

== See also ==
- List of Olympic rhythmic gymnasts for Brazil
