= Katrina Cameron =

Canadian rhythmic gymnast

- Born: 9 May 1995 (age 31) Mississauga, Ontario, Canada
- Height: 157 cm (5 ft 2 in)

Gymnastics career
- Discipline: Rhythmic gymnastics
- Country represented: Canada (2007–2016)
- Retired: 2016
Medal record
Rhythmic gymnastics
Representing Canada
Pan American Games
Silver medal – second place	2011 Guadalajara	Group all-around
Silver medal – second place	2011 Guadalajara	3 ribbons + 2 hoops
Bronze medal – third place	2011 Guadalajara	5 balls
Bronze medal – third place	2015 Toronto	5 ribbons
Bronze medal – third place	2015 Toronto	6 clubs + 2 hoops
Pan American Championships
Silver medal – second place	2014 Mississauga	10 clubs
Bronze medal – third place	2014 Mississauga	3 balls + 2 ribbons
Youth Olympic Games
Bronze medal – third place	2010 Singapore	Group all-around

Katrina Cameron (born 9 May 1995) is a Canadian retired group rhythmic gymnast. She competed at the 2012 Summer Olympics and won bronze in the all-around at the 2010 Summer Youth Olympics. Between the 2011 and 2015 Pan American Games, she won a total of five medals with the Canadian group.

== Career ==
Cameron began both artistic and rhythmic gymnastics at 4 years old. She started focusing on rhythmic because she was flexible and liked the leotards worn by rhythmic gymnasts. At age ten, she attended a training camp in Russia that lasted over a month, which she attributed with helping her to learn independence.

In 2009, Cameron competed in the junior group at the 2009 Junior Pan American Championships. The group won the all-around, which qualified them to compete at the 2010 Summer Youth Olympics.

The next year, in May, she competed as an individual at the 2010 Pacific Rim Championships. With her teammates, she won bronze in the team competition. In August, she competed at the first-ever Youth Olympics as a group member; the Canadian group rose from 4th after qualifications to win the bronze medal.

In 2011, she became a member of the senior group. At the 2011 Pan American Games, Cameron and the other members of the group won silver in the all-around. In the event finals, they won a second silver in the 3 ribbons + 2 balls final and bronze in the 5 balls final. Heading into the 2011 World Championships, the group aimed to qualify for the 2012 Summer Olympics. They placed 17th in the all-around, and as the top-ranked team from the Americas, qualified a berth at the upcoming Olympics. This was the first time Canada had qualified a group for the Olympics.

At the Olympics, during the qualification round, the Canadian group finished their 5 balls routine in last place after making a mistake during their performance. They moved up a place after their second routine but did not qualify to the final round.

After the Olympics, Cameron considered retiring, particularly because she wanted to move away to attend Brock University. She flipped a coin to help make her decision, and she decided to continue competing.

In 2014, Cameron and the Canadian group competed at the Pan American Championships in August to qualify for the upcoming 2015 Pan American Games, hosted in Toronto. In the all-around, they finished in 5th place and just qualified. Cameron said she had learned shortly before the competition that they would not automatically qualify because Canada would be hosting the Games. At the 2014 World Championships, they placed 21st.

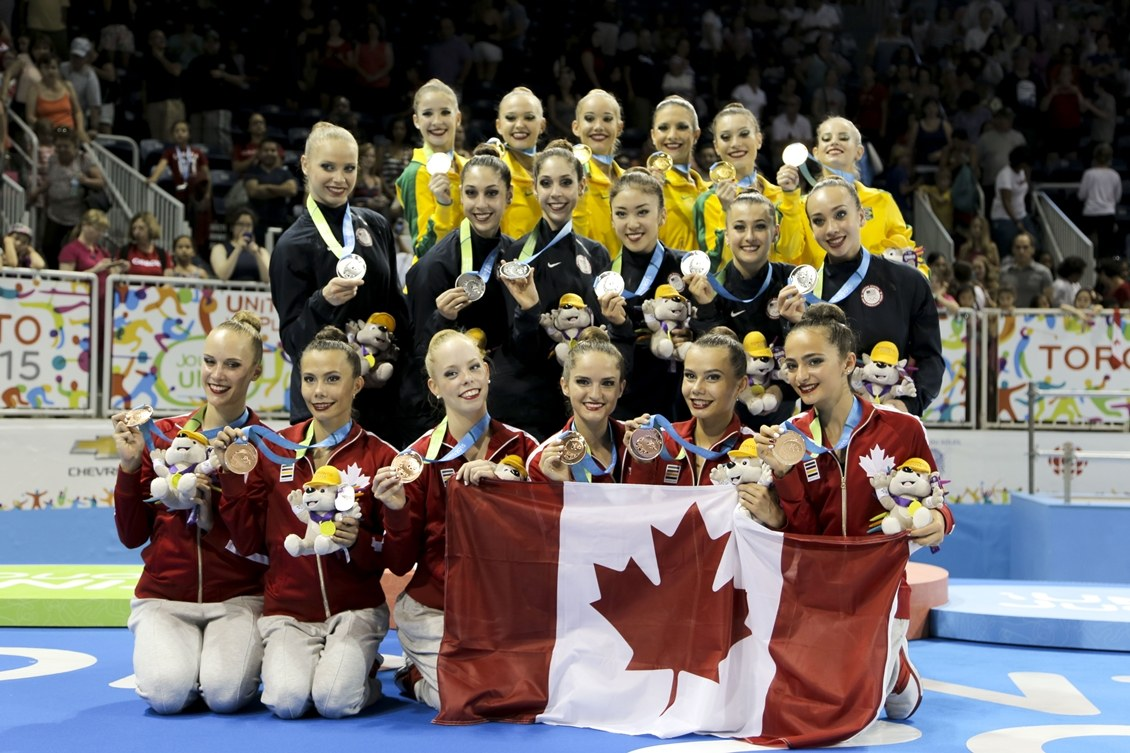
The medal-winning groups in the 2015 Pan American Games 5 ribbons final

In 2015, Cameron was the oldest member of the group competing at the Pan American Games and served as the team captain. Ahead of the Games, they competed at a Grand Prix event in Europe where they placed over the Brazilian group, the favorites for the Games. At the Games, the group placed 5th in the all-around and won bronze in both event finals. The group placed 19th at the 2015 World Championships.

Cameron announced her retirement in July 2016.

== Personal life ==
Cameron has an older sister and two younger brothers. She is naturally left-handed and had to learn to use the apparatuses with her right hand to join the senior national group. She studied at St. Martin Catholic Secondary School before studying humanities at York University.
