= Dayane Amaral =

Brazilian rhythmic gymnast (born 1993)

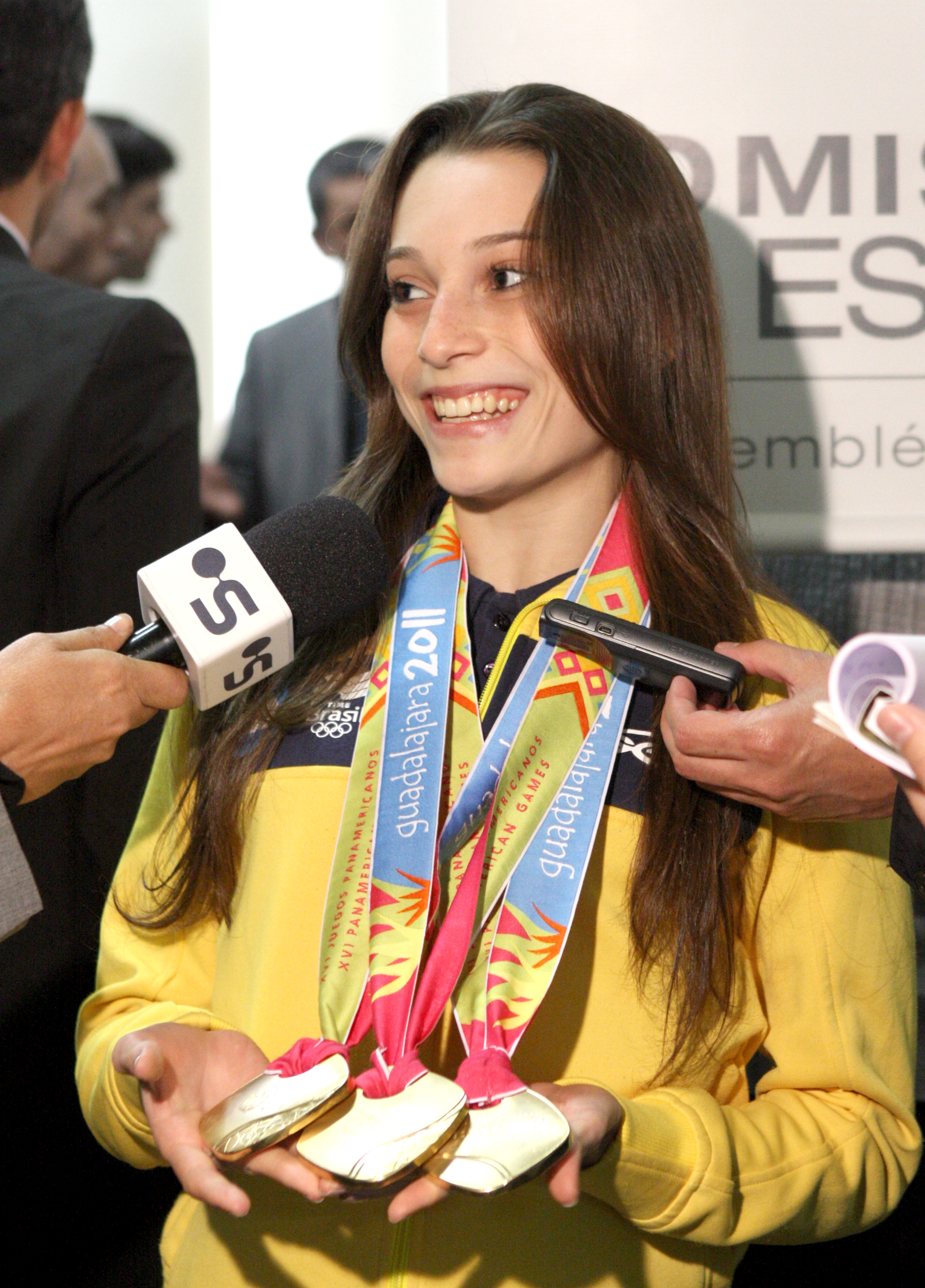
- Gold medalist, Dayane Amaral at the Pan American Games in Guadalajara. She won three gold medals in rhythmic gymnastics.

Personal information
- Born: 15 December 1993 (age 32)

Gymnastics career
- Discipline: Rhythmic gymnastics
- Country represented: Brazil (2011-)
- Head coach: Camila Ferezin
Medal record
Representing Brazil
Group Rhythmic Gymnastics
Pan American Games
Gold medal – first place	2015 Toronto	Group All-around
Gold medal – first place	2015 Toronto	5 ribbons
Silver medal – second place	2015 Toronto	6 clubs + 2 hoops

Dayane Amaral (born 15 December 1993) is a Brazilian group rhythmic gymnast. She represents her nation at international competitions. She competed at world championships, including at the 2011 World Rhythmic Gymnastics Championships.
