= Anjelika Reznik =

Canadian rhythmic gymnast

- Nicknames: Jelly, Jeeka
- Born: 25 June 1995 (age 31) Almaty, Kazakhstan
- Height: 166 cm (5 ft 5 in)

Gymnastics career
- Discipline: Rhythmic gymnastics
- Country represented: Canada (2008–2015)
- Club: Kalev Estienne
- Head coach: Svetlana Joukova
- Former coaches: Lidiya Yavorskaya, Mimi Masleva, Mira Filipova
Medal record
Rhythmic gymnastics
Representing Canada
Pan American Games
| Silver medal – second place | 2011 Guadalajara | Group all-around |
| Silver medal – second place | 2011 Guadalajara | 3 ribbons + 2 hoops |
| Bronze medal – third place | 2011 Guadalajara | 5 balls |
| Bronze medal – third place | 2015 Toronto | 5 ribbons |
| Bronze medal – third place | 2015 Toronto | 6 clubs + 2 hoops |
Pan American Championships
| Silver medal – second place | 2014 Mississauga | 10 clubs |
| Bronze medal – third place | 2014 Mississauga | 3 balls + 2 ribbons |
Youth Olympic Games
| Bronze medal – third place | 2010 Singapore | Group all-around |

Anjelika Reznik (born 25 June 1995) is a Canadian former rhythmic gymnast who primarily competed as a group member. She competed at the 2012 Summer Olympics in London.

== Early and personal life ==
Reznik was born in Almaty, Kazakhstan. Her family is Jewish, and they moved to Bat Yam, Israel when Reznik was two. When she was 10, they moved again to Toronto, Canada.

She is the twin sister of Victoria Reznik, who also competed in the Canadian national group. Their grandparents were artistic gymnasts, and their mother was a rhythmic gymnast who competed on the Kazakh national team. She did not initially put them into gymnastics, and when they expressed interest in training recreationally after moving to Canada, she did not intend for them to become elite gymnasts.

== Career ==
Reznik started training at age 10, considered unusually late in rhythmic gymnastics. During her career, she often trained in facilities that were inadequate, except when she and the team had the opportunity to train in countries like Spain and Bulgaria that had more resources for rhythmic gymnastics.

At the 2009 Junior Pan American Championships, Reznik won a silver medal in the team event, and she and the group won all three gold medals in the group events. This earned them a berth to compete at the 2010 Youth Olympic Games. In August 2010, she competed at the first-ever Youth Olympics as a group member; the Canadian group rose from 4th after qualifications to win the bronze medal.

The next year, Reznik became a senior. At the 2011 Pan American Games, Reznik and the other members of the group won silver in the all-around. In the event finals, they won a second silver in the 3 ribbons + 2 balls final and bronze in the 5 balls final.

Reznik was originally the group substitute for one of the group's two routines, but a month before the 2011 World Championships, one of her teammates was injured, and Reznik began practicing the other routine as well. She later said that she "felt a lot of pressure" with so little time to prepare. In September, she competed at the World Championships, where the group placed 17th in the all-around. As the top-ranked team from the Americas, they qualified a berth at the upcoming 2012 Summer Olympics. This was the first time Canada had qualified a group for the Olympics.

At the Olympics, during the qualification round, the Canadian group finished their 5 balls routine in last place after making a mistake during their performance. They moved up a place after their second routine but did not qualify to the final round.

After the Olympics, most of the group retired; Reznik was one of two gymnasts who continued competing. Her twin sister, Victoria Reznik, joined Anjelika on the national team in 2014. Anjelika Reznik said of competing in the group with her sister, "It definitely pushes you to try harder."

In 2014, she competed at the Pan American Championships, held in Mississauga, Canada. The group was 5th in the all-around but won bronze in both event finals. They competed at the World Cup held in Pesaro, Italy and placed 20th in the all-around. At the 2014 World Championships, the group placed 21st in the all-around.

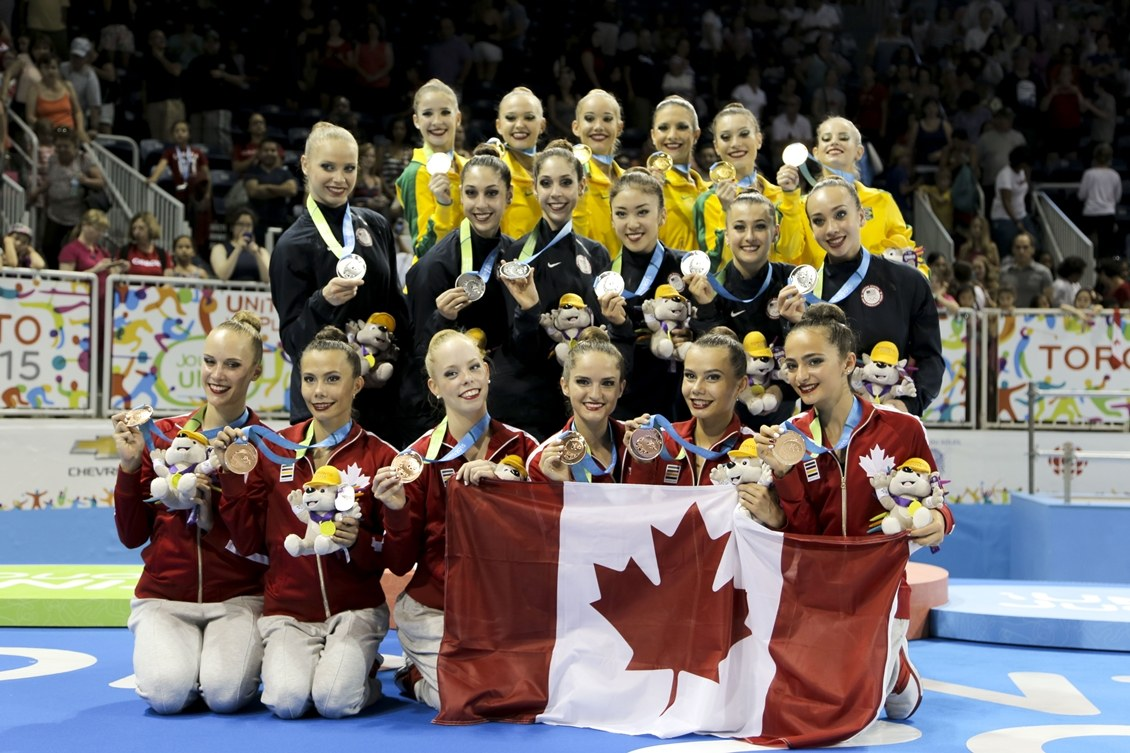
The medal-winning groups in the 2015 Pan American Games 5 ribbons final

Before the 2015 Pan American Games, held in Toronto, high-quality training facilities were built, allowing the team to train properly in Canada. At the Games, the team placed 5th in the all-around and won bronze in both event finals.

In September, Reznik competed with the Canadian group at the 2015 World Championships and placed 19th in the all-around. They failed to qualify for the 2016 Summer Olympics, and the group members retired, including Reznik. In a 2019 interview, Reznik expressed that she felt the sport "does come down to politics" and that she felt the score of the American team, which won the continental Olympic berth for the Americas at the World Championships, was "unfair".

== Post-gymnastics career ==
In 2016, Reznik began competing for the Ryerson University cheerleading team. She became a flyer (cheerleader lifted into the air) and had to learn how to flip, something that is not done in rhythmic gymnastics. She also started to compete in aesthetic group gymnastics, a similar sport that does not use apparatuses. Reznik considered it to be easier on her body, as it does not require as much flexibility or as intense of training.

She studied politics and governance at Ryerson and has expressed interest in improving the state of rhythmic gymnastics in Canada.
