= Alexandra Landry =

Canadian rhythmic gymnast

- Born: 10 February 1994 (age 32) Montréal, Québec, Canada
- Height: 170 cm (5 ft 7 in)

Gymnastics career
- Discipline: Rhythmic gymnastics
- Country represented: Canada (2010–2012 (?))

Alexandra Landry (born 10 February 1994) is a Canadian retired group rhythmic gymnast. She won three medals at the 2011 Pan American Games and was a member of Canada's first group to compete at the Olympics in 2012.

== Early life ==
Landry was born in Montreal and speaks French in addition to English.

== Gymnastics career ==
Landry began rhythmic gymnastics in 2002 after joining a recreational after-school program, and she first competed internationally in 2007. She began competing as a group member in 2008.

In 2010, Landry began competing with the senior international group. The group finished 14th at the 2010 World Championships. At the Pan American Championships, held in December, the Canadian group won all three available gold medals.

The next year, at the World Championships in September, the group placed 17th and earned Canada's first-ever Olympic berth in the group event. Prior to the Pan American Games, held in Mexico in October, the team trained in Spain and Bulgaria for two and a half months. At the Games, the group won silver in the all-around and with their 3 ribbons + 2 hoops routines, as well as bronze with their 5 balls routine. Landry said of their preparation for the upcoming 2012 Summer Olympics, "We're looking at a lot of brutal hours in the gym, but we're definitely going to become more of a team." After the Games, Landry expressed that she enjoyed being able to participate in a multi-sport competition. She also said that the crowd was supportive and that "it was just so great competing for a crowd that just wanted Canada to win and just cheered for us so much."

Ahead of the Olympics, Landry expressed that the team wanted to make the group finals at the Olympics, though that would be a difficult goal to reach. In July 2012, the group competed at a World Cup event in Belarus, where they placed eight in the 3 ribbons + 2 hoops final. Landry said, "Our goal going into the competition was to make one final and in that final to compete with no major mistakes and we accomplished that." Afterward, the group trained in Spain for the remaining three weeks before the Olympics.

At the 2012 Olympics, the team placed 11th in the rhythmic group all-around. They finished their 5 balls routine in last place after making a mistake during their performance. The group moved up a place after their second routine, but they did not qualify to the final round. Landry was the group alternate on the first day and the competed in the 3 ribbons + 2 hoops routine on the second. She ceased training after the Olympics. In September, Landry was honored at a town council meeting in her hometown of Ajax, Ontario along with soccer player Candace Chapman.

== Post-gymnastics career ==
Landry worked at Tennis Canada before the COVID-19 pandemic. She now works at a mortgage agency in Montreal.

=== Allegations of abuse ===
In 2022, Landry was among over 500 athletes who signed an open letter by the group Gymnastics For Change Canada demanding an investigation into Gymnastics Canada. She also came forward with allegations that she experienced physical, verbal, and mental abuse during her career, saying that she had been slapped by her coach, Svetlana Zhukova, threatened with removal from the team, and told she was fat and to lose weight in dangerous ways, such as by eating insufficient calories. The team captain, Rose Cossar, said she had witnessed Zhukova harassing Landry about her weight. Zhukova denied all allegations. Landry said that she had few happy memories of her time in the group and would not put any children she might have in gymnastics.

Landry alleged that after Mariam Chamilova, an individual gymnast who had previously declined a spot in the group, failed to qualify a spot for the Olympics, harassment began in an effort to put Chamilova in the group in her place, though Gymnastics Canada declined to allow her to join. The issue was taken to the Sport Dispute Resolution Centre of Canada, which found in favor of Gymnastics Canada and the existing group members.

Landry's parents also said they had witnessed derogatory remarks and screaming in practice sessions, and that when they reported it, they faced retaliation from the federation. The general manager of Gymnastics Canada during the time she competed denied this happened and said the federation did not handle problems raised at the club level.
