= Handball at the 2011 Pan American Games =

- Venue: San Rafael Gymnasium
- Dates: 15–24 October
- Competitors: 240 from 10 nations

Handball competitions at the Guadalajara 2011 Pan American Games was held from October 15 to 24 at the San Rafael Gymnasium. Medals were awarded for both men and women's team events. Each NOC is permitted to enter one men's team and one women's team in the handball competitions. Each team will consist of 15 athletes. The winner of each event is qualified to compete at the 2012 Summer Olympics in London, Great Britain.

== Medal summary ==
=== Medal count ===
Rank	Nation	Gold	Silver	Bronze	Total
1	Argentina	1	1	0	2
1	Brazil	1	1	0	2
3	Chile	0	0	1	1
3	Dominican Republic	0	0	1	1
Totals (4 entries)		2	2	2	6

=== Events ===
Event	Gold	Silver	Bronze
Men	Argentina; Gonzalo Carou; Federico Fernandez; Fernando Garcia; Juan Fernandez; Andrés Kogovsek; Damián Migueles; Federico Pizarro; Cristian Plati; Pablo Portela; Leonardo Querin; Matías Schulz; Diego Simonet; Sebastián Simonet; Juan Vidal; Federico Vieyra	Brazil; Leonardo Bortolini; Gustavo Cardoso; Fabio Chiuffa; Bruno De Santana; Marcos Paulo Santos; Thiagus dos Santos; Jaqson Kojoroski; Fernando Filho; Gil Pires; Felipe Ribeiro; Renato Rui; Maik Santos; Ales Silva; Henrique Teixeira; Vinicius Teixeira	Chile; Guillermo Araya; Felipe Barrientos; Rodolfo Cornejo; Rodrigo Diaz; Emil Feuchtmann; Erwin Feuchtmann; Harald Feuchtmann; Nicolas Jofre; Patricio Martinez; Felipe Maurin; Rene Oliva; Marco Oneto; Esteban Salinas; Rodrigo Salinas; Alfredo Valenzuela
Women	Brazil; Eduarda Amorim; Barbara Arenhart; Moniky Bancilon; Francine Cararo; Deonise Cavaleiro; Fernanda Da Silva; Fabiana Diniz; Alexandra Do Nascimento; Mayara Moura; Daniela Piedade; Silvia Pinheiro; Jessica Quintino; Samira Rocha; Ana Paula Rodrigues; Chana Souza	Argentina; Maria Belotti; Valeria Bianchi; Maria Decilio; Bibiana Ferrea; Lucia Haro; Valentina Kogan; Antonela Mena; Luciana Mendoza; Manuela Pizzo; Maria Romero; Noelia Sala; Luciana Salvado; Silvina Schlesinger; Solange Tagliavini; Silvana Totolo	Dominican Republic; Mariela Andino; Mariela Cespedes; Mari Tavares; Cari Dominguez; Mileidys Garcia; Judith Granado; Crisleydy Hernandez; Carolina Lopez; Yndiana Mateo; Nancy Peña; Johanna Pimentel; Jessica Sierra; Suleidi Suarez; Yacaira Tejada; Debora Ortiz

== Qualification ==
An NOC may enter up to one men's team with 15 players and up to one women's team with 15 players. Mexico, as the host country qualify automatically, as do seven other countries through regional tournaments.

Italicized teams qualified via the last chance tournaments.

=== Handball – Men ===
North America	South America	Automatic qualifiers
Canada; Dominican Republic; United States	Brazil; Argentina; Chile; Venezuela	Mexico

=== Handball – Women ===
North America	South America	Automatic qualifiers
United States; Dominican Republic; Puerto Rico	Argentina; Brazil; Uruguay; Chile	Mexico

== Schedule ==
The competition was spread out across nine days, with the men and women competing on alternating dates.

Preliminary round	Semifinals	M	Event finals

October	15th Sat	16th Sun	17th Mon	18th Tue	19th Wed	20th Thu	21st Fri	22nd Sat	23rd Sun	24th Mon	Gold medals
Men										M	1
Women									M		1

== See also ==
- List of Pan American Games medalists in handball (men)
