= Argentina at the 2011 Pan American Games =

- IOC code: ARG
- NOC: Comité Olímpico Argentino

in Guadalajara 14–30 October 2011
- Competitors: 486 in 37 sports
- Flag bearer: Walter Pérez
- Medals Ranked 7th: Gold 21 Silver 19 Bronze 34 Total 74

Pan American Games appearances (overview)
- 1951; 1955; 1959; 1963; 1967; 1971; 1975; 1979; 1983; 1987; 1991; 1995; 1999; 2003; 2007; 2011; 2015; 2019; 2023; 2027

Argentina competed at the 2011 Pan American Games in Guadalajara, Mexico from October 14 to 30, 2011.

== Medalists ==
Medal	Name	Sport	Event	Date
Gold	Cristian Rosso; Ariel Suárez	Rowing	Double sculls (M2x)	October 17
Gold	Joaquín Iwan; Sebastián Fernández; Rodrigo Murillo; Agustín Silvestro	Rowing	Coxless four (M4-)	October 17
Gold	María Laura Abalo; María Gabriela Best	Rowing	Coxless pair (W2-)	October 17
Gold	Sebastián Crismanich	Taekwondo	Welterweight (−80kg)	October 17
Gold	Cristian Rosso; Ariel Suárez; Santiago Fernández; Alejandro Cucchietti	Rowing	Quadruple sculls (M4x)	October 18
Gold	Gabriela Best; María Laura Abalo; Milka Kraljev; María Clara Rohner	Rowing	Quadruple sculls (W4x)	October 19
Gold	Liu Song	Table Tennis	Men's singles	October 20
Gold	María Irigoyen; Florencia Molinero	Tennis	Women's Doubles	October 21
Gold	Cecilia Biagioli	Swimming	Women's 10-kilometre marathon	October 22
Gold	Javier Andrés Julio	Water Skiing	Men's overall	October 22
Gold	Javier Andrés Julio	Water Skiing	Men's tricks	October 23
Gold	Julio Alsogaray	Sailing	Men's Laser class	October 23
Gold	Cecilia Carranza Saroli	Sailing	Women's Laser Radial class	October 23
Gold	Elizabeth Soler	Roller Skating	Women's free skating	October 24
Gold	Argentina men's national handball team: Gonzalo Carou; Federico Fernández; Juan Pablo Fernández; Fernando García; Andrés Kogovsek; Damián Migueles; Federico Pizarro; Cristian Platti; Pablo Portela; Leonardo Querín; Matías Schulz; Diego Simonet; Sebastián Simonet; Juan Vidal; Federico Vieyra	Handball	Men's tournament	October 24
Gold	Facundo Andreasen; Sergio Gabriel Villegas	Basque pelota	Men's Paleta Rubber Pairs Trinkete	October 26
Gold	Jorge Villegas; Cristian Andrés Algarbe	Basque pelota	Men's Paleta Leather Pairs Trinkete	October 26
Gold	Fernando Gabriel Ergueta; Javier Alejandro Nicosia	Basque pelota	Men's Paleta Rubber Pairs 30m	October 26
Gold	Lis García; Verónica Andrea Stele	Basque pelota	Women's Paleta Rubber Pairs Trinkete	October 27
Gold	Argentina men's national field hockey team	Field hockey	Men	October 29
Gold	Paula Pareto	Judo	Women's 48 kg	October 29
Silver	Matías Médici	Cycling	Men's road time trial	October 16
Silver	Pablo Tabachnik; Liu Song; Gastón Alto	Table Tennis	Men's team	October 17
Silver	María Gabriela Best	Rowing	Single sculls (W1x)	October 18
Silver	Diego Gallina; Nicolai Fernández; Carlo Lauro; Pablo Mahnic	Rowing	Lightweight coxless four (LM4-)	October 19
Silver	Alex Suligoy	Shooting	Men's 50 m rifle prone	October 19
Silver	Mariano Reutemann	Sailing	Men's sailboard	October 23
Silver	Argentina women's handball team: María Amelia Belotti; Valeria Bianchi; María Decilio; Bibiana Ferrea; Lucía Haro; Valentina Kogan; Antonela Mena; Luciana Mendoza; Manuela Pizzo; María Romero; Noelia Sala; Luciana Salvado; Silvina Schlesinger; Solange Tagliavini; Silvana Totolo	Handball	Women's tournament	October 23
Silver	Daniel Arriola	Roller Skating	Men's free skating	October 24
Silver	Melisa Bonnet	Roller Skating	Women's 10,000 metres	October 27
Silver	Ezequiel Capellano	Roller Skating	Men's 1,000 metres	October 27
Silver	Ezequiel Capellano	Roller Skating	Men's 10,000 metres	October 27
Silver	Daniel Dal Bo	Canoeing	Men's K-1 1000 metres	October 28
Silver	Argentina national under-23 football team	Football	Men	October 28
Silver	Argentina women's national field hockey team	Field hockey	Women	October 28
Silver	Alejandro Clara	Judo	Men's 73 kg	October 28
Silver	Miguel Correa	Canoeing	Men's K-1 200 metres	October 29
Silver	Sabrina Ameghino; Alexandra Keresztesi	Canoeing	Women's K-2 500 metres	October 29
Silver	Miguel Correa; Rubén Rézola	Canoeing	Men's K-2 200 metres	October 29
Silver	Argentina national rugby sevens team	Rugby sevens	Men	October 30
Bronze	Hernán D'Arcangelo; Robertino Pezzota	Squash	Men's doubles	October 16
Bronze	Maximiliano Almada; Marcos Crespo; Facundo Lezica; Eduardo Sepúlveda	Cycling	Men's team pursuit	October 17
Bronze	Ana Carrasco	Gymnastics	Rhythmic individual ribbon	October 18
Bronze	Juan Martín Pereyra	Swimming	Men's 1500 metre freestyle	October 18
Bronze	Mariano Sosa; Nicolás Silvestro; Ariel Suárez; Rodrigo Murillo; Diego López; Joaquín Iwan; Joel Infante; Sebastián Fernández; Sebastián Claus	Rowing	Coxed eight (M8+)	October 19
Bronze	Walter Pérez	Cycling	Men's Omnium	October 19
Bronze	Leandro Botasso	Cycling	Men's Keirin	October 20
Bronze	Gabriela Díaz	Cycling	Women's BMX	October 21
Bronze	Melisa Gil	Shooting	Women's skeet	October 21
Bronze	Lucas Peralta; Federico Grabich; Marcos Barale; Lucas Del Piccolo	Swimming	Men's 4 x 100-metre medley relay	October 21
Bronze	Yuri Maier	Wrestling	Men's Greco-Roman 96 kg	October 21
Bronze	Pablo Suárez; Santiago Etchegaray	Beach volleyball	Men's tournament	October 22
Bronze	Guillermo Bertola	Swimming	Men's 10-kilometre marathon	October 22
Bronze	Patricia Bermúdez	Wrestling	Women's Freestyle 48 kg	October 22
Bronze	Luz Vázquez	Wrestling	Women's Freestyle 63 kg	October 22
Bronze	Alejo De Palma	Water skiing	Men's wakeboard	October 23
Bronze	Francisco Renna	Sailing	Sunfish class	October 23
Bronze	Germán Lauro	Athletics	Men's shot put	October 25
Bronze	Pamela Benavídez	Boxing	Women's flyweight 51 kg	October 25
Bronze	Carlos Dorato; Luciano Callerelli	Basque pelota	Men's Paleta Leather Pairs 36m Fronton	October 26
Bronze	Irina Podversich; Johanna Zair	Basque pelota	Women's Frontenis Pairs 30m Fronton	October 26
Bronze	Elida Agüero	Fencing	Women's épée	October 26
Bronze	Juan Cruz Araldi	Roller Skating	Men's 300 metres time-trial	October 26
Bronze	Cristian Schmidt	Judo	Men's 100 kg	October 26
Bronze	Jorge Alberdi; Alexis Clementín	Basque pelota	Men's Frontenis Pairs 30m Fronton	October 27
Bronze	Emmanuel Lucenti	Judo	Men's 81 kg	October 27
Bronze	Melisa Bonnet	Roller Skating	Women's 1,000 metres	October 27
Bronze	Braian Toledo	Athletics	Men's javelin throw	October 28
Bronze	Yamil Peralta	Boxing	Men's Heavyweight 91 kg	October 28
Bronze	Pablo de Torres; Roberto Geringer Sallette	Canoeing	Men's K-2 1000 metres	October 28
Bronze	Alexandra Keresztesi	Canoeing	Women's K-1 500 metres	October 28
Bronze	Adela Peralta	Boxing	Women's light welterweight 60 kg	October 29
Bronze	Sabrina Ameghino	Canoeing	Women's K-1 200 metres	October 29
Bronze	Argentina men's national volleyball team	Volleyball	Men	October 29

Medals by sport
Sport	1st place, gold medalist(s)	2nd place, silver medalist(s)	3rd place, bronze medalist(s)	Total
Rowing	5	2	1	8
Basque pelota	4	0	3	7
Sailing	2	1	1	4
Water Skiing	2	0	1	3
Roller Skating	1	4	2	7
Judo	1	1	2	4
Field hockey	1	1	0	2
Handball	1	1	0	2
Table Tennis	1	1	0	2
Swimming	1	0	3	4
Taekwondo	1	0	0	1
Tennis	1	0	0	1
Canoeing	0	4	3	7
Cycling	0	1	4	5
Shooting	0	1	1	2
Football	0	1	0	1
Rugby sevens	0	1	0	1
Wrestling	0	0	3	3
Boxing	0	0	3	3
Athletics	0	0	2	2
Beach volleyball	0	0	1	1
Fencing	0	0	1	1
Gymnastics	0	0	1	1
Squash	0	0	1	1
Volleyball	0	0	1	1
Total	21	19	34	74

== Archery ==
Argentina qualified a team of four athletes, one male and three female.

Athlete	Event	Ranking Round		Round of 32	Round of 16	Quarterfinals	Semi-finals	Final
Athlete	Event	Score	Seed	Opposition Score	Opposition Score	Opposition Score	Opposition Score	Opposition Score
Genaro Riccio	Men's individual	1211	27th	Juan Carlos Stevens (CUB); L 0 – 6	Did not advance			
Ximena Mendiberry	Women's individual	1242	18th	Nadya Ruiz (PUR); L 0 – 6	Did not advance			
Fernanda Faisal	Women's individual	1207	25th	María Gabriela Goñi (ARG); L 2 – 6	Did not advance			
María Gabriela Goñi	Women's individual	1282	8th	Fernanda Faisal (ARG); W 6 – 2	Denisse Astrid Van Lamoen (CHI); L 4 – 6	Did not advance		
María Gabriela Goñi; Fernanda Faisal; Ximena Mendiberry	Women's team	3731	6th		Venezuela; L 191 – 198	Did not advance		

== Athletics ==
=== Men ===
Track and road events

Event	Athletes	Heat		Semi-final		Final	
Event	Athletes	Result	Rank	Result	Rank	Result	Rank
100 m	Miguel Wilken	10.66	27th	Did not advance			
200 m	Mariano Jiménez	21.20	20th	21.47	21st	Did not advance	
800 m	Juan Sebastián Vega			1:52.60	12th	Did not advance	
1,500 m	Federico Bruno					4:01.09	13th
1,500 m	Javier Carriqueo					3:55.52	6th
5,000 m	Miguel Barzola					14:44.23	11th
10,000 m	Miguel Barzola					30:12.82	6th
3000 m steeplechase	Mariano Mastromarino					9:09.42	10th
20km walk	Juan Manuel Cano Ceres					1:27:33	9th
20km walk	Fabio Benito González					1:30:40	11th

Field events

Event	Athletes	Qualification		Final	
Event	Athletes	Result	Rank	Result	Rank
High jump	Carlos Daniel Layoy			2.18	10th
Pole vault	Rubén Benítez			5.05	9th
Pole vault	Germán Chiaraviglio			5.50	4th
Triple jump	Maximiliano Díaz			16.47	4th
Shot put	Germán Lauro			20.41	3rd place, bronze medalist(s)
Shot put	Nicolás Martina			17.33	11th
Discus throw	Jorge Esteban Balliengo			51.93	10th
Hammer throw	Juan Ignacio Cerra			66.80	6th
Javelin throw	Braian Toledo			79.53	3rd place, bronze medalist(s)

Combined events

Decathlon	Event	Román Gastaldi		
Decathlon	Event	Results	Points	Rank
	100 m	10.65	940	1st
	Long jump	7.37	903	3rd
	Shot put	14.01	729	6th
	High jump	1.99	794	4th
	400 m	49.54	836	7th
	110 m hurdles	14.71	885	7th
	Discus throw	43.08	727	6th
	Pole vault	4.20	673	9th
	Javelin throw	55.97	677	9th
	1500 m	4:42.95	662	3rd
Final			7826	5th

=== Women ===
Track and road events

Event	Athletes	Heat		Semi-final		Final	
Event	Athletes	Result	Rank	Result	Rank	Result	Rank
800 m	Nancy Gallo					2:09.10	8th
1,500 m	Sandra Amarillo					4:29.49	6th
1,500 m	Nancy Soledad Gallo					4:31.96	9th
5,000 m	Rosa Liliana Godoy					17:33.77	12th
5,000 m	Nadia Rodríguez					17:14.91	10th
Marathon	Raquel Maraviglia					Did not finish	

Field events

Event	Athletes	Qualification		Final	
Event	Athletes	Result	Rank	Result	Rank
High jump	Jorgelina Rodríguez			1.65	10th
Pole vault	Alejandra García Flood			4.20	6th
Pole vault	Daniela Inchausti			4.00	9th
Discus throw	Bárbara Comba			56.05	6th
Hammer throw	Jennifer Dahlgren			67.11	6th

Combined events

Heptathlon	Event	Agustina Zerboni		
Heptathlon	Event	Results	Points	Rank
	100 m hurdles	13.66	1027	2nd
	High jump	1.59	724	9th
	Shot put	12.74	710	6th
	200 m	24.84	902	4th
	Long jump	5.44	683	7th
	Javelin throw	39.79	663	5th
	800 m	2:24.51	763	6th
Final			5472	5th

== Badminton ==
One female and one male Argentine athletes qualified for the badminton tournament.

Athlete	Event	Round of 64	Round of 32	Round of 16	Quarterfinals	Semi-finals	Final	
Athlete	Event	Opposition Score	Opposition Score	Opposition Score	Opposition Score	Opposition Score	Opposition Score	Rank
Federico Díaz	Men's singles	O Guerrero (CUB); L 5 – 21, 15 – 21	Did not advance					
Victoria Valdesolo	Women's singles		C Leefmans (SUR); L 16 – 21, 6 – 21	Did not advance				
Federico Díaz; Victoria Valdesolo	Mixed doubles		O Guerrero (CUB); M Hernández (CUB); L 12 – 21, 9 – 21	Did not advance				

== Basketball ==
Both the men's and women's teams of Argentina qualified for the basketball tournament.

=== Men ===
- Alejandro Alloatti
- Luis Cequeira
- Marcos Delía
- Pablo Espinoza
- Juan Fernández Chávez
- Juan Fernández
- Miguel Gerlero
- Luciano González
- Nicolas Laprovíttola
- Marcos Mata
- Nicolás Romano
- Matías Sandes

The Argentine Men's team competed in group A.

Pos	Team	Pld	W	L	PF	PA	PD	Pts	Qualification
1	Puerto Rico	3	2	1	231	206	+25	5 (Note: Puerto Rico 73–69 Mexico)	Advance to Semifinals
2	Mexico (H)	3	2	1	231	194	+37	5	Advance to Semifinals
3	Canada	3	1	2	206	238	−32	4 (Note: Canada 83–79 Argentina)	
4	Argentina	3	1	2	214	244	−30	4	

(H) Hosts
Notes:

October 26
10:30

Report

Canada	83–79 (OT)	Argentina
Scoring by quarter: 16–22, 18–17, 10–14, 26–17, Overtime: 13–9
Pts: Scrubb, 35; Rebs: Ward, 10; Asts: Scrubb, 3		Pts: Laprovíttola, 16; Rebs: Espinoza, 7 Asts: Cequeira, 4

CODE Dome, Guadalajara
Referees: Vazquez (URU), Rodríguez (VEN), Stith (USA)

October 27
13:00

Report

Argentina	79–78	Puerto Rico
Scoring by quarter: 24–22, 25–9, 13–22, 15–17
Pts: Sandes 15; Rebs: Sandes 8 Asts: Laprovittola 5		Pts: Barea 24; Rebs: Santiago 8 Asts: Barea, Berdiel 2

CODE Dome, Guadalajara
Referees: Rodriguez (VEN), Benito (BRA), Fernandez (CRC)

October 28
20:00

Report

Mexico	83–56	Argentina
Scoring by quarter: 18–15, 12–10, 25– 16, 28–15
Pts: Harris 22; Rebs: Real 14; Asts: Quintero 3		Pts: González 15; Rebs: Sandes 8 Asts: Laprovittola 4

CODE Dome, Guadalajara
Referees: Benito (BRA), Stith (USA), Vazquez (URU)

Seventh place match

October 29
10:30

Report

Argentina	71–69	Uruguay
Scoring by quarter: 22–16, 18–12, 20–20, 11–21
Pts: Sandes 23; Rebs: Sandes 10; Asts: 3 players 3		Pts: Borsellino 15; Rebs: Borsellino 10; Asts: Osimani 8

CODE Dome, Guadalajara
Referees: Vazquez (PUR), Hayles (JAM), Fernandez (CRC)

2011 Pan American Games 7th

Argentina

=== Women ===
- Agostina Burani
- Diana Cabrera
- Marina Cava
- Nadia Flores
- Melisa Gretter
- Melisa Pavicich
- Sandra Pavón
- Natacha Pérez
- Paula Reggiardo
- Rocío Rojas
- Ornella Santana
- Melani Soriani

The Argentine Women's team competed in Group A.

Pos	Team	Pld	W	L	PF	PA	PD	Pts	Qualification
1	Mexico (H)	3	2	1	192	218	−26	5 (Note: Mexico 76–74 Puerto Rico)	Advance to Semifinals
2	Puerto Rico	3	2	1	222	216	+6	5	Advance to Semifinals
3	Argentina	3	1	2	185	186	−1	4 (Note: Argentina 58–55 United States)	
4	United States	3	1	2	212	191	+21	4	

(H) Hosts
Notes:

October 21
13:00

Report

United States	55–58	Argentina
Scoring by quarter: 19–5, 5–15, 13–22, 18–16
Pts: Stewart, 18; Rebs: Stewart, 21; Asts: James, 2		Pts: Gretter, 21; Rebs: Burani, 7 Asts: Gretter, 5

CODE Dome, Guadalajara

October 22
20:00

Report

Argentina	57–58	Mexico
Scoring by quarter: 18–19, 19–10, 7–12, 13–17
Pts: Gretter, 14; Rebs: Burani, 11; Asts: Santana, 3		Pts: Gomez, 20; Rebs: A. Garcia, 13; Asts: Gomez, 4

CODE Dome, Guadalajara

October 23
13:00

Report

Puerto Rico	73–70	Argentina
Scoring by quarter: 16–17, 21–22, 10–13, 26–18
Pts: Escalera 18; Rebs: Sepulveda 5 Asts: Cortijo 4		Pts: Burani 24; Rebs: Burani, Pavon 7 Asts: Carbrera 6

CODE Dome, Guadalajara

Fifth place match

October 24
17:30

Report

Argentina	50–38	Canada
Scoring by quarter: 17–4, 6–9, 16–13, 11–12
Pts: Reggiardo, 17; Rebs: Burani, 8 Asts: Pavón, 2		Pts: Colley, 11; Rebs: Wolfram, 7 Asts: Colley, 3

CODE Dome, Guadalajara

2011 Pan American Games 5th

Argentina

== Basque pelota ==
Eighteen athletes representing Argentina participated at the 2011 Pan American Games in Basque pelota competitions.

=== Men ===
Athlete(s)	Event	Series 1	Series 2	Series 3	Series 4	Finals	Rank
Athlete(s)	Event	Opposition Score	Opposition Score	Opposition Score	Opposition Score	Opposition Score	Rank
Facundo Andreasen; Sergio Gabriel Villegas	Paleta Rubber Pairs Trinkete	C Buzzo (URU); E Cazzola (URU); W 15 – 4, 15 – 3	A Raya (MEX); G Verdeja (MEX); W 15 – 6, 15 – 9	J Pina (VEN); J Zarraga (VEN); W 15 – 4, 15 – 4	S De Orte (CHI); E Romero (CHI); W 15 – 3, 15 – 6	C Buzzo (URU); E Cazzola (URU); W 15 – 4, 15 – 3	1st place, gold medalist(s)
Cristian Andrés Algarbe; Jorge Villegas	Paleta Leather Pairs Trinkete	P Baldizan (URU); G Dufau (URU); W 15 – 7, 15 – 12	J Herrera (MEX); J Marin (MEX); W 15 – 4, 15 – 8	S Perez (CHI); R Saez (CHI); W 16 – 3, 15 – 10	F Fernandez (CUB); A Jardines (CUB); W 15 – 8, 15 – 5	P Baldizan (URU); G Dufau (URU); W 15 – 7, 15 – 13	1st place, gold medalist(s)
Luis Antonio Maidana	Mano Singles Trinkete	R Etchevers (USA); L 2 – 15, 7 – 15				Bronze-medal match R Etchevers (USA); L 1 – 15, 1 – 15	4th
Luciano Callerelli; Carlos Dorato	Paleta Leather Pairs 36m Fronton	J Borrajo (VEN); G Reyes (VEN); W 15 – 9, 15 – 11	R Ledesma (MEX); F Mendiburu (MEX); L 2 – 15, 2 – 15	L Rivas (URU); E Tavares (URU); W 15 – 4, 15 – 13	R Fernandez (CUB); A Perez (CUB); W 11 – 15, 15 – 14, 5 – 0	Bronze-medal match J Borrajo (VEN); G Reyes (VEN); W 15 – 10, 15 – 4	3rd place, bronze medalist(s)
Nicolás Alberto Comas	Mano Singles 36m Fronton	R Huarte (USA); L 1 – 10, 1 – 10				Did not advance	
Axel Raúl Mikkan; Lucas Esteban Varrone	Mano Doubles 36m Fronton	J Huarte (USA); T Huarte (USA); L 1 – 10, 1 – 10				Did not advance	
Fernando Gabriel Ergueta; Javier Alejandro Nicosia	Paleta Rubber Pairs 30m Fronton	E Blas (GUA); J Blas (GUA); W 12 – 1, 12 – 1	F Celaya (CHI); P De Orte (CHI); W 12 – 2, 12 – 4	T Fernandez (CRC); J Lopez (CRC); W 12 – 1, 12 – 0	O Bustillo (NCA); V Bustillo (NCA); W 12 – 0, 12 – 1	J Hurtado (MEX); D Rodriguez (MEX); W 12 – 11, 12 – 8	1st place, gold medalist(s)
Jorge Maximiliano Alberdi; Alexis Emanuel Clementín	Frontenis Pairs 30m Fronton	A Rodriguez (MEX); A Rodriguez (MEX); L 0 – 12, 2 – 12	I Trucco (CHI); F Versluys (CHI); W 12 – 9, 11 – 12, 5 – 2	D Delgado (USA); R Tejeda (USA); L 6 – 12, 10 – 12	D Alonso (CUB); C Arocha (CUB); L 10 – 12, 7 – 12	Bronze-medal match D Delgado (USA); R Tejeda (USA); W 8 – 12, 12 – 11, 5 – 1	3rd place, bronze medalist(s)

=== Women ===
Athlete(s)	Event	Series 1	Series 2	Series 3	Series 4	Final	Rank
Athlete(s)	Event	Opposition Score	Opposition Score	Opposition Score	Opposition Score	Opposition Score	Rank
María Lis García; Verónica Andrea Stele	Paleta Rubber Pairs Trinkete	M Miranda (URU); C Naviliat (URU); W 15 – 5, 15 – 5	A Cepeda (MEX); R Guillen (MEX); W 14 – 15, 15 – 14, 5 – 3	D Apablaza (CHI); Z Solas (CHI); W 15 – 6, 15 – 1	Y Allue (CUB); D Darriba (CUB); W 15 – 3, 15 – 3	M Miranda (URU); C Naviliat (URU); W 15 – 9, 15 – 6	1st place, gold medalist(s)
Irina Podversich; Johanna Stefanía Zair	Frontenis Pairs 30m Fronton	R Diaz (VEN); P Toro (VEN); L 7 – 12, 4 – 12	P Castillo (MEX); G Hernandez (MEX); L 0 – 12, 3 – 12	N Bozzo (CHI); A Salgado (CHI); W 12 – 9, 9 – 12, 5 – 2	L Lima (CUB); Y Medina (CUB); L 7 – 12, 3 – 12	Bronze-medal match R Diaz (VEN); P Toro (VEN); W 10 – 12, 12 – 7, 5 – 3	3rd place, bronze medalist(s)

== Beach volleyball ==
Argentina qualified one pair of athletes each for the men's and women's tournaments.

Athlete	Event	Preliminary round			Quarterfinals	Semi-finals	Finals	
Athlete	Event	Opposition Score	Opposition Score	Opposition Score	Opposition Score	Opposition Score	Opposition Score	Rank
Santiago Etchegaray; Pablo Suárez	Men	E Garrido (GUA); A Leonardo (GUA); W 21–19, 21–11	D Brown (JAM); N Gordon (JAM); W 21–13, 21–18	R Rodríguez (PUR); C Underwood (PUR); L 18–21, 19–21	M Van Zwieten (USA); A Fuller (USA); W 21–20, 21–18	I Hernández (VEN); F Mussa (VEN); L 21–19, 16–21, 12–15	Bronze medal match A Miramontes (MEX); J Virgen (MEX); W 14–21, 21–19, 15–11 (bronze)	
Ana Gallay; Virginia Zonta	Women	H Bansley (CAN); E Maloney (CAN); L 21–18, 20–22, 6–15	M Ávalos (ESA); D Romero (ESA); W 21–14, 21–5	Y Santiago (PUR); Y Yantin (PUR); L 18–21, 21–18, 11–15	Did not advance			

== Boxing ==
Seven athletes representing Argentina qualified to the 2011 Pan American Games to participate in the boxing competitions.

=== Men ===
Athlete	Event	Preliminaries	Quarterfinals	Semi-finals	Final
Athlete	Event	Opposition Result	Opposition Result	Opposition Result	Opposition Result
Junior Zárate	Light flyweight	J Ortiz (PUR); L 5 – 10	Did not advance		
Alberto Melián	Bantamweight	J Laviolette (CAN); W 20 – 8	A Rodriguez (VEN); L 6 – 16	Did not advance	
Fabián Maidana	Light welterweight		V Knowles (BAH); L 17 – 17 (44–61)	Did not advance	
Alberto Palmetta	Welterweight	C Banteurt (CUB); L 5 – 15	Did not advance		
Yamil Peralta	Heavyweight		W Rivero (VEN); W 11 – 7	L Pero (CUB); L 9 – 13 (bronze)	Did not advance

=== Women ===
Athlete	Event	Quarterfinals	Semi-finals	Final
Athlete	Event	Opposition Result	Opposition Result	Opposition Result
Paola Benavides	Flyweight		M Bujold (CAN); L 8 – 12 (bronze)	Did not advance
Adela Celeste Peralta	Light welterweight	J Caceres (COL); W 22 – 13	K Tapia (PUR); L RSC R4 3:00 (bronze)	Did not advance

== Canoeing ==
Eight boats represented Argentina at the canoeing competition of the 2011 Pan American Games.

=== Men ===
Athlete(s)	Event	Heats		Semi-finals		Final	
Athlete(s)	Event	Time	Rank	Time	Rank	Time	Rank
Leonardo Niveiro	C-1 1000 m					4:45.499	7th
Leonardo Niveiro	C-1 200 m	46.572	10th	46.125	4th	Did not advance	
Daniel Dal Bo	K-1 1000 m					3:43.038	2nd place, silver medalist(s)
Miguel Correa	K-1 200 m	37.300	5th			36.349	2nd place, silver medalist(s)
Pablo de Torres; Roberto Geringer Sallette	K-2 1000 m					3:19.599	3rd place, bronze medalist(s)
Miguel Correa; Rubén Rézola	K-2 200 m	32.218	2nd			32.494	2nd place, silver medalist(s)
Juan Pablo Bergero; Daniel Dal Bo; Pablo de Torres; Roberto Geringer Sallette	K-4 1000 m					3:04.471	5th

=== Women ===
Athlete(s)	Event	Heats		Semi-finals		Final	
Athlete(s)	Event	Time	Rank	Time	Rank	Time	Rank
Sabrina Ameghino	K-1 200 m	42.268	4th			42.685	3rd place, bronze medalist(s)
Alexandra Keresztesi	K-1 500 m	1:58.951	2nd			1:55.764	3rd place, bronze medalist(s)
María Cecilia Collueque; Alexandra Keresztesi	K-2 500 m	1:49.859	2nd			1:48.005	2nd place, silver medalist(s)
María Cecilia Collueque; María Magdalena Garro; Sabrina Ameghino; Ailín Edith Gutiérrez	K-4 500 m					1:40.085	6th

== Cycling ==
=== Road cycling ===
==== Men ====
Athlete	Event	Time	Rank
Walter Pérez	Road race	3:45:04	16th
Leandro Messineo	Road race	3:50:58	35th
Jorge Giacinti	Road race	3:50:58	36th
Matías Médici	Road race	DNF	
Matías Médici	Time trial	50:00.98	2nd place, silver medalist(s)
Leandro Messineo	Time trial	50:46.98	5th

==== Women ====
Athlete	Event	Time	Rank
Talía Aguirre	Road race	2:19:57	29th
Alejandra Feszczuk	Road race	2:21:13	30th
Dolores Rodríguez Rey	Road race	2:23:03	31st
Valeria Müller	Time trial	29:31.13	10th

=== Track cycling ===
==== Sprints and pursuit ====
Athlete	Event	Qualifying		Round of 16	1/8 finals (repechage)	Quarterfinals	Semi-finals	Final	
Athlete	Event	Time Speed (km/h)	Rank	Opposition Time Speed	Opposition Time Speed	Opposition Time Speed	Opposition Time Speed	Opposition Time Speed	Rank
Leandro Bottasso	Men's sprint	10.122	7th	J Marín (COL); L 10.549	A Pulgar (VEN); A Mainat (CUB); L 10.392	Did not advance			
Jonathan Gatto	Men's sprint	10.313	10th	F Puerta (COL); L 10.473	M Blatchford (USA); F Cipriano (BRA); L 10.449	Did not advance			
Leandro Bottasso; Jonathan Gatto; Walter Pérez	Men's team sprint	47.058	4th					Bronze medal match Colombia; L 46.725	4th
Maximiliano Almada; Marcos Crespo; Facundo Lezica; Eduardo Sepúlveda	Men's team pursuit	4:08.887	3rd					Bronze medal match Mexico; W 3:05.333	3rd place, bronze medalist(s)
Déborah Coronel	Women's sprint	12.194	11th	Did not advance					
Talía Aguirre; Déborah Coronel	Women's team sprint	36.953	6th					Did not advance	
Alejandra Feszcczuk; Valeria Müller; Talía Aguirre	Women's team pursuit	3:40.329	8th			Did not advance			

==== Keirin ====
Athlete	Event	1st round	Repechage	Final
Leandro Bottasso	Men's keirin	2nd		3rd place, bronze medalist(s)
Déborah Coronel	Women's keirin			5th

==== Omnium ====
Athlete	Event	Flying Lap Time Rank	Points Race Points Rank	Elimination Race Rank	Ind Pursuit Time	Scratch Race Rank	Time Trial Time	Final Rank
Walter Pérez	Men	13.567; 6th	65; 4th	4th	4:31.181; 3rd	-2; 7th	1:05.043; 4th	28 (bronze)
Talia Aguirre	Women	15.553; 7th	DNF; 20th	7th	3:54.442; 8th	2nd	38.198; 7th	51; 9th

=== Mountain Biking ===
Argentina qualified three athletes, two male and one female, to compete in the mountain biking cycling competition.

==== Men ====
Athlete	Event	Time	Rank
Catriel Soto	Cross-country	Disqualified	
Luciano Caraccioli	Cross-country	1:41:22	11th

==== Women ====
Athlete	Event	Time	Rank
Noelia Rodríguez	Cross-country	1:40:27	5th

=== BMX ===
Argentina qualified four athletes, two male and female, to compete in the BMX competition.

Athlete	Event	Qualifying Run 1		Qualifying Run 2		Qualifying Run 3		Qualifying	Semi-final		Final	
Athlete	Event	Time	Points	Time	Points	Time	Points	Points	Points	Rank	Time	Rank
Cristian Becerine	Men	36.433	2	36.516	3	36.311	3	8	Did not finish		Did not advance	
Ramiro Marino	Men	36.372	2	36.522	2	36.249	3	7	36.541	4th	36.457	6th
Gabriela Díaz	Women	44.494	2	44.336	2	45.350	3	7			42.971	3rd place, bronze medalist(s)
Mariana Díaz	Women	46.951	3	47.009	3	48.363	3	9			45.278	4th

== Equestrian ==
=== Eventing ===
Athlete	Horse	Event	Dressage		Cross-country		Jumping				Total	
Athlete	Horse	Event	Dressage		Cross-country		Ind Qualifier Team Final		Ind Final		Total	
Athlete	Horse	Event	Penalties	Rank	Penalties	Rank	Penalties	Rank	Penalties	Rank	Penalties	Rank
Martín Bedoya	Remonta Lanza	Individual	65.20	36th	Eliminated							
Fernando Domínguez Silva	Almil Agresivo Z	Individual	53.50	14th	12'15						179.50	29th
José Luis Ortelli	Jos Aladar	Individual	57.40	19th	9'42						62.20	12th
Marcelo Rawson	King's Elf	Individual	65.90	39th	9'59						77.50	20th
Federico Valdéz Diez	Remonta Lima	Individual	65.00	34th	10'02	21st	77.80	17th			81.80	13th
From: Martín Bedoya; Fernando Domínguez Silva; José Luis Ortelli; Marcelo Rawson; Federico Valdéz Diez	As above	Team	175.90	5th	9'42; 12'15; 10'02; 9'59	4th					229.50	4th

=== Jumping ===
==== Individual ====
Athlete	Horse	Event	1st Qualifier		2nd Qualifier			3rd Qualifier			Final					
Athlete	Horse	Event	1st Qualifier		2nd Qualifier			3rd Qualifier			1st round		2nd round		Total	
Athlete	Horse	Event	Penalties	Rank	Penalties	Total	Rank	Penalties	Total	Rank	Penalties	Rank	Penalties	Rank	Penalties	Rank
Matías Albarracín	P'Compadre Bally Cullen Maid	Individual	3.86	14th	13	16.86	34th	0	16.86	24th	9	25.86	20th	5	30.86	16th
Ricardo Dircie	LLavaneras H.J. Aries	Individual	6.81	33rd	13	19.81	37th	5	24.81	33rd	Did not advance					
Martín Dopazo	Chicago Z	Individual	4.26	17th	20	24.26	42nd	8	32.26	42nd	Did not advance					
José María Larocca	Royal Power	Individual	1.49	6th	4	5.49	12th	10	15.49	21st	9	24.49	19th	9	33.49	18th

Team

Athlete	Horse	Event	C1			C2			C3		
Athlete	Horse	Event	Penalties	Total	Rank	Penalties	Total	Rank	Penalties	Total	Rank
From: Matías Albarracín; Ricardo Dircie; Martín Dopazo; José María Larocca	P'Compadre Bally Cullen Maid |LLavaneras H.J. Aries; Chicago Z Royal Power	Team	3.86; 6.81; 4.26; 3.86	9.61	4th	13; 13; 20; 4	39.61	7th	0; 5; 8; 10	52.61	6th

== Fencing ==
Thirteen Argentine athletes participated at the 2011 Pan American Games in different fencing categories.

=== Men ===
Athlete	Event	Elimination Poule	Round of 16	Quarterfinals	Semi-finals	Final
Athlete	Event	Opposition Score	Opposition Score	Opposition Score	Opposition Score	Opposition Score
José Domínguez	Individual épée	3 V – 2 D	W Kelsey (USA); L 8 – 15	Did not advance		
Federico Müller	Individual foil	3 V – 2 D	E Turbide (CAN); L 8 – 15	Did not advance		
Felipe Saucedo	Individual foil	1 V – 4 D	D Gomez (MEX); L 4 – 15	Did not advance		
Alexander Achten	Individual sabre	5 V – 0 D	C Valencia (COL); W 15 – 8	P Beaudry (CAN); L 13 – 15	Did not advance	
Ricardo Bustamante	Individual sabre	4 V – 1 D	Y Iriarte (CUB); L 8 – 15	Did not advance		
Federico Müller; Felipe Saucedo; Ezequiel Abello	Team foil			Mexico; L 27 – 45	5th–8th place match Cuba; L 26 – 45	7th–8th place match Chile; L 27 – 45
Alexander Achten; Ricardo Bustamante; Alberto Pérez Ghersi	Team sabre			Venezuela; L 37 – 45	5th–8th place match Mexico; W 45 – 38	5th–8th place match Cuba; W 45 – 37

=== Women ===
Athlete	Event	Elimination Poule	Round of 16	Quarterfinals	Semi-finals	Final
Athlete	Event	Opposition Score	Opposition Score	Opposition Score	Opposition Score	Opposition Score
Elida Agüero	Individual épée	4 V – 1 D	M Martinez (VEN); W 11 – 10	S Schalm (CAN); W 15 – 14	K Hurley (USA); L 4 – 15 (bronze)	Did not advance
Isabel Di Tella	Individual épée	2 V – 3 D	C Hurley (USA); L 10 – 15	Did not advance		
Estafanía Berninsone	Individual sabre	2 V – 3 D	M Maurice (ARG); W 15 – 9	A Benítez (VEN); L 13 – 15	Did not advance	
María Belén Pérez Maurice	Individual sabre	3 V – 2 D	E Berninosone (ARG); L 9 – 15	Did not advance		
Elida Agüero; Isabel Di Tella; Andrea Chiuchich	Team épée			Brazil; W 39 – 38	United States; L 17 – 45	Bronze-medal match Mexico; L 32 – 45
Estafanía Berninsone; María Belén Pérez Maurice; Adriana Attar Cohen	Team sabre			Dominican Republic; L 44 – 45	5th–8th place match Cuba; L 28 – 45	7th–8th place match Panama; W 45 – 25

== Field hockey ==
=== Men ===
- Tomás Argento
- Ignacio Bergner
- Federico Bermejillo
- Manuel Brunet
- Lucas Cammareri
- Pedro Ibarra
- Juan Martín López
- Agustín Mazzilli
- Matías Paredes
- Lucas Rey
- Lucas Rossi
- Lucas Vila
- Matías Vila
- Rodrigo Vila
- Juan Manuel Vivaldi
- Fernando Zylberberg

The Argentine men's team competed in Pool B.

Pos	Team	Pld	W	D	L	GF	GA	GD	Pts	Qualification
1	Argentina	3	3	0	0	20	1	+19	9	Semi-finals
2	Cuba	3	2	0	1	7	13	−6	6	Semi-finals
3	Mexico (H)	3	1	0	2	4	12	−8	3	
4	United States	3	0	0	3	4	9	−5	0	

Source: PAHF
(H) Hosts

October 20, 2011
14:00

Argentina	8–0	Mexico
Paredes 4', 53'; Luchetti 29'; Bergner 35', 48', 51'; Vila 52'; López 58'	Report

Pan American Hockey Stadium
Umpires:
Wilson (CAN), Lopez (URU)

October 22, 2011
11:00

United States	0–2	Argentina
	Report	Bergner 34'; Lopez 52'

Pan American Hockey Stadium
Umpires:
Wilson (CAN), Wright (RSA)

October 24, 2011
2:00

Argentina	10–1	Cuba
Bergner 23', 27', 34'; Ibarra 25', 50', 62', 63'; Rossi 38'; Villa 67'; Villa 70'	Report	Blanco 13'

Pan American Hockey Stadium
Umpires:
Vatter (CHI), Lim (SIN)

Semi-finals

October 27, 2011
15:00

Chile	1–7	Argentina
Berczely 60'	Report	Bergner 7'; Villa 27', 65'; Rey 33'; Ibarra 34'; Villa 49', 69'

Pan American Hockey Stadium
Umpires:
Wilson (CAN), Lim (SIN)

Gold medal Match

October 29, 2011
17:30

Canada	1–3	Argentina
Tupper 25'	Report	Bergner 45'; Ibarra 49'; L. Vila 53'

Pan American Hockey Stadium
Umpires:
Wright (RSA), Hundley (USA)

2011 Pan American Games Gold medal

Argentina

=== Women ===
- Laura Aladro
- Luciana Aymar
- Noel Barrionuevo
- Silvina D'Elía
- Soledad García
- Rosario Luchetti
- Sofía Maccari
- Delfina Merino
- Carla Rebecchi
- Macarena Rodríguez
- Rocío Sánchez Moccia
- Mariela Scarone
- Daniela Sruoga
- María Josefina Sruoga
- Belén Succi
- Victoria Zuloaga

The Argentine women's team competed in Pool A.

Team	Pld	W	D	L	GF	GA	GD	Pts
Argentina (A)	3	3	0	0	37	3	+34	9
Canada (A)	3	2	0	1	15	8	+7	6
Barbados	3	1	0	2	4	31	−27	3
Trinidad and Tobago	3	0	0	3	3	17	−14	0

(A) Advanced to the semifinals

October 19, 2011
09:00

Trinidad and Tobago	0–11	Argentina
	Report	García 2', 22'; Rebecchi 6', 61'; Luchetti 15'; Barrionuevo 21', 37', 39', 58'; Rebecchi 29', 65'

Pan American Hockey Stadium
Umpires:
Metchette (IRL)
Sutton (USA)

October 21, 2011
16:00

Canada	3–7	Argentina
Culley 6'; Haughn 30'; Gillis 35'	Report	García 15', 25'; Aymar 16', 23'; Barrionuevo 41', 53'; Rebecchi 63'

Pan American Hockey Stadium
Umpires:
Metchette (IRL)
Montesino (CHI)

October 23, 2011
09:00

Argentina	19–0	Barbados
Rebecchi 2', 24', 53'; Aymar 4', 19, 61'; Barrionuevo 13', 65'; Merino 15'; Sruoga 20'; Sanchez 22'; García 23', 48', 50', 58'; Luchetti 31', 62'; Luchetti 42'; Maccari 56'	Report

Pan American Hockey Stadium
Umpires:
Sutton (USA),
Montesino (CHI)

Semi-finals

October 26, 2011
11:00

Argentina	4–0	Chile
Luchetti 5'; García 22'; Aymar 47'; Merino 56'	Report

Pan American Hockey Stadium
Umpires:
Stewart (CAN), Hudson (NZL)

Gold medal Match

October 28, 2011
17:30

Argentina	2–4	United States
Barrionuevo 19', 42'	Report	Selenski 14'; Taylor 16'; O'Donnell 35'; Vittese 66'

Pan American Hockey Stadium
Umpires:
Metchette (IRL), Stewart (CAN)

== Football ==
=== Men ===
- David Achucarro
- Esteban Andrada
- Sergio Araujo
- Ezequiel Cirigliano
- Fernando Coniglio
- Leonardo Ferreyra
- Franco Fragapane
- Leandro González Pírez
- Michael Hoyos
- Lucas Kruspzky
- Matías Laba
- Carlos Luque
- Adrián Martínez
- Hugo Nervo
- Germán Pezzella
- Rodrigo Rey
- Alan Ruíz
- Lucas Villafáñez

Men's team will participate in Group B of the football tournament.

Pos	Team	Pld	W	D	L	GF	GA	GD	Pts	Qualification
1	Argentina	3	2	1	0	5	1	+4	7	Advance to Semifinals
2	Costa Rica	3	2	0	1	4	4	0	6	Advance to Semifinals
3	Brazil	3	0	2	1	2	4	−2	2	
4	Cuba	3	0	1	2	0	2	−2	1	

October 19, 2011
17:00

Argentina	1–1	Brazil
Araujo 74'	Report	Henrique 63'

Estadio Omnilife, Guadalajara
Referee: Omar Ponce (Ecuador)

October 21, 2011
10:00

Costa Rica	0–3	Argentina
	Report	Fragapane 40'; Pezzella 60'; Kruspzky 76'

Estadio Omnilife, Guadalajara
Referee: David Gantar (Canada)

October 23, 2011
13:00

Cuba	0–1	Argentina
	Report	Laba 79'

Estadio Omnilife, Guadalajara
Referee: Erick Roberto Andino (Honduras)

==== Semi-finals ====
October 26, 2011
20:00

Argentina	1–0	Uruguay
Pezzella 9'	Report

Estadio Omnilife, Guadalajara
Referee: Omar Ponce (Ecuador)

==== Gold medal match ====
October 28, 2011
20:00

Mexico	1–0	Argentina
Amione 75'	Report

Estadio Omnilife, Guadalajara
Referee: Marlon Mejía (El Salvador)

=== Women ===
- Analía Almeida
- Estefanía Banini
- Gabriela Barrios
- Agustina Barroso
- María Gimena Blanco
- Gabriela Chávez
- Noelia Espíndola
- Marisa Farina
- Delfina Fernández
- Emilia Mendieta
- Elisabeth Minnig
- Andrea Ojeda
- Laurina Oliveros
- Mercedes Pereyra
- Belén Potassa
- María Quiñones
- Amancay Urbani
- Fabiana Vallejos

The women's team will participate in Group B of the football tournament.

Pos	Team	Pld	W	D	L	GF	GA	GD	Pts	Qualification
1	Brazil	3	2	1	0	4	1	+3	7	Advance to Semifinals
2	Canada	3	2	1	0	4	1	+3	7	Advance to Semifinals
3	Costa Rica	3	0	1	2	5	8	−3	1	
4	Argentina	3	0	1	2	3	6	−3	1	

October 18, 2011
17:00

Argentina	0–2	Brazil
	Report	Guedes 27'; Batista 37'

Estadio Omnilife, Guadalajara
Referee: Lucila Venegas (Mexico)

October 20, 2011
10:00

Canada	1–0	Argentina
Julien 48'	Report

Estadio Omnilife, Guadalajara
Referee: Yesli Rivas (El Salvador)

October 22, 2011
13:00

Costa Rica	3–3	Argentina
Acosta 57'; Rodríguez 76'; Alvarado 81'	Report	Pereyra 5'; Vallejos 8'; Ugalde 17' (o.g.)

Estadio Omnilife, Guadalajara

== Gymnastics ==
=== Artistic gymnastics ===
Six male athletes and three female athletes competed at the 2011 Pan American Games.

==== Men ====
Individual qualification & Team Finals

Athlete	Event	Apparatus						Qualification		Final	
Athlete	Event	Vault	Floor	Pommel horse	Rings	Parallel bars	Horizontal bar	Total	Rank	Total	Rank
Nicolás Córdoba	Ind Qualification	14.100	13.600	12.600	13.450	13.500	14.100	81.350	18th		
Juan Manuel Lompizano	Ind Qualification	14.550	13.550	13.500	11.650	13.550	13.050	79.850	23rd		
Osvaldo Martínez Erazun	Ind Qualification	14.700		12.100	14.550	13.900	13.950	69.200	34th		
Mauro Martínez	Ind Qualification	14.450	14.250		12.750			41.450	51st		
Juan Sebastián Melchiori	Ind Qualification		14.100	12.600		13.250	12.300	52.250	45th		
Federico Molinari	Ind Qualification	15.300	13.700	13.100	14.450	12.900	13.400	82.850	12th		
Team Totals; Four Best Scores	Team All-around	59.000	55.650	51.800	55.200	54.200	54.500			330.350	7th

Individual Finals

Athlete	Event	Final							
Athlete	Event	Vault	Floor	Pommel horse	Rings	Parallel bars	Horizontal bar	Total	Rank
Federico Molinari	Individual All-around	15.250	13.700	12.700	14.550	14.050	11.800	82.050	10th
Federico Molinari	Individual Rings				13.975			13.975	8th
Nicolás Córdoba	Individual All-around	14.150	13.700	12.200	13.550	13.200	14.500	81.300	12th
Nicolás Córdoba	Individual Horizontal Bar						13.125	13.125	8th
Osvaldo Martínez Erazun	Individual Rings				14.400			14.400	6th

==== Women ====
Individual qualification & Team Finals

Athlete	Event	Apparatus				Qualification		Final	
Athlete	Event	Vault	Floor	Balance Beam	Uneven bars	Total	Rank	Total	Rank
Lucila Estarli	Ind Qualification	13.725	12.375	12.625	10.475	49.200	32nd		
Belén Stoffel	Ind Qualification	13.050	11.600	11.150	10.800	46.600	39th		
Merlina Galera	Ind Qualification	13.400	13.025	12.525	10.675	49.625	30th		
Agustina Estarli	Ind Qualification	12.425	12.150	10.800	11.725	47.100	37th		
Team Totals	Team All-around	52.600	49.150	47.100	43.675			192.525	8th

Individual Finals

Athlete	Event	Final					
Athlete	Event	Vault	Floor	Balance Beam	Uneven bars	Total	Rank
Merlina Galera	Individual All-around	13.425	12.550	12.675	11.375	50.025	15th
Lucila Estarli	Individual All-around	13.700	12.225	12.775	10.650	49.350	16th

=== Rhythmic gymnastics ===
Two Argentine athletes qualified to compete in the individual event of rhythmic gymnastics at the 2011 Pan American Games.

==== Individual ====
Athlete	Event	Final					
Athlete	Event	Hoop	Ball	Clubs	Ribbon	Total	Rank
Darya Shara	Individual all-around	23.825	23.000	23.600	23.800	94.225	5th
Darya Shara	Hoop	23.900				23.900	6th
Darya Shara	Ball		22.700			22.700	8th
Darya Shara	Clubs			24.200		24.200	4th
Darya Shara	Ribbon				24.400	24.400	4th
Ana Carrasco	Individual all-around	23.525	23.575	21.600	23.600	92.300	8th
Ana Carrasco	Hoop	24.075				24.075	5th
Ana Carrasco	Ball		23.725			23.725	6th
Ana Carrasco	Ribbon				24.600	24.600	3rd place, bronze medalist(s)

== Handball ==
=== Men ===
- Gonzalo Carou
- Federico Fernández
- Juan Pablo Fernández
- Fernando García
- Andrés Kogovsek
- Damián Migueles
- Federico Pizarro
- Cristian Platti
- Pablo Portela
- Leonardo Facundo Querín
- Matías Schulz
- Diego Simonet
- Sebastián Simonet
- Juan Vidal
- Federico Vieyra

The Argentine men's team competed in Group B.

Group B

Pos	Team	Pld	W	D	L	GF	GA	GD	Pts	Qualification
1	Argentina	3	3	0	0	95	55	+40	6	Semifinals
2	Dominican Republic	3	2	0	1	77	79	−2	4	Semifinals
3	Mexico (H)	3	1	0	2	78	93	−15	2	5th–8th place semifinals
4	United States	3	0	0	3	73	96	−23	0	5th–8th place semifinals

Source: Guadalajara 2011
Rules for classification: 1) points; 2) head-to-head points; 3) head-to-head goal difference; 4) head-to-head goals scored; 5) goal difference; 6) goals scored; 7) draw.
(H) Hosts

October 16; 20:00	Argentina	31–16	Mexico	San Rafael Gymnasium; Referees: Sabroso, Raluy (ESP)
October 16; 20:00	2 players, 6	Report	Acuña, 6	San Rafael Gymnasium; Referees: Sabroso, Raluy (ESP)

October 18; 15:00	United States	19–36	Argentina	San Rafael Gymnasium; Referees: Martin, Pellerin (CAN)
October 18; 15:00	Hines, 6	Report	Pizarro, 8	San Rafael Gymnasium; Referees: Martin, Pellerin (CAN)

October 20; 18:00	Argentina	28–20	Dominican Republic	San Rafael Gymnasium; Referees: Sabroso, Raluy (ESP)
October 20; 18:00	Two players, 6	Report	Mirabal, 6	San Rafael Gymnasium; Referees: Sabroso, Raluy (ESP)

Semi-finals

October 22; 20:00	Chile	25–26	Argentina	San Rafael Gymnasium; Referees: Pinto, Meneses (BRA)
October 22; 20:00	Salinas, 7	Report	Fernández, 8	San Rafael Gymnasium; Referees: Pinto, Meneses (BRA)

Gold medal Match

October 24; 20:00	Brazil	23–26	Argentina	San Rafael Gymnasium; Referees: Sabroso, Raluy (ESP)
October 24; 20:00	Ribeiro, 6	Report	Fernández, 6	San Rafael Gymnasium; Referees: Sabroso, Raluy (ESP)

2011 Pan American Games Gold medal

Argentina

=== Women ===
- María Amelia Belotti
- Valeria Bianchi
- María Decilio
- Bibiana Ferrea
- Lucía Haro
- Valentina Kogan
- Antonela Mena
- Luciana Mendoza
- Manuela Pizzo
- María Romero
- Noelia Sala
- Luciana Salvado
- Silvina Schlesinger
- Solange Tagliavini
- Silvana Totolo

The Argentine women's team competed in Group A.

Group A

Pos	Team	Pld	W	D	L	GF	GA	GD	Pts	Qualification
1	Argentina	3	3	0	0	87	60	+27	6	Semifinals
2	Mexico (H)	3	2	0	1	55	63	−8	4	Semifinals
3	Puerto Rico	3	1	0	2	76	84	−8	2	5th–8th place semifinals
4	Chile	3	0	0	3	63	74	−11	0	5th–8th place semifinals

Source: Guadalajara 2011
Rules for classification: 1) points; 2) head-to-head points; 3) head-to-head goal difference; 4) head-to-head goals scored; 5) goal difference; 6) goals scored; 7) draw.
(H) Hosts

October 15; 15:00	Argentina	35–26	Puerto Rico	San Rafael Gymnasium; Referees: De Souza, Damaceno (BRA)
October 15; 15:00		Report		San Rafael Gymnasium; Referees: De Souza, Damaceno (BRA)

October 17; 15:00	Chile	20–28	Argentina	San Rafael Gymnasium; Referees: De Souza, Damaceno (BRA)
October 17; 15:00	Feuchtmann, 7	Report	2 players, 6	San Rafael Gymnasium; Referees: De Souza, Damaceno (BRA)

October 19; 20:00	Argentina	24–14	Mexico	San Rafael Gymnasium
October 19; 20:00	Decilio, 7	Report	Flores, 4	San Rafael Gymnasium

Semi-finals

October 21; 20:00	Argentina	19–18	Dominican Republic	San Rafael Gymnasium; Referees: Raluy, Sabroso (ESP)
October 21; 20:00	Tagliavini, 3	Report	Granado Brito, 8	San Rafael Gymnasium; Referees: Raluy, Sabroso (ESP)

Gold medal Match

October 23; 20:00	Brazil	33–15	Argentina	San Rafael Gymnasium
October 23; 20:00		Report		San Rafael Gymnasium

2011 Pan American Games Silver medal

Argentina

== Judo ==
Argentina qualified eleven athletes, five male and six female athletes, to compete in all men's and women's judo competitions.

=== Men ===
Athlete	Event	Round of 16	Quarterfinals	Semi-finals	Final
Athlete	Event	Opposition Result	Opposition Result	Opposition Result	Opposition Result
Alejandro Clara	-73 kg		L Mata (MEX); W 003 – 001	R Girones (CUB); W 010 – 001	B Silva (BRA); L 000 – 100 (silver)
Emmanuel Lucenti	-81 kg		A Valois (CAN); L 001 – 100	Did not advance (to repechage round)	
Héctor Fernando Campos	-90 kg		J Larsen (USA); L 010 – 100	Did not advance (to repechage round)	
Cristian Adolfo Schmidt	-100 kg		D Ochoa (ESA); W 110 – 001	O Despaigne (CUB); L 001 – 010	Did not advance (to repechage round)
Orlando Atilio Baccino	+100 kg		R Flores (MEX); L 000 – 001	Did not advance (to repechage round)	

Repechage Rounds

Athlete	Event	First Repechage Round	Repechage Quarterfinals	Repechage Semi-finals	Bronze Final
Athlete	Event	Opposition Result	Opposition Result	Opposition Result	Opposition Result
Emmanuel Lucenti	-81 kg			G Velazco (PER); W 100 – 000	M Rodriguez (VEN); W 100 – 000 (bronze)
Héctor Fernando Campos	-90 kg			R Romo (CHI); L 000 – 100	Did not advance
Cristian Adolfo Schmidt	-100 kg				C Santiago (PUR); W 100 – 001 (bronze)
Orlando Atilio Baccino	+100 kg		E Acuna (VEN); W 100 – 000	A Turner Jr (USA); L 000 – 102	Did not advance

=== Women ===
Athlete	Event	Round of 16	Quarterfinals	Semi-finals	Final
Athlete	Event	Opposition Result	Opposition Result	Opposition Result	Opposition Result
Paula Pareto	-48 kg	Lesly Carolyn Cano (PER); W 110 – 000	Luz Adiela Alvarez (COL); W 002 – 000 S2	Edna Carrillo (MEX); W 113 S3 – 010 S2	Dayaris Rosa Mestre (CUB); W 110 S2 – 001 S1 (gold)
Oritia Del Carmen González	-52 kg		Anrriquelys Barrios (VEN); W 011 – 000 S3	Érika Miranda (BRA); L 000 S1 – 100 S1	Did not advance (to repechage round)
Melisa Rodríguez	-57 kg		H Carmichael (USA); W 100 – 000	Y Lupetey (CUB); L 000 – 111	Did not advance (to repechage round)
Mariana Soledad López	-63 kg	J Garcia (PUR); L 001 – 002	Did not advance		
Lorena Briceño	-78 kg		M Nolberto (GUA); W 002 – 001	C Roberge (CAN); L 000 – 100	Did not advance (to repechage round)
Samantha Kessler	+78 kg		V Zambotti (MEX); L 000 – 111	Did not advance (to repechage round)	

Repechage Rounds

Athlete	Event	First Repechage Round	Repechage Quarterfinals	Repechage Semi-finals	Bronze Final
Athlete	Event	Opposition Result	Opposition Result	Opposition Result	Opposition Result
Oritia Del Carmen González	-52 kg				Yulieth Sánchez (COL); L 010 S4 – 100 S1 GS
Melisa Rodríguez	-57 kg				J Melançon (CAN); L 000 – 100
Lorena Briceño	-78 kg				M Da Silva (BRA); L 0 – 100
Samantha Kessler	+78 kg			E O'Rourke (USA); L 0 – 101	Did not advance

== Karate ==
Three Argentine athletes qualified to participate at the 2011 Pan American Games, one male and two females.

Athlete	Event	Round robin (Pool A/B)			Semi-finals	Final
Athlete	Event	Match 1	Match 2	Match 3	Semi-finals	Final
Athlete	Event	Opposition Result	Opposition Result	Opposition Result	Opposition Result	Opposition Result
Franco Recouso	Men's +84 kg	W Barbosa (BRA); L 1 – 2	J Merino (ESA); L 0 – 1	A Aponte (VEN); L 0 – 1	Did not advance	
María Virginia Acevedo	Women's −61 kg	M Verspaget (AHO); L 1 – 5	A Montilla (DOM); L 0 – 2	B Gutierrez (MEX); L 0 – 4	Did not advance	
Perla Salazar	Women's +68 kg	X Caballero (MEX); L 0 – 2	R Zavala (PUR); W 2 – 1	M Castellanos (GUA); L 0 – 6	Did not advance	

== Modern pentathlon ==
Argentina qualified two male and two female pentathletes.

=== Men ===
Athlete	Fencing (épée one touch)			Swimming (200m freestyle)			Riding (show jumping)			Combined			Total points	Final rank
Athlete	Results	Rank	MP points	Time	Rank	MP points	Penalties	Rank	MP points	Time	Rank	MP points	Total points	Final rank
Sergio Villamayor	14 V – 10 D	10th	880	2:25.48	22nd	1056	-	1st	1200	12:33.54	17th	1988	5124	16th
Emmanuel Zapata	14 V – 10 D	7th	892	2:09.98	7th	1244	-	5th	1200	11:25.58	7th	2256	5592	5th

=== Women ===
Athlete	Fencing (épée one touch)			Swimming (200m freestyle)			Riding (show jumping)			Combined			Total points	Final rank
Athlete	Results	Rank	MP points	Time	Rank	MP points	Penalties	Rank	MP points	Time	Rank	MP points	Total points	Final rank
Ayelén Zapata	10 V – 22 D	16th	664	2:37.97	16th	908	20	5th	1180	14:23.84	13th	1548	4180	13th
Pamela Zapata	19 V – 13 D	5th	916	2:33.34	13th	960	28	6th	1172	13:46.53	8th	1696	4744	8th

== Racquetball ==
Argentina qualified three male and two female racquetball players.

=== Men ===
Athlete	Event	Preliminary round (3)	Round of 16	Quarterfinals	Semi-finals	Final	
Athlete	Event	Opposition Score	Opposition Score	Opposition Score	Opposition Score	Opposition Score	Rank
Daniel Maggi; Shai Manzuri	Doubles	De Leon (Dominican Republic) Perez (DOM); W 15 – 11, 15 – 11; Banegas (Honduras) Cruz (HON); W 15 – 12, 15 – 9 Landeryou (Canada) Odegard (CAN); L 10 – 15, 5 – 15		C Crowther (United States) S Vanderson (USA); L 9 – 15, 6 – 15	Did not advance		
Daniel Maggi; Shai Manzuri	Team		Costa Rica; W 2 – 0, 1 – 2, 2 – 0	Mexico; L 0 – 2, 0 – 2	Did not advance		

=== Women ===
Athlete	Event	Preliminary round (2 or 3)	Round of 16	Quarterfinals	Semi-finals	Final	
Athlete	Event	Opposition Score	Opposition Score	Opposition Score	Opposition Score	Opposition Score	Rank
Veronique Guillemette	Singles	Saunders (CAN); L 2 – 15, 8 – 15; Daza (BOL); L 14 – 15, 10 – 15; Paredes (VEN); W 15 – 9, 15 – 10	Tobon (VEN); L 0 – 15, 0 – 15	Did not advance			
Veronique Guillemette; Dafne Macrino	Doubles	Loma (Bolivia) Daza (BOL); L 4 – 15, 9 – 15; Maitre (Canada) Jacobson (CAN); W 15 – 10, 15 – 0		Grisar (Chile) Munoz (CHI); L 12 – 15, 6 – 15	Did not advance		
Veronique Guillemette; Dafne Macrino	Team		Venezuela; L 2 – 0, 0 – 2, 1 – 2	Did not advance			

== Roller skating ==
Argentina qualified three male and three female roller skaters.

=== Men ===
Athlete	Event	Qualification		Final	
Athlete	Event	Result	Rank	Result	Rank
Juan Cruz Araldi	300 m time trial			25.703	3rd place, bronze medalist(s)
Ezequiel Capellano	1,000 m	1:27.949	2nd	1:25.973	2nd place, silver medalist(s)
Ezequiel Capellano	10,000 m			19	2nd place, silver medalist(s)

Artistic

Athlete	Event	Short program		Long program	
Athlete	Event	Result	Rank	Result	Rank
Daniel Arriola	Free skating	123.70	2nd	129.80	2nd place, silver medalist(s)

=== Women ===
Athlete	Event	Qualification		Final	
Athlete	Event	Result	Rank	Result	Rank
María Victoria Rodríguez	300 m time trial			27.491	4th
Melisa Bonnet	1,000 m	1:38.512	7th	1:35.439	3rd place, bronze medalist(s)
Melisa Bonnet	10,000 m			23	2nd place, silver medalist(s)

Artistic

Athlete	Event	Short program		Long program	
Athlete	Event	Result	Rank	Result	Rank
Elizabeth Soler	Free skating	128.50	1st	129.30	1st place, gold medalist(s)

== Rowing ==
=== Men ===
Athlete(s)	Event	Heats		Repechage		Final	
Athlete(s)	Event	Time	Rank	Time	Rank	Time	Rank
Cristian Rosso	Single sculls (M1x)	7:36.93	8th	7:16.07	1st	7:15.91	5th
Cristian Rosso; Ariel Suárez	Double sculls (M2x)	6:50.94	3rd			6:26.55	1st place, gold medalist(s)
Mario Cejas; Miguel Mayol	Lightweight double sculls (LM2x)	6:56.42	7th	6:46.87	2nd	6:36.79	6th
Alejandro Cucchietti; Santiago Fernández; Cristian Rosso; Ariel Suárez	Quadruple sculls (M4x)	6:15.62	2nd			5:51.20	1st place, gold medalist(s)
Sebastián Claus; Diego López	Coxless pair (M2-)	6:47.82	4th	7:17.17	3rd	Did not advance	
Sebastián Fernández; Joaquín Iwan; Rodrigo Murillo; Agustin Silvestro	Coxless four (M4-)	6:07.13	1st			6:04.41	1st place, gold medalist(s)
Nicolai Fernández; Diego Gallina; Carlo Lauro; Pablo Mahnic	Lightweight coxless four (LM4-)	6:06.62	1st			6:06.21	2nd place, silver medalist(s)
Sebastián Claus; Sebastián Fernández; Joel Infante; Joaquín Iwan; Diego López; Rodrigo Murillo; Ariel Suárez; Nicolás Silvestro; Mariano Sosa	Coxed eight (M8+)	6:17.73	4th			5:41.77	3rd place, bronze medalist(s)

=== Women ===
Athlete(s)	Event	Heats		Repechage		Final	
Athlete(s)	Event	Time	Rank	Time	Rank	Time	Rank
María Gabriela Best	Single sculls (W1x)	7:54.05	2nd			7:55.55	2nd place, silver medalist(s)
Déborah Lince	Lightweight single sculls (LW1x)	8:48.33	6th	8:11.15	3rd	8:07.63	5th
Milka Kraljev; María Clara Rohner	Double sculls (W2x)	7:33.23	4th	8:20.65	4th	7:22.10	6th
Sofía Esteras; Carolina Schiffmacher	Lightweight double sculls (LW2x)	7:33.90	4th			7:24.05	4th
María Laura Abalo; María Gabriela Best; Milka Kraljev; María Clara Rohner	Quadruple sculls (W4x)	7:00.86	2nd			6:34.46	1st place, gold medalist(s)
María Laura Abalo; María Gabriela Best	Coxless pair (W2-)	7:36.22	2nd			7:24.57	1st place, gold medalist(s)

== Rugby sevens ==
Argentina qualified a team to participate in rugby sevens. The team consisted of twelve athletes and competed in Group B.

Team

- Gabriel Ascárate
- Santiago Bottini
- Nicolás Bruzzone
- Francisco Cuneo
- Gonzalo Gutiérrez Taboada
- Joaquín Luccheti
- Francisco Merello
- Manuel Montero
- Ramiro Moyano
- Javier Ortega
- Diego Palma
- Gastón Revol

Team	Pld	W	D	L	PF	PA	PD	Pts
Argentina	3	3	0	0	92	15	+77	12
Uruguay	3	2	0	1	52	26	+26	9
Guyana	3	1	0	2	12	65	−53	6
Mexico	3	0	0	3	10	60	−50	3

October 29, 2011
11:50

Argentina	26 – 5	Mexico
	Report

Tlaquepaque Stadium, Guadalajara

October 29, 2011
14:00

Argentina	40 – 0	Guyana
	Report

Tlaquepaque Stadium, Guadalajara

October 29, 2011
16:05

Argentina	26 – 10	Uruguay
	Report

Tlaquepaque Stadium, Guadalajara

=== Quarter-finals ===
October 30, 2011
9:00

Argentina	21 – 5	Chile
	Report

Tlaquepaque Stadium, Guadalajara

=== Semi-finals ===
October 30, 2011
12:00

Argentina	17 – 5	Uruguay
	Report

Tlaquepaque Stadium, Guadalajara

=== Gold medal match ===
October 30, 2011
15:00

Argentina	24 – 26	Canada
	Report

Tlaquepaque Stadium, Guadalajara

2011 Pan American Games Silver medal

Argentina

== Sailing ==
Argentina qualified nine boats and sixteen athletes to compete in all tournaments.

=== Men ===
Athlete	Event	Race											Net points	Final rank
Athlete	Event	1	2	3	4	5	6	7	8	9	10	M	Net points	Final rank
Mariano Reutemann	Windsurfer (RS:X)	1	2	2	(3)	1	2	2	3	1	3	4	21	2nd place, silver medalist(s)
Julio Alsogaray	Single-handed Dinghy (Laser)	3	1	3	3	1	6	2	2	3	(7)	6	30	1st place, gold medalist(s)

=== Women ===
Athlete	Event	Race											Net points	Final rank
Athlete	Event	1	2	3	4	5	6	7	8	9	10	M	Net points	Final rank
Jazmín Lopez Becker	Windsurfer (RS:X)	5	4	4	5	5	(6)	3	3	5	5	8	47	5th
Cecilia Carranza Saroli	Single-handed Dinghy (Laser Radial)	2	3	1	1	1	(5)	3	2	1	3	8	25	1st place, gold medalist(s)

=== Open ===
Athlete	Event	Race											Net points	Final rank
Athlete	Event	1	2	3	4	5	6	7	8	9	10	M	Net points	Final rank
Lucas González Smith; Moira González Smith	Multihull (Hobie 16)	6	6	7	4	5	6	8	(9)	5	6	/	53	8th
Rafael De Martis; Juan Gerónimo Galván; Carlos Alfredo Lacchini; Francisco Van Avermaete	Keelboat (J/24)	4	(6)	4	2	3	2	3	4	6	6	8	42	5th
Juan Alejandro Cloos; Carlos De Mare; Julián Augusto De Mare	Multi-crewed Dinghy (Lightning)	(6)	5	2	3	1	4	6	(7)	5	6	/	38	6th
Cecilia Granucci; Luis Soubié	Double-handed Dinghy (Snipe)	4	7	(9)	9	5	2	9	2	6	2	/	46	6th
Francisco Renna	Single-handed Dinghy (Sunfish)	5	3	(12)	1	3	6	9	6	5	4	6	48	3rd place, bronze medalist(s)

== Shooting ==
=== Men ===
Event	Athlete	Qualification		Final	
Event	Athlete	Score	Rank	Score	Rank
10 m air pistol	Agustin Falco	562- 7x	19th	Did not advance	
10 m air pistol	Matías Orozco	563-14x	18th	Did not advance	
10 m air rifle	Pablo Damián Alvárez	586-35x	6th	586-35x	7th
10 m air rifle	Marcelo Zoccali Albizu	583-39x	10th	Did not advance	
25 m rapid fire pistol	Daniel César Felizia	556- 7x	8th	Did not advance	
50 m pistol	Néstor Juan Godoy	529- 9x	20th	Did not advance	
50 m pistol	Maximino Modesti	533- 6x	16th	Did not advance	
50 m rifle 3 positions	Pablo Damián Alvárez	1136- 49x	11th	Did not advance	
50 m rifle 3 positions	Juan Diego Angeloni	1125- 40x	15th	Did not advance	
50 m rifle prone	Alex Misael Suligoy	9.833	2nd	590-42x	2nd place, silver medalist(s)
50 m rifle prone	Ángel Rosendo Velarte	9.817	3rd	589-32x	5th
Trap	Carlos Belletini	116	11th	Did not advance	
Trap	Fernando Borello	110	19th	Did not advance	
Skeet	Fernando Gazzotti	111	22nd	Did not advance	
Skeet	Federico Gil	112	21st	Did not advance	

=== Women ===
Event	Athlete	Qualification		Final	
Event	Athlete	Score	Rank	Score	Rank
10 m air rifle	Maria de los Reyes Cardellino	378-13x	27th	Did not advance	
10 m air rifle	Amelia Fournel	386-21x	15th	Did not advance	
50 m rifle 3 positions	Amelia Fournel	565-15x	10th	Did not advance	
50 m rifle 3 positions	Cecilia Elena Zeid	569-25x	4th	656.2	8th
Skeet	Melisa Gil	65	3rd	88	3rd place, bronze medalist(s)

== Softball ==
Argentina qualified a softball team. The team was made up of seventeen athletes.

Team

- María Althabe
- María Angeletti
- Florencia Aranda
- Ana Sofía Bollea
- Andrea Brito
- Mariana Carrizo
- Magali Frezzotti
- Aldana Gómez
- Natalia Jiménez
- Maria Mallaviabarrena
- Paula Morbelli
- María Olheiser
- Bárbara Perna
- María Pividori
- Virginia Sciuto
- María Vega
- Carla Villalva

Standings

Qualified for the semifinals
Eliminated

All times are Central Daylight Time (UTC−5)

Rank	Team	W	L	RS	RA
1	United States	7	0	54	6
2	Cuba	5	2	28	13
3	Venezuela	5	2	31	20
4	Canada	5	2	46	23
5	Dominican Republic	2	5	22	37
6	Mexico	2	5	18	37
7	Puerto Rico	2	5	27	42
8	Argentina	0	7	4	59

October 17, 2011; 13:00	Argentina	0–7	Cuba	Pan American Softball Stadium, Guadalajara
October 17, 2011; 13:00		http://200.57.183.69/ENG/SO/SOR173A_SOW40040010100023ENG.htm		Pan American Softball Stadium, Guadalajara

October 18, 2011; 9:00	Venezuela	8–1	Argentina	Pan American Softball Stadium, Guadalajara
October 18, 2011; 9:00		http://200.57.183.69/ENG/SO/SOR173A_SOW40040010100019ENG.htm		Pan American Softball Stadium, Guadalajara

October 19, 2011; 9:00	Canada	11–0	Argentina	Pan American Softball Stadium, Guadalajara
October 19, 2011; 9:00		http://200.57.183.69/ENG/SO/SOR173A_SOW40040010100025ENG.htm		Pan American Softball Stadium, Guadalajara

October 19, 2011; 11:00	Argentina	1–11	Dominican Republic	Pan American Softball Stadium, Guadalajara
October 19, 2011; 11:00		http://200.57.183.69/ENG/SO/SOR173A_SOW40040010100004ENG.htm		Pan American Softball Stadium, Guadalajara

October 20, 2011; 9:00	Puerto Rico	10–0	Argentina	Pan American Softball Stadium, Guadalajara
October 20, 2011; 9:00		http://200.57.183.69/ENG/SO/SOR173A_SOW40040010100010ENG.htm		Pan American Softball Stadium, Guadalajara

October 20, 2011; 16:00	Mexico	4–2	Argentina	Pan American Softball Stadium, Guadalajara
October 20, 2011; 16:00		http://200.57.183.69/ENG/SO/SOR173A_SOW40040010100015ENG.htm		Pan American Softball Stadium, Guadalajara

October 21, 2011; 16:00	United States	8–0	Argentina	Pan American Softball Stadium, Guadalajara
October 21, 2011; 16:00		http://200.57.183.69/ENG/SO/SOR173A_SOW40040010100024ENG.htm		Pan American Softball Stadium, Guadalajara

2011 Pan American Games 8th

Argentina

== Squash ==
Argentina qualified six athletes to compete in all tournaments, including both male and female team's competition.

=== Men ===
Athlete	Event	Preliminary round	Round of 32	Round of 16	Quarterfinals	Semi-finals	Final	
Athlete	Event	Opposition Score	Opposition Score	Opposition Score	Opposition Score	Opposition Score	Opposition Score	Rank
Hernán D'Arcangelo	Singles		A Escudero (PER); W 13–11, 11–4, 11–3	M Rodríguez (COL); L 7–11, 7–11, 9–11	Did not advance			
Gonzalo Miranda	Singles			A Duany (PER); W 11–4, 11–7, 11–3	M Rodríguez (COL); L 13–15, 3–11, 2–11	Did not advance		
Hernán D'Arcangelo; Robertino Pezzota	Doubles				V De Lima (BRA); R Fernandes (BRA); W 8–11, 11–9, 11–5	A Salazar (MEX); E Gálvez (MEX); L 4–11, 6–11	Did not advance	3rd place, bronze medalist(s)

Athletes	Event	Preliminaries Group stage			Quarterfinal	Semi-final	Final	Rank
Athletes	Event	Opposition Result	Opposition Result	Opposition Result	Opposition Result	Opposition Result	Opposition Result	Rank
Hernán D'Arcangelo; Robertino Pezzota; Gonzalo Miranda	Team	Peru; W 0–3, 3–0, 3–1	Paraguay; W 3–1, 3–2, 3–0	Brazil; L 1–3, 1–3, 2–3	United States; L 2–3, 0–3	Did not advance		

=== Women ===
Athlete	Event	Preliminary round	First round	Round of 16	Quarterfinals	Semi-finals	Final	
Athlete	Event	Opposition Score	Opposition Score	Opposition Score	Opposition Score	Opposition Score	Opposition Score	Rank
Antonella Falcione	Singles		W Bonilla (GUA); W 11–6, 11–3, 11–1	N Fernandes (GUY); L 8–11, 6–11, 7–11	Did not advance			
Cecilia Cerquetti	Singles			S Cornett (CAN); L 5–11, 3–11, 3–11	Did not advance			
Cecilia Cerquetti; Antonella Falcione	Doubles				S Terán (MEX); N Hernandez (MEX); L 7 – 11, 5 – 11	Did not advance		

Athletes	Event	Preliminaries Group stage			Quarterfinal	Semi-final	Final	Rank
Athletes	Event	Opposition Result	Opposition Result	Opposition Result	Opposition Result	Opposition Result	Opposition Result	Rank
Cecilia Cerquetti; Antonella Falcione; Fernanda Rocha	Team	Mexico; L 0 – 3, 0 – 3, 0 – 3	United States; L 1 – 3, 0 – 3, 3 – 2	Brazil; L 2 – 3, 2 – 3, 1 – 3	Did not advance			

== Swimming ==
=== Men ===
Event	Athletes	Heats		Final	
Event	Athletes	Time	Position	Time	Position
50 m freestyle	Lucas del Piccolo	23.02	10th	Did not advance	
50 m freestyle	Federico Grabich	22.87	7th	22.97	8th
100 m freestyle	Federico Grabich	50.20	9th	Did not advance	
200 m freestyle	Federico Grabich	1:55.90	19th	Did not advance	
400 m freestyle	Martín Naidich	3:56.81	3rd	3:56.77	7th
400 m freestyle	Juan Martín Pereyra	3:58.10	6th	3:52.71	4th
1500 m freestyle	Martín Naidich	15:49.51	7th	15:46.98	7th
1500 m freestyle	Juan Martín Pereyra	15:40.44	5th	15:26.20	3rd place, bronze medalist(s)
100 m backstroke	Federico Grabich	56.00	5th	55.22	5th
100 m breaststroke	Rodrigo Frutos	1:04.34	13th	Did not advance	
100 m breaststroke	Lucas Peralta	1:03.40	10th	Did not advance	
200 m breaststroke	Lucas Peralta	2:24.04	11th	Did not advance	
200 m breaststroke	Rodrigo Frutos	2:24.51	12th	Did not advance	
100 m butterfly	Marcos Barale	55.31	14th	Did not advance	
200 m butterfly	Andrés González	2:05.29	12th	Did not advance	
400 m individual medley	Esteban Paz	4:34.08	6th	4:37.67	8th
4 × 200 m freestyle relay	Federico Grabich; Esteban Paz; Martín Naidich; Juan Martín Pereyra	7:54.27	6th	7:36.37	4th
4 × 100 m medley relay	Federico Grabich; Lucas Peralta; Marcos Barale; Lucas del Piccolo	3:51.18	4th	3:44.51	3rd place, bronze medalist(s)
10 km marathon	Guillermo Bértola			1:57:33.9	3rd place, bronze medalist(s)
10 km marathon	Damián Blaum			2:05:00.5	11th

=== Women ===
Event	Athletes	Heats		Final	
Event	Athletes	Time	Position	Time	Position
50 m freestyle	Nadia Colovini	26.04	7th	26.08	7th
100 m freestyle	Nadia Colovini	56.66	6th	56.53	8th
200 m freestyle	Virginia Bardach	2:05.99	9th	Did not advance	
400 m freestyle	Cecilia Biagioli	4:16.96	5th	4:15.41	5th
400 m freestyle	Virginia Bardach	4:30.23	15th	Did not advance	
800 m freestyle	Virginia Bardach	9:10.06	11th	Did not advance	
100 m backstroke	Cecilia Bertoncello	1:04.53	9th	Did not advance	
100 m backstroke	Florencia Perotti	1:04.94	11th	Did not advance	
200 m backstroke	Florencia Perotti	2:24.78	12th	Did not advance	
100 m breaststroke	Mijal Asís	1:14.71	17th	Did not advance	
100 m breaststroke	Julia Sebastián	1:12.88	8th	1:12.60	8th
200 m breaststroke	Mijal Asís	2:35.85	8th	2:35.21	8th
200 m breaststroke	Julia Sebastián	2:35.12	6th	2:32.74	6th
100 m butterfly	Cecilia Bertoncello	1:03.31	12th	Did not advance	
200 m individual medley	Georgina Bardach	2:20.57	5th	2:22.65	7th
200 m individual medley	Julia Arino	2:23.74	10th	Did not advance	
400 m individual medley	Georgina Bardach	4:57.58	4th	4:53.81	5th
400 m individual medley	Julia Arino	5:06.78	9th	Did not advance	
4 × 100 m freestyle	Virginia Bardach; Florencia Perotti; Nadia Colovini; Cecilia Biagioli	3:58.61	7th	3:51.90	6th
4 × 200 m freestyle	Georgina Bardach; Julia Arino; Nadia Colovini; Virginia Bardach	9:09.18	7th	8:38.96	6th
4 × 100 m medley	Florencia Perotti; Julia Sebastián; Nadia Colovini; Georgina Bardach	4:27.43	7th	4:16.18	5th
10 km marathon	Cecilia Biagioli			2:04:11.5	1st place, gold medalist(s)
10 km marathon	Pilar Geijo			2:07:00.2	10th

== Synchronized Swimming ==
Argentina qualified a team and a duet to participate in the synchronized swimming competition.

Athlete	Event	Technical Routine		Free Routine (Final)			
Athlete	Event	Points	Rank	Points	Rank	Total points	Rank
Etel Sánchez; Sofía Sánchez	Women's duet	39.488	6th	39.750	6th	79.238	6th
Florencia Arce; Irina Bandurek; Sofía Boasso; Sofía Ferrer; Maite Guraya; Brenda Moller; Etel Sánchez; Sofía Sánchez; Lucina Simón	Women's team	76.375	6th	76.363	6th	152.738	6th

== Table tennis ==
Argentina qualified 3 table tennis players, which also conform the men's team.

Athlete	Event	Round robin			Round of 16	Quarter-finals	Semi-finals	Final	Rank
Athlete	Event	Match 1	Match 2	Match 3	Round of 16	Quarter-finals	Semi-finals	Final	Rank
Athlete	Event	Opposition Result	Opposition Result	Opposition Result	Opposition Result	Opposition Result	Opposition Result	Opposition Result	Rank
Gastón Alto	Singles	A Carlier (CHI); W 4 – 2	J Ramirez (GUA); L 2 – 4	P Thériault (CAN); W 4 – 3	Did not advance				
Liu Song	Singles	A Rodríguez (CHI); W 4 – 1	M Navas (VEN); W 4 – 0	H Gatica (GUA); W 4 – 0	D St. Louis (TRI); W 4 – 1	A Pereira (CUB); W 4 – 2	A Mino (COL); W 4 – 1	M Madrid (MEX); W 4 – 1	1st place, gold medalist(s)
Pablo Tabachnik	Singles	J Campos (CUB); L 3 – 4	M Madrid (MEX); L 2 – 4	J Vila (DOM); W 4 – 2	Did not advance				
Pablo Tabachnik; Liu Song; Gastón Alto	Team	Chile; W 3 – 0, 3 – 0, 3 – 2	United States; W 3 – 0, 1 – 3, 2 – 3,3 – 0, 3 – 2			Venezuela; W 3 – 1, 3 – 2, 3 – 0	Mexico; W 2 – 3, 3 – 1, 3 – 1, 0 – 3, 3 – 2	Brazil; L 0 – 3, 1 – 3, 3 – 1, 1 – 3	2nd place, silver medalist(s)

== Taekwondo ==
Argentina qualified six athletes to compete in taekwondo events.

=== Men ===
Athlete	Event	Round of 16	Quarterfinals	Semi-finals	Final	Rank
Athlete	Event	Opposition Result	Opposition Result	Opposition Result	Opposition Result	Rank
Leandro García	Featherweight (−68kg)	P López (PER); L 3 – 4	Did not advance			
Sebastián Crismanich	Welterweight (−80kg)	M Rodriguez (NCA); W 12 – 0	S Michaud (CAN); W KO	S Solorzano (GUA); W 8 – 1	C Vasquez (VEN); W 12 – 9	1st place, gold medalist(s)
Martín Sío	Heavyweight (+80kg)	S Pérez (MEX); L 6 – 7	Did not advance			

=== Women ===
Athlete	Event	Round of 16	Quarterfinals	Semi-finals	Final
Athlete	Event	Opposition Result	Opposition Result	Opposition Result	Opposition Result
Débora Hait	Featherweight (−57kg)	E Cartagena (PUR); L 2 – 5	Did not advance		
Verónica Tajes	Welterweight (−67kg)	K Dumar (COL); L 0 – 11	Did not advance		
Natalia Forcada	Heavyweight (+67kg)		N Martinez (PUR); L 1 – 8	Did not advance	

== Tennis ==
Argentina qualified a full team of six tennis players (three male and three female).

=== Men ===
Athlete	Event	Round of 32	Round of 16	Quarterfinals	Semi-finals	Final	
Athlete	Event	Opposition Score	Opposition Score	Opposition Score	Opposition Score	Opposition Score	Rank
Facundo Arguello	Singles	D Garza (MEX); L 2 – 6, 6 – 4, 5 – 7	Did not advance				
Eduardo Schwank	Singles	M Arévalo (ESA); L 4 – 6, 1 – 6	Did not advance				
Horacio Zeballos	Singles	I Miranda (PER); L 3 – 6, 4 – 6	Did not advance				
Eduardo Schwank; Horacio Zeballos	Doubles		J Benítez (PAR); DA Lopez (PAR); L 4 – 6, 6 – 2 [8–10]	Did not advance			

=== Women ===
Athlete	Event	Round of 32	Round of 16	Quarterfinals	Semi-finals	Final	
Athlete	Event	Opposition Score	Opposition Score	Opposition Score	Opposition Score	Opposition Score	Rank
Mailén Auroux	Singles	A Pérez (VEN); L 3–6, 7–5, 0–6	Did not advance				
María Irigoyen	Singles	V Cepede (PAR); L 2–6, 6–3, 2–6	Did not advance				
Florencia Molinero	Singles	M Díaz (CUB); W 6–1, 7(2)-6	I Robiani (PAR); W 6–3, 6–1	J Roland (PUR); W 6–4, 6–2	I Falconi (USA); L 3–6, 4–6	C McHale (USA); L 1–6, 1–6	4th
María Irigoyen; Florencia Molinero	Doubles			MF Álvarez (BOL); N Zeballos (BOL); W 7–5, 6–4	C Castaño (COL); M Duque (COL); W 3–6, 6–1, 12–10	I Falconi (USA); C McHale (USA); W 6–4, 2–6, 10–6	1st place, gold medalist(s)

=== Mixed doubles ===
Athlete	Event	Round of 16	Quarterfinals	Semi-finals	Final	
Athlete	Event	Opposition Score	Opposition Score	Opposition Score	Opposition Score	Rank
Facundo Argüello; Mailén Auroux	Doubles	G Dabrowski (CAN); C Klingemann (CAN); W 7 – 6, 6 – 3	R Recarte (VEN); A Pérez (VEN); L 6–4, 1–6 [8–10]	Did not advance		

== Triathlon ==
Argentina qualified three male and two female triathletes.

=== Men ===
Athlete	Event	Swim (1.5 km)	Trans 1	Bike (40 km)	Trans 2	Run (10 km)	Total	Rank
Luciano Farías	Individual	18:11; 2nd	0:27; 30th	57:27; 24th	0:15; 7th	41:20; 30th	1:57:42	26th
Luciano Taccone	Individual	19:29; 30th	0:24; 12th	56:45; 5th	0:15; 9th	35:17; 14th	1:52:12	15th
Gonzalo Tellechea	Individual	19:32; 33rd	0:23; 2nd	56:41; 2nd	0:15; 17th	37:44; 21st	1:54:37	21st

=== Women ===
Athlete	Event	Swim (1.5 km)	Trans 1	Bike (40 km)	Trans 2	Run (10 km)	Total	Rank
Ana Paula Aguirre	Individual	28:15; 25th	Did not finish					
Romina Biagioli	Individual	20:44; 12th	Overlapped					
Romina Palacio Balena	Individual	20:52; 20th	0:26; 9th	1:03:05; 7th	0:17; 9th	39:58; 11th	2:04:40	11th

== Volleyball ==
Argentina qualified a men's team to compete at the 2011 Pan American Games and will participate in Group A.

Men

Squad

- Nicolás Bruno
- Iván Castellani
- Maximiliano Cavanna
- Pablo Crer
- Maximiliano Gauna
- Mariano Giustiniano
- Franco López
- Hernán Pereyra
- Gonzalo Quiroga
- Sebastián Solé
- Alejandro Toro
- Nicolás Uriarte

Pos	Team	Pld	W	L	Pts	SPW	SPL	SPR	SW	SL	SR	Qualification
1	Cuba	3	3	0	13	257	224	1.147	9	2	4.500	Semifinals
2	Argentina	3	2	1	8	331	331	1.000	8	7	1.143	Quarterfinals
3	Mexico	3	1	2	6	271	278	0.975	5	7	0.714	Quarterfinals
4	Venezuela	3	0	3	3	266	292	0.911	3	9	0.333	

Date		Score		Set 1	Set 2	Set 3	Set 4	Set 5	Total	Report
Oct 24	Cuba	3–2	Argentina	25–22	18–25	24–26	25–18	15–13	107–104	Report
Oct 25	Argentina	3–2	Mexico	25–23	25–23	25–27	21–25	15–10	111–108	Report
Oct 26	Argentina	3–2	Venezuela	25–23	21–25	29–27	23–25	18–16	116–116	Report

Quarterfinals

Date		Score		Set 1	Set 2	Set 3	Set 4	Set 5	Total	Report
Oct 27	Argentina	3–2	United States	25–17	19–25	25–18	17–25	15–11	101–96	Report

Semi-finals

Date		Score		Set 1	Set 2	Set 3	Set 4	Set 5	Total	Report
Oct 28	Brazil	3–1	Argentina	26–28	27–25	25–22	25–15		103–90	Report

Bronze medal match

Date		Score		Set 1	Set 2	Set 3	Set 4	Set 5	Total	Report
Oct 29	Argentina	3–2	Mexico	25–18	22–25	20–25	25–22	15–13	107–104	Report

2011 Pan American Games Bronze medal

Argentina

== Water polo ==
Argentina qualified a men's and women's water polo team.

=== Men ===
Team

- Fernando Arregui
- Brian Carabantes
- Iván Carabantes
- Gonzalo Echenique
- Ignacio Echenique
- Ramiro Gil
- Emanuel López
- Andrea Maroni
- Hernán Mazzini
- Bruno Testa
- Frano Testa
- Ramiro Veich
- Germán Yañez

The men's team competed in Group B.

Team	GP	W	D	L	GF	GA	GD	Pts
United States	3	3	0	0	37	15	+22	6
Brazil	3	2	0	1	34	26	+8	4
Argentina	3	1	0	2	23	30	-7	2
Venezuela	3	0	0	3	20	43	-23	0

October 23, 2011; 15:45	Report	Argentina	8–10	Brazil	Scotiabank Aquatics Center, Guadalajara; Referees: Menendez (CUB), Stampalija (CRO)
October 23, 2011; 15:45	Report	Score by quarters: 2 – 3, 1 – 1, 3–3, 2–2			Scotiabank Aquatics Center, Guadalajara; Referees: Menendez (CUB), Stampalija (CRO)
October 23, 2011; 15:45	Report	Echenique 3	Goals	4 players 2	Scotiabank Aquatics Center, Guadalajara; Referees: Menendez (CUB), Stampalija (CRO)

October 24, 2011; 17:00	Report	Argentina	8–7	Venezuela	Scotiabank Aquatics Center, Guadalajara; Referees: Mejia (MEX), Burt (CAN)
October 24, 2011; 17:00	Report	Score by quarters: 2 – 1, 4 – 0, 1 – 2, 1 – 4			Scotiabank Aquatics Center, Guadalajara; Referees: Mejia (MEX), Burt (CAN)
October 24, 2011; 17:00	Report	Yañez 3	Goals	Fernandez 3	Scotiabank Aquatics Center, Guadalajara; Referees: Mejia (MEX), Burt (CAN)

October 25, 2011; 14:30	Report	United States	15–7	Argentina	Scotiabank Aquatics Center, Guadalajara; Referees: Del Valle (PUR), Madera (CUB)
October 25, 2011; 14:30	Report	Score by quarters: 3 – 2, 3 – 2, 4 – 2, 3 – 1			Scotiabank Aquatics Center, Guadalajara; Referees: Del Valle (PUR), Madera (CUB)
October 25, 2011; 14:30	Report	Powers 3	Goals	Echenique 2	Scotiabank Aquatics Center, Guadalajara; Referees: Del Valle (PUR), Madera (CUB)

Elimination stage

Crossover

October 27, 2011; 12:30	Report	Colombia	9–10	Argentina	Scotiabank Aquatics Center, Guadalajara
October 27, 2011; 12:30	Report	Score by quarters: 3–4, 4–3, 1–3, 1–1			Scotiabank Aquatics Center, Guadalajara

Fifth place match

October 29, 2011; 14:00	Report	Argentina	12–10	Mexico	Scotiabank Aquatics Center, Guadalajara
October 29, 2011; 14:00	Report	Score by quarters: 4–2, 1–1, 5–2, 2–5			Scotiabank Aquatics Center, Guadalajara
October 29, 2011; 14:00	Report	Enchenique 5	Goals	Pulido 6	Scotiabank Aquatics Center, Guadalajara

2011 Pan American Games 5th

Argentina

=== Women ===
Team

- Mariana Cialzeta
- Carla Comba
- Mariela De Virgilio
- Rocío De Virgilio
- Laura Font
- Julieta Kruger
- Lea Ledoux
- María López Coton
- Cora Masip
- Paula Melano
- Gisela Pérez
- Cintia Santantino
- Aldana Videberrigain

The women's team competed in Group B.

Team	GP	W	D	L	GF	GA	GD	Pts
United States	3	3	0	0	63	7	+56	6
Cuba	3	2	0	1	22	36	-12	4
Puerto Rico	3	1	0	2	28	43	-15	2
Argentina	3	0	0	3	11	38	-27	0

October 23, 2011; 8:30	Report	Argentina	0–20	United States	Scotiabank Aquatics Center, Guadalajara; Referees: Mejia (MEX), Dester (BRA)
October 23, 2011; 8:30	Report	Score by quarters: 0 – 4, 0 – 6, 0 – 3, 0 – 7			Scotiabank Aquatics Center, Guadalajara; Referees: Mejia (MEX), Dester (BRA)
October 23, 2011; 8:30	Report		Goals	Dries 4	Scotiabank Aquatics Center, Guadalajara; Referees: Mejia (MEX), Dester (BRA)

October 24, 2011; 8:30	Report	Argentina	5–6	Cuba	Scotiabank Aquatics Center, Guadalajara; Referees: Dykman (CAN), Callejas (MEX)
October 24, 2011; 8:30	Report	Score by quarters: 0 – 2, 2 – 1, 2 – 1, 1 – 2			Scotiabank Aquatics Center, Guadalajara; Referees: Dykman (CAN), Callejas (MEX)
October 24, 2011; 8:30	Report	Font 2	Goals	Bernal 2	Scotiabank Aquatics Center, Guadalajara; Referees: Dykman (CAN), Callejas (MEX)

October 25, 2011; 8:30	Report	Argentina	6–12	Puerto Rico	Scotiabank Aquatics Center, Guadalajara; Referees: Mejia (MEX) Dykman (CAN)
October 25, 2011; 8:30	Report	Score by quarters: 3 – 1, 0 – 3, 3 – 4, 0 – 4			Scotiabank Aquatics Center, Guadalajara; Referees: Mejia (MEX) Dykman (CAN)
October 25, 2011; 8:30	Report	Ledoux 2	Goals	Ralat, Ortiz 3	Scotiabank Aquatics Center, Guadalajara; Referees: Mejia (MEX) Dykman (CAN)

Elimination stage

Crossover

October 26, 2011; 14:00	Report	Argentina	9–11	Mexico	Scotiabank Aquatics Center, Guadalajara; Referees: Dester (BRA), Maretzki (USA)
October 26, 2011; 14:00	Report	Score by quarters: 3–3, 2 – 3, 2 – 5, 2 – 0			Scotiabank Aquatics Center, Guadalajara; Referees: Dester (BRA), Maretzki (USA)
October 26, 2011; 14:00	Report	Ledoux 3	Goals	Campos 3	Scotiabank Aquatics Center, Guadalajara; Referees: Dester (BRA), Maretzki (USA)

Seventh place match

October 28, 2011; 12:30	Report	Venezuela	6–8 (OT)	Argentina	Scotiabank Aquatics Center, Guadalajara; Referees: Maretzki (USA), Lopez (COL)
October 28, 2011; 12:30	Report	Score by quarters: 2–2, 1 – 2, 1 – 2, 2 – 0 OT: 0 – 2			Scotiabank Aquatics Center, Guadalajara; Referees: Maretzki (USA), Lopez (COL)
October 28, 2011; 12:30	Report	Carangelo 3	Goals	De Virgilio 3	Scotiabank Aquatics Center, Guadalajara; Referees: Maretzki (USA), Lopez (COL)

2011 Pan American Games 7th

Argentina

== Water skiing ==
Argentina qualified five male and female athletes to compete.

=== Men ===
Event	Athlete	Semi-final		Final	
Event	Athlete	Points	Rank	Points	Rank
Tricks	Javier Andrés Julio	10040	1st	10140	1st place, gold medalist(s)
Tricks	Martín Malarczuk	Did not start			
Tricks	Jorge Ignacio Renosto	8820	2nd	7440	7th
Slalom	Javier Andrés Julio	36.00	5th	30.50	7th
Slalom	Martín Malarczuk	25.50	14th	Did not advance	
Slalom	Jorge Ignacio Renosto	27.50	13th	Did not advance	
Jump	Javier Andrés Julio	57.10	5th	Did not start	
Jump	Martín Malarczuk	44.50	10th	Did not advance	
Jump	Jorge Ignacio Renosto	Did not start			
Overall	Javier Andrés Julio			2870.7	1st place, gold medalist(s)
Overall	Jorge Ignacio Renosto			2254.1	4th
Wakeboard	Alejo De Palma	66.23	4th	65.11	3rd place, bronze medalist(s)

=== Women ===
Athlete	Event	Semi-final		Final	
Athlete	Event	Points	Rank	Points	Rank
Tricks	Lorena Botana	5740	6th	5870	5th
Slalom	Lorena Botana	19.50	9th	Did not advance	

== Weightlifting ==
Argentina qualified two male and two female weightlifters.

Athlete	Event	Snatch			Clean & jerk			Total	Rank
Athlete	Event	Attempt 1	Attempt 2	Attempt 3	Attempt 1	Attempt 2	Attempt 3	Total	Rank
Hugo Iván Catalán	Men's 69 kg	~~125~~	125	130	156	~~162~~	---	286	7th
Pedro Stetsiuk	Men's 105 kg	150	158	~~166~~	~~180~~	180	~~187~~	338	7th
María Eugenia Cavero	Women's 48 kg	63	66	~~69~~	80	~~84~~	~~84~~	146	6th
Malvina Soledad Verón	Women's 53 kg	72	~~76~~	~~76~~	93	~~98~~	~~98~~	165	6th

== Wrestling ==
Argentina qualified a five athletes to compete in wrestling.

=== Men ===
Freestyle

Athlete	Event	Quarterfinals	Semi-finals	Final	Rank
Athlete	Event	Opposition Result	Opposition Result	Opposition Result	Rank
Fernando Iglesias	60 kg	N Garcia (COL); W 3 – 1	G Torres (MEX); L 0 – 5	L Portillo (ESA); W 3 – 0	DQ (Note: The argentinian Fernando Iglesias lost the bronze medal in wrestling category of 60 kg for giving positive in cases of doping, the medal was assigned to the salvadoran Luis Portillo (Source).)
Fernando Carranza	66 kg	E Fuentes (VEN); L 0 – 4	Did not advance		

Greco-Roman

Athlete	Event	Quarterfinals	Semi-finals	Final	Rank
Athlete	Event	Opposition Result	Opposition Result	Opposition Result	Rank
Yuri Maier	96 kg	K Jarvis (CAN); W 3 – 1	R Angulo (COL); L 0 – 3	R Lambert (HON); W 5 – 0	3rd place, bronze medalist(s)

=== Women ===
Freestyle

Athlete	Event	Round of 16	Quarterfinals	Semi-finals	Final	Rank
Athlete	Event	Opposition Result	Opposition Result	Opposition Result	Opposition Result	Rank
Patricia Bermúdez	48 kg	I Medrano (ESA); W 3 – 0	C Huynh (CAN); L 1 – 3		Bronze medal match: L Valverde (ECU); W 3 – 1	3rd place, bronze medalist(s)
Luz Vázquez	63 kg		J Bouchard (CAN); W 3 – 0	K Vidiaux (CUB); L 0 – 5	Bronze medal match: V Torres Batista (DOM); W 3 – 0	3rd place, bronze medalist(s)
