= Handball at the 2011 Pan American Games – Women's tournament =

Women's handball at the XVI Pan American Games

Tournament details
- Host country: Mexico
- Venue: 1 (in 1 host city)
- Dates: 15–23 October
- Teams: 8 (from 1 confederation)

Final positions
- Champions: Brazil (4th title)
- Runners-up: Argentina
- Third place: Dominican Republic
- Fourth place: Mexico

Tournament statistics
- Matches played: 20
- Goals scored: 1,049 (52.45 per match)
- Top scorers: (Brazil) Fernanda da Silva (35 goals)

The women's tournament of handball at the 2011 Pan American Games in Guadalajara, Mexico took place from 15 October to 23 October, when the Brazil defeated Argentina 33-15 for the gold medal. All games were held at the San Rafael Gymnasium. The defending champions are Brazil, who won the title on home court. The winner of the competition qualified for the 2012 Summer Olympics in London, Great Britain.

== Teams ==
=== Qualification ===
A National Olympic Committee may enter one women's team for the handball competition. Mexico, the host nation along with seven other countries qualified through regional competitions.

Event	Date	Location	Vacancies	Qualified
Host Nation	–	–	1	Mexico
2010 South American Games	20–24 March 2010	(Colombia) Medellín	3	Argentina; Brazil; Uruguay
2010 Central American and Caribbean Games	18–25 July 2010	(Puerto Rico) Mayagüez	2	Dominican Republic; Puerto Rico
Canada Versus United States series winner	21–23 December 2010	(United States) Lake Placid (Canada) La Prairie	1	United States
Last Chance Qualifying Tournament	–	(Chile) Santiago	1	Chile*
TOTAL			8	

Canada Versus United States series

December 21; 4:00	United States	18–23	Canada	Lake Placid Olympic Training Center, Lake Placid; Attendance: 250; Referees: Perez (PUR), Guzman (PUR)
December 21; 4:00	Borg 5			Lake Placid Olympic Training Center, Lake Placid; Attendance: 250; Referees: Perez (PUR), Guzman (PUR)

December 23; 5:30	Canada	21–26	United States	La Magdeleine School, La Prairie; Attendance: 400; Referees: Perez (PUR), Guzman (PUR)
December 23; 5:30	Larouche 6		Borg 10	La Magdeleine School, La Prairie; Attendance: 400; Referees: Perez (PUR), Guzman (PUR)

Last chance qualifying tournament

- Chile will play in the Pan American Games in Guadalajara because Canada, Costa Rica and El Salvador withdrew from participating in the playoff that gave the last ticket to the competition.

=== Squads ===
At the start of tournament, all eight participating countries had 15 players on their rosters. Final squads for the tournament were due on September 14, 2011, a month before the start of 2011 Pan American Games.

- Argentina
- Brazil
- Chile
- Dominican Republic
- Mexico
- Puerto Rico
- United States
- Uruguay

== Format ==
- Eight teams are split into 2 preliminary round groups of 4 teams each. The top 2 teams from each group qualify for the knockout stage.
- The third and fourth placed teams will play the fifth to eight bracket.
- In the semifinals, the matchups are as follows: A1 vs. B2 and B1 vs. A2
- The winning teams from the semifinals play for the gold medal. The losing teams compete for the bronze medal.

Ties are broken via the following the criteria, with the first option used first, all the way down to the last option:

1. Head to head results.
2. Goal difference in the matches between the teams concerned.
3. Greater number of plus goals in the matches between the teams concerned.

== Draw ==
The draw for the tournament was held at the offices of the Organising Committee (COPAG) for the Games in Guadalajara on July 21 at 16:00 local time.

The competing are drawn to each group by couples. The first team selected randomly in the draw goes to group A and the second to Group B. The pots are based on the performance of national teams in both previous games and their standings in their respective regional competitions.

Pot 1	Pot 2	Pot 3	Pot 4
Brazil; Argentina	Dominican Republic; Mexico	Puerto Rico; United States	Uruguay; Chile

== Preliminary round ==
All times are local (UTC-5).

=== Group A ===
Pos	Team	Pld	W	D	L	GF	GA	GD	Pts	Qualification
1	Argentina	3	3	0	0	87	60	+27	6	Semifinals
2	Mexico (H)	3	2	0	1	55	63	−8	4	Semifinals
3	Puerto Rico	3	1	0	2	76	84	−8	2	5th–8th place semifinals
4	Chile	3	0	0	3	63	74	−11	0	5th–8th place semifinals

Source: Guadalajara 2011
Rules for classification: 1) points; 2) head-to-head points; 3) head-to-head goal difference; 4) head-to-head goals scored; 5) goal difference; 6) goals scored; 7) draw.
(H) Hosts

15 October; 15:00	Argentina	35–26	Puerto Rico	San Rafael Gymnasium; Referees: De Souza, Paz (BRA)
15 October; 15:00	Decilio 7	(18–8)	Ceballos 7	San Rafael Gymnasium; Referees: De Souza, Paz (BRA)
15 October; 15:00	3× (yellow card) 5× (suspension)	Report	4× (yellow card) 10× (suspension)	San Rafael Gymnasium; Referees: De Souza, Paz (BRA)

15 October; 20:00	Mexico	18–17	Chile	San Rafael Gymnasium; Referees: Meneses, Pinto (BRA)
15 October; 20:00	Saavedra 7	(8–7)	Feuchtmann, Musalem 4	San Rafael Gymnasium; Referees: Meneses, Pinto (BRA)
15 October; 20:00	3× (yellow card) 6× (suspension)	Report	3× (yellow card) 6× (suspension)	San Rafael Gymnasium; Referees: Meneses, Pinto (BRA)

17 October; 15:00	Chile	20–28	Argentina	San Rafael Gymnasium; Referees: De Souza, Paz (BRA)
17 October; 15:00	Feuchtmann 7	(8–20)	Decilio, Ferrea 6	San Rafael Gymnasium; Referees: De Souza, Paz (BRA)
17 October; 15:00	3× (yellow card) 7× (suspension)	Report	3× (yellow card) 5× (suspension)	San Rafael Gymnasium; Referees: De Souza, Paz (BRA)

17 October; 18:00	Puerto Rico	22–23	Mexico	San Rafael Gymnasium; Referees: González, Prieto (URU)
17 October; 18:00	García 8	(15–13)	Rivera 4	San Rafael Gymnasium; Referees: González, Prieto (URU)
17 October; 18:00	5× (yellow card) 3× (suspension)	Report	2× (yellow card) 5× (suspension)	San Rafael Gymnasium; Referees: González, Prieto (URU)

19 October; 15:00	Puerto Rico	28–26	Chile	San Rafael Gymnasium; Referees: Pinto, Meneses (BRA)
19 October; 15:00	García, Hiraldo 7	(17–15)	Canessa, Feuchtmann 5	San Rafael Gymnasium; Referees: Pinto, Meneses (BRA)
19 October; 15:00	2× (yellow card) 2× (suspension)	Report	3× (yellow card) 7× (suspension) 1× (red card)	San Rafael Gymnasium; Referees: Pinto, Meneses (BRA)

19 October; 20:00	Argentina	24–14	Mexico	San Rafael Gymnasium; Referees: González, Prieto (URU)
19 October; 20:00	Decilio 7	(8–7)	Flores 4	San Rafael Gymnasium; Referees: González, Prieto (URU)
19 October; 20:00	3× (yellow card) 2× (suspension)	Report	3× (yellow card) 4× (suspension)	San Rafael Gymnasium; Referees: González, Prieto (URU)

=== Group B ===
Pos	Team	Pld	W	D	L	GF	GA	GD	Pts	Qualification
1	Brazil	3	3	0	0	125	43	+82	6	Semifinals
2	Dominican Republic	3	1	1	1	75	82	−7	3	Semifinals
3	Uruguay	3	1	1	1	75	91	−16	3	5th–8th place semifinals
4	United States	3	0	0	3	60	119	−59	0	5th–8th place semifinals

Source: Guadalajara 2011
Rules for classification: 1) points; 2) head-to-head points; 3) head-to-head goal difference; 4) head-to-head goals scored; 5) goal difference; 6) goals scored; 7) draw.

15 October; 13:00	Brazil	50–10	United States	San Rafael Gymnasium; Referees: Durán, Guzmán (MEX)
15 October; 13:00	Da Silva 10	(23–6)	Sayer 3	San Rafael Gymnasium; Referees: Durán, Guzmán (MEX)
15 October; 13:00	2× (yellow card) 2× (suspension)	Report	4× (yellow card) 5× (suspension)	San Rafael Gymnasium; Referees: Durán, Guzmán (MEX)

15 October; 18:00	Dominican Republic	24–24	Uruguay	San Rafael Gymnasium; Referees: Marina, Minroe (ARG)
15 October; 18:00	Andino, Granado 6	(10–14)	Fynn 7	San Rafael Gymnasium; Referees: Marina, Minroe (ARG)
15 October; 18:00	3× (yellow card) 6× (suspension)	Report	3× (yellow card) 4× (suspension)	San Rafael Gymnasium; Referees: Marina, Minroe (ARG)

17 October; 13:00	United States	26–33	Dominican Republic	San Rafael Gymnasium; Referees: Pellerin, Martin (CAN)
17 October; 13:00	Borg 10	(16–11)	Granado 10	San Rafael Gymnasium; Referees: Pellerin, Martin (CAN)
17 October; 13:00	3× (yellow card) 4× (suspension) 1× (red card)	Report	1× (yellow card) 6× (suspension) 1× (red card)	San Rafael Gymnasium; Referees: Pellerin, Martin (CAN)

17 October; 20:00	Uruguay	15–43	Brazil	San Rafael Gymnasium; Referees: Pérez, Guzmán (PUR)
17 October; 20:00	Castro, Fynn 3	(5–20)	Da Silva 6	San Rafael Gymnasium; Referees: Pérez, Guzmán (PUR)
17 October; 20:00	3× (yellow card) 4× (suspension) 1× (red card)	Report	4× (yellow card) 4× (suspension)	San Rafael Gymnasium; Referees: Pérez, Guzmán (PUR)

19 October; 13:00	Brazil	32–18	Dominican Republic	San Rafael Gymnasium; Referees: Pellerin, Martin (CAN)
19 October; 13:00	Da Silva 8	(19–11)	Granado 6	San Rafael Gymnasium; Referees: Pellerin, Martin (CAN)
19 October; 13:00	3× (yellow card) 3× (suspension)	Report	3× (yellow card) 3× (suspension)	San Rafael Gymnasium; Referees: Pellerin, Martin (CAN)

19 October; 18:00	United States	24–36	Uruguay	San Rafael Gymnasium; Referees: Pérez, Guzmán (PUR)
19 October; 18:00	three players 5	(12–17)	Castro 10	San Rafael Gymnasium; Referees: Pérez, Guzmán (PUR)
19 October; 18:00	3× (yellow card) 9× (suspension) 2× (red card)	Report	3× (yellow card) 7× (suspension)	San Rafael Gymnasium; Referees: Pérez, Guzmán (PUR)

== Knockout stage ==
=== Bracket ===
Semifinals
21 October
Brazil	43
Mexico	12
21 October
Argentina	19
Dominican Republic	18

Final
23 October
Brazil	33
Argentina	15
Third place
23 October
Mexico	31
Dominican Republic (OT)	33

5–8th place semifinals
21 October
Puerto Rico	29
United States	27
21 October
Uruguay	30
Chile	32

Fifth place
23 October
Puerto Rico	27
Chile	31
Seventh place
23 October
United States	23
Uruguay	30

=== 5th–8th place semifinals ===
21 October; 10:00	Puerto Rico	29–27	United States	San Rafael Gymnasium; Referees: González, Prieto (URU)
21 October; 10:00	Hiraldo 10	(17–15)	Darling 6	San Rafael Gymnasium; Referees: González, Prieto (URU)
21 October; 10:00	3× (yellow card) 1× (suspension)	Report	3× (yellow card) 5× (suspension) 1× (red card)	San Rafael Gymnasium; Referees: González, Prieto (URU)

21 October; 17:30	Uruguay	30–32	Chile	San Rafael Gymnasium; Referees: De Souza, Paz (BRA)
21 October; 17:30	Castro 10	(18–15)	Feuchtmann 8	San Rafael Gymnasium; Referees: De Souza, Paz (BRA)
21 October; 17:30	3× (yellow card) 5× (suspension)	Report	4× (yellow card) 6× (suspension)	San Rafael Gymnasium; Referees: De Souza, Paz (BRA)

=== Semifinals ===
21 October; 12:30	Brazil	43–12	Mexico	San Rafael Gymnasium; Referees: Pellerin, Martin (CAN)
21 October; 12:30	Da Silva, Piedade 6	(20–5)	Jaramillo 3	San Rafael Gymnasium; Referees: Pellerin, Martin (CAN)
21 October; 12:30	1× (yellow card) 3× (suspension)	Report	3× (yellow card) 3× (suspension)	San Rafael Gymnasium; Referees: Pellerin, Martin (CAN)

21 October; 20:00	Argentina	19–18	Dominican Republic	San Rafael Gymnasium; Referees: Raluy, Sabroso (ESP)
21 October; 20:00	Tagliavini 3	(11–11)	Granado 8	San Rafael Gymnasium; Referees: Raluy, Sabroso (ESP)
21 October; 20:00	4× (yellow card) 6× (suspension)	Report	2× (yellow card) 6× (suspension) 1× (red card)	San Rafael Gymnasium; Referees: Raluy, Sabroso (ESP)

=== Seventh place match ===
23 October; 10:00	United States	23–30	Uruguay	San Rafael Gymnasium; Referees: Martin, Pellerin (CAN)
23 October; 10:00	Borg 6	(11–12)	Palla 9	San Rafael Gymnasium; Referees: Martin, Pellerin (CAN)
23 October; 10:00		Report		San Rafael Gymnasium; Referees: Martin, Pellerin (CAN)

=== Fifth place match ===
23 October; 12:30	Puerto Rico	27–31	Chile	San Rafael Gymnasium; Referees: Duran, Guzman (MEX)
23 October; 12:30	García 7	(14–17)	Cajas, Musalem 6	San Rafael Gymnasium; Referees: Duran, Guzman (MEX)
23 October; 12:30		Report		San Rafael Gymnasium; Referees: Duran, Guzman (MEX)

=== Bronze medal match ===
23 October
17:30
Mexico
31–33 (ET)
Dominican Republic
San Rafael Gymnasium
Referees: Pinto, Meneses (BRA)
Flores 7
(14–15)
Peña 10

Report

FT: 28–28 ET: 3–5

=== Gold medal match ===
23 October; 20:00	Brazil	33–15	Argentina	San Rafael Gymnasium; Referees: Pérez, Guzmán (PUR)
23 October; 20:00	Do Nascimento 8	(15–5)	Decilio, Mendoza 4	San Rafael Gymnasium; Referees: Pérez, Guzmán (PUR)
23 October; 20:00	3× (yellow card) 7× (suspension) 2× (red card)	Report	5× (yellow card) 5× (suspension)	San Rafael Gymnasium; Referees: Pérez, Guzmán (PUR)

== Ranking and statistics ==
Rank	Team
1st place, gold medalist(s)	Brazil
2nd place, silver medalist(s)	Argentina
3rd place, bronze medalist(s)	Puerto Rico
4	Mexico
5	Chile
6	Puerto Rico
7	Uruguay
8	United States

Qualified for the 2012 Summer Olympics
Qualified for the Olympic Qualification Tournament

2011 Pan American Games winners

Brazil
Fourth title

=== Top scorers ===
Rank	Name	Goals	Shots	%
1	(Brazil) Fernanda da Silva	35	43	82
2	(Puerto Rico) Ciris García	33	46	72
2	(Uruguay) Jussara Castro	33	51	65
4	(Dominican Republic) Judith Granado	32	65	49
5	(Puerto Rico) Sheila Hiraldo	29	60	48

Source: Guadalajara 2011

=== Top goalkeepers ===
Rank	Name	%	Saves	Shots
1	(Brazil) Chana Masson	55	47	85
2	(Brazil) Bárbara Arenhart	43	24	56
3	(Argentina) Valentina Kogan	42	42	101
4	(Uruguay) Noelia Artigas	37	45	121
5	(Argentina) Silvina Schlesinger	36	29	81

Source: Guadalajara 2011

== Medalists ==
Event	Gold	Silver	Bronze
Women	Brazil; Eduarda Amorim; Barbara Arenhart; Moniky Bancilon; Francine Cararo; Deonise Cavaleiro; Fernanda Da Silva; Fabiana Diniz; Alexandra Do Nascimento; Mayara Moura; Daniela Piedade; Silvia Pinheiro; Jessica Quintino; Samira Rocha; Ana Paula Rodrigues; Chana Masson	Argentina; Maria Belotti; Valeria Bianchi; Maria Decilio; Bibiana Ferrea; Lucia Haro; Valentina Kogan; Antonela Mena; Luciana Mendoza; Manuela Pizzo; Maria Romero; Noelia Sala; Luciana Salvado; Silvina Schlesinger; Solange Tagliavini; Silvana Totolo	Dominican Republic; Mariela Andino; Mariela Cespedes; Mari Colón; Cari Dominguez; Mileidys García; Judith Granado; Crisleydy Hernandez; Carolina López; Yndiana Mateo; Nancy Peña; Johanna Pimentel; Jessica Sierra; Suleidi Suarez; Yacaira Tejada; Debora Torreira
