= Chana Masson =

Brazilian handball player (born 1978)

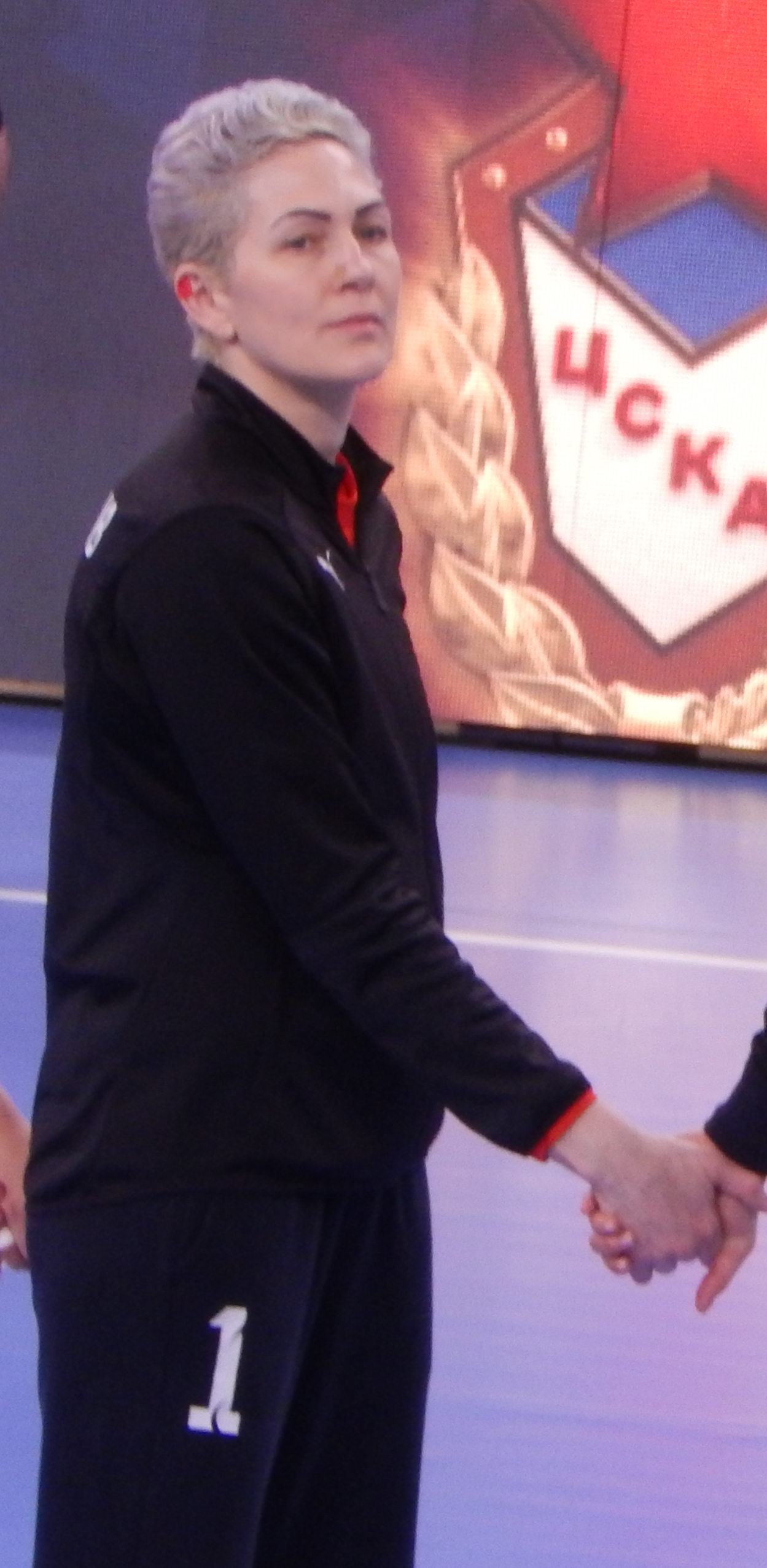

Personal information
- Full name: Chana Franciela Masson de Souza
- Born: 18 December 1978 (age 47) Capinzal, Brazil
- Height: 1.82 m (6 ft 0 in)

Sport
- Sport: Handball
- Position: Goalkeeper
- Current club: Handball Erice
- Number: 1

Senior clubs
- Years: Team
- –: Guarulhos
- –: Ulbia
- 1998–1999: CB Elche
- 1999–2004: Ferrobus Mislata
- 2004–2005: FCK Handbold
- 2006–2007: HC Leipzig
- 2007–2013: Randers HK
- 2013–2015: Viborg HK
- 2015–2017: Odense Håndbold
- 2018–2019: Storhamar HE
- 2019–2021: HBC CSKA Moscow
- 2021–2022: HH Elite
- 2022–2025: Handball Erice
National team
Years	Team	Apps	(Gls)
1999–2012	Brazil	182	(4)

Teams managed
- 2025–: Handball Erice (GK coach)
Medal record
Women's handball
Representing Brazil
Pan American Games
Gold medal – first place	1999 Winnipeg	Team
Gold medal – first place	2003 Santo Domingo	Team
Gold medal – first place	2007 Rio de Janeiro	Team
Gold medal – first place	2011 Guadalajara	Team
Pan American Championship
Gold medal – first place	2011 Brazil	Team

Chana Franciela Masson de Souza (born 18 December 1978 in Capinzal) is a Brazilian former handball goalkeeper. She has represented the Brazilian national team in four Olympics. She retired in 2025 after three years at Handball Erice, and afterwards she became the goalkeeping coach at the club.¨

== Career ==
Masson started playing hadball aged 11. She played for Ulbia and Guarulhos in Brazil, before joining Spanish side CB Elche in 1998. After a year she joined league rivals Ferrobus Mislata, where she won the 2000 EHF Cup, and the 2001, 2003 and 2004 Copa de la Reina.

In 2004 she joined Danish side FCK Håndbold. When FCK signed Hungarian goalkeeper Katalin Pálinger for the 2005-06 season, she joined German club HC Leipzig in search of more playing time. Here she won the 2006 Bundesliga and 2006 and 2007 DHB-Pokal. In 2007 she returned to Denmark, where she joined Danish side Randers HK. Here she won the 2010 EHF Cup, and the 2011-12 Danish Championship.

In 2013 she joined league rivals Viborg HK. In 2014 she won the Danish Championship again, as well as the Danish Cup and EHF Cup Winners' Cup. A year later she joined HC Odense, where she played until 2017, where she retired.

In 2018 she made a comeback to the court, after being contacted by Norwegian player Heidi Løke, who convinced her to join Norwegian club Storhamar HE. In 2018 she reached the final of the Norwegian Cup, where Storhamar lost to Vipers Kristiansand.

In 2019 she joined Russian club HBC CSKA Moscow. Here she won the 2021 Russian Championship. Afterwards she returned to Denmark again, where she joined Horsens HK. In August 2022 she was releasesd of her contract and subsiquently retired for personal reasons. In October 2022 she joined Italian Handball Erice. In 2023 she won the Italian Cup with the club. In 2025 she retired for a third time and became a coach at the club.

=== National team ===
Masson participated at the 2000 Summer Olympics in Sydney, at the 2004 Summer Olympics in Athens, the 2008 Summer Olympics in Beijing and the 2012 Summer Olympics in London.

Just before the 2013 World Championship she retired from the national team.

== Awards and recognition ==
- All-Star Goalkeeper of the World Championship: 2011

== Titles ==
- EHF Cup
  - Winner: 2000, 2010
- EHF Cup Winners' Cup:
  - Winner: 2014
- Copa de la Reina:
  - Winner: 2001, 2003, 2004
- German Bundesliga:
  - Winner: 2006
- DHB-Pokal:
  - Winner: 2006, 2007
- Danish Championship:
  - Winner: 2012, 2014
- Danish Cup:
  - Winner: 2014
- Norwegian Cup:
  - Finalist: 2018
- Russian Championship:
  - Winner: 2021
- Italian Cup:
  - Winner: 2023
