= Tarbut =

Jewish educational movement

The word Tarbut (תרבות) means "Culture" in Hebrew. The Tarbut movement was a network of secular, Hebrew-language schools in parts of the former Jewish Pale of Settlement, specifically in Poland, Romania and Lithuania. It operated primarily between the world wars. Some schools affiliated with the movement continue to operate today and new ones were established in the United States and other destinations of emigrants from central and eastern Europe.

== History ==
=== Education activities ===
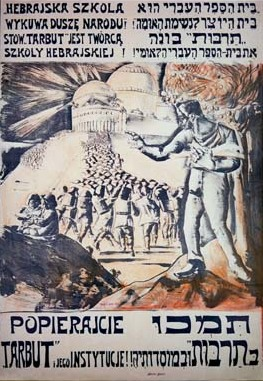
Poster from a Polish Tarbut school in the 1930s.

Tarbut was a network of Hebrew-language educational institutions established in newly independent Poland during the period between the world wars. The first Polish national Tarbut conference was held in Warsaw, in December 1921. Eventually the Tarbut network, which was supported by Zionist groups, encompassed kindergartens, elementary schools, secondary schools, teachers' seminaries, adult education courses, lending libraries and a publishing house that produced pedagogical materials, textbooks and children's periodicals.

Tarbut schools had 25,829 students in 1921; 37,000 in 1934–1935; and 45,000 students enrolled in some 270 institutions by 1939. These included about 25% of all students enrolled in Jewish schools in Poland, and 9% of Poland's entire Jewish student population. The curriculum was secular, including science, humanities, and Hebrew studies, including Jewish history.

By the time the war brought the European Tarbut schools to an end, they had long been suffering from chronic underfunding. European Jews who appealed to the American Jewish Joint Distribution Committee for aid included poet Chaim Nachman Bialik and Zionist leaders Nahum Sokolow and Vladimir Jabotinsky.

Nonetheless, some Tarbut schools continued to operate during the war years, notably one in Bukhara, Uzbekistan, which served the large population of Jewish refugees from Nazi-occupied Poland. The school operated until the end of the war under the headmastership of Nachum Szochet (נחום שוחט). The graduating students took high school matriculation exams under the auspices of the Polish government-in-exile, and as a result were able to continue their higher education after the war.

=== Publishing activities ===
Tarbut responded to the shift in Hebrew literature publishing to Palestine taking place around the time of its founding by fostering increased local Hebrew-language children's publishing. These efforts included Shibolim ("Ears of Wheat"), a Warsaw biweekly published during 1922-1923 which featured both vowelled and unvowelled text, making it suitable for children of all ages, and consisted largely of literature, entertainment, sports and crafts; and, from 1935 to 1939, the biweekly Olami, a current-events-heavy series which consisted of Olami ("My World"), for Grades 5–7; Olami Hakatan ("My Small World"), for Grades 3–4; and Olami Haktantan ("My Tiny World"), for Grades 1–2. Olami's material included current events in Palestine alongside information about Jewish life in Poland.

== Today ==
The Tarbut network no longer exists today, and so no school can today affiliate with it. Despite this, Jewish schools which share the values of the original Tarbut network have adopted the word as a part of their names:

- Argentina: Colegio Tarbut in Olivos, Buenos Aires
- Mexico: Colegio Hebreo Tarbut in Mexico City
- United States: Tarbut V'Torah Community Day School in Irvine, California
- Spain: Tarbut Sefarad, the first Jewish culture network in Spain
