= Valentina Kogan =

Argentine handball player

Personal information
- Born: 19 March 1980 (age 46) Buenos Aires, Argentina
- Height: 1.73 m (5 ft 8 in)

Sport
- Sport: Handball
- Position: Goalkeeper
- Current club: Vilo
National team
Years	Team	Apps	(Gls)
–	Argentina	170	(3)
Medal record
Representing Argentina
Pan American Games
Silver medal – second place	2003 Santo Domingo	Team
Silver medal – second place	2011 Guadalajara	Team
Silver medal – second place	2015 Toronto	Team
Bronze medal – third place	2007 Rio de Janeiro	Team
Pan American Championship
Gold medal – first place	2009 Santiago
Silver medal – second place	2007 Santo Domingo
Bronze medal – third place	2015 Havana
South American Games
Gold medal – first place	2010 Medellín	Team

Valentina Kogan (born 19 March 1980) is an Argentine handball goalkeeper. She plays for Vilo and the Argentina national team and participated at the 2011 World Women's Handball Championship in Brazil.

== Biography ==
Valentina Kogan is diabetic since the age of 10, and vegetarian since the age of 15. She started playing handball when she was in middle school at Colegio Tarbut, a Jewish private school with a trilingual education program. Kogan studied International Relations at the University of San Andrés, and is married since 2013 to Carolina Rieger. As of 2016, the couple is expecting twins, conceived by artificial insemination.

== Career ==
Kogan played professionally in Spain between 2002 and 2005 for the Spanish team Vícar Goya Koppert. She is also the director of Club de Corredores, a company dedicated to the organization of marathons and outdoor races.

As the goalkeeper for the National squad, she won silver medals at three Pan American Games (Santo Domingo 2003, Guadalajara 2011 and Toronto 2015) and the bronze medal at the Pan American Women's Handball Championship (Santo Domingo 2007), plus a bronze medal at the 2007 Pan American Games. In 2009, the team won the gold medal of the Pan American Championship after defeating Brazil. She also won the gold medal at the 2010 South American Games held in Medellín, Colombia.

Kogan retired from the Argentina National team after the 2016 Summer Olympics, finishing an 18-years long presence at the international level and inaugural participation of Argentina in Women's Handball at the Olympic Games.

=== Individual Achievements ===
- Top Goalkeeper:
  - 2015 Pan American Games
