= Magdalena Decilio =

Argentine handball player

Personal information
- Nationality: Argentinian
- Born: 23 March 1983 (age 43)
- Height: 1.73 m (5 ft 8 in)

Sport
- Sport: Handball
- Position: Pivot
- Current club: Estudiantes
National team
Years	Team	Apps	(Gls)
–	Argentina	89	(110)
Medal record
Pan American Games
Silver medal – second place	2003 Santo Domingo	Team
Silver medal – second place	2011 Guadalajara	Team
Bronze medal – third place	2007 Rio de Janeiro	Team

Magdalena Decilio (born 23 March 1983) is a team handball player from Argentina. She defends Argentina, such as at the 2011 World Women's Handball Championship in Brazil and the 2013 World Women's Handball Championship in Serbia.
