= Francine Moraes =

Brazilian handball player (born 1981)

Personal information
- Full name: Francine Camila de Moraes Cararo
- Born: 1 January 1981 (age 45) Sorocaba, Brazil
- Height: 1.72 m (5 ft 8 in)

Sport
- Sport: Handball
- Position: Right Back
- Current club: Hypo Niederösterreich
- Number: 20
National team
Years	Team	Apps	(Gls)
–	Brazil	99	(108)
Medal record
Representing Brazil
Pan American Games
Gold medal – first place	2011 Guadalajara	Team
- Updated on 3 November 2011

Francine Moraes (born 1 January 1981, in Sorocaba) is a Brazilian handballer who plays for Hypo Niederösterreich as a right back. She also plays in the Brazilian national team, and participated at the 2011 World Women's Handball Championship in Brazil and the 2012 Summer Olympics.
