= Colegio Tarbut =

Jewish private school in Argentina

- Hebrew: בית ספר תרבות

Information
- School type: Private Jewish day school
- Established: 1961; 65 years ago
- Gender: Mixed
- Website: www.tarbut.edu.ar/cms/

Colegio Tarbut (Hebrew: בית ספר תרבות) is a Jewish mixed-sex private school founded in 1961 in the city of Olivos, Buenos Aires Province, Argentina. It offers early childhood, primary, and secondary education.

The institution comprises a school in Olivos and two kindergartens in Belgrano and Tigre. Colegio Tarbut finished building a new secondary school in the Buenos Aires neighbourhood of Núñez, which opened in 2016.

== Pedagogy ==
Colegio Tarbut is named after the Tarbut movement of humanistic Jewish education and has much in common with that movement's curricular philosophy. The school offers a trilingual education in which Hebrew, English, and Spanish are taught.

The focus on academics has ensured that the majority of the graduated students pursue university studies. The school offers their pupils the opportunity to obtain the IB Diploma Programme (IBDP) of the International Baccalaureate foundation, the PET (Preliminary English Test) examination and the IGCSE examination, both from Cambridge University.

In tenth grade, in secondary school, you can choose an orientation in order to give an IGCSE examination on that subject. The orientations include Visual Arts, Business Studies, Social Studies and since 2015, Science.

== Traditions ==
=== Yom Sport ===
During the last months of the school year, usually October or November, an annual Yom Sport (Hebrew for "Sports Day") is held in which students compete in individual (sprinting, shot put, and long and high jump) and group sports (association football and handball). Students are divided into four teams, namely red, green, yellow and blue, and stay in the same team every year. Competitions in the group disciplines are done according to the teams. Athletics records are kept between years.

Some weeks after the Yom Sport another event is held in which winners in the individual events are announced and team rankings are published. Team rankings are computed according to the performance of the team members in the individual and group disciplines.

=== Religious services ===
During the Jewish High Holy Days the school holds religious services usually attended by current students, their families, and former alumni.
