= Pilar Romero =

Argentine handball player

Personal information
- Nationality: Argentine
- Born: 22 May 1982 (age 44)
- Height: 167 cm (66 in)

Sport
- Sport: Handball

Senior clubs
- Years: Team
- –: Estudiantes
National team
- Years: Team
- –: Argentina
Medal record
Pan American Games
Silver medal – second place	2011 Guadalajara	Team

Maria Pilar Romero (born 22 May 1982) is a team handball player from Argentina. She played for the Argentine national team, and represented them at the 2009 World Women's Handball Championship in China and at the 2011 World Women's Handball Championship in Brazil.
