= Amelia Belotti =

Argentine handball player

Personal information
- Full name: María Amelia Belotti
- Born: 17 November 1988 (age 37) Lomas de Zamora, Argentina
- Height: 1.79 m (5 ft 10 in)

Sport
- Sport: Handball
- Position: Left wing
- Current club: Boca juniors
National team
Years	Team	Apps	(Gls)
–	Argentina	83	(256)
Medal record
Pan American Games
Silver medal – second place	2011 Guadalajara	Team
Silver medal – second place	2015 Toronto	Team
Pan American Championship
Bronze medal – third place	2015 Cuba

María Amelia Belotti (born 17 November 1988) is an Argentine handball player. She plays for Vilo and the Argentina women's national handball team. She defended Argentina at the 2013 World Women's Handball Championship in Serbia.
