= Alejandra García =

Alejandra García may refer to:

- Alejandra García (pole vaulter)
- Alejandra García (actress)
