= Moniky Bancilon =

Brazilian handball player (born 1990)

Medal record

Representing Brazil

Women's Handball

Pan American Games
Gold medal – first place	2011 Guadalajara	Team

Moniky Bancilon (born 1990) is a Brazilian team handball player. She plays on the Brazilian national team and RK Podravka Koprivnica, and participated at the 2011 World Women's Handball Championship in Brazil.
