= Mariela Céspedes =

Dominican team handball player

Mariela Cespedes
Personal information
- Nationality: Dominican
- Born: 13 November 1993 (age 32)
- Height: 1.68 m (5 ft 6 in)

Sport
- Sport: Handball
- Position: Left back
- Current club: Maquiteria Handball
National team
Years	Team	(Gls)
–	Dominican Republic	(85)
Medal record
Pan American Games
Bronze medal – third place	2011 Guadalajara	Team
Pan American Championship
Bronze medal – third place	2013 Dominican Republic
Nor.Ca. Championship
Bronze medal – third place	2017 Puerto Rico

Mariela Cespedes (born 13 November 1993) is a Dominican team handball player. She plays for the club Maquiteria, and on the Dominican Republic national team. She competed at the 2013 World Women's Handball Championship in Serbia, where the Dominican Republic placed 23rd.
