= Silvia Pinheiro =

Brazilian handball player (born 1981)

Medal record

Representing Brazil

Women's Handball

Pan American Games
Gold medal – first place	2003 Santo Domingo	Team
Gold medal – first place	2011 Guadalajara	Team

Pan American Championship
Gold medal – first place	2011 Brazil	Team

Silvia Helena Araujo Pinheiro (born 1 November 1981) is a Brazilian former handballer who played the Brazilian national team as a left back.

At club level she played for the Austrian club Hypo Niederösterreich
