= Solange Tagliavini =

Argentine handball player

Personal information
- Nationality: Argentinian
- Born: 22 January 1985 (age 41)

Sport
- Sport: Handball
National team
- Years: Team
- –: Argentina
Medal record
Pan American Games
Silver medal – second place	2011 Guadalajara	Team
Bronze medal – third place	2007 Rio de Janeiro

Solange Tagliavini (born 22 January 1985) is a team handball player from Argentina. She defends Argentina, such as at the 2011 World Women's Handball Championship in Brazil.
