= Gimnasio San Rafael =

Arena in Guadalajara, Jalisco

- Location: Guadalajara, Jalisco
- Capacity: 1,541

Construction
- Opened: September 22, 2011
- Cost: 100 million pesos

Tenant
- 2011 Pan American Games

The San Rafael Gymnasium is an arena in Guadalajara, Jalisco. The arena was built to host the handball and karate competitions at the 2011 Pan American Games. It was built at a cost of 100 million pesos and officially opened on September 21, 2011, just 23 days before the start of the games. The complex has two handball courts, with the main gymnasium having a capacity of 1,541 spectators.
