= Luciana Salvadó =

Argentine handball player

Personal information
- Full name: Luciana Yael Salvadó
- Born: 3 April 1990 (age 36) Buenos Aires, Argentina
- Height: 1.69 m (5 ft 7 in)

Sport
- Sport: Handball
- Position: Left wing
- Current club: Club Ferro Carril Oeste
National team
Years	Team	Apps	(Gls)
–	Argentina	111	(339)
Medal record
Pan American Games
Silver medal – second place	2011 Guadalajara	Team
Silver medal – second place	2015 Toronto	Team
Pan American Championship
Silver medal – second place	2017 Argentina
Bronze medal – third place	2015 Cuba

Luciana Yael Salvado (born 13 April 1990) is an Argentine handball player for Club Ferro Carril Oeste and the Argentina women's national handball team.

She defended Argentina at the 2011 World Women's Handball Championship in Brazil.

== Achievements ==
- Argentinean Clubs Championship: 2015
