= Valeria Bianchi =

Argentine handball player

Personal information
- Nationality: Argentine
- Born: 16 September 1985 (age 41)
- Height: 1.70 m (5 ft 7 in)

Sport
- Sport: Handball
- Position: Left back
- Current club: NS Luján
National team
Years	Team	Apps	(Gls)
–	Argentina	154	(321)
Medal record
Pan American Games
Silver medal – second place	2011 Guadalajara	Team
Silver medal – second place	2015 Toronto	Team
Pan American Championship
Bronze medal – third place	2015 Cuba

Valeria Bianchi (born 16 September 1985) is an Argentine handball player. She plays for the Argentine national team, and has represented them at the 2011 World Women's Handball Championship in Brazil and the 2013 World Women's Handball Championship in Serbia.
