= Manuela Pizzo =

Argentine handball player (born 1991)

Personal information
- Born: 13 November 1991 (age 34) Buenos Aires, Argentina
- Height: 1.78 m (5 ft 10 in)

Sport
- Sport: Handball
- Position: Left back
- Current club: Mariano Acosta
- Number: 5

Senior clubs
- Years: Team
- 2011-2013: Estudiantes de La Plata
- 2013–2015: Blumenau
- 2015–2016: Estudiantes de La Plata
- 2016–2017: HB Plan-de-Cuques
- 2017–2019: Remudas Gran Canaria
- 2019–2021: BM Bera Bera
- 2021–2022: Skara HF
- 2022: Rocasa Gran Canaria
National team
Years	Team	Apps	(Gls)
2010-	Argentina	163	(391)
Medal record
Pan American Games
Silver medal – second place	2011 Guadalajara	Team
Silver medal – second place	2015 Toronto	Team
Silver medal – second place	2019 Lima	Team
Silver medal – second place	2023 Santiago	Team
Pan American Championship
Silver medal – second place	2017 Argentina
Bronze medal – third place	2015 Cuba
South and Central American Championship
Silver medal – second place	2018 Brazil
Silver medal – second place	2021 Paraguay
Silver medal – second place	2022 Argentina
South American Games
Silver medal – second place	2018 Cochabamba	Team

Manuela Pizzo (born 13 November 1991) is an Argentine handball player for BM Bera Bera and the Argentina women's national handball team.

She defended Argentina at the World Women's Handball Championships Brazil 2011 and Serbia 2013.

== Individual awards ==
- 2017 Pan American Women's Handball Championship: All Star Team left back
