= Pablo Sebastián Portela =

Argentine handball player

Personal information
- Born: 21 June 1980 (age 46) Buenos Aires, Argentina
- Height: 1.92 m (6 ft 4 in)

Sport
- Sport: Handball
- Position: Pivot
- Current club: Colegio Ward
National team
Years	Team	Apps	(Gls)
–	Argentina	132	(68)
Medal record
Pan American Games
Gold medal – first place	2011 Guadalajara	Team
Silver medal – second place	2015 Toronto	Team
Pan American Championship
Bronze medal – third place	2016 Argentina

Pablo Sebastian Portela (born 21 June 1980) is an Argentine handball player for UNLu and the Argentina men's national handball team.

He defended Argentina at the 2012 London Summer Olympics, and at the 2015 World Men's Handball Championship in Qatar.
