= Lucía Haro =

Argentine handball player

Lucia Haro
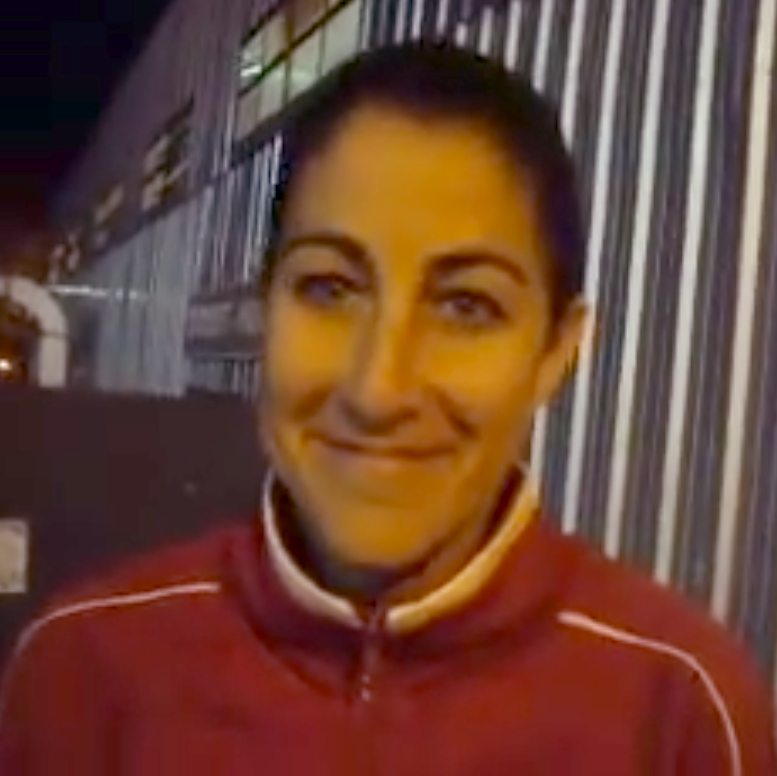
- In a 2013 interview

Personal information
- Nationality: Argentine
- Born: 21 August 1986 (age 40)
- Height: 1.78 m (5 ft 10 in)

Sport
- Sport: Handball
- Position: Right back
- Current club: Unión Eléctrica
National team
Years	Team	Apps	(Gls)
–	Argentina	98	(204)
Medal record
Pan American Games
Silver medal – second place	2011 Guadalajara	Team
Silver medal – second place	2015 Toronto	Team
Bronze medal – third place	2007 Rio de Janeiro	Team
Pan American Championship
Bronze medal – third place	2015 Cuba

Lucia Haro (born 21 August 1986) is an Argentine handball player. She plays for Unión Eléctrica and defended Argentina at the 2011 World Women's Handball Championship in Brazil.
