= Damián Migueles =

Argentine handball player

Personal information
- Nationality: Argentine
- Born: 24 November 1983 (age 42)

Sport
- Sport: Handball
National team
- Years: Team
- 2008–: Argentina
Medal record
Pan American Games
| Gold medal – first place | 2011 Guadalajara | Team |
| Silver medal – second place | 2007 Rio de Janeiro | Team |
| Silver medal – second place | 2015 Toronto | Team |

Damian Emmanuel Migueles (born 24 November 1983) is an Argentine handball player. He was born in Buenos Aires. He defended Argentina at the men's 2012 London Summer Olympics handball tournament.
