= Noelia Sala =

Argentine handball player

Personal information
- Nationality: Argentinian
- Born: 4 March 1988 (age 38) Haedo, Argentina
- Height: 1.71 m (5 ft 7 in)

Sport
- Sport: Handball
- Position: Central back
- Current club: Dorrego Handball
National team
Years	Team	Apps	(Gls)
–	Argentina	30	(23)

Noelia Sala (born 4 March 1988) is an Argentinian handball player. She defends club Dorrego and Argentina, and has played at the 2013 World Women's Handball Championship in Serbia. She is a member of the Fembal, Super 4 Women, League of Honor Ladies leagues.
