= Silvana Totolo =

Argentine handball player

Personal information
- Nationality: Argentinian
- Born: 14 October 1986 (age 40)
- Height: 164 cm (65 in)

Sport
- Sport: Handball

Senior clubs
- Years: Team
- –: Sedalo
National team
- Years: Team
- –: Argentina

Silvana Totolo (born 14 October 1986) is a team handball player from Argentina. She has played on the Argentine national team, and represented them at the 2009 World Women's Handball Championship in China and at the 2011 World Women's Handball Championship in Brazil.
