= Silvina Schlesinger =

Argentine handball player

Personal information
- Nationality: Argentine
- Born: 28 March 1985 (age 41)
- Height: 1.76 m (5 ft 9 in)

Sport
- Sport: Handball
- Position: Goalkeeper
- Current club: Quilmes
- Number: 12
National team
Years	Team	Apps	(Gls)
16	Argentina	134	(1)
Medal record
Pan American Games
Bronze medal – third place	2007 Rio de Janeiro
Pan American Championship
Bronze medal – third place	2015 Cuba

Silvina Schlesinger (born 28 March 1985) is an Argentine handball goalkeeper from. She defends Argentina, such as at the 2011 World Women's Handball Championship in Brazil.
