= Bibiana Ferrea =

Argentine handball player

Personal information
- Nationality: Argentine
- Born: 3 December 1980 (age 45)
- Height: 163 cm (64 in)

Sport
- Sport: Handball

Senior clubs
- Years: Team
- –: Sedalo
National team
- Years: Team
- –: Argentina

Bibiana Ferrea (born 3 December 1980) is a team handball player from Argentina. She represented the national team at the 2009 World Women's Handball Championship in China and again at the 2011 World Women's Handball Championship in Brazil.
