= Athletics at the 2011 Pan American Games – Women's 5000 metres =

Women's 5000 metres at the 2011 Pan American Games
- Venue: Telmex Athletics Stadium
- Dates: October 27
- Competitors: 12 from 7 nations

Medalists
Gold medal	Marisol Romero	Mexico
Silver medal	Cruz da Silva	Brazil
Bronze medal	Inés Melchor	Peru

The women's 5000 metres competition of the athletics events at the 2011 Pan American Games took place on the 27th October at the Telmex Athletics Stadium. The defending Pan American Games champion was Megan Metcalfe of Canada.

== Records ==
Prior to this competition, the existing world and Pan American Games records were as follows:

World record	Tirunesh Dibaba (ETH)	14:11.15	Oslo, Norway	June 6, 2008
Pan American Games record	Adriana Fernandez (MEX)	15:30.65	Santo Domingo, Dominican Republic	August 6, 2003

== Qualification ==
Each National Olympic Committee (NOC) was able to enter one athlete regardless if they had met the qualification standard. To enter two entrants both athletes had to have met the minimum standard (17:00.0) in the qualifying period (January 1, 2010 to September 14, 2011).

== Schedule ==
Date	Time	Round
October 27, 2011	17:20	Final

== Results ==
All times shown are in seconds.

KEY:	q	Fastest non-qualifiers	Q	Qualified	NR	National record	PB	Personal best	SB	Seasonal best	DQ	Disqualified

=== Final ===
Held on October 27.

Rank	Name	Nationality	Time	Notes
1st place, gold medalist(s)	Marisol Romero	Mexico	16:24.08	
2nd place, silver medalist(s)	Cruz da Silva	Brazil	16:29.75	
3rd place, bronze medalist(s)	Inés Melchor	Peru	16:41.50	
4	Sandra Lopez	Mexico	16:47.19	
5	Yudileyvis Castillo	Cuba	16:49.63	
6	Yolanda Caballero	Colombia	16:54.62	
7	Kim Conley	United States	17:00.90	
8	Neely Spence	United States	17:01.11	
9	Wilma Arizapana	Peru	17:06.99	
10	Nadia Rodriguez	Argentina	17:14.91	
11	Yudisleidis Fuente	Cuba	17:23.76	
12	Rosa Godoy	Argentina	17:33.77	
