= Swimming at the 2011 Pan American Games – Women's 4 × 200 metre freestyle relay =

Women's 4 × 200 metre freestyle relay at the 2011 Pan American Games
- Venue: Scotiabank Aquatics Center
- Dates: October 18 (preliminaries and finals)
- Winning score: 8:01.18

Medalists
Gold medal	Catherine Breed, Elizabeth Pelton, Chelsea Nauta, Amanda Kendall, Kim Vandenberg, Erika Erndl	United States
Silver medal	Joanna Maranhão, Jéssica Cavalheiro, Manuella Lyrio, Tatiana Barbosa, Sarah Correa, Gabriela Rocha, Larissa Cieslak, Thamy Ventorin	Brazil
Bronze medal	Liliana Ibáñez, Patricia Castañeda Miyamoto, Fernanda González, Susana Escobar, Martha Beltrán, Rita Medrano	Mexico

The women's 4 × 200 metre freestyle relay competition of the swimming events at the 2011 Pan American Games took place on the 18 of October at the Scotiabank Aquatics Center. The defending Pan American Games champion is the United States.

This race consisted of sixteen lengths of the pool. Each of the four swimmers completed four lengths of the pool. The first swimmer had to touch the wall before the second could leave the starting block.

== Records ==
Prior to this competition, the existing world and Pan American Games records were as follows:

World record	China (CHN); Yang Yu (1:55.47); Zhu Qianwei (1:55.79); Liu Jing (1:56.09); Pang Jiaying (1:54.73)	7:42.08	Rome, Italy	July 30, 2009
Pan American Games record	United States (USA); Jessica Rodriguez (1:59.97); Emily Kukors (1:59.57); Ava Ohlgren (2:00.19); Katie Carroll (2:02.30)	8:02.03	Rio de Janeiro, Brazil	July 18, 2007

== Results ==
All times shown are in minutes.

KEY:	q	Fastest non-qualifiers	Q	Qualified	GR	Games record	NR	National record	PB	Personal best	SB	Seasonal best	PR	Pan American Games record

=== Heats ===
The first round was held on October 18. As only seven teams had entered, the heats served as a ranking round with all teams advancing to the final.

Rank	Lane	Name	Nationality	Time	Notes
1	4	Kim Vandenberg (2:03.25); Elizabeth Pelton (2:00.39); Erika Erndl (2:01.68); Amanda Kendall (2:00.22)	United States	8:05.64	Q
2	6	Martha Beltran (2:09.32); Fernanda González (2:04.38); Rita Medrano (2:05.92); Liliana Ibáñez (2:10.35)	Mexico	8:29.97	Q
3	2	Yennifer Marquez (2:06.88); Elimar Barrios (2:08.03); Jeserik Pinto (2:08.31); Darneyis Orozco (2:07.36)	Venezuela	8:30.58	Q
4	5	Gabrielle Soucisse (2:07.81); Ashley McGregor (2:07.22); Karyn Jewell (2:09.80); Bridget Colley (2:08.26)	Canada	8:33.09	Q
5	3	Sarah Correa (2:13.24); Gabriela Rocha (2:12.33); Larissa Cieslak (2:13.46); Thamy Ventorin (2:07.92)	Brazil	8:46.95	Q
6	1	Mariangela Macchiavello (2:12.97); Patricia Quevedo (2:13.80); Maria Torres (2:11.97); Andrea Cedron (2:12.78)	Peru	8:51.52	Q
7	7	Nadia Colovini (2:09.15); Georgina Bardach (2:18.00); Julia Arino; Virginia Bardach	Argentina	9:09.18	Q

=== Final ===
The final was held on October 18.

Rank	Lane	Name	Nationality	Time	Notes
1st place, gold medalist(s)	4	Catherine Breed (2:00.99); Elizabeth Pelton (2:00.11); Chelsea Nauta (2:00.49); Amanda Kendall (1:59.59)	United States	8:01.18	GR
2nd place, silver medalist(s)	2	Joanna Maranhão (2:01.46); Jéssica Cavalheiro (2:03.30); Manuella Lyrio (2:01.22); Tatiana Lemos (2:03.91)	Brazil	8:09.89	
3rd place, bronze medalist(s)	5	Liliana Ibáñez (2:01.17); Patricia Castañeda (2:05.28); Fernanda González (2:02.70); Susana Escobar (2:03.04)	Mexico	8:12.19	
4	3	Yanel Pinto (2:03.75); Darneyis Orozco (2:08.45); Yennifer Marquez (2:05.33); Andreina Pinto (2:01.67)	Venezuela	8:19.20	
5	6	Caroline Lapierre (2:08.24); Paige Schultz (2:04.46); Sherry Liu (2:03.48); Jennifer Beckberger (2:03.75)	Canada	8:19.93	
6	1	Nadia Colovini (2:06.65); Virginia Bardach (2:05.58); Julia Arino (2:14.07); Georgina Bardach (2:12.66)	Argentina	8:38.96	
7	7	Andrea Cedron (2:07.31); Mariangela Macchiavello (2:11.99); Maria Alejandra Torres (2:10.78); Daniela Miyahara (2:12.16)	Peru	8:42.24	
