= Brazil at the 2011 Pan American Games =

- IOC code: BRA
- NOC: Brazilian Olympic Committee
- Website: www.cob.org.br

in Guadalajara 14–30 October 2011
- Competitors: 521 in 32 sports
- Flag bearer: Hugo Hoyama
- Medals Ranked 3rd: Gold 48 Silver 35 Bronze 58 Total 141

Pan American Games appearances (overview)
- 1951; 1955; 1959; 1963; 1967; 1971; 1975; 1979; 1983; 1987; 1991; 1995; 1999; 2003; 2007; 2011; 2015; 2019; 2023; 2027

Brazil competed at the 2011 Pan American Games in Guadalajara, Mexico from October 14 to 30, 2011. Bernard Rajzman served as chef de mission. Brazil's team consisted of 521 athletes in 32 sports.

== Medalists ==
Medal	Name	Sport	Event	Date
Gold	Thiago Pereira	Swimming	Men's 400 metre individual medley	October 15
Gold	Dayane Amaral; Debora Falda; Luisa Matsuo; Bianca Mendonça; Eliane Sampaio; Drielly Altoe	Gymnastics	Women's rhythmic group all-around	October 16
Gold	César Cielo	Swimming	Men's 100 metre freestyle	October 16
Gold	Felipe França Silva	Swimming	Men's 100 metre breaststroke	October 16
Gold	César Cielo; Bruno Fratus; Nicholas Santos; Nicolas Oliveira; Gabriel Mangabeira*; Thiago Pereira*; Henrique Rodrigues*	Swimming	Men's 4 × 100 metres freestyle relay	October 16
Gold	Dayane Amaral; Debora Falda; Luisa Matsuo; Bianca Mendonça; Eliane Sampaio; Drielly Altoe	Gymnastics	Women's rhythmic group 5 balls	October 17
Gold	Leonardo de Deus	Swimming	Men's 200 metre butterfly	October 17
Gold	Thiago Pereira	Swimming	Men's 100 metre backstroke	October 17
Gold	Hugo Hoyama; Gustavo Tsuboi; Thiago Monteiro	Table tennis	Men's team	October 17
Gold	Dayane Amaral; Debora Falda; Luisa Matsuo; Bianca Mendonça; Eliane Sampaio; Drielly Altoe	Gymnastics	Women's rhythmic group 3 ribbons + 2 hoops	October 18
Gold	Ana Luiza Mello	Shooting	Women's 25 metre pistol	October 19
Gold	Thiago Pereira	Swimming	Men's 200 metre individual medley	October 19
Gold	César Cielo	Swimming	Men's 50 metre freestyle	October 20
Gold	Brazil	Volleyball	Women	October 20
Gold	Larissa França; Juliana Felisberta	Beach volleyball	Women	October 21
Gold	Thiago Pereira	Swimming	Men's 200 metre backstroke	October 21
Gold	Guilherme Guido; Felipe França Silva; Gabriel Mangabeira; César Cielo; Thiago Pereira*; Felipe Lima*; Kaio Almeida*; Bruno Fratus*	Swimming	Men's 4 × 100 metres medley relay	October 21
Gold	Alison Cerutti; Emanuel Rego	Beach volleyball	Men	October 22
Gold	Adriana da Silva	Athletics	Women's marathon	October 23
Gold	Brazil	Handball	Women	October 23
Gold	Ricardo Santos	Sailing	Men's windsurf sailboard	October 23
Gold	Patricia Freitas	Sailing	Women's windsurf sailboard	October 23
Gold	Mauricio Oliveira; Alexandre de Silva; Guilherme Hamelmann; Daniel Santiago	Sailing	J/24 open class	October 23
Gold	Matheus Dellagnello	Sailing	Sunfish open class	October 23
Gold	Alexandre do Amaral; Gabriel Borges	Sailing	Snipe open class	October 23
Gold	Reinaldo Colucci	Triathlon	Men	October 23
Gold	Marcel Sturmer	Rollerskating	Men's free program	October 24
Gold	Francisco Barreto; Petrix Barbosa; Péricles da Silva; Diego Hypólito; Arthur Zanetti; Sergio Sasaki Jr.	Gymnastics	Men's artistic team all-around	October 25
Gold	Rosângela Santos	Athletics	Women's 100 metres	October 25
Gold	Leandro de Oliveira	Athletics	Men's 1,500 metres	October 26
Gold	Maurren Maggi	Athletics	Women's long jump	October 26
Gold	Lucimara da Silva	Athletics	Women's heptathlon	October 26
Gold	Luciano Corrêa	Judo	Men's 100 kg	October 26
Gold	Diego Hypólito	Gymnastics	Men's floor exercise	October 27
Gold	Ana Lemos da Silva	Athletics	Women's 200 metres	October 27
Gold	Marilson Santos	Athletics	Men's 10,000 metres	October 27
Gold	Leandro Guilheiro	Judo	Men's 81 kg	October 27
Gold	Tiago Camilo	Judo	Men's 90 kg	October 27
Gold	Fernando Reis	Weightlifting	Men's +105 kg	October 27
Gold	Diego Hypólito	Gymnastics	Men's vault	October 28
Gold	Ailson Feitosa; Sandro Viana; Nilson André; Bruno de Barros	Athletics	Men's 4 × 100 metres relay	October 28
Gold	Ana Cláudia Lemos Silva; Vanda Gomes; Franciela Krasucki; Rosângela Santos	Athletics	Women's 4 × 100 metres relay	October 28
Gold	Leandro Cunha	Judo	Men's 66 kg	October 28
Gold	Bruno Mendonça	Judo	Men's 73 kg	October 28
Gold	Lucélia Ribeiro	Karate	Women's 68 kg	October 28
Gold	Felipe Kitadai	Judo	Men's 60 kg	October 29
Gold	Brazil men's national volleyball team	Volleyball	Men	October 29
Gold	Solonei Silva	Athletics	Men's marathon	October 30
Silver	Yane Marques	Modern pentathlon	Women	October 15
Silver	Daynara de Paula	Swimming	Women's 100 metre butterfly	October 15
Silver	Joanna Maranhão	Swimming	Women's 400 metre individual medley	October 15
Silver	Michelle Lenhardt; Flávia Delaroli; Tatiana Barbosa; Daynara de Paula; Graciele Herrmann*	Swimming	Women's 4 × 100 metres freestyle relay	October 15
Silver	Felipe Lima	Swimming	Men's 100 metre breaststroke	October 16
Silver	Angélica Kvieczynski	Gymnastics	Women's rhythmic individual club	October 18
Silver	João Borges; Alexis Mestre	Rowing	Men's coxless pair	October 18
Silver	Joanna Maranhão; Jéssica Cavalheiro; Manuella Lyrio; Tatiana Barbosa; Sarah Correa*; Gabriela Rocha*; Larissa Cieslak*; Thamy Ventorini*	Swimming	Women's 4 × 200 metres freestyle relay	October 18
Silver	Rafael Andrade	Gymnastics	Men's trampoline	October 18
Silver	Fabiana Beltrame	Rowing	Women's lightweight single sculls	October 19
Silver	André Schultz; Nicolas Oliveira; Leonardo de Deus; Thiago Pereira; Giuliano Rocco*; Lucas Kanieski*; Diogo Yabe*	Swimming	Men's 4 × 200 metres freestyle relay	October 19
Silver	Bruno Fratus	Swimming	Men's 50 metre freestyle	October 20
Silver	Graciele Herrmann	Swimming	Women's 50 metre freestyle	October 21
Silver	Poliana Okimoto	Swimming	Women's marathon 10 km open water	October 22
Silver	Marcelo Giardi	Water skiing	Men's wakeboard	October 22
Silver	Rogério Dutra da Silva	Tennis	Men's singles	October 22
Silver	Aline Ferreira	Wrestling	Women's freestyle 72 kg	October 22
Silver	Bernardo Arndt; Bruno Oliveira	Sailing	Hobie 16 open class	October 23
Silver	Fabiana Murer	Athletics	Women's pole vault	October 24
Silver	Cruz Nonata da Silva	Athletics	Women's 10,000 metres	October 24
Silver	Team Brazil	Handball	Men	October 24
Silver	Rafael Silva	Judo	Men's +100 kg	October 26
Silver	Arthur Zanetti	Gymnastics	Men's rings	October 27
Silver	Cruz Nonata da Silva	Athletics	Women's 5,000 metres	October 27
Silver	Team Brazil	Equestrian	Team jumping	October 27
Silver	Brazil women's national football team	Football	Women	October 27
Silver	Kléberson Davide	Athletics	Men's 800 metres	October 28
Silver	Hudson de Souza	Athletics	Men's 3,000 metres steeplechase	October 28
Silver	Joelma Sousa; Geisa Coutinho; Bárbara de Oliveira; Jailma de Lima	Athletics	Women's 4 × 400 metres relay	October 28
Silver	Erlon Silva; Ronilson Oliveira	Canoeing	Men's C-2 1,000 metres	October 28
Silver	Rafaela Silva	Judo	Women's 57 kg	October 28
Silver	Robson Conceição	Boxing	Men's Lightweight 60 kg	October 29
Silver	Yamaguchi Florentino	Boxing	Men's Light heavyweight 81 kg	October 29
Silver	Nivalter Jesus	Canoeing	Men's C-1 200 metres	October 29
Silver	Erika Miranda	Judo	Women's 52 kg	October 29
Bronze	Angélica Kvieczynski	Gymnastics	Women's rhythmic individual all-around	October 15
Bronze	Márcio Ferreira	Taekwondo	Men's 58 kg	October 15
Bronze	Júlio Almeida	Shooting	Men's 10 metre air pistol	October 16
Bronze	Angélica Kvieczynski	Gymnastics	Women's rhythmic individual hoop	October 17
Bronze	Angélica Kvieczynski	Gymnastics	Women's rhythmic individual ball	October 17
Bronze	Kaio Almeida	Swimming	Men's 200 metre butterfly	October 17
Bronze	Guilherme Guido	Swimming	Men's 100 metre backstroke	October 17
Bronze	Daniel Paiola	Badminton	Men's singles	October 18
Bronze	Júlio Almeida	Shooting	Men's 50 metre pistol	October 18
Bronze	Thiago Pereira	Swimming	Men's 200 metre breaststroke	October 18
Bronze	Joanna Maranhão	Swimming	Women's 200 metre individual medley	October 18
Bronze	Roberto Schmits	Shooting	Men's trap	October 19
Bronze	Henrique Rodrigues	Swimming	Men's 200 metre individual medley	October 19
Bronze	Luiz da Graça	Shooting	Men's double trap	October 20
Bronze	Vinicius de Lima; Vinicius Rodrigues; Rafael Fernandes	Squash	Men's team	October 20
Bronze	Lara Teixeira; Nayara Figueira	Synchronized swimming	Women's duet	October 20
Bronze	Bruno Heck	Shooting	Men's 50 metre rifle three positions	October 21
Bronze	Fabíola Molina; Tatiane Sakemi; Daynara de Paula; Tatiana Barbosa	Swimming	Women's 4 × 100 metres medley relay	October 21
Bronze	Giovana Stephan; Joseane Costa; Lara Teixeira; Lorena Molinos; Maria Bruno; Maria Pereira; Nayara Figueira; Pamela Nogueira	Synchronized swimming	Women's team	October 21
Bronze	Ana Clara Duarte; Rogério Dutra da Silva	Tennis	Mixed doubles	October 21
Bronze	Joice Silva	Wrestling	Women's freestyle 55 kg	October 22
Bronze	Jesper Martendal on Laid Jimmy; Marcelo Tosi on Eleda All Black; Marcio Jorge on Josephine MCJ; Ruy Fonseca Filho on Tom Bombadill Too; Serguei Fofanoff on Barabara TW	Equestrian	Team eventing	October 23
Bronze	Claudio Biekarck; Marcelo da Silva; Gunnar Ficker	Sailing	Lightning open class	October 23
Bronze	Pamella Nascimento	Triathlon	Women	October 23
Bronze	Joilson Silva	Athletics	Men's 5,000 metres	October 24
Bronze	Ronald Julião	Athletics	Men's discus throw	October 24
Bronze	Talitha Haas	Roller skating	Women's free program	October 24
Bronze	Brazil women's national basketball team	Basketball	Women	October 25
Bronze	Robenílson Vieira	Boxing	Men's Bantamweight 56 kg	October 25
Bronze	Éverton Lopes	Boxing	Men's Light welterweight 64 kg	October 25
Bronze	Guilherme Toldo	Fencing	Men's individual foil	October 25
Bronze	Geisa Coutinho	Athletics	Women's 400 metres	October 26
Bronze	Julião Neto	Boxing	Men's Flyweight 52 kg	October 26
Bronze	Myke Carvalho	Boxing	Men's Welterweight 69 kg	October 26
Bronze	Roseli Feitosa	Boxing	Women's light heavyweight 75 kg	October 26
Bronze	Maria Suelen Altheman	Judo	Women's +78 kg	October 26
Bronze	Bruno de Barros	Athletics	Men's 200 metres	October 27
Bronze	Jefferson Sabino	Athletics	Men's triple jump	October 27
Bronze	Giovani dos Santos	Athletics	Men's 10,000 metres	October 27
Bronze	Marcelo Suartz	Bowling	Men's singles	October 27
Bronze	Team Brazil	Canoeing	Men's K-4 1,000 metres	October 27
Bronze	César Castro	Diving	Men's 3 metre springboard	October 27
Bronze	Maria Portela	Judo	Women's 70 kg	October 27
Bronze	Mayra Aguiar	Judo	Women's 78 kg	October 27
Bronze	Wellington Barbosa	Karate	Men's +84 kg	October 27
Bronze	Daniele Hypólito	Gymnastics	Women's balance beam	October 28
Bronze	Daniele Hypólito	Gymnastics	Women's floor exercise	October 28
Bronze	Sabine Heitling	Athletics	Women's 3,000 metres steeplechase	October 28
Bronze	Fernando Scavasin; Heitor Shimbo; Guilherme Toldo; Renzo Agresta	Fencing	Men's team foil	October 28
Bronze	Jéssica Candido	Karate	Women's 50 kg	October 28
Bronze	Douglas Brose	Karate	Men's 60 kg	October 28
Bronze	Brazil women's national water polo team	Water polo	Women	October 28
Bronze	Givago Ribeiro; Gilvan Ribeiro	Canoeing	Men's K-2 200 metres	October 29
Bronze	Bernardo Alves on Bridgit	Equestrian	Individual jumping	October 29
Bronze	Renzo Agresta; William de Moraes; Tywilliam Pacheco; Heitor Shimbo	Fencing	Men's team sabre	October 29
Bronze	Sarah Menezes	Judo	Women's 48 kg	October 29
Bronze	Valéria Kumizaki	Karate	Women's 55 kg	October 29
Bronze	Brazil men's national water polo team	Water polo	Men	October 29

== Archery ==
Brazil has qualified a full men's and women's team of three athletes each.

=== Men ===
Athlete	Event	Ranking Round		Round of 32	Round of 16	Quarterfinals	Semifinals	Final
Athlete	Event	Score	Seed	Opposition Score	Opposition Score	Opposition Score	Opposition Score	Opposition Score
Daniel Xavier	Men's individual	1300	12	Kevin Vargas (ECU); W 6 – 0	David Vilchez (VEN); W 6 – 2	Juan Serrano (MEX); L 4 – 6	Did not advance	
Luiz Trainini	Men's individual	1291	13	Patrick Rivest-Bunster (CAN); W 7 – 3	Juan Serrano (MEX); L 2 – 6	Did not advance		
Fabio Emilio	Men's individual	1239	23	J Kaminshi (USA); L 0 – 6	Did not advance			
Daniel Xavier; Fabio Emilio; Luiz Trainini	Men's team	3830	5		BYE	Cuba; L 211 – 218	Did not advance	

=== Women ===
Athlete	Event	Ranking Round		Round of 32	Round of 16	Quarterfinals	Semifinals	Final
Athlete	Event	Score	Seed	Opposition Score	Opposition Score	Opposition Score	Opposition Score	Opposition Score
Sarah Nikitin	Women's individual	1234	19	Saraneth Rivera (VEN); W 7 – 3	Aída Román (MEX); L 2 – 6	Did not advance		
Fatima Rocha de Carvalho	Women's individual	1197	27	Marie-Pier Beaudet (CAN); L 0 – 6	Did not advance			
Michelle Acquesta	Women's individual	1194	28	Leidys Brito (VEN); L 1 – 7	Did not advance			
Sarah Nikitin; Fatima Rocha de Carvalho; Michelle Acquesta	Women's team	3625	10		Chile; L 186 – 193	Did not advance		

== Athletics ==
=== Track and road events ===
Event	Athletes	Heats		Semifinal		Final	
Event	Athletes	Time	Rank	Time	Rank	Time	Rank
100 m	Nilson André	10.33	1st Q	10.23	3rd Q	10.26	5th
100 m	Sandro Viana	10.38	4th q	10.49	6th	Did not advance	
200 m	Bruno de Barros	20.53	1st Q	20.35	1st Q	20.45	3rd place, bronze medalist(s)
200 m	Sandro Viana	20.65	1st Q	20.39 SB	2nd Q	20.94	7th
400 m	Anderson Henriques			45.71 PB	2nd Q	45.92	8th
800 m	Kléberson Davide			1:49.65	2nd Q	1:45.75	2nd place, silver medalist(s)
800 m	Lutimar Paes			1:48.37	3rd Q	1:47.76	6th
1500 m	Leandro Oliveira					3:53.44	1st place, gold medalist(s)
5000 m	Joilson Silva					14:16.11	3rd place, bronze medalist(s)
10,000 m	Marilson Santos					29:00.64	1st place, gold medalist(s)
10,000 m	Giovani Dos Santos					29:51.71	3rd place, bronze medalist(s)
110 m hurdles	Matheus Inocencio			13.67	3rd Q	13.76	8th
400 m hurdles	Mahau Suguimati			50.20	1st Q	49.61	5th
3000 m steeplechase	Hudson Souza					8:48.75	2nd place, silver medalist(s)
4 × 100 m relay	Sandro Viana; Ailson Feitosa; Nilson André; Bruno de Barros; Carlos Moraes Junior^{*} Matheus Inocencio^{*}			39.44	3rd Q	38.18 =PR	1st place, gold medalist(s)
Marathon	Solonei Silva					2:16:37	1st place, gold medalist(s)
Marathon	Jean da Silva					2:22:41	9th
20 km walk	Caio Bonfim					DSQ	
20 km walk	Moacir Zimmermann					DSQ	
50 km walk	Jonathan Riekmann					4:04:07 PB	5th
50 km walk	Mario Santos Junior					DSQ	

^{*}-Indicates athletes that participated in the preliminaries but not the finals

=== Field events ===
Event	Athletes	Semifinal		Final	
Event	Athletes	Result	Rank	Result	Rank
High jump	Rafael dos Santos			2.10 m.	13th
Pole vault	Fábio Silva			5.40 m.	5th
Long jump	Rogério Bispo	7.51 m.	6th	Did not advance	
Triple jump	Jefferson Sabino			16.51 m.	3rd place, bronze medalist(s)
Shot put	Ronald Julião			17.94 m.	9th
Discus throw	Ronald Julião			61.70 m.	3rd place, bronze medalist(s)
Hammer throw	Wagner Domingos			70.16 m.	4th
Javelin throw	Júlio César de Oliveira			76.24 m.	6th

=== Combined events ===
Decathlon	Event	Luiz Araújo		
Decathlon	Event	Results	Points	Rank
	100 m	10.82	901	5th
	Long jump	5.37 m.	455	14th
	Shot put	DNS		
	High jump	DNS		
	400 m	DNS		
	110 m hurdles	DNS		
	Discus throw	DNS		
	Pole vault	DNS		
	Javelin throw	DNS		
	1500 m	DNS		
Final			DNF	

=== Track and road events ===
Event	Athletes	Semifinal		Final	
Event	Athletes	Result	Rank	Result	Rank
100 m	Rosângela Santos	11.26 PB	1st Q	11.22 PB	1st place, gold medalist(s)
100 m	Ana Cláudia Lemos	11.46	2nd Q	11.35	4th
200 m	Ana Cláudia Lemos	22.72	1st Q	22.76	1st place, gold medalist(s)
200 m	Vanda Gomes	23.89	6th	Did not advance	
400 m	Geisa Coutinho	52.56	4th q	51.87	3rd place, bronze medalist(s)
400 m	Joelma Sousa	52.96	3rd Q	52.34	6th
800 m	Christiane Santos			2:06.15	5th
1500 m	Fabiana da Silva			4:28.33	4th
5000 m	Cruz da Silva			16:29.75	2nd place, silver medalist(s)
10000 m	Cruz da Silva			34:22.44	2nd place, silver medalist(s)
100 m hurdles	Maila Machado	13.36	4th q	13.14 SB	5th
400 m hurdles	Jailma Lima	58.29	4th Q	57.71	5th
3000 m steeplechase	Sabine Heitling			10:10.98	3rd place, bronze medalist(s)
4 × 100 m relay	Ana Cláudia Lemos; Vanda Gomes; Franciela Krasucki; Rosângela Santos			42.85 NR	1st place, gold medalist(s)
4 × 400 m relay	Joelma Sousa; Geisa Coutinho; Barbara Oliveira; Jailma Lima			3:29.59	2nd place, silver medalist(s)
Marathon	Adriana Da Silva			2:36:37 RP	1st place, gold medalist(s)
Marathon	Michele Chagas			DNF	
20 km walk	Cisiane Lopes			DNF	
20 km walk	Erica Sena			DSQ	

=== Field events ===
Event	Athletes	Final	
Event	Athletes	Result	Rank
High jump	Valdileia Martins	1.84 m.	5th
Pole vault	Fabiana Murer	4.70 m.	2nd place, silver medalist(s)
Pole vault	Karla Silva	4.30 m.	4th
Long jump	Maurren Maggi	6.94 SB	1st place, gold medalist(s)
Long jump	Keila Costa	6.37	5th
Triple jump	Keila Costa	14.01	4th
Shot put	Keely Medeiros	NM	
Discus throw	Fernanda Martins	54.56 m.	7th
Discus throw	Elisângela Adriano	54.08 m.	8th
Hammer throw	Josiane Soares	61.47 m.	9th
Javelin throw	Laila E Silva	46.43 m.	15th

=== Combined events ===
Heptathlon	Event	Lucimara Da Silva		
Heptathlon	Event	Results	Points	Rank
	100 m hurdles	13.50 PB	1050	1st
	High jump	1.80 m.	978	1st
	Shot put	12.93 m. PB	723	3rd
	200 m	24.76 PB	909	2nd
	Long jump	6.36 m.	962	1st
	Javelin throw	42.03 m. PB	706	3rd
	800 m	2:21.39	805	4th
Final			6133 PB	1st place, gold medalist(s)

== Badminton ==
Brazil has qualified four male and female athletes in the individual and team competitions.

=== Men ===
Athlete	Event	First round	Second round	Third round	Quarterfinals	Semifinals	Final	Rank
Athlete	Event	Opposition Result	Opposition Result	Opposition Result	Opposition Result	Opposition Result	Opposition Result	Rank
Daniel Paiola	Men's singles	BYE	L Camacho (VEN); W 2–0 (21–14, 21–9)	A Raposo (DOM); W 2–0 (21–7, 21–8)	L Muñoz (MEX); W 2–0 (21–12, 21–16)	K Cordón (GUA); L 0–2 (14–21, 8–21)	DNA	3rd place, bronze medalist(s)
Luíz dos Santos	Men's singles	BYE	S Wojcikiewicz (CAN); L 0–2 (13–21, 13–21)	Did not advance				
Alex Yuwan Tjong	Men's singles	BYE	L Uzcategui (VEN); W 2–0 (21–6, 21–8)	C Araya (CHI); W 2–0 (21–13, 21–14)	C Pyne (JAM); L 1–2 (14–21, 21–19, 19–21)	Did not advance		
Luíz dos Santos; Alex Yuwan Tjong	Men's doubles			A López (MEX); L Muñoz (MEX); L 0–2 (16–21, 16–21)	Did not advance			
Hugo Arthuso; Daniel Paiola	Men's doubles			V Soeroredjo (SUR); M Wongsodikromo (SUR); W 2–1 (21–18, 17–21, 21–11)	H Haryanto Ho (USA); S Pongnairat (USA); L 0–2 (17–21, 15–21)	Did not advance		

=== Women ===
Athlete	Event	First round	Second round	Third round	Quarterfinals	Semifinals	Final	Rank
Athlete	Event	Opposition Result	Opposition Result	Opposition Result	Opposition Result	Opposition Result	Opposition Result	Rank
Fabiana Silva	Women's singles	BYE	M Li (CAN); L 0–2 (10–21, 14–21)	Did not advance				
Lohaynny Vicente	Women's singles	B Vibieca (DOM); W 2–1 (21–14, 19–21, 26–24)	M Haldane (JAM); W 2–0 (21–17, 21–7)	A Monteverde (PER); W 2–0 (21–18, 21–18)	J Ko (CAN); L 0–2 (11–21, 12–21)	Did not advance		
Luana Vicente	Women's singles	BYE	L Tovar (VEN); W 2–0 (21–8, 21–8)	R Wang (USA); L 0–2 (18–21, 8–21)	Did not advance			
Marina Eliezer; Fabiana Silva	Women's doubles		L Duany (PER); A Monteverde (PER); L 0–2 (10–21, 10–21)	Did not advance				
Lohaynny Vicente; Luana Vicente	Women's doubles		BYE	E Lee (USA); P Obañana (USA); L 0–2 (7–21, 11–21)	Did not advance			

=== Mixed ===
Athlete	Event	First round	Second round	Quarterfinals	Semifinals	Final	Rank
Athlete	Event	Opposition Result	Opposition Result	Opposition Result	Opposition Result	Opposition Result	Rank
Daniel Paiola; Fabiana Silva	Mixed doubles	M Cuba (PER); L Duany (PER); L 0–2 (14–21, 19–21)	Did not advance				
Hugo Arthuso; Marina Eliezer	Mixed doubles	A López (MEX); V Montero (MEX); L 0–2 (12–21, 20–22)	Did not advance				

== Basketball ==
Brazil has qualified the men's and women's team to the basketball competition.

=== Men ===
- Lucas Alves
- Victor Benite
- Murilo Da Rosa
- Davi De Oliveira
- Jose Roberto Duarte
- Cristiano Felicio
- Guilherme Giovannoni
- Guilherme Hubner
- Bruno Irigoyen
- Marcelo Machado
- Wellington Santos
- Arthur Luiz Silva

Group B

Pos	Team	Pld	W	L	PF	PA	PD	Pts	Qualification
1	United States	3	2	1	231	206	+25	5 (Note: United States 77–76 Dominican Republic)	Advance to Semifinals
2	Dominican Republic	3	2	1	231	194	+37	5	Advance to Semifinals
3	Brazil	3	1	2	206	238	−32	4 (Note: Brazil 80–71 Uruguay)	
4	Uruguay	3	1	2	214	244	−30	4	

Notes:

October 26
13:00

Report

Brazil	80–71	Uruguay
Scoring by quarter: 19–18, 17–17, 20–16, 24–20
Pts: Giovannoni 15; Rebs: Giovannoni 8 Asts: Santos 3		Pts: Fitipaldo 16; Rebs: Vázquez, Borsellino 5 Asts: Osimani 5

CODE Dome, Guadalajara
Referees: Fernandez (ARG), Fernandez (CRC), Vazquez (PUR)

October 27
20:00

Report

United States	88–77	Brazil
Scoring by quarter: 19–18, 13–20, 24–23, 32–16
Pts: Ahearn 21; Rebs: Thomas 12; Asts: Dentmon 6		Pts: Santos 16; Rebs: Becker, Giovannoni 7 Asts: Santos 7

CODE Dome, Guadalajara
Referees: Fernandez (ARG), Dorame (MEX), Donnelly (CAN)

October 28
13:00

Report

Dominican Republic	85–77	Brazil
Scoring by quarter: 20–19, 13–21, 23–29, 29–8
Pts: Martinez 22; Rebs: Martinez 9 Asts: Soliver 3		Pts: Machado 17; Rebs: da Rosa, Giovannoni 5 Asts: Machado, Santos 5

CODE Dome, Guadalajara
Referees: Vazquez (PUR), Aluz (ARG), Kenyon (CAN)

Fifth place match

October 29
17:30

Report

Canada	56–74	Brazil
Scoring by quarter: 21–22, 15–14, 9–17, 11–21
Pts: Scrubb 10; Rebs: Sandes 12; Asts: Jones, Yu 2		Pts: Machado 19; Rebs: 3 players 6 Asts: Machado, Santos 3

CODE Dome, Guadalajara
Referees: Aracena (DOM), Fernandez (CUB), Dorame (MEX)

2011 Pan American Games 5th

Brazil

=== Women ===
- Tassia Carcavalli
- Damiris Dantas
- Izabela De Andrade
- Barbara de Queiroz
- Carina De Souza
- Érika de Souza
- Clarissa Dos Santos
- Gilmara Justino
- Palmira Marcal
- Iziane Marques
- Jacqueline Silvestre
- Silvia Valiente

Group B

Pos	Team	Pld	W	L	PF	PA	PD	Pts	Qualification
1	Brazil	3	3	0	280	140	+140	6	Advance to Semifinals
2	Colombia	3	2	1	195	169	+26	5	Advance to Semifinals
3	Canada	3	1	2	206	166	+40	4	
4	Jamaica	3	0	3	89	295	−206	3	

October 21
10:30

Report

Brazil	78–53	Canada
Scoring by quarter: 24–15, 19–10, 14–22, 21–6
Pts: Marques, 16; Rebs: 2 players, 10; Asts: 3 players, 3		Pts: Colley, 14; Rebs: Colley, 7 Asts: 4 players, 2

CODE Dome, Guadalajara

October 22
10:30

Report

Brazil	116–34	Jamaica
Scoring by quarter: 25–2, 27–9, 30–11, 34–12
Pts: De Souza, 22; Rebs: De Souza, 15; Asts: De Queiroz, 9		Pts: Jackson, 13; Rebs: Brown, 7 Asts: 2 players, 1

CODE Dome, Guadalajara

October 23
10:30

Report

Colombia	53–86	Brazil
Scoring by quarter: 13–17, 14–25, 18–22, 8–22
Pts: Leidy Sanchez, 13; Rebs: 2 players, 7 Asts: 2 players, 2		Pts: Marques, 25; Rebs: De Souza, 13; Asts: 2 players, 4

CODE Dome, Guadalajara

Semifinals

October 24
13:00

Report

Brazil	68–69	Puerto Rico
Scoring by quarter: 17–13, 23–22, 12–21, 16–13
Pts: Valente, 16; Rebs: Souza, 15; Asts: Marçal, 4		Pts: Sepulveda, 22; Rebs: Placido, 7 Asts: Cortijo, 4

CODE Dome, Guadalajara

Bronze medal match

October 25
17:30

Report

Brazil	87–48	Colombia
Scoring by quarter: 24 – 11, 17 – 19, 28 – 11, 18 – 7
Pts: Marques, 20; Rebs: De Souza, 9 Asts: 4 players, 2		Pts: Sanchez, 12; Rebs: Palacio, 7 Asts: Mosquera, 4

CODE Dome, Guadalajara

2011 Pan American Games Bronze medal

Brazil

== Beach volleyball ==
Brazil has qualified a men's pair and women's pair in the beach volleyball competition.

Athlete	Event	Preliminary round			Quarterfinals	Semifinals	Finals
Athlete	Event	Opposition Score	Opposition Score	Opposition Score	Opposition Score	Opposition Score	Opposition Score
Alison Cerutti; Emanuel Rego	Men	Esteban Escobar (CRC); Bryan Monge (CRC); W 21-11, 21-7	Sergio Reynaldo Gonzalez (CUB); Karell Piña (CUB); L 19-21, 11-21	Yewddys Bolivar Perez (DOM); German Ricardo Recio (DOM); W 21-13, 21-12	Guillermo Federico Williman (URU); Nicolás Zanotta (URU); W 21-16, 21-13	Aldo Albino Miramontes (MEX); Juan Ramon Virgen (MEX); W 21-19, 20-22, 15-6	Igor Hernández (VEN); Farid Mussa (VEN); W 21-17, 21-12 (gold)
Larissa França; Juliana Silva	Women	Ayana Dyette (TRI); Elki Phillip (TRI); W 21-5, 21-16	Ketty Katherine Chila (ECU); Ariana Stefania Vilela (ECU); W 21-12, 21-11	Niriam Sinal (CUB); Onayamis Sinal (CUB); W 21-16, 21-13	Heather Ann Liebeck Bansley (CAN); Elizabeth S Maloney (CAN); W 21-15, 21-16	Yarleen Santiago (PUR); Yamileska Yantin (PUR); W 21-16, 21-12	Bibiana Candelas (MEX); Mayra Aide Garcia (MEX); W 21-15, 22-24, 22-20 (gold)

== Bowling ==
Brazil has qualified two male and two female bowlers to compete in the singles and pairs competitions.

=== Men ===
Individual

Athlete	Event	Qualification															Eighth Finals	Quarterfinals	Semifinals	Finals	
Athlete	Event	Block 1 (games 1–6)						Block 2 (games 7–12)						Total	Average	Rank	Eighth Finals	Quarterfinals	Semifinals	Finals	
Athlete	Event	1	2	3	4	5	6	7	8	9	10	11	12	Total	Average	Rank	Opposition Scores	Opposition Scores	Opposition Scores	Opposition Scores	Rank
Marcelo Suartz	Men's individual	205	210	179	258	241	258	196	206	193	174	159	204	2483	206.9	12th	Alejandro Cruz (MEX); W 718 – 689	Jaime Adrés Gómez (MEX); W 682 – 668	Santiago Mejía (COL); L 585 – 665 (bronze)	Did not advance	
Márcio Vieira	Men's individual	177	188	187	194	153	212	186	199	171	156	218	202	2243	186.9	25th	Did not advance				

Pairs

Athlete	Event	Block 1 (games 1–6)								Block 2 (games 7–12)								Grand total	Final rank
Athlete	Event	1	2	3	4	5	6	Total	Average	7	8	9	10	11	12	Total	Average	Grand total	Final rank
Márcio Vieira; Marcelo Suartz	Men's pairs	183	175	210	185	188	196	1137	189.5	134	184	166	174	162	233	2190	182.5	4835	4th
Márcio Vieira; Marcelo Suartz	Men's pairs	220	184	245	233	213	224	1319	219.8	225	212	195	184	268	242	2645	220.4	4835	4th

=== Women ===
Individual

Athlete	Event	Qualification															Eighth Finals	Quarterfinals	Semifinals	Finals	
Athlete	Event	Block 1 (games 1–6)						Block 2 (games 7–12)						Total	Average	Rank	Eighth Finals	Quarterfinals	Semifinals	Finals	
Athlete	Event	1	2	3	4	5	6	7	8	9	10	11	12	Total	Average	Rank	Opposition Scores	Opposition Scores	Opposition Scores	Opposition Scores	Rank
Marizete Scheer	Women's individual	179	172	243	258	214	184	170	189	199	183	193	230	2414	201.2	5th	Andrea Rojas (CHI); W 548 – 542	Elizabeth Ann Johnson (USA); L 515 – 648	Did not advance		
Stephanie Martins	Women's individual	157	202	213	178	193	186	176	189	166	198	191	180	2229	185.8	16th	Kelly Anne Kulick (USA); W 630 – 587	Caroline Lagrange (CAN); L 535 – 573	Did not advance		

Pairs

Athlete	Event	Block 1 (games 1–6)								Block 2 (games 7–12)								Grand total	Final rank
Athlete	Event	1	2	3	4	5	6	Total	Average	7	8	9	10	11	12	Total	Average	Grand total	Final rank
Stephanie Martins; Marizete Scheer	Women's pairs	189	171	178	207	209	158	1112	185.3	181	166	222	184	188	170	2223	185.3	4437	10th
Stephanie Martins; Marizete Scheer	Women's pairs	226	140	139	171	171	174	1021	170.2	183	268	175	198	191	178	2214	184.5	4437	10th

== Boxing ==
Brazil has qualified seven male boxers in the 52 kg, 56 kg, 60 kg, 64 kg, 69 kg, 75 kg, and 81 kg men's categories and two female boxers in the 60 kg and 75 kg women's categories.

=== Men ===
Athlete	Event	Preliminaries	Quarterfinals	Semifinals	Final
Athlete	Event	Opposition Result	Opposition Result	Opposition Result	Opposition Result
Juliao Henriques Nieto	Flyweight		Jhon Nelson Corona (ESA); W 25 – 5	Dagoberto Agüero Arias (DOM); L 11 – 21 (bronze)	Did not advance
Robenílson Vieira de Jesus	Bantamweight	Félix Verdejo (PUR); W 13 – 3	Deivis Neder Julio (COL); W 15 – 4	Oscar Rafael Valdez (MEX); L 10 – 23 (bronze)	Did not advance
Robson Conceição	Lightweight	Wellinton Arias (DOM); W 18 – 11	Toka Titus Kahn-Clary (USA); W 21 – 6	Angel Suárez (PUR); W 27 – 8	Yasniel Toledo (CUB); L 11 – 16 (silver)
Lopes Everton	Light welterweight	Ricardo García (DOM); W RSCH R2 3:00	Antonio Ortiz (PUR); W RET R3 3:00	Roniel Iglesias (MEX); L 9 – 18 (bronze)	Did not advance
Myke Carvalho	Welterweight	Raúl Sánchez (DOM); W 23 – 18	Patricio Villagra (CHI); W 30 – 8	Carlos Delvis Banteurt (CUB); L 14 – 14 (53 – 45) (bronze)	Did not advance
David Da Costa	Middleweight	Emilio Correa (CUB); L 4 – 12	Did not advance		
Yamaguchi Florentino	Light heavyweight		Félix Varela (DOM); W RSCH R1 3:00	Armando Piña (MEX); W 27 – 11	Julio César La Cruz (CUB); L 12 – 22 (silver)

=== Women ===
Athlete	Event	Quarterfinals	Semifinals	Final
Athlete	Event	Opposition Result	Opposition Result	Opposition Result
Adriana Araujo	Light Welterweight	Erica Rosalba Cruz (MEX); L 6 – 16	Did not advance	
Roseli Feitosa	Light heavyweight		Yenebier A. Guillén Benítez (DOM); L 12 – 21 (bronze)	Did not advance

== Canoeing ==
Brazil has qualified a total of eight boats in six men's and two women's competitions.

=== Men ===
Athlete(s)	Event	Heats		Semifinals		Final	
Athlete(s)	Event	Time	Rank	Time	Rank	Time	Rank
Wladimir Moreno	C-1 1000 m					DSQ	
Nivalter De Jesus	C-1 200 m	40.449 QF	1st			40.619	2nd place, silver medalist(s)
Ronilson Oliveira; Karel Aguilar	C-2 1000 m					3:40.482	2nd place, silver medalist(s)
Michel Ferreira	K-1 1000 m					3:44.640	4th
Edson Da Silva	K-1 200 m	37.711 QS	4th	36.146 QF	1st	36.691	5th
Roberto Maheler; Celso De Oliveira Junior	K-2 1000 m					3:19.959	4th
Givago Ribeiro; Gilvan Ribeiro	K-2 200 m	32.237	2nd			32.902	3rd place, bronze medalist(s)
Roberto Maheler; Givago Ribeiro; Gilvan Ribeiro; Celso De Oliveira Junior	K-4 1000 m					3:02.821	3rd place, bronze medalist(s)

=== Women ===
Athlete(s)	Event	Heats		Semifinals		Final	
Athlete(s)	Event	Time	Rank	Time	Rank	Time	Rank
Ariela Pinto	K-1 200 m	43.227 QF	3rd			43.706	5th
Naiane Pereira	K-1 500 m	2:00.639 QF	2nd			1:57.122	4th
Naiane Pereira; Ana Paula Vergutz	K-2 500 m	1:53.948 QF	3rd			1:53.114	6th
Naiane Pereira; Ana Paula Vergutz; Ariela Pinto; Bruna Gama	K-4 500 m					1:39.921	5th

== Cycling ==
=== Road cycling ===
==== Men ====
Athlete	Event	Time	Rank
Rafael Adriato	Road race	3:45:02	13th
Gregolry Panizo	Road race	3:45:06	24th
Murilo Fischer	Road race	DNF	
Marlor Rodman	Road race	DNF	
Gregolry Panizo	Time trial	52:32.00	13th

==== Women ====
Athlete	Event	Time	Rank
Clemilda Silva	Road race	2:18:23	13th
Uênia Fernandes de Souza	Road race	2:18:23	15th
Janildes Silva	Road race	2:18:23	20th

=== Track cycling ===
Brazil has qualified 9 athletes, 5 male and 4 female, to compete in the BMX competition.

==== Sprints and pursuit ====
Athlete	Event	Qualifying		Round of 16	1/8 finals (repechage)	Quarterfinals	Semifinals	Final	
Athlete	Event	Time Speed (km/h)	Rank	Opposition Time Speed	Opposition Time Speed	Opposition Time Speed	Opposition Time Speed	Opposition Time Speed	Rank
Flavio Cipriano	Men's sprint	10.188	8th	James David Watkins (USA); L 10.549	Did not advance				
Armando Camargo Filho; Tiago Nardin; Robson Dias; Luiz Carlos Tavarez	Men's team pursuit	4:14.634	6th					Did not advance	
Sumaia Ribeiro	Women's sprint	11.336	4th			Juliana Gaviria (COL); L	Did not advance		
Sumaia Ribeiro; Clemilda Silva	Women's team sprint	DSQ						Did not advance	
Uênia Fernandes de Souza; Clemilda Silva; Janildes Silva	Women's team pursuit	3:37.903	7th			Did not advance			

==== Keirin ====
Athlete	Event	1st round	Repechage	Final
Flavio Cipriano	Men's keirin	3rd	2nd	6th
Déborah Coronel	Women's keirin			4th

==== Omnium ====
Athlete	Event	Flying Lap Time Rank	Points Race Points Rank	Elimination Race Rank	Ind Pursuit Time	Scratch Race Rank	Time Trial Time	Final Rank
Robson Dias	Men	13.616; 7th	DNF; 21st	6th	4:42.655; 9th	-2; 6th	1:05.385; 5th	54; 8th
Janildes Silva	Women	15.670; 9th	15; 6th	8th	3:50.184; 7th	10th	39.608; 9th	49; 7th

=== Mountain biking ===
Brazil has qualified 3 athletes, 2 male and 1 female, to compete in the BMX competition.

==== Men ====
Athlete	Event	Time	Rank
Rubens Valeriano	Cross-country	1:36:39	6th
Edivando Cruz	Cross-country	1:36:50	11th

==== Women ====
Athlete	Event	Time	Rank
Erika Gramiscelli	Cross-country	1:50:43	12th

=== BMX ===
Brazil has qualified four athletes, two male and two female, to compete in the BMX competition.

Athlete	Event	Qualifying Run 1		Qualifying Run 2		Qualifying Run 3		Qualifying	Semifinal		Final	
Athlete	Event	Time	Points	Time	Points	Time	Points	Points	Points	Rank	Time	Rank
Renato Rezende	Men	36.703	3	36.489	2	37.407	4	9	35.197	4th	36.267	5th
Deivlim Balthazar	Men	39.177	5	44.269	4	33.333	4	13	57.937	6th	Did not advance	
Naiara Silva	Women	54.011	4	47.936	4	52.219	4	12			47.944	6th
Squel Stein	Women	DNF	5	DSQ	7	DSQ	7	19			Did not advance	

== Diving ==
=== Men ===
Athlete(s)	Event	Preliminary		Final	
Athlete(s)	Event	Points	Rank	Points	Rank
César Castro	3 m springboard	435.95	6th Q	462.15	3rd place, bronze medalist(s)
Hugo Parisi	10 m platform	430.50	5th Q	451.45	6th
Rui Marinho	10 m platform	358.45	10th Q	315.85	11th
César Castro; Ian Matos	3 m synchronized springboard			377.79	4th
Rui Marinho; Hugo Parisi	10 m synchronized platform			366.75	6th

=== Women ===
Athlete(s)	Event	Preliminary		Final	
Athlete(s)	Event	Points	Rank	Points	Rank
Juliana Veloso	3 m springboard	295.60	5th Q	327.70	6th
Bruna Mangueira	3 m springboard	181.05	14th R	Did not advance	
Andressa Mendes	10 m platform	253.05	10th Q	279.95	5th
Natali Cruz	10 m platform	225.75	11th Q	219.00	12th
Natali Cruz; Andressa Mendes	3 m synchronized springboard			202.32	6th
Natali Cruz; Andressa Mendes	10 m synchronized platform			226.71	6th

== Equestrian ==
=== Dressage ===
Athlete	Horse	Event	Grand Prix		Grand Prix Special		Grand Prix Freestyle		Final score^{1}	Rank
Athlete	Horse	Event	Score	Rank	Score	Rank	Score	Rank	Final score^{1}	Rank
Mauro Pereira Junior	Tulum Comando Sn	Individual	68.737	12th Q	70.711	11th Q	74.275	9th	72.493	9th
Rogerio Clementino	Sargento Do Top	Individual	67.000	17th Q	66.974	15th Q	72.550	10th	69.762	12th
Luiza Almeida	Pastor	Individual	68.237	13th Q	65.947	20th Q	Did not advance			
Leandro Silva	VDL Lácteur	Individual	63.895	30th	Did not advance					
Pedro Manuel Almeida; Leandro Silva; Luiza Almeida; Rogerio Clementino; Mauro Pereira Junior	Viheste; VDL Lácteur; Pastor; Sargento Do Top; Tulum Comando Sn	Team	67.991	5th					67.991	5th

=== Eventing ===
Athlete	Horse	Event	Dressage		Cross-country		Jumping				Total	
Athlete	Horse	Event	Dressage		Cross-country		Qualifier		Final		Total	
Athlete	Horse	Event	Penalties	Rank	Penalties	Rank	Penalties	Rank	Penalties	Rank	Penalties	Rank
Ruy Fonseca Filho	Tom Bombadil Too	Individual	50.40	6th	Did not advance							
Marcio Jorge	Josephine MCJ	Individual	52.80	12th	10.00	13th	4.00	11th	5.00	9th	71.80	9th
Marcelo Tosi	Eleda All Black	Individual	59.50	24th	14.80	26th	0.00	24th	5.00	18th	99.30	18th
Serguei Fofanoff	Barbara TW	Individual	59.80	26th	2.00	11th	0	8th	Did not advance			
Jesper Martendal	Land Jimmy	Individual	65.20	36th	0.00	14th	16.00	21st	0.00	12th	81.20	12th
Jesper Martendal; Marcelo Tosi; Marcio Jorge; Ruy Fonseca Filho; Serguei Fofanoff	Land Jimmy; Eleda All Black; Josephine MCJ; Tom Bombadil Too; Barbara TW	Team	162.70	3rd	26.80	3rd	20.00	3rd			209.80	3rd place, bronze medalist(s)

=== Individual jumping ===
Athlete	Horse	Event	Ind. 1st Qualifier		Ind. 2nd Qualifier			Ind. 3rd Qualifier			Ind. Final					
Athlete	Horse	Event	Ind. 1st Qualifier		Ind. 2nd Qualifier			Ind. 3rd Qualifier			Round A		Round B		Total	
Athlete	Horse	Event	Penalties	Rank	Penalties	Total	Rank	Penalties	Total	Rank	Penalties	Rank	Penalties	Rank	Penalties	Rank
Bernardo Alves	Bridgit	Individual	2.09	8th	0.00	2.09	5th	0.00	2.09	4th	0.00	1st	0.00	1st	2.09	3rd place, bronze medalist(s)
Alvaro Miranda Neto	Ad Norson	Individual	2.62	9th	0.00	2.62	6th	8.00	10.62	14th	8.00	18th	Did not advance			24th
Rodrigo Pessoa	HH Ashley	Individual	2.87	10th	0.00	2.87	7th	0.00	2.87	6th	Did not advance					26th
Karina Johannpeter	SRF Dragonfly de Joter	Individual	5.52	22nd	0.00	5.52	13th	4.00	9.52	12th	4.00	11th	16.00	20th	29.52	15th

=== Team jumping ===
Athlete	Horse	Event	Qualification Round		Final					
Athlete	Horse	Event	Qualification Round		Round 1		Round 2		Total	
Athlete	Horse	Event	Penalties	Rank	Penalties	Rank	Penalties	Rank	Penalties	Rank
Alvaro Miranda Neto; Bernardo Alves; Karina Johannpeter; Rodrigo Pessoa	Ad Norson; Bridgit; SRF Dragonfly de Joter; HH Ashley	Team	7.58	3rd	0.00	2nd	4.00	2nd	11.58	2nd place, silver medalist(s)

== Fencing ==
Brazil has qualified men's and women's athletes in the foil and sabre competitions and women's athletes in the épée competition.

=== Men ===
Event	Athlete	Round of Poules		Round of 16	Quarterfinals	Semifinals	Final
Event	Athlete	Result	Seed	Opposition Score	Opposition Score	Opposition Score	Opposition Score
Individual foil	Guilherme Toldo	1 V – 4 D	16th Q	Miles Chamley-Watson (USA); W 15 – 13	Etienne Lalonde (CAN); W 15 – 7	Alexander Massialas (USA); L 7 – 15 (bronze)	Did not advance
Individual foil	Heitor Shimbo	1 V – 4 D	17th	Did not advance			
Individual sabre	Renzo Agresta	5 V – 0 D	2nd Q	John Lopez (ESA); W 15 – 3	Joseph Polossifakis (CAN); L 12 – 15	Did not advance	
Individual sabre	William De Moraes	2 V – 3 D	12th Q	Daylon Gilberto Diaz (CUB); L 7 – 15	Did not advance		
Team foil	Guilherme Toldo; Heitor Shimbo; Fernando Scavasin				Chile; W 45 – 31	Canada; L 40 – 45	Bronze medal match Mexico; W 45 – 43 (bronze)
Team sabre	Renzo Agresta; William De Moraes; Tywilliam Pacheco				Chile; W 45 – 19	United States; L 36 – 45	Bronze medal match Venezuela; W 45 – 44 (bronze)

=== Women ===
Event	Athlete	Round of Poules		Round of 16	Quarterfinals	Semifinals	Final
Event	Athlete	Result	Seed	Opposition Score	Opposition Score	Opposition Score	Opposition Score
Individual foil	Ana Bulcao	3 V – 2 D	6th Q	Nataly Michel (MEX); L 12 – 15	Did not advance		
Individual foil	Amanda Simeão	1 V – 4 D	16th Q	Mariana González (ECU); L 3 – 15	Did not advance		
Individual épée	Rayssa De Oliveira	1 V – 4 D	15th Q	Kelley Hurley (USA); L 6 – 15	Did not advance		
Individual épée	Clarisse De Menezes	1 V – 4 D	16th Q	Yamirka Rodriguez (CUB); L 10 – 15	Did not advance		
Individual sabre	Élora Pattaro	3 V – 2 D	8th Q	Yaritza Goulet (CUB); L 5 – 15	Did not advance		
Individual sabre	Karina Lakerbai	1 V – 4 D	17th	Did not advance			
Team épée	Rayssa De Oliveira; Clarisse De Menezes; Amanda Simeão				Argentina; L 38 – 39	5th-8th place Match; Panama; L 35 – 45	7th-8th place Match; Cuba; W 45 – 43
Team sabre	Élora Pattaro; Karina Lakerbai; Beatriz Almeida				Venezuela; L 39 – 45	5th-8th place Match; Panama; W 45 – 39	5th-6th place Match; Cuba; L 29 – 45

== Football ==
Brazil has qualified a men's and women's team in the football competition.

=== Men ===
- Felipe Amorim
- Lucas Benetao
- Misael Bueno
- Sebastião Couto Junior
- Romário De Moura
- Rafael De Souza
- Luccas dos Santos
- Madson dos Santos
- Cesar Dutra
- Alcides Farias Junior
- Djair Francisco Junior
- Felipe Anderson Gomes
- Lucas Goncalves
- Weverson Moura
- Henrique Nascentes
- Douglas Pires
- Henrique Ribeiro
- Rodrigo Santos

Men's team will participate in Group B of the football tournament.

Pos	Team	Pld	W	D	L	GF	GA	GD	Pts	Qualification
1	Argentina	3	2	1	0	5	1	+4	7	Advance to Semifinals
2	Costa Rica	3	2	0	1	4	4	0	6	Advance to Semifinals
3	Brazil	3	0	2	1	2	4	−2	2	
4	Cuba	3	0	1	2	0	2	−2	1	

October 19, 2011
17:00

Argentina	1 – 1	Brazil
Araujo 74'	Report	Henrique 63'

Estadio Omnilife, Guadalajara
Referee: Omar Ponce (Ecuador)

October 21, 2011
17:00

Brazil	0 – 0	Cuba
	Report

Estadio Omnilife, Guadalajara
Referee: Raúl Orosco (Bolivia)

October 23, 2011
20:00

Brazil	1 – 3	Costa Rica
Henrique 30'	Report	B. Vega 1'; McDonald 20', 43'

Estadio Omnilife, Guadalajara
Referee: Ricardo Arellano (Mexico)

=== Women ===
- Francielle Alberto
- Rosana Augusto
- Barbara Barbosa
- Daniele Batista
- Renata Costa
- Debora De Oliveira
- Maurine Goncalves
- Thais Guedes
- Beatriz Joao
- Miraildes Mota
- Grazielle Nascimento
- Tania Pereira
- Thais Picarte
- Karen Rocha
- Daiane Rodrigues
- Andreia Santos
- Renata Santos
- Ketlen Wiggers

The women's team will participate in Group B of the football tournament.

Pos	Team	Pld	W	D	L	GF	GA	GD	Pts	Qualification
1	Brazil	3	2	1	0	4	1	+3	7	Advance to Semifinals
2	Canada	3	2	1	0	4	1	+3	7	Advance to Semifinals
3	Costa Rica	3	0	1	2	5	8	−3	1	
4	Argentina	3	0	1	2	3	6	−3	1	

October 18, 2011
17:00

Argentina	0 – 2	Brazil
	Report	Guedes 27'; Batista 37'

Estadio Omnilife, Guadalajara
Referee: Lucila Venegas (Mexico)

October 20, 2011
17:00

Brazil	2 – 1	Costa Rica
De Oliveira 59'; Guedes 62'	Report	Cruz 90+5'

Estadio Omnilife, Guadalajara
Referee: Diane Ferreiras (Guyana)

October 22, 2011
20:00

Brazil	0 – 0	Canada
	Report

Estadio Omnilife, Guadalajara
Referee: Irasema Aguilera (Cuba)

==== Semifinals ====
October 25, 2011
17:00

Mexico	0 – 1	Brazil
	Report	Goncalves 79'

Estadio Omnilife, Guadalajara
Referee: Irasema Aguilera (Cuba)

==== Gold medal match ====
October 27, 2011
17:45

Brazil	1 – 1 (a.e.t.)	Canada
De Oliveira 3'	Report	Sinclair 87'
Penalties
Alberto (penalty scored); Goncalves (penalty scored); Nascimento (penalty missed); Wiggers (penalty scored); De Oliveira (penalty missed)	3 – 4	(penalty scored) Matheson; (penalty scored) Sinclair; (penalty scored) Booth; (penalty scored) Schmidt; (penalty missed) Chapman

Estadio Omnilife, Guadalajara
Referee: Diane Ferreiras (Guyana)

== Gymnastics ==
=== Artistic ===
Brazil has qualified six male and six female athletes in the artistic gymnastics competition.

==== Men ====
Individual qualification & Team Finals

Athlete	Event	Apparatus						Qualification		Final	
Athlete	Event	Vault	Floor	Pommel horse	Rings	Parallel bars	Horizontal bar	Total	Rank	Total	Rank
Francisco Barretto	Ind Qualification			13.850	14.100	13.900	12.750	54.600	44th		
Petrix Barbosa	Ind Qualification	15.550	14.000	12.450	13.750	14.200	14.100	84.050	8th		
Pericles Da Silva	Ind Qualification	14.450	13.850	13.850	13.800	13.900	13.650	83.500	10th		
Diego Hypólito	Ind Qualification	15.400	15.600	12.900		14.050	13.700	71.650	31st		
Arthur Zanetti	Ind Qualification	15.800	14.400		15.550			45.750	48th		
Sergio Sasaki Junior	Ind Qualification	16.050	14.650	14.600	13.850	14.550	14.000	87.700	1st		
Team Totals; Four Best Scores	Team All-around	62.800	58.650	55.200	57.300	56.700	55.450			346.100	1st place, gold medalist(s)

Individual Finals

Athlete	Event	Final							
Athlete	Event	Vault	Floor	Pommel horse	Rings	Parallel bars	Horizontal bar	Total	Rank
Diego Hypólito	Individual Floor		15.800					15.800	1st place, gold medalist(s)
Diego Hypólito	Individual Vault	15.875						15.875	1st place, gold medalist(s)
Arthur Zanetti	Individual Rings				15.600			15.600	2nd place, silver medalist(s)
Petrix Barbosa	Individual All-around	15.450	14.050	13.350	13.450	12.100	11.400	79.850	15th
Petrix Barbosa	Individual Horizontal Bar						14.300	14.300	4th
Sergio Sasaki Junior	Individual All-around	NM	NM	13.800	13.800	NM	NM	27.600	21st
Sergio Sasaki Junior	Individual Parallel Bars					14.800		14.800	5th
Sergio Sasaki Junior	Individual Pommel Horse			12.850				12.850	7th

==== Women ====
Individual qualification & Team Finals

Athlete	Event	Apparatus				Qualification		Final	
Athlete	Event	Vault	Floor	Balance Beam	Uneven bars	Total	Rank	Total	Rank
Adrian Nunes	Ind Qualification	14.225	12.475	13.050	11.900	51.650	20th		
Priscila Cobello	Ind Qualification		12.550	13.500	11.100	37.150	48th		
Daiane dos Santos	Ind Qualification	14.125	12.625		12.150	38.900	46th		
Gabriela Soares	Ind Qualification	13.600		11.850		25.450	52nd		
Bruna Leal	Ind Qualification	13.800	12.775	13.375	12.650	52.600	14th		
Daniele Hypólito	Ind Qualification	14.025	13.375	13.500	12.200	53.100	8th		
Team Totals; Four Best Scores	Team All-around	56.175	53.425	48.900	51.325			209.825	5th

Individual Finals

Athlete	Event	Final					
Athlete	Event	Vault	Floor	Balance Beam	Uneven bars	Total	Rank
Daniele Hypólito	Individual All-around	14.125	13.825	13.675	12.550	54.175	7th
Daniele Hypólito	Individual Vault	13.587				13.587	6th
Daniele Hypólito	Individual Floor		13.750			13.750	3rd place, bronze medalist(s)
Daniele Hypólito	Individual Balance Beam			13.750		13.750	3rd place, bronze medalist(s)
Adrian Nunes	Ind Qualification	14.125	13.100	12.975	11.500	51.700	12th
Adrian Nunes	Individual Vault	13.962				13.962	4th

=== Rhythmic ===
Brazil has qualified two individual athletes and one team in the rhythmic gymnastics competition.

Individual

Athlete	Event	Final					
Athlete	Event	Hoop	Ball	Clubs	Ribbon	Total	Rank
Angélica Kvieczynski	Individual all-around	25.075	24.375	24.700	24.050	98.200	3rd place, bronze medalist(s)
Angélica Kvieczynski	Hoop	25.000				25.000	3rd place, bronze medalist(s)
Angélica Kvieczynski	Ball		24.700			24.700	3rd place, bronze medalist(s)
Angélica Kvieczynski	Clubs			25.150		25.150	2nd place, silver medalist(s)
Angélica Kvieczynski	Ribbon				23.825	23.825	6th
Natalia Gaudio	Individual all-around	23.850	22.525	21.400	22.950	90.725	10th
Natalia Gaudio	Hoop	23.575				23.575	7th

Group

Athletes	Event	Final			
Athletes	Event	5 balls	3 ribbons & 2 hoops	Total	Rank
Dayane Amaral; Drielly Daltoe; Debora Falda; Luisa Matsuo; Bianca Mendonça; Eliane Sampaio	Group all-around	25.100	23.475	48.575	1st place, gold medalist(s)
Dayane Amaral; Drielly Daltoe; Debora Falda; Luisa Matsuo; Bianca Mendonça; Eliane Sampaio	Group 5 Balls	25.050		25.050	1st place, gold medalist(s)
Dayane Amaral; Drielly Daltoe; Debora Falda; Luisa Matsuo; Bianca Mendonça; Eliane Sampaio	Group 3 Ribbons & 2 Hoops		24.775	24.775	1st place, gold medalist(s)

=== Trampoline ===
Brazil has qualified two male and two female athletes in the trampoline gymnastics competition.

=== Men ===
Athlete	Event	Qualification		Final	
Athlete	Event	Score	Rank	Score	Rank
Rafael Andrade	Individual	95.900	2nd Q	52.265	2nd place, silver medalist(s)
Carlos Ramirez Pala	Individual	45.015	8th Q	12.180	5th

=== Women ===
Athlete	Event	Qualification		Final	
Athlete	Event	Score	Rank	Score	Rank
Giovanna Matheus	Individual	95.565	4th Q	21.115	5th
Daienne Lima	Individual	90.990	6th Q	15.250	6th

== Handball ==
Brazil has qualified the men's and women's teams to the handball competitions.

Men

- Leonardo Bortoloni
- Gustavo Cardoso
- Fábio Chiuffa
- Bruno De Santana
- Marcos Paulo Dos Santos
- Thiagus Dos Santos
- Jaqson Kojoroski
- Fernando Pacheco Filho
- Gil Pires
- Felipe Ribeiro
- Renato Ruy
- Maik Santos
- Ales Silva
- Henrique Texeira
- Vinicius Texeira

Group A

Pos	Team	Pld	W	D	L	GF	GA	GD	Pts	Qualification
1	Brazil	3	3	0	0	119	54	+65	6	Semifinals
2	Chile	3	2	0	1	101	89	+12	4	Semifinals
3	Canada	3	1	0	2	70	113	−43	2	5th–8th place semifinals
4	Venezuela	3	0	0	3	68	102	−34	0	5th–8th place semifinals

Source: Guadalajara 2011
Rules for classification: 1) points; 2) head-to-head points; 3) head-to-head goal difference; 4) head-to-head goals scored; 5) goal difference; 6) goals scored; 7) draw.

October 16; 13:00	Brazil	46 – 17	Canada	San Rafael Gymnasium; Referees: Prieto, Gonzalez (URU)
October 16; 13:00	two players, 7	Report	Godin, 4	San Rafael Gymnasium; Referees: Prieto, Gonzalez (URU)

October 18; 20:00	Venezuela	15 – 37	Brazil	San Rafael Gymnasium; Referees: Perez, Guzman (PUR)
October 18; 20:00	two players, 3	Report	Ruy, 7	San Rafael Gymnasium; Referees: Perez, Guzman (PUR)

October 20; 13:00	Brazil	36 – 22	Chile	San Rafael Gymnasium; Referees: Prieto, Gonzalez (URU)
October 20; 13:00	Ribeiro, 10	Report	Two players, 5	San Rafael Gymnasium; Referees: Prieto, Gonzalez (URU)

Semifinals

October 22; 10:00	Brazil	41 – 17	Dominican Republic	San Rafael Gymnasium; Referees: Minore, Marina (ARG)
October 22; 10:00	Chiuffa, 6	Report	four players, 3	San Rafael Gymnasium; Referees: Minore, Marina (ARG)

Gold medal match

October 24; 20:00	Brazil	23 – 26	Argentina	San Rafael Gymnasium; Referees: Raluy, Sabroso (ESP)
October 24; 20:00	Three players, 6	Report	Two Players, 6	San Rafael Gymnasium; Referees: Raluy, Sabroso (ESP)

2011 Pan American Games Silver medal

Brazil

Women

- Eduarda Amorim
- Bárbara Arenhart
- Moniki Bancilon
- Francine Cararo
- Deonise Cavaleiro
- Fernanda da Silva
- Fabiana Diniz
- Alexandra do Nascimento
- Mayara Moura
- Daniela Piedade
- Silvia Pinheiro
- Jéssica Quintino
- Samira Rocha
- Ana Paula Rodrigues
- Chana Masson

Group B

Pos	Team	Pld	W	D	L	GF	GA	GD	Pts	Qualification
1	Brazil	3	3	0	0	125	43	+82	6	Semifinals
2	Dominican Republic	3	1	1	1	75	82	−7	3	Semifinals
3	Uruguay	3	1	1	1	75	91	−16	3	5th–8th place semifinals
4	United States	3	0	0	3	60	119	−59	0	5th–8th place semifinals

Source: Guadalajara 2011
Rules for classification: 1) points; 2) head-to-head points; 3) head-to-head goal difference; 4) head-to-head goals scored; 5) goal difference; 6) goals scored; 7) draw.

October 15; 13:00	Brazil	50–10	United States	San Rafael Gymnasium; Referees: Duran, Guzman (MEX)
October 15; 13:00	Da Silva 10	Report	Sayer 3	San Rafael Gymnasium; Referees: Duran, Guzman (MEX)

October 17; 20:00	Uruguay	15–43	Brazil	San Rafael Gymnasium; Referees: Guzman, Perez (PUR)
October 17; 20:00	Two players, 3	Report	Da Silva, 6	San Rafael Gymnasium; Referees: Guzman, Perez (PUR)

October 19; 13:00	Brazil	32–18	Dominican Republic	San Rafael Gymnasium; Referees: Martin, Pellerin (CAN)
October 19; 13:00	Da Silva, 8	Report	Granado Brito, 6	San Rafael Gymnasium; Referees: Martin, Pellerin (CAN)

Semifinals

October 21; 12:30	Brazil	43–12	Mexico	San Rafael Gymnasium; Referees: Martin, Pellerin (CAN)
October 21; 12:30	Two players, 6	Report	Jaramillo, 3	San Rafael Gymnasium; Referees: Martin, Pellerin (CAN)

Gold medal match

October 23; 20:00	Brazil	33–15	Argentina	San Rafael Gymnasium; Referees: Perez, Guzman (PUR)
October 23; 20:00	Do Nascimento 8	Report	2 players, 4	San Rafael Gymnasium; Referees: Perez, Guzman (PUR)

2011 Pan American Games Gold medal

Brazil

== Judo ==
Brazil has qualified athletes in all categories of competition.

=== Men ===
Athlete	Event	Round of 16	Quarterfinals	Semifinals	Final
Athlete	Event	Opposition Result	Opposition Result	Opposition Result	Opposition Result
Felipe Kitadai	-60 kg		Javier Antonio Guedez (VEN); W 100 – 000 S1	Aaron N. Kunhiro (USA); W 100 – 000 S1	Nabor Castillo (MEX); W 101 S1 – 000 (gold)
Leandro Cunha	-66 kg		Sasha Mehmedovic (CAN); W 100 – 000	Francisco Carreón (MEX); W 100 S1 – 000 S1	Keneth Hashimoto (USA); W 121 S1 – 000 S3 (gold)
Bruno Mendonça	-73 kg		Fernando Salazar (CHI); W 001 S1 – 000	Nicholas Tritton (CAN); W 101 S1 – 001 S2	Alejandro Clara (ARG); W 100 – 000 (gold)
Leandro Guilheiro	-81 kg	Luis Retamales (CHI); W 110 – 000 S3	German Velazco (PER); W 101 – 000 S4	Antoine Valois (CAN); W 101 – 000 S2	Gadiel Miranda (PUR); W 101 S1 – 000 S2 (gold)
Tiago Camilo	-90 kg		Alexandre Emond (CAN); W 120 – 000 S3	Isao Cardenas (MEX); W 100 S1 – 000 S1	Asley González (CUB); W 100 – 000 S1 (gold)
Luciano Corrêa	-100 kg	Carlos Santiago (PUR); W 100 – 000 S4	Kyle Vashkulat (USA); W 110 S3 – 010 S3	Sergio García (MEX) 'W 110' S2 – 001 S1	Oreydi Despaigne (CUB); W 010 S2 – 001 S3 (gold)
Rafael Silva	+100 kg		Anthony Turner Jr. (USA); W 100 S2 – 001 S4	Ramon Enrique Flores (MEX); W 100 – 000 S4	Oscar Rene Brayson (CUB); L 000 – 010 (silver)

=== Women ===
Athlete	Event	Round of 16	Quarterfinals	Semifinals	Final
Athlete	Event	Opposition Result	Opposition Result	Opposition Result	Opposition Result
Sarah Menezes	-48 kg		Angela Woosley (USA); W 100 – 000 S1	Dayris Rosa Mestre (CUB); L 000 S1 – 001 S1	Did not advance (to repechage round)
Érika Miranda	-52 kg		Laurie Wiltshire (CAN); W 120 – 000 S3	Oritia del Carmen Gonzalez (ARG); W 100 S1 – 000 S1	Yanet Bermoy (CUB); L 000 – 101 (silver)
Rafaela Silva	-57 kg		Joliane Melançon (CAN); W 101 S1 – 000 S2	Yadinis Amarís (COL); W 011 – 000 S3	Yurisleidy Lupetey (CUB); L 000 – 001 (silver)
Katherine Campos	-63 kg		Jessica Garcia (PUR); W 002 S1 – 000 S2	Karina Paloma Acosta (MEX); L 001 S3 – 010 S2	Did not advance (to repechage round)
Maria Portela	-70 kg		Vanessa Chala (ECU); W 100 – 000	Yuri Alvear (COL); L 000 S1 – 100	Did not advance (to repechage round)
Mayra Aguiar	-78 kg	Diana Veronica Chala (ECU); W 100 – 000 S1	Kayla Jean Harrison (USA); L 000 S2 – 001	Did not advance (to repechage round)	
Maria Suelen Altheman	+78 kg		Giovanna Jose Blanco (VEN); W 001 S1 – 000 S1	Melissa Mojica (PUR); L 000 – 100	Did not advance (to repechage round)

Repechage Rounds

Athlete	Event	First Repechage Round	Repechage Quarterfinals	Repechage Semifinals	Bronze Final
Athlete	Event	Opposition Result	Opposition Result	Opposition Result	Opposition Result
Sarah Menezes	-48 kg				Luiz Adiela Alvarez (USA); W 101 S1 – 000 S1 (bronze)
Katherine Campos	-63 kg				Stéfanie Tremblay (CAN); L 000 S2 – 101 S1
Maria Portela	-70 kg				Kathleen Helen Sell (USA); W 101 S1 – 000 S2 (bronze)
Mayra Aguiar	-78 kg			Lenia Ruvalcaba (MEX); W 100 – 000	Lorena Andrea Briceño (ARG); W 100 – 000 (bronze)
Maria Suelen Altheman	+78 kg				Molly O'Rourke (USA); W 100 – 000 (bronze)

== Karate ==
Brazil has qualified three male athletes in the 60 kg, 84 kg, and 84+kg categories and three female athletes in the 50 kg, 55 kg, and 68 kg categories.

Athlete	Event	Round robin (Pool A/B)			Semifinals	Final
Athlete	Event	Match 1	Match 2	Match 3	Semifinals	Final
Athlete	Event	Opposition Result	Opposition Result	Opposition Result	Opposition Result	Opposition Result
Douglas Brose	Men's -60 kg	Norberto Sosa (DOM); HKW 2:2	Dennis Lazo (PER); W PTS 1:0	Manuel Araujo (MEX); HKW 1:1	Andrés Rendón (COL); L PTS 1:2 (bronze)	Did not advance
Wellington Barbosa	Men's +84 kg	Franco Recouso (ARG); W PTS 2:1	Angel Aponte (VEN); W PTS 1:0	Jorge Merino (ESA); HKW 1:1	Alberto Ramírez (MEX); L PTS 0:2 (bronze)	Did not advance
Jessica Candido	Women's -50 kg	Paula Ruiz (COL); W PTS 5:0	Tyler Wolfe (USA); HKW 0:0	Gabriela Bruna (CHI); L PTS 2:3	Ana Villanueva (DOM); L PTS 0:1 (bronze)	Did not advance
Valéria Kumizaki	Women's -55 kg	Yanelsis Gongora (CUB); W PTS 1:0	Jacqueline Factos (ECU); W PTS 4:0	Karina Diaz (DOM); L PTS 0:1	Shannon Nishi (USA); L PTS 1:3 (bronze)	Did not advance
Lucelia Ribeiro	Women's -68 kg	Ashley Binns Miranda (CRC); W PTS 6:1	Yoandra Moreno (CUB); HKW 0:0	Elizabeth Retamal (CHI); W PTS 1:0	Yoly Guillen (VEN); W HAN 1:1	Yadira Lira (MEX); W HAN 0:0 (gold)
Jeanis Colzani	Women's +68 kg	Olivia Grant (CAN); L PTS 1:2	Claudia Vera (CHI); L PTS 0:1	Yelsi Piña (VEN); HKW 0:0	Did not advance	

== Modern pentathlon ==
Brazil has qualified two male and two female pentathletes.

=== Men ===
Athlete	Fencing (épée one touch)			Swimming (200m freestyle)			Riding (show jumping)			Combined			Total points	Final rank
Athlete	Results	Rank	MP points	Time	Rank	MP points	Penalties	Rank	MP points	Time	Rank	MP points	Total points	Final rank
Luis Armando Magno	10 V – 14 D	18th	736	2:06.91	2nd	1280	24	12th	1176	11:53.62	9th	2144	5336	11th
Wagner Romao	13 V – 11 D	11th	856	2:07.22	3rd	1276	144	19th	1056	12:03.53	13th	2104	5292	12th

Women

Athlete	Fencing (épée one touch)			Swimming (200m freestyle)			Riding (show jumping)			Combined			Total points	Final rank
Athlete	Results	Rank	MP points	Time	Rank	MP points	Penalties	Rank	MP points	Time	Rank	MP points	Total points	Final rank
Yane Marques	24 V – 8 D	2nd	1056	2:12.41	1st	1212	-	2nd	1200	13:22.13	4th	1792	5260	2nd place, silver medalist(s)
Priscila Oliveira	15 V – 17 D	10th	804	2:17.10	2nd	1056	36	8th	1164	14:12.46	11th	1592	4716	9th

== Roller skating ==
=== Men ===
Artistic

Athlete	Event	Short program		Long program		Total score	Final rank
Athlete	Event	Score	Rank	Score	Rank	Total score	Final rank
Marcel Sturmer	Free skating	130.6	1st	134.20	1st	533.20	1st place, gold medalist(s)

=== Women ===
Artistic

Athlete	Event	Short program		Long program		Total score	Final rank
Athlete	Event	Score	Rank	Score	Rank	Total score	Final rank
Talitha Haas	Free skating	116.50	4th	122.70	3rd	484.60	3rd place, bronze medalist(s)

== Rowing ==
=== Men ===
Athlete(s)	Event	Heats		Repechage		Final	
Athlete(s)	Event	Time	Rank	Time	Rank	Time	Rank
Thiago Gomes; Ronaldo Vargas	Lightweight double sculls (LM2×)	6:34.16	2nd R	6:48.64	2nd F	6:35.60	5th
João Borges Junior; Alexis Mestre	Coxless pair (M2-)	6:46.31	1st F			6:48.74	2nd place, silver medalist(s)
Celio Amorim; Leandro Atoji; Anderson Nocetti; Ailson Silva	Coxless four (M4-)	6:53.42	3rd R	6:37.50	4th F	6:11.72	6th
Thiago Almeida; Celio Amorim; Ailson Silva; José Sobral Júnior	Lightweight coxless four (LM4-)	6:25.15	3rd R	6:22.27	2nd F	6:15.61	6th
Leandro Atoji; Allan Bitencourt; João Borges Junior; Claudio Da Silva; Thiago Gomes; Alexis Mestre; Anderson Nocetti; Leandro Tozzo; Ronaldo Vargas	Eight (M8+)	7:42.26	6th F			5:50.43	6th

=== Women ===
Athlete(s)	Event	Heats		Repechage		Final	
Athlete(s)	Event	Time	Rank	Time	Rank	Time	Rank
Kyssia Costa	Single sculls (W1×)	8:12.90	2nd F			8:23.21	6th
Fabiana Beltrame	Lightweight single sculls (LW1×)	8:20.18	1st F			7:55.42	2nd place, silver medalist(s)
Mianca Miarka; Carolina Rocha	Double sculls (W2×)	7:59.38	3rd R	7:23.90	2nd F	7:21.32	5th
Camila Carvalho; Luciana Granato	Lightweight double sculls (LW2×)	7:36.21	5th F			7:32.49	5th
Camila Carvalho; Kyssia Costa |Mianca Miarka; Carolina Rocha	Quadruple sculls (W4×)	7:12.14	5th F			6:45.57	6th

== Rugby sevens ==
Brazil has qualified a team to participate in rugby sevens. It will consist of 12 athletes.

Team

- Erik Cogliardo
- Joao Luiz Da Roz
- Rafael Dawalibi
- Lucas Duque
- Moisés Duque
- Daniel Gregg
- Diego Lopes
- Henrique Pinto
- Fernando Portugal
- Diogo Santos
- Felipe Silva
- Jefferson Silva

Team	Pld	W	D	L	PF	PA	PD	Pts
Canada	3	3	0	0	109	28	+81	12
United States	3	1	1	1	54	55	−1	7
Brazil	3	1	1	1	33	71	−38	7
Chile	3	0	0	3	21	63	−42	3

October 29, 2011
11:25

Canada	45 – 0	Brazil
	Report

Tlaquepaque Stadium, Guadalajara

October 29, 2011
13:10

United States	19 – 19	Brazil
Tries: Unufe (2), Pulu; Con: Niua (2/3)	Report	Tries: Portugal, Cogliandro, Silva; Con: Duque (2/3)

Tlaquepaque Stadium, Guadalajara

October 29, 2011
15:40

Brazil	14 – 7	Chile
	Report

Tlaquepaque Stadium, Guadalajara

=== Quarterfinals ===
October 30, 2011
9:25

Brazil	0 – 7	Uruguay
	Report

Tlaquepaque Stadium, Guadalajara

=== Fifth to eighth place ===
October 30, 2011
11:10

Chile	19 – 14	Brazil
	Report

Tlaquepaque Stadium, Guadalajara

=== Seventh place match ===
October 30, 2011
13:30

Brazil	26 – 7	Guyana
	Report

Tlaquepaque Stadium, Guadalajara

== Sailing ==
Brazil has qualified boats in all categories.

=== Men ===
Athlete	Event	Race											Net points	Final rank
Athlete	Event	1	2	3	4	5	6	7	8	9	10	M	Net points	Final rank
Ricardo Santos	Windsurfer (RS:X)	(3)	1	1	1	2	3	1	1	2	1	2	15.0	1st place, gold medalist(s)
Bruno Fontes	Single-handed Dinghy (Laser)	2	2	10	4	5	7	(14); DNF	1	4	4	10	49.0	5th

=== Women ===
Athlete	Event	Race											Net points	Final rank
Athlete	Event	1	2	3	4	5	6	7	8	9	10	M	Net points	Final rank
Patricia Freitas	Windsurfer (RS:X)	(2)	1	1	1	2	1	1	1	1	1	2	12.0	1st place, gold medalist(s)
Adriana Kostiw	Single-handed Dinghy (Laser Radial)	4	4	12	10	11	9	(13)	9	12	12	/	83.0	11th

=== Open ===
Athlete	Event	Race											Net points	Final rank
Athlete	Event	1	2	3	4	5	6	7	8	9	10	M	Net points	Final rank
Bernardo Arndt; Bruno Oliveira	Multihull (Hobie 16)	2	2	5	6	2	1	1	3	1	(8)	4	27.0	2nd place, silver medalist(s)
Alezandre Da Silva; Guilherme Hamelmann; Mauricio Oliveira; Daniel Santiago	Keelboat (J/24)	2	3	1	1	2	(6)	1	6	1	3	6	26.0	1st place, gold medalist(s)
Claudio Biekarck; Marcelo da Silva; Gunnar Ficker	Multi-crewed Dinghy (Lightning)	3	1	(7)	2	2	3	5	3	6	1	8	34.0	3rd place, bronze medalist(s)
Gabriel Borges; Alexandre Do Amaral	Double-handed Dinghy (Snipe)	5	1	4	3	3	1	3.3; RDG	6	1	(8)	6	33.3	1st place, gold medalist(s)
Matheus Dellangello	Single-handed Dinghy (Sunfish)	2	1	1	(4)	1	1	1	1	1	1	2	12.0	1st place, gold medalist(s)

== Shooting ==
=== Men ===
Event	Athlete	Qualification		Final	
Event	Athlete	Score	Rank	Score	Rank
10 m air pistol	Júlio Almeida	575-16x	5th Q	675.2	3rd place, bronze medalist(s)
10 m air pistol	Felipe Wu	566-16x	13th	Did not advance	
10 m air rifle	Bruno Heck	584-31x	9th	Did not advance	
10 m air rifle	Rocco Rosito	581-30x	14th	Did not advance	
25 m rapid fire pistol	Emerson Duarte	574-14x	2nd Q	591.0	4th
25 m rapid fire pistol	Iosef Forma	553- 9x	10th	Did not advance	
50 m pistol	Júlio Almeida	545- 7x	6th Q	639.9	3rd place, bronze medalist(s)
50 m pistol	Stenio Yamamoto	545- 8x	5th Q	631.5	7th
50 m rifle 3 positions	Bruno Heck	1153- 52x	2nd Q	1245.0	3rd place, bronze medalist(s)
50 m rifle 3 positions	Rocco Rosito	1140- 36x	9th	Did not advance	
50 m rifle prone	Mauro Salles	581-22x	12th	Did not advance	
50 m rifle prone	Bruno Heck	579-31x	15th	Did not advance	
Double Trap	Luiz Fernando Da Graca	132	5th Q	182	3rd place, bronze medalist(s)
Double Trap	Filipe Fuzaro	127	10th	Did not advance	
Trap	Rodrigo Bastos	117	10th	Did not advance	
Trap	Roberto Schmits	120	4th Q	143	3rd place, bronze medalist(s)
Skeet	Jose Pedro Costa	105	28th	Did not advance	
Skeet	Wilson Zocolatte Junior	116	14th	Did not advance	

=== Women ===
Event	Athlete	Qualification		Final	
Event	Athlete	Score	Rank	Score	Rank
10 m air pistol	Rachel Da Silveira	368- 5x	16th	Did not advance	
10 m air pistol	Thais Moura	368- 7x	14th	Did not advance	
10 m air rifle	Roberta De Almeida	388-21x	11th	Did not advance	
10 m air rifle	Cristina De Mello	383-14x	22nd	Did not advance	
25 m pistol	Rachel Da Silveira	561-14x	11th	Did not advance	
25 m pistol	Ana Luiza Mello	570-12x	3rd Q	773.9 FPR	1st place, gold medalist(s)
50 m rifle 3 positions	Roberta De Almeida	559-12x	19th	Did not advance	
50 m rifle 3 positions	Rosane Ewald	550-10x	21st	Did not advance	
Trap	Karla De Bona	65	4th Q	83	5th
Trap	Janice Teixeira	58	9th	Did not advance	

== Squash ==
Brazil has qualified three male and three female athletes in the individual and team competitions.

=== Men ===
Athlete	Event	Round of 32	Round of 16	Quarterfinals	Semifinals	Final
Athlete	Event	Opposition Score	Opposition Score	Opposition Score	Opposition Score	Opposition Score
Rafael Fernandes	Singles		Jaime Pinto (CHI); W 9-11, 11-9, 11-2, 5-11, 11-5	Shawn Delierre (CAN); L 7-11, 11-8, 9-11, 7-11	Did not advance	
Vinicius Rodrigues	Singles	Maximiliano Camiruaga (CHI); W 11-7, 4-11, 11-6, 12-10	César Salazar (MEX); L 6-11, 7-11, 8-11	Did not advance		
Vinicius De Lima; Rafael Fernandes	Doubles		Jaime Pinto (CHI); Maximiliano Camiruaga (CHI); W WO 11 – 0, 11 – 0	Hernán D'Arcangelo (ARG); Roberto Pezzota (ARG); L 11 – 8, 9 – 11, 5 – 11	Did not advance	

Athletes	Event	Preliminaries Group stage			Quarterfinal	Semifinal	Final
Athletes	Event	Opposition Result	Opposition Result	Opposition Result	Opposition Result	Opposition Result	Opposition Result
Vinicius De Lima; Rafael Fernandes; Vinicius Rodrigues	Team	Paraguay; W 3-0, 3-0, 3-0	Peru; W 3-0, 3-0, 3-0	Argentina; W 3-1, 3-1, 3-2	Colombia; W 1-3, 3-1, 3-1	Mexico; L 3-0, 0-3, 0-3 (bronze)	Did not advance

=== Women ===
Athlete	Event	Round of 32	Round of 16	Quarterfinals	Semifinals	Final	
Athlete	Event	Opposition Score	Opposition Score	Opposition Score	Opposition Score	Opposition Score	Opposition Score
Marina Costa	Singles		Miranda Rainieri (CAN); L 8-11, 7-11, 9-11	Did not advance			
Thaisa Serafini	Singles		Lily Lorentzen (USA); W 11-9, 7-11, 11-4, 11-5	Nicolette Fernandes (GUY); L 9-11, 9-11, 9-11	Did not advance		
Mariana Pontalti; Thaisa Serafini	Doubles			Miranda Rainieri (CAN); Stephanie Edminson (CAN); L 5-11, 7-11	Did not advance		

Athletes	Event	Preliminaries Group stage			Quarterfinal	Semifinal	Final
Athletes	Event	Opposition Result	Opposition Result	Opposition Result	Opposition Result	Opposition Result	Opposition Result
Mariana Pontalti; Thaisa Serafini; Marina Costa	Team	United States; L 3-0, 1-3, 0-2	Mexico; L 1-3, 0-3, 1-3	Argentina; W 3-2, 3-2, 3-1	5th-6th place Match: Guatemala; W 3-1, 3-2, 2-0	Did not advance	

== Swimming ==
Brazil has qualified twenty male and twenty-two female athletes in the individual and team competitions.

=== Men ===
Event	Athletes	Heats		Final	
Event	Athletes	Time	Position	Time	Position
50 m Freestyle	César Cielo	22.17	1st Q	21.58 PR	1st place, gold medalist(s)
50 m Freestyle	Bruno Fratus	22.44	3rd	22.05	2nd place, silver medalist(s)
100 m Freestyle	César Cielo	48.89	1st Q	47.84 PR	1st place, gold medalist(s)
100 m Freestyle	Bruno Fratus	50.51	11th	Did not advance	
200 m Freestyle	Andre Schultz	1:50.96	6th Q	1:50.04	7th
200 m Freestyle	Nicolas Oliveira	1:52.65	9th	Did not advance	
400 m Freestyle	Lucas Kanieski	3:58.30	7th Q	3:56.26	5th
400 m Freestyle	Giuliano Rocco	4:04.25	11th	Did not advance	
1500 m Freestyle	Lucas Kanieski	15:39.79	4th Q	15:31.23	5th
1500 m Freestyle	Luiz Arapiraca	16:28.29	13th	Did not advance	
100 m Backstroke	Thiago Pereira	55.50	2nd Q	54.56	1st place, gold medalist(s)
100 m Backstroke	Guilherme Guido	55.71	4th Q	54.81	3rd place, bronze medalist(s)
200 m Backstroke	Thiago Pereira	2:03.53	2nd Q	1:57.19 RP	1st place, gold medalist(s)
200 m Backstroke	Leonardo de Deus	2:05.12	5th Q	2:03.28	5th
100 m Breaststroke	Felipe França	1:00.71	1st Q	1:00.34	1st place, gold medalist(s)
100 m Breaststroke	Felipe Lima	1:02.24	4th Q	1:00.99	2nd place, silver medalist(s)
200 m Breaststroke	Thiago Pereira	2:17.15	4th Q	2:13.58	3rd place, bronze medalist(s)
200 m Breaststroke	Tales Cerdeira	2:20.30	7th Q	2:17.84	5th
100 m Butterfly	Gabriel Mangabeira	52.95	1st Q	53.24	6th
100 m Butterfly	Kaio Almeida	53.88	7th Q	53.62	8th
200 m Butterfly	Kaio Almeida	2:00.32	2nd Q	1:57.92	1st place, gold medalist(s)
200 m Butterfly	Leonardo de Deus	2:00.99	3rd Q	1:58.78	3rd place, bronze medalist(s)
200 m Individual Medley	Thiago Pereira	2:04.84	2nd Q	1:58.07	1st place, gold medalist(s)
200 m Individual Medley	Henrique Rodrigues	2:04.88	3rd Q	2:03.41	3rd place, bronze medalist(s)
400 m Individual Medley	Thiago Pereira	4:26.27	2nd Q	4:16.68	1st place, gold medalist(s)
400 m Individual Medley	Diogo Yabe	4:34.18	7th Q	4:35.66	7th
4 × 100 m Freestyle Relay	Bruno Fratus; César Cielo; Nicolas Oliveira; Nicholas Santos; Gabriel Mangabeira^{*} Henrique Rodrigues^{*} Thiago Pereira^{*}	3:23.64	2nd Q	3:14.65 PR	1st place, gold medalist(s)
4 × 200 m Freestyle Relay	André Schultz; Leonardo de Deus; Nicolas Oliveira; Thiago Pereira; Giuliano Rocco^{*} Lucas Kanieski^{*} Diogo Yabe^{*}	7:37.89	2nd Q	7:21.96	2nd place, silver medalist(s)
4 × 100 m Medley Relay	Gabriel Mangabeira; César Cielo; Felipe França; Guilherme Guido; Gabriel Mangabeira^{*} Bruno Fratus^{*} Thiago Pereira^{*} Felipe Lima^{*}	3:47.28	2nd Q	3:34.58	1st place, gold medalist(s)
10 km marathon	Allan do Carmo			1:58:37.3	7th
10 km marathon	Samuel de Bona			2:08:28.4	12th

=== Women ===
Event	Athletes	Heats		Final	
Event	Athletes	Time	Position	Time	Position
50 m Freestyle	Graciele Herrmann	25.28	1st Q	25.23	2nd place, silver medalist(s)
50 m Freestyle	Flávia Delaroli	25.77	6th Q	25.94	6th
100 m Freestyle	Tatiana Barbosa	56.47	5th Q	56.36	7th
100 m Freestyle	Daynara de Paula	57.14	9th	Did not advance	
200 m Freestyle	Jessica Cavalheiro	2:04.79	6th Q	2:04.13	6th
200 m Freestyle	Tatiana Barbosa	2:05.86	8th Q	2:04.20	7th
400 m Freestyle	Joanna Maranhão	4:18.85	6th Q	4:13.71	4th
400 m Freestyle	Manuella Lyrio	4:22.97	10th	Did not advance	
800 m Freestyle	Gabriela Rocha	9:13.64	12th	Did not advance	
800 m Freestyle	Sarah Correa	9:27.34	15th	Did not advance	
100 m Backstroke	Fabíola Molina	1:02.81	4th Q	1:02.04	4th
100 m Backstroke	Etiene Medeiros	1:04.59	10th	Did not advance	
200 m Backstroke	Fernanda Alvarenga	2:21.24	8th Q	2:22.77	8th
200 m Backstroke	Joanna Maranhão	DNS		Did not advance	
100 m Breaststroke	Tatiane Sakemi	1:12.06	6th Q	1:11.46	6th
100 m Breaststroke	Carolina Mussi	1:13.75	14th	Did not advance	
200 m Breaststroke	Michele Schmidt	2:39.63	10th	Did not advance	
200 m Breaststroke	Thamy Ventorini	2:39.63	11th	Did not advance	
100 m Butterfly	Daynara de Paula	1:00.25	3rd Q	59.30	2nd place, silver medalist(s)
100 m Butterfly	Gabriella Silva	1:02.86	10th	Did not advance	
200 m Butterfly	Joanna Maranhão	2:14.63	4th Q	59.30	2nd place, silver medalist(s)
200 m Butterfly	Daiene Dias	2:19.07	10th	Did not advance	
200 m Individual Medley	Joanna Maranhão	2:19.71	3rd Q	2:13.00	4th
200 m Individual Medley	Larissa Cieslak	2:25.57	11th	Did not advance	
400 m Individual Medley	Joanna Maranhão	4:54.51	3rd Q	4:46.33	2nd place, silver medalist(s)
400 m Individual Medley	Larissa Cieslak	5:09.81	12th	Did not advance	
4 × 100 m Freestyle Relay	Daynara de Paula; Michelle Lenhardt; Flávia Delaroli; Tatiana Barbosa; Graciele Herrmann^{*}	3:48.12	2nd Q	3:44.62	2nd place, silver medalist(s)
4 × 200 m Freestyle Relay	Joanna Maranhão; Jessica Cavalheiro; Manuella Lyrio; Tatiana Barbosa; Sarah Correa^{*} Gabriela Rocha^{*} Larissa Cieslak^{*} Thamy Ventorini^{*}	8:46.95	5th Q	8:09.89	2nd place, silver medalist(s)
4 × 100 m Medley Relay	Fabíola Molina; Tatiane Sakemi; Daynara de Paula; Tatiana Barbosa	4:15.53	2nd Q	4:07.12	3rd place, bronze medalist(s)
10 km Marathon	Poliana Okimoto			2:05:51.3	2nd place, silver medalist(s)
10 km Marathon	Ana Marcela Cunha			2:05:55.2	5th

^{*} Swimmers who participated in the heats only and received medals.

== Synchronized swimming ==
Brazil has qualified a team and a duet to participate.

Athlete	Event	Technical Routine		Free Routine (Final)			
Athlete	Event	Points	Rank	Points	Rank	Total points	Rank
Lara Teixeira; Nayara Figueira	Women's duet	88.500	3rd	88.913	3rd	177.413	3rd place, bronze medalist(s)
Giovana Stephan; Joseane Acosta; Lara Teixeira; Lorena Molinos |Maria Bruno; Maria Eduarda Pereira; Nayara Figueira; Pamela Nogueira	Women's team	87.625	3rd	88.800	4th'	176.425	3rd place, bronze medalist(s)

== Table tennis ==
Brazil has qualified three male and three female athletes to compete in the individual and team competitions.

=== Men ===
Athlete	Event	Round robin			Round of 32	Round of 16	Quarterfinals	Semifinals	Final
Athlete	Event	Match 1	Match 2	Match 3	Round of 32	Round of 16	Quarterfinals	Semifinals	Final
Athlete	Event	Opposition Result	Opposition Result	Opposition Result	Opposition Result	Opposition Result	Opposition Result	Opposition Result	Opposition Result
Hugo Hoyama	Singles	Josue Donado (ESA); W 4 – 0	Pierre-Luc Hinse (CAN); W 4 – 1	Heber Moscoso (GUA); W 4 – 0		Andy Pereyra (CUB); L 2 – 4	Did not advance		
Thiago Monteiro	Singles	Felipe Olivares (CHI); W 4 – 2	Jonathan Pino (VEN); W 4 – 3	Saul Bonilla (ESA); W 4 – 0		Marcos Navas (VEN); W 4 – 1	Marcos Madrid (MEX); L 1 – 4	Did not advance	
Gustavo Tsuboi	Singles	Alexander Echavarria (COL); W 4 – 1	Henry Mujica (VEN); W 4 – 1	Dino Suarez (ECU); W 4 – 0		Jorge Campos (CUB); L 3 – 4	Did not advance		
Hugo Hoyama; Thiago Monteiro; Gustavo Tsuboi	Team	Ecuador; W 3 – 0, 3 – 1, 3 – 0	Dominican Republic; W 3 – 2, 3 – 0, 3 – 2				United States; W 3 – 0, 3 – 0, 3 – 1	Cuba; W 1 – 3, 3 – 0, 2 – 3,3 – 2, 3 – 1	Argentina; W 3 – 0, 3 – 1, 1 – 3,3 – 1 (gold)

=== Women ===
Athlete	Event	Round robin			Round of 32	Round of 16	Quarterfinals	Semifinals	Final
Athlete	Event	Match 1	Match 2	Match 3	Round of 32	Round of 16	Quarterfinals	Semifinals	Final
Athlete	Event	Opposition Result	Opposition Result	Opposition Result	Opposition Result	Opposition Result	Opposition Result	Opposition Result	Opposition Result
Caroline Kumahara	Singles	Shirley Fu (CAN); W 4 – 1	Yadira Silva (MEX); L 2 – 4	Daniely Ríos (PUR); W 4 – 2	Glendy González (CUB); W 4 – 1	Xue Wu (DOM); L 1 – 4	Did not advance		
Lígia Silva	Singles	Luisa Zuluaga (COL); W 4 – 0	Anqi Luo (CAN); L 3 – 4	Mabelyn Enriquez (GUA); W 4 – 0		Johana Araque (COL); W 4 – 0	Ariel Hsing (USA); L 3 – 4	Did not advance	
Jessica Yamada	Singles	Wang De Ying (ESA); W 4 – 2	Carelyn Cordero (PUR); W 4 – 1	Johenny Valdez (DOM); L 3 – 4	Francesca Vargas (PER); W 4 – 1	Ariel Hsing (USA); L 3 – 4	Did not advance		
Caroline Kumahara; Lígia Silva; Jessica Yamada	Team	Mexico; W 2 – 3, 3 – 0, 3 – 1, 3 – 2	Cuba; W 3 – 0, 1 – 3, 1 – 3, 3 – 0, 3 – 0				Colombia; L 0 – 3, 3 – 2, 2 – 3, 2 – 3	Did not advance	

== Taekwondo ==
Brazil has qualified three male athletes in the 58 kg, 68 kg, and 80 kg categories and three female athletes in the 49 kg, 67 kg

=== Men ===
Athlete	Event	Round of 16	Quarterfinals	Semifinals	Final
Athlete	Event	Opposition Result	Opposition Result	Opposition Result	Opposition Result
Marcio Ferreira	Flyweight (-58kg)		Mayko Votta (URU); W 7 – 2	Damian Alejandro Villa (MEX); L 10 – 17 (bronze)	Did not advance
Diogo Silva	Lightweight (-68kg)	Nicholos Dusard (JAM); W 8 – 5	Terrence De'Andre Jennings (USA); L 4 – 6	Did not advance	
Douglas Marcelino	Middleweight (-80kg)	Timothy James Curry (USA); L 5 – 8	Did not advance		

=== Women ===
Athlete	Event	Round of 16	Quarterfinals	Semifinals	Final
Athlete	Event	Opposition Result	Opposition Result	Opposition Result	Opposition Result
Katia Arakaki	Flyweight (-49kg)	Yajaira Peguero (DOM); W 7 – 6	Deirane Estephany Morales (USA); L 3 – 10	Did not advance	
Raphaella Pereira	Middleweight (-67kg)	Adanys Cordero (VEN); W 2 – 1	Melissa Pagnota (CAN); L 4 – 5	Did not advance	
Natalia Silva	Heavyweight(+67kg)	Lauren Cahoon Hamon (USA); L 1 – 1 SUP	Did not advance		

== Tennis ==
=== Men ===
Athlete	Event	1st Round	Round of 32	Round of 16	Quarterfinals	Semifinals	Final
Athlete	Event	Opposition Score	Opposition Score	Opposition Score	Opposition Score	Opposition Score	Opposition Score
Ricardo Mello	Singles		Iván Endara (ECU); W 6 – 4, 6 – 0	Nicolás Massú (CHI); W 1 – 6, 6 – 2, 6 – 3	Víctor Estrella (DOM); L 3 – 6, 2 – 6	Did not advance	
Rogério Dutra	Singles		Alexander Llompart (PUR); W 6 – 1, 6 – 2	Greg Ouellette (USA); W 6 – 4, 7 – 5	Juan Sebastián Cabal (COL); W 7 – 6(11), 6 – 3	Julio César Campozano (ECU); W 6 – 4, 6(5) – 7, 7 – 5	Robert Farah (COL); L 4 – 6, 3 – 6 (silver)
João Souza	Singles		Robert Farah (COL); L 4 – 6, 3 – 6	Did not advance			
João Souza; Ricardo Mello	Doubles		Ricardo De Mello (COL); Robert Farah (COL); L 6(1) – 7, 3 – 6	Did not advance			

=== Women ===
Athlete	Event	Round of 32	Round of 16	Quarterfinals	Semifinals	Final
Athlete	Event	Opposition Score	Opposition Score	Opposition Score	Opposition Score	Opposition Score
Ana Clara Duarte	Singles		Monica Puig (PUR); L 1 – 6, 4 – 6	Did not advance		
Teliana Pereira	Singles		Bianca Botto (PER); L 1 – 6, 2 – 6	Did not advance		
Vivian Segnini	Singles		Ximena Hermoso (MEX); L 4 – 6, 2 – 6	Did not advance		
Vivian Segnini; Teliana Pereira	Doubles		Daniela Seguel (CHI); Camila Silva (CHI); W 6 – 1, 6 – 4	Irina Falconi (USA); Christine McHale (USA); L 2 – 6, 6 – 2, (6 – 10)	Did not advance	

=== Mixed doubles ===
Athlete	Event	Round of 16	Quarterfinals	Semifinals	Final
Athlete	Event	Opposition Score	Opposition Score	Opposition Score	Opposition Score
Ana Clara Duarte; Rogério Dutra	Doubles		Bianca Botto (PER); Duilio Beretta (CHI); W 6 – 3, 6 – 4	Ana Paula de la Peña (MEX); Santiago González (MEX); L 5 – 7, 3 – 6	Bronze medal Match: Adriana Pérez (VEN); Román Recarte (VEN); W 7 – 6(4), 5 – 7, [11 – 9] (bronze)

== Triathlon ==
Brazil has qualified a full triathlon team.

=== Men ===
Athlete	Event	Swim (1.5 km)	Trans 1	Bike (40 km)	Trans 2	Run (10 km)	Total	Rank
Diogo Sclebin	Individual	18:23; 11th	0:25; 17th	57:15; 15th	0:16; 18th	33:27; 6th	1:49:49	5th
Bruno Matheus	Individual	18:18; 7th	0:22; 1st	58:47; 26th	0:13; 2nd	34:26; 9th	1:52:08	14th
Reinaldo Colucci	Individual	18:13; 3rd	0:24; 5th	57:25; 22nd	0:14; 4th	31:44; 1st	1:48:02	1st place, gold medalist(s)

=== Women ===
Athlete	Event	Swim (1.5 km)	Trans 1	Bike (40 km)	Trans 2	Run (10 km)	Total	Rank
Pâmella Oliveira	Individual	18:56; 3rd	0:27; 11th	1:01:01; 1st	0:15; 5th	39:52; 10th	2:00:32	3rd place, bronze medalist(s)
Flavia Fernandes	Individual	20:06; 5th	0:26; 10th	1:03:46; 16th	0:14; 1st	40:53; 12th	2:05:27	12th

== Volleyball ==
Brazil has qualified a men's and women's team to the volleyball competition.

=== Men ===
Squad

- Thiago Alves
- Mauricio Borges
- Eder Carbonera
- Mario Da Silva
- Mauricio De Souza
- Wallace De Souza
- Gustavo Endres
- Luiz Fonteles
- Wallace Martins
- Murilo Radke
- Bruno Rezende
- Renato Russomanno

Pos	Team	Pld	W	L	Pts	SPW	SPL	SPR	SW	SL	SR	Qualification
1	Brazil	3	3	0	14	243	171	1.421	9	1	9.000	Semifinals
2	Puerto Rico	3	1	2	7	227	244	0.930	5	6	0.833	Quarterfinals
3	United States	3	1	2	6	313	324	0.966	6	8	0.750	Quarterfinals
4	Canada	3	1	2	3	238	282	0.844	3	8	0.375	

Date		Score		Set 1	Set 2	Set 3	Set 4	Set 5	Total	Report
Oct 24	Brazil	3–0	Canada	25–17	25–13	25–13			75–43	Report
Oct 25	Brazil	3–0	Puerto Rico	25–22	25–14	25–18			75–54	Report
Oct 26	Brazil	3–1	United States	18-25	25-17	25-14	25-18		93-74	Report

=== Semifinals ===
Date		Score		Set 1	Set 2	Set 3	Set 4	Set 5	Total	Report
Oct 28	Brazil	3–1	Argentina	26-28	27-25	25-22	25-15		103-90	Report

=== Gold medal match ===
Date		Score		Set 1	Set 2	Set 3	Set 4	Set 5	Total	Report
Oct 29	Brazil	3–1	Cuba	25-11	24-26	25-18	25-19		99-74	Report

2011 Pan American Games Gold medal

Brazil

=== Women ===
Squad

Fabiana Claudino Juciely Silva Dani Lins Paula Pequeno Thaísa Menezes Marianne Steinbrecher Jaqueline Carvalho Tandara Caixeta Sheilla Castro Fabiana de Oliveira Fernanda Garay Fabíola de Souza

Pos	Team	Pld	W	L	Pts	SPW	SPL	SPR	SW	SL	SR	Qualification
1	Brazil	3	3	0	13	267	212	1.259	9	2	4.500	Semifinals
2	Cuba	3	2	1	10	259	236	1.097	7	4	1.750	Quarterfinals
3	Dominican Republic	3	1	2	5	283	304	0.931	5	8	0.625	Quarterfinals
4	Canada	3	0	3	2	209	266	0.786	2	9	0.222	

Date		Score		Set 1	Set 2	Set 3	Set 4	Set 5	Total	Report
Oct 15	Brazil	3–1	Dominican Republic	25–22	21–25	25–16	25–20		96–83	Report
Oct 16	Brazil	3–0	Canada	25–19	25–12	25–10			75–41	Report
Oct 17	Brazil	3–1	Cuba	25–23	21–25	25–22	25–18		96–88	Report

=== Semifinals ===
Date		Score		Set 1	Set 2	Set 3	Set 4	Set 5	Total	Report
Oct 19	Brazil	3–0	Dominican Republic	25–19	25–18	25–23			75–60	Report

=== Gold medal match ===
Date		Score		Set 1	Set 2	Set 3	Set 4	Set 5	Total	Report
Oct 20	Cuba	2–3	Brazil	15–25	25–21	21–25	25–21	10–15	96–107	

2011 Pan American Games Gold medal

Brazil

== Water polo ==
Brazil has qualified the men's and women's teams to the water polo competition.

=== Men ===
Team

- Henrique Carvalho
- João Coelho
- Danilo Correa
- Jonas Crivella
- Marcelo Das Chagas
- Felipe De Costa
- Luís Dos Santos
- Marcelo Franco
- Ruda Franco
- Gustavo Guimăres
- Bernardo Rocha
- Gabriel Rocha
- Emilio Vieira

The men's team will compete in Group B.

Team	GP	W	D	L	GF	GA	GD	Pts
United States	3	3	0	0	37	15	+22	6
Brazil	3	2	0	1	34	26	+8	4
Argentina	3	1	0	2	23	30	-7	2
Venezuela	3	0	0	3	20	43	-23	0

October 23, 2011; 15:45	Report	Argentina	8–10	Brazil	Scotiabank Aquatics Center, Guadalajara; Referees: Menendez (CUB), Stampalija (CRO)
October 23, 2011; 15:45	Report	Score by quarters: 2 – 3, 1 – 1, 3 – 3, 2 – 2			Scotiabank Aquatics Center, Guadalajara; Referees: Menendez (CUB), Stampalija (CRO)
October 23, 2011; 15:45	Report	Echenique 3	Goals	4 players 2	Scotiabank Aquatics Center, Guadalajara; Referees: Menendez (CUB), Stampalija (CRO)

October 24, 2011; 14:30	Report	United States	8–5	Brazil	Scotiabank Aquatics Center, Guadalajara; Referees: Menendez (CUB), Bohm (AHO)
October 24, 2011; 14:30	Report	Score by quarters: 2 – 0, 2 – 2, 1 – 2, 3 – 1			Scotiabank Aquatics Center, Guadalajara; Referees: Menendez (CUB), Bohm (AHO)
October 24, 2011; 14:30	Report	Bailey, Hutten 3	Goals	5 players, 1	Scotiabank Aquatics Center, Guadalajara; Referees: Menendez (CUB), Bohm (AHO)

October 25, 2011; 17:00	Report	Venezuela	10–19	Brazil	Scotiabank Aquatics Center, Guadalajara; Referees: Stampalija (CRO), Callejas (MEX)
October 25, 2011; 17:00	Report	Score by quarters: 1 – 2, 4 – 5, 5 – 6, 0 – 6			Scotiabank Aquatics Center, Guadalajara; Referees: Stampalija (CRO), Callejas (MEX)
October 25, 2011; 17:00	Report	3 players, 2	Goals	Emilio Vieira 4	Scotiabank Aquatics Center, Guadalajara; Referees: Stampalija (CRO), Callejas (MEX)

=== Semifinals ===
October 27, 2011; 17:00	Report	Brazil	6–8	Canada	Scotiabank Aquatics Center, Guadalajara
October 27, 2011; 17:00	Report	Score by quarters: 4 – 1, 0 – 1, 1 – 3, 1 – 3			Scotiabank Aquatics Center, Guadalajara
October 27, 2011; 17:00	Report	Crivella 2	Goals	Graham 3	Scotiabank Aquatics Center, Guadalajara

=== Bronze medal match ===
October 29, 2011; 15:30	Report	Brazil	14–7	Cuba	Scotiabank Aquatics Center, Guadalajara; Referees: Bohm (AHO), Valcarce (ARG)
October 29, 2011; 15:30	Report	Score by quarters: 4 – 4, 3 – 0, 2 – 3, 5 – 0			Scotiabank Aquatics Center, Guadalajara; Referees: Bohm (AHO), Valcarce (ARG)
October 29, 2011; 15:30	Report	Rocha 3	Goals	Rivas 4	Scotiabank Aquatics Center, Guadalajara; Referees: Bohm (AHO), Valcarce (ARG)

2011 Pan American Games Bronze medal

Brazil

=== Women ===
Team

- Tess De Oliveira
- Cecilia Canetti
- Marina Zablith
- Marina Canetti
- Catherine De Oliveira
- Izabella Chiappini
- Cristina Beer
- Luiza Carvalho
- Fernanda Lissoni
- Gabriela Gozani
- Mirela Coutinho
- Gabriela Dias
- Manuela Canetti

The women's team will compete in Group A.

Team	GP	W	D	L	GF	GA	GD	Pts
Canada	3	3	0	0	54	15	+39	6
Brazil	3	2	0	1	22	21	+1	4
Mexico	3	1	0	2	31	33	-2	2
Venezuela	3	0	0	3	12	50	-38	0

October 23, 2011; 11:00	Report	Brazil	8–5	Mexico	Scotiabank Aquatics Center, Guadalajara; Referees: Redding (USA), Bohm (AHO)
October 23, 2011; 11:00	Report	Score by quarters: 2 – 2, 3– 2, 2 – 0, 1 – 1			Scotiabank Aquatics Center, Guadalajara; Referees: Redding (USA), Bohm (AHO)
October 23, 2011; 11:00	Report	Oliveira, Beer 2	Goals	Orozco 4	Scotiabank Aquatics Center, Guadalajara; Referees: Redding (USA), Bohm (AHO)

October 24, 2011; 9:45	Report	Brazil	4–13	Canada	Scotiabank Aquatics Center, Guadalajara; Referees: Madera (CUB) Arnoldo (VEN)
October 24, 2011; 9:45	Report	Score by quarters: 0 – 2, 1 – 3, 0 – 5, 3 – 3			Scotiabank Aquatics Center, Guadalajara; Referees: Madera (CUB) Arnoldo (VEN)
October 24, 2011; 9:45	Report	4 players, 1	Goals	3 players, 2	Scotiabank Aquatics Center, Guadalajara; Referees: Madera (CUB) Arnoldo (VEN)

October 25, 2011; 9:45	Report	Brazil	10–3	Venezuela	Scotiabank Aquatics Center, Guadalajara; Referees: Bohm (AHO), Menendez (CUB)
October 25, 2011; 9:45	Report	Score by quarters: 4 – 0, 2 – 2, 2 – 0, 2 – 1			Scotiabank Aquatics Center, Guadalajara; Referees: Bohm (AHO), Menendez (CUB)
October 25, 2011; 9:45	Report	Oliveira, Beer 2	Goals	Alas 2	Scotiabank Aquatics Center, Guadalajara; Referees: Bohm (AHO), Menendez (CUB)

=== Semifinals ===
October 26, 2011; 15:30	Report	Brazil	1–13	United States	Scotiabank Aquatics Center, Guadalajara; Referees: Parades (VEN), Stampalija (CRO)
October 26, 2011; 15:30	Report	Score by quarters: 0 – 3, 0 – 1, 0 – 3, 1 – 6			Scotiabank Aquatics Center, Guadalajara; Referees: Parades (VEN), Stampalija (CRO)
October 26, 2011; 15:30	Report	Canetti 1	Goals	Mathewson 5	Scotiabank Aquatics Center, Guadalajara; Referees: Parades (VEN), Stampalija (CRO)

=== Bronze medal match ===
October 28, 2011; 15:30	Report	Brazil	9–8	Cuba	Scotiabank Aquatics Center, Guadalajara; Referees: Bohm (AHO), Moller (ARG)
October 28, 2011; 15:30	Report	Score by quarters: 2 – 1, 1 – 2, 4 – 3, 2 – 2			Scotiabank Aquatics Center, Guadalajara; Referees: Bohm (AHO), Moller (ARG)
October 28, 2011; 15:30	Report	Canetti, Oliveira 3	Goals	Gutierrez 3	Scotiabank Aquatics Center, Guadalajara; Referees: Bohm (AHO), Moller (ARG)

2011 Pan American Games Bronze medal

Brazil

== Water skiing ==
Brazil has qualified a full team in the water skiing competition.

=== Men ===
Event	Athlete	Semifinal		Final	
Event	Athlete	Points	Rank	Points	Rank
Slalom	Felipe Neves	34.50	6th Q	33.50	6th
Slalom	Fernando Neves	32.50	11th	Did not advance	
Wakeboard	Marcelo Giardi	75.66	2nd q	65.90	2nd place, silver medalist(s)

=== Women ===
Athlete	Event	Semifinal		Final	
Athlete	Event	Points	Rank	Points	Rank
Tricks	Juliana Negrao	1970	9th	Did not advance	
Slalom	Lorena Botana	21.50	6th q	25.00	5th

== Weightlifting ==
Brazil has qualified two male and two female weightlifters.

Athlete	Event	Snatch			Clean & jerk			Total	Rank
Athlete	Event	Attempt 1	Attempt 2	Attempt 3	Attempt 1	Attempt 2	Attempt 3	Total	Rank
Welisson Da Silva	Men's 77 kg	140	145	148	172	177	~~180~~	325	4th
Fernando Reis	Men's +105 kg	176	181	185 RP	211	216	225 RP	410 RP	1st place, gold medalist(s)
Liliane Menezes	Women's 69 kg	90	~~94~~	~~95~~	110	~~114~~	~~114~~	200	6th
Jacqueline Ferreira	Women's 75 kg	~~97~~	~~101~~	~~101~~	Did not finish				

== Wrestling ==
Brazil has qualified two wrestlers in the 84 kg and 120 kg men's freestyle categories, three wrestlers in the 55 kg, 60 kg, and 84 kg men's Greco-Roman categories, and two wrestlers in the 55 kg and 72 kg women's freestyle categories.

=== Men ===
Freestyle

Athlete	Event	Quarterfinals	Semifinals	Final
Athlete	Event	Opposition Result	Opposition Result	Opposition Result
Adrian Jaoude	84 kg	Roberto Carlos Espinosa (PAN); W VT 5 – 0	Humberto Daniel Arencibia (CUB); L PO 0 – 3	Bronze medal match: Jeffrey Adamson (CAN); L ST 0 – 4
Antoine Jaoude	120 kg	Carlos jose Feliz Garcia (CUB); L PO 0 – 3	Did not advance	

Greco-Roman

Athlete	Event	Quarterfinals	Semifinals	Final
Athlete	Event	Opposition Result	Opposition Result	Opposition Result
Rafael Pascoa	55 kg	Juan Carlos Lopez (COL); L PO 0 – 3	Did not advance	
Diego Romanelli	60 kg	Hanser Lenier Meoque (CUB); L PO 0 – 3	Did not advance	
Marcelo Gomes	84 kg	Cristian Ferney Mosquera (COL); L PO 0 – 3		Bronze medal match: Yorgen Cova (VEN); L PO 0 – 3

=== Women ===
Freestyle

Athlete	Event	Round of 16	Quarterfinals	Semifinals	Final
Athlete	Event	Opposition Result	Opposition Result	Opposition Result	Opposition Result
Joice Silva	55 kg		Helen Louis Maroulis (USA); L VT 0 – 5		Bronze medal match: Marcia Andrades (VEN); W PO 3 – 0 (bronze)
Aline Ferreira	55 kg		Ashley Zarate (PAN); W VT 5 – 0	Elsa Sánchez (DOM); W VT' 5 – 0	Lisset Hechevarria (CUB); L PP 1 – 3 (silver)
