= Athletics at the 2011 Pan American Games – Women's 10,000 metres =

Women's 10,000 metres at the 2011 Pan American Games
- Venue: Telmex Athletics Stadium
- Dates: October 24
- Competitors: 8 from 6 nations

Medalists
Gold medal	Marisol Romero	Mexico
Silver medal	Cruz da Silva	Brazil
Bronze medal	Yolanda Caballero	Colombia

The women's 10,000 metres competition of the athletics events at the 2011 Pan American Games took place on the 24 of October at the Telmex Athletics Stadium. The defending Pan American Games champion is Sara Slattery of the United States.

== Records ==
Prior to this competition, the existing world and Pan American Games records were as follows:

World record	Junxia Wang (CHN)	29:31.78	Beijing, China	September 8, 1993
Pan American Games record	Sara Slattery (USA)	32:54.41	Rio de Janeiro, Brazil	July 23, 2007

== Qualification ==
Each National Olympic Committee (NOC) was able to enter up to two entrants providing they had met the minimum standard (35.30.00) in the qualifying period (January 1, 2010 to September 14, 2011).

== Schedule ==
Date	Time	Round
October 25, 2011	16:45	Final

== Abbreviations ==
- All times shown are in minutes:seconds

PR	Pan American games record
WR	world record
NR	national record
PB	personal best
SB	season best

== Results ==
8 athletes from 6 countries competed.

=== Final ===
Rank	Name	Nationality	Time	Notes
1st place, gold medalist(s)	Marisol Romero	Mexico	34:07:24	
2nd place, silver medalist(s)	Cruz da Silva	Brazil	34:22:44	
3rd place, bronze medalist(s)	Yolanda Caballero	Colombia	34:39:14	
4	Annie Bersagel	United States	35:23:31	
5	Yudileyvis Castillo	Cuba	35:35:43	
6	Julia Rivera	Peru	35:46:21	
7	Cassie Ficken Slade	United States	36:14:96	
8	Hortencia Arzapalo	Peru	37:10:63	
