= Swimming at the 2011 Pan American Games – Women's 200 metre breaststroke =

Women's 200 metre breaststroke at the 2011 Pan American Games
- Venue: Scotiabank Aquatics Center
- Dates: October 20 (preliminaries and finals)
- Competitors: 15 from 10 nations

Medalists
Gold medal	Ashley McGregor	Canada
Silver medal	Haley Spencer	United States
Bronze medal	Michelle McKeehan	United States

The women's 200 metre breaststroke competition of the swimming events at the 2011 Pan American Games took place on October 20 at the Scotiabank Aquatics Center in the municipality of Zapopan, near Guadalajara, Mexico. The defending Pan American Games champion was Caitlin Leverenz of the United States.

This race consisted of four lengths of the pool all in breaststroke.

== Records ==
Prior to this competition, the existing world and Pan American Games records were as follows:

World record	Annamay Pierse (CAN)	2:20.12	Rome, Italy	July 30, 2009
Pan American Games record	Caitlin Leverenz (USA)	2:25.62	Rio de Janeiro, Brazil	July 22, 2007

== Qualification ==
Each National Olympic Committee (NOC) was able to enter up to two entrants providing they had met the A standard (2:37.6) in the qualifying period (January 1, 2010 to September 4, 2011). NOCs were also permitted to enter one athlete providing they had met the B standard (2:41.3) in the same qualifying period.

== Results ==
All times are in minutes and seconds.

KEY:	q	Fastest non-qualifiers	Q	Qualified	GR	Games record	NR	National record	PB	Personal best	SB	Seasonal best

=== Heats ===
The first round was held on October 20.

Rank	Heat	Lane	Name	Nationality	Time	Notes
1	2	5	Ashley McGregor	Canada	2:29.32	QA
2	2	4	Haley Spencer	United States	2:29.51	QA
3	2	3	Hanna Pierse	Canada	2:31.73	QA
4	1	5	Alia Atkinson	Jamaica	2:32.33	QA
5	1	4	Michelle McKeehan	United States	2:32.68	QA
6	2	2	Julia Sebastian	Argentina	2:35.12	QA
7	2	7	Melissa Rodríguez	Mexico	2:35.43	QA
8	1	6	Mijal Asis	Argentina	2:35.85	QA
9	1	3	Arantxa Medina	Mexico	2:39.15	QB
10	1	2	Michele Schmidt	Brazil	2:39.63	QB
11	2	6	Thamy Ventorini	Brazil	2:41.52	QB
12	1	1	Daniela Victoria	Venezuela	2:42.02	QB
13	2	8	Lisa Blackburn	Bermuda	2:45.36	QB
14	2	1	Patricia Casellas	Puerto Rico	2:48.83	QB
	1	7	Mckayla Lightbourn	Bahamas		DNS

=== B Final ===
The B final was also held on October 20.

Rank	Lane	Name	Nationality	Time	Notes
9	6	Daniela Victoria	Venezuela	2:38.52	
10	4	Arantxa Medina	Mexico	2:39.17	
11	5	Michele Schmidt	Brazil	2:39.22	
12	3	Thamy Ventorini	Brazil	2:41.86	
13	2	Lisa Blackburn	Bermuda	2:44.86	
14	7	Patricia Casellas	Puerto Rico	2:47.15	

=== A Final ===
The A final was also held on October 20.

Rank	Lane	Name	Nationality	Time	Notes
1st place, gold medalist(s)	4	Ashley McGregor	Canada	2:28.04	
2nd place, silver medalist(s)	5	Haley Spencer	United States	2:29.30	
3rd place, bronze medalist(s)	2	Michelle McKeehan	United States	2:30.51	
4	6	Alia Atkinson	Jamaica	2:30.96	
5	3	Hanna Pierse	Canada	2:31.06	
6	7	Julia Sebastian	Argentina	2:32.74	
7	1	Melissa Rodríguez	Mexico	2:35.15	
8	8	Mijal Asis	Argentina	2:35.21	
