= Gabriela Rocha =

Gabriela Rocha may refer to:

- Gabriela Rocha (singer) (born 1994), Brazilian Christian singer and songwriter
- Gabriela Rocha (swimmer) (born 1995), Brazilian swimmer
