= Yolanda Caballero =

Colombian long-distance runner (born 1982)

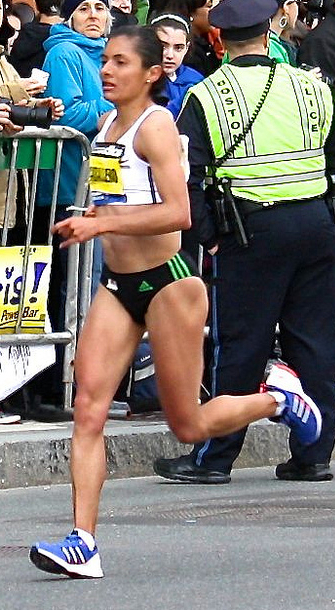
- Yolanda Caballero at Boston Marathon 2013

Personal information
- Born: March 9, 1982 (age 44) Bogotá, Colombia
- Height: 1.55 m (5 ft 1 in)
- Weight: 46 kg (101 lb)

Sport
- Country: Colombia
- Sport: Women's athletics
Medal record
Women's athletics
Representing Colombia
Pan American Games
Bronze medal – third place	2011 Guadalajara	10,000 m
Central American and Caribbean Games
Gold medal – first place	2010 Mayagüez	10,000 m
Bolivarian Games
Bronze medal – third place	2005 Armenia	3000 m steeplechase
South American Championships
Bronze medal – third place	2005 Cali	3000 m steeplechase

Yolanda Beatriz Caballero Pérez (born March 9, 1982) is a long-distance runner from Colombia. Her personal best of 2:26:17 hours for the marathon (set at the Boston Marathon) is the fastest by a South American runner. Her half marathon best of 1:10:30 hours is also a South American record.

She started out as a steeplechase runner, taking bronze at the 2005 South American Championships, but progressed to long-distance races. She was the 2010 Central American and Caribbean Games champion in the 10,000 metres, and was the bronze medallist in that event at the 2011 Pan American Games. She represented Colombia in the marathon at the 2012 Summer Olympics.

== Career ==
Based in Bogotá, she is affiliated with the Atletas con Porvenir running club. Her international career began in 2001: she was ninth in the junior race at the South American Cross Country Championships and competed at both the Pan American Junior and South American Junior Championships. At the Pan American event she was third in the 1500 metres and at the South American competition she was the runner-up in the 3000 metres steeplechase and bronze medallist over 5000 metres. She moved up in age category at the 2004 South American Under-23 Championships in Athletics and took third over 1500 m and broke the Colombian national record in the steeplechase with a time of 10:24.09 minutes for second place. She traveled to Europe to compete at the 2004 Ibero-American Championships in Athletics and ran a personal best of 9:36.86 minutes for the 3000 metres.

Caballero's first senior medal came at the 2005 South American Championships in Athletics held in Cali, where she was the bronze medallist in the steeplechase. She repeated that feat at the 2005 Bolivarian Games. She never participated in international competition from 2006 to 2009 and re-emerged in 2010, focusing on longer distance races. She won a 5000 m and 10,000 metres double at the Colombian Championships in 2010. She won the 5000 m bronze at the 2010 Ibero-American Championships in Athletics with a personal best run of 15:50.18 minutes. As national champion, she represented Colombia over the long-distance track events at the 2010 Central American and Caribbean Games. She became the CAC Games champion in the 10,000 m and was elevated to the silver medal in the 5000 m after the disqualification of Rachael Marchand. She began competing in road running events towards the end of the year, placing second at the Medellín half marathon with a run of 73:18 minutes (a Colombian record) and winning the Bogotá 12K.

Caballero made her debut over the marathon distance at the 2011 Boston Marathon and finished in eighth place with a time of 2:26:17 hours. This was unofficially a South American record (the course was downhill) and gained her selection for that event at the 2012 Summer Olympics. She ran a half marathon best of 72:35 minutes to take seventh at the Rock 'n' Roll Philadelphia Half Marathon. An appearance at the 2011 Pan American Games saw her increase her track medal haul, as she placed third in the 10,000 m and also managed sixth in the 5000 m. She ran at the 2012 New York Half Marathon, but finished 26th in a high calibre field. She entered the marathon at the 2012 London Olympics, but failed to finish the race.

Caballero began 2013 with a South American record run at the NYC Half Marathon, completing the distance in 1:10:30 hours to take seventh place.

== Achievements ==
Year	Competition	Venue	Position	Event	Notes
Representing Colombia
2004	South American U23 Championships	Barquisimeto, Venezuela	3rd	1500m	4:37.62
2004	South American U23 Championships	Barquisimeto, Venezuela	2nd	3000m steeplechase	10:24.09
2005	Bolivarian Games	Armenia, Colombia	3rd	3000 m steeplechase	10:51.85 A
