= Cruz Nonata da Silva =

Brazilian long-distance runner

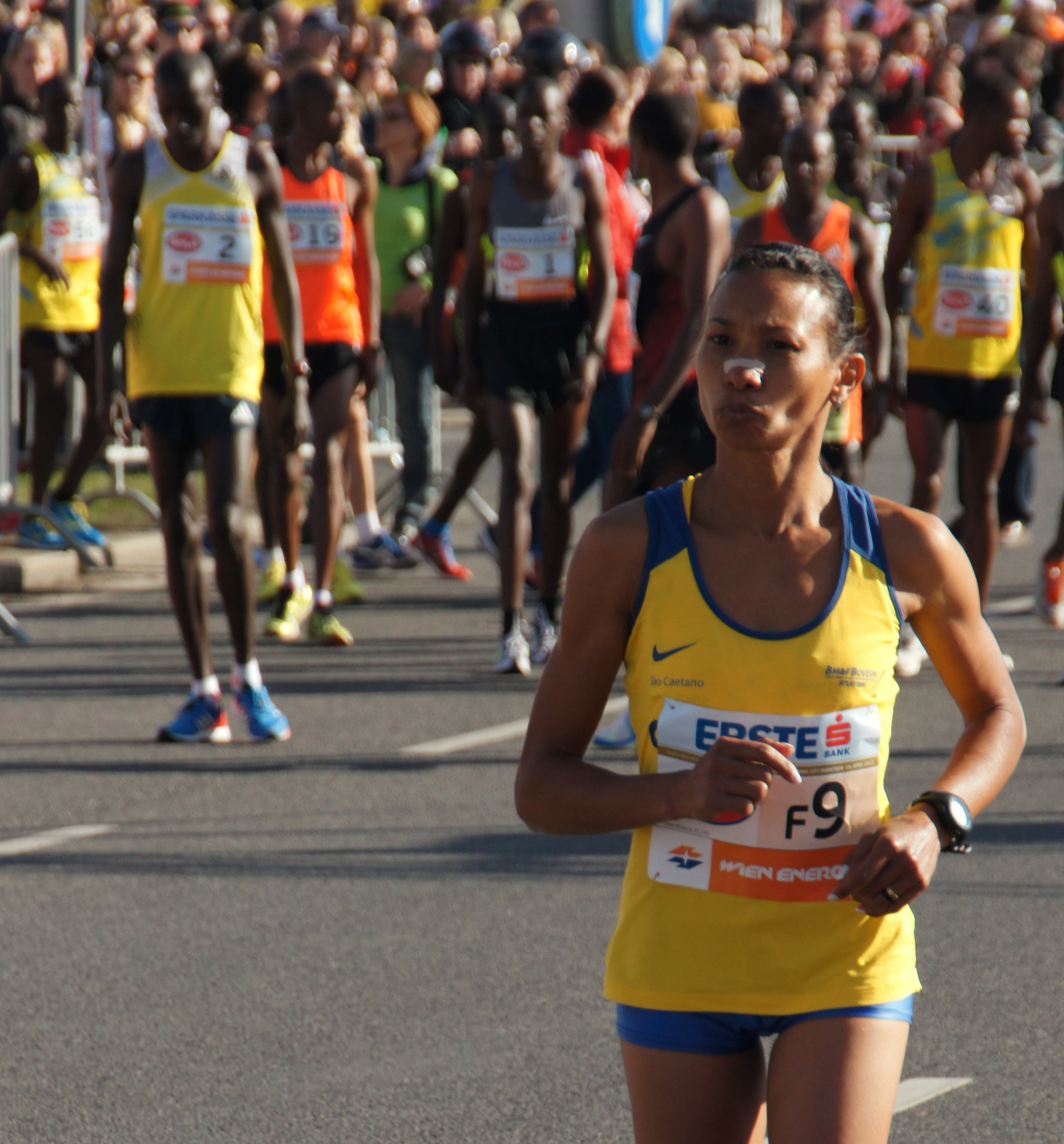
- Da Silva in 2013

Personal information
- Born: 18 August 1974 (age 51) Teresina, Brazil

Sport
- Sport: Track and field
Medal record
Representing Brazil
Pan American Games
Silver medal – second place	2011 Guadalajara	5000m
Silver medal – second place	2011 Guadalajara	10,000m

Cruz Nonata da Silva (born August 18, 1974) is a Brazilian long distance runner. She gained two silver medals at the 2011 Pan American Games in Mexico.

== Life ==
Da Silva was born in Teresina in 1974. She took up running at the age of thirty.

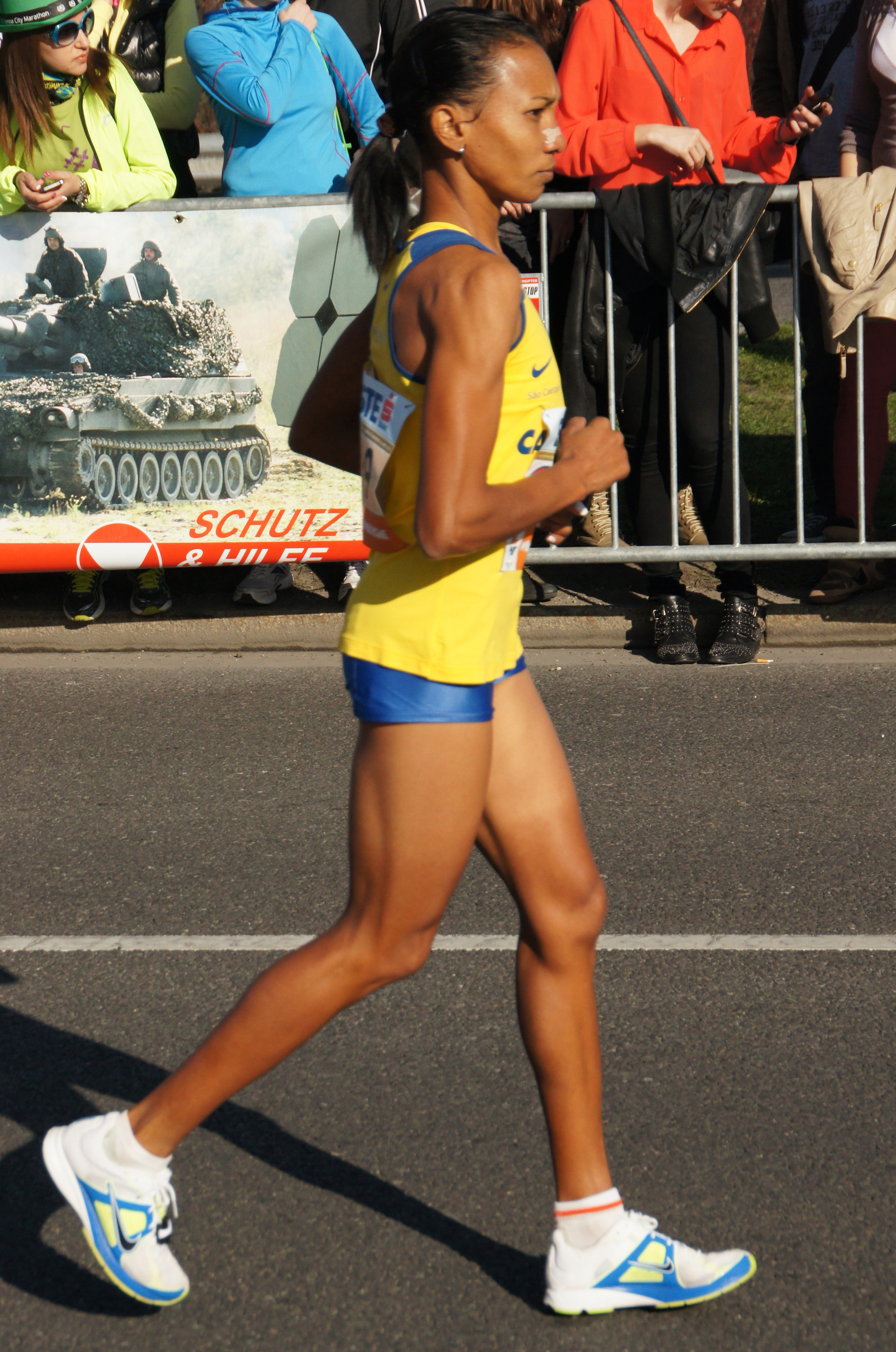
da Silva at the Vienna Marathon in 2013

She gained her reputation at the 2011 Pan American Games where 42 nations competed at locations around Guadalajara in Mexico. Brazil sent 62 athletes. She first took a silver medal in the 10,000 metre race. At the same event she also competed in the 5,000 metre race taking second place behind local runner Marisol Romero. She was beaten by about five seconds having a time of 16min29s75. She was given her second silver medal, and the bronze medal was taken by Ines Melchor from Peru who was over 10 seconds behind her.

In 2013 she won the 8 km cross country race in 30:25 beating Nadia Rodriguez from Argentina by 25 seconds at the South American Cross Country Championships in Concordia.

In 2016 she had to pause her training due to an injury.

In 2017 she was living in Ceilândia and still competing but her running was self funded as she was looking for a sponsor. She and her coach José Alessandro were planning more events. Two years later she was competing as a veteran (and a grandmother) in the Salvador Marathon. She finished the race in fourth place and with a time of 02:56:33.

== Private life ==
She has a husband, Raimundo, and a daughter Alessandra.
