= Marisol Romero =

Mexican long-distance runner

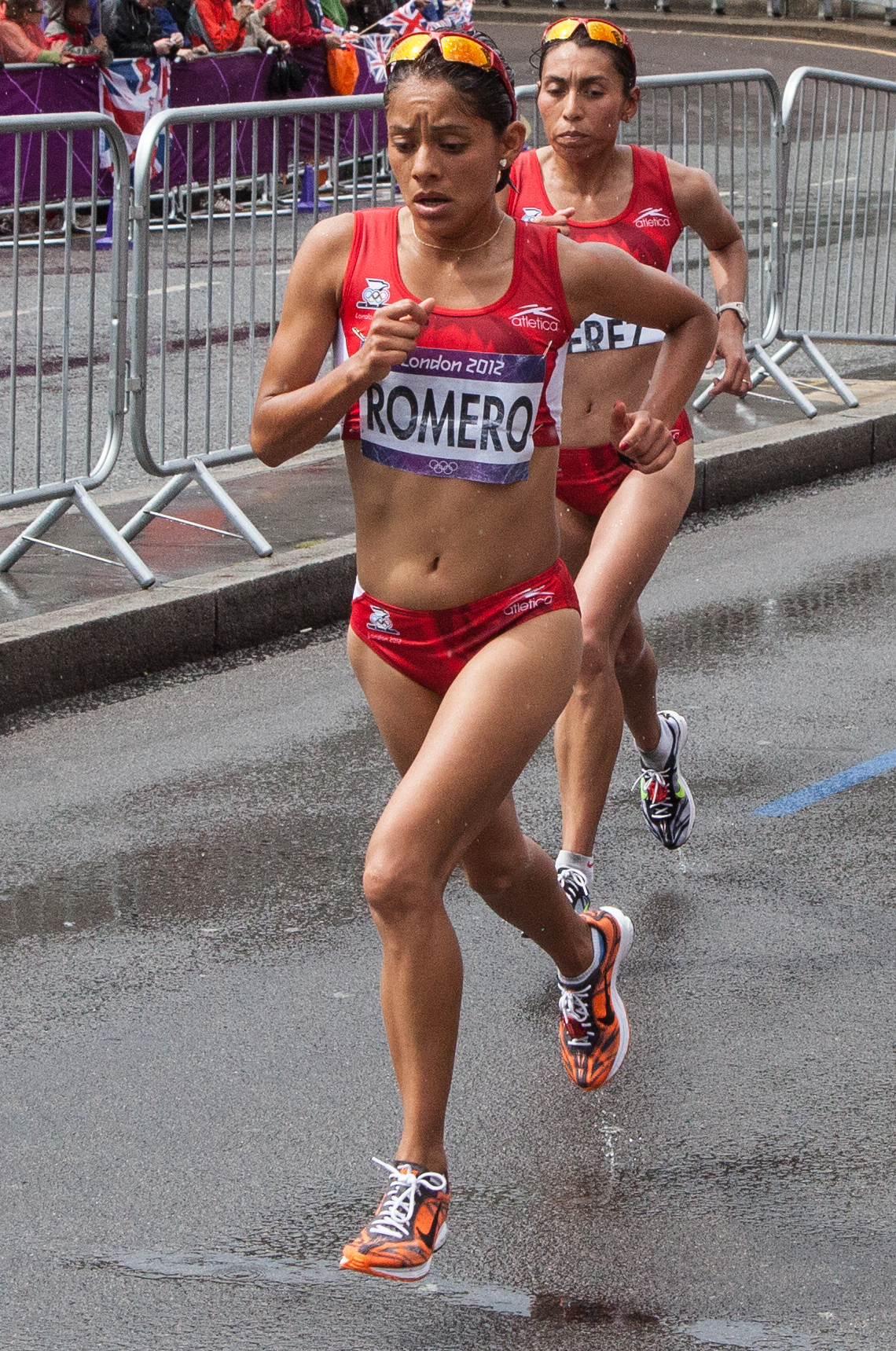
- Romero in the 2012 Summer Olympics marathon

Personal information
- Born: January 26, 1983 (age 43) Mexico City, Mexico
- Height: 1.55 m (5 ft 1 in)
- Weight: 46 kg (101 lb)

Sport
- Country: Mexico
- Sport: Athletics
- Event: Marathon
Medal record
Pan American Games
| Gold medal – first place | 2011 Guadalajara | 5000 m |
| Gold medal – first place | 2011 Guadalajara | 10,000 m |
Central American and Caribbean Games
| Gold medal – first place | 2010 Mayagüez | Marathon |
CAC Championships
| Gold medal – first place | 2011 Mayagüez | 5000 m |

Marisol Guadalupe Romero Rosales (born 26 January 1983) is a Mexican long-distance runner who competes over 5000 metres and 10,000 metres on the track and in half marathon and marathon road races. She won the marathon at the 2010 Central American and Caribbean Games and completed a 5000/10,000 m gold medal double at the 2011 Pan American Games.

Her first competitive outings came in 2006, when she set a personal best of 1:16:48 hours as runner-up at the Mazatlán half marathon and recorded a time of 2:51:32 hours at the Mexico City Marathon. She improved her best marathon time of 2:43:21 hours the following year and won the silver medal in the 5000 m at the 2007 NACAC Championships in San Salvador. Romero made her debut on the global stage at the 2009 IAAF World Half Marathon Championships and finished in 39th place. The following year she ran a marathon best of 2:42:33 hours in León, Mexico before going on to claim the women's gold medal in the event at the 2010 Central American and Caribbean Games. She ran a half marathon best of 1:14:13 hours at the 2010 IAAF World Half Marathon Championships in Nanning to finish in 22nd place in the women's race.

At the beginning of the 2011 season she ran in California and set track bests of 15:27.94 minutes and 32:45.05 minutes for the 5000 m and 10,000 m, respectively. At the 2011 Central American and Caribbean Championships in Athletics, she won the second regional title of her career, this time taking the 5000 m gold medal. Romero was chosen to represent Mexico in both long-distance track events at the 2011 Pan American Games in Guadalajara. She completed a distance-double for the host nation, becoming the second woman to ever achieve the feat at the tournament after her fellow Mexican Adriana Fernández.

She began 2012 with a win at the LALA Marathon in Torreón, which she completed in a time of 2:31:15 hours. She competed at the 2012 Summer Olympics, finishing in 46th place in the women's marathon.
