= Thamy Ventorin =

Brazilian swimmer (born 1987)

Personal information
- Full name: Thamy Caretta Ventorin
- Nationality: Brazil
- Born: August 27, 1987 (age 39) Vitória, Espírito Santo, Brazil
- Height: 1.70 m (5 ft 7 in)
- Weight: 60 kg (130 lb)

Sport
- Sport: Swimming
- Strokes: Breaststroke
Medal record
Women's swimming
Representing Brazil
Pan American Games
Silver medal – second place	2011 Guadalajara	4 x 200m free

Thamy Caretta Ventorin (born August 27, 1987, in Vitória) is a Brazilian competitive swimmer.

In 2009, she broke the short-course South American record in the 200-metre breaststroke, with a time of 2:28.62.

Integrating Brazilian national delegation that disputed the 2011 Pan American Games in Guadalajara, she won the silver medal in 4×200-metre freestyle by participating at heats. She also finished 12th in the 200-metre breaststroke.

In August 2012, she was hospitalized 18 days due to a respiratory problem that has not been identified, but managed to heal.
