= Gabriela Rocha (swimmer) =

Brazilian swimmer (born 1995)

Personal information
- Full name: Gabriela Campagnoli Rocha
- Nationality: Brazil
- Born: May 20, 1995 (age 31) Vitória, Espírito Santo, Brazil
- Height: 1.65 m (5 ft 5 in)
- Weight: 56 kg (123 lb)

Sport
- Sport: Swimming
- Strokes: Freestyle
Medal record
Women's swimming
Representing Brazil
Pan American Games
Silver medal – second place	2011 Guadalajara	4 x 200m free

Gabriela Campagnoli Rocha (born May 20, 1995 in Vitória) is a Brazilian competitive swimmer.

At 16 years old, integrating Brazilian national delegation that disputed the 2011 Pan American Games in Guadalajara, she won the silver medal in 4×200-metre freestyle by participating at heats. She also finished 12th in the 800-metre freestyle.
