= Brazil at the 2015 Pan American Games =

- IOC code: BRA
- NOC: Brazilian Olympic Committee
- Website: www.cob.org.br

in Toronto, Canada 10–26 July 2015
- Competitors: 590 in 35 sports
- Flag bearer (opening): Thiago Pereira
- Flag bearer (closing): Formiga
- Medals Ranked 3rd: Gold 42 Silver 39 Bronze 60 Total 141

Pan American Games appearances (overview)
- 1951; 1955; 1959; 1963; 1967; 1971; 1975; 1979; 1983; 1987; 1991; 1995; 1999; 2003; 2007; 2011; 2015; 2019; 2023

Brazil competed in the 2015 Pan American Games in Hamilton, Canada from July 10 to 26, 2015. The Brazilian Olympic Committee selected a team of 590 athletes, 314 men and 276 women. This is the 17th appearance of the country in the Pan American Games. The goal of the Brazilian Olympic Committee is to finish among top 3 countries on total medals, as part of preparations for the 2016 Summer Olympics, in Rio de Janeiro, and to surpass the number of medals of Guadalajara (141). Women's field hockey, baseball, racquetball and speed skating competitions will be the only sports without Brazilian representation at these games.

On July 4, 2015, the swimmer Thiago Pereira was named the flagbearer of the team during the opening ceremony. Pereira has already been the Brazilian flagbearer during the 2007 Pan American Games closing ceremony. Brazil's team competed in all sports except in racquetball.

== Competitors ==
The following is the list of number of competitors participating in the Games. Note that reserves in fencing, field hockey, football, and handball are not counted as athletes:

Sport	Men	Women	Total
Archery	3	3	6
Athletics	43	37	80
Badminton	4	4	8
Basketball	11	12	23
Beach volleyball	2	2	4
Bowling	2	2	4
Boxing	7	1	8
Canoeing	12	7	19
Cycling	17	9	26
Diving	4	4	8
Equestrian	12	1	13
Fencing	9	9	18
Field hockey	16	0	16
Football	18	18	36
Golf	2	2	4
Gymnastics	6	14	20
Handball	15	15	30
Judo	7	7	14
Karate	3	4	7
Modern pentathlon	2	3	5
Roller sports	1	1	2
Rowing	16	5	21
Rugby sevens	12	12	24
Sailing	12	6	18
Shooting	13	6	19
Softball		15	15
Squash		3	3
Swimming	20	18	37
Synchronized swimming		9	9
Table tennis	3	3	6
Taekwondo	4	4	8
Tennis	3	3	6
Triathlon	3	3	6
Volleyball	12	12	24
Water polo	13	13	26
Water skiing	2	0	2
Weightlifting	4	4	8
Wrestling	3	5	8
Total	316	276	592

== Medalists ==
The following competitors from Brazil won medals at the games. In the by discipline sections below, medalists' names are bolded.

Medal	Name	Sport	Event	Date
1st place, gold medalist(s)	Erika Miranda	Judo	-52 kg	11 July
1st place, gold medalist(s)	Felipe Almeida Wu	Shooting	10 metre air pistol	12 July
1st place, gold medalist(s)	Charles Chibana	Judo	-66 kg	12 July
1st place, gold medalist(s)	Marcel Sturmer	Roller sports	Free skating	12 July
1st place, gold medalist(s)	Isaquias Queiroz	Canoeing	Men's C-1 1000 metres	13 July
1st place, gold medalist(s)	Tiago Camilo	Judo	Men's 90 kg	13 July
1st place, gold medalist(s)	Arthur Zanetti	Gymnastics	Men's rings	14 July
1st place, gold medalist(s)	David Moura	Judo	Men's +100 kg	14 July
1st place, gold medalist(s)	Isaquias Queiroz	Canoeing	Men's C-1 200 metres	14 July
1st place, gold medalist(s)	Leonardo de Deus	Swimming	Men's 200 m butterfly	14 July
1st place, gold medalist(s)	Luciano Corrêa	Judo	Men's 100 kg	14 July
1st place, gold medalist(s)	Matheus Santana; João de Lucca; Bruno Fratus; Marcelo Chierighini	Swimming	Men's 4 × 100 metre freestyle relay	14 July
1st place, gold medalist(s)	Fernando Reis	Weightlifting	Men's +105 kg	15 July
1st place, gold medalist(s)	João de Lucca	Swimming	Men's 200 m freestyle	15 July
1st place, gold medalist(s)	Thiago Simon	Swimming	Men's 200 m breaststroke	15 July
1st place, gold medalist(s)	Luiz Altamir Melo; João de Lucca; Thiago Pereira; Nicolas Oliveira	Swimming	Men's 4 × 200 metre freestyle relay	15 July
1st place, gold medalist(s)	Brandonn Almeida	Swimming	Men's 400 m individual medley	16 July
1st place, gold medalist(s)	Joice Silva	Wrestling	Women's Freestyle 58 kg	16 July
1st place, gold medalist(s)	Júlio Almeida	Shooting	Men's 50 metre pistol	17 July
1st place, gold medalist(s)	Cassio Rippel	Shooting	Men's 50 metre rifle prone	17 July
1st place, gold medalist(s)	Felipe França	Swimming	Men's 100 m breaststroke	17 July
1st place, gold medalist(s)	Etiene Medeiros	Swimming	Women's 100 m backstroke	17 July
1st place, gold medalist(s)	Adriana Aparecida da Silva	Athletics	Women's marathon	18 July
1st place, gold medalist(s)	Dayane Amaral; Morgana Gmach; Emanuelle Lima; Jessica Maier; Ana Paula Ribeiro; Beatriz Pomini	Gymnastics	Women's rhythmic group all-around	18 July
1st place, gold medalist(s)	Ricardo Santos	Sailing	Men's RS:X	18 July
1st place, gold medalist(s)	Patrícia Freitas	Sailing	Women's RS:X	18 July
1st place, gold medalist(s)	Yane Marques	Modern pentathlon	Women's	18 July
1st place, gold medalist(s)	Henrique Rodrigues	Swimming	Men's 200 m individual medley	18 July
1st place, gold medalist(s)	Guilherme Guido; Felipe França; Arthur Mendes; Marcelo Chierighini	Swimming	Men's 4 × 100 metre medley relay	18 July
1st place, gold medalist(s)	Dayane Amaral; Morgana Gmach; Emanuelle Lima; Jessica Maier; Ana Paula Ribeiro; Beatriz Pomini	Gymnastics	Women's rhythmic group 5 ribbons	19 July
1st place, gold medalist(s)	Ana Sátila	Canoeing	Women's slalom C-1	19 July
1st place, gold medalist(s)	Hugo Calderano; Thiago Monteiro; Gustavo Tsuboi	Table tennis	Men's team	21 July
1st place, gold medalist(s)	Juliana Paula dos Santos	Athletics	Women's 5000m	21 July
1st place, gold medalist(s)	Douglas Brose	Karate	Men's 60 kg	23 July
1st place, gold medalist(s)	Valéria Kumizaki	Karate	Women's 55 kg	23 July
1st place, gold medalist(s)	Brazil women's national handball team	Handball	Women's tournament	24 July
1st place, gold medalist(s)	Marcelo Suartz	Bowling	Men's singles	25 July
1st place, gold medalist(s)	Brazil women's national football team	Football	Women's tournament	25 July
1st place, gold medalist(s)	Brazil men's national basketball team	Basketball	Men's tournament	25 July
1st place, gold medalist(s)	Hugo Calderano	Table tennis	Men's singles	25 July
1st place, gold medalist(s)	Brazil men's national handball team	Handball	Men's tournament	25 July
1st place, gold medalist(s)	Nathália Brozulatto	Karate	Women's 68 kg	25 July
2nd place, silver medalist(s)	Felipe Kitadai	Judo	-60 kg	11 July
2nd place, silver medalist(s)	Arthur Mariano; Arthur Zanetti; Caio Souza; Francisco Barreto Júnior; Lucas Bitencourt	Gymnastics	Artistic team all-around	11 July
2nd place, silver medalist(s)	Roberto Maehler; Vagner Souta; Celso Dias; Gilvan Ribeiro	Canoeing	K-4 1000 m	12 July
2nd place, silver medalist(s)	Talitha Haas	Roller sports	Free skating	12 July
2nd place, silver medalist(s)	Erlon Silva; Isaquias Queiroz	Canoeing	Men's C-2 1000 metres	13 July
2nd place, silver medalist(s)	Ingrid Oliveira; Giovanna Pedroso	Diving	Women's synchronized 10 metre platform	13 July
2nd place, silver medalist(s)	Edson Silva	Canoeing	Men's K-1 200 metres	14 July
2nd place, silver medalist(s)	Mayra Aguiar	Judo	-78 kg	14 July
2nd place, silver medalist(s)	Fabiana Beltrame	Rowing	Women's lightweight single sculls	15 July
2nd place, silver medalist(s)	Mateus Gregório	Weightlifting	Men's 105 kg	15 July
2nd place, silver medalist(s)	Emerson Duarte	Shooting	Men's 25 metre rapid fire pistol	15 July
2nd place, silver medalist(s)	Lohaynny Vicente; Luana Vicente	Badminton	Women's doubles	15 July
2nd place, silver medalist(s)	Hugo Arthuso; Daniel Paiola	Badminton	Men's doubles	15 July
2nd place, silver medalist(s)	Brazil men's national water polo team	Water polo	Men's tournament	15 July
2nd place, silver medalist(s)	Manuella Lyrio; Jéssica Cavalheiro; Joanna Maranhão; Larissa Oliveira	Swimming	Women's 4 × 200 metre freestyle relay	16 July
2nd place, silver medalist(s)	Bruno Fratus	Swimming	Men's 50 metre freestyle	17 July
2nd place, silver medalist(s)	Etiene Medeiros	Swimming	Women's 50 metre freestyle	17 July
2nd place, silver medalist(s)	Guilherme Guido	Swimming	Men's 100 metre backstroke	17 July
2nd place, silver medalist(s)	Felipe Lima	Swimming	Men's 100 metre breaststroke	17 July
2nd place, silver medalist(s)	Robert Scheidt	Sailing	Laser	18 July
2nd place, silver medalist(s)	Martine Grael; Kahena Kunze	Sailing	49er FX	18 July
2nd place, silver medalist(s)	Thiago Pereira	Swimming	Men's 200 metre individual medley	18 July
2nd place, silver medalist(s)	Érica de Sena	Athletics	Women's 20 kilometres walk	19 July
2nd place, silver medalist(s)	Ruy Fonseca; Carlos Paro; Márcio Jorge; Henrique Piombon	Equestrian	Team eventing	19 July
2nd place, silver medalist(s)	Pedro Gonçalves	Canoeing	Men's slalom K-1	19 July
2nd place, silver medalist(s)	Ana Sátila	Canoeing	Women's slalom K-1	19 July
2nd place, silver medalist(s)	Charles Correa; Anderson Oliveira	Canoeing	Men's slalom C-2	19 July
2nd place, silver medalist(s)	Dayane Amaral; Morgana Gmach; Emanuelle Lima; Jessica Maier; Ana Paula Ribeiro; Beatriz Pomini	Gymnastics	Women's rhythmic group 6 clubs + 2 hoops	20 July
2nd place, silver medalist(s)	Vitor Araújo; Álvaro Morais Filho	Beach volleyball	Men's tournament	21 July
2nd place, silver medalist(s)	Gui Lin; Caroline Kumahara; Lígia Silva	Table tennis	Women's team	21 July
2nd place, silver medalist(s)	Keila Costa	Athletics	Women's triple jump	21 July
2nd place, silver medalist(s)	Ronald Julião	Athletics	Men's discus throw	23 July
2nd place, silver medalist(s)	Fabiana Murer	Athletics	Women's pole vault	23 July
2nd place, silver medalist(s)	Ghislain Perrier; Fernando Scavasin; Guilherme Toldo	Fencing	Men's team foil	25 July
2nd place, silver medalist(s)	Gui Lin	Table tennis	Women's singles	25 July
2nd place, silver medalist(s)	Gustavo Tsuboi	Table tennis	Men's singles	25 July
2nd place, silver medalist(s)	Gustavo dos Santos; Vitor Hugo dos Santos; Bruno Barros; Aldemir Júnior	Athletics	Men's 4 × 100 metres relay	25 July
2nd place, silver medalist(s)	Brazil women's national volleyball team	Volleyball	Women's tournament	25 July
2nd place, silver medalist(s)	Brazil men's national volleyball team	Volleyball	Men's tournament	26 July
3rd place, bronze medalist(s)	Nathalia Brigida	Judo	-48 kg	11 July
3rd place, bronze medalist(s)	João Victor Oliva; João Paulo Santos; Leandro Aparecida; Sarah Waddel	Equestrian	Team dressage	12 July
3rd place, bronze medalist(s)	Bruna Piloto	Weightlifting	Women's 63 kg	12 July
3rd place, bronze medalist(s)	Team	Rugby sevens	Women's	12 July
3rd place, bronze medalist(s)	Daniele Hypólito; Flávia Saraiva; Julie Kim Sinmon; Letícia Costa; Lorrane dos Santos	Gymnastics	Artistic team all-around	12 July
3rd place, bronze medalist(s)	Rafaela Silva	Judo	-57 kg	12 July
3rd place, bronze medalist(s)	Celso Oliveira; Vagner Souta	Canoeing	Men's K-2 1000 metres	13 July
3rd place, bronze medalist(s)	Ana Paula Vergutz	Canoeing	Women's K-1 500 metres	13 July
3rd place, bronze medalist(s)	Flávia Saraiva	Gymnastics	Women's artistic individual all-around	13 July
3rd place, bronze medalist(s)	Mariana Silva	Judo	-63 kg	13 July
3rd place, bronze medalist(s)	Victor Penalber	Judo	-81 kg	13 July
3rd place, bronze medalist(s)	Maria Portela	Judo	-70 kg	13 July
3rd place, bronze medalist(s)	Valdenice Nascimento; Vagner Souta	Canoeing	Women's C-1 200 metres	14 July
3rd place, bronze medalist(s)	Edson Silva; Hans Mallmann	Canoeing	Men's K-2 200 metres	14 July
3rd place, bronze medalist(s)	Brazil women's national water polo team	Water polo	Women's tournament	14 July
3rd place, bronze medalist(s)	Jaqueline Ferreira	Weightlifting	Women's 75 kg	14 July
3rd place, bronze medalist(s)	Marcelo Chierighini	Swimming	Men's 100 m freestyle	14 July
3rd place, bronze medalist(s)	Joanna Maranhão	Swimming	Women's 200 metre butterfly	14 July
3rd place, bronze medalist(s)	Larissa Oliveira; Graciele Herrmann; Etiene Medeiros; Daynara de Paula	Swimming	Women's 4 × 100 metre freestyle relay	14 July
3rd place, bronze medalist(s)	Maria Suellen Altheman	Judo	+78 kg	14 July
3rd place, bronze medalist(s)	Caio Souza	Gymnastics	Men's vault	15 July
3rd place, bronze medalist(s)	Leonardo de Deus	Swimming	Men's 200 m backstroke	15 July
3rd place, bronze medalist(s)	Manuella Lyrio	Swimming	Women's 200 metre freestyle	15 July
3rd place, bronze medalist(s)	Thiago Pereira	Swimming	Men's 200 m breaststroke	15 July
3rd place, bronze medalist(s)	Alex Tjong; Lohaynny Vicente	Badminton	Mixed doubles	16 July
3rd place, bronze medalist(s)	Flávio Cipriano; Kacio Freitas; Hugo Osteti	Cycling	Men's team sprint	16 July
3rd place, bronze medalist(s)	Davi Albino	Wrestling	Men's Greco-Roman 98 kg	16 July
3rd place, bronze medalist(s)	Joanna Maranhão	Swimming	Women's 400 metre individual medley	16 July
3rd place, bronze medalist(s)	Marcus Vinicius D'Almeida; Bernardo Oliveira; Daniel Xavier	Archery	Men's team	17 July
3rd place, bronze medalist(s)	Gideoni Monteiro	Cycling	Men's omnium	17 July
3rd place, bronze medalist(s)	Leonardo de Deus	Swimming	Men's 400 m freestyle	17 July
3rd place, bronze medalist(s)	Aline Ferreira	Wrestling	Women's Freestyle 75 kg	17 July
3rd place, bronze medalist(s)	Fernanda Decnop	Sailing	Laser Radial	18 July
3rd place, bronze medalist(s)	Brandonn Almeida	Swimming	Men's 1500 m freestyle	18 July
3rd place, bronze medalist(s)	Etiene Medeiros; Jhennifer Conceição; Daynara de Paula; Larissa Oliveira	Swimming	Women's 4 × 100 metre medley relay	18 July
3rd place, bronze medalist(s)	Caio Bonfim	Athletics	Men's 20 kilometres walk	19 July
3rd place, bronze medalist(s)	Angélica Kvieczynski	Gymnastics	Women's rhythmic individual hoop	19 July
3rd place, bronze medalist(s)	Claudio Biekarck; Gunnar Ficker; Maria Altimira	Sailing	Lightning	19 July
3rd place, bronze medalist(s)	Ruy Fonseca	Equestrian	Individual eventing	19 July
3rd place, bronze medalist(s)	Felipe Borges	Canoeing	Men's slalom C-1	19 July
3rd place, bronze medalist(s)	Iris Sing	Taekwondo	Women's 49 kg	19 July
3rd place, bronze medalist(s)	Angélica Kvieczynski	Gymnastics	Women's rhythmic individual ribbon	20 July
3rd place, bronze medalist(s)	Renzo Agresta	Fencing	Men's sabre	20 July
3rd place, bronze medalist(s)	Carolina Horta; Liliane Maestrini	Beach volleyball	Women's tournament	21 July
3rd place, bronze medalist(s)	Nathalie Moellhausen	Fencing	Women's épée	21 July
3rd place, bronze medalist(s)	Jucilene de Lima	Athletics	Women's javelin throw	21 July
3rd place, bronze medalist(s)	Joedison Teixeira	Boxing	Men's Light welterweight	22 July
3rd place, bronze medalist(s)	Ghislain Perrier	Fencing	Men's foil	22 July
3rd place, bronze medalist(s)	Flávia de Lima	Athletics	Women's 800 metres	22 July
3rd place, bronze medalist(s)	Raphaella Galacho	Taekwondo	Women's +68 kg	22 July
3rd place, bronze medalist(s)	Rafael Lima	Boxing	Men's Super heavyweight	23 July
3rd place, bronze medalist(s)	Aline Souza	Karate	Women's 50 kg	23 July
3rd place, bronze medalist(s)	Luiz Alberto de Araújo	Athletics	Men's decathlon	23 July
3rd place, bronze medalist(s)	Nathalie Moellhausen; Amanda Simeão; Rayssa Costa	Fencing	Women's team épée	24 July
3rd place, bronze medalist(s)	Júlio César de Oliveira	Athletics	Men's javelin throw	24 July
3rd place, bronze medalist(s)	Caroline Kumahara	Table tennis	Women's singles	25 July
3rd place, bronze medalist(s)	Thiago Monteiro	Table tennis	Men's singles	25 July
3rd place, bronze medalist(s)	Brazil men's national football team	Football	Men's tournament	25 July
3rd place, bronze medalist(s)	Vanessa Spínola	Athletics	Women's heptathlon	25 July
3rd place, bronze medalist(s)	Isabela dos Santos	Karate	Women's +68 kg	25 July

**Medals by sport**
**Sport**	1st place, gold medalist(s)	2nd place, silver medalist(s)	3rd place, bronze medalist(s)	Total
Archery	0	0	1	1
Athletics	2	5	6	13
Badminton	0	2	1	3
Basketball	1	0	0	1
Beach volleyball	0	1	1	2
Bowling	1	0	0	1
Boxing	0	0	2	2
Canoeing	3	6	5	14
Cycling	0	0	2	2
Diving	0	1	0	1
Equestrian	0	1	2	3
Fencing	0	1	4	5
Football	1	0	1	2
Gymnastics	3	2	5	10
Handball	2	0	0	2
Judo	5	2	6	13
Karate	3	0	2	5
Modern pentathlon	1	0	0	1
Rowing	0	1	0	1
Roller sports	1	1	0	2
Rugby sevens	0	0	1	1
Sailing	2	2	2	6
Shooting	3	1	0	4
Swimming	10	6	10	26
Taekwondo	0	0	2	2
Table tennis	2	3	2	7
Volleyball	0	2	0	2
Water polo	0	1	1	2
Weightlifting	1	1	2	4
Wrestling	1	0	2	3
**Total**	**42**	**39**	**60**	**141**

**Medals by day**
**Day**	1st place, gold medalist(s)	2nd place, silver medalist(s)	3rd place, bronze medalist(s)	**Total**
July 11	1	2	1	4
July 12	3	2	5	10
July 13	2	2	6	10
July 14	6	2	8	16
July 15	4	6	4	14
July 16	2	1	4	7
July 17	4	4	4	12
July 18	7	3	3	13
July 19	2	5	6	13
July 20	0	1	2	3
July 21	2	3	3	8
July 22	0	0	4	4
July 23	2	2	3	7
July 24	1	0	2	3
July 25	6	5	5	16
July 26	0	1	0	1
**Total**	**42**	**39**	**60**	**141**

**Medals by gender**
**Gender**	1st place, gold medalist(s)	2nd place, silver medalist(s)	3rd place, bronze medalist(s)	**Total**
Male	28	23	24	75
Female	14	16	33	63
Mixed	0	0	3	3
**Total**	**42**	**39**	**60**	**141**

**Multiple medalists**
**Name**	**Sport**	1st place, gold medalist(s)	2nd place, silver medalist(s)	3rd place, bronze medalist(s)	**Total**
Brandonn Almeida	Swimming	1	0	1	2
Dayane Amaral	Gymnastics	2	1	0	3
Hugo Calderano	Table Tennis	2	0	0	2
Marcelo Chierighini	Swimming	2	0	1	3
Leonardo de Deus	Swimming	1	0	2	3
Joao de Lucca	Swimming	3	0	0	3
Felipe França Silva	Swimming	2	0	0	2
Bruno Fratus	Swimming	1	1	0	2
Morgana Gmach	Gymnastics	2	1	0	3
Guilherme Guido	Swimming	1	1	0	2
Emanuelle Lima	Gymnastics	2	1	0	3
Felipe Lima	Swimming	1	1	0	2
Jessica Maier	Gymnastics	2	1	0	3
Etiene Medeiros	Swimming	1	1	2	4
Thiago Monteiro	Table Tennis	1	0	1	2
Nicolas Oliveira	Swimming	2	0	0	2
Thiago Pereira	Swimming	3	2	1	5
Beatriz Pomini	Gymnastics	2	1	0	3
Isaquias Queiroz	Canoeing	2	1	0	3
Ana Ribero	Gymnastics	2	1	0	3
Henrique Rodrigues	Swimming	2	0	0	2
Ana Sátila	Canoeing	1	1	0	2
Thiago Simon	Swimming	2	0	0	2
Gustavo Tsuboi	Table Tennis	1	1	0	2
Arthur Zanetti	Gymnastics	1	1	0	2

== Archery ==
Brazil qualified two male and three female archers based on its performance at the 2014 Pan American Championships. Later Brazil qualified 1 more man based on its performance at the 2015 Copa Merengue. The team was named on 3 June 2015.

Men

Athlete	Event	Ranking Round		Round of 32	Round of 16	Quarterfinals	Semifinals	Final / BM	Rank
Athlete	Event	Score	Seed	Opposition Score	Opposition Score	Opposition Score	Opposition Score	Opposition Score	Rank
Marcus D'Almeida	Individual	664	4	Castro (GUA); W 6–0	Xavier (BRA); W 6–5	Álvarez (MEX); L 3–7	Did not advance		
Bernardo Oliveira	Individual	631	22	Stevens (CUB); L 5–6	Did not advance				
Daniel Xavier	Individual	633	20	Gimpel (CHI); W 6–4	D'Almeida (BRA); L 5–6	Did not advance			
Marcus D'Almeida; Bernardo Oliveira; Daniel Xavier	Team	1928	5	—N/a	Bye	Duenas / Lyon / Rivest-Bunster (CAN); W 6–0	Ellison / Garrett / Klimitchek (USA); L 0–6	Franco / Puentes / Stevens (CUB); W 5–3	3rd place, bronze medalist(s)

Women

Athlete	Event	Ranking Round		Round of 32	Round of 16	Quarterfinals	Semifinals	Final / BM	Rank
Athlete	Event	Score	Seed	Opposition Score	Opposition Score	Opposition Score	Opposition Score	Opposition Score	Rank
Ane Marcelle dos Santos	Individual	630	8	Ojea (CUB); W 7–1	Rendón (COL); L 2–6	Did not advance			
Larissa Feitosa	Individual	619	12	Valencia (GUA); W 6–4	Sánchez (COL); L0-6	Did not advance			
Sarah Nikitin	Individual	618	13	Villegas (VEN); W 6–4	Hinojosa (MEX); L 2–6	Did not advance			
Ane Marcelle dos Santos; Larissa Feitosa; Sarah Nikitin	Team	—N/a			Bye	Brito / Mendes / Villegas (VEN); L 1 – 5	Did not advance		

== Athletics ==
Brazil has qualified 80 athletes in total (43 men and 37 women). The roster was announced on June 8, 2015.

Key

- Note–Ranks given for track events are within the athlete's heat only
- Q = Qualified for the next round
- q = Qualified for the next round as a fastest loser or, in field events, by position without achieving the qualifying target\
- DSQ = Disqualified
- SB = Seasonal best
- DNF = Did not finish
- DNS = Did not start
- N/A = Round not applicable for the event
- Bye = Athlete not required to compete in round
- NM = No mark

Men
Track & road events

Athlete	Event	Heat		Semifinal		Final	
Athlete	Event	Result	Rank	Result	Rank	Result	Rank
Vítor Hugo dos Santos	100m	10.31	17	Did not advance			
José Carlos Moreira	100m	DSQ		Did not advance			
Aldemir da Silva Junior	200 m	20.54	12 Q	20.65	12	Did not advance	
Bruno de Barros	200 m	20.41 SB	8 Q	20.66	13	Did not advance	
Hugo de Sousa	400 m	—N/a		46.26	7 q	46.07	7
Lutimar Paes	800 m	—N/a		1:49.76	11	Did not advance	
Cleiton Abrão	800 m	—N/a		1:49.32	7 Q	1:48.82	5
Thiago André	1500 m	—N/a				3:43.71	8
Carlos Antonio dos Santos	1500 m	—N/a				3:44.36	9
Altobeli da Silva	5,000 m	—N/a				13:49.00	6
David de Macedo	5,000 m	—N/a				14:08.52	12
Giovani dos Santos	10,000m	—N/a				DNF	
Daniel Chaves da Silva	10,000m	—N/a				DSQ	
Jean Carlos Machado	3000 m steeplechase	—N/a				9:04.21	8
Éder Souza	110 m hurdles	13.80	16	—N/a		Did not advance	
Jonatha Mendes	110 m hurdles	13.81	17	—N/a		Did not advance	
Mahau Suguimati	400m hurdles	—N/a		50.29	3 Q	49.68	8
Hederson Estefani	400m hurdles	—N/a		51.06	10	Did not advance	
Franck de Almeida	Marathon	—N/a				DNF	
Ubiratan dos Santos	Marathon	—N/a				2:34:53	13
Caio Bonfim	20 km walk	—N/a				1:24:43	3rd place, bronze medalist(s)
Jonathan Riekmann	50 km walk	—N/a				DNF	DNF
Cláudio dos Santos	50 km walk	—N/a				4:18:08	8
Vítor Hugo dos Santos; José Carlos Moreira; Aldemir da Silva Junior; Bruno de Barros; Gustavo dos Santos; Gabriel Constantino	4 × 100 m relay	38.74	4 q	—N/a		38.68	2nd place, silver medalist(s)
Hederson Estefani; Hugo de Sousa; Pedro Luiz Burmann; Wagner Cardoso; Jonathan da Silva	4 × 400 m relay	3:01.66	4 q	—N/a		3:01.18	4

Field events

Athlete	Event	Qualification		Final	
Athlete	Event	Distance	Position	Distance	Position
Talles Silva	High jump	—N/a		2.20	9
Fernando Ferreira	High jump	—N/a		2.20	7
Thiago Braz da Silva	Pole vault	—N/a		NM	
Fábio Gomes da Silva	Pole vault	—N/a		NM	
Higor Alves	Long jump	7.86	5	7.60	10
Alexsandro de Melo	Long jump	7.51	14	Did not advance	
Jean Rosa	Triple jump	—N/a		15.79	15
Jefferson Sabino	Triple jump	—N/a		16.43	5
Darlan Romani	Shot put	—N/a		19.74	6
Ronald Julião	Discus throw	—N/a		64.65	2nd place, silver medalist(s)
Wagner Domingos	Hammer throw	—N/a		73.74	4
Allan Wolski	Hammer throw	—N/a		72.72	5
Júlio César de Oliveira	Javelin throw	—N/a		80.94	3rd place, bronze medalist(s)

Combined events – Decathlon

Athlete	Event	100 m	LJ	SP	HJ	400 m	110H	DT	PV	JT	1500 m	Final	Rank
Luiz Alberto de Araújo	Result	10.81	7.53	15.16	2.00	49.91	14.29	46.16	4.70	36.36	4:39.77	8179 SB	3rd place, bronze medalist(s)
Luiz Alberto de Araújo	Points	903	942	800	803	819	937	791	819	683	682	8179 SB	3rd place, bronze medalist(s)
Felipe Vinicius dos Santos	Result	10.81	7.53	15.16	2.00	49.91	14.29	46.16	4.70	56.36	4:39.77	7453 PB	4
Felipe Vinicius dos Santos	Points	903	942	800	803	819	937	791	819	683	682	7453 PB	4

Women
Track & road events

Athlete	Event	Heat		Quarterfinal		Semifinal		Final	
Athlete	Event	Result	Rank	Result	Rank	Result	Rank	Result	Rank
Ana Cláudia Lemos	100 m	10.96	2	Bye	Bye	11.10	6	11.15	7
Rosângela Santos	100 m	11.08	5	Bye	Bye	11.01	2	11.04	4
Ana Cláudia Lemos	200 m	Bye	Bye	Bye	Bye	37.60	Did not advance		
Vitoria Cristina Rosa	200 m	Bye	Bye	23.36	8	23.14	14	Did not advance	
Geisa Coutinho	400 m	Bye	Bye	Bye	Bye	52.40	4	52.05	6
Joelma Sousa	400 m	DNF	DNF	Did not advance					
Flávia de Lima	800 m	Bye	Bye	Bye	Bye	2:02.39	1	2:00.40	3rd place, bronze medalist(s)
Érika Machado	800 m	Bye	Bye	Bye	Bye	2:06.44	9	Did not advance	
Flávia de Lima	1500 m	Bye	Bye	Bye	Bye	Bye	Bye	4:16.53	9
Kleidiane Jardim	1500 m	Bye	Bye	Bye	Bye	Bye	Bye	4:24.86	9
Juliana Paula dos Santos	5000 m	—N/a						15:45.97	1st place, gold medalist(s)
Tatiele de Carvalho	5000 m	—N/a						16:27.09	10
Tatiele de Carvalho	10,000 m	—N/a						33:24.33	8
Juliana Paula dos Santos	3000 m steeplechase	—N/a						DNF	DNF
Tatiane da Silva	3000 m steeplechase	—N/a						10:10.73	6
Adelly Santos	100 m hurdles	Bye	Bye	Bye	Bye	13.08	8	Did not advance	
Fabiana Moraes	100 m hurdles	Bye	Bye	Bye	Bye	13.28	14	Did not advance	
Liliane Fernandes	400 m hurdles	Bye	Bye						
Jailma de Lima	400 m hurdles	Bye	Bye	58.72	11	Did not advance			
Érica de Sena	20 km walk	—N/a						1:30:03	2nd place, silver medalist(s)
Cisiane Lopes	20 km walk	—N/a						1:38:53	11
Adriana Aparecida da Silva	Marathon	—N/a						2:35:40	1st place, gold medalist(s)
Marily dos Santos	Marathon	—N/a						2:41:31	5
Ana Cláudia Lemos; Rosângela Santos; Vitoria Cristina Rosa; Vanusa dos Santos; Bruna Farias; Franciela Krasucki	4 × 100 m relay	43.24	4	—N/a				43.01	4
Geisa Coutinho; Joelma Sousa; Jailma de Lima; Liliane Fernandes; Aline dos Santos	4 × 400 m relay	3:34.97	10	—N/a				Did not advance	

Field events

Athlete	Event	Qualification		Final	
Athlete	Event	Distance	Position	Distance	Position
Mônica de Freitas	High jump	Bye	Bye	1.75	14
Ana Paula de Oliveira	High jump	Bye	Bye	1.80	11
Fabiana Murer	Pole vault	Bye	Bye	4.80	2nd place, silver medalist(s)
Karla Rosa da Silva	Pole vault	Bye	Bye	4.15	7
Keila Costa	Long jump	Bye	Bye	14.50	2nd place, silver medalist(s)
Nubia Soares	Long jump	Bye	Bye	13.57	11
Keila Costa	Triple jump	Bye	Bye	6.41	9
Eliane Martins	Triple jump	Bye	Bye	6.40	10
Geisa Arcanjo	Shot put	Bye	Bye	17.18	9
Andressa de Morais	Discus throw	—N/a		58.08	6
Fernanda Martins	Discus throw	—N/a		60.50	4
Jucilene de Lima	Javelin throw	—N/a		60,42	3rd place, bronze medalist(s)
Laila Domingos	Javelin throw	—N/a		58,19	4

Combined events

Heptathlon	Event	Tamara de Sousa			Vanessa Spínola		
Heptathlon	Event	Results	Points	Rank	Results	Points	Rank
	110 m hurdles	14.03	974	3	14.33	932	7
	High jump	1.77	941	4	1.68	830	8
	Shot put	14.32	815	2	13.94	790	4
	200 m	25.18	870	4	24.00	981	2
	Long jump	5.65	744	9	5.83	798	8
	Javelin throw	46.96	801	3	42.38	713	4
	800 m	2:39.83	575	10	2:20.81	813	6
Final			5542	10		6035	3rd place, bronze medalist(s)

== Badminton ==
Brazil qualified a full team of eight athletes (four men and four women).

Men

Athlete	Event	First round	Second round	Third round	Quarterfinals	Semifinals	Final	Rank
Athlete	Event	Opposition Result	Opposition Result	Opposition Result	Opposition Result	Opposition Result	Opposition Result	Rank
Alex Tjong	Singles	Bye	Cuba (PER); L 0–2	Did not advance				
Daniel Paiola	Singles	Bye	Martínez (CUB); W 2–0	Ramírez (GUA); W 2–0	Shu (USA); L 1–2	Did not advance		
Ygor Coelho	Singles	Bye	Diaz (ARG); W 2–1	Castillo (MEX); W 2–0	Cordón (GUA); L 0–2	Did not advance		
Hugo Arthuso; Daniel Paiola	Men's doubles	—N/a		Corpancho / Guevara (PER); W 2–0	Ramírez / Solis (GUA); W 2–0	Cabrera / Javier (DOM); W 2–0	Chew / Pongnairat (USA); L0-2	2nd place, silver medalist(s)
Ygor Coelho; Alex Tjong	Men's doubles	—N/a		Cuba / del Valle (PER); L 1–2	Did not advance			

Women

Athlete	Event	First round	Second round	Third round	Quarterfinals	Semifinals	Final	Rank
Athlete	Event	Opposition Result	Opposition Result	Opposition Result	Opposition Result	Opposition Result	Opposition Result	Rank
Lohaynny Vicente	Singles	Bye	Azcuy Perez (CUB); W 2–0	Chou (CHI); W 2–0	Li (CAN); L 1–2	Did not advance		
Luana Vicente	Singles	Bye	Macaya (CHI); W 2–0	Wang (USA); L 0–2	Did not advance			
Fabiana Silva	Singles	Bye	Tjitrodipo (SUR); W 2–0	Ugalde (MEX); W 2–0	Honderich (CAN); L 0–2	Did not advance		
Lohaynny Vicente; Luana Vicente	Women's doubles	—N/a		Bye	Polanco / Saturria (DOM); W 2–0	Bruce / Chan (CAN)W 2–0	Lee / Obanana (USA); L 0–2	2nd place, silver medalist(s)
Paula Pereira; Fabiana Silva	Women's doubles	—N/a		Gaitan / González (MEX); L 1–2	Did not advance			

Mixed

Athlete	Event	First round	Second round	Quarterfinals	Semifinals	Final	Rank
Athlete	Event	Opposition Result	Opposition Result	Opposition Result	Opposition Result	Opposition Result	Rank
Alex Tjong; Lohaynny Vicente	Mixed doubles	Humblers / Sotomayor (GUA); W 2–0	H Shu / E Lee (USA); W 2–0	G Henry / K Wynter (JAM); W 2–0	T Ng / A Bruce (CAN); L 0–2	Did not advance	3rd place, bronze medalist(s)
Hugo Arthuso; Fabiana Silva	Mixed doubles	Muñoz / González (MEX); L 1–2	Did not advance				

== Basketball ==
Brazil has qualified a men's and women's teams. Each team will consist of 12 athletes, for a total of 24.

=== Men ===
The Brazil men's national basketball team roster for the 2015 Pan American Games.

Brazil men's national basketball team – 2015 Pan American Games roster
Players
Coaches

Pos.	No.	Name	Age – Date of birth	Height	Club
G	4	Fischer, Ricardo	24 – 16 May 1991	1.83 m (6 ft 0 in)	(Brazil) Bauru
G	5	Freire Luz, Rafael	23 – 11 Feb 1992	1.88 m (6 ft 2 in)	(Spain) Obradoiro
C	6	Lima, Augusto	23 – 17 Sep 1991	2.08 m (6 ft 10 in)	(Spain) UCAM Murcia
G	7	Taylor, Larry	34 – 3 Oct 1980	1.85 m (6 ft 1 in)	(Brazil) Mogi das Cruzes
F	8	Benite, Vítor	25 – 20 Feb 1990	1.90 m (6 ft 3 in)	(Brazil) CR Flamengo
F	10	Nascimento, Carlos	32 – 18 Apr 1983	2.03 m (6 ft 8 in)	(Brazil) CR Flamengo
C	11	Hettsheimeir, Rafael	29 – 16 Jun 1986	2.08 m (6 ft 10 in)	(Brazil) Bauru
C	12	Souza, Rafael	27 – 3 Jun 1988	2.09 m (6 ft 10 in)	(Brazil) Limeira
C	13	Batista, Joao Paulo	33 – 29 Oct 1981	2.05 m (6 ft 9 in)	(Brazil) CR Flamengo
F	14	Meindl, Leonardo	22 – 20 Mar 1993	2.00 m (6 ft 7 in)	(Brazil) Bauru
F	15	Toledo, Marcus	29 – 10 Jul 1986	2.03 m (6 ft 8 in)	(Brazil) Basquete Cearense

Head coach

- Magnano, Ruben

Assistant coach(es)

- Ferraciu, Demetrius
- Neto, Jose

Legend

- Age – as of 16 July 2015
- Club – before start of Games

Group A

Team	Pld	W	L	PF	PA	PD	Pts	Qualification
Brazil	3	3	0	264	206	+58	6	Qualified for the semifinals
United States	3	2	1	270	225	+45	5	Qualified for the semifinals
Puerto Rico	3	1	2	218	266	−48	4	
Venezuela	3	0	3	198	253	−55	3	

21 July 2015
10:30

Report

Brazil	92–59	Puerto Rico
Scoring by quarter: 31–6, 29–11, 19–25, 13–17
Pts: Hettsheimeir 19; Rebs: Batista 11; Asts: Lima 6		Pts: Clavell, De Jesús 8 Rebs: Villafañe, Young, Collier 4 Asts: Young 3

Ryerson Athletic Centre, Toronto

22 July 2015
13:30

Report

Venezuela	64–79	Brazil
Scoring by quarter: 9–22, 14–15, 20–17, 21–25
Pts: Cox, Colmenares 16; Rebs: Vargas Diaz 4 Asts: Vargas 3		Pts: Benite 14; Rebs: Lima 8 Asts: Luz 4

Ryerson Athletic Centre, Toronto

23 July 2015
21:00

Report

United States	83–93	Brazil
Scoring by quarter: 17–24, 21–23, 19–28, 26–18
Pts: Langford 17; Rebs: Prince, Tarczewski 5 Asts: Brown 2		Pts: Benite 34; Rebs: Lima 8 Asts: Batista, Luz, Meindl 3

Ryerson Athletic Centre, Toronto

24 July 2015
13:30

Report

Brazil	68–62	Dominican Republic
Scoring by quarter: 18–12, 17–17, 15–21, 18–12
Pts: Benite 18; Rebs: Lima 11; Asts: Lima, Batista 2		Pts: Stokley 15; Rebs: Santana 9 Asts: Feliz 3

Ryerson Athletic Centre, Toronto

25 July 2015
16:30

Report

(gold) Brazil	86–71	Canada (silver)
Scoring by quarter: 26–13, 22–16, 19–25, 19–17
Pts: Lima, Taylor, Hettsheimeir 13; Rebs: Luz 7 Asts: Luz, Benite 7		Pts: Bennett 18; Rebs: Bennett 9 Asts: Doornekamp 4

Ryerson Athletic Centre, Toronto

=== Women ===
The Brazil national team roster for the women's basketball tournament of the 2015 Pan American Games. The final 12 player squad was announced on May 25, 2015.

Brazil women's national basketball team – 2015 Pan American Games roster
Players
Coaches

Pos.	No.	Name	Age – Date of birth	Height	Club
G/F	4	Sangalli, Izabella	20 – Mar 31, 1995	1.79 m (5 ft 10 in)	(Brazil) ADCF Unimed Americana
G	5	Costa, Débora	23 – Aug 12, 1991	1.63 m (5 ft 4 in)	(Brazil) Uninassau America BK
G	6	Carcavalli, Tássia	23 – May 31, 1992	1.77 m (5 ft 10 in)	(Brazil) BK Santo Andre
G	7	Teixeira, Patrícia	24 – Sep 28, 1990	1.75 m (5 ft 9 in)	(Brazil) São José Desportivo
G	8	Paixão, Tainá	23 – Nov 29, 1991	1.71 m (5 ft 7 in)	(Brazil) Uninassau America BK
G	9	de Paula, Jaqueline	29 – Feb 17, 1986	1.76 m (5 ft 9 in)	(Brazil) BK Santo Andre
C	10	Justino, Gilmara	34 – Mar 13, 1981	1.82 m (6 ft 0 in)	(Brazil) ADCF Unimed Americana
G	11	Martins, Carina	23 – Feb 17, 1992	1.70 m (5 ft 7 in)	(Brazil) ADC São Bernardo
F	12	Jacob, Karina	30 – May 24, 1985	1.84 m (6 ft 0 in)	(Brazil) São José Desportivo
F	13	Caetano, Fabiana	24 – Jan 18, 1991	1.92 m (6 ft 4 in)	(Brazil) Uninassau America BK
F	14	Macedo, Isabela	21 – Jan 23, 1994	1.76 m (5 ft 9 in)	(Brazil) São José Desportivo
C	15	Santos, Kelly	35 – Nov 10, 1979	1.91 m (6 ft 3 in)	(Brazil) Sport Club do Recife

Head coach

- Luiz Augusto Zanon

Assistant coach(es)

- Julio Cesar Patricio
- Cristiano Cedra

Legend

- Age – as of 15 July 2015
- Club – before start of Games

Group A

Team	Pld	W	L	PF	PA	PD	Pts	Qualification
United States	3	3	0	262	201	+61	6	Qualified for the semifinals
Brazil	3	2	1	204	186	+18	5	Qualified for the semifinals
Puerto Rico	3	1	2	210	209	+1	4	
Dominican Republic	3	0	3	163	243	−80	3	

16 July 2015
21:00

Report

United States	75–69	Brazil
Scoring by quarter: 25–17, 14–14, 18–19, 18–19
Pts: Stewart 26; Rebs: Stewart 12; Asts: Jefferson 3		Pts: Teixeira 18; Rebs: Santos 11; Asts: Teixeira 2

Ryerson Athletic Centre, Toronto

17 July 2015
13:30

Report

Puerto Rico	57–62	Brazil
Scoring by quarter: 14–20, 12–11, 14–15, 17–16
Pts: Cortijo Sanchez 20; Rebs: Bermudez 7 Asts: Cortijo Sanchez 2		Pts: de Paula 13; Rebs: Jacob 10; Asts: Teixeira, Santos 2

Ryerson Athletic Centre, Toronto

18 July 2015
13:30

Report

Brazil	73–54	Dominican Republic
Scoring by quarter: 24–10, 19–12, 15–17, 15–15
Pts: de Paula, Justino 17; Rebs: Carcavalli, Justino, Macedo 5 Asts: Carcavalli 4		Pts: Monsac 17; Rebs: Martinez, Andujar 6 Asts: Martinez 3

Ryerson Athletic Centre, Toronto

19 July 2015
18:00

Report

Brazil	63–91	Canada
Scoring by quarter: 9–22, 12–13, 18–33, 24–23
Pts: Macedo 16; Rebs: Macedo 11; Asts: Costa 4		Pts: Fields 15; Rebs: K Plouffe 10; Asts: Thorburn 8

Ryerson Athletic Centre, Toronto

20 July 2015
16:00

Report

(bronze) Cuba	66–62	Brazil
Scoring by quarter: 14–16, 23–16, 12–16, 17–14
Pts: Casanova 18; Rebs: Noblet 14; Asts: Casanova 4		Pts: Paixão 16; Rebs: Santos 7 Asts: Paixão 4

Ryerson Athletic Centre, Toronto

== Beach Volleyball ==
Brazil has qualified a men's and women's pair for a total of four athletes.

Athlete	Event	Preliminary round			Quarterfinals	Semifinals	Finals	
Athlete	Event	Opposition Score	Opposition Score	Opposition Score	Opposition Score	Opposition Score	Opposition Score	Rank
Álvaro Morais Filho; Vitor Gonçalves Felipe	Men's	Daniel – de Cuba (ARU)W2-0	Henríquez – Villafañe (VEN)W2-1	Ontiveros – Virgen (MEX)W2-0	Cairus–Vieyto (URU)W2-0	Diaz–González (CUB)W2-0	Ontiveros – Virgen (MEX)L0-2	2nd place, silver medalist(s)
Liliane Maestrini; Carolina Horta	Women's	Machado – Rodríguez (NIC)W2-0	Mardones – Rivas (CHI)W2-0	Alfaro – Cope (CRC)W2-1	Gomez–Nieto (URU)W2-1	Gallay–Klug (ARG)L0-2	Bronze medal match: Humana-Paredes–Pischke (CAN)W2-0	3rd place, bronze medalist(s)

== Bowling ==
Brazil has qualified 4 athletes (2 men and 2 women).

Singles

Athlete	Event	Qualification															Eighth Finals	Quarterfinals	Semifinals	Finals	
Athlete	Event	Block 1 (Games 1–6)						Block 2 (Games 7–12)						Total	Average	Rank	Eighth Finals	Quarterfinals	Semifinals	Finals	
Athlete	Event	1	2	3	4	5	6	7	8	9	10	11	12	Total	Average	Rank	Opposition Scores	Opposition Scores	Opposition Scores	Opposition Scores	Rank
Marcelo Suartz	Men's	216	199	183	224	227	184	216	247	201	221	248	245	2611	217.6	4	Bye	4486 2nd	Devin Bidwell (USA) W 202–182	MONACELLI Amleto (VEN) W 201–189	1st place, gold medalist(s)
Charles Robini	Men's	188	193	154	207	249	203	169	185	218	213	245	180	2404	200.3	14	Did not advance				
Roberta Rodrigues	Women's	190	183	195	244	175	197	237	164	164	217	185	177	2328	194.0	17	Did not advance				
Stephanie Martins	Women's	182	153	156	226	204	234	181	181	189	190	212	210	2318	193.2	19	Did not advance				

Pairs

Athlete	Event	Block 1 (Games 1–6)								Block 2 (Games 7–12)								Grand Total	Final Rank
Athlete	Event	1	2	3	4	5	6	Total	Average	7	8	9	10	11	12	Total	Average	Grand Total	Final Rank
Charles Robini; Marcelo Suartz	Men's	218	195	258	209	194	162	1148	191.3	150	189	237	254	208	255	2529	210.8	4926	9
Charles Robini; Marcelo Suartz	Men's	203	161	194	177	200	213	1236	206.0	201	216	210	224	213	185	2397	199.8	4926	9
Roberta Rodrigues; Stephanie Martins	Women's	197	198	168	171	191	171	1096	182.7	235	201	209	213	160	179	2293	191.1	4533	11
Roberta Rodrigues; Stephanie Martins	Women's	214	171	215	175	192	157	1124	187.3	156	177	182	206	201	194	2240	186.7	4533	11

== Boxing ==
Brazil has qualified seven male boxers in the 52 kg, 56 kg, 64 kg, 69 kg, 81 kg, 91 kg and +91 kg men's categories and one female boxer in the 75 kg women's category.

Men

Athlete	Event	Preliminaries	Quarterfinals	Semifinals	Final
Athlete	Event	Opposition Result	Opposition Result	Opposition Result	Opposition Result
Julião Neto	Flyweight	Eddi Valenzuela (GUA)L 1 – 2	Did not advance		
Carlos Rocha	Bantamweight	Juan Reyes Donis (GUA); W 2 – 1	Andy Cruz (CUB)L 0 – 3	Did not advance	
Joedison de Jesus	Light welterweight	Bye	Raul CURIEL (MEX)W 3 – 0	Yasniel Toledo (CUB)L 0 – 3	3rd place, bronze medalist(s)
Roberto Custódio	Welterweight	Sasan HAGHIGHAT-JOO (CAN)W 2 – 1	Gabriel Maestre Perez (VEN)L 0 – 3	Did not advance	
Michel Borges	Light heavyweight	Steven NELSON (USA) W 2 – 1	Albert Ramirez Durán (VEN)L 0 – 3	Did not advance	
Juan Nogueira	Heavyweight	Bye	Sammy ELMAIS (CAN); L 1 – 2	Did not advance	
Rafael Lima	Super heavyweight	Bye	Clayton Laurent (ISV) W 2- 1	Edgar Muñoz Mata (VEN) L 1 – 2	3rd place, bronze medalist(s)

Women

Athlete	Event	Quarterfinals	Semifinals	Final
Athlete	Event	Opposition Result	Opposition Result	Opposition Result
Flávia Figueiredo	Light heavyweight	Claressa Shields (USA)L 0 – 3	Did not advance	

== Canoeing ==
=== Slalom ===
Brazil has qualified five boats and five athletes, 4 men and 1 women:

Athlete(s)	Event	Preliminary						Semifinal		Final	
Athlete(s)	Event	Run 1	Rank	Run 2	Rank	Best	Rank	Time	Rank	Time	Rank
Felipe Borges	Men's C-1	95.30	3	94.95	4	123.79	dns	123.79	4	98.41	3rd place, bronze medalist(s)
Charles Corrêa; Anderson Oliveira	Men's C-2	97.57	1	DNS	DNS			157.22	4	109.73	2nd place, silver medalist(s)
Pedro da Silva	Men's K-1	83.15	1	135.83	9	88.67	2	88.67	2	89.02	2nd place, silver medalist(s)
Ana Sátila	Women's C-1	110.31	1	DNS	DNS	DNS	DNS	124.32	2	113.01	1st place, gold medalist(s)
Ana Sátila	Women's K-1	94.14	1	112.06	2			101.43	2	97.94	2nd place, silver medalist(s)

=== Sprint ===
Brazil has qualified 14 athletes in the sprint discipline (6 in men's kayak, 5 in women's kayak, 2 in men's canoe and 1 in women's canoe).

Men

- Edson Isaias da Silva
- Erlon Silva
- Hans Mallmann
- Isaquias Queiroz

Athlete	Event	Heats		Semifinals		Final	
Athlete	Event	Time	Rank	Time	Rank	Time	Rank
Edson Isaias da Silva	K-1 200 m	36.401	3			36.239	2nd place, silver medalist(s)
Celso Dias	K-1 1000 m	—N/a				3:48.329	5
Hans Heinrich Mallmann; Edson Isaias da Silva	K-2 200 m	—N/a				34.345	3rd place, bronze medalist(s)
Celso Dias; Vagner Junior Souta	K-2 1000 m	—N/a				3:30.104	3rd place, bronze medalist(s)
Roberto Maehler; Vagner Junior Souta; Celso Dias; Gilvan Ribeiro	K-4 1000 m	—N/a				3m01s869	2nd place, silver medalist(s)
Isaquias Queiroz; Erlon Silva	C-2 1000 m	—N/a				3m47s117	2nd place, silver medalist(s)
Isaquias Queiroz	C-1 200 m	40.189	1	—N/a		39.991	1st place, gold medalist(s)
Isaquias Queiroz	C-1 1000 m	—N/a				4:07.866	1st place, gold medalist(s)

Women

- Beatriz Vergutz
- Valdenice Conceição

Athlete	Event	Heats		Semifinals		Final	
Athlete	Event	Time	Rank	Time	Rank	Time	Rank
Ana Paula Vergutz	K-1 500 m	1:54.909	1	—N/a		2:03.329	3rd place, bronze medalist(s)
Ediléia dos Reis; Mariane da Silva; Ariela Pinto; Ana Paula Vergutz	K-4 500 m	—N/a				1:41.297	5
Valdenice Conceição	C-1 200 m	—N/a				53.143	3rd place, bronze medalist(s)

Qualification Legend: QF = Qualify to final; QS = Qualify to semifinal

== Cycling ==
Brazil has qualified 24 athletes: 14 men and 10 women.

=== BMX ===
Athlete	Event	Qualifying Run 1		Qualifying Run 2		Quarterfinals		Semifinal		Final	
Athlete	Event	Time	Rank	Time	Rank	Points	Rank	Time	Rank	Time	Rank
Renato Rezende	Men	37.410	7th Q	37.308	5th	4 Q	1	45.317	6	Did not advance	
Anderson de Souza Filho	Men	37.340	6th Q	38.042	9th	7 Q	2	36.772	2	37.299	4
Priscilla Carnaval	Women	42.630	8th	Did not advance							
Thaynara Chaves	Women	44.120	11th	Did not advance							

=== Mountain ===
Athlete	Event	Time	Rank
Rubens Valeriano	Men's Cross-country	1:36:37	7
Luiz Henrique Cocuzzi	Men's Cross-country	1:44:49	16
Isabela Lacerda	Women's Cross-country	1:35:46	6
Raiza Goulão	Women's Cross-country	1:35:17	5

=== Road ===
Men

Athlete	Event	Time	Rank
Cristian Egídio da Rosa	Road race		
João Marcelo Gaspar	Road race		
Murilo Affonso	Road race		

Women

Athlete	Event	Time	Rank
Alice de Melo	Road race		
Ana Paula Polegatch	Road race		
Clemilda Silva	Road race		
Janildes Silva	Road race		

=== Track ===
Men

- Armando Camargo
- Endrigo Pereira
- Flávio Cipriano
- Gideoni Monteiro
- Hugo Osteti
- Kacio Freitas
- Thiago Nardin

Athlete	Event	Qualifying		Round of 16	1/8 finals (repechage)	Quarterfinals	Semifinals	Final	
Athlete	Event	Time Speed (km/h)	Rank	Opposition Time Speed	Opposition Time Speed	Opposition Time Speed	Opposition Time Speed	Opposition Time Speed	Rank
Flavio Cipriano	Men's sprint	10.188	8th	James David Watkins (USA); L 10.549	Did not advance				
Armando Camargo Filho; Tiago Nardin; Robson Dias; Luiz Carlos Tavarez	Men's team pursuit	4:14.634	6th					Did not advance	
Flávio Cipriano; Kacio Freitas; Hugo Osteti	Road race							3rd place, bronze medalist(s)	
Gideoni Monteiro	Omnium							3rd place, bronze medalist(s)	

Women

- Gabriela Yumi Gomes
- Wellyda Rodrigues

Athlete	Event	Qualifying		Round of 16	Quarterfinals	Semifinals	Final	
Athlete	Event	Time Speed (km/h)	Rank	Opposition Time Speed	Opposition Time Speed	Opposition Time Speed	Opposition Time Speed	Rank
Sumaia Ribeiro	Women's sprint	11.336	4th			Juliana Gaviria (COL); L	Did not advance	
Sumaia Ribeiro; Clemilda Silva	Women's team sprint	DSQ						Did not advance
Uênia de Souza; Clemilda Silva; Janildes Silva	Women's team pursuit	3:37.903	7th			Did not advance		

== Diving ==
Brazil has qualified 8 athletes: 4 men and 4 women.

Men

Athlete(s)	Event	Preliminary		Final	
Athlete(s)	Event	Points	Rank	Points	Rank
César Castro	3 m springboard	404.85 Q	3	411.55	4
Ian Matos	3 m springboard	327.05 R	13	Did not advance	
Hugo Parisi	10 m platform	415.30	7	364.50	8
Jackson Rondinelli	10 m platform	296.80	13	13	Did not advance
César Castro; Ian Matos	3 m synchronized springboard	—N/a		374.61	4
Hugo Parisi; Jackson Rondinelli	10 m synchronized platform	—N/a		ND	6

Women

Athlete(s)	Event	Preliminary		Final	
Athlete(s)	Event	Points	Rank	Points	Rank
Tammy Galera	3 m springboard	232.80 Q	11	247.50	11
Juliana Veloso	3 m springboard	292.80 Q	5	294.30	6
Ingrid Oliveira	10 m platform	266.70 Q	7	329.00	6
Giovanna Pedroso	10 m platform	295.50 Q	6	299.50	7
Tammy Galera; Juliana Veloso	3 m synchronized springboard	—N/a		255.45	4
Ingrid Oliveira; Giovanna Pedroso	10 m synchronized platform	—N/a		291.36	2nd place, silver medalist(s)

== Equestrian ==
Brazil qualified the full quota of riders in all equestrian events (4 in dressage, 4 in eventing and 4 in show jumping).

Dressage

Athlete	Horse	Event	Grand Prix		Grand Prix Special		Grand Prix Freestyle		Final Score	Rank
Athlete	Horse	Event	Score	Rank	Score	Rank	Score	Rank	Final Score	Rank
João Victor Marcari Oliva	Xamã dos Pinhais	Individual	69.184	15	69.211	14	138.395	13	73.275	7
João Paulo dos Santos	Veleiro do TOP	Individual	67.842	19	70.158	11	138.000	15	72.950	9
Leandro Aparecido da Silva	Di Caprio	Individual	69.474	11	69.026	15	138.500	12	73.300	6
Sarah Waddell	Quixote Donelly	Individual	65.632	26	67.184	19	132.816	24		
João Victor Marcari Oliva; João Paulo dos Santos; Leandro Aparecido da Silva; Sarah Waddell	Xamã dos Pinhais; Veleiro do TOP; Di Caprio; Quixote Donelly	Team	206.500	4	—N/a				414.895	3rd place, bronze medalist(s)

Eventing

Athlete	Horse	Event	Dressage		Cross-country		Jumping				Total	
Athlete	Horse	Event	Dressage		Cross-country		Qualifier		Final		Total	
Athlete	Horse	Event	Penalties	Rank	Penalties	Rank	Penalties	Rank	Penalties	Rank	Penalties	Rank
Ruy Fonseca	Tom Bombadill	Individual	38.90	1	0.00	1			4.00	19	42.90	3rd place, bronze medalist(s)
Márcio Jorge	Lissy Mac Maye	Individual	52.20	11	0.00	1			0.00	1	52.20	9
Carlos Parro	Calcourt Landline	Individual	45.60	7	0.00	1			0.00	1	45.60	6
Henrique Pinheiro	LandQuenote	Individual	55.40	17	0.00	1			0.00	1	55.40	11
Ruy Fonseca; Márcio Jorge; Carlos Parro; Henrique Pinheiro	Tom Bombadill; Lissy Mac Mayer; Calcourt Landline; LandQuenote	Team	136.70	3	0.00	1	4.00	2	—N/a		140.70	2nd place, silver medalist(s)

Jumping

Athlete	Horse	Event	Qualification								Final						
Athlete	Horse	Event	Round 1		Round 2			Round 3			Round A		Round B			Total	
Athlete	Horse	Event	Pen.	Rank	Pen.	Total	Rank	Pen.	Total	Rank	Pen.	Rank	Pen.	Total	Rank	Pen.	Rank
Rodrigo Pessoa	Status	Individual	DNS*														
Eduardo Menezes	Quintol	Individual	0	1	1	1	4	0	1	1	4		4	8		8	9
Felipe Amaral	Premiere Carthoes BZ	Individual	0	1	4	4	13	4	8	20	8		4	12		12	11
Marlon Zanotelli	Rock'n Roll Semilly	Individual	4	33	4	8	13	4	12	23	Did not advance					—N/a	
Pedro Veniss	Quabri de L Isle	Individual	0	1	1	4	4	5	5	18th	4		0			4	5th
Rodrigo Pessoa; Eduardo Menezes; Karina Johannpeter; Marlon Zanotelli; Pedro Veniss	Status; Quintol; Casper 150; Rock'n Roll Semilly; Quabri de L Isle	Team	—N/a								6	3	8	14	4	14	4

Legend: * = Did not pass horse inspection

== Fencing ==
Brazil qualified 18 fencers (9 men, 9 women).

Men

Athlete	Event	Pool Round		Round of 16	Quarterfinals	Semifinals	Final / BM	
Athlete	Event	Result	Seed	Opposition Score	Opposition Score	Opposition Score	Opposition Score	Rank
Athos Schwantes	Individual épée	2V-3D	12 Q	Reynier Henrique (CUB) W 14-13	José Dominguez (ARG); L 6 – 15	Did not advance		
Nicolas Ferreira	Individual épée	1V-4D	14 Q	Jason Pryor (USA); L 4 – 15	Did not advance			
Alexandre Camargo	Individual épée							
Athos Schwantes; Nicolas Ferreira; Alexandre Camargo	Team épée	—N/a			Venezuela L 28-45	Did not advance		
Guilherme Toldo	Individual foil	3V-2D	8	Jesus Riano (CUB)W 15 – 8	Alexander Massialas (USA) L 8-15	Did not advance		
Ghislain Perrier	Individual foil	3V-2D	6	Felipe Saucedo (ARG)W 15 – 8	Maxmilien Van Haster (CAN)W 15 – 8	Gerek Meinhardt (USA) L 12-15	Did not advance	3rd place, bronze medalist(s)
Fernando Scavasin	Individual foil							
Guilherme Toldo; Ghislain Perrier; Fernando Scavasin	Team foil	—N/a			Puerto Rico W 45-19	Venezuela W 42-34	United States L 26-45	2nd place, silver medalist(s)
Renzo Agresta	Individual sabre	4 V – 1 D	Q	Jesus Carvalhal (VEN)W 15 – 9	Daryl Homer (USA) W 15 – 12	Josef Polossifakis (CAN) L 12-15	Did not advance	3rd place, bronze medalist(s)
William Zeytounlian	Individual sabre	1 V – 4 D	Q	Daryl Homer (USA); L 8 – 15	Did not advance			
Enrico Pezzi	Individual sabre							
Renzo Agresta; William Zeytounlian; Enrico Pezzi	Team sabre	—N/a			ArgentinaL 42 – 45	Placement 5-8th Chile W 45-41	Placement 5-6th Mexico W 45-38	

Women

Athlete	Event	Pool Round		Round of 16	Quarterfinals	Semifinals	Final / BM	
Athlete	Event	Result	Seed	Opposition Score	Opposition Score	Opposition Score	Opposition Score	Rank
Nathalie Moellhausen	Individual épée	3V-2D	6 Q	Natalia Olarte (COL) 'W'15-4	Eliana Lugo (VEN); W 15-5	Katharine Holmes (USA); L 7-10	Did not advance	3rd place, bronze medalist(s)
Rayssa Costa	Individual épée	4 V – 1 D	3 Q	align=center	Eliana Lugo (VEN); L 4 – 15	Did not advance		
Amanda Netto Simeão	Individual épée							
Nathalie Moellhausen; Rayssa Costa; Amanda Netto Simeão	Team épée	—N/a			Argentina W 45-39	United StatesL 31-32	Bronze medal match: Cuba W 38-29	3rd place, bronze medalist(s)
Ana Bulcão	Individual foil	1 V – 4 D	13th	Kelleigh Ryan (CAN)L 4 – 15	Did not advance			
Gabriela Cécchini	Individual foil	3 V – 2 D	8th	Flavia Mormandi (ARG)W 15-5	Lee Kiefer (USA)L 4 – 15	Did not advance		
Taís Rochel	Individual foil							
Ana Bulcão; Gabriela Cécchini; Taís Rochel	Team foil	—N/a			Chile W 45-19	United States L 26-45	Mexico L 42-43	4th
Karina Lakerbai	Individual sabre	0 V – 5 D	17th	Did not advance				
Giulia Gasparin	Individual sabre	3 V – 2 D	Q	Eilen Greench (PAN); L 4 – 15	Did not advance			
Marta Baeza	Individual sabre							
Karina Lakerbai; Giulia Gasparin; Marta Baeza	Team sabre	—N/a			Mexico L 27 – 45	Placement 5-8th Dominican Republic W 45-41	Placement 5-6th Canada L 38 – 45	

== Field hockey ==
Brazil has qualified a men's team of 16 athletes. Although the country hosts the 2016 Summer Olympics the following year, it does not get an automatic spot for the dispute. In order to qualify, Brazil has to finish 6th place or higher at the Pan Am.

Men

Brazil announced their squad on June 15, 2015.

- André Luiz Couto
- Bruno Paes
- Bruno Mendonça
- Bruno Sousa
- Christopher McPherson
- Lucas Paixão
- Luis Felipe Réus
- Marcos Pasin
- Matheus Ferreira
- Patrick Van der Heijden
- Paul Duncker
- Paulo Roberto Junior
- Rodrigo Faustino
- Stephane Smith
- Thiago Dantas
- Yuri Van der Heijden

Pool B

Pos	Team	Pld	W	D	L	GF	GA	GD	Pts	Qualification
1	Canada (H)	3	3	0	0	18	2	+16	9	Quarter-finals
2	Chile	3	2	0	1	6	4	+2	6	Quarter-finals
3	Brazil	3	1	0	2	3	12	−9	3	Quarter-finals
4	Mexico	3	0	0	3	3	12	−9	0	Quarter-finals

Source: FIH
Rules for classification: 1) points; 2) matches won; 3) goal difference; 4) goals for; 5) head-to-head result.
(H) Hosts

14 July 2015
19:00

Canada	9–1	Brazil
Bissett 8'; Tupper 17'; Pearson 28', 35'; Ho-Garcia 31'; Froese 34'; Guest 39', 44'; Wharton 50'	Report	Borges 9'

Umpires:
Andres Ledesma (ARG)
Francisco Vázquez (ESP)

16 July 2015
17:00

Brazil	1–0	Mexico
Paixao 44'	Report

Umpires:
You Suolong (CHN)
Donny Gobinsingh (TTO)

18 July 2015
17:00

Brazil	1–3	Chile
Borges 42'	Report	N. Renz 11'; Richter 14'; Rodríguez 40'

Umpires:
Saleem Aaron (USA)
Grant Hundley (USA)

21 July 2015
17:00

United States	1–1	Brazil
Sundeen 57'	Report; Penalties	Borges 34'
Penalties
Harris (penalty shoot-out missed); Runzi (penalty shoot-out missed); Linney (penalty shoot-out scored); Cunningham (penalty shoot-out missed)	1–3	(penalty shoot-out scored) Paixão; (penalty shoot-out scored) Y. van der Heijden; (penalty shoot-out scored) Sousa; (penalty shoot-out missed) P. van der Heijden

Umpires:
Federico Garcia (URU)
Gavin Caldecott (CAN)

23 July 2015
19:00

Brazil	0–0	Canada
	Report; Penalties
Penalties
Y. van der Heijden (penalty shoot-out scored); P. van der Heijden (penalty shoot-out scored); Felipe Réus (penalty shoot-out missed); Smith (penalty shoot-out scored)	3–5	(penalty shoot-out scored) Pearson; (penalty shoot-out scored) Noronha-Teixeira; (penalty shoot-out scored) Panesar; (penalty shoot-out scored) Johnston; (penalty shoot-out scored) Froese

Umpires:
Andres Ledesma (ARG)
Saleem Aaron (USA)

25 July 2015
17:00

(bronze) Chile	4–1	Brazil
N. Renz 5', 32'; Kannegiesser 19'; Martín 20'	Report	Smith 60'

Umpires:
Andres Ledesma (ARG)
Grant Hundley (USA)

== Football ==
=== Men ===
Brazil has qualified a men's team.

Squad

- Andrey
- Jacsson
- Bressan
- Luan
- Gustavo Henrique
- Euller
- Gilberto
- Tinga
- Vinícius Freitas
- Bruno Paulista
- Barreto
- Dodô
- Eurico
- Romulo
- Clayton
- Erik Lima
- Lucas Piazon
- Luciano

Group A

Pos	Team	Pld	W	D	L	GF	GA	GD	Pts	Qualification
1	Brazil	3	2	1	0	11	4	+7	7	Medal round
2	Panama	3	1	2	0	5	4	+1	5	Medal round
3	Peru	3	1	0	2	3	6	−3	3	
4	Canada (H)	3	0	1	2	1	6	−5	1	

Source: Toronto 2015
(H) Hosts
July 12, 2015
20:35

Canada	1–4	Brazil
Babouli 58'	Report	Luciano 7'; Rômulo 38'; Clayton 47'; Erik 89'

Hamilton Pan Am Soccer Stadium, Hamilton
Referee: José Peñaloza (Mexico)

July 16, 2015
17:35

Peru	0–4	Brazil
	Report	Luan 3'; Clayton 20'; Rômulo 26'; Dodô 30'

Hamilton Pan Am Soccer Stadium, Hamilton
Referee: Raúl Castro (Honduras)

July 20, 2015
17:35

Brazil	3–3	Panama
Luciano 24', 25'; Clayton 37'	Report	Aguilar 40', 51'; Escobar 56' (pen.)

Hamilton Pan Am Soccer Stadium, Hamilton
Referee: José Peñaloza (Mexico)

July 23, 2015
17:35

Brazil	1–2	Uruguay
Clayton 75'	Report	Schettino 86'; Santos 87'

Hamilton Pan Am Soccer Stadium, Hamilton
Referee: José Peñaloza (Mexico)

July 25, 2015
13:05

Brazil	3–1 (a.e.t.)	Panama
Luciano 76' (pen.), 115' (pen.); Lucas Piazon 99'	Report	Núñez 45+2'

Hamilton Pan Am Soccer Stadium, Hamilton
Referee: Valdin Legister (Jamaica)

=== Women ===
Brazil has qualified a women's team of 18 athletes.

Squad

- Andressa Alves
- Andressa Machry
- Bárbara
- Cristiane
- Darlene
- Érika
- Fabiana
- Gabi Zanotti
- Luciana
- Maurine
- Formiga
- Mônica
- Poliana
- Rafinha
- Rafaelle
- Raquel
- Tamires
- Thaisa

Group B

Pos	Team	Pld	W	D	L	GF	GA	GD	Pts	Qualification
1	Brazil	3	3	0	0	12	1	+11	9	Medal round
2	Canada (H)	3	1	0	2	5	6	−1	3	Medal round
3	Costa Rica	3	1	0	2	2	5	−3	3	
4	Ecuador	3	1	0	2	5	12	−7	3	

Source: Toronto 2015
(H) Hosts
July 11, 2015
18:05

Costa Rica	0–3	Brazil
	Report	Raquel 14'; Thaisa 34'; Formiga 90'

Hamilton Pan Am Soccer Stadium, Hamilton
Referee: Ekaterina Koroleva (United States)

July 15, 2015
17:35

Brazil	7–1	Ecuador
Monica 17'; Cristiane 44', 55', 67', 70', 78'; Maurine 84'	Report	Pesántes 5'

Hamilton Pan Am Soccer Stadium, Hamilton
Referee: Gillian Martindale (Barbados)

July 19, 2015
20:35

Canada	0–2	Brazil
	Report	Alves 55'; Cristiane 87'

Hamilton Pan Am Soccer Stadium, Hamilton
Referee: Ekaterina Koroleva (United States)

July 22, 2015
17:35

Brazil	4–2	Mexico
Cristiane 4'; Rafaelle 45+1', 73'; Romero 46' (o.g.)	Report	Fabiana 25' (o.g.); Rangel 70'

Hamilton Pan Am Soccer Stadium, Hamilton
Referee: Marie-Soleil Beaudoin (Canada)

July 25, 2015
18:35

(gold) Brazil	4–0	Colombia (silver)
Formiga 7'; Maurine 75'; Alves 86'; Fabiana 90+3'	Report

Hamilton Pan Am Soccer Stadium, Hamilton
Referee: Mirian León (El Salvador)

== Golf ==
Brazil qualified two male and two female golfers. The team was named on May 20, 2015.

Player	Event	R1	R2	R3	R4	Total	To par	Place
Adilson da Silva	Men's individual	71	70	73	72	286	−2	8
André Tourinho	Men's individual	70	74	70	72	286	−2	8
Luiza Altmann	Women's individual	DQ	77	76	76	–	–	DQ
Clara Teixeira	Women's individual	82	82	87	82	333	+45	28
Clara Teixeira; Luiza Altmann; André Tourinho; Adilson da Silva	Mixed team	152	147	146	148	593	+17	9

== Gymnastics ==
Brazil has qualified 20 gymnasts.

=== Artistic ===
Brazil qualified 10 athletes. The men's team was named on June 26 and the women's team on June 30, 2015.

Men
Team & Individual Qualification

Athlete	Event	Final							
Athlete	Event	Apparatus						Total	Rank
Athlete	Event	F	PH	R	V	PB	HB	Total	Rank
Arthur Mariano	Qualification	14.250 (9)Q	14.300 (9)	—N/a	14.900 (3)Q	14.350 (14)	15.000 (6)Q	73.000	27
Arthur Zanetti	Qualification	13.900 (15)	—N/a	15.800 (1)Q	14.750 (11)	—N/a	—N/a	44.450	46
Caio Souza	Qualification	13.650 (21)	13.750 (16)	14.600 (15)	15.200 (1)Q	15.450 (4)Q	14.500 (13)	87.200	5
Francisco Júnior	Qualification	—N/a	14.450 (6)Q	14.350 (18)	—N/a	14.750(6)Q	14.150(18)	57.700	40
Lucas Bitencourt	Qualification	12.650 (34)	14.800 (8)Q	14.650 (14)	—N/a	13.900(24)	14.700(8)Q	85.250	7
Total	Team							264.050	2nd place, silver medalist(s)

- Petrix Barbosa (reserve)

Qualification Legend: Q = Qualified to apparatus final

Individual Finals

Athlete	Event	Final							
Athlete	Event	Vault	Floor	Pommel horse	Rings	Parallel bars	Horizontal bar	Total	Rank
Arthur Mariano	Individual Floor		14.700					14.700	5th
Arthur Mariano	Individual Vault	14.087						14.087	7th
Arthur Mariano	Individual Horizontal Bar						14.025	14.025	8th
Arthur Zanetti	Individual Rings				15.600			15.600	1st place, gold medalist(s)
Caio Souza	Individual All-around	14.950	14.400	14.600	15.000	15.250	14.650	88.850	4th
Caio Souza	Individual Parallel Bars					13.725		13.725	7th
Caio Souza	Individual Vault	14.925						14.925	3rd place, bronze medalist(s)
Francisco Júnior	Individual Parallel Bars					12.600		12.600	8th
Francisco Júnior	Individual Pommel Horse			14.450				14.450	6th
Lucas Bitencourt	Individual All-around	12.850	14.350	14.350	14.950	13.650	12.650	82.750	9th
Lucas Bitencourt	Individual Horizontal Bar						14.025	14.025	8th
Lucas Bitencourt	Individual Pommel Horse			12.825				12.825	8th

Women
Team & Individual Qualification

Athlete	Event	Final					
Athlete	Event	Apparatus				Total	Rank
Athlete	Event	F	V	UB	BB	Total	Rank
Daniele Hypólito	Qualification	14.300	13.050	14.150	13.300	54.800	8 Q
Flávia Saraiva	Qualification	14.200	14.150	13.450	14.550	56.350	4 Q
Julie Kim Sinmon	Qualification	—N/a	—N/a	—N/a	—N/a	13.750	54
Letícia Costa	Qualification	12.850	14.150	12.450	n/a	39.450	32
Lorrane dos Santos	Qualification	12.050	14.750	12.900	12.100	51.800	12
Total	Team	41.200	43.200	39.400	41.600	165.400	3rd place, bronze medalist(s)

- Jade Barbosa (reserve)

Qualification Legend: Q = Qualified to apparatus final

Individual Finals

Athlete	Event	Final					
Athlete	Event	Vault	Floor	Balance Beam	Uneven bars	Total	Rank
Daniele Hypólito	Individual All-around	14.100	13.950	14.050	13.150	55.250	5th
Daniele Hypólito	Individual Vault	14.062				14.062	4th
Daniele Hypólito	Individual Floor		12.800			12.800	4th
Flávia Saraiva	Individual All-around	14.100	13.950	14.050	13.150	55.250	3rd place, bronze medalist(s)
Flávia Saraiva	Individual Floor		13.200			13.200	6th
Flávia Saraiva	Individual Balance Beam			13.225		13.225	5th
Julie Kim Simons	Individual Balance Beam			13.575		13.575	4th

=== Rhythmic ===
Brazil has qualified a full team of eight gymnasts (six in group and two in individual).

Individual

Athlete	Event	Final					
Athlete	Event	Hoop	Ball	Clubs	Ribbon	Total	Rank
Angélica Kvieczynski	Individual	15.100 (4)Q	15.500 (2)Q	14.200 (6)Q	15.375 (2)Q	60.175	4th
Angélica Kvieczynski	Hoop	15.358				15.358	3rd place, bronze medalist(s)
Angélica Kvieczynski	Ball		14.633			14.633	6th
Angélica Kvieczynski	Clubs			15.267		15.267	5th
Angélica Kvieczynski	Ribbon				15.633	15.633	3rd place, bronze medalist(s)
Natália Gaudio	Individual	15.300 (2)Q	12.900(10)	13.733 (8)Q	13.983 (8)Q	60.175	8th
Natália Gaudio	Hoop	14.975				14.975	4th
Natália Gaudio	Ribbon				13.517	13.517	8th

Qualification Legend: Q = Qualified to apparatus final

Group

Athletes	Event	Final			
Athletes	Event	5 Ribbons	6 Clubs & 2 Hoops	Total	Rank
Ana Paula Ribeiro; Beatriz Francisco; Dayane Amaral; Débora Falda; Emanuelle Lopes e Lima; Jessica Maier	Group all-around	14.800 (1)	15.433(1)	30.233	1st place, gold medalist(s)
Ana Paula Ribeiro; Beatriz Francisco; Dayane Amaral; Débora Falda; Emanuelle Lopes e Lima; Jessica Maier	Group 5 ribbons	14.800 (1)	—N/a	15.000	1st place, gold medalist(s)
Ana Paula Ribeiro; Beatriz Francisco; Dayane Amaral; Débora Falda; Emanuelle Lopes e Lima; Jessica Maier	Group 6 clubs + 2 hoops	—N/a	15.433(1)	14.692	2nd place, silver medalist(s)

== Handball ==
Brazil has qualified a men's and women's teams. Each team will consist of 15 athletes, for a total of 30.

=== Men ===
Brazil announced their squad on June 1, 2015.

Head coach: (Spain) Jordi Ribera

No.	Pos.	Name	Date of birth (age)	Height	App.	Goals	Club
1	GK	Maik Santos	6 September 1980 (age 45)	1.80 m			(Brazil) Taubaté
2	CB	Henrique Teixeira	27 February 1989 (age 37)	1.92 m	66	102	(Brazil) Taubaté
3	RB	Fernando Pacheco Filho	25 May 1983 (age 43)	1.90 m	148	455	(Brazil) Taubaté
5	CB	Bruno Santana	27 February 1982 (age 44)	1.85 m	24	40	(Brazil) São Caetano do Sul
8	LB	Raul Nantes	20 March 1990 (age 36)	1.94 m	20		(France) Billere Handball
9	RW	Lucas Cândido	19 March 1989 (age 37)	1.82 m	30	60	(Brazil) Taubaté
13	CB	Diogo Hubner	30 January 1983 (age 43)	1.88 m	55	95	(Brazil) Taubaté
14	LB	Thiagus dos Santos	25 January 1989 (age 37)	1.98 m	74	120	(Spain) Logroño
17	P	Alexandro Pozzer	21 December 1988 (age 37)	1.92 m	37	54	(Spain) Guadalajara
18	LW	Felipe Ribeiro	4 May 1985 (age 41)	1.85 m	169	597	(France) Montpellier
19	RW	Fábio Chiuffa	10 March 1989 (age 37)	1.87 m	76	128	(Spain) Guadalajara
25	P	Vinícius Teixeira	3 April 1988 (age 38)	1.90 m	99	161	(Brazil) Taubaté
26	RB	Oswaldo Guimarães	23 October 1989 (age 36)	1.83 m	32		(Spain) CB Villa de Aranda
33	LW	André Soares	13 February 1984 (age 42)	1.90 m	32		(Brazil) Taubaté
89	GK	César Almeida	6 January 1989 (age 37)	1.87 m	35	0	(Spain) Guadalajara

Group A

Team	Pld	W	D	L	GF	GA	GD	Pts	Qualification
Brazil	3	3	0	0	120	53	+67	6	Qualified for the semifinals
Uruguay	3	2	0	1	77	78	−1	4	Qualified for the semifinals
Canada	3	1	0	2	62	85	−23	2	
Dominican Republic	3	0	0	3	66	109	−43	0	

July 17; 11:30	Brazil	34–17	Canada	Exhibition Centre – Hall B Referees: Ziñiga, Reyes (CUB)
July 17; 11:30	Pacheco 5	(20–8)	Walder 5	Exhibition Centre – Hall B Referees: Ziñiga, Reyes (CUB)
July 17; 11:30	2× (yellow card) 2× (suspension)	report	1× (yellow card) 3× (suspension)	Exhibition Centre – Hall B Referees: Ziñiga, Reyes (CUB)

July 19; 11:30	Uruguay	18–38	Brazil	Exhibition Centre – Hall B Referees: Guzman, Perez (PUR)
July 19; 11:30	Morandeira 5	(11–16)	Pozzer, Chiuffa 5	Exhibition Centre – Hall B Referees: Guzman, Perez (PUR)
July 19; 11:30	3× (yellow card) 2× (suspension)	report	2× (yellow card) 2× (suspension)	Exhibition Centre – Hall B Referees: Guzman, Perez (PUR)

July 21; 13:30	Brazil	48–18	Dominican Republic	Exhibition Centre – Hall B Referees: Guzman, Perez (PUR)
July 21; 13:30	Chiuffa 10	(30–7)	Mateo 7	Exhibition Centre – Hall B Referees: Guzman, Perez (PUR)
July 21; 13:30	2× (yellow card) 2× (suspension)	Report	2× (yellow card) 1× (suspension)	Exhibition Centre – Hall B Referees: Guzman, Perez (PUR)

July 23; 13:30	Brazil	34–24	Chile	Exhibition Centre – Hall B Referees: Gjeding, Hansen (DEN)
July 23; 13:30	Guimarães 5	(15–12)	Salinas 10	Exhibition Centre – Hall B Referees: Gjeding, Hansen (DEN)
July 23; 13:30	2× (yellow card) 5× (suspension)	report	3× (yellow card) 4× (suspension) 1× (red card)	Exhibition Centre – Hall B Referees: Gjeding, Hansen (DEN)

July 25
20:00
(gold) Brazil
29–27 (ET)
Argentina (silver)
Exhibition Centre – Hall B
Referees: Gjeding, Hansen (DEN)
Hubner, Santos 6
(9–11)
Fernandez 8
3× (yellow card) 5× (suspension) 1× (red card)
report
2× (yellow card) 2× (suspension)

FT: 24–24 ET: 5–3

=== Women ===
Brazil announced their squad on June 16, 2015. Fabiana Diniz was ruled out because of a deep vein thrombosis and was replaced by Elaine Gomes.

Head coach: (Denmark) Morten Soubak

No.	Pos.	Name	Date of birth (age)	Height	App.	Goals	Club
3	RW	Alexandra do Nascimento	16 September 1981 (aged 33)	1.77 m	133	502	(Romania) HCM Baia Mare
4	LW	Samira Rocha	26 January 1989 (aged 26)	1.70 m	53	139	(France) OGC Nice
5	P	Daniela Piedade	2 March 1979 (aged 36)	1.73 m	138	265	(Hungary) Siófok KC
6	LB	Amanda de Andrade	20 October 1989 (aged 25)	1.74 m	15	30	(Brazil) Handebol Concórdia
7	P	Tamires Morena Lima	16 May 1994 (aged 21)	1.89 m			(Hungary) Győri Audi ETO KC
8	LW	Fernanda da Silva	25 September 1989 (aged 25)	1.76 m	70	281	(Romania) CSM Bucharest
9	CB	Ana Paula Rodrigues	18 October 1987 (aged 27)	1.72 m	95	427	(Romania) CSM Bucharest
10	RW	Jéssica Quintino	17 April 1991 (aged 24)	1.76 m			(Poland) MKS Lublin
12	GK	Bárbara Arenhart	4 October 1986 (aged 28)	1.82 m	59	1	(Romania) NFH
15	CB	Francielle da Rocha	10 June 1992 (aged 23)	1.66 m			(Austria) Hypo Niederösterreich
16	GK	Mayssa Pessoa	11 June 1984 (aged 31)	1.80 m	38	0	(Romania) CSM Bucharest
19		Elaine Gomes Barbosa	1 June 1992 (aged 23)	1.86 m	1		(Brazil) Guarulhos
33	LB	Jaqueline Anastácio	9 November 1987 (aged 27)	1.75 m			(Germany) SG BBM Bietigheim
60	RW	Célia Coppi	17 April 1980 (aged 35)	1.76 m			(Brazil) Metodista
81	RB	Deonise Cavaleiro	20 June 1983 (aged 32)	1.80 m	105	241	(Romania) CSM Bucharest

Group A

Team	Pld	W	D	L	GF	GA	GD	Pts	Qualification
Brazil	3	3	0	0	120	52	+68	6	Qualified for the Semifinals
Mexico	3	2	0	1	83	86	−3	4	Qualified for the Semifinals
Puerto Rico	3	0	1	2	72	98	−26	1	
Canada	3	0	1	2	55	94	−39	1	

July 16; 11:30	Brazil	38–21	Puerto Rico	Exhibition Centre – Hall B Referees: Paolantoni, Zanikian (ARG)
July 16; 11:30	Nascimento, Silva 7	(15–10)	Ceballos 7	Exhibition Centre – Hall B Referees: Paolantoni, Zanikian (ARG)
July 16; 11:30	3× (yellow card) 2× (suspension)	Report	2× (yellow card) 5× (suspension)	Exhibition Centre – Hall B Referees: Paolantoni, Zanikian (ARG)

July 18; 11:30	Canada	12–48	Brazil	Exhibition Centre – Hall B Referees: Zuñiga, Reyes (CUB)
July 18; 11:30	Routhier 6	(5–26)	Nascimento 9	Exhibition Centre – Hall B Referees: Zuñiga, Reyes (CUB)
July 18; 11:30	2× (yellow card) 2× (suspension)	Report	2× (yellow card) 3× (suspension)	Exhibition Centre – Hall B Referees: Zuñiga, Reyes (CUB)

July 20; 13:30	Brazil	34–19	Mexico	Exhibition Centre – Hall B Referees: Lemes, Sosa (URU)
July 20; 13:30	Nascimento 8	(19–12)	Jaramillo 3	Exhibition Centre – Hall B Referees: Lemes, Sosa (URU)
July 20; 13:30	3× (yellow card) 1× (suspension)	Report	3× (yellow card) 1× (suspension)	Exhibition Centre – Hall B Referees: Lemes, Sosa (URU)

July 22; 13:30	Brazil	40–22	Uruguay	Exhibition Centre – Hall B Referees: Guzman, Perez (PUR)
July 22; 13:30	Silva 8	(18–11)	Scarrone 8	Exhibition Centre – Hall B Referees: Guzman, Perez (PUR)
July 22; 13:30	3× (yellow card) 5× (suspension)	report	3× (yellow card) 2× (suspension)	Exhibition Centre – Hall B Referees: Guzman, Perez (PUR)

July 24; 20:00	(gold) Brazil	25–20	Argentina (silver)	Exhibition Centre – Hall B Referees: Lemes, Sosa (URU)
July 24; 20:00	Nascimento 6	(12–12)	Mendoza, Karsten 5	Exhibition Centre – Hall B Referees: Lemes, Sosa (URU)
July 24; 20:00	3× (yellow card) 5× (suspension)	report	3× (yellow card) 2× (suspension)	Exhibition Centre – Hall B Referees: Lemes, Sosa (URU)

== Judo ==
Brazil has qualified a full team of fourteen judokas (seven men and seven women).

Men

Athlete	Event	Round of 16	Quarterfinals	Semifinals	Repechage	Final / BM	
Athlete	Event	Opposition Result	Opposition Result	Opposition Result	Opposition Result	Opposition Result	Rank
Felipe Kitadai	−60 kg	Bye	(Colombia) John Futtinico W	(Cuba) Yandry Torres MarimonW		(Ecuador) Lenin Preciado L	2nd place, silver medalist(s)
Charles Chibana	−66 kg	Bye	Gustavo Lopez Aguilera (ESA) W	Sergio Mattey (VEN)W		Antoine Bouchard (CAN)W	1st place, gold medalist(s)
Alex Pombo	−73 kg	Bye	Juan Rosa (ESA)W	Alejandro Clara (ARG)L	Arthur Margelidon (CAN)L		
Victor Penalber	−81 kg	Bye	Yusef Farah (MEX)W	Ivan Felipe Silva (CUB)L	Gadiel Miranda (PUR)W		3rd place, bronze medalist(s)
Tiago Camilo	−90 kg	Bye	Rafael Romo (CHI)W	Cristian Schmidt (ARG)W		Asley González (CUB)W	1st place, gold medalist(s)
Luciano Corrêa	−100 kg	Bye	Antony Peña (VEN)W	Hector Campos (ARG)W		Marc Deschenes (CAN)W	1st place, gold medalist(s)
David Moura	+100 kg	Bye	Joshua Santos (VEN)W	Pedro Pineda (ARG)W		Freddy Figueroa (ECU)W	1st place, gold medalist(s)

Women

Athlete	Event	Round of 16	Quarterfinals	Semifinals	Repechage	Final / BM	
Athlete	Event	Opposition Result	Opposition Result	Opposition Result	Opposition Result	Opposition Result	Rank
Nathalia Brigida	−48 kg	Bye	Andrea Gómez (VEN)W	Paula Pareto (ARG)L	Diana Cobos (ECU)W		3rd place, bronze medalist(s)
Érika Miranda	−52 kg	Bye	María García (DOM)W	Diana Díaz (ECU)W		Ecaterina Guica (CAN)W	1st place, gold medalist(s)
Rafaela Silva	−57 kg	Bye	Gabriela Narváez (ARG)W	Catherine Beauchemin-Pinard (CAN)L	Anriquelis Barrios (VEN)W		3rd place, bronze medalist(s)
Mariana Silva	−63 kg	Bye	Andtrea Gutierrez (MEX)W	Stéfanie Tremblay (CAN)L	Diana Velasco (COL)W		3rd place, bronze medalist(s)
Maria Portela	−70 kg	Bye	Elvismar Rodriguez (VEN)W	Kelita Zupancic (CAN)L	Andrea Poo (MEX)W		3rd place, bronze medalist(s)
Mayra Aguiar	−78 kg	Bye	(Mexico) Liliana Cardenas W	(Cuba) Yalennis CastilloW		(United States) Kayla Harrison L	2nd place, silver medalist(s)
Maria Suelen Altheman	+78 kg	Bye	Emileidys López (VEN)W	Vanessa Zambotti (MEX)L	Leidi German (DOM)W		3rd place, bronze medalist(s)

== Karate ==
Brazil has qualified 3 male and 4 female athletes.

Men

Athlete	Event	Round robin				Semifinals	Final	
Athlete	Event	Opposition Result	Opposition Result	Opposition Result	Rank	Opposition Result	Opposition Result	Rank
Douglas Brose	–60 kg	Maximilien Larrosa (URU) W PTS 8:0	Miguel Sofia (CHI) W PTS 3:0	Andrés Rendón (COL) HKW 0:0		Brandis Miyazaki (USA) W PTS 3:0	Jovanni Martinez (VEN)W PTS 4:0	1st place, gold medalist(s)
Marcos Paulo Silva	–84 kg	Miguel Amargos (ARG) L PTS 1:7	Antonio Gutierrez (MEX) L PTS 2:4	Andres Loor (ECU) L PTS 0:1		Did not advance		
Wellington Barbosa	+84 kg	Christopher de Sousa (CAN)L PTS 5–3	Franklin Mina (CUB) L PTS 0–8	Anel Castillo (DOM) HKW 0:0		Did not advance		

Women

Athlete	Event	Round robin				Semifinals	Final	
Athlete	Event	Opposition Result	Opposition Result	Opposition Result	Rank	Opposition Result	Opposition Result	Rank
Aline de Paula	–50 kg	Cecilia Cuellar (MEX) L PTS 1:0	Gabriela Bruna (CHI) W PTS 2:0	Tyler Wolfe (USA) W PTS 2:0		Ana Villanueva (DOM)L PTS 2:0		3rd place, bronze medalist(s)
Valéria Kumizaki	–55 kg	Leide Leon (DOM) HKW 0:0	Genesis Navarrete (VEN) W PTS 4:1	Kate Campbell (CAN) L PTS 0:2		Jessy Reyes (CHI) W PTS 7:0	Kate Campbell (CAN) HKW 1:1	1st place, gold medalist(s)
Natália Brozulatto	–61 kg	Priscila Lazo Nieto (ECU) W PTS 1:0	Carmen Harrigan (DOM) HKW 2:2	Eimi Kurita (USA) W PTS 1:0	1	Omaira Molina (VEN) W PTS 3:1	Xhunashi Caballero (MEX) W PTS 2:0	1st place, gold medalist(s)
Isabela Rodrigues	+68 kg	Karina Perez (DOM) W PTS 7:0	Cirelys Martinez (CUB) W PTS 1:0	Camélie Boisvenue (CAN) W PTS 4:0	1	Valeria Echeverria (ECU) L PTS 5:1		3rd place, bronze medalist(s)

== Modern pentathlon ==
Brazil has qualified 5 athletes, 2 male and 3 female pentathletes.

Athlete	Event	Fencing (Épée One Touch)			Swimming (200m Freestyle)			Riding (Show Jumping)			Shooting/Running (10 m Air Pistol/3000m)			Total Points	Final Rank
Athlete	Event	Results	Rank	MP Points	Time	Rank	MP Points	Penalties	Rank	MP Points	Time	Rank	MP Points	Total Points	Final Rank
Felipe Nascimento	Men's	17V-11D	8	226	2:07.57	13	318	0	6	282	12:41.39	13	539	1365	7
Danilo Fagundes	Men's	15V-13D	11	210	2:09.99	16	313	EL	DSQ	0	12:29.71	11	551	1074	22
Yane Marques	Women's	18V-3D	1	277	2:12.18	1	304	14	10	286	13:41.25	9	479	1348	1st place, gold medalist(s)
Priscila Oliveira	Women's	11V-10D	10	214	2:18.23	7	286	42	17	258	14:25.67	13	435	1193	14
Larissa Lellys	Women's	10-11	205	14	2:17.84	6	287	10	7	290	14:25.67	12	435	1215	13

== Roller sports ==
Figure skating

Brazil has qualified one male and one female figure skater.

Athlete	Event	Short Program		Long Program		Total Score	Final Rank
Athlete	Event	Score	Rank	Score	Rank	Total Score	Final Rank
Marcel Sturmer	Men's free skating	133.40	1	134.20	1	536.00	1st place, gold medalist(s)
Talitha Haas	Women's free skating	118.20	2	126.70	2	498.30	2nd place, silver medalist(s)

== Rowing ==
Brazil has qualified 12 boats and 21 rowers, 16 men and 5 women.

Men

- Ailson Eráclito
- Thiago Pereira Carvalho
- Renato Cataldo
- Thiago Almeida
- Guilherme Gomes
- David Faria
- Diego Nazário
- Emmanuel Dantas
- Pedro Meirelles
- Victor Ruzicki
- Maciel Costa
- Allan Bittencourt
- Leandro Tozzo
- Vinícius Delazeri
- Gabriel Campos
- Maurício Abreu

Athlete	Event	Heats		Repechage		Final	
Athlete	Event	Time	Rank	Time	Rank	Time	Rank
Gabriel Campos	Single sculls	7.33.76	4 R	7.49.91	4 FB	9:02.94	11
Diego Nazário; Emmanuel Dantas	Double sculls	6:46.71	4 R	7:00.75	4 FB	6:47.13	8
Ailson Eráclito; Thiago Pereira Carvalho	Lwt double sculls	6:59.00	4 R	7:04.57	3 FB	6:36.24	7
Vinícius Delazeri; Victor Ruzicki	Coxless pair	6:48.76	2 R	7:11.29	2 F	6:38.96	4
Allan Bittencourt; Maciel Costa; Leandro Tozzo; Pedro Gondim	Coxless four	6:57.20	5	—N/a		6:41.34	5
Thiago Almeida; Renato Cataldo; David Faria; Guilherme Gomes	Lwt coxless four	6:28.14	4 R	7:00.67	5	Did not advance	
Allan Bittencourt; Maciel Costa; Leandro Tozzo; Pedro Gondim; Emanuel Dantas; Maciel Costa; Victor Ruzicki; Mauricio de Abreu	Eight	6:21.17	3	—N/a		6:34.10	5

Women

- Fabiana Beltrame
- Sophia Câmara Py
- Caroline Corado
- Yanka Britto
- Gabriella Salles

Athlete	Event	Heats		Repechage		Final	
Athlete	Event	Time	Rank	Time	Rank	Time	Rank
Fabiana Beltrame	Lwt single sculls	7:36.28	1 FA	—N/a		8:54.36	2nd place, silver medalist(s)
Gabriella Salles; Yanka Britto	Double sculls	7:57.88	6	—N/a		7:38.09	6
Caroline Corado; Sophia Py	Lwt double sculls	7:47.41	4 R	7:46.68	4 FA	7:10.01	5
Caroline Corado; Sophia Câmara Py; Yanka Britto; Gabriella Salles	Quadruple sculls	6:54.58	4	—N/a		7:32.88	6

Qualification Legend: FA or F=Final A (medal); FB=Final B (non-medal); R=Repechage

== Rugby sevens ==
Brazil has qualified a men's and women's teams for a total of 24 athletes (12 men and 12 women).

=== Men ===
Brazil announced their squad on July 1, 2015.

- Fernando Portugal
- Martin Schaefer
- Juliano Fiori
- Matheus Daniel
- Lucas Duque
- Moisés Duque
- Lucas Muller
- Lucas Drudi
- Lucas Domingues
- Matthew Gardner
- Gustavo Albuquerque
- André Silva

Group B

Team	Pld	W	D	L	PF	PA	PD	Pts	Qualification
Argentina	3	3	0	0	81	14	+67	9	Qualified for the quarterfinals
Canada	3	2	0	1	78	35	+43	7	Qualified for the quarterfinals
Brazil	3	1	0	2	52	50	+2	5	Qualified for the quarterfinals
Guyana	3	0	0	3	5	117	−112	3	Qualified for the quarterfinals

11 July 2015
11:55

Argentina	19–7	Brazil
	Report

Exhibition Stadium, Toronto

11 July 2015
17:11

Canada	26–14	Brazil
	Report

Exhibition Stadium, Toronto

11 July 2015
19:33

Brazil	31–5	Guyana
	Report

Exhibition Stadium, Toronto

Quarterfinals

12 July 2015
11:55

Uruguay	12–5	Brazil
	Report

Exhibition Stadium, Toronto

=== Women ===
Brazil announced their squad on July 1, 2015.

- Juliana Esteves dos Santos
- Bruna Lotufo
- Beatriz Futuro Muhlbauer
- Edna Santini
- Paula Ishibashi
- Isadora Cerullo
- Claudia Lopes Teles
- Haline Leme Scatrut
- Angelica Pereira Gevaerd
- Maira Bravo Behrendt
- Raquel Kochhann
- Mariana Barbosa Ramalho

Team	Pld	W	D	L	PF	PA	PD	Pts	Qualification
Canada	5	5	0	0	230	12	+218	15	Qualified for gold-medal match
United States	5	4	0	1	203	48	+155	13	Qualified for gold-medal match
Brazil	5	3	0	2	115	67	+48	11	Qualified for bronze-medal match
Argentina	5	1	1	3	57	131	−74	8	Qualified for bronze-medal match
Colombia	5	1	1	3	29	148	−119	8	
Mexico	5	0	0	5	24	252	−228	5	

11 July 2015
10:27

United States	26–7	Brazil
	Report

Exhibition Stadium, Toronto

11 July 2015
13:11

Brazil	22–5	Argentina
	Report

Exhibition Stadium, Toronto

11 July 2015
17:55

Canada	36–0	Brazil
	Report

Exhibition Stadium, Toronto

12 July 2015
10:27

Colombia	0–29	Brazil
	Report

Exhibition Stadium, Toronto

12 July 2015
13:11

Brazil	57–0	Mexico
	Report

Exhibition Stadium, Toronto

12 July 2015
17:55

(bronze) Brazil	29–0	Argentina
	Report

Exhibition Stadium, Toronto

== Sailing ==
Men

Athlete	Event	Race														Net Points	Final Rank
Athlete	Event	1	2	3	4	5	6	7	8	9	10	11	12	13	M	Net Points	Final Rank
Ricardo Santos	Windsurfer (RS:X)	1	2	1	1	3	1	2	1	1	2	2	2	4	3	30	1st place, gold medalist(s)
Robert Scheidt	Single-handed Dinghy (Laser)	7	(15)DSQ	7	3	3	1	5	2	4	1	3	1		5	47	2nd place, silver medalist(s)

Women

Athlete	Event	Race																	Net Points	Final Rank
Athlete	Event	1	2	3	4	5	6	7	8	9	10	11	12	13	14	15	16	M	Net Points	Final Rank
Patrícia Freitas	Windsurfer (RS:X)	1	2	1	1	1	1	2	1	1	1	4	2	1	\	\	\	1	17	1st place, gold medalist(s)
Fernanda Decnop	Single-handed Dinghy (Laser)	12	2	3	7	15	1	5	5	10	1	1	5	\	\	\	\	6	64	3rd place, bronze medalist(s)
Martine Grael; Kahena Kunze	49erFX	4	OCS	1	1	4	2	6	OCS	1	5	2	1	4	2	1	3	4	50	2nd place, silver medalist(s)

Mixed

Athlete	Event	Race													Net Points	Final Rank
Athlete	Event	1	2	3	4	5	6	7	8	9	10	11	12	M	Net Points	Final Rank
Claudio Biekarck; Maria Hackerott; Gunnar Ficker	Multi-crewed Dinghy (Lightning)	2	3	2	2	3	4	6	1	4	3	4	5	2	43	3rd place, bronze medalist(s)

Open

Athlete	Event	Race													Net Points	Final Rank
Athlete	Event	1	2	3	4	5	6	7	8	9	10	11	12	M	Net Points	Final Rank
Claudio Luiz Teixeira; Bruno Oliveira	Multihull (Hobie 16)	7	4	2	1	2	6	6	7	2	7	6	5		53	7
Alexandre Saldanha; Guilherme Hamelmann; John King; Daniel Santiago	Keelboat (J/24)	1	1	1	1	1	1	1	1	1	1	1	1	1	54	5
Geórgia Rodrigues; Alexandre Paradeda	Double-handed Dinghy (Snipe)	8	RET	5	6	8	7	5	7	4	9	4	1		75	6
João Augusto Hackerott	Single-handed Dinghy (Sunfish)	5	6	5	2	3	4	3	6	6	6	2	2	3	50	4

== Shooting ==
Brazil has qualified 19 shooters, 13 men and 6 women.

Men

- Bruno Heck
- Cassio Rippel
- Eduardo Corrêa
- Emerson Duarte
- Iosef Forma
- Jaison Santin
- Leonardo Moreira
- Luiz Fernando da Graça
- Renato Portela
- Rodrigo Bastos
- Stênio Yamamoto

Event	Athlete	Qualification		Final	
Event	Athlete	Score	Rank	Score	Rank
10 m air pistol	Júlio Almeida	576-18x	5th Q	95.1	7
10 m air pistol	Felipe Almeida Wu	576-15x Q	3	201.8	1st place, gold medalist(s)
25 m rapid fire pistol	Emerson Duarte	579-31x	9th	31	2nd place, silver medalist(s)
25 m rapid fire pistol	Iosef Forma	546	12th	Did not advance	
Trap	Eduardo Corrêa	105	14th	Did not advance	
Trap	Rodrigo Bastos	116	13th	Did not advance	
50 m pistol	Stênio Yamamoto	545- 8x	5th Q	89,8	7
10 m Air Rifle	Bruno Heck	141,4	4th Q	160,3	4
10 m Air Rifle	Leonardo Moreira	604,1	17th	Did not advance	
Double Trap	Luiz Fernando Da Graca	119	5th Q	26	5
Double Trap	Jaison Santin	118	8th	Did not advance	
50 m rifle prone	Cassio Rippel	625,9-22x	1st	207,7	1st place, gold medalist(s)
50 m rifle prone	Bruno Heck	623-8x	4th	141-4x	5
50 m rifle 3 positions	Bruno Heck	1158- 52x	13th	412.2	5
50 m rifle 3 positions	Leonardo Moreira	1138	13th	Did not advance	
Skeet	Renato Portela	110	23rd	Did not advance	

Women

Event	Athlete	Qualification		Final	
Event	Athlete	Score	Rank	Score	Rank
10 m air pistol	Rachel Da Silveira	361-03x	20th	Did not advance	
Trap	Gisele Braga	58	10th	Did not advance	
Trap	Janice Teixeira	60	3rd Q	10	5
10 m air rifle	Rosane Ewald	404.8	16th	Did not advance	
10 m air rifle	Raquel Gomes	374.6	28th	Did not advance	
25 m pistol	Rachel Da Silveira	554- 10 x	14th	Did not advance	
50 m rifle 3 positions	Rosane Ewald	555- 17x	22nd	Did not advance	
Skeet	Daniela Carraro	58	7th	Did not advance	

== Softball ==
Brazil has qualified a women's of 15 athletes.

Women

Brazil announced their squad on April 14, 2015.

- Mayra Akamine
- Yip Kimberly Chan
- Gabriela dos Santos
- Veronika Fukunishi
- Nilze Higa
- Vivian Morimoto
- Martha Murazawa
- Thais Nagano
- Roseanna Portioli
- Camila Silva
- Regina Chie Someya
- Simone Suetsugu
- Samira Tanaka
- Maria Ueno
- Bárbara Woll

Group A

Team	Pld	W	L	RF	RA	RD	Qualification
United States	5	5	0	43	4	+39	Qualified for the semifinals
Canada	5	4	1	21	14	+7	Qualified for the semifinals
Puerto Rico	5	3	2	18	17	+1	Qualified for the semifinals
Brazil	5	2	3	7	19	−12	Qualified for the semifinals
Cuba	5	1	4	10	23	−13	
Dominican Republic	5	0	5	14	36	−22	

19 July 2015; 16:30	Canada	6 – 0	Brazil	President’s Choice Ajax Pan Am Ballpark, Ajax; Attendance: 2,234
19 July 2015; 16:30		Boxscore		President’s Choice Ajax Pan Am Ballpark, Ajax; Attendance: 2,234

20 July 2015; 14:00	Brazil	0 – 7	United States	President’s Choice Ajax Pan Am Ballpark, Ajax; Attendance: 502
20 July 2015; 14:00		Boxscore		President’s Choice Ajax Pan Am Ballpark, Ajax; Attendance: 502

21 July 2015; 16:30	Brazil	2 – 1	Dominican Republic	President’s Choice Ajax Pan Am Ballpark, Ajax; Attendance: 2,900
21 July 2015; 16:30		Boxscore		President’s Choice Ajax Pan Am Ballpark, Ajax; Attendance: 2,900

22 July 2015; 14:00	Puerto Rico	2 – 0	Brazil	President’s Choice Ajax Pan Am Ballpark, Ajax; Attendance: 460
22 July 2015; 14:00		Boxscore		President’s Choice Ajax Pan Am Ballpark, Ajax; Attendance: 460

23 July 2015; 16:30	Brazil	5 – 3	Cuba	President’s Choice Ajax Pan Am Ballpark, Ajax; Attendance: 347
23 July 2015; 16:30		Boxscore		President’s Choice Ajax Pan Am Ballpark, Ajax; Attendance: 347

Semifinals

24 July 2015; 16:30	Puerto Rico	12 – 2 (4)	Brazil	President’s Choice Ajax Pan Am Ballpark, Ajax; Attendance: 1,050
24 July 2015; 16:30		Boxscore		President’s Choice Ajax Pan Am Ballpark, Ajax; Attendance: 1,050

== Squash ==
Brazil has qualified 3 squash players (all women).

Women

Athlete	Event	Round of 32	Round of 16	Quarterfinals	Semifinal	Final	
Athlete	Event	Opposition Score	Opposition Score	Opposition Score	Opposition Score	Opposition Score	Result
Thaisa Serafini	Singles	Bye	Karla Urrutia (MEX)W 3–0	Amanda Sobhy (USA); L 0–3	Did not advance		
Tatiana Damasio	Singles	Bye	Olivia Blatchford (USA); L 0–3	Did not advance			
Tatiana Damasio; Giovanna Veiga	Doubles	Bye	Natalie Grainger (USA); Amanda Sobhy (USA)L 0–2	Did not advance			

Athletes	Event	Preliminaries Group stage			Quarterfinal	Semifinal	Final
Athletes	Event	Opposition Result	Opposition Result	Opposition Result	Opposition Result	Opposition Result	Opposition Result
Giovanna Almeida; Tatiana Borges; Thaisa Serafini	Team	Argentina L 1-2	Colombia L 0-3	Canada L 0-3	5th-8th place match: Chile L 1-2	7th-8th place match: Guatemala W 2-0	

== Swimming ==
Brazil has qualified 35 athletes total, 18 men and 17 women:

Men

Event	Athletes	Heats		Final	
Event	Athletes	Time	Position	Time	Position
50 m freestyle	Bruno Fratus	22.33	3	21.91	2nd place, silver medalist(s)
50 m freestyle	Nicholas Santos	22.74	9	22.55	10
100 m freestyle	Marcelo Chierighini	48.92	3	48.80	3rd place, bronze medalist(s)
100 m freestyle	Matheus Santana	49.52	8	49.58	7
200 m freestyle	João de Lucca	1:48.78	6	1:46.42	1st place, gold medalist(s)
200 m freestyle	Nicolas Oliveira	1:49.51	7	1:47.81	5
400 m freestyle	Leonardo de Deus	3:51.40	2	3:50.30	3rd place, bronze medalist(s)
400 m freestyle	Lucas Kanieski	3:53.80	9	3:52.73	10
1500 m freestyle	Lucas Kanieski	15:14.18	7	15:23.91	7
1500 m freestyle	Brandonn Almeida	15:12.20	3	15:11.70	3rd place, bronze medalist(s)
100 m backstroke	Guilherme Guido	54.04	1	53.35	2nd place, silver medalist(s)
100 m backstroke	Thiago Pereira	DNS			DNS
200 m backstroke	Leonardo de Deus	2:00.80	4	1:58.27	3rd place, bronze medalist(s)
200 m backstroke	Brandonn Almeida	2:02.32	10	DNS	DNS
100 m breaststroke	Felipe França Silva	59.84 PR	1	59.21	1st place, gold medalist(s)
100 m breaststroke	Felipe Lima	1:00.57	3	1:00.01	2nd place, silver medalist(s)
200 m breaststroke	Thiago Simon	2:12.05	2	2:09.82	1st place, gold medalist(s)
200 m breaststroke	Thiago Pereira	2:12.89	5	2:11.93	3rd place, bronze medalist(s)
100 m butterfly	Arthur Mendes	52.85	7	52.85	7
100 m butterfly	Thiago Pereira	DNS			
100 m butterfly	Nicholas Santos	DNS			
200 m butterfly	Kaio de Almeida	1:59.24	6	1:58.51	5
200 m butterfly	Leonardo de Deus	1:58.44	2	1:55.01	1st place, gold medalist(s)
200 m individual medley	Henrique Rodrigues	1:59.91	1	1:57.06	1st place, gold medalist(s)
200 m individual medley	Thiago Pereira	2:01.68	4	1:57.42	2nd place, silver medalist(s)
400 m individual medley	Brandonn Almeida	4:20.59	5	4:14.47	1st place, gold medalist(s)
400 m individual medley	Thiago Pereira	4:19.92	4	4:14.47	DSQ
4 × 100 m freestyle relay	Matheus Santana; João de Lucca; Bruno Fratus; Marcelo Chierighini; Nicolas Oliveira; Thiago Pereira	3:17.87	1	3:13.66	1st place, gold medalist(s)
4 × 200 m freestyle relay	Luiz Altamir Melo; João de Lucca; Thiago Pereira; Nicolas Oliveira; Henrique Rodrigues; Kaio de Almeida; Thiago Simon	7:29.42	3	7:11.15	1st place, gold medalist(s)
4 × 100 m medley relay	Guilherme Guido; Felipe França Silva; Arthur Mendes; Marcelo Chierighini; Thiago Pereira; Felipe Lima	3:42.83	3	3:32.68	1st place, gold medalist(s)
10 km marathon	Luiz Arapiraca	—N/a		1:55:12.7	5
10 km marathon	Samuel de Bona	—N/a		DNF	18

Women

Event	Athletes	Heats		Final	
Event	Athletes	Time	Position	Time	Position
50 m freestyle	Etiene Medeiros	24.75	2	24.55	2nd place, silver medalist(s)
50 m freestyle	Graciele Herrmann	24.97	4	24.94	7
100 m freestyle	Larissa Oliveira	55.01	5	54.61	5
100 m freestyle	Graciele Herrmann	55.54	8	55.01	6
200 m freestyle	Larissa Oliveira	1:59.62	3	2:00.32	5
200 m freestyle	Manuella Lyrio	1:59.60	2	1:58.03	3rd place, bronze medalist(s)
400 m freestyle	Carolina Bilich	4:16.92	7	4:17.40	7
400 m freestyle	Manuella Lyrio	4:15.38	3	4:10.92	4
800 m freestyle	Carolina Bilich	8:40.79	2	8:47.94	9
800 m freestyle	Bruna Primati	8:40.75	1	8:40.75	7
100 m backstroke	Etiene Medeiros	1:00.74	3	59.61	1st place, gold medalist(s)
100 m backstroke	Natalia de Luccas	1:01.89	9	1:02.15	9
200 m backstroke	Joanna Maranhão	2:12.35	5	2:12.05	5
200 m backstroke	Luiza Padovan	2:20.08	13	2:21.17	15
100 m breaststroke	Beatriz Travalon	1:08.99	7	1:09.23	6
100 m breaststroke	Jhennifer Conceição	1:08.75	5	DSQ	8
200 m breaststroke	Beatriz Travalon	2:32.73	11	2:33.21	11
200 m breaststroke	Pamela Alencar	2:31.14	8	2:32.41	8
100 m butterfly	Daiene Dias	59.16	4	58.74	5
100 m butterfly	Daynara de Paula	58.70	5	58.56	4
200 m butterfly	Joanna Maranhão	2:12.64	6	2:09.38	3rd place, bronze medalist(s)
200 m butterfly	Manuella Lyrio	2:15.55	10	2:13.37	9
200 m individual medley	Gabrielle Roncatto	2:17.67	8	2:17.02	7
200 m individual medley	Joanna Maranhão	2:15.32	6	2:12.39	4
400 m individual medley	Gabrielle Roncatto	4:55.65	10	4:53.49	10
400 m individual medley	Joanna Maranhão	4:45.28	5	4:38.07	3rd place, bronze medalist(s)
4 × 100 m freestyle relay	Larissa Oliveira; Graciele Herrmann; Etiene Medeiros; Daynara de Paula; Daiane Oliveira; Manuella Lyrio	3:46.73	3	3:37.39	3rd place, bronze medalist(s)
4 × 200 m freestyle relay	Manuella Lyrio; Jéssica Cavalheiro; Joanna Maranhão; Larissa Oliveira; Bruna Primati; Gabrielle Roncatto	8:19.87	3	7:56.36	2nd place, silver medalist(s)
4 × 100 m medley relay	Etiene Medeiros; Jhennifer Conceição; Daynara de Paula; Larissa Oliveira; Natalia de Luccas; Beatriz Travalon	4:11.06	3	4:02.52	3rd place, bronze medalist(s)
10 km marathon	Carolina Bilich	—N/a		2:04:40.3	10

== Synchronized swimming ==
Brazil has qualified a full team of nine athletes.

Athlete	Event	Technical Routine		Free Routine (Final)			
Athlete	Event	Points	Rank	Points	Rank	Total Points	Rank
Luisa Borges; Maria Eduarda Miccuci	Women's duet	80.9667	4	82.3000	4	163.2667	4
Luisa Borges; Maria Eduarda Miccuci; Lorena Molinos; Beatriz Feres; Branca Feres; Maria Bruno; Maria Clara Coutinho; Sabrine Lowe; Lara Teixeira	Women's team	80.8605	4	82.9000	4	163.7605	4

== Table tennis ==
Brazil has qualified a men's and women's team.

Men

Athlete	Event	Group stage				Round of 32	Round of 16	Quarterfinals	Semifinals	Final / BM	
Athlete	Event	Opposition Result	Opposition Result	Opposition Result	Rank	Opposition Result	Opposition Result	Opposition Result	Opposition Result	Opposition Result	Rank
Gustavo Tsuboi	Singles	Geovanny Coello (ECU)W 4 – 1	Marko Medjugorac (CAN) W 4 – 0	Kanak Jha (USA) W 4 – 0		Bye	Jorge Campos (CUB) W 4 – 3	Pierre Thieriault (CAN) W 4 – 1	Thiago Monteiro (BRA) W 4 – 3	Hugo Calderano (BRA) L 3-4	2nd place, silver medalist(s)
Hugo Calderano	Singles	Jimmy Butler (USA)W 4 – 0	Felipe Olivares (CHI) W 4 – 0	Isaac Vila (DOM) W 4 – 0		Bye	Gaston Alto (ARG) W 4 – 1	Alberto Mino (ECU) W 4 – 0	Eugene Wang (CAN) W 4 – 3	Gustavo Tsuboi (BRA) W 4 – 3	1st place, gold medalist(s)
Thiago Monteiro	Singles	Manuel Moya (CHI) W 4 – 0	Rodrigo Gilabert (ARG) W 4 – 2	Johan Chavez (PER) W 4 – 0		Bye	Brian Afanador (PUR) W 4 – 0	Felipe Olivares (CHI) W 4 – 3	Gustavo Tsuboi (BRA) L 3-4	Did not ad vance	3rd place, bronze medalist(s)
	Team	Ecuador; W 3 – 0, 3 – 1, 3 – 0	United States; W 3 – 0, 3 – 1, 3 – 0	—N/a		—N/a		Chile; W 3 – 0, 3 – 0, 3 – 0	Canada; W 3 – 0, 3 – 0, 3 – 0	Paraguay; W 3 – 0, 3 – 0, 3 – 0	1st place, gold medalist(s)

Women

Athlete	Event	Group stage				Round of 32	Round of 16	Quarterfinals	Semifinals	Final / BM	
Athlete	Event	Opposition Result	Opposition Result	Opposition Result	Rank	Opposition Result	Opposition Result	Opposition Result	Opposition Result	Opposition Result	Rank
Lin Gui	Singles	Angela Mori (PER) W 4 – 0	Camila Arquelles (ARG)W 4 – 1	Alicia Cote (CAN)W 4 – 0		Bye	Jiaq Zheng (USA)W 4 – 2	Anqi Luo (CAN)W 4 – 2	Lili Zhang (USA)W 4 -3	Jennifer Wu (USA) L 3-4	2nd place, silver medalist(s)
Caroline Kumahara	Singles	Roxy Gonzalez (VEN) W 4 – 0	Carelyn Cordero (PUR) W 4 – 1	Jiaqi Zhang (USA)W 4 – 1		Bye	Paula Medina (COL) W 4 – 3	Zhang Mo (CAN) W 4 – 1	Jennifer Wu (USA) L 1- 4	Did not advance	3rd place, bronze medalist(s)
Lígia Silva	Singles	Idalys Lovet (CUB) W 4 – 1	Paulina Vega (CHI) W 4 – 1	Mercedes Madrid (MEX) W 4 – 0		Bye	Lady Ruano (COL) L 3 – 4				
	Team	Peru; W 3 – 0, 3 – 1, 3 – 0	Cuba; W 3 – 0, 3 – 1, 3 – 0	—N/a		—N/a		Colombia; W 3 – 0, 3 – 0, 3 – 0	Puerto Rico; W 3 – 0, 3 – 0, 3 – 0	United States; L 0-3, 0-3,0-3	2nd place, silver medalist(s)

== Taekwondo ==
Brazil has qualified a full team of eight athletes (four men and four women).

Men

Athlete	Event	Round of 16	Quarterfinals	Semifinals	Repechage	Bronze medal	Final	
Athlete	Event	Opposition Result	Opposition Result	Opposition Result	Opposition Result	Opposition Result	Opposition Result	Rank
Venilton Teixeira	–58kg	Victor Gonzalez (PAN) W 14 – 1	Logan Gerrick (USA) W 12 – 8	Carlos Navarro (MEX) L 9 – 11			Lucas Guzman (ARG) L 0 – 2	
Henrique Precioso	–68kg	Federico González (URU) W 4 – 1	Maxime Potvin (CAN) L 5 – 15			Luis Colon III (PUR) L 3 – 6	Did not advance	
André Bilia	–80kg	Jose Cubas (CUB) L 5 – 8			Javier Medina (VEN)L 7 – 9	Did not advance		
Guilherme Félix	+80kg	Bye	Martin Sio (ARG)L 2 – 4	Did not advance				

Women

Athlete	Event	Round of 16	Quarterfinals	Semifinals	Repechage	Bronze medal	Final	
Athlete	Event	Opposition Result	Opposition Result	Opposition Result	Opposition Result	Opposition Result	Opposition Result	Rank
Iris Tang Sing	–49kg	Yania Aguirre (CUB) L 5 – 8			Virginia Delan (VEN)W 11-1	Yvette Yong (CAN) W 2-0	Did not ad vance	3rd place, bronze medalist(s)
Josiane Lima	–57kg	Danna Poggio (URU)W WO	Doris Patiño (COL) L 0 – 4	Did not advance				
Júlia Vasconcelos	–67kg	Brieanna Hernandez (PUR)W 12 – 5	Adanis Cordero (COL)W 3 – 1	Paige McPherson (USA) L 6- 8		Alexis Arnoldt (ARG)L 1- 5	Did not advance	
Raphaella Galacho	+67kg	Bye	Katherine Rodriguez (DOM)W 4 – 0	Jackie Galloway (USA) L 0- 5		Nathalie Iliesco (CAN)W 1-0	Did not advance	3rd place, bronze medalist(s)

== Tennis ==
Brazil has qualified a full team of six athletes (three men and three women).

Men

Athlete	Event	1st Round	Round of 32	Round of 16	Quarterfinals	Semifinals	Final
Athlete	Event	Opposition Score	Opposition Score	Opposition Score	Opposition Score	Opposition Score	Opposition Score
Orlando Luz	Singles	A Obando (HON); W 6 – 1, 6 – 1	D Novikov (USA); L 1 – 6, 6 – 7	Did not advance			
João Menezes	Singles	A Behar (URU); W 6 – 3, 7 – 6(3)	N Jarry (CHI); W 5 – 7, 6 – 3, 6 – 4	G Escobar (ECU); L 6 – 7, 6 – 7	Did not advance		
Marcelo Zormann	Singles	E Cid (DOM); L 6 – 4, 2 – 6, 5 – 7	Did not advance				
Orlando Luz; Marcelo Zormann	Doubles	H Hach (MEX); L Patiño (MEX); L 6 – 1, 3 – 6, [12] – [14]	Did not advance				

Women

Athlete	Event	Round of 32	Round of 16	Quarterfinals	Semifinals	Final
Athlete	Event	Opposition Score	Opposition Score	Opposition Score	Opposition Score	Opposition Score
Beatriz Haddad Maia	Singles	F Brito (CHI); L 1 – 6,0 – 6	Did not advance			
Gabriela Cé	Singles	G Dabrowski (CAN); L 3 – 6, 6 – 4, 3 – 6	Did not advance			
Paula Gonçalves	Singles	D Seguel (CHI); W 2 – 6, 6 – 3, 7 – 6	V Royg (PAR); L 4 – 6, 1 – 6	Did not advance		
Beatriz Haddad Maia; Paula Gonçalves	Doubles	—N/a		Bye	Victoria Rodríguez (MEX) Marcela Zacarías (MEX); L 6 – 7, 6 – 4, [8]-[10]	María Irigoyen (ARG) Paula Ormaechea (ARG) L WO

Mixed

Athlete	Event	Round of 16	Quarterfinals	Semifinals	Final
Athlete	Event	Opposition Score	Opposition Score	Opposition Score	Opposition Score
João Menezes; Gabriela Cé	Doubles	AS Sánchez (MEX); M Sánchez (MEX)W 6-4,2-6,[10]-[6]	M Duque Mariño (COL); E Struvay (COL); L 4 – 6, 1 – 6	Did not advance	

== Trampoline ==
Brazil has qualified 2 athletes.

Athlete	Event	Qualification		Final	
Athlete	Event	Score	Rank	Score	Rank
Carlos Ramirez Pala	Men's				
Camilla Gomes	Women's				

== Triathlon ==
Brazil has qualified a full triathlon team.

Men

Athlete	Event	Swim (1.5 km)	Trans 1	Bike (40 km)	Trans 2	Run (10 km)	Total	Rank
Diogo Sclebin	Individual	18:59	15	19:24	11	1:18:01	1:50:24	15
Danilo Pimentel	Individual	19:10					1:51:52	22
Reinaldo Colucci	Individual	19:10	19:34	17	58:05	1:17:40	1:51:24	21

Women

Athlete	Event	Swim (1.5 km)	Trans 1	Bike (40 km)	Trans 2	Run (10 km)	Total	Rank
Pâmella Oliveira	Individual						2:00:05	10
Beatriz Neres	Individual						2:05:33	17
Luisa Baptista	Individual						2:05:34	18

== Volleyball ==
Brazil has qualified a men's and women's volleyball team, for a total of 24 athletes (12 men and 12 women).

Men

Brazil announced their squad on June 30, 2015.

- Carlos Eduardo Silva
- Douglas Souza
- Flávio Gualberto
- João Rafael Ferreira
- Maurício Borges Silva
- Maurício Souza
- Murilo Radke
- Otávio Pinto
- Rafael Araújo
- Renan Buiatti
- Thiago Veloso
- Tiago Brendle

Group A

Pos	Team	Pld	W	L	Pts	SPW	SPL	SPR	SW	SL	SR
1	Brazil	3	2	1	12	258	220	1.173	8	3	2.667
2	Argentina	3	2	1	9	243	205	1.185	6	4	1.500
3	Cuba	3	2	1	9	255	255	1.000	7	5	1.400
4	Colombia	3	0	3	0	149	225	0.662	0	9	0.000

Source: Archived 2016-03-04 at the Wayback Machine

17 July 2015; 13:35	Brazil	3–0	Colombia	Exhibition Centre, Toronto; Attendance: 2,000
17 July 2015; 13:35	(25–16, 25–13, 25–16) result statistics			Exhibition Centre, Toronto; Attendance: 2,000

19 July 2015; 13:35	Brazil	2–3	Cuba	Exhibition Centre, Toronto; Attendance: 4,500
19 July 2015; 13:35	(20–25, 25–18, 23–25, 25–22, 11–15) result statistics			Exhibition Centre, Toronto; Attendance: 4,500

21 July 2015; 13:35	Brazil	3–0	Argentina	Exhibition Centre, Toronto; Attendance: 3,600
21 July 2015; 13:35	(29–27, 25–21, 25–22) result statistics			Exhibition Centre, Toronto; Attendance: 3,600

=== Semifinals ===
24 July 2015; 21:53	Brazil	3–0	Puerto Rico	Exhibition Centre, Toronto; Attendance: 3,000
24 July 2015; 21:53	(25–16, 25–17, 25–23) result statistics			Exhibition Centre, Toronto; Attendance: 3,000

=== Gold medal match ===
26 July 2015; 15:05	(gold) Argentina	3–2	Brazil (silver)	Exhibition Centre, Toronto; Attendance: 4,900
26 July 2015; 15:05	(25–23, 18–25, 19–25, 25–23, 15–8) result statistics			Exhibition Centre, Toronto; Attendance: 4,900

2015 Pan American Games 2nd place

Brazil

Women

Team

- Rosamaria Montibeller #1
- Adenízia da Silva #5
- Jaqueline Carvalho #8
- Michelle Pavão #9
- Joyce da Silva #11
- Ana Tiemi #14
- Fernanda Garay #16
- Camila Brait #18
- Angélica Malinverno #21
- Mariana Costa #22 / 25
- Bárbara Brunch #23
- Macris Carneiro #24

Group B

Pos	Team	Pld	W	L	Pts	SPW	SPL	SPR	SW	SL	SR
1	Brazil	3	3	0	10	320	273	1.172	9	5	1.800
2	United States	3	2	1	12	254	200	1.270	8	3	2.667
3	Puerto Rico	3	1	2	7	232	247	0.939	5	6	0.833
4	Peru	3	0	3	1	164	250	0.656	1	9	0.111

Source: Archived 2015-10-20 at the Wayback Machine

Date		Score		Set 1	Set 2	Set 3	Set 4	Set 5	Total	Report
Jul 16	Brazil	3–2	Puerto Rico	23–25	28–26	25–17	24–26	15–10	115–104	P2P3
Jul 18	Brazil	3–1	Peru	25–27	25–5	25–17	25–16		100–65	P2P3
Jul 20	United States	2–3	Brazil	25–22	21–25	25–18	22–25	11-15	104–105	P2P3

=== Semifinals ===
Date		Score		Set 1	Set 2	Set 3	Set 4	Set 5	Total	Report
Jul 23	Brazil	3–2	Puerto Rico	18–25	24–26	25–22	25–19	15–11	107–103	P2 P3

=== Gold medal match ===
Date		Score		Set 1	Set 2	Set 3	Set 4	Set 5	Total	Report
Jul 25	Brazil	0–3	United States	22–25	21–25	26–28			69–78	P2 P3

2015 Pan American Games 2nd place

Brazil

== Water polo ==
Brazil has qualified a men's and women's teams. Each team will consist of 13 athletes, for a total of 26.

=== Men ===
Brazil announced their squad on April 16, 2015.

- Adrián Delgado
- Bernardo Gomes
- Bernardo Rocha
- Felipe Perrone
- Felipe Costa e Silva
- Guilherme Gomes
- Gustavo Guimarães
- Ives Alonso
- Jonas Crivella
- Josip Vrlić
- Paulo Salemi
- Thyê Bezerra
- Vinicius Antonelli

Group B

Team	Pld	W	D	L	GF	GA	GD	Pts	Qualification
Brazil	3	3	0	0	55	20	+35	6	Qualified for the semifinals
Canada	3	2	0	1	44	22	+22	4	Qualified for the semifinals
Mexico	3	0	1	2	27	50	−23	1	
Venezuela	3	0	1	2	13	47	−34	1	

7 July 2015; 18:08	Report	Canada	9–11	Brazil	Markham Pan Am Centre; Referees: Thomas Molnae (HUN), Jaume Teixeira (ESP)
7 July 2015; 18:08	Report	Score by quarters: 2–4, 4–3, 1–4, 2–0			Markham Pan Am Centre; Referees: Thomas Molnae (HUN), Jaume Teixeira (ESP)
7 July 2015; 18:08	Report	Conway 3, Boyd 2	Goals	Perrone 3	Markham Pan Am Centre; Referees: Thomas Molnae (HUN), Jaume Teixeira (ESP)

8 July 2015; 20:08	Report	Venezuela	2–22	Brazil	Markham Pan Am Centre; Referees: Humberto Navarro (USA), Diego Garibaldi (ARG)
8 July 2015; 20:08	Report	Score by quarters: 0–6, 1–6, 0–3, 1–7			Markham Pan Am Centre; Referees: Humberto Navarro (USA), Diego Garibaldi (ARG)
8 July 2015; 20:08	Report	Cardenas, Ramos 1	Goals	Perrone 4	Markham Pan Am Centre; Referees: Humberto Navarro (USA), Diego Garibaldi (ARG)

9 July 2015; 16:08	Report	Brazil	22–9	Mexico	Markham Pan Am Centre; Referees: Mark Maretzki (USA), Guillermo Grgicevic (ARG)
9 July 2015; 16:08	Report	Score by quarters: 3–3, 7–1, 4–2, 8–3			Markham Pan Am Centre; Referees: Mark Maretzki (USA), Guillermo Grgicevic (ARG)
9 July 2015; 16:08	Report	Gomes 7	Goals	Ponce 3	Markham Pan Am Centre; Referees: Mark Maretzki (USA), Guillermo Grgicevic (ARG)

Semifinals

13 July 2015; 20:00	Report	Argentina	9–15	Brazil	Markham Pan Am Centre; Referees: Arnoldo Zambrano (VEN), Daniel Vasquez (MEX)
13 July 2015; 20:00	Report	Score by quarters: 1-3, 1-4, 4-2, 4-5			Markham Pan Am Centre; Referees: Arnoldo Zambrano (VEN), Daniel Vasquez (MEX)
13 July 2015; 20:00	Report	Carabantes 3, Yanez 2, Veich 1, Bulgheroni 1, Damarchi 1, Lopez 1	Goals	Perrone 3	Markham Pan Am Centre; Referees: Arnoldo Zambrano (VEN), Daniel Vasquez (MEX)

Gold medal match

15 July 2015; 20:00	Report	(gold) United States	11–9	Brazil (silver)	Markham Pan Am Centre; Referees: Thomas Molnar (HUN), Jaume Teixido (ESP)
15 July 2015; 20:00	Report	Score by quarters: 1-0, 6-5, 3-3, 1-1			Markham Pan Am Centre; Referees: Thomas Molnar (HUN), Jaume Teixido (ESP)
15 July 2015; 20:00	Report	2 Players 3	Goals	2 Players 3	Markham Pan Am Centre; Referees: Thomas Molnar (HUN), Jaume Teixido (ESP)

=== Women ===
Brazil announced their squad on April 16, 2015.

- Catherine Oliveira
- Diana Abla
- Gabriela Dias
- Izabella Chiappini
- Lucianne Maia
- Luiza Carvalho
- Marina Zablith
- Marina Canetti
- Melani Dias
- Mirella Coutinho
- Tess Oliveira
- Victória Chamorro
- Viviane Bahia

Group B

Team	Pld	W	D	L	GF	GA	GD	Pts	Qualification
Canada	3	2	1	0	41	16	+25	5	Qualified for the semifinals
Brazil	3	2	1	0	42	18	+24	5	Qualified for the semifinals
Venezuela	3	0	1	2	16	44	−28	1	
Puerto Rico	3	0	1	2	26	47	−21	1	

7 July 2015; 12:08	Report	Canada	7–7	Brazil	Markham Pan Am Centre; Referees: Diego Garibaldi (ARG), Daniel Vazquez (MEX)
7 July 2015; 12:08	Report	Score by quarters: 1–2, 2–1, 2–3, 2–1			Markham Pan Am Centre; Referees: Diego Garibaldi (ARG), Daniel Vazquez (MEX)
7 July 2015; 12:08	Report	7 players 1	Goals	3 players 2	Markham Pan Am Centre; Referees: Diego Garibaldi (ARG), Daniel Vazquez (MEX)

9 July 2015; 08:08	Report	Venezuela	1–18	Brazil	Markham Pan Am Centre; Referees: Thomas Molnar (HUN), Daniel Vazquez (MEX)
9 July 2015; 08:08	Report	Score by quarters: 0–4, 0–2, 1–7, 0–5			Markham Pan Am Centre; Referees: Thomas Molnar (HUN), Daniel Vazquez (MEX)
9 July 2015; 08:08	Report	Marin 1	Goals	Chiappini 7	Markham Pan Am Centre; Referees: Thomas Molnar (HUN), Daniel Vazquez (MEX)

11 July 2015; 12:08	Report	Brazil	17–10	Puerto Rico	Markham Pan Am Centre; Referees: Jaume Teixido (SPA), Mark Maretzki (USA).
11 July 2015; 12:08	Report	Score by quarters: 4-2, 3-5, 5-1, 5-2			Markham Pan Am Centre; Referees: Jaume Teixido (SPA), Mark Maretzki (USA).
11 July 2015; 12:08	Report	Badocco 4	Goals	Montero 3	Markham Pan Am Centre; Referees: Jaume Teixido (SPA), Mark Maretzki (USA).

Semifinals

12 July 2015; 20:00	Report	United States	16–3	Brazil	Markham Pan Am Centre; Referees: Thomas Molnar (HUN), Jaume Teixido (SPA)
12 July 2015; 20:00	Report	Score by quarters: 3-1, 6-1, 5-0, 2-1			Markham Pan Am Centre; Referees: Thomas Molnar (HUN), Jaume Teixido (SPA)
12 July 2015; 20:00	Report	Steffens 3	Goals	Palaro 1	Markham Pan Am Centre; Referees: Thomas Molnar (HUN), Jaume Teixido (SPA)

Bronze medal match

14 July 2015; 18:00	Report	(bronze) Brazil	9–6	Cuba	Markham Pan Am Centre; Referees: Mark Maretzki (USA), William Mackay (CAN)
14 July 2015; 18:00	Report	Score by quarters: 2-0, 2-2, 2-2, 3-2			Markham Pan Am Centre; Referees: Mark Maretzki (USA), William Mackay (CAN)
14 July 2015; 18:00	Report	Chiappini 6	Goals	Ortiz 2	Markham Pan Am Centre; Referees: Mark Maretzki (USA), William Mackay (CAN)

== Water skiing ==
Brazil qualified 2 male athletes.

Athlete	Event	Semifinal		Final	
Athlete	Event	Points	Rank	Points	Rank
Felipe Neves	Slalom	2.00/58/11.25	11th	Did not advance	
Luciano Rondi Neto	Wakeboard	41.55	5th	58.77	6th

== Weightlifting ==
Brazil has qualified a team of 8 athletes. The weightlifters was selected during the Brazilian trials on 22 May 2015.

Athlete	Event	Snatch			Clean & Jerk			Total	Rank
Athlete	Event	Attempt 1	Attempt 2	Attempt 3	Attempt 1	Attempt 2	Attempt 3	Total	Rank
Marco Túlio Gregório	Men's 94 kg	155	160	165	182	187	192	347	6
Patrick Mendes	Men's 105 kg	170	175	175	200	206	206	370	4
Mateus Machado	Men's 105 kg	167	172	175	197	202	207	377	2nd place, silver medalist(s)
Fernando Reis	Men's +105 kg	180	192	195	221	235		427	1st place, gold medalist(s)
Letícia Laurindo	Women's 53 kg	75	75	75	90	95	96	171	6
Rosane Santos	Women's 53 kg	82	82	86	97	100	102	182	4
Bruna Piloto	Women's 63 kg	85	90	92	110	110	112	202	3rd place, bronze medalist(s)
Jaqueline Ferreira	Women's 75 kg	102	105	107	125	128	129	230	3rd place, bronze medalist(s)

== Wrestling ==
Brazil has qualified so far 5 female and 4 male athletes:

Freestyle

Athlete	Event	Quarterfinals	Semifinals	Final	
Athlete	Event	Opposition Result	Opposition Result	Opposition Result	Rank
Pedro Rocha	Men's 74 kg	Balfour (CAN); L 0–10	Did not advance		
Juan Bittencourt	Men's 97 kg	DNS	Did not advance		
Hugo Cunha	Men's 125 kg	Javis (CUB); L 0–10		Bronze medal match: Lopez (PUR); L 0–8	4
Kamila Barbosa	Women's 48 kg	Guzmán (CUB); L 4–15	Did not advance		
Giullia Penalber	Women's 53 kg	Valverde (ECU); L 4–5	Did not advance		
Joice Silva	Women's 58 kg	Romero (MEX); W 2–1	Sovero (PER); W 5–3	Stornell (CUB); W6-5	1st place, gold medalist(s)
Gilda Oliveira	Women's 69 kg	Vasquez (ARG); L0-7	Did not advance		
Aline Ferreira	Women's 75 kg	Adeline Gray (USA); L0-10		Bronze medal match: Gonzalez (PUR); W10-1	3rd place, bronze medalist(s)

Greco-Roman

Athlete	Event	Quarterfinals	Semifinals	Final	
Athlete	Event	Opposition Result	Opposition Result	Opposition Result	Rank
Davi Albino	Men's 98 kg	Latour (CAN); W10-1	Lugo (CUB); L 0–8	Bronze medal match: Loango (COL); W5-1	3rd place, bronze medalist(s)

== See also ==
- Brazil at the 2016 Summer Olympics
