= Weightlifting at the 2015 Pan American Games – Men's 105 kg =

Weightlifting – Men's 105 kg at the 2015 Pan American Games
- Venue: Oshawa Sports Centre
- Dates: July 15
- Competitors: 7 from 5 nations

Medalists
Gold medal	Jesús González	Venezuela
Silver medal	Mateus Gregorio Machado	Brazil
Bronze medal	Jorge Arroyo	Ecuador

The men's 105 kg competition of the weightlifting events at the 2015 Pan American Games in Toronto, Canada, was held on July 15 at the Oshawa Sports Centre. The defending champion was Jorge Arroyo from Ecuador.

== Schedule ==
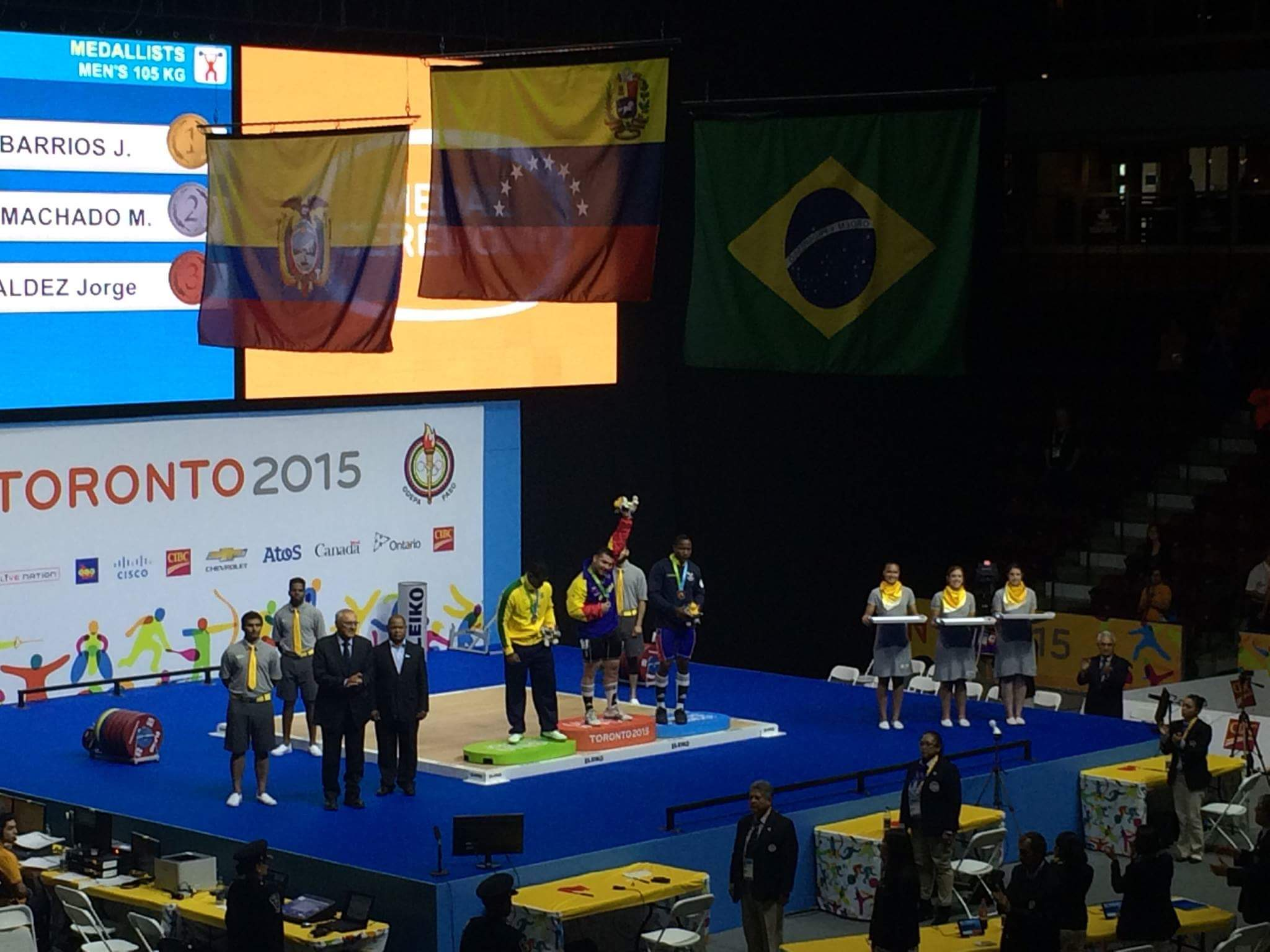
The medalists

All times are Eastern Daylight Time (UTC-4).

Date	Time	Round
July 15, 2015	14:00	Final

== Results ==
7 athletes from five countries took part.

Rank	Name	Country	Group	B.weight (kg)	Snatch (kg)	Clean & Jerk (kg)	Total (kg)
1st place, gold medalist(s)	Jesús González	Venezuela	A	104.51	175	210	385
2nd place, silver medalist(s)	Mateus Gregorio Machado	Brazil	A	104.51	175	202	377
3rd place, bronze medalist(s)	Jorge Arroyo	Ecuador	A	104.38	175	200	375
4	Patrick Mendes	Brazil	A	104.95	170	200	370
5	Alejandro Cisnero	Cuba	A	104.43	163	206	369
6	Asniel Rodriguez	Cuba	A	104.86	169	195	364
	José Familia	Dominican Republic	A	104.92	-	-	DNF
