= Juliano Fiori =

Brazilian rugby sevens player

- Born: June 27, 1985 (age 41) Hammersmith, England
- Height: 1.91 m (6 ft 3 in)
- Weight: 107 kg (236 lb; 16 st 12 lb)

Rugby union career
- Position(s): Prop (7s); Flanker
National sevens team
Years	Team	Comps
- Brazil

Juliano Fiori (born June 27, 1985) is a rugby sevens player. Born in England, he represented Brazil 7s at the 2016 Summer Olympics. His father is Brazilian and migrated to England in the seventies due to political upheaval.
