= Bruno Mendonça (field hockey) =

Brazilian field hockey player (born 1984)

Personal information
- Full name: Bruno da Silveira Mendonça
- Born: 7 January 1984 (age 42) Rio de Janeiro, Brazil
- Height: 1.83 m (6 ft 0 in)
- Weight: 93 kg (205 lb)

Sport
- Sport: Field hockey
National team
Years	Team	Caps	Goals
–	Brazil	81	(5)
Medal record
Men's field hockey
Representing Brazil
South American Games
Bronze medal – third place	2018 Cochabamba	Team
South American Championship
Bronze medal – third place	2013 Santiago

Bruno da Silveira Mendonça (born 7 January 1984) is a Brazilian field hockey player. He competed for the Brazil men's national field hockey team at the 2016 Summer Olympics.
