= Christopher McPherson =

Brazilian field hockey player (born 1984)

Chris McPherson
Personal information
- Full name: Christopher Paul McPherson
- Born: 19 June 1984 (age 42) Derby, England
- Height: 1.85 m (6 ft 1 in)
- Weight: 77 kg (170 lb)

Sport
- Sport: Field hockey
National team
Years	Team	Caps	Goals
2014–2016	Brazil	25	(1)

Christopher Paul McPherson (born 19 June 1984) is a Brazilian field hockey player. He competed in the men's field hockey tournament at the 2016 Summer Olympics.
