= Rodrigo Faustino =

Brazilian field hockey player (born 1987)

Personal information
- Born: 6 January 1987 (age 39)

Sport
- Country: Brazil
- Sport: Field hockey

Rodrigo Faustino (born 6 January 1987) is a Brazilian field hockey player. He competed in the men's field hockey tournament at the 2016 Summer Olympics.
