= Maurício Abreu =

Portuguese photographer (born 1954)

Maurício José Ferreira da Costa de Abreu
- Born: April 19, 1954 (age 71); Coimbra, Portugal
- Occupations: photographer, editor and cultural producer

Maurício José Ferreira da Costa de Abreu (born Coimbra, 19 April 1954) is a Portuguese photographer, editor and cultural producer. He is a leading name in Portuguese photography, as a specialist in the areas of natural and cultural patrimony, ethnography and traditional architecture.

== Biography ==
Abreu was born in Coimbra but has lived in the Setúbal region since 1964. A graduate in Electrical Engineering from the Instituto Superior Técnico of Lisbon in 1978, he became a professional photographer in 1983. Since then, he has developed several projects as a photographer, producer and editor, focusing his photography on a series of values that tend to be menaced by the modern civilization.

He is the author and editor of books dedicated to several aspects of Portuguese culture and regions, with texts by writers and journalists like José Manuel Fernandes, Álamo de Oliveira, Francisco José Viegas, Nuno Júdice and João de Melo. He was the photographer of José Saramago's travel book, Viagem a Portugal (Travel to Portugal), in 1990, which details a trip taken by the writer to the entire territory of Mainland Portugal.

He was elected QEP (Qualified European Photographer) by the FEP (European National Professional Photographers Associations) in Belgium, in 2009.

In 2002, his portraits of Setúbal citizens, taken from 1997 to 2000, were on display as part of the exhibition "How many minorities make up the whole" at the Setúbal Museum/Convento de Jesus.

== Works published ==
=== Personal projects ===
- O Homem e o Mar - O Litoral Português (1987), text by José Manuel Fernandes
- Açores (1987), text by Álamo de Oliveira
- Comboios Portugueses - Um Guia Sentimental (1987), text by Francisco José Viegas
- Nas Margens de Um Rio (1988), text by Francisco José Viegas
- Rios de Portugal (1990), text by José Manuel Fernandes
- São Miguel - Açores (1992), text by João de Melo
- Madeira - Porto Santo (1993), text by Vicente Jorge Silva
- Serras de Portugal (1994), text by José Manuel Fernandes
- Algarve (1995), text by Nuno Júdice
- O Ar, a Terra, a Água - Um Cântico Votivo (1996), text by Francisco José Viegas
- Ribatejo (1997), text by Hélder Pinho
- Norte Alentejano (1999), text by José Manuel Fernandes
- Retratos do Fim do Século (2000), text by António Barreto
- Alentejo (2002), text by Hélder Pinho
- Rio Douro - Da Nascente à Foz (2004), text by several authors
- Açores (2005), text by several authors
- Beira Litoral - Aveiro e Coimbra (2006), text by several authors
- Minho (2007), text by several authors

=== Projects by editors invitation ===
- Quintas e Palácios nos Arredores de Lisboa (1986), text by Anne de Stoop
- Terras do Norte na Literatura Portuguesa (1990), text by Luís Forjaz Trigueiros
- Viagem a Portugal (1990), travel book by José Saramago
- Terras da Beira na Literatura Portuguesa (1991), text by António Manuel Couto Viana
- Douro (1993), with Emílio Biel and Domingos Alvão, text by António Barreto
- Artesãos e Artesanato (1993), text by Isabel Victor and Luís Gonçalves
- As Beiras (1994), text by Jaime Cortesão
- Festas, Feiras e Romarias (1997), text by Fernando António Baptista Pereira, Ana Duarte and Luís Gonçalves
- Praias de Portugal (1997), text by Alice Vieira
- Albufeiras de Portugal (2000), text by António Carmona Rodrigues
- Lendas dos Açores (2007), text by José Viale Moutinho
- Lendas de Trás-os-Montes e Alto Douro (2007), text by José Viale Moutinho
