= Mateus Gregório =

Brazilian weightlifter (born 1993)

Personal information
- Full name: Mateus Filipe Gregório Machado
- Nationality: Brazilian
- Born: 5 July 1993 (age 32)
- Height: 1.85 m (6 ft 1 in)
- Weight: 104 kg (229 lb)

Sport
- Country: Brazil
- Sport: Weightlifting
Medal record
Representing Brazil
Pan American Games
Silver medal – second place	2015 Toronto	105 kg

Mateus Filipe Gregório Machado (born 5 July 1993) is a Brazilian Olympic weightlifter. He has qualified for the 2016 Summer Olympics. In 2018 he tested positive for Oxandrolone metabolites and was banned until 2022 by the International Weightlifting Federation.

== Results ==
Year	Event	Weight	Snatch (kg)	Clean & Jerk (kg)	Total (kg)	Rank
2012	Pan American Junior Championships	94 kg	140	160	300	5
2012	Pan American Championships	94 kg	137	170	307	11
2012	World Junior Championships	94 kg	137	170	307	11
2012	South American Junior Championships	94 kg	145	170	315	2
2012	South American Championships	94 kg	145	170	315	5
2013	World Junior Championships	105 kg	162	191	353	7
2013	Pan American Championships	105 kg	162	185	347	5
2013	South American Junior Championships	105 kg	160	185	345	1
2013	Pan American Junior Championships	105 kg	160	185	345	1
2013	World Championships	105 kg	160	192	352	15
2014	South American Games	105 kg	175	202	377	2
2014	Pan American Championships	105 kg	167	197	364	3
2014	World Championships	105 kg	170	200	370	20
2015	Pan American Games	105 kg	175	202	377	2
2015	World Championships	105 kg	NM	NM	0	—N/a
2015	South American Championships	+105 kg	160	200	360	2
2016	South American Championships & Test Event Rio 2016	105 kg	170	200	370	3
2016	Pan American Championships	105 kg	170	NM	0	—N/a
2016	Olympic Games	105 kg	170	NM	0	—N/a
2017	Pan American Championships	+105 kg	176	202	378	2
2017	South American Championships	105 kg	DNS	DNS	0	—N/a
