= United States at the 2015 Pan American Games =

- IOC code: USA
- NOC: United States Olympic Committee
- Website: www.teamusa.org

in Toronto, Canada July 10–26, 2015
- Competitors: 623 in 37 sports
- Flag bearer (opening): Kim Rhode
- Flag bearer (closing): Claressa Shields
- Medals Ranked 1st: Gold 103 Silver 82 Bronze 80 Total 265

Pan American Games appearances (overview)
- 1951; 1955; 1959; 1963; 1967; 1971; 1975; 1979; 1983; 1987; 1991; 1995; 1999; 2003; 2007; 2011; 2015; 2019; 2023

The United States competed at the 2015 Pan American Games in Toronto, Canada, from July 10 to 26, 2015.

On July 6, 2015, the United States Olympic Committee announced the full squad of 623 athletes (331 men and 302 women) that will compete in 34 sports. The United States will not compete in both handball and football (soccer).

Sport shooter Kim Rhode was named the flagbearer of the team during the opening ceremony, after being selected by her teammates.

== Medalists ==
The following U.S. competitors won medals at the games. In the by discipline sections below, medalists' names are bolded.

Medal	Name	Sport	Event	Date
Gold	Felicia Stancil	Cycling	Women's BMX	July 11
Gold	Marvin Kimble; Steven Legendre; Samuel Mikulak; Paul Ruggeri; Donnell Whittenburg	Gymnastics	Men's artistic team all-around	July 11
Gold	Eva Fabian	Swimming	Women's marathon 10 km	July 11
Gold	Laura Graves; Kimberly Herslow; Steffen Peters; Sabine Schut-Kery	Equestrian	Team dressage	July 12
Gold	Madison Desch; Rachel Gowey; Amelia Hundley; Emily Schild; Megan Skaggs	Gymnastics	Women's artistic team all-around	July 12
Gold	Marti Malloy	Judo	Women's 57 kg	July 12
Gold	Chip Peterson	Swimming	Men's marathon 10 km	July 12
Gold	Samuel Mikulak	Gymnastics	Men's artistic individual all-around	July 13
Gold	Molly Bruggeman; Emily Huelskamp	Rowing	Women's pair	July 13
Gold	Travis Stevens	Judo	Men's −81 kg	July 13
Gold	Connor Davis	Shooting	Men's 10 m air rifle	July 13
Gold	Amanda Sobhy	Squash	Women's singles	July 13
Gold	Steffen Peters	Equestrian	Individual dressage	July 14
Gold	Marvin Kimble	Gymnastics	Men's pommel horse	July 14
Gold	Rachel Gowey	Gymnastics	Women's uneven bars	July 14
Gold	Kayla Harrison	Judo	Women's −78 kg	July 14
Gold	Natalie Grainger; Amanda Sobhy	Squash	Women's doubles	July 14
Gold	United States women's national water polo team: Caroline Clark; Kameryn Craig; Rachel Fattal; Makenzie Fischer; Kaleigh Gilchrist; Ashley Grossman; Samantha Hill; Ashleigh Johnson; Courtney Mathewson; Madeline Musselman; Kiley Neushul; Melissa Seidemann; Margaret Steffens	Water polo	Women's tournament	July 14
Gold	Kendrick Farris	Weightlifting	Men's 94 kg	July 14
Gold	Phillip Chew; Sattawat Pongnairat	Badminton	Men's doubles	July 15
Gold	Eva Lee; Paula Lynn Obañana	Badminton	Women's doubles	July 15
Gold	Mary Jones	Rowing	Women's lightweight single sculls	July 15
Gold	Brad Balsley	Shooting	Men's 25 m rapid fire pistol	July 15
Gold	Sean Lehane	Swimming	Men's 200 m backstroke	July 15
Gold	Allison Schmitt	Swimming	Women's 200 m freestyle	July 15
Gold	United States men's national water polo team: Tony Azevedo; McQuin Baron; Bret Bonanni; Alex Bowen; Luca Cupido; Jackson Kimbell; John Mann; Merril Moses; Alex Obert; Alex Roelse; Josh Samuels; Jesse Smith; Nikola Vavic	Water polo	Men's tournament	July 15
Gold	Andy Bisek	Wrestling	Greco-Roman 75 kg	July 15
Gold	Jon Anderson	Wrestling	Greco-Roman 85 kg	July 15
Gold	Phillip Chew; Jamie Subandhi	Badminton	Mixed doubles	July 16
Gold	Giles Smith	Swimming	Men's 100 m butterfly	July 16
Gold	Kelsi Worrell	Swimming	Women's 100 m butterfly	July 16
Gold	Caitlin Leverenz	Swimming	Women's 400 m individual medley	July 16
Gold	Courtney Harnish; Kiera Janzen; Gillian Ryan; Allison Schmitt	Swimming	Women's 4 × 200 m freestyle relay	July 16
Gold	Whitney Conder	Wrestling	Women's freestyle 53 kg	July 16
Gold	Olivia Blatchford; Natalie Grainger; Amanda Sobhy	Squash	Women's team	July 17
Gold	Khatuna Lorig	Archery	Women's individual	July 18
Gold	Casey Eichfeld	Canoeing	Men's slalom C-1	July 19
Gold	Devin McEwan; Casey Eichfeld	Canoeing	Men's slalom C-2	July 19
Gold	Michael Smolen	Canoeing	Men's K-1	July 19
Gold	Eli Dershwitz	Fencing	Men's individual sabre	July 20
Gold	Dagmara Wozniak	Fencing	Women's individual sabre	July 20
Gold	Laura Zeng	Gymnastics	Women's rhythmic individual club	July 20
Gold	Laura Zeng	Gymnastics	Women's rhythmic individual ribbon	July 20
Gold	Kiana Eide; Alisa Kano; Natalie McGiffert; Jennifer Rokhman; Monica Rokhman; Kristen Shaldybin	Gymnastics	Women's rhythmic group 6 clubs + 2 hoops	July 20
Gold	Cheyenne Lewis	Taekwondo	Women's – 57 kg	July 20
Gold	Queen Harrison	Athletics	Women's 100 m hurdles	July 21
Gold	Katherine Holmes	Fencing	Women's individual epee	July 21
Gold	Lily Zhang; Jennifer Wu; Jiaqi Zheng	Table tennis	Women's team	July 21
Gold	Paige McPherson	Taekwondo	Women's 67 kg	July 21
Gold	Jeffery Henderson	Athletics	Men's long jump	July 22
Gold	Kibwe Johnson	Athletics	Men's hammer throw	July 22
Gold	Shamier Little	Athletics	Women's 400 m hurdles	July 22
Gold	Kelly Catlin	Cycling	Women's road time trial	July 22
Gold	Alexander Massialas	Fencing	Men's individual foil	July 22
Gold	Lee Kiefer	Fencing	Women's individual foil	July 22
Gold	Jackie Galloway	Taekwondo	Women's +67 kg	July 22
Gold	Thomas Scott	Karate	Men's -75 kg	July 24
Silver	John Burchfield	Roller sports	Men's free skating	July 12
Silver	United States women's national rugby sevens team: Megan Bonny; Irene Gardner; Hannah Lopez; Lauren Doyle; Kelly Griffin; Richelle Stephens; Joanne Fa'avesi; Kathryn Johnson; Kristen Thomas; Melissa Fowler; Leyla Kelter; Kate Zackary	Rugby sevens	Women's tournament	July 12
Silver	Jay Shi	Shooting	Men's 10 m air pistol	July 12
Silver	David Heron	Swimming	Men's marathon 10 km	July 12
Silver	Kevin McDowell	Triathlon	Men's	July 12
Silver	Madison Desch	Gymnastics	Women's artistic individual all-around	July 13
Silver	Erin Jackson	Roller sports	Women's 500 m	July 13
Silver	Lindsay Meyer; Nicole Ritchie	Rowing	Women's double sculls	July 13
Silver	Kayle Browning	Shooting	Women's trap	July 13
Silver	Olivia Blatchford	Squash	Women's singles	July 13
Silver	Laura Graves	Equestrian	Individual dressage	July 14
Silver	Donnell Whittenburg	Gymnastics	Men's floor	July 14
Silver	Donnell Whittenburg	Gymnastics	Men's rings	July 14
Silver	Colin Ethridge; Austin Meyer	Rowing	Men's lightweight double sculls	July 14
Silver	Katherine McFetridge	Rowing	Women's single sculls	July 14
Silver	Natalie Coughlin	Swimming	Women's 100 m freestyle	July 14
Silver	Kate Mills	Swimming	Women's 200 m butterfly	July 14
Silver	Natalie Coughlin; Madison Kennedy; Allison Schmitt; Amanda Weir	Swimming	Women's 4 × 100 m freestyle relay	July 14
Silver	Norik Vardanian	Weightlifting	Men's 94 kg	July 14
Silver	Donnell Whittenburg	Gymnastics	Men's vault	July 15
Silver	Megan Skaggs	Gymnastics	Women's balance beam	July 15
Silver	Amelia Hundley	Gymnastics	Women's floor	July 15
Silver	Peter Gibson; Matthew O'Donoghue; Robin Prendes; Andrew Weiland	Rowing	Men's lightweight four	July 15
Silver	Victoria Burke; Sarah Giancola; Lindsay Meyer; Nicole Ritchie	Rowing	Women's quadruple sculls	July 15
Silver	Sandra Uptagrafft	Shooting	Women's 25 m pistol	July 15
Silver	Carte Griffin	Swimming	Men's 200 m backstroke	July 15
Silver	Joseph Bentz; Michael Klueh; Darian Townsend; Michael Weiss	Swimming	Men's 4 × 200 m freestyle relay	July 15
Silver	Bryce Saddoris	Wrestling	Greco-Roman 66 kg	July 15
Silver	Brady Ellison; Zach Garrett; Collin Klimitchek	Archery	Men's team	July 17
Silver	Brady Ellison	Archery	Men's individual	July 18
Silver	Lindsay Flanagan	Athletics	Women's marathon	July 18
Silver	Colleen Hickey	Canoeing	Women's slalom C-1	July 19
Silver	United States women's national basketball team: Moriah Jefferson; Tiffany Mitchell; Linnae Harper; Kelsey Plum; Caroline Coyer; Shatori Walker; Breanna Stewart; Courtney Williams; Stephanie Mavunga; Taya Reimer; Sophie Brunner; Alaina Coates	Basketball	Women's tournament	July 20
Silver	Aron Rono	Athletics	Men's 10,000 m	July 21
Silver	Tenaya Jones	Athletics	Women's 100 m hurdles	July 21
Silver	Kara Winger	Athletics	Women's javelin throw	July 21
Silver	Amber Campbell	Athletics	Women's hammer throw	July 21
Silver	Marquise Goodwin	Athletics	Men's long jump	July 22
Silver	Alysia Montaño	Athletics	Women's 800 m	July 22
Silver	Jillian Camarena-Williams	Athletics	Women's shot put	July 22
Silver	Gerek Meinhardt	Fencing	Men's individual foil	July 22
Silver	Daniel Powers	Water skiing	Men's wakeboard	July 22
Silver	Regina Jaquess	Water skiing	Women's overall	July 22
Bronze	Nicholas Long	Cycling	Men's BMX	July 11
Bronze	Angelica Delgado	Judo	Women's 52 kg	July 11
Bronze	Mariya Koroleva; Alison Williams	Synchronized swimming	Women's duet	July 11
Bronze	Anita Alvarez; Claire Barton; Mary Killman; Mariya Koroleva; Sandra Ortellado; Sarah Rodriguez; Karensa Tjoa; Alison Williams	Synchronized swimming	Women's team	July 11
Bronze	Stephen Ettinger	Cycling	Men's cross-country	July 12
Bronze	Erin Huck	Cycling	Women's cross-country	July 12
Bronze	United States men's national rugby sevens team: Nate Augspurger; Will Holder; Ben Leatigaga; Perry Baker; Madison Huges; Mike Te'o; Garrett Bender; Martin Iosefo; Brett Thompson; Patrick Blair; Carlin Isles; Stephen Tomasin	Rugby sevens	Men's tournament	July 12
Bronze	Cory Bowersox; Zachary Nees	Diving	Men's 3 m synchronized springboard	July 13
Bronze	Deidre Freeman; Maren Taylor	Diving	Women's 3 m springboard	July 13
Bronze	Jacob Larsen	Judo	Men's −90 kg	July 13
Bronze	Darian O'Neil	Roller sports	Women's 10000 m points race	July 13
Bronze	Bryant Wallizer	Shooting	Men's 10 m air rifle	July 13
Bronze	Kimberly Bowers	Shooting	Women's trap	July 13
Bronze	Chris Gordon; Chris Hanson	Squash	Men's doubles	July 13
Bronze	Howard Shu	Badminton	Men's singles	July 14
Bronze	Jamie Subandhi	Badminton	Women's singles	July 14
Bronze	Iris Wang	Badminton	Women's singles	July 14
Bronze	Samuel Mikulak	Gymnastics	Men's floor	July 14
Bronze	Amelia Hundley	Gymnastics	Women's uneven bars	July 14
Bronze	Nina Cutro-Kelly	Judo	Women's +78 kg	July 14
Bronze	Victoria Burke; Sarah Giancola	Rowing	Women's lightweight double sculls	July 14
Bronze	Cullen Jones; Josh Schneider; Darian Townsend; Michael Weiss	Swimming	Men's 4 × 100 m freestyle relay	July 14
Bronze	Samuel Mikulak	Gymnastics	Men's parallel bars	July 15
Bronze	Paul Ruggeri	Gymnastics	Men's horizontal bar	July 15
Bronze	Taylor Brown; David Eick; Nareg Guregian; Brendan Harrington; Keane Johnson; Matthew Mahon; Sam Ojserkis; Kyle Peabody; Erick Winstead	Rowing	Men's eight	July 15
Bronze	Michael Weiss	Swimming	Men's 200 m freestyle	July 15
Bronze	Clara Smiddy	Swimming	Women's 200 m backstroke	July 15
Bronze	Annie Lazor	Swimming	Women's 200 m breaststroke	July 15
Bronze	Dennis Novikov	Tennis	Men's singles	July 15
Bronze	Spenser Mango	Wrestling	Greco-Roman 59 kg	July 15
Bronze	Chris Gordon; Chris Hanson; Todd Harrity	Squash	Men's team	July 16
Bronze	Max Williamson	Swimming	Men's 400 m individual medley	July 16
Bronze	Robby Smith	Wrestling	Greco-Roman 130 kg	July 16
Bronze	Alyssa Lampe	Wrestling	Women's freestyle 48 kg	July 16
Bronze	Ariel Gibilaro; Khatuna Lorig; La Nola Pritchard	Archery	Women's team	July 17
Bronze	Joseph Bentz	Swimming	Men's 200 m individual medley	July 18
Bronze	Ashley Nee	Canoeing	Women's slalom K-1	July 19
Bronze	Cory Leslie	Athletics	Men's 3000 m steeplechase	July 21
Bronze	Mark Hollis	Athletics	Men's pole vault	July 21
Bronze	Jacob Blankenship	Athletics	Men's pole vault	July 21
Bronze	Kellyn Taylor	Athletics	Women's 5000 m	July 21
Bronze	Jason Pryor	Fencing	Men's individual epee	July 21
Bronze	Steven Lopez	Taekwondo	Men's 80 kg	July 21
Bronze	Conor McCullough	Athletics	Men's hammer throw	July 22
Bronze	Barbara Pierre	Athletics	Women's 100 m	July 22
Bronze	Nicole Ross	Fencing	Women's individual foil	July 22
Bronze	Philip Yun	Taekwondo	Men's +80 kg	July 22
Bronze	Brandis Miyazaki	Karate	Men's -60 kg	July 23
Bronze	Brian Irr	Karate	Men's +84 kg	July 25

Medals by sport
**Sport**	1st place, gold medalist(s)	2nd place, silver medalist(s)	3rd place, bronze medalist(s)	**Total**
Swimming	14	11	10	35
Athletics	13	14	14	41
Gymnastics	11	13	5	29
Fencing	9	3	2	14
Wrestling	8	3	4	15
Equestrian	5	1	2	8
Shooting	4	6	3	13
Water skiing	3	3	2	8
Cycling	3	2	3	8
Squash	3	1	2	6
Canoeing	3	1	1	5
Badminton	3	0	3	6
Judo	3	0	3	6
Taekwondo	3	0	2	5
Rowing	2	5	2	9
Racquetball	2	2	2	6
Beach volleyball	2	1	2	5
Table tennis	2	0	1	3
Water polo	2	0	0	2
Sailing	1	2	3	6
Archery	1	2	1	4
Bowling	1	1	3	5
Baseball	1	1	0	2
Weightlifting	1	1	0	2
Karate	1	0	2	3
Field hockey	1	0	0	1
Volleyball	1	0	0	1
Roller sports	0	2	1	3
Golf	0	2	0	2
Basketball	0	1	1	2
Rugby sevens	0	1	1	2
Softball	0	1	0	1
Triathlon	0	1	1	2
Diving	0	0	2	2
Synchronized swimming	0	0	2	2
Modern pentathlon	0	0	1	1
Tennis	0	0	1	1
Total	103	81	81	265

Medals by day
**Day**	1st place, gold medalist(s)	2nd place, silver medalist(s)	3rd place, bronze medalist(s)	**Total**
July 11	3	0	4	7
July 12	4	5	3	12
July 13	5	5	7	17
July 14	7	9	8	24
July 15	9	9	8	26
July 16	6	0	4	10
July 17	6	6	6	18
July 18	10	7	4	21
July 19	9	12	4	25
July 20	6	2	1	9
July 21	4	4	6	14
July 22	7	6	5	18
July 23	7	4	12	23
July 24	10	4	2	16
July 25	9	5	7	21
July 26	1	3	0	4
Total	103	81	81	265

Medals by gender
**Gender**	1st place, gold medalist(s)	2nd place, silver medalist(s)	3rd place, bronze medalist(s)	**Total**
Male	44	37	45	126
Female	59	44	36	139
Total	103	81	81	265

Multiple medalists
**Name**	**Sport**	1st place, gold medalist(s)	2nd place, silver medalist(s)	3rd place, bronze medalist(s)	**Total**
Samuel Mikulak	Gymnastics	2	0	2	4
Donnell Whittenburg	Gymnastics	1	3	0	4
Allison Schmitt	Swimming	2	1	0	3
Amanda Sobhy	Squash	3	0	0	3
Amelia Hundley	Gymnastics	1	1	1	3
Phillip Chew	Badminton	2	0	0	2
Casey Eichfeld	Canoeing	2	0	0	2
Rachel Gowey	Gymnastics	2	0	0	2
Natalie Grainger	Squash	2	0	0	2
Marvin Kimble	Gymnastics	2	0	0	2
Steffen Peters	Equestrian	2	0	0	2
Laura Zeng	Gymnastics	2	0	0	2
Olivia Blatchford	Squash	1	1	0	2
Madison Desch	Gymnastics	1	1	0	2
Laura Graves	Equestrian	1	1	0	2
Megan Skaggs	Gymnastics	1	1	0	2
Khatuna Lorig	Archery	1	0	1	2
Paul Ruggeri	Gymnastics	1	0	1	2
Jamie Subandhi	Badminton	1	0	1	2
Natalie Coughlin	Swimming	0	2	0	2
Brady Ellison	Archery	0	2	0	2
Lindsay Meyer	Rowing	0	2	0	2
Nicole Ritchie	Rowing	0	2	0	2
Joseph Bentz	Swimming	0	1	1	2
Chris Gordon	Squash	0	0	2	2
Chris Hanson	Squash	0	0	2	2
Mariya Koroleva	Synchronized swimming	0	0	2	2
Michael Weiss	Swimming	0	0	2	2
Alison Williams	Synchronized swimming	0	0	2	2

== Archery ==
The United States has qualified the maximum team of three men and three women, for a total of six athletes.

Men

Athlete	Event	Ranking Round		Round of 32	Round of 16	Quarterfinals	Semifinals	Final / BM	Rank
Athlete	Event	Score	Seed	Opposition Score	Opposition Score	Opposition Score	Opposition Score	Opposition Score	Rank
Brady Ellison	Individual	664	3	Cannelli (ARG); W 6–2	Malavé (VEN); W 6–5	Stevens (CUB); W 6–0	Lyon (CAN); W 6–0	Álvarez (MEX); L 4–7	2nd place, silver medalist(s)
Zach Garrett	Individual	673	1	Alfonseca (DOM); W 7–1	Robles (ARG); W 6–2	Flossbach (GUA); W 6–2	Álvarez (MEX); L 3–7	Lyon (CAN); L 0–6	4
Collin Klimitchek	Individual	669	2	Alvarez (CHI); W 7–1	Lyon (CAN); L 2–6	Did not advance			
Brady Ellison; Zach Garrett; Collin Klimitchek	Team	2006	1	—N/a		Bye	Brazil; W 6–0	Mexico; L 2–6	2nd place, silver medalist(s)

Women

Athlete	Event	Ranking Round		Round of 32	Round of 16	Quarterfinals	Semifinals	Final / BM	Rank
Athlete	Event	Score	Seed	Opposition Score	Opposition Score	Opposition Score	Opposition Score	Opposition Score	Rank
Ariel Gibilaro	Individual	646	6	Leithold Juarez (ARG); W 6–4	Pritchard (USA); L 1–7	Did not advance			
Khatuna Lorig	Individual	651	3	Abullarade (ESA); W 6–2	Vrakking (CAN); W 6–5	Pritchard (USA); W 7–3	Román (MEX); W 6–5	Rendón (COL); W 6–2	1st place, gold medalist(s)
La Nola Pritchard	Individual	623	11	Mendez (VEN); W 7–1	Gibilaro (USA); W 7–1	Lorig (USA); L 3–7	Did not advance		
Ariel Gibilaro; Khatuna Lorig; La Nola Pritchard	Team	1920	2	—N/a	Bye	Cuba; W 5–3	Colombia; L 2–6	Venezuela; W 5–4	3rd place, bronze medalist(s)

== Athletics (track and field) ==
Men
Track & road events

Athlete	Event	Heats		Semifinals		Final	
Athlete	Event	Time	Rank	Time	Rank	Time	Rank
BeeJay Lee	100 m	9.99	1 Q	10.15	4 q	10.17	6
Remontay McClain	100 m	9.99	2 Q	10.11	2 Q	10.15	5
BeeJay Lee	200 m	20.34	3 Q	20.23	5 q	20.74	8
Wallace Spearmon	200 m	20.49	2 Q	20.03	2 Q	20.11	5
Marcus Chambers	400 m	—N/a		46.91	7	Did not advance	
Kyle Clemons	400 m	—N/a		45.75	2 Q	44.84	3rd place, bronze medalist(s)
Ryan Martin	800 m	—N/a		1:48.99	1 Q	1:47.73	3rd place, bronze medalist(s)
Clayton Murphy	800 m	—N/a		1:48.88	1 Q	1:47.19	1st place, gold medalist(s)
Kyle Merber	1500 m	—N/a				3:43.60	7
Andrew Wheating	1500 m	—N/a				3:41.41	1st place, gold medalist(s)
Garrett Heath	5000 m	—N/a				13:47.17	4
David Torrence	5000 m	—N/a				13:46.60	2nd place, silver medalist(s)
Shadrack Kipchirchir	10000 m	—N/a				29:01.55	4
Aron Rono	10000 m	—N/a				28:50.83	2nd place, silver medalist(s)
David Oliver	110 m hurdles	—N/a		13.15	1 Q	13.07 PR	1st place, gold medalist(s)
Ray Stewart	110 m hurdles	—N/a		13.62	4	Did not advance	
Jeshua Anderson	400 m hurdles	—N/a		49.73	1 Q	48.95	5
Kerron Clement	400 m hurdles	—N/a		50.63	1 Q	48.72	4
Donald Cowart	3000 m steeplechase	—N/a				8:49.00	4
Cory Leslie	3000 m steeplechase	—N/a				8:36.83	3rd place, bronze medalist(s)
BeeJay Lee; Remontay McClain; Sean McLean^{*} Wallace Spearmon; Kendal Williams	4 × 100 m relay	—N/a		38.29	2 Q	38.27	1st place, gold medalist(s)
Jeshua Anderson^{*} Marcus Chambers; Kerron Clement; Kyle Clemons; James Harris	4 × 400 m relay	—N/a		3:02.99	1 Q	3:00.21	2nd place, silver medalist(s)
Craig Leon	Marathon	—N/a				2:19:26	5
Tim Young	Marathon	—N/a				2:29:34	6
John Nunn	50 km walk	—N/a				DNF	

Key: Q=Qualified for next round based on position in heat; q=Qualified for next round as fastest loser; *=Athlete ran in a preliminary round but not the final

Field events

Athlete	Event	Qualification		Final	
Athlete	Event	Distance	Rank	Distance	Rank
Marquise Goodwin	Long jump	8.05	1 Q	8.27	2nd place, silver medalist(s)
Jeff Henderson	Long jump	8.18	1 Q	8.54	1st place, gold medalist(s)
Alphonso Jordan	Triple jump	—N/a		15.99	12
Jeron Robinson	High jump	—N/a		2.28	4
Jesse Williams	High jump	—N/a		2.28	4
Jacob Blankenship	Pole vault	—N/a		5.40	3rd place, bronze medalist(s)
Mark Hollis	Pole vault	—N/a		5.40	3rd place, bronze medalist(s)
Darrell Hill	Shot put	—N/a		20.10	4
Jonathan Jones	Shot put	—N/a		19.88	5
Jared Schuurmans	Discus throw	—N/a		62.32	4
Russell Winger	Discus throw	—N/a		62.64	3rd place, bronze medalist(s)
Riley Dolezal	Javelin throw	—N/a		81.62	2nd place, silver medalist(s)
Sean Furey	Javelin throw	—N/a		77.41	5
Kibwe Johnson	Hammer throw	—N/a		75.46	1st place, gold medalist(s)
Conor McCullough	Hammer throw	—N/a		73.74	3rd place, bronze medalist(s)

Key: Q=Qualify for final based on position in group; q=Qualify for final based on position in field without meeting qualifying mark

Combined event – Decathlon

Athlete	Event	100 m	LJ	SP	HJ	400 m	110 H	DT	PV	JT	1500 m	Final	Rank
Austin Bahner	Result	10.87	7.27	12.47	1.85	50.36	15.74	42.35	4.60	54.67	4:43.53	7451	8
Austin Bahner	Points	890	878	635	670	798	762	712	790	658	658	7451	8
Derek Masterson	Result	11.43	6.49	14.58	1.88	52.32	15.20	47.50	4.80	55.30	4:45.81	7436	9
Derek Masterson	Points	767	695	764	696	711	825	818	849	667	644	7436	9

Women
Track & road events

Athlete	Event	Heats		Semifinals		Final	
Athlete	Event	Time	Rank	Time	Rank	Time	Rank
Morolake Aknosun	100 m	11.12	3 Q	11.29	7	Did not advance	
Barbara Pierre	100 m	10.92 PR	1 Q	10.96	1 Q	11.01	3rd place, bronze medalist(s)
Kyra Jefferson	200 m	23.00	2 Q	22.65	3 Q	22.72	2nd place, silver medalist(s)
Kaylin Whitney	200 m	22.88	3 Q	22.68	1 Q	22.65	1st place, gold medalist(s)
Kendall Baisden	400 m	—N/a		51.81	1 Q	51.27	1st place, gold medalist(s)
Shakima Wimbley	400 m	—N/a		52.28	1 Q	51.36	2nd place, silver medalist(s)
Alysia Montaño	800 m	—N/a		2:02.95	2 Q	1:59.76	2nd place, silver medalist(s)
Phoebe Wright	800 m	—N/a		2:04.88	3 Q	2:04.17	7
Cory McGee	1500 m	—N/a				4:11.12	4
Kellyn Taylor	5000 m	—N/a				15:52.78	3rd place, bronze medalist(s)
Alisha Williams	5000 m	—N/a				16:01.59	5
Liz Costello	10000 m	—N/a				32:53.52	4
Desiree Linden	10000 m	—N/a				32:43.99	2nd place, silver medalist(s)
Queen Harrison	100 m hurdles	—N/a		12.72	1 Q	12.52 PR	1st place, gold medalist(s)
Tenaya Jones	100 m hurdles	—N/a		12.81	1 Q	12.84	2nd place, silver medalist(s)
Kori Carter	400 m hurdles	—N/a		DNS		Did not advance	
Shamier Little	400 m hurdles	—N/a		56.08	1 Q	55.50	1st place, gold medalist(s)
Ashley Higginson	3000 m steeplechase	—N/a				9:48.12 PR	1st place, gold medalist(s)
Shalaya Kipp	3000 m steeplechase	—N/a				9:49.96	2nd place, silver medalist(s)
Morolake Akinosun; Lakeisha Lawson; Barbara Pierre; Kaylin Whitney	4 × 100 m relay	—N/a		43.07	1 Q	42.58 PR	1st place, gold medalist(s)
Kendall Baisden; Kyra Jefferson; Shamier Little; Alysia Montaño^{*} Shakima Wimbley	4 × 400 m relay	—N/a		3:26.40	1 Q	3:25.68	1st place, gold medalist(s)
Sarah Cummings	Marathon	—N/a				DNF	
Lindsay Flanagan	Marathon	—N/a				2:36:30	2nd place, silver medalist(s)
Miranda Melville	20 km walk	—N/a				1:37:45	10
Maria Michta	20 km walk	—N/a				1:33:07	7

Key: Q=Qualified for next round based on position in heat; q=Qualified for next round as fastest loser; *=Athlete ran in a preliminary round but not the final

Field events

Athlete	Event	Qualification		Final	
Athlete	Event	Distance	Rank	Distance	Rank
Quanesha Burks	Long jump	—N/a		6.47	8
Sha'Keela Saunders	Long jump	—N/a		6.66	3rd place, bronze medalist(s)
Christina Epps	Triple jump	—N/a		16.85	7
April Sinkler	Triple jump	—N/a		13.16	13
Elizabeth Patterson	High jump	—N/a		1.80	11
Maya Pressley	High jump	—N/a		1.88	4
Demi Payne	Pole vault	—N/a		4.50	4
Jennifer Suhr	Pole vault	—N/a		4.60	3rd place, bronze medalist(s)
Jillian Camarena-Williams	Shot put	—N/a		18.65	2nd place, silver medalist(s)
Jeneva Stevens	Shot put	—N/a		17.63	6
Kelsey Card	Discus throw	—N/a		57.00	7
Gia Lewis-Smallwood	Discus throw	—N/a		61.26	3rd place, bronze medalist(s)
Hannah Carson	Javelin throw	—N/a		51.93	8
Kara Winger	Javelin throw	—N/a		61.44	2nd place, silver medalist(s)
Amber Campbell	Hammer throw	—N/a		71.22	2nd place, silver medalist(s)
DeAnna Price	Hammer throw	—N/a		68.84	4

Key: Q=Qualify for final based on position in group; q=Qualify for final based on position in field without meeting qualifying mark

Combined event – Heptathlon

Athlete	Event	100 H	HJ	SP	200 m	LJ	JT	800 m	Final	Rank
Breanna Leslie	Result	13.73	1.68	11.85	24.58	6.28	40.84	2:13.25	5844	6
Breanna Leslie	Points	1017	830	651	926	937	683	918	5844	6
Heather Miller	Result	13.66	1.80	12.34	24.30	5.90	40.31	2:12.57	6178	2nd place, silver medalist(s)
Heather Miller	Points	1027	978	684	952	819	655	927	6178	2nd place, silver medalist(s)

== Badminton ==
The United States has qualified a full team of eight athletes.

Men

Athlete	Event	Round of 64	Round of 32	Round of 16	Quarterfinals	Semifinals	Final	
Athlete	Event	Opposition Score	Opposition Score	Opposition Score	Opposition Score	Opposition Score	Opposition Score	Rank
Sattawat Pongnairat	Singles	Bye	Bonkowsky (TTO); W 21–8, 21–11	Humblers (GUA); W 21–13, 11–21, 21–8	D'Souza (CAN); L 14–21, 10–21	Did not advance		
Bjorn Seguin	Singles	Bye	Darmohoetomo (SUR); W 21–7, 21–9	Muñoz (MEX); L 18–21, 9–21	Did not advance			
Howard Shu	Singles	Bye	Veliz (CUB); W 21–12, 21–13	Cabrera (DOM); W 21–9, 21–14	Paiola (BRA); W 21–12, 16–21, 21–18	Cordón (GUA); L 21–16, 14–21, 18–21	Did not advance	3rd place, bronze medalist(s)
Phillip Chew; Sattawat Pongnairat	Doubles	—N/a		Bye	Henry; Reid (JAM); W 21–14, 21–17	Castillo; Muñoz (MEX); W 21–19, 21–13	Arthuso; Paiola (BRA); W 21–18, 21–16	1st place, gold medalist(s)

Women

Athlete	Event	Round of 64	Round of 32	Round of 16	Quarterfinals	Semifinals	Final	
Athlete	Event	Opposition Score	Opposition Score	Opposition Score	Opposition Score	Opposition Score	Opposition Score	Rank
Jamie Subandhi	Singles	Bye	Corleto (GUA); W 21–5, 21–2	Polanco (DOM); W 21–13, 21–6	Gaitan (MEX); W 21–12, 21–11	Li (CAN); L 11–21, 21–19, 15–21	Did not advance	3rd place, bronze medalist(s)
Iris Wang	Singles	Bye	Ortiz Parada (VEN); W 21–4, 21–6	Vicente (BRA); W 21–8, 21–12	Macias (PER); W 21–9, 21–6	Honderich (CAN); L 15–21, 11–21	Did not advance	3rd place, bronze medalist(s)
Eva Lee; Paula Lynn Obañana	Doubles	—N/a		Bye	Macias; Nishimura (PER); W 21–6, 21–10	Honderich; Li (CAN); W 21–11, 21–8	Vicente; Vicente (BRA); W 21–14, 21–6	1st place, gold medalist(s)

Mixed

Athlete	Event	Round of 32	Round of 16	Quarterfinals	Semifinals	Final / BM	
Athlete	Event	Opposition Score	Opposition Score	Opposition Score	Opposition Score	Opposition Score	Rank
Phillip Chew; Jamie Subandhi	Doubles	Bye	González; Muñoz (MEX); W 21–9, 21–17	Cabrera; Polanco (DOM); W 21–9, 21–8	Cuba; Winder (PER); W 21–18, 21–14	Bruce; Ng (CAN); W 21–9, 21–23, 21–2	1st place, gold medalist(s)

== Baseball ==
The United States has qualified a men's baseball team, of 24 athletes. The United States will also enter a women's team of 18 athletes, for a total of 42 entered competitors.

=== Men's tournament ===
The United States announced their squad on June 29, 2015. The position of the player is listed in parentheses.

- Albert Almora (OF)
- Jake Barrett (P)
- Buddy Baumann (P)
- Jeff Bianchi (IF/OF)
- Aaron Blair (P)
- Brian Bogusevic (OF)
- Casey Coleman (P)
- Zach Eflin (P)
- Brian Ellington (P)
- Cam Gallagher (C)
- Josh Hader (P)
- David Huff (P)
- Travis Jankowski (OF)
- Patrick Kivlehan (OF)
- Casey Kotchman (IF)
- Scott McGregor (P)
- Tommy Murphy (C)
- Andy Parrino (INF)
- Tyler Pastornicky (INF)
- Paul Sewald (P)
- Nate Smith (P)
- Jake Thompson (P)
- Johnathan Williamson (OF)
- Jacob Wilson (INF)

Legend: C = Catcher, INF = Infielder, OF = Outfielder, P = Pitcher

Group A

Pos	Team	Pld	W	L	RF	RA	RD	PCT	GB	Qualification
1	Canada	6	5	1	38	15	+23	.833	—	Advance to the semifinals
2	United States	6	4	2	33	22	+11	.667 (Note: In the 3-way tie for 2nd place, all three teams went 1-1 head to head. The 2nd tiebreaker, Team Quality Balance, was used to identify and eliminate the last team in the group (Puerto Rico). The tie between the other two teams was then broken on the basis of the head-to-head result between them (United States defeating Cuba).)	1	Advance to the semifinals
3	Cuba	6	4	2	41	23	+18	.667	1	Advance to the semifinals
4	Puerto Rico	6	4	2	40	44	−4	.667	1	Advance to the semifinals
5	Dominican Republic	6	3	3	30	35	−5	.500	2	
6	Nicaragua	6	1	5	22	43	−21	.167	4	
7	Colombia	6	0	6	22	44	−22	.000	5	

Notes:

11 July 2015; 15:30	United States	9–10	Puerto Rico	President’s Choice Ajax Pan Am Ballpark – Second Field, Ajax; Attendance: 400
11 July 2015; 15:30		Boxscore		President’s Choice Ajax Pan Am Ballpark – Second Field, Ajax; Attendance: 400

12 July 2015; 19:00	United States	5–2	Cuba	President’s Choice Ajax Pan Am Ballpark – Main Field, Ajax; Attendance: 4,209
12 July 2015; 19:00		Boxscore		President’s Choice Ajax Pan Am Ballpark – Main Field, Ajax; Attendance: 4,209

13 July 2015; 15:30	Colombia	3–5	United States	President’s Choice Ajax Pan Am Ballpark – Second Field, Ajax; Attendance: 1,400
13 July 2015; 15:30		Boxscore		President’s Choice Ajax Pan Am Ballpark – Second Field, Ajax; Attendance: 1,400

15 July 2015; 12:00	Nicaragua	0–6	United States	President’s Choice Ajax Pan Am Ballpark – Main Field, Ajax; Attendance: 1,038
15 July 2015; 12:00		Boxscore		President’s Choice Ajax Pan Am Ballpark – Main Field, Ajax; Attendance: 1,038

16 July 2015; 12:00	United States	4–6	Dominican Republic	President’s Choice Ajax Pan Am Ballpark – Main Field, Ajax; Attendance: 1,453
16 July 2015; 12:00		Boxscore		President’s Choice Ajax Pan Am Ballpark – Main Field, Ajax; Attendance: 1,453

17 July 2015; 19:00	Canada	1–4	United States	President’s Choice Ajax Pan Am Ballpark – Main Field, Ajax; Attendance: 4,761
17 July 2015; 19:00		Boxscore		President’s Choice Ajax Pan Am Ballpark – Main Field, Ajax; Attendance: 4,761

Semifinal

18 July 2015; 13:00	United States	6–5	Cuba	President’s Choice Ajax Pan Am Ballpark – Main Field, Ajax; Attendance: 4,702
18 July 2015; 13:00		Boxscore		President’s Choice Ajax Pan Am Ballpark – Main Field, Ajax; Attendance: 4,702

Gold medal game

19 July 2015; 19:00	(gold) Canada	7–6 (10)	United States (silver)	President’s Choice Ajax Pan Am Ballpark – Main Field, Ajax; Attendance: 5,489
19 July 2015; 19:00		Boxscore		President’s Choice Ajax Pan Am Ballpark – Main Field, Ajax; Attendance: 5,489

=== Women's tournament ===
The United States women's national baseball team announced their roster for the 2015 Pan American Games on May 24, 2015. The final roster as of July 19, 2015 is listed below.

- Veronica Alvarez (C)
- Ryleigh Buck (P/IF)
- Samantha Cobb (P/OF)
- Alex Fulmer (P)
- Veronica Gajownik (P/IF)
- Brittany Gomez (OF)
- Jade Gortarez (P/IF)
- Tamara Holmes (OF)
- Sarah Hudek (P/OF)
- Anna Kimbrell (P/C)
- Jenna Marston (P/IF)
- Stacy Piagno (P)
- Nicole Rivera (P/IF)
- Cydnee Sanders (P/IF)
- Marti Sementelli (P)
- Michelle Snyder (P/IF)
- Malaika Underwood (IF)
- Kelsie Whitmore (P/OF)

Legend: C = Catcher, IF = Infielder, OF = Outfielder, P = Pitcher

Group A

Pos	Team	Pld	W	L	RF	RA	RD	PCT	GB	Qualification
1	United States	4	4	0	33	7	+26	1.000	—	Advanced to the Gold medal match
2	Canada	4	3	1	26	9	+17	.750	1	Advance to the Bronze medal match
3	Venezuela	4	2	2	32	30	+2	.500	2	Advance to the Bronze medal match
4	Puerto Rico	4	1	3	17	27	−10	.250	3	
5	Cuba	4	0	4	8	43	−35	.000	4	

20 July 2015; 15:00	United States	10–6	Venezuela	President’s Choice Ajax Pan Am Ballpark, Ajax; Attendance: 847
20 July 2015; 15:00		Boxscore		President’s Choice Ajax Pan Am Ballpark, Ajax; Attendance: 847

22 July 2015; 19:00	United States	11–0	Cuba	President’s Choice Ajax Pan Am Ballpark, Ajax; Attendance: 773
22 July 2015; 19:00		Boxscore		President’s Choice Ajax Pan Am Ballpark, Ajax; Attendance: 773

23 July 2015; 19:00	Puerto Rico	0–9	United States	President’s Choice Ajax Pan Am Ballpark, Ajax; Attendance: 547
23 July 2015; 19:00		Boxscore		President’s Choice Ajax Pan Am Ballpark, Ajax; Attendance: 547

24 July 2015; 19:00	Canada	1–3	United States	President’s Choice Ajax Pan Am Ballpark, Ajax; Attendance: 3,469
24 July 2015; 19:00		Boxscore		President’s Choice Ajax Pan Am Ballpark, Ajax; Attendance: 3,469

Gold medal game

26 July 2015; 12:00	(silver) Canada	3–11	United States (gold)	President’s Choice Ajax Pan Am Ballpark, Ajax; Attendance: 5,224
26 July 2015; 12:00		Boxscore		President’s Choice Ajax Pan Am Ballpark, Ajax; Attendance: 5,224

== Basketball ==
The United States has qualified a men's and women's teams. Each team will consist of 12 athletes, for a total of 24.

=== Men's tournament ===
The United States men's national basketball team roster for the 2015 Pan American Games.

United States men's national basketball team – 2015 Pan American Games roster
Players
Coaches

Pos.	No.	Name	Age – Date of birth	Height	Club
PG	4	Trimble, Melo	20 – 2 Feb 1995	1.91 m (6 ft 3 in)	(United States) Maryland
SG	5	Langford, Keith	31 – 15 Sep 1983	1.93 m (6 ft 4 in)	(Russia) UNICS Kazan
PG	6	Brown, Bobby	30 – 24 Sep 1984	1.88 m (6 ft 2 in)	(China) Dongguan Leopards
SG	7	Baker, Ron	22 – 30 Mar 1993	1.93 m (6 ft 4 in)	(United States) Wichita State
PG	8	Brogdon, Malcolm	22 – 11 Dec 1992	1.96 m (6 ft 5 in)	(United States) Virginia
SG	9	Valentine, Denzel	21 – 16 Nov 1993	1.93 m (6 ft 4 in)	(United States) Michigan State
PF	10	Long, Shawn	22 – 29 Jan 1993	2.06 m (6 ft 9 in)	(United States) Louisiana–Lafayette
PF	11	Randolph, Anthony	26 – 15 Jul 1989	2.11 m (6 ft 11 in)	(Russia) Lokomotiv Kuban
SG	12	Wilkins, Damien	35 – 11 Jan 1980	1.98 m (6 ft 6 in)	(Puerto Rico) Indios de Mayagüez
C	13	Tarczewski, Kaleb	22 – 26 May 1993	2.13 m (7 ft 0 in)	(United States) Arizona
SF	14	Prince, Taurean	21 – 22 Mar 1994	2.01 m (6 ft 7 in)	(United States) Baylor
C	15	Hollins, Ryan	30 – 10 Oct 1984	2.13 m (7 ft 0 in)	(United States) Sacramento Kings

Head coach

(United States) Mark Few

Legend

- Age – as of 16 July 2015
- Club – before start of Games

Group A

Team	Pld	W	L	PF	PA	PD	Pts	Qualification
Brazil	3	3	0	264	206	+58	6	Qualified for the semifinals
United States	3	2	1	270	225	+45	5	Qualified for the semifinals
Puerto Rico	3	1	2	218	266	−48	4	
Venezuela	3	0	3	198	253	−55	3	

21 July 2015
21:00

Report

United States	85–62	Venezuela
Scoring by quarter: 18–18, 15–23, 26–12, 26–9
Pts: Wilkins 21; Rebs: Tarczewski 13; Asts: Brown 2		Pts: Cox, Bethelmy 14; Rebs: Bethelmy, Colmenares 8 Asts: Guillén 3

Ryerson Athletic Centre, Toronto

22 July 2015
21:00

Report

Puerto Rico	70–102	United States
Scoring by quarter: 19–29, 10–36, 23–20, 18–27
Pts: Mojica 15; Rebs: Villafañe 8 Asts: Barea 3		Pts: Brown 16; Rebs: Tarczewski 7 Asts: Brown 6

Ryerson Athletic Centre, Toronto

23 July 2015
21:00

Report

United States	83–93	Brazil
Scoring by quarter: 17–24, 21–23, 19–28, 26–18
Pts: Langford 17; Rebs: Prince, Tarczewski 5 Asts: Brown 2		Pts: Benite 34; Rebs: Lima 8 Asts: Batista, Luz, Meindl 3

Ryerson Athletic Centre, Toronto

Semifinal

24 July 2015
18:00

Report

United States	108–111 (OT)	Canada
Scoring by quarter: 23–24, 24–28, 33–22, 17–23, Overtime: 11–14
Pts: Brown 25; Rebs: Randolph 6 Asts: Brown 7		Pts: Nicholson 31; Rebs: Bennett 14; Asts: Murray 6

Ryerson Athletic Centre, Toronto

Bronze medal game

25 July 2015
11:00

Report

Dominican Republic	82–87	United States (bronze)
Scoring by quarter: 26–15, 22–20, 20–24, 14–28
Pts: Stokley 16; Rebs: Santana 10; Asts: Dicent 8		Pts: Brown 19; Rebs: Prince 7 Asts: Brown 5

Ryerson Athletic Centre, Toronto

=== Women's tournament ===
The following is the United States roster in the women's basketball tournament of the 2015 Pan American Games.

United States women's national basketball team - 2015 Pan American Games roster
Players
Coaches

Pos.	No.	Name	Age – Date of birth	Height	Club
G	4	Moriah Jefferson	21 – March 8, 1994	1.70 m (5 ft 7 in)	Connecticut Huskies	(United States)
G	5	Tiffany Mitchell	20 – September 23, 1994	1.75 m (5 ft 9 in)	South Carolina Camecocks	(United States)
G	6	Linnae Harper	20 – January 31, 1995	1.73 m (5 ft 8 in)	Kentucky Wildcats	(United States)
G	7	Kelsey Plum	20 – August 24, 1994	1.73 m (5 ft 8 in)	Washington Huskies	(United States)
G	8	Caroline Coyer	21 – October 27, 1993	1.78 m (5 ft 10 in)	Villanova Wildcats	(United States)
G	9	Shatori Walker-Kimbrough	20 – May 18, 1995	1.81 m (5 ft 11 in)	Maryland Terrapins	(United States)
G	10	Breanna Stewart	20 – August 27, 1994	1.93 m (6 ft 4 in)	Connecticut Huskies	(United States)
G	11	Courtney Williams	21 – March 24, 1994	1.86 m (6 ft 1 in)	Texas A&M Aggies	(United States)
F	12	Stephanie Mavunga	20 – February 24, 1995	1.91 m (6 ft 3 in)	North Carolina Tar Heels	(United States)
F	13	Taya Reimer	19 – August 24, 1995	1.91 m (6 ft 3 in)	Notre Dame Fighting Irish	(United States)
F	14	Sophie Brunner	19 – August 30, 1995	1.85 m (6 ft 1 in)	Arizona State Sun Devils	(United States)
C	15	Alaina Coates	20 – April 7, 1995	1.95 m (6 ft 5 in)	South Carolina Camecocks	(United States)

Head coach

- Lisa Bluder

Assistant coach(es)

- Michelle Clark-Heard
- Scott Rueck

Legend

- Club – describes last
  club before the tournament
- Age – describes age
  on 15 July 2015

Group A

Team	Pld	W	L	PF	PA	PD	Pts	Qualification
United States	3	3	0	262	201	+61	6	Qualified for the semifinals
Brazil	3	2	1	204	186	+18	5	Qualified for the semifinals
Puerto Rico	3	1	2	210	209	+1	4	
Dominican Republic	3	0	3	163	243	−80	3	

16 July 2015
21:00

Report

United States	75–69	Brazil
Scoring by quarter: 25–17, 14–14, 18–19, 18–19
Pts: Stewart 26; Rebs: Stewart 12; Asts: Jefferson 3		Pts: Teixeira 18; Rebs: Santos 11; Asts: Teixeira 2

Ryerson Athletic Centre, Toronto

17 July 2015
21:00

Report

Dominican Republic	55–94	United States
Scoring by quarter: 6–32, 15–16, 16–27, 18–19
Pts: Guzman 14; Rebs: Martinez 7 Asts: Guzman, Martinez 3		Pts: Stewart 16; Rebs: Reimer, Brunner 6 Asts: Plum 5

Ryerson Athletic Centre, Toronto

18 July 2015
21:00

Report

United States	93–77	Puerto Rico
Scoring by quarter: 24–23, 22–18, 21–23, 26–13
Pts: Stewart 24; Rebs: Coates 13; Asts: Jefferson 6		Pts: Cortijo Sanchez 24; Rebs: Gibson, García, Martinez 3 Asts: Cortijo Sanchez 5

Ryerson Athletic Centre, Toronto

Semifinal

19 July 2015
13:30

Report

Cuba	64–65	United States
Scoring by quarter: 17–18, 20–8, 11–20, 16–19
Pts: Casanova, Noblet 15; Rebs: Ochoa, Noblet 10; Asts: Gelis 3		Pts: Harper 16; Rebs: Coates 15; Asts: Jefferson 5

Ryerson Athletic Centre, Toronto

Gold medal game

20 July 2015
20:45

Report

(silver) United States	73–81	Canada (gold)
Scoring by quarter: 23–13, 13–23, 15–26, 22–19
Pts: Stewart 17; Rebs: Stewart 11; Asts: Jefferson 2		Pts: Nurse 33; Rebs: Fields 7 Asts: Nurse, Tatham 3

Ryerson Athletic Centre, Toronto

== Bowling ==
The United States has qualified a full team of 2 men and 2 women.

Athlete	Event	Qualification/Final																Round robin											Semifinals	Final	
Athlete	Event	Block 1							Block 2							Total	Rank	Round robin											Semifinals	Final	
Athlete	Event	1	2	3	4	5	6	Total	7	8	9	10	11	12	Total	Total	Rank	1	2	3	4	5	6	7	8	Total	Grand Total	Rank	Opposition Result	Opposition Result	Rank
Devin Bidwell	Men's singles	192	212	256	256	236	237	1389	214	237	244	247	212	210	1364	2753	1 Q	151	247	206	208	170	236	170	191	1659	4412	3 Q	Suartz (BRA); L 182–202	Did not advance	3rd place, bronze medalist(s)
Tommy Jones	Men's singles	235	234	186	279	220	228	1382	218	202	169	221	209	202	1221	2603	5 Q	186	223	226	183	225	167	235	246	1791	4394	5	Did not advance		
Devin Bidwell; Tommy Jones	Men's doubles	362	472	578	423	400	414	2649	456	398	378	439	474	409	2554	5203	3rd place, bronze medalist(s)	—N/a													
Liz Johnson	Women's singles	248	237	164	213	248	224	1334	258	203	249	224	238	203	1375	2709	1 Q	213	170	214	188	188	238	215	201	1687	4396	1 Q	Guerra (DOM); L 181–258	Did not advance	3rd place, bronze medalist(s)
Shannon Pluhowsky	Women's singles	215	187	207	176	207	223	1217	244	218	276	199	182	217	1336	2553	5 Q	224	206	225	207	207	176	219	245	2553	4342	2 Q	Restrepo (COL); W 214–212	Guerra (DOM); W 223–212	1st place, gold medalist(s)
Liz Johnson; Shannon Pluhowsky	Women's doubles	412	374	361	393	500	341	2381	432	435	374	365	502	436	2544	4925	2nd place, silver medalist(s)	—N/a													

== Boxing ==
The United States qualified boxers in every weight category except men's heavyweight and women's lightweight.

Men

Athlete	Event	Round of 16	Quarterfinals	Semifinals	Final	
Athlete	Event	Opposition Result	Opposition Result	Opposition Result	Opposition Result	Rank
Melik Elliston	Light flyweight	Vargas (GUA); L 0–3	Did not advance			
Antonio Vargas	Flyweight	de los Santos (DOM); W 2–1	Cintrón (PUR); W 2–1	Jimenez (CRC); W 2–1	Veitía (CUB); W 3–0	1st place, gold medalist(s)
Francisco Martinez	Bantamweight	Bye	Farronan (PER); W TKO-I	Garcia (DOM); L 0–3	Did not advance	3rd place, bronze medalist(s)
Carlos Balderas	Lightweight	Bye	Delgado (MEX); L 0–3	Did not advance		
Luis Feliciano	Light welterweight	Williams (BAH); W 2–1	Toledo (CUB); L 0–3	Did not advance		
Brian Ceballo	Welterweight	Cabrera (MEX); L 0–3	Did not advance			
Anthony Campbell	Middleweight	Bye	Rodriguez (MEX); L 0–3	Did not advance		
Steven Nelson	Light heavyweight	De Souza Borges (BRA); L 1–2	Did not advance			
Cam Awesome	Super heavyweight	—N/a	Kean (CAN); W 2–1	Pero (CUB); L 1–2	Did not advance	3rd place, bronze medalist(s)

Women

Athlete	Event	Quarterfinals	Semifinals	Final	
Athlete	Event	Opposition Result	Opposition Result	Opposition Result	Rank
Marlen Esparza	Flyweight	Parrales (NCA); W 3–0	Gonzalez (PUR); W 3–0	Bujold (CAN); L 1–2	2nd place, silver medalist(s)
Claressa Shields	Middleweight	Figueiredo (BRA); W 3–0	Perez (ARG); W 3–0	Guillén (DOM); W 3–0	1st place, gold medalist(s)

== Canoeing ==
Slalom

The United States has qualified the following boats:

Athlete(s)	Event	Preliminary			Semifinal		Final	
Athlete(s)	Event	Run 1	Run 2	Rank	Time	Rank	Time	Rank
Casey Eichfeld	Men's C-1	~~89.98~~	87.33	1 Q	92.84	1 Q	92.80	1st place, gold medalist(s)
Casey Eichfeld; Devin McEwan	Men's C-2	~~103.21~~	102.10	2 Q	120.05	1 Q	106.95	1st place, gold medalist(s)
Michal Smolen	Men's K-1	~~184.91~~	96.54	3 Q	89.49	3 Q	87.14	1st place, gold medalist(s)
Colleen Hickey	Women's C-1	~~180.43~~	131.95	2 Q	147.69	2 Q	131.43	2nd place, silver medalist(s)
Ashley Nee	Women's K-1	99.71	~~145.58~~	2 Q	98.59	1 Q	97.95	3rd place, bronze medalist(s)

Sprint

United States has qualified 7 athletes in the sprint discipline (3 in men's kayak and 4 in women's kayak). The country has also received one wildcard in women's canoe.

Men

Athlete	Event	Heats		Semifinals		Final	
Athlete	Event	Time	Rank	Time	Rank	Time	Rank
Tim Hornsby	K-1 200 m	37.740	4 QS	38.519	1 QF	36.356	6
Stanton Collins; Christopher Miller	K-2 1000 m	—N/a				3:35.599	7

Women

Athlete	Event	Heats		Semifinals		Final	
Athlete	Event	Time	Rank	Time	Rank	Time	Rank
Lydia Sampson	C-1 200 m	—N/a				58.178	7
Kaitlyn McElroy	K-1 200 m	45.439	4 QS	45.710	1 QF	46.827	6
Maggie Hogan	K-1 500 m	1:57.632	3 QF	Bye		2:06.013	4
Maggie Hogan; Kaitlyn McElroy	K-2 500 m	—N/a				1:52.536	4

Qualification Legend: QF = Qualify to final; QS = Qualify to semifinal

== Cycling ==
U.S. cyclists qualified for the following events

=== Road ===
Athlete	Event	Time	Rank
Eric Marcotte	Men's road race	3:46:26	2nd place, silver medalist(s)
Eric Marcotte	Men's time trial	48:07.27	7
Lauren Tamayo	Women's road race	2:08:00	30
Ruth Winder	Women's road race	2:07:52	7
Kelly Catlin	Women's time trial	26:25.58	1st place, gold medalist(s)

=== Track ===
Sprint

Athlete	Event	Qualification		Round of 16	Repechage 1	Quarterfinals	Semifinals	Final	
Athlete	Event	Time	Rank	Opposition Time	Opposition Time	Opposition Result	Opposition Result	Opposition Result	Rank
Matthew Baranoski	Men's	10.161	6 Q	Tjon En Fa (SUR); W 10.296	Bye	Canelón (VEN); L 0–2	Did not advance	Classification final W 10.442	5
David Espinoza	Men's	10.318	9 Q	Phillip (TTO); L	Barrette (CAN); L	Did not advance			
Matthew Baranoski; David Espinoza; Danny Robertson	Men's team	46.145	6	—N/a				Did not advance	

Pursuit

Athlete	Event	Qualification		Semifinals	Finals	
Athlete	Event	Time	Rank	Opposition Result	Opposition Result	Rank
Kelly Catlin; Sarah Hammer; Jennifer Valente; Ruth Winder	Women's team	4:25.051	2 Q	Mexico; W 4:36.183	Canada; L 4:26.426	2nd place, silver medalist(s)

Keirin

Athlete	Event	Heats	Final
Athlete	Event	Rank	Rank
Matthew Baranoski	Men's	4	7th–12th final 8

Omnium

Athlete	Event	Scratch race		Individual pursuit			Elimination race		Time trial			Flying lap			Points race		Total	
Athlete	Event	Rank	Points	Time	Rank	Points	Rank	Points	Time	Rank	Points	Time	Rank	Points	Points	Rank	Points	Rank
Sarah Hammer	Women's	4	34	3:31.951 PR	1	40	2	39	36.371	2	38	14.387	2	38	44	=1	223	1st place, gold medalist(s)

=== Mountain biking ===
Athlete	Event	Time	Rank
Stephen Ettinger	Men's cross-country	1:33:02	3rd place, bronze medalist(s)
Spencer Paxson	Men's cross-country	1:36:37	6
Kate Courtney	Women's cross-country	1:36:20	7
Erin Huck	Women's cross-country	1:32:36	3rd place, bronze medalist(s)

=== BMX ===
Athlete	Event	Qualifying		Seeding		Quarterfinal		Semifinal		Final	
Athlete	Event	Time	Rank	Time	Rank	Points	Rank	Time	Rank	Time	Rank
Connor Fields	Men's BMX	36.120	1 Q	1:00.193	14	3	1 Q	36.479	1 Q	DNF	
Nicholas Long	Men's BMX	38.050	11 Q	37.583	7	10	3 Q	37.661	4 Q	37.046	3rd place, bronze medalist(s)
Alise Post	Women's BMX	40.230	2 Q	1:11.443	6	—N/a		5	1 Q	1:22.541	6
Felicia Stancil	Women's BMX	41.130	4 Q	40.981	3	—N/a		6	2 Q	41.647	1st place, gold medalist(s)

== Diving ==
U.S. divers qualified for eight individual diving spots at the 2015 Pan American Games. These divers also made up the synchronized diving teams for each discipline.

Men

Athlete	Event	Semifinals		Final	
Athlete	Event	Points	Rank	Points	Rank
Cory Bowersox	3 m springboard	321.35	14	Did not advance	
Zachary Nees	3 m springboard	327.65	12 Q	367.70	11
Zachary Cooper	10 m platform	404.40	8 Q	355.35	9
Ryan Hawkins	10 m platform	380.90	9 Q	351.15	10
Cory Bowersox; Zachary Nees	3 m synchronized springboard	—N/a		385.38	3rd place, bronze medalist(s)
Zachary Cooper; Ryan Hawkins	10 m synchronized platform	—N/a		348.39	5

Women

Athlete	Event	Semifinals		Final	
Athlete	Event	Points	Rank	Points	Rank
Deidre Freeman	3 m springboard	285.30	6 Q	259.35	9
Maren Taylor	3 m springboard	316.40	2 Q	297.60	5
Samantha Bromberg	10 m platform	326.35	3 Q	337.95	5
Delaney Schnell	10 m platform	265.20	8 Q	263.40	8
Deidre Freeman; Maren Taylor	3 m synchronized springboard	—N/a		293.10	3rd place, bronze medalist(s)
Samantha Bromberg; Delaney Schnell	10 m synchronized platform	—N/a		287.82	4

== Equestrian ==
U.S. equestrians qualified teams in dressage, eventing and jumping competitions.

They have also qualified four athletes in the individual dressage competition.

=== Dressage ===
Athlete	Horse	Event	Grand Prix		Grand Prix Special		Grand Prix Freestyle	
Athlete	Horse	Event	Score	Rank	Score	Rank	Score	Rank
Laura Graves	Verdades	Individual	75.080	4 Q	77.177	1 Q	79.825	2nd place, silver medalist(s)
Kimberly Herslow	Rosmarin	Individual	75.184	3 Q	77.158	2 Q	73.175	8
Steffen Peters	Legolas 92	Individual	77.240	1 Q	72.667	7 Q	80.075	1st place, gold medalist(s)
Sabine Schut-Kery	Sanceo	Individual	71.790	7 Q	73.553	6	Did not advance	
Laura Graves; Kimberly Herslow; Steffen Peters; Sabine Schut-Kery	See above	Team	230.504	1 Q	230.002	1st place, gold medalist(s)	—N/a	

=== Eventing ===
Athlete	Horse	Event	Dressage		Cross-country			Jumping	Total	
Athlete	Horse	Event	Penalties	Rank	Penalties	Total	Rank	Penalties	Penalties	Rank
Phillip Dutton	Fernhill Fugitive	Individual	48.40	=8	0	48.40	=7 Q	4	52.40	10
Lauren Kieffer	Meadowbrook's Scarlett	Individual	48.40	=8	0	48.40	=7 Q	0	48.40	7
Marilyn Little	RF Scandalous	Individual	40.30	3	0	40.30	2 Q	0	40.30	1st place, gold medalist(s)
Boyd Martin	Pancho Villa	Individual	44.30	5	0	44.30	4 Q	0	44.30	4
Phillip Dutton; Lauren Kieffer; Marilyn Little; Boyd Martin	See above	Team	133.00	1	0	133.0	1	0	133.0	1st place, gold medalist(s)

=== Jumping ===
Athlete	Horse	Event	Qualification/Team Final					Final						Total	
Athlete	Horse	Event	Round 1	Round 2	Round 3			Round A		Round B			Jump-off	Total	
Athlete	Horse	Event	Penalties	Penalties	Penalties	Total	Rank	Penalties	Rank	Penalties	Total	Rank	Penalties	Penalties	Rank
Georgina Bloomberg	Lilli	Individual	0	4	0	4	=4 Q	4	=4 Q	8	12	=18	Did not advance	12	11
Kent Farrington	Gazelle	Individual	0	5	0	5	=9	Did not advance							
Lauren Hough	Ohlala	Individual	0	4	0	4	=4 Q	4	=4 Q	0	4	=2 Q	0	4	3rd place, bronze medalist(s)
McLain Ward	Rothchild	Individual	0	4	0	4	=4 Q	0	=1 Q	0	0	=1 Q	0	0	1st place, gold medalist(s)
Georgina Bloomberg; Kent Farrington; Lauren Hough; McLain Ward	See above	Team	0 Q	12	0	12	3	—N/a						12	3rd place, bronze medalist(s)

== Fencing ==
The United States has qualified 18 fencers (9 men, 9 women).

Men

Athlete	Event	Pool Round		Round of 16	Quarterfinals	Semifinals	Final / BM	
Athlete	Event	Result	Seed	Opposition Score	Opposition Score	Opposition Score	Opposition Score	Rank
Benjamin Bratton	Épée	3V – 2D	7	Coqueco (COL); W 15–12	Limardo (VEN); L 8–15	Did not advance		
Jason Pryor	Épée	4V – 1D	3	Ferreira (BRA); W 15–12	Taccani (ARG); W 15–7	Limardo (VEN); L 9–15	Did not advance	3rd place, bronze medalist(s)
Benjamin Bratton; Jason Pryor; Yeisser Ramirez	Épée Team	—N/a			Mexico; W 45–33	Colombia; W 45–42	Venezuela; L 40–45	2nd place, silver medalist(s)
Alexander Massialas	Foil	5V – 0D	1	Arizaga (MEX); W 15–8	Toldo (BRA); W 15–7	Gómez (MEX); W 15–2	Meinhardt (USA); W 15–12	1st place, gold medalist(s)
Gerek Meinhardt	Foil	5V – 0D	2	Lugo (PUR); W 15–8	Silva (CHI); W 15–6	Perrier (BRA); W 15–12	Massialas (USA); L 12–15	2nd place, silver medalist(s)
Miles Chamley-Watson; Alexander Massialas; Gerek Meinhardt	Foil Team	—N/a			Chile; W 45–16	Mexico; W 45–18	Brazil; W 45–26	1st place, gold medalist(s)
Eli Dershwitz	Sabre	3V – 2D	6	Quintero (VEN); W 15–6	Gordon (CAN); W 15–10	Bustamante (ARG); W 15–4	Polossifakis (CAN); W 15–9	1st place, gold medalist(s)
Daryl Homer	Sabre	4V – 1D	5	Zeytounlian (BRA); W 15–8	Agresta (BRA); L 12–15	Did not advance		
Eli Dershwitz; Daryl Homer; Jeff Spear	Sabre Team	—N/a			Chile; W 45–24	Argentina; W 45–25	Canada; W 45–31	1st place, gold medalist(s)

Women

Athlete	Event	Pool Round		Round of 16	Quarterfinals	Semifinals	Final / BM	
Athlete	Event	Result	Seed	Opposition Score	Opposition Score	Opposition Score	Opposition Score	Rank
Katharine Holmes	Épée	3V – 2D	7	MacKinnon (CAN); W 14–12	Di Tella (ARG); W 15–6	Moellhausen (BRA); W 10–7	Ramírez (DOM); W 15–14	1st place, gold medalist(s)
Katarzyna Trzopek	Épée	4V – 1D	4	Doig (PER); W 15–2	Martinez (VEN); L 14–15	Did not advance		
Katharine Holmes; Katarzyna Trzopke; Anna Van Brummen	Épée Team	—N/a			Dominican Republic; W 45–33	Brazil; W 32–31	Venezuela; W 29–22	1st place, gold medalist(s)
Lee Kiefer	Foil	5V – 0D	1	Rivero (VEN); W 15–5	Cecchini (BRA); W 15–9	Ross (USA); W 15–5	Van Erven (COL); W 15–11	1st place, gold medalist(s)
Nicole Ross	Foil	4V – 1D	5	Hernandez (MEX); W 13–10	Ryan (CAN); W 11–10	Kiefer (USA); L 5–15	Did not advance	3rd place, bronze medalist(s)
Lee Kiefer; Nzingha Prescod; Nicole Ross	Foil Team	—N/a			Cuba; W 45–19	Brazil; W 45–26	Canada; L 37–38	2nd place, silver medalist(s)
Dagmara Wozniak	Sabre	4V – 1D	5	Ysabel (DOM); W 15–8	Zagunis (USA); W 15–12	Page (CAN); W 15–13	Benítez (VEN); W 15–13	1st place, gold medalist(s)
Mariel Zagunis	Sabre	4V – 1D	4	Tobar (ESA); W 15–2	Wozniak (USA); L 12–15	Did not advance		
Ibtihaj Muhammad; Dagmara Wozniak; Mariel Zagunis	Sabre Team	—N/a			El Salvador; W 45–25	Cuba; W 45–33	Mexico; W 45–31	1st place, gold medalist(s)

== Field hockey ==
The United States has qualified both a men's and women's teams, for a total of 32 athletes (16 men and 16 women).

Men's tournament

Head Coach: Chris Clements

3. Michael Barminski
4. Tyler Sundeen
5. Patrick Harris (c)
6. Alex Grassi
9. Adam Miller
11. William Holt (c)
12. Ajai Dhadwal
14. Tom Barratt
17. Christian Linney
19. Moritz Runzi
21. Ranjot Sangha
22. Johnny Orozco
25. Alexander Cunningham
26. Mohan Gandhi
29. Aki Kaeppeler
30. Christopher Rea (GK)

Pool A

Pos	Team	Pld	W	D	L	GF	GA	GD	Pts	Qualification
1	Argentina	3	3	0	0	22	4	+18	9	Quarter-finals
2	United States	3	1	1	1	5	10	−5	4	Quarter-finals
3	Cuba	3	0	2	1	9	10	−1	2	Quarter-finals
4	Trinidad and Tobago	3	0	1	2	3	15	−12	1	Quarter-finals

Source: FIH
Rules for classification: 1) points; 2) matches won; 3) goal difference; 4) goals for; 5) head-to-head result.

14 July 2015
11:00

United States	3–3	Cuba
Runzi 9'; Käppeler 24'; Holt 28'	Report	Tritzant 32'; Blanco 51', 59'

Umpires:
Matias Barbosa (CHI)
David Sweetman (GBR)

16 July 2015
11:00

United States	0–6	Argentina
	Report	Mazzili 15'; Brunet 19'; Peillat 38', 47'; Callioni 41'; Della Torre 54'

Umpires:
Francisco Vázquez (ESP)
Gavin Caldecott (CAN)

18 July 2015
11:00

Trinidad and Tobago	1–2	United States
Campbell 14'	Report	Holt 6'; Grassi 13'

Umpires:
Francisco Vázquez (ESP)
You Suolong (CHN)

Quarterfinal

21 July 2015
17:00

United States	1–1	Brazil
Sundeen 57'	Report; Penalties	Borges 34'
Penalties
Harris (penalty shoot-out missed); Runzi (penalty shoot-out missed); Linney (penalty shoot-out scored); Cunningham (penalty shoot-out missed)	1–3	(penalty shoot-out scored) Paixão; (penalty shoot-out scored) Y. van der Heijden; (penalty shoot-out scored) Sousa; (penalty shoot-out missed) P. van der Heijden

Umpires:
Federico Garcia (URU)
Gavin Caldecott (CAN)

5th-8th classification

23 July 2015
11:00

United States	2–1	Trinidad and Tobago
Holt 27'; Sundeen 38'	Report	Marcano 36'

Umpires:
Gavin Caldecott (CAN)
Matias Barbosa (CHI)

5th place game

25 July 2015
11:00

Mexico	2–6	United States
Garcia Lopez 19'; Borquez Silva 30'	Report	Holt 3', 11', 17'; Barminski 22'; Harris 45'; Sundeen 51'

Umpires:
Gavin Caldecott (CAN)
Donny Gobinsingh (TTO)

Women's tournament

The United States field hockey women's team that will compete at the 2015 Pan American Games:

- Jaclyn Briggs
- Lauren Crandall
- Rachel Dawson
- Katelyn Falgowski
- Stefanie Fee
- Melissa González
- Michelle Kasold
- Kelsey Kolojejchick
- Alyssa Manley
- Kathleen O'Donnell
- Julia Reinprecht
- Katherine Reinprecht
- Paige Selenski
- Michelle Vittese
- Jill Witmer
- Emily Wold

Pool B

Pos	Team	Pld	W	D	L	GF	GA	GD	Pts	Qualification
1	United States	3	3	0	0	19	0	+19	9	Quarterfinals
2	Chile	3	2	0	1	10	4	+6	6	Quarterfinals
3	Uruguay	3	1	0	2	3	10	−7	3	Quarterfinals
4	Cuba	3	0	0	3	4	22	−18	0	Quarterfinals

Source: FIH
Rules for classification: 1) points; 2) goal difference; 3) goals scored; 4) head-to-head result.

13 July 2015
11:00

United States	5–0	Uruguay
K. Reinprecht 2'; Kasold 18'; Vittese 28'; Falgowski 36'; Kolojejchick 56'	Report

Umpires:
Soledad Iparraguirre (ARG)
Camila Cabargas (CHI)

15 July 2015
09:00

Chile	0–2	United States
	Report	Witmer 7'; Selenski 13'

Umpires:
Verónica Villafañe (ARG)
Michelle Joubert (RSA)

17 July 2015
09:00

United States	12–0	Cuba
O'Donnell 2', 25'; Selenski 15'; González 17', 50'; Dawson 21'; Witmer 27', 54'; Vittese 35'; K. Reinprecht 36'; Falgowski 47'; Kasold 48'	Report

Umpires:
Meghan McLennan (CAN)
Ayanna McClean (TTO)

Quarterfinal

20 July 2015
17:00

United States	15–0	Dominican Republic
Selenski 9'; Kasold 15'; Kolojejchick 18', 28', 32', 36'; Witmer 20', 55'; O'Donnell 26', 60'; K. Reinprecht 33'; Dawson 35'; Fee 40'; González 43'; Falgowski 46'	Report

Umpires:
Verónica Villafañe (ARG)
Megan Robertson (CAN)

Semifinal

22 July 2015
19:30

Canada	0–3	United States
	Report	Kolojejchick 9', 47'; Manley 58'

Umpires:
Soledad Iparraguirre (ARG)
Verónica Villafañe (ARG)

Gold medal game

24 July 2015
19:30

(silver) Argentina	1–2	United States (gold)
F. Habif 58'	Report	K. Reinprecht 34'; Vittese 40'

Umpires:
Aleesha Unka (NZL)
Ayanna McClean (TTO)

== Golf ==
The U.S. qualified a full team of two female and two male golfers.

Athlete	Event	Round 1	Round 2	Round 3	Round 4	Total	
Athlete	Event	Score	Score	Score	Score	Score	Rank
Beau Hossler	Men's individual	70	74	68	69	281	6
Lee McCoy	Men's individual	70	68	71	69	278	4
Kristen Gillman	Women's individual	75	75	71	70	297	6
Andrea Lee	Women's individual	69	68	70	74	281	2nd place, silver medalist(s)
Kristen Gillman; Beau Hossler; Andrea Lee; Lee McCoy	Mixed team	139	136	138	139	552	2nd place, silver medalist(s)

== Gymnastics ==
=== Artistic ===
The United States qualified 10 athletes.

Men
Team & Individual Qualification

Athlete	Event	Final							
Athlete	Event	Apparatus						Total	Rank
Athlete	Event	F	PH	R	V	PB	HB	Total	Rank
Marvin Kimble	Team	—N/a	15.050 Q	13.050	—N/a	14.500	14.450	57.050	41
Steven Legendre	Team	13.750	13.200	14.550	14.550	—N/a	—N/a	56.050	43
Samuel Mikulak	Team	15.000 Q	14.850 Q	14.750	14.600	15.550 Q	15.100 Q	89.850	2 Q
Paul Ruggeri	Team	14.750	—N/a	—N/a	14.900 Q	13.750	15.400 Q	58.800	39
Donnell Whittenburg	Team	14.900 Q	14.150	15.450 Q	14.900 Q	14.900 Q	13.400	87.700	4 Q
Total	Team	41.800	43.050	45.050	45.350	44.550	44.250	264.050	1st place, gold medalist(s)

Individual finals

Athlete	Event	Apparatus						Total	Rank
Athlete	Event	F	PH	R	V	PB	HB	Total	Rank
Marvin Kimble	Pommel horse	—N/a	15.025	—N/a				15.025	1st place, gold medalist(s)
Samuel Mikulak	All-around	14.850	14.250	15.000	14.950	15.800	14.800	89.650	1st place, gold medalist(s)
Samuel Mikulak	Floor	14.925	—N/a					14.925	3rd place, bronze medalist(s)
Samuel Mikulak	Pommel horse	—N/a	14.575	—N/a				14.575	5
Samuel Mikulak	Parallel bars	—N/a				15.450	—N/a	15.450	3rd place, bronze medalist(s)
Samuel Mikulak	Horizontal bar	—N/a					14.575	14.575	6
Paul Ruggeri	Vault	—N/a			14.712	—N/a		14.712	5
Paul Ruggeri	Horizontal bar	—N/a					15.450	15.450	3rd place, bronze medalist(s)
Donnell Whittenburg	All-around	14.700	13.350	15.650	15.000	15.500	12.500	86.750	6
Donnell Whittenburg	Floor	14.975	—N/a					14.975	2nd place, silver medalist(s)
Donnell Whittenburg	Rings	—N/a		15.525	—N/a			15.525	2nd place, silver medalist(s)
Donnell Whittenburg	Vault	—N/a			14.962	—N/a		14.962	2nd place, silver medalist(s)
Donnell Whittenburg	Parallel bars	—N/a				15.350	—N/a	15.350	5

Women
Team & Individual Qualification

Athlete	Event	Final					
Athlete	Event	Apparatus				Total	Rank
Athlete	Event	V	UB	BB	F	Total	Rank
Madison Desch	Team	14.950	14.450	13.250	14.650 Q	57.300	2 Q
Rachel Gowey	Team	—N/a	14.750 Q	14.500 Q	—N/a	29.250	42
Amelia Hundley	Team	15.100	14.500 Q	13.750	14.300 Q	57.650	1 Q
Emily Schild	Team	15.050	—N/a		13.750	28.800	43
Megan Skaggs	Team	14.900	13.750	14.050 Q	13.400	56.100	5
Total	Team	45.100	43.700	42.300	42.700	173.800	1st place, gold medalist(s)

Individual finals

Athlete	Event	Apparatus				Total	Rank
Athlete	Event	V	UB	BB	F	Total	Rank
Madison Desch	All-around	14.850	14.500	13.950	14.150	57.450	2nd place, silver medalist(s)
Madison Desch	Floor	—N/a			13.975	13.975	4
Rachel Gowey	Uneven bars	—N/a	14.725	—N/a		14.725	1st place, gold medalist(s)
Rachel Gowey	Balance beam	—N/a		11.625	—N/a	11.625	8
Amelia Hundley	All-around	15.000	12.900	14.100	14.100	56.100	4
Amelia Hundley	Uneven bars	—N/a	14.650	—N/a		14.650	3rd place, bronze medalist(s)
Amelia Hundley	Floor	—N/a			14.200	14.200	2nd place, silver medalist(s)
Megan Skaggs	Balance beam	—N/a		14.050	—N/a	14.050	2nd place, silver medalist(s)

=== Rhythmic ===
The United States has qualified a full team of eight gymnasts (six in group and two in individual).

Individual

Athlete	Event	Final					
Athlete	Event	Hoop	Ball	Clubs	Ribbon	Total	Rank
Jasmine Kerber	Individual all-around	16.517 Q	16.233 Q	14.933 Q	14.517	62.200	2nd place, silver medalist(s)
Jasmine Kerber	Hoop	16.300	—N/a			16.300	2nd place, silver medalist(s)
Jasmine Kerber	Ball	—N/a	16.100	—N/a		16.100	2nd place, silver medalist(s)
Jasmine Kerber	Clubs	—N/a		15.833	—N/a	15.833	3rd place, bronze medalist(s)
Jasmine Kerber	Ribbon	—N/a			15.992	15.992	2nd place, silver medalist(s)
Laura Zeng	Individual all-around	15.183 Q	16.292 Q	16.433 Q	16.667 Q	64.575	1st place, gold medalist(s)
Laura Zeng	Hoop	16.833	—N/a			16.833	1st place, gold medalist(s)
Laura Zeng	Ball	—N/a	16.883	—N/a		16.883	1st place, gold medalist(s)
Laura Zeng	Clubs	—N/a		16.167	—N/a	16.167	1st place, gold medalist(s)
Laura Zeng	Ribbon	—N/a			16.267	16.267	1st place, gold medalist(s)

Qualification Legend: Q = Qualified to apparatus final

Group

Athletes	Event	Final			
Athletes	Event	5 Ribbons	6 Clubs & 2 Hoops	Total	Rank
Kiana Eide; Alisa Kano; Natalie McGiffert; Jennifer Rokhman; Monica Rokhman; Kristen Shaldybin	Group all-around	14.600 Q	14.675 Q	29.275	2nd place, silver medalist(s)
Kiana Eide; Alisa Kano; Natalie McGiffert; Jennifer Rokhman; Monica Rokhman; Kristen Shaldybin	5 Ribbons	13.283	—N/a	13.283	2nd place, silver medalist(s)
Kiana Eide; Alisa Kano; Natalie McGiffert; Jennifer Rokhman; Monica Rokhman; Kristen Shaldybin	6 clubs + 2 hoops	—N/a	14.983	14.983	1st place, gold medalist(s)

Qualification Legend: Q = Qualified to apparatus final

=== Trampoline ===
The United States has qualified 4 athletes.

Athlete	Event	Qualification		Final	
Athlete	Event	Score	Rank	Score	Rank
Logan Dooley	Men's	99.300	5 Q	53.080	7
Steven Gluckstein	Men's	103.170	2 Q	55.595	2nd place, silver medalist(s)
Charlotte Drury	Women's	33.205	8 Q	50.190	5
Clare Johnson	Women's	93.600	3 Q	51.230	4

== Judo ==
The United States has qualified a team of twelve judokas (six men and six women).

Men

Athlete	Event	Round of 16	Quarterfinals	Semifinals	Repechage	Final / BM	
Athlete	Event	Opposition Result	Opposition Result	Opposition Result	Opposition Result	Opposition Result	Rank
Bradford Bolen	−66 kg	Bye	Tondique (CUB); L 000–101	Did not advance	González (ARG); L 001–101	Did not advance	7
Travis Stevens	−81 kg	Bye	Miranda (PUR); W 101–000	Castro (COL); W 110–000	Bye	Silva (CUB); W 101–000	1st place, gold medalist(s)
Jacob Larsen	−90 kg	Bye	González (CUB); L 000–100	Did not advance	Martínez (VEN); W 010–000	Schmidt (ARG); W 010–010S1	3rd place, bronze medalist(s)
Ajax Tadehara	−100 kg	Bye	Deschnes (CAN); L 000–110	Did not advance	Bueno (URU); L 000–101	Did not advance	7
Akbarzhan Iminov	+100 kg	Bye	Figueroa (ECU); L 000–011	Did not advance	Cuevas (MEX); L 000S2–000S1	Did not advance	7

Women

Athlete	Event	Round of 16	Quarterfinals	Semifinals	Repechage	Final / BM	
Athlete	Event	Opposition Result	Opposition Result	Opposition Result	Opposition Result	Opposition Result	Rank
Angelica Delgado	−52 kg	Bye	Cruz (MEX); W 011–000	Guica (CAN); L 000–100	Bye	García (DOM); W 000–000S2	3rd place, bronze medalist(s)
Marti Malloy	−57 kg	Bye	Anriqueles (VEN); W 100–000	Plaza (ECU); W 010–000	Bye	Beauchemin-Pinard (CAN); W 001–000	1st place, gold medalist(s)
Hannah Martin	−63 kg	Bye	Arteaga (VEN); W 100–000	García (ECU); L 000S2–000	Bye	Del Toro (CUB); L 000S2–000	5
Kathleen Sell	−70 kg	Ortiz (GUA); W 100–000	Cortés (CUB); L 000–002	Did not advance	Poo (MEX); L 000S3–000S2	Did not advance	7
Kayla Harrison	−78 kg	Bye	Nolberto (GUA); W 101–000	Roberge (CAN); W 000–000S3	Bye	Aguiar (BRA); W 100–000	1st place, gold medalist(s)
Nina Cutro-Kelly	+78 kg	—N/a	German (DOM); W 101–000	Ortiz (CUB); L 000–101	Bye	Da Cunha (ARG); W 100–000	3rd place, bronze medalist(s)

== Karate ==
The United States has qualified 7 athletes.

Men

Athlete	Event	Round robin				Semifinals	Final	
Athlete	Event	Opposition Result	Opposition Result	Opposition Result	Rank	Opposition Result	Opposition Result	Rank
Brandis Miyazaki	–60 kg	Chung (CAN); W 2–0	Martinez (VEN); L 2–6	Sosa (DOM); W 8–0	2 Q	Brose (BRA); L 0–3	Did not advance	3rd place, bronze medalist(s)
Thomas Scott	–75 kg	Icasati (ARG); W 4–2	Dubo (CHI); L 0–2	Espinoza (ECU); W 1–0	1 Q	Boily-Martineau (CAN); W 5–0	Nicastro (VEN); W 4–3	1st place, gold medalist(s)
Brian Irr	+84 kg	Tiril (CUB); D 33	Recouso (ARG); W 8–0	Aponte (VEN); W 2–1	2 Q	Castillo (DOM); L 5–5	Did not advance	3rd place, bronze medalist(s)

Women

Athlete	Event	Round robin				Semifinals	Final	
Athlete	Event	Opposition Result	Opposition Result	Opposition Result	Rank	Opposition Result	Opposition Result	Rank
Tyler Wolfe	–50 kg	Bruna (CHI); L 0–1	Cuellar (MEX); D 0–0	Souza (BRA); L 0–2	4	Did not advance		
Brandi Robinson	–55 kg	Vindrola (PER); L 0–1	Urango (COL); W 8–0	Reyes (CHI); W 2–1	3	Did not advance		
Joane Orbon	–61 kg	Arreola (MEX); L 0–1	Lepin (CHI); W 5–3	Brito (VEN); L 0–1	4	Did not advance		
Eimi Kurita	–68 kg	Brozulatto (BRA); L 0–1	Lazo (ECU); L 2–3	Harrigan (DOM); L 1–5	4	Did not advance		

== Modern pentathlon ==
United States has qualified a team of 4 athletes (2 men and 2 women).

Athlete	Event	Fencing (Épée One Touch)			Swimming (200m Freestyle)			Riding (Show Jumping)			Shooting/Running (10 m Air Pistol/3000m)			Total Points	Final Rank
Athlete	Event	Results	Rank	MP Points	Time	Rank	MP Points	Penalties	Rank	MP Points	Time	Rank	MP Points	Total Points	Final Rank
Dennis Bowsher	Men's	13–15	17	195	2:06.10	7	322	21	8	279	12:28.49	10	552	1348	10
Nathan Schrimsher	Men's	19–9	4	243	2:00.59	1	339	14	4	286	12:27.28	9	553	1421	3rd place, bronze medalist(s)
Samantha Achterberg	Women's	6–15	20	169	1:18.53	8	285	7	5	293	13:47.32	11	473	1220	11
Margaux Isaksen	Women's	10–11	13	206	2:15.54	2	294	33	16	267	13:38.17	7	482	1249	8

== Racquetball ==
The United States has qualified a team of four men and two women for a total of six athletes. The US Team named seven athletes – four men and three women – to the team. The team was allowed an extra woman athlete, as teams that qualified ahead of the USA are not using all their qualifying spots.

Men

Athlete	Event	Pool play				Round of 32	Round of 16	Quarterfinals	Semifinals	Final	
Athlete	Event	Opposition Result	Opposition Result	Opposition Result	Rank	Opposition Result	Opposition Result	Opposition Result	Opposition Result	Opposition Result	Rank
Jake Bredenbeck	Singles	Cubillos (COL); W 15–9, 13–15, 11–2	Castillo (VEN); W 15–7, 13–15, 11–0	Pérez (DOM); W 15–7, 15–2	1	Bye	Iwaasa (CAN); L 4–15, 9–15	Did not advance			
Rocky Carson	Singles	Camacho (CRC); W 15–4, 15–4	Castro (VEN); W 15–2, 15–0	Alvarez (ECU); W 15–11, 15–2	1	Bye	de Leon (DOM); W 15–2, 15–4	Pérez (DOM); W 15–8, 15–1	de la Rosa (MEX); W 15–4, 15–8	Beltrán (MEX); W 15–11, 15–10	1st place, gold medalist(s)
Jansen Allen; Jose Rojas	Doubles	Camacho; Fumero (CRC); W 13–15, 15–12, 11–3	Gagnon; Landeryou (CAN); L 14–15, 8–15	Alvarez; Rios (ECU); W WO	2	—N/a	Bye	Castillo; Castro (VEN); W 15–5, 15–8	Beltrán; Moreno (MEX); W 15–13, 15–4	Keller; Moscoso (BOL); W 15–8, 15–5	1st place, gold medalist(s)
Jansen Allen; Jake Bredenbeck; Rocky Carson; Jose Rojas	Team	—N/a					Bye	Venezuela; W 2–0, 2–0	Canada; W 2–0, 0–2, 2–0	Mexico; L 0–2, 0–2	2nd place, silver medalist(s)

Women

Athlete	Event	Pool play				Round of 32	Round of 16	Quarterfinals	Semifinals	Final	
Athlete	Event	Opposition Result	Opposition Result	Opposition Result	Rank	Opposition Result	Opposition Result	Opposition Result	Opposition Result	Opposition Result	Rank
Michelle Key	Singles	Salas (MEX); L 3–15, 14–15	Riveros (BOL); L 15–13, 11–15, 8–11	Martinez (GUA); W 15–14, 15–2	3	Bye	Rajsich (USA); L 8–15, 7–15	Did not advance			
Rhonda Rajsich	Singles	Guillemette (ARG); W 15–7, 15–9	Loma (BOL); W 15–7, 15–7	Muñoz (CHI); W' 15–6, 15–9	1	Bye	Key (USA); W 15–8, 15–7	Lambert (CAN); W 15–9, 9–15, 11–7	Longoria (MEX); L 13–15, 9–15	Did not advance	3rd place, bronze medalist(s)
Rhonda Rajsich; Kim Russell	Doubles	Guillemette; Vargas (ARG); W 12–15, 15–6, 11–7	Rodriguez; Martinez (GUA); W 15–9, 15–4	—N/a	1	—N/a	Bye	Grisar; Muñoz (CHI); W 6–15, 15–10, 11–8	Guillemette; Vargas (ARG); L 7–15, 15–13, 6–11	Did not advance	3rd place, bronze medalist(s)
Michelle Key; Rhonda Rajsich; Kim Russell	Team	—N/a					Bye	Colombia; W 2–0, 2–0	Canada; W 2–0, 2–0	Mexico; L 0–2, 0–2	2nd place, silver medalist(s)

== Roller sports ==
The U.S. qualified three male and three female roller skaters.

Track skating

Athlete	Event	Semifinal		Final	
Athlete	Event	Time	Rank	Result	Rank
Paul Jarrett	Men's 200 m time-trial	—N/a		17.257	7
Paul Jarrett	Men's 500 m	40.134	3	Did not advance	9
Mario Valencia	Men's 10000 m points race	—N/a		0	10
Erin Jackson	Women's 200 m time-trial	—N/a		18.479	5
Erin Jackson	Women's 500 m	43.597	2 Q	43.714	2nd place, silver medalist(s)
Darian O'Neil	Women's 10000 m points race	—N/a		6	3rd place, bronze medalist(s)

Figure skating

Athlete	Event	Short program		Long program		Total	Rank
Athlete	Event	Score	Rank	Score	Rank	Total	Rank
John Burchfield	Men's free skating	127.00	3 Q	126.00	2	505.00	2nd place, silver medalist(s)
Courtney Donovan	Women's free skating	107.50	5 Q	113.40	6	447.70	6

== Rowing ==
The United States has qualified 14 boats.

Men

Athlete	Event	Heats		Repechage		Final	
Athlete	Event	Time	Rank	Time	Rank	Time	Rank
Yohann Rigogne	Single sculls	7:06.78	1 FA	Bye		8:02.40	4
Ryan Monaghan; Sam Stitt	Double sculls	6:28.72	1 FA	Bye		6:39.77	4
Colin Ethridge; Austin Meyer	Lightweight double sculls	6:31.53	1 FA	Bye		6:17.34	2nd place, silver medalist(s)
Colin Ethridge; Austin Meyer; Ryan Monaghan; Sam Stitt	Quadruple sculls	6:11.44	3 FA	—N/a		6:05.02	5
Brendan Harrington; Matthew Mahon	Pair	6:40.66	3 R	7:11.41	3 FA	6:39.77	6
David Eick; Nareg Guregian; Keane Johnson; Kyle Peabody	Four	6:30.48	3 FA	—N/a		6:21.13	4
Peter Gibson; Matthew O'Donoghue; Robin Prendes; Andrew Weiland	Lightweight four	6:00.25	1 FA	Bye		6:46.56	2nd place, silver medalist(s)
Taylor Brown; David Eick; Nareg Guregian; Brendan Harrington; Keane Johnson; Matthew Mahon; Sam Ojserkis; Kyle Peabody; Erick Winstead	Eight	6:03.81	2 FA	—N/a		6:12.64	3rd place, bronze medalist(s)

Women

Athlete	Event	Heats		Repechage		Final	
Athlete	Event	Time	Rank	Time	Rank	Time	Rank
Katherine McFetridge	Single sculls	7:56.38	1 FA	Bye		7:38.21	2nd place, silver medalist(s)
Mary Jones	Lightweight single sculls	7:43.34	1 FA	Bye		8:49.19	1st place, gold medalist(s)
Lindsay Meyer; Nichole Ritchie	Double sculls	7:07.61	2 FA	—N/a		7:14.65	2nd place, silver medalist(s)
Victoria Burke; Sarah Giancola	Lightweight double sculls	7:28.79	2 R	7:39.88	2 FA	7:03.86	3rd place, bronze medalist(s)
Victoria Burke; Sarah Giancola; Lindsay Meyer; Nicole Ritchie	Quadruple sculls	6:45.06	2 FA	—N/a		7:16.26	2nd place, silver medalist(s)
Molly Bruggeman; Emily Huelskamp	Pair	7:19.44	1 FA	—N/a		7:20.98	1st place, gold medalist(s)

Qualification Legend: FA=Final A (medal); FB=Final B (non-medal); R=Repechage

== Rugby sevens ==
The United States has qualified a men's and women's teams for a total of 24 athletes (12 men and 12 women).

=== Men's tournament ===
Group A

Team	Pld	W	D	L	PF	PA	PD	Pts	Qualification
United States	3	3	0	0	126	7	+119	9	Qualified for the quarterfinals
Uruguay	3	2	0	1	54	69	−15	7	Qualified for the quarterfinals
Chile	3	1	0	2	62	46	+16	5	Qualified for the quarterfinals
Mexico	3	0	0	3	0	120	−120	3	Qualified for the quarterfinals

11 July 2015
11:11

United States	26–7	Chile
	Report

Exhibition Stadium, Toronto

11 July 2015
16:05

United States	46–0	Mexico
	Report

Exhibition Stadium, Toronto

11 July 2015
19:11

United States	52–0	Uruguay
	Report

Exhibition Stadium, Toronto

Quarter-final

12 July 2015
11:10

United States	31–0	Guyana
	Report

Exhibition Stadium, Toronto

Semi-final

12 July 2015
16:49

United States	19–26	Canada
	Report

Exhibition Stadium, Toronto

Bronze medal game

12 July 2015
19:34

(bronze) United States	40–12	Uruguay
	Report

Exhibition Stadium, Toronto

=== Women's tournament ===
Team	Pld	W	D	L	PF	PA	PD	Pts	Qualification
Canada	5	5	0	0	230	12	+218	15	Qualified for gold-medal match
United States	5	4	0	1	203	48	+155	13	Qualified for gold-medal match
Brazil	5	3	0	2	115	67	+48	11	Qualified for bronze-medal match
Argentina	5	1	1	3	57	131	−74	8	Qualified for bronze-medal match
Colombia	5	1	1	3	29	148	−119	8	
Mexico	5	0	0	5	24	252	−228	5	

11 July 2015
10:27

United States	26–7	Brazil
	Report

Exhibition Stadium, Toronto

11 July 2015
12:49

United States	40–0	Colombia
	Report

Exhibition Stadium, Toronto

11 July 2015
17:33

Argentina	7–54	United States
	Report

Exhibition Stadium, Toronto

12 July 2015
10:49

Mexico	0–71	United States
	Report

Exhibition Stadium, Toronto

12 July 2015
13:33

Canada	34–12	United States
	Report

Exhibition Stadium, Toronto

Gold medal game

12 July 2015
18:20

(silver) United States	7–55	Canada (gold)
	Report

Exhibition Stadium, Toronto

== Sailing ==
The United States qualified 9 boats.

Men

Athlete	Event	Race																	Net Points	Final Rank
Athlete	Event	1	2	3	4	5	6	7	8	9	10	11	12	13	14	15	16	M*	Net Points	Final Rank
Carson Crain	RS:X	5	5	4	5	5	~~7~~	7	6	7	7	7	6	6	Cancelled			Did not advance	70	6
Charlie Buckingham	Laser	1	~~17~~; ~~BFD~~	2	1	6	14	4	1	2	2	6	4	—N/a				14	57	4

Women

Athlete	Event	Race																	Net Points	Final Rank
Athlete	Event	1	2	3	4	5	6	7	8	9	10	11	12	13	14	15	16	M*	Net Points	Final Rank
Marion Lepert	RS:X	4	3	4	4	4	~~6~~	3	3	4	4	3	3	5	Cancelled			6	50	3rd place, bronze medalist(s)
Paige Railey	Laser Radial	3	3	6	1	4	2	~~8~~	2	6	4	4	7	—N/a				8	50	1st place, gold medalist(s)
Paris Henken; Helena Scutt	49erFX	2	3	3	3	3	4	2	~~5~~	5	3	1	2	2	5	2	1	6	47	3rd place, bronze medalist(s)

Open

Athlete	Event	Race													Net Points	Final Rank
Athlete	Event	1	2	3	4	5	6	7	8	9	10	11	12	M*	Net Points	Final Rank
Conner Blouin	Sunfish	8	2	2	6	8	8	~~13~~; ~~OCS~~	5	4	7	4	1	14; OCS	69	6
Augie Diaz; Kathleen Tocke	Snipe	~~7~~	5	1	1	6	3	3	2	7	2	2	4	10	46	3rd place, bronze medalist(s)
Justin Coplan; Caroline Patten; Danielle Prior	Lightning	1	1	6	~~7~~	4	3	1	2	2	2	3	6	6	37	2nd place, silver medalist(s)
Grace Modderman; Mark Modderman	Hobie 16	1	~~6~~	1	4	4	3	3	5	4	4	2	2	6	39	2nd place, silver medalist(s)

== Shooting ==
The United States has qualified a full quota of 25 shooters.

Men

Athlete	Event	Qualification		Final	
Athlete	Event	Points	Rank	Points	Rank
Nickolaus Mowrer	10 m air pistol	568	9	Did not advance	
Jay Shi	10 m air pistol	571	5 Q	199.0	2nd place, silver medalist(s)
Brad Balsley	25 m rapid fire pistol	565	6 Q	32	1st place, gold medalist(s)
Emil Milev	25 m rapid fire pistol	582	1 Q	17	5
Nickolaus Mowrer	50 m pistol	538	7 Q	129.9	5
Jason Turner	50 m pistol	528	17	Did not advance	
Connor Davis	10 m air rifle	616.2	3 Q	202.5	1st place, gold medalist(s)
Bryant Wallizer	10 m air rifle	624.9 PR	1 Q	180.8	3rd place, bronze medalist(s)
Michael McPhail	50 m rifle prone	625.0	2 Q	205.5	2nd place, silver medalist(s)
George Norton	50 m rifle prone	617.3	9	Did not advance	
Ryan Anderson	50 m rifle 3 position	1167	2 Q	437.3	3rd place, bronze medalist(s)
George Norton	50 m rifle 3 position	1154	5 Q	447.9	2nd place, silver medalist(s)

Match shooting

Athlete	Event	Qualification		Semifinal		Final / BM	
Athlete	Event	Points	Rank	Points	Rank	Opposition Result	Rank
Myles Walker	Trap	111	9	Did not advance			
Casey Wallace	Trap	111	8	Did not advance			
Glenn Eller	Double trap	133	1 Q	26	=3 QB	Brol (GUA); L 26–29	4
Thomas Bayer	Skeet	120	3 Q	15	=1 QG	Perry (USA); W 16–14	1st place, gold medalist(s)
Dustin Perry	Skeet	119	=5 Q	15	=1 QG	Bayer (USA); L 14–16	2nd place, silver medalist(s)

Qualification key: Q=Qualified for semifinal; QB=Qualified for bronze medal match; QG=Qualified for gold medal match

Women

Athlete	Event	Qualification		Final	
Athlete	Event	Points	Rank	Points	Rank
Courtney Anthony	10 m air pistol	386 PR	1 Q	93.9	7
Sandra Uptagrafft	10 m air pistol	374	5 Q	74.0	8
Elizabeth Marsh	10 m air rifle	411.7	3 Q	79.8	8
Sarah Osborn	10 m air rifle	406.3	12	Did not advance	
Hannah Black	50 m rifle 3 position	571	7 Q	415.7	5
Amanda Furrer	50 m rifle 3 position	572	4 Q	404.2	6

Match shooting

Athlete	Event	Qualification		Semifinal		Final / BM	
Athlete	Event	Points	Rank	Points	Rank	Opposition Result	Rank
Brenda Silva	25 m pistol	573	2 Q	9	6	Did not advance	
Sandra Uptagrafft	25 m pistol	571	5 Q	12	2 QG	Kiejko (CAN); L 3–7	2nd place, silver medalist(s)
Kimberley Bowers	Trap	62	2 Q	11	=3 QB	Latorre (PUR); W 11(1,1)–11(1,0)	3rd place, bronze medalist(s)
Kayle Browning	Trap	63	1 Q	13	=1 QG	Chudoba (CAN); L 11(1,0)–11(1,1)	2nd place, silver medalist(s)
Kimberly Rhode	Skeet	74 PR	1 Q	16	1 QG	Gil (ARG); W 15–12	1st place, gold medalist(s)

Qualification key: Q=Qualified for semifinal; QB=Qualified for bronze medal match; QG=Qualified for gold medal match

== Softball ==
The United States has qualified both a men's and women's teams. Each team will consist of 15 athletes for a total of 30.

=== Men's tournament ===
The United States men's team roster.

- Kris Bogach
- Freddy Carmona
- Kevin Castillo
- Nate Devine
- Josh Johnson
- Tony Mancha
- Chris Miljavac
- Gerald Muizelaar
- Nick Mullins
- Matt Palazzo
- Bobby Rosthenhausler
- Pat Sagdal
- Rylan Sandoval
- Chase Turner
- Derrick Zechman

Group A

Team	Pld	W	L	RF	RA	RD	Qualification
Canada	5	5	0	33	13	+20	Qualified for the semifinals
Argentina	5	3	2	19	15	+4	Qualified for the semifinals
Venezuela	5	3	2	14	10	+4	Qualified for the semifinals
United States	5	2	3	16	10	+6	Qualified for the semifinals
Mexico	5	2	3	16	22	−6	
Dominican Republic	5	0	5	5	33	−28	

12 July 2015; 10:00	Dominican Republic	0–10	United States	President’s Choice Ajax Pan Am Ballpark, Ajax; Attendance: 1,010
12 July 2015; 10:00		Boxscore		President’s Choice Ajax Pan Am Ballpark, Ajax; Attendance: 1,010

13 July 2015; 19:00	United States	2–3	Canada	President’s Choice Ajax Pan Am Ballpark, Ajax; Attendance: 2,230
13 July 2015; 19:00		Boxscore		President’s Choice Ajax Pan Am Ballpark, Ajax; Attendance: 2,230

14 July 2015; 14:00	United States	1–3	Venezuela	President’s Choice Ajax Pan Am Ballpark, Ajax; Attendance: 132
14 July 2015; 14:00		Boxscore		President’s Choice Ajax Pan Am Ballpark, Ajax; Attendance: 132

15 July 2015; 16:30	Argentina	3–1	United States	President’s Choice Ajax Pan Am Ballpark, Ajax; Attendance: 301
15 July 2015; 16:30		Boxscore		President’s Choice Ajax Pan Am Ballpark, Ajax; Attendance: 301

16 July 2015; 19:00	Mexico	1–2	United States	President’s Choice Ajax Pan Am Ballpark, Ajax; Attendance: 89
16 July 2015; 19:00		Boxscore		President’s Choice Ajax Pan Am Ballpark, Ajax; Attendance: 89

Semifinal

17 July 2015; 16:30	Venezuela	1–0	United States	President’s Choice Ajax Pan Am Ballpark, Ajax; Attendance: 521
17 July 2015; 16:30		Boxscore		President’s Choice Ajax Pan Am Ballpark, Ajax; Attendance: 521

=== Women's tournament ===
The United States announced their squad on January 8, 2015.

- Valerie Arioto
- Ally Carda
- Raven Chavanne
- Amanda Chidester
- Kellie Fox
- Lauren Gibson
- Janelle Lindvall
- Haylie McCleney
- Jessica Moore
- Michelle Moultrie
- Sara Nevins
- Sierra Romero
- Kelsey Stewart
- Janie Takeda
- Jaclyn Traina

Group A

Team	Pld	W	L	RF	RA	RD	Qualification
United States	5	5	0	43	4	+39	Qualified for the semifinals
Canada	5	4	1	21	14	+7	Qualified for the semifinals
Puerto Rico	5	3	2	18	17	+1	Qualified for the semifinals
Brazil	5	2	3	7	19	−12	Qualified for the semifinals
Cuba	5	1	4	10	23	−13	
Dominican Republic	5	0	5	14	36	−22	

19 July 2015; 19:00	Puerto Rico	2 – 9	United States	President’s Choice Ajax Pan Am Ballpark, Ajax; Attendance: 234
19 July 2015; 19:00		Boxscore		President’s Choice Ajax Pan Am Ballpark, Ajax; Attendance: 234

20 July 2015; 14:00	Brazil	0 – 7	United States	President’s Choice Ajax Pan Am Ballpark, Ajax; Attendance: 502
20 July 2015; 14:00		Boxscore		President’s Choice Ajax Pan Am Ballpark, Ajax; Attendance: 502

21 July 2015; 19:00	Canada	0 – 7	United States	President’s Choice Ajax Pan Am Ballpark, Ajax; Attendance: 2,900
21 July 2015; 19:00		Boxscore		President’s Choice Ajax Pan Am Ballpark, Ajax; Attendance: 2,900

22 July 2015; 16:30	Cuba	2 – 9	United States	President’s Choice Ajax Pan Am Ballpark, Ajax; Attendance: 450
22 July 2015; 16:30		Boxscore		President’s Choice Ajax Pan Am Ballpark, Ajax; Attendance: 450

23 July 2015; 14:00	Dominican Republic	0 – 11	United States	President’s Choice Ajax Pan Am Ballpark, Ajax; Attendance: 112
23 July 2015; 14:00		Boxscore		President’s Choice Ajax Pan Am Ballpark, Ajax; Attendance: 112

Semifinal

24 July 2015; 19:00	United States	5 – 2	Canada	President’s Choice Ajax Pan Am Ballpark, Ajax; Attendance: 2,145
24 July 2015; 19:00		Boxscore		President’s Choice Ajax Pan Am Ballpark, Ajax; Attendance: 2,145

Gold medal game

26 July 2015; 11:00	(silver) United States	2 – 4 (8)	Canada (gold)	President’s Choice Ajax Pan Am Ballpark, Ajax; Attendance: 3,000
26 July 2015; 11:00		Boxscore		President’s Choice Ajax Pan Am Ballpark, Ajax; Attendance: 3,000

== Squash ==
The United States has qualified the maximum team of three men and three women, for a total of six athletes. The team was named on March 26, 2015.

Men

Athlete	Event	Round of 32	Round of 16	Quarterfinals	Semifinals	Final	
Athlete	Event	Opposition Score	Opposition Score	Opposition Score	Opposition Score	Opposition Score	Rank
Chris Gordon	Singles	Bye	Enríquez (GUA); W 4–11, 11–7, 11–2, 11–2	Elías (PER); L 9–11, 7–11, 9–11	Did not advance		5
Todd Harrity	Singles	Bye	Escudero (PER); W 11–3, 11–8, 11–5	Delierre (CAN); L 8–11, 11–6, 10–12, 9–11	Did not advance		5
Chris Gordon; Chris Hanson	Doubles	—N/a	Bye	Bonilla; Enríquez (GUA); W 11–10, 11–7	Schnell; Schnell (CAN); L 10–11, 6–11	Did not advance	3rd place, bronze medalist(s)

Team

Athlete	Event	Pool play				Quarterfinals	Semifinals	Final	
Athlete	Event	Opposition Score	Opposition Score	Opposition Score	Rank	Opposition Score	Opposition Score	Opposition Score	Rank
Chris Gordon; Chris Hanson; Todd Harrity	Team	Guatemala; W 3–0, 3–0, 3–1	Chile; W 3–0, 3–0, 3–0	—N/a	1 Q	Colombia; W 3–0, 3–0	Mexico; L 2–3, 2–3	Did not advance	3rd place, bronze medalist(s)

Women

Athlete	Event	Round of 16	Quarterfinals	Semifinals	Final	
Athlete	Event	Opposition Score	Opposition Score	Opposition Score	Opposition Score	Rank
Olivia Clyne	Singles	Damasio (BRA); W 11–5, 11–8, 11–2	Pinto (CHI); W 11–3, 11–4, 11–7	Terán (MEX); W 11–7, 11–6, 11–7	Sobhy (USA); L 8–11, 3–11, 3–11	2nd place, silver medalist(s)
Amanda Sobhy	Singles	Bye	Serafini (BRA); W 11–7, 11–3, 11–3	Cornett (CAN); W 11–2, 3–11, 11–4, 11–6	Clyne (USA); W 11–8, 11–3, 11–3	1st place, gold medalist(s)
Natalie Grainger; Amanda Sobhy	Doubles	—N/a	Damasio; Veiga (BRA); W 11–3, 11–10	Peláez; Tovar (COL); W 11–6, 11–6	Cornett; Todd (CAN); W 11–9, 9–11, 11–6	1st place, gold medalist(s)

Team

Athlete	Event	Pool play				Semifinals	Final	
Athlete	Event	Opposition Score	Opposition Score	Opposition Score	Rank	Opposition Score	Opposition Score	Rank
Olivia Clyne; Natalie Grainger; Amanda Sobhy	Team	Chile; W 3–0, 3–0, 3–0	Guatemala; W 3–0, 3–0, 3–0	Mexico; W 3–0, 3–0, 3–0	1 Q	Colombia; W 3–0, 3–0	Canada; W 3–0, 3–0, 0–1	1st place, gold medalist(s)

== Swimming ==
The United States swimming team will consist of 36 athletes (18 male and 18 female), which is the maximum a nation may enter. The roster was officially named on October 30, 2014.

Men

Athlete	Event	Heat		Final	
Athlete	Event	Time	Rank	Time	Rank
Cullen Jones	50 m freestyle	22.12	2 FA	22.23	5
Josh Schneider	50 m freestyle	21.97	1 FA	21.86	1st place, gold medalist(s)
Cullen Jones	100 m freestyle	50.09	11 FB	DNS	
Darian Townsend	100 m freestyle	49.88	10 FB	49.97	11
Michael Klueh	200 m freestyle	1:48.67	4 FA	2:47.73	4
Michael Weiss	200 m freestyle	1:48.55	2 FA	1:47.63	3rd place, bronze medalist(s)
Michael Klueh	400 m freestyle	3:51.76	3 FA	3:50.53	4
Ryan Feeley	400 m freestyle	3:51.79	4 FA	3:49.69	2nd place, silver medalist(s)
Ryan Feeley	1500 m freestyle	—N/a		15:19.99	6
Andrew Gemmell	1500 m freestyle	—N/a		15:09.92	2nd place, silver medalist(s)
Eugene Godsoe	100 m backstroke	54.38	3 FA	53.96	3rd place, bronze medalist(s)
Nick Thoman	100 m backstroke	54.35	2 FA	53.20 PR	1st place, gold medalist(s)
Carter Griffin	200 m backstroke	1:58.54	2 FA	1:58.18	2nd place, silver medalist(s)
Sean Lehane	200 m backstroke	1:57.11 PR	1 FA	1:57.47	1st place, gold medalist(s)
Brad Craig	100 m breaststroke	1:01.29	5 FA	1:01.34	5
B.J. Johnson	100 m breaststroke	1:01.61	6 FA	1:01.77	7
Brad Craig	200 m breaststroke	2:14.31	9 FB	2:14.04	9
B.J. Johnson	200 m breaststroke	2:12.81	4 FA	2:12.19	4
Eugene Godsoe	100 m butterfly	52.89	8 FA	52.66	6
Giles Smith	100 m butterfly	52.13	1 FA	52.04 PR	1st place, gold medalist(s)
Bobby Bollier	200 m butterfly	1:58.61	3 FA	1:58.89	8
Ty Stewart	200 m butterfly	2:02.68	13 FB	2:02.59	14
Joseph Bentz	200 m individual medley	2:01.26	3 FA	2:00.04	3rd place, bronze medalist(s)
Ty Stewart	200 m individual medley	2:00.25	2 FA	2:01.83	5
Michael Weiss	400 m individual medley	4:17.98	2 FA	4:17.05	4
Max Williamson	400 m individual medley	4:17.92	1 FA	4:16.91	3rd place, bronze medalist(s)
Cullen Jones; Josh Schneider; Darian Townsend; Michael Weiss	4 × 100 m freestyle relay	3:18.94	3 FA	3:16.21	3rd place, bronze medalist(s)
Joseph Bentz; Michael Klueh; Darian Townsend; Michael Weiss	4 × 200 m freestyle relay	7:19.18	1 FA	7:12.20	2nd place, silver medalist(s)
Brad Craig; Josh Schneider; Giles Smith; Nick Thoman	4 × 100 m medley relay	3:38.99	1 FA	3:33.63	2nd place, silver medalist(s)
David Heron	10 km open water	—N/a		1:54:07.4	2nd place, silver medalist(s)
Chip Peterson	10 km open water	—N/a		1:54:03.6	1st place, gold medalist(s)

Qualification Legend: FA=Final A (medal); FB=Final B (non-medal)

Women

Athlete	Event	Heat		Final	
Athlete	Event	Time	Rank	Time	Rank
Natalie Coughlin	50 m freestyle	25.07	6 FA	24.66	3rd place, bronze medalist(s)
Madison Kennedy	50 m freestyle	24.75	2 FA	24.80	5
Natalie Coughlin	100 m freestyle	53.85 PR	1 FA	54.06	2nd place, silver medalist(s)
Amanda Weir	100 m freestyle	54.36	4 FA	55.73	8
Kiera Janzen	200 m freestyle	2:00.30	5 FA	2:00.34	6
Allison Schmitt	200 m freestyle	1:58.58	1 FA	1:56.23 PR	1st place, gold medalist(s)
Kiera Janzen	400 m freestyle	4:11.82	1 FA	4:11.32	5
Gillian Ryan	400 m freestyle	4:15.95	5 FA	4:09.46	3rd place, bronze medalist(s)
Courtney Harnish	800 m freestyle	—N/a		8:38.00	6
Sierra Schmidt	800 m freestyle	—N/a		8:27.54 PR	1st place, gold medalist(s)
Clara Smiddy	100 m backstroke	1:00.79	4 FA	1:00.49	3rd place, bronze medalist(s)
Olivia Smoliga	100 m backstroke	1:00.35 PR	1 FA	1:00.06	2nd place, silver medalist(s)
Clara Smiddy	200 m backstroke	2:11.94	3 FA	2:11.47	3rd place, bronze medalist(s)
Kylie Stewart	200 m backstroke	2:12.30	4 FA	2:11.92	4
Annie Lazor	100 m breaststroke	1:08.94	6 FA	1:08.72	5
Katie Meili	100 m breaststroke	1:05.64 PR	1 FA	1:06.26	1st place, gold medalist(s)
Annie Lazor	200 m breaststroke	2:26.37	2 FA	2:26.23	3rd place, bronze medalist(s)
Meghan Small	200 m breaststroke	2:32.40	10 FB	2:31.35	10
Gia Dalesandro	100 m butterfly	59.83	7 FA	59.24	6
Kelsi Worrell	100 m butterfly	57.24 PR	1 FA	57.78	1st place, gold medalist(s)
Kate Mills	200 m butterfly	2:08.89	1 FA	2:09.31	2nd place, silver medalist(s)
Kylie Stewart	200 m butterfly	2:16.22	11 FB	2:14.64	11
Caitlin Leverenz	200 m individual medley	2:11.04 PR	1 FA	2:10.51 PR	1st place, gold medalist(s)
Meghan Small	200 m individual medley	2:13.90	3 FA	2:11.26	2nd place, silver medalist(s)
Caitlin Leverenz	400 m individual medley	4:37.74 PR	1 FA	4:35.46 PR	1st place, gold medalist(s)
Kate Mills	400 m individual medley	4:41.05	4 FA	4:41.19	4
Natalie Coughlin; Madison Kennedy; Allison Schmitt; Amanda Weir	4 × 100 m freestyle relay	3:37.28 PR	1 FA	3:37.01	2nd place, silver medalist(s)
Courtney Harnish; Kiera Janzen; Gillian Ryan; Allison Schmitt	4 × 200 m freestyle relay	8:05.52	1 FA	7:54.32 PR	1st place, gold medalist(s)
Natalie Coughlin; Katie Meili; Allison Schmitt; Kelsi Worrell	4 × 100 m medley relay	3:57.35 PR	1 FA	3:56.53 PR	1st place, gold medalist(s)
Emily Brunemann	10 km open water	—N/a		2:03:17.5	4
Eva Fabian	10 km open water	—N/a		2:03:17.0	1st place, gold medalist(s)

Qualification Legend: FA=Final A (medal); FB=Final B (non-medal)

== Synchronized swimming ==
United States has qualified a full team of eight athletes.

	Event	Technical Routine		Free Routine (Final)			
	Event	Points	Rank	Points	Rank	Total Points	Rank
Mariya Koroleva; Alison Williams	Duet	82.5209	3	83.8667	3	166.3876	3rd place, bronze medalist(s)
Anita Alvarez; Claire Barton; Mary Killman; Mariya Koroleva; Sandra Ortellado; Sarah Rodriguez; Karensa Tjoa; Alison Williams	Team	82.6018	3	83.4333	3	166.0351	3rd place, bronze medalist(s)

== Table tennis ==
The United States has qualified a men's and women's team.

Men

Athlete	Event	Group Stage				Round of 32	Round of 16	Quarterfinals	Semifinals	Final	
Athlete	Event	Opposition Result	Opposition Result	Opposition Result	Rank	Opposition Result	Opposition Result	Opposition Result	Opposition Result	Opposition Result	Rank
Jimmy Butler	Singles	Calderano (BRA); L WO	Vila (DOM); L WO	Olivares (CHI); L WO	4	Did not advance					
Kanak Jha	Singles	Medjugorac (CAN); W 11–9, 13–11, 9–11, 11–5, 11–8	Tsuboi (BRA); L 14–16, 9–11, 4–11, 3–11	Coello (ECU); W 11–9, 11–8, 11–7, 11–6	2 Q	Alto (ARG); L 6–11, 11–8, 11–9, 6–11, 3–11, 10–12	Did not advance				
Timothy Wang	Singles	Tapia (ECU); W 11–8, 11–7, 12–14, 11–6, 9–11, 11–5	Alto (ARG); W 11–6, 11–9, 1–11, 5–11, 11–8, 11–13, 11–6	Moscoso (GUA); W 4–11, 11–9, 11–4, 10–12, 11–5, 11–5	1 Q	Bye	Thériault (CAN); L 9–11, 7–11, 12–10, 10–12, 7–11	Did not advance			
Jimmy Butler; Kanak Jha; Timothy Wang	Team	Brazil; W 3–0, 3–0, 3–2	Ecuador; W 3–1, 3–0, 2–3, 3–0	—N/a	1 Q	—N/a		Puerto Rico; L 3–2, 2–3, 2–3, 3–0, 0–3	Did not advance		

Women

Athlete	Event	Group Stage				Round of 32	Round of 16	Quarterfinals	Semifinals	Final	
Athlete	Event	Opposition Result	Opposition Result	Opposition Result	Rank	Opposition Result	Opposition Result	Opposition Result	Opposition Result	Opposition Result	Rank
Jennifer Wu	Singles	Brito (DOM); W 11–9, 11–8, 11–7, 11–6	Estrada (GUA); W 11–5, 11–2, 11–3, 11–3	Silva (MEX); W 12–10, 11–8, 11–5, 5–11, 11–5	1 Q	Bye	Lorenzotti (URU); W 9–11, 11–9, 11–6, 11–4, 11–6	Diaz (PUR); W 14–12, 11–5, 8–11, 11–7, 11–5	Kumahara (BRA); W 11–3, 11–4, 11–8, 11–7	Gui (BRA); W 11–8, 11–8, 4–11, 8–11, 10–12, 11–9, 11–7	1st place, gold medalist(s)
Lily Zhang	Singles	Low (CHI); W 11–7, 11–9, 11–9, 11–4	Diaz (PUR); W 11–5, 11–5, 11–4, 11–5	Galvez (ECU); W 11–7, 11–9, 11–5, 13–11	1 Q	Bye	Castellano (CHI); W 11–4, 11–1, 11–4, 11–4	Ruano (COL); W 11–7, 11–6, 11–8, 11–4	Gui (BRA); L 11–8, 8–11, 10–12, 5–11, 13–11, 11–2, 7–11	Did not advance	3rd place, bronze medalist(s)
Jiaqi Zheng	Singles	Cordero (PUR); W 11–8, 11–6, 13–11, 11–9	Gonzalez (VEN); W 12–10, 11–6, 11–6, 11–8	Kumahara (BRA); L 12–4, 11–6, 11–8, 11–13, 4–11, 11–5, 7–11	2 Q	Valdez (DOM); W 13–11, 11–2, 11–9, 11–8	Gui (BRA); L 11–9, 5–1, 11–8, 8–11, 8–11, 6–11	Did not advance			
Jennifer Wu; Lily Zhang; Jiaqi Zheng	Team	Dominican Republic; W 3–0, 3–0, 3–0	Argentina; W 3–0, 3–0, 3–0	—N/a	1 Q	—N/a		Cuba; W 3–0, 3–0, 3–1	Canada; W 3–0, 3–0, 3–0	Brazil; W 3–1, 3–2, 3–0	1st place, gold medalist(s)

== Taekwondo ==
The United States has qualified a full team of eight athletes (four men and four women).

Men

Athlete	Event	Round of 16	Quarterfinals	Semifinals	Repechage	Final / BM	
Athlete	Event	Opposition Result	Opposition Result	Opposition Result	Opposition Result	Opposition Result	Rank
Logan Gerrick	-58kg	Castillo (NCA); W 4–3	Torres (BRA); L 8–12	Did not advance			
Terrence Jennings	-68kg	Bye	Contreras (VEN); W 12–11	Potvin (CAN); L 11–13	—N/a	Trejos (COL); L 6–16	4
Steven López	-80kg	Rodas (GUA); W 12–4	Robles (CHI); W 4–3	Hernandez (DOM); L 2–3	Bye	Medina (VEN); W 7–3	3rd place, bronze medalist(s)
Philip Yun	+80kg	Edwards (JAM); W 7–0	Alba (CUB); L 3–15	Did not advance	Bye	Sio (ARG); W 9–2	3rd place, bronze medalist(s)

Women

Athlete	Event	Round of 16	Quarterfinals	Semifinals	Repechage	Final / BM	
Athlete	Event	Opposition Result	Opposition Result	Opposition Result	Opposition Result	Opposition Result	Rank
Charlotte Craig	-49kg	Zamora (GUA); L 1–4	Did not advance				
Cheyenne Lewis	-57kg	Bye	Nunez (CUB); W 8–6	Patiño (COL); W 8–2	Bye	Armeria (MEX); W 11–0	1st place, gold medalist(s)
Paige McPherson	-67kg	Bye	Villalon (CUB); W 5–3	Vasconcelos (BRA); W 8–6	Bye	Heredia (MEX); W 13–1	1st place, gold medalist(s)
Jackie Galloway	+67kg	Bye	Ferran (CUB); W 11–7	Galacho (BRA); W 5–0	Bye	Espinoza (MEX); W 1–0	1st place, gold medalist(s)

== Tennis ==
The U.S. qualified three male and three female tennis players to compete in the tournament.

Men

Athlete	Event	Round of 64	Round of 32	Round of 16	Quarterfinals	Semifinals	Final / BM	
Athlete	Event	Opposition Score	Opposition Score	Opposition Score	Opposition Score	Opposition Score	Opposition Score	Rank
Jean-Yves Aubone	Singles	Hach (MEX); W 3–6, 6–1, 6–3	Rodríguez (VEN); L 3–6, 6–4, 1–6	Did not advance				
Gonzales Austin	Singles	Zeballos (BOL); W 6–1, 6–2	Bester (CAN); L 4–6, 4–6	Did not advance				
Dennis Novikov	Singles	Bye	Luz (BRA); W 6–1, 7–6	Gómez (ECU); W 6–7, 6–3, 6–4	Schnur (CAN); W 6–3, 6–4	Bagnis (ARG); L 3–6, 7–6, 2–6	Andreozzi (ARG); W 6–4, 6–4	3rd place, bronze medalist(s)
Jean-Yves Aubone; Dennis Novikov	Doubles	—N/a		Diaz; Gonzalez (GUA); W 6–3, 6–2	Jarry; Podlipnik (CHI); L 7–5, 3–6, 3–10	Did not advance		

Women

Athlete	Event	Round of 32	Round of 16	Quarterfinals	Semifinals	Final / BM	
Athlete	Event	Opposition Score	Opposition Score	Opposition Score	Opposition Score	Opposition Score	Rank
Louisa Chirico	Singles	Weedon (GUA); W 7–6, 6–2	Dabrowski (CAN); L 3–6, 6–4, 4–6	Did not advance			
Lauren Davis	Singles	Bye	Botto (PER); W 6–3, 6–1	Cepede Royg (PAR); W 6–2, 3–6, 6–3	Duque (COL); L 1–6, 6–2, 3–6	Puig (PUR); L 6–2, 3–6, 3–6	4
Sachia Vickery	Singles	Rodríguez (MEX); L 3–6, 3–6	Did not advance				
Louisa Chirico; Lauren Davis	Doubles	—N/a		Irigoyen; Ormeachea (ARG); L 5–7, 4–6	Did not advance		

Mixed

Athlete	Event	Round of 16	Quarterfinals	Semifinals	Final / BM	
Athlete	Event	Opposition Score	Opposition Score	Opposition Score	Opposition Score	Rank
Gonzales Austin; Sachia Vickery	Doubles	Gámiz; Martínez (VEN); W 6–4, 6–3	Galeano; Cepede Royg (PAR); L 0–6, 3–6	Did not advance		

== Triathlon ==
The U.S. qualified the maximum of three men and three women for the triathlon event.

Athlete	Event	Swim (1.5 km)	Trans 1	Bike (40 km)	Trans 2	Run (10 km)	Total Time	Rank
Hunter Kemper	Men's	18:56	0:24	58:16	0:23	31:37	1:49:37	8
Eric Lagerstrom	Men's	19:04	0:24	58:06	0:20	32:55	1:50:51	17
Kevin McDowell	Men's	19:32	0:23	58:05	0:22	30:57	1:48:59	2nd place, silver medalist(s)
Chelsea Burns	Women's	20:15	0:35	1:00:52	0:25	36:21	1:58:29	5
Sarah Haskins	Women's	18:37	0:59	1:02:04	0:26	36:50	1:58:59	8
Erin Jones	Women's	20:13	0:40	1:05:26	0:26	39:12	2:05:52	19

== Volleyball ==
=== Beach ===
The United States has qualified a men's and women's pair for a total of four athletes.

Athlete	Event	Preliminary round				Quarterfinals	Semifinals	Finals	
Athlete	Event	Opposition Score	Opposition Score	Opposition Score	Rank	Opposition Score	Opposition Score	Opposition Score	Rank
Miles Evans; Ian Satterfield	Men's	Bissette; Clercent (LCA); W 2–0	Diaz; González (CUB); L 0–2	Capogrosso; Mehamed (ARG); L 0–2	3	Did not advance	9th–12th semifinal Henriquez; Villafañe (VEN); L 0–2	11th place final Lopez; Mora (NCA); W 2–0	11
Kelley Larsen; Betsi Metter	Women's	Molina; Soler (ESA); W 2–0	Orellana; Recinos (GUA); W 2–0	Galindo; Galindo (COL); W 2–0	1 Q	Gallay; Klug (ARG); L 0–2	5th–8th semifinal Gómez; Nieto (URU); W 2–0	5th place final Galindo; Galindo (COL); W 2–1	5

=== Indoor ===
The United States has qualified a men's and women's volleyball team, for a total of 24 athletes (12 men and 12 women).

==== Men's tournament ====
Team

- Taylor Averill
- Michael Brinkley
- Cody Caldwell
- Brian Cook
- Torey Defalco
- Kristopher Johnson
- Conrad Kaminski
- Zachary La Cavera
- Andrew Nally
- Benjamin Patch
- Jonah Seif
- Matthew West

Standings

Pos	Team	Pld	W	L	Pts	SPW	SPL	SPR	SW	SL	SR
1	Canada	3	3	0	12	280	249	1.124	9	3	3.000
2	Puerto Rico	3	2	1	10	268	248	1.081	7	4	1.750
3	United States	3	1	2	7	295	294	1.003	6	7	0.857
4	Mexico	3	0	3	1	195	247	0.789	1	9	0.111

Source: Archived 2016-03-04 at the Wayback Machine

Results

17 July 2015; 15:30	United States	1–3	Puerto Rico	Exhibition Centre, Toronto; Attendance: 1,700
17 July 2015; 15:30	(23–25, 26–24, 20–25, 26–28) result statistics			Exhibition Centre, Toronto; Attendance: 1,700

19 July 2015; 21:30	United States	3–1	Mexico	Exhibition Centre, Toronto; Attendance: 2,700
19 July 2015; 21:30	(20–25, 27–25, 25–16, 25–17) result statistics			Exhibition Centre, Toronto; Attendance: 2,700

21 July 2015; 19:05	Canada	3–2	United States	Exhibition Centre, Toronto; Attendance: 4,500
21 July 2015; 19:05	(19–25, 25–27, 25–23, 25–16, 15–12) result statistics			Exhibition Centre, Toronto; Attendance: 4,500

Quarterfinal

22 July 2015; 19:11	Argentina	3–0	United States	Exhibition Centre, Toronto; Attendance: 4,500
22 July 2015; 19:11	(25–16, 25–21, 25–15) result statistics			Exhibition Centre, Toronto; Attendance: 4,500

Fifth-place game

24 July 2015; 15:35	Cuba	3–1	United States	Exhibition Centre, Toronto; Attendance: 3,100
24 July 2015; 15:35	(28–30, 25–22, 25–14, 25–22) result statistics			Exhibition Centre, Toronto; Attendance: 3,100

2015 Pan American Games 6th place

United States

==== Women's tournament ====
Team

- Lauren Paolini #4
- Cassidy Lichtman #7
- Kristin Hildebrand #9
- Natalie Hagglund #10
- Nicole Fawcett #14
- Cursty Jackson #13
- Michelle Bartsch #16
- Falyn Fonoimoana #17
- Jenna Hagglund #20
- Rachael Adams #22
- Carli Lloyd #23
- Krista Vansant #24

Standings

Pos	Team	Pld	W	L	Pts	SPW	SPL	SPR	SW	SL	SR
1	Brazil	3	3	0	10	320	273	1.172	9	5	1.800
2	United States	3	2	1	12	254	200	1.270	8	3	2.667
3	Puerto Rico	3	1	2	7	232	247	0.939	5	6	0.833
4	Peru	3	0	3	1	164	250	0.656	1	9	0.111

Source: Archived 2015-10-20 at the Wayback Machine

Results

Date		Score		Set 1	Set 2	Set 3	Set 4	Set 5	Total	Report
Jul 16	United States	3–0	Peru	25–15	25–13	25–14			75–42	Report
Jul 18	United States	3–0	Puerto Rico	25–17	25–22	25–14			75–53	P2P3
Jul 20	United States	2–3	Brazil	25–22	21–25	25–18	22–25	11-15	104–105	P2P3

Quarterfinals

Date		Score		Set 1	Set 2	Set 3	Set 4	Set 5	Total	Report
Jul 22	United States	3–1	Cuba	25–18	25–19	22–25	25–18		97–80	P2 P3

Gold medal match

Date		Score		Set 1	Set 2	Set 3	Set 4	Set 5	Total	Report
Jul 25	Brazil	0–3	United States	22–25	21–25	26–28			69–78	P2 P3

2015 Pan American Games 1st place

United States

=== Quarterfinals ===
Date		Score		Set 1	Set 2	Set 3	Set 4	Set 5	Total	Report
Jul 22	United States	3–1	Cuba	25–18	25–19	22–25	25–18		97–80	P2 P3

=== Gold medal match ===
Date		Score		Set 1	Set 2	Set 3	Set 4	Set 5	Total	Report
Jul 25	Brazil	0–3	United States	22–25	21–25	26–28			69–78	P2 P3

2015 Pan American Games 2nd place

United States

== Water polo ==
The United States has qualified a men's and women's teams. Each team will consist of 13 athletes, for a total of 26.

Men's tournament

The following is the United States men's water polo squad.

- Merrill Moses
- Nikola Vavic
- Alex Obert
- Jackson Kimbell
- Alex Roelse
- Luca Cupido
- Josh Samuels
- Tony Azevedo
- Alex Bowen
- Bret Bonanni
- Jesse Smith
- John Mann
- McQuin Baron

Pool A

Team	Pld	W	D	L	GF	GA	GD	Pts	Qualification
United States	3	3	0	0	62	7	+55	6	Qualified for the semifinals
Argentina	3	1	1	1	31	29	+2	3	Qualified for the semifinals
Cuba	3	1	1	1	21	31	−10	3	
Ecuador	3	0	0	3	11	58	−47	0	

7 July 2015; 20:08	Report	United States	27–0	Ecuador	Markham Pan Am Centre; Referees: William Mackay (CAN), Edmundo Rodriguez (BRA)
7 July 2015; 20:08	Report	Score by quarters: 5–0, 8–0, 5–0, 9–0			Markham Pan Am Centre; Referees: William Mackay (CAN), Edmundo Rodriguez (BRA)
7 July 2015; 20:08	Report	Bonanni 9	Goals		Markham Pan Am Centre; Referees: William Mackay (CAN), Edmundo Rodriguez (BRA)

8 July 2015; 18:08	Report	United States	21–4	Cuba	Markham Pan Am Centre; Referees: Jaume Teixido (ESP), Stephane Roy (CAN)
8 July 2015; 18:08	Report	Score by quarters: 6–2, 3–0, 6–1, 6–1			Markham Pan Am Centre; Referees: Jaume Teixido (ESP), Stephane Roy (CAN)
8 July 2015; 18:08	Report	Samuels 4	Goals	4 players 1	Markham Pan Am Centre; Referees: Jaume Teixido (ESP), Stephane Roy (CAN)

11 July 2015; 16:08	Report	United States	14–3	Argentina	Markham Pan Am Centre; Referees: Arnoldo Zambrano (VEN), Stéphane Roy (CAN)
11 July 2015; 16:08	Report	Score by quarters: 3-1, 3-0, 4-1, 4-1			Markham Pan Am Centre; Referees: Arnoldo Zambrano (VEN), Stéphane Roy (CAN)
11 July 2015; 16:08	Report	Azevedo 4	Goals	Veich 2, Carabantes 1	Markham Pan Am Centre; Referees: Arnoldo Zambrano (VEN), Stéphane Roy (CAN)

Semifinal

13 July 2015; 18:00	Report	United States	9–8	Canada	Markham Pan Am Centre; Referees: Jaume Teixido (SPA), Thomas Mulnar (HUN)
13 July 2015; 18:00	Report	Score by quarters: 3-1, 1-2, 2-1, 3-4			Markham Pan Am Centre; Referees: Jaume Teixido (SPA), Thomas Mulnar (HUN)
13 July 2015; 18:00	Report	Cupido 3	Goals	Conway 3, Boyd 2, Vikalo 1, Graham 1, Taschereau 1	Markham Pan Am Centre; Referees: Jaume Teixido (SPA), Thomas Mulnar (HUN)

Gold medal game

15 July 2015; 20:00	Report	(gold) United States	11–9	Brazil (silver)	Markham Pan Am Centre; Referees: Thomas Molnar (HUN), Jaume Teixido (ESP)
15 July 2015; 20:00	Report	Score by quarters: 1-0, 6-5, 3-3, 1-1			Markham Pan Am Centre; Referees: Thomas Molnar (HUN), Jaume Teixido (ESP)
15 July 2015; 20:00	Report	2 Players 3	Goals	2 Players 3	Markham Pan Am Centre; Referees: Thomas Molnar (HUN), Jaume Teixido (ESP)

Women's tournament

United States' team roster:

- Samantha Hill
- Madeline Musselman
- Melissa Seidemann
- Rachel Fattal
- Caroline Clark
- Margaret Steffens
- Courtney Mathewson
- Kiley Neushul
- Ashley Grossman
- Kaleigh Gilchrist
- Makenzie Fischer
- Kameryn Craig
- Ashleigh Johnson

Pool A

Team	Pld	W	D	L	GF	GA	GD	Pts	Qualification
United States	3	3	0	0	73	9	+64	6	Qualified for the semifinals
Cuba	3	2	0	1	24	30	−6	4	Qualified for the semifinals
Argentina	3	1	0	2	16	48	−32	2	
Mexico	3	0	0	3	20	46	−26	0	

7 July 2015; 10:08	Report	Mexico	3–25	United States	Markham Pan Am Centre; Referees: Hugo Paredes (ECU), João Cardenuto (BRA)
7 July 2015; 10:08	Report	Score by quarters: 0–6, 1–10, 0–7, 2–2			Markham Pan Am Centre; Referees: Hugo Paredes (ECU), João Cardenuto (BRA)
7 July 2015; 10:08	Report	Rios 2	Goals	Steffens, Grossman 4	Markham Pan Am Centre; Referees: Hugo Paredes (ECU), João Cardenuto (BRA)

8 July 2015; 10:08	Report	United States	18–3	Cuba	Markham Pan Am Centre; Referees: Edmundo Rodrigues (BRA), William Mackay (CAN)
8 July 2015; 10:08	Report	Score by quarters: 4–1, 4–0, 6–1, 4–1			Markham Pan Am Centre; Referees: Edmundo Rodrigues (BRA), William Mackay (CAN)
8 July 2015; 10:08	Report	Steffens, Fischer 3	Goals	3 players 1	Markham Pan Am Centre; Referees: Edmundo Rodrigues (BRA), William Mackay (CAN)

11 July 2015; 08:08	Report	United States	30–3	Argentina	Markham Pan Am Centre; Referees: Hugo Parades (VEN), Edmundo Rodrigues (BRA)
11 July 2015; 08:08	Report	Score by quarters: 8-0, 6-1, 6-1, 10-1			Markham Pan Am Centre; Referees: Hugo Parades (VEN), Edmundo Rodrigues (BRA)
11 July 2015; 08:08	Report	Clark 7	Goals	Font 2, Hatcher 1	Markham Pan Am Centre; Referees: Hugo Parades (VEN), Edmundo Rodrigues (BRA)

Semifinal

12 July 2015; 20:00	Report	United States	16–3	Brazil	Markham Pan Am Centre; Referees: Thomas Molnar (HUN), Jaume Teixido (SPA)
12 July 2015; 20:00	Report	Score by quarters: 3-1, 6-1, 5-0, 2-1			Markham Pan Am Centre; Referees: Thomas Molnar (HUN), Jaume Teixido (SPA)
12 July 2015; 20:00	Report	Steffens 3	Goals	Palaro 1	Markham Pan Am Centre; Referees: Thomas Molnar (HUN), Jaume Teixido (SPA)

Gold medal game

14 July 2015; 20:00	Report	(gold) United States	13–4	Canada (silver)	Markham Pan Am Centre; Referees: Thomas Molnar (HUN), Jaume Teixido (SPA)
14 July 2015; 20:00	Report	Score by quarters: 3-2, 3-1, 4-0, 3-1			Markham Pan Am Centre; Referees: Thomas Molnar (HUN), Jaume Teixido (SPA)
14 July 2015; 20:00	Report	2 players 4	Goals	Eggens 2	Markham Pan Am Centre; Referees: Thomas Molnar (HUN), Jaume Teixido (SPA)

== Water skiing ==
The United States qualified four water skiers and one wakeboarder.

Men

Athlete	Event	Preliminary/Semifinal		Final	
Athlete	Event	Score	Rank	Score	Rank
Adam Pickos	Slalom	3.00/58/11.25	6	Did not advance	
Nate Smith	Slalom	2.00/58/10.25	1 Q	1.00/58/10.25	1st place, gold medalist(s)
Adam Pickos	Tricks	10920	1 Q	11110	1st place, gold medalist(s)
Adam Pickos	Overall	—N/a		DNS	
Daniel Powers	Wakeboard	72.88	2 Q	80.44	2nd place, silver medalist(s)

Women

Athlete	Event	Preliminary		Final	
Athlete	Event	Score	Rank	Score	Rank
Regina Jaquess	Jump	49.9	1 Q	49.1	1st place, gold medalist(s)
Erika Lang	Jump	32.0	8	Did not advance	
Regina Jaquess	Slalom	1.00/55/10.75	2 Q	3.00/55/11.25	2nd place, silver medalist(s)
Erika Lang	Slalom	3.00/55/12.00	4 Q	2.00/55/12.00	3rd place, bronze medalist(s)
Regina Jaquess	Tricks	6480	4 Q	4100	6
Erika Lang	Tricks	8590	1 Q	8000	3rd place, bronze medalist(s)
Regina Jaquess	Overall	—N/a		2670.3	2nd place, silver medalist(s)
Erika Lang	Overall	—N/a		2032.4	4

== Weightlifting ==
The United States has qualified a team of 5 athletes (3 men and 2 women).

Athlete	Event	Snatch		Clean & Jerk		Total	Rank
Athlete	Event	Result	Rank	Result	Rank	Total	Rank
Travis Cooper	Men's 77 kg	146	=3	179	6	325	4
Kendrick Farris	Men's 94 kg	163	2	203	1	366	1st place, gold medalist(s)
Norik Vardanian	Men's 94 kg	160	=3	202	2	362	2nd place, silver medalist(s)
Morghan King	Women's 48 kg	79	3	93	4	172	4
Melanie Roach	Women's 53 kg	72	7	96	=5	168	7

== Wrestling ==
The United States qualified wrestlers in every event except the women's 58 kg and 69 kg weight classes.

Men

Athlete	Event	Round of 16	Quarterfinals	Semifinals	Final / BM	
Athlete	Event	Opposition Result	Opposition Result	Opposition Result	Opposition Result	Rank
Angel Escobedo	Freestyle 57 kg	—N/a	Hernandez (COL); W 4–0 ^{ST}	Benites (PER); W 5–0 ^{VT}	Bonne (CUB); L 0–4 ^{ST}	2nd place, silver medalist(s)
Brent Metcalf	Freestyle 65 kg	Bye	Miranda (GUA); W 4–0 ^{ST}	Gómez (PUR); W 3–1 ^{PP}	Maren (CUB); W 3–1 ^{PP}	1st place, gold medalist(s)
Jordan Burroughs	Freestyle 74 kg	Bye	López (CUB); W 4–1 ^{SP}	Balfour (CAN); W 4–0 ^{ST}	Blanco (ECU); W 4–0 ^{ST}	1st place, gold medalist(s)
Jake Herbert	Freestyle 86 kg	—N/a	Baez (ARG); W 4–0 ^{ST}	Espinal (PUR); W 4–0 ^{ST}	Salas (CUB); L 1–3 ^{PP}	2nd place, silver medalist(s)
Kyle Snyder	Freestyle 97 kg	—N/a	Maier (ARG); W 4–1 ^{SP}	Díaz (VEN); W 4–0 ^{ST}	Gill (CAN); W 4–0 ^{ST}	1st place, gold medalist(s)
Zach Rey	Freestyle 125 kg	—N/a	Silva (ESA); W 5–0 ^{VT}	Ramos (CUB); W 3–0 ^{PO}	Jarvis (CAN); W 3–0 ^{PO}	1st place, gold medalist(s)
Spenser Mango	Greco-Roman 59 kg	Bye	Borrero (CUB); W 3–1 ^{PP}	Montaño (COL); L 1–4 ^{SP}	Ramirez (DOM); W 3–1 ^{PP}	3rd place, bronze medalist(s)
Bryce Saddoris	Greco-Roman 66 kg	—N/a	Molina (PER); W 3-0 ^{PO}	Mejia (HON); W 4-0 ^{ST}	Rivas (VEN); L 1-4 ^{SP}	2nd place, silver medalist(s)
Andy Bisek	Greco-Roman 75 kg	—N/a	Avendaño (VEN); W 4-0 ^{ST}	Escobar (MEX); W 4-0 ^{ST}	Almendra (PAN); W 4-0 ^{ST}	1st place, gold medalist(s)
Jon Anderson	Greco-Roman 85 kg	—N/a	Martinez (HON); W 4-0 ^{ST}	Vera (CUB); W 4-0 ^{ST}	Perez (VEN); W 4-0 ^{ST}	1st place, gold medalist(s)
Caylor Williams	Greco-Roman 98 kg	—N/a	Perez (VEN); L 1-4 ^{SP}	Did not advance		7
Robby Smith	Greco-Roman 130 kg	—N/a	Lopez (PUR); W 5-0 ^{VT}	López (CUB); L 0-4 ^{ST}	Perez (VEN); W 0-0 ^{VF}	3rd place, bronze medalist(s)

Key: VT=Victory by fall; VF=Victory by forfeit; ST=Victory by great superiority; SP=Victory by technical superiority; PP=Victory by points, loser with technical points; PO=Victory by points, loser without technical points

Women

Athlete	Event	Quarterfinals	Semifinals	Final / BM	
Athlete	Event	Opposition Result	Opposition Result	Opposition Result	Rank
Alyssa Lampe	48 kg	Morrison (CAN); L 1–3 ^{PP}	Did not advance	Guzmán (CUB); W 4–1 ^{SP}	3rd place, bronze medalist(s)
Whitney Conder	53 kg	Bye	Del Valle (CUB); W 5–0 ^{VT}	Valencia (MEX); W 3–1 ^{PP}	1st place, gold medalist(s)
Erin Clodgo	63 kg	Vidiaux (CUB); L 1–3 ^{PP}	Did not advance	Antes (ECU); W 5–0 ^{VB}	3rd place, bronze medalist(s)
Adeline Gray	75 kg	Ferreira (BRA); W 4–0 ^{ST}	González (PUR); W 4–0 ^{ST}	Distasio (CAN); W 3–1 ^{PP}	1st place, gold medalist(s)

Key: VT=Victory by fall; VB=Victory by injury; ST=Victory by great superiority; SP=Victory by technical superiority; PP=Victory by points, loser with technical points; PO=Victory by points, loser without technical points

== See also ==
- United States at the 2016 Summer Olympics
