= Gymnastics at the 2015 Pan American Games – Men's horizontal bar =

Men's horizontal bar at the 2015 Pan American Games
- Venue: Toronto Coliseum
- Dates: July 15
- Competitors: 47
- Winning score: 15.700

Medalists
Gold medal	Jossimar Calvo	Colombia
Silver medal	Kevin Lytwyn	Canada
Bronze medal	Paul Ruggeri	United States

The men's horizontal bar gymnastic event at the 2015 Pan American Games was held on July 15 at the Toronto Coliseum.

== Schedule ==
All times are Eastern Standard Time (UTC-3).

Date	Time	Round
July 15, 2015	15:30	Final

== Results ==
=== Qualification ===
Position	Gymnast	Horizontal bar	Notes
1	Jossimar Calvo (COL)	15.450	Q
2	Paul Ruggeri (USA)	15.400	Q
3	Kevin Lytwyn (CAN)	15.300	Q
4	Samuel Mikulak (USA)	15.100	Q
5	Manrique Larduet (CUB)	15.050	Q
6	Arthur Mariano (BRA)	15.000	Q
7	Randy Leru (CUB)	14.900	Q
8	Lucas Bitencourt (BRA)	14.700	Q
9	Kevin Cerda Castellum (MEX)	14.650	R
10	Audrys Nin Reyes (DOM)	14.650	R
11	Angel Ramos (PUR)	14.600	R

=== Final ===
Position	Gymnast	Horizontal bar	Notes
1st place, gold medalist(s)	Jossimar Calvo (COL)	15.700	
2nd place, silver medalist(s)	Kevin Lytwyn (CAN)	15.475	
3rd place, bronze medalist(s)	Paul Ruggeri (USA)	15.450	
4	Manrique Larduet (CUB)	15.250	
5	Randy Leru (CUB)	15.025	
6	Samuel Mikulak (USA)	14.575	
7	Lucas Bitencourt (BRA)	14.475	
8	Arthur Mariano (BRA)	14.025	
