= Gymnastics at the 2015 Pan American Games – Women's uneven bars =

Women's uneven bars at the 2015 Pan American Games
- Venue: Toronto Coliseum
- Dates: July 14
- Competitors: 45
- Winning score: 14.725

Medalists
Gold medal	Rachel Gowey	United States
Silver medal	Jessica López	Venezuela
Bronze medal	Amelia Hundley	United States

The women's uneven bars gymnastic event at the 2015 Pan American Games was held on July 14 at the Toronto Coliseum.

== Schedule ==
All times are Eastern Standard Time (UTC-3).

Date	Time	Round
July 14, 2015	15:30	Final

== Results ==
=== Qualification ===
Madison Desch and Megan Skaggs of the United States finished in 4th and 9th respectively, but did they not progress to the final because only two athletes per country can qualify for finals.

Position	Gymnast	Uneven bars	Notes
1	Rachel Gowey (USA)	14.750	Q
2	Amelia Hundley (USA)	14.500	Q
3	Jessica López (VEN)	14.300	Q
4	Isabela Onyshko (CAN)	14.300	Q
5	Ana Sofía Gómez (GUA)	14.250	Q
6	Madison Copiak (CAN)	13.800	Q
7	Ahtziri Sandoval (MEX)	13.800	Q
8	Elsa García (MEX)	13.600	Q
9	Flávia Saraiva (BRA)	13.400	R
10	Marcia Videaux (CUB)	13.350	R
11	Marcela Sandoval (COL)	13.200	R

=== Final ===
Position	Gymnast	Uneven bars	Notes
1st place, gold medalist(s)	Rachel Gowey (USA)	14.725	
2nd place, silver medalist(s)	Jessica López (VEN)	14.700	
3rd place, bronze medalist(s)	Amelia Hundley (USA)	14.650	
4	Elsa García (MEX)	13.950	
5	Ana Sofía Gómez (GUA)	13.900	
6	Ahtziri Sandoval (MEX)	13.775	
7	Madison Copiak (CAN)	13.600	
8	Isabela Onyshko (CAN)	13.325	
