= Philip W. Yun =

American lawyer

- Born: 1959 (age 66–67); Providence, Rhode Island
- Occupations: Co-President & Co-CEO, Commonwealth Club World Affairs

Philip W. Yun is a scholar, lawyer, nonprofit and private sector executive, and former United States government official. From 1994 to 2001, he was a senior policy advisor at the Bureau of East Asian and Pacific Affairs of the United States Department of State under President Bill Clinton. Yun specializes in international security policy and foreign affairs, particularly East Asia and North Korea. His writings have been published in the Los Angeles Times, The National Interest, U.S. News & World Report, and The Hill. As of 2019 Yun is the co-president and co-CEO of Commonwealth Club World Affairs.

== Early life and education ==
Yun was born in Providence, Rhode Island in 1959. His father had been born in what is now South Korea, and his mother had been born in what is now North Korea. In 1967, his family moved to Athens, Ohio, where Yun attended high school.

In 1977, Yun attended Brown University, graduating magna cum laude and Phi Beta Kappa with an A.B. degree in mathematical economics. He later studied at Columbia University School of Law, where he became the associate editor of the Columbia Journal of Transnational Law. Yun graduated from Columbia University School of Law with a J.D. in 1984. Yun later became a Fulbright Scholar, a research fellowship at the Yonsei University Graduate School of International Studies in 1987. His work focused on Korean political development, trade law and the General Agreement on Tariffs and Trade.

== Career ==
Yun got his start in US politics as a national staffer on the 1984 presidential campaign of Walter Mondale. In 1987, Yun began practicing law, working as a foreign legal consultant at the firm of Shin & Kim in Seoul, Korea. He also practiced at the firms of Pillsbury, Madison & Sutro in San Francisco and Garvey Schubert & Barer in Seattle. He later served as a national staffer on the 1988 presidential campaign of Michael Dukakis, and on the 1992 presidential campaign of Bill Clinton.

=== Clinton Administration ===
Following the election of Bill Clinton to the US presidency, Yun became a presidential appointee at the US Department of State, serving as Senior Advisor to the Assistant Secretary of State for East Asian and Pacific Affairs. During this time, he also worked as a senior advisor to two US Coordinators for North Korea Policy, former Secretary of Defense William J. Perry and former Under Secretary of State Wendy Sherman. Yun accompanied both to North Korea in 1999. From 1999 to 2001, Yun was a member of a government working group that managed US policy and negotiations with North Korea under President Clinton. Yun was a member of the US delegation that traveled to North Korea with Secretary of State Madeleine Albright in October 2000.

=== Private industry, academia, and non-profit ===
After leaving government, Yun became vice president at H&Q Asia Pacific, a private equity firm, in 2001. In 2004, Yun joined the Asia–Pacific Research Center at Stanford University as the first Pantech Scholar in Korean Studies, where his research focused on the economic and political future of Northeast Asia. In 2005, he became vice president of The Asia Foundation, serving in this capacity until 2011. As of 2019 he is the Co-President and Co-CEO of Commonwealth Club World Affairs alongside Gloria Duffy.

== Select bibliography ==
- Yun, Philip; Gi-Wook, Shin, eds. (February 15, 2006). North Korea: 2005 and Beyond. Shorenstein Asia-Pacific Research Center. ISBN 978-1931368087.
