= Artistic gymnastics at the 2006 Central American and Caribbean Games – Women's teams =

The women's artistic team competition of the gymnastics events at the 2006 Central American and Caribbean Games were held in Cartagena, Colombia, on July 17.

== Final ==
Position	Country	Vault (gymnastics)	Uneven bars	Balance beam	Floor (gymnastics)	Total
1st place, gold medalist(s)	Mexico; Elsa García; Marisela Cantú; Daniela De León; Yeny Ibarra; Yessenia Estrada; Laura Moreno	57.275	54.400	56.075	54.700	222.450
2nd place, silver medalist(s)	Cuba; Jennifer Alique; Virgen Cusa; Dunas Lamas; Yaidelin Rojas; Yahajara Sese; Madelen Tamayo	56.125	52.250	54.600	53.275	216.250
3rd place, bronze medalist(s)	Venezuela; Fanny Briceño; Maciel Peña; Ivet Rojas; Johanny Sotillo; Eddylin Zabaleta	55.875	51.475	53.625	51.575	212.550
4	Colombia; Viviana Aristizabal; Catalina Escobar; Jessica Gil; Paola Gutiérrez; Nathalia Sánchez; Bibiana Vélez	55.725	50.750	52.475	51.600	210.550
5	Puerto Rico; Leysha López; Bernice Martínez; Maricarmen Rivera; Sidney Sanabria; Gabriela Sanguineti; Karlyann Santiago	54.100	49.425	50.875	51.775	206.175
6	Guatemala; Elisa Estrada; Sabrina Lau; Emely Monzón; Monica Yool	53.875	43.200	50.900	52.725	200.700
7	Costa Rica; Bárbara Fournier; María González; Karina Regidor	37.575	29.650	34.050	35.275	136.550
8	Dominican Republic; Ninoska Ortiz; Yamilet Peña	26.175	10.975	19.825	20.525	77.500
