= Artistic gymnastics at the 2006 Central American and Caribbean Games – Women's artistic individual all-around =

The women's artistic individual all-around competition of the gymnastics events at the 2006 Central American and Caribbean Games was held on July 17–18 in Cartagena, Colombia.

== Final ==
Position	Gymnast	Vault (gymnastics)	Uneven bars	Balance beam	Floor (gymnastics)	Total
1st place, gold medalist(s)	Elsa García (MEX)	14.766	15.200	13.533	14.833	58.332
2nd place, silver medalist(s)	Marisela Cantú (MEX)	14.266	14.166	13.800	13.900	56.132
3rd place, bronze medalist(s)	Yessenia Estrada (MEX)	14.133	14.466	13.333	14.166	56.098
4	Maciel Peña (VEN)	14.000	14.033	12.800	13.966	54.799
5	Nathalia Sánchez (COL)	13.833	12.800	14.533	13.466	54.632
6	Ivet Rojas (VEN)	13.866	13.666	13.400	13.166	54.098
7	Jessica Gil (COL)	14.166	12.000	13.900	13.800	53.866
8	Bibiana Vélez (COL)	14.333	13.333	12.066	13.866	53.598
9	Johanny Sotillo (VEN)	13.333	13.933	12.166	13.633	53.065
10	Emely Monzón (GUA)	13.866	11.133	13.500	13.000	51.499
10	Elisa Estrada (GUA)	13.800	11.333	13.333	13.033	51.499
12	Madelen Tamayo (CUB)	13.466	13.066	12.066	12.833	51.431
13	Sidney Sanabria (PUR)	13.333	11.600	12.166	14.166	51.265
14	Monica Yool (GUA)	12.966	12.966	13.200	12.066	51.198
15	Jahara Sese (CUB)	13.466	13.766	12.166	11.700	51.098
16	Yaidelin Rojas (CUB)	14.033	11.100	13.933	11.833	50.899
17	Leysha López (PUR)	13.233	13.000	12.133	11.600	49.966
18	Gabriela Sanguineti (PUR)	13.633	11.700	11.866	12.600	49.799
19	María González (CRC)	12.633	10.533	10.733	10.533	44.432
20	Karina Regidor (CRC)	12.500	8.500	10.223	10.766	41.999
21	Barbara Fourmier (CRC)	12.366	7.200	10.366	11.433	41.365
22	Yamilet Peña (DOM)	12.433	7.700	9.933	9.433	39.499
23	Ninoska Ortíz (DOM)	12.133	1.100	10.633	9.500	33.566

== Qualification ==
Position	Gymnast	Vault (gymnastics)	Uneven bars	Balance beam	Floor (gymnastics)	Total	Q
1	Elsa García (MEX)	14.675	14.500	13.975	14.100	57.250	Q
2	Marisela Cantú (MEX)	14.200	13.100	14.300	13.375	54.975	Q
3	Yessenia Estrada (MEX)	14.025	13.600	12.850	13.900	54.375	Q
4	Jahara Sese (CUB)	14.725	12.600	13.425	13.475	54.225	Q
5	Yeni Ibarra (MEX)	14.150	12.875	13.725	13.325	54.075	
6	Jessica Gil (COL)	13.875	12.725	14.025	13.175	53.800	Q
7	Maciel Peña (VEN)	14.200	12.100	13.675	13.525	53.500	Q
8	Nathalia Sánchez (COL)	13.675	12.125	14.400	13.225	53.425	Q
9	Ivet Rojas (VEN)	14.000	12.900	13.650	12.825	53.375	Q
10	Bibiana Vélez (COL)	14.350	13.825	11.550	13.575	53.300	Q
11	Dumas Lamas (CUB)	14.050	11.800	13.750	13.525	53.125	
12	Johanny Sotillo (VEN)	13.500	13.450	13.075	12.825	52.850	Q
13	Fanny Briceño (VEN)	13.800	13.025	13.225	12.400	52.450	
14	Monica Yool (GUA)	12.925	12.825	13.350	13.075	52.175	Q
15	Leysha López (PUR)	13.725	12.725	13.100	12.300	51.850	Q
16	Madelen Tamayo (CUB)	13.450	13.600	13.450	11.275	51.775	Q
17	Yaidelin Rojas (CUB)	11.050	13.025	13.975	13.325	51.375	Q
18	Gabriela Sanguineti (PUR)	13.625	12.375	12.525	12.400	50.925	Q
19	Sidney Sanabria (PUR)	13.500	12.025	11.200	14.000	50.725	Q
20	Elisa Estrada (GUA)	13.850	10.225	12.350	13.350	49.775	Q
21	Emely Monzón (GUA)	13.450	10.100	12.900	13.250	49.600	Q
22	Sabrina Lau (GUA)	13.650	10.150	12.300	13.050	49.150	
23	Catalina Escobar (COL)	13.825	11.825	12.475	10.950	49.075	
24	Karlyann Santiago (PUR)	13.075	10.825	12.075	12.950	48.925	
25	Barbara Fourmier (CRC)	12.500	9.425	11.975	11.950	45.850	Q
26	María González (CRC)	12.825	10.625	10.675	11.250	45.375	Q
27	Karina Regidor (CRC)	12.250	9.600	11.400	12.075	45.325	Q
28	Yamilet Peña (DOM)	13.375	9.525	10.050	10.375	43.325	Q
29	Jennifer Alique (CUB)	13.900		13.150	12.950	40.000	
30	Maricarmen Rivera (PUR)	13.250		13.175	12.425	38.850	
31	Viviana Aristizabal (COL)	13.025		11.575	11.625	36.225	
32	Ninoska Ortíz (DOM)	12.800	1.450	9.775	10.150	34.175	Q
33	Laura Moreno (MEX)	14.250	13.200			27.450	
34	Daniela De León (MEX)			14.075	13.275	27.350	
35	Eddylin Zabaleta (VEN)	13.875	11.675			25.550	
36	Valeska Montero (VEN)			12.925	12.075	25.000	
37	Virgen Cusa (CUB)		13.025			13.025	
38	Berenice Martínez (PUR)		12.300			12.300	
39	Paola Gutierrez (COL)		12.075			12.075	
