= Artistic gymnastics at the 2010 Central American and Caribbean Games – Women's artistic individual all-around =

The women's artistic individual all-around competition of the gymnastics events at the 2010 Central American and Caribbean Games was held on July 28 in Hormigueros Gymnastics Pavilion at Porta del Sol, Mayagüez, Puerto Rico.

== Final ==
Position	Gymnast	Floor (gymnastics)	Vault (gymnastics)	Uneven bars	Balance beam	Total
1st place, gold medalist(s)	Jessica López (VEN)	13.900	14.050	13.850	14.750	56.550
2nd place, silver medalist(s)	Elsa García (MEX)	14.300	14.450	13.600	13.600	55.950
3rd place, bronze medalist(s)	Nathalia Sánchez (COL)	13.150	13.600	13.800	14.550	55.100
4	Monica Yool (GUA)	13.000	13.650	13.450	13.300	53.400
5	Ana Lago (MEX)	13.700	13.950	11.700	12.500	51.850
6	Sidney Sanabria (PUR)	12.900	13.650	12.650	12.550	51.750
7	Nicolle Vasquez (PUR)	13.050	14.000	11.700	12.000	50.750
8	Adriana Ruano (GUA)	12.550	13.350	12.450	12.000	50.350
9	Therma Williams (TRI)	11.850	13.050	12.300	11.800	49.000
10	Ivet Rojas (VEN)	12.450	13.550	13.050	9.800	48.850
11	Mariana Sánchez (CRC)	11.700	13.000	12.250	10.500	47.450
12	Karina Regidor (CRC)	12.000	13.000	11.050	10.200	46.250
13	Yamilet Peña (DOM)	12.000	13.900	10.850	9.000	45.750
14	Montserrat Armenteros (DOM)	10.100	12.900	6.400	10.300	39.700
15	Morgan Beckles (BER)	9.750	12.300	8.500	8.700	39.250
16	Rosie Finnigan (BER)	9.950	11.450	7.650	7.150	36.200

== Qualification ==
Position	Gymnast	Floor (gymnastics)	Vault (gymnastics)	Uneven bars	Balance beam	Total	Q
1	Elsa García (MEX)	13.400	14.000	14.100	13.700	55.200	Q
2	Jessica López (VEN)	12.350	14.000	14.300	14.500	55.150	Q
3	Nathalia Sánchez (COL)	13.050	12.650	13.750	13.100	52.550	Q
4	Ana Lago (MEX)	13.500	13.300	12.300	13.000	52.100	Q
5	Monica Yool (GUA)	12.850	13.550	13.100	12.550	52.050	Q
6	Sidney Sanabria (PUR)	13.050	13.250	12.950	12.500	51.750	Q
7	Ivet Rojas (VEN)	12.250	13.500	13.150	12.400	51.300	Q
8	Adriana Ruano (GUA)	12.300	13.300	12.300	12.250	50.150	Q
9	Mariana Sánchez (CRC)	12.650	12.800	12.200	12.300	49.950	Q
10	Yessenia Estrada (MEX)	12.000	12.800	12.600	12.450	49.850	
11	Maciel Peña (VEN)	11.750	13.450	12.850	11.650	49.700	
12	Leysha López (PUR)	12.250	12.700	11.750	12.600	49.300	Q
13	Johanny Sotillo (VEN)	11.100	13.050	13.100	12.000	49.250	
14	Nicolle Vasquez (PUR)	13.050	14.000	11.700	12.000	50.750	
15	Cindy Ruiz (VEN)	11.450	12.850	9.300	12.700	46.300	
16	Karina Regidor (CRC)	12.100	13.100	10.750	10.050	46.000	Q
17	Yamilet Peña (DOM)	11.000	13.600	11.400	9.600	45.600	Q
18	Therma Williams (TRI)	12.800	13.100	7.650	11.550	45.100	Q
19	Andrea López (PUR)	11.900	12.400	10.400	10.300	45.000	
20	Morgan Beckles (BER)	9.950	12.100	8.400	9.050	39.500	Q
21	Montserrat Armenteros (DOM)	9.150	12.350	7.300	10.050	38.850	Q
22	Alexa Moreno (MEX)	13.000	13.450		12.100	38.550	
23	Daniela De León (MEX)	12.300	13.600	10.500		36.400	
24	Rosie Finnigan (BER)	9.600	10.600	7.050	7.550	34.800	Q
25	Marisela Cantu (MEX)			13.200	12.550	25.750	
26	Bibiana Rodríguez (PUR)		12.950	11.300		24.250	
27	Marcela Aparicio (ESA)	10.950	12.650			23.600	
28	Dimarys López (PUR)	11.300			11.450	22.750	
29	Sofía Bonilla (CRC)	9.300	12.200	0.000		21.500	
