= Artistic gymnastics at the 2006 Central American and Caribbean Games =

- Dates: 15–30 July 2006

The artistic gymnastics competition of the 2006 Central American and Caribbean Games was held in Cartagena, Colombia, from 15–30 July 2006.

== Medal summary ==
=== Men's events ===
| Event | Gold | Silver | Bronze |
|---|---|---|---|
| Individual All-Around | Luis Vargas (PUR) | Luis Rivera (PUR) | Jorge Giraldo (COL) |
| Floor | Alexander Rodríguez (PUR) | Luis Rivera (PUR) | Daniel Corral (MEX) |
| Vault | Luis Rivera (PUR) | Fernando Fuentes (VEN) | Alexander Rodríguez (PUR) |
| Parallel bars | Jorge Giraldo (COL) | José Fuentes (VEN) | Luis Vargas (PUR) |
| Pommel horse | Luis Rivera (PUR); Luis Vargas (PUR) | | Jorge Giraldo (COL) |
| Rings | Regulo Carmona (VEN) | Luis Rivera (PUR) | Tommy Ramos (PUR) |
| Horizontal bar | Jorge Giraldo (COL) | Alexander Rodríguez (PUR); José Fuentes (VEN) | |
| Team | Puerto Rico; Reinaldo Oquendo; Tommy Ramos; Ángel Ramos; Luis Rivera; Alexander Rodríguez; Luis Vargas | Mexico; Manuel Alemán; Daniel Corral; Santiago López; Miguel Monreal; Joaquin Ramírez; Luis Sosa | Cuba; Irving Arroyo; Abel Driggs; Gerardo Medina; Fidel Silot; Jorge Soria; Reinier Villardi |

=== Women's events ===
| Event | Gold | Silver | Bronze |
|---|---|---|---|
| Individual All-Around (details) | Elsa García (MEX) | Marisela Cantu (MEX) | Yessenia Estrada (MEX) |
| Floor (details) | Elsa García (MEX) | Sidney Sanabria (PUR) | Maciel Peña (VEN) |
| Vault (details) | Yeni Ibarra (MEX) | Eddylin Zabaleta (VEN) | Elsa García (MEX) |
| Uneven bars (details) | Elsa García (MEX) | Yessenia Estrada (MEX) | Johanny Sotillo (VEN) |
| Beam (details) | Marisela Cantu (MEX) | Nathalia Sánchez (COL) | Ivet Rojas (VEN) |
| Team (details) | Mexico; Marisela Cantu; Daniela De León; Yessenia Estrada; Elsa García; Yeni Ibarra; Laura Moreno | Cuba; Jennifer Alique; Virgen Cusa; Dunas Lamas; Yaidelin Rojas; Jahara Sese; Madelen Tamayo | Venezuela; Fanny Briceño; Maciel Peña; Ivet Rojas; Johanny Sotillo; Eddylin Zabaleta |

== See also ==
- Rhythmic gymnastics at the 2006 Central American and Caribbean Games
