= Jorge Hugo Giraldo =

Colombian artistic gymnast (born 1979)

- Full name: Jorge Hugo Giraldo López
- Born: 5 September 1979 (age 47)

Gymnastics career
- Discipline: Men's artistic gymnastics
- Country represented: Colombia; (1997–2016)
Medal record
Pacific Rim Championships
Gold medal – first place	2012 Everett	Parallel bars
Bronze medal – third place	2014 Richmond	Pommel horse
Pan American Games
Silver medal – second place	1999 Winnipeg	Parallel bars
Silver medal – second place	2007 Rio de Janeiro	All-around
Silver medal – second place	2007 Rio de Janeiro	Parallel bars
Silver medal – second place	2007 Rio de Janeiro	Horizontal bar
Silver medal – second place	2011 Guadalajara	All-around
Silver medal – second place	2011 Guadalajara	Pommel horse
Silver medal – second place	2011 Guadalajara	Parallel bars
Bronze medal – third place	1999 Winnipeg	Pommel horse
Bronze medal – third place	2003 Santo Domingo	Parallel bars
Bronze medal – third place	2015 Toronto	Team
Pan American Championships
Gold medal – first place	2012 Medellín	Parallel bars
Gold medal – first place	2014 Mississauga	Parallel bars
Silver medal – second place	2001 Cancún	Parallel bars
Silver medal – second place	2013 San Juan	Pommel horse
Silver medal – second place	2013 San Juan	Parallel bars
Silver medal – second place	2014 Mississauga	Team
Bronze medal – third place	1997 Medellín	Team
Bronze medal – third place	1997 Medellín	Pommel horse
Bronze medal – third place	1997 Medellín	Parallel bars
Bronze medal – third place	2010 Guadalajara	All-around
Bronze medal – third place	2010 Guadalajara	Parallel bars
Pan American Sports Festival
Gold medal – first place	2014 Guadalajara	Pommel Horse
Silver medal – second place	2014 Guadalajara	Parallel Bars
Central American and Caribbean Games
Gold medal – first place	2006 Cartagena	Parallel bars
Gold medal – first place	2006 Cartagena	Horizontal bar
Gold medal – first place	2010 Mayagüez	All-around
Gold medal – first place	2010 Mayagüez	Rings
Gold medal – first place	2010 Mayagüez	Parallel bars
Gold medal – first place	2010 Mayagüez	Horizontal bar
Silver medal – second place	2014 Veracruz	Team
Bronze medal – third place	2006 Cartagena	All-around
Bronze medal – third place	2006 Cartagena	Pommel horse
Bronze medal – third place	2010 Mayagüez	Team
South American Games
Gold medal – first place	1998 Cuenca	All-around
Gold medal – first place	1998 Cuenca	Parallel bars
Gold medal – first place	2006 Buenos Aires	All-around
Gold medal – first place	2006 Buenos Aires	Parallel bars
Gold medal – first place	2010 Medellín	All-around
Gold medal – first place	2010 Medellín	Pommel horse
Gold medal – first place	2010 Medellín	Parallel bars
Gold medal – first place	2014 Santiago	Team
Gold medal – first place	2014 Santiago	Parallel bars
Silver medal – second place	1998 Cuenca	Floor exercise
Silver medal – second place	1998 Cuenca	Horizontal bar
Silver medal – second place	2006 Buenos Aires	Rings
Silver medal – second place	2010 Medellín	Team
Bronze medal – third place	1998 Cuenca	Pommel horse
Bronze medal – third place	2006 Buenos Aires	Pommel horse
South American Championships
Gold medal – first place	2007 Villavicencio	Team
Gold medal – first place	2007 Villavicencio	All-around
Gold medal – first place	2007 Villavicencio	Pommel horse
Gold medal – first place	2007 Villavicencio	Rings
Gold medal – first place	2009 Sogamoso	Team
Gold medal – first place	2009 Sogamoso	All-around
Gold medal – first place	2009 Sogamoso	Parallel bars
Gold medal – first place	2011 Santiago	Parallel bars
Gold medal – first place	2011 Santiago	Horizontal bar
Gold medal – first place	2013 Santiago	Pommel horse
Gold medal – first place	2015 Cali	Team
Gold medal – first place	2015 Cali	All-around
Gold medal – first place	2015 Cali	Pommel horse
Gold medal – first place	2015 Cali	Parallel bars
Silver medal – second place	2007 Villavicencio	Floor exercise
Silver medal – second place	2007 Villavicencio	Parallel bars
Silver medal – second place	2009 Sogamoso	Pommel horse
Silver medal – second place	2009 Sogamoso	Rings
Silver medal – second place	2011 Santiago	Team
Silver medal – second place	2011 Santiago	All-around
Silver medal – second place	2013 Santiago	Floor exercise
Bronze medal – third place	2013 Santiago	All-around
Bolivarian Games
Gold medal – first place	1997 Arequipa	Parallel bars
Gold medal – first place	1997 Arequipa	Horizontal bar
Gold medal – first place	2001 Ambato	All-around
Gold medal – first place	2001 Ambato	Floor exercise
Gold medal – first place	2001 Ambato	Vault
Gold medal – first place	2005 Armenia-Pereira	All-around
Gold medal – first place	2009 Sucre	Team
Gold medal – first place	2009 Sucre	All-around
Gold medal – first place	2013 Trujillo	Team
Silver medal – second place	1997 Arequipa	Team
Silver medal – second place	2001 Ambato	Team
Silver medal – second place	2001 Ambato	Rings
Silver medal – second place	2001 Ambato	Parallel bars
Silver medal – second place	2005 Armenia-Pereira	Team
Silver medal – second place	2005 Armenia-Pereira	Floor exercise
Silver medal – second place	2005 Armenia-Pereira	Pommel horse
Silver medal – second place	2005 Armenia-Pereira	Vault
Silver medal – second place	2005 Armenia-Pereira	Parallel bars
Silver medal – second place	2009 Sucre	Rings
Silver medal – second place	2013 Trujillo	All-around
Silver medal – second place	2013 Trujillo	Pommel horse
Silver medal – second place	2013 Trujillo	Parallel bars
Silver medal – second place	2013 Trujillo	Horizontal bar
Bronze medal – third place	1997 Arequipa	Pommel horse
Bronze medal – third place	2009 Sucre	Pommel horse
ALBA Games
Gold medal – first place	2009 Havana	Rings
Gold medal – first place	2009 Havana	Parallel bars
Silver medal – second place	2009 Havana	All-around
Silver medal – second place	2009 Havana	Pommel horse
Bronze medal – third place	2009 Havana	Horizontal bar

Jorge Hugo Giraldo López (born 5 September 1979) is a Colombian artistic gymnast. He competed at the 2004 Summer Olympics, 2008 Summer Olympics and 2012 Summer Olympics. He was the first Colombian artistic gymnast to compete at the Olympic Games.
