= Yesenia Ferrera =

Cuban artistic gymnast

- Full name: Yesenia Saskia Ferrera Nuñez
- Born: 16 October 1998 (age 27) Santiago de Cuba
- Height: 1.55 m (5 ft 1 in)

Gymnastics career
- Discipline: Women's artistic gymnastics
- Country represented: Cuba; (2014–2015; 2017–2019)
Medal record
Women's artistic gymnastics
Representing Cuba
Pan American Games
Silver medal – second place	2019 Lima	Vault
Pan American Championships
Silver medal – second place	2014 Mississauga	Vault
Bronze medal – third place	2014 Mississauga	Floor exercise
Central American and Caribbean Games
Gold medal – first place	2014 Veracruz	Floor exercise
Gold medal – first place	2014 Veracruz	Vault
Silver medal – second place	2014 Veracruz	Team
Bronze medal – third place	2014 Veracruz	All-around
Bronze medal – third place	2014 Veracruz	Balance beam
FIG World Cup
Event / 1st / 2nd / 3rd; Apparatus World Cup / 0 / 0 / 1

Yesenia Saskia Ferrera Nuñez (born 16 October 1998) is a Cuban artistic gymnast. She won silver medals on the vault at the 2019 Pan American Games and at the 2014 Pan American Championships. She won five medals at the 2014 Central American and Caribbean Games, including the vault and floor exercise titles.

== Gymnastics career ==
Ferrera won the all-around title at the 2014 Pan American Sports Festival. Additionally, she won gold medals on the vault, uneven bars, and floor exercise, and she also won a bronze medal on the balance beam. She then competed at the 2014 Pan American Championships in Mississauga, Ontario, Canada. She finished fourth in the all-around, and she claimed a silver medal in the vault final and a bronze medal in the floor exercise final. Later that year, she traveled to Veracruz for the Central American and Caribbean Games, where she led the Cuban team to finish second to Mexico. She also won the all-around bronze medal, behind Jessica López and Elsa García. She clinched the vault and floor exercise titles and also won a bronze medal on the balance beam.

Ferrera injured her knee while performing a Rudi vault at the 2015 Anadia World Challenge Cup and placed seventh in the vault final. In the lead up to the 2015 Pan American Games, she was removed from the national team due to "disciplinary reasons". She was brought back onto the national team in 2017.

Ferrera returned to elite competition in 2017 at the Central American Sports Festival in Guatemala City, Guatemala. She won the all-around competition, as well as the vault and floor exercise titles. She also won a bronze medal on the uneven bars and a silver medal with the Cuban team. She competed at the 2017 World Championships on the balance beam and the floor exercise but did not advance into either apparatus final. At the 2017 Mexican Open, she finished second to Cătălina Ponor in the three-event all-around.

Ferrera represented Cuba at the 2019 Pan American Games where the team finished sixth. She advanced into the individual all-around final, where she finished 12th. Then in the vault final, she won the silver medal, behind Canada's Ellie Black. She then won a bronze medal on the vault at the 2019 Cottbus World Cup.

Ferrera retired from competition after the 2019 Cottbus World Cup due to financial difficulties and the Cuban Gymnastics Federation being unable to send her to qualifying events for the 2020 Summer Olympics. She began working as a circus artist in Germany. In 2025, she announced her intention to return to international elite competition.
