= Regulo Carmona =

Venezuelan artistic gymnast

- Full name: Regulo Carmona Moreno
- Born: 31 January 1980 (age 46) El Paraíso, Caracas

Gymnastics career
- Discipline: Men's artistic gymnastics
- Country represented: Venezuela (since 1997)
- Retired: 2015
Medal record
World Cup
Gold medal – first place	2007 Slovenia	Rings
Gold medal – first place	2007 Germany	Rings
Gold medal – first place	2006 Slovenia	Rings
Gold medal – first place	2005 France	Rings
Silver medal – second place	2007 Belgium	Rings
Silver medal – second place	2006 Germany	Rings
Silver medal – second place	2004 Chile	Rings
Bronze medal – third place	2007 Russia	Rings
Bronze medal – third place	2005 Brazil	Rings
World Cup Final
Gold medal – first place	2006 São Paulo	Rings
Pan American Games
Gold medal – first place	2007 Rio de Janeiro	Rings
Silver medal – second place	2003 Santo Domingo	Rings
Pan American Championships
Gold medal – first place	2004 Maracaibo	Rings
Gold medal – first place	2005 Rio de Janeiro	Rings
Gold medal – first place	2008 Rosario	Rings
Gold medal – first place	2010 Guadalajara	Rings
Bronze medal – third place	2001 Cancún	Rings
Central American and Caribbean Games
Gold medal – first place	2006 Cartagena	Rings
Gold medal – first place	2010 Mayagüez	Rings
South American Games
Gold medal – first place	2006 Buenos Aires	Rings
Silver medal – second place	2006 Buenos Aires	Team
Bolivarian Games
Gold medal – first place	2001 Ambato	Team
Gold medal – first place	2001 Ambato	Rings
Gold medal – first place	2005 Armenia-Pereira	Team
Gold medal – first place	2005 Armenia-Pereira	Rings
Gold medal – first place	2009 Sucre	Rings
Silver medal – second place	2009 Sucre	Team
Silver medal – second place	2013 Trujillo	Team
Silver medal – second place	2013 Trujillo	Rings
Bronze medal – third place	2001 Ambato	Vault
ALBA Games
Gold medal – first place	2007 Caracas	Rings
Gold medal – first place	2011 Maracaibo	Rings
Bronze medal – third place	2007 Caracas	Team
Bronze medal – third place	2011 Maracaibo	Team

Regulo Carmona Moreno (born 31 January 1980 in El Paraíso, Caracas) is a retired Venezuelan male artistic gymnast. Five times winner of the World Cup (2006-2007), three times champion of the Central American and Caribbean Games (2002-2010), two times Pan American champion of the discipline (2008-2010). Becoming the best rings gymnast in Latin America of his time. The 2006 and two times in 2007 rings World Cup Champion and at other several international competitions, Regulo has competed for over a decade on the international circuit. Despite his numerous achievements at the World Championships and World Cup, Latinos and other events, Carmona has suffered a string of misfortunes in his career moving him away from the olympic classification. He participated at the 2011 World Artistic Gymnastics Championships in Tokyo, Japan and at other several international competitions.

== Beginnings and career ==
Regulo Carmona was born in Caracas, Venezuela in 1980. He began gymnastics at the age of 7, and when he was 11 years old, he was a member of the Venezuelan national youth team, representing his country in the first international youth Pan American made in Houston Texas in 1998.

Carmona established himself as a top up-and-coming gymnast at the 1998 Junior Pan American made in Houston Texas, where he won gold medal in the rings titles.

== Senior career ==
=== 1998 ===
Carmona began representing Venezuela. He competed at both the 1998 Junior Pan American, where he won a gold medal finish in rings, and the Moncada Cup in Cuba, where he placed 3rd in the rings. He competed in his third International Championships in 1999, where he helped the Venezuela team won 4th place.

=== 1999-2004 ===
After discovering that his passion was gymnastics, he represented Venezuela at the Pan American Games in Winnipeg Canada in 1999, where he finished 4th place per team.

In 2000 Carmona participated in the Moncada Cup held in Cuba obtaining 3rd place.

In 2001 at the age of 21 he participated in the world championship of artistic gymnastics held in Ghent Belgium, finishing 12th place, in which the two-time world champion and Olympic medalist in rings the Bulgarian Yordan Yovchev participated.

In 2002 Carmona competed in the International Cup of artistic gymnastics in Romania he won 3rd place in rings.

In 2003 Carmona competed in the International Cup of artistic gymnastics in Romania, where he placed 2nd in rings where he suffered an index thumb. In 2003 Carmona, after his fracture, competed in rings in the Pan American games in Dominican Republic, obtaining the 2nd place, the silver medal for Venezuela.

That same year, in 2003, Regulo Carmona had a car accident, leaving him with a fractured femur and several reconstructive surgeries on his face, which kept him away from gymnastics for several months while he was rehabilitating, but even without fulfilling the time allocated for, he recovered sufficiently to win his second gold medal in rings at the 2004 competed in the Venezuelan nationals’ games.

In 2004, Carmona closed an impeccable cycle of international competitions, finishing 2nd place in the rings of the world cup in Chile behind the Dutch Yuri van Gelder.

=== 2005-2015 ===
Regulo Carmona participated in multiple international artistic gymnastics events, most of them winning important places in the classification of rings. But luck did not smile on him and unfortunately he could not obtain the desired qualification for the 2008 Beijing Olympics.

In 2005 Carmona participated in the World Cup in France where he won 1st place for rings, the same year he competed in the Copa del Rey celebrated in Spain and the Panamerican Championship where he won the first place for rings in Brazil.

In 2006 Carmona participed in many sporting events, achieving excellent results in rings such as World Cup celebrated in Slovenia where he won a gold medal on the rings the same year he also participed at World Cup celebrated in Germany where he finished 2nd place. In Latin America he participated in the Central American and Caribbean Games and South American Games in both he winning the gold medal in rings.

In 2007 Carmona continues to build his international project in artistic gymnastics and the year 2007 was one of his best years participating in the international cup France where he won second place, he participated in two world cups held in Slovenia and Germany respectively in both won the gold medal. The world cup held in Russia and Belgium had the presence of the little lord of the rings, he won the third and second place respectively. The most significant achievement of his career was the 5th place in the world championship in Germany, making history has been to the first time that a Venezuelan was in the top positions of a world championship.

In 2008 Carmona in that year, he was present in three international events, in the international cup in Spain, where he finished in 5th place. The Pan American championship of the discipline in Argentina where he won the gold medal Gold, closing his participation in the world cup in the Czech Republic, finishing in 5th place.

In 2009 Carmona was champion of the Bolivarian games in Bolivia where he won the gold medal Gold, he also had international activity participating in the world cup in Slovenia, where he won the 3rd place Bronze.

In 2010 Carmona He competed in two Latin American events, each winning the gold medal Gold, the Pan American Championship in Mexico and the Central American Games in Puerto Rico. That same year, Regulo Carmona seals his name in international artistic gymnastics by introducing a new element in the code.
