= Artistic gymnastics at the 2010 Central American and Caribbean Games – Women's vault =

The women's vault competition of the gymnastics events at the 2010 Central American and Caribbean Games was held on July 29 in Hormigueros Gymnastics Pavilion at Porta del Sol, Mayagüez, Puerto Rico.

== Final ==
Rank	Gymnast	D Score	E Score	Pen.	Score 1	D Score	E Score	Pen.	Score 2	Total
1st place, gold medalist(s)	Elsa García (MEX)	5.300	8.600	0.100	13.800	4.800	9.025		13.825	13.812
2nd place, silver medalist(s)	Alexa Moreno (MEX)	5.000	8.625		13.625	5.200	8.550		13.750	13.687
3rd place, bronze medalist(s)	Jessica López (VEN)	5.800	7.775		13.575	5.000	8.750		13.750	13.662
4	Nicolle Vázquez (PUR)	5.300	8.750		14.050	4.800	8.450		13.250	13.650
5	Sidney Sanabria (PUR)	5.000	8.575	0.100	13.475	4.400	8.475	0.100	12.775	13.125
6	Cindy Ruiz (VEN)	5.000	8.300	0.300	13.000	4.600	8.325		12.925	12.962
7	Karina Regidor (CRC)	4.600	8.275		12.875	4.600	8.100		12.700	12.787
8	Yamilet Peña (DOM)	0.000	0.000		0.000	5.300	6.900	0.100	12.100	6.050
Rank	Gymnast	Vault 1				Vault 2				Total

== Qualification ==
Rank	Gymnast	D Score	E Score	Pen.	Score 1	D Score	E Score	Pen.	Score 2	Total	Q
1	Yamilet Peña (DOM)	5.300	8.400	0.100	13.600	5.300	8.500		13.700	13.700	Q
2	Elsa García (MEX)	5.300	8.700		14.000	4.800	8.550		13.350	13.675	Q
3	Jessica López (VEN)	5.000	9.000		14.000	4.400	8.900		13.300	13.650	Q
4	Alexa Moreno (MEX)	5.000	8.450		13.450	5.200	8.300		13.500	13.475	Q
5	Nicolle Vázquez (PUR)	5.300	8.600		13.900	4.800	8.200		13.000	13.450	Q
6	Daniela De León (MEX)	5.000	8.600		13.600	4.400	8.600		13.200	13.400	
7	Sidney Sanabria (PUR)	5.000	8.250		13.250	4.400	8.450		12.850	13.050	Q
8	Yessenia Estrada (MEX)	5.300	7.500		12.800	4.800	8.550	0.100	13.250	13.025	
9	Ana Lago (MEX)	5.000	8.400	0.100	13.300	4.400	8.400	0.100	12.700	13.000	
10	Leysha López (PUR)	4.600	8.100		12.700	5.000	8.300		13.300	13.000	
11	Cindy Ruiz (VEN)	5.000	7.950	0.100	12.850	4.600	8.550		13.150	13.000	Q
12	Karina Regidor (CRC)	4.600	8.500		13.100	4.600	8.300		12.900	13.000	Q
13	Mónica Yool (GUA)	5.000	8.550		13.550	4.400	7.850		12.250	12.900	R
14	Marcela Aparicio (ESA)	4.400	8.250		12.650	4.600	8.450	0.100	12.950	12.800	R
15	Montserrat Armenteros (DOM)	4.600	7.750		12.350	4.400	7.850		12.250	12.300	R
16	Thema Williams (TRI)	4.600	8.500		13.100	4.400	8.650	0.300	12.750	10.925	
Rank	Gymnast	Vault 1				Vault 2				Total	Q
