= Gymnastics at the 2016 Summer Olympics – Women's artistic individual all-around =

Women's artistic individual all-around at the Games of the XXXI Olympiad
- Venue: Arena Olímpica do Rio
- Date: 11 August
- Competitors: 24 from 14 nations
- Winning total: 62.198 points

Medalists
| 1st place, gold medalist(s) | | Simone Biles | United States |
| 2nd place, silver medalist(s) | | Aly Raisman | United States |
| 3rd place, bronze medalist(s) | | Aliya Mustafina | Russia |

The women's artistic individual all-around competition at the 2016 Summer Olympics in Rio de Janeiro was held at the Arena Olímpica do Rio on 11 August.

Simone Biles and Aly Raisman of the United States finished first and second in qualifications and then won the gold and silver medals in the final. It was the fourth consecutive Olympic gold for the U.S. in this event. Defending Olympic individual all-around champion from 2012 and another American, Gabby Douglas, qualified as third place behind her teammates, but due to the strict "2 per country" policy in event finals, she was barred from entering. Biles had won the individual all-around at the last three World Artistic Gymnastics Championships in 2013, 2014, and 2015. Aliya Mustafina of Russia won her second consecutive Olympic individual all-around bronze.

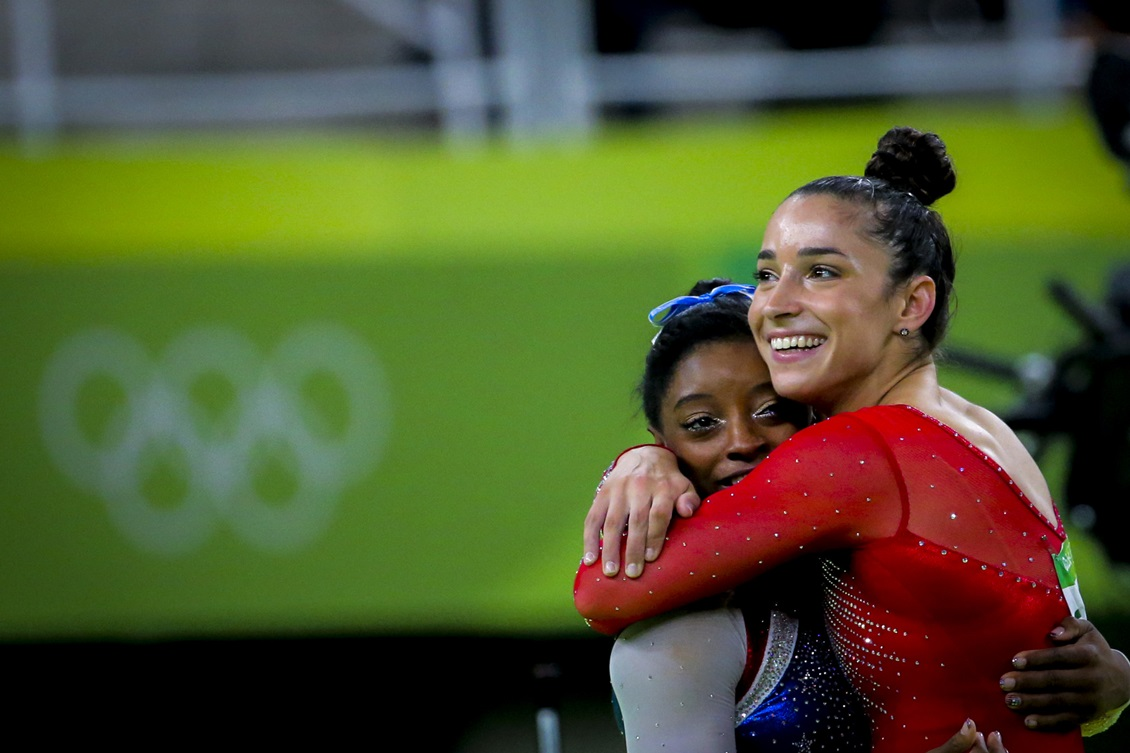
Simone Biles and Aly Raisman hug after the competition

== Competition format ==
The top 24 qualifiers in the qualification phase (limit two per NOC), based on the combined score of each apparatus, advanced to the individual all-around final. The finalists performed on each apparatus again. Qualification scores were then ignored, with only final round scores counting.

== Schedule ==
All times are local (UTC−3)

| Date | Time | Round |
|---|---|---|
| Sunday, 7 August 2016 | 10:30 | Qualification |
| Thursday, 11 August 2016 | 16:00 | Finals |

== Qualification ==
| Rank | Gymnast | Vault (gymnastics) | Uneven bars | Balance beam | Floor (gymnastics) | Total |
|---|---|---|---|---|---|---|
| 1 | Simone Biles (USA) | 16.000 | 15.000 | 15.633 | 15.733 | 62.416 |
| 2 | Aly Raisman (USA) | 15.766 | 14.733 | 14.833 | 15.275 | 60.607 |
| 3 | Rebeca Andrade (BRA) | 15.566 | 14.933 | 14.200 | 14.033 | 58.732 |
| 4 | Seda Tutkhalyan (RUS) | 14.733 | 15.133 | 14.466 | 13.875 | 58.207 |
| 5 | Aliya Mustafina (RUS) | 15.166 | 15.833 | 13.033 | 14.066 | 58.098 |
| 6 | Wang Yan (CHN) | 14.933 | 13.900 | 14.100 | 14.666 | 57.599 |
| 7 | Eythora Thorsdottir (NED) | 14.900 | 14.733 | 14.300 | 13.633 | 57.566 |
| 8 | Mai Murakami (JPN) | 14.700 | 14.166 | 13.833 | 14.566 | 57.265 |
| 9 | Isabela Onyshko (CAN) | 14.000 | 14.733 | 14.533 | 13.966 | 57.232 |
| 10 | Elisabeth Seitz (GER) | 14.100 | 15.466 | 13.866 | 13.666 | 57.098 |
| 11 | Asuka Teramoto (JPN) | 14.800 | 14.900 | 13.666 | 13.700 | 57.066 |
| 12 | Elsabeth Black (CAN) | 14.766 | 14.500 | 13.566 | 14.133 | 56.965 |
| 13 | Jessica López (VEN) | 14.933 | 15.333 | 13.933 | 12.733 | 56.932 |
| 14 | Giulia Steingruber (SUI) | 15.600 | 13.900 | 12.733 | 14.666 | 56.899 |
| 15 | Lieke Wevers (NED) | 13.966 | 14.600 | 14.366 | 13.850 | 56.782 |
| 16 | Marine Brevet (FRA) | 14.133 | 14.333 | 14.166 | 13.933 | 56.565 |
| 17 | Flávia Saraiva (BRA) | 14.633 | 12.733 | 15.133 | 14.033 | 56.532 |
| 18 | Shang Chunsong (CHN) | 12.766 | 15.300 | 14.366 | 14.100 | 56.532 |
| 19 | Nina Derwael (BEL) | 13.900 | 15.133 | 13.966 | 13.533 | 56.532 |
| 20 | Ellie Downie (GBR) | 14.833 | 14.633 | 14.500 | 12.500 | 56.466 |
| 21 | Louise Vanhille (FRA) | 13.966 | 14.866 | 13.633 | 13.300 | 55.765 |
| 22 | Carlotta Ferlito (ITA) | 14.300 | 14.033 | 13.233 | 14.033 | 55.599 |
| 23 | Sophie Scheder (GER) | 13.966 | 15.433 | 12.933 | 13.266 | 55.598 |
| 24 | Vanessa Ferrari (ITA) | 14.533 | 13.866 | 12.000 | 14.866 | 55.265 |

=== Reserves ===
The reserves for the individual all-around event final were

- Claudia Fragapane (GBR)
- Alexa Moreno (MEX)
- Ana Sofía Gómez (GUA)
- Zsófia Kovács (HUN)

Only two gymnasts from each country may advance to the all-around final. Therefore, in some cases, a third gymnast placed high enough to qualify, but did not advance to the final because of the quota. Gymnasts who did not advance to the final, but had high enough scores to do so were:

- Gabby Douglas (USA) (3rd place)
- Aiko Sugihara (JPN) (16th place)
- Angelina Melnikova (RUS) (22nd place)
- Jade Barbosa (BRA) (23rd place)

== Final ==
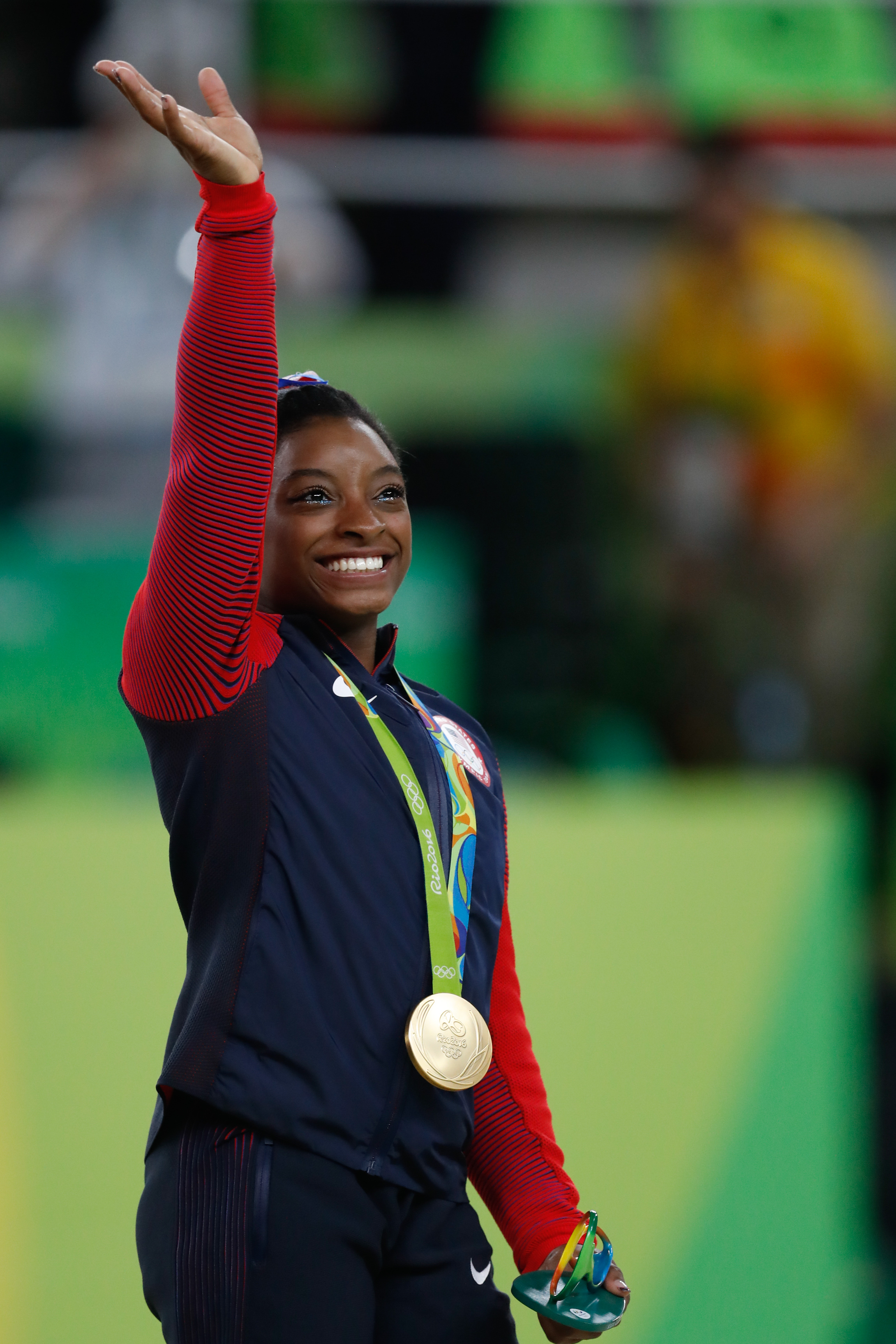
Biles after receiving the gold medal

| Rank | Gymnast | Vault (gymnastics) | Uneven bars | Balance beam | Floor (gymnastics) | Total |
|---|---|---|---|---|---|---|
| 1st place, gold medalist(s) | Simone Biles (USA) | 15.866 (1) | 14.966 (7) | 15.433 (1) | 15.933 (1) | 62.198 |
| 2nd place, silver medalist(s) | Aly Raisman (USA) | 15.633 (2) | 14.166 (=14) | 14.866 (2) | 15.433 (2) | 60.098 |
| 3rd place, bronze medalist(s) | Aliya Mustafina (RUS) | 15.200 (5) | 15.666 (1) | 13.866 (12) | 13.933 (16) | 58.665 |
| 4 | Shang Chunsong (CHN) | 13.883 (23) | 15.233 (=3) | 14.833 (3) | 14.600 (5) | 58.549 |
| 5 | Elsabeth Black (CAN) | 14.866 (=8) | 14.500 (10) | 14.566 (5) | 14.366 (7) | 58.298 |
| 6 | Wang Yan (CHN) | 14.733 (=13) | 13.733 (23) | 14.666 (4) | 14.900 (3) | 58.032 |
| 7 | Jessica López (VEN) | 14.833 (=11) | 15.100 (5) | 13.800 (=13) | 14.233 (9) | 57.966 |
| 8 | Asuka Teramoto (JPN) | 15.100 (=6) | 14.566 (9) | 14.266 (7) | 14.033 (14) | 57.965 |
| 9 | Eythora Thorsdottir (NED) | 14.833 (=11) | 14.200 (13) | 14.066 (9) | 14.533 (6) | 57.632 |
| 10 | Giulia Steingruber (SUI) | 15.366 (4) | 13.800 (20) | 13.666 (18) | 14.733 (4) | 57.565 |
| 11 | Rebeca Andrade (BRA) | 15.566 (3) | 14.033 (=17) | 13.600 (19) | 13.766 (19) | 56.965 |
| 12 | Carlotta Ferlito (ITA) | 14.733 (=13) | 14.100 (16) | 14.000 (10) | 14.125 (12) | 56.958 |
| 13 | Ellie Downie (GBR) | 15.100 (=6) | 13.783 (21) | 13.700 (=16) | 14.300 (8) | 56.883 |
| 14 | Mai Murakami (JPN) | 14.866 (=8) | 13.766 (22) | 13.900 (11) | 14.133 (=10) | 56.665 |
| 15 | Marine Brevet (FRA) | 14.166 (16) | 14.300 (11) | 14.133 (8) | 14.000 (15) | 56.599 |
| 16 | Vanessa Ferrari (ITA) | 14.633 (15) | 14.033 (=17) | 13.800 (=13) | 14.075 (13) | 56.541 |
| 17 | Elisabeth Seitz (GER) | 14.100 (17) | 15.233 (=3) | 13.200 (=21) | 13.833 (18) | 56.366 |
| 18 | Isabela Onyshko (CAN) | 13.933 (22) | 14.166 (=14) | 14.366 (6) | 13.900 (17) | 56.365 |
| 19 | Nina Derwael (BEL) | 13.966 (21) | 15.300 (2) | 13.300 (20) | 13.733 (20) | 56.299 |
| 20 | Lieke Wevers (NED) | 14.066 (18) | 14.600 (8) | 13.066 (23) | 14.133 (=10) | 55.865 |
| 21 | Louise Vanhille (FRA) | 14.000 (20) | 14.233 (12) | 13.200 (=21) | 13.233 (22) | 54.666 |
| 22 | Seda Tutkhalyan (RUS) | 14.866 (=8) | 15.033 (6) | 13.800 (=13) | 10.966 (23) | 54.665 |
| 23 | Sophie Scheder (GER) | 14.033 (19) | 13.950 (19) | 12.666 (24) | 13.258 (21) | 53.907 |
| 24 | Jade Barbosa (BRA) | --^{1} (24) | --^{1} (24) | 13.700 (=16) | 7.500 (24) | DNF |

1. Jade Barbosa was substituted in for Flávia Saraiva by the Brazilian federation, reportedly so that Saraiva could concentrate on preparing for the balance beam final. Barbosa withdrew after an injury on floor exercise.
