= Artistic gymnastics at the 2010 Central American and Caribbean Games =

Artistic gymnastics at the Mayagüez 2010 Central American and Caribbean Games
- Venue: Hormigueros Gymnastics Pavilion
- Location: Hormigueros, Puerto Rico
- Dates: 25–30 July 2010

The artistic gymnastics competition of the Mayagüez 2010 Central American and Caribbean Games was held 25–30 July 2010 at the Hormigueros Gymnastics Pavilion (Spanish: Pabellón de Gimnasia, Hormigueros) in Hormigueros, Puerto Rico.

== Medal summary ==
=== Men's events ===
Event	Gold	Silver	Bronze
Team all-around	Puerto Rico; Rafael Morales; Ángel Ramos; Tommy Ramos; Luis Rivera; Alexander Rodríguez; Luis Vargas	Mexico; Javier Balboa; Daniel Corral; Santiago López; Miguel Monreal; Luis Sosa; Aldo Torres	Colombia; James Bochero; Jossimar Calvo; Jorge Hugo Giraldo; Didier Lugo; Fabián Meza
Individual all-around	Jorge Hugo Giraldo (COL)	Luis Rivera (PUR)	Luis Vargas (PUR)
Floor exercise	Luis Rivera (PUR)	Santiago López (MEX)	Alexander Rodríguez (PUR)
Vault	Luis Rivera (PUR)	Alexander Rodríguez (PUR)	Daniel Corral (MEX)
Parallel bars	Jorge Hugo Giraldo (COL)	Luis Vargas (PUR)	José Fuentes (VEN)
Pommel horse	Luis Rivera (PUR)	Rafael Morales (PUR)	Jorge Hugo Giraldo (COL)
Still rings	Regulo Carmona (VEN); Jorge Hugo Giraldo (COL); Tommy Ramos (PUR)	None awarded	None awarded
Horizontal bar	Jorge Hugo Giraldo (COL)	Luis Vargas (PUR)	José Fuentes (VEN)

=== Women's events ===
Event	Gold	Silver	Bronze
Team all-around	Mexico; Marisela Cantu; Daniela De León; Yessenia Estrada; Elsa García; Ana Lago; Alexa Moreno	Venezuela; Jessica López; Maciel Peña; Ivet Rojas; Cindy Ruiz; Johanny Sotillo	Puerto Rico; Andrea López; Dimarys López; Leysha López; Bibiana Rodríguez; Sidney Sanabria; Nicolle Vázquez
Individual all-around (details)	Jessica López (VEN)	Elsa García (MEX)	Nathalia Sánchez (COL)
Floor exercise	Elsa García (MEX)	Ana Lago (MEX)	Jessica López (VEN); Nicolle Vásquez (PUR)
Vault (details)	Elsa García (MEX)	Alexa Moreno (MEX)	Jessica López (VEN)
Uneven bars	Jessica López (VEN)	Nathalia Sánchez (COL)	Mónica Yool (GUA)
Balance beam	Nathalia Sánchez (COL)	Elsa García (MEX)	Jessica López (VEN)

== See also ==
- Rhythmic gymnastics at the 2010 Central American and Caribbean Games
- Trampoline at the 2010 Central American and Caribbean Games
