= Gymnastics at the 2014 Central American and Caribbean Games =

Gymnastics Competition

- Venue: Veracruz Arena
- Location: Veracruz, Mexico
- Dates: 16–26 November 2014

The gymnastics competition at the 2014 Central American and Caribbean Games was held in Veracruz, Mexico, from 16 to 26 November 2014 at the Veracruz Arena.

== Medal summary ==
=== Artistic gymnastics ===
==== Men's events ====
Event	Gold	Silver	Bronze
Team All-Around	Puerto Rico (PUR); Tommy Ramos; Luis Ramon Rivera; Alexander Rodríguez; Rafael Morales; Alexis Torres	Colombia (COL); Carlos Calvo; Jossimar Calvo; Javier Sandoval; Jorge Hugo Giraldo; Jhonny Muñoz	Cuba (CUB); Manrique Larduet; Randy Lerú; Rafael Rosendi
Individual All-Around	Manrique Larduet (CUB)	Jossimar Calvo (COL)	Luis Ramon Rivera (PUR)
Floor	Jorge Vega (GUA)	Manrique Larduet (CUB)	Luis Ramon Rivera (PUR)
Vault	Manrique Larduet (CUB)	Audrys Nin (DOM)	Jorge Vega (GUA)
Parallel bars	Jossimar Calvo (COL)	Manrique Larduet (CUB)	Daniel Corral (MEX)
Pommel horse	Jhonny Muñoz (COL)	José Luis Fuentes (VEN)	Rafael Morales (PUR)
Rings	Tommy Ramos (PUR)	Manrique Larduet (CUB)	Daniel Corral (MEX)
Horizontal bar	Jossimar Calvo (COL)	Manrique Larduet (CUB)	Audrys Nin (DOM)

==== Women's events ====
Event	Gold	Silver	Bronze
Team All-Around	Mexico (MEX); Karla Retiz; Karla Torres; Alexa Moreno; Ana Lago; Elsa García	Cuba (CUB); Leidys Perdomo; Leidys Rojas; Mary Morffi; Yesenia Ferrera; Dovelis Torres	Colombia (COL); Dayana Ardila; Yurany Avendaño; Catalina Escobar; Rudy Sandovar; Bibiana Vélez
Individual All-Around	Jessica López (VEN)	Elsa García (MEX)	Yesenia Ferrera (CUB)
Floor	Yesenia Ferrera (CUB)	Jessica López (VEN)	Dovelis Torres (CUB)
Vault	Yesenia Ferrera (CUB)	Dovelis Torres (CUB)	Nicolle Vazquez (PUR)
Uneven bars	Jessica López (VEN)	Ana Sofía Gómez (GUA)	Bibiana Vélez (COL)
Balance beam	Jessica López (VEN)	Ana Lago (MEX)	Yesenia Ferrera (CUB)

=== Rhythmic gymnastics ===
Event	Gold	Silver	Bronze
Individual All-Around	Cynthia Valdez (MEX)	Rut Castillo (MEX)	Legna Savon (CUB)
Ball	Rut Castillo (MEX)	Cynthia Valdez (MEX)	Legna Savon (CUB)
Clubs	Cynthia Valdez (MEX)	Karla Diaz (MEX)	Grisbel Lopez (VEN)
Hoop	Rut Castillo (MEX)	Yansy Duquesne (CUB)	Lina Dussan (COL)
Ribbon	Cynthia Valdez (MEX)	Rut Castillo (MEX)	Michelle Sanchez (VEN)

=== Trampoline gymnastics ===
Event	Gold	Silver	Bronze
Men's Individual	José Alberto Vargas (MEX)	Ángel Hernández (COL)	Natanael Camara (PUR)

== Medal table ==
* Host nation (Mexico)

Rank	Nation	Gold	Silver	Bronze	Total
1	Mexico (MEX)*	7	6	2	15
2	Cuba (CUB)	4	7	6	17
3	Colombia (COL)	3	3	3	9
4	Venezuela (VEN)	3	2	2	7
5	Puerto Rico (PUR)	2	0	5	7
6	Guatemala (GUA)	1	1	1	3
7	Dominican Republic (DOM)	0	1	1	2
Totals (7 entries)		20	20	20	60
