= 2015 South American Artistic Gymnastics Championships =

International artistic gymnastics competition

The 2015 South American Artistic Gymnastics Championships were held in Cali, Colombia June 18–22, 2015. The competition was organized by the Colombian Gymnastics Federation and approved by the International Gymnastics Federation. This was the 14th edition of the South American Artistic Gymnastics Championships for senior gymnasts.

== Participating nations ==
- Argentina
- Bolivia
- Brazil
- Colombia
- Chile
- Ecuador
- Panama
- Peru
- Uruguay
- Venezuela

== Medalists ==
Event	Gold	Silver	Bronze
Men
Team all-around	Colombia; Jorge Hugo Giraldo; Jossimar Calvo; Jhonny Muñoz; Carlos Calvo; Andrés Martínez	Brazil; Petrix Barbosa; Leonardo Souza; Pericles Silva; Renato Oliveira; Ângelo Assumpção	Argentina; Daniel Villafañe; Osvaldo Martinez; Mauro Martinez; Nicolas Cordoba; Nicolas Bracco
Individual all-around	Jorge Hugo Giraldo (COL)	Petrix Barbosa (BRA)	Carlos Calvo (COL)
Floor exercise	Ângelo Assumpção (BRA) Andrés Martínez (COL)	None awarded	Renato Oliveira (BRA)
Pommel horse	Jorge Hugo Giraldo (COL)	Jossimar Calvo (COL)	Leonardo Souza (BRA)
Rings	Pericles Silva (BRA)	Daniel Villafañe (ARG)	Petrix Barbosa (BRA)
Vault	Ângelo Assumpção (BRA)	Juan Gonzalez (CHI)	Bastian Salazar (CHI)
Parallel bars	Jorge Hugo Giraldo (COL)	Carlos Calvo (COL)	Leonardo Souza (BRA)
Horizontal bar	Nicolas Cordoba (ARG)	Jhonny Muñoz (COL)	Daniel Gomez (ECU)
Women
Team all-around	Brazil; Daniele Hypólito; Leticia Costa; Lorenna Antunes; Jade Barbosa; Mariana Oliveira	Argentina; Ailen Valente; Merlina Galera; Camila Ambrosio; Paloma Guerrero; Maria Stoffel Colombia; Yurany Avendaño; Ginna Escobar; Marcela Sandoval; Bibiana Vélez; Lizeth Ruiz	None awarded
Individual all-around	Daniele Hypólito (BRA)	Leticia Costa (BRA)	Yurany Avendaño (COL)
Vault	Daniele Hypólito (BRA)	Franchesca Santi (CHI)	Yurany Avendaño (COL)
Uneven bars	Jade Barbosa (BRA)	Ailen Valente (ARG)	Yurany Avendaño (COL)
Balance beam	Daniele Hypólito (BRA)	Marcela Sandoval (COL)	Leticia Costa (BRA)
Floor exercise	Leticia Costa (BRA)	Daniele Hypólito (BRA)	Paloma Guerrero (ARG)

== Medal table ==
Rank	Nation	Gold	Silver	Bronze	Total
1	Brazil (BRA)	9	4	5	18
2	Colombia (COL)	5	5	4	14
3	Argentina (ARG)	1	3	2	6
4	Chile (CHI)	0	2	1	3
5	Ecuador (ECU)	0	0	1	1
Totals (5 entries)		15	14	13	42
