= Yamilet Peña =

Dominican Republic artistic gymnast

- Full name: Yamilet Peña Abreu
- Nickname: Chiqui
- Born: 4 December 1992 (age 33) Santo Domingo, Dominican Republic
- Height: 1.42 m (4 ft 8 in)

Gymnastics career
- Discipline: Women's artistic gymnastics
- Country represented: Dominican Republic; (2001-)
- Head coach: Yoandris Tamayo
- Assistant coach: Jose Gabriel Valerio
- Former coach: Francisco Susana
- Music: La llave de mi corazón from Juan Luis Guerra
Medal record
Women's artistic gymnastics
Representing Dominican Republic
Pan American Games
Silver medal – second place	2015 Toronto	Vault
Pan American Championships
Gold medal – first place	2012 Medellín	Vault
Pan American Sports Festival
Silver medal – second place	2014 Guadalajara	Vault
Central American and Caribbean Games
Gold medal – first place	2018 Barranquilla	Vault
Silver medal – second place	2023 San Salvador	Vault
Bronze medal – third place	2026 Santo Domingo	Team
Bolivarian Games
Gold medal – first place	2017 Santa Marta	Vault
Gold medal – first place	2022 Valledupar	Vault
Silver medal – second place	2017 Santa Marta	Uneven bars
Silver medal – second place	2017 Santa Marta	Floor exercise
Bronze medal – third place	2017 Santa Marta	All-around

Yamilet Peña Abreu (born 4 December 1992 in Santo Domingo) is an elite artistic gymnast from the Dominican Republic who won a gold medal at the 2014 World Challenge Cup and the 2012 Pan American Championship in vault and a bronze medal at the 2012 World Cup. She is known for her execution of the Produnova—a handspring double front on vault. She qualified for the vault finals at the 2012 Summer Olympics and the 2011 and the 2013 World Championships.

Peña won a silver medal in vault during the IV ALBA Games and qualified for the finals in the same apparatus at the 2010 Central American and Caribbean Games and the 2011 Pan American Games. Peña won the women's artistic gymnastics Athlete of the Year by the Dominican Republic Olympic Committee from 2008 to 2013.

== Early and personal life ==
Peña was born on 4 December 1992 in Villa Duarte, Santo Domingo in the Dominican Republic. She is 142 cm (4 ft 8 in) tall and weighs 48 kilograms (106 lb). Her parents are German Peña, a tailor and Angela Abreu, a housewife. She attended Ramón Matías Mella Elementary School and Centro Educativo Marillac High School. Peña studied accounting at Universidad Tecnológica de Santiago for four semesters, after which she announced in August 2012, that she would study for a degree in sport psychology. As of September 2013, she studies in Universidad Iberoamericana a B.S. in Psychology thanks to the scholarship given by ARS Universal.

During a training session in the balance beam in 2009, Peña suffered concussion, which has permanently affected her sense of smell.

== Career ==
=== Early career ===
Peña started to practice gymnastics; at the age of six she joined the Mota-Sarmiento club in the gymnastics pavilion of the Juan Pablo Duarte Olympic Center, where one of the best athletes of this club Wilson Balley also trained. When she was eight she traveled to Cuba, where she won two silver medals in vault—her first international awards. She practiced diving from the age of 12. She was nicknamed "chiqui" because of her smallness.

=== 2004-2010 ===
In mid-2004, Peña and her fellow gymnasts took part in a public petition calling for the ousting of the President of the Gymnastics Federation, Esteban Galvá Galvá. The gymnastics pavilion was kept closed and its condition deteriorated. Galva did not fulfill his promises to the athletes. Peña was undecided whether to practice diving or artistic gymnastics, and was asked to go on loan to the Diving Federation for the 2005 season by coach Francisco Balbuena. With her teammate Ninoska Ortiz, Peña participated in the 20th Central American and Caribbean Games held in Cartagena, Colombia, where she finished eighth in the team competition and 22nd in the all-around; she did not qualify for any event final. At the XIII International Puerto Rico Cup, Peña was 12th on vault in qualifying with 13.600, 25th on uneven bars, 26th on balance beam, 27th on floor exercise, and 26th in the all-around with a 42.700. In the vault finals in the Cuban International tournament, she was placed sixth after sitting her vault.

In 2008, the Dominican Olympic Committee recognized Peña as Athlete of the Year in women's artistic gymnastics for 2007. At the XXV International Gymnastics Tournament of the Americas held in Huelva, Spain, Peña won the gold medal in the all-around, scoring a 47.133, and was placed ahead of Costa Rican Carla Gutiérrez (44.300) and Spaniard Andrea Ortega (36.836). In 2009, Peña was awarded Athlete of the Year by the Association of Santo Domingo (ACD) and separately by the Dominican Olympic Committee.

=== 2010 ===
After training in Miami, Peña participated at the 2010 Central American and Caribbean Games in Mayaguez, Puerto Rico, partnering with Montserrat Armenteros. She was placed 17th in the all-around qualifier and finished 13th in the all-around finals with a score of 45.750. Peña also qualified first to the vault finals with a score of 13.700, but finished last of the eight competitors in the vault finals after failing her first vault attempt—therefore receiving 0.000 for it.

Peña participated at the 2010 Senior Pan American Championships held in Guadalajara, Mexico, and finished with an all-around final ranking of 48th and a score of 44.232. She was placed 16th in the vault qualifier with a score of 13.633, and did not qualify for the final. She did not qualify for the final of any other event, and finished 42nd on uneven bars (11.100), 57th on beam (10.766), and 66th on floor exercise (9.200). For another year, both the Dominican Olympic Committee and the Association of Santo Domingo named Peña Athlete of the Year in women's artistic gymnastics.

=== 2011 ===
In July, Peña competed in the XI Campeonato Internacional Estrellas Gimnas-Ticas, held in Costa Rica, where she won the gold medal in the vault event. She was followed by Puerto Rican Nicole Vázquez and Mexican Ahtziri Sandoval. Peña won the gold medal in vault at the 15th Puerto Rico Cup, held in Mayagüez, Puerto Rico, where she scored 14.350, finishing ahead of Colombian Jessica Gil (14.200) and Puerto Rican Paula Mejias (13.862). She then traveled to Maracaibo, Venezuela, to participate at the IV ALBA Games. Peña won the silver medal in the vault event finishing with a score of 13.800, just behind the Cuban Dovelis Torres (13.863). She was also ranked 11th in the all-around (49.150), eighth on uneven bars (11.825), fifth on beam (12.500) and seventh on floor exercise (11.275).

The National Gymnastics Federation asked the Dominican Republic Ministry of Sports and Olympic Committee to contribute about RD$600,000 (Dominican Pesos)—approximately US$15,789 in August 2011—to pay for the use of a training camp in the United States and for sending a team to the 2011 World Championships. For the first time, Peña participated at the World Gymnastics Championships in Tokyo, qualifying third in the vault event with a score of 14.466 after successfully landing the Produnova—a handspring double front, which had not been performed since 1999. Peña is the second women to have completed this element. However, a failed attempt at a Prudonova that she finished landing on her back in the event final left her finishing last of the eight competitors. Peña ranked 25th in all-around and third in vault (14.087) qualifiers at the 2011 Pan American Games. She finished in 18th place in the all-around final (48.275) and eighth in vault; after sitting down during her first somersault and thus scoring a 0.000; she experienced a bad landing on the second vault and finished last with a score of 6.950. In early 2012, her head coach Francisco Susana stated that because of the crowd and the presence of cameras, Peña had a panic attack after qualifying for the finals. For another year, Peña was named Athlete of the Year by the Dominican Olympic Committee for her performance in women's artistic gymnastics

=== 2012 ===
In February, Peña received the Female Athlete of the Year in Gymnastics award. In March, she received an Athlete of the Year award from the Sports Writers Association of Santo Domingo. In April, Peña publicly complained about earning just RD$3,000—approximately US$78 in April 2012—and being rated D, the lowest class among Dominican Republic athletes, despite having qualified for the Olympics and having won a World Cup medal. In April, Peña finished the qualifying round in first place of the vault event at the 2012 World Cup held in Zibo, People's Republic of China. She scored 14.800 after successfully performing the handspring double front and a 1½ twisting Yurchenko, and finished ahead of Chinese Cheng Fei (14.425) and Mexican Alexa Moreno (14.312). Peña later won the bronze medal after landing the Produnova, scoring 14.125 points after the two rounds. She was chosen as the most popular gymnast in the competition.

After winning the bronze in Zibo, she received sponsorship from Air France and healthcare provider ARS Universal. In May, Peña started training with better equipment in Cancún, Mexico, answering the National Federation's claims for support. In June, she won the gold medal in the vault event at the Pan American Championships held in Medellín, Colombia, scoring 14.500 in the vault qualifier and 14.763 in the finals, ahead of Puerto Rican Paula Mejias (14.038) and Brazilian Adrian Nunes (13.888). Peña scored 11.833 in floor exercise, ranking 14th in the qualifier.

In preparation for the 2012 Summer Olympics in London, Peña worked with her coaches Laura Ramírez and Francisco Susana, and performed her set to the song La llave de mi corazón by the Dominican singer and record producer Juan Luis Guerra. In July 2012, Peña received sponsorship from American cosmetics company Avon and later participated at the final qualifier for the Olympic Games, the Olympic Test Event. She finished 69th in the all-around (46.581), 82nd on floor exercise (11.866), 87th on beam (9.566), 76th on uneven bars (11.516), and ninth on vault qualification (13.099), ranking reserve number 1 for the vault finals. After the competition, the International Federation announced the team and individual qualifiers for the Olympic Games, which included Peña among the 35 individual qualifiers. This made Peña the first Dominican Republic gymnast to qualify for the Summer Olympics since the opening of the National Federation in 1973.

==== London Olympics and aftermath ====
Peña participated in the 2012 Summer Olympics in London as one of the favorite competitors for her execution of the movement with the highest difficulty in the vault apparatus (7.1), she qualified fifth in vault scoring 14.933 with the Produnova and 14.466 with the double twisting yurchenko for a final average score of 14.699. She also scored 12.300, ranking 72nd in floor exercise. In the vault finals, Peña suddenly stopped running in the middle of her first vault attempt. She then restarted the vault and sat down her handspring-double front, earning a 1-point penalty and scoring 14.566. She then landed her second vault with a little step, earning a 14.466, averaging 14.516 and finishing in sixth place. She later said nervousness was not the reason for her failure and that she knew her dreamed-of medal chances were lost before the second attempt. She also said that she wanted to be remembered with the quotation: "The possibility to realize a dream is what makes life interesting".

After arriving home, Peña attracted a lot of media coverage, being interviewed on several television programs, which talked about her courage, her way of living and the poor training conditions where she and 80 other gymnasts practice. Other interviews focussed on the personal sacrifices she made to reach the sixth place at the London Olympics. Peña received congratulations via Twitter for her honorable participation from Margarita Cedeño de Fernández, the Dominican Republic's First Lady and Miguel Vargas, president of the Dominican Revolutionary Party—the country's main opposition party. After the Olympic tournament, Peña said she is still young enough and would perfect the Produnova to compete at the 2016 Summer Olympics. Peña's sponsor ARS Universal named her its public image representative and granted her a scholarship, a high-profile life insurance and a RD$250,000—approximately US$6,500 in August 2012—prize.

Peña was enlisted in the National Police with the rank of corporal and assigned to the sport group, also receiving a scholarship to pay for her college tuition. A group of deputies asked the president to award Peña likewise for her dedication and effort if she won, . During a recognition given by her home village club, Club Calero's president asked for a house for Peña and her family. A campaign on Twitter sparked in the Dominican Republic, claiming a house for Peña and be rewarded like an award-winning medalist. Peña finally received her house keys along with the Olympic judoka María García from the Dominican government. She thanked her supporters for the support she received through the social networks for her house cause.

Peña received recognition from the Naco sport club, which named her as an honorable member. She acted as Laurel carrier during the 2012 ceremony at the Dominican Republic Hall of fame, where judoka Dulce Piña and baseball player Juan Guzmán among others were inducted to the local hall. Peña ended the year receiving with her coach a special recognition from the National Gymnastics Federation during the VII National Gymnastics Future Stars Championship.

=== 2013 ===
During a practice session on a mat which dated back to the 2003 Pan American Games, Peña landed in a hole and injured an ankle. She lost a training week because of the injured tendons in her left ankle, but she restarted her training for the 2013 Artistic Gymnastics World Cup Series in La Roche-sur-Yon, France. In late February, Francisco Susana—Peña's coach for 15 years—said he had received better offers from the U.S. and Mexico and threatened to resign unless he was paid a higher salary.

Peña was one of the candidates for the top sports prize, the Dominican Republic Athlete of the Year, along with Luguelín Santos, Brenda Castillo, Aumi Guerra and the later winner, Félix Sánchez. Peña was elected Athlete of the Year in artistic gymnastics by the Dominican Olympic Committee and the Guild of Sport Writers. She was also one of the finalists of the Diario Libre newspaper award, 2012 Man and Woman of the Year awarded in March and finally won by the consumer protection agency director Altagracia Paulino. Peña performed during the re-inauguration of the East Park Amphitheatre during the national Student's Day.

As promised, Peña's coach resigned in May because his claim for a raise in salary was not given any attention, leaving the entire Dominican National team without training. In May, the Creating Olympic Dreams national program announced its support of Peña and another athletes to help them achieve their sporting and academic goals. Peña later traveled to Puerto Rico to take part in the Pan American Championship in August and a qualifier for the 2014 Central American and Caribbean Games. She was then trained by Francisco Encarnación. Peña scored 13.697 in vault, qualifying for the finals, but with a score of 13.025 she finished eighth.

Peña participated in the 2013 World Artistic Gymnastics Championships held in Antwerp, Belgium, where she finished the qualifying round in seventh place on vault after the 14.900 and 14.466 scores, averaging 14.683—enough to qualify for the vault finals. She ranked 49th in all-around (49.399), 64th on uneven bars (11.933), 80th on beam (11.200) and 88th on floor exercise (11.366). Peña finished her finals participation in seventh place after averaging 13.966 in the vault finals. She then took part in the 2013 Bolivarian Games in Trujillo, Peru. In the tournament, she scored 49.433 and was seventh in the individual all-around ranking after accumulating 13.300 in vault, 11.333 in uneven bars, 12.167 in balance beam and 12.633 in floor exercise. She qualified for three apparatus finals, but she injured her right back thigh during the warm-up for the vault finals and was unable to take part in these finals, the uneven bars and floor exercise.

=== 2014 ===
She participated in the 2014 Pan American Sports Festival, winning the silver medal behind the Cuban Yessenia Ferrera, scoring 14.2375.

After a one-month training camp in the United States, Peña participated in the Medellin World Challenge Cup, qualifying to the finals in uneven bars with 11.700 and vault 13.575. She ranked seventh in the uneven bars final and claimed the gold medal in vault scoring 14.175. The Dominican Republic Gymnastics Federation reacted afterwards, claiming that Peña still does not have an appropriate gym and that she is winning a gold medal by heart.

=== 2015 ===
Peña trained in the United States for a couple of months in 2015 at Excalibur Gymnastics in Virginia Beach, Virginia, where she was coached by Gustavo Moure and José Gabriel Valerio.

=== 2022-23 ===
At the 2022 Bolivarian Games she won the vault competition gold medal. In early 2023, Peña won the reality competition Exatlón: All Stars.
