= 2007 South American Artistic Gymnastics Championships =

International artistic gymnastics competition

The 2007 South American Artistic Gymnastics Championships were held in Villavicencio, Colombia, October 10–14, 2007. The competition was organized by the Colombian Gymnastics Federation.

== Medalists ==
Event	Gold	Silver	Bronze
Men
Team all-around	Colombia; Jorge Hugo Giraldo; Juan Carlos Valcárcel; Fabián Meza; Deyvi Castellanos	Venezuela; Fernando Fuentes; Carlos Carbonell; Ildemaro Muñoz	Argentina; Juan Lompizano; Sebastian Melchiori; Sergio Erbojo; Mario Gorosito
Individual all-around	Jorge Hugo Giraldo (COL)	Fernando Fuentes (VEN)	Juan Lompizano (ARG)
Floor exercise	Ildemaro Muñoz (VEN)	Jorge Hugo Giraldo (COL)	Mario Berrios (PER)
Pommel horse	Jorge Hugo Giraldo (COL)	Fernando Fuentes (VEN)	Fabián Meza (COL)
Rings	Jorge Hugo Giraldo (COL)	Carlos Carbonell (VEN)	Mario Gorosito (ARG)
Vault	Ildemaro Muñoz (VEN)	Fernando Fuentes (VEN)	Mario Berrios (PER)
Parallel bars	Deyvi Castellanos (COL)	Jorge Hugo Giraldo (COL)	Juan Lompizano (ARG) Ildemaro Muñoz (VEN)
Horizontal bar	Juan Lompizano (ARG)	Deyvi Castellanos (COL)	Mario Gorosito (ARG)
Women
Team all-around	Venezuela; Ivet Rojas; Johanny Sotillo	Colombia; Jessica Gil; Bibiana Vélez; Nathalia Sánchez; Gabriela Gómez	Argentina; Eugenia Ficosecco; Noelia Cuadrado; Agostina Fratantueno
Individual all-around	Bibiana Vélez (COL)	Ivet Rojas (VEN)	Johanny Sotillo (VEN)
Vault	Jessica Gil (COL)	Johanny Sotillo (VEN)	Martina Castro (CHI)
Uneven bars	Johanny Sotillo (VEN)	Ivet Rojas (VEN)	Bibiana Vélez (COL)
Balance beam	Johanny Sotillo (VEN)	Melany Cabrera (CHI)	Ivet Rojas (VEN)
Floor exercise	Simona Castro (CHI)	Jessica Gil (COL)	Bibiana Vélez (COL)

== Medal table ==
Rank	Nation	Gold	Silver	Bronze	Total
1	Colombia (COL)	7	5	3	15
2	Venezuela (VEN)	5	8	3	16
3	Chile (CHI)	1	1	1	3
4	Argentina (ARG)	1	0	6	7
5	Peru (PER)	0	0	2	2
Totals (5 entries)		14	14	15	43
