= Nathalia Sánchez =

Colombian artistic gymnast (born 1992)

- Full name: Nathalia Sánchez Cárdenas
- Nickname: Nathy
- Born: 7 June 1992 (age 34) Villavicencio, Colombia

Gymnastics career
- Discipline: Women's artistic gymnastics
- Country represented: Colombia
- Head coach: Andres Llanos Gerardino
Medal record
Women's artistic gymnastics
Representing Colombia
Pan American Championships
Silver medal – second place	2016 Sucre	Uneven bars
South American Games
Bronze medal – third place	2006 Buenos Aires	Team
Bronze medal – third place	2006 Buenos Aires	Balance beam
South American Championships
Silver medal – second place	2016 Lima	Team
Silver medal – second place	2016 Lima	Floor exercise
Bronze medal – third place	2007 Villavicencio	Team
Bronze medal – third place	2016 Lima	Uneven bars
Central American and Caribbean Games
Gold medal – first place	2010 Mayagüez	Balance beam
Silver medal – second place	2006 Cartagena	Balance beam
Silver medal – second place	2010 Mayagüez	Uneven bars
Bronze medal – third place	2010 Mayagüez	All-around
FIG World Cup
Event / 1st / 2nd / 3rd; Apparatus World Cup / 1 / 1 / 0

Nathalia Sánchez Cárdenas (born 7 June 1992) is a Colombian former artistic gymnast who represented Colombia at the 2008 Summer Olympics. She is the 2016 Pan American silver medalist on the uneven bars and the 2010 Central American and Caribbean Games balance beam champion. She became Colombia's first gold medalist in a FIG World Cup event when she won the balance beam at the 2010 Porto World Cup.

== Gymnastics career ==
Sánchez began gymnastics when she was ten years old. She finished fourth with the Colombian team at the 2006 Central American and Caribbean Games, where she also placed fifth in the all-around. At the 2006 South American Games, she won a bronze medal in the team event and also won a bronze medal on the balance beam.

Sánchez finished 11th in the all-around final at the 2007 Pan American Games. At the 2007 World Championships, she placed 58th in the all-around qualifications. As one of the top nine athletes from a country that had not qualified through team placement, she earned a berth to the 2008 Summer Olympics. She then won a team bronze medal at the 2007 South American Championships.

Sánchez became Colombia's first female Olympian in artistic gymnastics at the 2008 Summer Olympics. There, she placed 53rd in the all-around qualifications and did not advance into any of the finals. She also competed at the 2009 World Championships and finished 31st in the all-around qualifications.

At the 2010 Porto World Cup, Sánchez won a gold medal on the balance beam and a silver medal on the uneven bars, behind Jessica López. She was the first gymnast from Colombia to win a gold medal on the FIG World Cup series. She also won the balance beam gold medal at the 2010 Central American and Caribbean Games and won another uneven bars silver medal to López. Additionally, she won the bronze medal in the all-around, behind López and Elsa García. She was Colombia's flag bearer in the opening ceremonies. She then competed at the 2010 World Championships and finished 34th with the Colombian team.

Sánchez had a wrist injury and surgery at the end of 2010, but she competed at the 2011 World Championships against her doctor's recommendation as she was attempting to qualify for the 2012 Summer Olympics. She finished 79th in the all-around qualifications and did not receive an Olympic berth. She then competed at the 2011 Pan American Games where the Colombian team placed fourth.

Sánchez retired from gymnastics after the 2011 Pan American Games and attended university. She returned to competition in 2016 and won the uneven bars title at the Colombian Championships. At the 2016 Pan American Championships, she won a silver medal on the uneven bars. She then won a silver medal in the team event at the 2016 South American Championships. In the event finals, she won a bronze medal on the uneven bars and a silver medal on the floor exercise. After another injury, she retired again in 2017 and became a coach for Panama's national team.
