= Artistic gymnastics at the 2013 Bolivarian Games =

Artistic gymnastics, for the 2013 Bolivarian Games, took place from 19 November to 22 November 2013.

== Medal table ==
Key:

* Host nation (Peru)

Rank	Nation	Gold	Silver	Bronze	Total
1	Colombia (COL)	5	6	1	12
2	Venezuela (VEN)	4	4	6	14
3	Guatemala (GUA)	2	4	1	7
4	Chile (CHI)	1	0	2	3
4	Peru (PER)*	1	0	2	3
6	Dominican Republic (DOM)	1	0	1	2
7	Panama (PAN)	0	0	2	2
Totals (7 entries)		14	14	15	43

== Medal summary ==
=== Men ===
Event	Gold		Silver		Bronze	
Individual all-round	Jossimar Calvo (COL)	90.100	Jorge Hugo Giraldo (COL)	87.000	Adickxon Trejo (VEN)	83.850
Team all-round	Colombia; Carlos Calvo; Jossimar Calvo; Jorge Hugo Giraldo; Carlos Orozco; Jorge Peña; Juan Sánchez	337.450	Venezuela; Carlos Carbonell; Regulo Carmona; Junior Rojo; Adickxon Trejo; Xavier Veloz; José Bustamante	326.600	Chile; Christian Bruno; Maximilian Fingerhuth; Juan González; Felipe Piña; Juan Raffo	313.700
Floor	Jossimar Calvo (COL)	15.033	Jorge Vega (GUA)	14.633	Felipe Piña (CHI)	14.467
Horizontal bar	José Bustamante (VEN)	14.900	Jorge Hugo Giraldo (COL)	14.600	Audrys Nin (DOM)	14.367
Parallel bars	Jossimar Calvo (COL)	15.700	Jorge Hugo Giraldo (COL)	15.433	Adickxon Trejo (VEN)	14.100
Pommel horse	Jossimar Calvo (COL)	15.233	Jorge Hugo Giraldo (COL)	14.700	José Bustamante (VEN); Adickxon Trejo (VEN)	13.967
Rings	Juan Raffo (CHI)	15.633	Regulo Carmona (VEN)	15.300	Jossimar Calvo (COL)	14.933
Vault	Audrys Nin (DOM)	14.800	Jossimar Calvo (COL)	14.733	Jorge Vega (GUA)	14.634

=== Women ===
Event	Gold		Silver		Bronze	
Individual all-round	Jessica López (VEN)	56.867	Ana Sofía Gómez (GUA)	55.533	Ivet Rojas (VEN)	52.500
Team all-round	Venezuela; Ivet Rojas; Maciel Peña; Yarimar Medina; Paola Márquez; Jessica López	207.199	Colombia; Rudy Sandoval; Lizeth Ruiz; Gabriela Gomez; Catalina Escobar; Ginna Escobar	198.231	Peru; Britt Reusche; Sandra Collantes; Mariana Chiarella; Andrea Camino; Paola Bautista; Rebeca Aguilar	188.133
Balance beam	Ana Sofía Gómez (GUA)	14.833	Jessica López (VEN)	14.800	Isabella Amado (PAN)	13.233
Floor	Ana Sofía Gómez (GUA)	13.300	Jessica López (VEN)	13.167	Sandra Collantes (PER)	13.067
Uneven bars	Jessica López (VEN)	14.467	Ana Sofía Gómez (GUA)	13.733	Ivet Rojas (VEN)	13.200
Vault	Sandra Collantes (PER)	14.100	Ana Sofía Gómez (GUA)	13.834	Isabella Amado (PAN)	13.650
