= Gymnastics at the 2013 Summer Universiade – Women's vault =

Women's vault competition in Kazan

The women's vault gymnastics competition at the 2013 Summer Universiade was held on July 10 at the Gymnastics Centre in Kazan.

== Results ==
Rank	Gymnast	D Score	E Score	Pen.	Score 1	D Score	E Score	Pen.	Score 2	Total
1st place, gold medalist(s)	Hong Un Jong (PRK)	6.3	8.975	0.1	15.175	6.4	8.675		15.075	15.125
1st place, gold medalist(s)	Ksenia Afanasyeva (RUS)	6.3	9.150		15.450	5.6	9.200		14.800	15.125
3rd place, bronze medalist(s)	Maria Paseka (RUS)	6.3	9.150		15.450	5.6	8.850		14.450	14.950
4	Elsabeth Black (CAN)	6.2	8.525		14.725	6.0	9.000		15.000	14.862
5	Alexa Moreno (MEX)	6.2	8.675		14.875	6.0	8.575	0.1	14.475	14.675
6	Ri Un Ha (PRK)	5.8	9.100		14.900	6.0	7.775		13.775	14.337
7	Teja Belak (SLO)	5.3	8.775		14.075	5.3	9.075		14.375	14.225
8	Kim Bùi (GER)	5.0	9.000		14.000	5.0	8.825		13.825	13.912
Rank	Gymnast	Vault 1				Vault 2				Total
