= Daniel Corral =

Mexican gymnast (born 1990)

- Full name: Daniel Corral Barrón
- Born: 25 January 1990 (age 36) Ensenada, Mexico
- Height: 172 cm (5 ft 8 in)

Gymnastics career
- Country represented: Mexico
Medal record
Men's gymnastics
Representing Mexico
World Championships
Silver medal – second place	2013 Antwerp	Pommel horse
Summer Universiade
Silver medal – second place	2013 Kazan	Pommel horse
Pan American Games
Gold medal – first place	2011 Guadalajara	Pommel horse
Gold medal – first place	2011 Guadalajara	Parallel bars
Bronze medal – third place	2015 Toronto	Pommel horse
Central American and Caribbean Games
Silver medal – second place	2006 Cartagena	Team
Silver medal – second place	2010 Mayagüez	Team
Bronze medal – third place	2006 Cartagena	Floor exercise
Bronze medal – third place	2010 Mayagüez	Vault
Bronze medal – third place	2014 Veracruz	Rings
Bronze medal – third place	2014 Veracruz	Parallel bars

Daniel Corral Barrón (Note: In this Spanish name, the first or paternal surname is Corral and the second or maternal family name is Barrón.) (born 25 January 1990) is a Mexican gymnast.

== Career ==
Corral participated at the 2010 Central American and Caribbean Games where he won the silver medal at the team competition and the bronze medal at the vault final. He then competed at the 2011 Pan-American Games, where he achieved two gold medals in the pommel horse and parallel bars finals. He qualified for the 2012 Summer Olympics individual all-around competition, where he placed 4th at the 2012 Gymnastics Olympic Test Event. He also achieved the gold medal in the parallel bars final in the same event.

In 2013 at the Artistic Gymnastics World Championships held in Antwerp he participated and qualified in 2nd place to the pommel horse final, where he tied with British gymnast Max Whitlock for the silver medal with a score of 15.633, thereby becoming the first Mexican gymnast to win a medal at the World Championships.

In 2019, although Corral did not qualify for any finals, he earned a qualification spot to the 2020 Summer Olympics in Tokyo.
