= Bibiana Rodríguez =

Mexican politician

Bibiana Rodríguez Montes
- Born: 13 March 1969 (age 57); Querétaro, Mexico
- Status: Rectora de la UTSJR
- Occupations: Política, Maestra.
- Title: Contadora Pública
- Political party: Panama
- Children: Bibiana Rodríguez

Bibiana Rodríguez Montes (born 13 March 1969) is a Mexican politician from the National Action Party. In 2009 she served as Deputy of the LX Legislature of the Mexican Congress representing Querétaro.
