= Alexa Moreno =

Mexican artistic gymnast

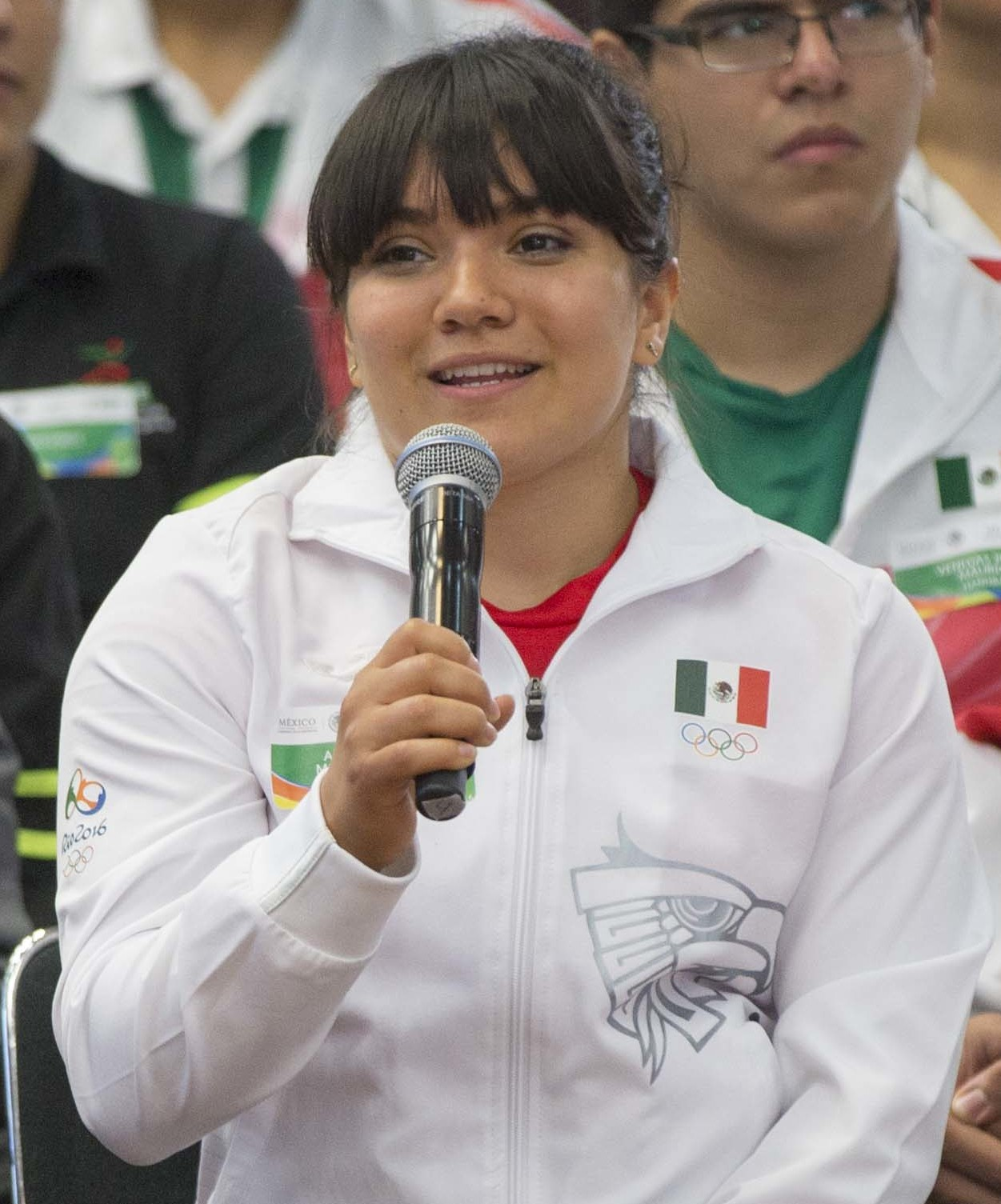
- Moreno in 2016

Personal information
- Full name: Alexa Citlalli Moreno Medina
- Born: 8 August 1994 (age 32) Mexicali, Mexico
- Height: 1.47 m (4 ft 10 in)

Gymnastics career
- Discipline: Women's artistic gymnastics
- Country represented: Mexico
- Head coach: Alfredo Hueto
- Assistant coach: Karla Retiz
Medal record
Women's artistic gymnastics
Representing Mexico
World Championships
Bronze medal – third place	2018 Doha	Vault
Pan American Games
Bronze medal – third place	2011 Guadalajara	Team
Pan American Championships
Gold medal – first place	2023 Medellín	Vault
Silver medal – second place	2023 Medellín	Team
Bronze medal – third place	2014 Mississauga	Team
Bronze medal – third place	2018 Lima	Team
Pacific Rim Championships
Bronze medal – third place	2010 Melbourne	Vault
Central American and Caribbean Games
Gold medal – first place	2010 Mayagüez	Team
Gold medal – first place	2014 Veracruz	Team
Gold medal – first place	2023 San Salvador	Team
Gold medal – first place	2023 San Salvador	Vault
Gold medal – first place	2023 San Salvador	Floor exercise
Silver medal – second place	2010 Mayagüez	Vault
Silver medal – second place	2023 San Salvador	All-around
Bronze medal – third place	2023 San Salvador	Balance beam
FIG World Cup
Event	1st	2nd	3rd
Apparatus World Cup	0	0	1
World Challenge Cup	2	3	1
Total	2	3	2

Alexa Citlalli Moreno Medina (born 8 August 1994) is a Mexican artistic gymnast. She is the 2018 World bronze medalist on vault, the first Mexican female gymnast to medal at the World Artistic Gymnastics Championships. She represented Mexico at the 2016 Summer Olympics where she was the second reserve for the all-around final and at the 2020 Olympics where she placed fourth in the vault final. She represented Mexico at the 2024 Summer Olympics, where she was first reserve for the vault final. She is the 2023 Pan American champion on vault. She won a silver medal on vault at the 2010 Central American and Caribbean Games and a bronze medal on vault at the 2010 Pacific Rim Championships. She is also a seven-time medalist on the FIG World Cup circuit. She is the 2011 Pan American Games and 2014 and 2018 Pan American Championships team bronze medalist and the 2010, 2014, and 2023 Central American and Caribbean Games team gold medalist.

== Career ==
Moreno began gymnastics when she was three years old.

=== 2010—2013: Early senior career ===
Moreno won the bronze medal on the vault at the 2010 Pacific Rim Championships behind Dominique Pegg and Emily Little. Then at the Central American and Caribbean Games, she won the team gold medal and also won the vault silver medal behind teammate Elsa García. The Mexican team finished twenty-first during the qualification round for the 2010 World Championships.

Moreno did not compete at the 2011 Pan American Games due to a meniscus injury the day before the competition began, but she still received the bronze medal the Mexican team won. Then at the World Championships, the Mexican team finished seventeenth in the qualification round, and Moreno qualified for the vault final where she finished seventh.

At the 2012 Zibo World Challenge Cup, Moreno won the silver medal on the vault behind Cheng Fei. Then at the Ghent World Challenge Cup, she won her first FIG World Cup gold medal on the vault.

Moreno finished fourth with the Mexican team at the 2013 Universiade, and she placed fifth in the vault final.

=== 2014—2017: First Olympics ===
Moreno won a bronze medal with the Mexican team at the 2014 Pan American Championships. She also placed sixth in the all-around, seventh in the vault, and fifth in the uneven bars. At the 2014 World Championships in Nanning, China, she helped the Mexican team place fourteenth with qualified the team for the 2015 World Championships. She qualified for the vault final and placed seventh. Then at the Central American and Caribbean Games, she won the gold medal with the Mexican team and also placed ninth in the all-around and eighth in the uneven bars.

Moreno won the bronze medal in the all-around at the 2015 Mexican Championships. She also won the all-around bronze medal at the Olimpiada Nacional. Then at the Anadia World Challenge Cup, she won the silver medal on the vault behind Marcia Videaux. She missed the 2015 Pan American Games due to a broken cheekbone. She returned to competition at the World Championships and finished seventh in the vault final. After the World Championships, she finished seventh in the all-around at the Arthur Gander Memorial. Then at the Swiss Cup, she competed on a mixed-team with Daniel Corral, and they finished eighth.

Moreno qualified for the 2016 Olympic Games at the Olympic Test Event where she finished twenty-second in the all-around. She then won the silver medal on the vault at the Anadia World Challenge Cup behind Marcia Videaux. She represented Mexico at the 2016 Summer Olympics and finished thirty-first in the all-around during the qualification round, making her the second reserve for the all-around final.

Moreno did not compete in 2017 to focus on her studies.

=== 2018—2021: World medalist and second Olympics ===
Moreno won the all-around bronze medal at the 2018 Mexican Championships and won the vault title. Then at the Mexican Trial Meet, she won the silver medal in the all-around behind Frida Esparza. She won the team bronze medal at the Pan American Championships and also placed fourth in the all-around. She won the vault bronze medal at the 2018 World Championships in Doha behind Simone Biles and Shallon Olsen and became the first Mexican female gymnast to win a medal at the World Artistic Gymnastics Championships. She was only the second Mexican gymnast to win a World medal after Daniel Corral won a silver medal on the pommel horse in 2013. After the World Championships, she competed at the Cottbus World Cup and finished fourth on the vault. Additionally, the Mexican team placed nineteenth in the qualification round. She then competed at the Toyota International and won the gold medal on the vault and placed eighth on the floor exercise.

Moreno finished fourth on the vault at the 2019 Melbourne World Cup. She then won the bronze medal on the vault at the Baku World Cup behind Jade Carey and Oksana Chusovitina. She once again placed fourth on the vault at the Doha World Cup. At the Mexican Championships, she won the vault title and placed seventh in the all-around. Then at the Korea Cup, she won the bronze medal on the vault behind Yeo Seo-jeong and Oksana Chusovitina. At the 2019 World Championships in Stuttgart, she finished sixth in the vault final and qualified for the 2020 Olympics with her fortieth-place all-around finish in the qualification round.

Moreno represented Mexico at the 2020 Summer Olympics and became only the second Mexican female gymnast to qualify for a final after Denisse López qualified for the vault final at the 2000 Olympic Games. She finished fourth in the vault final by less than one-tenth behind bronze medalist Yeo Seo-jeong. She announced her retirement after the Olympics.

=== 2023: Comeback ===
In March 2023, Moreno announced her return to training and intent to attend the 2023 Pan American Championships in Medellín, Colombia. She represented Mexico at the 2023 Pan American Championships, where she earned a gold medal on the vault with a score of 13.700. Additionally, she helped the Mexican team win the silver medal behind the United States. She was the female flag bearer for Mexico at the 2023 Central American and Caribbean Games in San Salvador, El Salvador, where she won gold medals with the team and on floor exercise and vault. She also won the silver medal in the all-around and the bronze medal on the balance beam.

At the 2023 Paris World Challenge Cup, Moreno won gold in the vault final as well as bronze in the floor exercise final behind Mélanie de Jesus dos Santos and Jade Barbosa. Then at the World Championships, the Mexican team finished 14th in the qualification round, missing out on a team quota for the 2024 Olympic Games by two positions. However, Moreno secured an individual quota by finishing third all-around among the eligible athletes. She finished 18th in the all-around final and fourth in the vault final. She represented Mexico at the 2023 Pan American Games despite dealing with a knee injury. She only competed on the uneven bars and helped the Mexican team finish fourth.

=== 2024: Road to Third Olympics ===
Moreno competed in two stops of the 2024 FIG Artistic Gymnastics World Cup series. At the Varna World Challenge Cup, she earned a bronze medal on vault with a score of 13.750. At the Koper World Challenge Cup, she earned a gold medal on vault with a score of 13.600.

At the 2024 Olympic Games, Moreno was the first reserve for the vault final.

== Awards ==
In November 2019, Moreno won the Premio Nacional de Deportes 2019 (National Sports Prize 2019) in the "non-professional" category. Also in 2019, she won the Woman of the Year poll in the El Financiero newspaper and was recognized as one of the 100 most powerful women in Mexico by Forbes Mexico magazine.

== Sponsorships ==
Moreno starred in a Toyota commercial during the 2020 Tokyo Olympics, and Toyota is one of her sponsors.

== Personal life ==
During the 2016 Olympics, Moreno was bullied and fat-shamed on social media. In December 2021, she graduated with a degree in architecture from the University of the Valley of Mexico, Mexicali campus. She admires Mexican Taekwondo athlete María Espinoza. She is a k-pop and anime fan and her floor music at the 2020 Olympics is from the anime 'Demon Slayer'.

== Eponymous skill ==
Moreno has one uneven bars release move named after her in the Code of Points.

Apparatus	Name	Description	Difficulty (Note: Valid for the 2025–2028 Code of Points)	Added to Code of Points
Uneven bars	Moreno-Nakamura	Swing forward with ½ turn (180°) and salto forward piked (Note: Also referred to as a piked Deltchev)	D (0.4)	2011 World Championships

== Competitive history ==
Competitive history of Alexa Moreno
Year	Event	Team	AA	VT	UB	BB	FX
2010	Pacific Rim Championships			3rd place, bronze medalist(s)			
2010	Central American and Caribbean Games	1st place, gold medalist(s)		2nd place, silver medalist(s)			
2010	World Championships	21					
2011
2011	Pan American Games	3rd place, bronze medalist(s)					
2011	World Championships	17		7			
2012	Zibo World Challenge Cup			2nd place, silver medalist(s)			
2012	Ghent World Challenge Cup			1st place, gold medalist(s)			
2013	Summer Universiade	4		5			
2014
2014	Pan American Championships	3rd place, bronze medalist(s)	6	7	5		
2014	World Championships	14		7			
2014	Central American and Caribbean Games	1st place, gold medalist(s)	9		8		
2015	Mexican Championships		3rd place, bronze medalist(s)	4	2nd place, silver medalist(s)	3rd place, bronze medalist(s)	3rd place, bronze medalist(s)
2015	Olimpiada Nacional		3rd place, bronze medalist(s)	1st place, gold medalist(s)	1st place, gold medalist(s)	10	2nd place, silver medalist(s)
2015	Anadia World Challenge Cup			2nd place, silver medalist(s)			5
2015	World Championships	21		7			
2015	Arthur Gander Memorial		7				
2015	Swiss Cup	8					
2016	Olympic Test Event		22				
2016	Anadia World Challenge Cup			2nd place, silver medalist(s)			4
2016	Olympic Games		R2				
2018	Mexican Championships		3rd place, bronze medalist(s)	1st place, gold medalist(s)	6	3rd place, bronze medalist(s)	29
2018	Mexican Trial Meet		2nd place, silver medalist(s)	1st place, gold medalist(s)	3rd place, bronze medalist(s)	5	1st place, gold medalist(s)
2018	Pan American Championships	3rd place, bronze medalist(s)	4	5	13	10	8
2018	World Championships	19		3rd place, bronze medalist(s)			
2018	Cottbus World Cup			4			
2018	Toyota International			1st place, gold medalist(s)			8
2019	Melbourne World Cup			4			
2019	Baku World Cup			3rd place, bronze medalist(s)			
2019	Doha World Cup			4			
2019	Mexican Championships		7	1st place, gold medalist(s)	4	19	10
2019	Korea Cup			3rd place, bronze medalist(s)			
2019	World Championships	21	40	6			
2021
2021	Olympic Games			4			
2023
2023	Pan American Championships	2nd place, silver medalist(s)	5	1st place, gold medalist(s)			
2023	Central American & Caribbean Games	1st place, gold medalist(s)	2nd place, silver medalist(s)	1st place, gold medalist(s)		3rd place, bronze medalist(s)	1st place, gold medalist(s)
2023	Paris World Challenge Cup			1st place, gold medalist(s)			3rd place, bronze medalist(s)
2023	World Championships	14	18	4			
2023	Pan American Games	4					
2024	Varna World Challenge Cup			3rd place, bronze medalist(s)			
2024	Koper World Challenge Cup			1st place, gold medalist(s)			
2024	Olympic Games		43	R1			
