= 2001 Bolivarian Games =

XIV Bolivarian Games
- Host city: Ambato, Tungurahua
- Country: Ecuador
- Nations: 6
- Athletes: 2000
- Events: 29 sports + 4 exhib.
- Opening: September 7, 2001
- Closing: September 16, 2001
- Opened by: Roberto Hanze
- Torch lighter: Jefferson Pérez
- Main venue: Estadio Bellavista

The XIV Bolivarian Games (Spanish: Juegos Bolivarianos) were a multi-sport event held between September 7–16, 2001, in Ambato, Ecuador. Some events took place in Guayaquil and in Quito. The Games were organized by the Bolivarian Sports Organization (ODEBO).

The opening ceremony took place on September 7, 2001, at the Estadio Bellavista in Ambato, Ecuador. The Games were officially opened by Ecuadorean Minister for Education, Culture and Sports (Spanish: ministro de Educación, Cultura y Deportes) Roberto Hanze as a delegate for president Gustavo Noboa. Torch lighter was racewalker, olympic gold medalist Jefferson Pérez.

Gold medal winners from Ecuador were published by the Comité Olímpico Ecuatoriano.

== Venues ==
Ambato hosted the following competitions: athletics, basketball, bodybuilding, boxing, chess, climbing (alpinism), football, artistic gymnastics, rhythmic gymnastics, judo, karate, squash, table tennis, taekwondo, tennis, volleyball, weightlifting, wrestling

Guayaquil hosted the following competitions: archery, baseball, beach volleyball, billiards, bowling, canoeing, racquetball, rowing, shooting, softball, surfing, swimming, triathlon, yachting

Quito hosted the following competitions: cycling, equestrian, fencing

== Participation ==
About 2000 athletes from 6 countries were reported to participate:

- Bolivia
- Colombia
- Ecuador
- Panama
- Peru
- Venezuela

== Sports ==
The following 29 sports (+ 4 exhibition) were explicitly mentioned:

- Aquatic sports
  - Swimming
- Archery^{†}
- Athletics
- Baseball
- Basketball
- Billiards
- Bodybuilding^{†}
- Bowling
- Boxing
- Canoeing
- Chess^{†}
- Climbing^{†}
- Cycling
  - Road cycling
  - Track cycling
- Equestrian
- Fencing
- Football^{‡}
- Gymnastics
  - Artistic gymnastics
  - Rhythmic gymnastics
- Judo
- Karate
- Racquetball
- Rowing
- Sailing
- Shooting
- Softball
- Squash
- Surfing^{†}
- Table tennis
- Taekwondo
- Tennis
- Triathlon
- Volleyball
  - Beach volleyball
  - Volleyball
- Weightlifting
- Wrestling

^{†}: Exhibition event.
^{‡}: The competition was reserved to youth representatives (U-17).

== Medal count ==
The medal count for these Games is tabulated below. A slightly different number of medals was published elsewhere. This table is sorted by the number of gold medals earned by each country. The number of silver medals is taken into consideration next, and then the number of bronze medals.

2001 Bolivarian Games Medal Count
Rank	Nation	Gold	Silver	Bronze	Total
1	Venezuela	189	145	80	414
2	Colombia	96	117	117	330
3	Ecuador	46	66	133	245
4	Peru	32	32	46	110
5	Bolivia	13	10	38	61
6	Panama	2	6	13	21
Total		378	376	427	1181
