= 2009 Bolivarian Games =

XVI Bolivarian Games
- Host city: Sucre, Chuquisaca
- Country: Bolivia
- Nations: 6
- Athletes: 2377
- Events: 30 sports
- Opening: November 14, 2009
- Closing: November 26, 2009
- Opened by: Evo Morales
- Athlete's Oath: Lupita Rojas
- Torch lighter: Héctor Medina
- Main venue: Estadio Patria

The XVI Bolivarian Games (Spanish: Juegos Bolivarianos) were a multi-sport event held in 2009 in Sucre, Bolivia. The competitions in Sucre took place from 15–26 November. A number of Bolivian cities hosted some of the sporting events, including Cochabamba, Santa Cruz and Tarija. Also, events were held outside of Bolivia, with Guayaquil, Lima, Quito and Salinas hosting a number of competitions. The Games were organized by the Bolivarian Sports Organization (ODEBO).

The opening ceremony took place on November 14, 2009, at the Estadio Patria in Sucre, Bolivia. The Games were officially opened by Bolivian president Evo Morales. Torch lighter was swimmer Héctor Medina. The athlete's oath was sworn by sprinter Lupita Rojas.

== Deficits in organization and criticism ==
A number of organizational deficits was reported. Initially, the games were scheduled between September 12–24, 2009. On July 1, 2009, the games were postponed to the new date because of "technical problems". The construction works on the sports facilities did not proceed fast enough. The infrastructure was not yet finished even when the games were already officially opened. Some sports like cycling and baseball had to be relocated to secondary venues like Cochabamba at short notice. Other sports like athletics, billiards, fencing, table tennis, taekwondo, or volleyball were experiencing problems because of the lack of equipment. Some sports like roller sports were cancelled completely. Weightlifting competitions had to start already on October 30, 2009, because the world championships would have been contemporaneously else. In equestrianism, the transfer of the horses to Bolivia could not be guaranteed. In shooting, the shotgun competitions (Clay pigeon shooting) were relocated to Lima, Peru, because the equipment and munition did not arrive in time, and they were held until December 6, 2009, ten days after the official closing ceremony of the games. As a consequence, criticism emerged, and restructuring of the games as well as far-reaching reforms were requested to guarantee their future.

== Venues ==
- Sucre, Bolivia, hosted the following competitions: athletics (Estadio Olímpico Patria), basketball (Polideportivo Garcilazo), beach volleyball (Polideportivo Garcilazo), billiards (Salón Club de la Unión), boxing (Coliseo Universitario), BMX racing (Pista de Bicicross del Complejo Deportivo Garcilazo), mountain biking (Circuito Donwhill Sagrado Corazón de Jesús), diving (piscina de la zona de El Rollo),^{†} fencing (Polideportivo Complejo Patria), football (Estadio Patria), futsal (Complejo Deportivo Garcilazo), artistic gymnastics (Coliseo "Max Toledo"), rhythmic gymnastics (Poligimnasio Max Toledo), karate (Estadio Edgar Cojintos), racquetball (Polideportivo Complejo Patria), roller speed skating road,^{†} roller speed skating track,^{†} swimming (piscina de la zona de El Rollo), table tennis (Coliseo Jorge Revilla), taekwondo (Coliseo de Combates Poligimnasio Max Toledo), tennis (Complejo Deportivo La Madona), volleyball (Coliseo Jorge Revilla Aldana), water polo (piscina de la zona de El Rollo), (Note: Event initially scheduled, but cancelled at short notice.) weightlifting (Coliseo Universitario), wrestling (Coliseo Cerrado "Edgar Cojinto")
- Cochabamba, Bolivia: baseball (Estadio de Laguna Alalay), track cycling (Velódromo "Mariscal Santa Cruz"), road cycling, equestrianism (Country Club Cochabamba)
- Santa Cruz de la Sierra, Bolivia: bowling (Bolera: Cosmic Bowling), shooting (Polígono de Villa Victoria "Abraham Telchi")
- Tarija, Bolivia: canoeing (el embalse de San Jacinto), triathlon (Represa de San Jacinto)
- Guayaquil, Ecuador: softball (Estadio Liga del Sur), water skiing (Samborondón Mocoli Island)
- Quito, Ecuador: archery (Estadio de la Universidad Politécnica), squash (Concentración Deportiva de Pichinca)
- Salinas, Ecuador: sailing (Salinas Yacht Club), surfing
- Lima and La Punta, Peru: badminton (Club Regatas), judo (Coliseo de Basquetbol del Club Regatas Lima de Chorrillos), rowing (Yacht Club de la Punta), clay pigeon shooting (Polígono Quiñónez de la Base Aérea de Las Palmas)

== Participation ==
About 2377 athletes from 6 countries were reported to participate:

- Bolivia (493)
- Colombia (520)
- Ecuador (438)
- Panama (94)
- Peru (277)
- Venezuela (555)

== Sports ==
In March 2009, three disciplines were already cancelled because the required minimum number of member federations was not reached, namely women's futsal, artistic roller skating, and waterskiing. Moreover, 91 events in 11 sports were cancelled at short notice, among them completely the diving, water polo, and roller speed skating competitions.

The following 30 sports were explicitly mentioned:

- Aquatic sports
  - Swimming
- Archery
- Athletics
- Baseball
- Basketball
- Billiards
- Bowling
- Boxing
- Canoeing
- Cycling
  - BMX racing
  - Mountain biking
  - Road cycling
  - Track cycling
- Equestrian
- Fencing
- Football
  - Football (Note: The competition was reserved to youth representatives (U-17).)
  - Futsal
- Gymnastics
  - Artistic gymnastics
  - Rhythmic gymnastics
- Judo
- Karate
- Racquetball
- Rowing
- Sailing
- Shooting
- Softball
- Squash
- Surfing
- Table tennis
- Taekwondo
- Tennis
- Triathlon
- Volleyball
  - Beach volleyball
  - Volleyball
- Weightlifting
- Wrestling

== Medal count ==
The medal count for these Games is tabulated below. This table is sorted by the number of gold medals earned by each country. The number of silver medals is taken into consideration next, and then the number of bronze medals.

2009 Bolivarian Games Medal Count
Rank	Nation	Gold	Silver	Bronze	Total
1	Venezuela	200	168	108	476
2	Colombia	143	131	86	360
3	Ecuador	48	80	144	272
4	Peru	36	39	81	131
5	Bolivia	19	25	87	131
6	Panama	1	2	7	11
Total		435	436	511	1382
