= Bibiana Vélez =

Colombian artistic gymnast (born 1983)

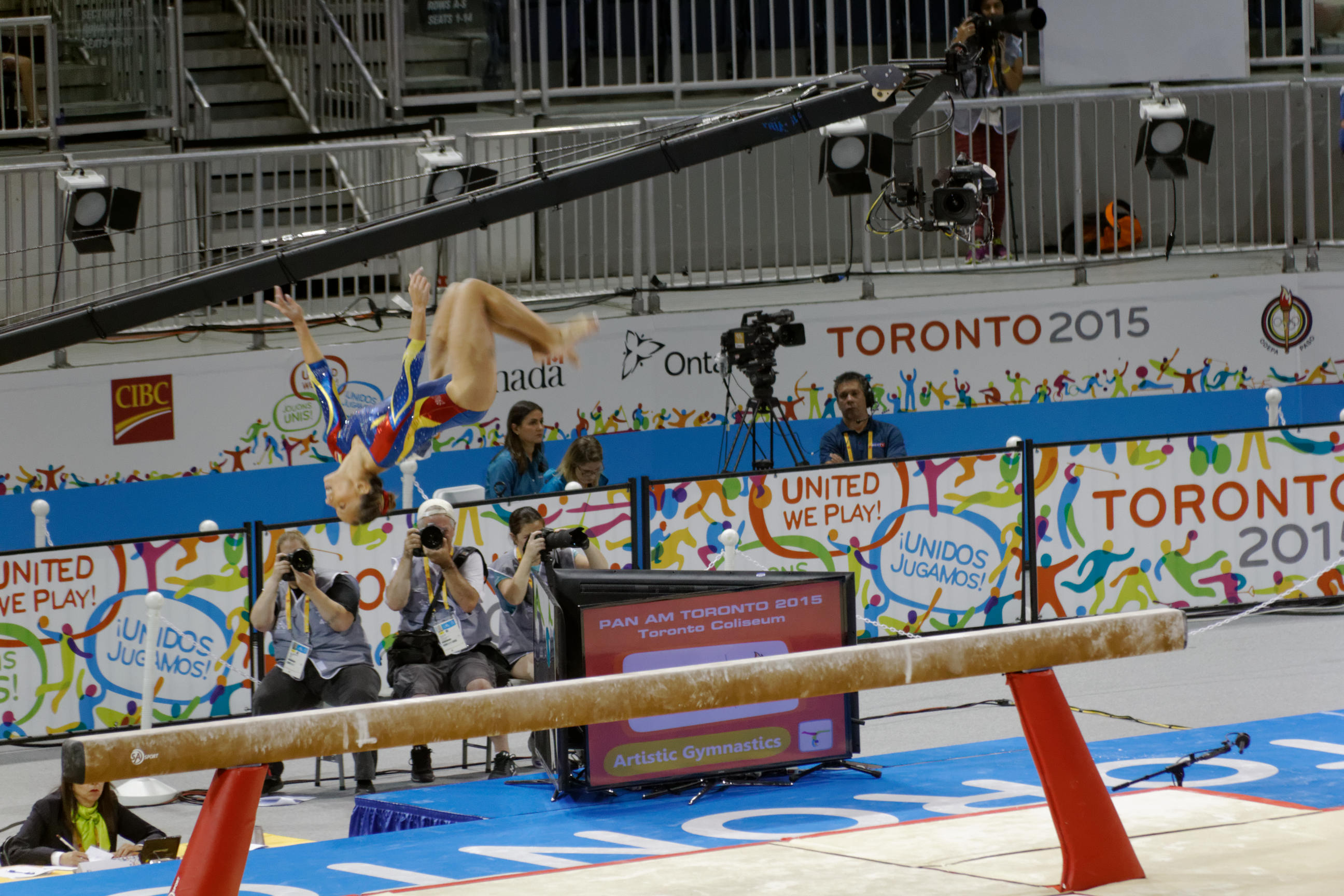
- Vélez competing at the 2015 Pan American Games

Personal information
- Full name: Bibiana Maria Vélez Alzate
- Born: 7 June 1983 (age 43) Medellín, Colombia

Gymnastics career
- Discipline: Women's artistic gymnastics
- Country represented: Colombia (2003–2015)
- Head coach: Diego Medina
Medal record
Pan American Championships
Gold medal – first place	2012 Medellín	Uneven bars
Silver medal – second place	2012 Medellín	Floor exercise
Central American and Caribbean Games
Bronze medal – third place	2014 Veracruz	Team
Bronze medal – third place	2014 Veracruz	Uneven bars
South American Games
Gold medal – first place	2014 Santiago	Uneven Bars
Silver medal – second place	2010 Medellín	Team
Bronze medal – third place	2006 Buenos Aires	Team
Bronze medal – third place	2006 Buenos Aires	Uneven bars
Bronze medal – third place	2014 Santiago	Team
South American Championships
Gold medal – first place	2007 Villavicencio	All-around
Silver medal – second place	2007 Villavicencio	Team
Silver medal – second place	2015 Cali	Team
Bronze medal – third place	2007 Villavicencio	Uneven bars
Bronze medal – third place	2007 Villavicencio	Floor exercise
Bronze medal – third place	2011 Santiago	Uneven bars
Bronze medal – third place	2013 Santiago	Team

Bibiana Maria Vélez Alzate (born 7 June 1983) is a Colombian former artistic gymnast. She is the 2012 Pan American uneven bars champion and floor exercise silver medalist. She won the all-around title at the 2007 South American Championships, and she is the 2014 South American Games uneven bars champion.

== Gymnastics career ==
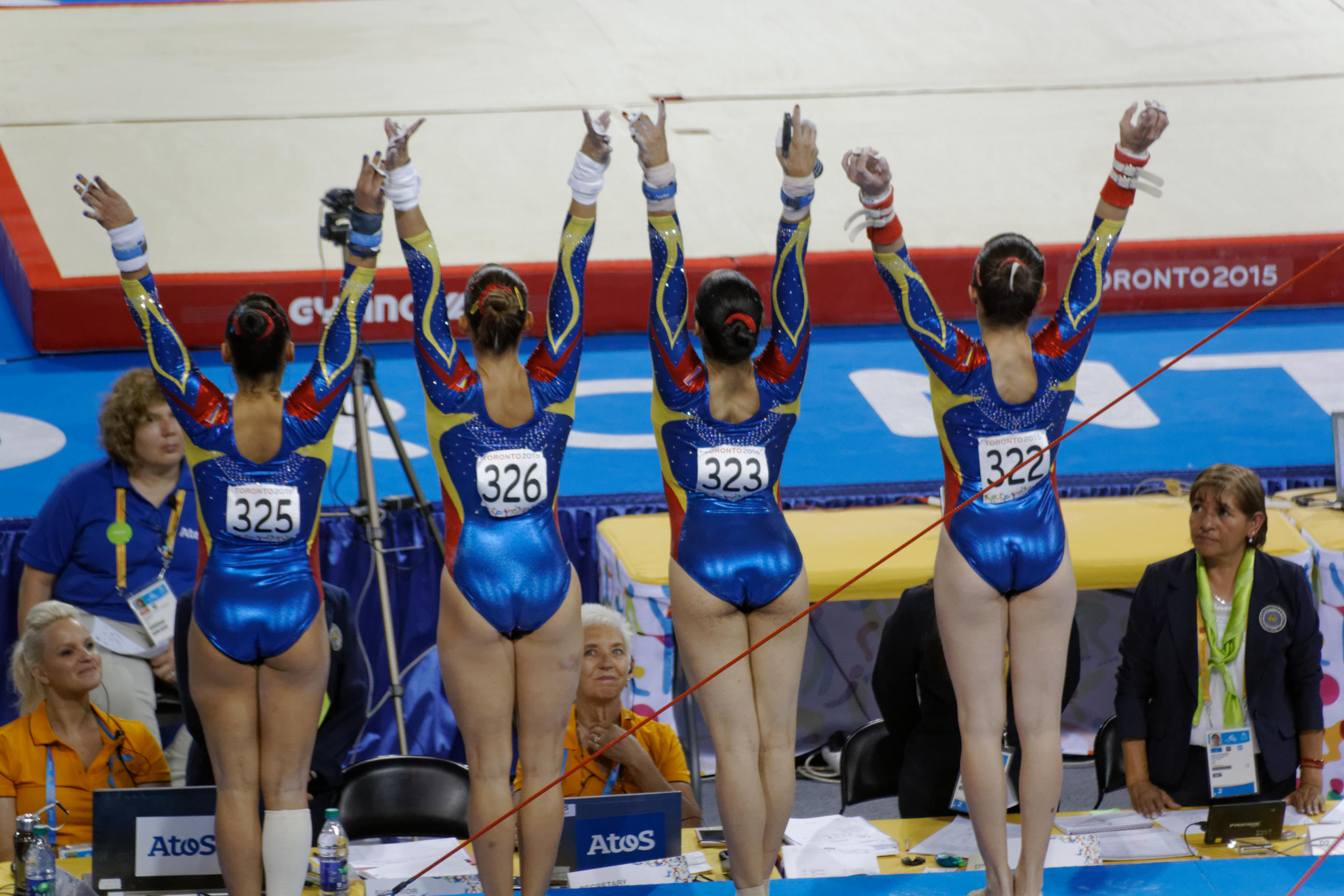
Vélez (second from the left) with the Colombian team at the 2015 Pan American Games

Vélez began gymnastics at the age of three.

Vélez represented Colombia at the 2003 Pan American Games and placed 22nd in the all-around finals. That year, she also competed at her first World Championships, finishing 106th in the all-around qualifications.

Vélez finished fourth with the Colombian team at the 2006 Central American and Caribbean Games, and she placed eighth in the all-around. She then competed at the 2006 World Championships and finished 75th in the all-around qualifications. At the 2006 South American Games, she won a bronze medal in the team event and a bronze medal on the uneven bars. She advanced into the all-around final at the 2007 Pan American Games, finishing 14th. At the 2007 World Championships, she placed 66th in the all-around qualifications. Then at the 2007 South American Championships, she won the individual all-around title and also won a team silver medal and uneven bars and floor exercise bronze medals. She did not compete for two years due to a stress fracture in her tibia.

At the 2010 South American Games, Vélez helped Colombia win the team silver medal, behind Brazil. She tore her ACL in 2010 and missed a year of competition, leading to her considering retirement. She returned to competition and won a bronze medal on the uneven bars at the 2011 South American Championships. She also helped Colombia place fourth at the 2011 Pan American Games. At the 2012 Colombian Championships, she won the all-around title. Then at the 2012 Pan American Championships, she won the uneven bars title, and she tied with Chile's Barbara Achondo for the floor exercise silver medal.

Vélez won a bronze medal in the team event at the 2013 South American Championships. She then won the uneven bars title at the 2014 South American Games. At the 2014 Central American and Caribbean Games, Vélez won a bronze medal with the Colombian team. Additionally, she won a bronze medal on the uneven bars. She won a bronze medal on the uneven bars at the Medellín World Challenge Cup.

Vélez won a silver medal with the Colombian team at the 2015 South American Championships. She then represented Colombia at the 2015 Pan American Games with the team that finished sixth. She stopped competing after 2015.

== Personal life ==
Vélez graduated from the Jaime Isaza Cadavid Colombian Polytechnic and began working as a gymnastics coach while she was still competing.
