= Laura Moreno =

Mexican artistic gymnast (born 1978)

- Born: November 16, 1978 (age 47) Monterrey, Nuevo León

Gymnastics career
- Discipline: Women's artistic gymnastics
- Country represented: Mexico
Medal record
Women's artistic gymnastics
Representing Mexico
Central American and Caribbean Games
Gold medal – first place	2002 San Salvador	Team
Gold medal – first place	2002 San Salvador	Uneven bars
Gold medal – first place	2006 Cartagena	Team
Silver medal – second place	1993 Ponce	Team
Silver medal – second place	2002 San Salvador	Vault
Bronze medal – third place	2002 San Salvador	All around

Laura del Carmen Moreno Garza (born November 16, 1978, in Monterrey, Nuevo León) is a Mexican artistic gymnast.

She represented Mexico at the 2004 Summer Olympics.
