= Marisela Cantú =

Mexican artistic gymnast (born 1990)

- Full name: Marisela Cantú Mata
- Nickname: Chelly
- Born: 25 October 1990 (age 35) Monterrey, Nuevo León, Mexico
- Height: 155 cm (5 ft 1 in)

Gymnastics career
- Discipline: Women's artistic gymnastics
- Country represented: Mexico
Medal record
Pan American Games
Disqualified	2007 Rio de Janeiro	Team
Bronze medal – third place	2011 Guadalajara	Team
Bronze medal – third place	2011 Guadalajara	Uneven bars
Central American and Caribbean Games
Gold medal – first place	2006 Cartagena	Team
Gold medal – first place	2006 Cartagena	Balance beam
Gold medal – first place	2010 Mayagüez	Team
Silver medal – second place	2006 Cartagena	All-around

Marisela Cantú Mata (born 25 October 1990) is a Mexican former artistic gymnast who competed at the 2008 Summer Olympics. She won bronze medals in the team event and on the uneven bars at the 2011 Pan American Games. She is also a two-time Central American and Caribbean Games team champion. After retiring from gymnastics, she won the first season of Exatlón Estados Unidos and went on to host the show.

== Gymnastics career ==
Cantú began competing at the senior international level in 2006 and won a gold medal in the team competition at the 2006 Central American and Caribbean Games. She also won the all-around silver medal, behind teammate Elsa García. She went on to win the gold medal in the balance beam final. She then competed at the 2006 World Championships and placed 53rd in the all-around qualifications. She initially won a bronze medal in the team event at the 2007 Pan American Games, but the medal was stripped because teammate Marisela Arizmendi was registered as a coach rather than an athlete. Individually, Cantú finished eleventh in the all-around and eighth in the floor exercise final.

At the 2007 World Championships, Cantú placed 61st in the all-around qualifications. Although Mexico did not earn a team berth to the 2008 Summer Olympics, Cantú earned an individual spot with her all-around result. There, she placed 11th in the vault qualifications, making her the third reserve for the vault final. She finished 56th in the all-around after several mistakes on the other apparatuses.

Cantú competed at the 2009 World Championships on the uneven bars and balance beam but did not advance into either final. She won a gold medal in the team competition at the 2010 Central American and Caribbean Games. The Mexican team finished twenty-first during the qualification round for the 2010 World Championships with Cantú contributing on all four apparatuses.

Cantú represented Mexico at the 2011 Pan American Games and helped the team win the bronze medal, behind the United States and Canada. She then won the uneven bars bronze medal, behind Americans Bridgette Caquatto and Shawn Johnson. She competed on the uneven bars and the balance beam at the 2011 World Championships, where the Mexican team finished seventeenth in the qualification round. She helped Mexico finish fourth at the 2013 Summer Universiade.

== Post-gymnastics career ==
Cantú retired from gymnastics in 2015 and studied marketing at the Monterrey Institute of Technology and Higher Education.

Cantú participated and won season 1 of Exatlón Estados Unidos as a Team Famous contestant in 2018. After winning the show, she became a co-host.
