= Sidney Sanabria-Robles =

Puerto Rican artistic gymnast

- Full name: Sidney Sanabria-Robles
- Born: February 6, 1992 (age 34) Caguas, Puerto Rico
- Height: 5 ft 2 in (157 cm)

Gymnastics career
- Discipline: Women's artistic gymnastics
- Country represented: Puerto Rico; (2006-2010 (?))
- Club: Orlando Metro
- Head coaches: Jeff Wood; Christi Barineau-Mitchel
Medal record
Women's Artistic Gymnastics
Representing Puerto Rico
Pan American Championships
Bronze medal – third place	2008 Rosario	Vault
Central American and Caribbean Games
Silver medal – second place	2006 Cartagena	Floor Exercise
Bronze medal – third place	2010 Mayagüez	Team

Sidney Sanabria-Robles (born February 6, 1992) is a Puerto Rican female artistic gymnast, who represented her nation at international competitions. She has won medals at international competitions and competed in the 2007 World Artistic Gymnastics Championships. In 2011, when active as a collegiate gymnast, she received a medical hardship for her knee injury that happened before a fall practice and will no longer compete.

== Career ==
Sanabria-Robles won the silver medal on the floor at the 2006 Central American Games in Colombia. She also competed at the 2007 World Artistic Gymnastics Championships and 2007 Pan American Games. In 2008, she won the bronze medal in vault and finished seventh on beam and floor at the 2008 Pan American Championships. She placed fifth on floor and sixth on beam at the 2008 World Cup in Doha, Qatar. With the team she won the 2010 national championships and won the bronze medal at the 2010 Central American Games. She competed at the World Artistic Gymnastics Championships. She was further active as a collegiale gymnast. She participated in sports for LSU and was named to the SEC Freshman Academic Honor Roll in 2011. She opted not to compete because of her knee problem.

== Personal ==
Her parents are Ismael Sanabria Jr. and Dory Jean Robles. She has one younger brother, Ismael. She attended Freedom High School, where she maintained a 4.0 GPA. She plans to major in biological sciences.
