= Jessica López =

Venezuelan artistic gymnast

- Full name: Jessica Brizeida López Arocha
- Nickname: J-Lo
- Born: January 22, 1986 (age 40) Caracas, Venezuela
- Height: 5 ft 1 in (155 cm)
- Spouse: Linas Gaveika

Gymnastics career
- Discipline: Women's artistic gymnastics
- Country represented: Venezuela
- College team: Denver Pioneers
- Club: Futuro
- Head coach: Melissa Kutcher
- Assistant coaches: Nilson Medeiros, Carl Leland
Medal record
Women's Gymnastics
Representing Venezuela
Pan American Games
Silver medal – second place	2015 Toronto	Uneven bars
Pan American Championships
Silver medal – second place	2010 Guadalajara	Uneven bars
Silver medal – second place	2010 Guadalajara	Balance beam
Silver medal – second place	2013 San Juan	Uneven bars
Silver medal – second place	2013 San Juan	Balance beam
Silver medal – second place	2014 Mississauga	All-around
Silver medal – second place	2014 Mississauga	Balance beam
Silver medal – second place	2014 Mississauga	Floor exercise
Bronze medal – third place	2004 Maracaibo	Uneven bars
Bronze medal – third place	2010 Guadalajara	All-around
Central American and Caribbean Games
Gold medal – first place	2010 Mayagüez	All-around
Gold medal – first place	2010 Mayagüez	Uneven bars
Gold medal – first place	2014 Veracruz	All-around
Gold medal – first place	2014 Veracruz	Uneven bars
Gold medal – first place	2014 Veracruz	Balance beam
Silver medal – second place	2010 Mayagüez	Team
Silver medal – second place	2014 Veracruz	Floor exercise
Bronze medal – third place	2010 Mayagüez	Vault
Bronze medal – third place	2010 Mayagüez	Balance beam
Bronze medal – third place	2010 Mayagüez	Floor exercise
South American Games
Gold medal – first place	2010 Medellín	All-around
Gold medal – first place	2010 Medellín	Uneven bars
Gold medal – first place	2010 Medellín	Balance beam
Gold medal – first place	2010 Medellín	Floor exercise
Bronze medal – third place	2010 Medellín	Team

Jessica Brizeida López Arocha (born January 22, 1986) is a Venezuelan artistic gymnast who competes for the Venezuela national team. She competed at the 2008, the 2012 and the 2016 Summer Olympics, where she qualified to the uneven bars final, becoming the first Venezuelan gymnast to qualify for an individual apparatus final, where she placed sixth.

== Career ==
In NCAA gymnastics, Lopez competed for the University of Denver.

She qualified to compete as an individual at the 2008 Olympics in Beijing.

In 2009, she competed at the 2009 World Artistic Gymnastics Championships.

In March 2010, she won the bronze medal at the American Cup. At the end of March, she won the gold medal in the all around, uneven bars, and floor exercise at the South American Games. She won medals in Moscow, Porto, and Ghent, and at the Glasgow World Cup. In September, she went to compete at the Pre-Panamerican Games, where she won two silver medals (uneven bars and balance beam) and one bronze medal (all around). In October, she competed at the 2010 World Championships, where she qualified for the all-around finals and finished in the tenth place, the best showing ever for a Venezuelan gymnast.

Lopez qualified to compete as an individual at the 2012 Summer Olympics in London. She finished 18th in the individual all around final. She carried the Venezuelan flag in the closing ceremony of the Olympic Games.

At the 2014 World Championships, she did not qualify to any individual event finals, but finished eighth in the all around, her highest worlds finish. Afterwards she competed at the Central American and Caribbean Games, placing first all around, beam and bars. She competed at the Stuttgart World Cup a few weeks later and won silver in the all around.

She competed at the 2015 American Cup and placed 4th, which secured her winning the FIG World Cup series.

She qualified to compete at the 2016 Olympics in Rio de Janeiro, where she finished seventh in the all around and sixth on uneven bars.
