= Elsa García (gymnast) =

Mexican artistic gymnast

Elsa Garcia
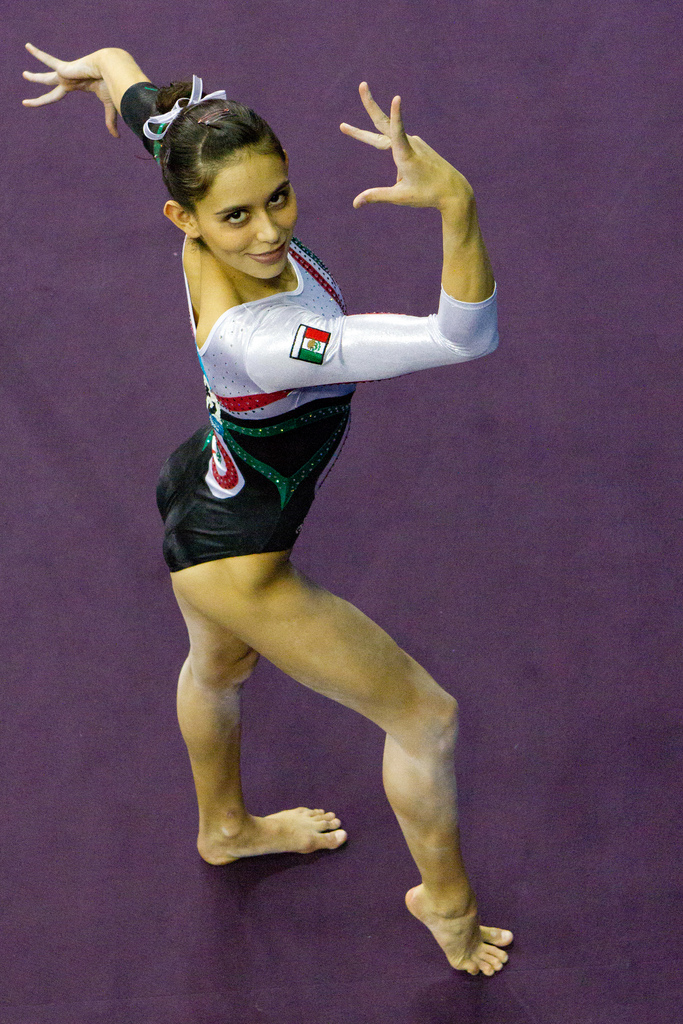
- Garcia in 2012

Personal information
- Full name: Elsa Garcia Rodriguez
- Born: February 8, 1990 (age 36) Monterrey, Nuevo León, Mexico
- Height: 1.65 m (5 ft 5 in)

Gymnastics career
- Discipline: Women's artistic gymnastics
- Country represented: Mexico
- Club: Regio Club Gimnástico
- Head coach: Jose Antonio Martinez Barraza
- Assistant coach: Miguel Ortiz
- Music: Zelda Medley by Lindsey Stirling
Medal record
Representing Mexico
Summer Universiade
Silver medal – second place	2013 Kazan	Floor Exercise
Pan American Games
Silver medal – second place	2011 Guadalajara	Vault
Bronze medal – third place	2011 Guadalajara	Team
Bronze medal – third place	2011 Guadalajara	Uneven Bars
Pan American Championships
Bronze medal – third place	2014 Mississauga	Team
Central American and Caribbean Games
Gold medal – first place	2006 Cartagena	Team
Gold medal – first place	2006 Cartagena	All-Around
Gold medal – first place	2006 Cartagena	Uneven Bars
Gold medal – first place	2006 Cartagena	Floor Exercise
Gold medal – first place	2010 Mayagüez	Team
Gold medal – first place	2010 Mayagüez	Vault
Gold medal – first place	2010 Mayagüez	Floor Exercise
Gold medal – first place	2014 Veracruz	Team
Silver medal – second place	2010 Mayagüez	All-Around
Silver medal – second place	2010 Mayagüez	Balance Beam
Silver medal – second place	2014 Veracruz	All-Around
Bronze medal – third place	2006 Cartagena	Vault

Elsa García Rodriguez (Note: In this Spanish name, the first or paternal surname is García and the second or maternal family name is Rodriguez.) (born February 8, 1990) is a Mexican retired artistic gymnast who represented Mexico at the 2012 Summer Olympics. She was also awarded the Longines Prize for Elegance during the 2009 World Artistic Gymnastic Championships. Having won 35 medals in international competition, she is widely regarded as the greatest female Mexican gymnast of all time. She now coaches in Iceland.

== Senior career ==
=== 2006 ===
In March, Garcia placed fifth at the American Cup in Philadelphia, United States with a score of 57.050.

In April, Garcia competed at the Pacific Rim Championships in Honolulu, United States. She contributed a vault score of 14.650 toward Mexico's team sixth-place finish.

In July, Garcia competed at the 2006 Central American and Caribbean Games in Cartagena, Colombia. She contributed an all around score of 57.250 toward Mexico's team first-place finish. She placed first in the all around final with a score of 58.332. In event finals, she placed third on vault scoring 14.062, first on uneven bars scoring 15.150, and first on floor scoring 14.125.

In October, Garcia competed at the 2006 World Artistic Gymnastics Championships in Aarhus, Denmark. Mexico placed eighteenth and individually she placed thirty third with a score of 56.525. She also was second reserve for the All Around Final.

=== 2007 ===
At the beginning of March, Garcia placed third at the American Cup in Jacksonville, United States with a score of 60.200.

In March, Garcia competed at the Artistic Gymnastics World Cup event in Paris, France. She placed third on vault scoring 14.325, sixth on uneven bars scoring 14.425, and second of floor scoring 15.100.

At the end of March, Garcia competed at the Artistic Gymnastics World Cup event in Cottbus, Germany. She placed third on vault scoring 14.450, first on uneven bars scoring 15.250, and first on floor scoring 15.125.

In May, Garcia competed at the Artistic Gymnastics World Cup event in Ghent, Belgium. She placed second on vault scoring 14.463 and second on floor scoring 14.675.

In July, Garcia competed at the 2007 Pan American Games in Rio de Janeiro, Brazil. She placed seventh in the all around final with a score of 56.200. In event finals, she placed fourth on vault scoring 14.462, fourth on uneven bars scoring 15.050, and fifth on balance beam scoring 14.525.

In September, Garcia competed at the 2007 World Artistic Gymnastics Championships in Stuttgart, Germany. The Mexico placed twentieth and individually she placed seventy fourth in the all around competition with a score of 52.775. Prior to the competition, she injured her Psoas muscle, and based on her performances, she did not qualify for the 2008 Summer Olympics. Garcia said, "2007 was a really special and contradictory year for me, because I achieved so much in the World Cup series and obviously because of my injury that left me out of Beijing."

=== 2008 ===
In June, Garcia competed at the Artistic Gymnastics World Cup event in Barcelona, Spain. She placed fourth on vault scoring 13.438 and third on uneven bars scoring 13.750.

Garcia hoped to earn a wild card spot for the 2008 Summer Olympics but did not. "2008 was kind of frustrating, mainly because I didn't know if I would get the wild card or not. Finally I got an answer to that, and, well, you know all about that." She added, "It was tough to continue knowing that my goal and dream was passing me by. It was hard seeing the competitions on TV in my house, but I wouldn't let myself quit. First of all, because I can't give up on something that fills me with happiness and that I still enjoy very much. Second, I know who I am, and what I am capable of doing if I set my mind to it, so there's nothing like keeping on training and setting new goals to keep myself motivated. Of course, not every day is a great day, but overcoming the hard parts is what makes us realize why we are doing this."

In December, Garcia competed at the Artistic Gymnastics World Cup final in Madrid, Spain. She placed fourth on vault scoring 14.400 and eighth on floor scoring 13.175. Garcia said, "The World Cup Final in Madrid came like a surprise for us, and it helped my coaches and me get the hang of things again, and to reassure me that I want to keep doing this for another four years."

=== 2009 ===
At the beginning of the year. Garcia had surgery on her left hand. She said, "There was an abnormal bone growth due to hard impacts and over-training. So I had surgery, and then had to recover from it and start little by little again. So this year I haven't competed at all. This year is the first year in the Olympic cycle, so we're taking it slow, because next year will be a busy one."

In October, Garcia competed at the 2009 World Artistic Gymnastics Championships in London, United Kingdom. She placed twelfth in the all around final with a score of 54.875 and eighth in the vault final with a score of 13.287. At the World Championships, Garcia was awarded with the Longines Prize for Elegance.

=== 2010 ===
In March, Garcia placed eighth at the American Cup in Worcester, United States with a score of 53.900.

In July, Garcia competed at the 2010 Central American and Caribbean Games in Mayaguez, Puerto Rico. She contributed an all around score of 55.200 toward Mexico's team first-place finish. "Mexico really started well and ended well," Garcia said. "There were great performances from us and other countries, but in the end we got first." She placed second in the all around final with a score of 55.950. In event finals, she placed first on vault scoring 13.812, eighth on uneven bars scoring 11.275, second on balance beam scoring 13.675, and first on floor scoring 14.000. Garcia said, "I think that over the past four years, the technical quality of the gymnasts in this region has improved."

In September, Garcia competed at the Pan American Championships in Guadalajara, Mexico. She placed fourth in the all around competition with a score of 56.232. In event finals, she placed sixth on vault scoring 13.825, seventh on uneven bars scoring 13.300, fourth on balance beam scoring 13.625, and fifth on floor scoring 13.650. "It's a good place, but I know I can improve further," Garcia said. "The objective was met. We are very happy because we were fighting on each apparatus."

In October, Garcia competed at the 2010 World Artistic Gymnastics Championships in Rotterdam, The Netherlands. Mexico placed twenty first and individually she placed fifty first in the all around competition.

In December, Garcia had surgery to remove a Synovial cyst in her left hand.

=== 2011 ===
In February, Garcia resumed training. She said, "After surgery it was immobilized for a month with a splint. I am almost ending my second month that is filled with mobility, rehab and strengthening my hand. So I think I will be recovered completely in April, or maybe May. I am constantly visualizing myself doing the skills I do, and that makes me want to train more and more." Garcia later added, "It was a rough and slow beginning this year because of the operation; but my hand has been fully operational since May, so I've had the chance to slowly regain and really train all the apparatuses and skills. The only times it hurts a bit is when there is a change of climate or when I do lots of vaults, but nothing serious. After my hand operation, it took me a lot of out-of-the-gym training to regain all of my body strength. I did a lot of cardiovascular training and weight lifting, and went back to the basics in gymnastics. The skills I do were in my mind, and my body knew how to do them. I just had to regain control of my body."

In October, Garcia competed at the 2011 World Artistic Gymnastics Championships in Tokyo, Japan. Mexico placed seventeenth and individually she placed sixty third in the all around competition. Before the competition she said, "I can surely say that I am really excited about this year's world championships. I hope that we Mexicans show the world what we are capable of achieving, I think we can place in the top 18."

Later in October, Garcia competed at the 2011 Pan American Games in Guadalajara, Mexico. She contributed an all around score of 52.875 towards Mexico's team third-place finish and she placed fifth in the all around final with a score of 54.425. In event finals, she placed second on vault scoring 14.312, third on uneven bars scoring 13.625, and fifth on floor scoring 13.400.

=== 2012 ===
In January, Garcia competed at the London Prepares series in London, United Kingdom. She placed seventeenth in the all around competition with a score of 54.631. She injured her knee during warm-ups for the vault final. She said, "It was a hyperextension of the ligaments around the knee and connection between the bones, because as my knee went backward my bones crashed into each other. No surgery was needed, but I used a knee cast for a while and then pure rehab, slowly regaining mobility and strength."

In May, Garcia competed at the Mexican Championships. "My performance was exactly as planned," she said. "It was the first competition after my injury so it was to get back in competition form but without doing very difficult skills — letting myself know that I was back in the game. (I did) only bars and beam with full difficulty skills, vault all I did were Yurchenko layouts and on floor I did my first two passes with my coach spotting me, and the rest were very simple tumbling passes."

In June, Garcia won the all around competition at Mexico's National Olympiad with a score of 56.300. In event finals, she placed third on vault scoring 13.762, third on uneven bars scoring 13.075, first on balance beam scoring 14.200, and second on floor scoring 14.600. "I recently competed at our country's National Olympiad doing four full routines packed with almost every difficulty I will be showing in London," she said. "Hopefully just missing an upgrade to a double-twisting Yurchenko on vault and a Patterson dismount on beam."

==== London Olympics ====
She was the only Mexico WAG gymnast to compete at the 2012 Summer Olympics in London, United Kingdom. She injured her hands one day before qualifications and was only able to compete on two events. She scored 12.400 on balance beam, competing a roundoff Patterson dismount and 13.733 on floor. The music she used on her floor exercise was a fragment of the Zelda Medley by Lindsey Stirling, causing her to receive attention from fans of the games series. Her sister suggested the song.

=== 2013 ===
In February, she began releasing her own line of leotards. She had started designing leotards in 2000.

In July, she competed at the 2013 Summer Universiade in Kazan, Russia. She won a silver medal on the floor exercise final, tied with Ellie Black, behind winner Ksenia Afanasyeva.

=== 2014 ===
After missing out most of the season, Garcia returned to international competition at the Pan American Senior Championships in August, winning bronze with her team and placing eleventh in the all-around.

She then was part of the team at the 2014 World Artistic Gymnastics Championships in Nanning, China. She helped Mexico to achieve one of their best world championships placements at 14th place. Her teammate Alexa Moreno qualified to the vault final and finished 7th, while Garcia reached the all-around final for the first time since 2009 and placed 23rd.

She also competed at the Central American and Caribbean Games in Veracruz, Mexico. During the games, she won gold with the team and silver in the all-around behind Jessica Lopez of Venezuela.

=== 2015 ===
Garcia started off the season by sweeping all five gold medals at the Mexican National Championships in April. In May, she competed at the São Paulo World Cup and finished in 4th place in the bars final after scoring 14.525.

In July, she competed at the Pan American Games in Toronto, Canada. She contributed to Mexico's fifth-place finish in the team final and individually placed fourth on uneven bars.

She was part of the Mexican women's national team attending 2015 World Championships. However, she sustained serious injuries in both knees while doing vault during podium training and withdrew from competition. She spent several weeks wearing a brace and working on conditioning so she could resume training.

=== 2018 ===
Garcia underwent surgery on her back in February and spent the year recovering.

=== 2019 ===
In January, Garcia resumed training. Bursitis in her hip and an injury to her Achilles tendon prevented her from competed at the 2019 Pan American Games in June. However, in September, she competed at the World Challenge Cup in Guimarães, Portugal. There she placed second in bars with a score of 13.050 behind teammate Frida Esparza.

She was part of the team competing at the 2019 World Championships in October, but she was not able to compete for a berth at the 2020 Summer Olympics because officials entered her for only three apparatuses, and the Olympic quota required competing in the all-around. In November, she submitted a complaint to the Gymnastics Ethics Foundation alleging that two new coaches hired by the Mexican Gymnastics Federation in March had mistreated her. In 2024, the Gymnastics Ethics Foundation found that the two coaches were controlling, verbally abusive, and required gymnasts to train excessively, even when they had been injured as Garcia was. Both coaches were suspended for one year, and the Mexican Gymnastics Federation was fined.

=== 2020 ===
Due to the COVID-19 pandemic, Garcia trained from home like many other athletes. In September, she caught COVID-19 and spent three weeks in isolation. She returned to training after a medical examination confirmed she was in good health.

=== 2021 ===
Garcia was injured during national qualifiers and did not have a chance to qualify for the delayed 2020 Summer Olympics. Instead, she acted as an analyst and commentator for Claro Sports. In September, she married.

=== 2022 ===
Garcia took the year off from gymnastics. She join the International Gymnastics Federation's safeguarding group; as a member, she was part of an athlete safeguarding webinar and helped spread information on the Gymnastics Ethics Foundation and other information on safeguarding. She also launched a sportswear brand and participated in Exatlón Estados Unidos.

=== 2023 ===
García divorced her husband. She announced her return to competitive gymnastics on March 15, 2023, via a post on her social media platforms and competed in a state competition in March.

== Post-competitive career ==
In 2024, García was offered a two-week trial for a coaching job in Iceland. She enjoyed the atmosphere there and took the job. She traveled to commentate at the 2024 Summer Olympics in Paris, then returned to Iceland to begin coaching.
