= Gymnastics at the 2015 Pan American Games – Men's artistic individual all-around =

Men's artistic individual all-around at the 2015 Pan American Games
- Venue: Toronto Coliseum
- Dates: July 13
- Competitors: 56
- Winning score: 89.650

Medalists
Gold medal	Samuel Mikulak	United States
Silver medal	Manrique Larduet	Cuba
Bronze medal	Jossimar Calvo	Colombia

The men's artistic individual all-around gymnastic event at the 2015 Pan American Games was held on July 13 at the Toronto Coliseum.

== Schedule ==
All times are Eastern Standard Time (UTC-3).

Date	Time	Round
July 11, 2015	14:30	Qualification
July 11, 2015	19:30	Qualification
July 13, 2015	12:45	Final

== Results ==
=== Qualification ===
Osvaldo Martinez of Argentina finished in 16th but did not progress to the final due to the fact that his teammates, Nicolas Cordoba and Federico Molinari qualified ahead of him.

Position	Gymnast	Floor (gymnastics)	Pommel horse	Rings (gymnastics)	Vault (gymnastics)	Parallel bars	Horizontal bar	Total	Notes
1	Manrique Larduet (CUB)	15.150	13.850	15.400	15.200	15.60	15.050	90.250	Q
2	Samuel Mikulak (USA)	15.000	14.850	14.750	14.600	15.500	15.100	89.850	Q
3	Jossimar Calvo (COL)	13.850	14.450	14.700	14.600	15.700	15.450	88.750	Q
4	Donnell Whittenburg (USA)	14.900	14.150	15.450	14.900	14.900	13.400	87.700	Q
5	Caio Souza (BRA)	13.650	13.750	14.600	15.200	15.450	14.500	87.200	Q
6	Daniel Corral (MEX)	14.300	15.200	14.950	13.700	15.000	13.400	86.550	Q
7	Lucas Bitencourt (BRA)	12.650	14.300	14.650	15.050	13.900	14.700	85.250	Q
8	René Cournoyer (CAN)	13.300	14.550	14.200	14.350	14.200	14.050	84.650	Q
9	Randy Leru (CUB)	13.000	12.350	14.300	14.800	14.500	14.900	83.850	Q
10	Hugh Smith (CAN)	13.600	14.150	14.350	14.800	14.150	11.800	82.850	Q
11	Angel Ramos (PUR)	14.050	11.650	13.450	14.300	13.850	14.600	81.900	Q
12	Javier Cervantes (MEX)	12.450	12.650	14.200	14.750	13.850	13.550	81.450	Q
13	Christian Bruno (CHI)	13.700	12.150	13.750	14.550	13.050	13.850	81.050	Q
14	Nicolas Cordoba (ARG)	13.800	12.950	12.950	13.450	13.550	14.100	80.800	Q
15	Federico Molinari (ARG)	13.500	11.100	15.150	14.350	13.200	12.800	80.100	Q
16	Osvaldo Martinez (ARG)	13.450	11.650	12.500	13.550	14.550	13.850	79.550	
17	Jostyn Fuenmayor (VEN)	12.500	12.250	13.900	13.950	13.850	12.500	78.950	Q
18	Jorge Vega Lopez (GUA)	14.850	10.850	13.300	14.400	13.150	12.250	78.800	Q
19	Daniel Gomez Barreno (ECU)	11.500	12.100	12.700	14.050	13.900	14.300	78.550	Q
20	Joel Alvarez (CHI)	13.650	9.450	13.500	13.550	13.700	13.700	77.550	Q
21	Junior Rojo Mendoza (VEN)	11.600	11.850	12.350	13.900	14.050	13.650	77.400	Q
22	Tarik Soto Byfield (CRC)	12.700	12.900	12.800	14.600	12.000	11.700	76.700	Q
23	Daniel Aguero Barrera (PER)	14.200	12.350	10.900	13.750	12.500	11.850	75.550	Q
24	Cristhian Meneses (URU)	12.850	10.350	12.950	13.900	12.700	11.250	74.000	Q
25	Mauricio Gallegos (PER)	11.550	13.450	12.600	13.650	10.550	11.700	73.500	Q
26	Kevin Lytwyn (CAN)	14.500		14.950	13.700	14.650	15.300	73.100	
27	Arthur Mariano (BRA)	14.250	14.300		15.100	14.350	15.000	73.000	
28	Pablo Velasquez (ESA)	12.200	12.300	12.300	12.900	11.350	10.850	71.900	R
29	Jorge Giraldo Lopez (COL)		14.600	14.250	13.100	15.300	14.400	71.650	
30	Jhonny Munoz Perez (COL)	13.150	13.900		13.500	14.550	14.000	69.100	
31	Tristian Perez (PUR)	13.900	12.350		14.650	13.250	14.150	68.300	
32	Marco Riveros (BOL)	11.400	10.050	10.500	12.650	12.400	11.150	68.150	R
33	Kevin Espinosa (PAN)	12.500	11.750	9.300	12.650	11.350	10.550	68.100	R
34	Jose Fuentes (VEN)		14.200	13.150	12.800	14.100	12.150	66.400	
35	Alexis Torres (PUR)		10.550	15.050	13.950	12.800	12.750	65.100	
36	Sandro Perez (CUB)	12.800		12.950	14.400	13.550	11.400	65.100	
37	Carlos Calvo Agudelo (COL)	10.500	14.250	13.300		13.650	13.350	65.050	
38	Rodolfo Bonilla Ruiz (MEX)	12.850	9.850		13.200	14.000	12.550	62.450	
39	Paul Ruggeri (USA)	14.750			14.900	13.750	15.400	58.800	
40	Francisco Junior (BRA)		14.450	14.350		14.750	14.150	57.700	
41	Marvin Kimble (USA)		15.050	13.050		14.500	14.450	57.050	
42	Kevin Cerda Gastelum (MEX)	14.450		13.550	14.350		14.650	57.000	
43	Steven Legendre (USA)	13.750	13.200	14.550	14.550			56.050	
44	Rafael Rosendi (CUB)		10.950	14.300		14.250	14.600	54.100	
45	Rafael Morales Casado (PUR)	14.100	11.850	13.600	14.150			53.700	
46	Arthur Zanetti (BRA)	13.900		15.800	14.750			44.450	
47	Scott Morgan (CAN)	14.050		14.950	14.950			43.950	
48	Didier Lugo Sichaca (COL)	13.100		15.000	14.450			42.550	
49	Audrys Nin Reyes (DOM)	13.100			13.800		14.650	41.550	
50	Tommy Ramos Nin (PUR)			15.400		13.000	13.050	41.450	
51	Ken Ikeda (CAN)		12.950			14.200	13.800	40.950	
52	Javier Balboa Gonzalez (MEX)		12.100	14.750		14.000		40.850	
53	Bastian Salazar (CHI)			12.700	14.750			27.450	
54	Juan Pablo Gonzalez (CHI)				14.150		12.350	26.500	
55	Alberto Leyva (CUB)	0.000	10.650		15.250			25.900	
56	William Albert (TTO)			13.050				13.050	

Qualification Legend: Q = Qualified to apparatus final; R = Qualified to apparatus final as reserve

=== Final ===
Position	Gymnast	Floor (gymnastics)	Pommel horse	Rings (gymnastics)	Vault (gymnastics)	Parallel bars	Horizontal bar	Total	Notes
1st place, gold medalist(s)	Samuel Mikulak (USA)	14.850	14.250	15.000	14.950	15.800	14.800	89.650	
2nd place, silver medalist(s)	Manrique Larduet (CUB)	14.500	13.450	15.400	15.350	15.750	15.150	89.600	
3rd place, bronze medalist(s)	Jossimar Calvo (COL)	14.450	14.100	14.700	14.500	15.900	15.750	89.400	
4	Caio Souza (BRA)	14.950	14.400	14.600	15.000	15.250	14.650	88.850	
5	Daniel Corral Barron (MEX)	14.450	13.850	15.000	14.650	15.100	13.750	86.800	
6	Donnell Whittenburg (USA)	14.700	13.350	15.650	15.000	15.500	12.550	86.750	
7	Hugh Smith (CAN)	14.050	14.250	13.750	15.000	14.250	13.600	84.900	
8	Randy Leru (CUB)	14.200	12.900	14.200	14.600	14.600	13.250	83.750	
9	Lucas Bitencourt (BRA)	12.850	14.350	14.350	14.900	13.650	12.650	82.750	
10	Daniel Gomez Barreno (ECU)	12.900	13.350	13.900	14.250	14.050	13.600	82.050	
11	René Cournoyer (CAN)	13.300	12.500	14.400	13.800	14.000	13.200	81.200	
12	Junior Rojo Mendoza (VEN)	13.300	13.100	13.000	14.800	13.750	13.200	81.150	
13	Tarik Soto Byfield (CRC)	13.700	13.250	11.900	14.750	13.300	13.650	80.550	
14	Jorge Vega Lopez (GUA)	14.900	11.000	13.400	15.350	13.150	12.400	80.200	
15	Christian Bruno (CHI)	13.450	10.700	13.550	14.300	12.700	14.000	78.700	
16	Jostyn Fuenmayor (VEN)	12.900	12.500	13.450	13.850	13.850	11.400	77.950	
17	Daniel Aguero Barrera (PER)	12.600	12.300	11.850	14.300	12.300	12.900	76.250	
18	Joel Alvarez (CHI)	13.100	11.150	13.500	13.700	10.400	13.950	75.800	
19	Mauricio Gallegos (PER)	11.600	12.850	12.200	12.650	11.350	12.850	73.500	
20	Pablo Velasquez (ESA)	12.400	12.150	11.400	13.850	11.150	10.950	71.900	
21	Cristhian Meneses (URU)	11.550	9.650	12.550	14.150	10.600	12.000	70.500	
22	Javier Cervantes (MEX)		11.750	13.500	13.600	13.600	13.400	65.850	
23	Angel Ramos (PUR)		11.500	13.300	14.400	13.350	13.250	65.800	
24	Marco Riveros (BOL)	11.550	4.150	9.750	12.550	12.100	10.250	60.350	
