= Pan American Artistic Gymnastics Championships – Men's parallel bars =

The Pan American Gymnastics Championships were first held in 1997.

Three medals are awarded: gold for first place, silver for second place, and bronze for third place.

== Medalists ==
Year	Location	Gold	Silver	Bronze	Ref
1997	(Colombia) Medellín	(Cuba) Erick López	(Cuba) Francisco Diaz	(Colombia) Jorge Hugo Giraldo	
2001	(Mexico) Cancún	(Cuba) Erick López	(Colombia) Jorge Hugo Giraldo	(Puerto Rico) Luis Vargas Velásquez	
2004	(Venezuela) Maracaibo	(Venezuela) Fernando Fuentes	(Brazil) Luiz Anjos	(Venezuela) Johny Parra Marana	
2005	(Brazil) Rio de Janeiro	(Cuba) Abel Driggs Santos	(Canada) Adam Wong	(Canada) Grant Golding	
2008	(Argentina) Rosario	(Venezuela) José Luis Fuentes	(United States) Danell Leyva	(Argentina) Federico Molinari	
2010	(Mexico) Guadalajara	(Mexico) Daniel Corral	(Canada) Kenneth Ikeda	(Colombia) Jorge Hugo Giraldo	
2012	(Colombia) Medellín	(Colombia) Jorge Hugo Giraldo	(Brazil) Sérgio Sasaki	(Puerto Rico) Luis Rivera	
2013	(Puerto Rico) San Juan	(Cuba) Manrique Larduet	(Colombia) Jorge Hugo Giraldo	(Brazil) Sérgio Sasaki	
2014	(Canada) Mississauga	(Colombia) Jorge Hugo Giraldo	(Cuba) Manrique Larduet	(Brazil) Caio Souza	
2016	(Bolivia) Sucre	(Colombia) Dilan Jiménez	(Brazil) Caio Souza	(Guatemala) Jorge Vega	
2017	(Peru) Lima	(Brazil) Caio Souza	(Argentina) Osvaldo Martinez	(Dominican Republic) Audrys Nin Reyes	
2018	(Peru) Lima	(Cuba) Manrique Larduet	(Colombia) Jossimar Calvo	(United States) Cameron Bock	
2021	(Brazil) Rio de Janeiro	(Brazil) Caio Souza	(Colombia) Javier Sandoval	(Brazil) Diogo Soares	
2022	(Brazil) Rio de Janeiro	(United States) Yul Moldauer	(United States) Colt Walker	(Brazil) Caio Souza	
2023	(Colombia) Medellín	(United States) Yul Moldauer	(United States) Shane Wiskus	(Colombia) Dilan Jiménez	
2024	(Colombia) Santa Marta	(Colombia) Dilan Jiménez	(Brazil) Diogo Soares	(Venezuela) Adickxon Trejo	
2025	Panama City	(Canada) Félix Dolci	(Brazil) Diogo Soares	(Canada) Evgeny Siminiuc	
2026	(Brazil) Rio de Janeiro	(United States) Yul Moldauer	(Brazil) Diogo Soares	(Cuba) Diorges Escobar	

== Medal table ==
Rank	Nation	Gold	Silver	Bronze	Total
1	Cuba (CUB)	5	2	1	8
2	Colombia (COL)	4	4	3	11
3	United States (USA)	3	3	1	7
4	Brazil (BRA)	2	6	4	12
5	Venezuela (VEN)	2	0	2	4
6	Canada (CAN)	1	2	2	5
7	Mexico (MEX)	1	0	0	1
8	Argentina (ARG)	0	1	1	2
9	Puerto Rico (PUR)	0	0	2	2
10	Dominican Republic (DOM)	0	0	1	1
10	Guatemala (GUA)	0	0	1	1
Totals (11 entries)		18	18	18	54
