= Pan American Artistic Gymnastics Championships – Men's team all-around =

The Pan American Gymnastics Championships were first held in 1997.

Three medals are awarded: gold for first place, silver for second place, and bronze for third place.

== Medalists ==
Year	Location	Gold	Silver	Bronze	Ref
1997	(Colombia) Medellín	Cuba; Eric López; Francisco Diaz; Lazaro Lamelas; Yoandy Diaz	United States; Sanjuan Jones; Michael Dutka; Aaron Cotter; Jay Thornton	Colombia; Noé Rodríguez; Alexander Rangel; Jorge Hugo Giraldo; Leonardo González	
2001	(Mexico) Cancún	Cuba; Eric López; Charles Tamayo; Lazaro Lamelas; Michel Brito	United States; Todd Thornton; Kris Zimmerman; Guard Young; Daniel Diaz-Luong	Puerto Rico; Luis Vargas; Diego Lizardi	
2005	(Brazil) Rio de Janeiro	United States; Guillermo Alvarez; Joseph Hagerty; Jonathan Horton; David Durante	Puerto Rico; Luis Rivera; Luis Vargas; Jose Ramos; Reinaldo Oquendo	Canada; Adam Wong; Brandon O'Neil; Grant Golding; Nathan Gafuik	
2010	(Mexico) Guadalajara	United States; Dylan Akers; Alexander Buscaglia; Jacob Dalton; Brian del Castillo; Wesley Haagensen; Glen Ishino	Brazil; Felipe Polato; Mosiah Rodrigues; Sergio Eras; Péricles Silva; Danilo Nogueira; Sérgio Sasaki Canada; Kenneth Ikeda; Anderson Loran; Jayd Lukenchuk; Kevin Lytwyn; Jackson Payne; Casey Sandy	—N/a	
2014	(Canada) Mississauga	United States; Sean Melton; Christopher Maestas; Marvin Kimble; Jonathan Horton; Brandon Wynn; Eddie Penev	Colombia; Jossimar Calvo; Jorge Hugo Giraldo; Jhonny Muñoz; Carlos Calvo; Javier Sandoval; Jorge Pena Castiblanco	Brazil; Lucas Bitencourt; Sérgio Sasaki; Caio Souza; Diego Hypólito; Francisco Barreto Júnior; Arthur Zanetti	
2018	(Peru) Lima	United States; Cameron Bock; Spencer Goodell; Riley Loos; Kanji Oyama; Genki Suzuki	Colombia; Jossimar Calvo; Didier Lugo; Andrés Martínez; Javier Sandoval; Jose David Toro	Brazil; Francisco Barreto; Lucas Bittencourt; Leonardo de Souza; Luís Porto; Caio Souza	
2021	(Brazil) Rio de Janeiro	Brazil; Francisco Barretto; Tomás Florêncio; Arthur Mariano; Diogo Soares; Caio Souza	United States; Cameron Bock; Vitaliy Guimaraes; Paul Juda; Riley Loos; Donnell Whittenburg	Colombia; Kristopher Bohórquez; Jossimar Calvo; José Martínez; Javier Sandoval; José David Toro	
2022	(Brazil) Rio de Janeiro	United States; Riley Loos; Brody Malone; Yul Moldauer; Colt Walker; Shane Wiskus	Brazil; Lucas Bitencourt; Arthur Mariano; Diogo Soares; Caio Souza; Arthur Zanetti	Canada; Félix Dolci; Mathys Jalbert; Chris Kaji; Jayson Rampersad; Kenji Tamane	
2023	(Colombia) Medellín	United States; Taylor Christopulos; Yul Moldauer; Curran Phillips; Donnell Whittenburg; Shane Wiskus; Khoi Young	Canada; Félix Blacquiere; Zachary Clay; Félix Dolci; William Émard; Léandre Sauvé; Samuel Zakutney	Brazil; Bernardo Actos; Lucas Bittencourt; Tomás Florêncio; Yuri Guimarães; Patrick Sampaio; Leonardo Souza	
2024	(Colombia) Santa Marta	Brazil; Lucas Bitencourt; Tomás Florêncio; Patrick Sampaio; Diogo Soares; Caio Souza; Gabriel Faria	Colombia; Kristopher Bohórquez; Jordan Castro; Dilan Jiménez; Andrés Martínez; José Martínez	Argentina; Santiago Agostinelli; Luca Alfieri; Julian Jato; Santiago Mayol; Daniel Villafañe	
2025	Panama City	United States; Taylor Burkhart; Taylor Christopulos; Brandon Dang; Asher Hong; Jun Iwai; Joshua Karnes	Canada; Ioannis Chronopoulos; René Cournoyer; Félix Dolci; Aidan Li; Evgeny Siminiuc	Argentina; Santiago Agostinelli; Luca Alfieri; Julián Jato; Santiago Mayol; Daniel Villafañe	
2026	(Brazil) Rio de Janeiro	Canada; Jordan Carroll; René Cournoyer; Félix Dolci; William Émard; Xavier Olasz; Addyson Cheladyn	Colombia; Jorman Álvarez; Ángel Barajas; Thomas Mejía; Camilo Vera; Yan Zabala	United States; Taylor Burkhart; Patrick Hoopes; Riley Loos; Yul Moldauer; Kameron Nelson; Brandon Dang	

== Medal table ==
Rank	Nation	Gold	Silver	Bronze	Total
1	United States (USA)	7	3	1	11
2	Brazil (BRA)	2	2	3	7
3	Cuba (CUB)	2	0	0	2
4	Canada (CAN)	1	3	2	6
5	Colombia (COL)	0	4	2	6
6	Puerto Rico (PUR)	0	1	1	2
7	Argentina (ARG)	0	0	2	2
Totals (7 entries)		12	13	11	36
