= Gymnastics at the 2015 Pan American Games – Men's artistic team all-around =

Men's artistic team all-around at the 2015 Pan American Games
- Venue: Toronto Coliseum
- Dates: July 11
- Competitors: 46 from 10 nations
- Winning score: 267.750

Medalists
| Gold medal | Marvin Kimble; Steven Legendre; Samuel Mikulak; Paul Ruggeri; Donnell Whittenburg | United States |
| Silver medal | Francisco Junior; Caio Souza; Lucas Bitencourt; Arthur Zanetti; Arthur Mariano | Brazil |
| Bronze medal | Carlos Calvo; Jossimar Calvo; Jorge Hugo Giraldo; Didier Lugo; Jhonny Muñoz | Colombia |

The men's artistic team all-around gymnastic event at the 2015 Pan American Games was held on July 11 at the Toronto Coliseum. This event also acted as the qualification for the all-around and event finals.

== Schedule ==
All times are Eastern Standard Time (UTC-3).

| Date | Time | Round |
|---|---|---|
| July 11, 2015 | 14:30 | Subdivision 1 |
| July 11, 2015 | 19:30 | Subdivision 2 |

== Team competition ==
| Rank | Country | Floor (gymnastics) | Pommel horse | Rings (gymnastics) | Vault (gymnastics) | Parallel bars | Horizontal bar | Total |
|---|---|---|---|---|---|---|---|---|
| 1st place, gold medalist(s) | United States | 44.650 | 44.050 | 44.750 | 44.400 | 44.950 | 44.950 | 267.750 |
| 1st place, gold medalist(s) | Marvin Kimble | | 15.050 | 13.050 | | 14.500 | 14.450 | 267.750 |
| 1st place, gold medalist(s) | Steven Legendre | 13.750 | 13.200 | 14.550 | 14.550 | | | 267.750 |
| 1st place, gold medalist(s) | Samuel Mikulak | 15.000 | 14.850 | 14.750 | 14.600 | 15.550 | 15.100 | 267.750 |
| 1st place, gold medalist(s) | Paul Ruggeri | 14.750 | | | 14.900 | 13.750 | 15.400 | 267.750 |
| 1st place, gold medalist(s) | Donnell Whittenburg | 14.900 | 14.150 | 15.450 | 14.900 | 14.900 | 13.400 | 267.750 |
| 2nd place, silver medalist(s) | Brazil | 41.800 | 43.050 | 45.050 | 45.350 | 44.550 | 44.250 | 264.050 |
| 2nd place, silver medalist(s) | Francisco Junior | | 14.450 | 14.350 | | 14.750 | 14.150 | 264.050 |
| 2nd place, silver medalist(s) | Caio Souza | 13.650 | 13.750 | 14.600 | 15.200 | 15.450 | 14.550 | 264.050 |
| 2nd place, silver medalist(s) | Lucas Bitencourt | 12.650 | 14.300 | 14.650 | 15.050 | 13.900 | 14.700 | 264.050 |
| 2nd place, silver medalist(s) | Arthur Zanetti | 13.900 | | 15.800 | 14.750 | | | 264.050 |
| 2nd place, silver medalist(s) | Arthur Mariano | 14.250 | 14.300 | | 15.100 | 14.350 | 15.000 | 264.050 |
| 3rd place, bronze medalist(s) | Colombia | 40.100 | 43.050 | 45.050 | 45.350 | 44.550 | 44.250 | 259.300 |
| 3rd place, bronze medalist(s) | Carlos Calvo | 10.500 | 14.250 | 13.300 | | 13.650 | 13.350 | 259.300 |
| 3rd place, bronze medalist(s) | Jossimar Calvo | 13.850 | 14.450 | 14.700 | 14.600 | 15.700 | 15.450 | 259.300 |
| 3rd place, bronze medalist(s) | Jorge Hugo Giraldo | | 14.600 | 14.250 | 13.100 | 15.300 | 14.400 | 259.300 |
| 3rd place, bronze medalist(s) | Didier Lugo | 13.100 | | 15.000 | 14.450 | | | 259.300 |
| 3rd place, bronze medalist(s) | Jhonny Muñoz | 13.150 | 13.900 | | 13.500 | 14.550 | 14.000 | 259.300 |
| 4 | Canada | 42.150 | 41.650 | 44.250 | 44.100 | 43.050 | 43.150 | 258.350 |
| 4 | René Cournoyer | 13.300 | 14.550 | 14.200 | 14.350 | 14.200 | 14.050 | 258.350 |
| 4 | Ken Ikeda | | 12.950 | | | 14.200 | 13.800 | 258.350 |
| 4 | Kevin Lytwyn | 14.500 | | 14.950 | 13.700 | 14.650 | 15.300 | 258.350 |
| 4 | Scott Morgan | 14.050 | | 14.950 | 14.950 | | | 258.350 |
| 4 | Hugh Smith | 13.600 | 14.150 | 14.350 | 14.800 | 14.150 | 11.800 | 258.350 |
| 5 | Cuba | 40.950 | 37.150 | 44.000 | 45.250 | 44.350 | 44.550 | 256.250 |
| 5 | Manrique Larduet | 15.150 | 13.850 | 15.400 | 15.200 | 15.600 | 15.050 | 256.250 |
| 5 | Randy Leru | 13.000 | 12.350 | 14.300 | 14.800 | 14.500 | 14.900 | 256.250 |
| 5 | Alberto Leyva | 0.000 | 10.650 | | 15.250 | | | 256.250 |
| 5 | Sandro Perez | 12.800 | | 12.950 | 14.400 | 13.550 | 11.400 | 256.250 |
| 5 | Rafael Rosendi | | 10.950 | 14.300 | | 14.250 | 14.600 | 256.250 |
| 6 | Mexico | 41.600 | 39.950 | 43.900 | 42.800 | 43.000 | 41.600 | 252.850 |
| 6 | Javier Balboa Gonzalez | | 12.100 | 14.750 | | 14.000 | | 252.850 |
| 6 | Rodolfo Bonilla Ruiz | 12.850 | 9.850 | | 13.200 | 14.000 | 12.550 | 252.850 |
| 6 | Kevin Cerda Gastelum | 14.450 | | 13.550 | 14.350 | | 14.650 | 252.850 |
| 6 | Javier Cervantes | 12.450 | 12.650 | 14.200 | 14.750 | 13.850 | 13.550 | 252.850 |
| 6 | Daniel Corral | 14.300 | 15.200 | 14.950 | 13.700 | 15.000 | 13.400 | 252.850 |
| 7 | Puerto Rico | 42.050 | 35.850 | 44.050 | 43.100 | 40.100 | 41.800 | 246.950 |
| 7 | Rafael Morales Casado | 14.100 | 11.850 | 13.600 | 14.150 | | | 246.950 |
| 7 | Tristian Perez | 13.900 | 12.350 | | 14.650 | 13.250 | 14.150 | 246.950 |
| 7 | Angel Ramos | 14.050 | 11.650 | 13.450 | 14.300 | 13.850 | 14.600 | 246.950 |
| 7 | Tommy Ramos Nin | | | 15.400 | | 13.000 | 13.050 | 246.950 |
| 7 | Alexis Torres | | 10.550 | 15.050 | 13.950 | 12.800 | 12.750 | 246.950 |
| 8 | Argentina | 40.750 | 35.700 | 40.600 | 41.350 | 41.300 | 40.750 | 240.450 |
| 8 | Nicolas Cordoba | 13.800 | 12.950 | 12.950 | 13.450 | 13.550 | 14.100 | 240.450 |
| 8 | Osvaldo Martinez | 13.450 | 11.650 | 12.500 | 13.550 | 14.550 | 13.850 | 240.450 |
| 8 | Federico Molinari | 13.500 | 11.100 | 15.150 | 14.350 | 13.200 | 12.800 | 240.450 |
| 9 | Venezuela | 24.100 | 38.300 | 39.400 | 40.650 | 42.000 | 38.300 | 222.750 |
| 9 | Jostyn Fuenmayor | 12.500 | 12.250 | 13.900 | 13.950 | 13.850 | 12.500 | 222.750 |
| 9 | Jose Fuentes | | 14.200 | 13.150 | 12.800 | 14.100 | 12.150 | 222.750 |
| 9 | Junior Rojo Mendoza | 11.600 | 11.850 | 12.350 | 13.900 | 14.050 | 13.650 | 222.750 |
| 10 | Chile | 27.350 | 21.600 | 39.950 | 43.450 | 26.750 | 39.900 | 199.000 |
| 10 | Joel Alvarez | 13.650 | 9.450 | 13.500 | 13.550 | 13.700 | 13.700 | 199.000 |
| 10 | Christian Bruno | 13.700 | 12.150 | 13.750 | 14.550 | 13.050 | 13.850 | 199.000 |
| 10 | Yosias Bustos | | | | | | | 199.000 |
| 10 | Juan Pablo Gonzalez | | | | 14.150 | | 12.350 | 199.000 |
| 10 | Bastian Salazar | | | 12.700 | 14.750 | | | 199.000 |

== Qualification results ==
=== Individual all-around ===
Osvaldo Martinez of Argentina finished in 16th but did not progress to the final due to the fact that his teammates, Nicolas Cordoba and Federico Molinari qualified ahead of him.

| Position | Gymnast | Floor (gymnastics) | Pommel horse | Rings (gymnastics) | Vault (gymnastics) | Parallel bars | Horizontal bar | Total | Notes |
|---|---|---|---|---|---|---|---|---|---|
| 1 | Manrique Larduet (CUB) | 15.150 | 13.850 | 15.400 | 15.200 | 15.60 | 15.050 | 90.250 | Q |
| 2 | Samuel Mikulak (USA) | 15.000 | 14.850 | 14.750 | 14.600 | 15.500 | 15.100 | 89.850 | Q |
| 3 | Jossimar Calvo (COL) | 13.850 | 14.450 | 14.700 | 14.600 | 15.700 | 15.450 | 88.750 | Q |
| 4 | Donnell Whittenburg (USA) | 14.900 | 14.150 | 15.450 | 14.900 | 14.900 | 13.400 | 87.700 | Q |
| 5 | Caio Souza (BRA) | 13.650 | 13.750 | 14.600 | 15.200 | 15.450 | 14.500 | 87.200 | Q |
| 6 | Daniel Corral (MEX) | 14.300 | 15.200 | 14.950 | 13.700 | 15.000 | 13.400 | 86.550 | Q |
| 7 | Lucas Bitencourt (BRA) | 12.650 | 14.300 | 14.650 | 15.050 | 13.900 | 14.700 | 85.250 | Q |
| 8 | René Cournoyer (CAN) | 13.300 | 14.550 | 14.200 | 14.350 | 14.200 | 14.050 | 84.650 | Q |
| 9 | Randy Leru (CUB) | 13.000 | 12.350 | 14.300 | 14.800 | 14.500 | 14.900 | 83.850 | Q |
| 10 | Hugh Smith (CAN) | 13.600 | 14.150 | 14.350 | 14.800 | 14.150 | 11.800 | 82.850 | Q |
| 11 | Angel Ramos (PUR) | 14.050 | 11.650 | 13.450 | 14.300 | 13.850 | 14.600 | 81.900 | Q |
| 12 | Javier Cervantes (MEX) | 12.450 | 12.650 | 14.200 | 14.750 | 13.850 | 13.550 | 81.450 | Q |
| 13 | Christian Bruno (CHI) | 13.700 | 12.150 | 13.750 | 14.550 | 13.050 | 13.850 | 81.050 | Q |
| 14 | Nicolas Cordoba (ARG) | 13.800 | 12.950 | 12.950 | 13.450 | 13.550 | 14.100 | 80.800 | Q |
| 15 | Federico Molinari (ARG) | 13.500 | 11.100 | 15.150 | 14.350 | 13.200 | 12.800 | 80.100 | Q |
| 16 | Osvaldo Martinez (ARG) | 13.450 | 11.650 | 12.500 | 13.550 | 14.550 | 13.850 | 79.550 | |
| 17 | Jostyn Fuenmayor (VEN) | 12.500 | 12.250 | 13.900 | 13.950 | 13.850 | 12.500 | 78.950 | Q |
| 18 | Jorge Vega Lopez (GUA) | 14.850 | 10.850 | 13.300 | 14.400 | 13.150 | 12.250 | 78.800 | Q |
| 19 | Daniel Gomez Barreno (ECU) | 11.500 | 12.100 | 12.700 | 14.050 | 13.900 | 14.300 | 78.550 | Q |
| 20 | Joel Alvarez (CHI) | 13.650 | 9.450 | 13.500 | 13.550 | 13.700 | 13.700 | 77.550 | Q |
| 21 | Junior Rojo Mendoza (VEN) | 11.600 | 11.850 | 12.350 | 13.900 | 14.050 | 13.650 | 77.400 | Q |
| 22 | Tarik Soto Byfield (CRC) | 12.700 | 12.900 | 12.800 | 14.600 | 12.000 | 11.700 | 76.700 | Q |
| 23 | Daniel Aguero Barrera (PER) | 14.200 | 12.350 | 10.900 | 13.750 | 12.500 | 11.850 | 75.550 | Q |
| 24 | Cristhian Meneses (URU) | 12.850 | 10.350 | 12.950 | 13.900 | 12.700 | 11.250 | 74.000 | Q |
| 25 | Mauricio Gallegos (PER) | 11.550 | 13.450 | 12.600 | 13.650 | 10.550 | 11.700 | 73.500 | Q |
| 26 | Kevin Lytwyn (CAN) | 14.500 | | 14.950 | 13.700 | 14.650 | 15.300 | 73.100 | |
| 27 | Arthur Mariano (BRA) | 14.250 | 14.300 | | 15.100 | 14.350 | 15.000 | 73.000 | |
| 28 | Pablo Velasquez (ESA) | 12.200 | 12.300 | 12.300 | 12.900 | 11.350 | 10.850 | 71.900 | R |
| 29 | Jorge Hugo Giraldo (COL) | | 14.600 | 14.250 | 13.100 | 15.300 | 14.400 | 71.650 | |
| 30 | Jhonny Muñoz (COL) | 13.150 | 13.900 | | 13.500 | 14.550 | 14.000 | 69.100 | |
| 31 | Tristian Perez (PUR) | 13.900 | 12.350 | | 14.650 | 13.250 | 14.150 | 68.300 | |
| 32 | Marco Riveros (BOL) | 11.400 | 10.050 | 10.500 | 12.650 | 12.400 | 11.150 | 68.150 | R |
| 33 | Kevin Espinosa (PAN) | 12.500 | 11.750 | 9.300 | 12.650 | 11.350 | 10.550 | 68.100 | R |
| 34 | Jose Fuentes (VEN) | | 14.200 | 13.150 | 12.800 | 14.100 | 12.150 | 66.400 | |
| 35 | Alexis Torres (PUR) | | 10.550 | 15.050 | 13.950 | 12.800 | 12.750 | 65.100 | |
| 36 | Sandro Perez (CUB) | 12.800 | | 12.950 | 14.400 | 13.550 | 11.400 | 65.100 | |
| 37 | Carlos Calvo (COL) | 10.500 | 14.250 | 13.300 | | 13.650 | 13.350 | 65.050 | |
| 38 | Rodolfo Bonilla Ruiz (MEX) | 12.850 | 9.850 | | 13.200 | 14.000 | 12.550 | 62.450 | |
| 39 | Paul Ruggeri (USA) | 14.750 | | | 14.900 | 13.750 | 15.400 | 58.800 | |
| 40 | Francisco Junior (BRA) | | 14.450 | 14.350 | | 14.750 | 14.150 | 57.700 | |
| 41 | Marvin Kimble (USA) | | 15.050 | 13.050 | | 14.500 | 14.450 | 57.050 | |
| 42 | Kevin Cerda Gastelum (MEX) | 14.450 | | 13.550 | 14.350 | | 14.650 | 57.000 | |
| 43 | Steven Legendre (USA) | 13.750 | 13.200 | 14.550 | 14.550 | | | 56.050 | |
| 44 | Rafael Rosendi (CUB) | | 10.950 | 14.300 | | 14.250 | 14.600 | 54.100 | |
| 45 | Rafael Morales Casado (PUR) | 14.100 | 11.850 | 13.600 | 14.150 | | | 53.700 | |
| 46 | Arthur Zanetti (BRA) | 13.900 | | 15.800 | 14.750 | | | 44.450 | |
| 47 | Scott Morgan (CAN) | 14.050 | | 14.950 | 14.950 | | | 43.950 | |
| 48 | Didier Lugo (COL) | 13.100 | | 15.000 | 14.450 | | | 42.550 | |
| 49 | Audrys Nin Reyes (DOM) | 13.100 | | | 13.800 | | 14.650 | 41.550 | |
| 50 | Tommy Ramos Nin (PUR) | | | 15.400 | | 13.000 | 13.050 | 41.450 | |
| 51 | Ken Ikeda (CAN) | | 12.950 | | | 14.200 | 13.800 | 40.950 | |
| 52 | Javier Balboa Gonzalez (MEX) | | 12.100 | 14.750 | | 14.000 | | 40.850 | |
| 53 | Bastian Salazar (CHI) | | | 12.700 | 14.750 | | | 27.450 | |
| 54 | Juan Pablo Gonzalez (CHI) | | | | 14.150 | | 12.350 | 26.500 | |
| 55 | Alberto Leyva (CUB) | 0.000 | 10.650 | | 15.250 | | | 25.900 | |
| 56 | William Albert (TTO) | | | 13.050 | | | | 13.050 | |

=== Floor ===
Paul Ruggeri of the United States finished in 5th but did not progress to the final due to the fact that his US teammates, Samuel Mikulak and Donnell Whittenburg qualified ahead of him.

| Position | Gymnast | Floor (gymnastics) | Notes |
|---|---|---|---|
| 1 | Manrique Larduet (CUB) | 15.150 | Q |
| 2 | Samuel Mikulak (USA) | 15.000 | Q |
| 3 | Donnell Whittenburg (USA) | 14.900 | Q |
| 4 | Jorge Vega Lopez (GUA) | 14.850 | Q |
| 5 | Kevin Lytwyn (CAN) | 14.500 | Q |
| 6 | Kevin Cerda Gastelum (MEX) | 14.450 | Q |
| 7 | Daniel Corral (MEX) | 14.300 | Q |
| 8 | Arthur Mariano (BRA) | 14.250 | Q |
| 9 | Daniel Aguero (PER) | 14.200 | R |
| 10 | Rafael Morales Casado (PUR) | 14.100 | R |
| 11 | Angel Ramos (PUR) | 14.050 | R |

=== Pommel horse ===
| Position | Gymnast | Pommel horse | Notes |
|---|---|---|---|
| 1 | Daniel Corral (MEX) | 15.200 | Q |
| 2 | Marvin Kimble (USA) | 15.050 | Q |
| 3 | Samuel Mikulak (USA) | 14.850 | Q |
| 4 | Jorge Hugo Giraldo (COL) | 14.600 | Q |
| 5 | René Cournoyer (CAN) | 14.550 | Q |
| 6 | Francisco Junior (BRA) | 14.450 | Q |
| 7 | Jossimar Calvo (COL) | 14.450 | Q |
| 8 | Lucas Bittencourt (BRA) | 14.300 | Q |
| 9 | Jose Fuentes (VEN) | 14.200 | R |
| 10 | Hugh Smith (CAN) | 14.150 | R |
| 11 | Manrique Larduet (CUB) | 13.850 | R |

=== Rings ===
| Position | Gymnast | Rings (gymnastics) | Notes |
|---|---|---|---|
| 1 | Arthur Zanetti (BRA) | 15.800 | Q |
| 2 | Donnell Whittenburg (USA) | 15.450 | Q |
| 3 | Manrique Larduet (CUB) | 15.400 | Q |
| 4 | Tommy Ramos Nin (PUR) | 15.400 | Q |
| 5 | Federico Molinari (ARG) | 15.150 | Q |
| 6 | Alexis Torres (PUR) | 15.050 | Q |
| 7 | Didier Lugo (COL) | 15.000 | Q |
| 8 | Kevin Lytwyn (CAN) | 14.950 | Q |
| 9 | Daniel Corral (MEX) | 14.950 | R |
| 10 | Scott Morgan (CAN) | 14.950 | R |
| 11 | Samuel Mikulak (USA) | 14.750 | R |

=== Vault ===
| Position | Gymnast | Score 1 | Score 2 | Total | Notes |
|---|---|---|---|---|---|
| 1 | Caio Souza (BRA) | 15.200 | 15.250 | 15.225 | Q |
| 2 | Manrique Larduet (CUB) | 15.200 | 14.700 | 14.950 | Q |
| 3 | Arthur Mariano (BRA) | 15.100 | 14.700 | 14.900 | Q |
| 4 | Donnell Whittenburg (USA) | 14.900 | 14.850 | 14.875 | Q |
| 5 | Alberto Leyva (CUB) | 15.250 | 14.350 | 14.800 | Q |
| 6 | Paul Ruggeri (USA) | 14.900 | 14.700 | 14.800 | Q |
| 7 | Scott Morgan (CAN) | 14.950 | 14.600 | 14.775 | Q |
| 8 | Jorge Vega Lopez (GUA) | 14.400 | 15.100 | 14.750 | Q |
| 9 | Tarik Soto Byfield (CRC) | 14.600 | 14.150 | 14.375 | R |
| 10 | Javier Cervantes (MEX) | 14.750 | 13.350 | 14.050 | R |
| 11 | Audrys Nin Reyes (DOM) | 13.800 | 13.950 | 13.875 | R |

=== Parallel bars ===
| Position | Gymnast | Parallel bars | Notes |
|---|---|---|---|
| 1 | Jossimar Calvo (COL) | 15.700 | Q |
| 2 | Manrique Larduet (CUB) | 15.600 | Q |
| 3 | Samuel Mikulak (USA) | 15.550 | Q |
| 4 | Caio Souza (BRA) | 15.450 | Q |
| 5 | Jorge Hugo Giraldo (COL) | 15.300 | Q |
| 6 | Daniel Corral (MEX) | 15.000 | Q |
| 7 | Donnell Whittenburg (USA) | 14.900 | Q |
| 8 | Francisco Junior (BRA) | 14.750 | Q |
| 9 | Kevin Lytwyn (CAN) | 14.650 | R |
| 10 | Osvaldo Martinez (ARG) | 14.550 | R |
| 11 | Randy Leru (CUB) | 14.500 | R |

=== Horizontal bar ===
| Position | Gymnast | Horizontal bar | Notes |
|---|---|---|---|
| 1 | Jossimar Calvo (COL) | 15.450 | Q |
| 2 | Paul Ruggeri (USA) | 15.400 | Q |
| 3 | Kevin Lytwyn (CAN) | 15.300 | Q |
| 4 | Samuel Mikulak (USA) | 15.100 | Q |
| 5 | Manrique Larduet (CUB) | 15.050 | Q |
| 6 | Arthur Mariano (BRA) | 15.000 | Q |
| 7 | Randy Leru (CUB) | 14.900 | Q |
| 8 | Lucas Bitencourt (BRA) | 14.700 | Q |
| 9 | Kevin Cerda Castellum (MEX) | 14.650 | R |
| 10 | Audrys Nin Reyes (DOM) | 14.650 | R |
| 11 | Angel Ramos (PUR) | 14.600 | R |
