= Gymnastics at the 2015 Pan American Games – Men's pommel horse =

Men's pommel horse at the 2015 Pan American Games
- Venue: Toronto Coliseum
- Dates: July 14
- Competitors: 44
- Winning score: 15.025

Medalists
Gold medal	Jossimar Calvo	Colombia
Gold medal	Marvin Kimble	United States
Bronze medal	Daniel Corral	Mexico

The men's pommel horse gymnastic event at the 2015 Pan American Games was held on July 14 at the Toronto Coliseum.

== Schedule ==
All times are Eastern Standard Time (UTC-3).

Date	Time	Round
July 14, 2015	13:35	Final

== Results ==
=== Qualification ===
Position	Gymnast	Pommel horse	Notes
1	Daniel Corral (MEX)	15.200	Q
2	Marvin Kimble (USA)	15.050	Q
3	Samuel Mikulak (USA)	14.850	Q
4	Jorge Hugo Giraldo (COL)	14.600	Q
5	René Cournoyer (CAN)	14.550	Q
6	Francisco Junior (BRA)	14.450	Q
7	Jossimar Calvo (COL)	14.450	Q
8	Lucas Bittencourt (BRA)	14.300	Q
9	Jose Fuentes (VEN)	14.200	R
10	Hugh Smith (CAN)	14.150	R
11	Manrique Larduet (CUB)	13.850	R

=== Final ===
Position	Gymnast	Pommel horse	Notes
1st place, gold medalist(s)	Jossimar Calvo (COL)	15.025	
1st place, gold medalist(s)	Marvin Kimble (USA)	15.025	
3rd place, bronze medalist(s)	Daniel Corral (MEX)	14.825	
4	Jorge Hugo Giraldo (COL)	14.775	
5	Samuel Mikulak (USA)	14.575	
6	Francisco Junior (BRA)	14.450	
7	René Cournoyer (CAN)	13.875	
8	Lucas Bittencourt (BRA)	12.825	
