= Gymnastics at the 2015 Pan American Games – Men's parallel bars =

Men's parallel bars at the 2015 Pan American Games
- Venue: Toronto Coliseum
- Dates: July 15
- Competitors: 45
- Winning score: 15.700

Medalists
Gold medal	Jossimar Calvo	Colombia
Silver medal	Manrique Larduet	Cuba
Bronze medal	Samuel Mikulak	United States

The men's parallel bars gymnastic event at the 2015 Pan American Games was held on July 15 at the Toronto Coliseum.

== Schedule ==
All times are Eastern Standard Time (UTC-3).

Date	Time	Round
July 15, 2015	14:40	Final

== Results ==
=== Qualification ===
Position	Gymnast	Parallel bars	Notes
1	Jossimar Calvo (COL)	15.700	Q
2	Manrique Larduet (CUB)	15.600	Q
3	Samuel Mikulak (USA)	15.550	Q
4	Caio Souza (BRA)	15.450	Q
5	Jorge Hugo Giraldo (COL)	15.300	Q
6	Daniel Corral (MEX)	15.000	Q
7	Donnell Whittenburg (USA)	14.900	Q
8	Francisco Junior (BRA)	14.750	Q
9	Kevin Lytwyn (CAN)	14.650	R
10	Osvaldo Martinez (ARG)	14.550	R
11	Randy Leru (CUB)	14.500	R

=== Final ===
Position	Gymnast	Parallel bars	Notes
1st place, gold medalist(s)	Jossimar Calvo (COL)	15.700	
2nd place, silver medalist(s)	Manrique Larduet (CUB)	15.650	
3rd place, bronze medalist(s)	Samuel Mikulak (USA)	15.450	
4	Jorge Hugo Giraldo (COL)	15.375	
5	Donnell Whittenburg (USA)	15.350	
6	Daniel Corral (MEX)	15.175	
7	Caio Souza (BRA)	13.725	
8	Francisco Junior (BRA)	12.600	
