= Gymnastics at the 2015 Pan American Games – Men's vault =

Men's vault at the 2015 Pan American Games
- Venue: Toronto Coliseum
- Dates: July 15
- Competitors: 18
- Winning score: 15.125

Medalists
Gold medal	Manrique Larduet	Cuba
Silver medal	Donnell Whittenburg	United States
Bronze medal	Caio Souza	Brazil

The men's vault gymnastic event at the 2015 Pan American Games was held on July 15 at the Toronto Coliseum.

== Schedule ==
All times are Eastern Standard Time (UTC-3).

Date	Time	Round
July 15, 2015	13:35	Final

== Results ==
=== Qualification ===
Position	Gymnast	Score 1	Score 2	Total	Notes
1	Caio Souza (BRA)	15.200	15.250	15.225	Q
2	Manrique Larduet (CUB)	15.200	14.700	14.950	Q
3	Arthur Mariano (BRA)	15.100	14.700	14.900	Q
4	Donnell Whittenburg (USA)	14.900	14.850	14.875	Q
5	Alberto Leyva (CUB)	15.250	14.350	14.800	Q
6	Paul Ruggeri (USA)	14.900	14.700	14.800	Q
7	Scott Morgan (CAN)	14.950	14.600	14.775	Q
8	Jorge Vega Lopez (GUA)	14.400	15.100	14.750	Q
9	Tarik Soto Byfield (CRC)	14.600	14.150	14.375	R
10	Javier Cervantes (MEX)	14.750	13.350	14.050	R
11	Audrys Nin Reyes (DOM)	13.800	13.950	13.875	R

=== Final ===
Position	Gymnast	Score 1	Score 2	Total	Notes
1st place, gold medalist(s)	Manrique Larduet (CUB)	15.200	15.050	15.125	
2nd place, silver medalist(s)	Donnell Whittenburg (USA)	15.075	14.850	14.962	
3rd place, bronze medalist(s)	Caio Souza (BRA)	14.725	15.125	14.925	
4	Jorge Vega Lopez (GUA)	14.800	14.750	14.775	
5	Paul Ruggeri (USA)	14.725	14.700	14.712	
6	Scott Morgan (CAN)	14.325	14.825	14.575	
7	Arthur Mariano (BRA)	14.700	13.475	14.087	
8	Alberto Leyva (CUB)	13.475	14.375	13.925	
