= Gymnastics at the 2017 Bolivarian Games =

Gymnastics at the 2013 Bolivarian Games
- Dates: 11–17 November 2017
- Nations: 11

Gymnastics events at the 2017 Bolivarian Games took place from November 11 to November 17, 2017.

== Medalists ==
=== Artistic gymnastics ===
==== Men ====
Event	Gold	Silver	Bronze
Team all-round	Colombia; Carlos Calvo; Jossimar Calvo; Jhon Cardona; Andrés Martínez; Juan Sánchez; Erick Vargas	Venezuela; Jostyn Fuenmayor; José Luis Fuentes; Jose Manama; Maycol Puentes; Junior Rojo; Adickxon Trejo	Chile; Joel Alvarez; Christian Decidet; Gabriel Flores; Luis Peralta; Ignacio Pizarro; Ignacio Varas
Individual all-round	Jossimar Calvo; Colombia	Jostyn Fuenmayor; Venezuela	Carlos Calvo; Colombia
Floor exercise	Jossimar Calvo; Colombia	Jorge Vega Lopez; Guatemala	Joel Alvarez; Chile
Pommel horse	Jossimar Calvo; Colombia	Adickxon Trejo; Venezuela	José Luis Fuentes; Venezuela
Rings	Jostyn Fuenmayor; Venezuela	Jossimar Calvo; Colombia	José Luis Fuentes; Venezuela
Vault	Jorge Vega Lopez; Guatemala	Daniel Aguero; Peru	Junior Rojo; Venezuela
Parallel bars	Jossimar Calvo; Colombia	Jostyn Fuenmayor; Venezuela	Joel Alvarez; Chile
Horizontal bar	Joel Alvarez; Chile	shared gold	Israel Chiriboga; Ecuador
Horizontal bar	Carlos Calvo; Colombia	shared gold	Israel Chiriboga; Ecuador

==== Women ====
Event	Gold	Silver	Bronze
Team all-round	Colombia; Dayana Ardila; Yurany Avendaño; Ginna Escobar; Laura Pardo; Angie Quintana; Marcela Sandoval	Chile; Paula Carvajal; Martina Castro; Rayen López; Franchesca Santi; Camila Vilches	Peru; Katherine Alejo; Salma Cruzado; Venere Horna; Ana Karina Méndez; Ángela Pérez
Individual all-round	Ginna Escobar; Colombia	Yurany Avendaño; Colombia	Yamilet Peña; Dominican Republic
Vault	Yamilet Peña; Dominican Republic	Dayana Ardila; Colombia	Franchesca Santi; Chile
Uneven bars	Yurany Avendaño; Colombia	Yamilet Peña; Dominican Republic	Ana Irene Palacios; Guatemala
Balance beam	Marcela Sandoval; Colombia	Venere Horna; Peru	Ginna Escobar; Colombia
Floor exercise	Pamela Arriojas; Venezuela	Yamilet Peña; Dominican Republic	shared silver
Floor exercise	Pamela Arriojas; Venezuela	Ana Irene Palacios; Guatemala	shared silver

=== Rhythmic gymnastics ===
==== Women ====
Event	Gold	Silver	Bronze
Team all-round	Colombia; Lina Dussan; Isabella Arevalo; Mariana Sanchez	Venezuela; Grisbel Lopez; Maria Waleska Ojeda; Sofia Suarez	Ecuador; Elisa Baldeon; Noelia Dominguez; Solange Otero
Individual all-round	Lina Dussan; Colombia	Grisbel Lopez; Venezuela	Isabella Arevalo; Colombia
Hoop	Isabella Arevalo; Colombia	Lina Dussan; Colombia	Javiera Rubilar; Chile
Ball	Lina Dussan; Colombia	Grisbel Lopez; Venezuela	Javiera Rubilar; Chile
Clubs	Lina Dussan; Colombia	Grisbel Lopez; Venezuela	Javiera Rubilar; Chile
Ribbon	Lina Dussan; Colombia	Grisbel Lopez; Venezuela	Isabella Arevalo; Colombia

=== Trampoline ===
Event	Gold	Silver	Bronze
Men's individual	Ángel Hernández; Colombia	Antonio Sepulveda; Chile	Xavier Castrillon; Venezuela
Men's synchro	Colombia; Ángel Hernández; Álvaro Calero	Venezuela; Xavier Castrillon; Gabriel Marcano	Ecuador; Patricio Navarrete; Eduardo Cojitambo
Women's individual	Katherin Rojo; Venezuela	Andrea Lopez; Venezuela	Dayanara Zacari; Bolivia
Women's synchro	Venezuela; Katherin Rojo; Andrea Lopez	Bolivia; Dayanara Zacari; Mariana Espejo	not awarded
