= Gymnastics at the 2015 Pan American Games – Men's floor =

Men's floor at the 2015 Pan American Games
- Venue: Toronto Coliseum
- Dates: July 14
- Competitors: 44
- Winning score: 15.150

Medalists
| Gold medal | Jorge Vega Lopez | Guatemala |
| Silver medal | Donnell Whittenburg | United States |
| Bronze medal | Samuel Mikulak | United States |

The men's floor gymnastic event at the 2015 Pan American Games was held on July 14 at the Toronto Coliseum.

== Schedule ==
All times are Eastern Standard Time (UTC-3).

| Date | Time | Round |
|---|---|---|
| July 14, 2015 | 13:35 | Final |

== Results ==
=== Qualification ===
Paul Ruggeri of the United States finished in 5th but did not progress to the final because his US teammates, Samuel Mikulak and Donnell Whittenburg qualified ahead of him.

| Position | Gymnast | Floor (gymnastics) | Notes |
|---|---|---|---|
| 1 | Manrique Larduet (CUB) | 15.150 | Q |
| 2 | Samuel Mikulak (USA) | 15.000 | Q |
| 3 | Donnell Whittenburg (USA) | 14.900 | Q |
| 4 | Jorge Vega Lopez (GUA) | 14.850 | Q |
| 5 | Kevin Lytwyn (CAN) | 14.500 | Q |
| 6 | Kevin Cerda Gastelum (MEX) | 14.450 | Q |
| 7 | Daniel Corral (MEX) | 14.300 | Q |
| 8 | Arthur Mariano (BRA) | 14.250 | Q |
| 9 | Daniel Aguero Barrera (PER) | 14.200 | R |
| 10 | Rafael Morales Casado (PUR) | 14.100 | R |
| 11 | Angel Ramos (PUR) | 14.050 | R |

=== Final ===
| Position | Gymnast | Floor (gymnastics) | Notes |
|---|---|---|---|
| 1st place, gold medalist(s) | Jorge Vega Lopez (GUA) | 15.150 | |
| 2nd place, silver medalist(s) | Donnell Whittenburg (USA) | 14.975 | |
| 3rd place, bronze medalist(s) | Samuel Mikulak (USA) | 14.925 | |
| 4 | Manrique Larduet (CUB) | 14.775 | |
| 5 | Arthur Mariano (BRA) | 14.700 | |
| 6 | Kevin Lytwyn (CAN) | 14.675 | |
| 7 | Daniel Corral (MEX) | 14.425 | |
| 8 | Kevin Cerda Gastelum (MEX) | 14.350 | |
