= Gymnastics at the 2016 Summer Olympics – Men's artistic individual all-around =

Men's artistic individual all-around at the Games of the XXXI Olympiad
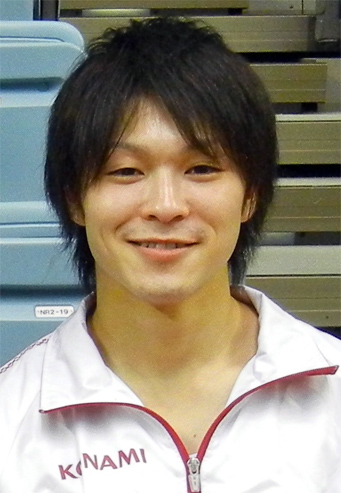
- Gold medalist Kōhei Uchimura (2011)
- Venue: HSBC Arena
- Dates: 6–10 August 2016
- Competitors: 49 from 31 nations
- Winning score: 92.365 points

Medalists
1st place, gold medalist(s)		Kōhei Uchimura; Japan
2nd place, silver medalist(s)		Oleg Verniaiev; Ukraine
3rd place, bronze medalist(s)		Max Whitlock; Great Britain

The men's artistic individual all-around competition at the 2016 Summer Olympics was held on 6 and 10 August 2016 at the HSBC Arena. Kōhei Uchimura won gold, becoming the first male gymnast in 44 years (and third overall) to do this in two successive Olympic Games. Uchimura also became the second man to earn three all-around medals, matching countryman Sawao Kato with two golds and one silver. Uchimura's victory was Japan's sixth in the men's all-around, tying the Soviet Union for most all-time. His margin of victory was only 0.099, which was less than one small step on landing in terms of gymnastic scoring. It was also his eighth consecutive victory at the top competition of the year (World Championships and Olympics from 2009 to 2016). Oleg Verniaiev's silver was Ukraine's first medal in the event since 2000. Max Whitlock's bronze was Great Britain's first since the 1908 Games in London.

The medals were presented by Princess Nora of Liechtenstein, IOC Member from Liechtenstein, accompanied by Vasily Titov, FIG Executive Committee member.

== Background ==
This was the 27th appearance of the men's individual all-around. The first individual all-around competition had been held in 1900, after the 1896 competitions featured only individual apparatus events. A men's individual all-around has been held every Games since 1900.

Five of the top 10 gymnasts from the 2012 Games returned. Gold medalist Kōhei Uchimura of Japan, silver medalist Marcel Nguyen of Germany, 4th place finisher Nikolai Kuksenkov of Ukraine (now competing for Russia), 5th place finisher David Belyavskiy of Russia, and 10th place finisher Sergio Sasaki of Brazil. Uchimura was favored and had been dominant for the last two Olympic cycles. He had followed the silver all-around medal in 2008 with three World Championships (2009–2011), Olympic gold in 2012, and then three more World Championships (2013–2015).

Cyprus and Lithuania each made their debut in the event. France made its 25th appearance, most among nations.

== Qualification ==
Qualification for the men's artistic gymnastics in 2016 was based primarily on the 2015 World Artistic Gymnastics Championships. The top 8 teams at the world championships could send a full team of 5 gymnasts to the Olympics. The next 8 teams (#9 through #16) competed in the 2012 Gymnastics Olympic Test Event, with the top 4 of those teams also qualifying a team of 5 gymnasts for the Olympics. The individual apparatus medalists from the World Championships also qualified, if their nation had not already qualified a team. There were places reserved for host country and continental representation, and the Tripartite Commission made an invitation. The quota of 98 gymnasts was then filled through the individual all-around rankings at the Test Event, with each nation able to qualify only one gymnast in that manner (though this one gymnast could be added to the world championship apparatus medalists—e.g., Romania qualified Marian Drăgulescu as silver medalist in the vault and Andrei Muntean through the Test Event).

Only gymnasts competing in all six apparatus exercises in the qualifying round were ranked for the individual all-around qualifying.

== Competition format ==
The top 24 qualifiers in the qualification phase (limit two per NOC), based on combined score of each apparatus, advanced to the individual all-around final. The finalists will perform on each apparatus again, and scores in qualification do not count anymore. Scoring was according to the Code of Points.

== Schedule ==
All times are local (UTC−3)

Date	Time	Round
Saturday, 6 August 2016	10:30	Qualifying
Wednesday, 10 August 2016	16:00	Final

== Results ==
=== Qualifying ===
The gymnasts who ranked top twenty four qualified for final round. In case of there were more than two gymnasts in same NOC, the last ranked among them would not qualify to final round. The next best ranked gymnast would qualify instead.

Rank	Gymnast	Nation	Floor (gymnastics)	Pommel horse	Rings (gymnastics)	Vault (gymnastics)	Parallel bars	Horizontal bar	Total	Notes
1	Oleg Verniaiev	Ukraine	14.833	15.566	15.200	15.066	16.166	15.133	91.964	Q
2	Kōhei Uchimura	Japan	15.533	14.966	14.700	15.533	15.466	14.300	90.498	Q
3	David Belyavskiy	Russia	14.600	15.300	14.533	14.900	15.933	14.533	89.799	Q
4	Deng Shudi	China	15.033	14.866	14.300	15.300	15.800	14.366	89.665	Q
5	Nile Wilson	Great Britain	15.066	14.133	14.941	14.700	14.900	15.500	89.240	Q
6	Ryōhei Katō	Japan	15.033	14.800	13.996	14.933	15.500	15.000	89.232	Q
7	Sam Mikulak	United States	15.800	13.100	14.533	15.100	15.375	15.133	89.041	Q
8	Sérgio Sasaki	Brazil	14.900	14.833	14.133	15.266	14.933	14.833	88.898	Q
9	Nikolai Kuksenkov	Russia	14.666	15.383	14.333	14.900	15.366	14.100	88.848	Q
10	Lin Chaopan	China	13.666	15.033	14.133	15.233	15.700	14.866	88.631	Q
11	Arthur Mariano	Brazil	15.200	14.433	14.033	15.100	14.933	14.766	88.465	Q
12	Max Whitlock	Great Britain	15.500	15.800	14.600	13.700	15.066	13.566	88.232	Q
13	Jossimar Calvo	Colombia	14.175	15.033	14.166	13.766	15.400	14.966	87.506	Q
14	Bart Deurloo	Netherlands	14.000	14.200	14.266	14.858	14.566	15.100	86.990	Q
15	Manrique Larduet	Cuba	15.200	13.866	15.100	11.766	15.766	15.116	86.814	Q
16	Andrey Likhovitskiy	Belarus	14.200	15.233	13.866	13.966	14.900	14.600	86.765	Q
17	Brinn Bevan	Great Britain	14.233	14.733	14.333	14.133	14.966	14.366	86.764	2 per NOC
18	Francisco Barretto Júnior	Brazil	13.433	14.533	14.200	14.200	14.900	15.266	86.532	2 per NOC
19	Chris Brooks	United States	14.533	12.766	14.566	14.400	15.300	14.766	86.331	Q
20	Oleg Stepko	Azerbaijan	13.900	14.975	14.033	14.400	15.300	13.600	86.208	Q
21	Pablo Brägger	Switzerland	14.500	13.933	14.033	13.800	14.833	15.100	86.199	Q
22	Marcel Nguyen	Germany	14.500	13.433	14.733	14.600	15.466	13.366	86.098	Q
23	Axel Augis	France	14.033	14.500	14.333	13.166	15.300	14.700	86.032	Q
24	Andreas Bretschneider	Germany	14.800	13.641	14.158	14.633	14.833	13.633	85.698	Q
25	Eddy Yusof	Switzerland	15.033	14.133	14.533	15.200	13.300	13.166	85.365	Q
26	Marios Georgiou	Cyprus	13.566	14.066	13.366	14.733	14.858	14.700	85.289	Q
27	Park Min-soo	South Korea	13.400	13.600	14.400	14.033	15.033	14.800	85.266	R1
28	Nikita Nagornyy	Russia	14.066	14.541	14.900	15.266	13.133	12.733	84.639	2 per NOC
29	Julien Gobaux	France	13.066	14.233	14.500	13.700	14.766	14.300	84.565	R2
30	Oliver Hegi	Switzerland	13.966	14.066	14.200	14.500	14.333	13.366	84.431	2 per NOC
31	Néstor Abad	Spain	14.033	13.400	14.333	14.900	12.966	14.766	84.398	R3
32	Stian Skjerahaug	Norway	14.166	14.233	13.266	14.700	14.266	13.700	84.331	R4
33	Frank Rijken	Netherlands	13.866	13.966	13.700	14.200	14.500	14.033	84.265	
34	Petro Pakhnyuk	Azerbaijan	14.133	14.233	13.600	14.300	14.166	13.783	84.215	
35	Oskar Kirmes	Finland	14.933	14.000	13.833	14.200	13.891	13.266	84.123	
36	Andrei Muntean	Romania	13.733	12.500	13.700	14.633	15.466	13.833	83.865	
37	Anton Fokin	Uzbekistan	11.800	14.333	13.966	14.400	15.466	13.866	83.831	
38	Kieran Behan	Ireland	14.333	12.866	14.133	14.300	14.000	13.600	83.232	
39	Maksym Semiankiv	Ukraine	14.200	13.700	13.666	13.633	13.300	14.566	83.065	
40	Jeffrey Wammes	Netherlands	14.533	11.933	12.941	14.900	14.333	14.066	82.706	
41	Ferhat Arıcan	Turkey	13.133	13.866	13.733	13.533	14.733	13.633	82.631	
42	Robert Tvorogal	Lithuania	13.866	13.366	13.466	14.133	13.500	14.166	82.497	
43	Randy Lerú	Cuba	13.000	11.966	13.400	14.166	15.000	14.866	82.398	
44	Ludovico Edalli	Italy	12.433	13.333	13.666	13.933	14.400	14.033	81.798	
45	Mikhail Koudinov	New Zealand	13.200	12.600	13.433	14.133	14.700	12.833	80.899	
46	Ryan Patterson	South Africa	14.300	13.033	13.333	13.733	13.000	13.291	80.690	
47	David Jessen	Czech Republic	12.233	12.166	13.366	14.500	13.100	14.316	79.681	
48	Mohamed Bourguieg	Algeria	12.533	12.900	13.033	13.700	13.500	12.833	78.499	
49	Kévin Crovetto	Monaco	12.858	11.800	12.866	13.166	12.700	12.666	76.056	

=== Final ===
Both Georgiou and Larduet were forced to retire from the competition due to injury.

Rank	Gymnast	Nation	Floor (gymnastics)	Pommel horse	Rings (gymnastics)	Vault (gymnastics)	Parallel bars	Horizontal bar	Total
1st place, gold medalist(s)	Kōhei Uchimura	Japan	15.766	14.900	14.733	15.566	15.600	15.800	92.365
2nd place, silver medalist(s)	Oleg Verniaiev	Ukraine	15.033	15.533	15.300	15.500	16.100	14.800	92.266
3rd place, bronze medalist(s)	Max Whitlock	Great Britain	15.200	15.875	14.733	15.133	15.000	14.700	90.641
4	David Belyavskiy	Russia	15.000	14.766	14.533	15.133	15.933	15.133	90.498
5	Lin Chaopan	China	14.866	14.833	14.733	14.966	15.666	15.166	90.230
6	Deng Shudi	China	14.966	14.533	14.433	15.266	15.966	14.966	90.130
7	Sam Mikulak	United States	15.200	14.600	14.366	14.566	15.766	15.133	89.631
8	Nile Wilson	Great Britain	14.900	14.066	14.933	15.000	15.700	14.966	89.565
9	Sérgio Sasaki	Brazil	14.833	14.766	14.433	15.200	14.966	15.000	89.198
10	Jossimar Calvo	Colombia	14.650	14.700	14.433	14.833	15.366	14.933	88.915
11	Ryōhei Katō	Japan	15.266	14.900	14.566	15.058	14.900	13.900	88.590
12	Eddy Yusof	Switzerland	14.633	14.033	14.716	15.066	14.933	14.533	87.914
13	Nikolai Kuksenkov	Russia	14.733	13.300	14.700	14.966	15.233	14.800	87.732
14	Chris Brooks	United States	14.600	13.200	14.633	14.933	15.066	15.200	87.632
15	Bart Deurloo	Netherlands	14.666	14.733	14.633	14.700	14.300	14.566	87.598
16	Pablo Brägger	Switzerland	14.933	14.033	13.908	14.300	15.033	15.166	87.373
17	Arthur Mariano	Brazil	15.133	13.400	14.133	14.766	14.633	15.266	87.331
18	Andrey Likhovitskiy	Belarus	14.300	15.033	13.933	14.033	14.966	14.366	86.631
19	Marcel Nguyen	Germany	14.733	12.666	14.600	14.666	14.900	14.466	86.031
20	Andreas Bretschneider	Germany	14.733	13.500	13.833	14.533	14.533	13.833	84.965
21	Axel Augis	France	13.933	13.100	13.933	14.266	14.766	12.900	82.898
22	Oleg Stepko	Azerbaijan	12.266	13.100	14.533	14.916	13.800	10.466	79.081
—	Marios Georgiou	Cyprus	—	—	—	12.833	12.466	9.433	DNF
—	Manrique Larduet	Cuba	—	—	15.133	14.000	—	—	DNF
