= Gymnastics at the 2015 Pan American Games – Men's rings =

Men's Rings at the 2015 Pan American Games
- Venue: Toronto Coliseum
- Dates: July 14
- Competitors: 47
- Winning score: 15.725

Medalists
Gold medal	Arthur Zanetti	Brazil
Silver medal	Donnell Whittenburg	United States
Bronze medal	Manrique Larduet	Cuba

The Men's Rings gymnastic event at the 2015 Pan American Games was held on July 14 at the Toronto Coliseum.

== Schedule ==
All times are Eastern Standard Time (UTC-3).

Date	Time	Round
July 14, 2015	15:30	Final

== Results ==
=== Qualification ===
Position	Gymnast	Rings (gymnastics)	Notes
1	Arthur Zanetti (BRA)	15.800	Q
2	Donnell Whittenburg (USA)	15.450	Q
3	Manrique Larduet (CUB)	15.400	Q
4	Tommy Ramos Nin (PUR)	15.400	Q
5	Federico Molinari (ARG)	15.150	Q
6	Alexis Torres (PUR)	15.050	Q
7	Didier Lugo Sichaca (COL)	15.000	Q
8	Kevin Lytwyn (CAN)	14.950	Q
9	Daniel Corral (MEX)	14.950	R
10	Scott Morgan (CAN)	14.950	R
11	Samuel Mikulak (USA)	14.750	R

=== Final ===
Position	Gymnast	Rings (gymnastics)	Notes
1st place, gold medalist(s)	Arthur Zanetti (BRA)	15.725	
2nd place, silver medalist(s)	Donnell Whittenburg (USA)	15.525	
3rd place, bronze medalist(s)	Manrique Larduet (CUB)	15.450	
4	Tommy Ramos Nin (PUR)	15.350	
5	Federico Molinari (ARG)	15.200	
6	Alexis Torres (PUR)	15.125	
7	Kevin Lytwyn (CAN)	15.050	
8	Didier Lugo Sichaca (COL)	15.000	
