= Templo de Nuestra Señora de la Asunción, Jocotenango =

Church in Jocotenango, Guatemala

Coordinates: 14.5748°N 90.7411°W

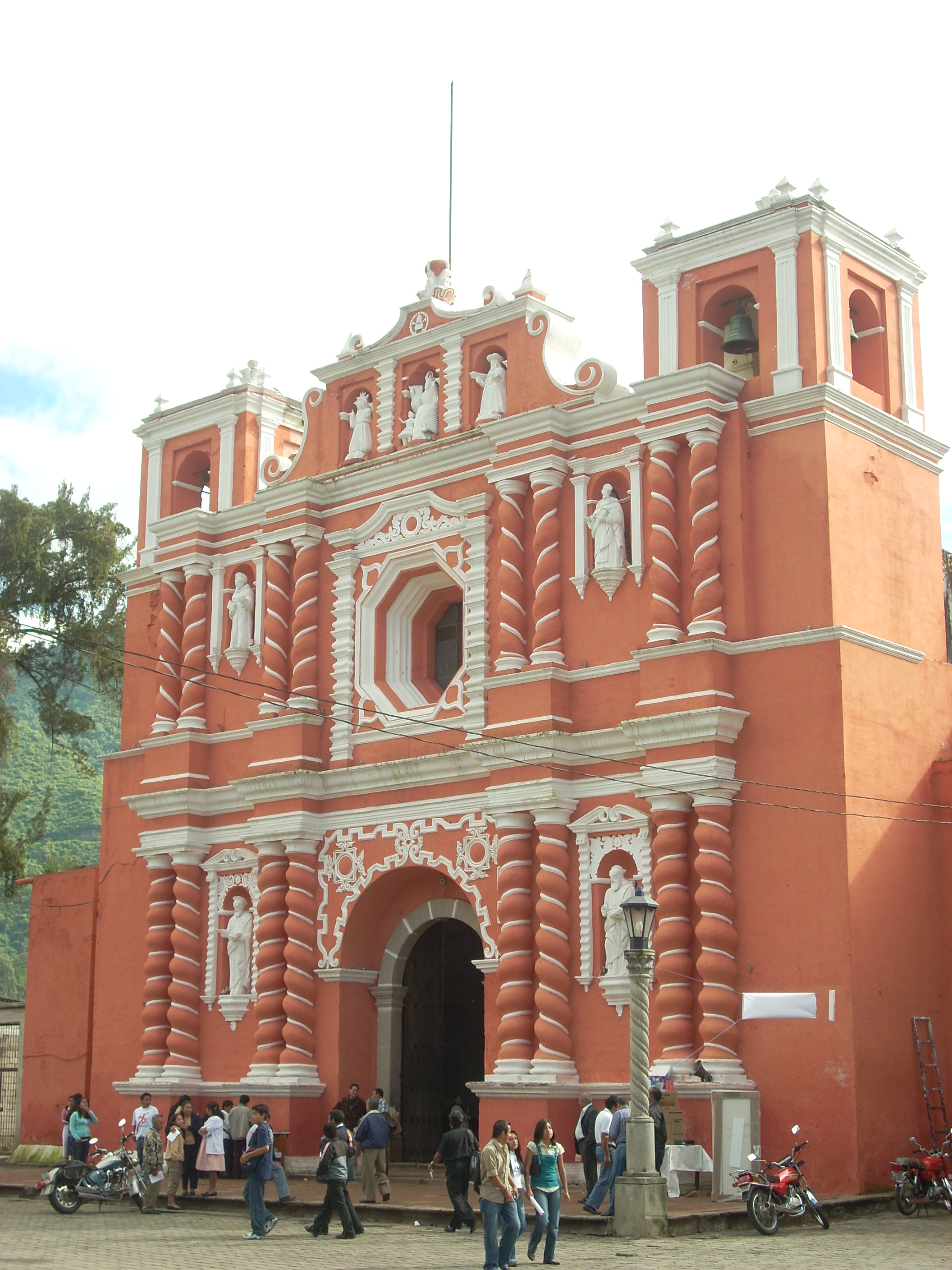
Templo de Nuestra Señora de la Asunción

The Templo de Nuestra Señora de la Asunción (English: Temple of Our Lady of the Assumption) is a church in Jocotenango, Guatemala.

The church is situated on the Plazuela de Jocotenango, the main town square, and is the centre of annual local celebrations of Our Lady of the Assumption (that is to say, of the Virgin Mary).
