= 2015 Winter Cup =

Artistic gymnastics competition in the USA

- Venue: Riviera
- Location: Las Vegas, Nevada, U.S.
- Dates: February 19—February 21, 2015

The 2015 Winter Cup was an artistic gymnastics competition held at the Riviera in Las Vegas from February 19 to February 21, 2015.

== Competition ==
The finals session featured the top 42 gymnasts according to their all-around ranking and the top three gymnasts on each apparatus. The all-around and individual event champions were determined via a combined two-day score. Performances at the Winter Cup helped determine eight men who comprised the United States men's national gymnastics team at the 2015 U.S. National Gymnastics Championships.

== Medalists ==
Event	Gold	Silver	Bronze
Senior Men
Individual all-around	Paul Ruggeri	Steven Legendre	Donnell Whittenburg
Floor	Steven Legendre	Stacey Ervin	Paul Ruggeri
Pommel horse	Ellis Mannon	Marvin Kimble	Donothan Bailey; Alec Yoder
Rings	Marvin Kimble	Steven Lacombe	Steven Legendre
Vault	Paul Ruggeri	Steven Legendre	Joshua Dixon
Parallel bars	Danell Leyva	Donnell Whittenburg	Marvin Kimble
Horizontal bar	Paul Ruggeri	Jordan Valdez	Robert Neff
