= Marvin Kimble =

American artistic gymnast (born 1995)

- Full name: Marvin Kimble
- Born: October 27, 1995 (age 30) Milwaukee, Wisconsin, U.S.
- Height: 5 ft 4 in (163 cm)

Gymnastics career
- Discipline: Men's artistic gymnastics
- Country represented: United States (2014–2019)
- Gym: Beaches Gymnastics; Salto Gymnastics Center; USOTC; Team Hilton; Swiss Turners Gymnastics Academy
- Head coach: Andrey Kan
- Assistant coach: Anthony Ingrelli
- Retired: May 2021
Medal record
Men's artistic gymnastics
Representing United States
Event	1st	2nd	3rd
Pan American Games	2	0	0
Pan American Championships	1	1	0
Pacific Rim Championships	2	0	0
Total	5	1	0
Pan American Games
Gold medal – first place	2015 Toronto	Team
Gold medal – first place	2015 Toronto	Pommel horse
Pan American Championships
Gold medal – first place	2014 Mississauga	Team
Silver medal – second place	2014 Mississauga	Pommel horse
Pacific Rim Championships
Gold medal – first place	2018 Medellín	Team
Gold medal – first place	2018 Medellín	Pommel horse

Marvin Kimble (born October 27, 1995) is a retired American artistic gymnast. He was a member of the United States men's national artistic gymnastics team and in 2015, Kimble and Jossimar Calvo of Colombia won the gold medal in the men's pommel horse event at the 2015 Pan American Games held in Toronto, Canada.

== Early life and education ==
Kimble was born on October 27, 1995, in Milwaukee, Wisconsin, to Marvin Kimble and Carolyn Crenshaw. He trained at Swiss Turners Gymnastics Academy. He attended Alexander Hamilton High School and graduated in 2014.

== Gymnastics career ==
Kimble competed at the 2015 Winter Cup and won gold on rings, silver on pommel horse, and bronze on parallel bars. He competed at the 2016 Winter Cup where he won bronze on horizontal bar. He again competed at the 2018 Winter Cup where he won gold on vault and silver in the all-around.

In 2018, he won the gold medal in the men's pommel horse event at the 2018 Pacific Rim Gymnastics Championships held in Medellín, Colombia.

Kimble is also known for his horizontal bar, parallel bars, and rings. He has won multiple titles in those events and the All Around. In 2018 he won the silver on the horizontal bar at the Doha World Cup. He also got 7th on Parallel Bars and 8th on the Rings. In 2017 Marvin won the silver at the Cottbus World Cup. Marvin attended the 2017 World Championship in Montreal Canada.

Kimble trained with Donnell Whittenburg at Salto Gymnastics Center, with hopes of qualifying for the 2020 Summer Olympics, but retired a month before the 2020 U.S. Olympic trials.
