= Jocotenango =

- Municipality
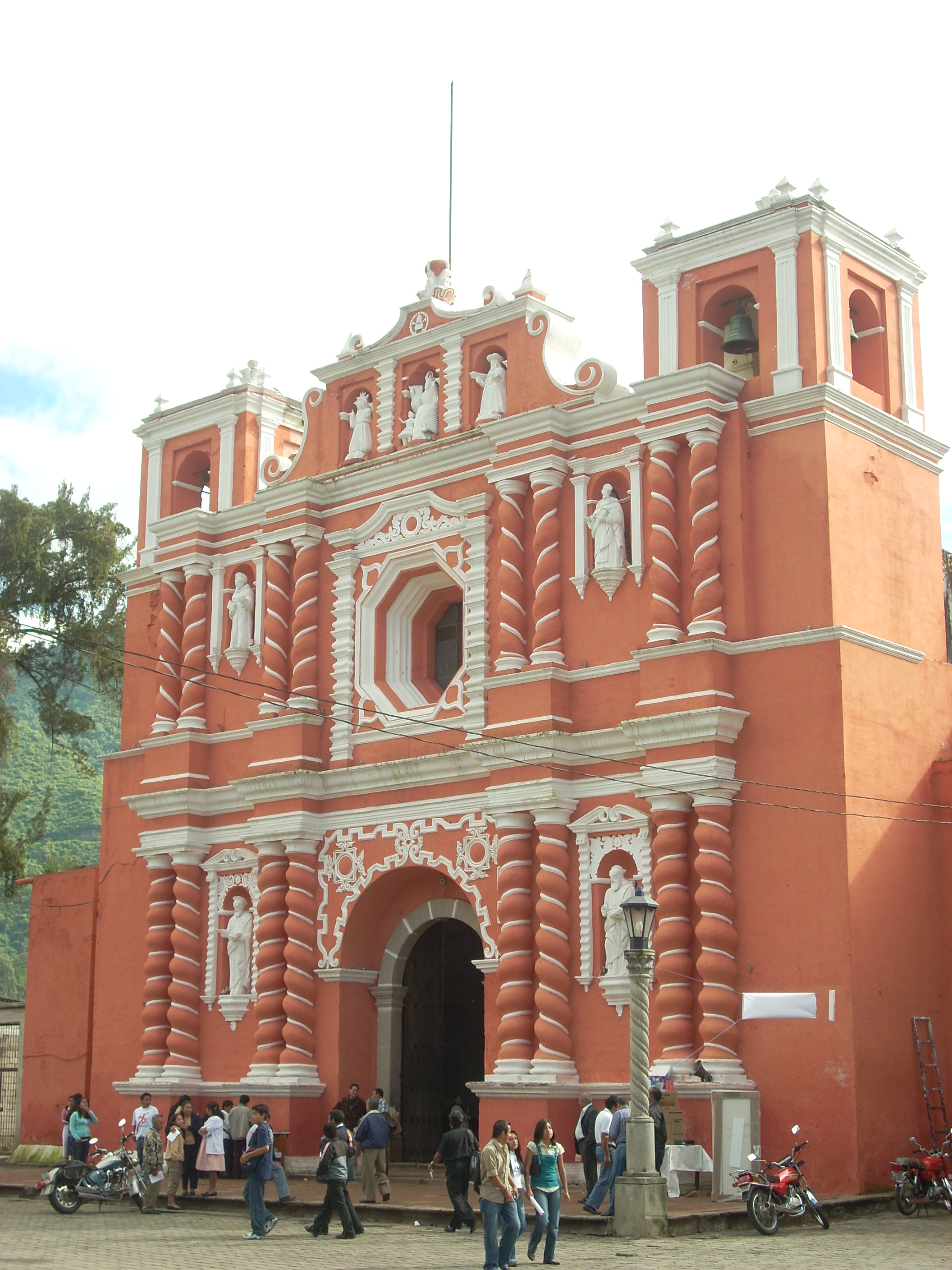
- Templo de Nuestra Señora de la Asunción, Jocotenango

- Location in Guatemala
- Coordinates: 14°34′55″N 90°44′37″W
- Country: Guatemala
- Department: Sacatepéquez

Area
  - Municipality: 10.4 km^{2} (4.0 sq mi)

Population (2018)
  - Municipality: 21,657
  - Density: 2,100/km^{2} (5,400/sq mi)
  - Urban: 19,280
- Time zone: UTC−6 (CST)
- Climate: Cwb

Jocotenango (alternate: Xocotenango; translation from Kaqchikel: "place of many plums") is a town and small municipality in the northeast section of Guatemalan department of Sacatepéquez, and is situated north of Antigua Guatemala. It has seven zones, two villages, and one hamlet. According to the 2018 census, the municipality has a total population of 21,657 of which 1,680 are native population and the rest are non-indigenous; and approximately 19,280 live in an urban area, while the rest are rural dwellers.

Jocotenango is the birthplace of multi Grammy Award-winning singer and songwriter Ricardo Arjona.

== History ==
Jocotenango was initially an agricultural field, set up after the Spanish conquest by Adelantado, Pedro de Alvarado, as it was specified in his will, which read: "Called the lords and principals of the town that he had assigned to him, and ask that each one of them give him a certain number of families, and with them he created that settlement; he freed them and donated to them their land; and as the first natives who gathered there were from Utatlán, the town was called Utateca". So was founded the Santiago Utateca settlement. After the destruction of the old kingdom capital on 11 September 1541, the city was moved to Panchoy valley, and the K'achik'eles decided to follow the Spaniards and settled next to Santiago Utateca, founding Jocotenango; eventually both town combined. In the 1540, bishop Francisco Marroquín split the religious administration of the Guatemalan central valley between the Order of Preachers and the Franciscans, assigned the formet the Jocotenango curato, among others.

After the destruction of Santiago de los Caballeros de Guatemala by the Santa Marta earthquake in 1773, the city moved, this time to La Ermita valley. the old neighborhoods followed suit, among them: Jocotenango, Almolonga, San Pedro, San Gaspas and Nuestra Señora de Guatemala. Thus, there was a second Jocotenango settlement next to the new Guatemala City, which was eventually swallowed by the metropolis and is part of the modern Zone 2.

The old Jocotenango, previously considered a suburb, received municipality status in the middle of the 19th century.

== Geography ==
It is 9 km^{2} (9.0 km^{2}) in size and is situated 1,540 m (5,050 ft) above sea level. Cerro El Narizón ("Big Nose Mountain"), one of the peaks of the El Rejon range is nearby, reaching an elevation of 2,247 m (7,372 ft). Hydrographic features include the Rio Guacalate, streams, and a creek. Jocotenango is located in a mountainous rain forest in a sub-tropical region. According to the 2003 Ministerio de Agricultura (English:Secretary of Agriculture) report, approximately 93 hectares are used for agriculture, while 75 hectares are in forest. Deposits of Placedrín Andesite have been found here.

Vulnerability to natural disaster is evidenced by severe erosion to the Rio Guacalate basin, forest fires, accelerated deforestation, and floods. Slope sediment, along with poor soil management, is most visible in the villages of La Rinconada and Vista Hermosa. An annual threat to the populated areas is flooding during periods of rainfall. It requires the municipality to clear hundreds of cubic meters of sediment that accumulates in the streets. This type of erosion causes loss of productive soil capacity, exposure of basement rock, and generation of landslides and mudslides.

The average rainfall is 1344 mm/year while the temperature varies between 16 and 23 °C.

== Flora and fauna ==
The forest coverage rate is important for town's socioeconomics. Most of the wooded area, is located on the hill Panza de Burro and near the municipal yard. Flora includes species of oak, cypress, and palo de jiote (Bursera simaruba).

The fauna is associated with crops that predominate the area such as agouti, coyote, mouse opossum, rabbit, squirrels, white-tailed deer, and gophers. Birds include, hummingbird, quail, hawk, and dove.

== Culture ==
The red brick Templo de Nuestra Señora de la Asunción lies in the town.

La Azotea ("roof") Cultural Center features, built on an ancient coffee estate, has three museums. Casa K'ojom ("House of K'ojom"), a music museum, features traditional Maya musical instruments such as diatomic harp, drums, flutes, marimbas, ocarinas, and whistles. Masks, paintings, traditional costumes and crafts are also exhibited. The Museo del Café ("Museum of Coffee") is dedicated to the history and evolution of coffee cultivation. Coffee beans are displayed in varying stages of production, antique equipment can be viewed, and as it is situated at an actual plantation, on-site tours are available. There is also a small costume museum.

Its main festival is celebrated each year during the week of August 8.

== Transportation ==
Buses bound from Antigua's bus terminal to Chimaltenango stop at Jocotenango.

== Climate ==
Jocotenango has a subtropical highland climate (Köppen climate classification: Cwb).

Climate data for Jocotenango
Month	Jan	Feb	Mar	Apr	May	Jun	Jul	Aug	Sep	Oct	Nov	Dec	Year
Mean daily maximum °C (°F)	22.6 (72.7)	23.5 (74.3)	24.7 (76.5)	25.1 (77.2)	24.7 (76.5)	23.7 (74.7)	23.5 (74.3)	23.9 (75.0)	23.1 (73.6)	22.7 (72.9)	22.9 (73.2)	22.4 (72.3)	23.6 (74.4)
Daily mean °C (°F)	16.7 (62.1)	17.2 (63.0)	18.2 (64.8)	19.2 (66.6)	19.4 (66.9)	19.5 (67.1)	19.0 (66.2)	19.1 (66.4)	18.6 (65.5)	18.2 (64.8)	17.8 (64.0)	16.8 (62.2)	18.3 (65.0)
Mean daily minimum °C (°F)	10.8 (51.4)	11.0 (51.8)	11.8 (53.2)	13.3 (55.9)	14.2 (57.6)	15.3 (59.5)	14.6 (58.3)	14.3 (57.7)	14.2 (57.6)	13.8 (56.8)	12.7 (54.9)	11.2 (52.2)	13.1 (55.6)
Average precipitation mm (inches)	1 (0.0)	3 (0.1)	4 (0.2)	26 (1.0)	117 (4.6)	233 (9.2)	169 (6.7)	142 (5.6)	222 (8.7)	130 (5.1)	17 (0.7)	5 (0.2)	1,069 (42.1)
Source: Climate-Data.org

== Geographic location ==
Jocotenango is surrounded by Sacatepéquez Department municipalities.

== Notable people ==
- Ricardo Arjona, singer-songwriter

== Notes and references ==
=== Bibliography ===
- Gobierno de Guatemala (2006). "Plan de Reconstruccion Departamental de Sacatepequez" (PDF). SEGEPLAN (in Spanish). p. 9. Archived from the original (PDF) on September 11, 2010.
- Juarros, Domingo (1818). Compendio de la historia de la Ciudad de Guatemala (in Spanish). Guatemala: Ignacio Beteta.
