= 2013 Pan American Individual Event Artistic Gymnastics Championships =

International sports competition

The 2013 Pan American Individual Event Artistic Gymnastics Championships were held in San Juan, Puerto Rico, August 8–11, 2013. The competition was organized by the Puerto Rican Gymnastics Federation and approved by the International Gymnastics Federation.

== Medal summary ==
=== Medalists ===
Event	Gold	Silver	Bronze
Men
Floor	Diego Hypólito (BRA)	Manrique Larduet (CUB)	Jossimar Calvo (COL)
Pommel horse	Sérgio Sasaki (BRA)	Jorge Giraldo (COL)	Pericles Silva (BRA)
Rings	Henrique Flores (BRA)	Federico Molinari (ARG) Tommy Ramos (PUR)	—
Vault	Manrique Larduet (CUB)	Diego Hypólito (BRA)	Angel Ramos (PUR)
Parallel bars	Manrique Larduet (CUB)	Jorge Giraldo (COL)	Sérgio Sasaki (BRA)
Horizontal bar	Jossimar Calvo (COL)	Nicolás Córdoba (ARG)	Francisco Barreto (BRA)
Women
Vault	Dovelis Torres (CUB)	Leticia Costa (BRA)	Sandra Collantes (PER)
Uneven bars	Kaitlyn Hofland (CAN)	Jessica López (VEN)	Ivet Rojas (VEN)
Balance beam	Ana Sofía Gómez (GUA)	Jessica López (VEN)	Dovelis Torres (CUB)
Floor	Daniele Hypólito (BRA)	Victoria Moors (CAN)	Leidys Perdomo (CUB)

=== Medal table ===
Rank	Nation	Gold	Silver	Bronze	Total
1	Brazil (BRA)	4	2	3	9
2	Cuba (CUB)	3	1	2	6
3	Colombia (COL)	1	2	1	4
4	Canada (CAN)	1	1	0	2
5	Guatemala (GUA)	1	0	0	1
6	Venezuela (VEN)	0	2	1	3
7	Argentina (ARG)	0	2	0	2
8	Puerto Rico (PUR)	0	1	1	2
9	Peru (PER)	0	0	1	1
Totals (9 entries)		10	11	9	30
