= Francisco Barretto Júnior =

Brazilian artistic gymnast (born 1989)

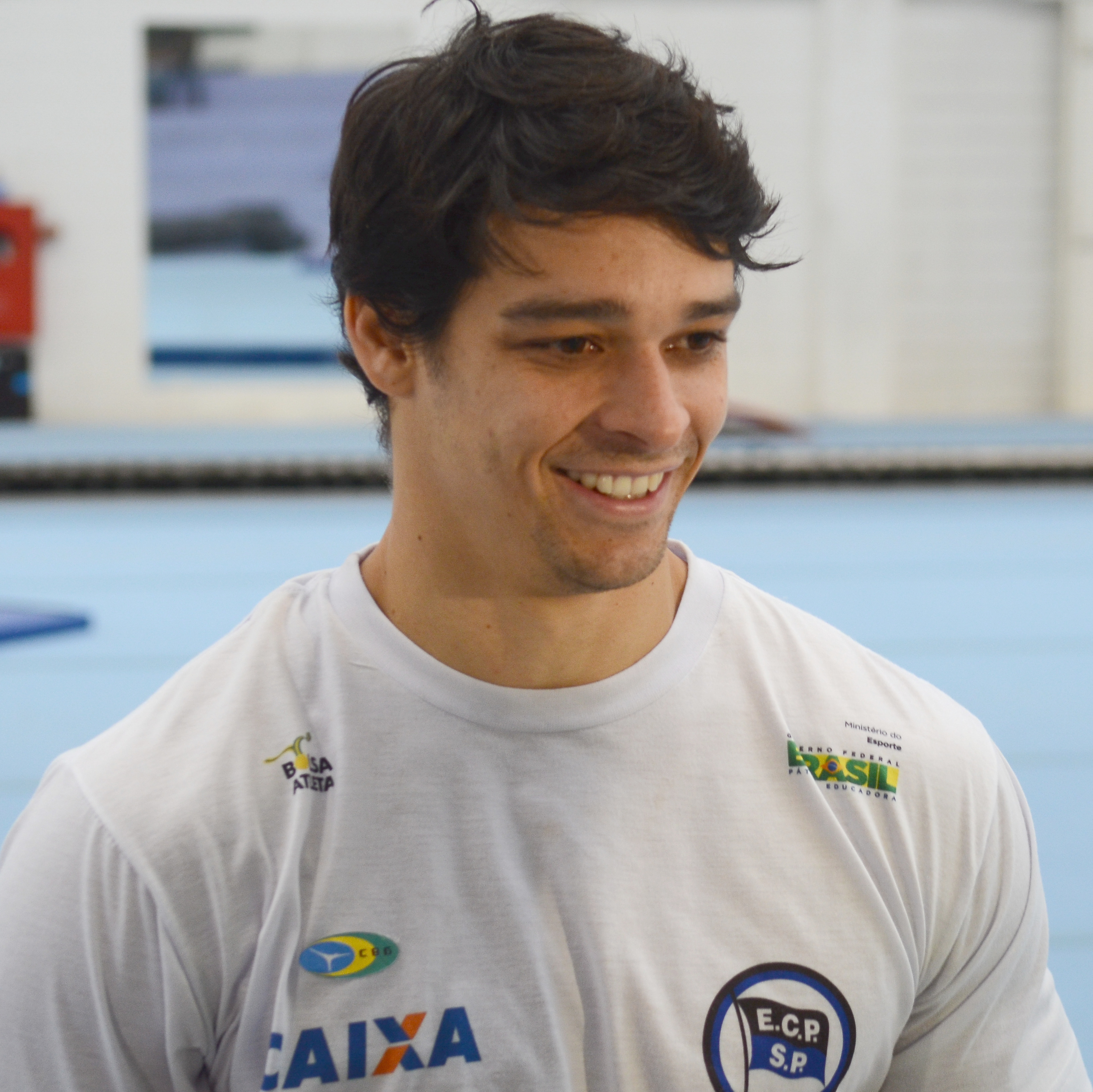
- Barretto in 2016

Personal information
- Full name: Francisco Carlos Barretto Júnior
- Nickname: Chico
- Born: 31 October 1989 (age 36) Ribeirão Preto, Brazil
- Height: 1.75 m (5 ft 9 in)

Gymnastics career
- Discipline: Men's artistic gymnastics
- Country represented: Brazil (2015–2024)
- Club: Esporte Clube Pinheiros
- Head coaches: Cristiano Albino; Hilton Dichelli Junior
Medal record
Representing Brazil
Men's artistic gymnastics
Pan American Games
Gold medal – first place	2011 Guadalajara	Team
Gold medal – first place	2019 Lima	Team
Gold medal – first place	2019 Lima	Pommel horse
Gold medal – first place	2019 Lima	Horizontal bar
Silver medal – second place	2015 Toronto	Team
Pan American Championships
Gold medal – first place	2021 Rio de Janeiro	Team
Silver medal – second place	2018 Lima	Horizontal bar
Bronze medal – third place	2012 Medellín	Floor exercise
Bronze medal – third place	2013 San Juan	Horizontal bar
Bronze medal – third place	2014 Mississauga	Team
Bronze medal – third place	2018 Lima	Team
Bronze medal – third place	2021 Rio de Janeiro	Pommel horse
South American Games
Gold medal – first place	2010 Medellín	Team
Gold medal – first place	2018 Cochabamba	Team
Gold medal – first place	2022 Asunción	Team
Silver medal – second place	2014 Santiago	Team
Bronze medal – third place	2014 Santiago	Pommel horse
Bronze medal – third place	2018 Cochabamba	All-around
Bronze medal – third place	2018 Cochabamba	Horizontal bar
South American Championships
Gold medal – first place	2009 Sogamoso	Vault
Gold medal – first place	2009 Sogamoso	Horizontal bar
Gold medal – first place	2012 Rosario	Team
Gold medal – first place	2012 Rosario	All-around
Gold medal – first place	2012 Rosario	Horizontal bar
Gold medal – first place	2019 Santiago	Team
Gold medal – first place	2019 Santiago	All-around
Gold medal – first place	2023 Cali	Team
Silver medal – second place	2009 Sogamoso	Team
Silver medal – second place	2023 Cali	All-around
Bronze medal – third place	2012 Rosario	Pommel horse
Bronze medal – third place	2012 Rosario	Parallel bars
Bronze medal – third place	2023 Cali	Horizontal bar

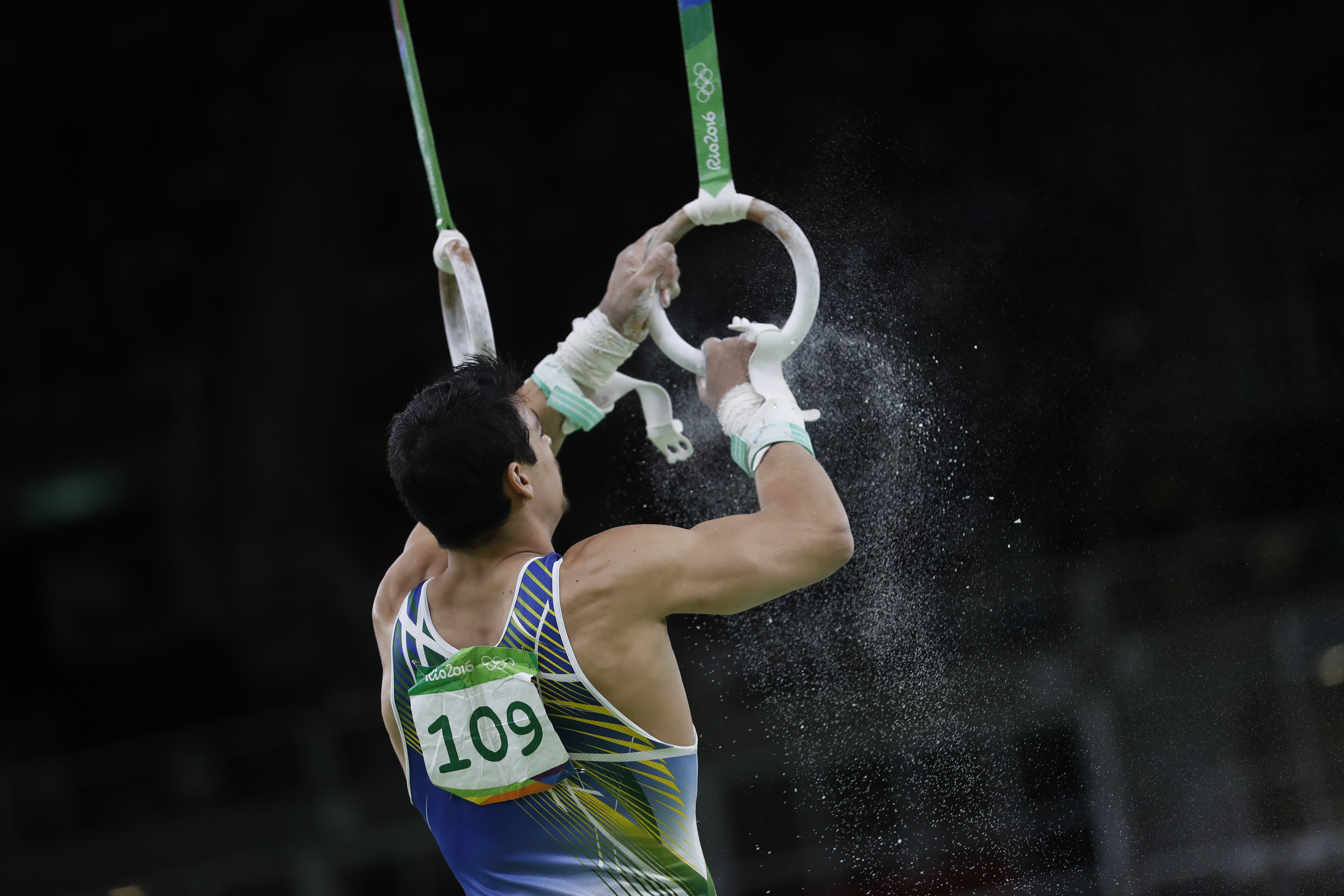
Barretto competes for Brazil on the still rings during the men's team artistic gymnastics event at the Rio 2016 Olympic Games

Francisco Carlos Barretto Júnior OLY (born 31 October 1989) is a Brazilian retired artistic gymnast. He won three gold medals at the 2019 Pan American Games, and he helped Brazil win the team title at the 2011 Pan American Games. He also won a team gold medal at the 2021 Pan American Championships. He competed at the 2016 Summer Olympics and the 2020 Summer Olympics.

== Gymnastics career ==
Barretto began gymnastics in 1997, choosing the sport over others he tried, including skating, handball, and swimming. When he was 13 years old, he moved to São Caetano do Sul to improve his training, and he joined the Esporte Clube Pinheiros in 2014.

=== 2006–2012 ===
At the 2006 Junior Pan American Championships, Barretto won a silver medal in the team event and a bronze medal on the horizontal bar. He won a gold medal with the Brazilian team at the 2011 Pan American Games. He won the individual all-around title at the 2012 South American Championships and also won team and horizontal bar titles.

=== 2013–2014 ===
Barretto won the horizontal bar bronze medal at the 2013 Pan American Championships. He placed sixth in the horizontal bar final at the 2014 Doha World Cup. He then won the horizontal bar bronze medal at the 2014 Anadia World Challenge Cup. He competed with the Brazilian team that won the bronze medal at the 2014 Pan American Championships. He was then selected to compete at the 2014 World Championships, and Brazil advanced to the team final, finishing sixth.

=== 2015–2016 ===
Barretto won a silver medal with team Brazil at the 2015 Pan American Games. He won a bronze medal on the parallel bars at the 2015 São Paulo World Cup, and he won the horizontal bar silver medal at the Anadia World Challenge Cup. At the 2015 World Championships, he helped Brazil place eighth in the team final.

Barretto won a bronze medal on the horizontal bar at the 2016 São Paulo World Challenge Cup. He was selected to represent Brazil at the 2016 Summer Olympics alongside Diego Hypólito, Arthur Mariano, Sérgio Sasaki, and Arthur Zanetti. They advanced to the team final and placed sixth. Individually, he advanced to the horizontal bar final and finished sixth.

=== 2017–2019 ===
While competing at the 2017 Varna World Challenge Cup, Barretto injured his back on the parallel bars. As a result, he was unable to compete at the 2017 World Championships. He returned to competition at the 2018 American Cup and finished eighth. At the 2018 Pan American Championships, he won a bronze medal in the team event and a silver medal on the horizontal bar to teammate Caio Souza. He competed at the 2018 World Championships where the Brazilian team finished seventh.

Barretto represented Brazil at the 2019 Pan American Games and helped the team win the gold medal. Individually, he won gold medals on the pommel horse and the horizontal bar.

=== 2020–2025 ===
Barretto helped Brazil win the team title at the 2021 Pan American Championships, and he won a bronze medal on the pommel horse. He was selected to represent Brazil at the 2020 Summer Olympics alongside Arthur Mariano, Diogo Soares, and Caio Souza, and they placed ninth in the qualification round.

Barretto announced his retirement in 2025 and began coaching.
