= Paul Ruggeri =

American artistic gymnast

- Full name: Paul Ruggeri III
- Born: November 12, 1988 (age 37) Syracuse, New York, U.S.
- Height: 5 ft 9 in (175 cm)

Gymnastics career
- Discipline: Men's artistic gymnastics
- Country represented: United States (2010–2017)
- College team: Illinois Fighting Illini
- Gym: USOTC; Team Hilton Honors; US Gymnastics Development Center; Central New York Gymnastics
- Head coach: Genadi Shub
- Retired: c. 2017
- Awards: Nissen-Emery Award (2012)
Medal record
Men's artistic gymnastics
Representing United States
Event	1st	2nd	3rd
Pan American Games	2	1	2
Total	2	1	2
Pan American Games
Gold medal – first place	2011 Guadalajara	Horizontal bar
Gold medal – first place	2015 Toronto	Team
Silver medal – second place	2011 Guadalajara	Parallel bars
Bronze medal – third place	2011 Guadalajara	Team
Bronze medal – third place	2015 Toronto	Horizontal bar

Paul Ruggeri III (born November 12, 1988) is a retired American gymnast. He was a member of the United States men's national artistic gymnastics team and won a combined five medals at the 2011 and 2015 Pan American Games. He was an alternate for many World Artistic Gymnastics Championships teams for the United States and successfully made his first in 2015.

== Early life and education ==
Ruggeri was born November 12, 1988, in Syracuse, New York, to Paul II and Kathryn Ruggeri. His father was a swimmer and his aunt a gymnast. and he is the grandson of an Italian immigrant. He began gymnastics in 1995 at Central New York Gymnastics. He attended Fayetteville Manlius High School in his hometown of Manlius, New York, before enrolling at the University of Illinois Urbana-Champaign to pursue gymnastics. Ruggeri studied art in high school and enjoys painting, drawing, and photography. He also likes acrobatic water and snow sports.

== Gymnastics career ==
=== College ===
Ruggeri competed for the University of Illinois from 2008 to 2012. In 2008, Ruggeri was the NCAA national champion on horizontal bar. In 2009, he repeated horizontal bar gold and added gold on parallel bars. In February 2012, Ruggeri competed at the 2012 Winter Cup and won bronze on the floor. He was national champion on vault and won silver on parallel bars; the Illini were also national team champions. In 2012 he was named the Nissen Award winner, the gymnastics version of the Heisman.

Ruggeri had five years of college gymnastics because he redshirted (cut short or skipped because of injury) his 2011 (senior) year. The cause was a torn peroneal (ankle) ligament at U.S. elite Winter Cup competition. Over the years, he won nine All-American honors.

=== Senior ===
In 2010, Ruggeri was an alternate on the U.S. squad at the World Championships.

At the 2011 Pan American Games, Ruggeri won gold on the horizontal bar and silver on parallel bars.

At the 2012 US Nationals, Ruggeri finished 7th in the all-around. A member of the U.S. senior national team, Ruggeri hoped to compete in the 2012 Olympics. However, he was not selected. He finished 6th in the all-around at Olympic Trials.

As of March 2013, Ruggeri worked as a gymnastics coach and trained for elite competition. In February 2013, Ruggeri competed at the 2013 Winter Cup, where he won silver on vault and horizontal bar. In April 2013, he participated in a World Cup competition and won gold on vault and horizontal bar. In recognition, the United States Olympic Committee named him as their male athlete of the month. On February 6, 2014, he underwent surgery (meniscectomy) for a meniscus tear in the right knee. He was an alternate on the U.S. men's team to the 2014 world championships.

In February 2015, Ruggeri won the Winter Cup Challenge. In addition to placing first in the all-around competition, he placed first in vault and horizontal bar, and third on floor exercise. He has been named to the U.S. Gymnastics senior national team for 2015.

On July 11, 2015, Ruggeri helped the U.S. Men's Gymnastics team to their first Gold medal in twenty years at the Pan-American Games.

At the 2015 US Nationals, Ruggeri's notable finishes include placing 8th in the all-around, 5th on the floor, and winning a silver medal on the horizontal bar. He was then named to the 2015 World Championship Team that competed in Glasgow, Scotland where he placed 9th in Vault, and 5th as a team. This squad qualified the United States for the 2016 Olympic Games.

Paul was on the scene for three Olympic quads, narrowly missing selection in 2012 and 2016. He came closest to selection in 2016 just after winning National Championships, (P&G Championships) on the horizontal bar, taking second on the vault, and third on the floor exercise.

Ruggeri considers rings and pommel horse his weak events. He has vaulted a Yurchenko entry to two different tricks: a half turn and double full off or (without turn) to 2-1/2 twists (Shewfelt). His height is 5-8.

== Personal life ==
Ruggeri studied molecular biology at the University of Illinois, with organic chemistry as his favorite class. School was challenging for him because of the difficulty in balancing sports and studies. During college, he was targeting becoming a doctor, but (as of 2013) he considered his options open. His post-gymnastics plans were to craft a career combining sports and chemistry, perhaps nutrition.

Ruggeri is earning a bachelor's degree in nursing from Le Moyne College and Saint Joseph's College of Nursing in Syracuse, NY.

He is openly gay.
