= Tommy Ramos =

Puerto Rican gymnast

- Full name: Tommy Ramos Nin
- Born: April 29, 1986 (age 40) Bayamón, Puerto Rico
- Height: 5 ft 7 in (1.70 m)
- Spouse: Vilmarie Mojica (m. 2017)

Gymnastics career
- Discipline: Men's artistic gymnastics
- Country represented: Puerto Rico; (2002–2016)
- College team: Pennsylvania State
- Retired: August 29, 2016
Medal record
Men's artistic gymnastics
Representing Puerto Rico
Pan American Games
Gold medal – first place	2003 Santo Domingo	Horizontal bar
Gold medal – first place	2007 Rio de Janeiro	Team
Silver medal – second place	2011 Guadalajara	Team
Pan American Championships
Silver medal – second place	2010 Guadalajara	Rings
Silver medal – second place	2013 San Juan	Rings
Central American and Caribbean Games
Gold medal – first place	2010 Mayagüez	Rings
Gold medal – first place	2010 Mayagüez	Team

Tommy Ramos Nin (born April 29, 1986) is a retired Puerto Rican artistic gymnast and former member of the Puerto Rican national team known as the Golden Boys. He participated in the men's rings event at the 2012 Summer Olympics in London where he finished six among eight participants.

== Personal life ==
Ramos married volleyball player Vilmarie Mojica on July 8, 2017, in a ceremony at Casa España in San Juan, Puerto Rico. The couple have a daughter. Previously, he had dated fellow Olympic gymnast Catalina Ponor.

== In popular culture ==
Year	Title	Role	Notes
2018	Exatlón Estados Unidos	Himself	Television gaming; participant
2019	Exatlón Estados Unidos	Himself	Television gaming; trainer

== See also ==
- List of Pennsylvania State University Olympians
