= Jorge Vega =

Guatemalan artistic gymnast (born 1995)

- Full name: Jorge Alfredo Vega López
- Born: 15 July 1995 (age 31) Jocotenango, Sacatepéquez, Guatemala

Gymnastics career
- Discipline: Men's artistic gymnastics
- Country represented: Guatemala; (2013–present)
Medal record
Pan American Games
Gold medal – first place	2015 Toronto	Floor exercise
Silver medal – second place	2019 Lima	Vault
Pan American Championships
Gold medal – first place	2016 Sucre	Floor exercise
Gold medal – first place	2016 Sucre	Vault
Gold medal – first place	2017 Lima	Floor exercise
Gold medal – first place	2026 Rio de Janeiro	Floor exercise
Silver medal – second place	2014 Mississauga	Vault
Silver medal – second place	2025 Panama City	Floor exercise
Bronze medal – third place	2016 Sucre	Parallel bars
Bronze medal – third place	2017 Lima	Vault
Bronze medal – third place	2025 Panama City	Vault
Pan American Sports Festival
Gold medal – first place	2014 Guadalajara	Vault
Central American and Caribbean Games
Gold medal – first place	2014 Veracruz	Floor exercise
Gold medal – first place	2018 Barranquilla	Floor exercise
Gold medal – first place	2023 San Salvador	Floor exercise
Gold medal – first place	2026 Santo Domingo	Floor exercise
Bronze medal – third place	2014 Veracruz	Vault
Bronze medal – third place	2018 Barranquilla	Vault
Bolivarian Games
Gold medal – first place	2017 Santa Marta	Vault
Silver medal – second place	2013 Trujillo	Floor exercise
Silver medal – second place	2017 Santa Marta	Floor exercise
Silver medal – second place	2025 Lima	Vault
Bronze medal – third place	2013 Trujillo	Vault
Bronze medal – third place	2025 Lima	Team
Central American Games
Gold medal – first place	2013 San Jose	Parallel bars
Gold medal – first place	2013 San Jose	High bar
Silver medal – second place	2013 San Jose	Team
Silver medal – second place	2013 San Jose	All-around
Silver medal – second place	2013 San Jose	Floor exercise

Jorge Alfredo Vega López (born 15 July 1995) is a Guatemalan male artistic gymnast, representing his nation at international competitions.

== Gymnastics career ==
Vega competed at world championships, including the 2013 World Artistic Gymnastics Championships in Antwerp, Belgium.

He won Guatemala's first-ever gold medal in gymnastics at the Pan American Games in Toronto, Canada during the 2015 edition of the games.

In 2015, he was awarded the keys to the city in his hometown of Jocotenango, and in 2016 a sports center and a street there were named after him. Vega was awarded the Order of the Legion of the city of Antigua Guatemala in 2017. He was Guatemala's flag bearer at the 2017 Bolivarian Games, the 2018 Central American and Caribbean Games, and the 2019 Pan American Games. In 2021, he and his partner Maria Alejandra Castillo opened a gymnastics club called Gymnastica.
