= Manrique Larduet =

Cuban artistic gymnast

- Full name: Manrique Larduet Bicet
- Nickname: La Maquina
- Born: 10 July 1996 (age 30) Santiago de Cuba, Cuba
- Height: 161 cm (5 ft 3 in)

Gymnastics career
- Discipline: Men's artistic gymnastics
- Country represented: Cuba (2013–2021)
- Training location: Civitavecchia, Italy
- Club: Ginnastica Civitavecchia
- Head coach: Carlos Gil
Medal record
Men's artistic gymnastics
Representing Cuba
World Championships
Silver medal – second place	2015 Glasgow	All-around
Bronze medal – third place	2015 Glasgow	Horizontal bar
Pan American Games
Gold medal – first place	2015 Toronto	Vault
Silver medal – second place	2015 Toronto	All-around
Silver medal – second place	2015 Toronto	Parallel bars
Bronze medal – third place	2015 Toronto	Rings
Pan American Championships
Gold medal – first place	2013 San Juan	Vault
Gold medal – first place	2013 San Juan	Parallel bars
Gold medal – first place	2018 Lima	All-around
Gold medal – first place	2018 Lima	Parallel bars
Silver medal – second place	2013 San Juan	Floor exercise
Silver medal – second place	2014 Mississauga	All-around
Silver medal – second place	2014 Mississauga	Parallel bars
Silver medal – second place	2014 Mississauga	Horizontal bar
Silver medal – second place	2018 Lima	Floor exercise
Silver medal – second place	2018 Lima	Pommel horse
Pan American Sports Festival
Gold medal – first place	2014 Guadalajara	All-around
Gold medal – first place	2014 Guadalajara	Parallel bars
Silver medal – second place	2014 Guadalajara	Floor exercise
Silver medal – second place	2014 Guadalajara	Pommel horse
Silver medal – second place	2014 Guadalajara	Rings
Silver medal – second place	2014 Guadalajara	Vault
Central American and Caribbean Games
Gold medal – first place	2014 Veracruz	All-around
Gold medal – first place	2014 Veracruz	Vault
Gold medal – first place	2018 Barranquilla	All-around
Gold medal – first place	2018 Barranquilla	Rings
Gold medal – first place	2018 Barranquilla	Parallel bars
Silver medal – second place	2014 Veracruz	Floor exercise
Silver medal – second place	2014 Veracruz	Rings
Silver medal – second place	2014 Veracruz	Parallel bars
Silver medal – second place	2014 Veracruz	Horizontal bar
Silver medal – second place	2018 Barranquilla	Team
Silver medal – second place	2018 Barranquilla	Pommel horse
Silver medal – second place	2018 Barranquilla	Vault
Bronze medal – third place	2014 Veracruz	Team
Bronze medal – third place	2018 Barranquilla	Horizontal bar

Manrique Larduet Bicet (born 10 July 1996) is a Cuban artistic gymnast. At the 2015 World Championships, he won the silver medal in the all-around, becoming Cuba's first World all-around medalist. He is also the 2015 World horizontal bar bronze medalist, and he represented Cuba at the 2016 Summer Olympics. He is the 2015 Pan American Games vault champion and all-around silver medalist. He is the 2018 Pan American all-around champion and a two-time Pan American champion on the parallel bars (2013, 2018). At the 2014 Pan American Sports Festival he won medals in every event, including the all-around gold.

Larduet withdrew from the 2020 Summer Olympics due to a dispute with the Cuban Gymnastics Federation, and he now lives and trains in Italy.

== Early life and education ==
Larduet began gymnastics when he was five years old. He moved away from his family to Havana at age nine to train at the National Gymnastics School.

== Gymnastics career ==
=== 2013–2014 ===
At the 2013 Pan American Championships, Larduet won gold on vault and parallel bars and silver on floor exercise behind Diego Hypólito. He won the all-around and parallel bars titles at the 2014 Pan American Sports Festival. He also won silver medals on the floor exercise, pommel horse, rings, and vault. At the 2014 Pan American Championships, he won the all-around silver medal behind Jossimar Calvo. He also won the horizontal bar silver medal behind Calvo and the parallel bars silver medal behind Jorge Hugo Giraldo. Then at the 2014 Central American and Caribbean Games, he won the all-around and vault gold medals. He won four silver medals in the event finals, and the Cuban team won the bronze medal.

=== 2015 ===
For the first time since 2003, Cuba sent gymnasts to the Artistic Gymnastics World Cup series, including Larduet. At the Anadia World Challenge Cup, he won gold medals on the vault, floor exercise, and horizontal bar, and he won silver medals on parallel bars and still rings. He then represented Cuba at the 2015 Pan American Games and won the silver medal in the all-around final behind Sam Mikulak. Then in the event finals, he won gold on vault, silver on parallel bars, and bronze on rings. Cuba also sent Larduet and other gymnasts to the World Artistic Gymnastics Championships for the first time since 2003. Larduet won the silver medal in the all-around behind Japan's Kōhei Uchimura. This marked the first time a Cuban gymnast won a World medal in the all-around competition. He then won the bronze medal in the horizontal bar final behind Uchimura and Danell Leyva. This medal secured his qualification for the 2016 Olympic Games.

=== 2016 ===
Larduet began the Olympic season at the Doha World Cup and won the silver medal on the parallel bars behind Oleg Stepko. Then at the Osijek World Cup, he won another silver medal on the parallel bars, this time behind Emin Garibov. At this competition, he became the first gymnast to perform a double front somersault with a full twist dismount off the parallel bars, and this skill was named after him in the Code of Points. He then represented Cuba at the 2016 Summer Olympics. During the qualification round, he made a major mistake on vault, but he still qualified for the all-around final in 15th place. During the all-around final, he injured his ankle on vault and withdrew from the rest of the event. Despite the injury, he competed in the parallel bars and horizontal bar finals, finishing fifth and sixth, respectively.

=== 2017–2018 ===
Due to the injury sustained at the Olympic Games, Larduet did not resume training until July 2017. He competed at the 2017 World Championships in Montreal. During the qualification round, he finished in first place in the all-around. However, in the all-around final, he finished in fifth place, missing the podium by 0.400. In the event finals, he finished seventh on the floor exercise and fourth on parallel bars.

At the 2018 Guimarães World Challenge Cup, Larduet won gold medals on the rings, vault, and parallel bars. Then at the 2018 Central American and Caribbean Games, he won the all-around title as well as gold medals on rings and parallel bars. He also won silver medals on pommel horse, vault, and with the Cuban team, and he won bronze on the horizontal bar. He also won the all-around title at the 2018 Pan American Championships. In the event finals, he won gold on parallel bars and silver on floor exercise and pommel horse. He then competed at the 2018 World Championships but did not advance into any finals.

=== 2019–2021 ===
In January 2019, Larduet received stem cell treatment for prolonged wrist injuries, and he missed the 2019 Pan American Games as a result. He competed at the 2019 World Championships and qualified for the all-around final, ensuring his qualification for the 2020 Olympic Games. However, he withdrew from the final.

In 2020, Larduet's head coach was suspended by the Cuban Gymnastics Federation. In May 2021, Larduet announced on his Instagram account that he was no longer training and would not compete at the postponed-2020 Summer Olympics. This was confirmed in July when the Cuban Olympic Committee announced its delegation for the Olympic Games without Larduet.

=== 2022–present ===
In 2022, Larduet moved to Italy and began training there. He competed at the 2023 Italian Championships as a guest and received the highest all-around total, but was not eligible for placement as he was competing as a guest.

At the 2025 Italian National Championships, Larduet won the all-around title despite still holding a Cuban World Gymnastics license due to the fact that he had been living and working in Quartu Sant'Elena for numerous years.

== Eponymous skill ==
Larduet has a parallel bars dismount that is named after him in the Code of Points.

Apparatus	Name	Description	Difficulty (Note: Valid for the 2022–2024 Code of Points)	Added to Code of Points
Parallel bars	Larduet	Double salto forward tucked with 1/1 twist	G	2016 Osijek World Cup
