= Arthur Zanetti =

Brazilian artistic gymnast

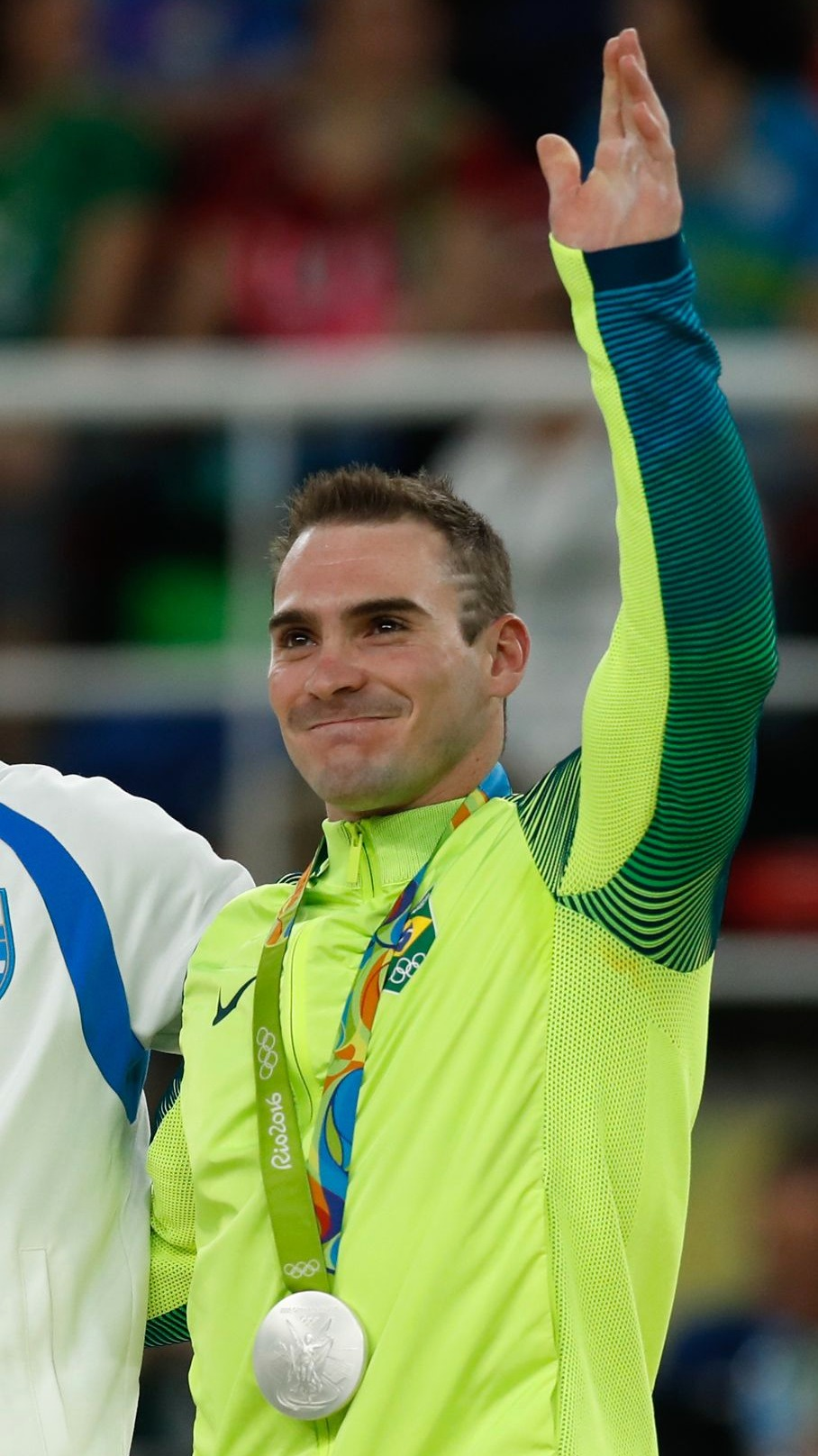
- Zanetti at the 2016 Olympics

Personal information
- Full name: Arthur Nabarrete Zanetti
- Born: 16 April 1990 (age 36) São Caetano do Sul, São Paulo, Brazil
- Height: 1.56 m (5 ft 1 in)

Gymnastics career
- Discipline: Men's artistic gymnastics
- Country represented: Brazil; (2007–2023)
- Club: SERC Santa Maria
- Head coach: Marcos Gotto
- Assistant coach: Andre de Oliveira
- Eponymous skills: Zanetti (Still rings)
- Retired: 12 January 2025
Medal record
Men's artistic gymnastics
Representing Brazil
Event	1st	2nd	3rd
Olympic Games	1	1	0
World Championships	1	3	0
Pan American Games	3	3	0
Pan American Championships	2	1	4
Summer Universiade	2	0	0
Total	9	8	4
Olympic Games
Gold medal – first place	2012 London	Rings
Silver medal – second place	2016 Rio de Janeiro	Rings
World Championships
Gold medal – first place	2013 Antwerp	Rings
Silver medal – second place	2011 Tokyo	Rings
Silver medal – second place	2014 Nanning	Rings
Silver medal – second place	2018 Doha	Rings
Pan American Games
Gold medal – first place	2011 Guadalajara	Team
Gold medal – first place	2015 Toronto	Rings
Gold medal – first place	2019 Lima	Team
Silver medal – second place	2011 Guadalajara	Rings
Silver medal – second place	2015 Toronto	Team
Silver medal – second place	2019 Lima	Rings
Pan American Championships
Gold medal – first place	2014 Mississauga	Rings
Gold medal – first place	2022 Rio de Janeiro	Rings
Silver medal – second place	2022 Rio de Janeiro	Team
Bronze medal – third place	2008 Rosario	Floor exercise
Bronze medal – third place	2008 Rosario	Rings
Bronze medal – third place	2014 Mississauga	Team
Bronze medal – third place	2014 Mississauga	Floor exercise
South American Games
Gold medal – first place	2010 Medellín	Team
Gold medal – first place	2010 Medellín	Rings
Gold medal – first place	2014 Santiago	Rings
Gold medal – first place	2018 Cochabamba	Team
Gold medal – first place	2018 Cochabamba	Rings
Gold medal – first place	2018 Cochabamba	Vault
Silver medal – second place	2014 Santiago	Team
Summer Universiade
Gold medal – first place	2011 Shenzhen	Rings
Gold medal – first place	2013 Kazan	Rings

Arthur Nabarrete Zanetti (born 16 April 1990) is a Brazilian retired artistic gymnast. He won the gold medal on the rings exercise at the 2012 Olympic Games in London, becoming the first Brazilian and Latin American gymnast to win an Olympic medal in history. He also won the gold medal at the 2013 World Championships in Antwerp.

== Gymnastics career ==
=== 2007–2010 ===
Zanetti made his World Championships debut at the 2007 World Championships. He next competed at the 2007 Junior Pan American Championships where he helped Brazil win silver as a team. Individually, he won gold on floor exercise and rings and silver on vault.

Zanetti competed at the 2008 Pan American Championships where he won bronze on floor exercise and rings. He competed at the 2009 World Championships in London. He qualified in eighth for the rings final and placed fourth during the final, scoring 15.325.

At the 2010 South American Games, Zanetti helped Brazil win gold. Individually, he also won gold on rings.

=== 2011 ===
Zanetti won the gold medal on rings at the 2011 Summer Universiade, in Shenzhen, China, with a score of 15.600. It was the first medal for a Brazilian male artistic gymnast in this competition.

He won the silver medal on rings at the 2011 World Championships in Tokyo, Japan. He scored 15.600, finishing behind Chen Yibing of China. With this result, Zanetti qualified to compete at the 2012 Summer Olympics. He was also the first Brazilian to win a medal on rings at a World Gymnastics Championships.

At the 2011 Pan American Games Zanetti won the silver medal on rings behind Brandon Wynn of the United States. He also won the team title, the first male team gold medal for Brazil at the Pan American Games.

=== 2012 ===
At the 2012 Olympic Test Event Zanetti won the gold medal on rings. At the Cottbus World Cup, Zanetti won the silver medal once again behind Chen. At the Osijek Grand Prix and the Maribor World Cup, he won gold.

Zanetti competed at the 2012 Olympic Games in London. He qualified to the rings final in fourth place with a score of 15.616. During the event final, he won the gold medal with a score of 15.900. His gold medal was the first medal for a Brazilian gymnast, and also the first for a Latin American gymnast in any event at the Olympic Games.

=== 2013–2015 ===
Zanetti participated in two events in the 2013 World Cup series – the Doha World Cup and the Anadia World Cup. He was the gold medalist on rings at both competitions. Zanetti defended his title on rings at the 2013 Summer Universiade in Kazan and won the gold medal. On October 5, Zanetti won the gold medal at the 2013 World Championships, in Antwerp, Belgium, with a score of 15,800.

At the 2014 South American Games, Zanetti helped Brazil win the silver medal. Individually, he won gold on rings. At the 2014 Pan American Championships, Zanetti won gold on rings and bronze on floor exercise; additionally, he helped Brazil win bronze as a team. At the 2014 World Championships, Zanetti won silver on rings behind Liu Yang of China.

Zanetti competed at the 2015 Pan American Games where he helped Brazil finish second. Individually, he won gold on rings. At the 2015 World Championships, Zanetti finished ninth on rings during qualification and was the first reserve for the final.

=== 2016–2018 ===
Zanetti competed at the 2016 Olympic Test Event where he won gold on rings. At the 2016 Olympic Games Zanetti won silver on rings behind Eleftherios Petrounias of Greece. He was also part of the Brazilian men's team that finished sixth in the team competition.

At the 2017 World Championships Zanetti finished seventh on rings.

Zanetti competed at the 2018 South American Games where he helped Brazil win gold as a team. Individually, he won gold on rings and vault. At the 2018 World Championships he won silver on rings, once again behind Petrounias.

=== 2019–2023 ===
Zanetti competed at the 2019 World Championships where he finished fifth in the rings final. Nearly all competitions were either canceled or postponed in 2020 due to the global COVID-19 pandemic.

Zanetti competed at the 2020 Olympic Games, held in 2021. He finished eighth on rings during the final.

Zanetti competed at the 2022 Pan American Championships where he helped Brazil finish second as a team. Individually, he won gold on rings. He was initially going to compete at the 2023 World Championships; however, the flu relegated him to being the alternate for the Brazilian team as he could not fully compete.

Awards
Preceded by César Cielo	Brazilian Sportsmen of the Year; 2012	Succeeded by Jorge Zarif
Preceded by Jorge Zarif	Brazilian Sportsmen of the Year; 2014	Succeeded by Isaquias Queiroz
