= Carlos Calvo (gymnast) =

Colombian artistic gymnast (born 1994)

- Full name: Carlos Alberto Calvo
- Born: 13 October 1994 (age 31)

Gymnastics career
- Discipline: Men's artistic gymnastics
- Country represented: Colombia
Medal record
Representing Colombia
Men's artistic gymnastics
Pan American Games
Bronze medal – third place	2015 Toronto	Team
Bronze medal – third place	2019 Lima	Pommel horse

Carlos Alberto Calvo (born 13 October 1994) is a Colombian artistic gymnast.

In 2015, he won the bronze medal in the men's artistic team all-around event at the 2015 Pan American Games held in Toronto, Canada. In 2018, he won three bronze medals at the 2018 Pacific Rim Gymnastics Championships held in Medellín, Colombia.

In 2019, he represented Colombia at the 2019 Pan American Games held in Lima, Peru, and he won the bronze medal in the men's pommel horse event.
