= Sérgio Sasaki =

Brazilian artistic gymnast (born 1992)

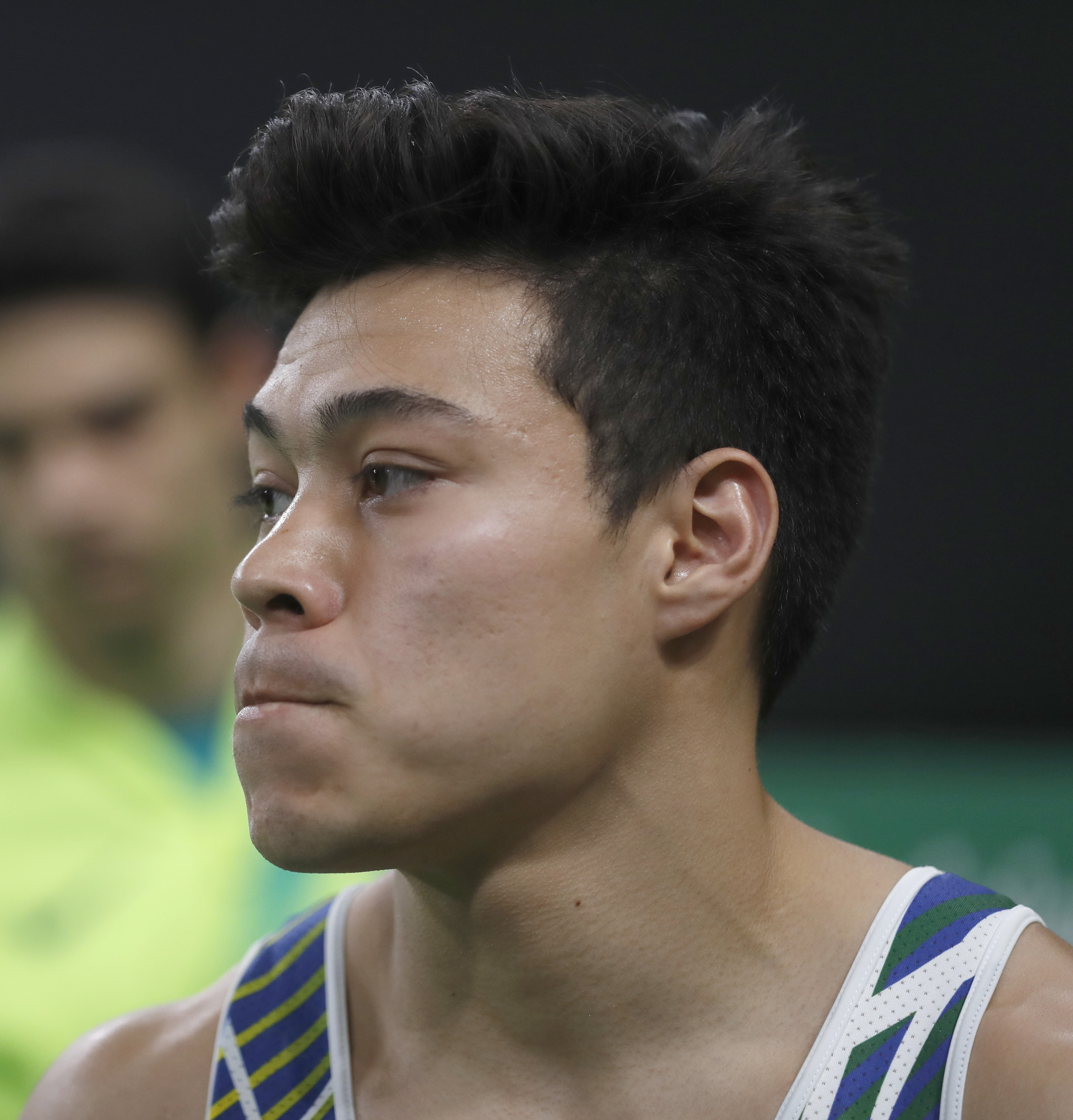
- Sasaki at the 2016 Olympics

Personal information
- Full name: Sérgio Yoshio Sasaki Júnior
- Born: 31 March 1992 (age 34) São Bernardo do Campo, São Paulo, Brazil
- Height: 1.64 m (5 ft 5 in)

Gymnastics career
- Discipline: Men's artistic gymnastics
- Country represented: Brazil (2014–present)
- Club: Vasco da Gama
- Head coach: Renato Alves Pequeno de Araújo
Medal record
Representing Brazil
Pan American Games
Gold medal – first place	2011 Guadalajara	Team
Pan American Championships
Gold medal – first place	2013 San Juan	Pommel horse
Gold medal – first place	2014 Mississauga	Vault
Silver medal – second place	2010 Guadalajara	Team
Silver medal – second place	2010 Guadalajara	Vault
Silver medal – second place	2012 Medellín	Parallel bars
Silver medal – second place	2012 Medellín	Horizontal bar
Silver medal – second place	2014 Mississauga	Horizontal bar
Bronze medal – third place	2013 San Juan	Parallel bars
Bronze medal – third place	2014 Mississauga	Team
South American Games
Gold medal – first place	2010 Medellín	Team
Gold medal – first place	2014 Santiago	Vault
Gold medal – first place	2014 Santiago	Horizontal bar
Silver medal – second place	2010 Medellín	Vault
Silver medal – second place	2014 Santiago	Team
Silver medal – second place	2014 Santiago	All-around

Sérgio Yoshio Sasaki Júnior (born March 31, 1992) is a Brazilian male artistic gymnast. He has collected a career tally of sixteen medals (six gold, eight silver, and two bronze) in major international competitions spanning the Pan American Games, the Pan American Championships, and the South American Games. Sasaki also attended two editions of the Summer Olympic Games (2012 and 2016), as a member of the national team, reaching the final of the men's all-round both times.

He missed the 2015 World Championships due to a bicep injury.

At the 2009 Pan American Junior Championships, he won the floor, vault, and parallel bars events and won bronze in the rings.
