= Jossimar Calvo =

Colombian artistic gymnast (born 1994)

Jossimar Orlando Calvo
- Calvo at the 2018 South American Games

Personal information
- Full name: Jossimar Orlando Calvo Moreno
- Born: 22 July 1994 (age 32) Cúcuta, Colombia
- Height: 1.59 m (5 ft 3 in)

Gymnastics career
- Discipline: Men's artistic gymnastics
- Country represented: Colombia
- Club: Liga Norte de Santander
- Retired: 2025
Medal record
Men's artistic gymnastics
Representing Colombia
Pacific Rim Championships
Gold medal – first place	2014 Richmond	Vault
Silver medal – second place	2014 Richmond	Horizontal bar
Bronze medal – third place	2014 Richmond	Parallel bars
Pan American Games
Gold medal – first place	2011 Guadalajara	All-around
Gold medal – first place	2015 Toronto	Horizontal bar
Gold medal – first place	2015 Toronto	Parallel bars
Gold medal – first place	2015 Toronto	Pommel horse
Silver medal – second place	2011 Guadalajara	Horizontal bar
Bronze medal – third place	2015 Toronto	Team
Bronze medal – third place	2015 Toronto	All-around
Pan American Championships
Gold medal – first place	2013 San Juan	Horizontal bar
Gold medal – first place	2014 Mississauga	All-around
Gold medal – first place	2014 Mississauga	Horizontal bar
Silver medal – second place	2014 Mississauga	Team
Silver medal – second place	2018 Lima	Team
Silver medal – second place	2018 Lima	Parallel bars
Bronze medal – third place	2013 San Juan	Floor exercise
Bronze medal – third place	2021 Rio de Janeiro	Team
Central American and Caribbean Games
Gold medal – first place	2014 Veracruz	Horizontal bar
Gold medal – first place	2014 Veracruz	Parallel bars
Gold medal – first place	2018 Barranquilla	Team
Gold medal – first place	2018 Barranquilla	Horizontal bar
Gold medal – first place	2018 Barranquilla	Pommel horse
Silver medal – second place	2014 Veracruz	Team
Silver medal – second place	2014 Veracruz	All-around
Silver medal – second place	2018 Barranquilla	Floor exercise
Silver medal – second place	2018 Barranquilla	Parallel bars
Bronze medal – third place	2010 Mayagüez	Team
Bronze medal – third place	2018 Barranquilla	Rings
South American Games
Gold medal – first place	2014 Santiago	Team
Gold medal – first place	2014 Santiago	All-around
Gold medal – first place	2018 Cochabamba	All-around
Gold medal – first place	2018 Cochabamba	Parallel bars
Gold medal – first place	2022 Asunción	Parallel bars
Silver medal – second place	2014 Santiago	Parallel bars
Silver medal – second place	2018 Cochabamba	Team
Silver medal – second place	2022 Asunción	Floor exercise
Bronze medal – third place	2014 Santiago	Floor exercise
Bronze medal – third place	2022 Asunción	All-around
Bronze medal – third place	2022 Asunción	Team
South American Championships
Gold medal – first place	2013 Santiago	Team
Gold medal – first place	2013 Santiago	All-around
Gold medal – first place	2013 Santiago	Horizontal bar
Gold medal – first place	2013 Santiago	Parallel bars
Gold medal – first place	2015 Cali	Team
Gold medal – first place	2022 Lima	Horizontal bar
Gold medal – first place	2022 Lima	Parallel bars
Silver medal – second place	2011 Santiago	Team
Silver medal – second place	2013 Santiago	Floor exercise
Silver medal – second place	2015 Cali	Pommel horse
Bronze medal – third place	2022 Lima	All-around
Bolivarian Games
Gold medal – first place	2013 Trujillo	Team
Gold medal – first place	2013 Trujillo	All-around
Gold medal – first place	2013 Trujillo	Floor exercise
Gold medal – first place	2013 Trujillo	Parallel bars
Gold medal – first place	2013 Trujillo	Pommel horse
Gold medal – first place	2017 Santa Marta	Team
Gold medal – first place	2017 Santa Marta	All-around
Gold medal – first place	2017 Santa Marta	Floor exercise
Gold medal – first place	2017 Santa Marta	Parallel bars
Gold medal – first place	2017 Santa Marta	Pommel horse
Silver medal – second place	2013 Trujillo	Vault
Silver medal – second place	2017 Santa Marta	Rings
Bronze medal – third place	2013 Trujillo	Rings
FIG World Cup
Event	1st	2nd	3rd
Apparatus World Cup	0	0	1
World Challenge Cup	10	10	1
Total	10	10	2

Jossimar Orlando Calvo Moreno (born 22 July 1994) is a Colombian former artistic gymnast and current coach. At the 2015 Pan American Games he won three individual gold medals, becoming in the first Colombian to do so. He competed at the 2016 Summer Olympics in Rio de Janeiro. He was the first Colombian gymnast to qualify for an Olympic final, ranking tenth in the All-around event.
