= Caio Souza =

Brazilian artistic gymnast (born 1993)

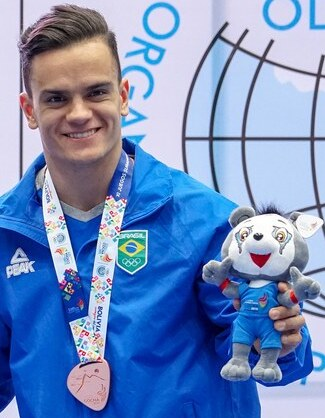
- Souza at the 2018 South American Games

Personal information
- Full name: Caio Campos Souza
- Born: 12 September 1993 (age 33) Volta Redonda, Rio de Janeiro, Brazil

Gymnastics career
- Discipline: Men's artistic gymnastics
- Country represented: Brazil; (2013–present)
Medal record
Men's artistic gymnastics
Representing Brazil
Pan American Games
Gold medal – first place	2019 Lima	Team
Gold medal – first place	2019 Lima	All-around
Silver medal – second place	2015 Toronto	Team
Silver medal – second place	2019 Lima	Parallel bars
Bronze medal – third place	2015 Toronto	Vault
Pan American Championships
Gold medal – first place	2017 Lima	Parallel bars
Gold medal – first place	2018 Lima	Vault
Gold medal – first place	2018 Lima	Horizontal bar
Gold medal – first place	2021 Rio de Janeiro	Team
Gold medal – first place	2021 Rio de Janeiro	All-around
Gold medal – first place	2021 Rio de Janeiro	Rings
Gold medal – first place	2021 Rio de Janeiro	Vault
Gold medal – first place	2021 Rio de Janeiro	Parallel bars
Gold medal – first place	2022 Rio de Janeiro	All-around
Gold medal – first place	2022 Rio de Janeiro	Vault
Gold medal – first place	2024 Santa Marta	Team
Gold medal – first place	2024 Santa Marta	All-around
Gold medal – first place	2024 Santa Marta	Vault
Silver medal – second place	2016 Sucre	Parallel bars
Silver medal – second place	2017 Lima	Pommel horse
Silver medal – second place	2017 Lima	Rings
Silver medal – second place	2022 Rio de Janeiro	Team
Silver medal – second place	2022 Rio de Janeiro	Rings
Silver medal – second place	2022 Rio de Janeiro	Horizontal bar
Silver medal – second place	2024 Santa Marta	Horizontal bar
Bronze medal – third place	2014 Mississauga	Team
Bronze medal – third place	2014 Mississauga	Vault
Bronze medal – third place	2014 Mississauga	Parallel bars
Bronze medal – third place	2017 Lima	Horizontal bar
Bronze medal – third place	2018 Lima	Team
Bronze medal – third place	2022 Rio de Janeiro	Parallel bars
Bronze medal – third place	2024 Santa Marta	Rings
South American Games
Gold medal – first place	2018 Cochabamba	Team
Gold medal – first place	2018 Cochabamba	Horizontal bar
Gold medal – first place	2022 Asunción	Team
Gold medal – first place	2022 Asunción	All-around
Gold medal – first place	2022 Asunción	Vault
Gold medal – first place	2022 Asunción	Horizontal bar
Silver medal – second place	2018 Cochabamba	All-around
Silver medal – second place	2018 Cochabamba	Parallel bars
Silver medal – second place	2022 Asunción	Parallel bars
Bronze medal – third place	2018 Cochabamba	Rings
South American Championships
Gold medal – first place	2012 Rosario	Team
Gold medal – first place	2012 Rosario	Vault
Bronze medal – third place	2012 Rosario	Floor exercise

Caio Campos Souza (born 12 September 1993) is a Brazilian artistic gymnast and part of the national team. He participated in the 2015 World Artistic Gymnastics Championships in Glasgow. He competed at the 2020 Summer Olympics. He is the first Brazilian gymnast to win medals on every apparatus at the FIG World Cups.

== Competitive history ==
Competitive history of Caio Souza
Year	Event	Team	AA	FX	PH	SR	VT	PB	HB
2012	South American Championships	1st place, gold medalist(s)		3rd place, bronze medalist(s)			1st place, gold medalist(s)		
2013	Cottbus World Cup						3rd place, bronze medalist(s)		
2014
2014	Pan American Championships	3rd place, bronze medalist(s)			3rd place, bronze medalist(s)			3rd place, bronze medalist(s)	
2014	World Championships	6							
2015
2015	Pan American Games	2nd place, silver medalist(s)					3rd place, bronze medalist(s)		
2015	Anadia World Cup			3rd place, bronze medalist(s)				6	
2015	Osijek World Cup						7	4	3rd place, bronze medalist(s)
2015	World Championships	8							
2016
2016	Pan American Championships							2nd place, silver medalist(s)	
2016	DTB Team Challenge		5						
2016	São Paulo World Cup				5			5	
2017
2017	Pan American Championships				2nd place, silver medalist(s)	2nd place, silver medalist(s)		1st place, gold medalist(s)	3rd place, bronze medalist(s)
2017	Varna World Cup					5		3rd place, bronze medalist(s)	1st place, gold medalist(s)
2017	World Championships		15						
2018	South American Games	1st place, gold medalist(s)	2nd place, silver medalist(s)					2nd place, silver medalist(s)	1st place, gold medalist(s)
2018	Pan American Championships	3rd place, bronze medalist(s)					1st place, gold medalist(s)		1st place, gold medalist(s)
2018	World Championships	7	13				8		
2019
2019	Pan American Games	1st place, gold medalist(s)	1st place, gold medalist(s)					2nd place, silver medalist(s)	
2019	World Championships		13						
2021
2021	Pan American Championships	1st place, gold medalist(s)	1st place, gold medalist(s)			1st place, gold medalist(s)	1st place, gold medalist(s)	1st place, gold medalist(s)	
2021	Doha World Cup					5		3rd place, bronze medalist(s)	
2021	Olympic Games	R1	17				8		
2021	Brazilian Championships	1st place, gold medalist(s)	1st place, gold medalist(s)	1st place, gold medalist(s)	4	1st place, gold medalist(s)	1st place, gold medalist(s)	1st place, gold medalist(s)	2nd place, silver medalist(s)
2021	World Championships		13					7	
2022	Brazil Trophy			5	2nd place, silver medalist(s)	3rd place, bronze medalist(s)	1st place, gold medalist(s)	1st place, gold medalist(s)	5
2022	Pan American Championships	2nd place, silver medalist(s)	1st place, gold medalist(s)	5		2nd place, silver medalist(s)	1st place, gold medalist(s)	3rd place, bronze medalist(s)	2nd place, silver medalist(s)
2022	Brazilian Championships	1st place, gold medalist(s)	1st place, gold medalist(s)	4		2nd place, silver medalist(s)	2nd place, silver medalist(s)	1st place, gold medalist(s)	1st place, gold medalist(s)
2022	Osijek World Challenge Cup				3rd place, bronze medalist(s)	2nd place, silver medalist(s)	2nd place, silver medalist(s)		3rd place, bronze medalist(s)
2022	Paris World Challenge Cup					8	2nd place, silver medalist(s)	1st place, gold medalist(s)	
2022	South American Games	1st place, gold medalist(s)	1st place, gold medalist(s)		8	4	1st place, gold medalist(s)	2nd place, silver medalist(s)	1st place, gold medalist(s)
2022	World Championships	7	10						R2
2023	Brazil Trophy			2nd place, silver medalist(s)	5	2nd place, silver medalist(s)	3rd place, bronze medalist(s)	2nd place, silver medalist(s)	
2023	Osijek World Challenge Cup					3rd place, bronze medalist(s)	2nd place, silver medalist(s)	3rd place, bronze medalist(s)	1st place, gold medalist(s)
2024	Cairo World Cup					R3			
2024	Cottbus World Cup								R2
2024	Doha World Cup								3rd place, bronze medalist(s)
2024	Pan American Championships	1st place, gold medalist(s)	1st place, gold medalist(s)	6		3rd place, bronze medalist(s)	1st place, gold medalist(s)	4	2nd place, silver medalist(s)
2024	Brazilian Championships	1st place, gold medalist(s)	1st place, gold medalist(s)	3rd place, bronze medalist(s)	7	1st place, gold medalist(s)	4	1st place, gold medalist(s)	1st place, gold medalist(s)
2024	Arthur Gander Memorial		3rd place, bronze medalist(s)						
2024	Swiss Cup	4							
2025	Osijek World Cup							6	
2025	Szombathely World Challenge Cup					4		2nd place, silver medalist(s)	5
2025	World Championships	—N/a	9			6			
2026
2026	Pan American Championships	4						4	
2026	Szombathely World Challenge Cup								
