= José Luis Fuentes =

Venezuelan artistic gymnast (born 1985)

Jose Luis Fuentes
- Full name: José Luis Fuentes Bustamante
- Born: 2 March 1985 (age 41)

Gymnastics career
- Country represented: Venezuela (2008)

José Luis Fuentes Bustamante (born 2 March 1985) is a Venezuelan artistic gymnast, representing his nation at international competitions. He participated at the 2008 Summer Olympics in Beijing, China.
