= Pacific Rim Championships – Women's vault =

Three medals are awarded: gold for first place, silver for second place, and bronze for third place. Tie breakers have not been used in every year. In the event of a tie between two gymnasts, both names are listed, and the following position (second for a tie for first, third for a tie for second) is left empty because a medal was not awarded for that position. If three gymnastics tied for a position, the following two positions are left empty.

== Medalists ==
Year	Location	Gold	Silver	Bronze	Ref.
1998	(Canada) Winnipeg	(United States) Vanessa Atler	(Mexico) Brenda Magana	(Canada) Veronique Leclerc	
2000	(New Zealand) Christchurch	(Mexico) Denisse López	(Australia) Trudy McIntosh	(United States) Vanessa Atler	
2002	(Canada) Vancouver	(United States) Kristal Uzelac	(China) Liu Wei	(Australia) Alexandra Croak	
2004	(United States) Honolulu	(United States) Alicia Sacramone	(Canada) Heather Purnell	(Canada) Melanie Banville	
2006	(United States) Honolulu	(United States) Jana Bieger	(Mexico) Yeny Ibarra	(Canada) Alyssa Brown	
2008	(United States) San Jose	(Russia) Anna Myzdrikova	(Colombia) Jessica Gil	(Mexico) Ericka Garcia	
2010	(Australia) Melbourne	(Canada) Dominique Pegg	(Australia) Emily Little	(Mexico) Alexa Moreno	
2012	(United States) Everett	(Japan) Wakiko Ryu	(Hong Kong) Angel Wong	(Japan) Risa Konishi	
2014	(Canada) Richmond	(Canada) Ellie Black	(New Zealand) Courtney McGregor	(Canada) Maegan Chant	
2016	(United States) Everett	(Canada) Shallon Olsen	(Canada) Brittany Rogers	(New Zealand) Courtney McGregor	
2018	(Colombia) Medellín	(United States) Jordan Chiles	(United States) Grace McCallum	(Canada) Sophie Marois	
2024	(Colombia) Cali	(Costa Rica) Franciny Morales	(New Zealand) Ava Fitzgerald	(Philippines) Ancilla Mari	
