= Pan American Artistic Gymnastics Championships – Women's individual all-around =

The Pan American Gymnastics Championships were first held in 1997.

Three medals are awarded: gold for first place, silver for second place, and bronze for third place.

== Medalists ==
| Year | Location | Gold | Silver | Bronze | Ref |
|---|---|---|---|---|---|
| 1997 | (Colombia) Medellín | (Mexico) Denisse López | (Cuba) Leyanet González | (Brazil) Mariana Gonçalves | |
| 2001 | (Mexico) Cancún | (United States) Tasha Schwikert | (United States) Mohini Bhardwaj | (United States) Tabitha Yim | |
| 2005 | (Brazil) Rio de Janeiro | (United States) Chellsie Memmel | (Brazil) Daniele Hypólito | (Brazil) Laís Souza | |
| 2010 | (Mexico) Guadalajara | (United States) Kyla Ross | (United States) Sabrina Vega | (Venezuela) Jessica López | |
| 2014 | (Canada) Mississauga | (United States) MyKayla Skinner | (Venezuela) Jessica López | (United States) Maggie Nichols | |
| 2018 | (Peru) Lima | (United States) Grace McCallum | (United States) Trinity Thomas | (Brazil) Flávia Saraiva | |
| 2021 | (Brazil) Rio de Janeiro | (Brazil) Rebeca Andrade | (Costa Rica) Luciana Alvarado | (Brazil) Lorrane Oliveira | |
| 2022 | (Brazil) Rio de Janeiro | (Brazil) Flávia Saraiva | (United States) Lexi Zeiss | (United States) Skye Blakely | |
| 2023 | (Colombia) Medellín | (United States) Tiana Sumanasekera | (Mexico) Natalia Escalera | (Canada) Aurélie Tran | |
| 2024 | (Colombia) Santa Marta | (Mexico) Michelle Pineda | (Argentina) Mia Mainardi | (Brazil) Andreza Lima | |
| 2025 | Panama City | (United States) Jayla Hang | (Canada) Lia Monica Fontaine | (United States) Hezly Rivera | |
| 2026 | (Brazil) Rio de Janeiro | (United States) Claire Pease | (United States) Charleigh Bullock | (Brazil) Thaís Fidélis | |

== Medal table ==
| Rank | Nation | Gold | Silver | Bronze | Total |
|---|---|---|---|---|---|
| 1 | United States (USA) | 8 | 5 | 4 | 17 |
| 2 | Brazil (BRA) | 2 | 1 | 6 | 9 |
| 3 | Mexico (MEX) | 2 | 1 | 0 | 3 |
| 4 | Canada (CAN) | 0 | 1 | 1 | 2 |
| 4 | Venezuela (VEN) | 0 | 1 | 1 | 2 |
| 6 | Argentina (ARG) | 0 | 1 | 0 | 1 |
| 6 | Costa Rica (CRC) | 0 | 1 | 0 | 1 |
| 6 | Cuba (CUB) | 0 | 1 | 0 | 1 |
| Totals (8 entries) | | 12 | 12 | 12 | 36 |
