= 2004 Pan American Individual Event Artistic Gymnastics Championships =

Gymnastics tournament in Venezuela

The 2004 Pan American Individual Event Artistic Gymnastics Championships were held in Maracaibo, Venezuela, December 1–05, 2004.

== Medal summary ==
=== Medalists ===
Event	Gold	Silver	Bronze
Men
Floor	Victor Rosa (BRA)	Fernando Fuentes (VEN)	David Sender (USA) Alexander Rodriguez (PUR)
Pommel horse	Jhonny Parra (VEN)	Alexander Rodriguez (PUR)	Mosiah Rodrigues (BRA)
Rings	Regulo Carmona (VEN)	Jonathan Horton (USA) David Sender (USA) David Pacheco (VEN)	—N/a
Vault	Jonathan Horton (USA)	Victor Rosa (BRA)	Pablo Capote (VEN)
Parallel bars	Fernando Fuentes (VEN)	Luis dos Anjos (BRA)	Jhonny Parra (VEN)
Horizontal bar	Carycel Briceño (VEN)	Jhonny Parra (VEN)	Jonathan Horton (USA)
Women
Vault	Alicia Sacramone (USA)	Melanie Sinclair (USA)	Celeste Carnevale (ARG)
Uneven bars	Chellsie Memmel (USA)	Melanie Sinclair (USA)	Jessica López (VEN)
Balance beam	Chellsie Memmel (USA)	Natasha Kelley (USA)	Celeste Carnevale (ARG)
Floor	Alicia Sacramone (USA)	Melanie Sinclair (USA)	Thais Cevada (BRA)

== Men's results ==
=== Floor exercise ===
Rank	Gymnast	Total
1st place, gold medalist(s)	(Brazil) Victor Rosa	9.475
2nd place, silver medalist(s)	(Venezuela) Fernando Fuentes	9.587
3rd place, bronze medalist(s)	(United States) David Sender	8.712
3rd place, bronze medalist(s)	(Puerto Rico) Alexander Rodriguez	8.712
5	(Peru) Mario Berríos	8.525
6	(Mexico) Diego Mercado	8.487
7	(Ecuador) Francisco Saquicela	8.037
8	(Venezuela) Pablo Capote	7.787

=== Pommel horse ===
Rank	Gymnast	Total
1st place, gold medalist(s)	(Venezuela) Jhonny Parra	9.450
2nd place, silver medalist(s)	(Puerto Rico) Alexander Rodriguez	9.425
3rd place, bronze medalist(s)	(Brazil) Mosiah Rodrigues	9.387
4	(Puerto Rico) Joseph Rodriguez	8.625
5	(Venezuela) Carycel Briceño	8.450
6	(Mexico) Diego Mercado	8.150
6	(Mexico) Miguel Monreal	8.150
8	(Brazil) Bruno Martins	6.625

=== Rings ===
Rank	Gymnast	Total
1st place, gold medalist(s)	(Venezuela) Regulo Carmona	9.575
2nd place, silver medalist(s)	(United States) Jonathan Horton	9.400
2nd place, silver medalist(s)	(United States) David Sender	9.400
2nd place, silver medalist(s)	(Venezuela) David Pacheco	9.400
5	(Puerto Rico) Joseph Rodriguez	8.425
6	(Brazil) Luiz Anjos	8.337
7	(Brazil) Bruno Martins	8.125

=== Vault ===
Rank	Gymnast	Total
1st place, gold medalist(s)	(United States) Jonathan Horton	9.368
2nd place, silver medalist(s)	(Brazil) Victor Rosa	9.337
3rd place, bronze medalist(s)	(Venezuela) Pablo Capote	9.318
4	(United States) David Sender	9.293
5	(Venezuela) Fernando Fuentes	9.124
6	(Peru) Mario Berríos	9.050
7	(Brazil) Bruno Martins	8.875
8	(Puerto Rico) Alexander Rodriguez	8.649

=== Parallel bars ===
Rank	Gymnast	Total
1st place, gold medalist(s)	(Venezuela) Fernando Fuentes	9.062
2nd place, silver medalist(s)	(Brazil) Luiz Anjos	8.875
3rd place, bronze medalist(s)	(Venezuela) Jhonny Parra	8.775
4	(Brazil) Mosiah Rodrigues	8.300
5	(Mexico) Diego Mercado	7.675
6	(Puerto Rico) Joseph Rodriguez	7.250
7	(Ecuador) Carlos Jara	7.100
8	(Ecuador) Jorge Portalanza	6.400

=== Horizontal bar ===
Rank	Gymnast	Total
1st place, gold medalist(s)	(Venezuela) Carycer Briceño	9.562
2nd place, silver medalist(s)	(Venezuela) Jhonny Parra	9.425
3rd place, bronze medalist(s)	(United States) Jonathan Horton	9.362
4	(Brazil) Mosiah Rodrigues	9.100
5	(Brazil) Victor Rosa	8.625
6	(Puerto Rico) Joseph Rodriguez	8.450
6	(Mexico) Miguel Monreal	8.450
8	(Puerto Rico) Alexander Rodriguez	7.800

== Women's results ==
=== Vault ===
Rank	Gymnast	Total
1st place, gold medalist(s)	(United States) Alicia Sacramone	9.462
2nd place, silver medalist(s)	(United States) Melanie Sinclair	9.587
3rd place, bronze medalist(s)	(Argentina) Celeste Carnevale	9.262
4	(Argentina) Sol Poliandri	8.906
5	(Brazil) Bruna da Costa	8.787
6	(Mexico) Yeny Ibarra	8.781
7	(Ecuador) Grace Coronado	8.506
8	(Puerto Rico) Leysha Lopez	8.087

=== Uneven bars ===
Rank	Gymnast	Total
1st place, gold medalist(s)	(United States) Chellsie Memmel	9.600
2nd place, silver medalist(s)	(United States) Melanie Sinclair	9.537
3rd place, bronze medalist(s)	(Venezuela) Jessica López	8.875
4	(Brazil) Bruna da Costa	8.825
5	(Mexico) Yeny Ibarra	8.387
6	(Brazil) Thais Ceveda	8.112
7	(Venezuela) Fanny Briceño	7.950
8	(Argentina) Celeste Carnevale	7.937

=== Balance beam ===
Rank	Gymnast	Total
1st place, gold medalist(s)	(United States) Chellsie Memmel	9.637
2nd place, silver medalist(s)	(United States) Natasha Kelley	9.487
3rd place, bronze medalist(s)	(Argentina) Celeste Carnevale	9.237
4	(Mexico) Iyérida Mogollon	8.762
5	(Venezuela) Jessica López	8.337
6	(Venezuela) Maciel Peña	8.287
7	(Brazil) Thais Ceveda	8.162
8	(Brazil) Bruna Da Costa	7.687

=== Floor exercise ===
Rank	Gymnast	Total
1st place, gold medalist(s)	(United States) Alicia Sacramone	9.472
2nd place, silver medalist(s)	(United States) Melanie Sinclair	9.387
3rd place, bronze medalist(s)	(Brazil) Thais Ceveda	8.962
4	(Brazil) Bruna da Costa	8.650
5	(Venezuela) Maciel Peña	8.462
6	(Venezuela) Yarimar Medina	8.062
7	(Argentina) Aylen Gonzalez	8.050
8	(Mexico) Ana Balboa	7.987

== Medal table ==
Rank	Nation	Gold	Silver	Bronze	Total
1	United States (USA)	5	6	2	13
2	Venezuela (VEN)	4	3	3	10
3	Brazil (BRA)	1	2	2	5
4	Puerto Rico (PUR)	0	1	1	2
5	Argentina (ARG)	0	0	2	2
Totals (5 entries)		10	12	10	32
