= Michelle Salzano =

Brazilian rhythmic gymnast

- Full name: Michelle Bressanini Salzano

Gymnastics career
- Discipline: Rhythmic gymnastics
- Country represented: Brazil (1999-?)
- Retired: yes
Medal record
Rhythmic gymnastics
Representing Brazil
Pan American Games
Gold medal – first place	1999 Winnipeg	Group all-Around

Michelle Bressanini Salzano (born 1983-1984) is a retired Brazilian rhythmic gymnast and coach who represented Brazil internationally.

== Biography ==
Salzano took up the sport at the age of four in São Paulo, and at eight she was invited to train in Londrina, the home city of the Brazilian rhythmic gymnastics team.

As a member of the national group she won an historical gold medal at the 1999 Pan American Games in Winnipeg, the first ever in that competition for Brazil, along Camila Ferezin, Dayane Camilo, Flávia Faria, Juliana Coradine and Alessandra Ferezin. This result assured them a spot at the following year Olympics.

After ending her career, she became a referee in the sport. As of 2023 she trains athletes at Club Sport Marítimo, in Madeira.
