= Gymnastics at the 2003 Pan American Games =

- Gymnastics pictograms
- Venue: Pabellón de Gimnasia
- Start date: August 2, 2003
- End date: August 5, 2003
- No. of events: 22 (8 men, 14 women)
- Competitors: 164 from 15 nations

This page shows the results of the Gymnastics Competition at the 2003 Pan American Games, held from August 2 to August 5 in Santo Domingo, Dominican Republic.

== Medal summary ==
=== Medal table ===
Place	Nation	Gold medal	Silver medal	Bronze medal	Total
1	United States	10	6	5	21
2	Cuba	7	4	2	13
3	Brazil	3	5	6	14
4	Canada	1	5	3	9
5	Puerto Rico	1	1	0	2
6	Mexico	0	1	2	3
7	Venezuela	0	1	0	1
8	Argentina	0	0	2	2
8	Colombia	0	0	2	2
Total		22	23	22	67

=== Artistic gymnastics ===
==== Men ====
Games	Gold	Silver	Bronze
Team all-around	Cuba; Michael Brito; Abel Driggs; Lazaro Lamelas; Eric López; Yoslani Mendoza; Charles León Tamayo	Brazil; Vitor Camargo; Michel Conceição; Diego Hypólito; Danilo Nogueira; Mosiah Rodrigues; Victor Rosa	United States; David Durante; Daniel Gill; Jonathan Horton; Sho Nakamori; David Sender; Clayton Strother
Individual all-around	Erick López; Cuba	David Durante; United States	Giovanni Quintero; Colombia
Floor exercise	Brandon O'Neill; Canada	Michel Conceição; Brazil Clayton Strother; United States	—N/a
Pommel horse	Eric López; Cuba	Luis Vargas; Puerto Rico	Mosiah Rodrigues; Brazil
Pommel horse	Eric López; Cuba	Luis Vargas; Puerto Rico	Clayton Strother; United States
Rings	Eric López; Cuba	Regulo Carmona; Venezuela	Abel Driggs; Cuba
Vault	Eric López; Cuba	Diego Hypólito; Brazil	Michel Conceição; Brazil
Parallel bars	Eric López; Cuba	Abel Driggs; Cuba	Jorge Giraldo; Colombia
Horizontal bar	Tomy Ramos; Puerto Rico	Michael Brito; Cuba	Mosiah Rodrigues; Brazil

==== Women ====
Games	Gold	Silver	Bronze
Team all-around	United States; Allyse Ishino; Nastia Liukin; Courtney McCool; Chellsie Memmel; Marcia Newby; Tia Orlando	Canada; Melanie Banville; Gael Mackie; Heather Purnell; Richelle Simpson; Kylie Stone; Lydia Williams	Brazil; Camila Comin; Daniele Hypólito; Caroline Molinari; Ana Paula Rodrigues; Daiane Dos Santos; Laís Souza
Individual all-around	Chellsie Memmel; United States	Nastia Liukin; United States	Daniele Hypólito; Brazil
Vault	Leyanet González; Cuba	Courtney McCool; United States	Brenda Magaña; Mexico
Uneven bars	Chellsie Memmel; United States	Daniele Hypólito; Brazil	Nastia Liukin; United States
Balance beam	Nastia Liukin; United States	Daniele Hypólito; Brazil	Chellsie Memmel; United States
Floor exercise	Tia Orlando; United States	Brenda Magaña; Mexico	Nastia Liukin; United States

== Artistic gymnastics ==
=== Men's competition ===
==== All-around ====
RANK	FINAL RANKING	SCORE
Gold medal	Erick López (CUB)	56.400
Silver medal	David Durante (USA)	54.625
Bronze medal	Giovanni Quintero (COL)	54.250
4.	Jonathan Horton (USA)	54.250
5.	Luis Vargas (PUR)	54.250
6.	Daniel Gill (USA)	54.125
7.	Charles León Tamayo (CUB)	53.975
8.	Caricel Briceño (VEN)	53.275
9.	Danilo Nogueira (BRA)	52.375
10.	Mosiah Rodrigues (BRA)	52.200

==== Floor exercise ====
RANK	FINAL RANKING	SCORE
Gold medal	Brandon O'Neill (CAN)	9.400
Silver medal	Michel Conceição (BRA)	9.375
Silver medal	Clayton Strother (USA)	9.375
4.	Diego Hypólito (BRA)	9.350
5.	Diego Lizardi (PUR)	9.175
6.	Julio García (MEX)	9.125
7.	Eric Pedercini (ARG)	8.900
8.	David Durante (USA)	8.162

==== Parallel bars ====
RANK	FINAL RANKING	SCORE
Gold medal	Eric López (CUB)	9.650
Silver medal	Abel Driggs (CUB)	9.450
Bronze medal	Jorge Giraldo (COL)	9.400
4.	Michel Conceição (BRA)	9.150
5.	David Durante (USA)	9.112
6.	Danilo Nogueira (BRA)	8.975
7.	Rhett Stinson (CAN)	8.825
8.	Lucas Chiarlo (ARG)	8.125

==== Pommel horse ====
RANK	FINAL RANKING	SCORE
Gold medal	Eric López (CUB)	9.750
Silver medal	Luis Vargas (PUR)	9.587
Bronze medal	Mosiah Rodrigues (BRA)	9.450
Bronze medal	Clayton Strother (USA)	9.450
5.	Danilo Nogueira (BRA)	9.437
6.	Caricel Briceño (VEN)	9.237
7.	José Fuentes (VEN)	8.912
8.	David Durante (USA)	8.675

==== Rings ====
RANK	FINAL RANKING	SCORE
Gold medal	Eric López (CUB)	9.700
Silver medal	Regulo Carmona (VEN)	9.675
Bronze medal	Abel Driggs (CUB)	9.525
4.	David Pacheco (VEN)	9.512
5.	Diego Lizardi (PUR)	9.487
6.	Juan Colón (PUR)	9.437
7.	Manuel Aleman (MEX)	8.850
8.	Martín Passalenti (ARG)	8.800

==== Horizontal bar ====
RANK	FINAL RANKING	SCORE
Gold medal	Tomy Ramos (PUR)	9.550
Silver medal	Michael Brito (CUB)	9.475
Bronze medal	Mosiah Rodrigues (BRA)	9.450
4.	Caricel Briceño (VEN)	9.300
5.	Rhett Stinson (CAN)	9.287
6.	Jorge Giraldo (COL)	9.275
7.	Johnny Parra (VEN)	9.112
8.	Lazaro Lamelas (CUB)	9.012

==== Vault ====
RANK	FINAL RANKING	SCORE
Gold medal	Eric López (CUB)	9.456
Silver medal	Diego Hypólito (BRA)	9.443
Bronze medal	Michel Conceição (BRA)	9.393
4.	Abel Driggs (CUB)	9.374
5.	José de la Cruz (DOM)	9.362
6.	Brandon O'Neill (CAN)	9.356
7.	Daniel Gill (USA)	9.224
8.	Julio García (MEX)	9.218

==== Team ====
RANK	FINAL RANKING	SCORE
Gold medal	Cuba; Eric López; Charles León Tamayo; Abel Driggs; Michael Brito; Lazaro Lamelas; Yoslani Mendoza	221.475
Silver medal	Brazil; Danilo Nogueira; Diego Hypólito; Michel Conceição; Mosiah Rodrigues; Victor Rosa; Vitor Camargo	216.375
Bronze medal	United States; David Durante; Daniel Gill; Jonathan Horton; Sho Nakamori; David Sender; Clayton Strother	215.925
4.	Venezuela	212.775
5.	Puerto Rico	212.225
6.	Argentina	206.950
7.	Canada	206.625
8.	Dominican Republic	180.975

=== Women's competition ===
==== All-around ====
RANK	FINAL RANKING	VT	UB	BB	FX	Total
Gold medal	Chellsie Memmel (USA)	9.275	9.625	9.362	9.700	37.962
Silver medal	Nastia Liukin (USA)	9.250	9.462	9.637	9.525	37.874
Bronze medal	Daniele Hypólito (BRA)	9.200	9.487	9.337	9.125	37.149
4.	Allyse Ishino (USA)	9.125	9.375	9.012	0.137	36.649
5.	Melanie Banville (CAN)	9.150	9.425	8.887	9.175	36.637
6.	Lydia Williams (CAN)	9.125	9.050	8.925	9.275	36.375
7.	Leyanet González (CUB)	9.362	8.612	8.787	9.125	35.886
8.	Camila Comin (BRA)	9.175	9.275	8.175	9.122	35.737
9.	Caroline Molinari (BRA)	8.987	9.387	8.087	9.137	35.598
10.	Brenda Magaña (MEX)	9.250	8.525	8.312	9.112	35.199
11.	Heather Purnell (CAN)	9.212	8.200	8.437	9.025	34.874
12.	Monica la Rosa (CUB)	8.600	8.887	8.462	8.700	34.649
13.	Laura Moreno (MEX)	9.212	8.725	7.812	8.500	34.249
14.	Lyerida Mogollón (MEX)	9.112	7.975	8.650	8.462	34.199
15.	Yaldellin Rojas (CUB)	8.575	8.675	7.875	8.450	33.575
16.	Gabriela Parigi (ARG)	8.450	8.875	8.400	7.750	33.475
17.	Daniela Conde (ARG)	8.987	8.537	7.362	8.225	33.411
18.	Melina Sirolli (ARG)	8.975	8.400	7.662	7.962	32.999
19.	Leidy Blanco (COL)	8.862	8.437	7.237	8.450	32.986
20.	Fanny Briceño (VEN)	8.537	8.125	8.437	7.625	32.724
21.	Jessica López (VEN)	8.387	8.412	7.587	7.912	32.298
22.	Bibiana Vélez (COL)	8.775	7.500	7.175	8.500	31.950
23.	Natalie Berrios (PUR)	8.475	7.237	7.387	8.250	31.349
24.	Martina Castro (CHI)	8.800	6.375	7.612	8.212	30.999

==== Floor exercise ====
RANK	FINAL RANKING	SCORE
Gold medal	Tia Orlando (USA)	9.587
Silver medal	Brenda Magaña (MEX)	9.450
Bronze medal	Nastia Liukin (USA)	9.300
4.	Camila Comin (BRA)	9.262
5.	Heather Purnell (CAN)	9.237
6.	Richelle Simpson (CAN)	9.225
7.	Ana Paula Rodrigues (BRA)	9.187
8.	Leyanet González (CUB)	8.987

==== Uneven bars ====
RANK	FINAL RANKING	SCORE
Gold medal	Chellsie Memmel (USA)	9.575
Silver medal	Daniele Hypólito (BRA)	9.475
Bronze medal	Nastia Liukin (USA)	9.425
4.	Ana Paula Rodrigues (BRA)	9.400
5.	Melanie Banville (CAN)	9.150
6.	Lydia Williams (CAN)	8.975
7.	Jessica López (VEN)	8.775
8.	Celeste Carnevale (ARG)	8.425

==== Balance beam ====
RANK	FINAL RANKING	SCORE
Gold medal	Nastia Liukin (USA)	9.550
Silver medal	Daniele Hypólito (BRA)	9.537
Bronze medal	Chellsie Memmel (USA)	9.462
4.	Ana Paula Rodrigues (BRA)	8.962
5.	Melanie Banville (CAN)	8.875
6.	Lyerida Mogollón (MEX)	8.425
7.	Leyanet González (CUB)	8.300
8.	Lydia Williams (CAN)	7.625

==== Vault ====
- Held on 2003-08-05

RANK	FINAL RANKING	SCORE
Gold medal	Leyanet González (CUB)	9.512
Silver medal	Courtney McCool (USA)	9.343
Bronze medal	Brenda Magaña (MEX)	9.293
4.	Laís Souza (BRA)	9.287
5.	Heather Purnell (CAN)	9.243
6.	Janerky de la Peña (CUB)	9.231
7.	Daiane dos Santos (BRA)	9.206
8.	Melanie Banville (CAN)	9.187

==== Team ====
- Held on 2003-08-02

RANK	FINAL RANKING	SCORE
Gold medal	United States; Nastia Liukin; Courtney McCool; Tia Orlando; Chellsie Memmel; Marcia Newby; Allyse Ishino	148.982
Silver medal	Canada; Melanie Banville; Lydia Williams; Heather Purnell; Richelle Simpson; Gael Mackie; Kylie Stone	144.347
Bronze medal	Brazil; Ana Paula Rodrigues; Camila Comin; Caroline Molinari; Daiane dos Santos; Daniele Hypólito; Laís Souza	143.732
4.	Cuba	138.282
5.	Mexico	137.120
6.	Argentina	131.283
7.	Venezuela	129.847
8.	Puerto Rico	121.296
9.	Dominican Republic	109.296

== Rhythmic gymnastics ==
=== Women's competition ===
==== Individual all-around ====
RANK	FINAL RANKING	SCORE
Gold medal	Mary Sanders (USA)	100.450
Silver medal	Olga Karmansky (USA)	88.305
Bronze medal	Anahi Sosa (ARG)	87.675

==== Hoop ====
RANK	FINAL RANKING	SCORE
Gold medal	Mary Sanders (USA)	24.750
Silver medal	Alexandra Orlando (CAN)	24.350
Bronze medal	Anahi Sosa (ARG)	23.600
4.	Tayanne Mantovaneli (BRA)	23.000
5.	Cynthia Valdez (MEX)	22.975
6.	Larissa Barata (BRA)	22.250
7.	Olga Karmansky (USA)	21.675
8.	Antonella Yacobelli (ARG)	21.100

==== Ball ====
RANK	FINAL RANKING	SCORE
Gold medal	Mary Sanders (USA)	24.300
Silver medal	Olga Karmansky (USA)	23.800
Bronze medal	Alexandra Orlando (CAN)	21.350
4.	Anahi Sosa (ARG)	20.250
5.	Larissa Barata (BRA)	20.025
6.	Cynthia Valdez (MEX)	19.975
7.	Catherine Valdez (VEN)	18.250
8.	Tayanne Mantovaneli (BRA)	17.900

==== Clubs ====
RANK	FINAL RANKING	SCORE
Gold medal	Mary Sanders (USA)	25.025
Silver medal	Alexandra Orlando (CAN)	23.625
Bronze medal	Tayanne Mantovaneli (BRA)	23.325
4.	Olga Karmansky (USA)	22.750
4.	Anahi Sosa (ARG)	22.750
6.	Larissa Barata (BRA)	22.700
7.	Cynthia Valdez (MEX)	22.600
8.	Antonella Yacobelli (ARG)	21.950

==== Ribbon ====
RANK	FINAL RANKING	SCORE
Gold medal	Mary Sanders (USA)	24.975
Silver medal	Alexandra Orlando (CAN)	23.550
Bronze medal	Cynthia Valdez (MEX)	23.000
4.	Anahi Sosa (ARG)	22.725
5.	Olga Karmansky (USA)	21.925
6.	Tayanne Mantovaneli (BRA)	21.050
7.	Antonella Yacobelli (ARG)	19.925
8.	Yenly Figuereddo (CUB)	19.000

==== Group all-around ====
RANK	FINAL RANKING	SCORE
Gold medal	Brazil	49.650
Silver medal	Canada	41.600
Bronze medal	Cuba	37.300

==== Group ribbon ====
RANK	FINAL RANKING	SCORE
Gold medal	Brazil	25.300
Silver medal	Cuba	18.400
Bronze medal	Canada	17.250
4.	Venezuela	16.300
5.	Chile	12.500
6.	Dominican Republic	9.800

==== Group hoop-ball ====
RANK	FINAL RANKING	SCORE
Gold medal	Brazil	23.250
Silver medal	Cuba	19.900
Bronze medal	Canada	18.450
4.	Chile	16.950
5.	Venezuela	16.850
6.	Dominican Republic	8.950

== See also ==
- Pan American Gymnastics Championships
- South American Gymnastics Championships
- Gymnastics at the 2004 Summer Olympics
