= Ana Maria Maciel =

Brazilian rhythmic gymnast

- Full name: Ana Maria Teixeira Maciel
- Born: 18 November 1987 (age 38) Londrina, Brazil
- Height: 166 cm (5 ft 5 in)

Gymnastics career
- Discipline: Rhythmic gymnastics
- Country represented: Brazil (2003–2004)
- Club: UNOPAR
- Retired: Yes
Medal record
Rhythmic gymnastics
Representing Brazil
Pan American Games
Gold medal – first place	2003 Santo Domingo	Group all-around
Gold medal – first place	2003 Santo Domingo	5 ribbons
Gold medal – first place	2003 Santo Domingo	3 hoops + 2 balls

Ana Maria Teixeira Maciel (born 18 November 1987) is a retired Brazilian rhythmic gymnast. She is a three time Pan American Games gold medalist.

== Biography ==
Ana Maria took up gymnastics, both artistic and rhythmic, at age seven as her mother enrolled her in both sports in her native Londrina. She later choose to focus on rhythmic as she was afraid of the apparatuses in artistic gymnastics. In 1998 she was the runner up at the Brazilian Championships in the children category.

In 2000 she became the national All-Around champion. Three years later Ana Maria was part of the group that repeated the gold medal in the All-Around at the Pan American Games in Santo Domingo, adding another two in the finals with 5 ribbons and 3 hoops & 2 balls. That year she also competed in the 2003 World Championships in Budapest, where the group was 9th in the All-Around.

Maciel also competed at the 2004 Olympic Games in Athens along Larissa Barata, Dayane Camilo, Fernanda Cavalieri, Tayanne Mantovaneli and Jeniffer Oliveira. They were 7th in qualification, in the final Camilo ended up dropping the ribbon during one of the performances dooming the group to finish 8th.

Ana Maria retired after the Olympics in 2004 at age 17.
