= Fernanda Cavalieri =

Brazilian rhythmic gymnast

- Full name: Fernanda Trotta Cavalieri
- Born: 28 August 1985 (age 41) São Paulo, Brazil
- Height: 162 cm (5 ft 4 in)

Gymnastics career
- Discipline: Rhythmic gymnastics
- Country represented: Brazil (2003–?)
- Club: Clube Esperia
- Retired: Yes
Medal record
Rhythmic gymnastics
Representing Brazil
Pan American Games
Gold medal – first place	2003 Santo Domingo	Group all-around
Gold medal – first place	2003 Santo Domingo	5 ribbons
Gold medal – first place	2003 Santo Domingo	3 hoops + 2 balls

Fernanda Trotta Cavalieri (born 28 August 1985) is a retired Brazilian rhythmic gymnast. She is a three time Pan American Games gold medalist.

== Biography ==
In 2003, Fernanda was part of the group that repeated the gold medal in the All-Around at the Pan American Games in Santo Domingo, adding another two in the finals with 5 ribbons and 3 hoops & 2 balls. During the 2003 Four Continents Gymnastics Championships she won silver with ball as an individual.

She also competed at the 2004 Olympic Games in Athens along Larissa Barata, Dayane Camilo, Ana Maria Maciel, Tayanne Mantovaneli and Jeniffer Oliveira. They were 7th in qualification, in the final Camilo ended up dropping the ribbon during one of the performances dooming the group to finish 8th.
