= Dayane Camilo =

Brazilian rhythmic gymnast

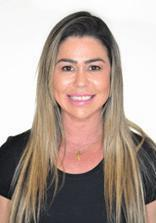
- Full name: Dayane Camilo da Silva
- Born: 15 December 1977 (age 48) Londrina, Brazil
- Height: 160 cm (5 ft 3 in)

Gymnastics career
- Discipline: Rhythmic gymnastics
- Country represented: Brazil (1991–2004)
- Club: Unopar
- Retired: Yes
Medal record
Rhythmic gymnastics
Representing Brazil
Pan American Games
Gold medal – first place	1999 Winnipeg	Group all-around
Gold medal – first place	2003 Santo Domingo	Group all-around
Gold medal – first place	2003 Santo Domingo	5 ribbons
Gold medal – first place	2003 Santo Domingo	3 hoops + 2 balls
Bronze medal – third place	1995 Mar del Plata	Group all-around
Pan American Championships
Gold medal – first place	1997 Medellín	Team
Gold medal – first place	1997 Medellín	Clubs
South American Championships
Gold medal – first place	1996 Santa Cruz de la Sierra	Team
Silver medal – second place	1996 Santa Cruz de la Sierra	All-around

Dayane Camillo da Silva (born 15 December 1977) is a retired Brazilian rhythmic gymnast. She competed at two Olympic Games.

== Biography ==
Dayane took up rhythmic gymnastics at age six encouraged to do so by her mother, who was a physical education teacher. At age 12 she was already competing at the World Championships.

Her first major appearance came in 1995 Pan American Games in Mar del Plata she won the bronze medal in the group All-Around. In 1996 she was part of the Brazilian team that won gold at the South American Championships with Camila Ferezin, where she also won silver in the All-Around. In 1997 she was crowned national champion at the Brazilian Championships. In July of 1997 competed at the Pan American Championships where she won gold in team and with clubs.

As a member of the group she won an historical gold medal at the 1999 Pan American Games in Winnipeg, the first ever in that competition for Brazil and thus earning a group spot for the country for the first time. In 1999 she was 10th at the Four Continents Gymnastics Championships in Jacksonville.

Camilo went on to compete at the 2000 Olympic Games in Sydney in the group competition along Natália Scherer, Flávia de Faria, Alessandra Ferezin, Thalita Nakadomari and Camila Ferezin, they placed 7th in the qualifying round and 8th in the final. The following year she was again the national individual champion.

In 2002 she was selected for the World Championships in New Orleans, the group finished in 8th place. In 2003 she was part of the group that repeated the gold medal in the All-Around at the Pan American Games in Santo Domingo, adding another two in the finals with 5 ribbons and 3 hoops & 2 balls.

She also competed at the 2004 Olympic Games in Athens along Larissa Barata, Fernanda Cavalieri, Ana Maria Maciel, Tayanne Mantovaneli and Jeniffer Oliveira. They were 7th in qualification, in the final Dayane ended up dropping the ribbon during one of the performances dooming the group to finish 8th. She retired after the Olympics.

After her retirement she went to study physical education and became a coach.
