= 2002 Junior Pan American Artistic Gymnastics Championships =

International sports competition

Junior Pan American Artistic Gymnastics Championships
- Location: Santo Domingo, Dominican Republic
- Date: November 4–10, 2002

The 2002 Junior Pan American Artistic Gymnastics Championships was held in Santo Domingo, Dominican Republic, November 4–10, 2002.

== Medal summary ==
Event	Gold	Silver	Bronze
Women
Team	United States; Marcia Newby; Tia Orlando; Nastia Liukin; Melanie Sinclair	Canada; Kylie Stone; Gael Mackie; Lydia Williams; Lisa Pattison	Brazil; Ana Paula Rodrigues; Laís Souza; Thais Cevada; Mariana Oliveira
All Around	Marcia Newby (USA)	Nastia Liukin (USA)	Tia Orlando (USA)
Vault	Marcia Newby (USA)	Kylie Stone (CAN)	Laís Souza (BRA)
Uneven bars	Melanie Sinclair (USA)	Nastia Liukin (USA)	Gael Mackie (CAN)
Balance beam	Melanie Sinclair (USA)	Nastia Liukin (USA)	Kylie Stone (CAN)
Floor exercise	Ana Paula Rodrigues (BRA)	Gael Mackie (CAN) Kylie Stone (CAN)	—N/a
Men
Team	United States; Taqiy Abdullah; Wesley Haagensen; Derek Helsby; Tyler Yamauchi	Brazil; Diego Hypólito; Daniel Yamasita; Victor Rosa; Rodrigo Silva	Canada; David Stern; Nathan Gafuik; Adam Wong; Hugh Smith
All Around	Taqiy Abdullah (USA)	Wesley Haagensen (USA)	Diego Hypólito (BRA)
Floor exercise	Diego Hypólito (BRA)	Unknown	Unknown
Pommel horse	Tyler Yamauchi (USA)	Derek Helsby (USA)	(Colombia) Unknown
Rings	Federico Molinari (ARG)	Tyler Yamauchi (USA)	Adam Wong (CAN)
Vault	Diego Hypólito (BRA)	Tomás González (CHI)	Hugh Smith (CAN)
Parallel bars	Wesley Haagensen (USA)	Taqiy Abdullah (USA)	(Puerto Rico) Unknown
Horizontal bar	Taqiy Abdullah (USA) Wesley Haagensen (USA)	—N/a	Nathan Gafuik (CAN)

== Medal table ==
Rank	Nation	Gold	Silver	Bronze	Total
1	United States	11	7	1	19
2	Brazil	3	1	3	7
3	Argentina	1	0	0	1
4	Canada	0	4	6	10
5	Chile	0	1	0	1
6	Colombia	0	0	1	1
6	Puerto Rico	0	0	1	1
Totals (7 entries)		15	13	12	40
