= 1996 South American Rhythmic Gymnastics Championships =

The 1996 South American Rhythmic Gymnastics Championships were held in Santa Cruz de la Sierra, Bolivia.

== Medalists ==
Event	Gold	Silver	Bronze
Team all-around	Brazil; Camila Ferezin; Dayane Camilo	Argentina; Sandra Re; Alejandra Unsain; Rosana Marinoff; Fernanda Raviña	Venezuela
Individual all-around	Camila Ferezin (BRA)	Dayane Camilo (BRA)	Sandra Re (ARG)
Rope	Alejandra Unsain (ARG)	Unknown	Unknown
Clubs	Alejandra Unsain (ARG)	Camila Ferezin (BRA)	Unknown
Ball	Camila Ferezin (BRA)	Sandra Re (ARG)	Unknown
Ribbon	Unknown	Alejandra Unsain (ARG)	Sandra Re (ARG) Camila Ferezin (BRA)
