= Thalita Nakadomari =

Brazilian rhythmic gymnast

Thalita Santos
- Full name: Thalita Santos Nakadomari
- Born: 11 May 1985 (age 41) Londrina, Brazil
- Height: 154 cm (5 ft 1 in)

Gymnastics career
- Discipline: Rhythmic gymnastics
- Country represented: Brazil; (1999–2004)
- Retired: Yes
Medal record
Rhythmic gymnastics
Representing Brazil
Pan American Games
Gold medal – first place	2003 Santo Domingo	Group all-around
Gold medal – first place	2003 Santo Domingo	5 ribbons
Gold medal – first place	2003 Santo Domingo	3 hoops + 2 balls

Thalita Santos Nakadomari (born 11 May 1985) is a retired Brazilian rhythmic gymnast. She is a three time Pan American Games gold medalist.

== Biography ==
Thalita began practicing gymnastics at the age of seven, after her teacher saw her playing and noticed her abilities for the sport. By age 14 she was part of the Brazilian national team.

She was selected to compete at the 2000 Olympic Games in Sydney in the group competition alongside Natália Scherer, Flávia de Faria, Alessandra Ferezin, Dayane Camilo and Camila Ferezin. They placed 7th in the qualifying round and 8th in the final. This was the first time Brazil's group qualified for the Olympics.

In 2003, she was part of the group that repeated the gold medal in the All-Around at the Pan American Games in Santo Domingo, adding another two in the finals with 5 ribbons and 3 hoops & 2 balls. She competed in the 2003 World Championships in Budapest, where Brazil took 9th place, one position below the spot for the Olympic Games, but the country secured classification based on the technical index.

Although she was a starter in the group, she chose not to compete in the 2004 Summer Olympics in Athens and retired from competitive sport at the age of 18. After leaving competitions, she graduated in physical education.
