= Natália Scherer =

Brazilian rhythmic gymnast

- Full name: Natália Scherer Eidt
- Born: 28 October 1985 (age 40) Santa Cruz do Sul, Brazil
- Height: 160 cm (5 ft 3 in)

Gymnastics career
- Discipline: Rhythmic gymnastics
- Country represented: Brazil (1998–2003)
- Retired: Yes
Medal record
Rhythmic gymnastics
Representing Brazil
Pan American Games
| Gold medal – first place | 2003 Santo Domingo | Group all-around |
| Gold medal – first place | 2003 Santo Domingo | 5 ribbons |
| Gold medal – first place | 2003 Santo Domingo | 3 hoops + 2 balls |

Natália Scherer Eidt (born 28 October 1985) is a retired Brazilian rhythmic gymnast. She is a Pan American medalist and competed at the 2000 Olympics.

== Biography ==
Natália took up gymnastics at the age of five, at school after having seen a demonstration she became interested and started practicing. was called up to the national team for the first time at the age of 12 to participate in the Pan-American Gymnastics Championships held in Houston, in which she won team bronze along Natália Dêntice and Liana Hermes. She was the second gymnast from Rio Grande do Sul to join the Brazilian rhythmic gymnastics team.

In 2000 she was selected to compete Olympic Games in Sydney in the group competition along Flávia de Faria, Camila Ferezin, Alessandra Ferezin, Thalita Nakadomari and Dayane Camilo, they placed 7th in the qualifying round and 8th in the final.

In 2003, she was part of the group that repeated the gold medal in the All-Around at the Pan American Games in Santo Domingo, adding another two in the finals with 5 ribbons and 3 hoops & 2 balls.

Her career ended when she was 19 due to injuries. After leaving competitions she began to dedicate himself to study physical education.
