= Dan Gill =

American artistic gymnast

- Full name: Daniel J. Gill
- Born: July 8, 1982 (age 44) Ontario, Canada
- Height: 5 ft 8 in (173 cm)

Gymnastics career
- Discipline: Men's artistic gymnastics
- Country represented: United States; (2003–2004)
- College team: Stanford Cardinal
- Gym: Team Gattaca; Capital Gymnastics NTC
- Head coach: Thom Glielmi
- Assistant coach: J. D. Reive
- Retired: c. 2004
Medal record
Men's artistic gymnastics
Representing United States
Event	1st	2nd	3rd
Pan American Games	0	0	1
Total	0	0	1
Pan American Games
Bronze medal – third place	2003 Santo Domingo	Team
- Awards: Nissen-Emery Award (2004)

Daniel J. Gill (born July 8, 1982) is a retired American gymnast and current businessman.

Gill was a member of the United States men's national artistic gymnastics team. He represented the United States at the 2003 Pan American Games and won a team bronze medal. He was a gymnast for the Stanford Cardinal men's gymnastics team and won the NCAA championship for the vault at the 2002 NCAA men's gymnastics championships. He was named the 2004 Nissen-Emery Award winner, given annually to the top senior collegiate gymnast.

After gymnastics, Gill co-founded Huddler and served as its chief executive until the company was acquired by Wikia in 2014. He later became chief product officer at Carvana.

In 2025, Gill was inducted into the Stanford Athletics Hall of Fame.

== Early life and education ==
Gill was born on July 8, 1982, in Ontario, Canada, to Thom and Lorna Gill. He was raised in Fairfax, Virginia, and learned gymnastics at Capital Gymnastics National Training Center under coach Carlos Vasquez. He attended Robinson Secondary School before enrolling at Stanford University to pursue gymnastics.

== Gymnastics career ==
Gill was an all-arounder, but weaker in rings and parallel bars than the other events. He attributed this to his relatively tall stature as a gymnast (5-8 or 5-9). Gill was a two-time member of the US Junior National Team.

Gill competed for the Stanford Cardinal men's gymnastics team from 2001 to 2004, where he was a many-time all-American. In 2001 and 2002, he overlapped with David Durante. In 2001, the Cardinal won the NCAAs. At the 2002 NCAA championships, Gill won gold on the vault. In 2004, Gill was the team's captain and won silver in the all-around at championships. That year, Gill won the Nissen-Emery Award, the Heisman of men's gymnastics.

Gill became a member of the U.S. National Team in 2003 and was a part of the bronze medal-winning team at Pan American Games that year. At the 2003 National Championships, he finished 11th all around, sixth on floor exercise, and fifth on vault.

At the 2004 Nationals, Gill won silver on the floor exercise and performed well enough overall to be invited to the Olympic Trials. At Trials, Gill moved from 12th to 7th at one point (threatening for a spot on the team), but a fall on the horizontal bar dashed his chances. He described the Trials as the high point of his athletic career and a more tense meet than the Olympics (because of the dividing line between Olympians and non-Olympians).

Following the Olympic trials and after consultation with multiple doctors, Gill retired from the sport.

== Post-athletic career ==
Gill completed a bachelor's degree in biology and was planning for a career as a physician (perhaps an orthopedic surgeon). However, gymnastics competition had interfered with taking MCATs and Gill eventually decided to go into Silicon Valley startups instead of medicine.

After experience elsewhere, Gill, along with his brother, founded Huddler. The company makes software for online forums and has raised $17 million in venture funding. Gill believes his experience as a gymnast has given him the persistence needed for sales and marketing and that being a team captain translates to leading a startup. Gill served as Huddler's chief executive from 2007 until its acquisition by Wikia in 2014. He has served as Carvana's chief product officer since March 2015.

Recent podcast and media includes an appearance as a guest on Harry Stebbing's 20VC podcast, as well as Metis Strategy's Technovation series.
