= Jeniffer Oliveira =

Brazilian rhythmic gymnast

- Full name: Jeniffer Quirino Oliveira
- Born: 16 March 1989 (age 37) Londrina, Brazil
- Height: 160 cm (5 ft 3 in)

Gymnastics career
- Discipline: Rhythmic gymnastics
- Country represented: Brazil (2003–2004)
- Club: UNOPAR
- Retired: Yes

Jeniffer Quirino Oliveira (born 16 March 1989) is a retired Brazilian rhythmic gymnast.

== Biography ==
Oliveira took up rhythmic gymnastics at age 8, after seeing an advertisement on TV. In November 2003 she was incorporated into the senior national group that was preparing for the Olympics.

Oliveira went on to compete at the 2004 Olympic Games in Athens along with the other group members, Larissa Barata, Dayane Camilo, Fernanda Cavalieri, Tayanne Mantovaneli and Ana Maria Maciel. They were 7th in qualification. In the final, Camilo dropped a ribbon during one of the performances, and the group finished 8th.
