= Flávia de Faria =

Brazilian rhythmic gymnast

- Full name: Flávia Cristina de Faria
- Born: 29 January 1982 (age 44) Brasília, Brazil
- Height: 165 cm (5 ft 5 in)

Gymnastics career
- Discipline: Rhythmic gymnastics
- Country represented: Brazil (1997-2001)
- Retired: yes
Medal record
Rhythmic gymnastics
Representing Brazil
Pan American Games
Gold medal – first place	1999 Winnipeg	Group all-Around

Flávia Cristina de Faria (born 29 January 1982) is a Brazilian former rhythmic gymnast. In her gymnast career, she was a member of the group that won Brazil's first Pan American Games gold medal in 1999, she also competed at the 2000 Summer Olympics.

== Career ==
Born in Brasília, she started rhythmic gymnastics at the age of 10, at Escola Parque. At the age of 15, she was already part of the national group, moving to Londrina, where the national team was located.

As a member of the group she won an historical gold medal at the 1999 Pan American Games in Winnipeg, the first ever in that competition for Brazil.

de Faria went on to compete at the 2000 Olympic Games in Sydney in the group competition along Natália Scherer, Camila Ferezin, Alessandra Ferezin, Thalita Nakadomari and Dayane Camilo, they placed 7th in the qualifying round and 8th in the final. She also competed in 2001 in the 13th Copa dos Continentes, in Curitiba where the group won gold.

After that she retired to focus on her studies. She graduated in physical education and then worked as an administrator.
