= Alessandra Ferezin =

Brazilian rhythmic gymnast

- Full name: Alessandra Ferezin Guidugli
- Born: 7 April 1976 (age 50) Londrina, Brazil
- Height: 170 cm (5 ft 7 in)
- Relatives: Camila Ferezin (sister)

Gymnastics career
- Discipline: Rhythmic gymnastics
- Country represented: Brazil; (?-2000)
- Retired: yes
Medal record
Rhythmic gymnastics
Representing Brazil
Pan American Games
Gold medal – first place	1999 Winnipeg	Group all-around

Alessandra Ferezin Guidugli (born 7 April 1976) is a Brazilian businesswoman and former rhythmic gymnast. She was a gold medalist at the 1999 Pan American Games and represented Brazil at the 2000 Summer Olympics.

== Biography ==
As a child Alessandra and her sister Camila, who was also a successful gymnast and is the current coach of the Brazilian senior group, watched rhythmic gymnastics trainings while waiting for their parents to pick them up from school. She competed until 1995, when she retired because of marriage and pregnancy. She started to compete again in 1997, returning to the Brazilian national team.

As a member of the group she won an historical gold medal at the 1999 Pan American Games in Winnipeg, the first ever in that competition for Brazil, along Camila Ferezin, Dayane Camilo, Flávia Faria, Michelle Salzano and Juliana Coradine. This result assured them a spot at the following year Olympics.

Ferezin went on to compete at the 2000 Olympic Games in Sydney in the group competition along Natália Scherer, Flávia de Faria, Camila Ferezin, Thalita Nakadomari and Dayane Camilo, they placed 7th in the qualifying round and 8th in the final.

After retiring from the sport, she graduated in physical education and worked as a teacher. Later, she became executive director at the company Mary Kay.
