= Yordania Corrales =

Cuban rhythmic gymnast

- Full name: Yordania Corrales Camacho
- Born: 27 June 1977 (age 49) Havana, Cuba
- Spouse: Mario Rodriguez

Gymnastics career
- Discipline: Rhythmic gymnastics
- Country represented: Cuba; (1991-2000)
- Head coach: Xiomara Ameller
- Retired: 2000
Medal record
Representing Cuba
Pan American Games
Gold medal – first place	1991 Havana	Group All-Around
Gold medal – first place	1995 Mar del Plata	All-Around
Gold medal – first place	1995 Mar del Plata	Clubs
Gold medal – first place	1995 Mar del Plata	Rope
Silver medal – second place	1995 Mar del Plata	Team
Bronze medal – third place	1999 Winnipeg	All-Around
Pan American Championships
Gold medal – first place	1997 Medellín	All-Around
Gold medal – first place	1997 Medellín	Rope
Gold medal – first place	1997 Medellín	Hoop
Gold medal – first place	1997 Medellín	Clubs
Bronze medal – third place	1997 Medellín	Ribbon
Bronze medal – third place	1997 Medellín	Team
Central American and Caribbean Games
Gold medal – first place	1998 Maracaibo	All-Around
Gold medal – first place	1998 Maracaibo	Rope
Gold medal – first place	1998 Maracaibo	Hoop
Gold medal – first place	1998 Maracaibo	Clubs

Yordania Corrales (born 27 June 1977) is a former Cuban rhythmic gymnast. She's a multiple Pan American champion.

== Career ==
Yordania took up the sport at age 4 and has been the Cuban national champion from 1992 to 1999. She made her international debut at the 1991 Pan American Games where she won gold as part of the group.

In 1995, she competed at the Pan American Games in Mar del Plata, where she won gold in the All-Around, with clubs and with rope, she was also silver medalist in the teams competition.

Two years later Yordania won All-Around, rope, hoop and clubs' gold as well as bronze with ribbon and in teams along Yasleidis Rodriguez and Yamile Sotolongo at the Pan American Championships in Medellín. In August she conquered the ribbon final at the University Games in Sicily. Later in the same year she was selected for the World Rhythmic Gymnastics Championships in Berlin.

In 1998, she was crowned All-Around, rope, hoop and clubs' champion at the Central American and Caribbean Games in Maracaibo. The following year she won bronze in the All-Around at the 1999 Pan American Games, and she was then selected for the World Championships in Osaka.

Corrales retired in 2000, in recent years she became a trainer in Colombia.
