= Nastia Liukin =

Russian-American 2008 Olympic champion

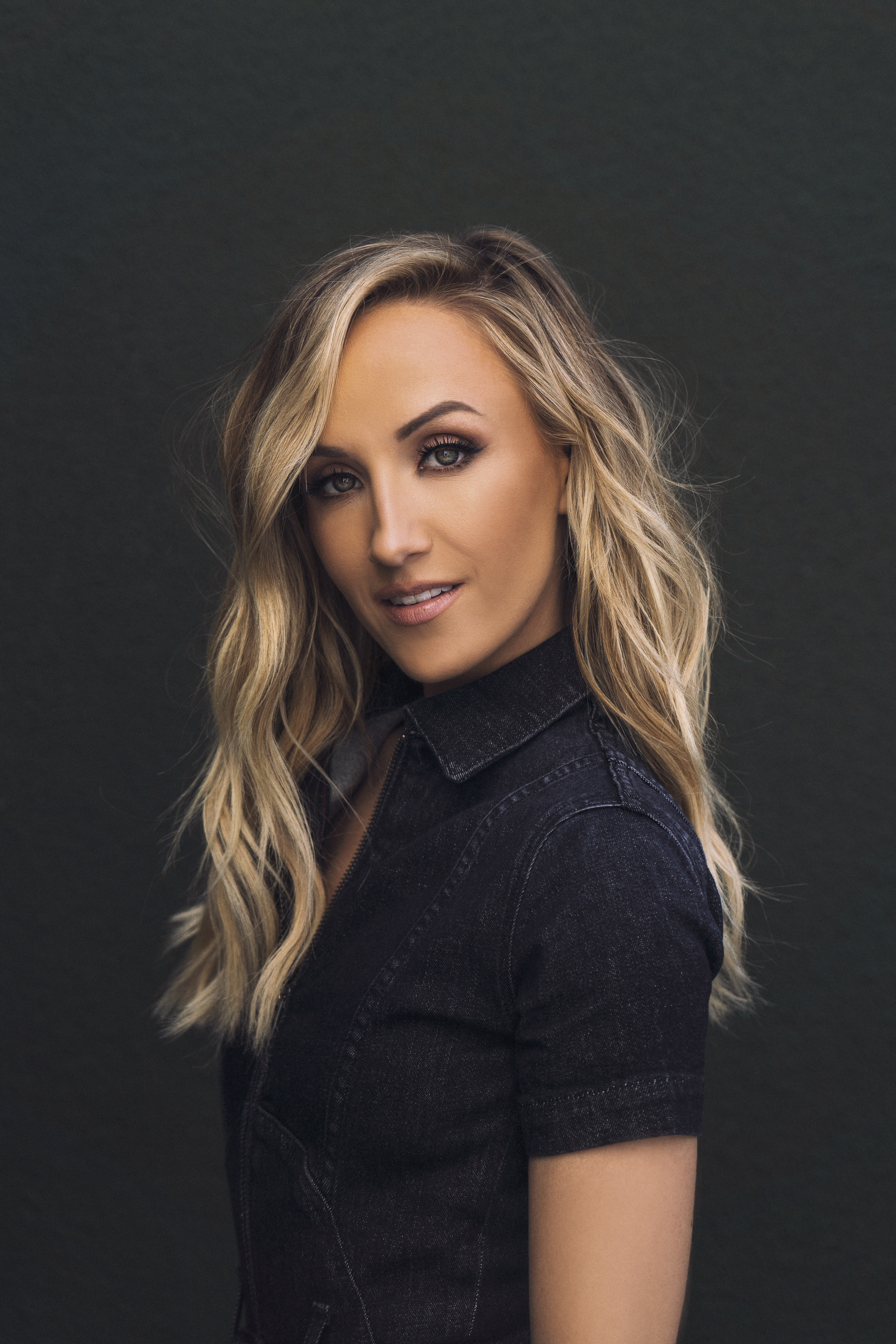
- Liukin in 2020

Personal information
- Full name: Anastasia Liukin
- Nickname: Nastia
- Born: October 30, 1989 (age 37) Moscow, Russian SFSR, Soviet Union
- Height: 5 ft 3 in (160 cm)

Gymnastics career
- Discipline: Women's artistic gymnastics
- Country represented: United States; (2002–2009, 2011–2012)
- Gym: World Olympic Gymnastics Academy
- Head coach: Valeri Liukin
- Former coach: Anna Kotchneva
- Eponymous skills: Liukin (Balance beam)
- Retired: July 2, 2012
Medal record
Women's artistic gymnastics
Representing the United States
Event	1st	2nd	3rd
Olympic Games	1	3	1
World Championships	4	5	0
Pan American Games	3	3	2
Pacific Rim Championships	5	3	0
American Cup	2	0	0
Total	15	14	3
Olympic Games
Gold medal – first place	2008 Beijing	All-around
Silver medal – second place	2008 Beijing	Team
Silver medal – second place	2008 Beijing	Uneven bars
Silver medal – second place	2008 Beijing	Balance beam
Bronze medal – third place	2008 Beijing	Floor exercise
World Championships
Gold medal – first place	2005 Melbourne	Uneven bars
Gold medal – first place	2005 Melbourne	Balance beam
Gold medal – first place	2007 Stuttgart	Team
Gold medal – first place	2007 Stuttgart	Balance beam
Silver medal – second place	2005 Melbourne	All-around
Silver medal – second place	2005 Melbourne	Floor exercise
Silver medal – second place	2006 Aarhus	Team
Silver medal – second place	2006 Aarhus	Uneven bars
Silver medal – second place	2007 Stuttgart	Uneven bars
Pan American Games
Gold medal – first place	2003 Santo Domingo	Team
Gold medal – first place	2003 Santo Domingo	Balance beam
Gold medal – first place	2007 Rio de Janeiro	Team
Silver medal – second place	2003 Santo Domingo	All-around
Silver medal – second place	2007 Rio de Janeiro	Uneven bars
Silver medal – second place	2007 Rio de Janeiro	Balance beam
Bronze medal – third place	2003 Santo Domingo	Uneven bars
Bronze medal – third place	2003 Santo Domingo	Floor exercise
Pacific Rim Championships
Gold medal – first place	2006 Honolulu	Team
Gold medal – first place	2006 Honolulu	Uneven bars
Gold medal – first place	2008 San Jose	Team
Gold medal – first place	2008 San Jose	All-around
Gold medal – first place	2008 San Jose	Balance beam
Silver medal – second place	2008 San Jose	Uneven bars
Silver medal – second place	2006 Honolulu	All-around
Silver medal – second place	2006 Honolulu	Balance beam
FIG World Cup
Event	1st	2nd	3rd
All-Around World Cup	2	0	0
- Education: New York University
- Parents: Valeri Liukin (father); Anna Kotchneva (mother)
- Website: nastialiukin.com

Anastasia "Nastia" Liukin (/ˈljuːkɪn/; Russian: Анастасия Валерьевна Люкина, IPA: [ˈlʲʉkʲɪnə]; born October 30, 1989) is a Russian-American former artistic gymnast. She is the 2008 Olympic all-around champion, a five-time Olympic medalist, the 2005 and 2007 World champion on the balance beam, and the 2005 World champion on the uneven bars. She is also a four-time all-around U.S. national champion, winning twice as a junior and twice as a senior. With nine World Championships medals, seven of them individual, Liukin is tied with Shannon Miller for the third-highest tally of World Championship medals among U.S. gymnasts. Liukin also tied Miller's record (later equaled by Simone Biles) as the American gymnast having won the most medals in a single non-boycotted Olympic Games. In October 2011, Liukin announced that she was returning to gymnastics with the hopes of making a second Olympic team. Liukin did not make the 2012 Olympic team and retired from the sport on July 2, 2012.

Since 2010, Liukin has hosted the Nastia Liukin Cup, an annual gymnastics competition for the top Level 10 gymnasts in the United States. She has worked as a gymnastics commentator for NBC Sports and appeared on season 20 of Dancing with the Stars. She was inducted into the International Gymnastics Hall of Fame in 2018 and into the U.S. Olympic and Paralympic Hall of Fame in 2019.

== Early life and education ==
Liukin was born on October 30, 1989, in Moscow, Russian SFSR, Soviet Union. She is the only child of two former Soviet champion gymnasts: 1988 Summer Olympics double-gold medalist Valeri Liukin and 1987 World clubs champion in rhythmic gymnastics Anna Kotchneva. Her nickname Nastia is a Russian diminutive for Anastasia, and she is fluent in English and Russian.. The family emigrated to the United States when Nastia was two and a half years old, following the breakup of the Soviet Union and easing of travel restrictions, and settled first in New Orleans before moving to Texas. In 1994, Valeri Liukin teamed up with another former Soviet champion athlete, Yevgeny Marchenko, to open the World Olympic Gymnastics Academy (WOGA) in Plano, Texas.

She graduated from Spring Creek Academy, located in Plano, Texas, in the spring of 2007. She enrolled as an international business major at Southern Methodist University in January 2008, and took a leave from classes to concentrate on preparations for the 2008 Olympic Games. She returned to campus in spring 2009, but her travel schedule and professional commitments caused her to withdraw before the end of the semester. In January 2013, Liukin attended New York University, where she studied sports management and psychology, graduating in May 2016.

== Junior gymnastics career ==
Liukin began gymnastics at the age of three because she was "always hanging around in the gym" with her parents, who could not afford a babysitter to look after her while they were working as coaches. Liukin's parents initially did not aspire for their daughter to become a gymnast, knowing the pressure of high-level competition firsthand, but relented when they noticed her aptitude for the sport.

Liukin competed in her first national championships as a junior in 2002, at the age of 12 and a half. In contrast to her WOGA teammates Carly Patterson and Hollie Vise, who finished first and second, respectively, Liukin fell on the uneven bars which rendered her unable to finish the routine. She continued through the rest of the competition and, despite the incomplete bars set, finished 15th, which landed her one of the final spots on the U.S. National Team. She was chosen to compete with the U.S. team at the 2002 Junior Pan American Championships, where she contributed to the team gold medal and placed second on the uneven bars, balance beam, and in the all-around.

In 2003 she won the junior division of the U.S. National Championships, as well as gold medals on three of the four events: uneven bars, balance beam and floor exercise. She was a member of the gold medal-winning U.S. team at the 2003 Pan American Games; she took second place in the all-around behind teammate Chellsie Memmel. She also won the all-around in the junior division of the 2004 Pacific Alliance Championships. She repeated as junior U.S. all-around champion in 2004. Born in 1989, Liukin was ten months too young to compete as a senior in 2004, and thus was not eligible for a place on the U.S. team for the 2004 Olympics in Athens.

== Senior gymnastics career ==
=== 2005–2006 ===
In 2005, Liukin won her first senior national championships and, once again, earned gold medals on the bars and beam. At the 2005 World Championships in Melbourne, she finished second in the all-around behind teammate Chellsie Memmel with a score of 37.823. In event finals, she won the gold on the uneven bars and balance beam and the silver on the floor exercise.

In March 2006, Liukin placed first in the all-around at the American Cup. At the 2006 Pacific Alliance Championships, Liukin tied with teammate Memmel for first in the all-around, won the uneven bars title and a silver medal on beam, and contributed to the U.S. team's gold-medal performance. She competed at the 2006 U.S. Classic as the defending all-around champion, but falls on the uneven bars and floor resulted in a fourth-place finish. However, she scored well on the balance beam and was the only competitor in the meet, junior or senior, to earn a score over 16.00 on this event.

In late August, at the 2006 U.S. National Championships, Liukin successfully defended her all-around, beam and bars titles, becoming a two-time senior national champion. She was named to the U.S. team for the 2006 World Gymnastics Championships in Aarhus, Denmark, and was expected by many to be a strong contender for the all-around title. However, because of an ankle injury, she was only able to compete on the uneven bars. Her bars routine in team finals scored a 15.7 and helped the U.S. team win the silver medal. Liukin also qualified for the event finals on bars, scoring 16.05 to earn a silver medal behind Britain's Beth Tweddle.

=== 2007 ===
Liukin's ankle injury required surgery, and the recovery period kept her out of both national and international competition for much of the year. In July 2007, although she was still recovering from her injury, she returned to competition as a member of the American team for the Pan Am Games in Rio de Janeiro. She competed only on bars and beam, contributing to the team's gold-medal finish and winning individual silver medals in the uneven bars and balance beam finals.

Despite limited training time on floor and vault in the summer of 2007, Liukin opted to compete all-around at the 2007 U.S. National Championships. She posted the highest score of the entire meet on bars and the second highest score on beam on the second day of competition, winning the senior bars title for the third year in a row and placing second on beam. However, she made several falls and errors on floor and vault, finishing in third place overall, more than five points behind Shawn Johnson, the all-around gold medalist.

Following Nationals, Liukin was named to the American team for the World Championships in Stuttgart, Germany, where she competed all-around in the team qualifying round and on bars and beam in the finals. Liukin's score for her bars routine in team finals was a 16.375, the highest score of the day and, in the end, the entire World Championships. However, she made an error at the end of her beam routine and scored 15.175. The team recovered from this and other mistakes to finish first overall with 184.400. Her struggles with the balance beam continued in the all-around final, where she fell. She finished the competition in fifth place. In the event finals, however, Liukin regained her world champion title on the balance beam with a score of 16.025. She also earned a silver on the uneven bars behind Russia's Ksenia Semenova, scoring a 16.300 after taking a step on her dismount.

=== 2008 ===
Liukin in competition

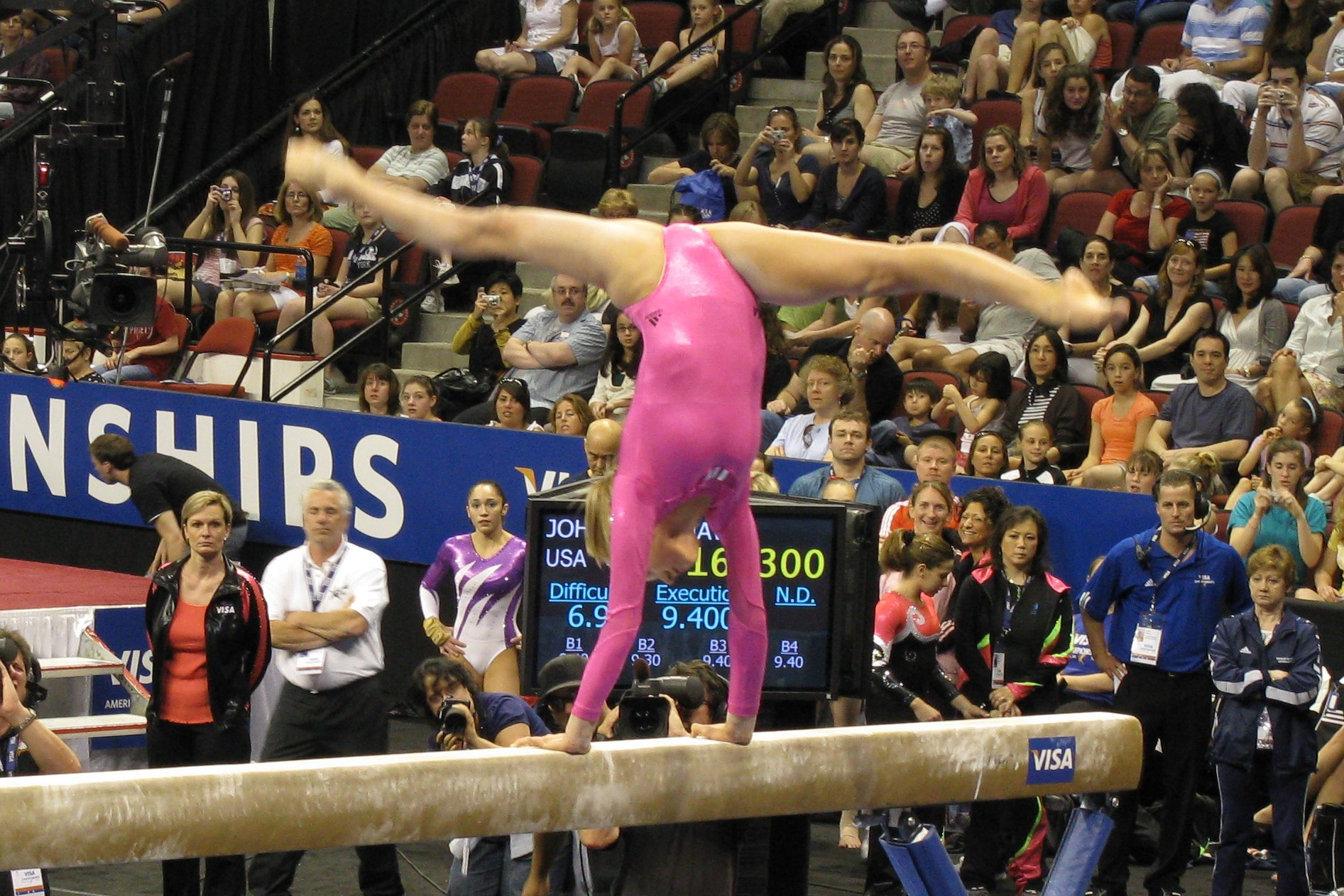
Liukin performs on the balance beam at the 2008 U.S. National Championships.

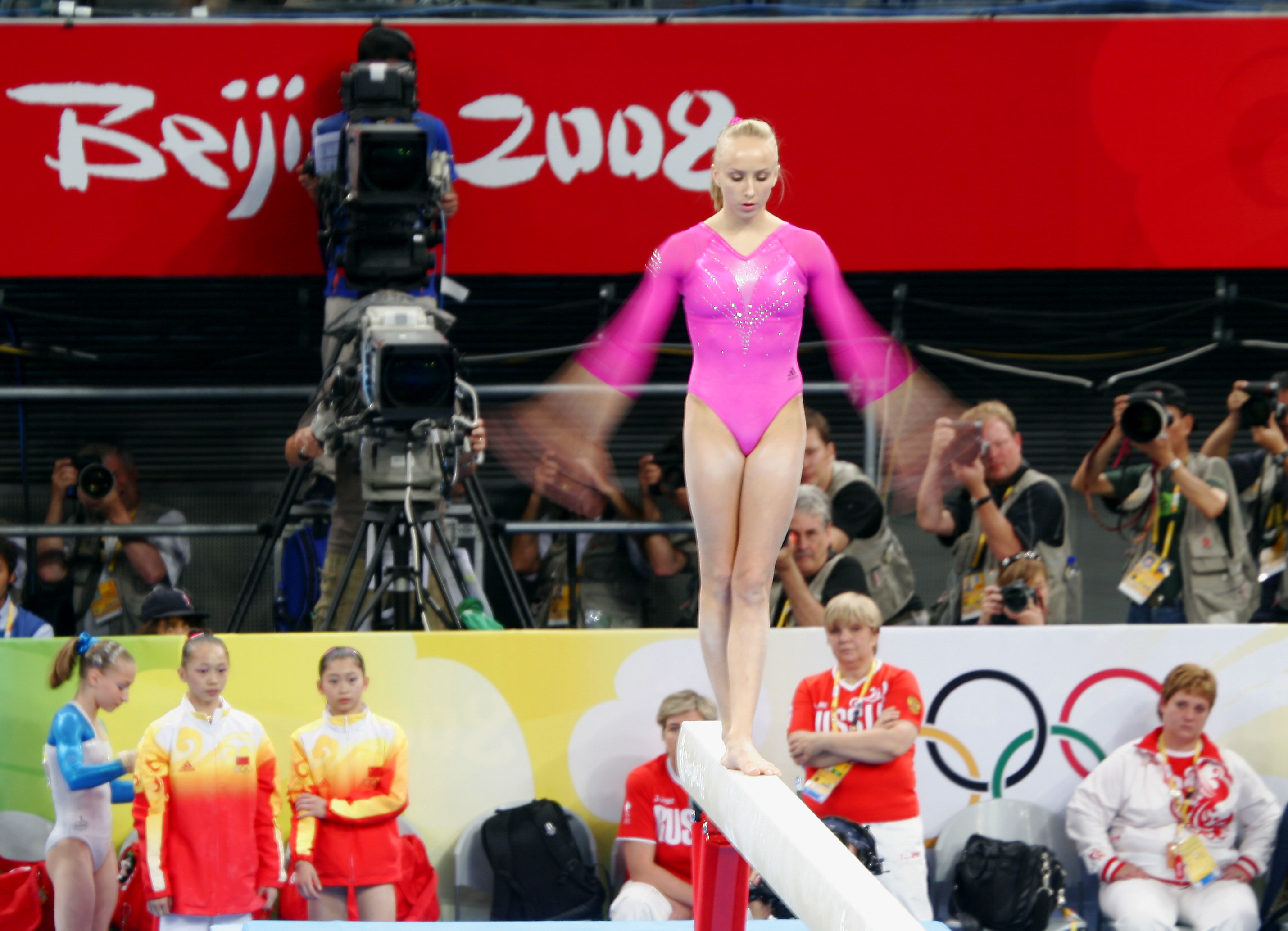
Liukin performing on the balance beam at the 2008 Olympics.

Liukin's first meet of the 2008 season was the American Cup in New York City, where she defeated 2007 winner Shawn Johnson to regain her title. She posted the highest score of the meet, a 16.600 on the uneven bars. In March, Nastia competed at the Pacific Rim (formerly Pacific Alliance) Championships in San Jose, where she led the American team to a gold medal and won the all-around and balance beam titles. In the team competition, Liukin posted an all-time high score of 16.650 on the uneven bars, but in event finals, she fell on her Gienger release move and took a step on her dismount, earning a 15.225 and taking second place.

At the 2008 U.S. National Championships in Boston, Liukin fell on the floor on her double front tuck on the first day of competition, but had a strong meet on her other events and placed second in the all-around behind Shawn Johnson. She regained her national champion title on the beam and defended her national title on the uneven bars for the fourth consecutive year, scoring 17.050 in preliminaries and 17.100 in finals. In June, Liukin competed in the U.S. Olympic Trials in Philadelphia, finishing second behind Johnson and earning a spot on the American team for Beijing.

==== 2008 Summer Olympics ====
Liukin performed in the all-around in the qualifying round of competition. She fell on her dismount from the uneven bars, but nevertheless qualified for the all-around final with a score of 62.325. Liukin also qualified to three event finals: beam, uneven bars (in spite of the fall) and floor exercise.

In the team finals, Liukin performed on three events: beam, bars and floor exercise. Her uneven bars score of 16.900 was the highest mark awarded in the entire Olympic competition. Liukin performed second on balance beam, matching her qualifying score of 15.975. On floor exercise, she stepped out of bounds on her first tumbling pass, incurring a 0.1-point penalty, with a final score of 15.200. The American team earned the silver medal, 2.375 points behind China.

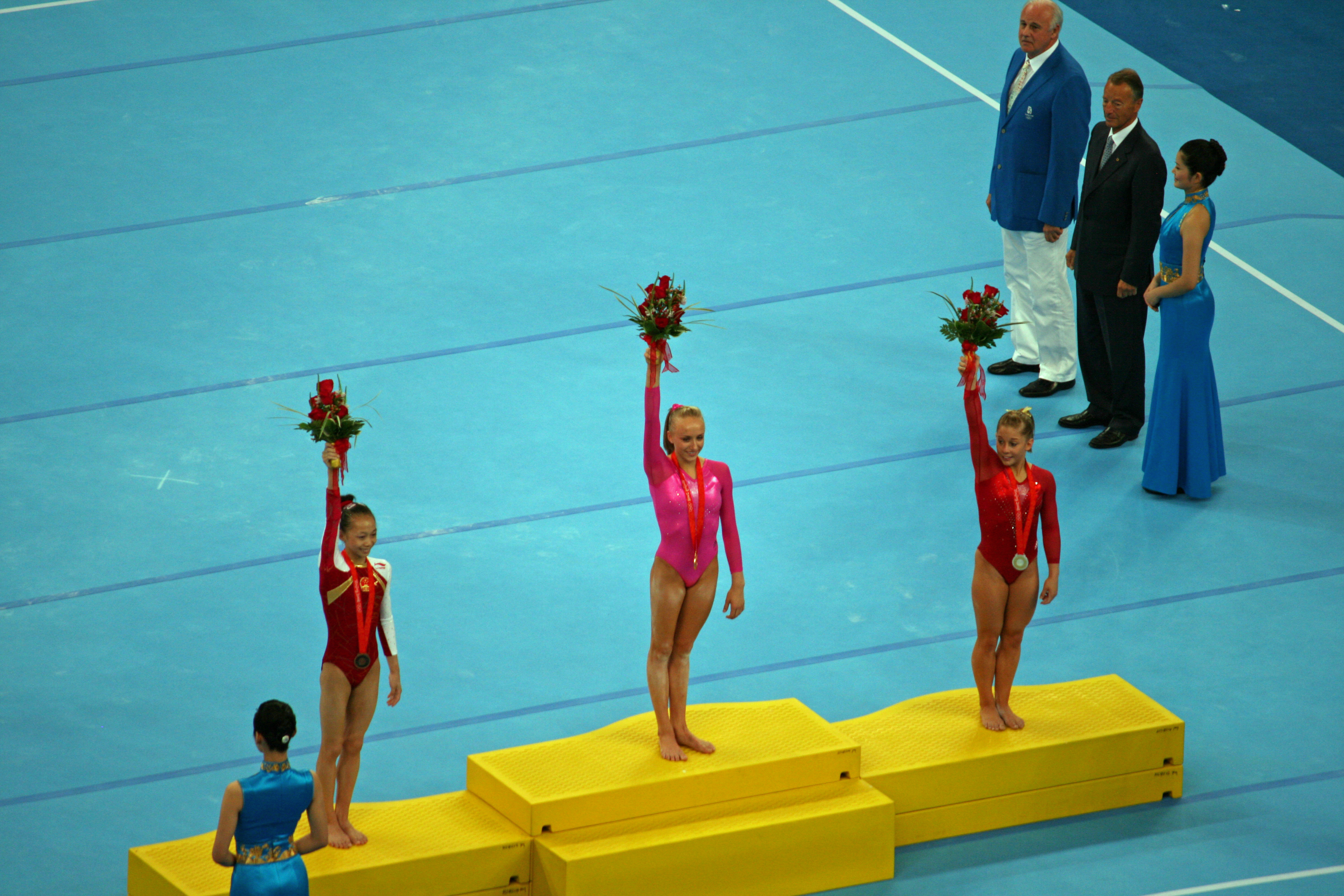
Liukin (center) winning the gold medal in the all-around

On August 15, Liukin performed clean routines on all four events (sticking her landings on three out of four events) to win the all-around gold medal with a final score of 63.325. Shawn Johnson took the silver medal with a score of 62.725. The win marked the third time that an American woman had won the Olympic all-around title; Mary Lou Retton and Carly Patterson were the two previous American gold medalists. It was also the fourth time in the history of the Games that two athletes from the same country had taken first and second place in the women's all-around.

"Liukin is simply breathtaking [on balance beam]. From the moment she puts her fingertips onto the beam and presses herself up into the splits, her long legs unfurling like the petals of a flower, every movement is performance art. In one front somersault she lands without ever putting one of her feet on the beam, brushing it back until her leg is fully extended behind her. It's incredibly difficult – few other people even try it – yet she does it as easily as a cartwheel.

— USA Today, 2008

In the event finals, Liukin earned a surprising bronze medal on floor exercise with a score of 15.425, behind Shawn Johnson, with 15.500, and Romanian Sandra Izbasa, with 15.650. On uneven bars, Liukin and China's He Kexin both posted final marks of 16.725 and earned identical A- and B-panel scores of 7.70 and 9.025, respectively. However, He Kexin was awarded the gold medal, and Liukin got the silver, after a tie-breaking calculation that took into account individual marks given by judges on the B-panel. In the balance beam final, Liukin scored 16.025 to claim silver behind Shawn Johnson's 16.225. With her fifth Beijing medal, Liukin tied Mary Lou Retton and Shannon Miller for the most gymnastics medals won by an American in a single Olympic Games.

Following her success in Beijing, Liukin was named the USOC Female Athlete of the Month (August) and ultimately USOC Co-Sportswoman of the Year alongside swimmer Natalie Coughlin; the Women's Sports Foundation Individual Sportswoman of the Year and FIG Athlete of the Year. In addition, she was ranked third in the Associated Press' 2008 Female Athlete of the Year voting behind Candace Parker and Lorena Ochoa.

=== 2009 ===
Liukin decided that she was not done with gymnastics and made her first post-Olympics competitive appearance at the CoverGirl Classic, where she competed only on the balance beam. She placed second behind WOGA teammate Ivana Hong. Liukin once again just performed on the beam at the U.S. Championships, placing fourth. Liukin was added to the national team and included in the World Championships selection camp. However, she pulled out of Worlds selection consideration because she felt that she was not up to World Championships standards.

=== 2012 ===
Liukin announced in the fall of 2011 that she had resumed training for the 2012 Olympic Games. She returned to competition at the 2012 U.S. Classic and only competed on the balance beam, where she finished third. At the Visa Championships, Liukin competed on the balance beam and the uneven bars. On the balance beam, she scored a 15.100 on night one, followed by a 14.100 on night two to place sixth on the event. On the uneven bars, she placed 20th after scoring a 13.150 on night one and 13.650 on night two. Liukin was chosen to compete at the Olympic Trials.

Liukin's gymnastics career came to an end after the 2012 Olympic Trials. On the final night of competition, she fell off the bars on her Gienger release, but got back up to finish her routine and landed her first competitive dismount since her comeback. Her bars routine received a 13.950. Her beam routine scored a 14.950, and she did not make the Olympic team. Liukin went to London as the athlete representative for the International Gymnastics Federation (FIG).

== Nastia Liukin Cup ==
The Nastia Liukin Cup is an annual gymnastics competition held in the United States that is hosted by Liukin. The inaugural edition was contested in 2010. The competition is open to Level 10 gymnasts, who can only qualify for the event at designated invitationals across the country. There are both junior and senior fields for the competition, and the competition takes place the Friday prior to the AT&T American Cup, which occurs on the next day, Saturday. The incentive of the competition is to give pre-elite athletes the experience and opportunity to compete on a raised podium surface as well as in a large arena, which is not the norm for average USAG Optional competitions. In 2009, Liukin established the Nastia Liukin Fund in conjunction with USA Gymnastics. The fund's goals include building partnerships with fitness-oriented programs for young people and supporting clubs that have programs that aid gymnastics athletes who need financial assistance. Since its inception in 2010, all net proceeds from the Nastia Liukin Cup have gone to the fund.

Many former competitors at the Cup have gone on to elite competition and even international competition, with 2012 Olympic all-around champion Gabby Douglas and 2017 World all-around champion Morgan Hurd having competed in the 2010 and 2014 editions respectively. World champions including Maggie Nichols and MyKayla Skinner have also participated in the event.

== Media appearances ==
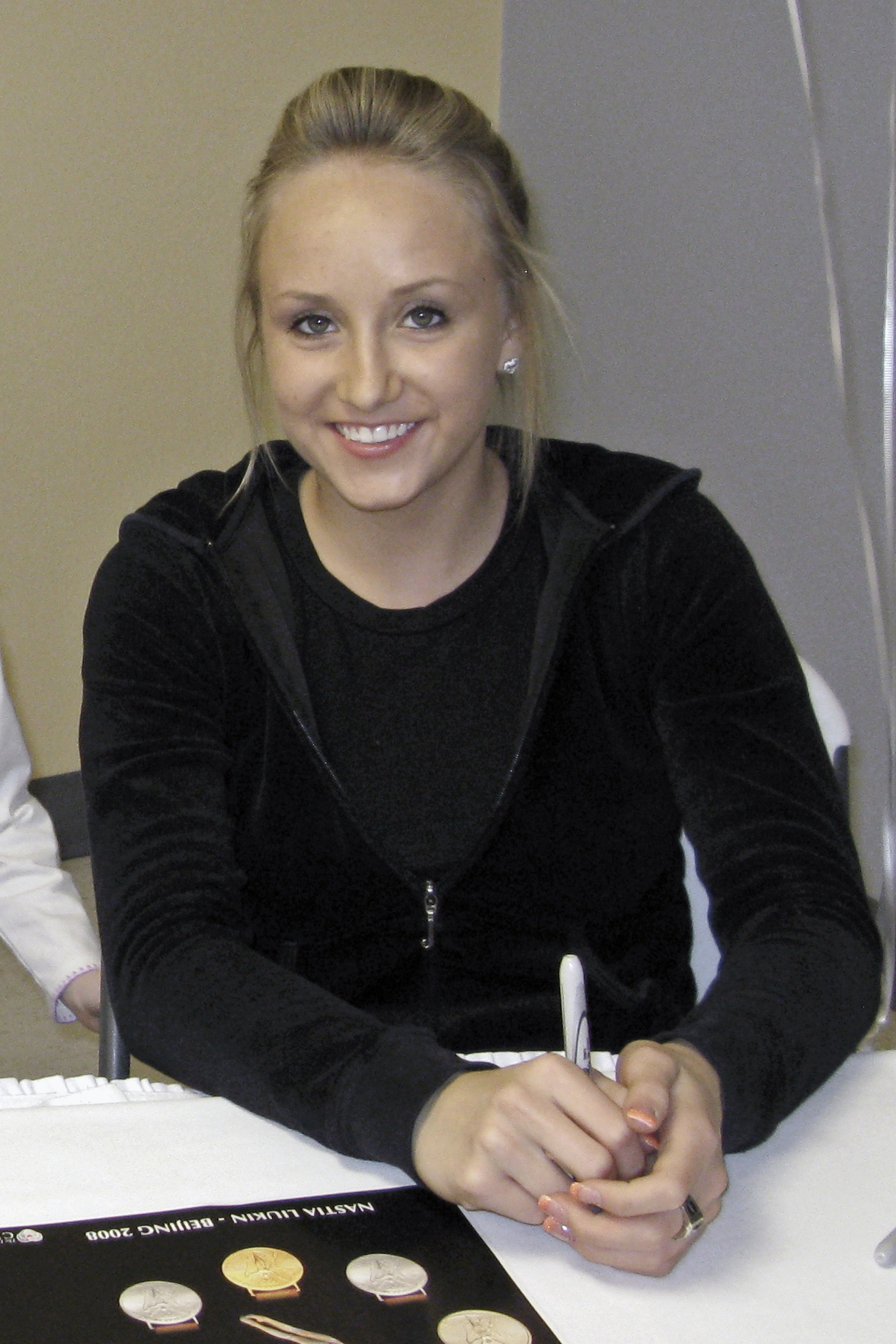
Liukin in 2009

=== Film and television ===
Liukin had cameo roles in the April 2006 Touchstone Pictures film Stick It, and a 2008 episode of Gossip Girl. Liukin also guest starred on The CW series Hellcats.

Liukin was on The Tour of Gymnastics Superstars after the 2008 Olympic Games, which was broadcast nationwide on MyNetworkTV.

On February 24, 2015, Liukin was announced as one of the celebrities who would compete on the 20th season of Dancing with the Stars. She was partnered with professional dancer and five-time champion Derek Hough. They made it to week 9 (the semi-finals), but were then eliminated on May 12, 2015, despite consistent high scores. She later returned to Dancing with the Stars during season 27 to be a trio partner to Mary Lou Retton and Sasha Farber.

On May 4, 2015, Liukin was announced as the grand marshal for the 99th Indianapolis 500.

In January 2023, Liukin appeared on the reality show Special Forces on FOX alongside other celebrities.

In October 2025, Liukin appeared on the Speed Goes Pro YouTube series.

Liukin serves as an analyst for NBC Sports Group during their coverage of gymnastics events. She was also a special correspondent for NBC during the 2014 Winter Olympic Games in Sochi.

=== Professional alliances ===
In 2017, Liukin launched her own line of gymnastics equipment, including mats, bars and balance beams in her signature pink, produced by American Athletic, Inc.

Liukin's corporate sponsors include Visa, AT&T, GK Elite Sportswear and Longines. She appeared in an Adidas commercial with Nadia Comăneci that ran during the 2004 Olympics and a 2008 commercial for Visa Inc. She signed an endorsement deal on March 15, 2010, and appeared in commercials for Subway. After the Beijing Olympics, she was signed to be one of four American Olympians featured on Wheaties cereal boxes.

Liukin was a Longines Sports Ambassador of Elegance in 2006 and, along with her teammates Shawn Johnson and Alicia Sacramone, was one of the first female athletes ever to be signed as CoverGirl spokesmodels. She also collaborated with Vanilla Star Jeans to create a junior girls' clothing line and has modeled for Max Azria. In June 2010, she launched a line of girls' wear called Supergirl by Nastia for department store chain JC Penney.

=== Literature ===
Liukin released her autobiography, Finding My Shine, on November 24, 2015.

== Honors ==
Liukin was inducted into the International Gymnastics Hall of Fame in 2018 and into the U.S. Olympic and Paralympic Hall of Fame in 2019.

== Eponymous skill ==
Liukin has one eponymous skill listed in the Code of Points.

Apparatus	Name	Description	Difficulty (Note: Valid for the 2025–2028 Code of Points)
Balance beam	Liukin	Salto forward tucked, take-off from one leg to stand on one or two feet	C (0.3)

== Competitive history ==
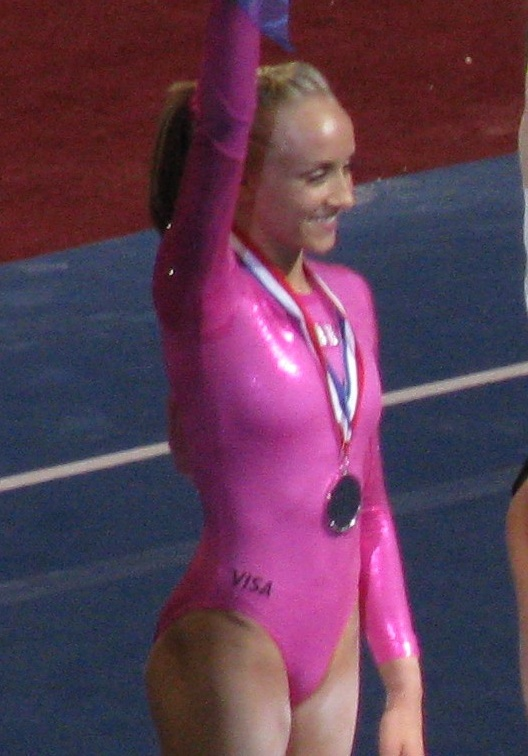
Liukin with the all-around silver medal at the 2008 U.S. National Championships

Competitive history of Nastia Liukin at the junior level
Year	Event	Team	AA	VT	UB	BB	FX
2002	USA-Japan Dual Meet	1st place, gold medalist(s)	1st place, gold medalist(s)		1st place, gold medalist(s)	1st place, gold medalist(s)	1st place, gold medalist(s)
2002	USA-Canada Friendly	1st place, gold medalist(s)	3rd place, bronze medalist(s)		2nd place, silver medalist(s)	3rd place, bronze medalist(s)	2nd place, silver medalist(s)
2002	Pan American Championships	1st place, gold medalist(s)	2nd place, silver medalist(s)		2nd place, silver medalist(s)	2nd place, silver medalist(s)	
2002	American Classic					5	3rd place, bronze medalist(s)
2002	U.S. Classic		3rd place, bronze medalist(s)		4	2nd place, silver medalist(s)	4
2002	U.S. Championships		15			5	5
2003
2003	Pan American Games	1st place, gold medalist(s)	2nd place, silver medalist(s)		3rd place, bronze medalist(s)	1st place, gold medalist(s)	3rd place, bronze medalist(s)
2003	American Classic		1st place, gold medalist(s)		2nd place, silver medalist(s)		1st place, gold medalist(s)
2003	U.S. Classic		1st place, gold medalist(s)	1st place, gold medalist(s)	1st place, gold medalist(s)	1st place, gold medalist(s)	1st place, gold medalist(s)
2003	U.S. Championships		1st place, gold medalist(s)		1st place, gold medalist(s)	1st place, gold medalist(s)	1st place, gold medalist(s)
2004	Pacific Alliance Championships	1st place, gold medalist(s)	1st place, gold medalist(s)		1st place, gold medalist(s)	1st place, gold medalist(s)	1st place, gold medalist(s)
2004	American Classic		1st place, gold medalist(s)		1st place, gold medalist(s)	1st place, gold medalist(s)	1st place, gold medalist(s)
2004	U.S. Championships		1st place, gold medalist(s)		1st place, gold medalist(s)	1st place, gold medalist(s)	1st place, gold medalist(s)

Competitive history of Nastia Liukin at the senior level
Year	Event	Team	AA	VT	UB	BB	FX
2005	American Cup				6	1st place, gold medalist(s)	
2005	USA-Great Britain Friendly	1st place, gold medalist(s)	1st place, gold medalist(s)		2nd place, silver medalist(s)	1st place, gold medalist(s)	1st place, gold medalist(s)
2005	USA-Switzerland Friendly	1st place, gold medalist(s)	1st place, gold medalist(s)	2nd place, silver medalist(s)	1st place, gold medalist(s)	1st place, gold medalist(s)	1st place, gold medalist(s)
2005	U.S. Classic		1st place, gold medalist(s)	4	1st place, gold medalist(s)	1st place, gold medalist(s)	2nd place, silver medalist(s)
2005	U.S. Championships		1st place, gold medalist(s)	4	1st place, gold medalist(s)	1st place, gold medalist(s)	2nd place, silver medalist(s)
2005	World Championships		2nd place, silver medalist(s)		1st place, gold medalist(s)	1st place, gold medalist(s)	2nd place, silver medalist(s)
2006	American Cup		1st place, gold medalist(s)				
2006	Pacific Alliance Championships	1st place, gold medalist(s)	1st place, gold medalist(s)		1st place, gold medalist(s)	2nd place, silver medalist(s)	
2006	U.S. Classic		4	9	6	1st place, gold medalist(s)	9
2006	U.S. Championships		1st place, gold medalist(s)		1st place, gold medalist(s)	1st place, gold medalist(s)	7
2006	World Championships	2nd place, silver medalist(s)			2nd place, silver medalist(s)		
2007
2007	Pan American Games	1st place, gold medalist(s)			2nd place, silver medalist(s)	2nd place, silver medalist(s)	
2007	U.S. Championships		3rd place, bronze medalist(s)		1st place, gold medalist(s)	2nd place, silver medalist(s)	12
2007	World Championships	1st place, gold medalist(s)	5		2nd place, silver medalist(s)	1st place, gold medalist(s)	
2008	American Cup		1st place, gold medalist(s)				
2008	Pacific Rim Championships	1st place, gold medalist(s)	1st place, gold medalist(s)		2nd place, silver medalist(s)	1st place, gold medalist(s)	4
2008	U.S. Championships		2nd place, silver medalist(s)		1st place, gold medalist(s)	1st place, gold medalist(s)	8
2008	U.S. Olympic Trials		2nd place, silver medalist(s)	5	1st place, gold medalist(s)	3rd place, bronze medalist(s)	2nd place, silver medalist(s)
2008	Olympic Games	2nd place, silver medalist(s)	1st place, gold medalist(s)		2nd place, silver medalist(s)	2nd place, silver medalist(s)	3rd place, bronze medalist(s)
2009	U.S. Classic					2nd place, silver medalist(s)	
2009	U.S. Championships					4	
2012	U.S. Classic					3rd place, bronze medalist(s)	
2012	U.S. Championships				19	6	
2012	U.S. Olympic Trials				10	7	

== See also ==
- List of multiple Olympic medalists at a single Games
- List of top Olympic gymnastics medalists
- List of top medalists at the World Artistic Gymnastics Championships
- List of Olympic female gymnasts for the United States
