= Clay Strother =

American artistic gymnast

- Full name: Clayton Strother
- Born: October 28, 1980 (age 45)

Gymnastics career
- Discipline: Men's artistic gymnastics
- Country represented: United States (2001–2008)
- College team: Minnesota Golden Gophers
- Gym: Team Chevron; Beaumont Gymnastics Academy
- Head coaches: Russ Fystrom, Mike Burns
- Retired: 2008
Medal record
Men's artistic gymnastics
Representing United States
Event	1st	2nd	3rd
Pan American Games	0	1	2
Total	0	1	2
Pan American Games
Silver medal – second place	2003 Santo Domingo	Floor
Bronze medal – third place	2003 Santo Domingo	Team
Bronze medal – third place	2003 Santo Domingo	Pommel horse

Clayton Strother (born October 28, 1980) is a retired American artistic gymnast. He was a member of the United States men's national artistic gymnastics team and won multiple medals while representing the United States at the 2003 Pan American Games.

== Early life and education ==
Strother was born October 28, 1980, to Mike and Cynthia Strother. He participated in gymnastics from a young age at Beaumont Gymnastics Academy and was selected as a member of USA Gymnastics' Olympic Development Program.

His hometown was Jasper, Texas, U.S. and he attended Jasper High School. He enrolled at the University of Minnesota to pursue gymnastics.

== Gymnastics career ==
Strother was a member of the Minnesota Golden Gophers men's gymnastics team, where he became one of the most accomplished gymnasts in program history. He was a four-time NCAA champion, winning individual titles on both the floor and pommel horse at the 2001 and 2002 NCAA gymnastics championships. He was inducted to the Minnesota Golden Gophers Hall of Fame Class of 2016.

Domestically, Strother saw success throughout his career. At Winter Cup, he was first on the floor and pommel horse events en route to a second-place all-around finish at the 2001 Winter Cup. At the USA Gymnastics National Championships, he had top three placements on the floor (2002, 2006), pommel horse (2002, 2007), and vault (2006).

Internationally, Strother represented the United States at the 2003 Pan American Games. Despite being ill at the event, he won two individual medals – silver on floor and bronze on pommel horse – in addition to a team bronze medal. At the 2004 United States Olympic trials, he finished 15th in the all-around, but his results on floor and pommel horse, his two best events, led to him not being selected for the team. He also competed at the 2006 World Artistic Gymnastics Championships.

Strother retired from gymnastics in 2008 after the 2007 Good Luck Beijing International Tournament.
