= Gienger =

The Gienger is a gymnastics skill performed on the uneven bars for women and the high bar for men. It is named after German gymnast Eberhard Gienger. The release move looks like a half-turn layout "flyaway" above the bar to catch the same bar. Its COP reference is 3.405 and it is a D element.

The skill typically begins from a handstand followed by a swing backward and release after 3/4 of a revolution around the bar. The skill begins as a backward salto with the gymnast completing a 1/2 twist (180°) before regrasp on the same bar that was released. The Gienger can be done with either a piked (traditional) or stretched body form. A variation on the Gienger is the Def (COP 3.605), which is a G-rated element and is identical to the Gienger except that instead of a 1/2 twist (180°), the gymnast performs 1 1/2 twists (540°) before regrasp on the bar.

Gienger saltos are technically similar to Deltchev saltos, with the latter initiating the 1/2 twist before initiating the Arabian (which is also usually straddled rather than piked or stretched).

Some of the female gymnasts that perform the Gienger are Nastia Liukin, Eugenia Popa, and Shawn Johnson.
