= Jonathan Horton =

American artistic gymnast

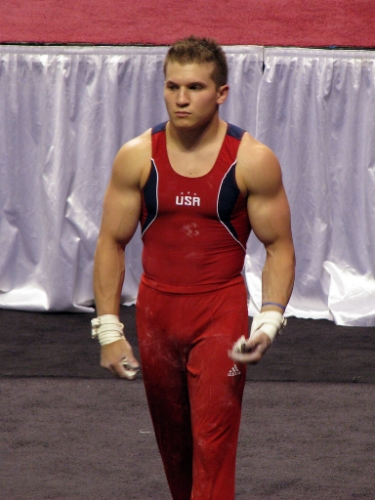
- Horton in 2009

Personal information
- Full name: Jonathan Alan Horton
- Born: December 31, 1985 (age 40) Houston, Texas, U.S.
- Height: 155 cm (5 ft 1 in)

Gymnastics career
- Discipline: Men's artistic gymnastics
- Country represented: United States; (2004–2016)
- Gym: Cypress Academy; Team Hilton HHonors
- Head coach: Tom Meadows
- Former coach: Mark Williams
- Retired: June 21, 2017
- Awards: Nissen-Emery Award (2008)
Medal record
Men's artistic gymnastics
Representing United States
Event	1st	2nd	3rd
Olympic Games	0	1	1
World Championships	0	0	2
Pan American Games	0	0	1
Pan American Championships	3	1	1
Total	3	2	5
Olympic Games
Silver medal – second place	2008 Beijing	Horizontal bar
Bronze medal – third place	2008 Beijing	Team
World Championships
Bronze medal – third place	2010 Rotterdam	All-around
Bronze medal – third place	2011 Tokyo	Team
Pan American Games
Bronze medal – third place	2003 Santo Domingo	Team
Pan American Championships
Gold medal – first place	2004 Maracaibo	Vault
Gold medal – first place	2005 Rio de Janeiro	Team
Gold medal – first place	2014 Mississauga	Team
Silver medal – second place	2004 Maracaibo	Rings
Bronze medal – third place	2004 Maracaibo	Horizontal bar

Jonathan Alan Horton (born December 31, 1985) is a former American artistic gymnast. He was a member of the United States men's national artistic gymnastics team and is the 2008 Olympic silver medalist on horizontal bar, the 2010 World all-around bronze medalist, a two-time Olympian, a two-time U.S. National All-Around Champion, and a 17-time medalist at the U.S. National Championships. At the 2008 Olympics, he also won a bronze medal with his U.S. teammates in the team competition. He also competed at the 2012 Summer Olympics in London, where he qualified for the horizontal bar event final and finished in sixth place. In 2016, he had surgery on his left rotator cuff and, as a result, was unable to qualify for the 2016 Olympics in Rio de Janeiro.

== Early life and education ==
Horton was born on December 31, 1985, in Houston. His father, Robert, is an engineer, and his mother, Margo, works in real estate. His elder sister, Margo, is a dance instructor.

Horton began gymnastics at the age of four in 1990. "I was a wild child", Horton said, "I once climbed a pole in the middle of Target all the way to the ceiling. I used to do back flips on my parents' bed and I rode a garage door to the top when I was 3 years old."

He attended Cy-Fair High School in Cypress, Texas.

== Gymnastics career ==
Horton debuted as a senior (despite still competing as a junior) in 2002 at the U.S. National Championships in Cleveland, Ohio. He placed first on rings and vault, second in the all-around and the floor exercise, and tied for fifth on the horizontal bar. In 2003, he competed in the Winter Cup challenge, where he qualified for the individual event finals. Later that year, he was chosen to compete for the United States at the Pan American Games in Santo Domingo, where the men's team won bronze, and he placed fourth all-around.

Horton competed in the U.S. Nationals and Olympic Team trials in 2004 and placed 13th. That same year, he entered the University of Oklahoma. He was recruited by Iowa, Michigan, Ohio State, Oklahoma, and Penn State, and committed to compete for the University of Oklahoma beginning in 2004 for the 2004–05 NCAA season.

=== 2005–08 ===
From 2005–08, Horton competed for the Oklahoma Sooners gymnastics team alongside his 2010 & 2011 world teammates Chris Brooks and Steven Legendre. When competing for Oklahoma, he won six NCAA titles and 18 All-American honors, breaking the record previously set by Bart Conner. His OU record for titles and honors still stands.

In 2005, Horton again competed at the Winter Cup, placing eighth all-around, and was selected again for the U.S. National Team.

At the beginning of 2006, during Horton's second year at OU, he won an all-around silver at the Winter Cup. He later competed at the American Cup and won the all-around and rings competitions. That summer, he competed in the U.S. National Championships and won gold on the floor, silver in the all-around, and bronze on the horizontal bar. His performances led to him being chosen to represent the U.S.A. at the 2006 World Artistic Gymnastics Championships in Aarhus. A very young and inexperienced Worlds team, they finished 13th in the qualifying rounds, not making the team finals.

In 2007, Horton competed at the Winter Cup and the American Cup. He won his second consecutive American Cup All-Around title, the first male gymnast since Blaine Wilson to achieve the feat. After competing in the NCAA and U.S. National Championships, he was again chosen for the 2007 World Artistic Gymnastics Championships, where he finished fourth in the all-around and helped the U.S.A. qualify a full men's team to the 2008 Summer Olympics.

In 2008, Horton competed in the Winter Cup, the American Cup, and as a senior for Oklahoma. That year the Sooners won the NCAA Championships, and Horton won another NCAA individual title on the rings. At the U.S. National Championships in Houston, Horton won silver medals on the floor, rings, and all-around. This qualified him for the 2008 U.S. Olympic Trials.

=== 2008 Olympic Games ===
Horton was named to the U.S. Olympic team following the 2008 Olympic Trials, where he was the all-around champion. The team entered the 2008 Beijing Olympics with much skepticism about whether the team could compete against established teams such as the Japanese, Chinese, and German teams. Injuries had forced team leaders Paul Hamm and Morgan Hamm to withdraw from the competition, causing the American team to bring in alternates Raj Bhavsar and Alexander Artemev. The American men performed better than anticipated, with Horton being the team's top performer. The American team ended the competition with the bronze medal after a stressful pommel horse event. In the event finals, Horton placed ninth all-around and added a silver medal in the horizontal bar event.

=== 2009–12 ===
In 2009, Horton became the U.S. National Champion and competed at the 2009 World Artistic Gymnastics Championships in London, where he reached the finals in the all-around and on the horizontal bar.

In 2010, Horton competed in the American Cup and placed second all-around. That summer he defended his national all-around title at the U.S. National Championships in Hartford. He was selected for the 2010 World Artistic Gymnastics Championships in Rotterdam, where the U.S. team placed fourth, and Horton won the all-around bronze medal.

In 2011, Horton won his third American Cup all-around title and was captain of the U.S. team that won the bronze medal at the 2011 World Artistic Gymnastics Championships. Although qualifying fifth all-around in the preliminary round, he was edged out by teammates Danell Leyva and John Orozco (only two athletes from each country were allowed to compete in individual event finals). Regarding this, he said, "I didn't make the all-around final because two of my teammates are freakin' awesome at gymnastics – but it doesn't matter, because I'm all about the team". During the team final, he landed badly on the vault, injuring his left foot, but continued to compete. The next day he could not walk, yet after treatment, he competed on the rings. On returning home, it was discovered that the injury was worse than previously thought, with a torn ligament and two broken bones in a foot that would require surgery. Despite this setback in his training, he told the media that it could make him a stronger gymnast because '[he would] have an opportunity to get really strong on the other four events.'

In 2012, Horton qualified for the men's artistic gymnastics 2012 London Olympic team. The New York Times stated that the team roster was "considered so good that it could be the first United States men's team to win gold since the 1984 Los Angeles Games." The team finished fifth, while Horton's best result in an individual event final was sixth place on the horizontal bar.

== Awards ==
- 2008 NCAA Nissen-Emery Award winner
- 2008 USA Gymnastics Men's Athlete of the Year
- Nominated for 2008 James E. Sullivan Award.

== Personal life ==
Horton performed alongside his 2008 Beijing Olympic teammates at The 2008 Tour of Gymnastics Superstars. The tour began on September 7, 2008, and concluded on November 16. The dance sets had a mix of hip-hop and contemporary dance with gymnastic elements.

Horton has competed on three seasons of American Ninja Warrior. In Season 6 (2014), he failed on the 5th obstacle, the ring toss, in the Dallas qualifying course. He became "the shortest man to ever make it to the top of the warped wall" as a walk-on to the Houston qualifying course for Season 7 (2015). He finished in 13th place with a time of 3:30.32. In Season 9, Horton's 4:27.28 finish gave him the 14th fastest time on the San Antonio qualifying course.

On June 20, 2009, Horton married Haley DeProspero, M.D., a former gymnast for the University of Oklahoma. He has two children.

== Competition results ==
=== National ===
- 2011 Visa Championships (US Nationals), Saint Paul, MN: 2nd-AA
- 2010 Visa Championships (US Nationals), Hartford, CT: 1st-AA
- 2009 Visa Championships (US Nationals), Dallas, TX.:1st-AA, HB, SR; 2nd-FX
- 2008 U.S. Olympic Team Trials: 1st-AA
- 2008 Visa Championships (US Nationals): 2nd-AA, SR; 3rd-FX
- 2008 NCAA Championships: first team; 2nd-AA; 1st-SR
- 2008 Winter Cup Challenge, Las Vegas, Nev.: 3rd-SR
- 2007 Visa Championships, San Jose, Calif.: 4th-PB, SR; 6th-AA
- 2007 NCAA Championships, State College, Pa.: 1st-FX, HB; 2nd-AA(T); 2nd-Team; 3rd-SR
- 2007 Winter Cup Challenge, Las Vegas, Nev.: 2nd-FX(T); 4th-PB(T); 6th-HB
- 2006 Visa Championships, St. Paul, Minn.: 1st-FX; 2nd-AA; 3rd-HB(T); 4th-SR
- 2006 NCAA Men's Gymnastics Championships, Norman, Okla.: 1st-AA, FX, SR
- 2006 Winter Cup Challenge, Las Vegas, Nev.: 2nd-AA; 3rd-FX, SR, HB
- 2005 Visa Championships, Indianapolis, Ind.: 5th-AA, FX, VT
- 2005 NCAA Men's Gymnastics Championships, West Point, N.Y.: 1st-Team; 3rd-AA, HB(T); 4th-FX
- 2005 Winter Cup Challenge, Las Vegas, Nev.: 1st-FX(T); 4th-VT
- 2004 Visa Championships, Nashville, Tenn.:
- 2004 Winter Cup, Las Vegas, Nev.:
- 2003 National Championships, Milwaukee, Wis.: 1st-AA (Jr. Div)
- 2003 Men's Junior Olympic National Championships, Savannah, Ga.: 2nd-HB; 3rd-AA; 4th-SR, PB
- 2003 Winter Cup Challenge, Las Vegas, Nev.: Individual Event Finalist
- 2002 U.S. Championships, Cleveland, Ohio: 1st-SR, VT; 2nd-AA, FX; 5th-HB(T)
- 2002 U.S. Men's Qualifier, Colorado Springs, Colo.:
- 2002 Men's Junior Olympic National Championships, San Diego, Calif.: 1st-AA; 2nd-FX, SR, VT, PB; 3rd-HB
- 2000 Men's Junior Olympic National Championships, Austin, Texas: 2nd-AA; 3rd-SR, VT
- 1999 Men's Junior Olympic National Championships, Houston, Texas
- 1998 Circle of Stars, Indianapolis, Indiana: 1st FX, PH, SR, VT, PB, HB, AA

=== International ===
- 2012 London Olympics, London, England: 5th-Team; 6th-HB
- 2011 World Championships, Tokyo, Japan: 3rd-Team; 7th-SR
- 2011 AT&T American Cup, Jacksonville, FL: 1st-AA
- 2010 World Championships, Rotterdam, Netherlands: 4th-Team; 3rd-AA
- 2009 World Championships, London, England
- 2008 Beijing Olympic Games, Beijing, China: 3rd-Team; 2nd-HB
- 2008 Tyson American Cup, New York, N.Y.: 5th-AA
- 2007 World Championships, Stuttgart, Germany: 4th-Team, AA
- 2007 USA vs. UKR vs. RUS, Kyiv, Ukraine: 1st-AA; 3rd-Team
- 2007 Tyson American Cup, Jacksonville, Fla.: 1st-AA
- 2006 World Championships, Aarhus, Denmark: Team
- 2006 France/Switzerland/USA Meet, Paris, France: 1st-Team; 2nd-AA
- 2006 Tyson American Cup, Philadelphia, Pa.: 1st-AA
- 2005 Pan American Championships, Rio de Janeiro, Brazil: 1st-Team
- 2005 World Cup, Paris, France:
- 2003 Junior International Invitational, Yokohama, Japan: 2nd-AA; 3rd-HB
- 2003 Pan American Games, Santo Domingo, Dominican Republic: 3rd-Team; 4th-AA(T)
