= 1998 Junior Pan American Rhythmic Gymnastics Championships =

Gymnastics competition held in 1998 in Houston, Texas

The 1998 Junior Pan American Rhythmic Gymnastics Championships was held in Houston, United States, July 14–19, 1998.

== Medal summary ==
Event	Gold	Silver	Bronze
Team	United States; Jessica Howard; Danielle Lord; Lindsay Powell	Canada; Roxoliana Prus; Amy Dipalma; Mai Nguyen	Brazil; Natália Dêntice; Liana Hermes; Natália Scherer
All-Around	Jessica Howard (USA)	Roxoliana Prus (CAN)	Danielle Lord (USA)
Rope	Roxoliana Prus (CAN)	Danielle Lord (USA)	Jessica Howard (USA)
Hoop	Roxoliana Prus (CAN)	Amy Dipalma (CAN)	Jessica Howard (USA)
Ball	Jessica Howard (USA) Lindsay Powell (USA)	—	Roxoliana Prus (CAN)
Ribbon	Roxoliana Prus (CAN)	Danielle Lord (USA)	Amy Dipalma (CAN)
Group	Canada	Venezuela	Chile
