= Gael Mackie =

Canadian artistic gymnast

- Full name: Gael Briane Mackie
- Born: December 16, 1988 (age 37) Vancouver, British Columbia, Canada

Gymnastics career
- Discipline: Women's artistic gymnastics
- Country represented: Canada
Medal record
Representing Canada
Commonwealth Games
Bronze medal – third place	2006 Melbourne	Team

Gael Briane Mackie (born December 16, 1988) is a Canadian artistic gymnast who competed at the 2004 Summer Olympics.

== Family ==
Mackie's father, William Mackie, twice qualified for the Canadian Olympic team in men's gymnastics, but both times, injuries prevented him from competing. Her younger sister, Charlotte, also competed as an elite gymnast, including at the 2009 World Artistic Gymnastics Championships.

== Gymnastics career ==
Coached by Vladimir and Svetlana Lashin at Omega Gymnastics, Mackie came to prominence on the Canadian gymnastics scene by winning the senior national championship at age 14.

As a junior elite gymnast, Mackie was the national champion on vault in 2001, and on vault, floor, and in the all-around in 2002. In 2003, she became the senior national all-around champion, as well as the Elite Canada champion on the uneven bars and balance beam. She was a member of the Canadian teams at the 2003 World Championships and at the 2002 and 2003 Pan American Games.

In 2004, Mackie was named to the Canadian team for the Olympic Games in Athens, along with Melanie Banville, Amelie Plante, Heather Purnell, Kate Richardson, and Kylie Stone. In the qualifications round, she competed only on the uneven bars. Canada finished 10th and did not advance to the team final.
