= Charles León Tamayo =

Cuban artistic gymnast

- Full name: Charles León Tamayo
- Born: 2 January 1981 (age 45)

Gymnastics career
- Discipline: Men's artistic gymnastics
- Country represented: Cuba (2001)
Medal record
Representing Cuba
World Championships
Bronze medal – third place	2001 Ghent	Vault
Pan American Games
Gold medal – first place	2003 Santo Domingo	Team
Pan American Championships
Gold medal – first place	2001 Cancún	Team
Gold medal – first place	2001 Cancún	Vault
Silver medal – second place	2001 Cancún	All-around
Silver medal – second place	2001 Cancún	Rings

Charles León Tamayo (born 2 January 1981) is a former Cuban male artistic gymnast. He is the 2001 World bronze medalist on vault and was part of the gold medal-winning teams at the 2003 Pan American Games and 2001 Pan American Championships. He was one of three Cuban gymnasts who defected during the 2003 World Artistic Gymnastics Championships.

== Early life ==
Tamayo began gymnastics when he was four years old.

== Gymnastics career ==
Tamayo competed at the 2001 Pan American Championships where he helped Cuba place first as a team. Individually, he won gold on vault and silver in the all-around and on rings behind compatriot Erick López. Later that year, he competed at the 2001 World Championships where he won bronze on vault behind Marian Drăgulescu and Jevgēņijs Saproņenko. In doing so Tamayo became the first male gymnast from Cuba to win a medal at the World Championships.

Tamayo traveled to Anaheim, California to compete at the 2003 World Championships. Although he had a broken ankle, he still competed in all six events.

Tamayo has a move named after him: a "laid-out arabian double front on floor". However, he admits he did not invent the move, but because he was the first to compete it, he earned the naming rights.

== Defection ==
Tamayo was frustrated with having to turn his prize winnings over to the federation and government and not being able to compete internationally as often due to budgetary constraints. He did not see a way to build a future for himself and his family after his athletic career was over.

"I started seeing many, many Olympians who sell their Olympic medals because they have nothing. They give us a car for being Olympic champion but they don’t give us, like, gas."

After the qualification round of the 2003 World Championships, Tamayo, alongside two other Cuban gymnasts, defected to the United States.
