= Mariana Gonçalves =

Brazilian artistic gymnast (born 1980)

- Born: April 29, 1980 (age 46) São Paulo
- Height: 160 cm (5 ft 3 in)

Gymnastics career
- Discipline: Women's artistic gymnastics
- Country represented: Brazil (1994-1997)
- Club: Yashi
Medal record
Representing Brazil
Women's Artistic gymnastics
Pan American Championships
Gold medal – first place	1997 Medellín	Team
Bronze medal – third place	1997 Medellín	All-Around

Mariana Bueloni Gonçalves (born 29 April 1980) is a retired Brazilian female artistic gymnast who represented her nation in international competitions. She participated at the 1995 World Artistic Gymnastics Championships in Sabae, Japan. She also took part at the 1995 Pan American Games in Buenos Aires, Argentina.
