= Antonella Yacobelli =

Spanish-Argentinian rhythmic gymnast

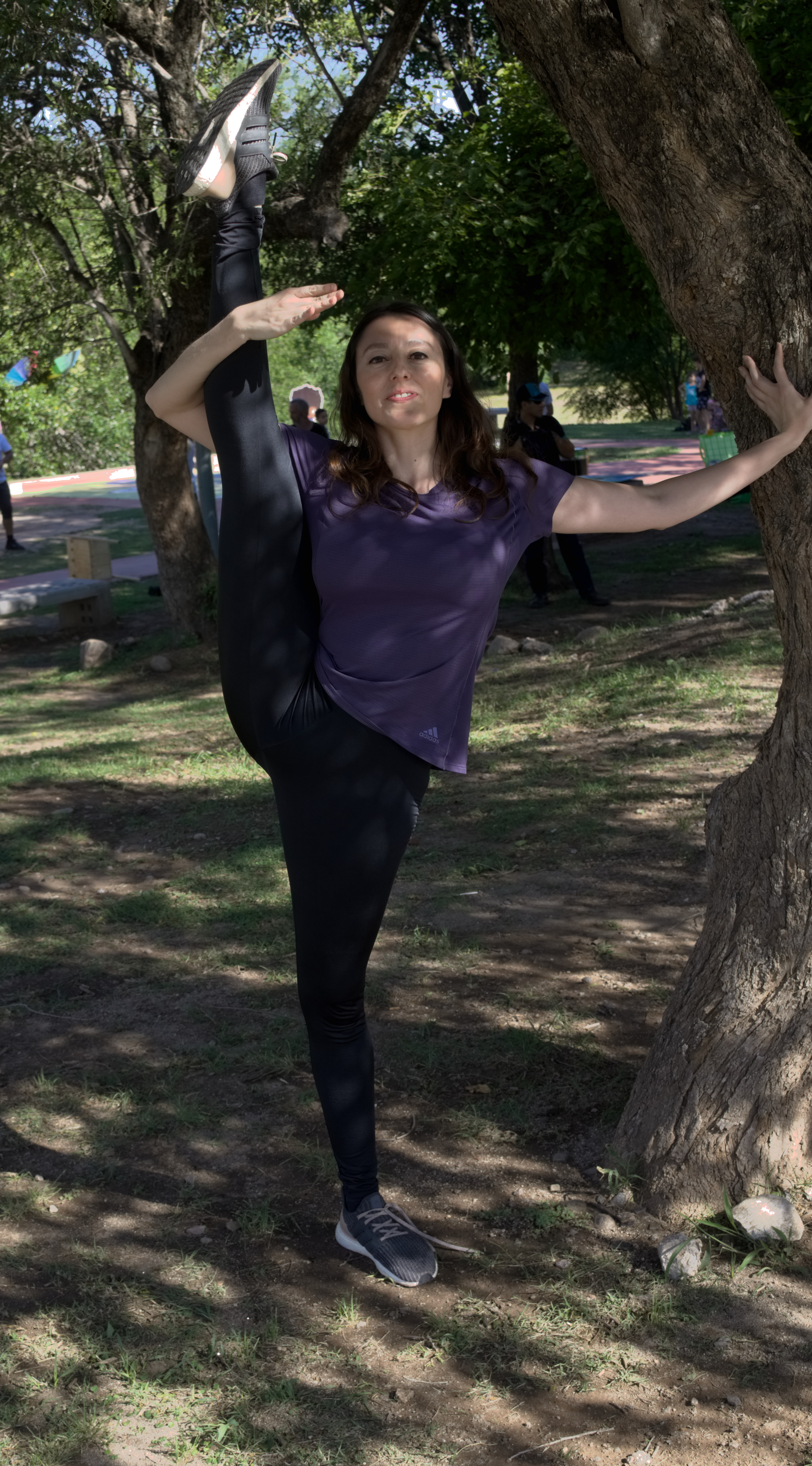
- Full name: Antonella Maria Yacobelli
- Born: 8 August 1984 (age 42) Cordoba, Argentina

Gymnastics career
- Discipline: Rhythmic gymnastics
- Country represented: Argentina (1995-2006)
- Club: Club Municipal de Córdoba
- Head coach: Silvina Márquez
- Retired: yes
Medal record
Rhythmic gymnastics
Representing Argentina
Pan American Championships
Bronze medal – third place	2001 Cancun	Team
South American Games
Gold medal – first place	2009 Lima	All-Around
Gold medal – first place	2006 Buenos Aires	Team
Gold medal – first place	2006 Buenos Aires	Rope
Gold medal – first place	2006 Buenos Aires	Clubs
Silver medal – second place	2006 Buenos Aires	All-Around
Bronze medal – third place	2002 Rio de Janeiro	Team
Bronze medal – third place	2002 Rio de Janeiro	Ribbon
Bronze medal – third place	2006 Buenos Aires	Ball

Antonella Yacobelli (born 8 August 1984) is a retired Argentinian rhythmic gymnast. She represented her country in international competitions.

== Biography ==
Antonella started her journey as an athlete when she was four at the Asociación Deportiva Atenas. At the age of six she decided to focus on rhythmic gymnastics, although she continued with dance at the Silvia Soria Arch Dance Studio but she did it as a complementary preparation.

In 1992 she switched to Instituto Atlético Central Córdoba and from 1995 onwards at the Club Municipal de Córdoba under Silvina Márquez. That year she also joined the national team winning gold in the All-Around at the South American Championships in Lima, Peru. In 1997 she was designated as "Olympic Promise 2004" by the secretary of sports of the nation, and was recognized as such by Carlos Saúl Menem.

She made World Championships debut in Osaka in 1999, competing with ball and ribbon. In 2001 she was 18th in teams at the World Championships in Madrid. In October she was selected for the Pan American Championships where she won team bronze along Anahí Sosa and Romina Rosensajn.

A year later she won bronze in teams and bronze with ribbon at the 2002 South American Games.

In 2003 she was 8th with hoop and clubs and 7th with ribbon at the Pan American Games in Santo Domingo. At the World Championships in Budapest she was 23rd in teams and 57th in the All-Around.

At the South American Games in 2006 she won team, rope and clubs gold as well as silver in the All-Around and bronze with ball.

She collaborated with professor Mario Di Santo in the edition of his book on "Joint Mobility", this text is used in physical 3ducation teachers throughout the country. The vast majority of photographs illustrating the movements have Yacobelli as the protagonist.

Yacobelli worked as an assistant coach at the Sport Club of Villa Allende, assisting Fabiana del Bel from 2003 to 2007. She then continued as a coach at the Benjamín Matienzo Club in Barrio Villa Cabrera from 2008 to 2011 and also began working at the Club Municipalidad de Córdoba, where she served as a coach of Level B gymnasts in the children and pre-children categories.

In 2018 she started her own project at Club Atlético Quilmes in the city of Villa Allende. There he created a rhythmic gymnastics school where he works as a coach, she also teaches at the Club Rieles Argentinos in the city of Cordoba.
