= 1997 Pan American Gymnastics Championships =

International sports competition

The 1997 Pan American Gymnastics Championships were held in Medellín, Colombia, July 2–7, 1997.

== Medalists ==
=== Artistic gymnastics ===
Event	Gold	Silver	Bronze
Men
Team all-around	Cuba; Eric López; Francisco Diaz; Lazaro Lamelas; Yoandy Diaz	United States; Sanjuan Jones; Michael Dutka; Aaron Cotter; Jay Thornton	Colombia; Noé Rodríguez; Alexander Rangel; Jorge Giraldo; Leonardo González
Individual all-around	Eric López (CUB)	Francisco Diaz (CUB)	Lazaro Lamelas (CUB)
Floor exercise	Jay Thornton (USA)	Eric Pedercini (ARG)	Diego Lizardi (PUR)
Pommel horse	Eric López (CUB)	Jay Thornton (USA)	Jorge Giraldo (COL)
Rings	Diego Lizardi (PUR)	Eric López (CUB) Sergio Alvariño (ARG)	—
Vault	Lazaro Lamelas (CUB) Yoandy Diaz (CUB)	—	Pablo Capote (VEN)
Parallel bars	Eric López (CUB)	Francisco Diaz (CUB)	Jorge Giraldo (COL)
Horizontal bar	Aaron Cotter (USA)	Alexander Rangel (COL)	Lazaro Lamelas (CUB)
Women
Team all-around	Brazil; Daniele Hypólito; Mariana Gonçalves; Camila Comin; Marilia Gomes	United States; Erinn Dooley; Nicole Kilpatrick; Raegan Tomasek; Morgan White	Cuba; Leyanet Gonzalez
Individual all-around	Denisse López (MEX)	Leyanet Gonzalez (CUB)	Mariana Gonçalves (BRA)
Vault	Denisse López (MEX)	Brenda Magaña (MEX)	Leyanet Gonzalez (CUB)
Uneven bars	Daniele Hypólito (BRA)	Morgan White (USA)	Camila Comin (BRA)
Balance beam	Raegan Tomasek (USA)	Denisse López (MEX)	Leyanet Gonzalez (CUB)
Floor exercise	Daniele Hypólito (BRA)	Raegan Tomasek (USA)	Marilia Gomes (BRA)

=== Rhythmic gymnastics ===
Event	Gold	Silver	Bronze
Team all-around	Brazil; Camila Ferezin; Kizzy Antualpa; Dayane Camilo	Argentina; Sandra Re; Anahí Sosa	Cuba; Yordania Corrales; Yasleidis Rodriguez; Yamile Sotolongo
Individual all-around	Yordania Corrales (CUB)	Camila Ferezin (BRA)	Kizzy Antualpa (BRA)
Rope	Yordania Corrales (CUB)	Yasleidis Rodriguez (CUB)	Camila Ferezin (BRA)
Hoop	Yordania Corrales (CUB)	Kizzy Antualpa (BRA)	Sandra Re (ARG)
Clubs	Yordania Corrales (CUB) Dayane Camilo (BRA)	—	Kizzy Antualpa (BRA)
Ribbon	Kizzy Antualpa (BRA)	Sandra Re (ARG)	Yordania Corrales (CUB)

== Medal table ==
Rank	Nation	Gold	Silver	Bronze	Total
1	Cuba (CUB)	10	5	7	22
2	Brazil (BRA)	6	2	6	14
3	United States (USA)	3	5	0	8
4	Mexico (MEX)	2	2	0	4
5	Puerto Rico (PUR)	1	0	1	2
6	Argentina (ARG)	0	4	1	5
7	Colombia (COL)	0	1	3	4
8	Venezuela (VEN)	0	0	1	1
Totals (8 entries)		22	19	19	60
