= 2001 Pan American Gymnastics Championships =

International sports competition

The 2001 Pan American Gymnastics Championships were held in Cancún, Mexico, October 2–7, 2001. The event was originally scheduled for September 18-23, but the competition was postponed due to the September 11 attacks.

== Medalists ==
=== Artistic gymnastics ===
Event	Gold	Silver	Bronze
Men
Team all-around	Cuba; Eric López; Charles Tamayo; Lazaro Lamelas; Michel Brito	United States; Todd Thornton; Kris Zimmerman; Guard Young; Daniel Diaz-Luong	Puerto Rico; Luis Vargas; Diego Lizardi
Individual all-around	Eric López (CUB)	Charles Tamayo (CUB)	Luis Vargas (PUR)
Floor exercise	Michel Conceição (BRA)	Eric López (CUB) Michel Brito (CUB)	—N/a
Pommel horse	Luis Vargas (PUR)	Eric López (CUB)	Carycel Briceno (VEN)
Rings	Eric López (CUB)	Charles Tamayo (CUB)	Regulo Carmona (VEN)
Vault	Charles Tamayo (CUB)	Eric López (CUB)	Todd Thornton (USA)
Parallel bars	Eric López (CUB)	Jorge Giraldo (COL)	Kris Zimmerman (USA)
Horizontal bar	Jesús Romero (COL)	Lazaro Lamelas (CUB)	Luis Vargas (PUR)
Women
Team all-around	United States; Tasha Schwikert; Mohini Bhardwaj; Tabitha Yim; Katie Heenan	Brazil; Daiane dos Santos; Daniele Hypólito; Camila Comin; Heine Araújo	Cuba; Janerki de la Peña; Leyanet Gonzalez; Yumaili Aguilar; Mónica La Rosa
Individual all-around	Tasha Schwikert (USA)	Mohini Bhardwaj (USA)	Tabitha Yim (USA)
Vault	Janerki de la Peña (CUB)	Tasha Schwikert (USA)	Daiane dos Santos (BRA)
Uneven bars	Tasha Schwikert (USA)	Katie Heenan (USA)	Romina Mazzoni (ARG)
Balance beam	Tabitha Yim (USA)	Tasha Schwikert (USA)	Camila Comin (BRA)
Floor exercise	Daiane dos Santos (BRA)	Tasha Schwikert (USA)	Daniele Hypólito (BRA)

=== Rhythmic gymnastics ===
Event	Gold	Silver	Bronze
Team all-around	United States; Shayna Javornicky; Olga Karmansky; Stefanie Croyle	Mexico; Aicela Rosado; Maria Gamboa; Effy Lugo	Argentina; Anahí Sosa; Antonella Yacobelli; Romina Rosensajn
Individual all-around	Olga Karmansky (USA)	Shayna Javornicky (USA)	Aicela Rosado (MEX)
Group all-around	Brazil	Cuba	Argentina Venezuela
Ball	Aicela Rosado (MEX)	Maria Gamboa (MEX)	Olga Karmansky (USA)
Clubs	Anahí Sosa (ARG)	Aicela Rosado (MEX)	Shayna Javornicky (USA)
Hoop	Olga Karmansky (USA)	Anahí Sosa (ARG)	Stefanie Croyle (USA)
Rope	Aicela Rosado (MEX)	Anahí Sosa (ARG)	Olga Karmansky (USA)
Group ropes and balls	Brazil	Cuba	Argentina
Group clubs	Brazil	Cuba	Argentina

== Medal table ==
Rank	Nation	Gold	Silver	Bronze	Total
1	United States (USA)	7	7	7	21
2	Cuba (CUB)	6	10	1	17
3	Brazil (BRA)	5	1	3	9
4	Mexico (MEX)	2	3	1	6
5	Argentina (ARG)	1	2	5	8
6	Colombia (COL)	1	1	0	2
7	Puerto Rico (PUR)	1	0	3	4
8	Venezuela (VEN)	0	0	3	3
Totals (8 entries)		23	24	23	70
