= David Sender =

American artistic gymnast

- Full name: David Sender
- Born: August 27, 1985 (age 41)

Gymnastics career
- Discipline: Men's artistic gymnastics
- Country represented: United States (2004–2009, 2012–2013)
- College team: Stanford Cardinal
- Gym: Team Hilton HHonors; Buffalo Grove Gymnastics Center
- Head coach: Justin Spring
- Former coach: Thom Glielmi
- Retired: c. 2013
Medal record
Men's artistic gymnastics
Representing United States
| Event | 1st | 2nd | 3rd |
|---|---|---|---|
| Pan American Games | 0 | 0 | 1 |
| Pacific Alliance Championships | 0 | 0 | 1 |
| Total | 0 | 0 | 2 |
Pan American Games
| Bronze medal – third place | 2003 Santo Domingo | Team |
Pacific Alliance Championships
| Bronze medal – third place | 2006 Honolulu | Vault |

David Sender (born August 27, 1985) is a retired American artistic gymnast. He was a member of the United States men's national artistic gymnastics team and won two bronze medals competing internationally.

== Early life and education ==
Sender was born on August 27, 1985, to Ira and Bonnie Sender. He grew up in Arlington Heights, Illinois, and started gymnastics at the age of 5 at Buffalo Grove Gymnastics Center. He later enrolled at Stanford University to pursue gymnastics.

== Gymnastics career ==
Sender was a member of the Stanford Cardinal men's gymnastics team. He was the back-to-back NCAA vault champion at the 2006 and 2007 NCAA Men's Gymnastics Championships.

On the international stage, Sender represented the United States at the 2003 Pan American Games and won a bronze medal in the team all-around. He later won an individual bronze medal on the vault at the 2006 Pacific Alliance Gymnastics Championships and made the United States team for the 2006 World Artistic Gymnastics Championships.

Domestically, Sender was the all-around national champion at the 2008 U.S. National Gymnastics Championships.

An injury during warmups caused Sender to miss the 2008 United States Olympic trials. Despite an injury petition, Sender was not selected to the Olympic team.

In September 2009 after the 2009 U.S. National Gymnastics Championships, Sender declined a spot on the United States national team and announced his subsequent retirement. He later took up the sport again and trained with Justin Spring at the University of Illinois Urbana-Champaign while doing veterinary school. He took a one-year leave of absence from his graduate school. In another attempt to make the Olympics, he made the national team again in 2012. Despite placing second on vault at the 2012 United States Olympic trials, he was not selected.
