= David Durante =

American artistic gymnast

- Full name: David Luca Durante
- Born: June 26, 1980 (age 46)
- Height: 5 ft 5 in (165 cm)

Gymnastics career
- Discipline: Men's artistic gymnastics
- Country represented: United States (2002–2009)
- College team: Stanford Cardinal
- Gym: USOTC; Team Chevron; Team Gattaca; Surgent's Elite School of Gymnastics
- Head coach: Vitaly Marinich
- Retired: c. 2009
Medal record
Men's artistic gymnastics
Representing United States
Event	1st	2nd	3rd
Pan American Games	0	1	2
Pan American Championships	1	0	0
Total	1	1	2
Pan American Games
Silver medal – second place	2003 Santo Domingo	All-around
Bronze medal – third place	2003 Santo Domingo	Team
Bronze medal – third place	2007 Rio de Janeiro	Team
Pan American Championships
Gold medal – first place	2005 Rio de Janeiro	Team

David Luca Durante (born June 26, 1980) is a retired American artistic gymnast. He was a member of the United States men's national artistic gymnastics team and was one of the three alternates to the 2008 Summer Olympics. He competed at the 2007 World Artistic Gymnastics Championships and was a member of the 4th-place-finishing American team. He was the 2007 U.S. All-Around champion.

Raised in Garwood, New Jersey, Durante attended Arthur L. Johnson High School in Clark, New Jersey, before graduating from Stanford University in 2002 with a major in human biology and a minor in psychology.

Durante holds dual American-Italian citizenship.
