= Brenda Magaña =

Mexican artistic gymnast

Personal information
- Born: 27 July 1977 (age 49) Guadalajara, Mexico

Sport
- Club: World Olympic Gymnastics Academy
- Coached by: Bogomil Ivanov
Medal record
Women's artistic gymnastics
Representing Mexico
Pacific Rim Championships
Silver medal – second place	1998 Winnipeg	Vault
Pan American Games
Silver medal – second place	2003 Santo Domingo	Floor
Bronze medal – third place	2003 Santo Domingo	Vault
Pan American Championships
Silver medal – second place	1997 Medellín	Vault

Brenda Vianey Magaña Almaral (born 27 July 1977, in Guadalajara, Jalisco) is a Mexican artistic gymnast. Magana is best known for being the first woman to successfully complete a triple back somersault dismount from the uneven bars at a World Championships or Olympics, which she did at the 2002 World Artistic Gymnastics Championships in Debrecen, Hungary.

She began practicing gymnastics at the age of three at the Club Deportivo Atlas Paradero in Guadalajara but then started training at WOGA Gymnastics in Texas, United States. She was five years old when she participated in her first international competition in Czechoslovakia.

== Eponymous skill ==
Magaña has the triple back somersault dismount off the uneven bars named after her in the Code of Points.

Apparatus	Name	Description	Difficulty (Note: Valid for the 2025–2028 Code of Points)	Added to the Code of Points
Uneven bars	Magaña	Swing forward to triple back salto tucked	G (0.7)	2002 World Championships
