= Denisse López =

Mexican artistic gymnast

- Full name: Denisse López Sing
- Born: December 8, 1976 (age 49) Mexicali, Mexico

Gymnastics career
- Discipline: Women's artistic gymnastics
- Country represented: Mexico
- Eponymous skills: López (Vault) - Yurchenko 1/2 On, Layout 1/2 Off
- Retired: 2001
Medal record
Representing Mexico
Summer Universiade
Gold medal – first place	1997 Sicily	Vault
Pacific Rim Championships
Gold medal – first place	2000 Christchurch	Vault
Pan American Championships
Gold medal – first place	1997 Medellín	All-around
Gold medal – first place	1997 Medellín	Vault
Silver medal – second place	1997 Medellín	Balance beam

Denisse López Sing (born December 8, 1976) is a retired Mexican gymnast. She was the first gymnast from Mexico ever to qualify for an event final at the World Gymnastics Championships and the Olympic Games.

Lopez began gymnastics at the age of seven in 1984. By 1987, she was competing in international meets as a junior, including the 1987 Puerto Rico Cup, where she won a bronze medal on the floor exercise. In 1990, Lopez nearly swept the Mexican national championships, placing second in the all-around and winning the titles on the balance beam, floor exercise and vault. She represented Mexico at the 1991 World Artistic Gymnastics Championships, but placed well out of the medals on every event.

Although Mexico did not qualify a full team for the 1992 Olympics, Lopez was able to compete as an individual. In the preliminary round of competition, she finished 80th in the all-around.

Following a five-year hiatus from the sport, Lopez made a highly successful return to competition in 1997, winning the all-around and vault titles at the '97 Pan American Championships. Over the next three years she would become known as a vault specialist, winning gold medals on the event at the 1997 World University Games, the 1999 Gymnix International, the 2000 Pacific Alliance Championships, the 2000 Cottbus Cup and the Copa Gimnastica. Even when she did not medal, she never finished lower than sixth on vault in any competition she entered.

At the 1999 World Artistic Gymnastics Championships in Tianjin, Lopez placed 50th in the all-around during the preliminary competition; however, she was also ranked third on the vault, qualifying for the event finals. Her eventual sixth-place finish was the highest ever for a Mexican gymnast in a major international competition, a record that stood for 19 years until Alexa Moreno won the bronze medal on vault at the 2018 world championships. Lopez attended her second Olympics in 2000 in Sydney. She competed only on vault, qualifying for the event finals and finishing in eighth place (she later moved up to seventh after Dong Fangxiao of China was disqualified for being underage).

Lopez competed in a few meets in 2001, including the Cottbus Cup and the French Telecom International, but was beset by injuries. She retired and, in 2002, graduated from University with a degree in psychology.
