= Camila Ferezin =

Brazilian rhythmic gymnast

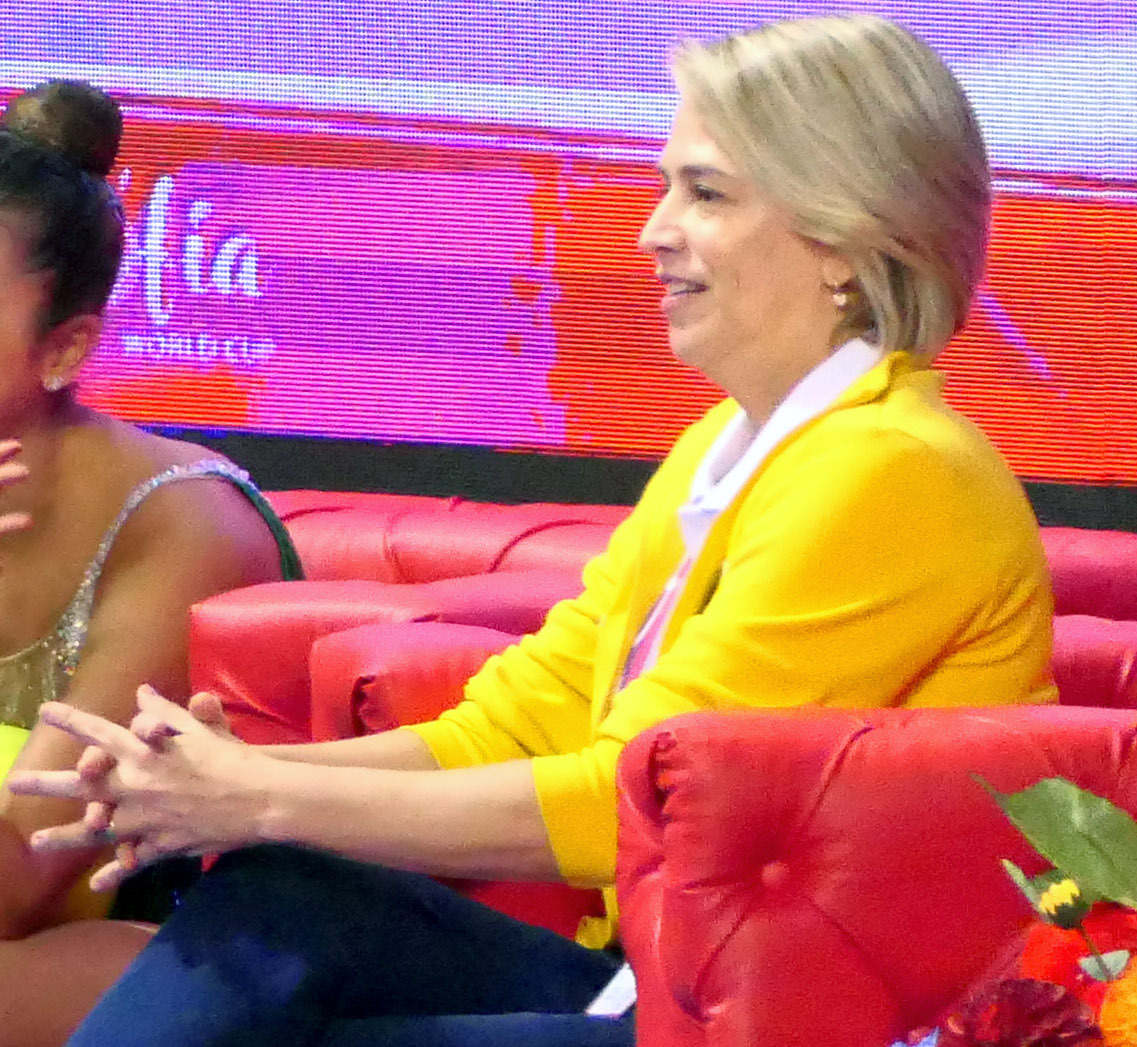
- Ferezin in 2024

Personal information
- Full name: Camila Ferezin do Amarante
- Born: 18 April 1977 (age 49) Londrina, Brazil
- Height: 168 cm (5 ft 6 in)
- Relatives: Alessandra Ferezin (sister)

Gymnastics career
- Discipline: Rhythmic gymnastics
- Country represented: Brazil; (1991-2000)
- Retired: yes
Medal record
Rhythmic gymnastics
Representing Brazil
Pan American Games
Gold medal – first place	1999 Winnipeg	Group all-Around
Bronze medal – third place	1995 Mar del Plata	Group all-Around
Pan American Championships
Gold medal – first place	1997 Medellín	Team
Silver medal – second place	1997 Medellín	All-Around
Bronze medal – third place	1997 Medellín	Rope

Camila Ferezin (born 18 April 1977) is a former rhythmic gymnast and the current coach of the Brazilian national senior group. In her gymnast career, she was a member of the group that won Brazil's first Pan American Games gold medal in 1999, she also competed at the 2000 Summer Olympics.

== Personal life ==
Ferezin married Ricardo Resende, the director of the Brazilian Gymnastics Federation. Their daughter, Maria Clara, was born in 2015 and is a promising rhythmic gymnast.

== Career ==
As a child Camila and her sister Alessandra, who would also be a member of the group at the 2000 Olympics, watched rhythmic gymnastics trainings while waiting for their parents to pick them up from school. Soon after she started training under Elizabeth Laffranchi in Londrina. In 1989 she was already national champion in groups.

Her first major appearance came in 1991, when she was called up to compete in the Pan American Games in Havana, even though she was still competing in the junior division. In the following edition in Mar del Plata she won the bronze medal in the group All-Around. She also took part in the 1997 Pan American Championships where she won team gold, silver in the All-Around and bronze with rope, later she was selected for the World Rhythmic Gymnastics Championships.

As a member of the group she won an historical gold medal at the 1999 Pan American Games in Winnipeg, the first ever in that competition for Brazil.

Ferezin went on to compete at the 2000 Olympic Games in Sydney in the group competition along Natália Scherer, Flávia de Faria, Alessandra Ferezin, Thalita Nakadomari and Dayane Camilo, they placed 7th in the qualifying round and 8th in the final.

After ending her career she studied Physical Education and was in the coaching staff of the Brazilian group at the 2004 Olympics in Athens. She became interim coach of the senior group in 2011 and soon after her pupils won the gold medal at the Pan American Games.

Since then the group achieved 14 golds, 5 silvers and 2 bronzes at the Pan American Championships, 8 golds, 1 silvers, 2 bronzes at the Pan American Games. In 2016 she guided the group at the Olympic Games in Rio de Janeiro, where they finished in 9th place. After conquering a bronze in 2013, Brazil's first ever World Cup medal, in 2023 the group won a gold, a silver and a bronze medal at the stage held in Cluj-Napoca, Romania.
