= Celeste Andrea Carnevale =

Argentine artistic gymnast (born 1985)

- Born: 25 August 1985 (age 41) Mataderos

Gymnastics career
- Discipline: Women's artistic gymnastics
- Country represented: Argentina (2004)

Celeste Andrea Carnevale (born 25 August 1985) is an Argentine artistic gymnast, representing her nation at international competitions.

She participated at the 2004 Summer Olympics.
