= Melanie Banville =

Canadian gymnast

Melanie Banville (now: Fournier)
- Nickname: Melanie Louise Banville
- Born: June 22, 1987 (age 39) Cornwall, Ontario, Canada

Gymnastics career
- Discipline: Women's artistic gymnastics
- Country represented: Canada

Melanie Louise Banville (born June 22, 1987) is a Canadian gymnast who competed at the 2004 Olympic Games in Athens, Greece.

Born in Cornwall, Ontario, Canada, she lived in nearby Long Sault, Ontario and trained in Ottawa, Ontario. Starting gymnastics at age five she was highly motivated by the competition at the 1996 Summer Olympics and then made it her goal to compete in the Olympic Games. Banville's twin brother Eric was also a gymnast.

After becoming known as one of Canada's best young gymnasts, Banville went to the 2004 Summer Olympics where she finished 24th in the individual all-round competition. Melanie's coaches at the Ottawa Gymnastics Center were Tobie Gorman, Lori Ierullo and Matthew Sparks. Matthew Sparks (currently head coach at Cirque du Soleil) also coached Melanie's twin brother Eric.
