= Heather Purnell =

Canadian gymnast

- Full name: Heather Mary Purnell
- Born: November 5, 1986 (age 39) Ottawa, Ontario

Gymnastics career
- Discipline: Women's artistic gymnastics
- Country represented: Canada
Medal record
Women's artistic gymnastics
Representing Canada
Commonwealth Games
Bronze medal – third place	2002 Manchester	Team

Heather Mary Purnell (born November 5, 1986) is a Canadian gymnast who represented Canada at the 2004 Olympic Games. She trained at Ottawa Gymnastics Centre with coaches Tobie Goreman and Lori Iurello and Matthew Sparks. In 1999 she was the Canadian All-Around Artistic Gymnastics Champion.
