= Larissa Barata =

Brazilian rhythmic gymnast (born 1987)

- Full name: Larissa Maia Barata
- Born: 31 March 1987 (age 39) Salvador, Bahia

Gymnastics career
- Discipline: Rhythmic gymnastics
- Country represented: Brazil (2003–2010 (?))

Larissa Maia Barata (born 31 March 1987) is a Brazilian group rhythmic gymnast. She participated at the 2004 Summer Olympics. She also competed at world championships, including at the 2010 World Rhythmic Gymnastics Championships.

== See also ==
- List of Olympic rhythmic gymnasts for Brazil
