= Pan American Artistic Gymnastics Championships – Women's floor =

Pan American woman gymnastics championship, since 1997

The Pan American Gymnastics Championships were first held in 1997.

Three medals are awarded: gold for first place, silver for second place, and bronze for third place.

== Medalists ==
Year	Location	Gold	Silver	Bronze	Ref
1997	(Colombia) Medellín	(Brazil) Daniele Hypólito	(United States) Raegan Tomasek	(Brazil) Marilia Gomes	
2001	(Mexico) Cancún	(Brazil) Daiane dos Santos	(United States) Tasha Schwikert	(Brazil) Daniele Hypólito	
2004	(Venezuela) Maracaibo	(United States) Alicia Sacramone	(United States) Melanie Sinclair	(Brazil) Thais Cevada	
2005	(Brazil) Rio de Janeiro	(United States) Alicia Sacramone	(Brazil) Daniele Hypólito	(United States) Jana Bieger	
2008	(Argentina) Rosario	(United States) Olivia Courtney	(United States) Corrie Lothrop	(Argentina) Virginia Deluzio	
2010	(Mexico) Guadalajara	(United States) McKayla Maroney	(United States) Kyla Ross	(Canada) Kristina Vaculik	
2012	(Colombia) Medellín	(Brazil) Daniele Hypólito	(Colombia) Bibiana Vélez (Chile) Barbara Achondo	—N/a	
2013	(Puerto Rico) San Juan	(Brazil) Daniele Hypólito	(Canada) Victoria Moors	(Cuba) Leidys Perdomo	
2014	(Canada) Mississauga	(United States) MyKayla Skinner	(Venezuela) Jessica López	(Cuba) Yesenia Ferrera	
2016	(Bolivia) Sucre	(Brazil) Milena Theodoro	(Puerto Rico) Nicole Diaz	(Argentina) Ailen Valente	
2017	(Peru) Lima	(Canada) Brooklyn Moors	(Canada) Laurie Denommée	(Mexico) Miriana Almeida	
2018	(Peru) Lima	(United States) Jade Carey	(Brazil) Flávia Saraiva	(United States) Kara Eaker	
2021	(Brazil) Rio de Janeiro	(Brazil) Ana Luiza Lima	(Brazil) Christal Bezerra	(Argentina) Abigail Magistrati	
2022	(Brazil) Rio de Janeiro	(United States) Kayla DiCello	(Brazil) Flávia Saraiva	(United States) Skye Blakely	
2023	(Colombia) Medellín	(United States) Joscelyn Roberson	(United States) Tiana Sumanasekera	(Mexico) Natalia Escalera	
2024	(Colombia) Santa Marta	(Argentina) Mia Mainardi	(Mexico) Michelle Pineda (Brazil) Hellen Silva	—N/a	
2025	Panama City	(Canada) Lia Monica Fontaine	(United States) Jayla Hang	(United States) Gabrielle Hardie	
2026	(Brazil) Rio de Janeiro	(United States) Claire Pease	(Canada) Lia Redick	(Argentina) Isabella Ajalla	

== Medal table ==
Rank	Nation	Gold	Silver	Bronze	Total
1	United States (USA)	9	7	4	20
2	Brazil (BRA)	6	5	3	14
3	Canada (CAN)	2	3	1	6
4	Argentina (ARG)	1	0	4	5
5	Mexico (MEX)	0	1	2	3
6	Chile (CHI)	0	1	0	1
6	Colombia (COL)	0	1	0	1
6	Puerto Rico (PUR)	0	1	0	1
6	Venezuela (VEN)	0	1	0	1
10	Cuba (CUB)	0	0	2	2
Totals (10 entries)		18	20	16	54
