= Pan American Artistic Gymnastics Championships – Women's uneven bars =

The Pan American Gymnastics Championships were first held in 1997.

Three medals are awarded: gold for first place, silver for second place, and bronze for third place.

== Medalists ==
Year	Location	Gold	Silver	Bronze	Ref
1997	(Colombia) Medellín	(Brazil) Daniele Hypólito	(United States) Morgan White	(Brazil) Camila Comin	
2001	(Mexico) Cancún	(United States) Tasha Schwikert	(United States) Katie Heenan	(Argentina) Romina Mazzoni	
2004	(Venezuela) Maracaibo	(United States) Chellsie Memmel	(United States) Melanie Sinclair	(Venezuela) Jessica López	
2005	(Brazil) Rio de Janeiro	(United States) Chellsie Memmel	(Brazil) Daniele Hypólito	(Brazil) Camila Comin	
2008	(Argentina) Rosario	(United States) Samantha Shapiro	(United States) Corrie Lothrop	(Brazil) Juliana Chaves Santos	
2010	(Mexico) Guadalajara	(United States) Gabby Douglas	(Venezuela) Jessica López	(Canada) Kristina Vaculik	
2012	(Colombia) Medellín	(Colombia) Bibiana Vélez	(Cuba) Dovélis Torres	(Mexico) Selene Vázquez	
2013	(Puerto Rico) San Juan	(Canada) Kaitlyn Hofland	(Venezuela) Jessica López	(Venezuela) Ivet Rojas	
2014	(Canada) Mississauga	(United States) Ashton Locklear	(United States) Madison Kocian	(Mexico) Ahtziri Sandoval	
2016	(Bolivia) Sucre	(Mexico) Nicolle Castro	(Colombia) Nathalia Sánchez	(Argentina) Ailen Valente	
2017	(Peru) Lima	(Canada) Jade Chrobok	(Mexico) Ahtziri Sandoval	(Canada) Brooklyn Moors	
2018	(Peru) Lima	(United States) Grace McCallum	(United States) Trinity Thomas	(Mexico) Nicolle Castro	
2021	(Brazil) Rio de Janeiro	(Brazil) Lorrane Oliveira	(Brazil) Christal Bezerra	(Mexico) Daniela Briceño	
2022	(Brazil) Rio de Janeiro	(Brazil) Rebeca Andrade	(United States) Zoe Miller	(Canada) Sydney Turner	
2023	(Colombia) Medellín	(United States) Nola Matthews	(United States) Addison Fatta	(Mexico) Natalia Escalera	
2024	(Colombia) Santa Marta	(Colombia) Daira Lamadrid	(Canada) Sydney Turner	(Argentina) Meline Mesropian	
2025	Panama City	(United States) Gabrielle Hardie	(United States) Jayla Hang	(Canada) Lia Monica Fontaine	
2026	(Brazil) Rio de Janeiro	(Canada) Aurélie Tran	(United States) Simone Rose	(Brazil) Sophia Weisberg	

== Medal table ==
Rank	Nation	Gold	Silver	Bronze	Total
1	United States (USA)	9	10	0	19
2	Brazil (BRA)	3	2	4	9
3	Canada (CAN)	3	1	4	8
4	Colombia (COL)	2	1	0	3
5	Mexico (MEX)	1	1	5	7
6	Venezuela (VEN)	0	2	2	4
7	Cuba (CUB)	0	1	0	1
8	Argentina (ARG)	0	0	3	3
Totals (8 entries)		18	18	18	54
