= Pacific Rim Championships – Women's uneven bars =

Three medals are awarded: gold for first place, silver for second place, and bronze for third place. Tie breakers have not been used in every year. In the event of a tie between two gymnasts, both names are listed, and the following position (second for a tie for first, third for a tie for second) is left empty because a medal was not awarded for that position. If three gymnastics tied for a position, the following two positions are left empty.

== Medalists ==
Year	Location	Gold	Silver	Bronze	Ref.
1998	(Canada) Winnipeg	(China) Huang Mandan	(United States) Elise Ray	(China) Rao Meizhen	
2000	(New Zealand) Christchurch	(China) Bai Chunyue	(United States) Elise Ray	(China) Ling Jie	
2002	(Canada) Vancouver	(China) Chen Miaojie	(United States) Tasha Schwikert	(Australia) Jacqui Dunn	
2004	(United States) Honolulu	(United States) Katie Heenan	(China) Zhang Yufei	(Australia) Allana Slater	
2006	(United States) Honolulu	(United States) Nastia Liukin	(United States) Shayla Worley	(Japan) Mayu Kuroda	
2008	(United States) San Jose	(United States) Jana Bieger	(Canada) Kristina Vaculik (United States) Nastia Liukin	-	
2010	(Australia) Melbourne	(China) Huang Qiushuang	(United States) Rebecca Bross	(Russia) Ksenia Afanasyeva	
2012	(United States) Everett	(United States) Gabby Douglas	(United States) Kyla Ross	(China) Luo Peiru	
2014	(Canada) Richmond	(United States) Elizabeth Price	(United States) Kyla Ross	(Australia) Georgia-Rose Brown	
2016	(United States) Everett	(United States) Ashton Locklear	(Australia) Larrissa Miller	(Canada) Brittany Rogers	
2018	(Colombia) Medellín	(Canada) Haley de Jong	(Mexico) Jimena Moreno	(Australia) Kate McDonald	
2024	(Colombia) Cali	(United States) Simone Rose	(Canada) Evandra Zlobec	(United States) Jayla Hang	
