= 2008 United States Olympic trials (gymnastics) =

2008 U.S. Olympic trials
- Venue: Wachovia Center
- Location: Philadelphia
- Date: June 19–22, 2008

The 2008 U.S. Olympic gymnastics team trials were held from June 19 to 22, 2008, at the Wachovia Center (now known as Wells Fargo Center) in Philadelphia.

== Venue ==
The Wachovia Center, which has a capacity of up to 20,478 spectators, is home to the Philadelphia Flyers, Philadelphia 76ers, and the Philadelphia Wings.

== Participants ==
The 13 national team gymnasts were invited to attend:

Name	Hometown	Club
Jana Bieger	Coconut Creek, FL	Bieger International
Mackenzie Caquatto	Naperville, IL	Aerials
Olivia Courtney	Orlando, FL	Orlando Metro
Ivana Hong	Blue Springs, MO	GAGE
Alaina Johnson	Tyler, TX	Texas East
Shawn Johnson	West Des Moines, IA	Chow's Gymnastics
Mattie Larson	Los Angeles, CA	All Olympia
Nastia Liukin	Parker, TX	WOGA
Corrie Lothrop	Gaithersburg, MD	Hill's Gymnastics
Chellsie Memmel	West Allis, WI	M&M Gymnastics
Samantha Peszek	Indianapolis, IN	DeVeau's
Alicia Sacramone	Winchester, MA	Brestyan's
Randy Stageberg	Chesapeake, VA	Excalibur

The following people were also invited to Olympic trials:

Name	Hometown	Club
Chelsea Davis	Lakeway, TX	Texas Dreams Gymnastics
Darling Hill	Mt. Laurel, NJ	Will-Moor
Britney Ranzy	Gaithersburg, MD	Excalibur
Amber Trani	Richlandtown, PA	Parkettes
Bridget Sloan	Pittsboro, IN	Sharp's
Shayla Worley	Orlando, FL	Orlando Metro

== Broadcast ==
NBC broadcast all nights of competition at the trials.

== Results ==
=== Final standings ===
Event	1st	2nd	3rd
Individual all-around	Shawn Johnson	Nastia Liukin	Chellsie Memmel
Vault	Alicia Sacramone	Shawn Johnson	Britney Ranzy
Uneven bars	Nastia Liukin	Chellsie Memmel	Jana Bieger
Balance beam	Shawn Johnson	Chellsie Memmel	Nastia Liukin
Floor	Shawn Johnson	Nastia Liukin Chellsie Memmel Samantha Peszek	N/A

=== Final scores ===
Full Olympic trial scores are as follows:

Rank	Gymnast	Vault (gymnastics)	Uneven bars	Balance beam	Floor (gymnastics)	Day Total	Total
1st place, gold medalist(s)	Shawn Johnson	15.950	15.700	16.250	16.100	64.000	127.650
1st place, gold medalist(s)	Shawn Johnson	15.900	15.350	16.200	16.200	63.650	127.650
2nd place, silver medalist(s)	Nastia Liukin	15.000	16.700	16.100	15.700	63.500	125.850
2nd place, silver medalist(s)	Nastia Liukin	14.800	16.150	15.850	15.450	62.350	125.850
3rd place, bronze medalist(s)	Chellsie Memmel	14.800	16.150	16.000	15.300	62.250	124.800
3rd place, bronze medalist(s)	Chellsie Memmel	14.200	16.400	16.100	15.850	62.550	124.800
4	Samantha Peszek	15.100	15.300	15.800	15.650	61.850	123.250
4	Samantha Peszek	15.150	15.200	15.800	15.550	61.400	123.250
5	Ivana Hong	14.800	15.200	15.700	15.150	60.850	120.950
5	Ivana Hong	14.800	15.550	14.450	15.300	60.100	120.950
6	Jana Bieger	14.600	15.650	15.250	14.600	60.100	120.600
6	Jana Bieger	14.650	15.700	15.450	14.700	60.500	120.600
7	Mattie Larson	14.800	15.100	14.400	15.250	59.550	119.700
7	Mattie Larson	14.700	14.900	15.050	15.500	60.150	119.700
8	Chelsea Davis	14.700	15.000	14.750	14.850	59.300	119.300
8	Chelsea Davis	14.600	15.00	14.750	14.850	60.000	119.300
9	Corrie Lothrop	14.900	14.950	14.600	14.950	59.400	119.150
9	Corrie Lothrop	14.900	14.950	15.000	14.900	59.750	119.150
10	Olivia Courtney	14.700	14.400	13.550	14.750	57.400	115.700
10	Olivia Courtney	14.700	14.250	14.450	14.900	58.300	115.700
11	Randy Stageberg	14.740	13.450	13.900	15.200	57.300	115.100
11	Randy Stageberg	14.950	13.900	14.550	14.400	57.800	115.100
12	Alaina Johnson	13.800	14.100	13.900	14.250	56.050	111.850
12	Alaina Johnson	13.500	14.000	13.900	14.400	55.800	111.850
13	Alicia Sacramone	15.900	–	15.650	15.400	46.950	94.150
13	Alicia Sacramone	16.000	–	15.500	15.700	47.200	94.150
14	Shayla Worley	14.600	15.400	14.800	–	44.800	89.100
14	Shayla Worley	14.700	14.200	15.400	–	44.300	89.100
15	Bridget Sloan	–	15.600	14.850	14.550	44.300	88.050
15	Bridget Sloan	–	14.500	14.250	14.300	43.050	88.050
16	Darling Hill	14.650	–	13.000	14.950	42.600	86.750
16	Darling Hill	14.500	–	14.450	15.200	43.100	86.750
17	Britney Ranzy	15.100	13.700	–	14.300	43.100	72.850
17	Britney Ranzy	15.250	–	–	14.500	29.750	72.850
18	Amber Trani	13.250	–	14.400	14.250	41.900	70.900
18	Amber Trani	–	–	14.650	14.350	29.000	70.900

== Olympic team selection ==
At the conclusion of the Olympic trials only Shawn Johnson and Nastia Liukin were named to the team to represent the USA at the 2008 Summer Olympics. The remaining members of the team were to be determined after a selection camp; attendees included: Jana Bieger, Chelsea Davis, Ivana Hong, Mattie Larson, Corrie Lothrop, Chellsie Memmel, Samantha Peszek, Alicia Sacramone, Bridget Sloan, and Shayla Worley. The camp concluded in mid-July with Memmel, Peszek, Sacramone, and Sloan being named to the team while Bieger, Hong, and Lothrop were named as the alternates.
