= Chellsie Memmel =

American artistic gymnast (born 1988)

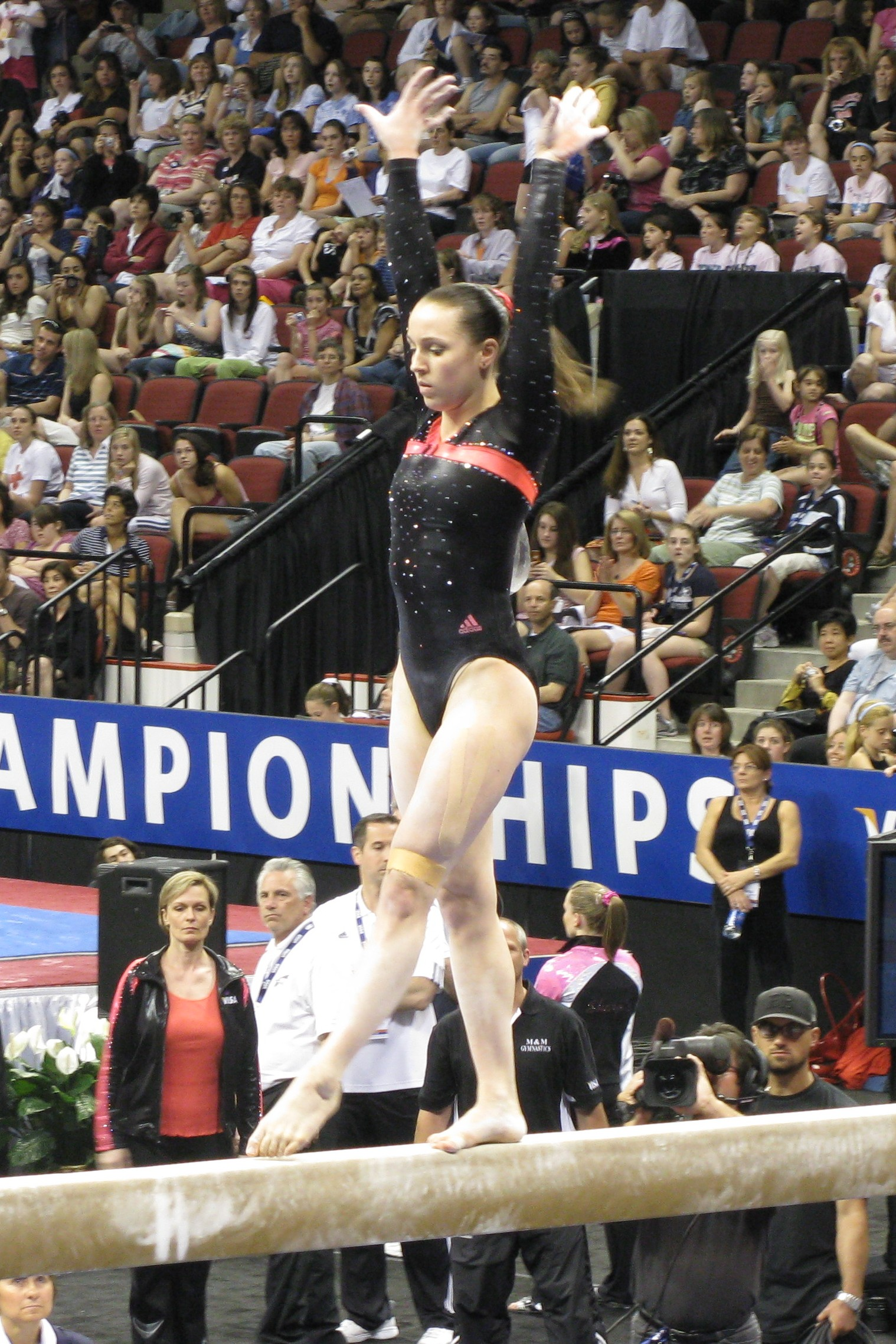
- Memmel performing on the balance beam at the 2008 U.S. National Championships

Personal information
- Full name: Chellsie Marie Memmel
- Born: June 23, 1988 (age 38) West Allis, Wisconsin, U.S.
- Height: 5 ft 2.5 in (159 cm)
- Spouse: Kory Maier (m. 2013)

Gymnastics career
- Discipline: Women's artistic gymnastics
- Country represented: United States; (2000, 2002–09, 2011–12)
- Gym: M&M Gymnastics
- Head coach: Andy Memmel
- Eponymous skills: Memmel Turn (Floor Routine): Double turn with leg fully extended in a "Y"
Medal record
Women's artistic gymnastics
Representing United States
Olympic Games
Silver medal – second place	2008 Beijing	Team
World Championships
Gold medal – first place	2003 Anaheim	Team
Gold medal – first place	2003 Anaheim	Uneven Bars
Gold medal – first place	2005 Melbourne	All-Around
Silver medal – second place	2005 Melbourne	Uneven Bars
Silver medal – second place	2005 Melbourne	Balance Beam
Silver medal – second place	2006 Aarhus	Team
World Cup Final
Gold medal – first place	2004 Birmingham	Uneven Bars
Pan American Games
Gold medal – first place	2003 Santo Domingo	Team
Gold medal – first place	2003 Santo Domingo	All-Around
Gold medal – first place	2003 Santo Domingo	Uneven Bars
Bronze medal – third place	2003 Santo Domingo	Balance Beam
Pan American Championships
Gold medal – first place	2004 Maracaibo	Uneven Bars
Gold medal – first place	2004 Maracaibo	Balance Beam
Gold medal – first place	2005 Rio de Janeiro	Team
Gold medal – first place	2005 Rio de Janeiro	All-Around
Gold medal – first place	2005 Rio de Janeiro	Uneven Bars
Gold medal – first place	2005 Rio de Janeiro	Balance Beam
Pacific Rim Championships
Gold medal – first place	2006 Honolulu	Team
Gold medal – first place	2006 Honolulu	All-Around
Gold medal – first place	2006 Honolulu	Balance Beam
Silver medal – second place	2006 Honolulu	Floor Exercise

Chellsie Marie Memmel (born June 23, 1988) is an American artistic gymnast. She is the 2005 world all-around champion (the third American woman, after Kim Zmeskal and Shannon Miller, to win that title) and the 2003 world champion on the uneven bars. She was a member of the United States women's gymnastics team at the 2008 Olympics in Beijing, China.

With a total of seven World Championship and Olympic medals, Memmel is tied with Shawn Johnson as the ninth most decorated American female gymnast, behind Simone Biles (41), Shannon Miller (16), Nastia Liukin (14), Alicia Sacramone (11), Aly Raisman (10), Jade Carey (10), Sunisa Lee (9), and Dominique Dawes (8).

Her return to gymnastics in her 30s attracted attention to the idea that by avoiding over-training and mistreatment, gymnasts could continue to perform at a high level in adulthood. She was inducted into the International Gymnastics Hall of Fame in 2022.

== Early life ==
Chellsie Marie Memmel was born in West Allis, Wisconsin, to Andy and Jeanelle Memmel. Both of her parents were gymnastics coaches, and they encouraged her to play around in the gym and taught her basic skills. When she was eight years old, she started training with Jim Chudy at Salto Gymnastics.

She began competing at the junior elite level in 2000.

== Gymnastics career ==
=== 2003 ===
Memmel became a senior international elite gymnast in 2003. She placed third at the National Podium Meet and the American Classic, and was invited to compete at the Pacific Challenge, a three-country tournament with Canada and Australia. At that competition, she won the all-around.

At the 2003 U.S. National Championships, Memmel was coming off of a hamstring injury that had limited her training time. She made mistakes during her floor exercise routine on both days and placed tenth in the all-around. At a national team selection camp several weeks later, she was chosen to compete at the Pan American Games, but not at the World Championships.

She won four medals at the Pan American Games, including gold in the all-around and on the uneven bars. During this time, the gymnasts who had been chosen for the World Championships team were dealing with injuries and illnesses: Annia Hatch tore her ACL, Ashley Postell had the flu, and Courtney Kupets tore her Achilles tendon. Memmel was an alternate to the World Championships, along with Samantha Sheehan and Terin Humphrey, and National Team Coordinator Márta Károlyi chose her and Humphrey to step in and compete. Memmel flew from the Pan American Games in Santo Domingo directly to the World Championships in Anaheim, California.

Memmel led the American team in the preliminary round at Worlds, qualifying to the all-around final in second place, and first among her teammates. In the team finals, she was the only American to compete on every event, and had the highest all-around score. The U.S. finished on top, winning the country's first team gold medal at the World Championships, despite competing with only five gymnasts instead of six. In the all-around final, she finished in eighth place.

In the event finals, Memmel became a world champion on the uneven bars, tying with teammate Hollie Vise. She also placed sixth on the balance beam after falling on her Arabian.

=== 2004 ===
In 2004, Memmel competed at the American Cup and placed third, behind U.S. teammates Carly Patterson and Courtney McCool. During a national team training camp in April, she broke a metatarsal bone in her foot and she was unable to compete at the National Championships or the Olympic Trials. She petitioned for a chance to compete at the Olympic team selection camp and was ultimately named as an alternate to the U.S. team for the 2004 Olympics. Later in the year, Memmel won the uneven bars title at the 2004 World Cup Final.

=== 2005 ===
Memmel began the 2005 season at the American Cup, which did not have an all-around competition that year. She won the uneven bars title and placed third on beam.

She placed fourth in the all-around at the U.S. Classic and won the silver medal in the all-around at the National Championships, behind Nastia Liukin. She was named to the U.S. team for the Pan American Championships, where she won the all-around title and individual gold medals on beam and bars.

Memmel was named to the 2005 World Championships team, along with Liukin, Alicia Sacramone, and Jana Bieger. At Worlds, she won the all-around title by 0.001 over Liukin. This made her the third American woman, and the first since 1994, to win the all-around at the World Championships. She also won silver medals on balance beam and uneven bars.

After her success at the 2005 Worlds, Memmel decided to turn professional, thereby giving up her NCAA eligibility.

=== 2006 ===
Memmel began 2006 at the Pacific Alliance Championships, where she tied with Liukin in the all-around. She injured her shoulder while training a bail at the competition, and decided not to attend the U.S. Classic. Two weeks later, she competed at the National Championships where she placed fourth in the all-around.

At the World Championships, Memmel qualified first for the all-around finals and also made the uneven bars and floor event finals. In the team final, she re-aggravated her shoulder injury on her bail, and faltered on the balance beam when she landed a front tuck with one foot completely off the beam. She withdrew from the all-around and event finals because of her injury.

=== 2007 ===
Memmel was still recovering from her shoulder injury in August 2007, when the National Championships were held. She competed only on floor exercise on the first day of the competition, and did not compete at the 2007 World Championships.

She made her all-around comeback at the Good Luck Beijing International Invitational, a test meet for the 2008 Olympic Games in which the gymnasts competed in the same arena and on the same equipment that would be used at the Olympics. Memmel placed fifth in the all-around and third on beam, where she performed new skills, including a front aerial to prone mount. She did not qualify to the uneven bars final.

After the Beijing test event, Memmel competed at the Toyota Cup in Toyota, Japan, where she won the gold medal on floor exercise and the silver on balance beam.

=== 2008 ===
In June 2008, Memmel placed third in the all-around at the National Championships, behind Liukin and Shawn Johnson. She competed a new, upgraded floor routine that included the Dos Santos skill she had competed in earlier years.

At the U.S. Olympic Trials, held two weeks after Nationals, she performed well on bars and beam, received a standing ovation for her floor routine on the second night of competition, and was named to the Olympic team selection camp at the Karolyi Ranch in New Waverly, Texas. At the camp, despite giving herself whiplash and having to stop in the middle of her floor routine, she competed on beam later the same day. On the final day of the selection camp, she landed a double-twisting Yurchenko vault for the first time in competition since 2006. She was named to the Olympic team along with Johnson, Liukin, Samantha Peszek, Sacramone, and Bridget Sloan.

On August 3, 2008, USA Gymnastics announced that Memmel had suffered a minor ankle injury during training in Beijing and would compete only on the uneven bars. She fell in the preliminary round but performed a clean routine in the team finals. Later, it was revealed that she had competed on a broken ankle, a more serious injury than previously disclosed.

=== 2011 ===
On July 23, 2011, Memmel returned to competition at the U.S. Classic in Chicago, where she won the silver medal in the all-around with a total score of 56.95. She placed fourth on floor (13.65) and fifth on balance beam (14.7), and tied with Bridgette Caquatto for fifth on vault (14.2).

At the National Championships in Saint Paul, Minnesota, in August, Memmel earned the silver medal on balance beam with a two-night score of 30. She finished night one of the competition in third place all-around (57.35), with a first-place finish on beam (15.25). On night two, she slipped to an eighth-place finish in the all-around (109.85) after she dislocated her shoulder during her bars routine and did not finish the routine.

She took part in two Worlds selection camps at the Karolyi Ranch, but, as in 2003, she was named to the Pan American Games team instead of the World Championships team. She subsequently withdrew from the Pan American Games team to continue rehabilitating her injured shoulder. Soon after her return from the second selection camp, she underwent surgery to repair a torn biceps tendon near her right shoulder.

=== 2012 ===
Memmel underwent a second surgery on her shoulder in February and resumed training shortly thereafter to try to make the 2012 Olympic team. She competed only on balance beam at the U.S. Classic, and fell twice, scoring an 11.95. The selection committee declined her petition to compete at the National Championships.

On November 14, 2012, Memmel announced her then-retirement from gymnastics.

=== 2020 comeback ===
In April 2020, Memmel began more structured training (Note: As seen on her YouTube channel.) after posting a video on social media of herself performing her double pike beam dismount with a message saying “the seed has been planted.” Memmel confirmed her comeback as an elite gymnast on July 31 via YouTube.

Memmel made her elite competition comeback at the 2021 U.S. Classic in May. Memmel competed on vault, scoring an 13.750, and balance beam, scoring an 11.800. This was Memmel's first competition in nine years. In August, Memmel announced that she would be joining Simone Biles' Gold Over America Tour.

== USA Gymnastics career ==
In May 2022, Memmel was named "technical lead" for the U.S. National women's artistic gymnastics team. In this role, she works with the top gymnasts to design routines that maximize their potential scores under the current code of points. She also chooses which gymnasts compete on which events in team competitions, helping coach the U.S. team to gold at the 2022 and 2023 World Championships and the 2024 Olympic Games.

== Personal life ==
Memmel married Kory Maier, a mechanical engineer, in August 2013. They have two children: a son born in February 2015 and a daughter born in November 2017.

== Routines and skills ==
=== Eponymous skill ===
Memmel has one eponymous skill listed in the Code of Points.

Apparatus	Name	Description	Difficulty (Note: Valid for the 2025–2028 Code of Points)	Notes
Floor exercise	Memmel	2/1 turn (720°) with free leg held upward in 180° split position	D (0.4)	Also referred to as a double Y turn

=== Competitive routines ===
Memmel performed the following skills in competition (difficulty values from the 2005–08 Code of Points)

==== Vault ====
Double-twisting Yurchenko (2005–06, 2021; 5.8 difficulty); 1.5-twisting Yurchenko (2003, 2007–09; 5.4 difficulty); full-twisting Yurchenko (2011, 2021; 5.0 difficulty)

==== Uneven bars ====
Jump to mount on high bar; kip, cast to handstand (KCH) (B) + clear hip circle to Tkatchev (Hindorff) (E) + Pak salto (D); KCH (B) + stalder Shaposhnikova (Chow) (D) + overshoot to handstand (D) + stalder shoot up to high bar (Ray) (C); KCH (B) + toe-on circle (C) + giant 1/1 (C) + Tkatchev (D); KCH (B) + giant 1/2 (B) + jam to handstand (Luo) (E) + tucked double front dismount (D). 7.0 difficulty.

==== Balance beam ====
Stoop to rear support mount (A); split jump (A) + wolf jump (A); piked Barani (front pike 1/2, takeoff from two feet) (Memmel) (F); switch split leap (C) + back tuck (C); standing Arabian (F); illusion turn (D); front tuck (D) + back handspring step-out (B) + layout step-out (C); front aerial walkover (D); free aerial cartwheel (D); round-off (B) + double pike dismount (E). 6.9 difficulty.

==== Floor exercise ====
Round-off + back handspring + piked Arabian double front (Dos Santos I) (F); round-off + back handspring + double layout (F); double turn with leg held in split (Memmel) (D); switch split ring leap (C) + split leap 1/1 (C); round-off + back handspring + back layout 5/2 (D) + front layout (B); straddle jump 3/2 (C); round-off + back handspring + back layout 2/1 (C); round-off + back handspring + double pike (D). 6.3 difficulty.

== Competitive history ==
Competitive history of Chellsie Memmel at the junior level
Year	Event	Team	AA	VT	UB	BB	FX
2000	American Classic		7				
2000	Puerto Rico Cup		1st place, gold medalist(s)		2nd place, silver medalist(s)	1st place, gold medalist(s)	1st place, gold medalist(s)
2000	USA vs. France	1st place, gold medalist(s)	2nd place, silver medalist(s)				
2002	American Classic		10			4	8
2002	USA/Belgium	1st place, gold medalist(s)	1st place, gold medalist(s)	3rd place, bronze medalist(s)	1st place, gold medalist(s)	2nd place, silver medalist(s)	1st place, gold medalist(s)
2002	Intl Gymnastics Championships	1st place, gold medalist(s)			3rd place, bronze medalist(s)		
2002	Podium Meet					9	4
2002	U.S. Classic		4		9	3rd place, bronze medalist(s)	3rd place, bronze medalist(s)
2002	USA Gymnastics Championships		3rd place, bronze medalist(s)		5	3rd place, bronze medalist(s)	2nd place, silver medalist(s)
2002	USA/Mexico Friendship Competition	1st place, gold medalist(s)	3rd place, bronze medalist(s)				2nd place, silver medalist(s)

Competitive history of Chellsie Memmel at the senior level
Year	Event	Team	AA	VT	UB	BB	FX
2003	American Classic		3rd place, bronze medalist(s)		1st place, gold medalist(s)	1st place, gold medalist(s)	
2003	Pacific Challenge (USA/CAN/AUS)	1st place, gold medalist(s)			1st place, gold medalist(s)		
2003	National Podium Meet		3rd place, bronze medalist(s)	5	5		2nd place, silver medalist(s)
2003	USA Gymnastics Championships		10		7	6	
2003	Pan American Games	1st place, gold medalist(s)	1st place, gold medalist(s)		1st place, gold medalist(s)	3rd place, bronze medalist(s)	
2003	World Championships	1st place, gold medalist(s)	8		1st place, gold medalist(s)	6	
2004	American Cup		3rd place, bronze medalist(s)				
2004	Pan American Championships				1st place, gold medalist(s)	1st place, gold medalist(s)	
2004	World Cup Final				1st place, gold medalist(s)		
2005	American Cup				1st place, gold medalist(s)	3rd place, bronze medalist(s)	
2005	USA/SUI	1st place, gold medalist(s)		1st place, gold medalist(s)	2nd place, silver medalist(s)	3rd place, bronze medalist(s)	
2005	USA/GBR	1st place, gold medalist(s)			1st place, gold medalist(s)		
2005	Pan American Championships	1st place, gold medalist(s)	1st place, gold medalist(s)		1st place, gold medalist(s)	1st place, gold medalist(s)	
2005	U.S. Classic		4	7	3rd place, bronze medalist(s)	2nd place, silver medalist(s)	14
2005	USA Gymnastics Championships		2nd place, silver medalist(s)		2nd place, silver medalist(s)	2nd place, silver medalist(s)	3rd place, bronze medalist(s)
2005	World Championships		1st place, gold medalist(s)		2nd place, silver medalist(s)	2nd place, silver medalist(s)	
2006	Pacific Alliance Championships	1st place, gold medalist(s)	1st place, gold medalist(s)			1st place, gold medalist(s)	2nd place, silver medalist(s)
2006	USA Gymnastics Championships		4		5	4	3rd place, bronze medalist(s)
2006	World Championships	2nd place, silver medalist(s)					
2007	U.S. Classic			5			
2007	Good Luck Beijing Intl Tournament		5			3rd place, bronze medalist(s)	3rd place, bronze medalist(s)
2007	Toyota Cup					2nd place, silver medalist(s)	1st place, gold medalist(s)
2008	Friendship International Exchange		3rd place, bronze medalist(s)		1st place, gold medalist(s)	5	
2008	USA Gymnastics Championships		3rd place, bronze medalist(s)		2nd place, silver medalist(s)	4	4
2008	Olympic Trials		3rd place, bronze medalist(s)		2nd place, silver medalist(s)	2nd place, silver medalist(s)	2nd place, silver medalist(s)
2008	Olympic Games	2nd place, silver medalist(s)					
2009	USA Gymnastics Championships					8	
2011	U.S. Classic		2nd place, silver medalist(s)	5	6	5	4
2011	U.S. National Championships		8			2nd place, silver medalist(s)	6
2012	U.S. Classic					21	
2021	U.S. Classic					29	
2021	U.S. National Championships				26	13	
