= United States Olympic trials (gymnastics) =

The United States Olympic team trials in gymnastics are held before every Summer Olympic Games to select the participants for the US Olympic gymnastics team. The event is overseen by the United States Olympic Committee and run by USA Gymnastics.

The first Olympic trials were held in 1960 in West Point, New York, to select athletes for the 1960 Summer Olympics in Rome, Italy. The men's and women's trials have been held both separately and then as one event. Many of the early results are hard to come by as they were not recorded or published to the public.

== Editions ==
Year	Location	Dates	Women's champion	Men's champion	Notes	Ref
1960	West Point, New York					
1964	San Fernando, California (MAG); Kings Point, New York (WAG)					
1968	Los Angeles, California (MAG); Long Beach, California (WAG)					
1972	Des Plaines, Illinois (MAG); Long Beach, California (WAG)	May 26–28	Roxanne Pierce	Steve Hug		
1976	University Park, Pennsylvania (MAG); Los Angeles, California (WAG)	May 20–22	Kathy Howard	Kurt Thomas		
1980	Jacksonville, Florida		Tracee Talavera	Bart Conner	Olympic trials were held and teams for both MAG and WAG were selected; however the USA boycotted the Olympics.	
1984	Jacksonville, Florida	June 1–3	Mary Lou Retton	Peter Vidmar		
1988	Salt Lake City, Utah	August 4–7	Phoebe Mills	Charles Lakes		
1992	Baltimore, Maryland	June 9–14	Shannon Miller	Scott Keswick		
1996	Boston, Massachusetts	June 25–30	Dominique Dawes	John Roethlisberger		
2000	Boston, Massachusetts	August 17–20	Elise Ray	Blaine Wilson		
2004	Anaheim, California	June 24–27	Courtney Kupets	Paul Hamm		
2008	Philadelphia, Pennsylvania	June 19–22	Shawn Johnson	Jonathan Horton		
2012	San Jose, California	June 28–July 1	Gabby Douglas	Danell Leyva		
2016	St. Louis, Missouri (MAG); San Jose, California (WAG)	June 23–26; July 8–10	Simone Biles	Sam Mikulak		
2020	St. Louis, Missouri	~~June 25–28, 2020~~; June 24–27, 2021	Simone Biles	Brody Malone	Postponed due to the COVID-19 pandemic	
2024	Minneapolis, Minnesota	June 27–30	Simone Biles	Fred Richard		
2028	Louisville, Kentucky	June 16–19	TBD	TBD		

== See also ==
- American Cup
- USA National Championships
- U.S. Classic
- Winter Cup
- Gymnastics at the Summer Olympics
