= Darlene Hill =

American artistic gymnast

Darling Hill
- Full name: Darling Princess Hill
- Born: September 24, 1989 (age 36) Newark, New Jersey

Gymnastics career
- Discipline: Women's artistic gymnastics
- Country represented: United States (2007-2008)
- Club: Will-Moor
- Head coach: Kim Bonus
- Retired: 2009

Darling Princess Hill (formerly Darlene Hill) (born September 24, 1989) is a retired American artistic gymnast. She was at the height of her career in 2008 and competed at the 2008 Olympic trials.

== Early life ==
Hill was born on September 24, 1989, in Newark, New Jersey, to parents, Tyrone Dixon and Vivian Hill. Three days after her birth, Darling's grandmother, Elouise Dixon, travelled to the hospital and took her home to Mount Laurel; to live with her. Soon after, Dixon took home Darling's younger sister, Melissa. Throughout Dixon's lifetime, she had raised twelve children; ten of whom were her own. Throughout Hill's childhood, her father occasionally visited her but she was yet to reunite with her mother, who lived in Newark. Hill sent information to her mother via her cousins. She would call to tell them when she won a meet or when she made the national team. She also sent her cousins a DVD of her gymnastics, so they could give it to her mother. Speaking out on her upbringing, Hill has stated, "although we didn't have money, we thought we were the richest people in the world!" and has stated that her grandmother was 'rich in spirit'.

In 1993, at the age of four, Dixon enrolled Hill in gymnastics classes at Will-Moor School of Gymnastics, following a stint of doing dance classes. Instantly, her coach, Kim Bonus, found raw talent in Hill, saying, "I knew she had it! She had the sport, she had the power, she had the grace; she had it all!". In 2003, at the age of 13, she won the Level 9 Eastern National all-around title.

== Gymnastics career ==
=== 2004-06: Level 10 and early Senior International Elite career ===
In 2004, Hill moved up to Level 10. At J.O. Nationals, she was the all-around champion for the Junior B division. Following her achievement at Nationals, she was added to the 2004 J.O National team. Later, in May 2004, she participated in the U.S. Classic as a Pre-Elite gymnast. She was third in the all-around.

=== 2007-08: Later Senior International Elite career, 2008 Olympic Trials ===
Hill returned for the 2007 season, following the recovery from her injury. She finished third in the all-around and on bars at the U.S. Classic; her best placement in domestic competition. At Nationals, Darlene placed ninth in the all-around after two days of competition. This result earned Hill a place on the 2007-08 U.S. National team. Hill attended the selection camp for the 2007 World Artistic Gymnastics Championships team but wasn't named to the team. However, in November, she was selected to compete at the 2007 Glasgow Grand Prix at the Kelvin Hall in Glasgow, Scotland; along with Natasha Kelley. In the qualification round, Darling scored 14.650 on bars and 13.050 on beam. She advanced to the uneven bars final but missed qualification to the beam final by one spot. In the bars final, she placed fourth with a score of 14.675.

Hill was selected represent the U.S. at the 2008 Pacific Rim Gymnastics Championships in San Jose, California, from March 28–30; three weeks after her grandmother's death. Initially sceptical to travel as she was still mourning the death of her grandmother, Darlene decided to compete at the event. She competed on both vault and floor in the team competition and advanced to the final of the latter. Hill won the floor final with a score of 15.425; placing ahead of future Olympic Champion Nastia Liukin. Two months later, in May, Hill competed at the Friendship International Exchange Competition at the Karolyi Ranch in Huntsville, Texas. She took home the bronze medal in the floor competition. However, she didn't compete in the all-around. In June, Hill competed at the VISA U.S. National Championships in Boston. After a combined two-day score of 85.600, she finished twentieth in the all-around; despite not competing all four events. She earned one of the final qualification berths to the 2008 U.S. Olympic Trials in Philadelphia. After one day of competition, Hill stood in nineteenth place in the all-around. The final day of competition, June 22, saw Hill place sixteenth in the all-around and eighth on floor. Hill was not named to the 2008 U.S. Olympic team nor was she named to the 2008-09 U.S. National team.

=== 2009: Forfeit of NCAA eligibility and retirement ===
In 2008, Hill signed with a paid sponsor, Team Gattaca, and thus, forfeited NCAA eligibility. At this time, she was searching for a specialist that could perform surgery on her on-going shoulder injuries that she was suffering during the 2008 season; as well as a sprained left ankle and hyper-extended left knee. It was Hill's goal to return to elite gymnastics for the 2009 season and beyond but she was forced into retirement because of her injuries.

== Personal life ==
Hill maintained public schooling despite her rigorous training schedule and graduated from Lenape High School in 2007.
