= Kelli Hill =

American retired gymnast and coach

- Born: c. 1960; Silver Spring, Maryland, U.S.
- Education: University of Maryland, College Park

Gymnastics career
- College team: University of Maryland, College Park
- Occupation: Gymnastics coach
- Years active: 1981–present
- Known for: Gymnastics coach for Dominique Dawes, Elise Ray, and Courtney Kupets
- Spouse: Rick Hill
- Children: 2

Kelli Hill (born c. 1960) is an American artistic gymnastics coach best known for coaching Olympians Dominique Dawes, Elise Ray, and Courtney Kupets, and Olympic reserves Corrie Lothrop and Kayla DiCello. She was the head coach of the United States women's national artistic gymnastics team for the 2000 and 2004 Olympic games and the 1994, 1996, 1999, 2000, and 2003 World Artistic Gymnastics Championships. From 1989 until 2011, Hill coached at least one member of the U.S. women's national artistic gymnastics team, excluding 2006. Hill also coached at least one gymnast or alternate on every Olympic team from 1992 through 2008. She is the owner of Hill's Gymnastics Training Center (Hill's Angels) in Gaithersburg, Maryland, and was inducted into the USA Gymnastics Hall of Fame in 2005.

== Early life and education ==
Hill was born in Silver Spring, Maryland and attended Montgomery Blair High School. She did gymnastics as a child and a teen, however she has described herself as a "low level" gymnast who was "not good at it."

She attended the University of Maryland, College Park, where she walked on to the gymnastics team. She intended to major in physical education, with the goal of coaching gymnastics. However, she dropped out months before graduation due to the requirement that she spend eight weeks as a student-teacher.

== Career ==
In 1981, at age 21, Hill bought a gym in Wheaton, Maryland. She moved the gym to Gaithersburg, Maryland in 1991. Her mother ran the gym's office while she coached. Because she had no formal training in coaching gymnastics, she learned how to coach by trial and error.

Hill was Dominique Dawes' only coach for the duration of her gymnastics career. In 1982, at age 6, Dawes joined Hill's Angels, one year after it was founded. Recognizing her natural abilities immediately, Kelli encouraged her to come to the gym as often as possible. By age 10, Dawes was competing as an elite gymnast. When the gym moved to its new location in 1991, Dominique moved into Kelli's home in order to be closer to the gym. Hill coached Dawes to three consecutive Olympic games: Barcelona in 1992, in Atlanta in 1996, and in Sydney in 2000. Dawes later attended the University of Maryland and continued to see her Hill on a regular basis. Both Hill and Dawes described their relationship as close, and Dawes once said "I wouldn't be where I am without her support and guidance...I didn't get here on my own. In my 18 years in the sport, she did a very good job protecting me from everything that was going on outside of gymnastics. She made me focus on the things I had control of and everything else was just put aside in a stack...everything from how the judges felt about me to the temperature of the gym. She was very big on instilling that lesson." Hill described their relationship as "very, very close" and "more like family than anything else." In 2020, Dawes announced that she was opening her own gym approximately 12 miles away from Hill's Gymnastics, claiming that she wanted to change the culture of gymnastics. At that time, Dawes said that she no longer spoke to Hill. Hill responded to Dawes' comments, saying that she had reached out to Dawes many times in the past two years and that Dawes had not responded. Hill also said she would be willing to help Dawes with opening her gymnastics academy.

Courtney Kupets began gymnastics at Hill's gym in 1989. In 1991, Hill was named Coach of the Year by USA Gymnastics and the U.S. Elite Coaches Association. In 1993, Hill was again named Coach of the Year by USA Gymnastics and the U.S. Elite Coaches Association.

At the 1993 World Championships, Dawes was in first place in the all-around competition, but slipped on her final vault, bursting into tears. A famous moment in gymnastics, Hill encouraged her to be proud of her performance, telling her: "It's okay, you gave it a good shot. When did you ever think you would be in that position? You have to be happy with yourself. Come on. Be happy. Stand up and wave." Dawes was given a standing ovation from the crowd for doing so.

In 1996, the U.S. Elite Coaches Association named Hill the organization's Coach of the Year for the third time. In 1998, Hill coached Elise Ray to the Goodwill Games, where she earned a silver medal. Both Ray and Dawes competed on the 1999 U.S. National Team for the World Artistic Gymnastics Championship.

In 2000, Hill coached both Dawes and Ray as they competed for the Olympic team and won a team bronze medal. Originally, China won the bronze medal for the team all-around competition. But in 2010, the Chinese gymnasts were stripped of their medals following an investigation which revealed that the Chinese team had falsified documents to allow the underage Dong Fangxiao to compete.

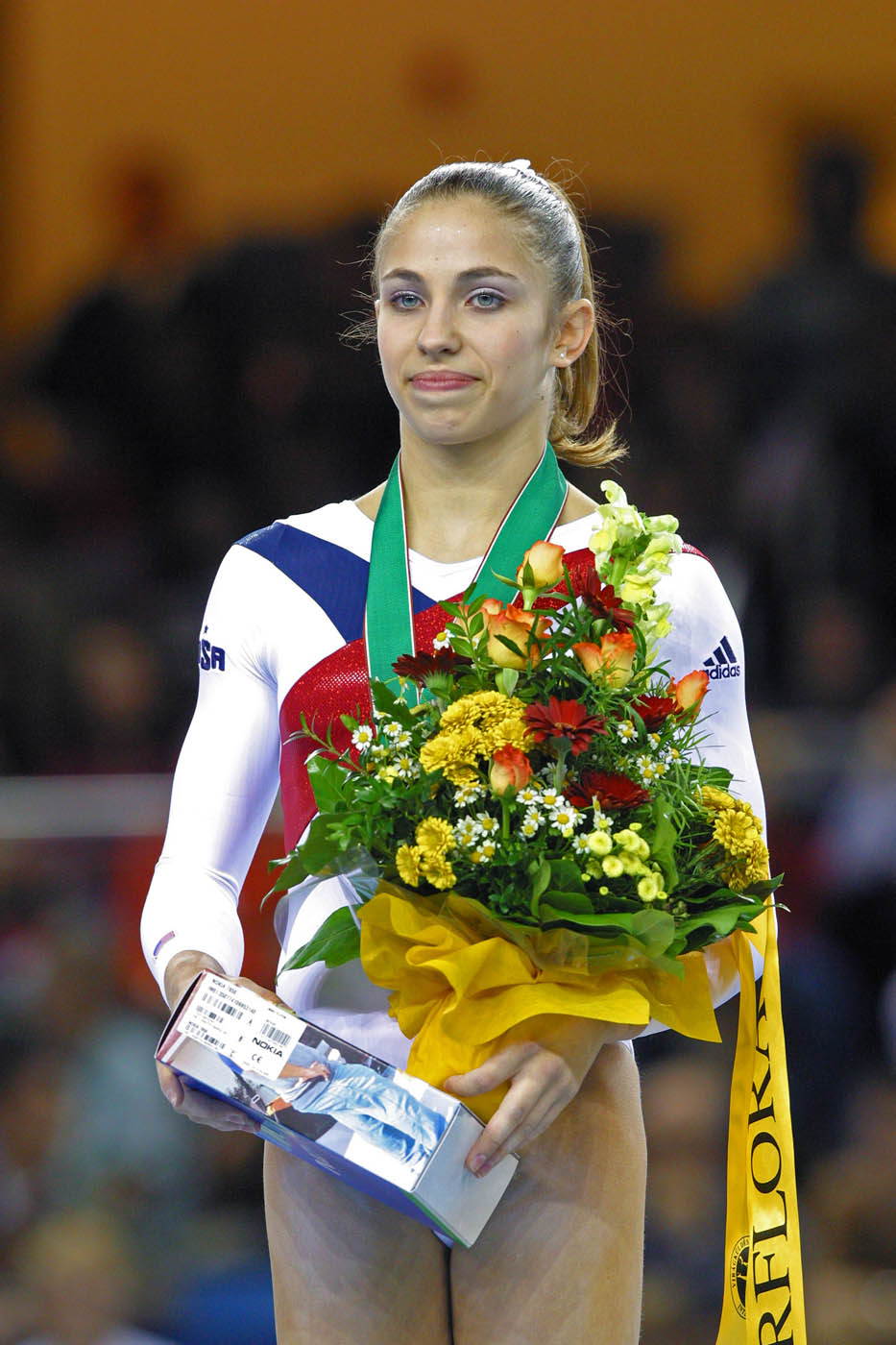
Kupets at the 2002 World Artistic Gymnastics Championships

In 2002, Kupets won the World Artistic Gymnastics Championships. In 2003, Kupets won the U.S. Classic while coached by Hill, becoming the national champion. Hill also coached Corey Hartung, who was a member of the 2003 U.S. National Team. In July, Hill was named the head coach of the women's national team for the 2003 World Artistic Gymnastics Championships. The team went on to win the gold medal at the World Championships. Kupets made the team and performed well in the qualification round, but severely injured her Achilles tendon during a practice session and had to return to Maryland for surgery. Following the 2003 season, Hill was named Coach of the Year by USA Gymnastics for the third time and by U.S. Elite Coaches Association for the fifth time.

In 2004, Kupets scored highest in the Olympic trials and traveled to Athens, where she won bronze on uneven bars and contributed scores on bars and floor to the team's 2nd-place finish. Hill's gymnast Corrie Lothrop was an alternate on the 2008 Olympic team, but did not compete.

Kayla DiCello joined Hill's Gymnastics in 2006, when she was two years old. In 2012, Hill was elected to serve a term on the USA Gymnastics Board of Directors, representing women's gymnastics. In 2020, DiCello was an Olympic alternate at the 2020 Summer Olympics in Tokyo. Following the 2020 Olympics, DiCello attended the University of Florida, competing on their women's gymnastics team, and Hill retired. Following her 2023 college season, DiCello decided she wanted to try to make the 2024 Olympic team. She called Hill and asked her if she would come out of retirement to coach her, and Hill said "yes." One week later, DiCello was back in Maryland training for the 2024 Olympic trials. At the trials, DiCello was injured and was forced to withdraw.

=== Elite Gymnasts ===
Gymnast	Time Coached	Achievements under Hill
Dominique Dawes	1982–2000	Olympic Gold Medalist (1996); Olympic Bronze Medalist (1992, 1996, 2000); World Artistic Gymnastics Silver Medalist (1993 x2, 1994, 1996); USA Gymnastics National Championships all-around senior (1994); U.S. Classic Champion (1993)
Elise Ray	–2001	Olympic Bronze Medalist (2000); Goodwill Games Silver Medalist (1998); U.S. National Team for the World Artistic Gymnastics Championship (1999)
Courtney Kupets	1989–2004	Olympic Silver Medalist (2004); Olympic Bronze Medalist (2004); World Artistic Gymnastics Gold Medalist (2002, 2003); USA Gymnastics National Championships all-around senior (2003, 2004); U.S. Classic Champion (2003)
Corey Hartung		U.S. National Team Member (2003); Maryland and Eastern Region all-around champion (2005)
Corrie Lothrop	2005–2009	Olympic alternate (2008); Pan American Gymnastics Championships Gold Medalist (2008); Pan American Gymnastics Championships Silver Medalist (2008 x3)
Kayla DiCello	2006–present	Olympic alternate (2020); World Artistic Gymnastics Gold Medalist (2023); World Artistic Gymnastics Bronze Medalist (2021); Pan American Games Gold Medalist (2023 x2); Pan American Games Silver Medalist (2023); Pan American Gymnastics Championships Gold Medalist (2022); Pan American Gymnastics Championships Silver Medalist (2022); USA Gymnastics National Championships 3rd all-around senior (2024)

== Personal life ==
Hill has two adult children, Ryan and Jason, and lives in Gaithersburg, Maryland. Jason Hill works at Hill's Gymnastics.

== Accolades ==
Hill was named as the USA Gymnastics coach of the year in 1991, 1993, 2000 and 2003, and the U.S. Elite Coaches Association coach of the year in 1991, 1993, 1996, 2000 and 2003. She was inducted into the USA Gymnastics Hall of Fame in 2005.
