= Andrew East =

American football player (born 1991)

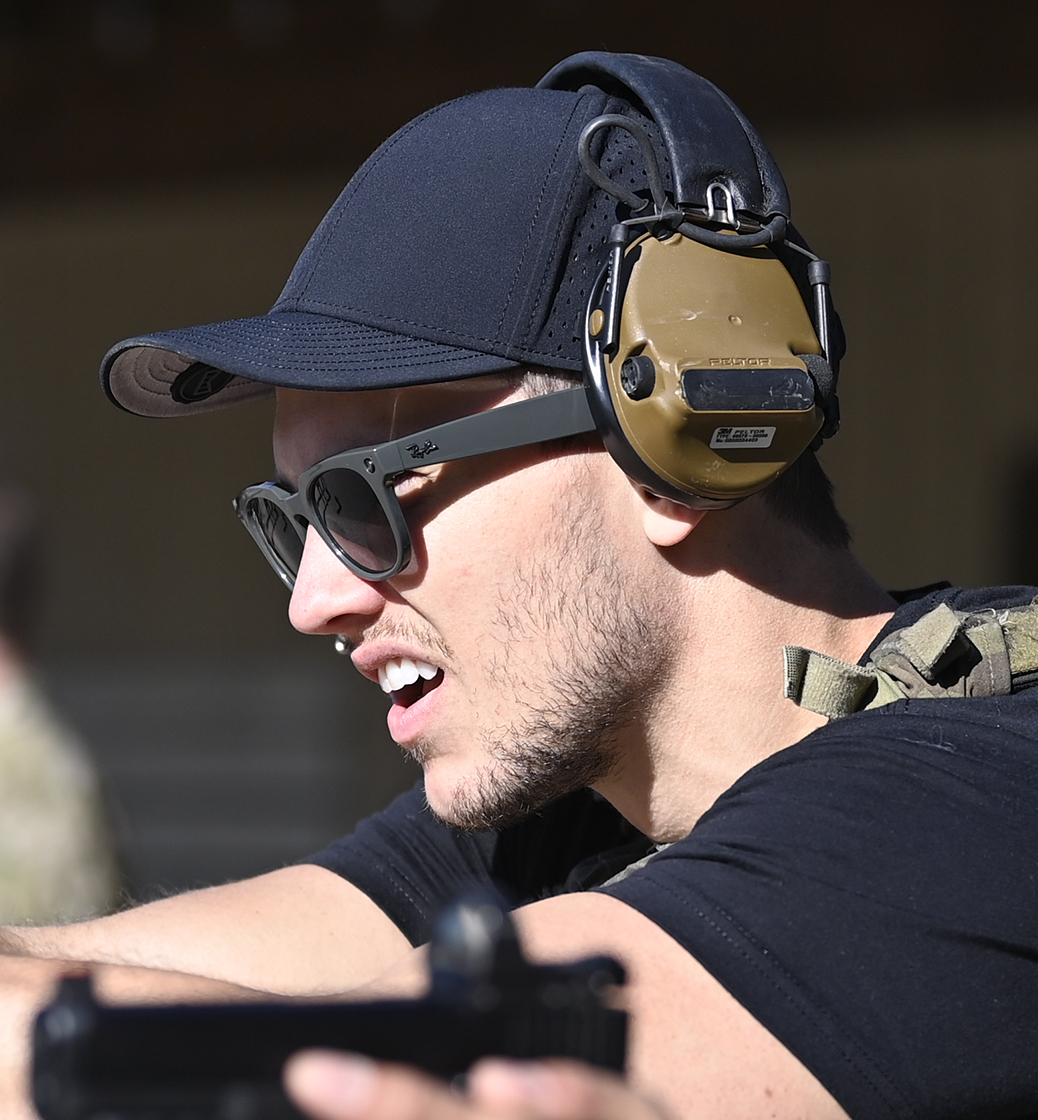
- East at John F. Kennedy Special Warfare Center and School in 2021

No. 55, 48
- Position: Long snapper

Personal information
- Born: September 17, 1991 (age 35); Indianapolis, Indiana, U.S.
- Listed height: 6 ft 2 in (1.88 m)
- Listed weight: 220 lb (100 kg)

Career information
- High school: North Central (Indianapolis)
- College: Vanderbilt
- NFL draft: 2015: undrafted

Career history
- Kansas City Chiefs (2015)*; Seattle Seahawks (2016)*; Oakland Raiders (2016)*; Los Angeles Rams (2017)*; Oakland Raiders (2017–2018)*; Jacksonville Jaguars (2018)*; Memphis Express (2018)*; Washington Redskins (2018)
- * Offseason or practice squad member only

Career NFL statistics
- Games played: 3
- Stats at Pro Football Reference

Andrew Dean East (born September 17, 1991) is an American former professional football player who was a long snapper in the National Football League (NFL). He played college football for the Vanderbilt Commodores, and had multiple stints with various NFL teams, including the Washington Redskins.

== Early life ==
East was named a captain of the North Central High School football team in Indianapolis, Indiana. He was a three-year starter on defense and special teams for the 5A division school in the Indianapolis area.

When East was a sophomore and junior, he started at the linebacker position, posting 110 tackles as a junior. He was named the All-Around-Area linebacker while starting as a long-snapper.

As a senior, East contributed 64 tackles and seven quarterback sacks as a first-year starter. He also received the Indiana Academic All-State honors award.

== Professional career ==
=== Kansas City Chiefs ===
East signed with the Kansas City Chiefs as an undrafted free agent on May 11, 2015. He was released by the Chiefs on August 30, 2015.

=== Seattle Seahawks ===
East signed a reserve/future contract with the Seattle Seahawks on January 4, 2016. He was waived on March 24, 2016.

=== Oakland Raiders ===
East was signed by the Oakland Raiders on April 5, 2016. He was waived by the team on August 29, 2016.

=== Los Angeles Rams ===
On March 13, 2017, East signed with the Los Angeles Rams. On May 3, 2017, he was waived by the Rams.

=== Oakland Raiders (second stint) ===
On July 28, 2017, East was signed by the Raiders. He was waived on September 2, 2017. He signed a reserve/future contract with the Raiders on January 19, 2018. He was waived by the Raiders on April 9, 2018.

=== Jacksonville Jaguars ===
On June 14, 2018, East signed with the Jacksonville Jaguars. He was waived on July 31, 2018.

=== Memphis Express ===
On November 9, 2018, East was allocated to the Memphis Express.

=== Washington Redskins ===
On December 15, 2018, East was signed by the Washington Redskins after long snapper Nick Sundberg was placed on injured reserve due to a back injury. He was waived on August 2, 2019.

He announced his retirement in a video on his family's YouTube channel on February 25, 2022.

== Personal life ==
East is married to Olympic gymnast and gold medalist Shawn Johnson. East and Johnson were engaged on July 24, 2015, at Wrigley Field during a Chicago Cubs game, and were married on April 16, 2016, in Franklin, Tennessee. The couple live in Nashville, Tennessee. They have three children.

In 2022, East and his wife joined the ownership group of Angel City FC of the National Women's Soccer League.

== Television appearances ==
East competed on season 13 and 14 of American Ninja Warrior.

In 2025, East appeared on season 4 of Special Forces: World's Toughest Test, where he placed fifth.
