= Shawn Johnson East =

American artistic gymnast (born 1992)

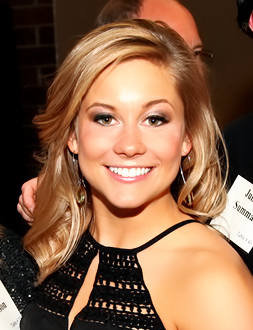
- Johnson in 2012

Personal information
- Nickname: America's Sweetheart
- Born: January 19, 1992 (age 34) Des Moines, Iowa, U.S.
- Height: 4 ft 11 in (150 cm)
- Spouse: Andrew East (m. 2016)

Gymnastics career
- Discipline: Women's artistic gymnastics
- Country represented: United States; (2004–2008, 2011–2012)
- Club: Chow's Gymnastics and Dance Institute
- Head coach: Liang Chow
- Assistant coach: Liwen Zhuang
- Retired: June 3, 2012
Medal record
Women's artistic gymnastics
Representing the United States
Event	1st	2nd	3rd
Olympic Games	1	3	0
World Championships	3	0	0
Pan American Games	5	2	0
American Cup	1	1	0
Total	10	6	0
Olympic Games
Gold medal – first place	2008 Beijing	Balance beam
Silver medal – second place	2008 Beijing	Team
Silver medal – second place	2008 Beijing	All-around
Silver medal – second place	2008 Beijing	Floor exercise
World Championships
Gold medal – first place	2007 Stuttgart	Team
Gold medal – first place	2007 Stuttgart	All-around
Gold medal – first place	2007 Stuttgart	Floor exercise
Pan American Games
Gold medal – first place	2007 Rio de Janeiro	Team
Gold medal – first place	2007 Rio de Janeiro	All-around
Gold medal – first place	2007 Rio de Janeiro	Uneven bars
Gold medal – first place	2007 Rio de Janeiro	Balance beam
Gold medal – first place	2011 Guadalajara	Team
Silver medal – second place	2007 Rio de Janeiro	Floor exercise
Silver medal – second place	2011 Guadalajara	Uneven Bars
American Cup
Gold medal – first place	2007 Jacksonville	All-around
Silver medal – second place	2008 New York	All-around
- Children: 3
- Awards: Longines Prize for Elegance (2007) ESPY for Best US Female Olympian (2009) James E. Sullivan Award (2008)
- Website: ShawnJohnson.com

Shawn Johnson East (born Shawn Machel Johnson; January 19, 1992) is an American former artistic gymnast. She is the 2008 Olympic balance beam gold medalist and team, all-around and floor exercise silver medalist. Johnson is also the 2007 all-around World Champion, and a five-time Pan American Games gold medalist, winning the team titles in 2007 and 2011, as well as titles in the all-around, uneven bars, and balance beam in 2007.

Johnson became a member of the U.S. senior team in 2007. Her rookie season included winning the all-around at the American Cup, Pan American Games, U.S. National Championships, and World Championships. Johnson is also the 2007 individual all-around World Champion, 2007 World Champion on floor exercise, and a member of the 2007 gold medal-winning U.S. gymnastics team. As well as being the 2007 U.S. Champion on balance beam and floor exercise, the 2008 U.S. Champion on floor exercise and silver medalist on balance beam, Johnson is a three-time U.S. all-around Champion, winning once as a junior and twice as a senior.

In May 2009, Johnson was the winner of season eight of Dancing with the Stars, and in November 2012 she earned second place on the all-star edition.

Johnson announced her retirement from gymnastics on June 3, 2012.

== Early and personal life ==
Johnson was born in Des Moines, Iowa on January 19, 1992, the daughter of Doug and Teri Johnson. Her parents enrolled her in a gymnastics class at age 3, after they noticed her climbing cabinets and jumping off tables. At age 6, Johnson was one of Liang Chow's first students when he opened a gymnastics school in West Des Moines, and he would go on to coach Johnson for nearly two decades as a competitive gymnast. "Chow is like a father to me, we've been with each other for so long," Johnson said in 2012.

Johnson attended Valley High School. She was on the honor roll and liked to attend football games and dances. Through 2008, Johnson maintained a more balanced lifestyle than typical of elite female gymnasts. She limited her gymnastics training to 25 hours per week, as opposed to the more typical 40 hours.

Johnson left public school in the spring of 2009. She and her mother relocated to Los Angeles, California, before appearing on Dancing with the Stars. In 2010, she finished high school with a private tutor. She enrolled at Vanderbilt University in 2013, but withdrew before classes began.

Johnson is married to Andrew East, a professional football long snapper who played for the Vanderbilt Commodores in college and the Washington Commanders (then the Redskins) in 2018. They were engaged on July 24, 2015, at Wrigley Field during a Chicago Cubs game and were married on April 16, 2016, in Franklin, Tennessee. They live in Nashville, Tennessee.

In November 2015, she revealed that she had suffered from an eating disorder in 2008 in the lead-up to the 2008 Olympics. She admitted she would eat approximately 700 calories per day.

In October 2017, Johnson revealed through a YouTube video that she had been pregnant, but suffered a miscarriage. In April 2019, Johnson and her husband announced they were expecting their first child. Their daughter was born on October 29, 2019. In January 2021, Johnson and her husband announced that they were expecting their second child. Their son was born on July 19, 2021. In July 2023, Johnson and her husband announced on their YouTube channel that they were expecting their third child. Their second son was born December 12, 2023.

In February 2022, Johnson and her husband joined the ownership group of Angel City FC of the National Women's Soccer League.

== Gymnastics career ==
=== Junior career ===
==== Pre-elite ====
When she was 12, Johnson competed in the Developmental Program- (U.S. Level 10 National Championships, finishing fourth in the all-around, first on beam, and second on floor.

As a youngster, Johnson was not invited to USA Gymnastics' national team training camps, and her coach, Liang Chow, had no interactions with the national staff. In 2005, Chow sent the National Team Coordinator, Marta Karolyi, a video of Johnson with the comment "I believe this kid will help the U.S. team." Karolyi felt the action was audacious, commenting, "Wow, this coach is pretty confident", but she soon invited Johnson to national team training camps.

==== Junior elite ====
Johnson qualified Junior International Elite on her first attempt. She attracted widespread attention at the 2005 U.S. Classic, where she placed third. At the 2005 U.S. National Championships, Johnson fell from the beam on the first day of competition and finished tenth all-around.

In 2006, Johnson added several new skills, including a Jaeger on bars, and two top-difficulty (G) skills, a full-in back-out dismount off beam and a double-twisting double back on floor. She won the 2006 U.S. Junior National All-Around Championship with a score higher than any of her senior elite competitors.

=== Senior career ===
==== 2007: pre-Worlds ====
Johnson became a senior in 2007 and continued to show new skills, including a double-twisting double layout dismount off the uneven bars. She competed at the American Cup, winning the all-around over teammate Natasha Kelley. Johnson also competed in the 2007 Pan American Games, winning four gold medals (team, all-around, beam and bars) and a silver on floor.

Johnson won the all-around at the 2007 Visa U.S. National Championships, beating Shayla Worley by more than three points.

==== 2007 World Championships ====
Johnson represented the U.S. at the 2007 World Artistic Gymnastics Championships along with Nastia Liukin, Shayla Worley, Alicia Sacramone, Ivana Hong, and Samantha Peszek.

In prelims (qualification), Johnson scored 16.250 on beam, 15.150 on floor, 15.175 on vault, and (with a fall on her dismount) 14.625 on bars. The U.S. finished first in prelims and Johnson qualified to the all-around, beam, and floor finals.

Johnson performed all four events in the team finals; the only U.S. athlete to do this. Johnson scored 15.375 on bars and floor, and 15.150 on vault. She fell on the beam on her handspring-handspring-layout series and scored 15.025. The team won gold with 184.400 points, 0.950 ahead of silver-medal China. It was the second U.S. team gold in the World Championships.

In the all-around finals, Johnson scored a 15.175 on vault, 15.375 on bars, 15.900 on beam and 15.425 on floor. Her 61.875 total made her the fourth American woman to win the all-around gold medal.

During event finals, Johnson first competed on the balance beam, where she fell on her standing full and on her switch side leap, scoring a 14.475 and finishing last. In floor exercise, she went out-of-bounds on her first tumbling pass, but won the gold with a 15.250, just eclipsing teammate Sacramone.

==== 2008: pre-Olympics ====
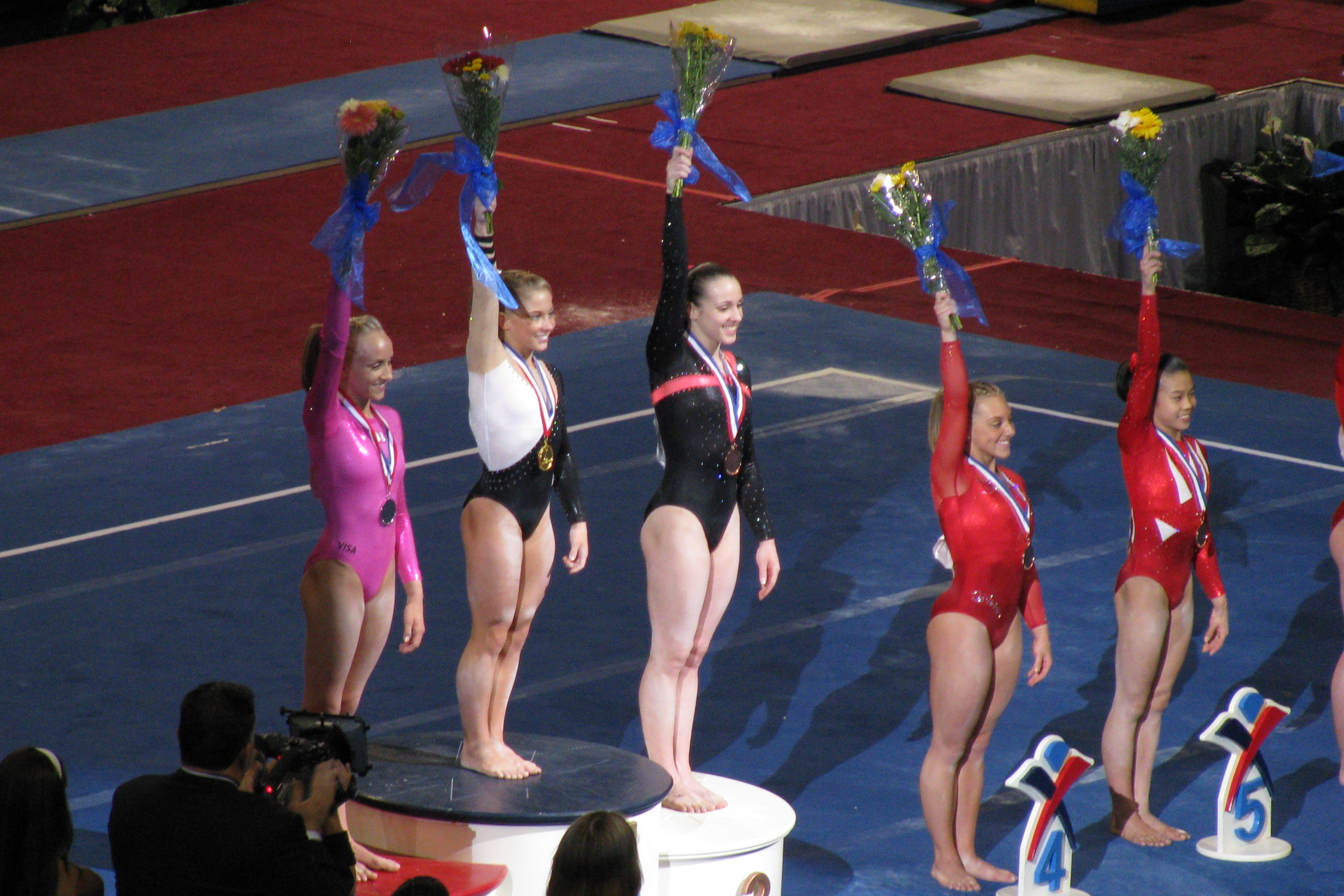
Johnson winning 2008 US National title

Johnson competed again in the American Cup on March 1, 2008, in Madison Square Garden. She fell on her Amanar vault, scoring a 15.175. On the other apparatus, she scored 15.625 on bars, 16.325 on beam, and 15.975 on floor. Although Johnson scored first on the vault, balance beam, and floor, she finished second in the all-around. Nastia Liukin won gold with an uneven bars score nearly a point higher than Johnson.

One week later, Johnson represented the U.S. in Jesolo, Italy against Italy, Spain, and Poland, along with Jana Bieger, Olivia Courtney, Chelsea Davis, Bridget Sloan, and Samantha Peszek. The U.S. won the junior and senior all-around team titles. Johnson won the all-around with a 61.7, earning the highest scores on vault (15.2), beam (16.2), and floor (15.0). Johnson finished first on floor, despite falling, on her double-double mount.

On June 7, 2008, Johnson won the 2008 U.S. Visa Championships. Johnson scored 127.5, winning the all-around title by one point ahead of Liukin. Johnson also won the floor exercise.

Two weeks later, Johnson won the all-around at the Olympic Trials in Philadelphia, Pennsylvania, again finishing ahead of Liukin. Because of their top placements, Johnson and Liukin were named to the 2008 U.S. Olympic gymnastics team immediately after the Trials. The other four 2008 team members earned their spots after two additional selection camps.

==== 2008 Summer Olympics ====
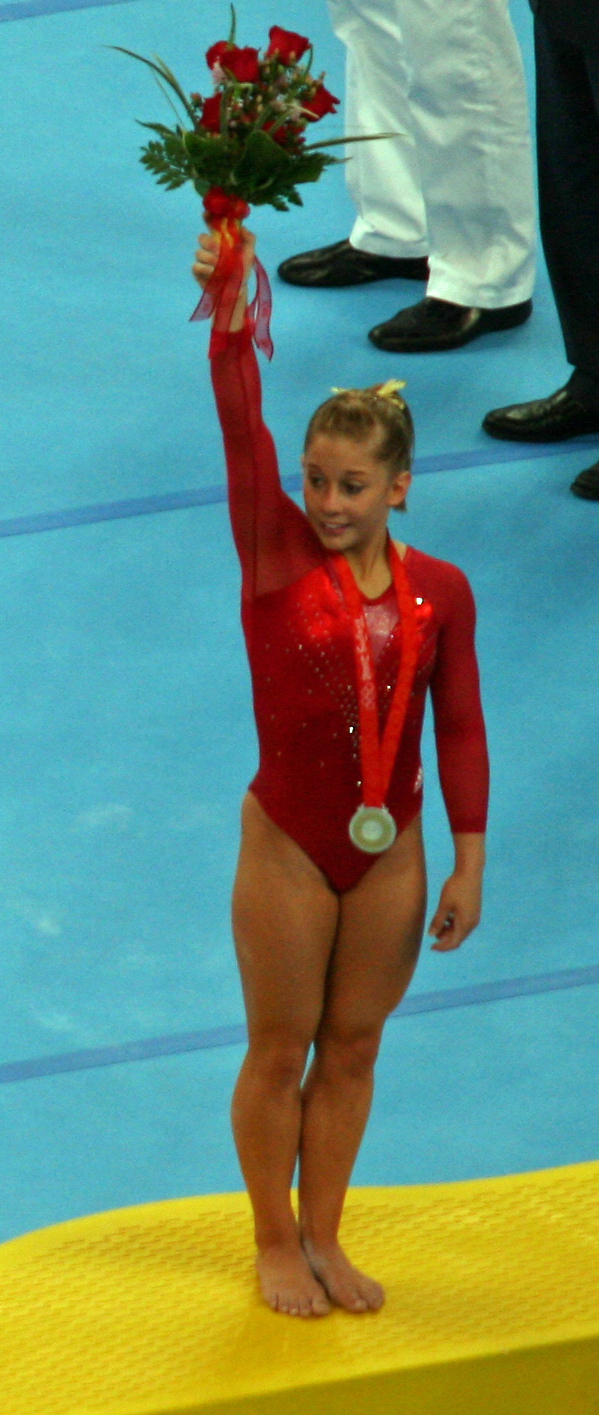
Johnson winning silver at the 2008 Summer Olympics all-around

At the 2008 Summer Olympics, Johnson competed in all four events during the team competition, in which the United States won the silver medal. Johnson also won the silver medal in the individual all-around competition, receiving a score of 62.725. Johnson's teammate and roommate at the Olympic Village, Nastia Liukin, won the gold medal, receiving a score of 63.325. With Liukin taking gold and Johnson silver, this competition was the first time that the United States Women's Gymnastics team took both the gold and silver medals in the individual all-around competition; this competition also marks the fourth time a country won both gold and silver medals in the individual all-around competition.

She won the silver medal in floor exercise, with teammate Liukin taking bronze. She won a gold medal on the balance beam apparatus becoming the second American to win gold on balance beam after Shannon Miller who won in 1996. Like the individual all-around, she and Liukin took the top two medals in this event. She qualified as the second reserve to the uneven bars final, but did not compete.

==== Comeback ====
In January 2010, Johnson tore her left ACL and MCL while skiing. She had reconstructive knee surgery the following week.

In May 2010, Johnson announced her return to gymnastics training with a goal of making the 2012 U.S. Olympic team.

In August 2010, Johnson communicated that her knee recovered to allow full training and that she had learned a new difficult skill.

In September 2010, Johnson released videos showing the following skills (training status):

- Vault
  - 2.5 twisting Yurchenko "Amanar" (into pit)
  - Double twisting Yurchenko (into pit)
- Uneven bars
  - double twisting double layout dismount (into pit)
  - toe-on full pirouette, connected to Geinger salto
- Beam
  - back handspring, back handspring, full twisting layout (floor line)
  - standing full twisting back salto (floor line)
  - back handspring, back handspring, layout (low beam)
  - switch leap, layout step-out, back pike
  - back tuck
- Floor exercise
  - full twisting double layout (spotted onto pit mat, also unassisted on tumbletrack)
  - double layout (unassisted onto pit mat and on tumbletrack)
  - whip, double twisting back layout (tumbletrack)
  - double pike
  - double layout (unassisted on the spring floor)

In November 2010, Johnson entered her first post-Olympics National Team Training Camp. Although, she had expected to return to the "ranch" later in her comeback, based on the demonstrated progress in her video, Marta Karolyi requested that she appear sooner. Johnson mentioned that her reconstructed knee still hindered high training volume.

In February 2011, Johnson became an official member of the USA Senior National team once again which allowed her to compete in international competitions. She stated that she wished to return to competition later in 2011.

In September 2011 Johnson was named a non-traveling alternate to the 2011 USA Women's World Championships Team.

In October 2011 Johnson was named to the 2011 Pan American Games Team. She won a gold medal in the team competition and also a silver medal for her performance on the uneven bars.

=== Retirement ===
On June 3, 2012, Johnson ended her comeback for the 2012 Olympic team and retired from competitive gymnastics because of continuing problems with her left knee.

=== Honors ===
Johnson was one of two female athletes to appear on AOL's 100 most searched females on the Internet for 2009, ranked 27th.

A scientific poll commissioned by Forbes magazine concluded Johnson was "America's Most-Liked Sports Figure" in 2009.

Johnson was also on the top of most appealing athletes on E-score Celebrity metric in 2010, and she was ranked seventh of America's Favorite Female Sports Stars on Harris Interactive in 2010.

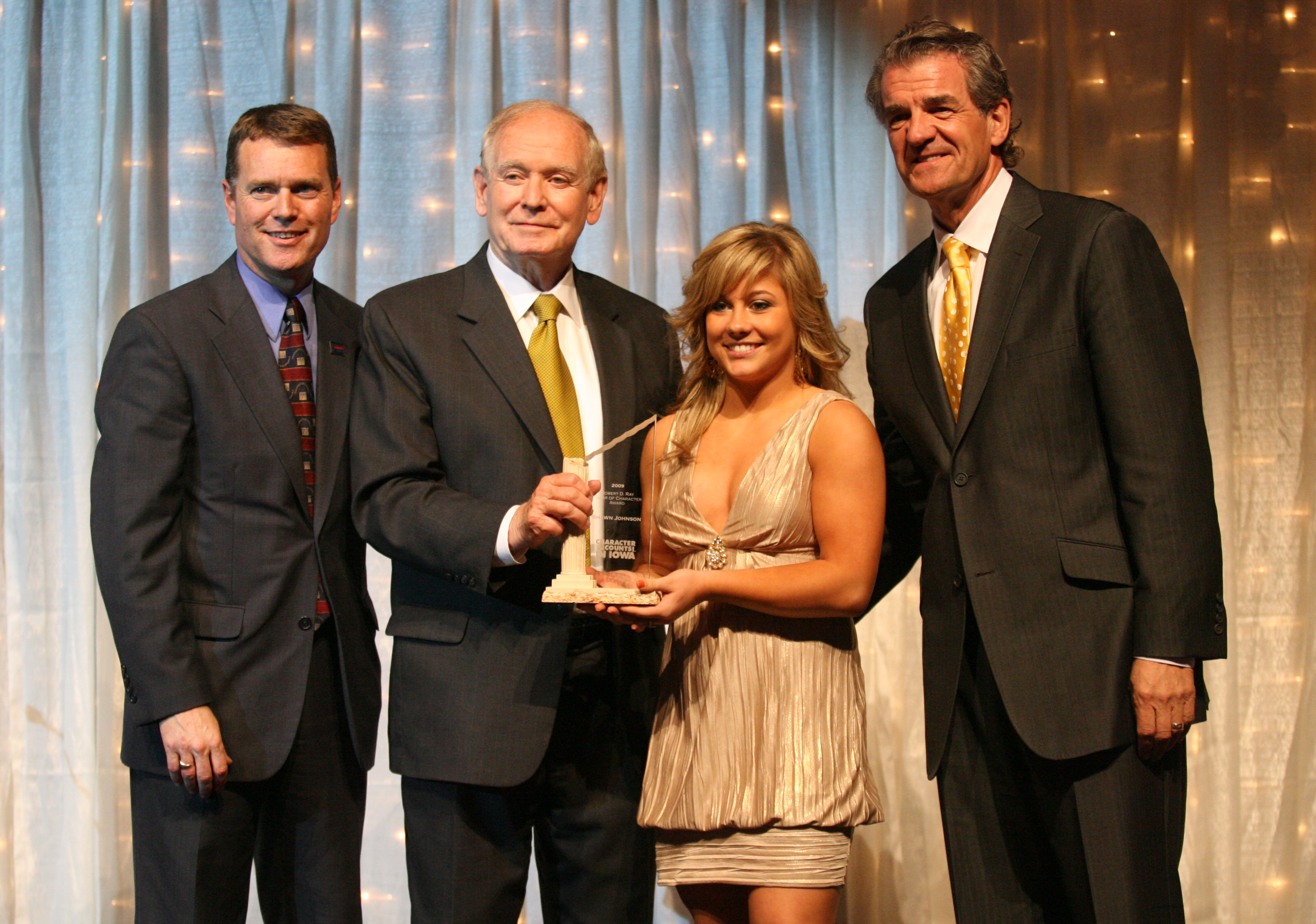
Johnson receiving the Robert D. Ray Pillar of Character Award in 2009

ESPN announced Johnson's nomination for the 2009 "Best Female U.S. Olympian" ESPY. Johnson won the ESPY for "Best Female U.S. Olympian" and the "Athlete – Female" Teen Choice Award, the latter for the second consecutive year.

On April 15, 2009, Johnson was awarded the prestigious AAU James E. Sullivan Award. The annual award honors the USA athlete who best represents "the qualities of leadership, character, sportsmanship, and the ideals of amateurism." She became the first female gymnast to win this award and the third gymnast after Kurt Thomas and Paul Hamm.

Johnson ranked fifth in the Associated Press' 2008 Female Athlete of the Year voting.

Johnson was the winner of the 2008 Teen Choice Award for Best Female Athlete, although she was not able to accept the honor in person because of Olympic training commitments. She was the first gymnast to be nominated for the award.

A life-sized bronze sculpture of Johnson honors the gymnast at the Iowa Hall of Pride in Des Moines.

On September 7, 2007, Johnson received the "Longines Prize for Elegance" in Stuttgart, Germany along with Japan's Hiroyuki Tomita. The prize is given in recognition of athletes who demonstrate remarkable elegance in the course of an international competition at world level; the decision was unanimous. In addition to the trophy, designed by the Swiss artist Piero Travaglini, recipients also receive a wristwatch from the Longines Evidenza collection and a check for $5,000.

Following Johnson's World Championship performances in 2007, Governor Chet Culver of Iowa proclaimed October 17 "Shawn Johnson Day" in the state.

On August 15, 2013, Johnson, along with her 2007 Worlds team teammates, was inducted into the USA Gymnastics Hall of Fame.

She was inducted into the International Gymnastics Hall of Fame in 2019.

== In popular culture ==
=== Dancing with the Stars ===
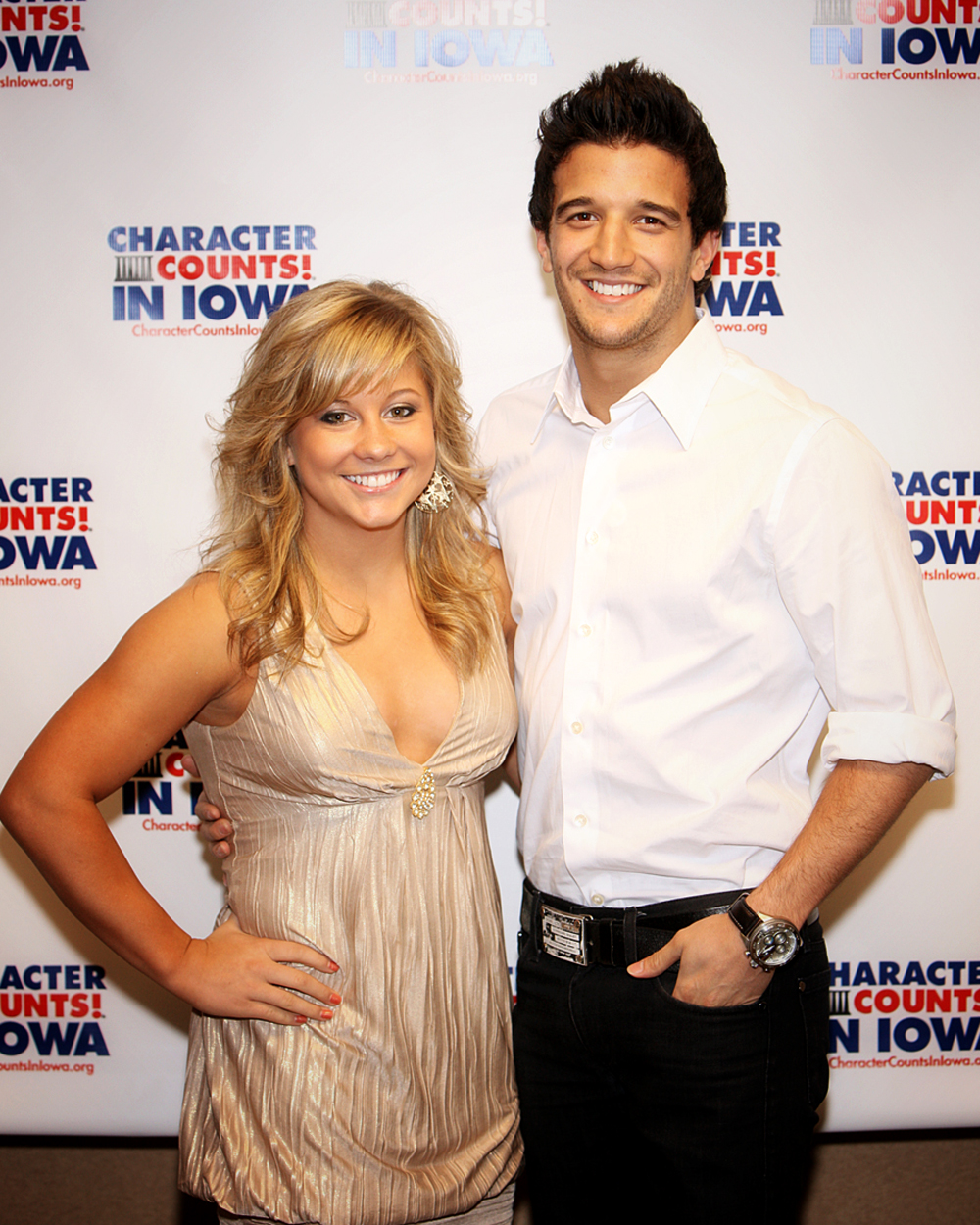
Shawn Johnson and her DWTS partner Mark Ballas

In February 2009, Johnson became a celebrity competitor on ABC's Dancing with the Stars season eight, partnered with season six winner, professional dancer Mark Ballas. In the finale, the tightest in the show's history, Johnson beat Gilles Marini by less than 1%. She was the youngest champion in the show's history at that time.

In April 2009, she appeared in the music video "Do You Love Me" by Ballas Hough Band wearing one of her Dancing with the Stars costumes. Later, she reunited with one of the show hosts, Tom Bergeron, at the 82nd Scripps National Spelling Bee to discuss her victory.

On September 24, 2012, Johnson again became a contestant on Dancing with the Stars, on the all-star edition (season 15). Her partner this time was three-time champion Derek Hough. The team of Johnson and Hough came in 2nd place to Melissa Rycroft and Tony Dovolani, which aired on November 27, 2012. During the finale, Len Goodman called Johnson "The No-Stress Express", stating that every piece that was thrown at her, she pulled off with little stress, and turned out a clean performance. In week three, judge Bruno Tonioli called Johnson and her partner "The Incredibles" after their performance on stage, stating that it was "the best routine I have seen in 15 seasons in America [of Dancing with the Stars] and 9 in the UK [of Strictly Come Dancing]."

==== Dancing with the Stars performances ====
In season eight, Johnson and her partner Mark Ballas were crowned the champions.

Week #	Dance/song	Judges' score			Result
Week #	Dance/song	Inaba	Goodman	Tonioli	Result
1	Waltz/"It is You (I Have Loved)"	8	8	7	No elimination
2	Salsa/"Las Muchachas"	8	8	8	Safe
3	Foxtrot/"More Than This"	9	9	9	Safe
4	Lindy Hop/"Ready Teddy"	8	8	9	Safe
5	Viennese Waltz/"Ordinary Day"	9	8	9	Safe
6	Rumba/"Slow Dancing in a Burning Room"	8	9	9	Safe
7	Cha-cha-cha/"P.Y.T. (Pretty Young Thing)"	9	9	10	Safe
8	Samba/"Get Down on It"; Team Mambo/"Single Ladies (Put a Ring on It)"	10; 8	8; 8	9; 9	Safe
9 Quarter-finals	Quickstep / "Friend Like Me"; Paso Doble/"Gotta Get thru This"	9; 10	9; 9	9; 10	Safe
10; Semi-finals	Argentine Tango/"Asi Se Baila El Tango"; Jive/"Reet Petite"	10; 9	10; 8	10; 9	Safe
11; Finals	Paso Doble/"So What"; Freestyle/"Do Your Thing"; Cha-cha-cha/"P.Y.T. (Pretty Young Thing)"	9; 10; 10	9; 10; 10	10; 10; 10	Winner

Johnson returned for the All-Stars Season partnered with three-time champion Derek Hough. Johnson and Hough finished as the runners-up.

Week #	Dance/song	Judges' score			Result
Week #	Dance/song	Inaba	Goodman	Tonioli	Result
1	Foxtrot/"Good Time"	8	6.5	7.5	Safe
2	Jive/"The Nicest Kids in Town"	8.5	8	8.5	Safe
3	Quickstep/"Hey Pachuco"	9	8	9.5	Safe
4	Mambo/"Paro los Rumberos"	10	9.5	10/10*	Safe
5	Rumba/"My Heart Will Go On"; Group Freestyle Dance/"Call Me Maybe"	9; 9.5	8; 10	10; 10	No elimination
6	Cha-cha-cha/"She Thinks My Tractor's Sexy"	9.5	8.5	10	Safe
7	Tango & Paso Doble/"Livin' On A Prayer"; Swing Dance Marathon/"Do Your Thing"	10; Awarded	10; 8	10 points	Dance with Mark Ballas
8 Quarter-Finals	Viennese Waltz/"Angel" (Trio Challenge) Samba/"Jungle Jazz"	10; 10	9.5; 7	10; 9	Safe
9 Semi-finals	"Knight Rider" Bhangra/"Mundian to Bach Ke"; Argentine Tango/"Bad"	10; 9	10; 10	10; 10	Safe
10; Finals	Quickstep/"Hey Pachuco"; Freestyle/"Carnival de Paris"; Instant Cha-cha-cha/"Respect"	9; 10; 10	8.5; 10; 10	9.5; 10; 10	Runner-Up

- Guest judge Paula Abdul

=== Other television appearances ===
Johnson has appeared on many talk shows: The Today Show (3 times), CCTV (August 20, 2008), The Tonight Show with Jay Leno (August 24, 2008), the Late Show with David Letterman (August 25, 2008), The Oprah Winfrey Show (September 8, 2008), The Ellen DeGeneres Show (4 times), Live with Regis and Kelly (October 22, 2008), and Jimmy Kimmel Live! (May 20, 2009).

In September 2008, she made a cameo appearance on The Secret Life of the American Teenager season one episode "Just Say No". She made a second appearance in the series, in the season two episode "Just Say Me", which aired January 25, 2010.

Johnson was a celebrity participant in the 2009 Taco Bell All-Star Legends Celebrity Softball Game which aired on ESPN, July 13, 2009.

In June 2009, Johnson was featured in a satirical news video by The Onion in which it was reported that she had been euthanized after breaking a leg.

On August 13, 2009, she appeared on the celebrity edition of Who Wants to Be a Millionaire. She correctly answered a question about the lyrics to "Grandma Got Run Over by a Reindeer", winning $50,000 for her chosen charity, Blank Children's Hospital.

Johnson judged the 2010 Miss America pageant.

In September 2013, Johnson was a guest star on the revival of Whose Line Is It Anyway?

Johnson was a cast member for the 2015 season of Celebrity Apprentice. She was the sixth contestant fired from the show.

Season 2 of Adventure Capitalists, airing on CNBC in October 2017, featured Johnson as one of four investors looking to invest in aspiring entrepreneur-contestants' outdoor inventions.

Johnson competed on the special for the MTV reality series The Challenge, titled Champs vs. Stars. The special premiered November 21, 2017. Johnson was sent home in an elimination round by champion Tori Deal in the fourth episode, which aired on December 12, 2017.

In 2018 Johnson and her family were featured on Family Feud where they lost to fellow Olympic gymnast Laurie Hernandez's family.

In 2021, Johnson made a second appearance on Whose Line is it Anyway?

In 2025, Johnson competed in season 4 of the Fox reality show Special Forces: World's Toughest Test with her husband Andrew East. She passed the entire course and tied for first place with Gia Giudice.

=== Public appearances ===
Johnson led the Pledge of Allegiance on August 28, 2008, at the 2008 Democratic National Convention.

On July 27, 2009, Johnson led the singing of "Take Me Out to the Ballgame" during the seventh-inning stretch at Wrigley Field.

=== Gymnastic tours ===
From September to November 2008, Johnson was a marquee member of The Tour of Gymnastics Superstars. Recorded sections of the tour's second show were included in Frosted Pink with a Twist, which is a television special about women's cancers (Johnson has a grandmother who is a cancer survivor). The television special also featured singers Jesse McCartney, Kenny Loggins, Cyndi Lauper, and Carole King. Johnson also headlined the Progressive Skating and Gymnastics Spectacular in Rapid City, South Dakota, on December 23, 2008. The show aired nationally on NBC on January 18, 2009.

=== Books ===
In December 2008, Johnson unveiled a book, Shawn Johnson: Olympic Champion: Stories Behind the Smile (ISBN 978-1-934417-01-0), chronicling her life story through personal photographs and quotes.

In June 2012, Johnson released another book, Winning Balance: What I've Learned So Far about Love, Faith, and Living Your Dreams, about her experiences as an elite gymnast and post-Olympic life.

In June 2016, Johnson released a young adult novel, The Flip Side, about a young gymnast trying to balance her dream of obtaining an Olympic gold medal with her desire to be a "normal" teenager.

=== Advertisements ===
Midwest grocery chain Hy-Vee, headquartered in Johnson's hometown of West Des Moines, ran television ads before and during the Olympics featuring Johnson. After the Olympics, Johnson appeared in television ads and online campaigns for Ortega ("Ortega makes my taco pop") and McDonald's, as well as print and web advertisements for CoverGirl and Secret deodorant. Johnson also appeared on food packaging for McDonald's, Coca-Cola, Oscar Mayer Lunchables and Hy-Vee products. Reports by Johnson's agent, Sheryl Shade, that Johnson would grace the Wheaties cereal box, did not come to fruition. Her likeness did appear on a limited edition Cheerios box in January 2009. In 2011, Johnson signed a sponsorship deal with Nike. Other endorsements include:

- Longines watches (2007)
- Crest toothpaste (P&G)
- Sanofi-Aventis pharmaceuticals (2008)
- Oroweat baked goods (2008)
- Circuit City
- InterContinental Hotels Group
- Eukanuba
- Nestle
- Bounty paper towels (2012)
- Mentionables Lingerie Line (2020)

=== Other work ===
Johnson has served as a spokesperson for the pharmaceutical company Sanofi-Aventis, advocating awareness of women's cancers through the "What You Do Matters" campaign. Johnson has also partnered with Crest toothpaste to promote dental health, passing out toothpaste to low-income people.

=== Charity work ===
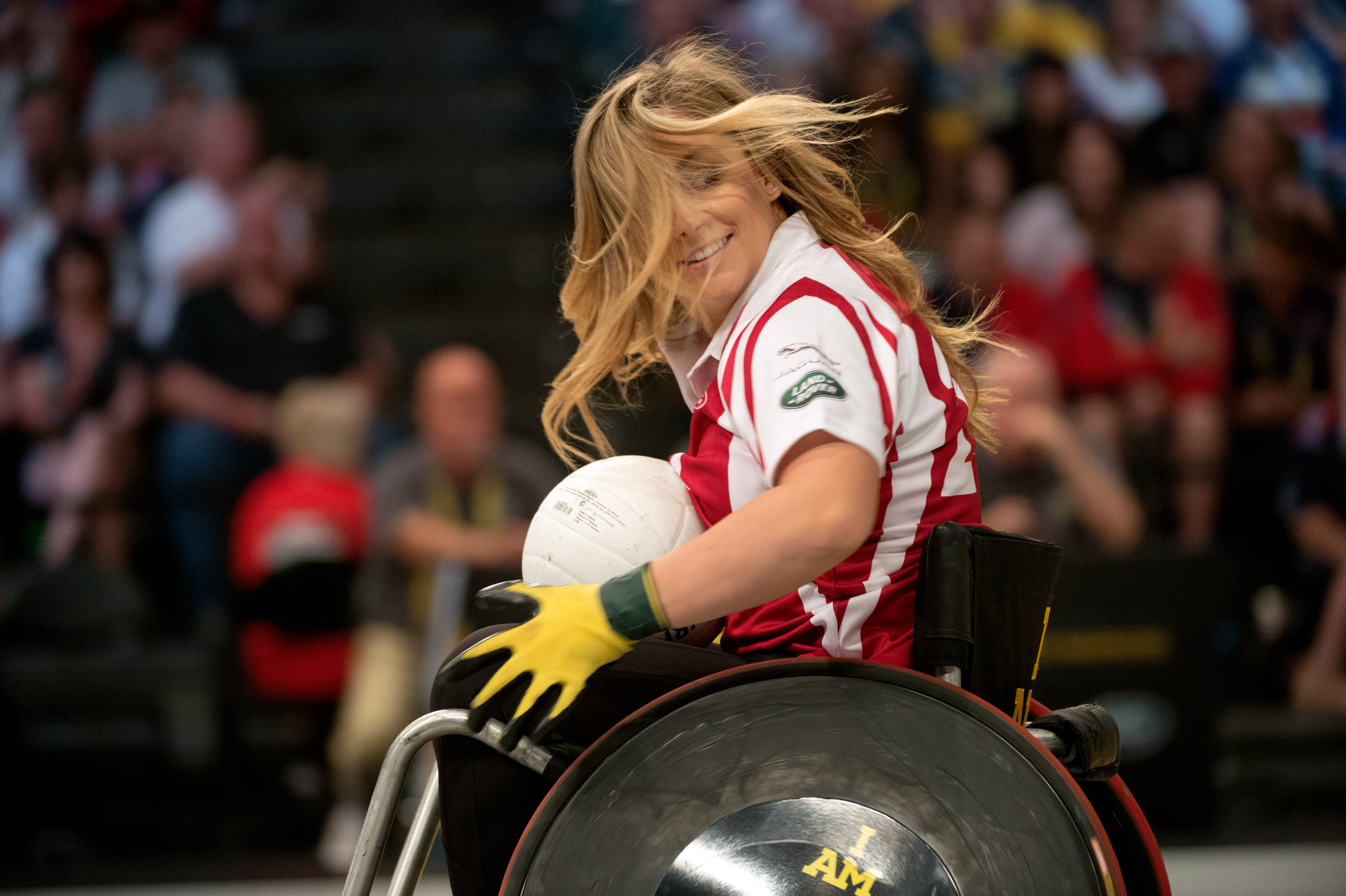
Johnson playing wheelchair rugby during an exhibition match with Invictus athletes and celebrities during the 2016 Invictus Games

Since becoming a professional athlete, Johnson has been involved with numerous charitable causes. In December 2008, she co-hosted a charity event with fellow Iowa native actor Ashton Kutcher to raise money to repair areas of her home state devastated by flooding. She also supports the "Exercise Your Character" program through speaking engagements.

=== Stalking incident ===
On March 25, 2009, a stalker was arrested after jumping a fence and sneaking onto the CBS lot. At the time, Johnson was competing in the 8th season of Dancing with the Stars. According to court documents filed in Los Angeles, 34-year-old Robert O'Ryan was arrested while in possession of guns, duct tape, zip ties, and love letters to Johnson, who was 17 at the time. O'Ryan left his home in Florida and traveled to California, believing that Johnson spoke to him through the television via ESP, stating that they would be together and have a child. The Johnson family filed a restraining order against O'Ryan. He was charged with felony stalking, burglary, and two misdemeanor counts of carrying a loaded firearm in a vehicle. He pleaded not guilty by reason of insanity, and was committed to Patton State Hospital for a maximum of five years.

== Competitive history ==
Competitive history of Shawn Johnson at the junior level
Year	Event	Team	AA	VT	UB	BB	FX
2004	J.O. National Championships		4	4		1st place, gold medalist(s)	2nd place, silver medalist(s)
2005	Top Gym Competition		1st place, gold medalist(s)	1st place, gold medalist(s)			1st place, gold medalist(s)
2005	Secret U.S. Classic		3rd place, bronze medalist(s)			3rd place, bronze medalist(s)	
2005	U.S. National Championships		10	4	9		
2006	USA-Japan-New Zealand Friendly		1st place, gold medalist(s)	1st place, gold medalist(s)	3rd place, bronze medalist(s)	1st place, gold medalist(s)	2nd place, silver medalist(s)
2006	Int'l Gymnix		3rd place, bronze medalist(s)	2nd place, silver medalist(s)		5	1st place, gold medalist(s)
2006	Pacific Alliance Championships	1st place, gold medalist(s)	1st place, gold medalist(s)	1st place, gold medalist(s)		2nd place, silver medalist(s)	1st place, gold medalist(s)
2006	Pan American Championships	1st place, gold medalist(s)	1st place, gold medalist(s)		2nd place, silver medalist(s)	1st place, gold medalist(s)	2nd place, silver medalist(s)
2006	U.S. Classic		1st place, gold medalist(s)	2nd place, silver medalist(s)		3rd place, bronze medalist(s)	2nd place, silver medalist(s)
2006	U.S. National Championships		1st place, gold medalist(s)	1st place, gold medalist(s)	2nd place, silver medalist(s)	1st place, gold medalist(s)	1st place, gold medalist(s)

Competitive history of Shawn Johnson at the senior level
Year	Event	Team	AA	VT	UB	BB	FX
2007	American Cup		1st place, gold medalist(s)				
2007	USA-Great Britain Friendly	1st place, gold medalist(s)	1st place, gold medalist(s)	2nd place, silver medalist(s)		1st place, gold medalist(s)	
2007	Rio de Janeiro Pan American Games	1st place, gold medalist(s)	1st place, gold medalist(s)		1st place, gold medalist(s)	1st place, gold medalist(s)	2nd place, silver medalist(s)
2007	U.S. National Championships		1st place, gold medalist(s)		3rd place, bronze medalist(s)	1st place, gold medalist(s)	1st place, gold medalist(s)
2007	Suttgart World Championships	1st place, gold medalist(s)	1st place, gold medalist(s)			8	1st place, gold medalist(s)
2008	American Cup		2nd place, silver medalist(s)				
2008	Italy-Spain-Poland-USA Friendly	1st place, gold medalist(s)	1st place, gold medalist(s)				
2008	U.S. National Championships		1st place, gold medalist(s)		5	2nd place, silver medalist(s)	1st place, gold medalist(s)
2008	U.S. Olympic Trials		1st place, gold medalist(s)	2nd place, silver medalist(s)	4	1st place, gold medalist(s)	1st place, gold medalist(s)
2008	Beijing Olympic Games	2nd place, silver medalist(s)	2nd place, silver medalist(s)			1st place, gold medalist(s)	2nd place, silver medalist(s)
2011
2011	Guadalajara Pan American Games	1st place, gold medalist(s)			2nd place, silver medalist(s)		
2011	U.S. Classic				11	16	
2011	U.S. National Championships				6	4	

== See also ==
- List of Olympic female gymnasts for the United States

Awards and achievements
Preceded by Brooke Burke & Derek Hough	Dancing with the Stars (US) winners Season 8 (Spring 2009 with Mark Ballas)	Succeeded by Donny Osmond and Kym Johnson
