= Shayla Worley =

American artistic gymnast

- Nicknames: Lala, Shay
- Born: September 2, 1990 (age 36) Orlando, Florida, U.S.
- Height: 5 ft 4 in (163 cm)

Gymnastics career
- Discipline: Women's artistic gymnastics
- Country represented: United States
- College team: Georgia Gymdogs
- Club: Orlando Metro
- Head coach: Jeff Wood
- Assistant coach: Christi Barineau
- Music: Show
- Eponymous skills: Worley (balance beam)
Medal record
Gymnastics
World Championships
Gold medal – first place	2007 Stuttgart	Team
Pacific Alliance Championships
Gold medal – first place	2006 Honolulu	Team All-Around
Silver medal – second place	2006 Honolulu	Uneven Bars

Shayla Worley (born September 2, 1990) is an American artistic gymnast. She was a member of the gold-medal-winning American team at the 2007 World Artistic Gymnastics Championships. She trained for most of her athletic career at Orlando Metro Gymnastics, where she was coached by Jeff Wood and Christi Barineau. From 2009 to 2013, she competed at the University of Georgia, the 10-time NCAA champion in gymnastics.

== Junior career ==
Worley competed at Level 9 in 2001, placing first in the all-around competition at the Florida State Championships. Her final meet of the season was the Level 9 Eastern Championships, the highest meet to which a Level 9 gymnast can advance, where she placed second all-around. She finished off the Junior Olympic levels by placing second all-around at the 2002 Level 10 Florida State Championships.

In 2002, Worley became a junior national elite, now referred to as pre-elite. She won the all-around title at the American Challenge and also placed well at the U.S. Challenge.

She advanced to junior international elite in 2003. At the U.S. Classic, she placed high enough to qualify to the U.S. National Championships, where she finished fourth all-around. This earned her a spot on the United States national team.

In 2004, Worley helped the U.S. win a dual meet against Japan, and at the American Classic, she finished fourth all-around and again qualified to the U.S. National Championships. A few weeks later, she finished fourth all-around at the Pacific Alliance Championships. She also competed at the U.S. Classic, where she placed second all-around. In the fall, she won the all-around at the U.S. vs. Japan meet and was named to the Junior Pan American Games team, but could not compete because of a back injury.

Worley's final year as a junior was 2005. She started off her season at the International Tri Meet, which the United States won. She also went on a European tour that included meets against lower-ranked Great Britain and Switzerland; the U.S. won both. Her next competition was the U.S. Classic. A potential winner, she finished fourth all-around after falling on floor. At the national championships one month later, a fall on bars kept her down in the standings on Day 1. She battled back and tallied the highest all-around score on Day 2, finishing third overall behind Natasha Kelley. In her final meet of the season, the Massilia Cup, Worley only competed on bars, where she finished second.

== Senior career ==
Worley turned senior in 2006. Her first senior outing was the American Cup, where she finished second all-around behind Nastia Liukin. Next, she competed at the Pacific Alliance Championships, where she helped the U.S. win the team title and finished second on bars, making her the highest-placed American.

A hamstring injury prevented Worley from taking part in further competition in 2006. As a national team member who had scored well in the first half of the year, she had hopes of being named to the U.S. team for the World Championships in Aarhus, Denmark, but her injury kept her from competing.

Worley was ready in time for the 2007 American Cup, but a fall on her uneven bars dismount meant she narrowly missed qualifying for finals. She was also selected to compete in the Britain vs. U.S. dual match in Lisburn, Northern Ireland, on St. Patrick's Day. She made no major errors this time, and in the absence of the world's top two bars competitors, Britain's Beth Tweddle and American teammate Liukin, she took the bars title and finished second all-around. At the U.S. Classic, she only competed on bars and beam. She placed second on beam, but one of her grips ripped in the middle of her bar routine, causing her to place out of the top three. At the Visa Championships, she was the runner-up to Shawn Johnson and was also second on uneven bars. She was selected to represent the U.S. at the World Championships in Stuttgart, Germany.

At the World Championships, the U.S. team finished first overall in team qualifying, about four points ahead of the second-place team, China. Worley qualified eighth for the all-around competition, but Liukin and Johnson placed ahead of her, and because of rules permitting only two competitors per country, she was excluded from the final. She was also excluded from the balance beam final because of the two-athlete-per-country rule. During the team finals, she competed on bars and floor, scoring 15.575 and 14.675, respectively. The scores contributed to the U.S. total of 184.400, which earned the gold medal.

In 2008, Worley competed at the American Cup and finished third on vault and bars. She then traveled to Boston, Massachusetts, for the Visa National Championships, but had to pull out after aggravating a herniated disc in training the month before. She successfully petitioned to compete in the Olympic Trials, where she placed 14th all-around without competing on floor exercise. She was then invited to the final training camp in Texas, but ultimately was not chosen as an Olympic team member because of a broken leg. Soon after, she retired from elite gymnastics.

== Personal life ==
Worley attended William R. Boone High School in Orlando. Outside of gymnastics, she has competed in speech oration contests; modeled for Disney, Tupperware, and Lands' End; and done commercials for Disney and Universal Studios.

At the end of 2008, after retiring from elite gymnastics, Worley committed to NCAA-level gymnastics with the University of Georgia Gymdogs. She double majored in marketing and advertising.

Worley is also involved with the Cards for Hospitalized Kids foundation.

== Eponymous skill ==
Worley has one eponymous skill listed in the Code of Points.

Apparatus	Name	Description	Difficulty (Note: Valid for the 2025–2028 Code of Points)
Balance beam	Worley	Jump backward with ½ turn (180°) handspring to land on two feet	E (0.5)

== Competitive history ==
=== 2008 season ===
Year	Competition Description	Location	Apparatus	Rank-Final	Score-Final	Rank-Qualifying	Score-Qualifying
2008	U.S. Olympic Trials	Philadelphia	Vault	11 (Tie)			
2008	U.S. Olympic Trials	Philadelphia	Uneven Bars	11			
2008	U.S. Olympic Trials	Philadelphia	Balance Beam	7			
2008	American Cup	New York	All Around	4	60.400		

=== 2007 season ===
Year	Competition Description	Location	Apparatus	Rank-Final	Score-Final	Rank-Qualifying	Score-Qualifying
2007	World Championships	Stuttgart	Team	1	184.400	1	245.025
2007	World Championships	Stuttgart	All Around			8	60.075
2007	World Championships	Stuttgart	Uneven Bars			21	15.000
2007	World Championships	Stuttgart	Balance Beam			8	15.775
2007	World Championships	Stuttgart	Floor Exercise			11	14.650
2007	U.S. Championships	San Jose	All Around	2	120.200		
2007	U.S. Championships	San Jose	Uneven Bars	2			
2007	U.S. Championships	San Jose	Balance Beam	4			
2007	U.S. Championships	San Jose	Floor Exercise	4			
2007	U.S. Classic	Battle Creek, MI	Uneven Bars	13	12.950		
2007	U.S. Classic	Battle Creek, MI	Balance Beam	2	15.500		
2007	USA vs. Great Britain	Lisburn, Northern Ireland	Team	1			
2007	USA vs. Great Britain	Lisburn, Northern Ireland	All Around	2			
2007	USA vs. Great Britain	Lisburn, Northern Ireland	Uneven Bars	1			
2007	American Cup	Jacksonville	All Around			3	60.700

=== 2006 season ===
Year	Competition Description	Location	Apparatus	Rank-Final	Score-Final	Rank-Qualifying	Score-Qualifying
2006	Pacific Alliance Championships	Honolulu	Team	1	183.150		
2006	Pacific Alliance Championships	Honolulu	Uneven Bars	2	15.400	2	15.550
2006	American Cup	Philadelphia	All Around	2	59.775	2	60.000

=== 2005 season ===
Year	Competition Description	Location	Apparatus	Rank-Final	Score-Final	Rank-Qualifying	Score-Qualifying
2005	Massilia Gym Cup	Marseille	Team	2			
2005	Massilia Gym Cup	Marseille	Uneven Bars	2			
2005	International Team Challenge	Long Island, NY	Team	1			
