= Corrie Lothrop =

American gymnast

- Full name: Corrie Dong Quan Lothrop
- Born: March 26, 1992 (age 34) Wuhan, China

Gymnastics career
- Discipline: Women's artistic gymnastics
- Country represented: United States (2006–09 (USA))
- College team: University of Utah gymnastics
- Club: Hill's Gymnastics
- Head coaches: Greg Marsden, Megan Marsden
- Former coaches: Don Lothrop, Kelli Hill
Medal record
Representing United States
Pan American Championships
Gold medal – first place	2008 Rosario	Vault
Silver medal – second place	2008 Rosario	Uneven Bars
Silver medal – second place	2008 Rosario	Balance Beam
Silver medal – second place	2008 Rosario	Floor Exercise

Corrie Dong Quan Lothrop (born March 26, 1992, in Wuhan, China) is a former American artistic gymnast. She was an alternate for the United States' 2008 Olympic women's gymnastics team. She was adopted from China at age two. Corrie trained with Kelli Hill at her gym, Hill's Angels, which also produced Olympians Dominique Dawes, Elise Ray, and Courtney Kupets. She previously trained at her family gym, Yellow Jackets Gymnastics, in Middleton, Massachusetts. She was signed to the University of Utah for the 2010 season.

== Junior career ==
Corrie first qualified to Junior International Elite, after switching to Hill's Gymnastics in 2005. She skipped the US Classic with a minor injury. At her first nationals, Corrie placed third on vault, and sixth all-around, earning a spot on the National Team. She was chosen for a training camp with other Pan American gymnasts, but was then injured. Corrie competed at her first international meet in 2007, at the Gymnix International, where she won vault and three other bronze medals. Corrie then suffered an ankle injury that affected her performance at the US National Championships, but she did make her second national team.

== Senior career ==
Corrie's first year as a senior in 2008 she competed at the Friendship Exchange. She then competed at the US Classic where she placed 2nd all-around and won bars. Her next meet was the US National Championships, where she placed eighth all-around, once again earning a spot on a national team (her first senior team.) With that performance she qualified for the Olympic Trials. During the Olympic Trials she then was invited to the final selection camp, and was then named an alternate to the team. In the fall she was selected for the PAGU Event Championships where she won vault, and finished second on bars, beam and floor. At the International Gymnastics Challenge she won the all-around and helped the United States team win first place. Corrie then competed at the Maryland Classic in January 2009, in which she won vault and floor. At the Parkette Invitational she won vault, bars, beam, and the all-around. She was selected for the European Tour. She placed second all-around at the USA vs Germany meet. She also contributed at the USA vs France meet. While training for the elite season, Corrie tore her Achilles Tendon and was out for the rest of the season.

== College career ==
Lothrop started Utah University in the fall of 2010. She is majoring in Health Promotion and Education. In 2011, she injured her ankle. Later in 2013, during a floor warm up, she suffered season-ending injury
