= Jana Bieger =

American gymnast (born 1989)

- Full name: Jana Lyn Bieger
- Born: November 12, 1989 (age 36) Kiel, West Germany

Gymnastics career
- Discipline: Women's artistic gymnastics
- Country represented: United States (2003–2010)
- Gym: Bieger's
- Head coach: Andrea Bieger
Medal record
World Championships
Silver medal – second place	2006 Aarhus	Team
Silver medal – second place	2006 Aarhus	All-Around
Silver medal – second place	2006 Aarhus	Floor Exercise
Pacific Rim Championships
Gold medal – first place	2006 Honolulu	Team
Gold medal – first place	2006 Honolulu	Vault
Gold medal – first place	2006 Honolulu	Floor Exercise
Gold medal – first place	2008 San Jose	Team
Gold medal – first place	2008 San Jose	Uneven Bars
Silver medal – second place	2008 San Jose	All-Around
Bronze medal – third place	2008 San Jose	Balance Beam
Pan American Championships
Gold medal – first place	2005 Rio de Janeiro	Team
Silver medal – second place	2005 Rio de Janeiro	Vault
Silver medal – second place	2005 Rio de Janeiro	Floor Exercise

Jana Lyn Bieger (born November 12, 1989, in Kiel, West Germany) is an American former gymnast of German descent. She was raised in the U.S. and is a citizen, and competed only for the U.S. At the 2006 World Artistic Gymnastics Championships, she won three silver medals. Bieger was an alternate on the 2008 Olympic team.

== Personal life ==
Her parents are mother Andrea Bieger and father Wolfgang Heiden. Her mother and Wolfgang Heiden owned Bieger International Gymnastics, now closed. Andrea Bieger was a three-time Olympic gymnast for West Germany.

== Career ==
Bieger competed at her first U.S. National Championships in 2003, placing third on the vault in the junior division.

At the National Championships in 2004, she won a bronze medal in the all-around in the junior division and won the vault title, earning her first national team berth. The same year, she made her international debut, competing with the American junior team at the 2004 Pacific Alliance Championships and winning four medals: gold in the team event and vault final, and silver on the balance beam and in the all-around, behind teammate Nastia Liukin.

Bieger made her senior debut in 2005, placing third in the all-around, on vault, and on floor exercise at the National Championships. At the 2005 World Artistic Gymnastics Championships, she turned in a strong performances on the uneven bars (injury prevented her from competing on more than one apparatus) but was shut out of the finals because only two gymnasts from each country may participate in each event final. She was also a member of the American squad at the 2005 Pan American Games, where she placed first with the team and earned individual silver and bronze medals on the vault and floor exercise.

At the 2006 Cottbus Cup, part of the prestigious World Cup circuit, Bieger won gold on vault, silver on beam, and bronze on bars. At the 2006 Pacific Alliance Championships, she won gold in the team, vault, and floor exercise finals.

At the National Championships in August, she finished third in the all-around, maintaining her previous year's ranking. She also placed in the top six on all four events, winning a silver medal on the vault and a bronze on beam. In October, Bieger was a member of the silver medal-winning U.S. team at the World Championships in Aarhus, Denmark. She fell on vault during team finals but earned scores over 15.000 on the other three events, and later won the silver medal in the all-around. This result was controversial, in part because the gold medalist, Vanessa Ferrari of Italy, won despite a fall on the balance beam. Additionally, Ferrari and Bruno Grandi, the president of the International Federation of Gymnastics are both from Italy, which raised questions about the impartiality of the judging. Both gymnastics fans and officials from other countries, including the head of the Romanian team, Nicolae Forminte, publicly objected to the scoring and the final results. USA Gymnastics did not take an official stance.

After the all-around, Bieger competed in the floor exercise event final, where she won her third silver medal of the World Championships behind Cheng Fei of China. She also participated in the uneven bars final, replacing her injured teammate Chellsie Memmel, and finished in fifth place.

She sustained an ankle injury in early 2007 at the American Cup that took her out of competition for a while. She competed at the 2007 U.S. Nationals despite a lack of training, but did not do well and was not chosen for the World Championships team. She was scheduled to compete at the 2007 Cottbus Cup, but the U.S. national team coordinator, Márta Károlyi, pulled her from the meet, saying she was not prepared for international competition.

Bieger returned to international competition in 2008 at a small meet, competing on all events but floor. She went on to compete at the 2008 Pacific Rim Championships, where she won silver in the all-around and gold on the uneven bars.

After the 2008 Olympic Trials and selection camp, Bieger was named as an alternate to the 2008 Summer Olympics in Beijing, China. Although two gymnasts on the squad were injured, she was not allowed to compete. She expressed disappointment about the experience but continued to compete in 2009, making appearances at the CoverGirl Classic in July and the Visa National Championships in August. She made it to the final round of the team selection camp for the World Championships in October but was not chosen. Instead, she received a berth to the Croatia World Cup in November, alongside teammate Kytra Hunter.

She was inducted into the USA Gymnastics Hall of Fame as a member of the class of 2024.
