= Dominique Dawes =

American artistic gymnast (born 1976)

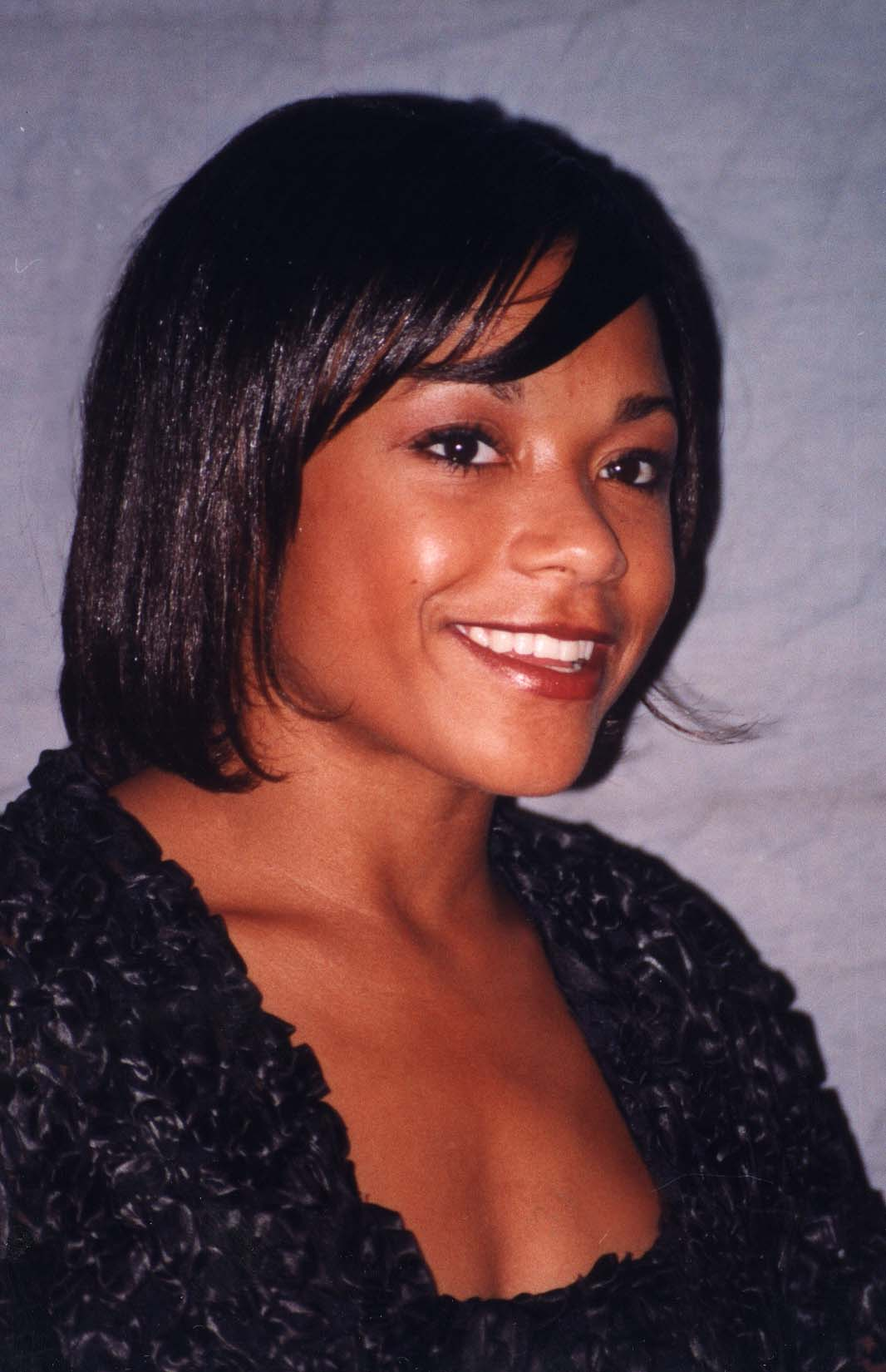
- Dawes in 1996

Personal information
- Full name: Dominique Margaux Dawes
- Nickname: Awesome Dawesome
- Born: November 20, 1976 (age 49) Silver Spring, Maryland, U.S.
- Height: 5 ft 2 in (157 cm)

Gymnastics career
- Discipline: Women's artistic gymnastics
- Country represented: United States; (1989–1998; 2000 (USA))
- Club: Hill's Angels
- Former coach: Kelli Hill
- Retired: September 19, 2000
Medal record
Representing United States
Women's artistic gymnastics
Olympic Games
Gold medal – first place	1996 Atlanta	Team
Bronze medal – third place	1992 Barcelona	Team
Bronze medal – third place	1996 Atlanta	Floor
Bronze medal – third place	2000 Sydney	Team
World Championships
Silver medal – second place	1993 Birmingham	Balance Beam
Silver medal – second place	1993 Birmingham	Uneven Bars
Silver medal – second place	1994 Dortmund	Team
Bronze medal – third place	1996 Puerto Rico	Balance Beam

Co-Chair of the President's Council on Fitness, Sports, and Nutrition
- In office 2010–2017 Serving with Drew Brees
- Preceded by: John Burke

Personal details
- Occupation: Gymnast, actress, singer
- Website: DominiqueDawes.com

Dominique Margaux Dawes (born November 20, 1976) is a retired American artistic gymnast. Known in the gymnastics community as 'Awesome Dawesome', she was a 10-year member of the U.S. national gymnastics team, the 1994 U.S. all-around senior National Champion, a three-time Olympian, a World Championship silver and bronze medalist, and a member of the gold-medal-winning "Magnificent Seven" team at the 1996 Summer Olympics in Atlanta. She is also the Olympic bronze medalist on floor exercise from the Atlanta games.

She is also one of only four female American gymnasts, along with Muriel Grossfeld, Linda Metheny-Mulvihill, and Simone Biles, to compete in three Olympics and was part of their medal-winning teams: Barcelona 1992 (bronze), Atlanta 1996 (gold), and Sydney 2000 (bronze). Dawes is the first female gymnast to be a part of three Olympic-medal-winning teams since Ludmilla Tourischeva won gold in Mexico City (1968), Munich (1972), and Montreal (1976). Since Dawes, Svetlana Khorkina and Simone Biles are the only gymnasts to accomplish this feat. Svetlana winning silver in Atlanta (1996) and Sydney (2000), and bronze in Athens (2004) and Simone winning gold in Rio (2016), silver in Tokyo (2020) and gold in Paris (2024).

In 2020 Dawes became a minority owner of The NWSL’s Washington Spirit, under the ownership of team owner Michele Kang.

In 2024, Dawes, as first announced by ESPN’s Adam Schefter, became a Limited Partner with the Atlanta Falcons ownership group, under the head ownership of team owner Arthur Blank.

== Early life ==
Dawes was born in Silver Spring, Maryland, on November 20, 1976, to Don and Loretta Dawes of Takoma Park, Maryland. She enrolled in gymnastics at age 6 with coach Kelli Hill and won her first competition at age 9. In high school, she moved to Gaithersburg, Maryland, to be closer to her coach's gym.

== Gymnastics career ==
=== Junior career ===
Dawes was competing as a junior elite by the age of 10. She placed 17th in the all-around junior division at her first U.S. National Championships in 1988. In 1989, at the age of 12, she was sent to Australia to compete in her first international meet, the Konica Grand Prix. By the early 1990s, Dawes was achieving success both nationally and internationally. She placed 3rd in the all-around in the junior division at the 1990 U.S. National Championships.

At the 1992 USA vs. Japan dual meet, the 15-year-old Dawes received a standing ovation, after an energetic floor routine in which she revived the back-to-back tumbling revolutionized by Soviet star Oksana Omelianchik. The judges were equally impressed, and gave her a perfect 10. Though she was not part of the 1991 World Championship team, Dawes continued to move up on the national and international scene throughout 1991 and 1992.

=== 1992–1995 ===
She placed 4th at the 1992 Olympic trials and was awarded a place on the United States Olympic team. Despite battling very painful tendinitis in both ankles and Osgood-Schlatter disease during pre-Olympic training, Dawes performed respectably throughout the competition, even having the boldness to try a brand-new move in her balance beam routine during team competition - back handspring to three layout stepouts. She also won over the crowd with a solid optional floor exercise routine and, with a mark of 9.925, tied with Kim Zmeskal for the highest score for the American team on the event. The team won bronze, and Dawes and teammate Betty Okino became the first African American females to win an Olympic medal in gymnastics.

Dawes only competed in the team competition in 1992, not breaking through as an all-around gymnast until 1993. She is probably best known for her performances at the 1993 and 1994 World Championships. In 1993, Dawes led the competition after three events, even beating her more famous teammate Shannon Miller. However, she decided to try her harder vault (1½ twisting layout Yurchenko) worth a 10.00 instead of simply a full-twisting layout Yurchenko, which had been devalued to a 9.8. She made the first vault, but slipped and fell on the second, immediately bursting into tears. With the new rule that both vaults were averaged in all-around competition, her fall dropped her to 4th overall while Miller won the title. Famously, after the vault fall Dawes's coach Kelli Hill exhorted her to be proud of her performance anyway, stating: "When did you ever think you would be in that position? You have to be happy with yourself. Come on. Be happy. Stand up and wave". Dawes did so and earned a standing ovation from the crowd. After this disappointment she rebounded in the event finals, winning two silver medals on bars and beam.

The same fate befell her in at the 1994 Worlds. Leading after three events, she again came to vault with a chance of winning the title. This time her mistake came on the first vault where Dawes over-rotated and hurled forward into a somersault. Her low score dropped her to 5th. Her mistakes continued throughout the event finals and left the championships without winning a single medal.

Dawes would finish her year on a positive note, however. She dominated the National Championships placing first in the all-around and all four event finals at the expense of rival Shannon Miller. It was the first year since 1969 that a gymnast had swept the competition. She went on to lead the American team to a silver medal at the World Team Championships in Dortmund, Germany posting the third highest all-around score in the process.

=== 1996 ===
Dawes struggled through a difficult 1995 riddled by wrist and ankle injuries. She finished fourth at nationals and was forced to sit out the World Championships that year. At the 1996 World Championships, Dawes missed out on a medal on the uneven bars but tied Liu Xuan for a bronze medal on the balance beam. At the 1996 U.S. National Championships Dawes swept all four event finals for the second time in her career making her the first gymnast ever to accomplish this feat twice. Dawes also finished first at the Olympic trials, earning a berth on the 1996 Olympic team at the age of 19. Dawes planned to attend Stanford University in fall 1995 but could not receive an athletic scholarship as she turned pro to train for the 1996 Summer Olympics|1996 Olympics.

=== 1996 Olympic Games ===
The team, later nicknamed Magnificent Seven, dominated the team competition. A key member of the team, Dawes performed without serious error and was the only team member to have all eight of her scores count towards the total. Along with Shannon Miller, Jaycie Phelps, Dominique Moceanu, Amanda Borden, Amy Chow and Kerri Strug, Dawes claimed her gold medal as part of the first American team to take the Olympic title.

Later in the week, however, Dawes lost yet another opportunity to win a major all-around title. Going into the competition, she was considered one of the heavy favorites to medal. She was ranked sixth overall among all competitors after the team event, and her scores from team optionals were the highest on the American team and the second highest overall. Dawes led the competition after two rotations, with Shannon Miller right behind her. Both gymnasts were on Floor Exercise for the 3rd rotation. Miller had a substantial mistake in her routine, knocking her out of the medals. On the middle tumbling pass of Dawes's floor routine, she under-rotated for fear that she might step out of bounds; she sat down the tumbling pass (and went out of bounds anyway) causing her position to plummet in the standings. NBC cameras zoomed in on Dawes, sitting in tears as her score from floor exercise was announced (it was an even 9.000), which led to numerous boos from the audience. She managed to pull out a decent Vault score, but finished 17th overall. In the Event Finals, she placed sixth on Vault and just out of the medals on Uneven Bars, but redeemed herself by winning Bronze in Floor Exercise finals, her first World Championship or Olympic medal in what had long been considered her best event.

=== 2000 Olympics ===
Between 1996 and 1998 Dawes competed in various professional meets but retreated from elite competition. She returned briefly in 1998 to participate in the Goodwill Games where she placed 19th in the Mixed Pairs event with Chainey Umphrey. However, she placed 9th all-around at 2000 U.S. Nationals and 7th at the Olympic Trials, and earned a spot on her third Olympic team.

In team preliminaries at the Sydney Olympics, Dawes posted the second highest score of the American team on uneven bars but the lowest on beam. In the team finals, she performed well on three events, contributing their highest beam score and 3rd highest bars score (a very high 9.7), and contributed to the team's bronze medal awarded April 28, 2010 when the International Olympic Committee stripped China of its 2000 team medal for an underage competitor.

== Education and life after gymnastics ==
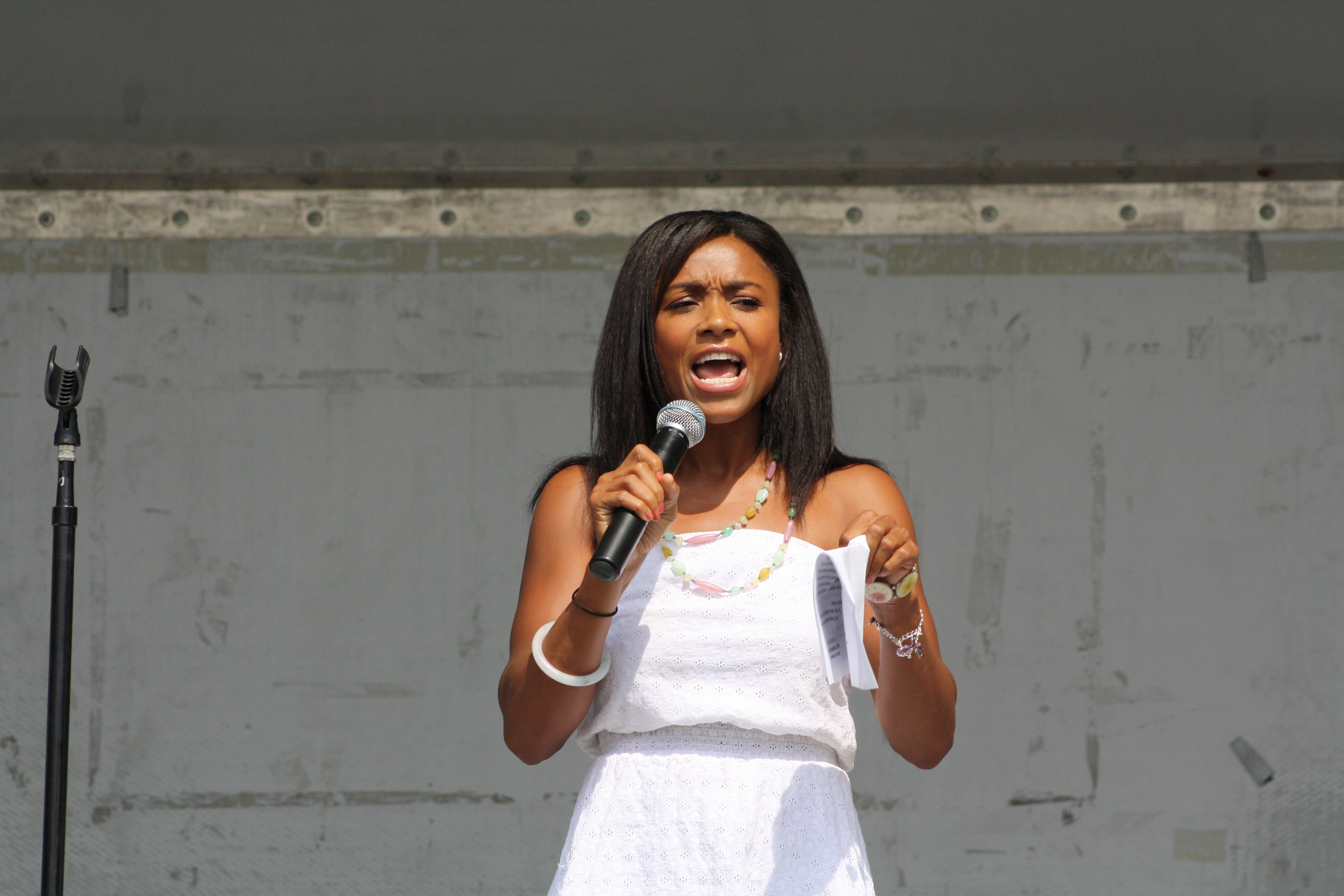
Olympic gold medalist Dominique Dawes at 2010 National Dance Day

Dawes attended Montgomery Blair High School in Silver Spring, Maryland, and Gaithersburg High School in Gaithersburg, Maryland, where she was the 1994 prom queen. She graduated with a bachelor's degree from the University of Maryland, College Park in 2002. Pursuing a career in acting, modeling, and television production, she appeared in Prince's music video "Betcha By Golly Wow" and Missy Elliott's 2006 video "We Run This" in the role of Missy's gymnastics coach. Dawes also briefly appeared on Broadway in a revival of the musical Grease, playing cheerleader Patty Simcox.

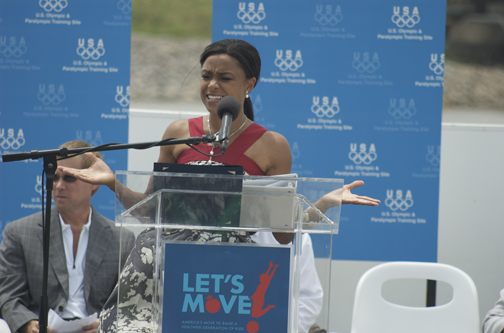
Dawes speaking at a physical fitness rally

Dawes served as president of the Women's Sports Foundation from 2004 to 2006; she was the youngest president in the Foundation's history. She was the first spokeswoman for the Girl Scouts of the USA's "Uniquely Me" self-esteem campaign in 2002. Dawes, whose younger brother is autistic, has supported events for autism awareness, such as the 2001 Power of One rally in Washington, D.C. She served on the Advisory Board of Sesame Workshop's "Healthy Habits for Life" program and also works as a motivational speaker, concentrating on youth issues. In June 2010, President Obama appointed Dawes and New Orleans Saints quarterback Drew Brees the co-chairs of the President's Council on Fitness, Sports and Nutrition.

She provided commentary for Yahoo's coverage of the Beijing Olympics in 2008 and for the 2010 Winter Olympics.

In 2010, Dawes wrote an article and produced a video for Yahoo Weekend News about Power Balance Bracelets, whose maker claimed that they improve balance, flexibility and strength. A 16-person trial found that the bracelets conveyed no advantage.

Dawes appeared with gymnasts Nadia Comăneci and Simone Biles in a commercial for Tide called "The Evolution of Power" before the 2016 Summer Olympics.

In 2022, she was to guest star as herself with Gabby Douglas and Laurie Hernandez in the episode "A Perfect 10" of the second season of the Disney+ animated series The Proud Family: Louder and Prouder, judging a gymnastics competition.

== Skills ==
- Vault: 1.5 twisting Yurchenko, Phelps (Tsukahara to layout Arabian front)
- Uneven Bars: Shaposhnikova transition to high bar, Hindorff release (free hip to straddled Tkatchev), 1.5 pirouette (Dawes), full pirouette, full-in dismount
- Balance Beam: Back-handspring followed by 3 layout stepouts; two back-handsprings to full-in dismount.
- Floor Exercise: Double layout; whip, back handspring, 2.5 twist, punch front (combination); piked full-in back out; double twist-punch front through to double tuck, double twist-punch front through to 2.5 twist-punch front (back-to-back tumbling runs). On floor, Dawes was known for her exhausting and technically intricate back-to-back tumbling passes.

Her music for floor routines:

- 1994 - Malagueña by Stanley Black Orchestra
- 1996 - Ukrainian Fantasy & Near the Valley by Kovriga Balalaika Orchestra
- 2000 - Samba by Armik

== Awards ==
- Inducted into the International Gymnastics Hall of Fame, 2009
- Inducted into the USA Olympic Hall of Fame (with the Magnificent Seven), 2008
- AAUW Women of Distinction Award, 2004
- "Caring Hands, Caring Hearts" Award, Ronald McDonald House Charities and Children Around the World, 2003
- Inducted into USA Gymnastics Hall of Fame, 1998
- Essence Award, 1997
- Olympic gold medalist in Atlanta, Georgia, 1996
- Henry P. Iba Citizen Award, presented annually to two outstanding athletes who have demonstrated good citizenship, 1995
- Sportsperson of the year by USA Gymnastics, 1994
- Finalist for the AAU Sullivan Award, which recognizes the USA's top amateur athlete, 1994
- Maryland Women's Hall of Fame, 2019
- Montgomery County Sports Hall of Fame, 2019

== Personal life ==
Dawes became engaged in December 2012 to teacher Jeff Thompson. Thompson taught at The Heights school in Potomac, Maryland; he returned to teaching in 2024. Dawes converted to Catholicism, and they married on May 25, 2013. The couple have four children: Kateri, Quinn, and twins Dakota and Lincoln. Dawes has said she suffered a near-fatal miscarriage before becoming pregnant with her twins.

== See also ==
- List of Olympic female gymnasts for the United States
