= 2008 Pan American Individual Event Artistic Gymnastics Championships =

International sports competition

The 2008 Pan American Individual Event Artistic Gymnastics Championships were held in Rosario, Argentina, November 19–23, 2008.

== Medalists ==
| Event | Gold | Silver | Bronze |
|---|---|---|---|
Men
| Floor exercise | Mario Berrios (PER) | Sebastian Melchiori (ARG) | Arthur Zanetti (BRA) |
| Pommel horse | Jose Fuentes (VEN) | Danell Leyva (USA) | Rafael Morales (PUR) |
| Rings | Regulo Carmona (VEN) | Federico Molinari (ARG) | Arthur Zanetti (BRA) |
| Vault | Daniel Corral (MEX) Sergio Ramos (PUR) | —N/a | Victor Camargo (BRA) |
| Parallel bars | Jose Fuentes (VEN) | Danell Leyva (USA) | Federico Molinari (ARG) |
| Horizontal bar | Danell Leyva (USA) | Jose Fuentes (VEN) | Lucas Chiarlo (ARG) |
Women
| Vault | Corrie Lothrop (USA) | Olivia Courtney (USA) | Ayelen Tarabini (ARG) Sidney Sanabria (PUR) |
| Uneven bars | Samantha Shapiro (USA) | Corrie Lothrop (USA) | Juliana Santos (BRA) |
| Balance beam | Samantha Shapiro (USA) | Corrie Lothrop (USA) | Yessenia Estrada (MEX) |
| Floor exercise | Olivia Courtney (USA) | Corrie Lothrop (USA) | Virginia Deluzio (ARG) |

== Medal table ==
| Rank | Nation | Gold | Silver | Bronze | Total |
|---|---|---|---|---|---|
| 1 | United States (USA) | 5 | 6 | 0 | 11 |
| 2 | Venezuela (VEN) | 3 | 1 | 0 | 4 |
| 3 | Puerto Rico (PUR) | 1 | 0 | 2 | 3 |
| 4 | Mexico (MEX) | 1 | 0 | 1 | 2 |
| 5 | Peru (PER) | 1 | 0 | 0 | 1 |
| 6 | Argentina (ARG) | 0 | 2 | 4 | 6 |
| 7 | Brazil (BRA) | 0 | 0 | 4 | 4 |
| Totals (7 entries) | | 11 | 9 | 11 | 31 |
