= Olivia Courtney =

American gymnast

- Full name: Olivia Chauntelle Fowler-Courtney
- Born: March 26, 1992 (age 34) Lackland Air Force Base, San Antonio, Texas

Gymnastics career
- Discipline: Women's artistic gymnastics
- Country represented: (2007–10 (US))
- College team: UCLA Bruins (2011–14)
- Training location: Orlando, Florida (2006–10); Westwood, Los Angeles (2010–14)
- Club: Orlando Metro
- Head coaches: Valorie Kondos Field (College); Jeff Wood (Club)
- Assistant coaches: Chris Waller (College); Christi Barineau (Club)
- Retired: from competitive gymnastics in 2014
Medal record
Representing United States
Pan American Championships
Gold medal – first place	2008 Rosario	Floor Exercise
Silver medal – second place	2008 Rosario	Vault

Olivia Chauntelle Fowler-Courtney (born March 26, 1992) is an American artistic gymnast, former US National Team member, and 11 time All American. She placed 10th All Around at the 2008 Olympic trials in Philadelphia, Pa. Olivia is a professional stunt performer, and the traffic gymnast in the seven time 2017 Golden Globes and six time 2017 Oscars winning film La La Land. Directed by Damien Chazelle starring Emma Stone, Ryan Gosling featuring John Legend.

== Early life ==
Olivia Chauntelle Fowler-Courtney, who goes by the name of Olivia (aka Liv) Courtney, was born on March 26, 1992, at Lackland Air Force Base in San Antonio, Texas, to Ivory Courtney, who was an avid boxer and Tonia Fowler-Courtney who retired from the USAF, and is employed by the US government. She has an elder sister, Crystal, who is a former Level 10 gymnast and competitiveMorehead State cheerleader. Olivia began gymnastics in Louisville Kentucky when she was just two years old. By the time she was four she was invited to join the junior pre team. Her first gymnastics performance was in front of a thousands of gymnastics fans at the 1996 gymnastics Olympic World Tour. Olivia advanced to level 5 at the age of six, but could not compete due to USAG's age requirement. One month after turning seven, Olivia competed her first competition at level 5, and won the All Around with a 35.40. Olivia competed level 6 at age seven. She spent the next two years at level 7. In 2002, she advanced to level 8 and became the Virginia All Around state champion. In the 2003/2004 competition season, Olivia competed one level 9 meet, advanced to level 10 qualifying to Level 10 Junior Olympics Championships (2004), and began her pursuit to become an elite gymnast. In 2005 Olivia won the junior American Challenge pre-elite optional completion, and Marta Karolyi invited her to the National Team training camp.
