= 2019 in artistic gymnastics =

Below is a list of notable men's and women's artistic gymnastics international events scheduled held in 2019, as well as the medalists.

== Calendar of events ==
Date	Location	Event	Men's winners	Women's winners
February 21–24	(Australia) Melbourne	Melbourne World Cup	FX: (Philippines) Carlos Yulo; PH: (Chinese Taipei) Lee Chih-kai; SR: (China) Liu Yang; VT: (Ukraine) Igor Radivilov; PB: (China) You Hao; HB: (Japan) Hidetaka Miyashi	VT: (South Korea) Yeo Seo-jeong; UB: (China) Fan Yilin; BB: (China) Zhao Shiting; FX: (Italy) Vanessa Ferrari
March 2	(United States) Greensboro	American Cup	AA: (United States) Yul Moldauer	AA: (United States) Leanne Wong
March 14–17	(Azerbaijan) Baku	Baku World Cup	FX: (Israel) Artem Dolgopyat; PH: (Japan) Kohei Kameyama; SR: (United Kingdom) Courtney Tulloch; VT: (South Korea) Yang Hak-seon; PB: (Russia) Vladislav Poliashov; HB: (Netherlands) Epke Zonderland	VT: (United States) Jade Carey; UB: (China) Lyu Jiaqi; BB: (Australia) Emma Nedov; FX: (United States) Jade Carey
March 16–17	(Germany) Stuttgart	Stuttgart World Cup	AA: (Russia) Artur Dalaloyan	AA: (United States) Simone Biles
March 20–23	(Qatar) Doha	Doha World Cup	FX: (Israel) Alexander Shatilov; PH: (Chinese Taipei) Lee Chih-kai; SR: (China) Lan Xingyu; VT: (South Korea) Yang Hak-seon; PB: (China) Zou Jingyuan; HB: (Croatia) Tin Srbić	VT: (United States) Jade Carey; UB: (Belgium) Nina Derwael; BB: (China) Li Qi; FX: (United States) Jade Carey
March 23	(United Kingdom) Birmingham	Birmingham World Cup	AA: (Russia) Nikita Nagornyy	AA: (Russia) Aliya Mustafina
April 7	(Japan) Tokyo	Tokyo World Cup	AA: (United States) Sam Mikulak	AA: (United States) Morgan Hurd
April 10–14	(Poland) Szczecin	European Championships	AA: (Russia) Nikita Nagornyy; FX: (Russia) Artur Dalaloyan; PH: (United Kingdom) Max Whitlock; SR: (Russia) Denis Ablyazin; VT: (Russia) Denis Ablyazin; PB: (Russia) Nikita Nagornyy; HB: (Netherlands) Epke Zonderland	AA: (France) Mélanie de Jesus dos Santos; VT: (Russia) Maria Paseka; UB: (Russia) Anastasia Ilyankova; BB: (United Kingdom) Alice Kinsella; FX: (France) Mélanie de Jesus dos Santos
May 19–21	(China) Zhaoqing	FIG World Challenge Cup	FX: (China) Deng Shudi; PH: (China) Zou Jingyuan; SR: (China) Liu Yang; VT: (North Korea) Kim Hyok; PB: (China) Zou Jingyuan; HB: (Japan) Takuya Sakakibara	VT: (China) Yu Linmin; UB: (China) Li Shijia; BB: (China) Li Shijia; FX: (China) Liu Jingxing
May 23–26	(Croatia) Osijek	FIG World Challenge Cup	FX: (Israel) Artem Dolgopyat; PH: (Croatia) Robert Seligman; SR: (Azerbaijan) Nikita Simonov; VT: (Hong Kong) Shek Wai Hung; PB: (Lithuania) Robert Tvorogal; HB: (Russia) Alexey Rostov	VT: (Slovenia) Teja Belak; UB: (Russia) Anastasiia Agafonova; BB: (Ukraine) Angelina Radivilova; FX: (Croatia) Ana Đerek
May 30–June 2	(Slovenia) Koper	FIG World Challenge Cup	FX: (Chile) Tomas Gonzalez; PH: (Republic of Ireland) Rhys McClenaghan; SR: (Azerbaijan) Nikita Simonov; VT: (Hong Kong) Shek Wai Hung; PB: (United Kingdom) Frank Baines; HB: (Turkey) Ümit Şamiloğlu	VT: (Azerbaijan) Marina Nekrasova; UB: (Hungary) Zsófia Kovács; BB: (Hungary) Zsófia Kovács; FX: (Switzerland) Ilaria Käslin
June 18–23	(Chile) Santiago	South American Championships	TF: Brazil; AA: (Brazil) Francisco Barretto; FX: (Brazil) Lucas Bitencourt; PH: (Brazil) Péricles Silva; SR: (Brazil) Lucas Bitencourt; VT: (Peru) Daniel Aguero; PB: (Venezuela) Jostyn Fuenmayor; HB: (Brazil) Arthur Mariano	TF: Argentina; AA: (Argentina) Abigail Magistrati; VT: (Argentina) Martina Dominici; UB: (Argentina) Valeria Pereyra; BB: (Peru) Ariana Orrego; FX: (Chile) Franchesca Santi
June 19–22	(Mongolia) Ulaanbaatar	Asian Championships	TF: China; AA: (Chinese Taipei) Lee Chih-kai; FX: (China) Yang Jiaxing; PH: (Jordan) Ahmad Abu al Soud; SR: (China) Lan Xingyu; VT: (China) Huang Mingqi; PB: (China) Liu Rongbing; HB: (China) Hu Xuwei	TF: China; AA: (China) Zhou Ruiyu; VT: (China) Yu Linmin; UB: (China) Lu Yufei; BB: (Chinese Taipei) Ting Hua-tien; FX: (Japan) Natsumi Hanashima
June 27–30	(Belarus) Minsk	European Games	AA: (Russia) David Belyavskiy; FX: (Finland) Emil Soravuo; PH: (Russia) David Belyavskiy; SR: (Italy) Marco Lodadio; VT: (Armenia) Artur Davtyan; PB: (Ukraine) Oleg Verniaiev; HB: (Lithuania) Robert Tvorogal	AA: (Russia) Angelina Melnikova; VT: (Slovenia) Teja Belak; UB: (Russia) Angelina Melnikova; BB: (Belgium) Nina Derwael; FX: (Ukraine) Anastasia Bachynska
June 27–30	(Hungary) Győr	World Junior Championships	TF: Japan; AA: (Japan) Shinnosuke Oka; FX: (South Korea) Ryu Sung-hyun; PH: (Japan) Takeru Kitazono; SR: (Canada) Félix Dolci; VT: (Romania) Gabriel Burtanete; PB: (Japan) Takeru Kitazono; HB: (Ukraine) Nazar Chepurnyi	TF: Russia; AA: (Russia) Viktoria Listunova; VT: (United States) Kayla DiCello; UB: (Russia) Vladislava Urazova; BB: (Russia) Elena Gerasimova; FX: (Russia) Viktoria Listunova
July 3–7	(Italy) Naples	Summer Universiade	TF: Japan; AA: (Japan) Kazuma Kaya; FX: (Russia) Kirill Prokopev; PH: (Chinese Taipei) Lee Chih-kai; SR: (Armenia) Artur Avetisyan; VT: (South Korea) Kim Han-sol; PB: (Japan) Kakeru Tanigawa; HB: (Chinese Taipei) Tang Chia-hung	TF: Japan; AA: (Japan) Hitomi Hatakeda; VT: (Azerbaijan) Marina Nekrasova; UB: (Japan) Hitomi Hatakeda; BB: (Japan) Hitomi Hatakeda; FX: (Italy) Carlotta Ferlito
July 22–26	(Azerbaijan) Baku	European Youth Olympic Festival	TF: Ukraine; AA: (Ukraine) Illia Kovtun; FX: (Ukraine) Nazar Chepurnyi; PH: (Ukraine) Nazar Chepurnyi; SR: (Russia) Mukhammadzhon Iakubov; VT: (United Kingdom) Raekwon Baptiste; PB: (Ukraine) Illia Kovtun; HB: (Ukraine) Illia Kovtun	TF: Russia; AA: (Russia) Viktoria Listunova; VT: (Russia) Viktoria Listunova; UB: (Russia) Viktoria Listunova; BB: (United Kingdom) Ondine Achampong; FX: (Russia) Viktoria Listunova
July 27–31	(Peru) Lima	Pan American Games	TF: Brazil; AA: (Brazil) Caio Souza; FX: (Chile) Tomás González; PH: (Brazil) Francisco Barretto; SR: (Mexico) Fabián de Luna; VT: (Dominican Republic) Audrys Nin Reyes; PB: (Mexico) Isaac Núñez; HB: (Brazil) Francisco Barretto	TF: United States; AA: (Canada) Ellie Black; VT: (Canada) Ellie Black; UB: (United States) Riley McCusker; BB: (United States) Kara Eaker; FX: (Canada) Brooklyn Moors
August 26–29	(Morocco) Casablanca	African Games	TF: Algeria; AA: (Algeria) Hillal Metidji; FX: (Algeria) Ahmed-anis Maoudj; PH: (Nigeria) Uche Eke; SR: (Egypt) Ali Zahran; VT: (Algeria) Mohamed Bourguieg; PB: (Algeria) Hillal Metidji; HB: (Egypt) Karim Mohamed	TF: Egypt; AA: (Egypt) Farah Hussein; VT: (Egypt) Nancy Taman; UB: (Egypt) Farah Hussein; BB: (Egypt) Farah Hussein; FX: (Egypt) Mandy Mohamed
September 6–8	(Hungary) Szombathely	FIG World Challenge Cup	FX: (Israel) Artem Dolgopyat; PH: (United Kingdom) Joshua Nathan; SR: (Ukraine) Igor Radivilov; VT: (Japan) Hidenobu Yonekura; PB: (Ukraine) Oleg Verniaiev; HB: (Hungary) David Vecsernyes	VT: (Azerbaijan) Marina Nekrasova; UB: (South Africa) Caitlin Rooscrantz; BB: (Hungary) Noémi Makra; FX: (Spain) Marina Gonzalez
September 14–15	(France) Paris	FIG World Challenge Cup	FX: (Japan) Kazuki Minami; PH: (United Kingdom) Joshua Nathan; SR: (Egypt) Ali Zahran and (France) Samir Aït Saïd; VT: (France) Loris Frasca; PB: (Japan) Kaito Sugimoto; HB: (Croatia) Tin Srbić	VT: (Uzbekistan) Oksana Chusovitina; UB: (France) Mélanie de Jesus dos Santos; BB: (Russia) Anastasiia Agafonova; FX: (Ukraine) Diana Varinska
September 19–22	(Portugal) Guimarães	FIG World Challenge Cup	FX: (Japan) Takaaki Sugino; PH: (Japan) Takaaki Sugino; SR: (Japan) Takuya Nagano; VT: (Poland) Sebastian Gawronski; PB: (Japan) Takuya Nagano; HB: (Japan) Hirohito Kohama	VT: (Puerto Rico) Paula Mejías; UB: (Mexico) Frida Esparza; BB: (Portugal) Ana Filipa Martins; FX: (Mexico) Ana Lago
October 4–13	(Germany) Stuttgart	World Championships	TF: Russia; AA: (Russia) Nikita Nagornyy; FX: (Philippines) Carlos Yulo; PH: (United Kingdom) Max Whitlock; SR: (Turkey) İbrahim Çolak; VT: (Russia) Nikita Nagornyy; PB: (United Kingdom) Joe Fraser; HB: (Brazil) Arthur Mariano	TF: United States; AA: (United States) Simone Biles; VT: (United States) Simone Biles; UB: (Belgium) Nina Derwael; BB: (United States) Simone Biles; FX: (United States) Simone Biles
October 10–27	(China) Wuhan	Military World Games	TF: China; AA: (China) Xiao Ruoteng; FX: (China) Deng Shudi; PH: (China) Zou Jingyuan; SR: (China) Liu Yang; VT: (China) Huang Minqi; PB: (China) Zou Jingyuan; HB: (China) Xiao Ruoteng	—N/a
November 21–24	(Germany) Cottbus	Cottbus World Cup	FX: (Japan) Kazuki Minami; PH: (China) Weng Hao; SR: (China) Liu Yang; VT: (Ukraine) Ihor Radivilov; PB: (Ukraine) Oleg Verniaiev; HB: (Japan) Hidetaka Miyachi	VT: (China) Yu Linmin; UB: (China) Fan Yilin; BB: (Japan) Urara Ashikawa; FX: (Ukraine) Anastasia Bachynska
November 30–December 11	(Philippines) Pasay	Southeast Asian Games	AA: (Philippines) Carlos Yulo; FX: (Philippines) Carlos Yulo; PH: (Malaysia) Tan Fu Jie; SR: (Vietnam) Đặng Nam; VT: (Indonesia) Agus Prayoko; PB: (Vietnam) Đinh Phương Thành; HB: (Vietnam) Đinh Phương Thành	AA: (Malaysia) Farah Ann Abdul Hadi; VT: (Indonesia) Rifda Irfanaluthfi; UB: (Malaysia) Farah Ann Abdul Hadi; BB: (Malaysia) Tracie Ang; FX: (Malaysia) Farah Ann Abdul Hadi

== Medalists ==
=== Men ===
==== International championships ====
Competition	Event	Gold	Silver	Bronze
World Junior Championships	Team	Japan	Ukraine	Italy
World Junior Championships	All-Around	(Japan) Shinnosuke Oka	(Japan) Ryosuke Doi	(Ukraine) Illia Kovtun
World Junior Championships	Floor Exercise	(South Korea) Ryu Sung-hyun	(Canada) Félix Dolci	(Ukraine) Nazar Chepurnyi
World Junior Championships	Pommel Horse	(Japan) Takeru Kitazono	(Japan) Shinnosuke Oka	(Latvia) Edvins Rodevics
World Junior Championships	Rings	(Canada) Félix Dolci	(Brazil) Diogo Soares	(China) Yang Haonan
World Junior Championships	Vault	(Romania) Gabriel Burtanete	(China) Yang Haonan	(United Kingdom) Jasper Smith-Gordon
World Junior Championships	Parallel Bars	(Japan) Takeru Kitazono	(China) Yang Haonan	(Japan) Shinnosuke Oka
World Junior Championships	Horizontal Bar	(Ukraine) Nazar Chepurnyi	(Russia) Ivan Gerget	(Hungary) Krisztián Balázs
World Championships	Team	Russia	China	Japan
World Championships	All-Around	(Russia) Nikita Nagornyy	(Russia) Artur Dalaloyan	(Ukraine) Oleg Verniaiev
World Championships	Floor Exercise	(Philippines) Carlos Yulo	(Israel) Artem Dolgopyat	(China) Xiao Ruoteng
World Championships	Pommel Horse	(United Kingdom) Max Whitlock	(Chinese Taipei) Lee Chih-kai	(Republic of Ireland) Rhys McClenaghan
World Championships	Rings	(Turkey) İbrahim Çolak	(Italy) Marco Lodadio	(France) Samir Aït Saïd
World Championships	Vault	(Russia) Nikita Nagornyy	(Russia) Artur Dalaloyan	(Ukraine) Igor Radivilov
World Championships	Parallel Bars	(United Kingdom) Joe Fraser	(Turkey) Ahmet Önder	(Japan) Kazuma Kaya
World Championships	Horizontal Bar	(Brazil) Arthur Mariano	(Croatia) Tin Srbić	(Russia) Artur Dalaloyan

==== Continental championships ====
Competition	Event	Gold	Silver	Bronze
European	All-Around	(Russia) Nikita Nagornyy	(Russia) Artur Dalaloyan	(Cyprus) Marios Georgiou
European	Floor Exercise	(Russia) Artur Dalaloyan	(Israel) Artem Dolgopyat	(Russia) Dmitrii Lankin
European	Pommel Horse	(United Kingdom) Max Whitlock	(France) Cyril Tommasone	(Russia) Vladislav Polyashov
European	Rings	(Russia) Denis Ablyazin	(Italy) Marco Lodadio	(Armenia) Vahagn Davtyan
European	Vault	(Russia) Denis Ablyazin	(Israel) Andrey Medvedev	(Russia) Artur Dalaloyan
European	Parallel Bars	(Russia) Nikita Nagornyy	(Ukraine) Petro Pakhniuk	(Turkey) Ferhat Arıcan
European	Horizontal Bar	(Netherlands) Epke Zonderland	(Croatia) Tin Srbić	(Russia) Artur Dalaloyan
Asian	Team	China	Japan	Chinese Taipei
Asian	All-Around	(Chinese Taipei) Lee Chih-kai	(China) Hu Xuwei	(China) Liu Rongbing
Asian	Floor Exercise	(China) Yang Jiaxing	(Kazakhstan) Milad Karimi	(Japan) Daisuke Fudono
Asian	Pommel Horse	(Jordan) Ahmad Abu al Soud	(Iran) Saeid Reza Keikha	(China) Liu Rongbing
Asian	Rings	(China) Lan Xingyu	(North Korea) Jong Ryong-il	(Iran) Mehdi Ahmad Kohani
Asian	Vault	(China) Huang Mingqi	(Indonesia) Muhammad Aprizal	(Kazakhstan) Milad Karimi
Asian	Parallel Bars	(China) Liu Rongbing	(China) Hu Xuwei	(Vietnam) Đinh Phương Thành
Asian	Horizontal Bar	(China) Hu Xuwei	(Chinese Taipei) Tang Chia-hung	(Vietnam) Le Thanh Tung
South American	Team	Brazil	Colombia	Venezuela
South American	All-Around	(Brazil) Francisco Barretto	(Brazil) Arthur Mariano	(Colombia) Andrés Martínez
South American	Floor Exercise	(Brazil) Lucas Bitencourt	(Uruguay) Victor Rostagno	(Brazil) Tomás Florêncio
South American	Pommel Horse	(Brazil) Péricles Silva	(Peru) Jesús Moreto	(Argentina) Santiago Mayol
South American	Rings	(Brazil) Lucas Bitencourt	(Colombia) Didier Lugo	(Venezuela) Jostyn Fuenmayor
South American	Vault	(Peru) Daniel Aguero	(Colombia) José David Toro	(Venezuela) Maycol Puentes
South American	Parallel Bars	(Venezuela) Jostyn Fuenmayor	(Colombia) Carlos Calvo	(Brazil) Péricles Silva
South American	Horizontal Bar	(Brazil) Arthur Mariano	(Brazil) Lucas Bitencourt	(Colombia) Javier Sandoval

==== Multi-sport events ====
Competition	Event	Gold	Silver	Bronze
European Games
European Games	All-Around	(Russia) David Belyavskiy	(Ukraine) Oleg Verniaiev	(Russia) Vladislav Polyashov
European Games	Floor Exercise	(Finland) Emil Soravuo	(United Kingdom) Giarnni Regini-Moran	(Ukraine) Petro Pakhniuk
European Games	Pommel Horse	(Russia) David Belyavskiy	(Ukraine) Oleg Verniaiev	(Belarus) Andrey Likhovitskiy
European Games	Rings	(Italy) Marco Lodadio	(Armenia) Vahagn Davtyan	(Ukraine) Igor Radivilov
European Games	Vault	(Armenia) Artur Davtyan	(Russia) Dmitriy Lankin	(Ukraine) Igor Radivilov
European Games	Parallel Bars	(Ukraine) Oleg Verniaiev	(Cyprus) Marios Georgiou	(Turkey) Ferhat Arıcan
European Games	Horizontal Bar	(Lithuania) Robert Tvorogal	(Turkey) Ahmet Önder	(Hungary) Dávid Vecsernyés
Summer Universiade	Team	Japan	Chinese Taipei	Russia
Summer Universiade	All-Around	(Japan) Kazuma Kaya	(Russia) Ivan Stretovich	(Chinese Taipei) Lee Chih-kai
Summer Universiade	Floor Exercise	(Russia) Kirill Prokopev	(Japan) Kazuma Kaya	(Japan) Kakeru Tanigawa
Summer Universiade	Pommel Horse	(Chinese Taipei) Lee Chih-kai	(Kazakhstan) Nariman Kurbanov	(Japan) Kazuma Kaya
Summer Universiade	Rings	(Armenia) Artur Avetisyan	(Austria) Vinzenz Höck (Turkey) İbrahim Çolak	—N/a
Summer Universiade	Vault	(South Korea) Kim Han-sol	(Belarus) Yahor Sharamkou	(Brazil) Luís Guilherme Porto
Summer Universiade	Parallel Bars	(Japan) Kakeru Tanigawa	(Russia) Ivan Stretovich	(Turkey) Ahmet Önder
Summer Universiade	Horizontal Bar	(Chinese Taipei) Tang Chia-hung	(Kazakhstan) Milad Karimi	(Russia) Ivan Stretovich
European Youth Olympic Festival	Team	Ukraine	Russia	Italy
European Youth Olympic Festival	All-Around	(Ukraine) Illia Kovtun	(Russia) Ivan Kuliak	(Russia) Mukhammadzhon Iakubov
European Youth Olympic Festival	Floor Exercise	(Ukraine) Nazar Chepurnyi	(Ukraine) Illia Kovtun	(Russia) Ivan Kuliak
European Youth Olympic Festival	Pommel Horse	(Ukraine) Nazar Chepurnyi	(Azerbaijan) Samad Mammadli	(Ukraine) Volodymyr Kostiuk
European Youth Olympic Festival	Rings	(Russia) Mukhammadzhon Iakubov	(Ukraine) Nazar Chepurnyi	(Russia) Ivan Kuliak
European Youth Olympic Festival	Vault	(United Kingdom) Raekwon Baptiste	(Romania) Robert Burtanete	(Romania) Gabriel Burtanete
European Youth Olympic Festival	Parallel Bars	(Ukraine) Illia Kovtun	(Ukraine) Volodymyr Kostiuk	(Hungary) Krisztian Balazs
European Youth Olympic Festival	Horizontal Bar	(Ukraine) Illia Kovtun	(France) Lucas Desanges	(Italy) Ivan Brunello
Pan American Games	Team	Brazil	United States	Canada
Pan American Games	All-Around	(Brazil) Caio Souza	(Brazil) Arthur Mariano	(Canada) Cory Paterson
Pan American Games	Floor Exercise	(Chile) Tomás González	(United States) Robert Neff	(Colombia) Andrés Martínez
Pan American Games	Pommel Horse	(Brazil) Fancisco Barretto	(United States) Robert Neff	(Colombia) Carlos Calvo
Pan American Games	Rings	(Mexico) Fabián de Luna	(Brazil) Arthur Zanetti	(Argentina) Federico Molinari
Pan American Games	Vault	(Dominican Republic) Audrys Nin	(Guatemala) Jorge Vega	(Cuba) Alejandro de la Cruz
Pan American Games	Parallel Bars	(Mexico) Isaac Núñez	(Brazil) Caio Souza	(United States) Cameron Bock
Pan American Games	Horizontal Bar	(Brazil) Fancisco Barretto	(Brazil) Arthur Mariano	(Cuba) Huber Godoy
African Games	Team	Algeria	Egypt	Morocco
African Games	All-Around	(Algeria) Hillal Metidji	(Algeria) Mohamed Bourguieg	(Egypt) Mohamed Moubarak
African Games	Floor Exercise	(Algeria) Ahmed-anis Maoudj	(Algeria) Mohamed Bourguieg	(Morocco) Nabil Zouhair
African Games	Pommel Horse	(Nigeria) Uche Eke	(Algeria) Mohamed Aouicha	(Tunisia) Wissem Harzi
African Games	Rings	(Egypt) Ali Zahran	(Algeria) Mohamed Bourguieg	(Egypt) Mohamed Moubarak
African Games	Vault	(Algeria) Mohamed Bourguieg	(Algeria) Ahmed-anis Maoudj	(Egypt) Mohamed Moubarak
African Games	Parallel Bars	(Algeria) Hillal Metidji	(Egypt) Zaid Khater	(Nigeria) Uche Eke
African Games	Horizontal Bar	(Egypt) Karim Mohamed	(Algeria) Hillal Metidji	(Algeria) Mohamed Aouicha
Military World Games	Team	China	Brazil	North Korea
Military World Games	All-Around	(China) Xiao Ruoteng	(China) Deng Shudi	(Brazil) Caio Souza
Military World Games	Floor Exercise	(China) Deng Shudi	(China) Xiao Ruoteng	(Brazil) Arthur Zanetti
Military World Games	Pommel Horse	(China) Zou Jingyuan	(China) Xiao Ruoteng	(Brazil) Francisco Barretto
Military World Games	Rings	(China) Liu Yang	(Brazil) Arthur Zanetti	(Armenia) Artur Avetisyan
Military World Games	Vault	(China) Huang Mingqi	(North Korea) Kim Chol	(North Korea) Ri Se-gwang
Military World Games	Parallel Bars	(China) Zou Jingyuan	(China) Xiao Ruoteng	(Brazil) Caio Souza
Military World Games	Horizontal Bar	(China) Xiao Ruoteng	(China) Deng Shudi	(Brazil) Francisco Barretto
Southeast Asian Games
Southeast Asian Games	All-Around	(Philippines) Carlos Yulo	(Vietnam) Đinh Phương Thành	(Vietnam) Lê Thanh Tùng
Southeast Asian Games	Floor Exercise	(Philippines) Carlos Yulo	(Thailand) Tikumporn Surintornta	(Malaysia) Zul Bahrin Mat Asri
Southeast Asian Games	Pommel Horse	(Malaysia) Tan Fu Jie	(Philippines) Carlos Yulo	(Vietnam) Đinh Phương Thành
Southeast Asian Games	Rings	(Vietnam) Đặng Nam	(Philippines) Carlos Yulo	(Indonesia) Dwi Arifin
Southeast Asian Games	Vault	(Indonesia) Agus Prayoko	(Philippines) Carlos Yulo	(Vietnam) Lê Thanh Tùng
Southeast Asian Games	Parallel Bars	(Vietnam) Đinh Phương Thành	(Philippines) Carlos Yulo	(Vietnam) Lê Thanh Tùng
Southeast Asian Games	Horizontal Bar	(Vietnam) Đinh Phương Thành	(Philippines) Carlos Yulo	(Singapore) Sean Yeo Xong

=== Women ===
==== International championships ====
Competition	Event	Gold	Silver	Bronze
Junior World Championships	Team	Russia	China	United States
Junior World Championships	All-Around	(Russia) Viktoria Listunova	(Russia) Vladislava Urazova	(China) Ou Yushan
Junior World Championships	Vault	(United States) Kayla DiCello	(United Kingdom) Jennifer Gadirova	(Russia) Vladislava Urazova
Junior World Championships	Uneven Bars	(Russia) Vladislava Urazova	(Russia) Viktoria Listunova	(China) Wei Xiaoyuan
Junior World Championships	Balance Beam	(Russia) Elena Gerasimova	(China) Wei Xiaoyuan	(United States) Kayla DiCello
Junior World Championships	Floor Exercise	(Russia) Viktoria Listunova	(China) Ou Yushan	(Russia) Elena Gerasimova
World Championships	Team	United States	Russia	Italy
World Championships	All-Around	(United States) Simone Biles	(China) Tang Xijing	(Russia) Angelina Melnikova
World Championships	Vault	(United States) Simone Biles	(United States) Jade Carey	(United Kingdom) Ellie Downie
World Championships	Uneven Bars	(Belgium) Nina Derwael	(United Kingdom) Becky Downie	(United States) Sunisa Lee
World Championships	Balance Beam	(United States) Simone Biles	(China) Liu Tingting	(China) Li Shijia
World Championships	Floor Exercise	(United States) Simone Biles	(United States) Sunisa Lee	(Russia) Angelina Melnikova

==== Continental championships ====
Competition	Event	Gold	Silver	Bronze
European	All-Around	(France) Mélanie de Jesus dos Santos	(United Kingdom) Ellie Downie	(Russia) Angelina Melnikova
European	Vault	(Russia) Maria Paseka	(France) Coline Devillard	(United Kingdom) Ellie Downie
European	Uneven Bars	(Russia) Anastasia Ilyankova	(Russia) Angelina Melnikova	(Italy) Alice D'Amato
European	Balance Beam	(United Kingdom) Alice Kinsella	(France) Mélanie de Jesus dos Santos	(France) Lorette Charpy
European	Floor Exercise	(France) Mélanie de Jesus dos Santos	(Netherlands) Eythora Thorsdottir	(Russia) Angelina Melnikova
Asian	Team	China	Japan	South Korea
Asian	All-Around	(China) Zhou Ruiyu	(China) Lu Yufei	(Japan) Natsumi Hanashima
Asian	Vault	(China) Yu Linmin	(Japan) Ayaka Sakaguchi	(India) Pranati Nayak
Asian	Uneven Bars	(China) Lu Yufei	(China) Zhou Ruiyu	(South Korea) Lee Eun-ju
Asian	Balance Beam	(Chinese Taipei) Ting Hua-tien	(South Korea) Lee Eun-ju	(China) Zhou Ruiyu
Asian	Floor Exercise	(Japan) Natsumi Hanashima	(South Korea) Lee Eun-ju	(China) Liu Jieyu
South American	Team	Argentina	Chile	Peru
South American	All-Around	(Argentina) Abigail Magistrati	(Peru) Ariana Orrego	(Argentina) Agustina Pisos
South American	Vault	(Argentina) Martina Dominici	(Chile) Franchesca Santi	(Bolivia) Diana Vazquez
South American	Uneven Bars	(Argentina) Valeria Pereyra	(Argentina) Luna Fernandez	(Colombia) Angie Rodriguez
South American	Balance Beam	(Peru) Ariana Orrego	(Argentina) Abigail Magistrati	(Colombia) Angie Rodriguez
South American	Floor Exercise	(Chile) Franchesca Santi	(Peru) Ariana Orrego	(Venezuela) Katriel de Sousa

==== Multi-sport events ====
Competition	Event	Gold	Silver	Bronze
European Games
European Games	All-Around	(Russia) Angelina Melnikova	(France) Lorette Charpy	(Ukraine) Diana Varinska
European Games	Vault	(Slovenia) Teja Belak	(Russia) Angelina Melnikova	(Hungary) Sára Péter
European Games	Uneven Bars	(Russia) Angelina Melnikova	(United Kingdom) Becky Downie	(Belarus) Anastasiya Alistratava
European Games	Balance Beam	(Belgium) Nina Derwael	(Russia) Angelina Melnikova	(Ukraine) Diana Varinska
European Games	Floor Exercise	(Ukraine) Anastasia Bachynska	(Czech Republic) Aneta Holasová	(Sweden) Jessica Castles
Summer Universiade	Team	Japan	Russia	Italy
Summer Universiade	All-Around	(Japan) Hitomi Hatakeda	(Russia) Ulyana Perebinosova	(Russia) Lilia Akhaimova
Summer Universiade	Vault	(Azerbaijan) Marina Nekrasova	(Russia) Lilia Akhaimova	(Russia) Tatiana Nabieva
Summer Universiade	Uneven Bars	(Japan) Hitomi Hatakeda	(Russia) Tatiana Nabieva	(Japan) Asuka Teramoto
Summer Universiade	Balance Beam	(Japan) Hitomi Hatakeda	(Italy) Lara Mori	(Russia) Ulyana Perebinosova
Summer Universiade	Floor Exercise	(Italy) Carlotta Ferlito	(Japan) Aiko Sugihara	(Russia) Ulyana Perebinosova
European Youth Olympic Festival	Team	Russia	Romania	(United Kingdom) Great Britain
European Youth Olympic Festival	All-Around	(Russia) Viktoria Listunova	(United Kingdom) Ondine Achampong	(Russia) Yana Vorona
European Youth Olympic Festival	Vault	(Russia) Viktoria Listunova	(Ukraine) Anastasiia Motak	(Romania) Silviana Sfiringu
European Youth Olympic Festival	Uneven Bars	(Russia) Viktoria Listunova	(Russia) Irina Komnova	(Romania) Ioana Stanciulescu
European Youth Olympic Festival	Balance Beam	(United Kingdom) Ondine Achampong	(Romania) Silviana Sfiringu	(France) Claire Passeron
European Youth Olympic Festival	Floor Exercise	(Russia) Viktoria Listunova	(Romania) Ioana Stanciulescu	(Romania) Silviana Sfiringu
Pan American Games	Team	United States	Canada	Brazil
Pan American Games	All-Around	(Canada) Ellie Black	(United States) Riley McCusker	(Brazil) Flávia Saraiva
Pan American Games	Vault	(Canada) Ellie Black	(Cuba) Yesenia Ferrera	(Canada) Shallon Olsen
Pan American Games	Uneven Bars	(United States) Riley McCusker	(United States) Leanne Wong	(Canada) Ellie Black
Pan American Games	Balance Beam	(United States) Kara Eaker	(Canada) Ellie Black	(United States) Riley McCusker
Pan American Games	Floor Exercise	(Canada) Brooklyn Moors	(United States) Kara Eaker	(Brazil) Flávia Saraiva
African Games	Team	Egypt	Algeria	Nigeria
African Games	All-Around	(Egypt) Farah Hussein	(Egypt) Farah Salem	(Algeria) Lahna Salem
African Games	Vault	(Egypt) Nancy Taman	(Egypt) Farah Salem	(Tunisia) Chahed Sakr
African Games	Uneven Bars	(Egypt) Farah Hussein	(Egypt) Zeina Ibrahim	(Algeria) Lahna Salem
African Games	Balance Beam	(Egypt) Farah Hussein	(Egypt) Mandy Mohamed	(Algeria) Sofia Nair
African Games	Floor Exercise	(Egypt) Mandy Mohamed	(Egypt) Nancy Taman	(Algeria) Lahna Salem
Southeast Asian Games
Southeast Asian Games	All-Around	(Malaysia) Farah Ann Abdul Hadi	(Indonesia) Rifda Irfanaluthfi	(Malaysia) Tan Ing Yueh
Southeast Asian Games	Vault	(Indonesia) Rifda Irfanaluthfi	(Malaysia) Tan Ing Yueh	(Vietnam) Đỗ Thị Vân Anh
Southeast Asian Games	Uneven Bars	(Malaysia) Farah Ann Abdul Hadi	(Vietnam) Đỗ Thị Ngọc Hương	(Malaysia) Rachel Yeoh Li Wen
Southeast Asian Games	Balance Beam	(Malaysia) Tracie Ang	(Indonesia) Rifda Irfanaluthfi	(Vietnam) Đỗ Thị Vân Anh
Southeast Asian Games	Floor Exercise	(Malaysia) Farah Ann Abdul Hadi	(Indonesia) Rifda Irfanaluthfi	(Vietnam) Trần Đoàn Quỳnh Nam

== Season's best international scores ==
Only the scores of senior gymnasts from international events have been included below; one score per gymnast.

=== Women ===
==== All-around ====
Rank	Name	Country	Score	Event
1	Simone Biles	United States	59.766	World Championships TF
2	Sunisa Lee	United States	57.166	World Championships QF
3	Riley McCusker	United States	57.050	Pan American Games QF
4	Rebeca Andrade	Brazil	56.932	DTB Team Challenge TF
5	Tang Xijing	China	56.899	World Championships AA
6	Mélanie de Jesus dos Santos	France	56.782	World Championships QF
7	Leanne Wong	United States	56.765	American Cup
8	Kara Eaker	United States	56.700	Pan American Games QF
9	Angelina Melnikova	Russia	56.599	World Championships QF
10	Grace McCallum	United States	56.465	American Cup
11	Ellie Black	Canada	56.232	World Championships AA
12	Nina Derwael	Belgium	56.033	World Championships AA
13	Elisabeth Seitz	Germany	55.999	World Championships AA
14	Liu Tingting	China	55.901	City of Jesolo Trophy AA
15	Emma Malabuyo	United States	55.899	City of Jesolo Trophy AA
16	Giorgia Villa	Italy	55.832	World Championships TF
17	Li Shijia	China	55.732	World Championships QF
17	Flávia Saraiva	Brazil	55.732	World Championships AA
17	Mai Murakami	Japan	55.732	American Cup
20	Ellie Downie	Great Britain	55.365	European Championships AA

==== Vault ====
Rank	Name	Country	Score	Event
1	Simone Biles	United States	15.399	World Championships EF
2	Jade Carey	United States	15.200	World Championships QF
3	Maria Paseka	Russia	14.850	Doha World Cup EF
4	Yeo Seo-jeong	South Korea	14.817	Korea Cup
5	Ellie Downie	Great Britain	14.816	World Championships EF
5	Alexa Moreno	Mexico	14.816	World Championships QF
7	Shallon Olsen	Canada	14.733	World Championships EF
8	Yu Linman	China	14.704	Cottbus World Cup QF
9	Qi Qi	China	14.650	World Championships EF
10	Coline Devillard	France	14.633	Doha World Cup QF

==== Uneven bars ====
Rank	Name	Country	Score	Event
1	Nina Derwael	Belgium	15.300	Worms Friendly
2	Daria Spiridonova	Russia	15.016	World Championships QF
3	Sunisa Lee	United States	15.000	World Championships QF
3	Becky Downie	Great Britain	15.000	World Championships EF
5	Fan Yilin	China	14.933	Doha World Cup EF
6	Riley McCusker	United States	14.900	Pan American Games QF
6	Elisabeth Seitz	Germany	14.900	Swiss Cup
8	Anastasia Iliankova	Russia	14.833	European Championships EF
9	Liu Tingting	China	14.766	World Championships QF
10	Simone Biles	United States	14.733	World Championships QF
10	Angelina Melnikova	Russia	14.733	World Championships EF
10	Anastasia Agafonova	Russia	14.733	Cottbus World Cup EF

==== Balance beam ====
Rank	Name	Country	Score	Event
1	Kara Eaker	United States	15.266	Pan American Games EF
2	Simone Biles	United States	15.066	World Championships EF
3	Li Shijia	China	15.050	Zhaoqing Challenge Cup EF
4	Liu Tingting	China	14.967	City of Jesolo Trophy AA
5	Tang Xijing	China	14.600	World Championships AA
6	Li Qi	China	14.500	Cottbus World Cup QF
7	Giorgia Villa	Italy	14.467	Heerenveen Friendly
8	Emma Malabuyo	United States	14.400	City of Jesolo Trophy EF
9	Ana Padurariu	Canada	14.333	Stuttgart World Cup
10	Riley McCusker	United States	14.250	Pan American Games QF

==== Floor exercise ====
Rank	Name	Country	Score	
1	Simone Biles	United States	15.333	World Championships TF
2	Jade Carey	United States	14.600	Baku World Cup EF
3	Sunisa Lee	United States	14.333	City of Jesolo Trophy AA
4	Emma Malabuyo	United States	14.233	City of Jesolo Trophy AA
5	Mélanie de Jesus dos Santos	France	14.166	World Championships TF
5	Angelina Melnikova	Russia	14.166	World Championships QF
7	Rebeca Andrade	Brazil	14.133	DTB Team Challenge TF
7	Mai Murakami	Japan	14.133	American Cup
9	Riley McCusker	United States	14.050	Pan American Games QF
10	Flávia Saraiva	Brazil	13.933	World Championships AA
10	Lilia Akhaimova	Russia	13.933	World Championships QF

=== Men ===
==== All-Around ====
Rank	Name	Country	Score	Event
1	Nikita Nagornyy	Russia	88.772	World Championships AA
2	Artur Dalaloyan	Russia	87.930	European Championships QF
3	Kazuma Kaya	Japan	87.000	Summer Universiade AA
4	Oleg Verniaiev	Ukraine	86.973	World Championships AA
5	Sam Mikulak	United States	86.931	World Championships TF
6	Xiao Ruoteng	China	86.690	World Championships AA
7	Sun Wei	China	86.523	World Championships AA
8	David Belyavskiy	Russia	86.499	European Games QF
9	Yul Moldauer	United States	85.932	American Cup
10	Wataru Tanigawa	China	85.665	Tokyo World Cup
11	Joe Fraser	Great Britain	85.098	World Championships AA
12	Petro Pakhniuk	Ukraine	84.931	World Championships AA
13	Carlos Yulo	Philippines	84.900	Southeast Asian Games AA
14	Ahmet Önder	Turkey	84.798	European Championships QF
15	Lee Chih-kai	Chinese Taipei	84.481	World Championships QF
16	Ma Yue	China	84.465	American Cup
17	Vladislav Poliashov	Russia	84.464	European Games AA
18	Artur Davtyan	Armenia	84.450	Voronin Cup
19	Marios Georgiou	Cyprus	84.398	European Championships AA
20	Ivan Stretovich	Russia	84.375	Summer Universiade AA

==== Floor exercise ====
Rank	Name	Country	Score	
1	Artem Dolgopyat	Israel	15.355	European Championships QF
2	Carlos Yulo	Philippines	15.300	World Championships EF
3	Artur Dalaloyan	Russia	15.200	World Championships AA
4	Kirill Prokopev	Russia	15.100	Summer Universiade TF
4	Kazuki Minami	Japan	15.100	Paris Challenge Cup EF
6	Nikita Nagornyy	Russia	15.041	World Championships AA
7	Xiao Ruoteng	China	15.033	World Championships TF
8	Lin Chaopan	China	14.933	World Championships QF
9	Rayderley Zapata	Spain	14.850	Paris Challenge Cup QF
10	Benjamin Gischard	Switzerland	14.800	European Championships QF
10	Kazuma Kaya	Japan	14.800	Summer Universiade TF
10	Dmitriy Lankin	Russia	14.800	European Championships EF

==== Pommel Horse ====
Rank	Name	Country	Score	
1	Max Whitlock	Great Britain	15.533	European Championships EF
2	Rhys McClenaghan	Ireland	15.450	Koper Challenge Cup EF
3	Lee Chih-kai	Chinese Taipei	15.433	World Championships EF
3	Kohei Kameyama	Japan	15.433	Doha World Cup EF
5	Weng Hao	China	15.350	Zhaoqing Challenge Cup QF
6	Kaito Imabayashi	Japan	15.333	Doha World Cup EF
7	Zou Jingyuan	China	15.200	Zhaoqing Challenge Cup EF
8	Saeedreza Keikha	Iran	15.133	Doha World Cup EF
8	Oleg Verniaiev	Ukraine	15.133	European Games QF
10	Cyril Tommasone	France	15.100	European Games QF

==== Rings ====
Rank	Name	Country	Score	
1	Liu Yang	China	15.400	Zhaoqing Challenge Cup EF
2	Lan Xingyu	China	15.166	Doha World Cup QF
3	You Hao	China	15.133	Melbourne World Cup EF
4	İbrahim Çolak	Turkey	15.000	Mersin Challenge Cup EF
4	Grigoriy Klimentiev	Russia	15.000	Voronin Cup
6	Denis Ablyazin	Russia	14.966	European Championships EF
6	Marco Lodadio	Italy	14.966	European Championships EF
6	Arthur Zanetti	Brazil	14.966	Melbourne World Cup EF
9	Samir Aït Saïd	France	14.950	Paris Challenge Cup EF
9	Ali Zahran	Egypt	14.950	Paris Challenge Cup EF

==== Vault ====
Rank	Name	Country	Score	
1	Yang Hak-seon	South Korea	15.266	Coha World Cup EF
2	Hidenobu Yonekura	Japan	15.049	Szombathely Challenge Cup EF
3	Artur Davtyan	Armenia	15.016	European Games EF
4	Nikita Nagornyy	Russia	14.966	World Championships EF
5	Igor Radivilov	Ukraine	15.950	European Games QF
5	Denis Ablyazin	Russia	14.950	European Championships EF
7	Artur Dalaloyan	Russia	14.933	World Championships EF
8	Loris Frasca	France	14.900	Melbourne World Cup EF
9	Shek Wai Hung	Hong Kong	14.800	Osijek Challenge Cup EF

==== Parallel Bars ====
Rank	Name	Country	Score	
1	Zou Jingyuan	China	16.383	World Championships TF
2	Oleg Verniaiev	Ukraine	15.475	World Championships AA
3	Nikita Nagornyy	Russia	15.466	European Championships EF
4	David Belyavskiy	Russia	15.433	European Games AA
5	Artur Dalaloyan	Russia	15.400	Swiss Cup
6	Petro Pakhniuk	Ukraine	15.333	European Championships EF
7	Sam Mikulak	United States	15.325	World Championships AA
8	Ferhat Arıcan	Turkey	15.300	Heerenveen Friendly
8	Kaito Sugimoto	Japan	15.300	Paris Challenge Cup EF
10	Liu Rongbing	China	15.267	Asian Championships AA

==== Horizontal Bar ====
Rank	Name	Country	Score	
1	Epke Zonderland	Netherlands	15.266	European Championships EF
2	Tang Chia-hung	Chinese Taipei	14.933	World Championships QF
3	Tin Srbić	Croatia	14.900	European Championships EF
4	Sam Mikulak	United States	14.866	World Championships QF
5	Hidetaka Miyachi	Japan	14.733	Melbourne World Cup EF
5	Artur Dalaloyan	Russia	14.733	European Championships AA
7	Sergei Eltsov	Russia	14.700	Paris Challenge Cup EF
8	Milad Karimi	Kazakhstan	14.675	Summer Universiade EF
9	Ivan Stretovich	Russia	14.666	World Championships TF
10	Kakeru Tanigawa	Japan	14.625	Summer Universiade TF
