= Pan American Artistic Gymnastics Championships – Men's vault =

The Pan American Gymnastics Championships were first held in 1997.

Three medals are awarded: gold for first place, silver for second place, and bronze for third place.

== Medalists ==
Year	Location	Gold	Silver	Bronze	Ref
1997	(Colombia) Medellín	(Cuba) Lazaro Lamelas Ramirez (Cuba) Yoandy Diaz	—N/a	(Venezuela) Pablo Capote	
2001	(Mexico) Cancún	(Cuba) Charles Tamayo	(Cuba) Erick López	(United States) Todd Thornton	
2004	(Venezuela) Maracaibo	(United States) Jonathan Horton	(Brazil) Victor Rosa	(Venezuela) Pablo Capote	
2005	(Brazil) Rio de Janeiro	(Cuba) Abel Driggs Santos	(Venezuela) Fernando Fuentes	(Chile) Felipe Piña	
2008	(Argentina) Rosario	(Mexico) Daniel Corral (Puerto Rico) Sergio Ramos	—N/a	(Brazil) Victor Camargo	
2010	(Mexico) Guadalajara	(Chile) Tomás González	(Brazil) Sérgio Sasaki	(Puerto Rico) Luis Rivera	
2012	(Colombia) Medellín	(Puerto Rico) Angel Ramos	(Chile) Juan González	(Brazil) Petrix Barbosa	
2013	(Puerto Rico) San Juan	(Cuba) Manrique Larduet	(Brazil) Diego Hypólito	(Puerto Rico) Angel Ramos	
2014	(Canada) Mississauga	(Brazil) Sérgio Sasaki	(Guatemala) Jorge Vega	(Brazil) Caio Souza	
2016	(Bolivia) Sucre	(Guatemala) Jorge Vega	(Colombia) Dilan Jiménez	(Uruguay) Victor Rostagno	
2017	(Peru) Lima	(Dominican Republic) Audrys Nin Reyes	(Mexico) Joshua Valle	(Guatemala) Jorge Vega	
2018	(Peru) Lima	(Brazil) Caio Souza	(Peru) Daniel Aguero	(Colombia) José David Toro	
2021	(Brazil) Rio de Janeiro	(Brazil) Caio Souza	(Mexico) Fabián de Luna	(Argentina) Daniel Villafañe	
2022	(Brazil) Rio de Janeiro	(Brazil) Caio Souza	(Canada) Félix Dolci	(Argentina) Daniel Villafañe	
2023	(Colombia) Medellín	(Brazil) Yuri Guimarães	(Chile) Ignacio Varas	(Dominican Republic) Leandro Peña	
2024	(Colombia) Santa Marta	(Brazil) Caio Souza	(Colombia) Dilan Jiménez	(Chile) Josue Armijo	
2025	Panama City	(Canada) Félix Dolci	(Puerto Rico) José López	(Guatemala) Jorge Vega	
2026	(Brazil) Rio de Janeiro	(Colombia) Camilo Vera	(Chile) Josué Armijo	(Puerto Rico) José López	

== Medal table ==
Rank	Nation	Gold	Silver	Bronze	Total
1	Brazil (BRA)	6	3	3	12
2	Cuba (CUB)	5	1	0	6
3	Puerto Rico (PUR)	2	1	3	6
4	Chile (CHI)	1	3	2	6
5	Colombia (COL)	1	2	1	4
6	Mexico (MEX)	1	2	0	3
7	Guatemala (GUA)	1	1	2	4
8	Canada (CAN)	1	1	0	2
9	Dominican Republic (DOM)	1	0	1	2
9	United States (USA)	1	0	1	2
11	Venezuela (VEN)	0	1	2	3
12	Peru (PER)	0	1	0	1
13	Argentina (ARG)	0	0	2	2
14	Uruguay (URU)	0	0	1	1
Totals (14 entries)		20	16	18	54
