= Pan American Artistic Gymnastics Championships – Men's floor =

The Pan American Gymnastics Championships were first held in 1997.

Three medals are awarded: gold for first place, silver for second place, and bronze for third place.

== Medalists ==
Year	Location	Gold	Silver	Bronze	Ref
1997	(Colombia) Medellín	(United States) Jay Thornton	(Argentina) Eric Pedercini	(Puerto Rico) Lazaro Lamelas Ramirez	
2001	(Mexico) Cancún	(Brazil) Michel Conceição	(Cuba) Erick López (Cuba) Michel Brito	—N/a	
2004	(Venezuela) Maracaibo	(Brazil) Victor Rosa	(Venezuela) Fernando Fuentes	(United States) David Sender (Puerto Rico) Alexander Rodríguez	
2005	(Brazil) Rio de Janeiro	(Canada) Brandon O'Neil	(United States) Guillermo Alvarez	(Canada) Adam Wong	
2008	(Argentina) Rosario	(Peru) Mario Berrios	(Argentina) Sebastian Melchiori	(Brazil) Arthur Zanetti	
2010	(Mexico) Guadalajara	(Mexico) Santiago López	(Chile) Tomás González	(United States) Jake Dalton	
2012	(Colombia) Medellín	(Puerto Rico) Luis Rivera	(Puerto Rico) Alexander Rodríguez	(Brazil) Francisco Barretto Júnior	
2013	(Puerto Rico) San Juan	(Brazil) Diego Hypólito	(Cuba) Manrique Larduet	(Colombia) Jossimar Calvo	
2014	(Canada) Mississauga	(Chile) Tomás González	(Brazil) Diego Hypólito	(Brazil) Arthur Zanetti	
2016	(Bolivia) Sucre	(Guatemala) Jorge Vega	(Colombia) Didier Lugo	(Uruguay) Victor Rostagno	
2017	(Peru) Lima	(Guatemala) Jorge Vega	(Colombia) Andrés Martínez	(Chile) Tomás González	
2018	(Peru) Lima	(Chile) Tomás González	(Cuba) Manrique Larduet	(United States) Cameron Bock	
2021	(Brazil) Rio de Janeiro	(Ecuador) Israel Chiriboga	(Brazil) Tomás Florêncio	(Argentina) Julián Jato	
2022	(Brazil) Rio de Janeiro	(United States) Yul Moldauer	(United States) Riley Loos	(Canada) Félix Dolci	
2023	(Colombia) Medellín	(United States) Yul Moldauer	(Brazil) Yuri Guimarães	(United States) Shane Wiskus	
2024	(Colombia) Santa Marta	(Mexico) Alonso Pérez	(Colombia) Andrés Martínez	(Argentina) Julian Jato	
2025	Panama City	(United States) Jun Iwai	(Guatemala) Jorge Vega	(Cuba) Diorges Escobar	
2026	(Brazil) Rio de Janeiro	(Guatemala) Jorge Vega	(Colombia) Ángel Barajas	(Brazil) Vitaliy Guimaraes	

== Medal table ==
Rank	Nation	Gold	Silver	Bronze	Total
1	United States (USA)	4	2	4	10
2	Brazil (BRA)	3	3	4	10
3	Guatemala (GUA)	3	1	0	4
4	Chile (CHI)	2	1	1	4
5	Mexico (MEX)	2	0	0	2
6	Puerto Rico (PUR)	1	1	2	4
7	Canada (CAN)	1	0	2	3
8	Ecuador (ECU)	1	0	0	1
8	Peru (PER)	1	0	0	1
10	Colombia (COL)	0	4	1	5
10	Cuba (CUB)	0	4	1	5
12	Argentina (ARG)	0	2	2	4
13	Venezuela (VEN)	0	1	0	1
14	Uruguay (URU)	0	0	1	1
Totals (14 entries)		18	19	18	55
