= Ariana Orrego =

Peruvian artistic gymnast

- Full name: Ariana Gabriela Orrego Martínez
- Nickname: Ari
- Born: 25 September 1998 (age 27) Lima, Peru
- Height: 5 ft 1 in (155 cm)

Gymnastics career
- Discipline: Women's artistic gymnastics
- Country represented: Peru (2012–2022)
- College team: Iowa State (2018-22)
- Club: Excalibur Gymnastics
- Head coach: Gustavo Moure
- Retired: 26 July 2022
Medal record
South American Championships
Gold medal – first place	2014 Cochabamba	Team
Gold medal – first place	2014 Cochabamba	Vault
Gold medal – first place	2014 Cochabamba	Uneven bars
Gold medal – first place	2016 Lima	Vault
Gold medal – first place	2016 Lima	Uneven bars
Gold medal – first place	2019 Santiago	Balance beam
Silver medal – second place	2014 Cochabamba	All-around
Silver medal – second place	2014 Cochabamba	Balance beam
Silver medal – second place	2014 Cochabamba	Floor exercise
Silver medal – second place	2019 Santiago	All-around
Silver medal – second place	2019 Santiago	Floor exercise
Bronze medal – third place	2019 Santiago	Team

Ariana Gabriela Orrego Martínez (born 25 September 1998) is a Peruvian former artistic gymnast. She represented Peru at the 2016 and 2020 Olympic Games. She was the first ever Peruvian gymnast to compete at the Olympic Games. She is a six-time gold medalist at the South American Championships.

== Early life ==
Orrego was born on 25 September 1998 in Lima. She began gymnastics when she was six years old. She was invited by American-based coach Gustavo Moure to train at the Excalibur Gymnastics club in Virginia Beach, Virginia, and she moved to the United States alone at age 15 to train with Moure. She lived with a host family in Virginia and was homeschooled.

== Career ==
At the 2013 South American Junior Championships, Orrego tied for fourth place in the all-around and also placed fourth on the vault and uneven bars and fifth on the floor exercise. The Peruvian team also finished in fourth place behind Brazil, Argentina, and Colombia. She won a bronze medal on the balance beam behind Brazilian gymnasts Flávia Saraiva and Rebeca Andrade.

Orrego competed on the balance beam and the floor exercise at the 2014 Pacific Rim Championships but did not advance into the event finals. She then competed in the all-around at the 2014 Pan American Championships, contributing the Peruvian team's eleventh-place finish. Orrego finished thirty-first in the all-around. Then at the 2014 World Championships, she helped the Peruvian team place thirty-fourth out of the thirty-eight teams. After the World Championships, she competed at the Medellin World Challenge Cup and finished eighth on the uneven bars. Then at the 2014 South American Championships, she helped the Peruvian team win the gold medal, and Orrego won the silver medal in the all-around behind Argentine Ailen Valente. In the event finals, she won gold on the vault and uneven bars and silver on the balance beam and floor exercise.

Orrego represented Peru at the 2015 Pan American Games in Toronto and finished thirteenth in the all-around final. She then competed at the 2015 Osijek World Challenge Cup, finishing fourth on the uneven bars and sixth on the balance beam. Then at the 2015 World Championships, she finished sixty-second in the all-around during the qualification round and qualified for the 2016 Olympic Test Event, the final opportunity to qualify for the 2016 Olympic Games.

Orrego competed at the 2016 Olympic Test Event and finished forty-eighth in the all-around and qualifying for the 2016 Olympic Games. She competed at the 2016 Olympic Games in Rio de Janeiro becoming the first Peruvian gymnast to compete at the Olympic Games. She finished fiftieth in the all-around during the qualification round. After the Olympic Games, she competed at the 2016 South American Championships in Lima and won gold medals in the vault and uneven bars event finals. She also finished fourth in the all-around and sixth on the floor exercise.

While in Rio for the Olympic Games, Iowa State assistant coach Nilson Medeiros who was there coaching Venezuelan gymnast Jessica López invited Orrego to consider competing for the Iowa State gymnastics team. Orrego joined the team for the 2018 NCAA gymnastics season. During her freshman year, she competed on the floor exercise in eleven out of thirteen meets with a season-high score of 9.875 and was named to the Academic All-Big 12 Rookie Team. In May, she competed at the 2018 South American Games and finished fifth in the floor exercise event final.

During her sophomore year at Iowa State, Orrego competed in ten meets on the vault, uneven bars, and balance beam and scored a career-high 9.800 on the vault twice. Then in June, she competed at the 2019 South American Championships and helped Peru win the team bronze medal behind Argentina and Chile. She won a silver medal in the all-around behind Argentine Abigail Magistrati. In the event finals, she placed sixth on the uneven bars and won gold on the balance beam and silver on the floor exercise. She then competed at the 2019 Pan American Games hosted in her hometown, Lima. The Peruvian team placed fifth in the team competition. She also finished twentieth in the all-around final. She qualified for the balance beam final where she finished eighth. At the 2019 World Championships in Stuttgart, Orrego finished twenty-eighth in the all-around during the qualification round and qualified for the 2020 Olympic Games.

Orrego redshirted the 2020 NCAA season to prepare for the 2020 Olympic Games. After the Olympic Games were postponed, she returned to Iowa State for the 2021 season and competed in four meets on the balance beam and in two meets on the floor exercise. At the 2020 Olympic Games in Tokyo, Orrego finished seventy-fourth in the all-around during the qualification round. She returned to Iowa State for her senior season in 2022. She competed in all thirteen meets on vault, uneven bars, and floor exercise. She scored a career-high 9.925 on the uneven bars at a quad meet hosted by Northern Illinois University. She ended her NCAA career by scoring a career-high 9.900 on the floor exercise in the NCAA Regionals Second Round.

Orrego announced her retirement from gymnastics on 26 July 2022 on Instagram.

== Personal life ==
Orrego graduated from Iowa State University in May 2022 with a degree in management information systems.

== Competitive history ==
Year	Event	Team	AA	VT	UB	BB	FX
Junior
2013	South American Junior Championships	4	4	4	4	3rd place, bronze medalist(s)	5
Senior
2014
2014	Pan American Championships	11	31				
2014	World Championships	34					
2014	South American Championships	1st place, gold medalist(s)	2nd place, silver medalist(s)	1st place, gold medalist(s)	1st place, gold medalist(s)	2nd place, silver medalist(s)	2nd place, silver medalist(s)
2015
2015	Pan American Games		13				
2015	Osijek World Challenge Cup				4	6	
2015	World Championships		62				
2016	Olympic Test Event		48				
2016	Olympic Games		50				
2016	South American Championships		4	1st place, gold medalist(s)	1st place, gold medalist(s)		6
2018	South American Games						5
2019	South American Championships	3rd place, bronze medalist(s)	2nd place, silver medalist(s)		6	1st place, gold medalist(s)	2nd place, silver medalist(s)
2019	Pan American Games	5	20			8	
2019	World Championships		28				
2021
2021	Olympic Games		74				
