= 2014 South American Artistic Gymnastics Championships =

International artistic gymnastics competition

The 2014 South American Artistic Gymnastics Championships were held in Cochabamba, Bolivia December 9–15, 2014. The competition was organized by the Bolivian Gymnastics Federation and approved by the International Gymnastics Federation. This was the 13th edition of the South American Artistic Gymnastics Championships for senior gymnasts.

== Participating nations ==
- Argentina
- Bolivia
- Brazil
- Colombia
- Ecuador
- Peru
- Uruguay

== Medalists ==
Event	Gold	Silver	Bronze
Men
Team all-around	Brazil; Hudson Miguel; Renato Oliveira; Ângelo Assumpção; Pericles Silva; Henrique Flores; Fellipe Arakawa	Argentina; Andres Arean; Brian Francioni; Franco Gutierrez; Federico Molinari; Mauro Gutierrez	Peru; Mauricio Gallegos; Jose Quilla; Mario Berrios; Arian Leon; Renato Deza; Diego Lujan
Individual all-around	Henrique Flores (BRA)	Ângelo Assumpção (BRA)	Mauricio Gallegos (PER)
Floor	Ângelo Assumpção (BRA)	Renato Oliveira (BRA)	Andres Arean (ARG)
Pommel horse	Henrique Flores (BRA)	Pericles Silva (BRA)	Jose Quilla (PER)
Rings	Henrique Flores (BRA)	Federico Molinari (ARG)	Pericles Silva (BRA)
Vault	Ângelo Assumpção (BRA)	Christian Meneses (URU)	Hudson Miguel (BRA)
Parallel bars	Pericles Silva (BRA)	Federico Molinari (ARG)	Fellipe Arakawa (BRA)
Horizontal bar	Henrique Flores (BRA)	Daniel Gomez (ECU)	Mauricio Gallegos (PER)
Women
Team all-around	Peru; Ariana Orrego; Mariana Chiarella; Andrea Camino; Paula Bautista; Joaquina Gallegos	Ecuador; María Cajilema; Britany Peña; Katherine Alvarado	Bolivia; Dianne Soria; Adriana España; Gisel Conde
Individual all-around	Ailen Valente (ARG)	Ariana Orrego (PER)	Mariana Chiarella (PER)
Vault	Ariana Orrego (PER)	Andrea Camino (PER)	Dianne Soria (BOL)
Uneven bars	Ariana Orrego (PER)	Ailen Valente (ARG)	Mariana Chiarella (PER)
Balance beam	Mariana Chiarella (PER)	Ariana Orrego (PER)	Ailen Valente (ARG)
Floor	Mariana Chiarella (PER)	Ariana Orrego (PER)	Ailen Valente (ARG)

== Medal table ==
Rank	Nation	Gold	Silver	Bronze	Total
1	Brazil (BRA)	8	3	3	14
2	Peru (PER)	5	4	6	15
3	Argentina (ARG)	1	4	3	8
4	Ecuador (ECU)	0	2	0	2
5	Uruguay (URU)	0	1	0	1
6	Bolivia (BOL)	0	0	2	2
Totals (6 entries)		14	14	14	42
