= Gymnastics at the 2019 Pan American Games – Women's artistic team all-around =

Women's artistic team all-around at the 2019 Pan American Games
- Venue: Polideportivo Villa el Salvador
- Dates: July 27
- Competitors: 60 from 19 nations
- Winning score: 171.000

Medalists
Gold medal	Kara Eaker; Aleah Finnegan; Morgan Hurd; Riley McCusker; Leanne Wong	United States
Silver medal	Ellie Black; Brooklyn Moors; Shallon Olsen; Isabela Onyshko; Victoria-Kayen Woo	Canada
Bronze medal	Jade Barbosa; Thais Fidelis; Lorrane Oliveira; Carolyne Pedro; Flávia Saraiva	Brazil

The women's artistic team final at the 2019 Pan American Games was held on July 27 at the Polideportivo Villa el Salvador in Lima, Peru. This event also served as the qualification for the all-around and event finals.

== Schedule ==
All times are Peru Time (UTC-5).

Date	Time	Round
July 27	15:00	Subdivision 1
July 27	17:20	Subdivision 2
July 27	20:30	Subdivision 3

== Results ==
=== Team ===
Oldest and youngest competitors

	Name	Country	Date of birth	Age
Youngest	Abigail Magistrati	Argentina	December 29, 2003	15 years, 6 months and 28 days
Oldest	Makarena Pinto	Chile	August 15, 1988	30 years, 11 months and 12 days

Rank	Team	Vault (gymnastics)	Uneven bars	Balance beam	Floor (gymnastics)	Total
1st place, gold medalist(s)	United States	43.200 (1)	43.400 (1)	42.750 (1)	41.650 (1)	171.000
1st place, gold medalist(s)	Kara Eaker	14.200	13.800	14.850	13.850	171.000
1st place, gold medalist(s)	Aleah Finnegan	14.700			13.750	171.000
1st place, gold medalist(s)	Morgan Hurd	14.300	14.250	13.100	13.300	171.000
1st place, gold medalist(s)	Riley McCusker	13.850	14.900	14.250	14.050	171.000
1st place, gold medalist(s)	Leanne Wong		14.250	13.650		171.000
2nd place, silver medalist(s)	Canada	42.250 (2)	40.100 (2)	38.100 (2)	40.150 (2)	160.600
2nd place, silver medalist(s)	Ellie Black	14.550	14.050	12.950	13.550	160.600
2nd place, silver medalist(s)	Brooklyn Moors	12.500	13.100	11.950	13.500	160.600
2nd place, silver medalist(s)	Shallon Olsen	14.150			12.600	160.600
2nd place, silver medalist(s)	Isabela Onyshko		12.950	12.550		160.600
2nd place, silver medalist(s)	Victoria-Kayen Woo	13.550	12.600	12.600	13.100	160.600
3rd place, bronze medalist(s)	Brazil	41.500 (4)	40.100 (2)	37.050 (4)	39.900 (3)	158.550
3rd place, bronze medalist(s)	Jade Barbosa					158.550
3rd place, bronze medalist(s)	Thais Fidelis	13.550	12.950	12.200	13.300	158.550
3rd place, bronze medalist(s)	Lorrane Oliveira		14.000			158.550
3rd place, bronze medalist(s)	Carolyne Pedro	13.450	13.150	11.950	12.800	158.550
3rd place, bronze medalist(s)	Flávia Saraiva	14.500	12.800	12.900	13.800	158.550
4	Argentina	39.250 (8)	38.800 (4)	36.425 (5)	38.950 (4)	153.425
4	Martina Dominici	14.600	13.350	11.700	13.200	153.425
4	Luna Fernandez	11.650	12.300	11.750	11.800	153.425
4	Abigail Magistrati	0.000	13.000	11.950	13.100	153.425
4	Valeria Pereyra		12.450			153.425
4	Agustina Pisos	13.000		12.725	12.650	153.425
5	Peru	40.700 (6)	35.775 (8)	37.400 (3)	38.650 (6)	150.525
5	Sandra Collantes	13.700	12.575	11.700	12.550	150.525
5	Fabiola Diaz	13.300	10.500	12.950	11.250	150.525
5	Venere Horna	DNS		10.600	DNS	150.525
5	Ariana Orrego	13.700	12.000	12.750	12.850	150.525
5	Valentina Sarango		11.200			150.525
6	Cuba	42.200 (3)	36.450 (6)	34.800 (8)	36.850 (5)	150.300
6	Yesenia Ferrera	14.500	11.500	11.650	12.050	150.300
6	Vanessa Leliebre			10.150		150.300
6	Mary Morffi		12.050	11.950	12.000	150.300
6	Yumila Rodríguez	13.500	11.700		10.700	150.300
6	Marcia Vidiaux	14.200	12.700	11.200	12.800	150.300
7	Mexico	38.900 (9)	37.325 (5)	35.600 (6)	35.300 (9)	147.025
7	Daniela Briceño	11.800	12.700	10.500	10.300	147.025
7	Paulina Campos	12.500	11.650	12.250	11.650	147.025
7	Nicolle Castro					147.025
7	Anapaula Gutierrez	13.750	12.375	11.900	11.950	147.025
7	Jimena Gutierrez	12.650	12.250	11.350	11.700	147.025
8	Chile	40.850 (5)	35.900 (7)	33.250 (10)	35.500 (8)	145.500
8	Simona Castro	13.300	12.200	10.700	12.050	145.500
8	María del Mar Pérez		11.750	11.750		145.500
8	María del Sol Pérez	11.950	11.950	10.800	11.350	145.500
8	Makarena Pinto	13.500			11.150	145.500
8	Franchesca Santi	14.050	10.650	8.350	12.100	145.500

=== Qualification ===
==== Individual all-around ====
Rank	Gymnast	Vault (gymnastics)	Uneven bars	Balance beam	Floor (gymnastics)	Total	Qual.
1	Riley McCusker (USA)	13.850	14.900	14.250	14.050	57.050	Q
2	Kara Eaker (USA)	14.200	13.800	14.850	13.850	56.700	Q
3	Ellie Black (CAN)	14.550	14.050	12.950	13.550	55.100	Q
4	Morgan Hurd (USA)	14.300	14.250	13.100	13.300	54.950	–
5	Flávia Saraiva (BRA)	14.500	12.800	12.900	13.800	54.000	Q
6	Martina Dominici (ARG)	14.600	13.350	11.700	13.200	52.850	Q
7	Thais Fidelis (BRA)	13.550	12.950	12.200	13.300	52.000	Q
8	Danusia Francis (JAM)	13.350	12.875	12.950	12.800	51.975	Q
9	Victoria-Kayen Woo (CAN)	13.550	12.600	12.600	13.100	51.850	Q
10	Carolyne Pedro (BRA)	13.450	13.150	11.950	12.800	51.350	–
11	Ariana Orrego (PER)	13.700	12.000	12.750	12.850	51.300	Q
12	Brooklyn Moors (CAN)	12.500	13.100	11.950	13.500	51.050	–
13	Marcia Vidiaux (CUB)	14.200	12.700	11.200	12.800	50.900	Q
14	Sandra Collantes (PER)	13.700	12.575	11.700	12.550	50.525	Q
15	Ana Palacios (GUA)	14.200	11.350	11.500	12.950	50.000	Q
16	Anapaula Gutierrez (MEX)	13.750	12.375	11.900	11.950	49.975	Q
17	Yesenia Ferrera (CUB)	14.500	11.500	11.650	12.050	49.700	Q
18	Karelys Diaz (PUR)	13.050	11.500	12.350	12.100	49.000	Q
19	Luciana Alvarado (CRC)	13.350	11.350	12.150	11.950	48.800	Q
20	Simona Castro (CHI)	13.300	12.200	10.700	12.050	48.250	Q
21	Paulina Campos (MEX)	12.500	11.650	12.250	11.650	48.050	Q
22	Fabiola Diaz (PER)	13.300	10.500	12.950	11.250	48.000	–
23	Jimena Gutierrez (MEX)	12.650	12.250	11.350	11.700	47.950	–
24	Andrea Maldonado (PUR)	13.300	12.050	10.200	12.200	47.750	Q
25	Luna Fernandez (ARG)	11.650	12.300	11.750	11.800	47.500	Q
26	Heika Salas (CRC)	11.750	12.700	10.900	11.850	47.200	Q
27	Paola Ruano (ESA)	12.400	11.025	11.800	11.350	46.575	Q
28	Katriel de Sousa (VEN)	13.250	10.250	10.950	11.850	46.300	Q
29	María del Sol Pérez (CHI)	11.950	11.950	10.800	11.350	46.050	Q
30	Daniela Briceño (MEX)	11.800	12.700	10.500	10.300	45.300	–
31	Franchesca Santi (CHI)	14.050	10.650	8.350	12.100	45.150	–
32	Pierina Cedres (URU)	12.150	10.700	10.700	11.200	44.750	R1
33	Kiara Richmon (JAM)	12.600	11.400	9.950	10.650	44.600	R2
34	Paula Mejias (PUR)	13.700	10.400	9.300	11.000	44.400	–
35	Diana Vasquez (BOL)	13.200	9.350	10.750	10.950	44.250	R3
36	Angie Rodriguez (COL)	12.700	9.800	10.575	10.900	43.975	R4
37	María Arauz (BOL)	13.100	9.750	9.550	8.850	41.250	–
38	Raegan Rutty (CAY)	12.075	9.600	9.400	9.900	40.975	–
39	Abigail Magistrati (ARG)	0.000	13.000	11.950	13.100	38.050	–
40	Alondra Echavarria (DOM)	0.000	8.025	8.650	10.050	26.725	–

==== Vault ====
Rank	Gymnast	Vault 1				Vault 2				Total	Qual.
Rank	Gymnast	D Score	E Score	Pen.	Score 1	D Score	E Score	Pen.	Score 2	Total	Qual.
1	Ellie Black (CAN)	5.400	9.150		14.550	5.200	9.100		14.300	14.425	Q
2	Yesenia Ferrera (CUB)	5.400	9.100		14.500	5.200	8.750	0.100	13.850	14.175	Q
3	Martina Dominici (ARG)	5.400	9.200		14.600	4.800	8.900		13.700	14.150	Q
4	Aleah Finnegan (USA)	5.400	9.300		14.700	4.400	9.150		13.550	14.125	Q
5	Shallon Olsen (CAN)	5.400	8.750		14.150	5.200	8.550		13.750	13.950	Q
6	Ana Palacios (GUA)	5.400	9.100	0.300	14.200	5.200	8.750	0.300	13.650	13.925	Q
7	Franchesca Santi (CHI)	5.400	8.650		14.050	4.800	8.800		13.600	13.825	Q
8	Makarena Pinto (CHI)	4.800	8.700		13.500	5.200	8.650		13.850	13.675	Q
9	Marcia Vidiaux (CUB)	5.600	8.700	0.100	14.200	5.800	7.600	0.300	13.100	13.650	R1
10	Yamilet Peña (DOM)	5.400	8.500		13.900	5.400	7.950		13.350	13.625	R2
11	Paula Mejias (PUR)	4.800	8.900		13.700	4.800	8.200		13.000	13.350	R3

==== Uneven bars ====
Rank	Gymnast	D Score	E Score	Pen.	Total	Qual.
1	Riley McCusker (USA)	6.100	8.800		14.900	Q
2	Leanne Wong (USA)	5.900	8.350		14.250	Q
3	Morgan Hurd (USA)	6.000	8.250		14.250	–
4	Ellie Black (CAN)	5.900	8.150		14.050	Q
5	Lorrane Oliveira (BRA)	5.600	8.400		14.000	Q
6	Kara Eaker (USA)	5.500	8.300		13.800	–
7	Martina Dominici (ARG)	4.900	8.450		13.350	Q
8	Carolyne Pedro (BRA)	5.100	8.050		13.150	Q
9	Brooklyn Moors (CAN)	5.000	8.100		13.100	Q
10	Abigail Magistrati (ARG)	5.000	8.000		13.000	Q
11	Thais Fidelis (BRA)	5.000	7.950		12.950	–
12	Isabela Onyshko (CAN)	5.600	7.350		12.950	–
13	Danusia Francis (JAM)	5.100	7.775		12.875	R1
14	Flávia Saraiva (BRA)	5.200	7.600		12.800	–
15	Marcia Vidiaux (CUB)	4.500	8.200		12.700	R2
16	Daniela Briceño (MEX)	4.700	8.000		12.700	R3

==== Balance beam ====
Rank	Gymnast	D Score	E Score	Pen.	Total	Qual.
1	Kara Eaker (USA)	6.400	8.450		14.850	Q
2	Riley McCusker (USA)	5.900	8.350		14.250	Q
3	Leanne Wong (USA)	5.500	8.150		13.650	–
4	Morgan Hurd (USA)	5.300	7.800		13.100	–
5	Danusia Francis (JAM)	5.000	7.950		12.950	Q
6	Fabiola Diaz (PER)	5.100	7.850		12.950	Q
7	Ellie Black (CAN)	5.600	7.350		12.950	Q
8	Flávia Saraiva (BRA)	5.500	7.400		12.900	Q
9	Ariana Orrego (PER)	5.000	7.750		12.750	Q
10	Agustina Pisos (ARG)	4.900	7.825		12.725	Q
11	Victoria-Kayen Woo (CAN)	5.000	7.600		12.600	R1
12	Isabela Onyshko (CAN)	5.000	7.550		12.550	–
13	Bianca Leon (PUR)	4.800	7.650		12.450	R2
14	Karelys Diaz (PUR)	4.800	7.550		12.350	R3

==== Floor ====
Rank	Gymnast	D Score	E Score	Pen.	Total	Qual.
1	Riley McCusker (USA)	5.400	8.650		14.050	Q
2	Kara Eaker (USA)	5.400	8.450		13.850	Q
3	Flávia Saraiva (BRA)	5.300	8.500		13.800	Q
4	Aleah Finnegan (USA)	5.500	8.250		13.750	–
5	Ellie Black (CAN)	5.400	8.150		13.550	Q
6	Brooklyn Moors (CAN)	5.100	8.400		13.500	Q
7	Thais Fidelis (BRA)	5.100	8.300	0.100	13.300	Q
8	Morgan Hurd (USA)	5.200	8.100		13.300	–
9	Martina Dominici (ARG)	4.900	8.300		13.200	Q
10	Abigail Magistrati (ARG)	4.900	8.200		13.100	Q
11	Victoria-Kayen Woo (CAN)	5.000	8.100		13.100	–
12	Ana Palacios (GUA)	5.000	7.950		12.950	R1
13	Ariana Orrego (PER)	4.700	8.150		12.850	R2
14	Marcia Vidiaux (CUB)	5.100	7.800	0.100	12.800	R3
