= Gymnastics at the 2023 Pan American Games – Men's rings =

Men's rings at the 2023 Pan American Games
- Venue: Training Center for Collective Sport
- Dates: October 24
- Competitors: 8 from 6 nations
- Winning score: 14.200

Medalists
Gold medal	Donnell Whittenburg	United States
Silver medal	Daniel Villafañe	Argentina
Bronze medal	Félix Dolci	Canada

The men's rings gymnastic event at the 2023 Pan American Games was held on October 24 at the Training Center for Collective Sport.

== Results ==
=== Final ===
Rank	Gymnast	D Score	E Score	Pen.	Total
1st place, gold medalist(s)	Donnell Whittenburg (USA)	6.0	8.200		14.200
2nd place, silver medalist(s)	Daniel Villafañe (ARG)	6.0	8.133		14.133
3rd place, bronze medalist(s)	Félix Dolci (CAN)	5.4	8.400		13.800
4	Colt Walker (USA)	5.4	8.266		13.666
5	Kristopher Bohórquez (COL)	5.6	8.066		13.666
6	René Cournoyer (CAN)	5.4	8.233		13.633
7	Alejandro de la Cruz (CUB)	5.9	7.433		13.333
8	Fabián de Luna (MEX)	5.6	7.666		13.266

=== Qualification ===
Rank	Gymnast	D Score	E Score	Pen.	Total	Qual.
1	(United States) Donnell Whittenburg	6.000	8.433		14.433	Q
2	(Argentina) Daniel Villafañe	6.000	8.200		14.200	Q
3	(Canada) Félix Dolci	5.400	8.400		13.800	Q
3	(Canada) René Cournoyer	5.400	8.400		13.800	Q
5	(Canada) William Émard	5.500	8.166		13.666	–
6	(Colombia) Kristopher Bohórquez	5.600	8.066		13.666	Q
7	(United States) Colt Walker	5.400	8.233		13.633	Q
8	(United States) Cameron Bock	5.200	8.400		13.600	–
9	(Cuba) Alejandro de la Cruz	5.500	8.100		13.600	Q
10	(Mexico) Fabián de Luna	5.600	7.833		13.433	Q
11	(Chile) Joel Álvarez	4.900	8.266		13.166	R1
12	(Ecuador) César López	4.700	8.400		13.100	R2
13	(Brazil) Diogo Soares	4.400	8.633		13.033	R3
