= Gymnastics at the 2018 South American Games =

- Venue: Pabellón Municipal de Gimnasia G.A.M.C.
- Location: (Bolivia) Cochabamba
- Dates: 27 May – 8 June
- Nations: 9

Gymnastics events were competed at the 2018 South American Games in Cochabamba, Bolivia, from May 26 to June 8, 2018.

== Participating nations ==
- Argentina
- Bolivia
- Brazil
- Chile
- Colombia
- Ecuador
- Peru
- Uruguay
- Venezuela

== Medal summary ==
=== Artistic gymnastics ===
Event	Gold	Silver	Bronze
Men
Team all-around	Brazil; Arthur Zanetti; Caio Souza; Francisco Barreto; Leonardo Souza; Luís Porto; Péricles Silva	Colombia; Álvaro Calero; Andrés Martínez; Carlos Calvo; Dilan Jiménez; Javier Sandoval; Jossimar Calvo	Argentina; Daniel Villafañe; Federico Molinari; Julian Jato; Nicolas Cordoba; Osvaldo Martinez; Santiago Mayol
Individual all-around	Jossimar Calvo; Colombia	Caio Souza; Brazil	Francisco Barreto; Brazil
Floor exercise	Tomás González; Chile	Andrés Martínez; Colombia	Julian Jato; Argentina
Pommel horse	Francisco Barreto; Brazil	Péricles Silva; Brazil	Javier Sandoval; Colombia
Rings	Arthur Zanetti; Brazil	Federico Molinari; Argentina	Caio Souza; Brazil
Vault	Arthur Zanetti; Brazil	Victor Rostagno; Uruguay	Daniel Agüero; Peru
Parallel bars	Jossimar Calvo; Colombia	Caio Souza; Brazil	Javier Sandoval; Colombia
Horizontal bar	Caio Souza; Brazil	Javier Sandoval; Colombia	Francisco Barreto; Brazil
Women
Team all-around	Brazil; Anna Júlia Reis; Carolyne Pedro; Flávia Saraiva; Jade Barbosa; Luisa Trautwein; Thais Fidelis	Argentina; Agustina Pisos; Ayelén Tarabini; Camila Bonzo; Martina Dominici; Mayra Vaquie; Romina Pietrantuono	Colombia; Dayana Ardila; Ginna Escobar; Mayerly Vera; Valentina Pardo; Yurany Avendaño
Individual all-around	Martina Dominici; Argentina	Flávia Saraiva; Brazil	Jade Barbosa; Brazil
Vault	Luisa Trautwein; Brazil	Mayra Vaquie; Argentina	Martina Dominici; Argentina
Uneven bars	Flávia Saraiva; Brazil	Jade Barbosa; Brazil	Martina Dominici; Argentina
Balance beam	Flávia Saraiva; Brazil	Jade Barbosa; Brazil	Martina Dominici; Argentina
Floor exercise	Thais Fidelis; Brazil	Anna Júlia Reis; Brazil	Martina Dominici; Argentina

=== Rhythmic gymnastics ===
Event	Gold	Silver	Bronze
Individual all-around	Natália Gaudio; Brazil	Barbara Domingos; Brazil	Lina Dussan; Colombia
Hoop	Natália Gaudio; Brazil	Barbara Domingos; Brazil	Lina Dussan; Colombia
Ball	Barbara Domingos; Brazil	Lina Dussan; Colombia	Oriana Viñas; Colombia
Clubs	Natália Gaudio; Brazil	Grisbel Lopez; Venezuela	Lina Dussan; Colombia
Ribbon	Natália Gaudio; Brazil	Barbara Domingos; Brazil	Grisbel Lopez; Venezuela
Group all-around	Brazil; Alanis Avila; Deborah Medrado; Gabriela Ribeiro; Gabrielle Silva; Jessica Maier; Nicole Pircio	Venezuela; Dahilin Parra; Juliette Quiroz; Kizzy Rivas; Maria Ojeda; Sofia Suarez	Argentina; Ana Arrascaeta; Giuliana Casini; Maria Reyna; Paula Londero; Virginia Lopez
Group 5 hoops	Brazil; Alanis Avila; Deborah Medrado; Gabriela Ribeiro; Gabrielle Silva; Jessica Maier; Nicole Pircio	Venezuela; Dahilin Parra; Juliette Quiroz; Kizzy Rivas; Maria Ojeda; Sofia Suarez	Chile; Catalina Araya; Isidora Vergara; Javiera Aravena; Maria Ignacia León; Valentina Cuello
Group 3 balls and 2 ropes	Brazil; Alanis Avila; Deborah Medrado; Gabriela Ribeiro; Gabrielle Silva; Jessica Maier; Nicole Pircio	Venezuela; Dahilin Parra; Juliette Quiroz; Kizzy Rivas; Maria Ojeda; Sofia Suarez	Argentina; Ana Arrascaeta; Giuliana Casini; Maria Reyna; Paula Londero; Virginia Lopez

=== Trampoline ===
Event	Gold	Silver	Bronze
Men's individual	Ángel Hernández; Colombia	Federico Cury; Argentina	Santiago Marcano; Venezuela
Women's individual	Camilla Gomes; Brazil	Katish Hernández; Colombia	Mara Colombo; Argentina

== Medal table ==
Rank	Nation	Gold	Silver	Bronze	Total
1	Brazil (BRA)	19	10	4	33
2	Colombia (COL)	3	5	7	15
3	Argentina (ARG)	1	4	9	14
4	Chile (CHI)	1	0	1	2
5	Venezuela (VEN)	0	4	2	6
6	Uruguay (URU)	0	1	0	1
7	Peru (PER)	0	0	1	1
Totals (7 entries)		24	24	24	72
