= Daniel Villafañe =

Argentine gymnast

- Full name: Daniel Ángel Villafañe
- Born: July 6, 1993 (age 33) Buenos Aires, Argentina

Gymnastics career
- Discipline: Men's artistic gymnastics
- Country represented: Argentina; (2015–present)
- Club: Club de Gimnasia y Esgrima
Medal record
Men's artistic gymnastics
Representing Argentina
Pan American Games
| Silver medal – second place | 2023 Santiago | Rings |
Pan American Championships
| Gold medal – first place | 2023 Medellín | Rings |
| Gold medal – first place | 2025 Panama City | Rings |
| Silver medal – second place | 2024 Santa Marta | Rings |
| Bronze medal – third place | 2016 Sucre | Rings |
| Bronze medal – third place | 2018 Lima | Rings |
| Bronze medal – third place | 2021 Rio de Janeiro | Vault |
| Bronze medal – third place | 2022 Rio de Janeiro | Vault |
| Bronze medal – third place | 2024 Santa Marta | Team |
| Bronze medal – third place | 2025 Panama City | Team |
South American Games
| Gold medal – first place | 2022 Asunción | Rings |
| Silver medal – second place | 2022 Asunción | Team |
| Silver medal – second place | 2022 Asunción | Vault |
| Bronze medal – third place | 2018 Cochabamba | Team |
| Bronze medal – third place | 2026 Santa Fe | Team |
| Bronze medal – third place | 2026 Santa Fe | Rings |
South American Championships
| Gold medal – first place | 2021 San Juan | Rings |
| Gold medal – first place | 2022 Lima | Rings |
| Gold medal – first place | 2024 Aracaju | Rings |
| Silver medal – second place | 2015 Cali | Rings |
| Silver medal – second place | 2016 Lima | Team |
| Silver medal – second place | 2016 Lima | All-around |
| Silver medal – second place | 2017 Cochabamba | Team |
| Silver medal – second place | 2021 San Juan | Team |
| Silver medal – second place | 2022 Lima | Team |
| Silver medal – second place | 2024 Aracaju | Team |
| Bronze medal – third place | 2017 Cochabamba | Rings |
| Bronze medal – third place | 2017 Cochabamba | Vault |
| Bronze medal – third place | 2024 Aracaju | Vault |

Daniel Ángel Villafañe (born July 6, 1993) is an Argentine artistic gymnast. He is a two-time Pan American Champion as well as the 2023 Pan American Games silver medalist on rings.

== Early life ==
Villafañe was born in Buenos Aires in 1993. He began training gymnastics when he was seven years old. In addition to training gymnastics full time, Villafañe also works as a teacher at Club Comunicaciones.

== Gymnastics career ==
=== 2022–2024 ===
Villafañe competed at the 2022 Pan American Championships where he won bronze on vault behind Caio Souza and Félix Dolci. The following month he competed at the South American Championships where he won gold on rings.

Villafañe competed at the 2023 Pan American Championships where he won his first Pan American title on rings. Villafañe won a bronze medal on rings at the 2023 Szombathely World Challenge Cup. In late November Villafañe competed at the 2023 Pan American Games where he won silver on rings behind Donnell Whittenburg.

At the 2024 Pan American Championships Villafañe won silver on rings. Later that year he competed at the South American Championships where he won gold on rings.

=== 2025 ===
Villafañe began the 2025 season competing at the Varna World Challenge Cup where he won bronze on rings behind Adem Asil and Nguyễn Văn Khánh Phong. In June he competed at the 2025 Pan American Championships where he won his second Pan American title on rings. Additionally he helped Argentina win bronze in the team final. Villafañe competed at the World Challenge Cups in Paris and Szombathely, placing sixth on rings at the former and winning silver at the latter behind Mehmet Ayberk Koşak. His results throughout the 2025 World Challenge Cup series led him to win the series title on rings.

== Competitive history ==
Competitive history of Daniel Villafañe
| Year | Event | Team | AA | FX | PH | SR | VT | PB | HB |
|---|---|---|---|---|---|---|---|---|---|
| 2015 | South American Championships | 3rd place, bronze medalist(s) | | | | 2nd place, silver medalist(s) | | | |
2016
| 2016 | Pan American Championships | | | | | 1st place, gold medalist(s) | | | |
| 2016 | South American Championships | 2nd place, silver medalist(s) | 2nd place, silver medalist(s) | | | | | | |
| 2017 | South American Championships | 2nd place, silver medalist(s) | 6 | | | 4 | 3rd place, bronze medalist(s) | | |
| 2017 | World Championships | | 38 | | | | | | |
| 2018 | South American Games | 3rd place, bronze medalist(s) | 22 | | | 4 | 7 | 6 | |
| 2018 | Pan American Championships | 6 | 15 | | | | | | |
| 2018 | World Championships | | | | | 50 | | | |
2019
| 2019 | Pan American Games | 8 | 17 | | | 7 | | | |
| 2019 | World Championships | | | | | 63 | 21 | | |
2021
| 2021 | Pan American Championships | 4 | 16 | | | 5 | 3rd place, bronze medalist(s) | | |
| 2021 | South American Championships | 2nd place, silver medalist(s) | 10 | | | 1st place, gold medalist(s) | 5 | | |
2022
| 2022 | Pan American Championships | 6 | | | | 8 | 3rd place, bronze medalist(s) | | |
| 2022 | South American Championships | 2nd place, silver medalist(s) | 7 | | | 1st place, gold medalist(s) | 6 | | |
| 2022 | South American Games | 2nd place, silver medalist(s) | | | | 1st place, gold medalist(s) | 2nd place, silver medalist(s) | | |
2023
| 2023 | Pan American Championships | 5 | | | | 1st place, gold medalist(s) | | | |
| 2023 | Szombathely World Challenge Cup | | | | | 3rd place, bronze medalist(s) | 7 | | |
| 2023 | Paris World Challenge Cup | | | | | 6 | | | |
| 2023 | Pan American Games | 4 | | | | 2nd place, silver medalist(s) | 5 | | |
| 2024 | Cairo World Cup | | | | | 7 | | | |
| 2024 | Pan American Championships | 3rd place, bronze medalist(s) | | | | 2nd place, silver medalist(s) | 6 | | |
| 2024 | South American Championships | 2nd place, silver medalist(s) | | | | 1st place, gold medalist(s) | 4 | | |
| 2025 | Varna World Challenge Cup | | | | | 3rd place, bronze medalist(s) | 4 | | |
| 2025 | Koper World Challenge Cup | | | | | | 5 | | |
| 2025 | Pan American Championships | 3rd place, bronze medalist(s) | | | | 1st place, gold medalist(s) | | | |
| 2025 | Paris World Challenge Cup | | | | | 6 | | | |
| 2025 | Szombathely World Challenge Cup | | | | | 2nd place, silver medalist(s) | 5 | | |
| 2026 | Cottbus World Cup | | | | | 6 | | | |
| 2026 | Baku World Cup | | | | | 8 | | | |
| 2026 | Antalya World Cup | | | | | 5 | | | |
| 2026 | Pan American Championships | 6 | | | | 6 | | | |
| 2026 | South American Games | 3rd place, bronze medalist(s) | | | | 3rd place, bronze medalist(s) | 6 | | |
