= Thaís Fidélis =

Brazilian artistic gymnast

Thais Fidelis
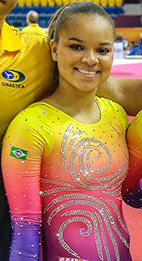
- Fidélis at the 2018 World Championships

Personal information
- Full name: Thaís Fidélis dos Santos
- Born: July 23, 2001 (age 25) Ribeirão Preto
- Height: 1.50 m (4 ft 11 in)

Gymnastics career
- Discipline: Women's artistic gymnastics
- Country represented: Brazil; (2016–present)
- Club: SESI São Paulo
- Head coach: Felipe Nayme
- Former coaches: Irina Ilyashenko, Oleg Ostapenko, Roger Medina
Medal record
Representing Brazil
Women's artistic gymnastics
Event	1st	2nd	3rd
FIG All-Around World Cup	0	0	1
FIG World Challenge Cup	3	0	2
Total	3	0	3
Pan American Games
Bronze medal – third place	2019 Lima	Team
Pan American Championships
Silver medal – second place	2018 Lima	Team
Silver medal – second place	2026 Rio de Janeiro	Team
Bronze medal – third place	2025 Panama City	Team
Bronze medal – third place	2026 Rio de Janeiro	All-around
Bronze medal – third place	2026 Rio de Janeiro	Balance beam
South American Games
Gold medal – first place	2018 Cochabamba	Team
Gold medal – first place	2018 Cochabamba	Floor exercise
Gold medal – first place	2022 Asunción	Team
Silver medal – second place	2026 Santa Fe	Team
South American Championships
Gold medal – first place	2022 Lima	Team
Gold medal – first place	2022 Lima	Uneven bars
Gold medal – first place	2025 Medellín	Team
Silver medal – second place	2025 Medellín	Balance beam

Thaís Fidélis dos Santos (born July 23, 2001) is a Brazilian artistic gymnast. She represented Brazil at the 2017 Artistic Gymnastics World Championships in Montreal, Quebec, Canada, where she placed fourth on the floor exercise.

== Junior career ==
=== 2016 ===
In September, Thais Fidelis represented Brazil at the 2016 Pan American Individual Event Artistic Gymnastics Championships. She earned three medals: two silver medals (all-around and balance beam), and one gold medal (vault).

== Senior career ==
=== 2017 ===
In March, Thais represented Brazil at the City of Jesolo Trophy where she earned a silver medal with the Brazilian team, behind the United States and ahead of Russia.

In May, Fidelis took part at the Koper World Challenge Cup, where she earned the bronze medal on the balance beam. That same month, she took two gold medals, on balance beam and floor exercise, at the Osijek World Challenge Cup. In September, Thais competed at the Varna Challenge Cup where she earned gold on the floor exercise and bronze on the uneven bars.

At the 2017 World Artistic Gymnastics Championships, in October, Thais became the first female Brazilian gymnast to qualify for the floor final since Daiane dos Santos in 2006. Fidelis placed fourth, the best international result from a female gymnast from Brazil at the World Championships since Jade Barbosa's fourth place on vault in 2011. She also qualified for the all-around final, where she finished 24th.

=== 2018 ===
In May, Thais Fidelis competed at the South American Games. She won the gold medal with the Brazilian team, and also earned an individual gold medal on the floor exercise.

In September, Filedis competed at the Pan American Championships where she earned the silver medal with the Brazilian team. At the World Championships she helped the Brazilian team qualify for the team final for the first time in eleven years, finishing seventh overall.

=== 2019 ===
Fidelis became the first female Brazilian gymnast to earn a medal in the all-around at the World Cup series, a bronze medal at the Birmingham World Cup in March.
