= 2016 South American Artistic Gymnastics Championships =

International artistic gymnastics competition

The 2016 South American Artistic Gymnastics Championships were held in Lima, Peru November 18–20, 2016. The competition was organized by the Peruvian Gymnastics Federation and approved by the International Gymnastics Federation. This was the 15th edition of the South American Artistic Gymnastics Championships for senior gymnasts.

== Participating nations ==
- Argentina
- Bolivia
- Chile
- Colombia
- Ecuador
- Panama
- Peru
- Uruguay
- Venezuela

== Medalists ==
Event	Gold	Silver	Bronze
Men
Team all-around	Colombia; Didier Lugo; Kristopher Bohórquez; Juan Camilo Sánchez; Dilan Jiménez; William Calle	Argentina; Daniel Villafañe; Andres Arean; Federico Molinari; Osvaldo Martínez; Mauro Martínez	Peru; Daniel Aguero; Luis Pizarro; Arian Prado; Jimmy Figueroa; Mauricio Gallegos
Individual all-around	Didier Lugo (COL)	Daniel Villafañe (ARG)	Jostyn Fuenmayor (VEN)
Floor exercise	Victor Rostagno (URU)	Didier Lugo (COL)	Daniel Aguero (PER)
Pommel horse	Jostyn Fuenmayor (VEN)	Didier Lugo (COL)	Mauricio Gallegos (PER)
Rings	Didier Lugo (COL)	Kristopher Bohórquez (COL)	Jostyn Fuenmayor (VEN)
Vault	Mauro Martínez (ARG)	Daniel Aguero (PER)	Victor Rostagno (URU)
Parallel bars	Federico Molinari (ARG)	Osvaldo Martínez (ARG)	Jostyn Fuenmayor (VEN)
Horizontal bar	Didier Lugo (COL)	Osvaldo Martínez (ARG) Daniel Gómez (ECU)	—N/a
Women
Team all-around	Argentina; Ailen Valente; Tamara Casco; Mayra Vaquie; Esperanza Fernández; María Stoffel	Colombia; Valentina Pardo; Ginna Escobar; Nathalia Sánchez; Lesly Garzon	Chile; María del Mar Pérez; María del Sol Pérez; Martina Castro; Camila Vilches; Melany Cabrera
Individual all-around	Ginna Escobar (COL)	Tamara Casco (ARG)	Mayra Vaquie (ARG)
Vault	Ariana Orrego (PER)	Camila Vilches (CHI)	Ana Mendez (PER)
Uneven bars	Ariana Orrego (PER)	María del Mar Pérez (CHI)	Nathalia Sánchez (COL)
Balance beam	Ginna Escobar (COL)	Valentina Pardo (COL)	Melany Cabrera (CHI)
Floor exercise	Ginna Escobar (COL)	Nathalia Sánchez (COL)	Mayra Vaquie (ARG)

== Medal table ==
Rank	Nation	Gold	Silver	Bronze	Total
1	Colombia (COL)	7	6	1	14
2	Argentina (ARG)	3	5	2	10
3	Peru (PER)	2	1	4	7
4	Venezuela (VEN)	1	0	3	4
5	Uruguay (URU)	1	0	1	2
6	Chile (CHI)	0	2	2	4
7	Ecuador (ECU)	0	1	0	1
Totals (7 entries)		14	15	13	42
