= Ana Padurariu =

Canadian artistic gymnast

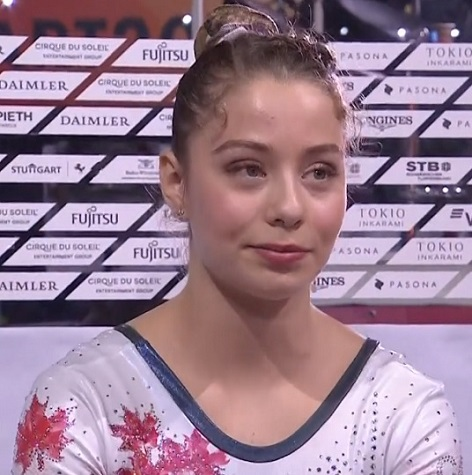
- Padurariu in 2019

Personal information
- Full name: Anne-Marie Padurariu
- Born: August 1, 2002 (age 24) Bracebridge, Ontario, Canada
- Height: 5 ft 3 in (160 cm)
- Spouse: Tommy Silva (m. 2024)

Gymnastics career
- Discipline: Women's artistic gymnastics
- Country represented: Canada (2015–21)
- College team: UCLA Bruins (2022–23); Utah Red Rocks (2025–26)
- Club: Gemini Gymnastics
- Head coach: Yelena Davydova
Medal record
Artistic gymnastics
Representing Canada
World Championships
Silver medal – second place	2018 Doha	Balance Beam
FIG World Cup
Event / 1st / 2nd / 3rd; All-Around World Cup / 0 / 1 / 0

Anne-Marie "Ana" Padurariu (Romanian: Ana Pădurariu; born August 1, 2002) is a Canadian artistic gymnast and the 2018 World Championships silver medalist on balance beam.

== Early and personal life ==
Ana Padurariu is of Romanian descent. Born in Bracebridge, Ontario, she was raised in Whitby. She attended Sinclair Secondary School. Padurariu trained at Gemini Gymnastics (located in Oshawa, Ontario), where she took up gymnastics at the age of four.

Padurariu married American soccer player Tommy Silva in 2024.

== Gymnastics career ==
=== 2016–17 ===
As a junior, in 2016–2017, Padurariu won every gold (five gold medals, the all-around and all four apparatus events) at the 2016 Olympic Hopes Cup, the 2017 Elite Canada, and the 2017 Canadian Artistic Gymnastics Championships and four golds (except on vault) at the 2016 Pan American Artistic Gymnastics Championships. She also did well at two international events, the City of Jesolo Trophy (Italy) and the Gymnix Junior Cup (Montreal, Canada). As a result, she was named Gymnastics Canada's junior athlete of 2017.

=== 2018 ===
Padurariu debuted at the senior level at the 2018 Elite Canada, winning the all-around silver. She was leading after three events, but fell on vault. Later she learned that she had two fractures in her left foot.

In September 2018, Padurariu was part of the Canadian team that finished in fourth place in the team competition at the 2018 senior Pan American Artistic Gymnastics Championship.

Padurariu was included in the Canadian team for the 2018 World Artistic Gymnastics Championships in Doha, Qatar, where she helped Canada to its best-ever fourth place in the team event, and qualified in fifth place for the final on balance beam. In the beam final, she won silver with 14.100 points, behind Liu Tingting of China with 14.533 points and ahead of Simone Biles of the United States with 13.600 points. It was only the fourth worlds medal in the history of Canadian women's artistic gymnastics. Padurariu is also her country's second-ever world medalist on beam.

=== 2019 ===
In March, Padurariu competed at the Stuttgart World Cup. She finished in second place behind Simone Biles. In May, she competed at the Canadian National Championships. After the first day of competition, Padurariu was leading, but a fall off the balance beam on the second day allowed Ellie Black to take the gold, leaving Padurariu with the silver. Additionally, she won gold on uneven bars, silver on balance beam behind Brooklyn Moors, and bronze on floor exercise behind Black and Moors.

In June, Padurariu was named to the team to compete at the 2019 Pan American Games alongside Black, Moors, Shallon Olsen, and Victoria-Kayen Woo. She later had to pull out after sustaining another fracture to her left foot.

On September 4, Padurariu was named to the team to compete at the 2019 World Championships in Stuttgart, Germany alongside Black, Olsen, Moors, and Woo. Due to her injury, Padruariu competed only on bars and beam in the qualification round, where she helped Canada qualify to the team final and individually qualified to the balance beam final. Canada placed seventh overall. In the event finals, Padurariu competed on balance beam only but fell on her triple wolf turn.

In October, Padurariu announced on Instagram that she had verbally committed to attend UCLA on a gymnastics scholarship. A month later she signed her National Letter of Intent with the Bruins, starting in the 2020–21 school year.

=== 2020 ===
In late January, it was announced that Padurariu would compete at the Stuttgart World Cup taking place in March. In early February, it was announced that she would also compete at the Birmingham World Cup taking place in late March. Her first competition of the season was Elite Canada, where she placed first in the all-around, ahead of Brooklyn Moors. The Stuttgart World Cup was later canceled due to the COVID-19 pandemic in Germany as was the Birmingham World Cup due to the COVID-19 pandemic in the United Kingdom.

== Collegiate gymnastics career ==
=== Regular season ranking ===
Season	All-around	Vault	Uneven bars	Balance beam	Floor exercise
2022	N/A	N/A	367th	65th	N/A
2023	N/A	N/A	49th	178th	N/A
2025	N/A	N/A	187th	75th	N/A
2026	N/A	N/A	15th	61st	N/A

== Competitive history ==
Competitive history of Ana Padurariu at the junior level
Year	Event	Team	AA	VT	UB	BB	FX
2015	International Gymnix	1st place, gold medalist(s)	9		4	2nd place, silver medalist(s)	
2015	City of Jesolo Trophy	2nd place, silver medalist(s)	7			6	
2016	Elite Canada		2nd place, silver medalist(s)				
2016	International Gymnix	3rd place, bronze medalist(s)	6		8		2nd place, silver medalist(s)
2016	City of Jesolo Trophy		4		7	6	4
2016	Canadian Championships		1st place, gold medalist(s)		1st place, gold medalist(s)	1st place, gold medalist(s)	
2016	Pan American Championships	1st place, gold medalist(s)	1st place, gold medalist(s)		1st place, gold medalist(s)	1st place, gold medalist(s)	1st place, gold medalist(s)
2016	Olympic Hopes Cup	1st place, gold medalist(s)	1st place, gold medalist(s)	1st place, gold medalist(s)	1st place, gold medalist(s)	1st place, gold medalist(s)	1st place, gold medalist(s)
2017	Elite Canada		1st place, gold medalist(s)	1st place, gold medalist(s)	1st place, gold medalist(s)	1st place, gold medalist(s)	1st place, gold medalist(s)
2017	International Gymnix	4	10	5	4		3rd place, bronze medalist(s)
2017	City of Jesolo Trophy	7	5	3rd place, bronze medalist(s)	4	1st place, gold medalist(s)	6
2017	Canadian Championships		1st place, gold medalist(s)	1st place, gold medalist(s)	1st place, gold medalist(s)	1st place, gold medalist(s)	1st place, gold medalist(s)
2017	Junior Japan International		5		5	2nd place, silver medalist(s)	
2017	Elite Gym Massilia (Masters)	3rd place, bronze medalist(s)	3rd place, bronze medalist(s)		3rd place, bronze medalist(s)	3rd place, bronze medalist(s)	2nd place, silver medalist(s)
2017	Elite Gym Massilia (Open)	1st place, gold medalist(s)	1st place, gold medalist(s)				

Competitive history of Ana Padurariu at the senior level
Year	Event	Team	AA	VT	UB	BB	FX
2018	Elite Canada		2nd place, silver medalist(s)				
2018	Canadian Championships				2nd place, silver medalist(s)		
2018	Pan American Championships	4				4	
2018	World Championships	4				2nd place, silver medalist(s)	
2019	Elite Canada		1st place, gold medalist(s)		1st place, gold medalist(s)	1st place, gold medalist(s)	1st place, gold medalist(s)
2019	L'International Gymnix		11		1st place, gold medalist(s)		7
2019	Stuttgart World Cup		2nd place, silver medalist(s)				
2019	Canadian Championships		2nd place, silver medalist(s)		1st place, gold medalist(s)	2nd place, silver medalist(s)	3rd place, bronze medalist(s)
2019	World Championships	7				8	
2020	Elite Canada		1st place, gold medalist(s)		5	1st place, gold medalist(s)	2nd place, silver medalist(s)

Competitive history of Ondine Achampong at the NCAA level
Year	Event	Team	AA	VT	UB	BB	FX
2022	PAC-12 Championships	4					
2023	PAC-12 Championships	2nd place, silver medalist(s)					
2023	NCAA Championships	5					
2025	Big 12 Championships	1st place, gold medalist(s)					
2025	NCAA Championships	3rd place, bronze medalist(s)					
2026	Big 12 Championships	1st place, gold medalist(s)					
