= Martina Dominici =

Argentine artistic gymnast (born 2002)

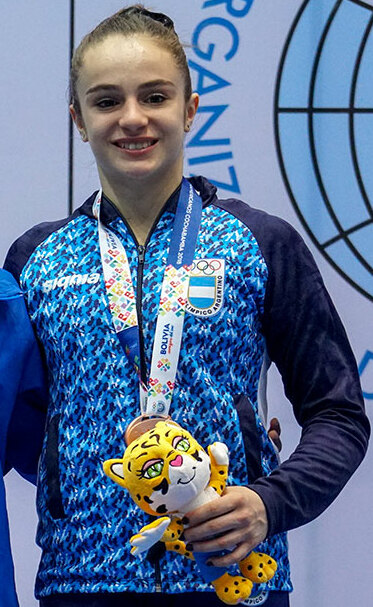
- Dominici at the 2018 South American Games

Personal information
- Nicknames: Martu, Domi
- Born: 3 January 2002 (age 24) Buenos Aires, Argentina

Gymnastics career
- Country represented: Argentina (2018–2021)
- Club: Circulo Gimnastico Norte
- Head coach: Agustina Mignone
Medal record
Women's artistic gymnastics
Representing Argentina
South American Games
Gold medal – first place	2018 Cochabamba	All-around
Silver medal – second place	2018 Cochabamba	Team
Bronze medal – third place	2018 Cochabamba	Vault
Bronze medal – third place	2018 Cochabamba	Uneven bars
Bronze medal – third place	2018 Cochabamba	Balance beam
Bronze medal – third place	2018 Cochabamba	Floor exercise
South American Championships
Gold medal – first place	2019 Santiago	Team
Gold medal – first place	2019 Santiago	Vault
Pan American Championships
Disqualified	2021 Rio de Janeiro	Vault
Disqualified	2021 Rio de Janeiro	All-around
Disqualified	2021 Rio de Janeiro	Floor exercise
Disqualified	2021 Rio de Janeiro	Uneven bars
Disqualified	2021 Rio de Janeiro	Team

Martina Dominici (born 3 January 2002) is an Argentine former artistic gymnast. As a junior, she won multiple Pan American and South American Championships medals and won the all-around title at the 2017 Top Gym Tournament. She moved up to the senior level in 2018 and won the all-around title at the South American Games. She competed at the 2018 and 2019 World Championships– where she qualified for the 2020 Summer Olympics. However, after winning five medals at the 2021 Pan American Championships, she tested positive for multiple banned substances and received a three-year suspension, leading to her retirement.

== Gymnastics career ==
Dominici began gymnastics when she was six years old.

=== Junior ===
At the 2016 Pan American Championships, Dominici won a silver medal on the floor exercise behind Canada's Ana Padurariu, and she won the vault bronze medal. She then won the all-around bronze medal at the 2016 South American Junior Championships. She also won silver medals in the team, vault, and floor exercise events and a bronze medal on the uneven bars.

Dominici won the uneven bars gold medal at the 2017 South American Junior Championships. She won silver medals in the other three apparatus finals and with the Argentine team, and she won the all-around bronze medal. She won the all-around title at the 2017 Top Gym Tournament, a prestigious junior competition in Belgium.

=== Senior ===
Dominici became age-eligible for senior competitions in 2018. She made her senior debut at the 2018 International Gymnix and won the vault silver medal behind Canada's Shallon Olsen. She won the all-around title at the 2018 South American Games, and she won bronze medals in all four event finals. She helped Argentina finish 23rd in the team qualifications at the 2018 World Championships.

Dominici helped Argentina win the team title at the 2019 South American Championships, and she won the vault title. She represented Argentina at the 2019 Pan American Games and helped the team finish in fourth place. She qualified for the individual all-around final and finished fifth. In the event finals, she finished sixth on the vault, fifth on the uneven bars, and sixth on the floor exercise. She then competed at the 2019 World Championships and finished 31st in the all-around during the qualification round. With this result, she earned a berth for the 2020 Summer Olympics.

==== Doping and suspension ====
At the 2021 Pan American Championships, Dominici initially won five medals, including the vault gold medal and the all-around silver medal. However, during in-competition doping testing on 5 June, she tested positive for both stanozolol and oxandrolone. The Argentinian National Anti-Doping Organization conducted an out-of-competition test on 16 June, where she once again tested positive for the two banned substances. Dominici did not challenge the results and was thus suspended for three years, rather than four. She was stripped of the medals she won at the 2021 Pan American Championships.

As a result of the suspension, Dominici was did not compete at the 2020 Summer Olympics, and she was replaced by teammate Abigail Magistrati. The suspension ended on 21 June 2024, which effectively ruled her out of from qualifying to compete at the 2024 Summer Olympics. She retired from the sport as a result of the suspension.
