= Ailen Valente =

Argentine artistic gymnast (born 1996)

- Nickname: Ailu
- Born: 26 March 1996 (age 30) Buenos Aires, Argentina
- Height: 1.67 m (5 ft 6 in)

Gymnastics career
- Discipline: Women's artistic gymnastics
- Country represented: Argentina
- Club: Club Argym
- Head coach: Florencia Gugliada
Medal record
Women's artistic gymnastics
Representing Argentina
Pan American Championships
Bronze medal – third place	2016 Sucre	Uneven bars
Bronze medal – third place	2016 Sucre	Floor exercise
South American Championships
Gold medal – first place	2012 Rosario	Team
Gold medal – first place	2014 Cochabamba	All-around
Gold medal – first place	2016 Lima	Team
Silver medal – second place	2011 Santiago	Team
Silver medal – second place	2013 Santiago	Team
Silver medal – second place	2014 Cochabamba	Uneven bars
Silver medal – second place	2015 Cali	Team
Silver medal – second place	2015 Cali	Uneven bars
Silver medal – second place	2017 Cochabamba	Team
Bronze medal – third place	2014 Cochabamba	Balance beam
Bronze medal – third place	2014 Cochabamba	Floor exercise

Ailen Valente (born 26 March 1996) is an Argentine former artistic gymnast. She won two bronze medals at the 2016 Pan American Championships and also competed at the 2016 Summer Olympics. She is the 2014 South American all-around champion and a two-time South American Championships team gold medalist.

== Gymnastics career ==
At the 2011 South American Championships, Valente helped Argentina win the team silver medal behind Brazil. She then won a team gold medal at the 2012 South American Championships. She competed on the vault and uneven bars at the 2012 Osijek World Challenge Cup but did not advance into either final.

Valente placed 23rd in the all-around at the 2014 Pan American Championships. She competed at her first World Championships in 2014 and finished 72nd in the all-around qualifications. At the 2014 South American Championships, she won the all-around gold medal. In the event finals, she won a silver medal on the uneven bars and bronze medals on the balance beam and floor exercise.

Valente finished sixth on the floor exercise at the 2015 São Paulo World Cup. She then won a silver medal in the team competition at the 2015 South American Championships. She also won a silver medal on the uneven bars, behind Jade Barbosa. She represented Argentina at the 2015 Pan American Games and advanced into the all-around final, finishing 12th. She finished 80th in the all-around qualifications at the 2015 World Championships.

Valente competed at the 2016 Olympic Test Event and finished 61st in the all-around, qualifying for the 2016 Olympic Games. At the 2016 Summer Olympics in Rio de Janeiro, Valente finished 56th in the all-around qualification round with a total score of 50.065 after falling on both the balance beam and floor exercise. After the Olympic Games, she competed at the 2016 Pan American Championships and won bronze medals on both the uneven bars and the floor exercise. At the 2016 South American Championships in Lima, she won a gold medal in the team competition.

Valente won a silver medal in the team competition at the 2017 South American Championships. This marked the final competition of her career.
