= Valeria Pereyra =

Argentine artistic gymnast (born 1996)

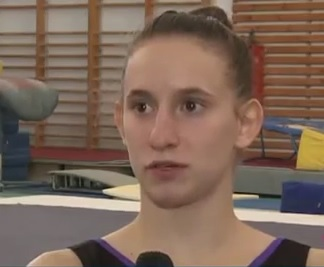
- Pereyra in 2012

Personal information
- Born: 12 February 1996 (age 30) Buenos Aires, Argentina
- Height: 158 cm (5 ft 2 in)

Gymnastics career
- Discipline: Women's artistic gymnastics
- Country represented: Argentina
Medal record
Women's artistic gymnastics
Representing Argentina
South American Championships
Gold medal – first place	2011 Santiago	Uneven bars
Gold medal – first place	2012 Rosario	Team
Gold medal – first place	2019 Santiago	Team
Gold medal – first place	2019 Santiago	Uneven bars
Silver medal – second place	2011 Santiago	Team
Silver medal – second place	2012 Rosario	Floor exercise
Bronze medal – third place	2011 Santiago	All-around
FIG World Cup
Event / 1st / 2nd / 3rd; World Challenge Cup / 0 / 0 / 1

Valeria Pereyra (born 12 February 1996) is an Argentine former artistic gymnast. She competed at the 2012 Summer Olympics and is a two-time South American champion on the uneven bars.

== Gymnastics career ==
At the 2011 South American Championships, Pereyra helped Argentina win the team silver medal behind Brazil. Additionally, she won a gold medal on the uneven bars and a bronze medal in the all-around. She competed at the 2012 Olympic Test Event and finished 46th in the all-around, receiving a berth for the 2012 Summer Olympics. She then competed at the 2012 Osijek World Challenge Cup and finished eighth in the uneven bars final. At the Maribor World Challenge Cup, she won a bronze medal on the uneven bars, behind Céline van Gerner and Marta Pihan-Kulesza.

Pereyra represented Argentina at the 2012 Summer Olympics and finished 51st in the all-around during the qualification round. After the Olympic Games, she won a team gold medal at the 2012 South American Championships. She also won a silver medal on the floor exercise. At the 2013 Pan American Championships, she finished fourth on the uneven bars and seventh on the balance beam.

Pereyra tore her ACL at the end of 2013 and retired from gymnastics. She began training again in October 2018. She helped Argentina win the team title at the 2019 South American Championships, and she also won the uneven bars title. She represented Argentina at the 2019 Pan American Games and helped the team finish in fourth place. She finished 20th in the uneven bars qualification and did not advance into the apparatus final. She then won a silver medal on the floor exercise at the 2019 Argentinian Championships. Pereyra last competed at the 2022 Argentinian Championships.
