= 2019 South American Artistic Gymnastics Championships =

International artistic gymnastics competition

The 2019 South American Artistic Gymnastics Championships was held in Santiago, Chile, from June 18 to 23, 2019. The competition was organized by the Chilean Gymnastics Federation and approved by the International Gymnastics Federation.

== Participating nations ==
- Argentina
- Bolivia
- Brazil
- Chile
- Colombia
- Ecuador
- Panama
- Peru
- Uruguay
- Venezuela

== Medalists ==
Event	Gold	Silver	Bronze
Men
Team all-around	Brazil; Arthur Mariano; Francisco Barreto; Lucas Bitencourt; Leonardo Souza; Péricles Silva; Tomás Florêncio	Colombia; Andrés Martínez; Didier Lugo; Javier Sandoval; José Martínez; José David Toro; Carlos Calvo	Venezuela; Adickxon Trejo; Junior Rojo; Maycol Puentes; Jostyn Fuenmayor; Orlando Briceño; Edwin Acosta
Individual all-around	Francisco Barreto (BRA)	Arthur Mariano (BRA)	Andrés Martínez (COL)
Floor exercise	Lucas Bitencourt (BRA)	Victor Rostagno (URU)	Tomás Florêncio (BRA)
Pommel horse	Péricles Silva (BRA)	Jesús Moreto (PER)	Santiago Mayol (ARG)
Rings	Lucas Bitencourt (BRA)	Didier Lugo (COL)	Jostyn Fuenmayor (VEN)
Vault	Daniel Aguero (PER)	José David Toro (COL)	Maycol Puentes (VEN)
Parallel bars	Jostyn Fuenmayor (VEN)	Carlos Calvo (COL)	Péricles Silva (BRA)
Horizontal bar	Arthur Mariano (BRA)	Lucas Bitencourt (BRA)	Javier Sandoval (COL)
Women
Team all-around	Argentina; Abigail Magistrati; Luna Fernandez; Martina Dominici; Agustina Pisos; Sira Macias; Valeria Pereyra	Chile; Franchesca Santi; Maria del Sol Perez; Maria del Mar Perez; Simona Castro; Martina Castro; Makarena Pinto	Peru; Ariana Orrego; Fabiola Diaz; Nicole Espinoza; Nadya Chacon; Ana Sarango; Venere Horna
Individual all-around	Abigail Magistrati (ARG)	Ariana Orrego (PER)	Agustina Pisos (ARG)
Vault	Martina Dominici (ARG)	Franchesca Santi (CHI)	Diana Vásquez (BOL)
Uneven bars	Valeria Pereyra (ARG)	Luna Fernandez (ARG)	Angie Rodriguez (COL)
Balance beam	Ariana Orrego (PER)	Abigail Magistrati (ARG)	Angie Rodriguez (COL)
Floor exercise	Franchesca Santi (CHI)	Ariana Orrego (PER)	Katriel de Sousa (VEN)

== Medal table ==
Rank	Nation	Gold	Silver	Bronze	Total
1	Brazil (BRA)	6	2	2	10
2	Argentina (ARG)	4	2	2	8
3	Peru (PER)	2	3	1	6
4	Chile (CHI)	1	2	0	3
5	Venezuela (VEN)	1	0	4	5
6	Colombia (COL)	0	4	4	8
7	Uruguay (URU)	0	1	0	1
8	Bolivia (BOL)	0	0	1	1
Totals (8 entries)		14	14	14	42
