= Federico Molinari (gymnast) =

Argentine artistic gymnast (born 1984)

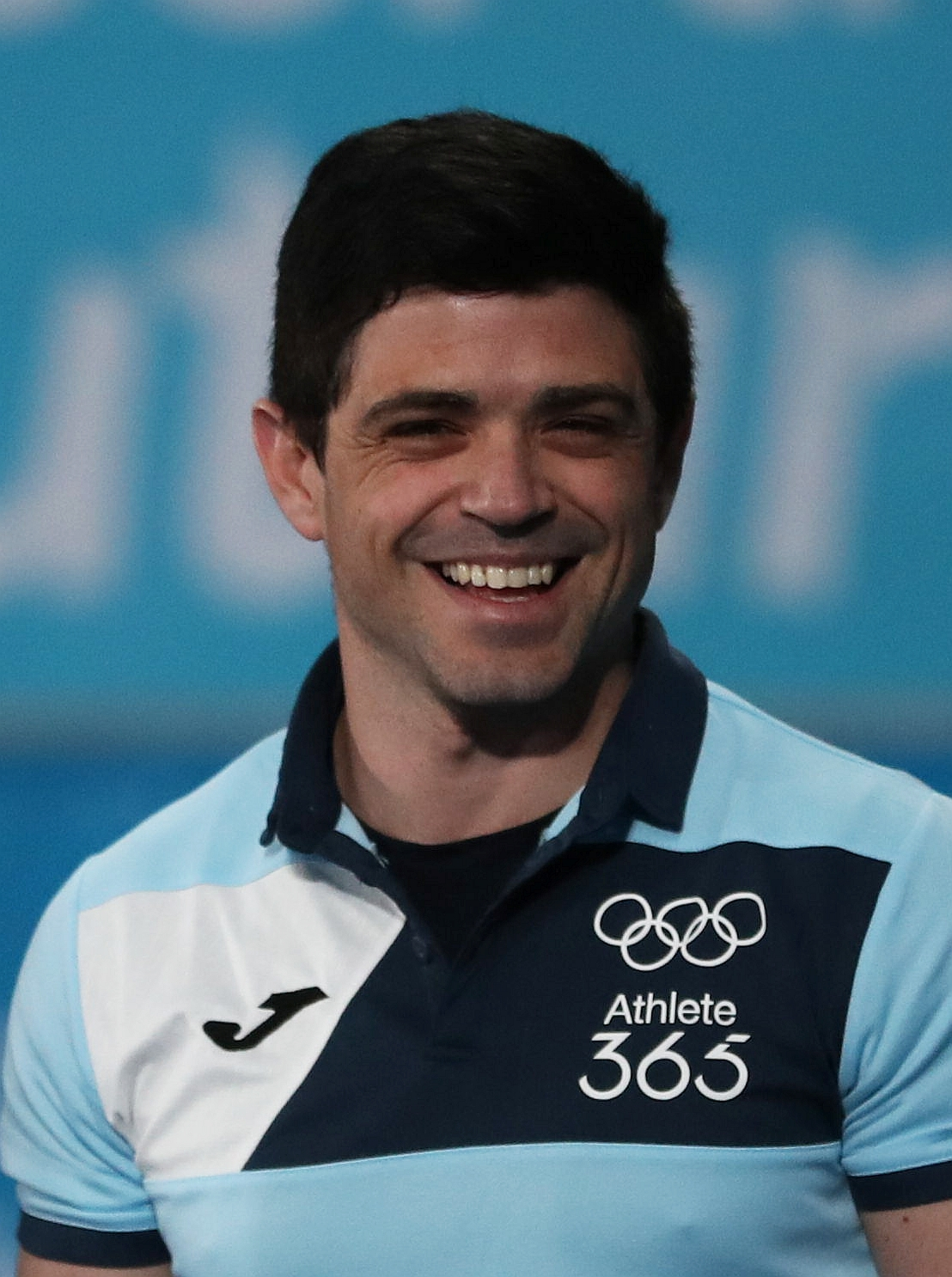
- Federico Molinari at the 2018 Summer Youth Olympics

Personal information
- Full name: Federico Martin Molinari
- Born: January 11, 1984 (age 42)

Gymnastics career
- Discipline: Men's artistic gymnastics
- Country represented: Argentina (2002–)
- Eponymous skills: Molinari (Still Rings)
Medal record
Men's artistic gymnastics
Representing Argentina
Pan American Games
Bronze medal – third place	2019 Lima	Rings
Pan American Championships
Gold medal – first place	2012 Medellín	Rings
Gold medal – first place	2016 Sucre	Rings
Gold medal – first place	2017 Lima	Rings
Silver medal – second place	2008 Rosario	Rings
Silver medal – second place	2013 San Juan	Rings
Silver medal – second place	2018 Lima	Rings
Silver medal – second place	2021 Rio de Janeiro	Rings
Bronze medal – third place	2008 Rosario	Parallel bars
Bronze medal – third place	2010 Guadalajara	Rings
South American Games
Silver medal – second place	2002 Curitiba	Team
Silver medal – second place	2014 Santiago	Rings
Silver medal – second place	2018 Cochabamba	Rings
Bronze medal – third place	2002 Curitiba	Rings
Bronze medal – third place	2006 Buenos Aires	Team
Bronze medal – third place	2010 Medellín	Team
Bronze medal – third place	2010 Medellín	Rings
Bronze medal – third place	2014 Santiago	Team
Bronze medal – third place	2018 Cochabamba	Team
South American Championships
Gold medal – first place	2009 Sogamoso	Rings
Gold medal – first place	2011 Santiago	Rings
Gold medal – first place	2012 Rosario	Rings
Gold medal – first place	2013 Santiago	Rings
Gold medal – first place	2016 Lima	Parallel bars
Gold medal – first place	2017 Cochabamba	Rings
Silver medal – second place	2009 Sogamoso	Floor exercise
Silver medal – second place	2012 Rosario	Team
Silver medal – second place	2012 Rosario	Parallel bars
Silver medal – second place	2014 Cochabamba	Team
Silver medal – second place	2014 Cochabamba	Rings
Silver medal – second place	2014 Cochabamba	Parallel bars
Silver medal – second place	2016 Lima	Team
Silver medal – second place	2017 Cochabamba	Team
Silver medal – second place	2021 San Juan	Team
Silver medal – second place	2021 San Juan	Rings
Bronze medal – third place	2009 Sogamoso	Team
Bronze medal – third place	2009 Sogamoso	Pommel horse
Bronze medal – third place	2009 Sogamoso	Parallel bars
Bronze medal – third place	2011 Santiago	Parallel bars
Bronze medal – third place	2013 Santiago	Horizontal bar

Federico Martin Molinari (born 11 January 1984) is an Argentine male artistic gymnast and part of the national team. He participated at the 2012 Summer Olympics in London, United Kingdom.
