= Gemini Gymnastics =

Gemini Gymnastics is a high performance Canadian gymnastics club located in Oshawa, Ontario. It was established in 1979 as a parent-run club. Head coach Elena Davydova was the gold medallist in the women's artistic individual all-around at the 1980 Summer Olympics in Moscow.

== Honours ==
Gemini Gymnastics is one of the top gymnastics clubs in Canada. In 2012 it was awarded a Gold "Club of Excellence" Award by Gymnastics Canada, the highest award of its kind. Gemini has won this award for 10 straight years, ever since the award's creation in 2003 and is only one of two clubs in Canada to have done so.

Gemini has produced champions in all levels of competitive gymnastics, including 25 Canadian All Around (AA) Champions, 13 Elite Canada AA Champions, 26 Eastern Canadian AA Champions and 130 Ontario AA Champions, World Silver Medalist, two Olympians..etc..≥

Elena Davydova, Gymnastics Canada Life Member, was also named Ontario's Female Coach of the Year in 2012 and 1996, 2004-05, 2005-06, 2009-10, 2012, 2013, 2016, 2017 Junior/Senior Canada's Coach of the Year. In 2019 was awarded Coaching Excellence Award from Coaching Association of Canada.

== Olympics/World Championships ==
In June 2012, Kristina Vaculik was named to the Canadian Olympic Women's Artistic Gymnastic's Team, and Elena was named as one of the team's coaches. On July 29, the Canadian team made team finals, the first Canadian gymnastics team to make a team final in a non-boycotted year. On July 31, the team came 5th in the women's artistic team all-around finals, behind the United States, Russia, Romania, and China.

Ana Padurariu, winner of 4 medals at the 2019 Canadian Championships

Silver Medalist in the A-Around behind Simone Biles at the 2019 World Cup in Stuttgart, GER

2019 Elite Canada Champion in A-Around, Bars, Beam and Floor

World Silver Medallist on Beam at her first World Championships in 2018 and best-ever result with Team Canada 4th place in the Team Final

Made her Senior debut in 2018 winning the A-Around silver medal at Elite Canada and Bars Silver at Canadian Championships

Won every event & A-Around (5 golds) at the 2017 Canadian Championships, 2017 Elite Canada and 2016 Olympic Hopes Cup.

Won 4 gold medals at the 2016 Pan American Championships.

Ava Stewart, in July 2021 competed at the 2020 Tokyo Olympics.
