= Didier Yamit Lugo Sichaca =

Colombian artistic gymnast (born 1991)

- Born: 10 September 1991 (age 34)

Gymnastics career
- Discipline: Men's artistic gymnastics
- Country represented: Colombia (2007–)
- Gym: Universal Gymnastics, Miami, FL
- Head coach: Yin Alvarez
Medal record
Representing Colombia
Pan American Games
| Bronze medal – third place | 2015 Toronto | Team |
Pan American Championships
| Gold medal – first place | 2016 Sucre | Horizontal bar |
| Silver medal – second place | 2016 Sucre | Floor exercise |
| Silver medal – second place | 2016 Sucre | Rings |
| Silver medal – second place | 2018 Lima | Team |
South American Games
| Gold medal – first place | 2010 Medellín | Horizontal bar |
| Silver medal – second place | 2010 Medellín | Team |
| Silver medal – second place | 2010 Medellín | All-around |
| Silver medal – second place | 2010 Medellín | Pommel horse |
| Silver medal – second place | 2010 Medellín | Rings |
South American Championships
| Gold medal – first place | 2009 Sogamoso | Team |
| Gold medal – first place | 2016 Lima | Team |
| Gold medal – first place | 2016 Lima | All-around |
| Gold medal – first place | 2016 Lima | Rings |
| Gold medal – first place | 2016 Lima | Horizontal bar |
| Silver medal – second place | 2009 Sogamoso | All-around |
| Silver medal – second place | 2016 Lima | Floor exercise |
| Silver medal – second place | 2016 Lima | Pommel horse |
| Silver medal – second place | 2019 Santiago | Team |
| Silver medal – second place | 2019 Santiago | Rings |
Central American and Caribbean Games
| Gold medal – first place | 2018 Barranquilla | Team |
| Bronze medal – third place | 2010 Mayagüez | Team |

Didier Yamit Lugo Sichaca (born 10 September 1991) is a Colombian artistic gymnast, representing his nation at international competitions. He participated at the 2009 World Artistic Gymnastics Championships in London, Great Britain.
