= 2016 Pan American Individual Event Artistic Gymnastics Championships =

International sports competition

Pan American Artistic Gymnastics Championships
- Location: Sucre, Bolivia
- Date: September 12–18, 2016

The 2016 Pan American Individual Event Artistic Gymnastics Championships was held in Sucre, Bolivia, September 12–18, 2016. The competition was organized by the Bolivian Gymnastics Federation and approved by the International Gymnastics Federation.

== Medal summary ==
=== Senior medalists ===
Event	Gold	Silver	Bronze
Men
Floor exercise	Jorge Vega (GUA)	Didier Lugo (COL)	Victor Rostagno (URU)
Pommel horse	Fellipe Arakawa (BRA)	Israel Chiriboga (ECU)	Jorge Íñigo (MEX)
Rings	Federico Molinari (ARG)	Didier Lugo (COL)	Daniel Villafañe (ARG)
Vault	Jorge Vega (GUA)	Dilan Jiménez (COL)	Victor Rostagno (URU)
Parallel bars	Dilan Jiménez (COL)	Caio Souza (BRA)	Jorge Vega (GUA)
Horizontal bar	Didier Lugo (COL)	Osvaldo Martinez (ARG)	Christian Bruno (CHI)
Women
Vault	Nicolle Castro (MEX)	Leticia Costa (BRA)	Esperanza Fernandez (ARG)
Uneven bars	Nicolle Castro (MEX)	Nathalia Sánchez (COL)	Ailen Valente (ARG)
Balance beam	Milena Theodoro (BRA)	Meaghan Ruttan (CAN)	Nicolle Castro (MEX)
Floor exercise	Milena Theodoro (BRA)	Nicole Diaz (PUR)	Ailen Valente (ARG)

=== Junior medalists ===
Event	Gold	Silver	Bronze
Boys
Team	United States; Andrew Bitner; Justin Chow; Vitaliy Guimaraes; Bennet Huang	Brazil; Bernardo Actos; Diogo Soares; Tomás Florêncio; Murilo de Souza	Mexico; Esteban de la Cruz; Josué Juárez; Isaac Núñez; Joshua Valle
All-around	Bernardo Actos (BRA)	Bennet Huang (USA)	Andrew Bitner (USA)
Floor exercise	Bernardo Actos (BRA) Vitaliy Guimaraes (USA)	—	Jose David Toro (COL)
Pommel horse	Bennet Huang (USA)	Andrew Bitner (USA)	Bernardo Actos (BRA)
Rings	Andrew Bitner (USA)	Bernardo Actos (BRA)	Santiago Mayol (ARG)
Vault	Jose David Toro (COL)	Joshua Valle (MEX)	Vitaliy Guimaraes (USA) Bennet Huang (USA)
Parallel bars	Julian Jato (ARG)	Bernardo Actos (BRA)	Isaac Núñez (MEX)
Horizontal bar	Bernardo Actos (BRA)	Vitaliy Guimaraes (USA)	Bennet Huang (USA)
Girls
Team	Canada; Jade Chrobok; Haley de Jong; Ana Padurariu; Sayge Urban	Argentina; Maria Bernal; Camila Bonzo; Martina Dominici; Agustina Pisos	Mexico; Paulina Guerra; Louise Lopez; Jimena Moreno; Andrea Pirsch
All-around	Ana Padurariu (CAN)	Thaís Fidélis (BRA)	Sayge Urban (CAN)
Vault	Thaís Fidélis (BRA)	Sayge Urban (CAN)	Martina Dominici (ARG)
Uneven bars	Ana Padurariu (CAN)	Jade Chrobok (CAN)	Agustina Pisos (ARG)
Balance beam	Ana Padurariu (CAN)	Thaís Fidélis (BRA)	Haley de Jong (CAN)
Floor exercise	Ana Padurariu (CAN)	Martina Dominici (ARG)	Andrea Pirsch (MEX)

== Medal table ==
=== Seniors ===
Rank	Nation	Gold	Silver	Bronze	Total
1	Brazil (BRA)	3	2	0	5
2	Colombia (COL)	2	4	0	6
3	Mexico (MEX)	2	0	2	4
4	Guatemala (GUA)	2	0	1	3
5	Argentina (ARG)	1	1	4	6
6	Canada (CAN)	0	1	0	1
6	Ecuador (ECU)	0	1	0	1
6	Puerto Rico (PUR)	0	1	0	1
9	Uruguay (URU)	0	0	2	2
10	Chile (CHI)	0	0	1	1
Totals (10 entries)		10	10	10	30

=== Juniors ===
Rank	Nation	Gold	Silver	Bronze	Total
1	Canada (CAN)	5	2	2	9
2	Brazil (BRA)	4	5	1	10
3	United States (USA)	4	3	4	11
4	Argentina (ARG)	1	2	3	6
5	Colombia (COL)	1	0	1	2
6	Mexico (MEX)	0	1	4	5
Totals (6 entries)		15	13	15	43
