= Abigail Magistrati =

Argentine artistic gymnast

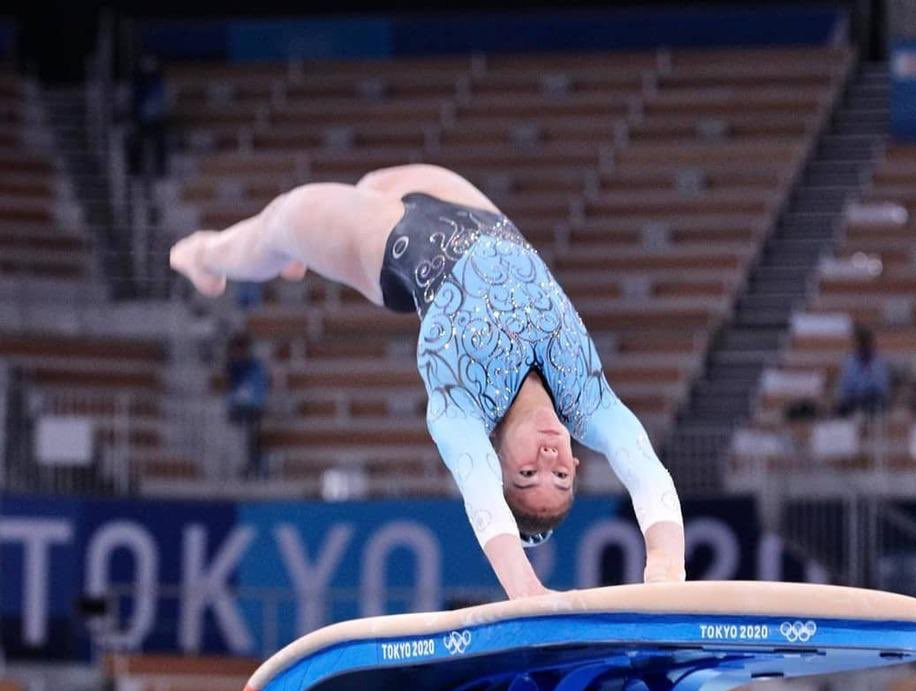
- Magistrati at the 2020 Summer Olympics

Personal information
- Nickname: Abi
- Born: 29 December 2003 (age 22) La Plata, Argentina
- Height: 151 cm (4 ft 11 in)

Gymnastics career
- Country represented: Argentina (2017–2022)
- Club: National Centre of High Performance Athletics
- Head coach: Roger Medina
- Retired: 2023
Medal record
Women's artistic gymnastics
Representing Argentina
Pan American Championships
Bronze medal – third place	2021 Rio de Janeiro	Team
Bronze medal – third place	2021 Rio de Janeiro	Floor exercise
South American Games
Silver medal – second place	2022 Asunción	Team
South American Championships
Gold medal – first place	2019 Santiago	Team
Gold medal – first place	2019 Santiago	All-around
Gold medal – first place	2022 Lima	Balance beam
Silver medal – second place	2019 Santiago	Balance beam
Silver medal – second place	2021 San Juan	Team
Silver medal – second place	2021 San Juan	All-around
Silver medal – second place	2021 San Juan	Floor exercise
Silver medal – second place	2022 Lima	Team
Silver medal – second place	2022 Lima	Floor exercise

Abigail Magistrati (born 29 December 2003) is an Argentine former artistic gymnast. She represented Argentina at the 2020 Summer Olympics after Martina Dominici, the original qualifier, tested positive for a banned substance. She is the 2021 Pan American team and floor exercise bronze medalist. She is the 2019 South American all-around and team champion and the 2022 South American balance beam champion. She is the 2022 Argentine all-around, balance beam, and floor exercise champion.

== Early life ==
Magistrati was born in La Plata and began gymnastics when she was three years old. She has an older sister named Marisol who also does gymnastics.

== Junior gymnastics career ==
=== 2017 ===
Magistrati competed at her debut Argentine Championships in 2017, placing eleventh all-around in the junior division. She was then selected to represent Argentina at the Junior South American Championships where she helped Argentina finish second behind Brazil. Individually, she placed fourth in the all-around, on vault, and floor exercise. She ended the year competing at the South American Youth Games where she helped Argentina win the team competition. Individually, she placed fifth in the all-around and fourth on vault but won gold on the uneven bars.

=== 2018 ===
Magistrati started the season competing at the Pacific Rim Championships. Although Argentina could not win medals as they are not part of the Pacific Rim alliance, they did record the third-highest team score, and Magistrati recorded the fifth-highest all-around score. At the Junior Pan American Championships, Magistrati helped Argentina finish third as a team; Magistrati finished ninth in the all-around. Additionally, she finished fourth on the balance beam and seventh on uneven bars. She then competed at the Argentine Club Championships, where she placed second in the all-around and helped her club place first. In October, Magistrati competed at the Junior South American Championships where she helped Argentina finish second as a team and individually she placed seventh in the all-around. She won gold on vault and silver on uneven bars during the finals. She ended the season competing at the Argentine Championships where she placed third in the all-around. She won gold on vault and silver on uneven bars.

== Senior gymnastics career ==
=== 2019 ===
Magistrati became age-eligible for senior international competitions in 2019. She made her senior debut at the Club Championships, placing first in the all-around. She made her senior international debut at the South American Championships, where she placed first in the all-around and helped Argentina win the team title. She won silver on the balance beam during the event finals and placed seventh on floor exercise. She next competed at the Pan American Games where she helped Argentina place fourth. Individually, she placed eighth on uneven bars and floor exercise. At the Argentine Championships, she placed third in the all-around and first on floor exercise. Magistrati was selected to represent Argentina at the World Championships in Stuttgart, Germany. During qualifications, she finished 36th in the all-around and did not qualify for the final. Also, because teammate Martina Dominici finished ahead of her, Magistrati did not qualify an individual berth to the 2020 Summer Olympics due to the one-per-country limit.

=== 2021 ===
Magistrati did not compete in 2020 due to the COVID-19 pandemic. She returned to competition at the 2021 Pan American Championships, where she helped Argentina place third, and individually she placed tenth in the all-around. She placed eighth on balance beam and fourth on floor exercise; however, teammate Martina Dominici tested positive for a banned substance, and her scores were removed, resulting in Magistrati winning the bronze on floor exercise. Also, Dominici received a one-month ban from competition resulting in her withdrawal from the 2020 Olympic Games. As a result, Magistrati, who originally didn't qualify due to the 1-per-country rule, was awarded the Olympic berth.

Magistrati was the youngest athlete to represent Argentina at the 2020 Summer Olympics. During the qualification round, she finished 69th in the all-around with a total score of 48.265. After the Olympics, she competed at the South American Championships and helped the Argentine team win the silver medal behind Brazil. Magistrati won the silver medal in the all-around and on the floor exercise, both behind Júlia Soares.

=== 2022 ===
Magistrati competed at the Pan American Championships and helped the team finish fifth in the team final. Then at the South American Championships, the Argentine team won the silver medal behind Brazil. Individually, she won the gold medal on the balance beam and the silver medal on the floor exercise. She then helped the Argentine team win the silver medal behind Brazil at the South American Games. She also qualified for the balance beam final where she finished in fourth place. Her final competition was the Argentine Championships where she won the gold medals in the all-around, balance beam, and floor exercise.

Magistrati announced her retirement from gymnastics in 2023.

== Competitive history ==
Year	Event	Team	AA	VT	UB	BB	FX
Junior
2017	Argentine Championships		11				
2017	South American Championships	2nd place, silver medalist(s)	4	4			4
2017	South American Youth Games	1st place, gold medalist(s)	5	4	1st place, gold medalist(s)		
2018	Pacific Rim Championships (Note: Argentina is not a member of the Pacific Rim Alliance; therefore their results are considered unofficial)	3	6		7	7	
2018	Pan American Championships	3rd place, bronze medalist(s)	9		7	4	
2018	ARG Club Championships	1st place, gold medalist(s)	2nd place, silver medalist(s)				
2018	South American Championships	2nd place, silver medalist(s)	7	1st place, gold medalist(s)	2nd place, silver medalist(s)		
2018	Argentine Championships		3rd place, bronze medalist(s)	1st place, gold medalist(s)	2nd place, silver medalist(s)		
Senior
2019	ARG Club Championships		1st place, gold medalist(s)				
2019	South American Championships	1st place, gold medalist(s)	1st place, gold medalist(s)			2nd place, silver medalist(s)	7
2019	Pan American Games	4			8		8
2019	Argentine Championships		3rd place, bronze medalist(s)				1st place, gold medalist(s)
2019	World Championships	19	36				
2021
2021	Pan American Championships	3rd place, bronze medalist(s)	6			7	3rd place, bronze medalist(s)
2021	Olympic Games		69				
2021	South American Championships	2nd place, silver medalist(s)	2nd place, silver medalist(s)				2nd place, silver medalist(s)
2022
2022	Pan American Championships	5					
2022	South American Championships	2nd place, silver medalist(s)				1st place, gold medalist(s)	2nd place, silver medalist(s)
2022	South American Games	2nd place, silver medalist(s)				4	
2022	Argentine Championships		1st place, gold medalist(s)			1st place, gold medalist(s)	1st place, gold medalist(s)
