= Pericles Silva =

Brazilian artistic gymnast (born 1989)

- Full name: Pericles Fouro da Silva
- Born: 26 October 1989 (age 36) Ananindeua, Pará, Brazil

Gymnastics career
- Discipline: Men's artistic gymnastics
- Country represented: Brazil (2015)
Medal record
Men's gymnastics
Representing Brazil
Pan American Games
Gold medal – first place	2011 Guadalajara	Team
Pan American Championships
Silver medal – second place	2010 Guadalajara	Team
Bronze medal – third place	2013 San Juan	Pommel horse
South American Games
Gold medal – first place	2018 Cochabamba	Team
Silver medal – second place	2014 Santiago	Team
Silver medal – second place	2014 Santiago	Pommel horse
Bronze medal – third place	2014 Santiago	Parallel bars
South American Championships
Gold medal – first place	2011 Santiago	Team
Gold medal – first place	2012 Rosario	Team
Gold medal – first place	2015 Cali	Rings
Gold medal – first place	2017 Cochabamba	Team
Gold medal – first place	2017 Cochabamba	Pommel horse
Gold medal – first place	2017 Cochabamba	Parallel bars
Gold medal – first place	2019 Santiago	Team
Gold medal – first place	2019 Santiago	Pommel horse
Silver medal – second place	2011 Santiago	Pommel horse
Silver medal – second place	2015 Cali	Team
Bronze medal – third place	2011 Santiago	All-around
Bronze medal – third place	2019 Santiago	Parallel bars

Pericles Fouro da Silva (born 26 October 1989) is a Brazilian male artistic gymnast and part of the national team. He participated at the 2015 World Artistic Gymnastics Championships in Glasgow.
