= Daniel Agüero =

Peruvian artistic gymnast (born 1997)

- Born: 1997 (age 28–29) Lima, Peru

Gymnastics career
- Discipline: Men's artistic gymnastics
- Country represented: Peru
Medal record
Representing Peru
South American Games
Silver medal – second place	2026 Santa Fe	Vault

Daniel Agüero (born 1997) is a Peruvian artistic gymnast.

In 2017, he competed at the South American Artistic Gymnastics Championships held in Cochabamba, Bolivia. Two years later, in 2019, he competed at the 2019 South American Artistic Gymnastics Championships held in Santiago, Chile.

He won the silver medal in the men's vault event at the 2018 Pacific Rim Gymnastics Championships held in Medellín, Colombia.
