= Victor Rostagno =

Uruguayan artistic gymnast (born 1998)

Victor Eduardo Rostagno Rios
- Born: 4 December 1998 (age 27)

Gymnastics career
- Discipline: Men's artistic gymnastics
- Country represented: Uruguay; (2016-)
- Head coach: Mario Daniel Martínez Serna
Medal record
Representing Uruguay
Men's artistic gymnastics
Pan American Championships
Bronze medal – third place	2016 Sucre	Floor exercise
Bronze medal – third place	2016 Sucre	Vault
South American Games
Silver medal – second place	2018 Cochabamba	Vault
South American Championships
Gold medal – first place	2016 Lima	Floor exercise
Silver medal – second place	2017 Cochabamba	Vault
Silver medal – second place	2019 Santiago	Floor exercise
Silver medal – second place	2021 San Juan	Vault
Bronze medal – third place	2016 Lima	Vault
Bronze medal – third place	2017 Cochabamba	Floor exercise

Victor Rostagno (born 4 December 1998) is an Uruguayan male artistic gymnast. He represents his nation at international competitions, including the 2016 Pan American Individual Event Artistic Gymnastics Championships. Rostagno is notable for being the first male Uruguayan gymnast to earn a medal at the Pan American Gymnastics Championships. He is also the first Uruguayan gymnast to earn a gold medal at the South American Gymnastics Championships. Both achievements were accomplished in his first year as a senior gymnast, in 2016.
