= Canada women's national artistic gymnastics team =

Canada women's national gymnastics team
- Continental union: PAGU
- National federation: Gymnastics Canada

Olympic Games
- Appearances: 10

World Championships
- Appearances: 25
- Medals: Bronze: 2022

Junior World Championships
- Appearances: 2

Pan American Championships
- Medals: Silver: 2010, 2024, 2025; Bronze: 2005, 2022, 2023, 2026

The Canada women's national artistic gymnastics team represents Canada in FIG international competitions.

== History ==
Canada has participated in the Olympic Games women's team competition 10 times, finishing as high as fifth place. The team has also made 25 appearances at the World Artistic Gymnastics Championships, winning their first team medal, a bronze, in 2022.

== Current roster ==
Name	Birthdate and age	Hometown	Club
Ellie Black	8 September 1995 (age 31)	Halifax, Nova Scotia	Halifax Alta Gymnastics
Gabrielle Black	27 February 2008 (age 18)	Oakville, Ontario	Oakville Gymnastics Club
Zoé Cadrin	2009	Laval, Quebec	WimGym
Lia-Monica Fontaine	27 September 2009 (age 17)	Salaberry-de-Valleyfield, Quebec	WimGym
Alyssa Guerrier-Calixte	19 August 2009 (age 17)	Laval, Quebec	WimGym
Maddison Hajjar	27 September 2007 (age 19)	Kirkland, Quebec	WimGym
Amy Jorgensen	6 August 2006 (age 20)	Saskatoon, Saskatchewan	Calgary Gymnastics Centre
Shallon Olsen	10 July 2000 (age 26)	Surrey, British Columbia	Flicka Gymnastics
Lia Redick	8 October 2009 (age 17)	Oakville, Ontario	Oakville Gymnastics
Ava Stewart	30 September 2005 (age 21)	Bowmanville, Ontario	Gemini Gymnastics
Aurélie Tran	25 May 2006 (age 20)	Repentigny, Quebec	Gymnix
Evandra Zlobec	21 June 2007 (age 19)	Kirkland, Quebec	WimGym

== Competitive team record ==
=== Olympic Games ===
Tournament played fully or partially on home soil

Olympic Games record
Year	Position	Squad
(Netherlands) 1928	Did not enter	
(Nazi Germany) 1936	Did not enter	
(England) 1948	Did not enter	
(Finland) 1952	Did not enter	
(Australia) 1956	Did not enter	
(Italy) 1960	Did not enter	
(Japan) 1964	Did not enter	
(Mexico) 1968	11th	Suzanne Cloutier, Jennifer Diachun, Sandra Hartley, Teresa McDonnell, Marilynn Minaker
(Germany) 1972	11th	Lise Arsenault, Susan Buchanan, Jennifer Diachun, Nancy McDonnell, Teresa McDonnell, Sharon Tsukamoto
(Canada) 1976	9th	Lise Arsenault, Karen Kelsall, Nancy McDonnell, Teresa McDonnell, Kelly Muncey, Patti Rope
(Soviet Union) 1980	Qualified, later withdrew	
(United States) 1984	5th	Anita Botnen, Kelly Brown, Andrea Thomas, Jessica Tudos, Bonnie Wittmeier, Gigi Zosa
(South Korea) 1988	11th	Monica Covacci, Cathy Giancaspro, Larissa Lowing, Christina McDonald, Janine Rankin, Lori Strong
(Spain) 1992	10th	Mylène Fleury, Janet Morin, Janine Rankin, Lori Strong, Stella Umeh, Jennifer Wood
(United States) 1996	Did not qualify	
(Australia) 2000	9th	Julie Beaulieu, Michelle Conway, Crystal Gilmore, Lise Leveille, Kate Richardson, Yvonne Tousek
(Greece) 2004	10th	Melanie Banville, Gael Mackie, Amelie Plante, Heather Purnell, Kate Richardson, Kylie Stone
(China) 2008	Did not qualify	
(England) 2012	5th	Ellie Black, Victoria Moors, Dominique Pegg, Brittany Rogers, Kristina Vaculik
(Brazil) 2016	9th	Ellie Black, Shallon Olsen, Isabela Onyshko, Brittany Rogers, Rose-Kaying Woo
(Japan) 2020	10th	Ellie Black, Brooklyn Moors, Shallon Olsen, Ava Stewart
(France) 2024	5th	Ellie Black, Cassie Lee, Shallon Olsen, Ava Stewart, Aurélie Tran
Total	Fifth place	—N/a

=== World Championships ===
Year	Position	Squad
1962	16th place	Gail Daley, Bonnie Dertell, Irene Haworth, Leissa Krol, Maureen McDonald, Lynne Wozniak
1966	15th place	Elsbeth Austin, Leslie Bird, Suzanne Cloutier, Sandra Hartley, Irene Haworth, Marilynn Minaker
1970	13th place	Lise Arsenault, Susan Buchanan, Jennifer Diachun, Sandra Hartley, Nancy McDonnell, Teresa McDonnell
1974	11th place	Lise Arsenault, Jennifer Diachun, Nancy McDonnell, Teresa McDonnell, Patti Rope, Sharon Tsukamoto
1978	8th place	Monica Goermann, Sherry Hawco, Karen Kelsall, Elfi Schlegel
1979	10th place	Carmen Alie, Diane Carnegie, Shannon Fleming, Monica Goermann, Elfi Schlegel, Ellen Stewart
1981	10th place	Sara Aggiss, Anita Botnen, Anne Marie Deserres, Leanne Gallant, Elfi Schlegel, Bonnie Wittmeier
1983	10th place	Anita Botnen, Leanne Gallant, Janice Kerr, Elfi Schlegel, Andrea Thomas, Bonnie Wittmeier
1985	9th place	Sandra Botnen, Cathy Giancaspro, Sasha Ivanochko, Christina McDonald, Andrea Owoc, Andrea Thomas
1987	8th place	Monica Covacci, Cathy Giancaspro, Larissa Lowing, Christina McDonald, Janine Rankin, Lori Strong
1989	6th place	Monica Covacci, Leah Homma, Kerri Kanuka, Larissa Lowing, Lori Strong
1991	12th place	Janet Morin, Koyuki Oka, Sarah Rainey, Janine Rankin, Lori Strong, Stella Umeh
1994	10th place	Marilou Cousineau, Lena Degteva, Jennifer Exaltacion, Jaime Hill, Eve-Marie Poulin, Lisa Simes, Theresa Wolf
1995	15th place	Stephanie Cappuccitti, Marilou Cousineau, Lena Degteva, Jennifer Exaltacion, Shanyn MacEachern, Yvonne Tousek, Theresa Wolf
1997	8th place	Sarah Deegan, Veronique Leclerc, Shanyn MacEachern, Katie McAvoy, Katie Rowland, Yvonne Tousek
1999	10th place	Julie Beaulieu, Michelle Conway, Emilie Fournier, Lise Leveille, Kate Richardson, Yvonne Tousek
2001	10th place	Crystal Gilmore, Joelle Ouellette, Ashley Peckett, Amelie Plante, Kate Richardson, Jennifer Simbhudas
2003	11th place	Melanie Banville, Amelie Plante, Heather Purnell, Richelle Simpson, Kylie Stone, Lydia Williams
2006	14th place	Marci Bernholtz, Alyssa Brown, Crystal Gilmore, Brittnee Habbib, Elyse Hopfner-Hibbs, Rebecca Simbhudas
2007	14th place	Marci Bernholtz, Alyssa Brown, Nansy Damianova, Elyse Hopfner-Hibbs, Sydney Sawa, Kristina Vaculik
2010	13th place	Bianca Dancose-Giambattisto, Coralie Leblond-Chartrand, Charlotte Mackie, Dominique Pegg, Jessica Savona, Kristina Vaculik
2011	11th place	Talia Chiarelli, Madeline Gardiner, Mikaela Gerber, Coralie Leblond-Chartrand, Christine 'Peng Peng' Lee, Dominique Pegg
2014	12th place	Ellie Black, Maegan Chant, Isabela Onyshko, Kirsten Peterman, Victoria-Kayen Woo, Aleeza Yu
2015	6th place	Ellie Black, Isabela Onyshko, Brittany Rogers, Audrey Rousseau, Sydney Townsend, Victoria-Kayen Woo
2018	4th place	Ellie Black, Sophie Marois, Brooklyn Moors, Shallon Olsen, Ana Padurariu
2019	7th place	Ellie Black, Brooklyn Moors, Shallon Olsen, Ana Padurariu, Victoria-Kayen Woo
2022	Bronze medal	Ellie Black, Laurie Denommée, Denelle Pedrick, Emma Spence, Sydney Turner, Shallon Olsen
2023	12th place	Ellie Black, Cassie Lee, Ava Stewart, Aurélie Tran, Rose-Kaying Woo
2026	8th place	Ellie Black, Gabrielle Black, Coralie Demers, Lia-Monica Fontaine, Lia Redick, Zoe Tsaprailis

=== Junior World Championships ===
Year	Position	Squad
2019	12th place	Okeri Katjivari, Cassie Lee, Clara Raposo
2023	4th place	Cristella Brunetti-Burns, Victoriane Charron, Zoe Tsaprailis
2025	12th place	Coralie Demers, Aila McKinley, Maryam Saber

== Most decorated gymnasts ==
This list includes all Canadian female artistic gymnasts who have won a medal at the Olympic Games or the World Artistic Gymnastics Championships.

Rank	Gymnast	Team	AA	VT	UB	BB	FX	Olympic Total	World Total	Total
1	Ellie Black	2022	2017			2022		0	3	3
2	Shallon Olsen	2022		2018				0	2	2
3	Lia Monica Fontaine			2025				0	1	1
3	Ana Padurariu					2018		0	1	1
5	Elyse Hopfner-Hibbs					2006		0	1	1
5	Laurie Denommée	2022						0	1	1
5	Denelle Pedrick	2022						0	1	1
5	Emma Spence	2022						0	1	1
5	Sydney Turner	2022						0	1	1

== See also ==
- List of Olympic female artistic gymnasts for Canada
- Canada men's national artistic gymnastics team
