= List of Olympic female artistic gymnasts for Canada =

Gymnastics events have been staged at the Olympic Games since 1896. Canadian female gymnasts have participated in every Summer Olympics since 1956, except for 1980. A total of 56 female gymnasts have represented Canada. Canadian women have not won any medals at the Olympics. Teresa McDonnell, Ellie Black, and Shallon Olsen are the only Canadian female gymnasts who have competed in at least three Olympics, with Black having represented Canada at four.

== Gymnasts ==
=== Summer Olympics ===
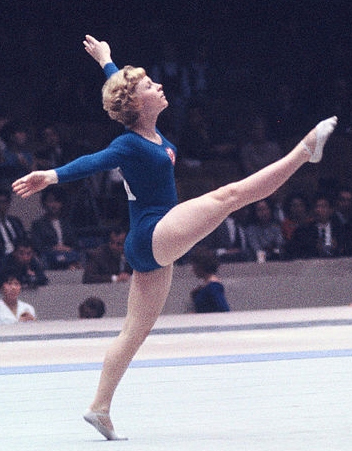
Gail Daley

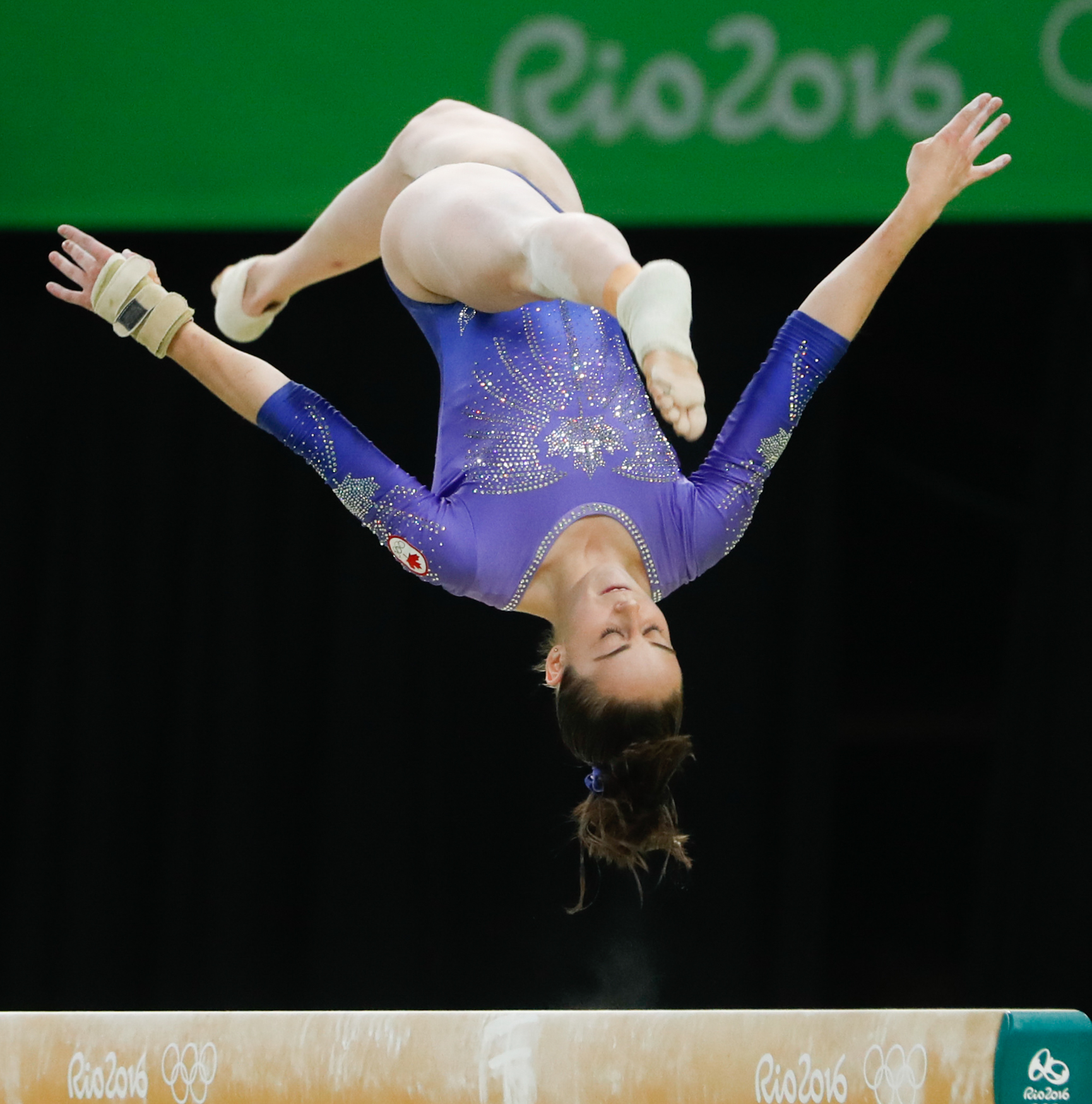
Isabela Onyshko at the 2016 Olympic Games.

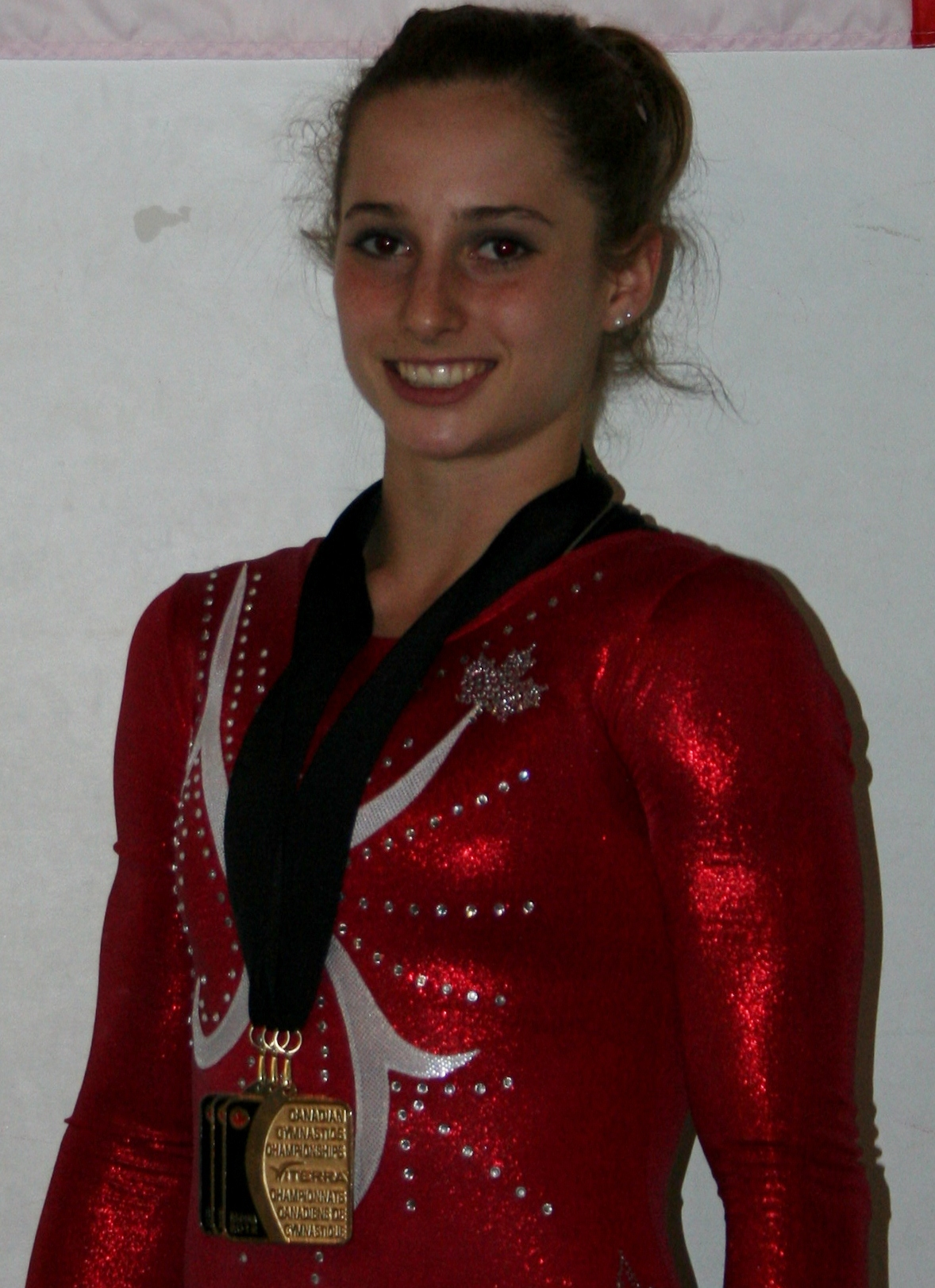
Kristina Vaculik

Gymnast	Years	Ref.
Lise Arsenault-Goertz	1972, 1976	
Melanie Banville	2004	
Julie Beaulieu	2000	
Ellie Black	2012, 2016, 2020, 2024	
Anita Botnen	1984	
Kelly Brown	1984	
Susan Buchanan	1972	
Suzanne Cloutier	1968	
Michelle Conway	2000	
Monica Covacci	1988	
Gail Daley	1964	
Nansy Damianova	2008	
Jennifer Diachun	1968, 1972	
Jennifer Exaltacion	1996	
Mylène Fleury	1992	
Cathy Giancaspro	1988	
Crystal Gilmore	2000	
Sandra Hartley	1968	
Elyse Hopfner-Hibbs	2008	
Karen Kelsall	1976	
Cassie Lee	2024	
Lise Leveille	2000	
Larissa Lowing	1988	
Shanyn MacEachern	1996	
Gael Mackie	2004	
Christina McDonald	1988	
Nancy McDonnell	1972, 1976	
Teresa McDonnell	1968, 1972, 1976	
Marilynn Minaker	1968	
Brooklyn Moors	2020	
Victoria Moors	2012	
Janet Morin	1992	
Kelly Muncey	1976	
Shallon Olsen	2016, 2020, 2024	
Isabela Onyshko	2016	
Louise Parker	1960	
Dominique Pegg	2012	
Amelie Plante	2004	
Heather Purnell	2004	
Janine Rankin	1988, 1992	
Kate Richardson	2000, 2004	
Brittany Rogers	2012, 2016	
Patti Rope	1976	
Ernestine Russell	1956, 1960	
Ava Stewart	2020, 2024	
Kylie Stone	2004	
Lori Strong	1988, 1992	
Andrea Thomas	1984	
Yvonne Tousek	1996, 2000	
Aurélie Tran	2024	
Sharon Tsukamoto	1972	
Jessica Tudos	1984	
Stella Umeh	1992	
Kristina Vaculik	2012	
Bonnie Wittmeier	1984	
Rose-Kaying Woo	2016	
Jennifer Wood	1992	
Gigi Zosa	1984	

=== Youth Olympic Games ===
Gymnast	Years	Ref.
Madeline Gardiner	2010	
Sydney Townsend	2014	
Emma Spence	2018	
Taya Macey	2026	
Maryam Saber	2026	
Nikita Théodat	2026	
