= 2012 Pacific Rim Gymnastics Championships – Women's Artistic Gymnastics =

The women's artistic gymnastics competition at the 2012 Pacific Rim Gymnastics Championships was held on March 16 and 18, 2012, at the Comcast Arena and Comcast Community Ice Rink in Everett, Washington.

== Team final ==
| Rank | Team | Vault (gymnastics) | Uneven bars | Balance beam | Floor (gymnastics) | Total |
|---|---|---|---|---|---|---|
| 1st place, gold medalist(s) | United States | 60.700 | 60.400 | 60.750 | 57.850 | 239.700 |
| 1st place, gold medalist(s) | Jordyn Wieber | 15.700 | 15.000 | 15.700 | 14.650 | 239.700 |
| 1st place, gold medalist(s) | Katelyn Ohashi | 14.850 | 14.650 | 15.850 | 14.650 | 239.700 |
| 1st place, gold medalist(s) | Kyla Ross | | 15.250 | 15.000 | 14.100 | 239.700 |
| 1st place, gold medalist(s) | Lexie Priessman | 15.300 | | 14.200 | | 239.700 |
| 1st place, gold medalist(s) | Amelia Hundley | 14.950 | | | 14.450 | 239.700 |
| 1st place, gold medalist(s) | Gabby Douglas | | 15.500 | | | 239.700 |
| 2nd place, silver medalist(s) | China | 53.150 | 54.650 | 58.100 | 54.750 | 220.650 |
| 2nd place, silver medalist(s) | Luo Peiru | 13.200 | 13.950 | 14.500 | 13.850 | 220.650 |
| 2nd place, silver medalist(s) | Tan Sixin | 13.200 | 13.450 | 14.050 | 13.900 | 220.650 |
| 2nd place, silver medalist(s) | Shang Chunsong | 13.300 | 13.650 | 15.250 | | 220.650 |
| 2nd place, silver medalist(s) | Lou Nina | 13.450 | | 14.300 | 13.850 | 220.650 |
| 2nd place, silver medalist(s) | Mei Jie | | 13.600 | | 13.450 | 220.650 |
| 2nd place, silver medalist(s) | Wang Wei | | | | | 220.650 |
| 3rd place, bronze medalist(s) | Canada | 55.150 | 55.350 | 53.300 | 55.200 | 219.000 |
| 3rd place, bronze medalist(s) | Christine Peng-Peng Lee | 13.950 | 14.550 | 14.950 | 14.350 | 219.000 |
| 3rd place, bronze medalist(s) | Victoria Moors | 14.500 | 13.550 | | 14.750 | 219.000 |
| 3rd place, bronze medalist(s) | Kristina Vaculik | | 14.200 | 14.200 | 13.450 | 219.000 |
| 3rd place, bronze medalist(s) | Jordyn Pedersen | 13.450 | | | 12.650 | 219.000 |
| 3rd place, bronze medalist(s) | Victoria-Kayen Woo | | 13.050 | 12.100 | | 219.000 |
| 3rd place, bronze medalist(s) | Maegan Chant | 13.750 | | | | 219.000 |
| 4 | Australia | 55.300 | 49.600 | 53.350 | 56.250 | 214.500 |
| 4 | Emily Little | 14.500 | 13.250 | 13.400 | 14.150 | 214.500 |
| 4 | Lauren Mitchell | 13.850 | | 14.800 | 14.850 | 214.500 |
| 4 | Jazminne Casis | 13.400 | | 12.700 | 13.450 | 214.500 |
| 4 | Alexandra Eade | 13.550 | 12.200 | | 13.800 | 214.500 |
| 4 | Madelaine Leydin | | 12.100 | 12.750 | | 214.500 |
| 4 | Georgia Simpson | | | | | 214.500 |
| 5 | Japan | 53.600 | 51.800 | 54.200 | 52.950 | 212.550 |
| 5 | Sakura Yumoto | 13.450 | 13.250 | 13.500 | 13.400 | 212.550 |
| 5 | Yuri Ishi | 13.300 | 13.050 | 13.600 | 12.950 | 212.550 |
| 5 | Yuki Uchiyama | 13.600 | | 13.450 | 13.600 | 212.550 |
| 5 | Risa Konishi | 13.250 | 12.400 | 13.650 | | 212.550 |
| 5 | Wakiko Ryu | | 13.100 | | 13.000 | 212.550 |
| 6 | Russia | 53.650 | 51.150 | 51.500 | 54.200 | 210.500 |
| 6 | Ekaterina Baturina | 13.200 | 12.600 | 12.900 | 13.650 | 210.500 |
| 6 | Maria Kharenkova | 13.700 | | 14.000 | 13.900 | 210.500 |
| 6 | Anastasia Belova | 13.400 | 12.500 | | 13.200 | 210.500 |
| 6 | Anastasia Marchuk | | 12.600 | 12.800 | 13.450 | 210.500 |
| 6 | Maria Stepanova | 13.350 | | 11.800 | | 210.500 |
| 6 | Diana Elkina | | 13.450 | | | 210.500 |
| 7 | New Zealand | 49.100 | 40.100 | 47.550 | 49.000 | 185.750 |
| 7 | Charlotte Sullivan | 13.000 | 11.400 | 13.400 | 12.500 | 185.750 |
| 7 | Rebecca Morrison | 12.150 | 8.750 | 12.650 | | 185.750 |
| 7 | Millie Williamson | | 9.850 | 11.350 | 12.250 | 185.750 |
| 7 | Hanna Malloch | | 10.100 | 10.150 | 12.150 | 185.750 |
| 7 | Courtney McGregor | 12.100 | | | 12.100 | 185.750 |
| 7 | Tara Purvis | 12.050 | | | | 185.750 |
| 8 | Mexico | 50.700 | 37.000 | 45.750 | 46.050 | 179.500 |
| 8 | Sandra García | | 10.450 | 10.600 | 12.000 | 179.500 |
| 8 | Karla Martínez | 12.650 | 10.000 | | 10.850 | 179.500 |
| 8 | Shaden Michelle Cortes | 12.850 | 7.400 | 12.300 | 11.950 | 179.500 |
| 8 | Andrea Mora | 12.500 | 9.150 | 11.250 | | 179.500 |
| 8 | Federica Scheiman | 12.700 | | 11.600 | 11.250 | 179.500 |

== Seniors ==
=== All-around ===
| Rank | Gymnast | Vault (gymnastics) | Uneven bars | Balance beam | Floor (gymnastics) | Total |
|---|---|---|---|---|---|---|
| 1st place, gold medalist(s) | Jordyn Wieber (USA) | 15.700 | 15.000 | 15.700 | 14.650 | 61.050 |
| 2nd place, silver medalist(s) | Kyla Ross (USA) | 14.850 | 15.250 | 15.000 | 14.100 | 59.200 |
| 3rd place, bronze medalist(s) | Christine Peng-Peng Lee (CAN) | 13.950 | 14.550 | 14.950 | 14.350 | 57.800 |
| 4 | Luo Peiru (CHN) | 13.200 | 13.950 | 14.500 | 13.850 | 55.500 |
| 5 | Shang Chunsong (CHN) | 13.300 | 13.650 | 15.250 | 13.150 | 55.350 |
| 6 | Emily Little (AUS) | 14.500 | 13.250 | 13.400 | 14.150 | 55.300 |
| 7 | Kristina Vaculik (CAN) | 13.250 | 14.200 | 14.200 | 13.450 | 55.100 |
| 8 | Yuri Ishi (JPN) | 13.300 | 13.050 | 13.600 | 12.950 | 52.900 |
| 9 | Anastasia Marchuk (RUS) | 13.150 | 12.600 | 12.800 | 13.450 | 52.000 |
| 10 | Risa Konishi (JPN) | 13.250 | 12.400 | 13.650 | 12.250 | 51.550 |
| 11 | Bibiana Vélez (COL) | 13.400 | 12.700 | 11.950 | 12.700 | 50.750 |
| 12 | Yurany Avendaño (COL) | 12.800 | 12.300 | 11.550 | 11.850 | 48.500 |
| 13 | Wong Hiu Ying Angel (HKG) | 13.550 | 10.700 | 12.700 | 11.100 | 48.100 |
| 14 | Karina Regidor (CRC) | 12.950 | 11.250 | 11.200 | 12.350 | 47.750 |
| 15 | Chen Yu Chun (TPE) | 12.850 | 10.000 | 11.900 | 11.650 | 46.400 |
| 16 | Sandra García (MEX) | 12.150 | 10.450 | 10.600 | 12.000 | 45.200 |
| 17 | Lauren Mitchell (AUS) | 13.850 | - | 14.800 | 14.850 | 43.500 |
| 18 | Tsai Chia Jung (TPE) | 12.400 | 8.500 | 12.150 | 10.050 | 43.100 |
| 19 | Karla Martínez (MEX) | 12.650 | 10.000 | 9.500 | 10.850 | 43.000 |
| 20 | Maria Stepanova (RUS) | 13.350 | - | 11.800 | 12.950 | 38.100 |
| 21 | Leung Ka Man (HKG) | 12.000 | 6.800 | 8.450 | 10.600 | 37.850 |

=== Vault ===
| Rank | Gymnast | D Score | E Score | Pen. | Score 1 | D Score | E Score | Pen. | Score 2 | Total |
|---|---|---|---|---|---|---|---|---|---|---|
| 1st place, gold medalist(s) | Wakiko Ryu (JPN) | 5.8 | 8.725 | | 14.525 | 5.0 | 8.600 | | 13.600 | 14.062 |
| 2nd place, silver medalist(s) | Wong Hiu Ying Angel (HKG) | 5.2 | 8.750 | | 13.950 | 5.0 | 8.800 | | 13.800 | 13.875 |
| 3rd place, bronze medalist(s) | Risa Konishi (JPN) | 5.2 | 8.575 | | 13.775 | 5.0 | 8.400 | | 13.400 | 13.587 |
| 4 | Chen Yu Chun (TPE) | 5.0 | 8.425 | | 13.425 | 5.0 | 7.025 | | 12.025 | 12.725 |
| 5 | Leung Ka Man (HKG) | 4.4 | 8.350 | | 12.750 | 4.2 | 8.425 | | 12.625 | 12.687 |
| 6 | Tsai Chia Jung (TPE) | 4.2 | 8.425 | | 12.625 | 4.4 | 7.250 | | 11.650 | 12.137 |

=== Uneven bars ===
| Rank | Gymnast | D Score | E Score | Pen. | Total |
|---|---|---|---|---|---|
| 1st place, gold medalist(s) | Gabby Douglas (USA) | 6.4 | 8.750 | | 15.150 |
| 2nd place, silver medalist(s) | Kyla Ross (USA) | 6.2 | 8.850 | | 15.050 |
| 3rd place, bronze medalist(s) | Luo Peiru (CHN) | 6.5 | 8.200 | | 14.700 |
| 4 | Peng-Peng Lee (CAN) | 5.7 | 8.900 | | 14.600 |
| 4 | Shang Chunsong (CHN) | 6.5 | 8.100 | | 14.600 |
| 6 | Emily Little (AUS) | 5.4 | 8.200 | | 13.600 |
| 6 | Kristina Vaculik (CAN) | 5.8 | 7.800 | | 13.600 |
| 8 | Wakiko Ryu (JPN) | 4.9 | 7.800 | | 12.700 |

=== Balance beam ===
| Rank | Gymnast | D Score | E Score | Pen. | Total |
|---|---|---|---|---|---|
| 1st place, gold medalist(s) | Kyla Ross (USA) | 6.2 | 9.175 | | 15.375 |
| 2nd place, silver medalist(s) | Peng-Peng Lee (CAN) | 6.4 | 8.900 | | 15.300 |
| 3rd place, bronze medalist(s) | Tan Sixin (CHN) | 6.3 | 8.750 | | 15.050 |
| 4 | Shang Chunsong (CHN) | 5.7 | 8.175 | | 13.875 |
| 5 | Lauren Mitchell (AUS) | 6.2 | 7.550 | | 13.750 |
| 6 | Jordyn Wieber (USA) | 6.0 | 7.700 | | 13.700 |
| 7 | Kristina Vaculik (CAN) | 5.6 | 7.225 | | 12.825 |
| 8 | Risa Konishi (JPN) | 5.4 | 7.200 | | 12.600 |

=== Floor ===
| Rank | Gymnast | D Score | E Score | Pen. | Total |
|---|---|---|---|---|---|
| 1st place, gold medalist(s) | Jordyn Wieber (USA) | 6.1 | 9.025 | | 15.125 |
| 2nd place, silver medalist(s) | Peng-Peng Lee (CAN) | 5.7 | 8.875 | | 14.575 |
| 3rd place, bronze medalist(s) | Kyla Ross (USA) | 5.6 | 8.775 | | 14.375 |
| 4 | Luo Peiru (CHN) | 5.2 | 8.825 | | 14.025 |
| 5 | Lauren Mitchell (AUS) | 5.9 | 7.550 | | 13.450 |
| 6 | Victoria Moors (CAN) | 5.8 | 7.450 | | 13.250 |
| 7 | Tan Sixin (CHN) | 5.8 | 7.400 | | 13.200 |
| 8 | Emily Little (AUS) | 5.3 | 7.800 | | 13.100 |

== Juniors ==
=== All-around ===
| Rank | Gymnast | Vault (gymnastics) | Uneven bars | Balance beam | Floor (gymnastics) | Total |
|---|---|---|---|---|---|---|
| 1st place, gold medalist(s) | Katelyn Ohashi (USA) | 14.850 | 14.650 | 15.850 | 14.650 | 60.000 |
| 2nd place, silver medalist(s) | Lexie Priessman (USA) | 15.300 | 14.300 | 14.200 | 14.000 | 57.800 |
| 3rd place, bronze medalist(s) | Sakura Yumoto (JPN) | 13.450 | 13.250 | 13.500 | 13.400 | 53.600 |
| 4 | Maria Kharenkova (RUS) | 13.700 | 11.350 | 14.000 | 13.900 | 52.950 |
| 5 | Ekaterina Baturina (RUS) | 13.200 | 12.600 | 12.900 | 13.650 | 52.350 |
| 6 | Yuki Uchiyama (JPN) | 13.600 | 11.100 | 13.450 | 13.600 | 51.750 |
| 7 | Jazminne Casis (AUS) | 13.400 | 12.050 | 12.700 | 13.450 | 51.600 |
| 8 | Victoria Kayen Woo (CAN) | 13.250 | 13.050 | 12.100 | 12.600 | 51.000 |
| 9 | Charlotte Sullivan (NZL) | 13.000 | 11.400 | 13.400 | 12.500 | 50.300 |
| 10 | Jordyn Pedersen (CAN) | 13.450 | 12.550 | 11.600 | 12.650 | 50.250 |
| 11 | Alexandra Eade (AUS) | 13.550 | 12.200 | 10.350 | 13.800 | 49.900 |
| 12 | Rebecca Morrison (NZL) | 12.150 | 8.750 | 12.650 | 11.750 | 45.300 |
| 13 | Valentina Brostella (PAN) | 12.050 | 8.850 | 12.100 | 11.550 | 44.550 |
| 14 | Shaden Michelle Cortes (MEX) | 12.850 | 7.400 | 12.300 | 11.950 | 44.500 |
| 15 | Andrea Mora (MEX) | 12.500 | 9.150 | 11.250 | 10.350 | 43.250 |
| 16 | Ana Victoria de León (PAN) | 12.300 | 8.350 | 11.400 | 11.050 | 43.100 |
| 17 | Lou Nina (CHN) | 13.450 | - | 14.300 | 13.850 | 41.600 |
| 18 | Mei Jie (CHN) | - | 13.600 | 13.650 | 13.450 | 40.700 |
| 19 | Lai Yu Chun (TPE) | 12.000 | 8.400 | 10.350 | 9.300 | 40.050 |
| 20 | Chen Wan Yin (TPE) | 12.050 | 6.750 | 6.650 | 9.100 | 34.550 |
| 21 | Angela Arce (CRC) | 11.000 | 4.100 | 9.000 | 9.200 | 33.300 |

=== Vault ===
| Rank | Gymnast | D Score | E Score | Pen. | Total |
|---|---|---|---|---|---|
| 1st place, gold medalist(s) | Lexie Priessman (USA) | 6.5 | 8.925 | 0.1 | 15.325 |
| 2nd place, silver medalist(s) | Amelia Hundley (USA) | 5.8 | 9.025 | | 14.825 |
| 3rd place, bronze medalist(s) | Maegan Chant (CAN) | 5.2 | 8.725 | | 13.925 |
| 4 | Maria Kharenkova (RUS) | 5.0 | 8.550 | | 13.550 |
| 5 | Jordyn Pedersen (CAN) | 5.0 | 8.525 | | 13.525 |
| 5 | Yuki Uchiyama (JPN) | 5.0 | 8.525 | | 13.525 |
| 7 | Alexandra Eade (AUS) | 5.0 | 8.500 | | 13.500 |
| 8 | Sakura Yumoto (JPN) | 5.0 | 8.250 | | 13.250 |

=== Uneven bars ===
| Rank | Gymnast | D Score | E Score | Pen. | Total |
|---|---|---|---|---|---|
| 1st place, gold medalist(s) | Katelyn Ohashi (USA) | 6.0 | 8.625 | | 14.625 |
| 2nd place, silver medalist(s) | Victoria Kayen Woo (CAN) | 5.1 | 8.000 | | 13.100 |
| 3rd place, bronze medalist(s) | Sakura Yumoto (JPN) | 5.1 | 7.775 | | 12.875 |
| 4 | Lexie Priessman (USA) | 5.0 | 7.350 | | 12.350 |
| 5 | Ekaterina Baturina (RUS) | 4.9 | 7.200 | | 12.100 |
| 5 | Anastasia Belova (RUS) | 5.1 | 7.000 | | 12.100 |
| 7 | Jordyn Pedersen (CAN) | 5.0 | 6.475 | | 11.475 |
| 8 | Mei Jie (CHN) | 3.2 | 6.275 | | 9.475 |

=== Balance beam ===
| Rank | Gymnast | D Score | E Score | Pen. | Total |
|---|---|---|---|---|---|
| 1st place, gold medalist(s) | Katelyn Ohashi (USA) | 6.4 | 8.875 | | 15.275 |
| 2nd place, silver medalist(s) | Lou Nina (CHN) | 6.2 | 8.500 | | 14.700 |
| 3rd place, bronze medalist(s) | Maria Kharenkova (RUS) | 5.5 | 8.525 | | 14.025 |
| 4 | Sakura Yumoto (JPN) | 4.8 | 8.525 | | 13.325 |
| 5 | Yuki Uchiyama (JPN) | 5.4 | 7.175 | | 12.575 |
| 6 | Lexie Priessman (USA) | 5.3 | 7.200 | | 12.500 |
| 7 | Mei Jie (CHN) | 5.5 | 5.925 | | 11.425 |
| 8 | Charlotte Sullivan (NZL) | 4.9 | 5.400 | | 10.300 |

=== Floor ===
| Rank | Gymnast | D Score | E Score | Pen. | Total |
|---|---|---|---|---|---|
| 1st place, gold medalist(s) | Katelyn Ohashi (USA) | 6.0 | 8.950 | | 14.950 |
| 2nd place, silver medalist(s) | Amelia Hundley (USA) | 5.7 | 8.600 | | 14.300 |
| 3rd place, bronze medalist(s) | Maria Kharenkova (RUS) | 5.4 | 8.550 | | 13.950 |
| 4 | Yuki Uchiyama (JPN) | 5.4 | 8.500 | | 13.900 |
| 5 | Alexandra Eade (AUS) | 5.3 | 8.425 | | 13.725 |
| 6 | Lou Nina (CHN) | 5.3 | 8.125 | | 13.425 |
| 7 | Ekaterina Baturina (RUS) | 5.1 | 8.075 | | 13.175 |
| 8 | Mei Jie (CHN) | 4.3 | 8.150 | | 12.450 |
