= Ekaterina Baturina =

Ekaterina Baturina may refer to:

- Ekaterina Baturina (gymnast) (born 1997), Russian artistic gymnast
- Ekaterina Baturina (luger) (born 1992), Russian luge competitor
