= Casis =

Casis or Casís is a surname. Notable people with this name include:

- Ana Casís, Panamanian sociologist, statistician, and demographer
- Jazminne Casis, Australian gymnast in 2012 Pacific Rim Gymnastics Championships – Women's Artistic Gymnastics
- Julio Súmar Casis (born 1931), Peruvian chess player
- Luis Casis, Panamanian politician, vice-presidential candidate in 2019 Panamanian general election
- Tomasa Ester Casís (1878–1962), Panamanian teacher and women's rights activist

== See also ==
- Center for the Advancement of Science in Space (CASIS), managing organization for the International Space Station
