= 2008 Pacific Rim Gymnastics Championships =

International gymnastics competition

- Location: San Jose, California
- Dates: March 28–30, 2008

The 2008 Pacific Rim Championships were held in San Jose, California, from March 28–30. Four disciplines of gymnastics were contested: women's artistic, men's artistic, rhythmic, and trampolining.

== Medal winners ==
=== Men ===
Event	Gold	Silver	Bronze
Team	United States	China	Japan
Seniors
All-Around	Paul Hamm (USA)	Alexander Artemev (USA)	Bo Lu (CHN)
Floor Exercise	Brandon O'Neill (CAN)	Paul Hamm (USA)	Maxsim Deviatovsky (RUS)
Pommel Horse	Paul Hamm (USA)	Bo Lu (CHN)	Heng Wang (CHN)
Rings	Bo Lu (CHN)	Yury Riazanov (RUS)	Maxsim Deviatovsky (RUS)
Vault	Mingsheng Liang (CHN)	Yusuke Saito (JPN)	James Brochero (COL) Aldo Torres (MEX)
Parallel Bars	Paul Hamm (USA) Heng Wang (CHN)	—N/a	Maxsim Deviatovsky (RUS) Mingsheng Liang (CHN)
Horizontal Bar	Philippe Rizzo (AUS)	Yury Riazanov (RUS)	Paul Hamm (USA)
Juniors
All-Around	Danell Leyva (USA)	Igor Pakhomenko (RUS)	Genki Takeshita (JPN)
Floor Exercise	Riku Munakata (JPN)	Genki Takeshita (JPN)	Igor Pakhomenko (RUS)
Pommel Horse	Genki Takeshita (JPN)	Igor Pakhomenko (RUS)	Mathew Curtis (AUS)
Rings	Zhanteng Liu (CHN)	Hiroyuki Imai (JPN)	David Belyavskiy (RUS)
Vault	Shek Wai Hung (HKG)	Riku Munakata (JPN)	Chen Xuezhang (CHN)
Parallel Bars	Fang Lixiang (CHN)	Chen Xuezhang (CHN)	Danell Leyva (USA)
Horizontal Bar	Igor Pakhomenko (RUS)	Glen Ishino (USA)	Genki Takeshita (JPN)

=== Women ===
Event	Gold	Silver	Bronze
Team	United States	Canada	China
Seniors
All-Around	Nastia Liukin (USA)	Jana Bieger (USA)	Daria Joura (AUS)
Vault	Anna Myzdrikova (RUS)	Jessica Gil (COL)	Ericka García (MEX)
Uneven Bars	Jana Bieger (USA)	Kristina Vaculik (CAN); Nastia Liukin (USA)	
Balance Beam	Nastia Liukin (USA)	Huang Qiushuang (CHN)	Jana Bieger (USA)
Floor	Darlene Hill (USA)	Daria Joura (AUS)	Anna Myzdrikova (RUS)
Juniors
All-Around	Rebecca Bross (USA)	Samantha Shapiro (USA)	Viktoria Komova (RUS)
Vault	Rebecca Bross (USA)	Erica Lynn Danko (JPN)	Brittany Rogers (CAN)
Uneven Bars	Samantha Shapiro (USA)	Peng-Peng Lee (CAN)	Brittany Rogers (CAN)
Balance Beam	Cui Jie (CHN); Rebecca Bross (USA)		Huang Ying (CHN)
Floor	Rebecca Bross (USA)	Nailya Mustafina (RUS); Shizuka Tozawa (JPN)	

== Detail results ==
=== Team ===
Rank	Team	Vault (gymnastics)	Uneven bars	Balance beam	Floor (gymnastics)	Total
1st place, gold medalist(s)	United States	59.750	61.900	63.550	60.075	245.275
1st place, gold medalist(s)	Nastia Liukin	15.000	16.650	16.400	14.800	245.275
1st place, gold medalist(s)	Rebecca Bross	14.800	15.000	15.900	15.350	245.275
1st place, gold medalist(s)	Jana Bieger	15.050	15.025		14.800	245.275
1st place, gold medalist(s)	Samantha Shapiro		15.225	15.800		245.275
1st place, gold medalist(s)	Darlene Hill	14.900			15.125	245.275
1st place, gold medalist(s)	Rebecca Clark			15.450		245.275
2nd place, silver medalist(s)	Canada	58.050	56.500	60.900	58.025	233.475
2nd place, silver medalist(s)	Nansy Damianova	14.650	14.650		14.600	233.475
2nd place, silver medalist(s)	Brittany Rogers	14.550	13.600	14.950		233.475
2nd place, silver medalist(s)	Kristina Vaculik		14.275	15.800	14.350	233.475
2nd place, silver medalist(s)	Charlotte Mackie	14.700		15.200	14.525	233.475
2nd place, silver medalist(s)	Christine Peng-Peng Lee	14.150	13.975		14.550	233.475
2nd place, silver medalist(s)	Elyse Hopfner-Hibbs			14.950		233.475
3rd place, bronze medalist(s)	China	57.000	55.700	62.200	58.175	233.075
3rd place, bronze medalist(s)	Huang Qiushuang	14.200	13.975	16.050	14.625	233.075
3rd place, bronze medalist(s)	Cui Jie	14.200		15.200	14.425	233.075
3rd place, bronze medalist(s)	Zhang Xin	13.950	13.350		14.625	233.075
3rd place, bronze medalist(s)	Huang Ying			15.750	14.500	233.075
3rd place, bronze medalist(s)	Guan Wenli		14.100	15.350		233.075
3rd place, bronze medalist(s)	Tian Mengsi	14.650	14.275			233.075
4	Australia	56.800	56.675	61.100	58.100	232.675
4	Dasha Joura	13.950	15.000	15.150	15.100	232.675
4	Ashleigh Brennan	14.550	13.975	15.800	14.700	232.675
4	Lauren Mitchell		14.550	15.050	14.550	232.675
4	Britt Greeley	13.850	13.150	15.100		232.675
4	Emily Little	14.450			13.750	232.675
5	Russia	57.250	55.725	58.700	58.725	230.250
5	Viktoria Komova	14.550	13.225	14.650	15.175	230.250
5	Alena Zmeu	14.000	14.175	14.500	13.900	230.250
5	Violetta Malikova	13.750	13.525	13.850		230.250
5	Ludmila Ezhova		14.800	15.700		230.250
5	Anna Myzdrikova	14.950			14.900	230.250
5	Nailya Mustafina				14.600	230.250
6	Japan	56.400	43.225	57.950	57.350	224.925
6	Shizuka Tozawa	14.150	12.950	14.600	14.525	224.925
6	Erica Lynn Danko	14.750	13.075	13.950	14.275	224.925
6	Nanaho Hidaka	13.750		14.950	14.050	224.925
6	Chinami Otaki	13.750	13.975	14.450		224.925
6	Akiho Sato		13.225		14.500	224.925
7	Mexico	54.450	49.625	57.150	53.100	214.325
7	Ericka García	14.600	13.350	14.650	13.400	214.325
7	Marisela Cantú	13.800	12.950	14.950	13.475	214.325
7	Karla Salazar	13.200	12.025	14.050	13.925	214.325
7	Paula Martínez	12.850		13.500		214.325
7	Daniela Espinosa		11.300		12.300	214.325
8	Chinese Taipei	52.650	38.250	49.900	50.600	191.400
8	Chen Chun Min	12.600	9.350	12.200	12.575	191.400
8	Chen Yu Chun	13.850	10.900	12.900	12.400	191.400
8	Lo Yu Ju	12.800	8.625	12.900	13.025	191.400
8	Wu Chen Hsuan	13.400	9.375		12.600	191.400
8	Mai Liu Hsiang Han			11.900		191.400
9	Hong Kong	50.950	39.800	50.300	48.075	189.125
9	Hiu Ying Angel Wong	13.850	11.150	14.050	13.575	189.125
9	Yan Choi Nim	13.100	10.025	11.800	11.925	189.125
9	Ying Vut Tsz	11.500	9.225	12.350	11.900	189.125
9	Zhang Wei		9.400	12.100	10.675	189.125
9	Man Leung Ka	12.500				189.125
9	Yee Tsui Lok					189.125
10	Philippines	46.550	27.500	42.300	43.725	160.075
10	Cintamoni de Guzman	11.600	12.450	11.400	11.050	160.075
10	Frances Audrey Muñoz	11.600	6.950	11.800	10.950	160.075
10	Ma. Virginia Acuña	12.000	8.100	9.550	10.800	160.075
10	Dezerie Saldana	11.350		9.550	10.925	160.075

=== Seniors ===
==== All-Around ====
Rank	Gymnast	Vault (gymnastics)	Uneven bars	Balance beam	Floor (gymnastics)	Total
1st place, gold medalist(s)	Nastia Liukin (USA)	15.000	16.650	16.400	14.800	62.850
2nd place, silver medalist(s)	Jana Bieger (USA)	15.050	15.025	15.050	14.800	59.925
3rd place, bronze medalist(s)	Dasha Joura (AUS)	13.950	15.000	15.150	15.100	59.200
4	Ashleigh Brennan (AUS)	14.550	13.975	15.800	14.700	59.025
5	Huang Qiushuang (CHN)	14.200	13.975	16.050	14.625	58.850
6	Kristina Vaculik (CAN)	14.000	14.275	15.800	14.350	58.425
7	Tian Mengsi (CHN)	14.650	14.275	15.200	13.900	58.025
8	Alena Zmeu (RUS)	14.000	14.175	14.500	13.900	56.575
9	Ericka García (MEX)	14.600	13.350	14.650	13.400	56.000
10	Chinami Otaki (JPN)	13.750	13.975	14.450	13.150	55.325
11	Marisela Cantú (MEX)	13.800	12.950	14.950	13.475	55.175
12	Nanaho Hidaka (JPN)	13.750	11.725	14.950	14.050	54.475
13	Jessica Gil (COL)	14.450	11.425	14.000	13.675	53.550
14	Nathalia Sánchez (COL)	13.650	13.550	12.950	13.050	53.200
15	Hiu Ying Angel Wong (HKG)	13.850	11.150	14.050	13.575	52.625
16	Jia Hui Tay (SIN)	13.400	12.075	14.400	12.100	51.975
17	Heem Wei Lim (SIN)	13.300	11.125	14.500	12.350	51.275
18	Noor Hasnan (MAS)	12.350	11.475	13.150	12.300	49.275
19	Yan Choi Nim (HKG)	13.100	10.025	11.800	11.925	46.850
20	Chen Chun Min (TPE)	12.600	9.350	12.200	12.575	46.725
21	Cintamoni de Guzman (PHI)	11.600	12.450	11.400	11.050	46.500
22	Nansy Damianova (CAN)	14.650	14.650	-	14.600	43.900
23	Ma. Virginia Acuña (PHI)	12.000	8.100	9.550	10.800	40.450
24	Ludmila Ezhova (RUS)	-	14.800	15.700	-	30.500
25	Mai Liu Hsiang Han (TPE)	-	-	11.900	-	11.900

==== Vault ====
Rank	Gymnast	A Score	B Score	Pen.	Score 1	A Score	B Score	Pen.	Score 2	Total
1st place, gold medalist(s)	Anna Myzdrikova (RUS)	5.8	8.850		14.650	5.2	9.050	0.1	14.150	14.400
2nd place, silver medalist(s)	Jessica Gil (COL)	5.5	9.250		14.750	4.8	8.950		13.750	14.250
3rd place, bronze medalist(s)	Ericka García (MEX)	5.5	8.950		14.450	4.6	9.150		13.750	14.100
4	Tian Mengsi (CHN)	5.5	8.800		14.300	5.0	8.850		13.850	14.075
5	Nansy Damianova (CAN)	5.5	9.025		14.525	4.4	9.000		13.400	13.962
6	Hiu Ying Angel Wong (HKG)	5.2	8.725		13.925	5.0	8.925		13.925	13.925
7	Marisela Cantú (MEX)	5.0	8.825		13.825	4.6	9.050		13.650	13.737
8	Kristina Vaculik (CAN)	5.0	8.950		13.950	4.8	8.175		12.975	13.462

==== Uneven Bars ====
Rank	Gymnast	A Score	B Score	Pen.	Total
1st place, gold medalist(s)	Jana Bieger (USA)	6.6	8.950		15.550
2nd place, silver medalist(s)	Kristina Vaculik (CAN)	6.4	8.825		15.225
2nd place, silver medalist(s)	Nastia Liukin (USA)	7.4	7.825		15.225
4	Lauren Mitchell (AUS)	6.5	8.600		15.100
5	Dasha Joura (AUS)	6.2	8.750		14.950
6	Nansy Damianova (CAN)	6.0	8.625		14.625
7	Ludmila Ezhova (RUS)	6.2	8.200	0.1	14.300
8	Tian Mengsi (CHN)	6.1	7.525		13.625

==== Balance Beam ====
Rank	Gymnast	A Score	B Score	Pen.	Total
1st place, gold medalist(s)	Nastia Liukin (USA)	6.6	9.575		16.175
2nd place, silver medalist(s)	Huang Qiushuang (CHN)	6.6	9.075		15.675
3rd place, bronze medalist(s)	Jana Bieger (USA)	6.6	8.925		15.525
4	Ludmila Ezhova (RUS)	6.5	8.900		15.400
5	Dasha Joura (AUS)	6.4	8.850		15.250
6	Kristina Vaculik (CAN)	5.9	8.875		14.775
7	Ashleigh Brennan (AUS)	6.3	8.400		14.700
8	Zhang Xin (CHN)	5.4	8.850		14.250

==== Floor Exercise ====
Rank	Gymnast	A Score	B Score	Pen.	Total
1st place, gold medalist(s)	Darlene Hill (USA)	6.1	9.325		15.425
2nd place, silver medalist(s)	Dasha Joura (AUS)	6.1	9.200		15.300
3rd place, bronze medalist(s)	Anna Myzdrikova (RUS)	6.3	8.750		15.050
4	Huang Qiushuang (CHN)	5.5	9.125		14.625
4	Nastia Liukin (USA)	6.1	8.625	0.1	14.625
6	Zhang Xin (CHN)	5.9	8.675		14.575
7	Ashleigh Brennan (AUS)	6.0	8.650	0.1	14.550
8	Nansy Damianova (CAN)	5.9	9.025	0.1	14.425

=== Juniors ===
==== All-Around ====
Rank	Gymnast	Vault (gymnastics)	Uneven bars	Balance beam	Floor (gymnastics)	Total
1st place, gold medalist(s)	Rebecca Bross (USA)	14.800	15.000	15.900	15.350	61.050
2nd place, silver medalist(s)	Samantha Shapiro (USA)	14.300	15.225	15.800	14.775	60.100
3rd place, bronze medalist(s)	Viktoria Komova (RUS)	14.550	13.225	14.650	15.175	57.600
4	Charlotte Mackie (CAN)	14.700	13.150	15.200	14.525	57.575
5	Christine Peng-Peng Lee (CAN)	14.150	13.975	14.700	14.550	57.375
6	Guan Wenli (CHN)	13.850	14.100	15.350	13.625	56.925
7	Cui Jie (CHN)	14.200	12.925	15.200	14.425	56.750
8	Shizuka Tozawa (JPN)	14.150	12.950	14.600	14.525	56.225
9	Erica Lynn Danko (JPN)	14.750	13.075	13.950	14.275	56.050
10	Britt Greeley (AUS)	13.850	13.150	15.100	13.600	55.700
11	Emily Little (AUS)	14.450	12.925	14.550	13.750	55.675
12	Nailya Mustafina (RUS)	13.450	13.225	13.100	14.600	54.375
13	Karla Salazar (MEX)	13.200	12.025	14.050	13.925	53.200
14	Britt Reusche-Lari (PER)	12.650	11.075	13.750	12.875	50.350
15	Chen Yu Chun (TPE)	13.850	10.900	12.900	12.400	50.050
16	Paula Martínez (MEX)	12.850	11.150	13.500	12.150	49.650
17	Lo Yu Ju (TPE)	12.800	8.625	12.900	13.025	47.350
18	Zhang Wei (HKG)	10.650	9.400	12.100	10.675	42.825
19	Frances Audrey Muñoz (PHI)	11.600	6.950	11.800	10.950	41.300
20	Leung Ka Man (HKG)	12.500	4.775	10.650	10.550	38.475
21	Dezerie Saldana (PHI)	11.350	-	9.550	10.925	31.825

==== Vault ====
Rank	Gymnast	A Score	B Score	Pen.	Total
1st place, gold medalist(s)	Rebecca Bross (USA)	5.8	9.225		15.025
2nd place, silver medalist(s)	Erica Lynn Danko (JPN)	5.8	9.000		14.800
3rd place, bronze medalist(s)	Brittany Rogers (CAN)	5.5	9.125		14.625
4	Charlotte Mackie (CAN)	5.5	8.950		14.450
5	Emily Little (AUS)	5.5	8.900	0.1	14.400
6	Cui Jie (CHN)	5.0	9.225		14.225
7	Samantha Shapiro (USA)	5.0	9.050		14.050
8	Viktoria Komova (RUS)	5.0	8.675		13.675

==== Uneven Bars ====
Rank	Gymnast	A Score	B Score	Pen.	Total
1st place, gold medalist(s)	Samantha Shapiro (USA)	6.4	9.050		15.450
2nd place, silver medalist(s)	Christine Peng-Peng Lee (CAN)	6.0	8.925		14.925
3rd place, bronze medalist(s)	Brittany Rogers (CAN)	6.0	8.575		14.575
4	Viktoria Komova (RUS)	5.7	8.475		14.175
5	Guan Wenli (CHN)	6.1	7.750	0.1	13.850
6	Akiho Sato (JPN)	5.5	8.200		13.700
7	Violetta Malikova (RUS)	5.6	7.075		12.675
8	Rebecca Bross (USA)	2.9	3.950	0.6	6.250

==== Balance Beam ====
Rank	Gymnast	A Score	B Score	Pen.	Total
1st place, gold medalist(s)	Cui Jie (CHN)	6.7	9.325		16.025
1st place, gold medalist(s)	Rebecca Bross (USA)	6.8	9.225		16.025
3rd place, bronze medalist(s)	Huang Ying (CHN)	6.8	9.125		15.925
4	Viktoria Komova (RUS)	6.9	8.800		15.700
5	Samantha Shapiro (USA)	6.2	8.975	0.1	15.175
6	Charlotte Mackie (CAN)	6.0	8.650		14.650
7	Britt Greeley (AUS)	6.0	8.600		14.600
8	Brittany Rogers (CAN)	5.4	8.425		13.825

==== Floor Exercise ====
Rank	Gymnast	A Score	B Score	Pen.	Total
1st place, gold medalist(s)	Rebecca Bross (USA)	6.2	9.300		15.500
2nd place, silver medalist(s)	Nailya Mustafina (RUS)	5.7	9.000		14.700
2nd place, silver medalist(s)	Shizuka Tozawa (JPN)	5.8	8.900		14.700
4	Christine Peng-Peng Lee (CAN)	5.7	8.975	0.1	14.575
5	Huang Ying (CHN)	5.4	9.150		14.550
6	Charlotte Mackie (CAN)	5.6	8.675		14.275
7	Viktoria Komova (RUS)	5.9	8.100		14.000
8	Samantha Shapiro (USA)	5.8	7.650		13.450

== Medal count ==
Rank	Nation	Gold	Silver	Bronze	Total
1	United States	15	6	3	24
2	China	6	4	6	16
3	Japan	2	6	3	11
4	Russia	2	5	7	14
5	Canada	1	3	2	6
6	Australia	1	1	2	4
7	Hong Kong	1	0	0	1
8	Colombia	0	1	1	2
9	Mexico	0	0	2	2
Totals (9 entries)		28	26	26	80
