= Jordyn Pedersen =

Canadian artistic gymnast (born 1997)

- Born: 26 November 1997 (age 28) Mississauga, Canada
- Height: 161 cm (5 ft 3 in)

Gymnastics career
- Discipline: Women's artistic gymnastics
- Country represented: Canada
- College team: Georgia Bulldogs
Medal record
Women's artistic gymnastics
Representing Canada
Pacific Rim Championships
Bronze medal – third place	2012 Everett	Team

Jordyn Pedersen (born 26 November 1997) is a Canadian artistic gymnast.

== Biography ==
She was born on 26 November 1997 in Mississauga, Ontario, to Randy and Melody Pedersen. In 2014, she participated to the World Artistic Gymnastics Championships in Nanning, China, where she placed 12th with Canada in the team competition.

In 2017, she joined the University of Georgia. She suffered from shoulder pain throughout her sophomore year, taking medicines to control it. The injury eventually led to her retirement. After her retirement she served as a student assistant coach.
