= Christine Peng-Peng Lee =

Canadian artistic gymnast

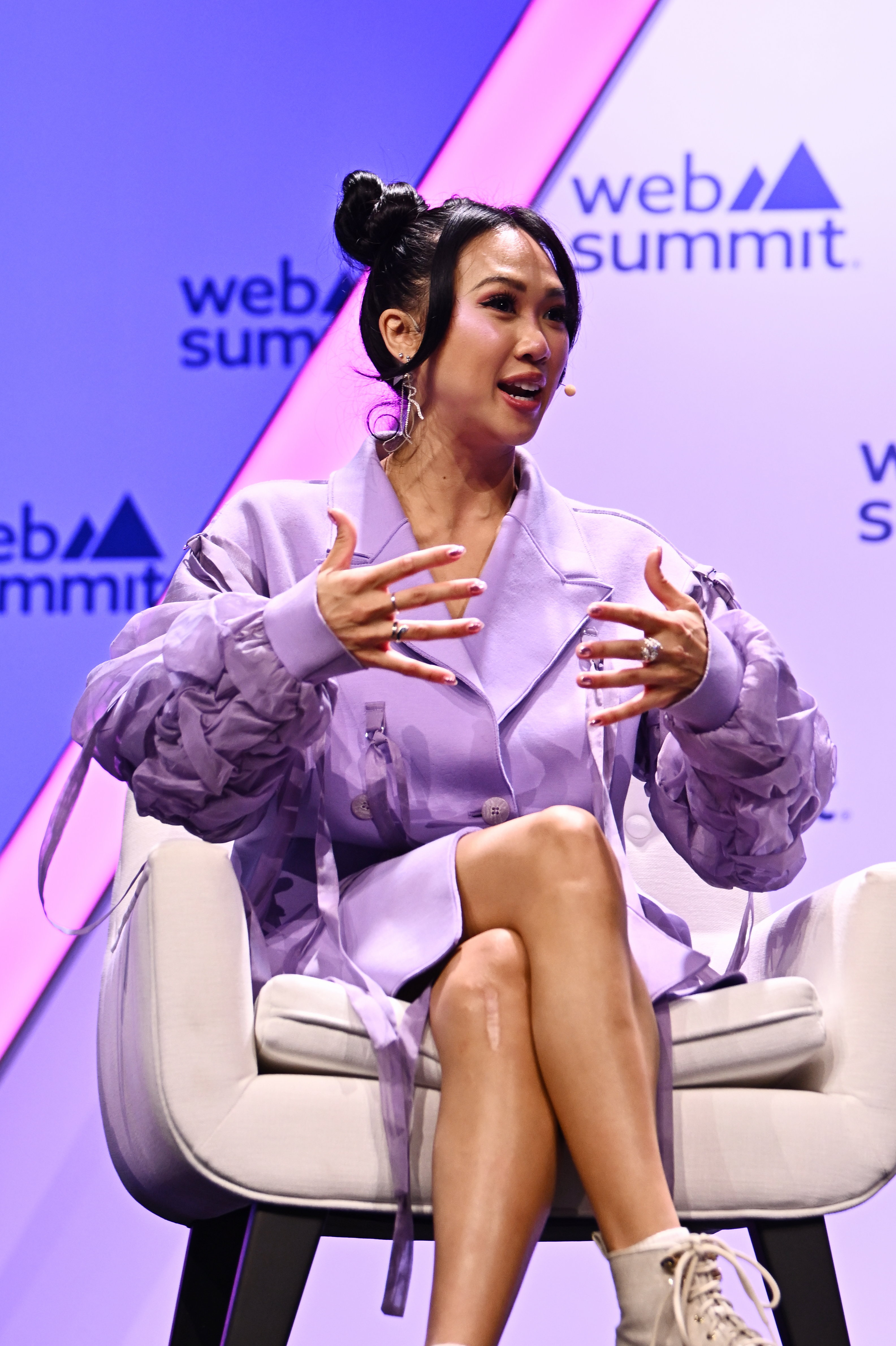
- Lee in 2023

Personal information
- Full name: Christine Jennifer Peng-Peng Lee
- Nickname: Peng-Peng
- Born: June 27, 1993 (age 33) Scarborough, Ontario
- Height: 1.57 m (5 ft 2 in)

Gymnastics career
- Discipline: Women's artistic gymnastics
- Country represented: Canada
- College team: UCLA Bruins
- Club: Sport Seneca/Oakville Gymnastics Club
- Head coach: Kelly Manjak
- Assistant coaches: Lorne Bobkin; Susan Manjak
- Former coaches: Carol-Angela Orchard; Brian McVey; Valorie Kondos Field
- Choreographer: Valorie Kondos Field
- Eponymous skills: two flying flairs as mount (balance beam)
- Retired: April 21, 2018
Medal record
Representing Canada
Pacific Rim Championships
Silver medal – second place	2008 San Jose	Team
Silver medal – second place	2008 San Jose	Uneven Bars
Silver medal – second place	2012 Everett	Balance Beam
Silver medal – second place	2012 Everett	Floor
Bronze medal – third place	2012 Everett	Team
Bronze medal – third place	2012 Everett	All-Around
Pan American Games
Silver medal – second place	2011 Guadalajara	Team
Bronze medal – third place	2007 Rio de Janeiro	Team
Representing UCLA Bruins
NCAA National Championships
Gold medal – first place	2018 St. Louis	Balance Beam
Gold medal – first place	2018 St. Louis	Team
- Musical career
- Genres: Pop
- Instrument: Vocals
- Label: PENG

Christine Jennifer Peng-Peng Lee (born June 27, 1993), also known as Peng Peng, is a Canadian actress and singer and former artistic gymnast. She was a member of the Canadian team that qualified for the 2012 Summer Olympics, though a knee injury prevented her from competing in the Games. She attended UCLA and led the gymnastics team to the 2018 NCAA National Championship. Lee prefers to use her Chinese name Peng Peng when doing gymnastics, saying it makes her feel like "someone completely different."

== Junior career ==
=== 2007 ===
In May, Lee competed at the Canadian Championships in Regina, Saskatchewan. She placed second in the all around finals with a score of 57.400. and second in balance beam event finals with a score of 15.55.

In November, Lee competed at the Junior Pan American Championships in Guatemala City, Guatemala. The Canadian team won the silver medal with Lee earning 58.017, the highest score out of the Canadian gymnasts, placing her fourth in the all around competition. In the event finals she earned the silver medal on vault with a score of 13.700 and floor with a score of 14.450. Lee also placed fourth on uneven bars with a score of 13.825 and sixth on balance beam with a score of 13.150.

In December, Lee competed at Elite Canada in Abbotsford, British Columbia. She placed second in the all around competition with a score of 56.150. In event finals, Lee won floor scoring 14.75 and placed third on both uneven bars and balance beam scoring 14.20 and 14.35 respectively.

=== 2008 ===
In March, Lee participated in the Pacific Rim Championships in San Jose, United States. The Canadian team earned a silver medal and Lee placed fifth in the all around competition scoring 57.375. In the event finals, she earned a silver medal on uneven bars scoring 14.925 and placed fourth on floor scoring 14.575.

In June, Lee placed third in the all around final of the Canadian Championships in Calgary, Alberta with a score of 56.200. In event finals, she placed first on balance beam scoring 15.850, first on floor scoring 14.900, and fifth on uneven bars scoring 14.250.

Lee was diagnosed with spondylolisthesis and spondylolysis in the L5 vertebrae and took a two-year hiatus from gymnastics to allow her back to heal. She said, "The decision to return to gymnastics was hard because I wasn't sure if I would be able to do gymnastics again. I didn't want to injure my back any further and when they told me if I continued and my back was not stable, there was a chance of my spine hitting a nerve so that terrified me. I knew I always wanted to come back and my goals ultimately drew me back into the sport."

== Senior career ==
=== 2010 ===
In December, Lee returned to gymnastics at Elite Canada in Quebec, Canada. She won the all around competition with a score of 54.800. In event finals, Lee placed second on floor scoring 13.850, second on balance beam scoring 14.250, and eighth on uneven bars scoring 11.000.

=== 2011 ===
At the end of March, Lee competed at the Artistic Gymnastics World Cup in Doha, Qatar. She placed fifth in the uneven bars final with a score of 11.900, sixth in the balance beam final with a score of 12.250, and fifth in the floor final with a score of 13.100.

In October, Lee was a member of the Canadian team at the 2011 World Artistic Gymnastics Championships in Tokyo, Japan. They placed eleventh in the team competition which meant that they would have to compete in London in January in order to qualify a full team for the Olympics. In qualifications, Lee was the top Canadian gymnast with an all around score of 54.632 and placed nineteenth in the all around final scoring 54.732. Lee told International Gymnast Magazine, "I thought qualifications went well, but there are still improvements I would like to make. I am really focusing on the process of my routines, like taking it one skill at a time. The results will come afterwards."

Later in October, Lee was a member of the Canadian team that won the silver medal at the 2011 Pan American Games in Guadalajara, Mexico. She was Canada's highest scoring team member, contributing a score of 55.325 which qualified her in second place for the all around competition but she only scored 54.575 in the finals placing her fourth behind team member Kristina Vaculik. Lee ended the competition by placing fifth in the uneven bars final with a score of 13.575.

Lee's last competition of the year was the Mexican Gymnastics Open in December in Acapulco, Mexico. She finished second in the individual all around scoring 55.500. Lee was paired with Danell Leyva for the mixed pairs competition, which they won with a combined score of 144.850.

=== 2012 ===
In January, Lee competed at the London Prepares series where Canada qualified a full team to the 2012 Summer Olympics. She was the highest scoring member of the Canadian team contributing a 55.565 all-around score. Lee then placed fifth in the uneven bars final, scoring 14.366.

At the International Gymnix Challenge in Montreal, Canada on March 9, Lee won the all-around competition with a score of 57.875. She had the highest score on each apparatus except for vault.

At the Pacific Rim Championships in March, Lee helped Canada place third behind the US and China followed by a bronze medal in the individual all around competition with a score of 57.800. In the event finals, Lee tied for fourth on uneven bars scoring 14.600 and earned silver medals on both balance beam and floor scoring 15.300 and 14.575 respectively. She told International Gymnast Magazine, "I was just trying to have a lot of fun and also was trying to get a little more experience competing my new routines. My expectations weren't too too high."

In April, Lee won the uneven bars gold medal at the World Cup in Osijek, Croatia with a score of 14.475. She also placed fourth in the balance beam final scoring 13.400 and the floor final scoring 13.375.

In May, Lee was to compete at the Canadian Championships in Regina, Canada, but tore an anterior cruciate ligament practicing a double-twisting Yurchenko vault during podium training before the competition. The following month, she withdrew from the Olympic selection process.

She posted on social media:

To all my family, gym friends and fans,

The last couple of weeks have been very difficult due to my recent knee injury. I was informed that I had torn my ACL and was devastated because I've committed such a huge part of my life to the sport. It happened at a very bad time and as you can imagine, the news was extremely hard to digest.
I have spent a great deal of time consulting with doctors and did a lot of soul searching to determine what was best for me. I have decided to withdraw from the selection process for the 2012 Olympic Games. I do not want to rush into doing gymnastics for the Olympics if my knee could be at a greater risk and possibly affect me in the future. I will be attending the Olympic Games to support Team Canada and will be cheering them at the top of my lungs!
I want to take this opportunity to thank my coaches, Gymnastics Canada, teammates and fans for all the love and support you have given me through this difficult time. I am truly honoured to be surrounded by such loving and supportive people. All of you have really helped lift my spirits with your kind words and well wishes. I've read every single message and have taken it to heart. I love you all!!!
I am really excited about continuing my gymnastics career at UCLA and becoming part of the Bruin Family. I still have the same passion and love for the sport and look forward to competing in the future.

Peng Peng Lee

At the end of June, Lee said, "My knee is doing really well. I have had lots of treatment on it, and the mobility is coming back much faster than I thought. I'm not quite sure when I will be able to train on it again. I am taking it day by day right now. Once I undergo surgery I will have a better understanding of when I can start training again and what rehab I should be doing."

In July, Lee travelled to London with the Canadian team to act as their captain at the 2012 Summer Olympics. Before the Olympics she told International Gymnast Magazine, "I am so honored to be team captain and can't wait to be there with the team through their Olympic journey. I want to make sure the team always stays positive and supportive with each other through this process, and that they enjoy the Olympics and stick together as a team. Also, I would like to pass on some of my experiences of being part of a team and handling different pressures that they may come across. My teammates will be looking to me for advice and leadership. As we get closer to the Olympic Games, the athletes and I will get more nervous and trainings will become more intense. I try to stay calm and always try to get everyone to stick together as a team because, during these pressures, having your team support you makes the experience more enjoyable. Everyone on the team is going after the same goals and dreams, and no one should feel isolated, because every member plays a substantial role. By having a positive attitude throughout the process and supporting one another, I think the team will do really well." The Canadian team finish fifth in the team final which it the highest placement Canada has ever achieved. The gymnasts wore white flowers in their hair as a tribute to Lee who always wears white flowers in her hair during competitions. She said, "They wore flowers in their hair in honor of me. Just a whole bunch of emotions went through me at that point because it was just amazing to have your teammates support you in that way. It wasn't verbal support, it was physical. I thought it was an amazing moment, for them to even think of me at their Olympic Games."

== Collegiate career ==
Lee competed for the UCLA Bruins gymnastics team. She redshirted her freshman year to recover from knee surgery, and was unable to compete in 2014 due to another knee surgery. In her last meet for UCLA for the 2017 season, she scored her second perfect ten on uneven bars.

Lee received a sixth year of NCAA eligibility to compensate for the two seasons missed for knee surgeries.

In 2018, Lee recorded four regular-season and one post-season perfect tens (four on beam, one on bars) and ended the regular season No. 1 on balance beam (9.985 RQS) and No. 9 on uneven bars (9.940 RQS). She won the NCAA Balance Beam title and contributed two perfect tens to help UCLA clinch their seventh national title.

On May 3, 2018, Lee received the Honda Sports Award. She was named the Co-Pac-12 Conference 2018 Woman of the Year.

=== Perfect 10.0s ===
Season	Date	Event	Meet
2017	February 11, 2017	Uneven Bars	UCLA vs Stanford
2017	March 12, 2017	Uneven Bars	UCLA vs UNC
2017	April 15, 2017	Balance Beam	NCAA Championships Super Six
2018	January 28, 2018	Balance Beam	Metroplex Challenge
2018	February 4, 2018	Balance Beam	UCLA vs Oklahoma
2018	March 11, 2018	Uneven Bars	UCLA @ Stanford
2018	March 11, 2018	Balance Beam	UCLA @ Stanford
2018	March 25, 2018	Balance Beam	2018 Pac-12 Championships
2018	April 21, 2018	Uneven Bars	NCAA Championships Super Six
2018	April 21, 2018	Balance Beam	NCAA Championships Super Six

== Discography ==
All song credits are adapted from Spotify and Apple Music.

=== Singles ===
==== As lead artist ====
Title	Year	Album	Writer(s)	Producer(s)
"Money on Me - Gold Over America Tour Mix”	2024	The First Salute	Christine Lee, Zev Troxler	Zev Troxler
"Pretty Please"	2024	The First Salute	Christine Lee, Terence Po Lun Lam, Zev Troxler	Polun
"Captain"	2025	The First Salute	Christine Lee, Bendik Møller, Ella Isaacson	Bendik Møller
"Here 4 U"	2025	The First Salute	Christine Lee, Shah Infinite, OGWebbie 4 Treated Crew, Bella Romero, Camilla Dunhill	No producers credited
"I Like It" (with Olly Sholotan)	2025	Non-album single	Christine Lee, Olly Sholotan	Olly Sholotan
"High Life"	2026	Non-album single	Christine Lee, Michelle Zarlenga, Chance Chantry	Chantry Johnson
"Sriracha"	2026	Non-album single	Christine Lee, Michelle Zarlenga, Drew Louis	Drew Louis
"Tell Me What's My Name"	2026	Non-album single	Christine Lee, David Arkwright, Natania Lalwani, Miranda Glory	David Arkwright
"Lighters"	2026	Non-album single	Christine Lee, Zev Troxler	Chase Jackson

==== Extended plays ====
Title	Details
The First Salute	Released: December 12, 2025; Label: Self-released; Format: Digital download, streaming; Track listing: 1. "Intro (The Sun Will Rise)"; 2. "Pretty Please"; 3. "4 Nothing"; 4. "Here 4 U"; 5. "Captain"; 6. "Money on Me - Gold Over America Tour Mix"

Awards
Preceded by Alex McMurtry	Honda Sports Award (gymnastics); 2018	Succeeded by Maggie Nichols
