= Jessica Savona =

Canadian artistic gymnast

- Full name: Jessica Savona
- Born: July 19, 1994 (age 32) Etobicoke, Ontario, Canada
- Spouse: Brennan Maher (m. 2024)

Gymnastics career
- Discipline: Women's artistic gymnastics
- Country represented: Canada
- College team: LSU Tigers (2013–2016)
- Club: Oakville Gymnastics
- Head coaches: Lorne Bobkin, Kelly Manjak, and Susan Manjak (Oakville); D-D Breaux (LSU)
- Music: Smooth Criminal
- Awards: SEC floor exercise co-champion (2013); first-team All-American on floor exercise (2014, 2016)
Medal record
Pan American Gymnastics Championships
Silver medal – second place	2010 Guadalajara	Team
Canadian Championships
Gold medal – first place	2011 Charlottetown	Balance beam
Gold medal – first place	2011 Charlottetown	Floor
Silver medal – second place	2011 Charlottetown	All-around
Bronze medal – third place	2010 Kamloops	Balance beam

Jessica Savona (born July 19, 1994) is a Canadian artistic gymnast who was selected as the first alternate for Canada’s women’s gymnastics team at the 2012 Summer Olympics team. She competed for the LSU Tigers from 2013 to 2016, earning first-team All-America honors on floor exercise in 2014 and 2016.

== Junior career ==
=== 2008 ===
In February, Savona tore her right anterior cruciate ligament while performing her beam dismount and had surgery to repair it in May.

=== 2009 ===
In June, Savona competed at the Canadian Championships in Hamilton, Canada. She placed sixth in the floor finals with a score of 12.750

== Senior career ==
=== 2010 ===
In May, Savona competed at the Canadian Championships in Kamloops, Canada. She placed fourth in the all around final with a score of 54.650. In event finals, she placed fourth on uneven bars scoring 13.000 and third on balance beam scoring 13.850. She said, "I had my first meet back from surgery at the 2009 Canadian Championships. That did not go so well because I came in 13th, and it was a bad meet. Many people thought I was finished and I couldn't get back to where I was. But I guess my determination, hard work and my mental strength led me to my recent success placing fourth at the recent national championships, making the world championships team and traveling to my first ever worlds competition!"

In September, Savona helped Canada win team silver at the Pan American Gymnastics Championships in Guadalajara, Mexico.

In October, Savona competed at the 2010 World Artistic Gymnastics Championships. She contributed to Canada's thirteenth-place finish with scores of 13.800 on vault, 12.716 on uneven bars, and 13.700 on floor. Before the competition she said, "I think our team's strongest suits will be our determination to show the world that we are coming back, and that we are all able to do high-level gymnastics compared to the rest of the world."

=== 2011 ===
In May, Savona competed at the Canadian Championships in Charlottetown, Canada. She placed second in the all around final with a score of 53.750. In event finals, she placed first on balance beam scoring 13.475 and first on floor scoring 13.850. "I came here expecting to hit my routines," Savona said. "I wasn't expecting to win on beam and my floor wasn't as good as in the all around but I'm proud of how I did."

In July, Savona tore her left anterior cruciate ligament while performing on vault. She had surgery to repair it in August and began simple rehabilitation three days later. "(Randy Foster, her physiotherapist) is saying that the recovery on the left knee is a lot better than my right, and my left knee seems to be healing a lot faster with more progress than what was seen with my right," Savona told International Gymnast Magazine in September. "Therefore, he and I believe that I will hopefully be back sooner than expected, without forcing anything, and pushing my knee to its limits, of course."

=== 2012 ===
In May, Savona competed at the Canadian Championships in Regina, Canada. She placed fourth in the all around final with a score of 54.800. In the event finals, she placed sixth on the balance beam, scoring 13.050 and fifth on floor, scoring 13.450.

At the end of June, Savona was one of the twelve gymnasts chosen to compete at the Final Olympic Selection meet in Gatineau, Canada. On the first day of competition she placed fourth in the all around with a score of 53.700. Based on her performances here and at the Canadian Championships she was named as the first reserve for the team that will compete at the 2012 Summer Olympics.

== Collegiate career ==
2013

As a freshman, she scored 9.950 on floor exercise at the SEC Championships, tying four other gymnasts for the title.

2014

She earned first-team All-America honors on floor and tied for eighth in the NCAA individual floor final with a 9.900.

2016

She earned first-team All-America honors on floor a second time. LSU finished second in the NCAA team championship that season.
