= Daria Joura =

Australian artistic gymnast

- Full name: Daria Vladimirovna Joura
- Nickname: Dasha
- Born: 2 May 1990 (age 36) Leninsk-Kuznetsky, USSR
- Height: 154 cm (5 ft 1 in)

Gymnastics career
- Discipline: Women's artistic gymnastics
- Country represented: Australia
- Club: Northern Districts Gymnastics Club
- Music: Assassin's Tango by John Powell
- Retired: 2010
Medal record
World Cup
Gold medal – first place	2007 Stuttgart	Floor
Silver medal – second place	2006 Stuttgart	Floor
Silver medal – second place	2007 Stuttgart	Uneven Bars
Bronze medal – third place	2006 Shanghai	Floor
Bronze medal – third place	2006 Glasgow	Uneven Bars
Bronze medal – third place	2007 Cottbus	Uneven Bars
Bronze medal – third place	2007 Stuttgart	Vault
Bronze medal – third place	2008 Moscow	Floor
Pacific Rim Championships
Silver medal – second place	2006 Honolulu	Team
Silver medal – second place	2008 San Jose	Floor Exercise
Bronze medal – third place	2008 San Jose	All Around

Daria "Dasha" Joura (Russian: Дарья Владимировна "Даша" Жура; born 2 May 1990) is a retired Australian gymnast. She is a triple Australian senior all-around champion and competed at the 2008 Summer Olympics and the World Artistic Gymnastics Championships in 2006 and 2007.

== Biography ==
=== Personal life ===
Daria Joura was born in Leninsk-Kuznetsky, the daughter of Vladimir and Irina Joura, both gymnastics coaches. The family moved to Australia in 1997 when Vladimir Joura accepted an offer to coach at the Western Australian Institute of Sport (WAIS).

=== Career ===
Joura began gymnastics at the age of 6 at the Olympic Academy in Russia, because she was "always at the gym" with her parents. After the family emigrated, she trained at WAIS with coaches Martine George and Nikolai Lapchine.

Joura competed in her first Australian National Championships in 2001, winning the all-around title, two silver medals on the floor exercise and vault, and a bronze on the balance beam in the junior national division. In 2003, she moved up to the junior international division, winning the national all-around title and placing second on vault and floor. She also competed internationally for the first time in 2003, when she placed 6th in the all-around at the Canberra Cup. In 2005, Joura missed Nationals with an injury, but competed in several other events, including the Australian Youth Olympic Festival where she won a silver in the team competition and floor gold and the Japan Junior International meet. At the trials for the 2006 Commonwealth Games shortly after she fell several times and was not placed on the team.

Her first international meet as a senior was the Pacific Alliance Championships, where she was on the silver medal-winning Australian team. At the 2006 Australian National Championships she finished in first place in the all-around and every apparatus but the uneven bars. She then won a bronze medal on the floor at a World Cup competition in Shanghai. Joura's first major international competition was the 2006 World Championships in Aarhus. She helped the Australian team to a sixth-place finish, and competed on every apparatus in the team finals. Her fifth-place finish in the all-around was the second best ever by an Australian gymnast, after Monette Russo's bronze all-around medal in 2005. Joura also competed in the uneven bars event final, where she came in sixth.

Following the World Championships, Joura competed in two World Cup meets, the DTB Cup in Stuttgart, Germany and the Glasgow Grand Prix in Scotland. She won a silver on floor in Stuttgart and a bronze medal on the uneven bars in Glasgow.

She began 2007 at the American Cup in Jacksonville, Florida. During this competition Joura successfully debuted a number of new skills, including a Comaneci Salto on bars.

In May, Joura went on to win her second consecutive Australian all-around title at the National Championships in Melbourne, as well as golds on vault, uneven bars, floor and in the team event with her Western Australian team. She finished 5th in the beam event final. The 2007 Nationals were held in conjunction with a dual meet against World champion Chinese team. Australia beat China in the team event, Joura went on to place 6th on uneven bars, 8th on balance beam and 2nd on floor behind Cheng Fei. In preparation for the upcoming 2007 World Championships, Joura then competed in a similar dual competition against Japan, where she won gold medals in the team, all-around, vault and floor events, plus a bronze on beam.

Joura did not have the best of competitions at the 2007 World Artistic Gymnastics Championships in Stuttgart, Germany. In the preliminary competition, Joura fell on the uneven bars and balance beam, but stuck her Yurchenko-double vault and performed a floor routine that qualified her for the all-around final. She did not qualify for the floor or the vault event final. The Australian team finished in 11th place, missing the teams final but qualifying through to the 2008 Olympic Games. Joura was the only Australian woman to qualify for the all-around final, where she finished 10th after errors on bars and beam.

In October, Joura headed back to Stuttgart for the DTB World Cup event with teammate Lauren Mitchell. After qualifying for all four apparatus event finals, Joura won a bronze on vault, a silver on uneven bars and a gold on floor – her first at a World Cup competition and the most medals she's won in one international competition.

At the Good Luck Beijing Tournament, the test event for the 2008 Beijing Olympic Games, Joura qualified first to the all-around final with four hit routines out of four. She repeated this showing in the final, and won the silver medal. She won the bronze on uneven bars, placed fourth on floor, and fifth on beam.

Joura began her Beijing preparations in 2008 by agreeing to write weekly columns for PerthNow, which is a division of Perth's Sunday Times Newspaper, about her progress. She has written about her perspective on gymnastics, with details on her motivational techniques and her thoughts on travelling long distances for meets to her expectations for Beijing.

In March 2008, again alongside Lauren Mitchell, she travelled to the US for a training camp with the Olympic Squad and competed in two competitions while there: The 10th annual Friendship Classic and the Pacific Rim Championships in San Jose. Ashleigh Brennan was the third member of the Australian team at the Pacific Rim Championships. At the Friendship Classic, Joura won the AA, vault and uneven bars titles and placed second on the balance beam and floor. At the Pacific Rim Championships, Joura won a bronze in the all around and a silver on floor.

Joura was a lock for the Olympic team after winning her third consecutive national all-around title in May, a feat matched by former WA competitor and Olympian Allana Slater. She also won a third straight title on vault and floor and her second uneven bars title. She led the WA team to a silver medal, despite posting a world-best score on floor which included the debut of her double layout and a unique quadruple pirouette. She also won several monetary cheques that would go towards her training in the prestigious National Apparatus Challenge days later. Right after Nationals, she jetted to Russia with Lauren Mitchell to take part in the Stars of Moscow World Cup, where she debuted the revamped floor routine on international soil and won the bronze medal. Joura, along with Mitchell, Brennan, Olivia Vivian, Shona Morgan and Georgia Bonora, was named to the Olympic team.

== Beijing 2008 ==
Despite the team's weeks of preparation, and talk in the media of a potential medal (or medals, given hit routines) Joura suffered several mishaps in Beijing. Prior to the qualification round, she injured her ankle on floor exercise. She struggled through the qualification competition, stumbling repeatedly on floor and on beam in noticeable pain. She made valiant efforts on uneven bars and vault despite the pain, helping her team through to the final in 5th place, but finishing the competition in tears knowing she had made no individual finals (ranked 44th all-around) and that her medal chances were effectively ended there and then. The only apparatus Joura was fit to compete in during the team final was the uneven bars. During the routine she caught a Gienger release too close to the bar, smashing her face on the top bar but continuing with the routine as though nothing had happened. She now not only had an ankle injury but a bloodied nose and black eye, but helped the team on to a historic 6th-place finish. In press interviews, she said that she knew that the team was priority and that she didn't have to compete those routines, but she didn't want to let the team down. Her time in Beijing clearly became a learning experience. When teammates Shona Morgan and Georgia Bonora qualified through to the all-around final, Joura was in the stands filming them on a camera she'd received for appearing on a Channel 7 talk show and speaking about her experiences.

Joura's ankle injury sustained in Beijing did not heal naturally in the nine months it was given to do so. she must now undergo ankle reconstruction surgery which will end her 2009 season.

Joura underwent two surgeries in 2009 and it for a number of months retirement seemed likely. However, in early 2010 it was announced that she was back in the gym and was attempting a comeback. Her injuries proved too much for her to overcome, and on 6 November 2010, Joura officially announced her retirement from elite gymnastics.

After a rest after the injury, she returned to competition in 2012, but did not make the Australian Olympic team for London.
