= Dominique Pegg =

Canadian artistic gymnast

- Nickname: Dom
- Born: May 24, 1995 (age 31) London, Ontario, Canada

Gymnastics career
- Discipline: Women's artistic gymnastics
- Country represented: Canada
- College team: Alabama Crimson Tide
- Club: Bluewater Gymnastics Club
- Head coach: David Brubaker
- Assistant coach: Elizabeth Brubaker
- Music: "Rhythm All Night" by Tabla Master
Medal record
Representing Canada
Pacific Rim Championships
Gold medal – first place	2010 Melbourne	Vault
Canadian Championships
Gold medal – first place	2010 Kamloops	Floor
Silver medal – second place	2010 Kamloops	Vault
Silver medal – second place	2010 Kamloops	Balance Beam
Silver medal – second place	2011 Charlottetown	Uneven Bars
Silver medal – second place	2011 Charlottetown	Floor
Silver medal – second place	2012 Regina	All Around
Bronze medal – third place	2009 Hamilton	All Around
Bronze medal – third place	2009 Hamilton	Uneven Bars
Bronze medal – third place	2010 Kamloops	All Around
Bronze medal – third place	2012 Regina	Vault
Bronze medal – third place	2012 Regina	Balance Beam
Canada Winter Games
Gold medal – first place	2007 Whitehorse	Vault

Dominique Pegg (born May 24, 1995) is a Canadian artistic gymnast and competed at the 2012 Summer Olympics.

== Junior career ==
=== 2007 ===
In May, Pegg competed at the Canadian Championships in Regina, Saskatchewan. She placed fifth in the all around final with a score of 54.650. In event finals, she placed first on vault scoring 14.125, fourth on uneven bars scoring 13.200, and third on balance beam scoring 15.000.

In November, Pegg was a member of the Canadian team to place second at the Junior Pan American Championships in Guatemala City, Guatemala. She finished sixth in the all around with a score of 55.717. In event finals, Pegg placed first on vault scoring 13.925, fifth on uneven bars scoring 13.750, and seventh on balance beam scoring 12.850.

=== 2008 ===
In June, Pegg competed at the Canadian Championships in Calgary, Canada. She won the all around competition with a score of 55.700. In event finals, Pegg placed first on vault scoring 13.700, first on uneven bars 14.050, third on balance beam scoring 13.800, and second on floor scoring 13.950.

=== 2009 ===
In June, Pegg competed at the Canadian Championships in Hamilton, Canada in the senior division. She placed third in the all around final with a score of 53.650. In event finals, she placed seventh on vault scoring 13.450, third on uneven bars scoring 13.500, and eighth on floor scoring 11.550.

== Senior career ==
=== 2010 ===
In March, Pegg placed seventh in the American Cup in Worcester, United States with a score of 55.150. Before the event she told International Gymnast Magazine, "The main focus for me is to get the most experience at this level of competition that I possibly can, perform my routines like I would every day in my gym and enjoy the moment."

In April, Pegg competed at the Pacific Rim Championships in Melbourne, Australia. The Canadian team finished fourth and individually Pegg placed eighth all around with a score of 53.600. In event finals, she won the gold medal on vault with a score of 13.850 and placed seventh on balance beam with a score of 13.100.

In May, Pegg competed at the Canadian Championships in Kamloops, Canada. She placed third in the all around with a score of 54.800. In event finals, Pegg placed second on vault scoring 13.825, fifth on uneven bars scoring 12.800, second on balance beam scoring 14.000, and first on floor scoring 14.100.

=== 2011 ===
In May, Pegg placed seventh in the all around competition at the Canadian Championships in Charlottetown, Canada with a score of 51.575. In event finals, she placed second on uneven bars scoring 13.250, fifth on balance beam scoring 13.050, and second on floor scoring 13.650.

In October, Pegg was a member of the Canadian team at the 2011 World Artistic Gymnastics Championships in Tokyo, Japan. She contributed an all around score of 52.032 toward the team's score. They placed eleventh in the team competition which meant that they would have to compete in London in January in order to qualify a full team for the Olympics.

Later in October Pegg was supposed to compete at the Pan American Games but broke a bone in her right hand before the competition.

=== 2012 ===
In March, Pegg competed at the Artistic Gymnastics World Cup event in Cottbus, Germany. She placed fifth on vault with a score of 13.537, eighth on balance beam with a score of 11.950, and third on floor with a score of 13.725. "My performance in Cottbus was a comeback competition from my hand injury," said Pegg. "I was just focusing on getting back into the competition mode and trying some new routines. The good result has given me the confidence I needed to help myself get back out there again."

In April, Pegg participated in the 2nd Artistic Gymnastics Meeting in San Bernardo, Brazil with gymnasts from Brazil, Canada, and South Korea. She finished second on floor with a score of 14.050.

In May, Pegg competed at the Canadian Championships in Regina, Canada. She tied for second place in the all around competition with a score of 56.300. In event finals, Pegg placed third on vault scoring 14.275 and third on balance beam scoring 13.950.

This summer, Pegg hopes to be part of the five member team that Canada will send to the 2012 Summer Olympics. She told International Gymnast Magazine, "I'm not letting the pressure of making the team get to me, because the pressure will always be there. I can't make it go away. I can only continue to focus the way I have been over the years, such as being in the best shape of my career and pushing myself to my highest level in the gym. I have been working really hard in the gym trying to upgrade all my routines. I'm confident that my hard work will pay off, and I will be able to help out my team to the best of my ability."

At the end of June, Pegg was one of the twelve gymnasts chosen to compete at the Final Olympic Selection meet in Gatineau, Canada On the first day of competition she placed sixth in the all around with a score of 52.050. Based on her performances here and at the Canadian Championships she was selected to the five member Olympic team. She said, "The first day was a little shaky because of all the pressure but this is what we’ve been working for our whole lives. We do what we love and what we need to do to get through it all."

==== London Olympics ====
In July, Pegg competed at the 2012 Summer Olympics in London, United Kingdom. She helped the Canadian team qualify to the team finals and individually she qualified to the all around final in seventeenth place with a score of 55.657. After qualifications, Pegg said, "I feel so blessed to be here, I still just can’t believe it. Just to have our names announced out there, it kind of left me breathless. Team all-around was our biggest goal, we were really focusing on the team." In the team final, she contributed scores of 14.400 on vault, 13.500 on balance beam, and 13.966 on floor toward the Canadian team's fifth-place finish. In the all around final, Pegg placed seventeenth with a score of 55.565.

== College career ==
Pegg signed with the University of Alabama in July 2013 and competed in the NCAA in 2014. Alabama has won 6 National Titles including back-to-back championships in 2011 and 2012.

Pegg was removed from the Alabama roster in 2015 after two years of battling injury and little competition time. In 2017, Pegg completed a degree at the University of Alabama in Kinesiology and Exercise Science.
