= Talia Chiarelli =

Canadian artistic gymnast

- Full name: Talia Chiarelli
- Born: May 12, 1995 (age 31) Ottawa, Ontario

Gymnastics career
- Discipline: Women's artistic gymnastics
- Country represented: Canada
- College team: Michigan Wolverines (Class of 2017)
- Club: Bluewater Gymnastics Club, Brestyan's American Gymnastics Club
- Head coaches: Elizabeth Brubaker (CA), Mihai Brestyan (USA)
- Assistant coach: David Brubaker
Medal record
Pan American Games
Silver medal – second place	2011 Guadalajara	Team
Canadian Championships
Bronze medal – third place	2011 Charlottetown	Floor

Talia Chiarelli (born May 12, 1995) is a Canadian artistic gymnast. In 2006, she moved with her family to Boston and trains at Brestyan's Gymnastics in Burlington, Massachusetts, but still represents the Bluewater Gymnastics Club in competition. She is the daughter of former Boston Bruins and Edmonton Oilers general manager Peter Chiarelli.

== Junior career ==
Born in Ottawa, Chiarelli trained from 1999-2006 at the Nepean-Corona School of Gymnastics. When her father accepted the position of GM for the Boston Bruins, she moved to Boston and began training with Brestyan's Gymnastics.

=== 2008 - 2010 ===
Because Chiarelli is Canadian but lives in Boston and trains at an American club, she has been able to compete at both the US and Canadian national championships. She competed level 10 (US) in 2008 then became a junior international elite and competed at the US Junior National Championships in 2009 and 2010. Chiarelli's club in Canada is listed as Bluewater Gymnastics of Sarnia, Ontario.

== Senior career ==
=== 2011 ===
In May, Chiarelli competed at the Canadian Championships in Charlottetown, Canada. She placed sixth in the all around final with a score of 52.375. In event finals, she placed eighth on balance beam scoring 12.175 and third on floor scoring 13.525.

Later that year, she was chosen to represent Canada at the Japan Cup and later was chosen as an alternate to the Canadian Team at the 2011 World Championships.

In October, Chiarelli competed at the 2011 Pan American Games in Guadalajara, Mexico. She helped the Canadian team win the silver medal in the team event with an individual all around score of 52.625. This score gave her 13th place in the all around competition. In event finals, she placed fifth on balance beam with a score of 13.075.

=== 2012 ===
In January, Chiarelli participated in the London Prepares series where Canada qualified a full team to the 2012 Summer Olympics. She competed on vault scoring 14.500, balance beam scoring 13.400, and floor scoring 13.433.

In April, Chiarelli competed at the 2nd Artistic Gymnastics Meeting in San Bernardo, Brazil, with gymnasts from Brazil, Canada, and South Korea. She won the floor final with a score of 14.225.

In June, Chiarelli was one of the twelve gymnasts chosen to compete at the Final Olympic Selection meet to decide who would represent Canada at the 2012 Summer Olympics, but she had to withdraw due to back problems.

=== 2013 ===
In her first major competition since discovering that she had stress fractures in her lower back, at the 2013 Elite Canada held in Edmonton, Alberta, Chiarelli was 5th on vault and 1st on beam

Chiarelli accepted a full scholarship to the University of Michigan. In her sophomore year, Chiarelli was named a two-time All-American for her Balance Beam and Floor Exercise. She was also named to the Big-Ten First Team as she guided the Wolverines to an NCAA Championship. In her senior year at the University of Michigan, Chiarelli was named team captain alongside Nicole Artz and helped the team win a Big Ten Championship title for the fourth year in a row.
