= Artistic gymnastics at the 2007 Canada Games =

== Men's team competition ==
Gold	Silver	Bronze
British Columbia	Alberta	Ontario

=== Final standings ===
Rank	Team	Floor	Horse	Rings	Vault	P. Bars	High Bar	Total Score
1	British Columbia	50.450	44.900	48.850	50.600	49.350	50.450	294.600
2	Alberta	48.900	44.950	48.600	50.050	50.000	49.500	292.000
3	Ontario	49.050	46.050	48.700	50.850	48.900	47.350	290.900
4	Quebec	48.950	47.500	48.450	49.900	48.100	47.550	290.450
5	Saskatchewan	47.550	40.500	47.650	49.650	45.450	47.050	277.850
6	Manitoba	47.550	40.500	47.650	49.650	45.450	43.850	273.150
7	Nova Scotia	44.950	42.000	44.200	48.700	46.150	43.050	269.050
8	Prince Edward Island	46.500	39.150	42.000	47.550	44.000	43.400	262.600
9	New Brunswick	21.850	27.900	27.750	23.600	28.150	27.300	156.550
10	Newfoundland and Labrador	43.900	9.400	18.650	46.550	8.550	14.400	141.450
	Northwest Territories	DNS	DNS	DNS	DNS	DNS	DNS	
	Nunavut	DNS	DNS	DNS	DNS	DNS	DNS	
	Yukon	DNS	DNS	DNS	DNS	DNS	DNS	

== Women's team competition ==
Gold	Silver	Bronze
Quebec	British Columbia	Ontario

=== Final standings ===
Rank	Team	Vault	Uneven Bars	Beam	Floor	Total Score
1	Quebec	57.550	53.800	57.950	56.300	225.600
2	British Columbia	59.800	51.150	57.750	55.600	225.600
3	Ontario	58.650	49.800	58.800	56.200	223.450
4	Saskatchewan	54.900	49.150	56.600	53.750	214.400
5	Alberta	56.150	48.250	55.650	52.900	212.950
6	Manitoba	54.500	45.550	54.700	50.700	205.450
7	New Brunswick	55.050	43.000	53.250	53.050	204.350
8	Nova Scotia	53.600	44.400	53.400	49.650	201.050
9	Yukon	49.050	35.200	42.250	44.150	170.650
10	Prince Edward Island	47.300	33.500	43.900	45.800	170.500
11	Newfoundland and Labrador	49.850	31.350	43.450	45.350	170.000
	Northwest Territories	DNS	DNS	DNS	DNS	
	Nunavut	DNS	DNS	DNS	DNS	

== Men's Floor Exercise ==
Gold	Silver	Bronze
(Ontario) Kevin Lytwyn	(Ontario) Matt Lubrick	(Saskatchewan) Jayd Lukenchuk

=== Final standings ===
1. (Ontario) Kevin Lytwyn: 13.00
2. (Ontario) Matt Lubrick: 12.70
3. (Saskatchewan) Jayd Lukenchuk: 12.65
4. (Alberta) Christian Nuttall: 12.65
5. (British Columbia) Danny Chambers: 12.60
6. (Quebec) Luc Blanchet: 12.25
7. (British Columbia) Spencer Dear: 12.15
8. (Alberta) Mattson Moore: 12.05

== Men's Pommel Horse ==
Gold	Silver	Bronze
(British Columbia) Alexander Hoy	(Quebec) Gabriel Boucher	(Saskatchewan) Anderson Loran

=== Final standings ===
1. (British Columbia) Alexander Hoy: 12.45
2. (Quebec) Gabriel Boucher: 12.35
3. (Saskatchewan) Anderson Loran: 12.10
4. (Alberta) Mattson Moore: 12.00
5. (Manitoba) Aaron Boila: 12.00
6. (Ontario) Jaroslav Hojka: 11.30
7. (Ontario) Simon Porter: 11.00
8. (Quebec) Maxime Simard: 11.00

== Men's Rings ==
Gold	Silver	Bronze
(Saskatchewan) Jayd Lukenchuk	(Ontario) Kevin Lytwyn	(British Columbia) Danny Chambers

=== Final standings ===
1. (Saskatchewan) Jayd Lukenchuk: 13.35
2. (Ontario) Kevin Lytwyn: 13.15
3. (British Columbia) Danny Chambers: 13.05
4. (Quebec) Vincent Pelletier: 12.80
5. (British Columbia) Alexander Hoy: 12.15
6. (Ontario) Simon Barbosa: 12.05
7. (Alberta) Ian Galvan: 12.00
8. (Manitoba) Aaron Boila: 11.15

== Men's Vault ==
Gold	Silver	Bronze
(Ontario) Kevin Lytwyn	(Saskatchewan) Jayd Michal J. Lukencuk	(Nova Scotia) Liam James Hawkins

=== Final standings ===
1. (Ontario) Kevin Lytwyn: 13.3000
2. (Saskatchewan) Jayd Michal J. Lukenchuk: 13.000
3. (Nova Scotia) Liam James Hawkins: 12.900
4. (British Columbia) Trevor William Nagy: 12.850
5. (British Columbia) Danny Ron Chambers: 12.800
6. (Alberta) Ian Mark Galvan: 12.750
7. (Manitoba) Francois Lansard: 12.750
8. (Ontario) Matt Lubrick: 12.550

== Men's Parallel Bars ==
Gold	Silver	Bronze
(Saskatchewan) Jayd Michal J. Lukencuk	(British Columbia) Alexander Hoy	(Ontario) Kevin Lytwyn

=== Final standings ===
1. (Saskatchewan) Jayd Michal J. Lukencuk: 13.15
2. (British Columbia) Alexander Hoy: 12.95
3. (Ontario) Kevin Lytwyn: 12.95
4. (Alberta) Jackson Payne: 12.50
5. (Alberta) Mattson Moore: 12.40
6. (Ontario) Gregory Roe: 12.35
7. (British Columbia) Danny Chambers: 11.50
8. (Quebec) Maxime Simard: 11.45

== Men's Horizontal Bar ==
Gold	Silver	Bronze
(British Columbia) Spencer Dear	(Ontario) Kevin Lytwyn	(Alberta) Jackson Payne

=== Final standings ===
1. (British Columbia) Spencer Dear: 13.15
2. (Ontario) Kevin Lytwyn: 12.75
3. (Alberta) Jackson Payne: 12.70
4. (Alberta) Kyle Ryley: 12.55
5. (Saskatchewan) Jayd Lukenchuk: 12.40
6. (Saskatchewan) Anderson Loran: 12.30
7. (Ontario) Jaroslav Hojka: 12.10
8. (British Columbia) Alexander Hoy: 11.60

== Women's Floor Exercise ==
Gold	Silver	Bronze
(British Columbia) Alycia Chan	(Ontario) Amanda Fuller	(British Columbia) Nicole Pineau

=== Final standings ===
1. (British Columbia) Alycia Chan: 15.00
2. (Ontario) Amanda Fuller: 14.90
3. (British Columbia) Nicole Pineau: 14.45
4. (Saskatchewan) Alexandra Picton: 14.30
5. (Quebec) Marion Potvin: 13.70
6. (Alberta) Stephanie McGregor: 13.55
7. (Quebec) Emmanuelle Harvey: 13.45
8. (Ontario) Dominique Pegg: 13.15

== Women's Vault ==
Gold	Silver	Bronze
(Ontario) Dominique Pegg	(British Columbia) Hannah Karina Swift	(British Columbia) Alycia Maria Chan

=== Final standings ===
1. (Ontario) Dominique Pegg: 15.400
2. (British Columbia) Hannah Karina Swift: 15.200
3. (British Columbia) Alycia Maria Chan: 15.050
4. (Quebec) Marion Potvin: 14.950
5. (Quebec) Catherine Dion: 14.850
6. (Ontario) Amanda Jaclyn Fuller: 14.850
7. (Saskatchewan) Megan Jennifer Halback: 14.600
8. (New Brunswick) Jessica MacCallum: 13.900

== Women's Uneven Bars ==
Gold	Silver	Bronze
(British Columbia) Brittany Rogers	(Quebec) Mélissa Corbo	(Quebec) Marion Potvin

=== Final standings ===
1. (British Columbia) Brittany Rogers: 15.00
2. (Quebec) Mélissa Corbo: 13.80
3. (Quebec) Marion Potvin: 13.60
4. (Saskatchewan) Kim Genereux: 13.25
5. (Ontario) Dominique Pegg: 12.90
6. (Manitoba) Melissa Clark: 12.50
7. (Saskatchewan) Alexandra Picton: 11.80
8. (Ontario) Nicole Heikkila: 10.55

== Women's Beam ==
Gold	Silver	Bronze
(British Columbia) Brittany Rogers	(Alberta) Kelsey Lang	(Ontario) Nicole Heikkila

=== Final standings ===
1. (British Columbia) Brittany Rogers: 15.30
2. (Alberta) Kelsey Lang: 14.85
3. (Ontario) Nicole Heikkila: 14.60
4. (Ontario) Dominique Pegg: 14.55
5. (Saskatchewan) Alexandra Picton: 14.50
6. (Manitoba) Sarah Flett: 14.05
7. (Quebec) Stéphanie Desjardins-Labelle: 13.65
8. (Quebec) Catherine Dion: 12.60
