= Madeline Gardiner =

Canadian artistic gymnast

- Born: January 27, 1995 (age 31) Cambridge, Ontario

Gymnastics career
- Discipline: Women's artistic gymnastics
- Country represented: Canada
- College team: Oregon State Beavers
- Club: Dynamo Gymnastics
- Head coach: Elvira Saadi
- Assistant coaches: Sarah Rainey and Vladimir Kondratenko
- Music: Dark Eyes
- Eponymous skills: aerial cartwheel with change of legs (balance beam)
- Retired: June 8, 2017
Medal record
Pacific Rim Championships
Bronze medal – third place	2010 Melbourne	Balance Beam
Canadian Championships
Gold medal – first place	2011 Charlottetown	All Around
Silver medal – second place	2010 Kamloops	All Around
Silver medal – second place	2010 Kamloops	Uneven Bars
Silver medal – second place	2011 Charlottetown	Balance Beam
Silver medal – second place	2012 Regina	Balance Beam

Madeline Gardiner (born January 27, 1995) is a Canadian retired artistic gymnast and an alternate for the 2012 Summer Olympics team.

== Junior career ==
=== 2010 ===
In April, Gardiner competed at the Pacific Rim Championships in Melbourne, Australia. She placed fourth in the all around competition with a score of 53.400, which also helped the Canadian team to place fourth. In event finals, she placed fifth on vault scoring 13.675, seventh on uneven bars scoring 12.800, third on balance beam scoring 14.425, seventh on floor scoring 12.625.

In May, Gardiner competed in the senior division of the Canadian Championships in Kamloops, Canada. She placed second in the all around final with a score of 55.100. In event finals, she placed fourth on vault scoring 13.375, second on uneven bars scoring 13.950, fifth on balance beam scoring 13.250, and seventh on floor scoring 13.150.

In August, Gardiner competed at the 2010 Summer Youth Olympics in Singapore. She placed thirteenth in the all around final with a score of 51.100. In event finals, she placed fifth on vault scoring 13.587 and eighth on uneven bars scoring 9.900.

== Senior career ==
=== 2011 ===
In May, Gardiner competed at the Canadian Championships in Charlottetown, Canada. She placed first in the all around final with a score of 54.475 and second in the balance beam final with a score of 13.300.

In June, Gardiner left Cambridge Kip gymnastics club to move to Dynamo Gymnastics, a new club opened by her longtime coach, Elvira Saadi.

In October, Gardiner competed at the 2011 World Artistic Gymnastics Championships. She helped the Canadian team place eleventh with scores of 13.066 on uneven bars, 12.933 on balance beam, and 12.766 on floor.

=== 2012 ===
In January, Gardiner competed at the London Prepares series where Canada qualified a full team to the 2012 Summer Olympics. She contributed scores of 13.500 on uneven bars, 14.133 on balance beam, and 13.300 on floor. She placed fourth in the balance beam final with a score of 14.266. She said, "I had no expectations going in. I just wanted to have a good routine and I had added a double turn instead of a full, so I just wanted to hit my routine and where I placed would come. Coming fourth even was a surprise to me and I was happy about that."

In May, Gardiner competed at the Canadian Championships in Regina, Canada. She placed fifth in the all around finals with a score of 54.350. In event finals, she placed fourth on uneven bars scoring 13.350 and second on balance beam scoring 14.400.

This summer, Gardiner hopes to be chosen as part of the five member team that will represent Canada at the 2012 Summer Olympics. After she helped Canada qualify a full team in January, Gardiner said, "I'm glad that I could help make the team anyways, even if I don't make it on. I'll still be happy I was a part of it and a part of helping Canada qualify the team. I still would love to be on the team. I'm trying to take the focus off making the team and put the focus on everyday doing what I need to and take it a day or a week at a time."

At the end of June, Gardiner was one of the twelve gymnasts chosen to compete at the Final Olympic Selection meet in Gatineau, Canada. On the first day of competition she placed eighth in the all around with a score of 51.250. Based on her performances here and at the Canadian Championships she was named as the second reserve for the team that will compete at the 2012 Summer Olympics.

== Collegiate career ==
Gardiner has competed for the Oregon State Beavers and has won two national bronze medals on beam in 2014 and 2015.
