= Brittany Rogers =

Canadian artistic gymnast

- Full name: Brittany Rogers
- Born: June 8, 1993 (age 33) New Westminster, British Columbia, Canada
- Height: 165 cm (5 ft 5 in)

Gymnastics career
- Discipline: Women's artistic gymnastics
- Country represented: Canada
- College team: Georgia Gym Dogs (2013–16)
- Club: Calgary Gymnastics Centre
- Head coaches: Cody Casey and Janna Ball
- Former coaches: David Kenwright, Dorina Stan, Vladimir Lashin and Svetlana Lashina
Medal record
Representing Canada
Commonwealth Games
| Gold medal – first place | 2018 Gold Coast | Team |
| Silver medal – second place | 2018 Gold Coast | Uneven Bars |
Pacific Rim Championships
| Silver medal – second place | 2006 Honolulu | Team |
| Silver medal – second place | 2008 San Jose | Team |
| Silver medal – second place | 2016 Everett | Team |
| Silver medal – second place | 2016 Everett | Vault |
| Bronze medal – third place | 2016 Everett | Uneven Bars |
Pan American Games
| Bronze medal – third place | 2007 Rio de Janeiro | Team |
Summer Universiade
| Gold medal – first place | 2017 Taipei | Vault |
| Silver medal – second place | 2017 Taipei | Team |

Brittany Rogers (born June 8, 1993) is a Canadian artistic gymnast who competed at the 2012 Summer Olympics. She attended the University of Georgia and competed for the Georgia Gym Dogs. Consequently, combining both elite and college gymnastics without deferral, Rogers is one of very few gymnasts to have undertaken this combination – vying for a spot on the 2016 Summer Olympics team.

== Junior career ==
=== 2006 ===
In April, Rogers competed at the Pacific Rim Championships in Honolulu, Hawaii, United States. She contributed an all around score of 55.050 toward the Canadian team's second-place finish.

In May, Rogers competed at the Canadian Championships in Quebec City, Quebec, Canada. She placed fifth in the all around final with a score of 52.350. In event finals, she placed first on vault scoring 13.850, third on uneven bars scoring 13.250, fifth on balance beam scoring 13.550, and fourth on floor scoring 14.050.

=== 2007 ===
In May, Rogers competed at the Canadian Championships in Regina, Saskatchewan, Canada. She won the junior all around final with a score of 57.550. In event finals, she placed fourth on vault scoring 13.525, second on uneven bars scoring 14.550, and second on floor scoring 14.350.

=== 2008 ===
In March, Rogers competed at the Pacific Rim Championships in San Jose, California, United States. She contributed an all around score of 56.875 toward the Canadian team's second-place finish. In event finals, she placed third on vault scoring 14.625, third on uneven bars scoring 14.575, and eighth on balance beam scoring 13.825.

In June, Rogers competed in the senior division of the Canadian Championships in Calgary, Alberta, Canada. She placed sixth in the all around final with a score of 54.850. In event finals she placed fourth on vault scoring 13.950 and sixth on uneven bars scoring 14.200.

== Senior career ==
=== 2009 ===
In February, Rogers placed ninth at the American Cup in Chicago, Illinois, United States with an all around score of 52.600. "I didn't do as well as I had hoped at the American Cup, but things happen for a reason, and you need bad days to have good days," Rogers said. "There's always something you can learn."

In June, Rogers was expected to compete and the Canadian Championships in Hamilton, Ontario, Canada but was forced to withdraw due to a rib injury. "I popped my rib out a few times in warm up, which caused all the muscles to spasm around that area," Rogers told International Gymnast Magazine. "Expected recovery time for now is unknown, but it's already feeling better, which hopefully means I won't be off for much longer and get right back on track for Worlds."

In October, Rogers competed at the 2009 World Artistic Gymnastics Championships in London, United Kingdom. She placed nineteenth in the all around final with a score of 53.075, the highest of any Canadian women. In event finals, she placed seventh on vault with score of 14.200.

=== 2010 ===
In April, Rogers competed at the Pacific Rim Championships in Melbourne, Australia. She helped the Canadian Team finish in fourth place with a vault scoring 14.000. She fractured her medial malleolus bone in her right ankle during a dismount on balance beam. "I was put in a fiberglass cast for one month and then transferred into a walking air cast which I'm still in," she said. "Unfortunately it's not healing as well as we would all like. It's still fractured due to the way the bone is broken off. The bone is too small to pin surgically, and would be a difficult reconstructive surgery."

In November, Rogers had surgery on her ankle because it was not healing naturally. She said, "Gymnastics is the biggest part of my life, and it was far from easy missing almost a full season of competitions. I have the best support system behind me, who have helped me tremendously by keeping me focused and in shape, gearing up to get back at it and be the best I can be."

=== 2011 ===
In February, Rogers was able to resume training. "After seeing the surgeon again recently, he gave me the go-ahead to start increasing my training load with no restrictions, which was pretty exciting news after hearing doctors telling me to hold back and take it easy for nine months. There's no set time or date that I'll be training full-force. I'm just taking it day by day, but I'll be back at it very soon! I have a great physio(therapist) and orthopod (orthopedist) who are working with me with rehab."

In May, Rogers competed at the Canadian Championships in Charlottetown, Canada. She placed fourth in the all around final with a score of 53.000.

In November, Rogers competed at the Artistic Gymnastics World Cup in Osijek, Croatia. She placed second on vault scoring 13.863, fourth on uneven bars scoring 13.700, eighth on balance beam scoring 12.000, and fifth on floor scoring 13.150.

=== 2012 ===
In January, Rogers participated in the London Prepares series where Canada qualified a full team to the 2012 Summer Olympics. She competed on vault scoring 14.200 and uneven bars scoring 13.433.

In March, Rogers competed at the Artistic Gymnastics World Cup in Cottbus, Germany. She placed first of vault with a score of 13.962 and third on balance beam with a score of 13.525.

In April, Rogers participated in the 2nd Artistic Gymnastics Meeting in San Bernardo, Brazil with gymnasts from Brazil, Canada, and South Korea. She finished second in the all around competition with a score of 55.500. In event finals, she placed third on vault scoring 13.838 and first on uneven bars scoring 14.150.

In May, Rogers competed at the Canadian Championships in Regina, Canada. She placed sixth in the all around final with a score of 54.200. In event finals, she placed second on vault scoring 14.425, fifth on uneven bars scoring 13.200, and fifth on balance beam scoring 13.250.

At the end of June, Rogers was one of the twelve gymnasts chosen to compete at the Final Olympic Selection meet in Gatineau, Canada On the first day of competition she placed third in the all around with a score of 54.300. Based on her performances here and at the Canadian Championships she was selected to the five member Olympic team. Rogers said, "I knew I had a solid performance this week but I didn't know how close I was and as soon as they announced my name I wanted to drop. I've worked so hard for this and I'm really glad that all that hard work has paid off. It's a dream come true. It's incredible."

==== London Olympics ====
At the end of July, Rogers competed at the 2012 Summer Olympics in London, United Kingdom. She helped the Canadian team qualify to the team final and individually she qualified to the vault final with a score of 14.483. After qualifications, Rogers said, "We're just so, so excited. As soon as I saw we were sixth I knew we were in. I was sitting with my parents. Then I jumped out of my seat and ran over to hug my teammates. I mean, we're making history. That is so cool. There are twenty thousand people in here. That's a lot of people. That can be intimidating. I just looked around and took it all in. I had shivers. I think everyone handled it tremendously. It could've gone a lot worse. We all have strengths and weaknesses and I think we put those aside and did it for the team. We have nothing to lose now. The worst we can be is eighth and that's still an accomplishment in itself. I know we can only go up from here because we had our struggles on beam so now we know what we need to improve on. We're just going to come out and rock (on Tuesday). This is just so amazing. I really don't have words to describe the feeling." In the team final, she contributed scores of 14.866 on vault and 14.466 on uneven bars toward the Canadian team's fifth-place finish. In the vault final, Rogers placed seventh with a score of 14.483. She said, "I didn't get a gold medal, but it was so much fun out there."

=== 2015 ===
In September 2015, Gymnastics Canada named Rogers to their World Championships Team. She represented Canada at the 2015 World Artistic Gymnastics Championships in Glasgow as a part of the Canadian team that finished in 6th place. In the team final Rogers contributed on every event except floor scoring 15.000 on vault, 13.200 on uneven bars and 13.700 on the balance beam. As of 2015 Rogers trains at the Calgary Gymnastics Centre under David Kenwright and Janna Ball.

=== 2016 ===
In June, Rogers continued her stellar performances throughout the Canadian Olympics team selection process to cinch her spot on a second Olympic Team.

==== 2016 Rio Olympics ====
On August 7, 2016, Canada began their competition at the Rio Olympics with qualifications. Canada competed in the last (5th) subdivision starting on the balance beam. Rogers competed on beam, vault and uneven bars. Rogers hit both her beam routine and vaults. Rogers was last up for Canada on uneven bars with a spot in team finals on the line. Unfortunately she fell on her van leeuwen and Canada missed team finals by 0.168. Rogers did not qualify to any event finals. Despite a tough Olympic experience, Rogers said that she will continue competing as long as her body will allow her, and will try to make the Canadian team for the 2017 Artistic Gymnastics World Championships, as Canada will host these Championships. She and Rio Olympic teammate Rose Woo ended up being named the alternates to these championships, with Olympians Ellie Black, Shallon Olsen and Isabela Onyshko along with first year senior Brooklyn Moors comprising the main team.
