= Monica Covacci =

Canadian artistic gymnast

Monica Covacci (born December 8, 1971) is a Canadian former artistic gymnast. She competed at the 1988 Summer Olympics.

Covacci was born in Agincourt, Toronto, Ontario.
