= Lise Arsenault =

Canadian gymnast

Lise Arsenault-Goertz
Personal information
- Born: 14 December 1954 (age 71) Cartierville, Quebec, Canada

Sport
- Sport: Gymnastics

Lise Arsenault (born 14 December 1954) was a Canadian gymnast who competed in team gymnastics at the 1972 Summer Olympics and the 1976 Summer Olympics in Montreal.

In the 1976 games, she helped the Canadian women's gymnastics team finish ninth, its best-ever Olympic placing up to that time, but she failed to qualify for individual competition. She lived in Brampton at the time.
