= Kristina Vaculik =

Canadian artistic gymnast

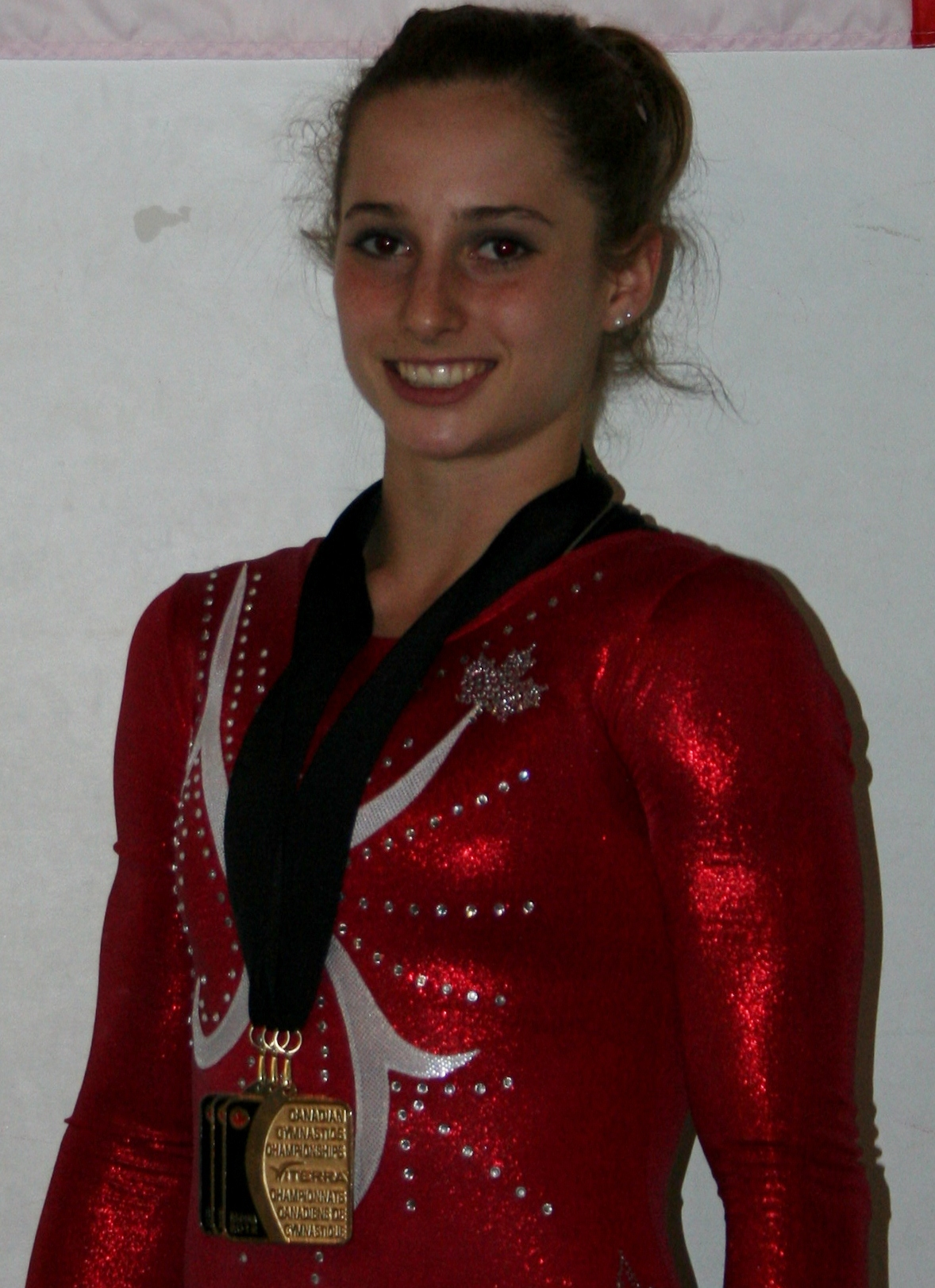
- Vaculik at the 2012 Canadian Gymnastics Championships

Personal information
- Born: July 9, 1992 (age 34) Toronto, Ontario
- Height: 149 cm (4 ft 11 in)

Gymnastics career
- Discipline: Women's artistic gymnastics
- Country represented: Canada
- College team: Stanford Cardinal
- Club: Gemini Gymnastics
- Head coaches: Yelena Davydova; Valery Yahchybekov
- Choreographer: Ruth Moriana
- Music: "Monserrat" by Orquesta Del Plata
Medal record
Representing Canada
Pacific Rim Championships
Silver medal – second place	2008 San Jose	Team
Silver medal – second place	2008 San Jose	Uneven bars
Bronze medal – third place	2010 Melbourne	Floor exercise
Bronze medal – third place	2012 Everett	Team
Pan American Games
Silver medal – second place	2011 Guadalajara	Team
Silver medal – second place	2011 Guadalajara	Balance beam
Bronze medal – third place	2011 Guadalajara	All-around
Pan American Championships
Silver medal – second place	2010 Guadalajara	Team
Bronze medal – third place	2010 Guadalajara	Uneven bars
Bronze medal – third place	2010 Guadalajara	Floor exercise

Kristina Vaculik (born July 9, 1992) is a Canadian artistic gymnast who represented Canada at the 2012 Summer Olympics. In 2011–2012, Vaculik took a year off from Stanford University, which she attended on a gymnastics scholarship, to train full-time for the Olympics.

== Junior career ==
=== 2006 ===
In April, Vaculik competed at the Pacific Rim Championships in Honolulu, United States. The Canadian team placed second and individually Vaculik placed fifth with an all-around score of 57.450. In event finals, she placed third on uneven bars scoring 14.500, seventh on balance beam scoring 14.050, and sixth on floor scoring 14.550.

In May, Vaculik won the all-around title at the Canadian Championships in Quebec City, Canada with a score of 57.95. In event finals, she placed third on vault scoring 13.55, first on uneven bars scoring 14.65, second on balance beam scoring 14.60, and first on floor scoring 14.65.

=== 2007 ===
In May, Vaculik won the all-around title at the Canadian Championships in Regina, Canada with a score of 58.650. In event finals, she placed second on vault scoring 13.925 and sixth on uneven bars scoring 13.450.

In September, Vaculik competed at the 2007 World Artistic Gymnastics Championships in Stuttgart, Germany. She contributed a score of 56.000 towards the Canadian team's fourteenth-place finish.

== Senior career ==
=== 2008 ===
In March, Vaculik competed at the Pacific Rim Championships in San Jose, United States. She led the Canadian team to a silver medal finish and individually she placed sixth with an all-around score of 58.425. In event finals, Vaculik placed eighth on vault scoring 13.462, second on uneven bars scoring 15.225, and sixth on balance beam scoring 14.775.

In April, Vaculik competed at the Artistic Gymnastics World Cup in Maribor, Slovenia. She placed second on uneven bars, scoring 14.850, and first on balance beam, scoring 14.957.

In May, Vaculik competed at the Artistic Gymnastics World Cup in Tianjin, China. She placed eighth on uneven bars scoring 14.075, sixth on balance beam scoring 15.000, and seventh on floor scoring 13.900.

At the end of May, Vaculik competed at the Artistic Gymnastics World Cup in Moscow, Russia. She placed eighth on uneven bars, scoring 14.025, and fourth on floor, scoring 14.275.

In June, Vaculik won the silver medal in the all-around competition at the Canadian Championships in Calgary, Canada with a score of 57.200. In event finals, she placed first on vault scoring 14.050, first on uneven bars scoring 15.600, second on balance beam scoring 15.500, and second on floor scoring 14.800. Vaculik said, "I just want to enjoy myself and have a good competition. It's been very tiring with all the traveling and different time zones and it's also been hard to work on new skills."

Canada qualified only two spots for the 2008 Summer Olympics and used a points system to decide which gymnasts would represent Canada. Vaculik placed third in the points system which meant that she was the reserve gymnast and not able to compete at the Olympics. Throughout the selection process Vaculik suffered from osteochondritis dissecans in her right elbow. After the Canadian Championships, she decided to take time off to allow it to heal. In December she had surgery on her elbow and took a year away from competition for rehabilitation.

=== 2009 ===
In December, Vaculik returned to competition at Elite Canada in Oakville, Canada. She placed second in the all-around final with a score of 52.950. In event finals, she placed first on uneven bars scoring 14.150 and tied for first on floor scoring 13.900. "I didn't have any expectations going into my first major competition after a one year absence," she said, "I just wanted to experience competition again and feel through my routines in a competitive frame of mind. I wanted to prove to myself that I still have what it takes mentally and physically to compete and belong with the best gymnasts in Canada."

=== 2010 ===
In March, Vaculik competed at the Artistic Gymnastics World Cup in Cottbus, Germany. She placed second on vault scoring 13.787, first on uneven bars scoring 14.050, second on balance beam scoring 14.425, and first on floor scoring 13.950.

At the end of April, Vaculik competed at the Pacific Rim Championships in Melbourne, Australia, where the Canadian team placed fourth. Individually, Vaculik placed sixth in the all around with a score of 54.900, fourth in the vault final with a score of 13.600, fourth in the uneven bars final with a score of 14.225, sixth in the balance beam final with a score of 13.350, and third in the floor final with a score of 13.925.

In May, Vaculik won the all-around title at the Canadian Championships in Kamloops, Canada with a score of 55.950. In events finals, she placed first on vault scoring 14.000, first on uneven bars scoring 14.050, first on balance beam scoring 14.200, and second on floor scoring 13.950.

In October, Vaculik led the Canadian team at the 2010 World Artistic Gymnastics Championships in Rotterdam, Netherlands, with the team's highest all-around score of 52.065. The team placed thirteenth and individually Vaculik placed thirtieth.

=== 2011 ===
In October, Vaculik was a member of the Canadian team at the 2011 World Artistic Gymnastics Championships in Tokyo, Japan. They placed eleventh in the team competition which meant that they would have to compete in London in January to qualify a full team for the Olympics. She contributed an all around score of 52.831 in qualifications.

Later in October, Vaculik competed in the 2011 Pan American Games in Guadalajara, Mexico. She helped the Canadian team win silver in the team event with an individual all-around score of 54.625. Vaculik won the bronze medal in the individual all around final with a score of 54.777 and the silver medal in the balance beam final with a score of 13.925. She also placed fourth in the floor final with a score of 13.500.

=== 2012 ===
In January, Vaculik competed at the London Prepares series where Canada qualified a full team to the 2012 Summer Olympics. She contributed an all around score of 54.707 and placed fourth in the uneven bars finals scoring 14.466.

In February, Vaculik won the all-around competition at Elite Canada in Mississauga, Canada with a score of 56.350. In event finals, she placed fourth on vault scoring 13.975, second on uneven bars scoring 14.100, second on balance beam scoring 14.200, and third on floor scoring 13.750.

At the Pacific Rim Championships in March, Vaculik was part of the Canadian team that won the bronze medal. She placed seventh in the all around competition scoring 55.100, seventh in the balance beam final scoring 12.825, and tied for sixth in the uneven bars final scoring 13.600.

In May, Vaculik competed at the Canadian Championships in Regina, Canada. She won the all-around title with a score of 56.700. In event finals, Vaculik placed fourth on vault scoring 14.225, first on uneven bars scoring 14.400, first on balance beam scoring 14.600, and second on floor scoring 14.000.

As the Olympics approached, Vaculik hoped to be selected for the five-member team representing Canada at the 2012 Summer Olympics. "It's still kind of surreal because I've worked basically my whole gymnastics career for this and actually to know that I have a really good chance of going now is just an amazing feeling," Vaculik said. "So, now every day in the gym, I'm just so happy to be there and to be working towards that."

At the end of June, Vaculik was one of the twelve gymnasts chosen to compete at the Final Olympic Selection meet in Gatineau, Quebec. Unfortunately, her friend and fellow selection event team member Peng-Peng Lee had been forced to withdraw from the selection process due to an injury to her ACL, which she had sustained during practice before the Canadian National Championships in May. On the first day of competition she placed first in the all around with a score of 55.150. Based on her performances here and at the Canadian Championships she was selected to the five member Olympic team. "It's just an incredible feeling," said Vaculik. "I've wanted to go to the Olympics for a long time. Now I'm just going to be working hard every day, marking down the time to the Olympics and being really excited about what I'm doing."

==== London Olympics ====
At the end of July, Vaculik competed at the 2012 Summer Olympics in London, United Kingdom. She helped the Canadian team qualify to the team final and individually she qualified as the third reserve to the all around final with a score of 53.566. After qualifications, Vaculik said, "I'm at a loss for words. I am so proud of these girls. We had incredible performances, and it's so amazing to be here right now." In the team final, she contributed scores of 14.166 on uneven bars and 13.433 on balance beam toward the Canadian team's fifth-place finish. This is the highest placement the Canadian team has ever achieved at the Olympics.
