= Ekaterina Baturina (gymnast) =

Russian artistic gymnast

- Full name: Ekaterina Sergeyevna Baturina
- Born: 29 April 1997 (age 29)

Gymnastics career
- Discipline: Women's artistic gymnastics
- Country represented: Russia
- Head coach: Evgenyi Grebenkin
Medal record
Representing Russia
European Championships
Gold medal – first place	2012 Brussels	Team (junior)

Ekaterina Sergeyevna Baturina (Russian: Екатерина Сергеевна Батурина; born April 29, 1997) is a Russian artistic gymnast. She represented Russia at the 2012 Pacific Rim Championships and 2012 Junior European Championships.

== Junior career ==
Baturina is known to be a good beam specialist, boasting a 6.4 start value as early as November 2010, and achieving the silver medal behind the younger Bondareva at 2011 December's Voronin Cup.

Baturina began competing internationally at the 2012 City of Jesolo Trophy, where she helped the junior Russian team win the bronze medal. She also competed at the Pacific Rim Championships in Everett, USA, but did not medal. In April, she competed at the European Championships and helped the junior Russian team win the gold medal.

== Senior career ==
Baturina's senior debut came in 2013. Her first international assignment was the Anadia World Cup, held in Portugal, a CIII competition. She competed in floor and balance beam in qualifications and earned a spot for the beam finals. She ended up 8th in beam final after not fulfilling the two jumps connection requirement, lowering her D score to a 4.9.
