= Christina McDonald (gymnast) =

Canadian artistic gymnast

- Full name: Christina Anne McDonald Fritz
- Born: 1969 (age 56–57) Oshawa, Ontario, Canada

Gymnastics career
- Discipline: Women's artistic gymnastics
- Country represented: Canada (Canadian National)
- College team: University of Florida
- Head coaches: Leonid Grakovsky, Debbie Vidmar
- Retired: 1993

Christina Anne McDonald Fritz (born 1969), née Christina Anne McDonald, is a former college and international gymnast from Canada.

McDonald made her international debut at the International Japan Juniors in 1983, placing seventh all-around. She had continued success in the mid-1980s, and was a member of Canada's Olympic team at the 1988 Summer Olympics in Seoul, Korea.

McDonald accepted an athletic scholarship to attend the University of Florida in Gainesville, Florida, where she was a member of coach Ernestine Weaver's Florida Gators women's gymnastics team in National Collegiate Athletic Association (NCAA) competition from 1989 to 1992. In the opening meet of the Gators' 1989 season, she tore her Anterior cruciate ligament (ACL) on a beam dismount. She returned to competition with the Gators the following season, but chose not to do the vault. McDonald graduated from the University of Florida with a bachelor's degree in health science education in 1993.

McDonald has worked as a missionary at E.W.T.N., Global Catholic Network starting in 2001 - 2010. McDonald married in 2007 in the United States, and took the name "Fritz" as her married name.

== Rankings ==
=== 1983 ===
- International Japan Juniors: 7th AA

=== 1984 ===
- Champions All: 4th AA

=== 1985 ===
- Elite Canada: 2nd AA
- American Cup: 7th AA
- Canadian Nationals: 3rd AA, 3rd V
- Belgian Gym Masters: 5th AA, 1st UB
- World Championships: 9th T, 26th AA

=== 1986 ===
- Canadian Nationals: 2nd AA, 2nd BB, 2nd FX

=== 1987 ===
- Canadian Nationals: 3rd AA, 5th V, 5th UB, 1st BB, 5th FX
- World Championships: 8th T

=== 1988 ===
- Canadian Olympic Trials
- Olympic Games: 11th T

== See also ==
- Florida Gators
- List of University of Florida alumni
- List of University of Florida Olympians
