= Crystal Gilmore =

Canadian artistic gymnast

- Born: 8 April 1983 (age 43)

Gymnastics career
- Discipline: Women's artistic gymnastics
- Country represented: Canada (2006)

Crystal Gilmore (born 8 April 1983) is a Canadian artistic gymnast, representing her nation at international competitions.

She participated at the 2000 Summer Olympics. She also competed at world championships, including the 2006 World Artistic Gymnastics Championships in Aarhus, Denmark.
