= Amelie Plante =

Canadian artistic gymnast

- Born: 22 September 1983 (age 42) Joliette, Quebec, Canada
- Height: 158 cm (5 ft 2 in)

Gymnastics career
- Discipline: Women's artistic gymnastics
- Country represented: Canada (2004)

Amelie Plante (born 22 September 1983) is a Canadian female artistic gymnast, representing her nation at international competitions. She participated at the 2004 Summer Olympics.
