= Karen Kelsall =

- Born: December 11, 1962 (age 63) Nanaimo, British Columbia

Gymnastics career
- Discipline: Women's artistic gymnastics
- Country represented: Canada
- College team: University of California, Berkeley
- Former coaches: Dick Mulvihill; Linda Mulvihill
Medal record
Commonwealth Games
Gold medal – first place	1978 Edmonton	Team
Bronze medal – third place	1978 Edmonton	All-around (tie)

Karen Barbara Kelsall (born December 11, 1962) is a Canadian chiropractor and a retired gymnast and dancer. She was the youngest competitor at the 1976 Summer Olympics in Montreal and was one of the first Canadian gymnasts to attract attention from the international gymnastics community.

== Career ==
=== Early career ===
Kelsall began gymnastics training at around the age of nine. Although born in Canada, she spent a significant portion of her gymnastics career training in the United States. Her mother, dissatisfied with her progress at a Vancouver gymnastics club, sent her to train under coach Dick Mulvihill in Oregon. Kelsall quickly advanced, eventually ranking in the top five by the Canadian Gymnastics Federation, despite previously not even being considered for the Olympic team. She trained under Dick and Linda Mulvihill, who were pioneering the use of video analysis and mechanical spotting equipment in gymnastics training at the time.

=== Senior career ===
She was the junior Canadian national champion in 1976, the senior National Champion in 1977 and 1980, and the British Columbian champion in 1977. She represented Canada at various international competitions from 1975 through 1980, including the 1975 Pan Am Games, where she placed thirteenth in the all-around; the 1977 American Cup, where she was the all-around bronze medalist; the 1978 World Championships and the 1978 Commonwealth Games, where she was a member of the gold medal-winning Canadian team and tied for the bronze medal in the all-around.

In 1976, the thirteen-year-old Kelsall placed third at the Canadian Olympic Trials. FIG regulations at the time required gymnasts to be fourteen years old by the start of the Olympics, although she was permitted to participate as she turned fourteen in the same calendar year and was the youngest competitor representing Canada. She trained up to 8 hours a day while attending school for a half a day. At the Olympics, Kelsall placed 27th in the all-around out of around 100 gymnasts, but was a key member of the ninth-place Canadian team.

Kelsall made notable an element on the balance beam, known as the vertical split but became popularly referred to as the "Kelsall Stretch" around 1978. This flexibility skill involves standing on one foot on the beam while performing a split and reaching back to grab the other leg. Kelsall was the first North American gymnast to perform the vertical split in competition.

Kelsall expressed enthusiasm at the opportunity to compete at the 1980 Summer Olympics in Moscow, remarking that due to her young age, she felt she had missed out on some activities at the 1976 Summer Olympics in Montreal. However, Canada participated in the 1980 Summer Olympics boycott, and as such, Kelsall did not have the opportunity to attend a second Olympic Games. She moved on to college, where she competed as an NCAA gymnast for the University of California, Berkeley for four years.

== Later life ==
After her undergraduate work and a brief career as a professional dancer, Kelsall returned to university. She is currently a chiropractor in the Pacific Northwest, with additional certification in massage therapy and other modalities.

Kelsall was featured in the book "The Making of a Gymnast: The Karen Kelsall Story" (1978) authored by Jean Boulogne.
