= Nansy Damianova =

Canadian artistic gymnast

- Full name: Nansy Damianova
- Born: March 30, 1991 (age 35) Sèvres, France

Gymnastics career
- Discipline: Women's artistic gymnastics
- Country represented: Canada
- Club: Gymnix
- Head coach: Katerine Dussault
- Music: Collecting The Ballots And My Family Is My Life by James Horner

Nansy Damianova (born March 30, 1991, in Sèvres, France) is a Canadian artistic gymnast. She represented Canada at the 2008 Summer Olympics.
