= Canadian Gymnastics Championships =

Annual gymnastics competition

The Canadian Gymnastics Championships is the annual national gymnastics competition held in Canada. It features artistic gymnastics, rhythmic gymnastics, trampolining, and tumbling.

Year	Location
1991	Saskatoon, Saskatchewan
1992	Quebec City, Quebec
1993	Calgary, Alberta
1994	Charlottetown, Prince Edward Island
1995	Vancouver, British Columbia
1996	Sault Ste. Marie, Ontario
1997	Ottawa, Ontario
1998	Hamilton, Ontario
1999	Burnaby, British Columbia
2000	Montreal, Quebec
2001	Saint John, New Brunswick
2002	Winnipeg, Manitoba
2003	Saskatoon, Saskatchewan
2004	Mississauga, Ontario
2005	Vancouver, British Columbia
2006	Quebec City, Quebec
2007	Regina, Saskatchewan
2008	Calgary, Alberta
2009	Hamilton, Ontario
2010	Kamloops, British Columbia
2011	Charlottetown, Prince Edward Island
2012	Regina, Saskatchewan
