= Brazil at the World Artistic Gymnastics Championships =

- Flag of Brazil
- IOC code: BRA
- National federation: Confederação Brasileira de Ginástica
- Website: www.cbginastica.com.br
- Medals Ranked 17th: Gold 9 Silver 9 Bronze 9 Total 27

Brazil competes at the World Artistic Gymnastics Championships since the 1966 edition of the tournament. Brazil's governing body in Gymnastics is the Brazilian Gymnastics Confederation (Portuguese: Confederação Brasileira de Ginástica – CBG), established in 1978, which selects athletes to compete at official FIG competitions, including the World Artistic Gymnastics Championships.

== Medalists ==
Medal	Name	Year	Event
Silver	Daniele Hypólito	(Belgium) 2001 Ghent	Women's floor exercise
Gold	Daiane dos Santos	(United States) 2003 Anaheim	Women's floor exercise
Gold	Diego Hypólito	(Australia) 2005 Melbourne	Men's floor exercise
Silver	Diego Hypólito	(Denmark) 2006 Aarhus	Men's floor exercise
Gold	Diego Hypólito	(Germany) 2007 Stuttgart	Men's floor exercise
Bronze	Jade Barbosa	(Germany) 2007 Stuttgart	Women's individual all-around
Bronze	Jade Barbosa	(Netherlands) 2010 Rotterdam	Women's vault
Silver	Arthur Zanetti	(Japan) 2011 Tokyo	Still rings
Bronze	Diego Hypólito	(Japan) 2011 Tokyo	Men's floor exercise
Gold	Arthur Zanetti	(Belgium) 2013 Antwerp	Still rings
Silver	Arthur Zanetti	(China) 2014 Nanjing	Still rings
Bronze	Diego Hypólito	(China) 2014 Nanjing	Men's floor exercise
Silver	Arthur Zanetti	(Qatar) 2018 Doha	Still rings
Gold	Arthur Mariano	(Germany) 2019 Stuttgart	Horizontal bar
Gold	Rebeca Andrade	(Japan) 2021 Kitakyushu	Women's vault
Silver	Rebeca Andrade	(Japan) 2021 Kitakyushu	Uneven bars
Gold	Rebeca Andrade	(United Kingdom) 2022 Liverpool	Women's individual all-around
Bronze	Rebeca Andrade	(United Kingdom) 2022 Liverpool	Women's floor exercise
Bronze	Arthur Mariano	(United Kingdom) 2022 Liverpool	Horizontal bar
Silver	Rebeca Andrade, Jade Barbosa, Lorrane Oliveira, Flávia Saraiva, Júlia Soares, Carolyne Pedro	(Belgium) 2023 Antwerp	Women's team
Silver	Rebeca Andrade	(Belgium) 2023 Antwerp	Women's individual all-around
Gold	Rebeca Andrade	(Belgium) 2023 Antwerp	Women's vault
Bronze	Rebeca Andrade	(Belgium) 2023 Antwerp	Balance beam
Silver	Rebeca Andrade	(Belgium) 2023 Antwerp	Women's floor exercise
Bronze	Flávia Saraiva	(Belgium) 2023 Antwerp	Women's floor exercise
Gold	Rebeca Andrade	(Netherlands) 2026 Rotterdam	Women's vault
Bronze	Flávia Saraiva	(Netherlands) 2026 Rotterdam	Balance beam

== Medal tables ==
=== By gender ===
Gender	Gold	Silver	Bronze	Total
Women	5	5	6	16
Men	4	4	3	11

=== By event ===
Event	Gold	Silver	Bronze	Total
Women's vault	3	0	1	4
Men's floor exercise	2	1	2	5
Still rings	1	3	0	4
Women's floor exercise	1	2	2	5
Women's individual all-around	1	1	1	3
Horizontal bar	1	0	1	2
Uneven bars	0	1	0	1
Women's team	0	1	0	1
Balance beam	0	0	2	2

=== By athlete ===
Athlete	Gold	Silver	Bronze	Total
Rebeca Andrade	3	4	2	9
Diego Hypólito	2	1	2	5
Arthur Zanetti	1	3	0	4
Arthur Mariano	1	0	1	2
Daiane dos Santos	1	0	0	1
Flávia Saraiva	0	1	2	3
Jade Barbosa	0	1	2	3
Carolyne Pedro	0	1	0	1
Daniele Hypólito	0	1	0	1
Júlia Soares	0	1	0	1
Lorrane Oliveira	0	1	0	1

== Participants ==
=== Men's Artistic Gymnastics ===
- 1978: Gilmárcio Sanches, Hélio Araújo, João Francisco Levy, João Luís Ribeiro, Mário Thomaz, Ulisses Schlosser
- 1979: Gilmárcio Sanches, Hélio Araújo, João Francisco Levy, João Luís Ribeiro, Luís Tadeu Braga, Reinaldo Calinsque
- 1981: Fernando Moreira, Gilmárcio Sanches, João Francisco Levy, João Luís Ribeiro, João Machado, Pedro Ruhs
- 1983: Carlo Sabino, Gerson Gnoatto, Gilmárcio Sanches, Guilherme Pinto, João Luís Ribeiro, Pedro Ruhs
- 1985: Carlos Fulcher, Guilherme Pinto, João Francisco Levy, Marcos Monteiro, Pedro Ruhs, Ricardo Nassar
- 1987: Carlo Sabino, Carlos Fulcher, Gerson Gnoatto, Guilherme Pinto, Marcos Monteiro, Ricardo Nassar
- 1989: Adriano Engelke, André Ortale, Carlo Sabino, Marcos Monteiro, Ricardo Nassar
- 1991: Adriano Engelke, André Monteiro, Genaro Severino, Gilberto Figueira, Irano Carvalho, Marco Monteiro
- 1992: Gilberto Figueira, José Mário Barbuto, Marco Monteiro
- 1994: Gilberto Figueira, José Mário Barbuto, Kléber Sato, Marco Monteiro
- 1995: Heron Bambirra, José Mário Barbuto, Marco Monteiro
- 1996: César Jardim, Cristiano Albino, Felippe Mendonça, Gustavo Barreto, Marco Monteiro, Roger Medina
- 1997: Charley Malewschik, Heron Bambirra, Mosiah Rodrigues
- 1999: Charley Malewschik, Kléber Sato, Mosiah Rodrigues
- 2001: Charley Malewschik, Danilo Nogueira, Maximiliano Monte, Michel Conceição, Mosiah Rodrigues, Vitor Camargo
- 2002: Diego Hypólito, Gustavo Lobo, Mosiah Rodrigues, Victor Rosa
- 2003: Danilo Nogueira, Diego Hypólito, Michel Conceição, Mosiah Rodrigues, Victor Rosa, Vitor Camargo
- 2005: Adan Santos, Danilo Nogueira, Diego Hypólito, Mosiah Rodrigues
- 2006: Caio Costa, Diego Hypólito, Luiz Anjos, Michel Conceição, Mosiah Rodrigues, Victor Rosa
- 2007: Arthur Zanetti, Danilo Nogueira, Diego Hypólito, Luiz Anjos, Mosiah Rodrigues, Victor Rosa
- 2009: Arthur Zanetti, Caio Costa, Diego Hypólito, Mosiah Rodrigues, Sérgio Sasaki, Victor Rosa
- 2010: Danilo Nogueira, Felipe Polato, Francisco Barretto Júnior, Mosiah Rodrigues, Pericles Silva, Sérgio Sasaki
- 2011: Arthur Zanetti, Diego Hypólito, Francisco Barretto Júnior, Pericles Silva, Petrix Barbosa, Sérgio Sasaki
- 2013: Arthur Nory, Arthur Zanetti, Diego Hypólito, Francisco Barretto Júnior, Pericles Silva, Sérgio Sasaki
- 2014: Arthur Nory, Arthur Zanetti, Diego Hypólito, Francisco Barretto Júnior, Lucas Bitencourt, Sérgio Sasaki
- 2015: Arthur Nory, Arthur Zanetti, Caio Souza, Diego Hypólito, Francisco Barretto Júnior, Lucas Bitencourt
- 2017: Arthur Nory, Arthur Zanetti, Caio Souza
- 2018: Arthur Nory, Arthur Zanetti, Caio Souza, Francisco Barretto Júnior, Lucas Bitencourt
- 2019: Arthur Nory, Arthur Zanetti, Caio Souza, Francisco Barretto Júnior, Lucas Bitencourt
- 2021: Arthur Nory, Arthur Zanetti, Caio Souza
- 2022: Arthur Nory, Caio Souza, Diogo Soares, Lucas Bitencourt, Yuri Guimarães Alternate: Patrick Sampaio
- 2023: Arthur Nory, Bernardo Actos, Diogo Soares, Patrick Sampaio, Yuri Guimarães Alternate: Arthur Zanetti

=== Women's Artistic Gymnastics ===
- 1966: Marion Dullius
- 1978: Lilian Carrascoza, Maria Cristina Coutinho, Silvia dos Anjos, Cláudia Magalhães, Marian Fernandes, Gisele Radomsky
- 1979: Silvia dos Anjos, Lilian Carrascoza, Marian Fernandes, Cláudia Magalhães, Jacqueline Pires, Altair Prado
- 1981: Danilce Campos, Lilian Carrascoza, Carine Leão, Cláudia Magalhães, Jacqueline Pires, Altair Prado
- 1983: Danilce Campos, Marian Fernandes, Tatiana Figueiredo, Cláudia Magalhães, Jacqueline Pires, Altair Prado
- 1985: Marian Fernandes, Tatiana Figueiredo, Elena Fournogerakis, Vanda Oliveira, Jacqueline Pires, Altair Prado
- 1987: Marian Fernandes, Tatiana Figueiredo, Vanda Oliveira, Luisa Parente, Priscilla Steinberger, Margaret Yada
- 1989: Adriane Andrade, Anna Fernandes, Anna Paula Luck, Daniela Mesquita, Luisa Parente, Margaret Yada
- 1991: Debora Biffe, Marina Fagundes, Anna Fernandes, Luisa Parente
- 1992: Debora Biffe, Viviane Cardoso, Luisa Parente
- 1993: Soraya Carvalho
- 1994: Silvia Mendes, Adriana Silami, Leticia Ishii
- 1995: Soraya Carvalho, Beatriz Degani, Mariana Gonçalves, Leticia Ishii, Liliane Koreipasu, Beatrice Martins, Melissa Sugimote
- 1996: Soraya Carvalho, Beatrice Martins, Leticia Ishii, Mariana Gonçalves
- 1997: Patricia Aoki, Mariana Gonçalves
- 1999: Heine Araújo, Camila Comin, Marilia Gomes, Daniele Hypólito, Stefani Salani, Daiane dos Santos
- 2001: Heine Araújo, Coral Borda, Camila Comin, Daniele Hypólito, Stefani Salani, Daiane dos Santos
- 2002: Camila Comin, Daniele Hypólito, Caroline Molinari
- 2003: Camila Comin, Daniele Hypólito, Caroline Molinari, Ana Paula Rodrigues, Daiane dos Santos, Laís Souza
- 2005: Camila Comin, Daniele Hypólito, Daiane dos Santos
- 2006: Camila Comin, Bruna da Costa, Daniele Hypólito, Daiane dos Santos, Juliana Santos, Laís Souza
- 2007: Jade Barbosa, Khiuani Dias, Daniele Hypólito, Daiane dos Santos, Ana Cláudia Silva, Laís Souza
- 2009: Bruna Leal, Khiuani Dias, Ethiene Franco, Priscila Cobello
- 2010: Jade Barbosa, Priscila Cobello, Ethiene Franco, Adrian Gomes, Daniele Hypólito, Bruna Leal Alternate: Gabriela Soares
- 2011: Jade Barbosa, Adrian Gomes, Daniele Hypólito, Bruna Leal, Daiane dos Santos, Ana Cláudia Silva Alternate: Priscila Cobello
- 2013: Leticia Costa, Daniele Hypólito
- 2014: Leticia Costa, Isabelle Cruz, Daniele Hypólito, Maria Cecília Cruz, Mariana Oliveira, Julie Sinmon Alternate: Mariana Valentin
- 2015: Jade Barbosa, Daniele Hypólito, Thauany Lee, Letícia Costa, Flávia Saraiva, Lorrane Oliveira Alternate: Lorenna Antunes
- 2017: Rebeca Andrade, Thais Fidelis
- 2018: Jade Barbosa, Rebeca Andrade, Thais Fidelis, Flávia Saraiva, Lorrane Oliveira Alternate: Anna Júlia Reis
- 2019: Jade Barbosa, Letícia Costa, Thais Fidelis, Flávia Saraiva, Lorrane Oliveira Alternate: Isabel Barbosa
- 2021: Rebeca Andrade
- 2022: Rebeca Andrade, Flávia Saraiva, Lorrane Oliveira, Júlia Soares, Carolyne Pedro Alternate: Christal Bezerra
- 2023: Rebeca Andrade, Flávia Saraiva, Lorrane Oliveira, Júlia Soares, Jade Barbosa Alternate: Carolyne Pedro
- 2025: Júlia Coutinho, Flávia Saraiva, Júlia Soares, Sophia Weisberg

== Junior World medalists ==
Medal	Name	Year	Event
Silver	Diogo Soares	(Hungary) 2019 Győr	Boys' rings
