= Gymnastics at the South American Games =

Different gymnastics disciplines have been contested at the South American Games. Artistic gymnastics has been part of the program since 1978. Rhythmic gymnastics was first introduced in 1990. Trampoline gymnastics entered the program in 2018.

== Editions ==
Sport	1978	1982	1986	1990	1994	1998	2002	2006	2010	2014	2018	2022	2026
Artistic gymnastics	X	X	X	X	X	X	X	X	X	X	X	X	X
Rhythmic gymnastics				X	X	X	X	X	X	X	X	X	X
Trampoline											X	X	X

== All-time medal table ==
1978–2022
Rank	Nation	Gold	Silver	Bronze	Total
1	Brazil (BRA)	116	78	40	234
2	Argentina (ARG)	66	83	74	223
3	Colombia (COL)	22	18	29	69
4	Venezuela (VEN)	17	28	31	76
5	Chile (CHI)	14	21	32	67
6	Peru (PER)	2	6	10	18
7	Ecuador (ECU)	0	1	6	7
8	Panama (PAN)	0	1	1	2
9	Uruguay (URU)	0	1	0	1
10	Bolivia (BOL)	0	0	2	2
Totals (10 entries)		237	237	225	699

== Best results by event and nation ==
Event		ARG	BOL	BRA	CHI	COL	ECU	PAN	PER	URU	VEN
M A G
M A G	Team	1st place, gold medalist(s)		1st place, gold medalist(s)	3rd place, bronze medalist(s)	1st place, gold medalist(s)	3rd place, bronze medalist(s)		2nd place, silver medalist(s)		1st place, gold medalist(s)
M A G	Individual All-Around	1st place, gold medalist(s)		1st place, gold medalist(s)	1st place, gold medalist(s)	1st place, gold medalist(s)					1st place, gold medalist(s)
M A G	Floor Exercise	1st place, gold medalist(s)		1st place, gold medalist(s)	1st place, gold medalist(s)	1st place, gold medalist(s)	2nd place, silver medalist(s)		3rd place, bronze medalist(s)		1st place, gold medalist(s)
M A G	Pommel Horse	1st place, gold medalist(s)		1st place, gold medalist(s)	1st place, gold medalist(s)	1st place, gold medalist(s)	3rd place, bronze medalist(s)				1st place, gold medalist(s)
M A G	Still Rings	1st place, gold medalist(s)	3rd place, bronze medalist(s)	1st place, gold medalist(s)	1st place, gold medalist(s)	1st place, gold medalist(s)					1st place, gold medalist(s)
M A G	Vault	1st place, gold medalist(s)		1st place, gold medalist(s)	1st place, gold medalist(s)				2nd place, silver medalist(s)	2nd place, silver medalist(s)	1st place, gold medalist(s)
M A G	Parallel Bars	1st place, gold medalist(s)		1st place, gold medalist(s)	1st place, gold medalist(s)	1st place, gold medalist(s)			2nd place, silver medalist(s)		1st place, gold medalist(s)
M A G	Horizontal Bar	1st place, gold medalist(s)		1st place, gold medalist(s)	1st place, gold medalist(s)	1st place, gold medalist(s)	3rd place, bronze medalist(s)				1st place, gold medalist(s)
W A G
W A G	Team	1st place, gold medalist(s)	3rd place, bronze medalist(s)	1st place, gold medalist(s)	2nd place, silver medalist(s)	2nd place, silver medalist(s)			2nd place, silver medalist(s)		2nd place, silver medalist(s)
W A G	Individual All-Around	1st place, gold medalist(s)		1st place, gold medalist(s)	1st place, gold medalist(s)						1st place, gold medalist(s)
W A G	Vault	1st place, gold medalist(s)		1st place, gold medalist(s)	1st place, gold medalist(s)	1st place, gold medalist(s)	3rd place, bronze medalist(s)	2nd place, silver medalist(s)	2nd place, silver medalist(s)		3rd place, bronze medalist(s)
W A G	Uneven Bars	1st place, gold medalist(s)		1st place, gold medalist(s)	1st place, gold medalist(s)	1st place, gold medalist(s)					1st place, gold medalist(s)
W A G	Balance Beam	1st place, gold medalist(s)		1st place, gold medalist(s)	1st place, gold medalist(s)	3rd place, bronze medalist(s)			1st place, gold medalist(s)		1st place, gold medalist(s)
W A G	Floor Exercise	1st place, gold medalist(s)		1st place, gold medalist(s)	1st place, gold medalist(s)	2nd place, silver medalist(s)	3rd place, bronze medalist(s)	3rd place, bronze medalist(s)	1st place, gold medalist(s)		1st place, gold medalist(s)
R G
R G	Team	1st place, gold medalist(s)		1st place, gold medalist(s)					3rd place, bronze medalist(s)		2nd place, silver medalist(s)
R G	Individual All-Around	1st place, gold medalist(s)		1st place, gold medalist(s)		3rd place, bronze medalist(s)					2nd place, silver medalist(s)
R G	Hoop	1st place, gold medalist(s)		1st place, gold medalist(s)		3rd place, bronze medalist(s)					3rd place, bronze medalist(s)
R G	Ball	1st place, gold medalist(s)		1st place, gold medalist(s)		2nd place, silver medalist(s)					2nd place, silver medalist(s)
R G	Clubs	1st place, gold medalist(s)		1st place, gold medalist(s)		3rd place, bronze medalist(s)					2nd place, silver medalist(s)
R G	Ribbon	1st place, gold medalist(s)		1st place, gold medalist(s)	3rd place, bronze medalist(s)						3rd place, bronze medalist(s)
R G	Rope	1st place, gold medalist(s)		1st place, gold medalist(s)							2nd place, silver medalist(s)
R G	Group All-Around	3rd place, bronze medalist(s)		1st place, gold medalist(s)							2nd place, silver medalist(s)
R G	Group Single Apparatus	2nd place, silver medalist(s)		1st place, gold medalist(s)	3rd place, bronze medalist(s)						1st place, gold medalist(s)
R G	Group Mixed Apparatus	3rd place, bronze medalist(s)		1st place, gold medalist(s)		3rd place, bronze medalist(s)					1st place, gold medalist(s)
T T	Men's Individual	2nd place, silver medalist(s)		2nd place, silver medalist(s)		1st place, gold medalist(s)					3rd place, bronze medalist(s)
T T	Women's Individual	3rd place, bronze medalist(s)		1st place, gold medalist(s)		2nd place, silver medalist(s)					

== See also ==
- South American Gymnastics Championships
