= 2004 Junior Pan American Artistic Gymnastics Championships =

International sports competition

Junior Pan American Artistic Gymnastics Championships
- Location: San Salvador, El Salvador
- Date: October 14–18, 2004

The 2004 Junior Pan American Artistic Gymnastics Championships was held in San Salvador, El Salvador, October 14–18, 2004.

== Medal summary ==
Event	Gold	Silver	Bronze
Women
Team	United States; Bianca Flohr; Morgan Evans; Natasha Kelley; Kassi Price	Canada; Elyse Hopfner-Hibbs; Rebecca Simbhudas; Alyssa Brown; Jennifer Lezen	Brazil; Jade Barbosa; Thais Cevada; Bruna da Costa; Caroline Tanaka
All Around	Kassi Price (USA)	Elsa García (MEX)	Natasha Kelley (USA)
Vault	Natasha Kelley (USA)	Jade Barbosa (BRA)	Alyssa Brown (CAN)
Uneven bars	Bianca Flohr (USA)	Kassi Price (USA)	Elsa García (MEX)
Balance beam	Natasha Kelley (USA)	Elyse Hopfner-Hibbs (CAN)	Kassi Price (USA)
Floor exercise	Jade Barbosa (BRA)	Bianca Flohr (USA)	Kassi Price (USA)
Men
Team	United States; Cole Storer; Kyson Bunthowong; Seung Tai Lee; Bryan Del Castillo	Brazil; Diego Hypólito; Victor Rosa; Luiz Anjos; Caio Costa	Puerto Rico; Luis Rivera; Tommy Ramos; Reynaldo Oquendo; Gabriel Morales
All Around	Gerardo Medina (CUB)	Darwin Griman (VEN) Bryan Del Castillo (USA)	—
Floor exercise	Diego Hypólito (BRA)	Caio Costa (BRA)	Santiago Lopez (MEX) Bryan Del Castillo (USA)
Pommel horse	Darwin Griman (VEN)	Mynor Oliva (GUA)	Kyson Bunthowong (USA)
Rings	Tommy Ramos (PUR) Roberto Fiallos (ESA)	—	Seung Tai Lee (USA)
Vault	Diego Hypólito (BRA)	Luis Rivera (PUR)	Gerardo Medina (CUB)
Parallel bars	Darwin Griman (VEN)	Tommy Ramos (PUR) Victor Rosa (BRA) Gerardo Medina (CUB)	—
Horizontal bar	Gerardo Medina (CUB)	Bryan Del Castillo (USA)	Fabian Meza (COL)

== Medal table ==
Rank	Nation	Gold	Silver	Bronze	Total
1	United States (USA)	6	4	6	16
2	Brazil (BRA)	3	4	1	8
3	Cuba (CUB)	2	1	1	4
4	Venezuela (VEN)	2	1	0	3
5	Puerto Rico (PUR)	1	2	1	4
6	El Salvador (ESA)	1	0	0	1
7	Canada (CAN)	0	2	1	3
8	Mexico (MEX)	0	1	2	3
9	Guatemala (GUA)	0	1	0	1
10	Colombia (COL)	0	0	1	1
Totals (10 entries)		15	16	13	44
