= Brazil men's national artistic gymnastics team =

Gymnastics team

Brazil
- Continental union: Pan-American Gymnastics Union
- National federation: Brazilian Gymnastics Federation

Olympic Games
- Appearances: 2

World Championships
- Appearances: ?

The Brazil men's national artistic gymnastics team represents Brazil in FIG international competitions.

== History ==
Brazil has participated in the Olympic Games men's team competition twice. It has also participated in the men's team competition at the World Artistic Gymnastics Championships ? times. At the 2012 Olympic Games, Arthur Zanetti became the first Brazilian to win an Olympic medal in men's artistic gymnastics, winning gold in the rings.

== Current roster ==
Name	Birthdate and age	Birthplace	Club
Arthur Nory	September 18, 1993 (age 33)	Campinas, SP	Esporte Clube Pinheiros (ECP) - SP
Bernardo Actos	May 28, 1999 (age 27)	Sete Lagoas, MG	Minas Tênis Clube (MTC) - MG
Caio Souza	September 12, 1993 (age 33)	Volta Redonda, RJ	Minas Tênis Clube (MTC) - MG
Diogo Soares	April 12, 2002 (age 24)	Piracicaba, SP	Clube de Regatas do Flamengo (CRF) - RJ
Johnny Oshiro			Sociedade Esportiva Recreativa e Cultural (SERC) - SP
Lucas Bitencourt	March 12, 1994 (age 32)	Americana, SP	Minas Tênis Clube (MTC) - MG
Patrick Sampaio	September 7, 2002 (age 24)	Resende, RJ	Esporte Clube Pinheiros (ECP) - SP
Tomás Florêncio	April 25, 2000 (age 26)		Sociedade Esportiva Recreativa e Cultural (SERC) - SP
Vitaliy Guimaraes	May 18, 2000 (age 26)	Dallas, Texas, US	Minas Tênis Clube (MTC) - MG
Yuri Guimarães	July 25, 2003 (age 23)	SP	Sociedade Esportiva Recreativa e Cultural (SERC) - SP

== Team competition results ==
=== Olympic Games ===
Year	Position	Squad
1896 through 2012 — did not participate
2016	6th place	Francisco Barretto Júnior, Diego Hypólito, Arthur Nory, Sérgio Sasaki, Arthur Zanetti
2020	9th place	Francisco Barretto Júnior, Arthur Nory, Diogo Soares, Caio Souza
2024	—N/a	did not qualify

=== World Championships ===
Year	Position	Squad
1989	24th place	
1991	25th place	
1994 through 1999 — did not participate
2001	23rd place	Charley Malewschik, Danilo Nogueira, Maximiliano Monte, Michel Conceição, Mosiah Rodrigues, Vitor Camargo
2003	19th place	Danilo Nogueira, Diego Hypólito, Michel Conceição, Mosiah Rodrigues, Victor Rosa, Vitor Camargo
2006	18th place	Caio Costa, Diego Hypólito, Luiz Anjos, Michel Conceição, Mosiah Rodrigues, Victor Rosa
2007	17th place	Arthur Zanetti, Danilo Nogueira, Diego Hypólito, Luiz Anjos, Mosiah Rodrigues, Victor Rosa
2010	19th place	Danilo Nogueira, Felipe Polato, Francisco Barretto Júnior, Mosiah Rodrigues, Pericles Silva, Sérgio Sasaki
2011	13th place	Arthur Zanetti, Diego Hypólito, Francisco Barretto Júnior, Pericles Silva, Petrix Barbosa, Sérgio Sasaki
2014	6th place	Arthur Nory, Arthur Zanetti, Diego Hypólito, Francisco Barretto Júnior, Lucas Bitencourt, Sérgio Sasaki
2015	8th place	Arthur Nory, Arthur Zanetti, Caio Souza, Diego Hypólito, Francisco Barretto Júnior, Lucas Bitencourt
2018	7th place	Arthur Nory, Arthur Zanetti, Caio Souza, Francisco Barretto Júnior, Lucas Bitencourt
2019	10th place	Arthur Nory, Arthur Zanetti, Caio Souza, Francisco Barretto Júnior, Lucas Bitencourt
2022	7th place	Arthur Nory, Caio Souza, Diogo Soares, Lucas Bitencourt, Yuri Guimarães. Alternate: Patrick Sampaio
2023	13th place	Arthur Nory, Bernardo Actos, Diogo Soares, Patrick Sampaio, Yuri Guimarães. Alternate: Arthur Zanetti
2026	19th place	Arthur Nory, Vitaliy Guimaraes, Diogo Soares, Patrick Sampaio, Johnny Oshiro. Alternate: Bernardo Actos

== Most decorated gymnasts ==
This list includes all Brazilian male artistic gymnasts who have won a medal at the Olympic Games, the World Artistic Gymnastics Championships or the FIG World Cup Final from 1975 to 2008.

Rank	Gymnast	Years	TF	AA	FX	PH	SR	VT	PB	HB	Olympic Total	World Total	World Cup Total	Total
1	Diego Hypólito	2004–2016			2016; 2007; 2005; 2006; 2014; 2011; 2004; 2006; 2008			2006			1	5	4	10
2	Arthur Zanetti	2007–2023					2012; 2016; 2013; 2018; 2014; 2011				2	4	0	6
3	Arthur Nory	2009–2023			2016					2019; 2022	1	2	0	3

== Best international results ==
Event	TF	AA	FX	PH	SR	VT	PB	HB
Olympic Games	6	9	2nd place, silver medalist(s)	17	1st place, gold medalist(s)	8	17	5
World Championships	6	5	1st place, gold medalist(s)	11	1st place, gold medalist(s)	5	7	1st place, gold medalist(s)
FIG World Cup Final (1975–2008)	—N/a		1st place, gold medalist(s)			3rd place, bronze medalist(s)		
Pan American Games	1st place, gold medalist(s)	1st place, gold medalist(s)	1st place, gold medalist(s)	1st place, gold medalist(s)	1st place, gold medalist(s)	1st place, gold medalist(s)	2nd place, silver medalist(s)	1st place, gold medalist(s)
Pan American Championships	1st place, gold medalist(s)	1st place, gold medalist(s)	1st place, gold medalist(s)	1st place, gold medalist(s)	1st place, gold medalist(s)	1st place, gold medalist(s)	1st place, gold medalist(s)	1st place, gold medalist(s)
Junior Pan American Games	2nd place, silver medalist(s)	2nd place, silver medalist(s)	7	1st place, gold medalist(s)	5	5	2nd place, silver medalist(s)	1st place, gold medalist(s)
Junior Pan American Championships	1st place, gold medalist(s)	1st place, gold medalist(s)	1st place, gold medalist(s)	3rd place, bronze medalist(s)	1st place, gold medalist(s)	1st place, gold medalist(s)	1st place, gold medalist(s)	1st place, gold medalist(s)
South American Games	1st place, gold medalist(s)	1st place, gold medalist(s)	1st place, gold medalist(s)	1st place, gold medalist(s)	1st place, gold medalist(s)	1st place, gold medalist(s)	1st place, gold medalist(s)	1st place, gold medalist(s)
South American Youth Games	1st place, gold medalist(s)	1st place, gold medalist(s)	1st place, gold medalist(s)	1st place, gold medalist(s)	1st place, gold medalist(s)	1st place, gold medalist(s)	2nd place, silver medalist(s)	1st place, gold medalist(s)
South American Championships	1st place, gold medalist(s)	1st place, gold medalist(s)	1st place, gold medalist(s)	1st place, gold medalist(s)	1st place, gold medalist(s)	1st place, gold medalist(s)	1st place, gold medalist(s)	1st place, gold medalist(s)
FIG All-Around World Cup series	—N/a	2nd place, silver medalist(s)	—N/a	—N/a	—N/a	—N/a	—N/a	—N/a
FIG Apparatus World Cup series	—N/a	—N/a	1st place, gold medalist(s)	2nd place, silver medalist(s)	2nd place, silver medalist(s)	1st place, gold medalist(s)	1st place, gold medalist(s)	2nd place, silver medalist(s)
FIG World Challenge Cup series	—N/a	—N/a	1st place, gold medalist(s)	2nd place, silver medalist(s)	1st place, gold medalist(s)	1st place, gold medalist(s)	1st place, gold medalist(s)	1st place, gold medalist(s)
Youth Olympics	—N/a	3rd place, bronze medalist(s)	14	7	6	4	9	2nd place, silver medalist(s)
Junior World Championships		10			2nd place, silver medalist(s)	5		6
Universiade					1st place, gold medalist(s)	3rd place, bronze medalist(s)		2nd place, silver medalist(s)

== See also ==
- Brazil women's national artistic gymnastics team
- List of Olympic male artistic gymnasts for Brazil
- Brazil at the World Artistic Gymnastics Championships
- Gymnastics at the Pan American Games
- Gymnastics at the South American Games
- Pan American Gymnastics Championships
- South American Gymnastics Championships
