= Tomás González (gymnast) =

Chilean artistic gymnast

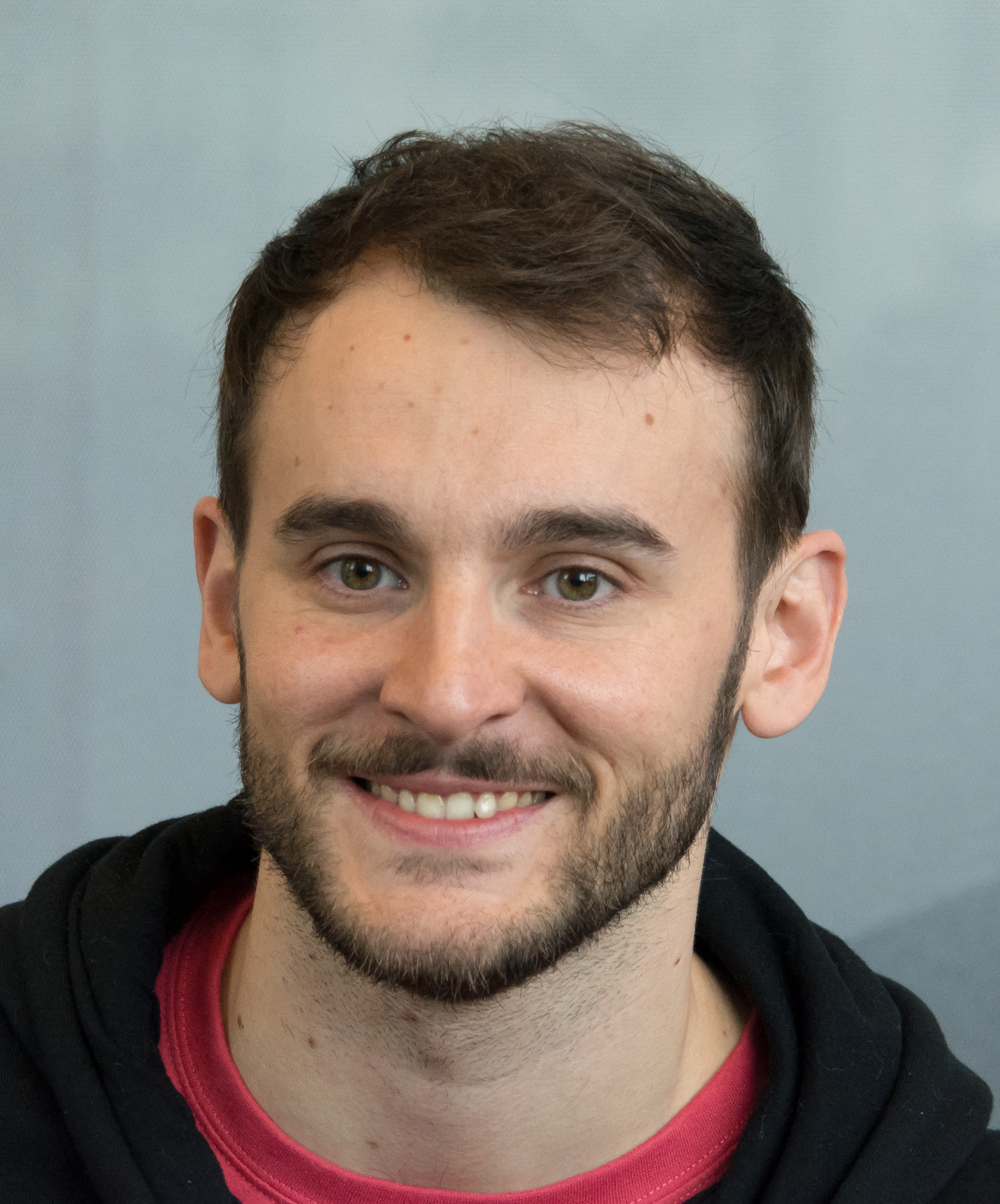
- González in 2019

Personal information
- Full name: Enrique Tomás González Sepúlveda
- Born: November 22, 1985 (age 40) Santiago, Chile
- Height: 171 cm (5 ft 7 in)

Gymnastics career
- Discipline: Men's artistic gymnastics
- Country represented: Chile
- Club: Universidad Católica de Chile
- Head coach: (Cuba) Yoel Gutiérrez (2007–2013)
- Assistant coach: (Chile) Daniela Fingerhuth
- Former coach: (Russia) Yevgeny Belov (1994–2002)
Medal record
Men's artistic gymnastics
Representing Chile
Pan American Games
Gold medal – first place	2019 Lima	Floor exercise
Silver medal – second place	2007 Rio de Janeiro	Vault
Silver medal – second place	2011 Guadalajara	Floor exercise
Silver medal – second place	2011 Guadalajara	Vault
Bronze medal – third place	2007 Rio de Janeiro	Floor exercise
Bronze medal – third place	2011 Guadalajara	All-around
Pan American Championships
Gold medal – first place	2010 Guadalajara	Vault
Gold medal – first place	2014 Mississauga	Floor exercise
Gold medal – first place	2018 Lima	Floor exercise
Silver medal – second place	2010 Guadalajara	Floor exercise
Bronze medal – third place	2017 Lima	Floor exercise
Pan American Sports Festival
Gold medal – first place	2014 Guadalajara	Floor exercise
South American Games
Gold medal – first place	2014 Santiago	Floor exercise
Gold medal – first place	2014 Santiago	Vault
Gold medal – first place	2018 Cochabamba	Floor exercise
Silver medal – second place	2002 Curitiba	Floor exercise
Silver medal – second place	2002 Curitiba	Vault
Silver medal – second place	2006 Buenos Aires	Floor exercise
Silver medal – second place	2010 Medellín	Floor exercise
Bronze medal – third place	2010 Medellín	All-around
Bronze medal – third place	2010 Medellín	Vault
Bronze medal – third place	2010 Medellín	Parallel bars

Enrique Tomás González Sepúlveda (born November 22, 1985 in Santiago, Chile) is a Chilean artistic gymnast, the first of his country to medal at World Cup events, and the first to qualify for a Summer Olympic Games. He specializes in vault and floor exercises.

== Career ==
González has won nine medals (four golds, four silvers, and one bronze) at World Cup events, six medals (one gold, three silvers, and two bronzes) at Pan American Games, seven medals (two golds, two silvers, and three bronzes) at South American Games and one gold medal at the January 2012 London Olympics test event (where he qualified for the Olympics). He has participated in eight World Championships (2003, 2005, 2007, 2009, 2010, 2011, 2015, and 2017), finishing 7th in 2009, 6th in 2011, 8th in 2015, and 5th in 2017 on floor, and 15th in 2010 and 22nd in 2011 in individual all-around.

In April 2011, González was ranked World No. 1 in floor and vault for the first time.

At the 2012 Summer Olympics in London, González finished fourth in the floor and vault finals, with a score of 15.366 (out of 16.500) and 16.183 (out of 16.800), respectively. His execution score of 9.383 in Vault was the highest among the eight finalists.

He competed at the 2020 Summer Olympics.

== Personal life ==
González is going to publish his autobiographic novel in 2023. Within that event, he came out as gay in July 2023.
