= Mosiah Rodrigues =

Brazilian artistic gymnast (born 1981)

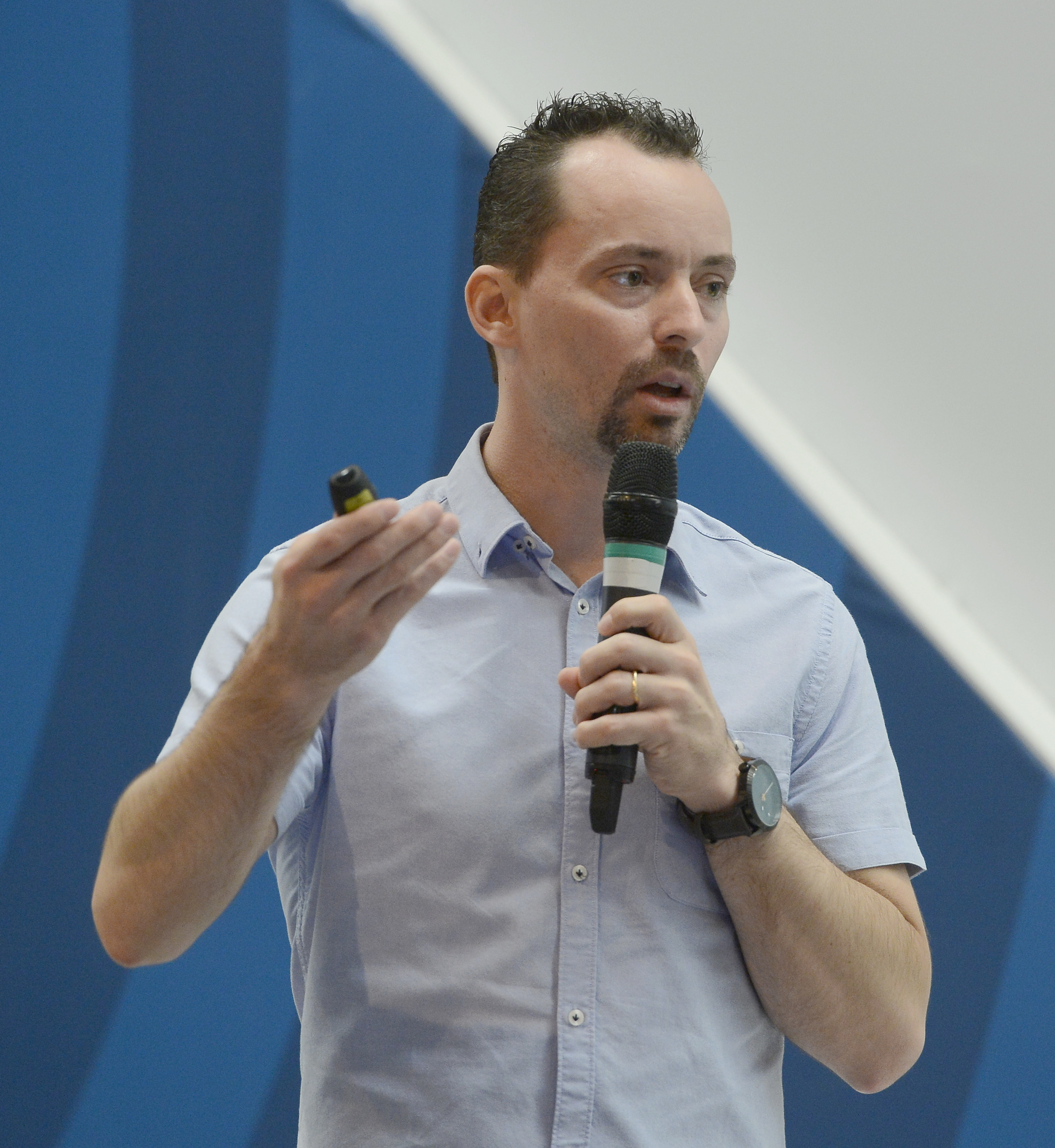

Personal information
- Full name: Mosiah Brentano Rodrigues
- Born: 31 August 1981 (age 45) Porto Alegre, Rio Grande do Sul, Brazil

Gymnastics career
- Discipline: Men's artistic gymnastics
- Country represented: Brazil
Medal record
Men's artistic gymnastics
Representing Brazil
Summer Universiade
Silver medal – second place	2005 İzmir	Horizontal bar
Pan American Games
Gold medal – first place	2007 Rio de Janeiro	Horizontal bar
Silver medal – second place	2003 Santo Domingo	Team
Silver medal – second place	2007 Rio de Janeiro	Team
Bronze medal – third place	2003 Santo Domingo	Pommel horse
Bronze medal – third place	2003 Santo Domingo	Horizontal bar
Pan American Championships
Gold medal – first place	2005 Rio de Janeiro	Horizontal bar
Silver medal – second place	2010 Guadalajara	Team
Bronze medal – third place	2004 Maracaibo	Pommel horse
Bronze medal – third place	2005 Rio de Janeiro	All-around
South American Games
Gold medal – first place	2002 Curitiba	Team
Gold medal – first place	2002 Curitiba	Pommel horse
Gold medal – first place	2006 Buenos Aires	Team
Gold medal – first place	2006 Buenos Aires	Horizontal bar
Gold medal – first place	2010 Medellín	Team
Silver medal – second place	2002 Curitiba	All-around
Silver medal – second place	2006 Buenos Aires	Pommel horse
Silver medal – second place	2010 Medellín	Horizontal bar
Bronze medal – third place	1998 Cuenca	Team
Bronze medal – third place	1998 Cuenca	Horizontal bar
Bronze medal – third place	2010 Medellín	Pommel horse
South American Championships
Gold medal – first place	2009 Sogamoso	Pommel horse
Gold medal – first place	2011 Santiago	Team
Gold medal – first place	2011 Santiago	Pommel horse
Silver medal – second place	2009 Sogamoso	Team
Silver medal – second place	2009 Sogamoso	Floor exercise
Silver medal – second place	2009 Sogamoso	Horizontal bar
Silver medal – second place	2011 Santiago	Horizontal bar
Bronze medal – third place	2009 Sogamoso	All-around

Mosiah Rodrigues (born 31 August 1981) is a Brazilian male artistic gymnast, representing his nation at international competitions. He participated at the 2004 Summer Olympics. He also competed at world championships, including the 2005 World Artistic Gymnastics Championships in Melbourne, Australia, and at the Pan-American Games.

== Gymnastics career ==
Rodrigues won two bronze medals at the 2003 Games, in Santo Domingo for the high bar and pommel horse and a silver medal for the team competition. At the 2007 Pan-American Games, in Rio de Janeiro he won a gold medal on the high bar and a silver medal on the team competition.

== Personal life ==
Rodrigues is a practicing member of the Church of Jesus Christ of Latter-day Saints, his parents being converts to that faith.
