= Valentina Meriño =

Chilean rhythmic gymnast

- Full name: Valentina Franca Meriño Ferretti
- Born: 26 January 1987 (age 39)

Gymnastics career
- Discipline: Rhythmic gymnastics
- Country represented: Chile; (2003-2010)
- Head coaches: Marcela Ramírez, Enrique Hidalgo
- Retired: yes
Medal record
Rhythmic gymnastics
Representing Chile
South American Games
Bronze medal – third place	2006 Buenos Aires	Ribbon
South American Championships
Gold medal – first place	2007 San Cristóbal	Team
Gold medal – first place	2007 San Cristóbal	All-Around
Gold medal – first place	2007 San Cristóbal	Rope
Gold medal – first place	2007 San Cristóbal	Hoop
Gold medal – first place	2007 San Cristóbal	Clubs

Valentina Franca Meriño Ferretti (born 26 January 1987) is a retired Chilean rhythmic gymnast. She's a medalist at South American and Pan American level.

== Biography ==
In 2003 Valentina was the national Chilean champion and participated in the World Championships in Budapest, the first in which Chile took part.

Selected for the 2006 South American Games in Buenos Aires she won bronze in the ribbon final, behind Anahí Sosa and Ana Paula Scheffer.

In September 2007 she competed at the World Championships in Patras, taking 97th place in the All-Around. A month later she won gold in teams (along Paloma Garate, Catalina Ulloa and Catalina Vichez), in the All-Around, with rope, hoop and clubs at the South American Championships.

Meriño studied physical education at the Autonomous University of Chile, and psychology at the Pontifical Catholic University of Chile. She retired in 2010.
