= Camila Comin =

Brazilian artistic gymnast (born 1983)

- Born: 31 March 1983 (age 43) São Paulo, Brazil
- Height: 5 ft 11 in (180 cm)

Gymnastics career
- Discipline: Women's artistic gymnastics
- Country represented: Brazil (2006)
Medal record
Pan American Games
Bronze medal – third place	1999 Winnipeg	Team
Bronze medal – third place	2003 Santo Domingo	Team
Pan American Championships
Gold medal – first place	1997 Medellín	Team
Silver medal – second place	2001 Cancún	Team
Silver medal – second place	2005 Rio de Janeiro	Team
Bronze medal – third place	1997 Medellín	Uneven Bars
Bronze medal – third place	2001 Cancún	Balance Beam
Bronze medal – third place	2005 Rio de Janeiro	Uneven Bars
South American Games
Gold medal – first place	1998 Cuenca	Team
Gold medal – first place	2002 Curitiba	Team

Camila Comin (born 31 March 1983) is a Brazilian acrobat and retired artistic gymnast, representing her nation at international competitions.

She participated at the 2004 Summer Olympics. She also participated at world championships, including the 2006 World Artistic Gymnastics Championships in Aarhus, Denmark. She retired from gymnastics in 2006, moving to Canada to join Cirque du Soleil, being a part of the production Corteo. Comin has since mostly performed with Cirque FLIP Fabrique, a troupe she help found in Canada in 2011 and has presented since 2015.
