= Anahí Sosa =

Argentine rhythmic gymnast

Anahi Sosa
- Born: 12 September 1982 (age 43)

Gymnastics career
- Discipline: Rhythmic gymnastics
- Country represented: Argentina (1993-2007 (?))
Medal record
Representing Argentina
Four Continents Championships
Bronze medal – third place	2001 Curitiba	All-around
Pan American Games
Bronze medal – third place	2003 Santo Domingo	All-around
Bronze medal – third place	2003 Santo Domingo	Hoop
Pan American Championships
Gold medal – first place	2001 Cancún	Clubs
Silver medal – second place	1997 Medellín	Team
Silver medal – second place	2001 Cancún	Hoop
Silver medal – second place	2001 Cancún	Rope
Bronze medal – third place	2001 Cancún	Team
South American Games
Gold medal – first place	1998 Cuenca	Team
Gold medal – first place	1998 Cuenca	All-Around
Gold medal – first place	1998 Cuenca	Rope
Gold medal – first place	1998 Cuenca	Hoop
Gold medal – first place	1998 Cuenca	Clubs
Gold medal – first place	1998 Cuenca	Ribbon
Gold medal – first place	2002 Curitiba	Rope
Gold medal – first place	2002 Curitiba	Hoop
Gold medal – first place	2006 Buenos Aires	Team
Gold medal – first place	2006 Buenos Aires	All-around
Gold medal – first place	2006 Buenos Aires	Ball
Gold medal – first place	2006 Buenos Aires	Ribbon
Silver medal – second place	2002 Curitiba	Team
Silver medal – second place	2002 Curitiba	All-around
Silver medal – second place	2002 Curitiba	Ball
Silver medal – second place	2002 Curitiba	Clubs

Anahi Sosa (born 12 September 1982) is an Argentine individual rhythmic gymnast. She represented her nation at international competitions. At the 2001 Pan American Gymnastics Championships she won the gold medal in the clubs event, and further a silver medal in the hoop and rope events and a bronze medal in the team all-around event. At the 2003 Pan American Games she won the bronze medal in the individual All-Around and hoops events. In 2006 she won three gold medal at the 2006 South American Games in the all-around, ball and ribbon events.

She competed at world championships, including at the 2001 World Rhythmic Gymnastics Championships 2003 World Rhythmic Gymnastics Championships and 2007 World Rhythmic Gymnastics Championships.
