= Melina Sirolli =

Argentine artistic gymnast (born 1984)

- Full name: Melina Debora Sirolli
- Born: April 23, 1984 (age 42)

Gymnastics career
- Discipline: Women's artistic gymnastics
- Country represented: Argentina (2000)
Medal record
Representing Argentina
Women's artistic gymnastics
South American Games
Gold medal – first place	1998 Cuenca	All-around
Gold medal – first place	1998 Cuenca	Floor exercise
Silver medal – second place	1998 Cuenca	Team
Bronze medal – third place	1998 Cuenca	Vault
Bronze medal – third place	1998 Cuenca	Balance beam
Pan American Games
Bronze medal – third place	1999 Winnipeg	Balance beam
Women's tumbling
Pan American Championships
Silver medal – second place	2008 Buenos Aires	Tumbling team

Melina Debora Sirolli (born 23 April 1984) was an Argentine artistic gymnast, representing her nation at international competitions.

At the 1998 South American Games, she won two gold medals, one silver, and two bronze. At the 1999 Pan American Games, she won a bronze medal in the balance beam event.

Sirolli also participated at the 2000 Summer Olympics, the 2003 World Artistic Gymnastics Championships, and the 2003 Pan American Games.

At the 2008 Pan American Trampoline and Tumbling Championships, she won a silver medal in the tumbling team event.
