= 2007 South American Rhythmic Gymnastics Championships =

International rhythmic gymnastics competition

The 2007 South American Rhythmic Gymnastics Championships were held in San Cristóbal, Venezuela, October 4–7, 2007. The competition was organized by the Venezuelan Gymnastics Federation.

== Participating nations ==
- Argentina
- Bolivia
- Chile
- Colombia
- Ecuador
- Venezuela

== Medalists ==
Senior

Event	Gold	Silver	Bronze
Team all-around	Chile; Valentina Meriño; Paloma Garate; Catalina Ulloa; Catalina Vichez	Venezuela; Edgarvy Garcés; Rosimar Marvez; Yoliana González	Argentina; Sabrina Torella; Samantha Nigro; Lissete Martínez
Individual all-around	Valentina Meriño (CHI)	Unknown	Unknown
Rope	Valentina Meriño (CHI)	Unknown	Unknown
Hoop	Valentina Meriño (CHI)	Unknown	Unknown
Clubs	Valentina Meriño (CHI)	Unknown	Unknown
Ribbon	Paloma Garate (CHI)	Unknown	Unknown
