= 2006 FIG Artistic Gymnastics World Cup final =

International gymnastics competition

The 2006 Artistic Gymnastics World Cup Final was held in São Paulo, Brazil in 2006. This was the fifth edition of the World Cup Final. From 2005 to 2006, a series of qualifying events were held, culminating in a final event, the World Cup Final. The different stages, sometimes referred to as World Cup Qualifiers, mostly served the purpose of awarding points to individual gymnasts and groups according to their placements. These points would be added up over the two-year period to qualify a limited number of athletes to the biennial World Cup Final event.

== Medal winners ==
Event	Gold	Silver	Bronze	Ref.
Men's floor exercise	(Brazil) Diego Hypólito	(Canada) Kyle Shewfelt	(Canada) Brandon O'Neill	
Men's pommel horse	(China) Xiao Qin	(Hungary) Krisztián Berki	(China) Teng Haibin	
Men's still rings	(Venezuela) Regulo Carmona	(Ukraine) Oleksandr Vorobyov	(Italy) Matteo Angioletti	
Men's vault	(Romania) Marian Drăgulescu	(Russia) Anton Golotsutskov	(Brazil) Diego Hypólito	
Men's parallel bars	(China) Li Xiaopeng	(China) Huang Xu	(Ukraine) Valeriy Honcharov	
Men's horizontal bar	(Greece) Vlasios Maras	(Australia) Philippe Rizzo	(Slovenia) Aljaž Pegan	
Women's vault	(China) Cheng Fei	(Brazil) Laís Souza	(Russia) Elena Zamolodchikova	
Women's uneven bars	(United Kingdom) Beth Tweddle	(China) Li Ya	(Ukraine) Dariya Zgoba	
Women's balance beam	(China) Li Ya	(Brazil) Daniele Hypólito	(Spain) Lenika de Simone	
Women's floor exercise	(Brazil) Daiane dos Santos	(United Kingdom) Beth Tweddle	(Brazil) Laís Souza	
