= Tayanne Mantovaneli =

Brazilian rhythmic gymnast

- Born: 14 February 1987 (age 39) São Paulo, SP

Gymnastics career
- Discipline: Rhythmic gymnastics
- Country represented: Brazil; (2002-2008)
Medal record
Pan American Games
Gold medal – first place	2007 Rio de Janeiro	Group all-around
Gold medal – first place	2007 Rio de Janeiro	5 ropes
Gold medal – first place	2007 Rio de Janeiro	3 hoops + 4 clubs
Bronze medal – third place	2003 Santo Domingo	Clubs
South American Games
Gold medal – first place	2002 Curitiba	Team
Gold medal – first place	2006 Buenos Aires	Group all-around
Gold medal – first place	2006 Buenos Aires	5 ribbons
Gold medal – first place	2006 Buenos Aires	3 hoops + 4 clubs
Bronze medal – third place	2002 Curitiba	All-around
Bronze medal – third place	2002 Curitiba	Hoop
Bronze medal – third place	2002 Curitiba	Ball

Tayanne Mantovaneli (born 14 February 1987) is a Brazilian group rhythmic gymnast. She represents her nation at international competitions.

She participated at the 2004 Summer Olympics in Sydney and 2008 Summer Olympics in Beijing. She also competed at world championships, including at the 2007 World Rhythmic Gymnastics Championships.

== See also ==
- List of Olympic rhythmic gymnasts for Brazil
