= Gymnastics at the 2006 South American Games =

Sport tournament

Gymnastics events were competed at the 2006 South American Games in Buenos Aires.

== Medal summary ==
=== Medal table ===
Rank	Nation	Gold	Silver	Bronze	Total
1	Brazil (BRA)	12	13	6	31
2	Argentina (ARG)	7	4	5	16
3	Venezuela (VEN)	2	4	4	10
4	Colombia (COL)	2	1	5	8
5	Chile (CHI)	0	1	3	4
Totals (5 entries)		23	23	23	69

== Artistic gymnastics ==
=== Men ===
Event	Gold	Silver	Bronze
Team	Victor Rosa; Caio Costa; Mosiah Rodrigues; Adan Santos; Vitor Camargo; Luiz Anjos; Brazil	José Luis Fuentes; Carlos Carbonell; Fernando Fuentes; Ivan Tovar; José Parra; Regulo Carmona; Venezuela	Federico Molinari; Juan Lompizano; Martin Barrionuevo; Lucas Chiarlo; Osvaldo Martínez; Sergio Erbojo; Argentina
All-Around	Jorge Giraldo; Colombia	José Luis Fuentes; Venezuela	Victor Rosa; Brazil
Floor Exercise	Victor Rosa; Brazil	Tomás González; Chile	Martin Barrionuevo; Argentina
Pommel Horse	José Luis Fuentes; Venezuela	Mosiah Rodrigues; Brazil	Jorge Giraldo; Colombia
Rings	Regulo Carmona; Venezuela	Jorge Giraldo; Colombia	José Luis Fuentes; Venezuela
Vault	Victor Rosa; Brazil	Vitor Camargo; Brazil	Felipe Piña; Chile
Parallel Bars	Jorge Giraldo; Colombia	José Luis Fuentes; Venezuela	Luiz Anjos; Brazil
Horizontal Bar	Mosiah Rodrigues; Brazil	Luiz Anjos; Brazil	José Luis Fuentes; Venezuela

=== Women ===
Event	Gold	Silver	Bronze
Team	Jade Barbosa; Ethiene Franco; Khiuani Dias; Milena Miranda; Ana Silva; Thamires Araujo; Brazil	Virginia Deluzio; Aylen Gonzalez; Sol Poliandri; Florencia Salomon; Nadir Domeneghini; Ayelen Tarabini; Argentina	Jessica Gil; Bibiana Velez; Nathalia Sánchez; Catalina Escobar; Colombia
All-Around	Jade Barbosa; Brazil	Ethiene Franco; Brazil	Khiuani Dias; Brazil
Vault	Jade Barbosa; Brazil	Milena Miranda; Brazil	Jessica Gil Ortiz; Colombia
Uneven Bars	Virginia Deluzio; Argentina	Ana Silva; Brazil	Bibiana Vélez; Colombia
Balance Beam	Jade Barbosa; Brazil	Ethiene Franco; Brazil	Nathalia Sánchez; Colombia
Floor	Jade Barbosa; Brazil	Ethiene Franco; Brazil	Virginia Deluzio; Argentina

== Rhythmic gymnastics ==
=== Medalists ===
Event	Gold	Silver	Bronze
Individual all-around	Anahí Sosa; Argentina	Antonella Yacobelli; Argentina	Ana Paula Ribeiro; Brazil
Team all-around	Argentina; Anahí Sosa; Antonella Yacobelli; Analía Serenelli; Vanesa Robles	Brazil; Ana Paula Ribeiro; Ana Paula Scheffer; Yuca Solano; Luisa Matsuo	Venezuela; Andreína Acevedo; Catherine Cortez; Katherin Arias
Rope	Antonella Yacobelli; Argentina	Ana Paula Scheffer; Brazil	Ana Paula Ribeiro; Brazil
Ball	Anahí Sosa; Argentina	Ana Paula Ribeiro; Brazil	Antonella Yacobelli; Argentina
Clubs	Antonella Yacobelli; Argentina	Ana Paula Scheffer; Brazil	Ana Paula Ribeiro; Brazil
Ribbon	Anahí Sosa; Argentina	Ana Paula Scheffer; Brazil	Valentina Meriño; Chile
Group all-around	Brazil; Daniela Leite; Luciane Hammes; Nicole Muller; Nickolle Abreu; Tayanne Mantovaneli; Marcela Menezes	Argentina; Sofía Speratti; Darya Shara; Gabriela Espinosa; Maria Anabel Giachetti; Milagros Carrasco; Guadalupe Aizaga	Chile; Paloma Garate; Maria Molina; Natalia Carriquiry; Antonia Bezanilla; Macarena Fernandez
Group 5 ribbons	Brazil; Daniela Leite; Luciane Hammes; Nicole Muller; Nickolle Abreu; Tayanne Mantovaneli; Marcela Menezes	Argentina; Sofía Speratti; Darya Shara; Gabriela Espinosa; Maria Anabel Giachetti; Milagros Carrasco; Guadalupe Aizaga	Venezuela; Andrea Myerston; Mariangel Balza Reveron; Yessica Arias; Maria Gabriela Trompetero; Katherin Arias
Group 3 hoops + 4 clubs	Brazil; Daniela Leite; Luciane Hammes; Nicole Muller; Nickolle Abreu; Tayanne Mantovaneli; Marcela Menezes	Venezuela; Andrea Myerston; Mariangel Balza Reveron; Yessica Arias; Maria Gabriela Trompetero; Katherin Arias	Argentina; Sofía Speratti; Darya Shara; Gabriela Espinosa; Maria Anabel Giachetti; Milagros Carrasco; Guadalupe Aizaga
