= Marilia Gomes =

Brazilian artistic gymnast (born 1982)

- Born: August 3, 1982 (age 44) São Paulo

Gymnastics career
- Discipline: Women's artistic gymnastics
- Country represented: Brazil (1997-1999)
- Club: Yashi; CR Vasco da Gama
Medal record
Representing Brazil
Women's Artistic gymnastics
Pan American Games
Bronze medal – third place	1999 Winnipeg	Team
Pan American Championships
Gold medal – first place	1997 Medellín	Team
Bronze medal – third place	1997 Medellín	Floor Exercise
South American Games
Gold medal – first place	1998 Cuenca	Team
Gold medal – first place	1998 Cuenca	Balance Beam
Silver medal – second place	1998 Cuenca	All-Around
Bronze medal – third place	1998 Cuenca	Uneven Bars

Marilia Gomes de Souza, née Mattos (born 3 August 1982) is a retired Brazilian female artistic gymnast who represented her nation in international competitions. She participated at the 1999 World Artistic Gymnastics Championships in Tianjin, China.
