= Daniele Hypólito =

Brazilian gymnast (born 1984)

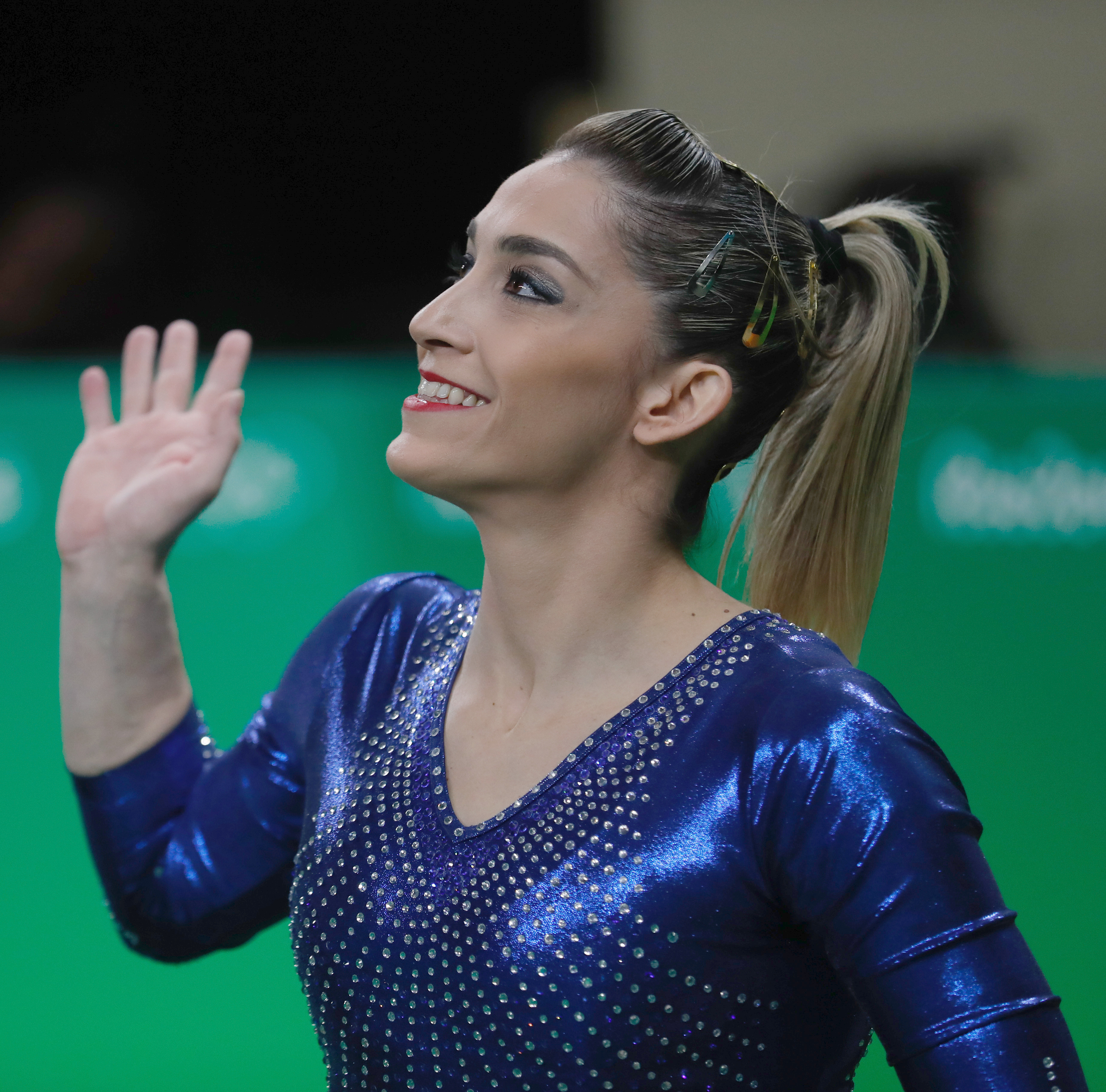
- Hypólito at the 2016 Summer Olympics

Personal information
- Full name: Daniele Matias Hypólito
- Nickname: Dani
- Born: 8 September 1984 (age 41) Santo André, São Paulo, Brazil
- Height: 147 cm (4 ft 10 in)

Gymnastics career
- Discipline: Women's artistic gymnastics
- Country represented: Brazil
- Club: CR Flamengo
- Head coach: Alexandre Carvalho
- Music: Hello Zepp (2009–2012)
- World ranking: Vault: 5 Bars: 2 Beam: 12 (2016)
Medal record
Women's artistic gymnastics
Representing Brazil
Event	1st	2nd	3rd
World Championships	0	1	0
FIG World Cup	2	0	0
FIG World Challenge Cup	5	1	1
Total	7	2	1
World Championships
Silver medal – second place	2001 Ghent	Floor exercise
Pan American Games
Silver medal – second place	2003 Santo Domingo	Balance beam
Silver medal – second place	2003 Santo Domingo	Uneven bars
Silver medal – second place	2007 Rio de Janeiro	Team
Bronze medal – third place	1999 Winnipeg	Team
Bronze medal – third place	2003 Santo Domingo	All-around
Bronze medal – third place	2003 Santo Domingo	Team
Bronze medal – third place	2007 Rio de Janeiro	Balance beam
Bronze medal – third place	2011 Guadalajara	Balance beam
Bronze medal – third place	2011 Guadalajara	Floor exercise
Bronze medal – third place	2015 Toronto	Team
Pan American Championships
Gold medal – first place	1997 Medellín	Team
Gold medal – first place	1997 Medellín	Uneven bars
Gold medal – first place	1997 Medellín	Floor exercise
Gold medal – first place	2012 Medellín	Balance beam
Gold medal – first place	2012 Medellín	Floor exercise
Gold medal – first place	2013 San Juan	Floor exercise
Silver medal – second place	2001 Cancún	Team
Silver medal – second place	2005 Rio de Janeiro	Team
Silver medal – second place	2005 Rio de Janeiro	All-around
Silver medal – second place	2005 Rio de Janeiro	Uneven bars
Silver medal – second place	2005 Rio de Janeiro	Floor exercise
Silver medal – second place	2010 Guadalajara	Vault
Silver medal – second place	2014 Mississauga	Team
Bronze medal – third place	2001 Cancún	Floor exercise
Bronze medal – third place	2010 Guadalajara	Team
South American Games
Gold medal – first place	2002 Curitiba	Team
Gold medal – first place	2002 Curitiba	All-around
Gold medal – first place	2002 Curitiba	Vault
Gold medal – first place	2002 Curitiba	Balance beam
Gold medal – first place	2002 Curitiba	Floor exercise
Gold medal – first place	2014 Santiago	Team
Gold medal – first place	2014 Santiago	Floor exercise
Silver medal – second place	2002 Curitiba	Uneven bars
South American Championships
Gold medal – first place	2015 Cali	Team
Gold medal – first place	2015 Cali	All-around
Gold medal – first place	2015 Cali	Vault
Gold medal – first place	2015 Cali	Balance beam
Silver medal – second place	2015 Cali	Floor exercise

Daniele Matias Hypólito (born 8 September 1984) is a Brazilian gymnast who competed at the 2000, 2004, 2008, 2012 and the 2016 Olympic Games. Hypólito is the first gymnast from Brazil to win a medal at the World Championships, a silver in floor exercise in 2001. She is also the nine-time senior all-around Brazilian national champion in artistic gymnastics, 2002 South American Games all-around champion and 2003 Pan American Games all-around bronze medalist. To date, Hypólito has won the Brazilian National Championships more than ten times; represented Brazil at the World Championships thirteen times, competing in every championship from 1999 to 2015, except in 2009; taken part in every edition of the Olympic Games from 2000 to 2016; and competed at five Pan American Games between 1999 and 2015.

She is the sister of Diego Hypólito, the first Brazilian male gymnast to win a medal at the World Championships.

== Personal life ==
Hypólito was born in Santo André, São Paulo, to Wagner and Geni. Her younger brother, Diego, is also a world-class gymnast. She is a Roman Catholic.

Alongside her brother, she entered Big Brother Brasil as a contestant in its 25th season.

== Gymnastics career ==
Training in Rio de Janeiro, Hypólito was competing internationally by the time she was 10 years old. As a junior, she won the all-around in the Junior Pan American Games in 1998 and the Canberra Cup in 1999. Hypólito placed a modest 27th in the all-around at the 1999 World Gymnastics Championships, but helped Brazil qualify athletes to the 2000 Olympics in Sydney. She was chosen to represent Brazil at the Olympics and qualified for the all-around final, finishing in 20th place.

In 2001, Hypólito made dramatic improvements. At that year's World Championships, she placed fourth in the all-around, scoring 9.056 on vault, 8.912 on bars, 9.375 on beam and 9.562 on floor. Until Jade Barbosa's bronze medal win at the 2007 World Championships, this placement was the highest AA finish ever achieved by a Brazilian gymnast in Worlds or Olympic competition. Hypólito followed up her strong AA showing by winning Brazil's first ever gymnastics medal, a silver, in the floor exercise event final (9.487). She continued to do well in 2002, winning the all-around and every event final gold except uneven bars at the South American Games and placing 5th on floor at the World Championships (9.237). At the 2003 World Championships Hypólito placed last in the all-around after injuring herself on her first event, however, she helped Brazil qualify a full team for the 2004 Olympics. At the Olympics, Hypólito competed well, helping the Brazilian team to a ninth-place finish and placing 12th in the all-around.

Hypólito placed 9th in the all-around at the 2005 World Championships. In 2006, she won her ninth national championships. She also won the silver medal on balance beam at the 2006 World Cup Finals, one of the major events on the FIG calendar, that took place in São Paulo, Brazil.

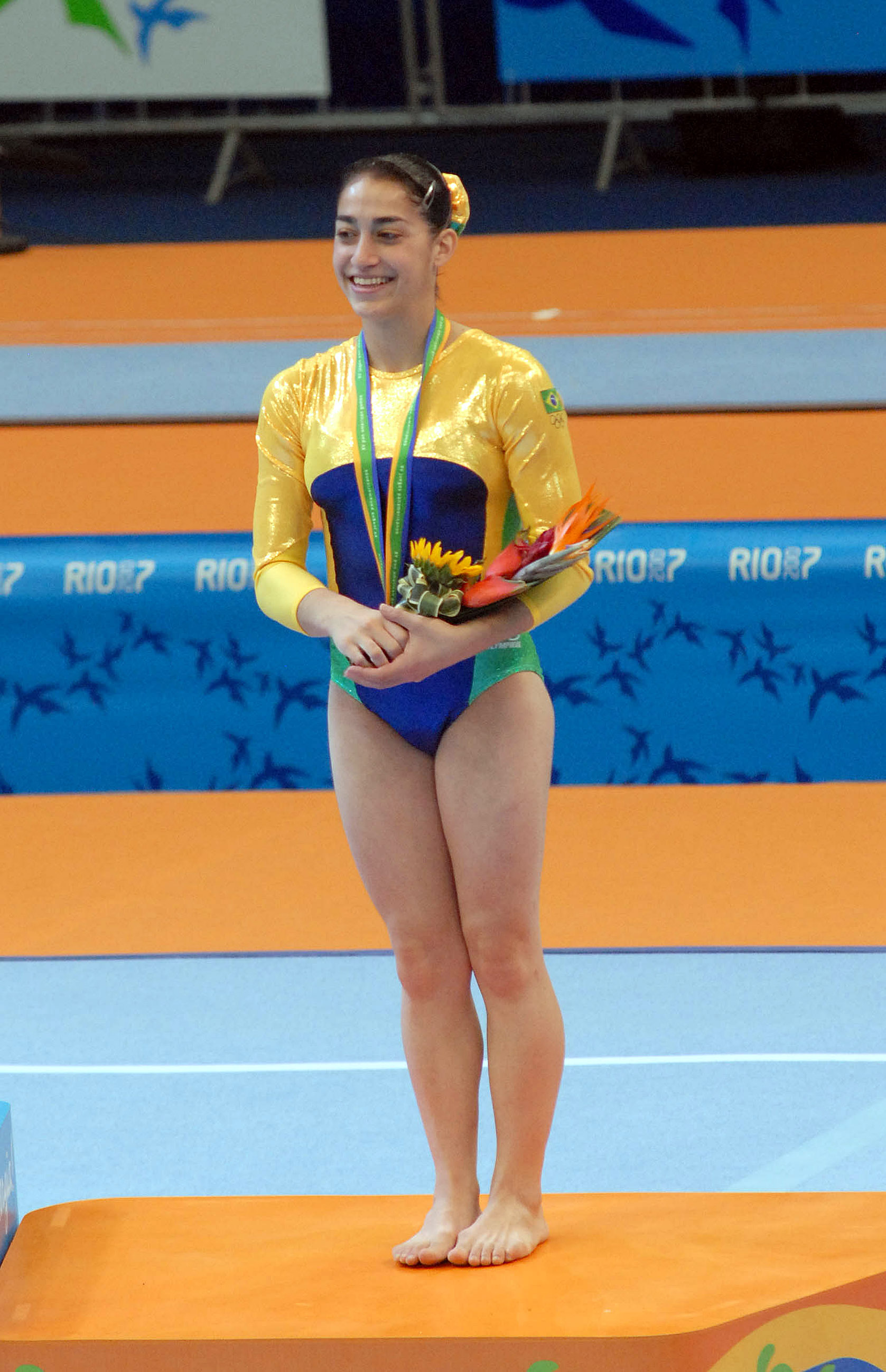
Hypólito at the 2007 Pan American Games

In 2007, Hypólito placed second in the all-around at the Brazilian National Championships and won the floor exercise title. She was a member of the silver medal-winning Brazilian team at the 2007 Pan American Games, where she placed 5th in the all-around and won a bronze medal on beam. She scored 15.375, while the silver-medalist Nastia Liukin got 15.9 and the gold-medalist, Shawn, scored 16.15. She also participated in the 2007 World Championships, where she helped the Brazilian team to its highest placing ever, fifth in the team finals. She also competed at the 2007 Arthur Gander Memorial Cup in Switzerland, where she placed 4th all-around and won a bronze medal on floor.

In 2008, Hypólito left the National Training Center in Curitiba to return to her home club, Flamengo, in Rio de Janeiro. At the 2008 Brazilian National Championships, she placed first on the balance beam, second on floor, and third in the all-around and vault.

At the Olympics, Hypólito competed on three events — bars, beam and floor exercise — in the preliminary round of competition. In the team finals, she competed on balance beam and uneven bars, contributing scores of 14.925 and 14.625 to the Brazilian team's 8th-place finish.

In 2010, back to important competitions, she competed in 2010 World Artistic Gymnastics Championships. She placed 18th in All Around Final and 10th in team final. In 2011, Daniele helped Brazilian team to place 14th in 2011 World Artistic Gymnastics Championships. She also improved her individual result, placing 13th in All Around Final. In 2011 Pan American Games, Daniele won two bronze medals: on floor (13.75) and on beam (13.75). She placed 5th in the team competition behind US, Canada, Mexico and Colombia; and 7th in all-around.

In 2012, her first competition was the 2012 Gymnastics Olympic Test Event. She helped the Brazilian team to qualify in fourth place for the 2012 Olympic Games. In the event finals, she scored 14.066 on vault and placed fourth. Her teammate Jade Barbosa won the gold. On floor, she received 13.733 and was 8th.

Hypolito won the Brazilian National Championships again in 2014; her club, CEGIN, took second in the team event. At the 2014 South American Games, she was a member of the gold medal-winning Brazilian team. Individually, she won gold on floor exercise and placed fifth in the all-around. Hypolito competed at the 2015 Pan Am Games in Toronto, where she placed third with the Brazilian team. Hypolito then went on to compete at the 2015 World Championships, where she helped Brazil place 9th in qualifications, just missing out on a place in the team final and a place at the 2016 Olympic Games.

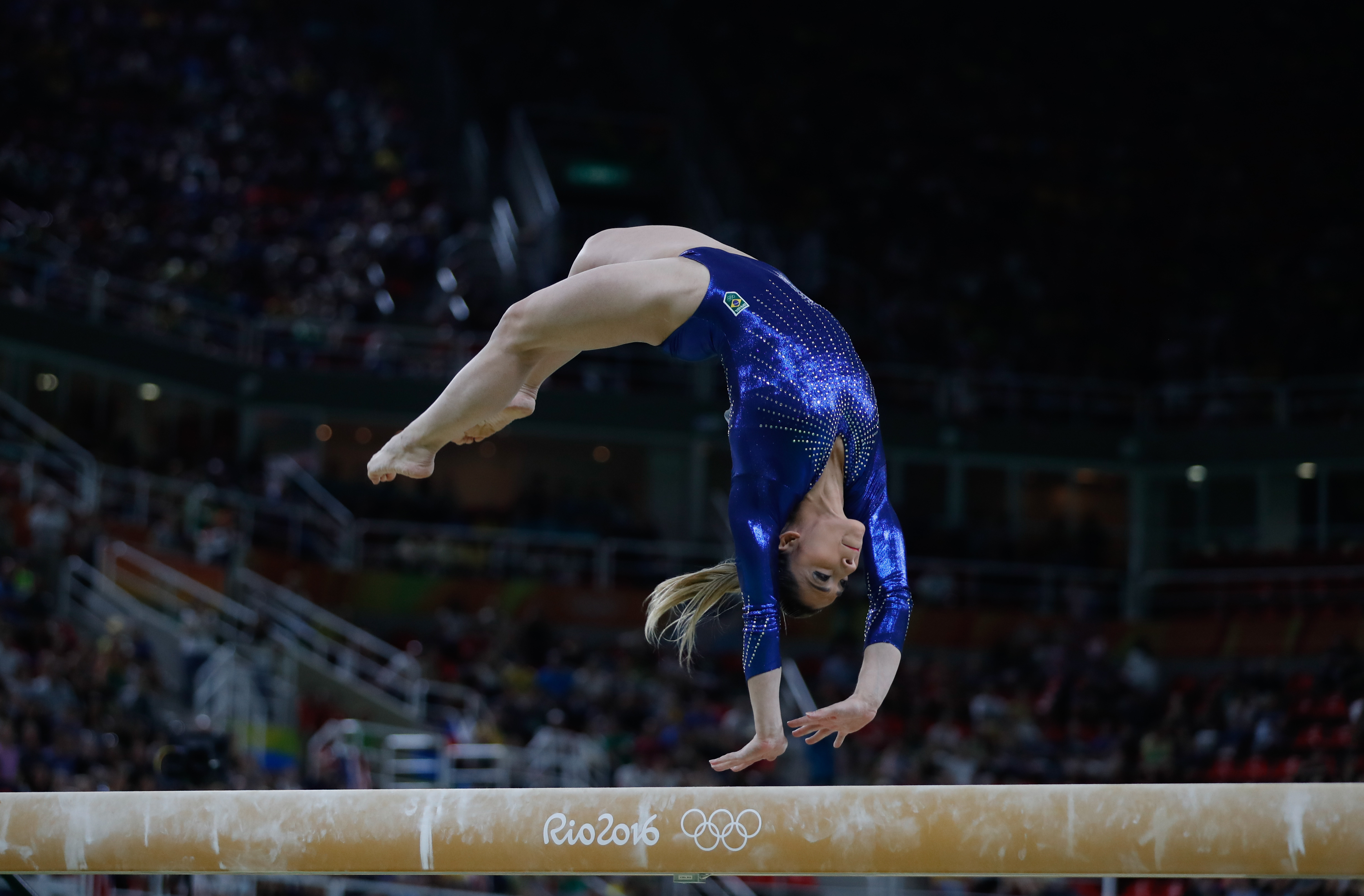
Hypólito at the 2016 Summer Olympics

Hypolito began her 2016 season at the Baku World Challenge Cup in February where she qualified to the uneven bars final and won the silver medal on that event behind Germany's Lina Philipp. In March 2016, Hypolito traveled to Jesolo, Italy to compete at the 2016 City of Jesolo Trophy. Hypolito helped the Brazilian team place 2nd and individually placed 20th All Around. In April, Hypolito competed at the Olympic Test Event in Rio, where she performed on three events and helped the Brazilian team qualify a full team berth for the Olympics.

Hypolito competed with the Brazilian team at the 2016 Games, where she was the team's lead-off gymnast on beam and floor in the qualifying round. Her 14.266 score on beam was the second highest on the Brazilian team. The team qualified for finals, where Hypolito was again lead-off on beam and posted a 14.133.

Awards
Preceded by Leila Barros	Brazilian Sportswomen of the Year; 2001, 2002	Succeeded by Daiane dos Santos
