= Eliana González =

Peruvian table tennis player

Eliana González del Riego
Personal information
- Nationality: Peruvian
- Born: 1 June 1969 (age 55)

Sport
- Sport: Table tennis

Eliana González del Riego (born 1 June 1969) is a Peruvian table tennis player. She competed at the 1992 Summer Olympics and the 1996 Summer Olympics.

She won gold in the 2023 Pan American Masters Table Tennis Championships. She also competed in the Lima Olympic Qualifiers for the 2024 Summer Olympics, and was one of four players representing Peru in the 2024 ITTF Americas Qualification Event. She received a wildcard for the WTT contender Lima 2024.
