= Gymnastics at the 1998 South American Games =

Gymnastics events were competed at the 1998 South American Games in Cuenca, Ecuador.

== Medal summary ==
=== Medal table ===
Rank	Nation	Gold	Silver	Bronze	Total
1	Argentina (ARG)	10	3	7	20
2	Venezuela (VEN)	4	9	5	18
3	Brazil (BRA)	3	6	7	16
4	Colombia (COL)	3	2	2	7
5	Chile (CHI)	0	1	2	3
6	Ecuador (ECU)	0	0	1	1
Totals (6 entries)		20	21	24	65

=== Artistic gymnastics ===
==== Men ====
Event	Gold	Silver	Bronze
Team all-around	Venezuela; Pablo Capote; Carycel Briceño; David Pacheco; Victor Solorzano	Argentina; Eric Pedercini; Marcelo Palacio; Fernando Menghi; Sergio Alvariño; Sergio Erbojo; Martin Barrionuevo	Brazil; Gustavo Barreto; Leandro Heredia; Mosiah Rodrigues
Individual all-around	Jorge Giraldo; Colombia	Pablo Capote; Venezuela	Carycel Briceño; Venezuela
Floor exercise	Fernando Menghi; Argentina	Jorge Giraldo; Colombia Pablo Capote; Venezuela	—
Pommel horse	Alexander Rangel; Colombia	Carycel Briceño; Venezuela	Jorge Giraldo; Colombia
Rings	Sergio Alvariño; Argentina	David Pacheco; Venezuela	Eric Pedercini; Argentina Leonardo Gonzalez; Colombia
Vault	Victor Solorzano; Venezuela	Pablo Capote; Venezuela	Fernando Menghi; Argentina Eric Saavedra; Chile Leandro Heredia; Brazil
Parallel bars	Jorge Giraldo; Colombia	Pablo Capote; Venezuela	Carycel Briceño; Venezuela
Horizontal bar	Carycel Briceño; Venezuela	Jorge Giraldo; Colombia	Gustavo Barreto; Brazil Kleber Cambizaca; Ecuador Mosiah Rodrigues; Brazil

==== Women ====
Event	Gold	Silver	Bronze
Team all-around	Brazil; Marilia Gomes; Daiane dos Santos; Camila Comin; Joselane Santos; Mariana Domitsu; Mariana Sá	Argentina; Melina Sirolli; Barbara Rivarola; Jesica Neri; Guadalupe Irigoyen; Erika Araya; Jesica Pedercini	Chile; Maria Jose Roselot; Patricia Ibacache; Barbara Achondo; Carolina Alarcon; Paola Franchi
Individual all-around	Melina Sirolli; Argentina	Marilia Gomes; Brazil	Barbara Rivarola; Argentina
Vault	Daiane dos Santos; Brazil	Maria Jose Roselot; Chile	Melina Sirolli; Argentina
Uneven bars	Melissa Cesar; Venezuela	Barbara Rivarola; Argentina	Marilia Gomes; Brazil
Balance beam	Marilia Gomes; Brazil	Melissa Cesar; Venezuela	Melina Sirolli; Argentina
Floor exercise	Melina Sirolli; Argentina	Mariana Peña; Venezuela	Daiane dos Santos; Brazil

=== Rhythmic gymnastics ===
Event	Gold	Silver	Bronze
Individual all-around	Anahí Sosa; Argentina	Kizzy Antualpa; Brazil	Aldana di Constanzo; Argentina
Team all-around	Argentina; Anahí Sosa; Aldana di Constanzo; Roxana Marinoff; Maria Fernanda Raviña	Brazil; Kizzy Antualpa	Venezuela
Rope	Anahí Sosa; Argentina	Dubraska Pereira; Venezuela	Kizzy Antualpa; Brazil
Hoop	Anahí Sosa; Argentina	Kizzy Antualpa; Brazil	Dubraska Pereira; Venezuela
Clubs	Anahí Sosa; Argentina	Kizzy Antualpa; Brazil	Dubraska Pereira; Venezuela
Ribbon	Anahí Sosa; Argentina	Kizzy Antualpa; Brazil	Aldana di Constanzo; Argentina
