= Gymnastics at the 2002 South American Games =

Gymnastics events were competed at the 2002 South American Games in Curitiba, Brazil, at the Ginásio de Esportes Professor Almir Nelson de Almeida, also known as Ginásio do Tarumã.

== Medal summary ==
=== Medal table ===
Rank	Nation	Gold	Silver	Bronze	Total
1	Brazil (BRA)	12	6	5	23
2	Argentina (ARG)	5	12	7	24
3	Venezuela (VEN)	3	0	7	10
4	Chile (CHI)	0	2	1	3
Totals (4 entries)		20	20	20	60

=== Artistic gymnastics ===
==== Men ====
Event	Gold	Silver	Bronze
Team all-around	Brazil; Vitor Camargo; Danilo Nogueira; Rogério Pereira; Mosiah Rodrigues; Victor Rosa; Paulo Silva	Argentina; Martin Barrionuevo; Sergio Erbojo; Federico Molinari; Diego Novello; Martin Passalenti; Eric Pedercini	Venezuela; Celis Briceño; José Luis Fuentes; Johnny Parra
Individual all-around	José Luis Fuentes; Venezuela	Mosiah Rodrigues; Brazil	Eric Pedercini; Argentina
Floor exercise	Eric Pedercini; Argentina	Tomás González; Chile	Victor Rosa; Brazil
Pommel horse	Mosiah Rodrigues; Brazil	Eric Pedercini; Argentina	Johnny Parra; Venezuela
Rings	Martin Passalenti; Argentina	Danilo Nogueira; Brazil	Federico Molinari; Argentina
Vault	Eric Pedercini; Argentina	Tomás González; Chile	Johnny Parra; Venezuela
Parallel bars	José Luis Fuentes; Venezuela	Eric Pedercini; Argentina	Celis Briceño; Venezuela
Horizontal bar	José Luis Fuentes; Venezuela	Eric Pedercini; Argentina	Victor Rosa; Brazil

==== Women ====
Event	Gold	Silver	Bronze
Team all-around	Brazil; Camila Comin; Daniele Hypólito; Caroline Molinari; Ana Paula Rodrigues; Stefani Salani; Laís Souza	Argentina; Celeste Carnevale; Daniela Conde; Merlina Galera; Gabriela Parigi; Camila Patterson; Cecilia Stancato	Venezuela
Individual all-around	Daniele Hypólito; Brazil	Caroline Molinari; Brazil	Celeste Carnevale; Argentina
Vault	Daniele Hypólito; Brazil	Celeste Carnevale; Argentina	Daniela Conde; Argentina
Uneven bars	Ana Paula Rodrigues; Brazil	Daniele Hypólito; Brazil	Celeste Carnevale; Argentina
Balance beam	Daniele Hypólito; Brazil	Celeste Carnevale; Argentina	Cecilia Stancato; Argentina
Floor exercise	Daniele Hypólito; Brazil	Daniela Conde; Argentina	Martina Castro; Chile

=== Rhythmic gymnastics ===
Event	Gold	Silver	Bronze
Individual all-around	Larissa Barata; Brazil	Anahí Sosa; Argentina	Tayanne Mantovaneli; Brazil
Team all-around	Brazil; Larissa Barata; Fernanda Cavalieri; Tayanne Mantovaneli; Juliana Rodrigues	Argentina; Anahí Sosa; Florencia Soto; Antonella Yacobelli	Venezuela; Catherine Cortez; Mariafernanda Lara Sanchez; Esther Colmenares; Xiolisbeth Carolina Griman
Rope	Anahí Sosa; Argentina	Larissa Barata; Brazil	Catherine Cortez; Venezuela
Hoop	Anahí Sosa; Argentina	Larissa Barata; Brazil	Tayanne Mantovaneli; Brazil
Ball	Larissa Barata; Brazil	Anahí Sosa; Argentina	Tayanne Mantovaneli; Brazil
Clubs	Larissa Barata; Brazil	Anahí Sosa; Argentina	Antonella Yacobelli; Argentina
