= Victor Rosa =

Brazilian artistic gymnast (born 1986)

- Born: 11 August 1986 (age 40) Rio de Janeiro, Brazil

Gymnastics career
- Discipline: Men's artistic gymnastics
- Country represented: Brazil; (2002–2013)
Medal record
Pan American Games
Silver medal – second place	2003 Santo Domingo	Team
Silver medal – second place	2007 Rio de Janeiro	Team
Pan American Championships
Gold medal – first place	2004 Maracaibo	Floor exercise
Silver medal – second place	2004 Maracaibo	Vault
South American Games
Gold medal – first place	2002 Curitiba	Team
Gold medal – first place	2006 Buenos Aires	Team
Gold medal – first place	2006 Buenos Aires	Floor exercise
Gold medal – first place	2006 Buenos Aires	Vault
Gold medal – first place	2010 Medellín	Team
Bronze medal – third place	2002 Curitiba	Floor exercise
Bronze medal – third place	2002 Curitiba	Horizontal bar
Bronze medal – third place	2006 Buenos Aires	All-around
Bronze medal – third place	2010 Medellín	Floor exercise
South American Championships
Silver medal – second place	2013 Santiago	Team
Bronze medal – third place	2013 Santiago	Floor exercise

Victor Rosa (born 11 August 1986) is a Brazilian male artistic gymnast, representing his nation at international competitions. He participated at world championships, including the 2007 World Artistic Gymnastics Championships in Stuttgart, Germany.
