= Heine Araújo =

Brazilian artistic gymnast (born 1984)

- Born: May 31, 1984 (age 42) Cuiabá

Gymnastics career
- Discipline: Women's artistic gymnastics
- Country represented: Brazil (1999-2003)
- Eponymous skills: Araújo (Balance Beam)
Medal record
Pan American Games
Bronze medal – third place	1999 Winnipeg	Team
Pan American Championships
Silver medal – second place	2001 Cancún	Team

Heine Araújo (born 31 May 1984) is a retired Brazilian female artistic gymnast, who represented her nation at international competitions. She participated at the 2001 World Artistic Gymnastics Championships in Ghent, Belgium.

== Eponymous skill ==
Araújo has a balance beam dismount named after her in the Code of Points.

Apparatus	Name	Description	Difficulty (Note: Valid for the 2025–2028 Code of Points)
Balance beam	Araujo	Salto forward stretched with 2/1 turn (720°)	D (0.4)
