= Luiz Anjos =

Brazilian artistic gymnast (born 1987)

Luiz Augusto dos Anjos
- Born: 7 July 1987 (age 39) Piracicaba, São Paulo, Brazil

Gymnastics career
- Discipline: Men's artistic gymnastics
- Country represented: Brazil (2007)
Medal record
Pan American Games
Silver medal – second place	2007 Rio de Janeiro	Team
Pan American Championships
Silver medal – second place	2004 Maracaibo	Parallel bars
South American Games
Gold medal – first place	2006 Buenos Aires	Team
Silver medal – second place	2006 Buenos Aires	Horizontal bar
Bronze medal – third place	2006 Buenos Aires	Parallel bars

Luiz Augusto dos Anjos (born 7 July 1987) is a Brazilian male artistic gymnast, representing his nation at international competitions, including at the 2007 Pan American Games.
