= Jade Barbosa =

Brazilian artistic gymnast

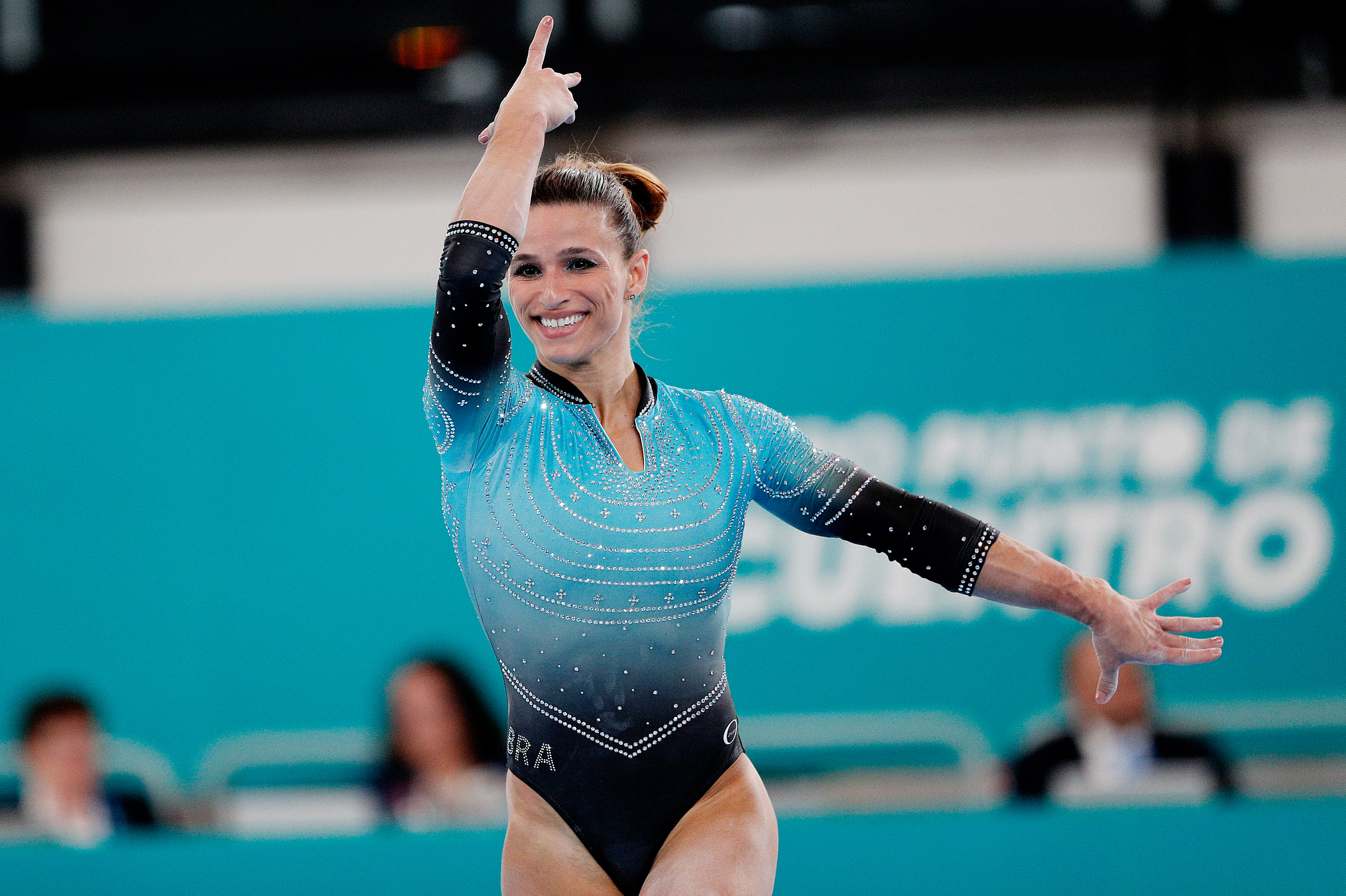
- Barbosa at the 2023 Pan American Games

Personal information
- Full name: Jade Fernandes Barbosa
- Born: 1 July 1991 (age 35) Rio de Janeiro, Brazil
- Height: 151 cm (4 ft 11 in)
- Spouse: Leandro Ferlini (m. 2024)

Gymnastics career
- Discipline: Women's artistic gymnastics
- Country represented: Brazil; (2002–present)
- Club: Clube de Regatas do Flamengo
- Head coach: Francisco Porath
Medal record
Representing Brazil
Women's artistic gymnastics
| Event | 1st | 2nd | 3rd |
|---|---|---|---|
| Olympic Games | 0 | 0 | 1 |
| World Championships | 0 | 1 | 2 |
| Pan American Games | 1 | 2 | 2 |
| Pan American Championships | 0 | 2 | 0 |
| Total | 1 | 5 | 5 |
Olympic Games
| Bronze medal – third place | 2024 Paris | Team |
World Championships
| Silver medal – second place | 2023 Antwerp | Team |
| Bronze medal – third place | 2007 Stuttgart | All-around |
| Bronze medal – third place | 2010 Rotterdam | Vault |
Pan American Games
| Gold medal – first place | 2007 Rio de Janeiro | Vault |
| Silver medal – second place | 2007 Rio de Janeiro | Team |
| Silver medal – second place | 2023 Santiago | Team |
| Bronze medal – third place | 2007 Rio de Janeiro | Floor exercise |
| Bronze medal – third place | 2019 Lima | Team |
Pan American Championships
| Silver medal – second place | 2005 Rio de Janeiro | Team |
| Silver medal – second place | 2018 Lima | Team |
South American Games
| Gold medal – first place | 2006 Buenos Aires | Team |
| Gold medal – first place | 2006 Buenos Aires | All-around |
| Gold medal – first place | 2006 Buenos Aires | Vault |
| Gold medal – first place | 2006 Buenos Aires | Balance beam |
| Gold medal – first place | 2006 Buenos Aires | Floor exercise |
| Gold medal – first place | 2014 Santiago | Team |
| Gold medal – first place | 2014 Santiago | All-around |
| Gold medal – first place | 2014 Santiago | Vault |
| Gold medal – first place | 2018 Cochabamba | Team |
| Silver medal – second place | 2014 Santiago | Uneven bars |
| Silver medal – second place | 2018 Cochabamba | Uneven bars |
| Silver medal – second place | 2018 Cochabamba | Balance beam |
| Bronze medal – third place | 2018 Cochabamba | All-around |
South American Championships
| Gold medal – first place | 2015 Cali | Team |
| Gold medal – first place | 2015 Cali | Uneven bars |
FIG World Cup
| Event | 1st | 2nd | 3rd |
|---|---|---|---|
| World Cup | 0 | 1 | 1 |
| World Challenge Cup | 3 | 2 | 0 |
| Total | 3 | 3 | 1 |

Jade Fernandes Barbosa (born July 1, 1991) is a Brazilian artistic gymnast. She is a two-time individual bronze medalist at the World Championships, and represented Brazil at the 2008, 2016, and 2024 Olympic Games. She was part of the historic teams that won silver at the 2023 World Championships and bronze at the 2024 Olympic Games.

== Gymnastics career ==
Barbosa was the Brazilian junior national champion in the all-around in 2006, and became a senior in 2007.

She has been a popular sports personality in Brazil since her first major appearance at the 2007 Pan American Games in Rio de Janeiro. In December 2007, she was named Brazil's Sportswoman of the Year, an award given in previous years to gymnasts Laís Souza and Daiane dos Santos.

=== 2007 ===
Barbosa won her first medal in a senior international competition at the 2007 Cottbus World Cup in Germany, where she placed second on the vault.

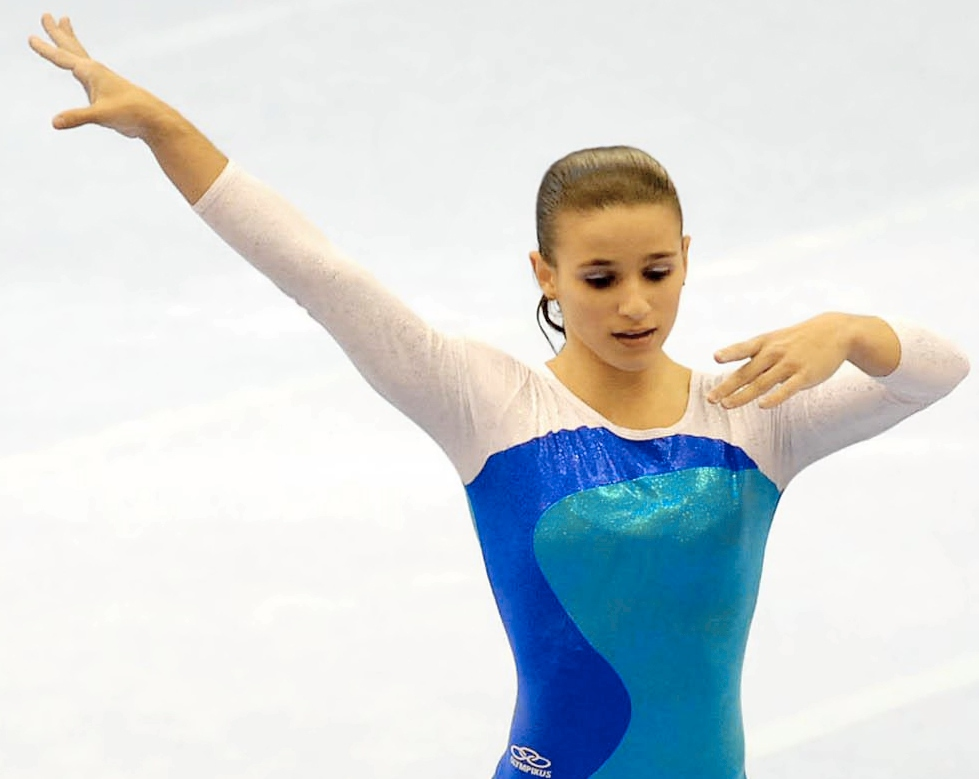
Barbosa at the 2007 Pan American Games

At the 2007 Pan American Games, she placed fourth in the all-around after falling from the uneven bars and balance beam and going out of bounds on floor exercise. The following day, she competed in the vault finals, where she placed first with a score of 14.912, making her the only non-American woman to win a gold medal in gymnastics at the Games. She also won a bronze medal in the floor final, behind Americans Rebecca Bross and Shawn Johnson, and a silver with the Brazilian team.

At the 2007 World Championships, Barbosa tied with Vanessa Ferrari of Italy for the bronze medal in the women's all-around, scoring 15.9 on vault, 14.95 on bars, 15.7 on beam, and 14.0 on floor. She placed fifth in the vault finals, seventh in the beam finals, and fifth with the team, behind the United States, China, Romania, and Italy.

In October 2007, Barbosa took part in the World Cup event in Stuttgart, Germany, and won two silver medals, one on the vault and one on the floor. At the end of the year, she performed a Cheng vault—one of the most difficult vaults in the world, named after the Chinese Olympian Cheng Fei—in a Brazilian competition.

Also in 2007, Barbosa won the Brazilian senior national all-around title (defeating 2006 champion Daniele Hypólito), along with the national titles on vault and balance beam.

=== 2008 ===
Barbosa's first international competition in 2008 was the Cottbus World Cup. She won two silver medals there, one on vault and the other on floor.

In May 2008, Barbosa took part in the World Cup event in Moscow. During the vault finals, she was expected to perform an Amanar—a Yurchenko vault with 2.5 twists—but instead, she performed a double-twisting Yurchenko and a laid-out Podkopayeva. She won the gold medal, tied with Russian gymnast Anna Pavlova.

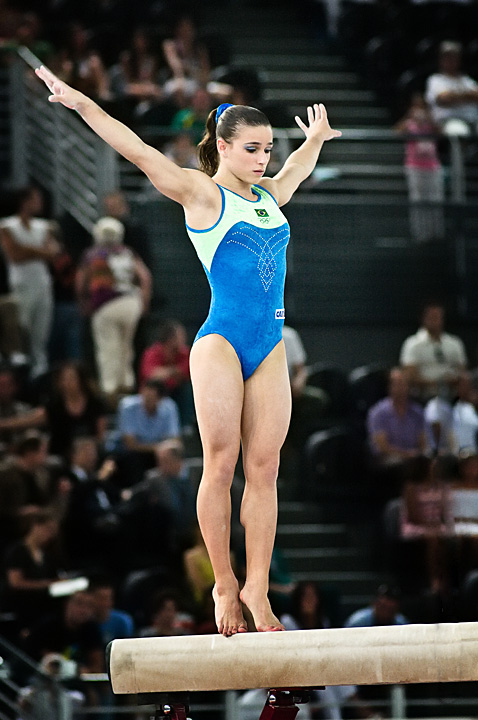
Barbosa in Rome on July 5, 2008

In June, Barbosa won the silver medal in the all-around at the Brazilian National Championships, behind Ana Claudia Silva and ahead of Hypólito. She also won gold medals on beam, vault, and floor exercise. Later in the same month, Barbosa was the all-around champion at the Vitaly Scherbo International Gymnastics Cup, where Brazil also won a team gold medal.

At the 2008 Olympics in Beijing, Barbosa helped Brazil qualify to the team finals, where they placed eighth. Individually, she qualified to the all-around finals in eighth place and to the vault finals in seventh. She fell on floor and vault in the all-around final and finished tenth, followed by a seventh-place finish on vault.

=== 2009–12 ===
Barbosa had a serious injury after the Olympics and was unable to compete for some months. In 2009, she competed at Nationals and placed first on floor exercise, beating Ethiene Franco and Priscila Cobello.

Her first major international competition after the Olympics was the 2010 World Championships, where she placed fifteenth in the all-around and third in the vault final, behind Alicia Sacramone and Aliya Mustafina. The following year she placed fourth on vault at the 2011 World Championships after twisting her ankle on her second vault. Brazil placed 14th in the team competition, which was not enough to qualify a full team to the 2012 Olympics.

At the 2012 Olympic Test Event, however, Brazil had a second opportunity to qualify to the Olympics, and was successful. Barbosa also won an individual gold medal on vault at the Test Event. She was not selected for the 2012 Summer Olympics because of a contract dispute with the Brazilian federation. Barbosa struggled with injuries and returned to gymnastics in June 2015 after undergoing surgery on her right knee.

=== 2016 ===
Barbosa qualified for the 2016 Summer Olympics through the test event held in April. She contributed an overall score of 55.823 toward the Brazil team's first-place finish.

In qualifications on 7 August, Barbosa finished in 23rd place with an overall score of 56.499, behind teammates Rebeca Andrade and Flávia Saraiva. In the team final on 9 August, she contributed scores of 14.933 on vault, 14.391 on uneven bars, 13.033 on balance beam and 14.266 on floor toward the team's eighth-place finish.

Barbosa was substituted in for teammate Flávia Saraiva by the Brazilian federation for the all-around final on 11 August, reportedly so that Saraiva could concentrate on preparing for the balance beam final. Barbosa scored 13.700 on balance beam, but she suffered an injury while performing her floor routine and had to withdraw. As a result, she did not finish.

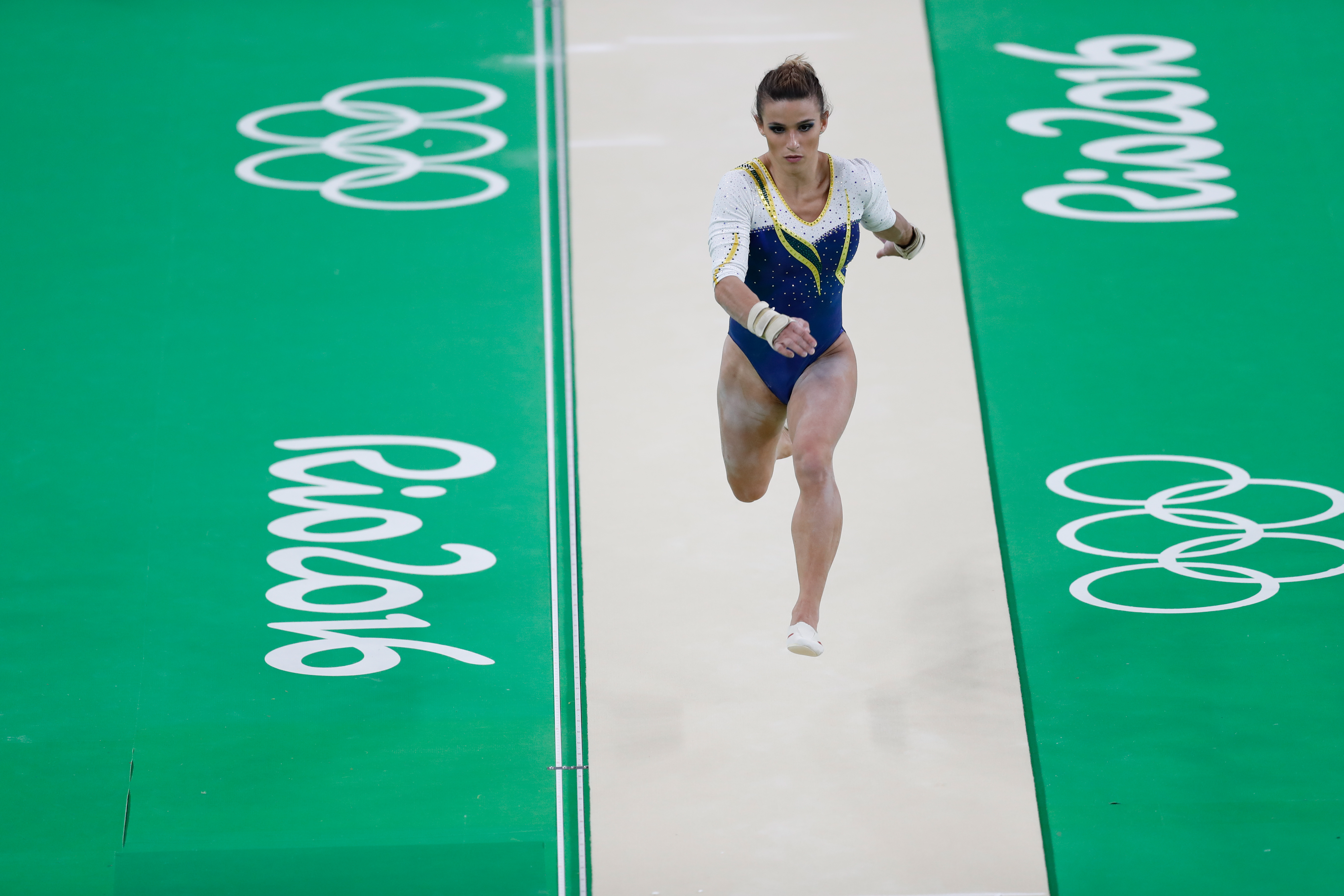
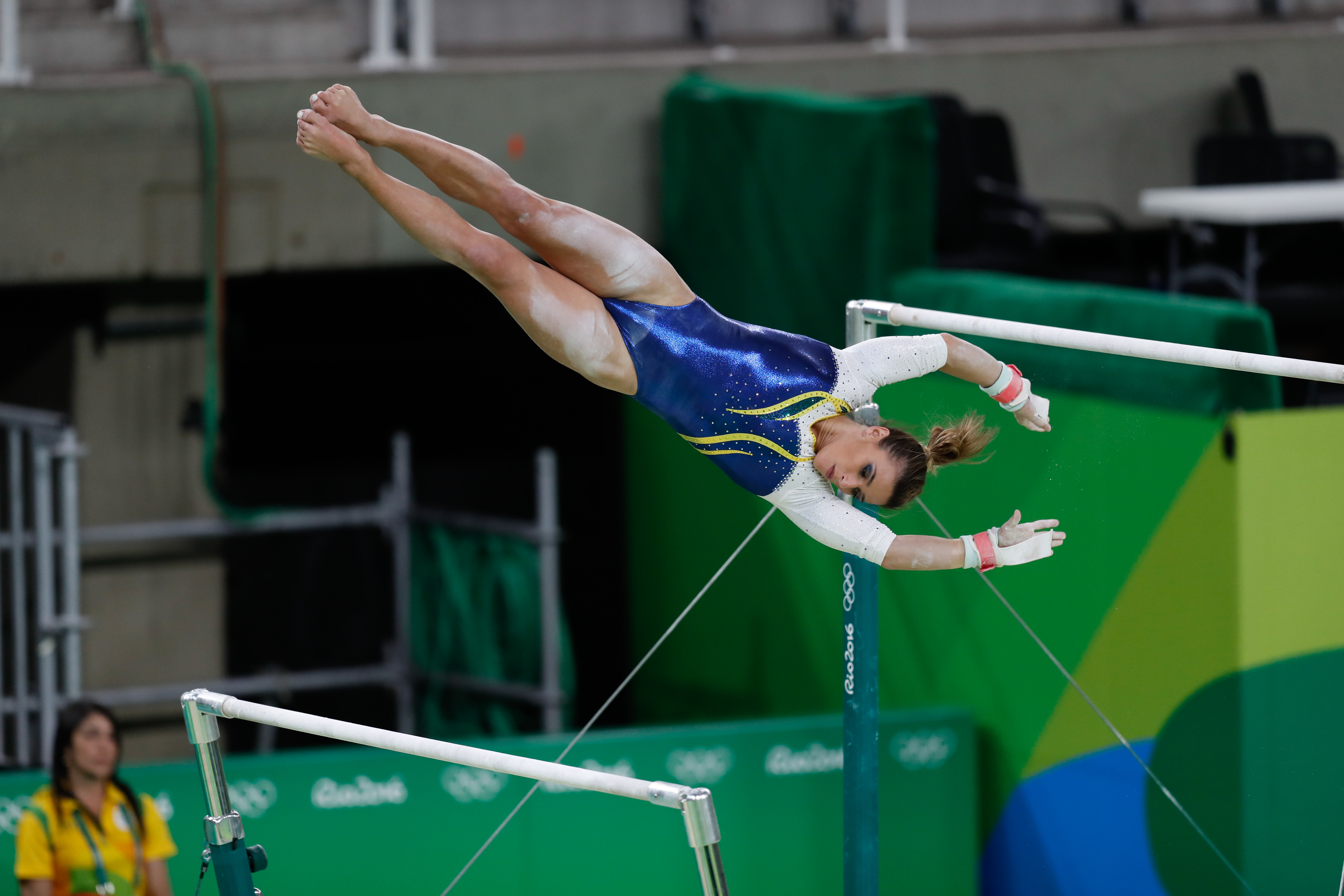
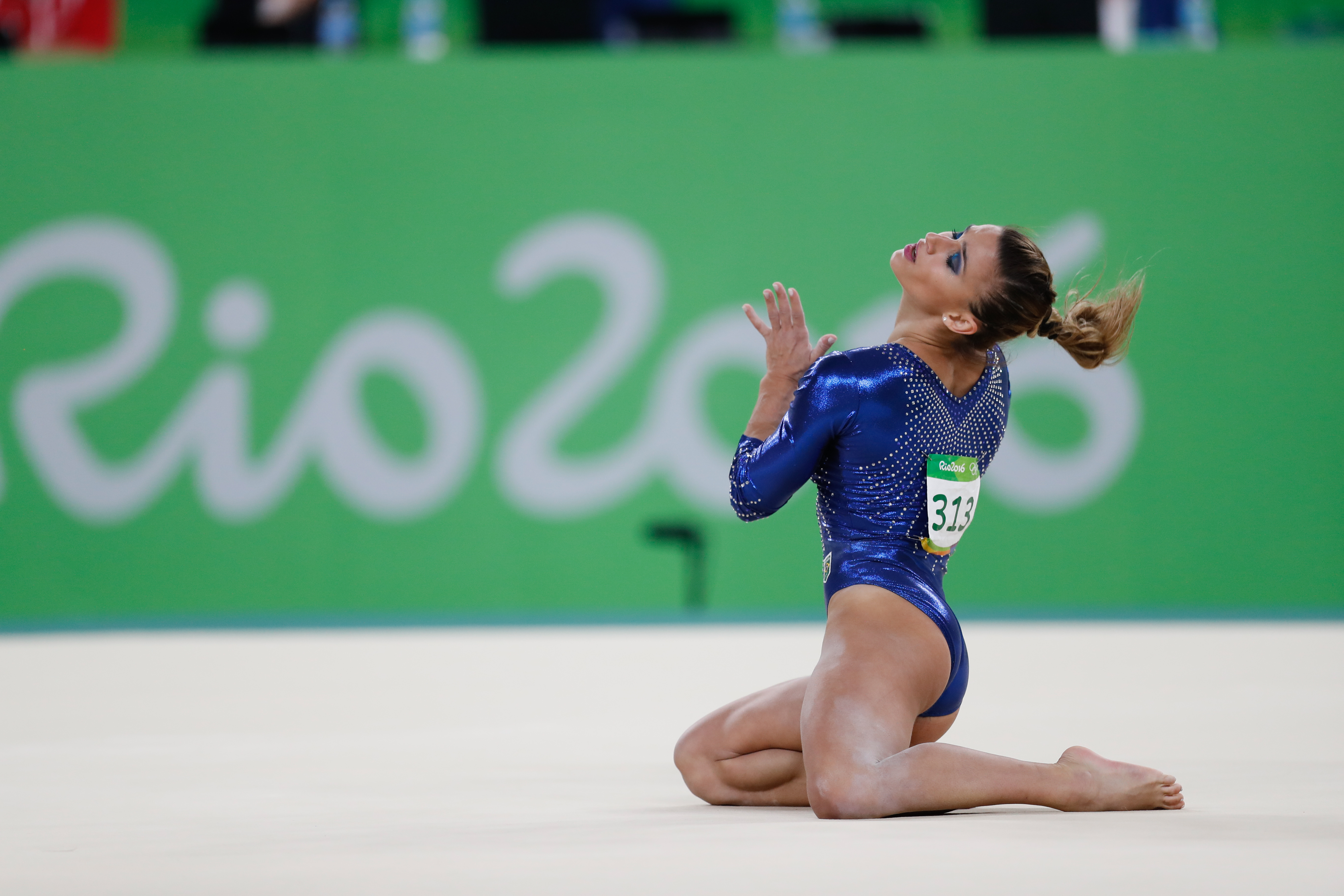
Barbosa at the 2016 Summer Olympics

=== 2017 ===
Barbosa spent early 2017 competing on the inaugural season of Dancing Brasil, where she was partnered with Lucas Teodoro. They ended up finishing second in the competition behind actress Maytê Piragibe. In August Barbosa returned to competition at the Brazilian Championships where she placed fourth in the all-around qualifications but withdrew from the final due to injury, later revealed to be a stress fracture in her shin. She placed second on uneven bars. She spent the remainder of the season recovering.

=== 2018 ===
Barbosa returned to competition at the City of Jesolo Trophy where she helped Brazil finish second behind Russia, and individually she placed sixth in the all-around and on uneven bars and placed fourth on balance beam. In May Barbosa competed at the South American Games where she helped Brazil win team gold. Individually, she won bronze in the all-around behind Martina Dominici of Argentina and compatriot Flávia Saraiva. She additionally won silver on uneven bars and balance beam, once again behind Saraiva. At the Brazilian Championships, Barbosa won silver behind Daniele Hypólito and at the event championships she won gold on uneven bars and silver on balance beam, behind Saraiva.

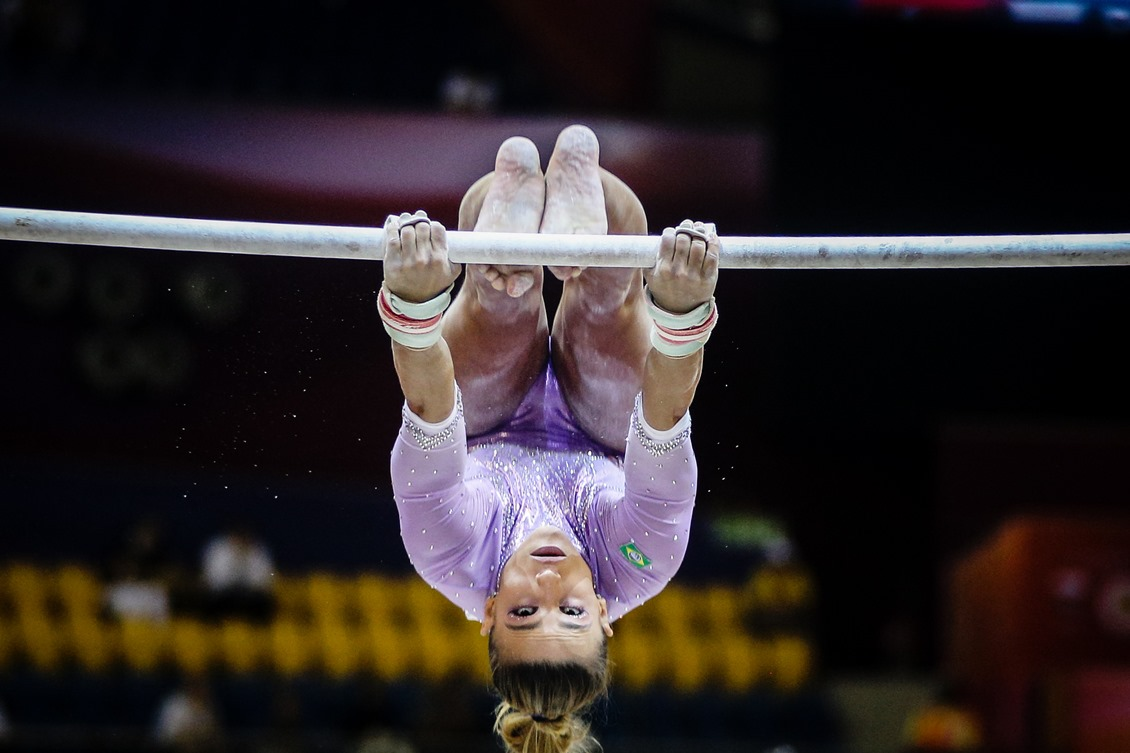
Barbosa competing on the uneven bars at the 2018 World Championships

In September Barbosa competed at the Pan American Championships where she helped Brazil win the team silver behind the United States. Individually, she placed seventh in the all-around and on uneven bars and sixth on floor exercise. At the World Championships in October, Barbosa helped Brazil qualify to the team final for the first time since the 2007 World Championships, Barbosa's first year as a senior elite. Brazil ended up finishing in seventh place. Individually, Barbosa finished fifteenth in the all-around.

In November Barbosa competed at the Arthur Gander Memorial in Chiasso, Switzerland, where she placed first in the three-event all-around, ahead of Saraiva and Eythora Thorsdottir of the Netherlands. A few days later, Barbosa competed at the Swiss Cup, where she was partnered with Canadian gymnast Cory Paterson to form the Pan American team. They won bronze behind the German team of Marcel Nguyen and Elisabeth Seitz and the Russian team of Angelina Melnikova and Nikita Nagornyy. The following week she competed at the Cottbus World Cup where she won silver on floor exercise behind compatriot Saraiva and placed seventh on vault.

=== 2019 ===
In March Barbosa competed at the DTB Team Challenge in Stuttgart, Germany where she helped Brazil win the team gold, ahead of second place Russia. In June she competed at the Brazilian National Championships where she placed third in the all-around behind Thais Fidelis and Flávia Saraiva. She additionally won silver on floor exercise and bronze on uneven bars.

In July Barbosa was slated to compete at the 2019 Pan American Games. While there she sustained a minor injury and sat out the competition but still won the bronze medal alongside her team in the team final due to Brazil not replacing her with an alternate.

In October Barbosa competed at the World Championships. During qualifications, she injured her knee on the vault and was unable to finish the competition. This injury followed Rebeca Andrade's ACL injury earlier in the year and Carolyne Pedro's injury right before qualifications. As a result, Brazil finished 14th in qualifications and did not qualify to the team final nor did they qualify a team to the 2020 Olympic Games in Tokyo. The following month Barbosa underwent surgery on her ACL, but doubted she would be recovered in time to qualify for the Olympics via the World Cup series or the 2020 Pan American Gymnastics Championships.

=== 2020–23 ===
Barbosa spent the next few years recovering from injuries and other setbacks. She competed at various domestic competitions in 2021 and 2022 but was limited to uneven bars and balance beam. In August 2023, Barbosa made her all-around comeback at that year's national championships. After the two-day competition, Barbosa placed first in the all-around, a feat she last achieved in 2007. Additionally she placed first on floor exercise and third on uneven bars behind Rebeca Andrade and Lorrane Oliveira. Barbosa next competed at the 2023 Paris World Challenge Cup, where she took the silver medal in the floor exercise final behind Mélanie de Jesus dos Santos. In October 2023, Barbosa competed at the World Championships along with teammates Rebeca Andrade, Lorrane Oliveira, Flávia Saraiva and Júlia Soares. The team took the silver medal behind the United States — Brazil's first team medal in World Championship history. Later that month, Barbosa competed at the Pan American Games, where the Brazilian team once again took silver behind the United States. Individually, Barbosa finished fourth in the all-around final.

=== 2024 ===
Barbosa began the year competing at the Antalya World Challenge Cup where she won gold on floor exercise. She next competed at the 2024 City of Jesolo Trophy where she helped Brazil place second behind Italy. At the Brazil Trophy, she won silver on uneven bars, gold on floor exercise, and placed seventh on balance beam.

Barbosa was selected to represent Brazil at the 2024 Olympic Games alongside Rebeca Andrade, Flávia Saraiva, Lorrane Oliveira, and Julia Soares. During the qualification round Barbosa competed on all four events, helping Brazil qualify to the team final. Individually, Barbosa placed 20th in the all-around, which would have qualified her to the final had teammates Andrade and Saraiva not qualified in a higher position. During the team final Barbosa competed only on vault, helping Brazil win the bronze medal, their first Olympic team medal in history.

== Personal life ==
Barbosa became a prominent sports figure in Brazil following her first major appearance at the 2007 Pan American Games in Rio de Janeiro, and developed a fan base among young girls and teenagers in the country. In December 2007, Barbosa was elected Brazil's Sportswoman of the year, an award also given in previous years to gymnasts Laís Souza and Daiane dos Santos.

Barbosa married her longtime partner, Leandro Ferlini, on September 28, 2024. On June 1, 2025, Barbosa announced that they were expecting their first child. Their daughter, Eva, was born in November 2025.

== Competitive history ==
Competitive history of Jade Barbosa at the junior level
| Year | Event | Team | AA | VT | UB | BB | FX |
|---|---|---|---|---|---|---|---|
| 2002 | Brazilian Championships | | 4 | | | | |
| 2003 | Brazilian Championships | 1st place, gold medalist(s) | 1st place, gold medalist(s) | 1st place, gold medalist(s) | 1st place, gold medalist(s) | 1st place, gold medalist(s) | 1st place, gold medalist(s) |
2004
| 2004 | Pan American Championships | 3rd place, bronze medalist(s) | 5 | 2nd place, silver medalist(s) | | 4 | 1st place, gold medalist(s) |
| 2004 | Brazilian Championships | 2nd place, silver medalist(s) | 1st place, gold medalist(s) | 1st place, gold medalist(s) | 3rd place, bronze medalist(s) | 3rd place, bronze medalist(s) | 1st place, gold medalist(s) |
| 2005 | Brazilian Championships | 1st place, gold medalist(s) | 1st place, gold medalist(s) | 1st place, gold medalist(s) | 2nd place, silver medalist(s) | 2nd place, silver medalist(s) | 1st place, gold medalist(s) |
| 2005 | Pan American Championships | 2nd place, silver medalist(s) | 11 | | | | |
| 2006 | Brazilian Championships | 2nd place, silver medalist(s) | 1st place, gold medalist(s) | | 2nd place, silver medalist(s) | | |
| 2006 | South American Games | 1st place, gold medalist(s) | 1st place, gold medalist(s) | 1st place, gold medalist(s) | | 1st place, gold medalist(s) | 1st place, gold medalist(s) |

Competitive history of Jade Barbosa at the senior level
| Year | Event | Team | AA | VT | UB | BB | FX |
|---|---|---|---|---|---|---|---|
| 2007 | Brazilian Championships | 1st place, gold medalist(s) | 1st place, gold medalist(s) | 1st place, gold medalist(s) | | 2nd place, silver medalist(s) | 2nd place, silver medalist(s) |
| 2007 | Stuttgart World Cup | | | 2nd place, silver medalist(s) | 8 | 4 | 2nd place, silver medalist(s) |
| 2007 | Cottbus World Cup | | | 2nd place, silver medalist(s) | | 8 | 5 |
| 2007 | Paris World Cup | | | 4 | | 7 | |
| 2007 | Pan American Games | 2nd place, silver medalist(s) | 4 | 1st place, gold medalist(s) | | 4 | 3rd place, bronze medalist(s) |
| 2007 | World Championships | 5 | 3rd place, bronze medalist(s) | 5 | | 7 | |
| 2008 | Cottbus World Cup | | | 2nd place, silver medalist(s) | | 6 | 2nd place, silver medalist(s) |
| 2008 | Moscow World Cup | | | 1st place, gold medalist(s) | | 7 | 8 |
| 2008 | Brazilian Championships | | 3rd place, bronze medalist(s) | 1st place, gold medalist(s) | | | |
| 2008 | Olympic Games | 8 | 10 | 7 | | | |
| 2009 | Brazilian Championships | | 6 | 4 | | | 1st place, gold medalist(s) |
| 2010 | Brazil Trophy | | 1st place, gold medalist(s) | | | | |
| 2010 | Brazilian Championships | | 3rd place, bronze medalist(s) | 1st place, gold medalist(s) | | | |
| 2010 | World Championships | | 15 | 3rd place, bronze medalist(s) | | | |
| 2011 | Moscow World Cup | | | 3rd place, bronze medalist(s) | | | |
| 2011 | Brazilian Championships | 1st place, gold medalist(s) | 2nd place, silver medalist(s) | 1st place, gold medalist(s) | | 3rd place, bronze medalist(s) | 1st place, gold medalist(s) |
| 2011 | Ghent World Cup | | | 1st place, gold medalist(s) | | | |
| 2011 | World Championships | | | 4 | | | |
| 2013 | Anadia World Cup | | | 1st place, gold medalist(s) | | 4 | 8 |
| 2014 | Brazilian Championships | | 2nd place, silver medalist(s) | 1st place, gold medalist(s) | 2nd place, silver medalist(s) | | |
| 2015 | South American Championships | | | 1st place, gold medalist(s) | | | |
| 2015 | Osijek World Cup | | | | | 1st place, gold medalist(s) | |
| 2015 | Länderkampf Kunstturnen | 1st place, gold medalist(s) | 5 | | | | |
| 2015 | Brazilian Championships | | 2nd place, silver medalist(s) | | 3rd place, bronze medalist(s) | 1st place, gold medalist(s) | |
| 2016 | Houston Invitational | | | | 2nd place, silver medalist(s) | | |
| 2016 | City of Jesolo Trophy | 2nd place, silver medalist(s) | 9 | | 6 | | |
| 2016 | Olympic Test Event | 1st place, gold medalist(s) | 5 | | | 8 | |
| 2016 | Olympic Games | 8 | DNF | | | | |
| 2017 | Brazilian Championships | | | | 2nd place, silver medalist(s) | | |
| 2018 | City of Jesolo Trophy | 2nd place, silver medalist(s) | 6 | | 6 | 4 | |
| 2018 | South American Games | 1st place, gold medalist(s) | 3rd place, bronze medalist(s) | | 2nd place, silver medalist(s) | 2nd place, silver medalist(s) | |
| 2018 | Brazilian Championships | | 2nd place, silver medalist(s) | | | | |
| 2018 | Brazilian Event Championships | | | | 1st place, gold medalist(s) | 2nd place, silver medalist(s) | |
| 2018 | Pan American Championships | 2nd place, silver medalist(s) | 7 | | 7 | 13 | 6 |
| 2018 | World Championships | 7 | 15 | | | | |
| 2018 | Arthur Gander Memorial | | 1st place, gold medalist(s) | | | | |
| 2018 | Swiss Cup | 3rd place, bronze medalist(s) | | | | | |
| 2018 | Cottbus World Cup | | | 6 | | | 2nd place, silver medalist(s) |
| 2019 | EnBW DTB-Pokal Team Cup | 1st place, gold medalist(s) | | | | | |
| 2019 | Brazilian Championships | | 3rd place, bronze medalist(s) | | 3rd place, bronze medalist(s) | | 2nd place, silver medalist(s) |
| 2019 | Pan American Games | 3rd place, bronze medalist(s) | | | | | |
| 2021 | Brazilian Championships | 1st place, gold medalist(s) | | | 2nd place, silver medalist(s) | 2nd place, silver medalist(s) | |
| 2022 | Brazil Trophy | | | | 2nd place, silver medalist(s) | 8 | |
| 2023 | Brazil Trophy | | | | 3rd place, bronze medalist(s) | | |
| 2023 | Brazilian Championships | 1st place, gold medalist(s) | 1st place, gold medalist(s) | | 3rd place, bronze medalist(s) | 8 | 1st place, gold medalist(s) |
| 2023 | Paris World Challenge Cup | | | | | | 2nd place, silver medalist(s) |
| 2023 | World Championships | 2nd place, silver medalist(s) | | | | | |
| 2023 | Pan American Games | 2nd place, silver medalist(s) | 4 | | | | |
| 2024 | Antalya World Challenge Cup | | | | | | 1st place, gold medalist(s) |
| 2024 | City of Jesolo Trophy | 2nd place, silver medalist(s) | 27 | | | | |
| 2024 | Brazil Trophy | | | | 2nd place, silver medalist(s) | 8 | 1st place, gold medalist(s) |
| 2024 | Olympic Games | 3rd place, bronze medalist(s) | | | | | |

== Floor music ==
| Year | Music Title |
|---|---|
| 2005–2009 | Berimbau |
| 2010 | La Danza del Tezcatlipoca Rojo |
| 2011–2014 | Pirates of the Caribbean |
| 2014–2018 | Child of Nazareth |
| 2019–2023 | Cell Block Tango |
| 2024 | ...Baby One More Time |

== Top scores ==
=== 2006–08 Code of Points ===
- Vault: 15.95 (team qualifications, 2007 World Artistic Gymnastics Championships)
- Bars: 15.25 (team qualifications, 2007 World Artistic Gymnastics Championships)
- Beam: 15.7 (all-around final, 2007 World Artistic Gymnastics Championships)
- Floor: 15.325 (team qualifications, 2007 Pan American Games)

=== 2009–12 Code of Points ===
- Vault: 14.966 (vault final, 2012 Gymnastics Olympic Test Event)
- Bars: 13.650 (team final, 2011 Brazilian Nationals)
- Beam: 14.800 (team final, 2011 Brazilian Nationals)
- Floor: 14.000 (all-around final, 2011 Brazil Trophy)
