= Diego Hypólito =

Brazilian gymnast (born 1986)

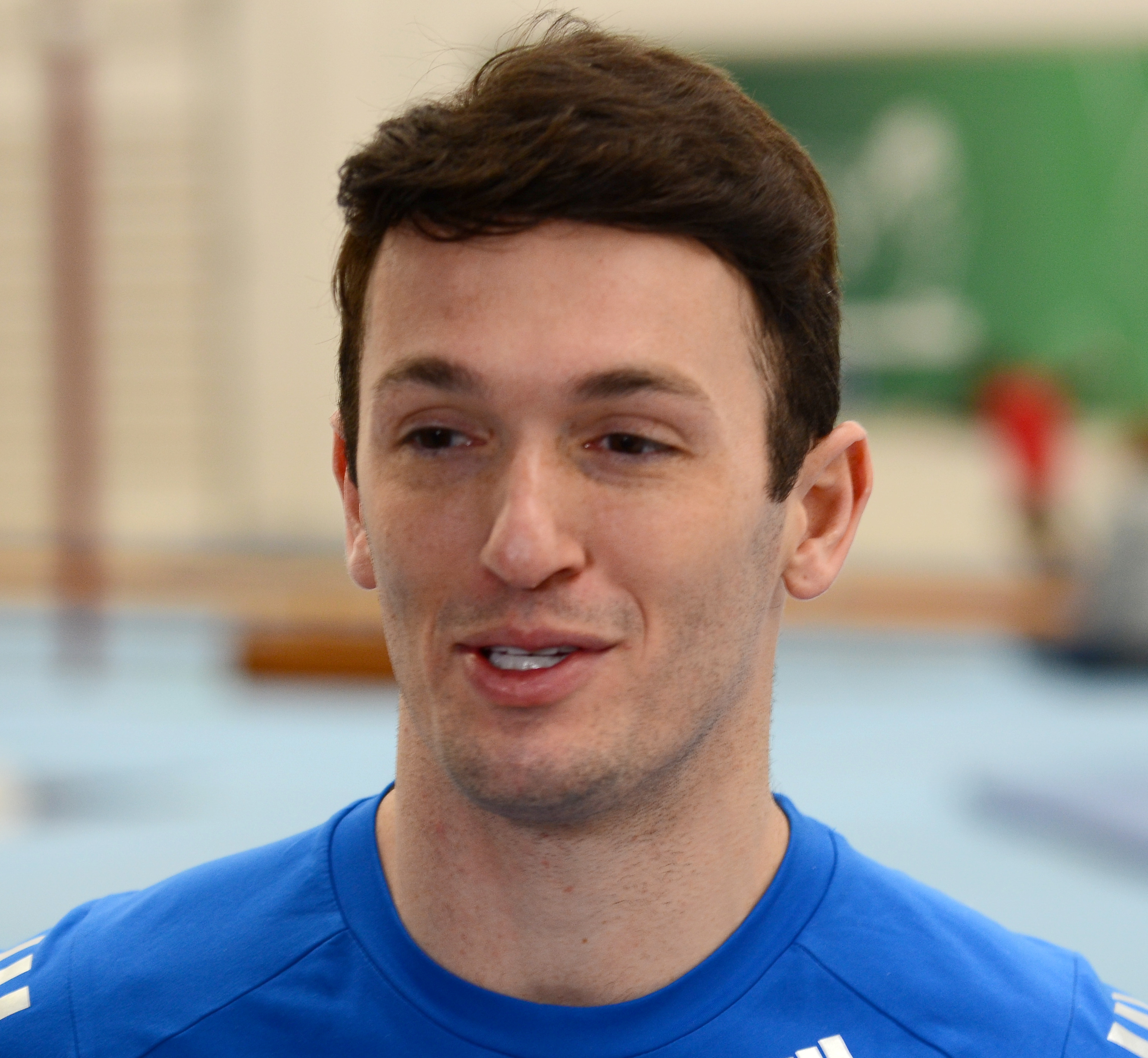
- Hypólito in 2016

Personal information
- Full name: Diego Matias Hypólito
- Born: 19 June 1986 (age 40) Santo André, Brazil
- Height: 170 cm (5 ft 7 in)
- Relatives: Daniele Hypólito (sister)

Gymnastics career
- Discipline: Men's artistic gymnastics
- Country represented: Brazil
- Club: CR Flamengo
- Head coach: Renato Araújo
- Eponymous skills: Hypólito (floor exercise)
- Retired: 2019
Medal record
Representing Brazil
Men's artistic gymnastics
Event	1st	2nd	3rd
Olympic Games	0	1	0
World Championships	2	1	2
World Cup Final	3	0	1
Pan American Games	5	3	0
Pan American Championships	1	2	1
Total	11	7	4
Olympic Games
Silver medal – second place	2016 Rio de Janeiro	Floor exercise
World Championships
Gold medal – first place	2005 Melbourne	Floor exercise
Gold medal – first place	2007 Stuttgart	Floor exercise
Silver medal – second place	2006 Aarhus	Floor exercise
Bronze medal – third place	2011 Tokyo	Floor exercise
Bronze medal – third place	2014 Nanning	Floor exercise
World Cup Final
Gold medal – first place	2004 Birmingham	Floor exercise
Gold medal – first place	2006 São Paulo	Floor exercise
Gold medal – first place	2008 Madrid	Floor exercise
Bronze medal – third place	2006 São Paulo	Vault
Pan American Games
Gold medal – first place	2007 Rio de Janeiro	Vault
Gold medal – first place	2007 Rio de Janeiro	Floor exercise
Gold medal – first place	2011 Guadalajara	Team
Gold medal – first place	2011 Guadalajara	Floor exercise
Gold medal – first place	2011 Guadalajara	Vault
Silver medal – second place	2003 Santo Domingo	Team
Silver medal – second place	2003 Santo Domingo	Vault
Silver medal – second place	2007 Rio de Janeiro	Team
Pan American Championships
Gold medal – first place	2013 San Juan	Floor exercise
Silver medal – second place	2013 San Juan	Vault
Silver medal – second place	2014 Mississauga	Floor exercise
Bronze medal – third place	2014 Mississauga	Team
South American Games
Gold medal – first place	2010 Medellín	Team
Gold medal – first place	2010 Medellín	Floor exercise
Gold medal – first place	2010 Medellín	Vault
South American Championships
Gold medal – first place	2011 Santiago	Team
Silver medal – second place	2011 Santiago	Floor exercise
Silver medal – second place	2011 Santiago	Vault

Diego Matias Hypólito (Brazilian Portuguese: [dʒiˈeɡu iˈpɔlitu]; born 19 June 1986) is a Brazilian gymnast, the 2005 and 2007 World Champion in the floor exercise. He is the first male gymnast from Brazil, and South America, to win a medal at the World Championships. He also won 63 medals in the World Cup. Hypólito has represented Brazil at the 2008, 2012, and 2016 Olympic Games. He received the silver medal in floor exercise at the 2016 Olympic Games.

He is the brother of Daniele Hypólito, the first Brazilian gymnast to win a medal at the World Championships.

== Early life ==
Hypólito was born in Santo André, São Paulo, but moved to the city of Rio de Janeiro. He is the son of a bus driver, Wagner Hypólito, and a seamstress, Geni Matias. He has Greek ancestry through his father (the surname Hypólito comes from the Greek surname Hippolyte, which was translated when his ancestors had immigrated to Brazil); he is also of Portuguese descent, through his mother.

As a child, he had his first contact with the sport at the Flamengo Rowing Club, the same one his sister, Daniele, used to train. At her insistence, he specialized in solo exercises, in which he won his first titles as infantil and later as júnior.

== Gymnastics career ==
Hypólito began gymnastics at age seven, following in his older sister's footsteps. He won the floor exercise event in the children's division at 1997's Brazilian National Championships and was 2001's all-around junior national champion.

By the age of 21, Hypólito had competed at the 2002, 2003, 2005, 2006 and the 2007 World Championships. A floor exercise specialist, he qualified for the floor event finals in all five competitions, placing fifth in 2002, fourth in 2003, earning a gold medal in 2005, a silver medal in 2006, and a gold medal again in 2007. With his 2005 win, Hypólito became the first male South American gymnast to medal at the World Championships.

In the spring of 2008, Hypólito contracted dengue fever. However, he was able to recover and resume training in time to compete at the 2008 Olympics in Beijing, where he was Brazil's only MAG representative. In the preliminary round of competition, he performed on floor and vault, and qualified to the floor event final in first place with a score of 15.950. In the floor finals, he fell on his last tumbling pass to finish the meet in sixth place.

Hypólito was one of three male Brazilians in artistic gymnastics at the 2012 Summer Olympics, but he was eliminated during the qualification stage. However, in the 2016 Summer Olympics, held in his home country, he finished fourth in qualification for the floor exercise, and won a silver medal in the individual event final.

== Eponymous skills ==
Hypólito has one skill on floor exercise officially named after him called the Hypólito on floor, which was successfully completed when he won the gold medal on the individual floor event at the 2006 FIG Artistic Gymnastics World Cup Final in São Paulo, Brazil, defeating the then reigning Olympic floor champion, Kyle Shewfelt of Canada, in the process. The skill is a full-twisting Arabian double (front) layout and was assigned a D-score of F (0.6).

== Personal life ==
Hypólito was in a relationship with lawyer Marcus Duarte between 2018 and 2020.

Hypólito came out as gay in May 2019. In an article for UOL Esporte, Hypólito described many years of struggling with his sexuality because of his deeply religious upbringing, but wrote, "I want people to know that I'm gay and that I'm not ashamed of it."

In December 2019, he claimed to have been a Christian since childhood and to attend Bola de Neve Church every week.

Alongside his sister Daniele, he entered Big Brother Brasil as a contestant in its 25th season.
