= 1998 South American Games =

Multi-sport event in Cuenca, Ecuador

VI South American Games
- 1998 South American Games logo
- Host city: Cuenca
- Country: Ecuador
- Nations: 14
- Athletes: 1,525
- Events: 357 in 24 sports
- Opening: October 21, 1998
- Closing: October 31, 1998
- Opened by: Gustavo Noboa
- Athlete's Oath: Francisco Encalada; Eliana González
- Torch lighter: Jefferson Pérez
- Main venue: Estadio Alejandro Serrano Aguilar

The VI South American Games (Spanish: Juegos Sudamericanos; Portuguese: Jogos Sul-Americanos) were a multi-sport event held in 1998 in Cuenca, Azuay, Ecuador, with some events in Azogues (futsal), Gualaceo (boxing), Guayaquil (bowling, canoeing, sailing, triathlon), Paute (wrestling), and Quito (fencing). The Games were organized by the South American Sports Organization (ODESUR). An appraisal of the games and detailed medal lists were published elsewhere, emphasizing the results of the Argentinian teams.

The games were officially opened by Ecuadorian vice-president Gustavo Noboa. Torch lighter at the Estadio Alejandro Serrano Aguilar was Olympic gold medalist, racewalker Jefferson Pérez. In honour of the peace treaty between Ecuador and Peru soon to be signed on October 26, 1998, officially ending the recent Cenepa War, the athlete's oath was sworn jointly by Ecuadorian cyclist Francisco Encalada and Peruvian table tennis player Eliana González.

The games were initially scheduled for May 1998, but were postponed mainly because of severe flooding caused by the El Niño climate phenomenon which resulted in more than 300 deaths. For the first time, Guyana participated at the games. However, the Netherlands Antilles were not present, reducing the number of participating countries to 14, as in the year 1994.

== Participants ==
14 ODESUR members participated on the games, Guyana debuted on the games for the first time, Netherlands Antilles did not participated on the games

- Argentina
- Aruba
- Bolivia
- Brazil
- Chile
- Colombia
- Ecuador (Hosts)
- Guyana
- Panama
- Paraguay
- Peru
- Suriname
- Uruguay
- Venezuela

== Medal count ==
The medal count for these Games is tabulated below. This table is sorted by the number of gold medals earned by each country. The number of silver medals is taken into consideration next, and then the number of bronze medals.

* Host nation (Ecuador)

Rank	Nation	Gold	Silver	Bronze	Total
1	Argentina (ARG)	101	60	74	235
2	Colombia (COL)	74	51	54	179
3	Brazil (BRA)	50	59	44	153
4	Venezuela (VEN)	50	47	29	126
5	Ecuador (ECU)*	33	46	70	149
6	Chile (CHI)	29	54	46	129
7	Peru (PER)	9	23	38	70
8	Suriname (SUR)	4	0	3	7
9	Bolivia (BOL)	2	7	18	27
10	Uruguay (URU)	2	7	17	26
11	Panama (PAN)	2	2	2	6
12	Paraguay (PAR)	1	1	4	6
13	Aruba (ARU)	0	0	2	2
14	Guyana (GUY)	0	0	0	0
Totals (14 entries)		357	357	401	1,115

== Sports ==
- Aquatic sports
  - Swimming
- Athletics
- Bodybuilding
- Bowling
- Boxing
- Canoeing
- Cycling
  - Mountain Biking
  - Road Cycling
  - Track Cycling
- Fencing
- Futsal
- Gymnastics
  - Artistic Gymnastics
  - Rhythmic Gymnastics
- Judo
- Karate
- Racquetball
- Roller sports
  - Artistic roller skating
  - Roller speed skating
- Rowing
- Sailing
- Shooting
- Table Tennis
- Taekwondo
- Tennis
- Triathlon
- Weightlifting
- Wrestling
