= 2002 South American Games =

Multi-sport event in Brazil

VII South American Games
- 2002 South American Games logo
- Host city: Belém, Curitiba, Rio de Janeiro, São Paulo
- Country: Brazil
- Nations: 14
- Athletes: 2,069
- Events: 380 in 24 sports
- Opening: August 1, 2002
- Closing: August 11, 2002
- Opened by: Each host city has your own opening ceremonies

The VII South American Games (Spanish: Juegos Sudamericanos; Portuguese: Jogos Sul-Americanos) were a multi-sport event held in 2002 in Rio de Janeiro, São Paulo, Curitiba, and Belém; all in Brazil. The Games were organized by the South American Sports Organization (ODESUR).

In Belém, the games were officially opened by the governor of the state of Pará, Almir Gabriel. Torch lighter was bowler Dayse Silva.

Originally awarded to Córdoba, Argentina, the Games were moved to Bogotá, Colombia, following an economic crisis in Argentina. Later, violence between the Colombian government and guerrillas caused Bolivia, Chile, Paraguay and Venezuela to threaten to leave the Games, which resulted in the relocation to Brazil. Colombia boycotted the games in a protest of this decision.

== Participants ==
13 ODESUR members participated on the games. Netherlands Antilles returned to the games, while Colombia boycotted the games as a response of the country being stripped of its hosting rights.

- Aruba
- Argentina
- Bolivia
- Brazil (Hosts)
- Chile
- Ecuador
- Guyana
- Netherlands Antilles
- Panama
- Paraguay
- Peru
- Suriname
- Uruguay
- Venezuela

== Medal count ==
The medal count for these Games is tabulated below. This table is sorted by the number of gold medals earned by each country. The number of silver medals is taken into consideration next, and then the number of bronze medals.

* Host nation (Brazil)

Rank	Nation	Gold	Silver	Bronze	Total
1	Brazil (BRA)*	148	95	90	333
2	Venezuela (VEN)	97	70	64	231
3	Argentina (ARG)	76	89	80	245
4	Chile (CHI)	24	41	46	111
5	Ecuador (ECU)	23	32	37	92
6	Peru (PER)	6	28	30	64
7	Netherlands Antilles (AHO)	3	2	7	12
8	Uruguay (URU)	2	8	21	31
9	Panama (PAN)	1	5	6	12
10	Paraguay (PAR)	0	1	8	9
11	Guyana (GUY)	0	1	7	8
12	Aruba (ARU)	0	1	2	3
13	Bolivia (BOL)	0	0	9	9
Totals (13 entries)		380	373	407	1,160

== Sports ==
- Archery
- Athletics^{†}
- Basketball
- Bowling
- Boxing
- Canoeing
- Cycling
- Fencing
- Futsal
- Golf
- Gymnastics
- Judo
- Handball
- Karate
- Roller sports
- Rowing
- Sailing
- Shooting
- Swimming^{‡}
- Triathlon
- Table Tennis^{†}
- Taekwondo
- Tennis^{‡}
- Weightlifting
- Wrestling

=== Notes ===
^{†}: The competition was contested by junior representatives (U-20).

^{‡}: The competition was contested by youth representatives (U-18).

== Venues ==
=== Belem ===
- Estádio do Mangueirão - Athletics
- Ginásio da Escola Superior de Educação Física - Aquatics, Boxing and Wrestling

=== Curitiba ===
- Iguaçu Park - Canoeing
- Curitba-Paranagua Highway - Cycling (road)
- Barigui Park - Cycling (Mountain Bike)
- Botanical Garden Velodrome - Cycling (track)
- Tarumã Gymnasium - Gymnastics

=== Rio de Janeiro ===
- Botafogo Gymnasium - Fencing
- Maracanazinho Gymnasium - Futsal
- Tijuca Tennis Club - Judo, Taekwondo
- Lagoa Rodrigo de Freitas - Rowing
- Centro de Educação Física Almirante Adalberto Nunes - Archery
- Copacabana Beach - Triathlon
- Iate Clube do Rio de Janeiro - Sailing

=== Rezende ===
- AMAN, Resende - Shooting

=== São Paulo ===
- Ibirapuera Gymnasium - Karate
- Sambodromo do Anhembi - Speed Skating
- Olympic Training and Research Centre - Weightlifting and Table Tennis
- Banco do Brasil Athletic Association - Figure Skating
- Bom Retiro Stadium - Softball
- Clube Atlético Monte Líbano - Tennis
- Funstation Bowling Shopping Analia Franco - Bowling

=== Itu ===
- Lago Alpha Village - Aquatic Skiing

=== Mogi das Cruzes ===
- Paradise Golf Club, - Golf

=== São Bernardo do Campo ===
- São Bernardo do Campo Municipal Gymnasium - Handball
