= Gymnastics at the 2015 Pan American Games – Women's artistic individual all-around =

Women's artistic individual all-around at the 2015 Pan American Games
- Venue: Toronto Coliseum
- Dates: July 13
- Competitors: 54
- Winning score: 58.150

Medalists
Gold medal	Ellie Black	Canada
Silver medal	Madison Desch	United States
Bronze medal	Flávia Saraiva	Brazil

The women's artistic individual all-around gymnastic event at the 2015 Pan American Games was held on July 13 at the Toronto Coliseum.

== Schedule ==
All times are Eastern Standard Time (UTC-3).

Date	Time	Round
July 12, 2015	10:45	Qualification
July 12, 2015	14:45	Qualification
July 12, 2015	19:00	Qualification
July 13, 2015	18:50	Final

== Results ==
=== Final ===
Position	Gymnast	Vault (gymnastics)	Uneven bars	Balance beam	Floor (gymnastics)	Total
1st place, gold medalist(s)	Ellie Black (CAN)	14.550	14.300	14.950	14.350	58.150
2nd place, silver medalist(s)	Madison Desch (USA)	14.850	14.500	13.950	14.150	57.450
3rd place, bronze medalist(s)	Flávia Saraiva (BRA)	14.200	13.800	14.400	14.650	57.050
4	Amelia Hundley (USA)	15.000	12.900	14.100	14.100	56.100
5	Daniele Hypólito (BRA)	14.100	13.150	14.050	13.950	55.250
6	Isabela Onyshko (CAN)	13.950	13.200	14.000	13.900	55.050
7	Ana Sofía Gómez (GUA)	14.650	11.800	14.400	13.450	54.300
8	Ana Lago (MEX)	14.050	13.500	13.050	13.250	53.850
9	Marcia Videaux (CUB)	14.700	13.500	11.600	13.250	53.050
10	Yurany Avendaño (COL)	13.550	13.250	12.750	12.700	52.250
11	Ginna Escobar (COL)	13.800	12.700	13.00	12.650	52.150
12	Ailen Valente (ARG)	13.650	13.200	12.800	12.400	52.050
13	Ariana Orrego Martinez (PER)	13.850	12.800	12.250	13.100	52.000
14	Marisa Dick (TTO)	13.450	12.400	12.800	12.600	51.250
15	Ayelén Tarabini (ARG)	13.150	12.400	13.300	11.300	50.150
16	Leidys Rojas (CUB)	11.200	12.700	13.250	12.950	50.100
17	Katriel De Sousa (VEN)	13.600	10.900	11.550	13.000	49.050
18	Isabella Amado Medrano (PAN)	13.650	10.950	11.750	12.150	48.500
19	Paula Mejias (PUR)	13.500	11.650	10.150	13.000	48.300
20	Elid Hellwing Burgos (ECU)	12.200	11.350	12.050	12.350	47.950
21	Debora Reis Puyesky (URU)	12.250	11.000	11.450	10.100	44.800
22	Sydney Mason (BER)	12.500	9.600	10.200	11.750	44.050
23	Morgan Lloyd (CAY)	11.550	8.750	10.550	10.300	41.150
24	Ivet Rojas Galean (VEN)			12.600		12.600

=== Qualification ===
Megan Skaggs of the United States and Lorrane Oliveira of Brazil finished in 5th and 12th respectively, but did they not progress to the final due to the fact that only two athletes per country can qualify for finals.

Position	Gymnast	Vault (gymnastics)	Uneven bars	Balance beam	Floor (gymnastics)	Total	Notes
1	Amelia Hundley (USA)	15.100	14.500	13.750	14.300	57.650	Q
2	Madison Desch (USA)	14.950	14.450	13.250	14.650	57.300	Q
3	Ana Sofía Gómez (GUA)	14.600	14.250	14.350	14.000	57.200	Q
4	Flávia Saraiva (BRA)	14.150	13.450	14.550	14.200	56.350	Q
5	Megan Skaggs (USA)	14.900	13.750	14.050	13.400	56.100	
6	Ellie Black (CAN)	14.400	12.950	14.100	14.200	55.650	Q
7	Isabela Onyshko (CAN)	14.100	14.300	13.450	13.600	55.450	Q
8	Daniele Hypólito (BRA)	14.300	13.050	13.300	14.150	54.800	Q
9	Ana Lago (MEX)	14.300	13.150	12.750	13.150	53.350	Q
10	Leidys Rojas (CUB)	14.200	13.050	12.450	12.750	52.450	Q
11	Marcia Videaux (CUB)	14.850	13.350	12.950	11.150	52.300	Q
12	Lorrane Oliveira (BRA)	14.750	12.900	12.100	12.050	51.800	
13	Ayelen Tarabini (ARG)	13.300	12.300	12.200	13.800	51.600	Q
14	Isabella Amado Medrano (PAN)	14.050	11.850	13.350	13.200	51.450	Q
15	Yurany Avendaño (COL)	13.700	12.000	12.450	13.300	51.450	Q
16	Ginna Escobar (COL)	13.800	12.800	12.450	12.400	51.450	Q
17	Ivet Rojas Galean (VEN)	14.000	12.100	12.100	13.00	51.200	Q
18	Ariana Orrego Martinez (PER)	13.850	12.700	12.150	12.400	51.100	Q
19	Ailen Valente (ARG)	13.750	12.000	11.750	13.150	50.650	Q
20	Marisa Dick (TTO)	13.500	12.450	12.550	12.000	50.500	Q
21	Makarena Pinto (CHI)	13.850	11.250	11.650	12.250	49.000	Q
22	Katriel De Sousa (VEN)	13.650	11.050	11.050	12.800	48.550	Q
23	Yamilet Peña (DOM)	15.100	10.900	10.150	12.300	48.450	Q
24	Paula Mejias (PUR)	14.900	8.550	10.400	13.950	47.800	Q
25	Elid Hellwing Burgos (ECU)	12.300	11.350	11.550	12.500	47.700	Q
26	Debora Reis Puyesky (URU)	11.550	11.850	10.450	10.400	44.250	Q
27	Sydney Mason (BER)	12.800	9.150	10.100	11.200	43.250	R
28	Maegan Chant (CAN)	14.250		12.850	13.350	40.450	
29	Victoria-Kayen Woo (CAN)		13.400	13.500	13.400	40.300	
30	Morgan Lloyd (CAY)	11.750	7.450	10.750	10.100	40.050	R
31	Dovelis Torres (CUB)	14.300	12.450	13.150		39.900	
32	Leticia Costa (BRA)	14.150	12.450		12.850	39.450	
33	Amaranta Torres (MEX)	14.150		12.950	12.000	39.100	
34	Camila Ambrosio (ARG)	13.600	12.000	12.400		38.000	
35	Yanin Retiz (MEX)		13.200	11.800	12.900	37.900	
36	Paola Marquez (VEN)	13.400		12.700	11.600	37.700	
37	Marcela Sandoval (COL)		13.200	12.500	11.950	37.650	
38	Merlina Galera (ARG)	13.300		12.450	11.700	37.450	
39	Bibiana Velez (COL)	13.900	13.000	9.150		36.050	
40	Mary Morffi (CUB)		10.850	12.450	12.450	35.750	
41	Kianna Dean (BAH)	12.250	2.550	8.150	9.650	32.600	R
42	Rachel Gowey (USA)		14.750	14.500		29.250	
43	Emily Schild (USA)	15.050			13.750	28.800	
44	Leidys Perdomo (CUB)	14.150			13.850	28.000	
45	Jessica López (VEN)		14.300	13.400		27.700	
46	Ahtziri Sandoval (MEX)	13.900	13.800			27.700	
47	Madison Copiak (CAN)	13.800	13.800			27.600	
48	Franchesca Santi (CHI)	14.300			12.300	26.600	
49	Lizeth Ruiz (COL)	13.700			12.450	26.150	
50	Eliana Gonzalez (VEN)	13.900	11.450			25.350	
51	Elsa García (MEX)		13.600	11.700		25.300	
52	Maria Stoffel (ARG)		12.000		11.600	23.600	
53	Kaylee Cole (BOL)		12.400	10.900		23.300	
54	Julie Kim Sinmon (BRA)			13.750		13.750	

Qualification Legend: Q = Qualified to apparatus final; R = Qualified to apparatus final as reserve
