= Gymnastics at the 2015 Pan American Games – Women's artistic team all-around =

Women's artistic team all-around at the 2015 Pan American Games
- Venue: Toronto Coliseum
- Dates: July 12
- Competitors: 40 from 8 nations
- Winning score: 173.800

Medalists
Gold medal	Madison Desch; Rachel Gowey; Amelia Hundley; Emily Schild; Megan Skaggs	United States
Silver medal	Ellie Black; Maegan Chant; Madison Copiak; Isabela Onyshko; Victoria-Kayen Woo	Canada
Bronze medal	Lorrane Oliveira; Letícia Costa; Flávia Saraiva; Daniele Hypólito; Julie Sinmon	Brazil

The women's artistic team all-around gymnastic event at the 2015 Pan American Games was held on July 12 at the Toronto Coliseum. This event also acted as the qualification for the all-around and event finals.

== Schedule ==
All times are Eastern Standard Time (UTC-3).

Date	Time	Round
July 12, 2015	10:45	Subdivision 1
July 12, 2015	14:45	Subdivision 2
July 12, 2015	19:00	Subdivision 3

== Team competition ==
Rank	Country	Vault (gymnastics)	Uneven bars	Balance beam	Floor (gymnastics)	Total
1st place, gold medalist(s)	United States	45.100 (1)	43.700 (1)	42.300 (1)	42.700 (1)	173.800
1st place, gold medalist(s)	Madison Desch	14.950	14.450	13.250	14.650	173.800
1st place, gold medalist(s)	Rachel Gowey		14.750	14.500		173.800
1st place, gold medalist(s)	Amelia Hundley	15.100	14.500	13.750	14.300	173.800
1st place, gold medalist(s)	Emily Schild	15.050			13.750	173.800
1st place, gold medalist(s)	Megan Skaggs	14.900	13.750	14.050	13.400	173.800
2nd place, silver medalist(s)	Canada	42.750 (4)	41.500 (2)	41.050 (3)	41.200 (2)	166.500
2nd place, silver medalist(s)	Ellie Black	14.400	12.950	14.100	14.200	166.500
2nd place, silver medalist(s)	Maegan Chant	14.250		12.850	13.350	166.500
2nd place, silver medalist(s)	Madison Copiak	13.800	13.800			166.500
2nd place, silver medalist(s)	Isabela Onyshko	14.100	14.300	13.450	13.600	166.500
2nd place, silver medalist(s)	Victoria-Kayen Woo		13.400	13.500	13.400	166.500
3rd place, bronze medalist(s)	Brazil	43.200 (3)	39.400 (4)	41.600 (2)	41.200 (2)	165.400
3rd place, bronze medalist(s)	Lorrane Oliveira	14.750	12.900	12.100	12.050	165.400
3rd place, bronze medalist(s)	Letícia Costa	14.150	12.450		12.850	165.400
3rd place, bronze medalist(s)	Flávia Saraiva	14.150	13.450	14.550	14.200	165.400
3rd place, bronze medalist(s)	Daniele Hypólito	14.300	13.050	13.300	14.150	165.400
3rd place, bronze medalist(s)	Julie Sinmon			13.750		165.400
4	Cuba	43.350 (2)	38.850 (6)	38.550 (4)	39.050 (4)	159.800
4	Mary Morffi		10.850	12.450	12.450	159.800
4	Leidys Perdomo	14.150			13.850	159.800
4	Leidys Rojas	14.200	13.050	12.450	12.750	159.800
4	Dovélis Torres	14.300	12.450	13.150		159.800
4	Marcia Videaux	14.850	13.350	12.950	11.150	159.800
5	Mexico	42.350 (5)	40.600 (3)	37.500 (6)	38.050 (7)	158.500
5	Elsa García		13.600	11.700		158.500
5	Ana Lago	14.300	13.150	12.750	13.150	158.500
5	Yanin Retiz		13.200	11.800	12.900	158.500
5	Ahtziri Sandoval	13.900	13.800			158.500
5	Amaranta Torres	14.150		12.950	12.000	158.500
6	Colombia	41.400 (7)	39.000 (5)	37.400 (7)	38.150 (6)	155.950
6	Yurany Avendaño	13.700	12.000	12.450	13.300	155.950
6	Ginna Escobar	13.800	12.800	12.450	12.400	155.950
6	Lizeth Ruíz	13.700			12.450	155.950
6	Marcela Sandoval		13.200	12.500	11.950	155.950
6	Bibiana Vélez	13.900	13.000	9.150		155.950
7	Venezuela	41.550 (6)	37.850 (7)	38.200 (5)	37.400 (8)	155.000
7	Katriel De Sousa	13.650	11.050	11.050	12.800	155.000
7	Eliana González	13.900	11.450			155.000
7	Jessica López		14.300	13.400		155.000
7	Paola Márquez	13.400		12.700	11.600	155.000
7	Ivet Rojas	14.000	12.100	12.100	13.000	155.000
8	Argentina	40.650 (8)	36.300 (8)	37.050 (8)	38.650 (5)	152.650
8	Camila Ambrosio	13.600	12.000	12.400		152.650
8	Merlina Galera	13.300		12.450	11.700	152.650
8	Maria Stoffel		12.000		11.600	152.650
8	Ayelén Tarabini	13.300	12.300	12.200	13.800	152.650
8	Ailen Valente	13.750	12.000	11.750	13.150	152.650

== Qualification results ==
=== Individual all-around ===
Megan Skaggs of the United States and Lorrane Oliveira of Brazil finished in 5th and 12th respectively, but did they not progress to the final because only two athletes per country can qualify for finals.

Position	Gymnast	Vault (gymnastics)	Uneven bars	Balance beam	Floor (gymnastics)	Total	Notes
1	Amelia Hundley (USA)	15.100	14.500	13.750	14.300	57.650	Q
2	Madison Desch (USA)	14.950	14.450	13.250	14.650	57.300	Q
3	Ana Sofía Gómez (GUA)	14.600	14.250	14.350	14.000	57.200	Q
4	Flávia Saraiva (BRA)	14.150	13.450	14.550	14.200	56.350	Q
5	Megan Skaggs (USA)	14.900	13.750	14.050	13.400	56.100	
6	Ellie Black (CAN)	14.400	12.950	14.100	14.200	55.650	Q
7	Isabela Onyshko (CAN)	14.100	14.300	13.450	13.600	55.450	Q
8	Daniele Hypólito (BRA)	14.300	13.050	13.300	14.150	54.800	Q
9	Ana Lago (MEX)	14.300	13.150	12.750	13.150	53.350	Q
10	Leidys Rojas (CUB)	14.200	13.050	12.450	12.750	52.450	Q
11	Marcia Videaux (CUB)	14.850	13.350	12.950	11.150	52.300	Q
12	Lorrane Oliveira (BRA)	14.750	12.900	12.100	12.050	51.800	
13	Ayelén Tarabini (ARG)	13.300	12.300	12.200	13.800	51.600	Q
14	Isabella Amado (PAN)	14.050	11.850	13.350	13.200	51.450	Q
15	Yurany Avendaño (COL)	13.700	12.000	12.450	13.300	51.450	Q
16	Ginna Escobar (COL)	13.800	12.800	12.450	12.400	51.450	Q
17	Ivet Rojas (VEN)	14.000	12.100	12.100	13.00	51.200	Q
18	Ariana Orrego (PER)	13.850	12.700	12.150	12.400	51.100	Q
19	Ailen Valente (ARG)	13.750	12.000	11.750	13.150	50.650	Q
20	Marisa Dick (TTO)	13.500	12.450	12.550	12.000	50.500	Q
21	Makarena Pinto (CHI)	13.850	11.250	11.650	12.250	49.000	Q
22	Katriel De Sousa (VEN)	13.650	11.050	11.050	12.800	48.550	Q
23	Yamilet Peña (DOM)	15.100	10.900	10.150	12.300	48.450	Q
24	Paula Mejías (PUR)	14.900	8.550	10.400	13.950	47.800	Q
25	Elid Hellwing (ECU)	12.300	11.350	11.550	12.500	47.700	Q
26	Debora Reis (URU)	11.550	11.850	10.450	10.400	44.250	Q
27	Sydney Mason (BER)	12.800	9.150	10.100	11.200	43.250	R
28	Maegan Chant (CAN)	14.250		12.850	13.350	40.450	
29	Victoria-Kayen Woo (CAN)		13.400	13.500	13.400	40.300	
30	Morgan Lloyd (CAY)	11.750	7.450	10.750	10.100	40.050	R
31	Dovélis Torres (CUB)	14.300	12.450	13.150		39.900	
32	Letícia Costa (BRA)	14.150	12.450		12.850	39.450	
33	Amaranta Torres (MEX)	14.150		12.950	12.000	39.100	
34	Camila Ambrosio (ARG)	13.600	12.000	12.400		38.000	
35	Yanin Retiz (MEX)		13.200	11.800	12.900	37.900	
36	Paola Márquez (VEN)	13.400		12.700	11.600	37.700	
37	Marcela Sandoval (COL)		13.200	12.500	11.950	37.650	
38	Merlina Galera (ARG)	13.300		12.450	11.700	37.450	
39	Bibiana Vélez (COL)	13.900	13.000	9.150		36.050	
40	Mary Morffi (CUB)		10.850	12.450	12.450	35.750	
41	Kianna Dean (BAH)	12.250	2.550	8.150	9.650	32.600	R
42	Rachel Gowey (USA)		14.750	14.500		29.250	
43	Emily Schild (USA)	15.050			13.750	28.800	
44	Leidys Perdomo (CUB)	14.150			13.850	28.000	
45	Jessica López (VEN)		14.300	13.400		27.700	
46	Ahtziri Sandoval (MEX)	13.900	13.800			27.700	
47	Madison Copiak (CAN)	13.800	13.800			27.600	
48	Franchesca Santi (CHI)	14.300			12.300	26.600	
49	Lizeth Ruíz (COL)	13.700			12.450	26.150	
50	Eliana González (VEN)	13.900	11.450			25.350	
51	Elsa García (MEX)		13.600	11.700		25.300	
52	Maria Stoffel (ARG)		12.000		11.600	23.600	
53	Kaylee Cole (BOL)		12.400	10.900		23.300	
54	Julie Sinmon (BRA)			13.750		13.750	

=== Vault ===
Position	Gymnast	Score 1	Score 2	Total	Notes
1	Marcia Videaux (CUB)	14.850	15.050	14.950	Q
2	Paula Mejías (PUR)	14.900	14.600	14.750	Q
3	Yamilet Peña (DOM)	15.100	13.900	14.500	Q
4	Ellie Black (CAN)	14.400	14.100	14.250	Q
5	Maegan Chant (CAN)	14.250	14.050	14.150	Q
6	Franchesca Santi (CHI)	14.300	13.750	14.025	Q
7	Daniele Hypólito (BRA)	14.300	13.600	13.950	Q
8	Makarena Pinto (CHI)	13.850	14.000	13.925	Q
9	Isabella Amado (PAN)	14.050	13.500	13.775	R
10	Dovélis Torres (CUB)	14.300	12.900	13.600	R
11	Ariana Orrego (PER)	13.850	13.300	13.575	R

=== Uneven bars ===
Madison Desch and Megan Skaggs of the United States finished in 4th and 9th respectively, but did they not progress to the final because only two athletes per country can qualify for finals.

Position	Gymnast	Uneven bars	Notes
1	Rachel Gowey (USA)	14.750	Q
2	Amelia Hundley (USA)	14.500	Q
3	Jessica López (VEN)	14.300	Q
4	Isabela Onyshko (CAN)	14.300	Q
5	Ana Sofía Gómez (GUA)	14.250	Q
6	Madison Copiak (CAN)	13.800	Q
7	Ahtziri Sandoval (MEX)	13.800	Q
8	Elsa García (MEX)	13.600	Q
9	Flávia Saraiva (BRA)	13.400	R
10	Marcia Videaux (CUB)	13.350	R
11	Marcela Sandoval (COL)	13.200	R

=== Balance beam ===
Amelia Hundley of the United States finished in 7th and Isabela Onyshko of Canada finished in 9th but did they not progress to the final because only two athletes per country can qualify for finals.

Position	Gymnast	Balance beam	Notes
1	Flávia Saraiva (BRA)	14.550	Q
2	Rachel Gowey (USA)	14.500	Q
3	Ana Sofía Gómez (GUA)	14.350	Q
4	Ellie Black (CAN)	14.100	Q
5	Megan Skaggs (USA)	14.050	Q
6	Julie Sinmon (BRA)	13.750	Q
7	Victoria-Kayen Woo (CAN)	13.500	Q
8	Jessica López (VEN)	13.400	Q
9	Dovélis Torres (CUB)	13.150	R
10	Marcia Videaux (CUB)	12.950	R
11	Amaranta Torres (MEX)	12.950	R

=== Floor ===
Position	Gymnast	Floor (gymnastics)	Notes
1	Madison Desch (USA)	14.650	Q
2	Amelia Hundley (USA)	14.300	Q
3	Flávia Saraiva (BRA)	14.200	Q
4	Ellie Black (CAN)	14.200	Q
5	Daniele Hypólito (BRA)	14.150	Q
6	Ana Sofía Gómez (GUA)	14.000	Q
7	Paula Mejías (PUR)	13.950	Q
8	Leidys Perdomo (CUB)	13.850	Q
9	Ayelén Tarabini (ARG)	13.800	R
10	Isabela Onyshko (CAN)	13.600	R
11	Yurany Avendaño (COL)	13.300	R
