= 2015 FIG Artistic Gymnastics World Cup series =

International gymnastics competition series

FIG Artistic Gymnastics World Cup series
- Location: various — see locations
- Date: March 7 – September 20, 2015 see schedule

The 2015 FIG Artistic Gymnastics World Cup series was a series of stages where events in men's and women's artistic gymnastics were contested.

== World Cup stages ==
Date	Event	Location	Type
7 March	American Cup	Dallas, United States	C II – All Around
19–22 March	Turnier der Meister World Challenge Cup	Cottbus, Germany	C III – Apparatus
25–27 March	Doha World Challenge Cup	Doha, Qatar	C III – Apparatus
3–5 April	Ljubljana World Challenge Cup	Ljubljana, Slovenia	C III – Apparatus
1–3 May	São Paulo World Challenge Cup	São Paulo, Brazil	C III – Apparatus
7–9 May	Varna World Challenge Cup	Varna, Bulgaria	C III – Apparatus
21–24 May	Anadia World Challenge Cup	Anadia, Portugal	C III – Apparatus
17–20 September	Osijek World Challenge Cup	Osijek, Croatia	C III – Apparatus

== Medalists ==
=== Men ===
Competition	Event	Gold	Silver	Bronze
(United States) Dallas	All-around	(Ukraine) Oleg Verniaiev	(Japan) Ryohei Kato	(United States) Donnell Whittenburg
(Germany) Cottbus	Floor exercise	(Japan) Kenzo Shirai	(Germany) Matthias Fahrig	(Netherlands) Bart Deurloo
(Germany) Cottbus	Pommel horse	(Ukraine) Oleg Verniaiev	(Belgium) Donna-Donny Truyens	(France) Cyril Tommasone
(Germany) Cottbus	Rings	(Brazil) Arthur Zanetti	(Greece) Eleftherios Petrounias	(Turkey) İbrahim Çolak
(Germany) Cottbus	Vault	(Japan) Kenzo Shirai	(Ukraine) Oleg Verniaiev	(Japan) Koji Yamamuro
(Germany) Cottbus	Parallel bars	(Ukraine) Oleg Verniaiev	(Colombia) Jossimar Calvo	(Netherlands) Epke Zonderland
(Germany) Cottbus	Horizontal bar	(Turkey) Ümit Şamiloğlu (Switzerland) Pablo Braegger	—N/a	(Spain) Néstor Abad
(Qatar) Doha	Floor exercise	(United States) Jacob Dalton	(Brazil) Diego Hypólito	(Japan) Shotaro Shirai
(Qatar) Doha	Pommel horse	(Armenia) Harutyun Merdinyan	(Croatia) Matija Baron	(Armenia) Artur Davtyan
(Qatar) Doha	Rings	(Brazil) Arthur Zanetti	(Armenia) Artur Tovmasyan	(Romania) Andrei Muntean
(Qatar) Doha	Vault	(Armenia) Artur Davtyan	(Brazil) Diego Hypólito	(Latvia) Vitalijs Kardasovs
(Qatar) Doha	Parallel bars	(Azerbaijan) Oleg Stepko	(Colombia) Jossimar Calvo	(Romania) Andrei Muntean
(Qatar) Doha	Horizontal bar	(Argentina) Nicolás Córdoba	(Japan) Kazuyuki Takeda	(United States) Danell Leyva
(Slovenia) Ljubljana	Floor exercise	(Netherlands) Bart Deurloo	(Finland) Oskar Kirmes	(China) Wu Di
(Slovenia) Ljubljana	Pommel horse	(Ukraine) Oleg Verniaiev	(Croatia) Filip Ude	(Italy) Alberto Busnari
(Slovenia) Ljubljana	Rings	(China) Wu Guanhua	(Italy) Matteo Morandi (France) Samir Aït Saïd	—N/a
(Slovenia) Ljubljana	Vault	(Switzerland) Marco Rizzo	(Netherlands) Bart Deurloo	(Latvia) Vitalijs Kardasovs
(Slovenia) Ljubljana	Parallel bars	(Colombia) Jossimar Calvo	(France) Axel Augis	(Belarus) Vasili Mikhalitsyn
(Slovenia) Ljubljana	Horizontal bar	(Netherlands) Epke Zonderland	(Argentina) Nicolás Córdoba	(Netherlands) Bart Deurloo
(Brazil) São Paulo	Floor exercise	(Chile) Tomás González	(Brazil) Diego Hypólito	(Germany) Matthias Fahrig
(Brazil) São Paulo	Pommel horse	(China) Xiao Ruoteng	(China) Zhang Hongtao	(Germany) Andreas Toba
(Brazil) São Paulo	Rings	(Brazil) Arthur Zanetti	(Brazil) Henrique Flores	(Argentina) Federico Molinari
(Brazil) São Paulo	Vault	(Brazil) Ângelo Assumpção	(Germany) Matthias Fahrig	(Brazil) Diego Hypólito
(Brazil) São Paulo	Parallel bars	(Germany) Lukas Dauser	(China) Zhu Xiaodong	(Brazil) Francisco Barretto
(Brazil) São Paulo	Horizontal bar	(China) Xiao Ruoteng	(Argentina) Nicolás Córdoba	(Dominican Republic) Audris Nin Reyes
(Bulgaria) Varna	Floor exercise	(Croatia) Tomislav Markovic	(United Kingdom) James Hall	(Slovenia) Ziga Silc
(Bulgaria) Varna	Pommel horse	(France) Cyril Tommasone	(Azerbaijan) Oleg Stepko	(Latvia) Dmitrijs Trefilovs
(Bulgaria) Varna	Rings	(France) Danny Rodrigues	(Kazakhstan) Azizbek Kudratullayev (Turkey) İbrahim Çolak	—N/a
(Bulgaria) Varna	Vault	(Belarus) Pavel Bulauski	(Azerbaijan) Oleg Stepko	(Vietnam) Thanh Tung Le
(Bulgaria) Varna	Parallel bars	(Azerbaijan) Oleg Stepko	(Turkey) Ferhat Arıcan	(Turkey) Ahmet Önder
(Bulgaria) Varna	Horizontal bar	(Argentina) Nicolás Córdoba	(Bulgaria) Aleksandar Batinkov	(United Kingdom) James Hall
(Portugal) Anadia	Floor exercise	(Cuba) Manrique Larduet	(Slovenia) Ziga Silc	(Brazil) Caio Souza
(Portugal) Anadia	Pommel horse	(Colombia) Jossimar Calvo	(Latvia) Dmitrijs Trefilovs	(France) Cyril Tommasone
(Portugal) Anadia	Rings	(Argentina) Federico Molinari	(Cuba) Manrique Larduet	(Puerto Rico) Tommy Ramos
(Portugal) Anadia	Vault	(Cuba) Manrique Larduet	(United Kingdom) Dominick Cunningham	(Latvia) Vitalijs Kardasovs
(Portugal) Anadia	Parallel bars	(Colombia) Jossimar Calvo	(Cuba) Manrique Larduet	(United Kingdom) Ashley Watson
(Portugal) Anadia	Horizontal bar	(Cuba) Manrique Larduet	(Brazil) Francisco Barretto	(Cuba) Randy Lerú
(Croatia) Osijek	Floor exercise	(Israel) Artem Dolgopyat	(Slovenia) Ziga Silc	(Mexico) Daniel Corral
(Croatia) Osijek	Pommel horse	(United Kingdom) Louis Smith	(Croatia) Robert Seligman	(Ukraine) Andrii Sienichkin
(Croatia) Osijek	Rings	(Brazil) Arthur Zanetti	(Ukraine) Igor Radivilov	(United Kingdom) Courtney Tulloch
(Croatia) Osijek	Vault	(Ukraine) Igor Radivilov	(Japan) Wataru Tanigawa	(Finland) Tomi Tuuha
(Croatia) Osijek	Parallel bars	(Ukraine) Oleg Verniaiev	(Turkey) Ferhat Arıcan	(Japan) Hidetaka Miyachi
(Croatia) Osijek	Horizontal bar	(Brazil) Arthur Mariano	(Argentina) Nicolás Córdoba	(Brazil) Caio Souza

=== Women ===
Competition	Event	Gold	Silver	Bronze
(United States) Dallas	All-Around	(United States) Simone Biles	(United States) Mykayla Skinner	(Italy) Erika Fasana
(Germany) Cottbus	Vault	(Uzbekistan) Oksana Chusovitina	(Slovenia) Tjaša Kysselef	(Slovenia) Teja Belak
(Germany) Cottbus	Uneven Bars	(Sweden) Jonna Adlerteg	(Azerbaijan) Kristina Pravdina	(Portugal) Ana Filipa Martins
(Germany) Cottbus	Balance Beam	(Romania) Andreea Munteanu	(Germany) Kim Janas	(Spain) Ana Pérez
(Germany) Cottbus	Floor Exercise	(Poland) Marta Pihan-Kulesza	(Romania) Andreea Munteanu	(Portugal) Ana Filipa Martins
(Qatar) Doha	Vault	(Switzerland) Giulia Steingruber	(Vietnam) Phan Thị Hà Thanh	(Slovenia) Teja Belak
(Qatar) Doha	Uneven Bars	(France) Youna Dufournet	(Romania) Diana Bulimar	(Switzerland) Jessica Diacci
(Qatar) Doha	Balance Beam	(Vietnam) Phan Thị Hà Thanh	(Switzerland) Giulia Steingruber	(Romania) Diana Bulimar
(Qatar) Doha	Floor Exercise	(Switzerland) Giulia Steingruber	(Romania) Laura Jurca	(Switzerland) Ilaria Käslin
(Slovenia) Ljubljana	Vault	(Uzbekistan) Oksana Chusovitina	(Slovenia) Teja Belak	(Netherlands) Noël van Klaveren
(Slovenia) Ljubljana	Uneven Bars	(Canada) Isabela Onyshko	(Sweden) Jonna Adlerteg	(Brazil) Rebeca Andrade
(Slovenia) Ljubljana	Balance Beam	(Canada) Isabela Onyshko	(Brazil) Lorrane Oliveira	(Brazil) Julie Kim Sinmon
(Slovenia) Ljubljana	Floor Exercise	(Netherlands) Eythora Thorsdottir	(Canada) Isabela Onyshko	(Argentina) Ayelén Tarabini
(Brazil) São Paulo	Vault	(China) Deng Yalan	(Brazil) Rebeca Andrade	(Chile) Franchesca Santi
(Brazil) São Paulo	Uneven Bars	(China) Shang Chunsong	(Germany) Sophie Scheder	(Germany) Elisabeth Seitz
(Brazil) São Paulo	Balance Beam	(China) Shang Chunsong	(Brazil) Flávia Saraiva	(Germany) Sophie Scheder
(Brazil) São Paulo	Floor Exercise	(Brazil) Flávia Saraiva	(Germany) Elisabeth Seitz	(Germany) Leah Griesser
(Bulgaria) Varna	Vault	(Uzbekistan) Oksana Chusovitina	(Slovenia) Teja Belak	(Switzerland) Giulia Steingruber
(Bulgaria) Varna	Uneven Bars	(North Korea) Kang Yong-mi	(France) Youna Dufournet	(Switzerland) Giulia Steingruber
(Bulgaria) Varna	Balance Beam	(Vietnam) Phan Thị Hà Thanh	(North Korea) Kim Un-hyang	(Switzerland) Ilaria Käslin
(Bulgaria) Varna	Floor Exercise	(Switzerland) Ilaria Käslin	(Panama) Isabella Amado	(Peru) Mariana Chiarella
(Portugal) Anadia	Vault	(Cuba) Marcia Videaux	(Mexico) Alexa Moreno	(Chile) Makarena Pinto
(Portugal) Anadia	Uneven Bars	(Venezuela) Jessica López	(Portugal) Ana Filipa Martins	(Cuba) Marcia Videaux
(Portugal) Anadia	Balance Beam	(Sweden) Emma Larsson	(Argentina) Ayelén Tarabini	(Israel) Tzuf Feldon (New Zealand) Charlotte Sullivan
(Portugal) Anadia	Floor Exercise	(Hungary) Dorina Böczögő	(Argentina) Ayelén Tarabini	(Slovenia) Saša Golob
(Croatia) Osijek	Vault	(Puerto Rico) Paula Mejias	(Hungary) Boglárka Dévai	(Chile) Franchesca Santi
(Croatia) Osijek	Uneven Bars	(United Kingdom) Ruby Harrold	(Finland) Annika Urvikko	(Brazil) Thauany Araújo
(Croatia) Osijek	Balance Beam	(Brazil) Jade Barbosa	(Hungary) Dorina Böczögő	(Panama) Isabella Amado
(Croatia) Osijek	Floor Exercise	(Puerto Rico) Paula Mejias	(Hungary) Tünde Csillag (Cuba) Marcia Videaux	—N/a

== See also ==
- 2015 FIG Rhythmic Gymnastics World Cup series
