= 2015 São Paulo World Cup =

Gymnastics competition

2015 São Paulo World Challenge Cup
- Venue: Geraldo José de Almeida Gym
- Location: São Paulo, Brazil
- Start date: 1 May 2015
- End date: 3 May 2015

The 2015 São Paulo World Challenge Cup was a gymnastics competition held in the southeastern city of São Paulo, one of the largest cities in Brazil. It was held in the Geraldo José de Almeida Gym from May 1 to May 3, 2015.

== Schedule ==
Tuesday, 28 April 2015

- Arrival of the Delegations
- 14:30 – 19:30 Official training

Wednesday, 29 April 2015

- 9:00 – 11:30 Official training
- 14:30 – 19:30 Official training

Thursday, 30 April 2015

- 9:00 – 11:30 Official training
- 14:30 – 19:30 Official training
- 21:00 – Technical Meeting (Bourbon Ibirapuera Hotel)

Friday, 1 May 2015

- 9:00 – 11:30 Official training
- 13:00 – Judges’ instruction (Bourbon Ibirapuera Hotel)
- 14:00 – 15:55 Warm-up
- 16:00 – 20:00 Qualifications I MAG & WAG

Saturday, 2 May 2015

- 8:00 – Judges’ instruction (Bourbon Ibirapuera Hotel)
- 8:30 – 9:55 Warm-up
- 12:00 – Qualifications II MAG & WAG
- 15:55 – Warm-up
- 18:00 – Final I MAG & WAG (5 apparatus)

Sunday, 3 May 2015

- 8:00 – Judges’ instruction (Bourbon Ibirapuera Hotel)
- 8:30 – 9:55 Warm-up
- 10:00 – 12:00 Final II MAG & WAG (5 apparatus)
- Final banquet

Monday, 4 May 2015

- Departure of Delegations

== Medal winners ==
Event	Gold	Silver	Bronze
Men
Women
Vault	Deng Yalan (CHN)	Rebeca Andrade (BRA)	Franchesca Santi (CHI)
Uneven Bars	Shang Chunsong (CHN)	Sophie Scheder (GER)	Elisabeth Seitz (GER)
Balance Beam	Shang Chunsong (CHN)	Flávia Saraiva (BRA)	Sophie Scheder (GER)
Floor Exercise	Flávia Saraiva (BRA)	Elisabeth Seitz (GER)	Leah Greisser (GER)

== Qualification results ==
=== Women's results ===
Team	Vault (gymnastics)		Uneven bars		Balance beam		Floor (gymnastics)	
Team	Score	Rank	Score	Rank	Score	Rank	Score	Rank
Ayelen Tarabini (ARG)	13.700	8			12.900	4	13.700	3
Maria Stoffel (ARG)			12.800	9				
Ailen Valente (ARG)			12.450	11			12.550	8
Paloma Guerrero (ARG)					12.350	6		
Rebeca Andrade (BRA)	14.825	1	12.900	8				
Flávia Saraiva (BRA)			13.550	4	13.700	2	13.900	1
Leticia Costa (BRA)	13.975	4						
Lorrane Dos Santos (BRA)					12.000	10	13.750	2
Franchesca Santi (CHI)	13.950	5					12.400	9
Makarena Pinto (CHI)	0.000	12						
Simona Castro (CHI)			12.650	10	11.500	11	11.950	11
Melany Cabrera (CHI)			11.950	12	12.050	9		
Deng Yalan (CHN)	14.550	2						
Shang Chunsong (CHN)			14.200	3	15.100	1	11.400	13
Tan Jiaxin (CHN)								
Chen Siyi (CHN)			13.050	7	12.300	7	12.600	7
Yamilet Peña (DOM)			11.300	13	10.900	13	11.750	12
Leah Greisser (GER)	13.325	10					13.350	4
Sophie Scheder (GER)			14.600	2	13.400	3		
Elisabeth Seitz (GER)			14.800	1	11.300	12	12.700	6
Wong Hiu Ying Angel (HKG)	13.850	6			12.200	8		
Choi Nim Yan (HKG)	13.300	11			10.750	14		
Valerija Grisane (LAT)	13.600	9					12.800	5
Sabine Gosa (LAT)			11.100	13	7.050	16		
Ana Lago (MEX)	14.000	3			12.700	5		
Ahtziri Sandoval Perez (MEX)	13.850	6	13.150	6				
Elsa García (MEX)			13.450	5			12.350	10
Mariana Vasquez (MEX)					9.450	15	9.750	14

== Final's results ==
=== Women's results ===
==== Vault ====
Rank	Gymnast	D Score	E Score	Pen.	Score 1	D Score	E Score	Pen.	Score 2	Total
1st place, gold medalist(s)	Deng Yalan (CHN)	6.000	8.975		14.975	6.200	8.750		14.950	14.962
2nd place, silver medalist(s)	Rebeca Andrade (BRA)	5.800	9.275		15.075	5.200	9.125		14.325	14.700
3rd place, bronze medalist(s)	Franchesca Santi (CHI)	5.800	8.925		14.725	4.800	8.800		13.600	14.162
4	Leticia Costa (BRA)	5.800	9.000	0.1	14.700	4.600	9.000		13.600	14.150
5	Ayelen Tarabini (ARG)	4.900	8.975		13.875	5.000	9.050		14.050	13.962
6	Ahtziri Sandoval Perez (MEX)	5.500	8.625		14.125	5.300	8.475		13.775	13.950
7	Ana Lago (MEX)	5.000	9.025		14.025	4.800	8.900		13.700	13.862
8	Wong Hiu Ying Angel (HKG)	5.200	8.675		13.875	5.000	8.550	0.1	13.450	13.662
Rank	Gymnast	Vault 1				Vault 2				Total

==== Uneven Bars ====
Position	Gymnast	D Score	E Score	Penalty	Total
1st place, gold medalist(s)	Shang Chunsong (CHN)	6.700	8.325		15.025
2nd place, silver medalist(s)	Sophie Scheder (GER)	6.400	8.475		14.875
3rd place, bronze medalist(s)	Elisabeth Seitz (GER)	6.400	8.300		14.700
4	Elsa García (MEX)	6.000	8.525		14.525
5	Chen Siyi (CHN)	6.100	8.100		14.200
6	Ahtziri Sandoval Perez (MEX)	5.900	7.775		13.675
7	Rebeca Andrade (BRA)	5.900	7.400		13.300
8	Flávia Saraiva (BRA)	5.300	7.225		12.525

==== Balance Beam ====
Position	Gymnast	D Score	E Score	Penalty	Total
1st place, gold medalist(s)	Shang Chunsong (CHN)	6.700	8.700		15.400
2nd place, silver medalist(s)	Flávia Saraiva (BRA)	6.500	8.600		15.100
3rd place, bronze medalist(s)	Sophie Scheder (GER)	5.500	8.500		14.000
4	Chen Siyi (CHN)	5.900	7.825		13.725
5	Ayelen Tarabini (ARG)	5.600	6.975		12.575
6	Wong Hiu Ying Angel (HKG)	4.600	7.300		11.900
7	Ana Lago (MEX)	5.800	5.650		11.450
8	Paloma Guerrero (ARG)	5.200	5.650		10.850

==== Floor Exercise ====
Position	Gymnast	D Score	E Score	Penalty	Total
1st place, gold medalist(s)	Flávia Saraiva (BRA)	5.700	8.225	0.3	13.625
2nd place, silver medalist(s)	Elisabeth Seitz (GER)	5.300	8.100		13.400
3rd place, bronze medalist(s)	Leah Griesser (GER)	5.200	8.125		13.325
4	Valerija Grisane (LAT)	5.100	7.975		13.075
5	Chen Siyi (CHN)	5.400	7.650		13.050
6	Ailen Valente (ARG)	5.000	7.900		12.900
7	Ayelen Tarabini (ARG)	5.400	7.325		12.725
8	Lorrane Dos Santos (BRA)	5.700	7.000	0.3	12.400
