= 2013 South American Artistic Gymnastics Championships =

International artistic gymnastics competition

The 2013 South American Artistic Gymnastics Championships were held in Santiago, Chile, December 2–8, 2013. This was the 12th edition of the South American Artistic Gymnastics Championships for senior gymnasts. The competition was initially scheduled for August, and was approved by the International Gymnastics Federation.

== Participating nations ==
- Argentina
- Bolivia
- Brazil
- Chile
- Colombia
- Ecuador
- Panama
- Peru
- Uruguay

== Medalists ==
Event	Gold	Silver	Bronze
Men
Team all-around	Colombia; Jossimar Calvo; Jorge Giraldo; Jorge Peña; William Calle; Carlos Calvo; Jhonny Calle	Brazil; Fellipe Arakawa; Petrix Barbosa; Lucas Bitencourt; Henrique Flores; Victor Rosa; Leonardo Souza	Chile; Tomás González; Felipe Piña; Juan Raffo; Juan Pablo Gonzalez; Joel Alvarez; Christian Decidet
Individual all-around	Jossimar Calvo (COL)	Tomás González (CHI)	Jorge Giraldo (COL)
Floor	Tomás González (CHI)	Jossimar Calvo (COL)	Victor Rosa (BRA)
Pommel horse	Jorge Giraldo (COL)	Lucas Bitencourt (BRA)	Juan Raffo (CHI)
Rings	Federico Molinari (ARG)	Henrique Flores (BRA)	Juan Raffo (CHI)
Vault	Tomás González (CHI)	Juan Pablo González (CHI)	Christian Meneses (URU)
Parallel bars	Jossimar Calvo (COL)	Tomás González (CHI)	Petrix Barbosa (BRA)
Horizontal bar	Jossimar Calvo (COL)	Osvaldo Martinez (ARG)	Federico Molinari (ARG)
Women
Team all-around	Brazil; Leticia Costa; Isabelle Cruz; Juliana Santos; Mariana Valentin; Rebecca Avelino	Argentina; Merlina Galera; Camila Ambrosio; Camila Klesa; Natalia Calcagno; Ailen Valente; Paloma Guerrero	Colombia; Ginna Escobar; Marcela Sandoval; Bibiana Vélez; Lizeth Ruiz
Individual all-around	Sandra Collantes (PER)	Leticia Costa (BRA)	Simona Castro (CHI)
Vault	Isabelle Cruz (BRA)	Leticia Costa (BRA)	Martina Castro (CHI)
Uneven bars	Leticia Costa (BRA)	Juliana Santos (BRA)	Merlina Galera (ARG)
Balance beam	Juliana Santos (BRA)	Isabella Amado (PAN)	Ginna Escobar (COL)
Floor	Mariana Valentin (BRA)	Paloma Guerrero (ARG)	Leticia Costa (BRA); Camila Ambrosio (ARG)

== Medal table ==
Rank	Nation	Gold	Silver	Bronze	Total
1	Brazil (BRA)	5	6	3	14
2	Colombia (COL)	5	1	3	9
3	Chile (CHI)	2	3	5	10
4	Argentina (ARG)	1	3	3	7
5	Peru (PER)	1	0	0	1
6	Panama (PAN)	0	1	0	1
7	Uruguay (URU)	0	0	1	1
Totals (7 entries)		14	14	15	43
