= Gymnastics at the 2014 Pan American Sports Festival =

Gymnastics at the 2014 Pan American Sports Festival was held at Polideportivo López Mateos in Guadalajara, Mexico from July 17 to 27, 2014.

== Medalists ==
=== Men's artistic ===
Event	Gold	Silver	Bronze
Individual all-around	Manrique Larduet; Cuba	Henrique Flores; Brazil	Jorge Giraldo; Colombia
Floor	Tomás González; Chile	Manrique Larduet; Cuba	Kevin Cerda; Mexico
Pommel horse	Jorge Giraldo; Colombia	Manrique Larduet; Cuba	Sean Melton; United States
Rings	Henrique Flores; Brazil	Manrique Larduet; Cuba	Sean Melton; United States
Vault	Jorge Vega; Guatemala	Manrique Larduet; Cuba	Boris Merchan; Ecuador
Parallel bars	Manrique Larduet; Cuba	Jorge Giraldo; Colombia	Sean Melton; United States
Horizontal bar	Kevin Cerda; Mexico	Sean Melton; United States Audrys Nin; Dominican Republic	—N/a

=== Women's artistic ===
Event	Gold	Silver	Bronze
Individual all-around	Yesenia Ferrera; Cuba	Ayelén Tarabini; Argentina	Ahtziri Sandoval; Mexico
Vault	Yesenia Ferrera; Cuba	Yamilet Peña; Dominican Republic	Ahtziri Sandoval; Mexico
Uneven bars	Yesenia Ferrera; Cuba	Ahtziri Sandoval; Mexico	Ayelén Tarabini; Argentina
Balance beam	Ayelén Tarabini; Argentina	Madison Copiak; Canada	Yesenia Ferrera; Cuba
Floor	Yesenia Ferrera; Cuba	Ayelén Tarabini; Argentina	Valentina Brostella; Panama

=== Rhythmic gymnastics ===
Event	Gold	Silver	Bronze
Individual all-around	Angélica Kvieczynski; Brazil	Natali Nikolova; Canada	Alejandra Vásquez; Mexico
Ball	Ronit Shamuilov; United States	Lina Dussan; Colombia	Valeska González; Chile
Club	Ronit Shamuilov; United States	Natali Nikolova; Canada	Lina Dussan; Colombia
Hoop	Lina Dussan; Colombia	Natali Nikolova; Canada	Valeska González; Chile
Ribbon	Ronit Shamuilov; United States	Natali Nikolova; Canada	Lina Dussan; Colombia

=== Trampoline ===
Event	Gold	Silver	Bronze
Men individual	José Vargas; Mexico	Hunter Brewster; United States	Lucas Adorno; Argentina
Women individual	Samantha Chavez; Mexico	Camilla Gomes; Brazil	Dakota Earnest; United States

== Detailed results ==
=== Men's artistic ===
Floor Exercise

Rank	Athlete	Nationality	Total
1st place, gold medalist(s)	Tomás González	Chile	14.767
2nd place, silver medalist(s)	Manrique Larduet	Cuba	14.734
3rd place, bronze medalist(s)	Kevin Cerda	Mexico	13.700
4	Henrique Flores	Brazil	13.567
5	Jorge Vega	Guatemala	13.400
6	Boris Merchan	Ecuador	12.967
7	Tarik Soto	Costa Rica	12.900
8	Audrys Nin	Dominican Republic	12.900

Pommel Horse

Rank	Athlete	Nationality	Total
1st place, gold medalist(s)	Jorge Giraldo	Colombia	14.470
2nd place, silver medalist(s)	Manrique Larduet	Cuba	14.000
3rd place, bronze medalist(s)	Sean Melton	United States	13.270
4	Audrys Nin	Dominican Republic	13.160
5	Carlos Rivera	Puerto Rico	12.800
6	Henrique Flores	Brazil	12.700
6	Boris Merchan	Ecuador	12.700
8	Kevin Cerda	Mexico	10.800

Still Rings

Rank	Athlete	Nationality	Total
1st place, gold medalist(s)	Henrique Flores	Brazil	15.670
2nd place, silver medalist(s)	Manrique Larduet	Cuba	15.000
3rd place, bronze medalist(s)	Sean Melton	United States	14.640
4	Jorge Vega	Guatemala	13.740
5	Jorge Giraldo	Colombia	13.700
6	Kevin Cerda	Mexico	13.540
7	Damien Cachia	Canada	13.370
8	Carlos Rivera	Puerto Rico	12.970

Vault

Rank	Athlete	Nationality	Total
1st place, gold medalist(s)	Jorge Vega	Guatemala	14.935
2nd place, silver medalist(s)	Manrique Larduet	Cuba	14.585
3rd place, bronze medalist(s)	Boris Merchan	Ecuador	14.135
4	Damien Cachia	Canada	14.100
4	Audrys Nin	Dominican Republic	14.100
6	Cristhian Meneses	Uruguay	13.950
7	Tarik Soto	Costa Rica	13.720

Parallel Bars

Rank	Athlete	Nationality	Total
1st place, gold medalist(s)	Manrique Larduet	Cuba	15.570
2nd place, silver medalist(s)	Jorge Giraldo	Colombia	15.040
2nd place, silver medalist(s)	Sean Melton	United States	14.540
4	Damien Cachia	Canada	12.600
5	Henrique Flores	Brazil	12.200
6	Audrys Nin	Dominican Republic	12.140
7	Tarik Soto	Costa Rica	12.040
8	Boris Merchan	Ecuador	11.700

Horizontal Bar

Rank	Athlete	Nationality	Total
1st place, gold medalist(s)	Kevin Cerda	Mexico	14.500
2nd place, silver medalist(s)	Sean Melton	United States	14.230
2nd place, silver medalist(s)	Audrys Nin	Dominican Republic	14.230
4	Jorge Giraldo	Colombia	14.200
5	Henrique Flores	Brazil	13.900
6	Manrique Larduet	Cuba	13.870
7	Tarik Soto	Costa Rica	13.200
8	Carlos Rivera	Puerto Rico	12.200

=== Women's artistic ===
Vault

Rank	Athlete	Nationality	Total
1st place, gold medalist(s)	Yesenia Ferrera	Cuba	14.662
2nd place, silver medalist(s)	Yamilet Peña	Dominican Republic	14.237
3rd place, bronze medalist(s)	Ahtziri Sandoval	Mexico	14.050
4	Nicolle Vázquez	Puerto Rico	14.037
5	Catalina Escobar	Colombia	13.800
6	Valentina Brostella	Panama	13.400
7	Diana Vásquez	Bolivia	13.375
8	Makarena Pinto	Chile	6.912

Uneven Bars

Rank	Athlete	Nationality	Total
1st place, gold medalist(s)	Yesenia Ferrera	Cuba	13.475
2nd place, silver medalist(s)	Ahtziri Sandoval	Mexico	13.000
3rd place, bronze medalist(s)	Ayelén Tarabini	Argentina	12.325
4	Yamilet Peña	Dominican Republic	10.875
5	Britany Peña	Ecuador	10.850
6	Madison Copiak	Canada	10.750
7	Catalina Escobar	Colombia	10.550
8	Makarena Pinto	Chile	8.500

Balance Beam

Rank	Athlete	Nationality	Total
1st place, gold medalist(s)	Ayelén Tarabini	Argentina	13.000
2nd place, silver medalist(s)	Madison Copiak	Canada	12.975
3rd place, bronze medalist(s)	Yesenia Ferrera	Cuba	12.925
4	Ahtziri Sandoval	Mexico	12.750
5	Valentina Brostella	Panama	12.557
6	Diana Vásquez	Bolivia	10.875
7	Kaisa Chirinos	Honduras	9.900
8	Catalina Escobar	Colombia	9.700

Floor Exercise

Rank	Athlete	Nationality	Total
1st place, gold medalist(s)	Yesenia Ferrera	Cuba	13.800
2nd place, silver medalist(s)	Ayelén Tarabini	Argentina	13.300
3rd place, bronze medalist(s)	Valentina Brostella	Panama	12.400
4	Madison Copiak	Canada	12.375
5	Nicole Vázquez	Puerto Rico	12.225
6	Katriel de Sousa	Venezuela	12.050
7	Diana Vásquez	Bolivia	11.025
8	Catalina Escobar	Colombia	10.775

=== Trampoline ===
Men's individual trampoline

Rank	Athlete	Nationality	Total
1st place, gold medalist(s)	José Vargas	Mexico	55.660
2nd place, silver medalist(s)	Hunter Brewster	United States	54.685
3rd place, bronze medalist(s)	Lucas Adorno	Argentina	53.005
4	Rafael Andrade	Brazil	51.380
5	Lázaro Almirall	Cuba	49.135
6	Samory Ortíz	Puerto Rico	48.600
7	Vladimir Hoyos	Venezuela	46.975
8	Ángel Hernández	Colombia	34.755

Women's individual trampoline

Rank	Athlete	Nationality	Total
1st place, gold medalist(s)	Samantha Chavez	Mexico	51.365
2nd place, silver medalist(s)	Camilla Gomes	Brazil	48.465
3rd place, bronze medalist(s)	Dakota Earnest	United States	47.945
4	Mara Colombo	Argentina	47.050
5	Alida Rojo	Venezuela	42.695
6	Yunairis Socarras	Cuba	15.090
7	Katish Hernández	Colombia	10.965
