= 2017 South American Artistic Gymnastics Championships =

International artistic gymnastics competition

The 2017 South American Artistic Gymnastics Championships were held in Cochabamba, Bolivia, November 30 – December 2, 2017. The competition was organized by the Bolivian Gymnastics Federation and approved by the International Gymnastics Federation.

== Participating nations ==
- Argentina
- Bolivia
- Brazil
- Chile
- Colombia
- Ecuador
- Peru
- Uruguay

== Medalists ==
Event	Gold	Silver	Bronze
Men
Team all-around	Brazil; Lucas Bitencourt; Henrique Flores; Luís Porto; Péricles Silva; Leonardo Souza	Argentina; Andres Arean; Nicolas Cordoba; Santiago Mayol; Federico Molinari; Daniel Villafañe	Peru; Daniel Aguero; Mauricio Gallegos; Luis Pizarro; Arian Prado
Individual all-around	Lucas Bitencourt (BRA)	Israel Chiriboga (ECU)	Andrés Martínez (COL)
Floor exercise	Luís Porto (BRA)	Lucas Bitencourt (BRA)	Victor Rostagno (URU)
Pommel horse	Péricles Silva (BRA)	Israel Chiriboga (ECU)	Luís Porto (BRA) Andrés Martínez (COL)
Rings	Federico Molinari (ARG)	Lucas Bitencourt (BRA)	Daniel Villafañe (ARG) Henrique Flores (BRA)
Vault	Luís Porto (BRA)	Victor Rostagno (URU)	Daniel Villafañe (ARG)
Parallel bars	Péricles Silva (BRA)	Leonardo Souza (BRA)	Nicolas Cordoba (ARG)
Horizontal bar	Lucas Bitencourt (BRA)	Nicolas Cordoba (ARG)	Andrés Martínez (COL)
Women
Team all-around	Brazil; Maria Luiza França; Lorrane Oliveira; Carolyne Pedro; Anna Júlia Reis; Milleny Souza	Argentina; Camila Bonzo; Romina Pietrantuono; Agustina Pisos; Ayelén Tarabini; Ailen Valente	Bolivia; Roxana Cruz; Dianne Soria; Diana Vásquez
Individual all-around	Lorrane Oliveira (BRA)	Camila Bonzo (ARG)	Agustina Pisos (ARG)
Vault	Carolyne Pedro (BRA)	Ayelén Tarabini (ARG)	Denisse Grijalva (ECU)
Uneven bars	Lorrane Oliveira (BRA)	Agustina Pisos (ARG)	Camila Bonzo (ARG)
Balance beam	Agustina Pisos (ARG)	Ayelén Tarabini (ARG)	Venere Horna (PER)
Floor exercise	Ayelén Tarabini (ARG)	Carolyne Pedro (BRA)	Maria Luiza França (BRA)

== Medal table ==
Rank	Nation	Gold	Silver	Bronze	Total
1	Brazil (BRA)	11	4	3	18
2	Argentina (ARG)	3	7	5	15
3	Ecuador (ECU)	0	2	1	3
4	Uruguay (URU)	0	1	1	2
5	Colombia (COL)	0	0	3	3
6	Peru (PER)	0	0	2	2
7	Bolivia (BOL)	0	0	1	1
Totals (7 entries)		14	14	16	44
