= Renato Garín =

Chilean lawyer (born 1986)

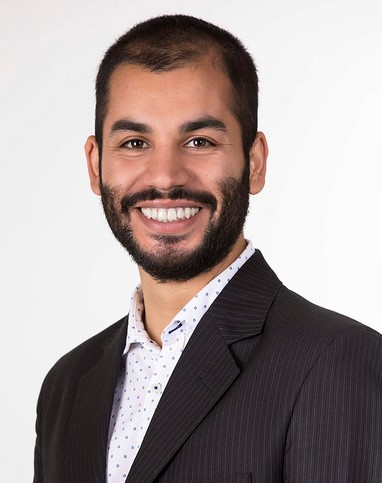

Member of the Constitutional Convention
- In office 4 July 2021 – 4 July 2022
- Constituency: 14th District

Member of the Chamber of Deputies
- In office 11 March 2018 – 1 January 2021
- Preceded by: Creation of the position
- Succeeded by: Marcela Sandoval
- Constituency: District 14

Personal details
- Born: 30 May 1986 (age 40) Santiago, Chile
- Party: Democratic Revolution (2016−2019); Independent (2019−present)
- Other political affiliations: Red Liberal (2010−2013); Fuerza Pública (2013−2014)
- Parent(s): Marco Antonio Garín; María Isabel González
- Education: University of Chile (LL.B); New York University (LL.M); Oxford University (M.Jur/BCL); Pontifical Catholic University of Chile (PhD)
- Occupation: Politician
- Profession: Lawyer

Renato Garín González (born 30 May 1986) is a Chilean lawyer and independent politician.

He served as a member of the Chamber of Deputies of Chile for the 14th District of the Metropolitan Region between 2018 and 2021, and was elected as a member of the Constitutional Convention in 2021, representing the same district.

== Early life and education ==
Garín was born on 30 May 1986 in Santiago, Chile. He is the son of Marco Antonio Garín Reyes and María Isabel González Miranda.

He completed his secondary education at Colegio Marambio of Melipilla in 2003. He later studied law at the University of Chile, qualifying as a lawyer on 23 March 2012. He holds a Master of Laws (LL.M.) from New York University and a Master of Jurisprudence/Bachelor of Civil Law (M.Jur/BCL) from the University of Oxford.

== Academic career ==
Garín has worked as a university professor at the University of Chile and the Alberto Hurtado University. He has also been active as a researcher, columnist, and author of several books.

== Political career ==
Garín is an independent politician. Between March and April 2010, he served as a legal adviser to the Studies Department of the Ministry General Secretariat of the Presidency (Chile). He was a member of Democratic Revolution (Chile) between 2016 and 2019.

In the 2017 parliamentary elections, he was elected as a deputy for the 14th District of the Metropolitan Region, serving in the Chamber of Deputies between 2018 and 2021.

In the elections held on 15–16 May 2021, Garín ran as an independent candidate for the Constitutional Convention representing the 14th District of the Metropolitan Region, on a seat supported by the Radical Party of Chile, within the Apruebo electoral list. He obtained 22,060 votes, corresponding to 7.28% of the valid votes cast, and was elected as a member of the convention.
