= Isabelle Cruz =

Brazilian artistic gymnast (born 1997)

- Full name: Isabelle Cristina Retamiro Cruz
- Born: 21 December 1997 (age 28) Rio de Janeiro, Brazil

Gymnastics career
- Discipline: Women's artistic gymnastics
- Country represented: Brazil
- Club: CR Flamengo
Medal record
Women's gymnastics
Representing Brazil
Pan American Championships
Silver medal – second place	2014 Mississauga	Team
South American Games
Gold medal – first place	2014 Santiago	Team
Silver medal – second place	2014 Santiago	Vault
South American Championships
Gold medal – first place	2013 Santiago	Team
Gold medal – first place	2013 Santiago	Vault

Isabelle Cristina Retamiro Cruz (born 21 December 1997) is a Brazilian artistic gymnast. She won a silver medal in the team event at the 2014 Pan American Championships and a vault silver medal at the 2014 South American Games. She was a member of the 2014 World Championships team.

== Gymnastics career ==
Cruz competed at the 2014 WOGA Classic and placed seventh in the all-around. At the 2014 South American Games, she helped Brazil win the team gold medal, and she won a silver medal on the vault, behind teammate Jade Barbosa. She then competed at the 2014 Brazilian Championships and finished fourth in the uneven bars final. At the 2014 Pan American Championships, she helped Brazil win the team silver medal, behind the United States. She also placed 13th in the all-around and advanced into the vault and floor exercise finals, finishing fifth in both. She was then selected to compete at the 2014 World Championships with the team that finished 16th in the qualification round. She contributed routines of the vault, balance beam, and floor exercise.

Cruz won a bronze medal on the vault at the 2015 Brazilian Championships. She placed fifth in the all-around at the 2016 Brazilian Championships and finished fourth in the vault final. She then finished eighth in the all-around at the 2017 Brazilian Championships. At the 2017 Brazilian Event Championships, she won a silver medal on the vault.

Cruz won a gold medal on the vault at the 2018 Brazilian Event Championships. She successfully defended her vault title at the 2019 Brazilian Event Championships. She then finished fourth in the all-around at the 2019 Brazilian Championships. These Championships were the final competition of her career.
