= Juliana Chaves Santos =

Brazilian artistic gymnast (born 1990)

- Born: 13 June 1990 (age 36) Porto Alegre, Rio Grande do Sul

Gymnastics career
- Discipline: Women's artistic gymnastics
- Country represented: Brazil
- Club: CR Flamengo
Medal record
Pan American Championships
Bronze medal – third place	2008 Rosario	Uneven bars
South American Games
Gold medal – first place	2014 Santiago	Team
South American Championships
Gold medal – first place	2013 Santiago	Team
Gold medal – first place	2013 Santiago	Balance beam
Silver medal – second place	2012 Rosario	Team
Silver medal – second place	2012 Rosario	Uneven bars
Silver medal – second place	2013 Santiago	Uneven bars

Juliana Chaves Santos (born 13 June 1990) is a Brazilian former artistic gymnast. She is the 2008 Pan American Championships bronze medalist on the uneven bars. She competed with the Brazilian team at the 2006 World Championships.

== Gymnastics career ==
Santos was called up to join the Brazilian national team and made her international debut at the 2006 Ghent World Cup. She was selected to compete at the 2006 World Championships alongside Laís Souza, Daniele Hypólito, Daiane dos Santos, Bruna da Costa, and Camila Comin. The team advanced into the team final and finished seventh. Santos did not compete in the team final but did compete on the uneven bars, balance beam, and floor exercise in the qualifications.

Santos won a bronze medal on the uneven bars at the 2008 Pan American Championships, behind Americans Samantha Shapiro and Corrie Lothrop. Additionally, she finished eighth in the balance beam final and fourth in the floor exercise final. At the 2010 Brazilian Championships, she helped the CR Flamengo club win the team title, and she placed tenth in the all-around.

Santos competed with the team that won a silver medal behind Argentina at the 2012 South American Championships. She also won a silver medal on the uneven bars, behind teammate Adrian Gomes. She competed on the uneven bars and the balance beam at the 2013 Doha World Cup but did not advance into either appartus final. At the 2013 South American Championships, she won a team gold medal, a balance beam gold medal, and an uneven bars silver medal. She won a gold medal in the team event at the 2014 South American Games. She competed on the uneven bars, balance beam, and floor exercise at the 2015 Brazilian Championships but has not competed since.
