= Lucas Bitencourt =

Brazilian artistic gymnast (born 1994)

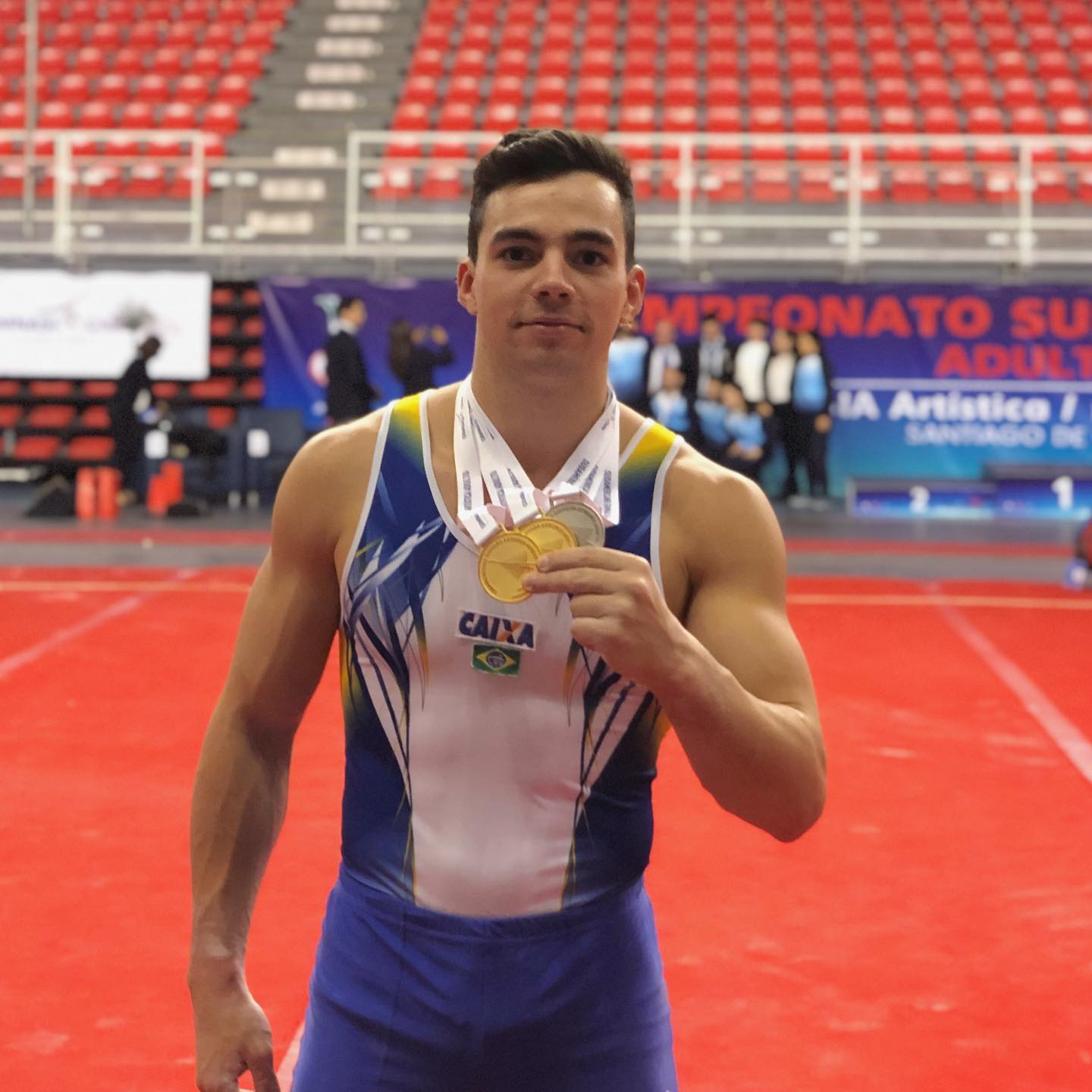
- Bitencourt at 2019 South American Artistic Gymnastics Championships

Personal information
- Full name: Lucas de Souza Bitencourt
- Born: 12 March 1994 (age 32) Nova Odessa, São Paulo

Gymnastics career
- Discipline: Men's artistic gymnastics
- Country represented: Brazil (2015)
Medal record
Men's gymnastics
Representing Brazil
Event	1st	2nd	3rd
FIG World Challenge Cup	1	1	0
Total	1	1	0
Pan American Games
Silver medal – second place	2015 Toronto	Team
Pan American Championships
Gold medal – first place	2024 Santa Marta	Team
Silver medal – second place	2022 Rio de Janeiro	Team
Bronze medal – third place	2014 Mississauga	Team
Bronze medal – third place	2018 Lima	Team
Bronze medal – third place	2023 Medellín	Team
South American Games
Gold medal – first place	2022 Asunción	Team
Silver medal – second place	2014 Santiago	Team
Silver medal – second place	2022 Asunción	All-around
South American Championships
Gold medal – first place	2012 Rosario	Team
Gold medal – first place	2017 Cochabamba	Team
Gold medal – first place	2017 Cochabamba	All-around
Gold medal – first place	2017 Cochabamba	Horizontal bar
Gold medal – first place	2019 Santiago	Team
Gold medal – first place	2019 Santiago	Floor exercise
Gold medal – first place	2019 Santiago	Rings
Gold medal – first place	2023 Cali	Team
Gold medal – first place	2023 Cali	Horizontal bar
Gold medal – first place	2024 Aracaju	Team
Silver medal – second place	2012 Rosario	All-around
Silver medal – second place	2013 Santiago	Team
Silver medal – second place	2013 Santiago	Pommel horse
Silver medal – second place	2017 Cochabamba	Floor exercise
Silver medal – second place	2017 Cochabamba	Rings
Silver medal – second place	2019 Santiago	Horizontal bar

Lucas de Souza Bitencourt (born 12 March 1994) is a Brazilian male artistic gymnast and part of the national team. He participated at the 2015 World Artistic Gymnastics Championships in Glasgow.
