= Arthur Mariano =

Brazilian artistic gymnast

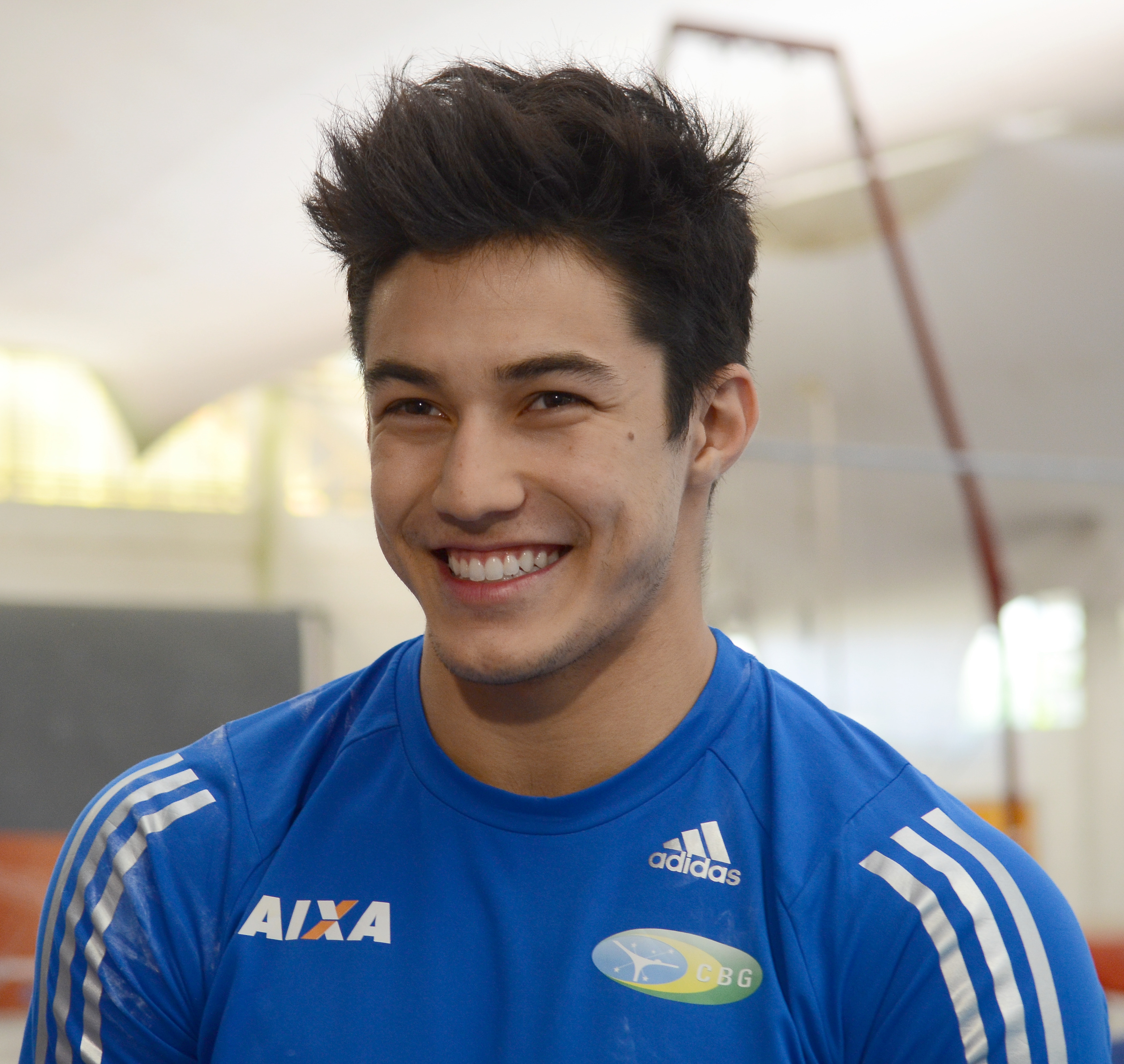
- Mariano in 2016

Personal information
- Full name: Arthur Nory Oyakawa Mariano
- Alternative name: Arthur Nory
- Born: 18 September 1993 (age 33) Campinas, Brazil
- Height: 169 cm (5 ft 7 in)

Gymnastics career
- Discipline: Men's artistic gymnastics
- Country represented: Brazil; (2011–present)
- Club: Pinheiros
- Head coaches: Cristiano Albino (personal); Marcos Goto (national)
Medal record
Men's artistic gymnastics
Representing Brazil
| Event | 1st | 2nd | 3rd |
|---|---|---|---|
| Olympic Games | 0 | 0 | 1 |
| World Championships | 1 | 0 | 1 |
| Pan American Games | 2 | 5 | 1 |
| Pan American Championships | 1 | 1 | 1 |
| Total | 4 | 6 | 4 |
Olympic Games
| Bronze medal – third place | 2016 Rio de Janeiro | Floor exercise |
World Championships
| Gold medal – first place | 2019 Stuttgart | Horizontal bar |
| Bronze medal – third place | 2022 Liverpool | Horizontal bar |
Pan American Games
| Gold medal – first place | 2019 Lima | Team |
| Gold medal – first place | 2023 Santiago | Horizontal bar |
| Silver medal – second place | 2015 Toronto | Team |
| Silver medal – second place | 2019 Lima | All-around |
| Silver medal – second place | 2019 Lima | Horizontal bar |
| Silver medal – second place | 2023 Santiago | Floor exercise |
| Silver medal – second place | 2023 Santiago | Vault |
| Bronze medal – third place | 2023 Santiago | Team |
Pan American Championships
| Gold medal – first place | 2021 Rio de Janeiro | Team |
| Silver medal – second place | 2022 Rio de Janeiro | Team |
| Bronze medal – third place | 2022 Rio de Janeiro | Horizontal Bar |
| Bronze medal – third place | 2026 Rio de Janeiro | Horizontal Bar |
South American Games
| Gold medal – first place | 2022 Asunción | Team |
| Gold medal – first place | 2022 Asunción | Floor exercise |
| Silver medal – second place | 2014 Santiago | Team |
South American Championships
| Gold medal – first place | 2011 Santiago | Team |
| Gold medal – first place | 2012 Rosario | Team |
| Gold medal – first place | 2012 Rosario | Floor exercise |
| Gold medal – first place | 2019 Santiago | Team |
| Gold medal – first place | 2019 Santiago | Horizontal bar |
| Silver medal – second place | 2019 Santiago | All-around |
| Bronze medal – third place | 2011 Santiago | Vault |
| Bronze medal – third place | 2012 Rosario | Vault |
| Bronze medal – third place | 2012 Rosario | Horizontal bar |

Arthur Nory Oyakawa Mariano (born 18 September 1993) is a Brazilian artistic gymnast and a member of the Brazilian national team. He is a three-time Olympian, having represented Brazil at the 2016, 2020, and 2024 Olympic Games. He is the 2016 Olympic bronze medalist on floor exercise as well as the 2019 World Champion and 2022 World bronze medalist on horizontal bar.

== Early life ==
Mariano was born in 1993, in Campinas, to a Brazilian father and a Japanese Brazilian mother. He practiced judo in a club as a child, following his father's footsteps. Mariano changed his mind after watching a gymnastics class.

After his parents' divorce, Mariano moved with his mother to São Paulo, where he joined a gymnastics team in another club. When he was eleven, Mariano joined Esporte Clube Pinheiros. Mariano won the Brazilian Child Gymnastics Championship when he was fourteen.

== Controversy ==
In 2015, Mariano and fellow gymnasts Felipe Arakawa and Henrique Flores were suspended from the Brazilian national team for a month, after publishing a Snapchat video in which they made racist jokes addressed at another teammate, Afro-Brazilian gymnast Ângelo Assumpção.

== Modeling career ==
Besides being a professional gymnast, Mariano is also an internationally signed model. In 2019, Mariano is the face of Philippine-based international clothing brand BENCH's men's wear campaign in Brazil and Latin America.

== Personal life ==
On 28 October 2021, Mariano revealed in an Instagram post that he is in a relationship with broadcast media marketing analyst João Otávio Tasso.

== Competitive history ==
| Year | Event | Team | AA | FX | PH | SR | VT | PB | HB |
|---|---|---|---|---|---|---|---|---|---|
2009
| 2009 | Pan American Championships (junior) | 1st place, gold medalist(s) | | | | | | | |
| 2011 | South American Championships | 1st place, gold medalist(s) | | 7 | | | 3rd place, bronze medalist(s) | | |
| 2012 | Olympic Test Event | 6 | | | | | | | |
| 2012 | South American Championships | 1st place, gold medalist(s) | | 1st place, gold medalist(s) | | | 3rd place, bronze medalist(s) | | 3rd place, bronze medalist(s) |
2013
| 2013 | World Championships | | 17 | | | | | | |
| 2014 | South American Games | 2nd place, silver medalist(s) | | | | | | | |
| 2014 | World Championships | 6 | 21 | | | | | | |
2015
| 2015 | Pan American Games | 2nd place, silver medalist(s) | | 5 | | | 7 | | 8 |
| 2015 | Osijek Challenge Cup | | | | | | | | 1st place, gold medalist(s) |
| 2015 | World Championships | 8 | 12 | | | | | | 4 |
| 2016 | Glasgow World Cup | | 2nd place, silver medalist(s) | | | | | | |
| 2016 | São Paulo Challenge Cup | | | 8 | | | 1st place, gold medalist(s) | | 5 |
| 2016 | Olympic Games | 6 | 17 | 3rd place, bronze medalist(s) | | | | | |
| 2017 | Varna Challenge Cup | | | 3rd place, bronze medalist(s) | | | 4 | | |
| 2017 | World Championships | | | 16 | | | | | 12 |
2018
| 2018 | World Championships | 7 | | | | | | | |
| 2018 | Cottbus World Cup | | | | | | | | 7 |
| 2018 | Swiss Cup | 6 | | | | | | | |
| 2019 | South American Championships | 1st place, gold medalist(s) | 2nd place, silver medalist(s) | | | | | | 1st place, gold medalist(s) |
| 2019 | Pan American Games | 1st place, gold medalist(s) | 2nd place, silver medalist(s) | | | | | | 2nd place, silver medalist(s) |
| 2019 | World Championships | 10 | | | | | | | 1st place, gold medalist(s) |
| 2021 | Doha World Cup | | | | | | | | 2nd place, silver medalist(s) |
| 2021 | Pan American Championships | 1st place, gold medalist(s) | | | | | | | 8 |
| 2021 | Olympic Games | 9 | | | | | | | |
| 2021 | Brazilian Championships | | | 3rd place, bronze medalist(s) | | | | | 1st place, gold medalist(s) |
| 2021 | World Championships | | | | | | | | 20 |
| 2022 | Brazil Trophy | | | | 4 | | 3rd place, bronze medalist(s) | 3rd place, bronze medalist(s) | 1st place, gold medalist(s) |
| 2022 | Pan American Championships | 2nd place, silver medalist(s) | | | | | | | 3rd place, bronze medalist(s) |
| 2022 | Paris Challenge Cup | | | | | | | | 9 |
| 2022 | South American Games | 1st place, gold medalist(s) | | 1st place, gold medalist(s) | | | | | |
| 2022 | Brazilian Championships | | | 3rd place, bronze medalist(s) | | | 3rd place, bronze medalist(s) | 2nd place, silver medalist(s) | 2nd place, silver medalist(s) |
| 2022 | World Championships | 7 | | | | | | | 3rd place, bronze medalist(s) |
| 2023 | Brazil Trophy | | | 1st place, gold medalist(s) | | | 4 | | |
| 2023 | Osijek Challenge Cup | | | 4 | | | | | 2nd place, silver medalist(s) |
| 2023 | Brazilian Championships | | | 1st place, gold medalist(s) | | | 2nd place, silver medalist(s) | | 1st place, gold medalist(s) |
| 2023 | Paris Challenge Cup | | | 5 | | | 5 | | 2nd place, silver medalist(s) |
| 2023 | World Championships | 13 | | | | | | | 6 |
| 2023 | Pan American Games | 3rd place, bronze medalist(s) | 9 | 2nd place, silver medalist(s) | | | 2nd place, silver medalist(s) | | 1st place, gold medalist(s) |
| 2024 | Cottbus World Cup | | | | | | | | 6 |
| 2024 | Baku World Cup | | | | | | | | 2nd place, silver medalist(s) |
| 2024 | Olympic Games | | | | | | | | 44 |
| 2026 | Brazil Trophy | | 1st place, gold medalist(s) | | | | | 4 | 1st place, gold medalist(s) |
| 2026 | Pan American Championships | 4 | | | | | | | 3rd place, bronze medalist(s) |
| 2026 | World Championships | 19 | | | | | | | |
