= Boris Merchan =

Ecuadorian artistic gymnast (born 1992)

Boris Merchán
- Full name: Boris Alexander Merchán Quiroz
- Born: 23 July 1992 (age 34)

Gymnastics career
- Discipline: Men's artistic gymnastics
- Country represented: Ecuador
Medal record
Men's Artistic Gymnastics
Representing Ecuador
Pan American Sports Festival
Bronze medal – third place	2014 Guadalajara	Vault
ALBA Games
Bronze medal – third place	2011 Barquisimeto	Floor Exercise

Boris Alexander Merchán Quiroz (born 23 July 1992) is an Ecuadorian male artistic gymnast, representing his nation at international competitions. At the 2014 Pan American Sports Festival he became the first artistic gymnast from Ecuador to win a Pan American medal of any kind (including the Pan American Cup, the Pan American Championships and the Pan American Games).
