= 2012 South American Artistic Gymnastics Championships =

International artistic gymnastics competition

The 2012 South American Artistic Gymnastics Championships were held in Rosario, Argentina, November 8–11, 2012. The competition was organized by the Santa Fe Gymnastics Federation and approved by the International Gymnastics Federation. This was the 11th edition of the South American Artistic Gymnastics Championships for senior gymnasts.

== Participating nations ==
- Argentina
- Bolivia
- Brazil
- Chile
- Colombia
- Panama
- Peru
- Uruguay

== Medalists ==
Event	Gold	Silver	Bronze
Men
Team all-around	Brazil; Francisco Barreto; Lucas Bitencourt; Caio Souza; Arthur Mariano; Henrique Flores; Pericles Silva	Argentina; Osvaldo Martínez; Federico Molinari; Juan Lompizano; Nicolás Córdoba; Sebastián Melchiori; Andres Arean	Peru; Mauricio Gallegos; Mario Berríos; David Figueroa; Jose Quilla; Renato Deza; Arian León Prado
Individual all-around	Francisco Barreto (BRA)	Lucas Bitencourt (BRA)	Osvaldo Martínez (ARG)
Floor exercise	Arthur Mariano (BRA)	Juan Pablo González (CHI)	Caio Souza (BRA)
Pommel horse	Juan Lompizano (ARG)	Javier Sandoval (COL)	Francisco Barreto (BRA)
Rings	Federico Molinari (ARG)	Henrique Flores (BRA)	Osvaldo Martínez (ARG)
Vault	Caio Souza (BRA)	Juan Pablo González (CHI)	Arthur Mariano (BRA)
Parallel bars	Javier Sandoval (COL)	Federico Molinari (ARG)	Francisco Barreto (BRA)
Horizontal bar	Francisco Barreto (BRA)	Nicolás Córdoba (ARG)	Arthur Mariano (BRA)
Women
Team all-around	Argentina; Valeria Pereyra; Ailen Valente; Merlina Galera; Camila Ambrosio; Camila Klesa; María Belén Stoffel	Brazil; Adrian Gomes; Juliana Chaves; Nadhine Ourives; Ingrid Messias; Letícia Costa	Chile; Makarena Pinto; Marcela Alvarez; Andrea Olivares; Bárbara Achondo; Melany Cabrera
Individual all-around	Adrian Gomes (BRA)	Melba Avendaño (COL)	María Belén Stoffel (ARG)
Vault	Bárbara Achondo (CHI)	Letícia Costa (BRA)	Adrian Gomes (BRA)
Uneven bars	Adrian Gomes (BRA)	Juliana Chaves (BRA)	María Belén Stoffel (ARG)
Balance beam	Adrian Gomes (BRA)	María Belén Stoffel (ARG)	Isabella Amado (PAN)
Floor exercise	Adrian Gomes (BRA)	Bárbara Achondo (CHI) Valeria Pereyra (ARG)	None awarded

== Medal table ==
Rank	Nation	Gold	Silver	Bronze	Total
1	Brazil (BRA)	9	5	6	20
2	Argentina (ARG)	3	5	4	12
3	Chile (CHI)	1	3	1	5
4	Colombia (COL)	1	2	0	3
5	Panama (PAN)	0	0	1	1
5	Peru (PER)	0	0	1	1
Totals (6 entries)		14	15	13	42
