= Gymnastics at the 2014 South American Games =

- Dates: March 8-18

Gymnastics at the 2014 South American Games in Santiago was held from March 8 to March 18.

== Medal summary ==
=== Medal table ===
Rank	Nation	Gold	Silver	Bronze	Total
1	Brazil (BRA)	12	8	5	25
2	Colombia (COL)	5	1	4	10
3	Chile (CHI)	3	5	5	13
4	Argentina (ARG)	1	3	5	9
5	Peru (PER)	0	1	0	1
Totals (5 entries)		21	18	19	58

== Gymnastics Artistic ==
=== Men ===
Event	Gold	Silver	Bronze
Team	Colombia; Jossimar Calvo; Carlos Calvo; Jhonny Muñoz; Jorge Hugo Giraldo; Javier Sandoval; William Calle	Brazil; Arthur Mariano; Francisco Junior; Sérgio Sasaki; Arthur Zanetti; Lucas Bitencourt; Pericles Silva	Argentina; Federico Molinari; Osvaldo Martinez; Andres Arean; Sebastian Melchiori; Mauro Martinez; Nicolas Cordoba
All-around	Jossimar Calvo; Colombia	Sérgio Sasaki; Brazil	Carlos Calvo; Colombia
Floor exercise	Tomás González; Chile	Juan Pablo González; Chile	Jossimar Calvo; Colombia
Pommel horse	Jhonny Muñoz; Colombia	Pericles Silva; Brazil	Francisco Junior; Brazil
Rings	Arthur Zanetti; Brazil	Federico Molinari; Argentina	Juan Raffo; Chile
Vault	Tomás González; Chile Sérgio Sasaki; Brazil	None awarded	Juan Pablo González; Chile
Parallel bars	Jorge Hugo Giraldo; Colombia	Jossimar Calvo; Colombia	Pericles Silva; Brazil
Horizontal bar	Sérgio Sasaki; Brazil	Nicolas Cordoba; Argentina	Osvaldo Martinez; Argentina

=== Women ===
Event	Gold	Silver	Bronze
Team	Brazil; Daniele Hypólito; Isabelle Cruz; Jade Barbosa; Juliana Santos; Julie Sinmon; Lorrane Oliveira	Chile; Makarena Pinto; Melany Cabrera; Martina Castro; Barbara Achondo; Simona Castro; Franchesca Santi	Colombia; Bibiana Vélez; Ginna Escobar; Lizeth Ruiz; Yurany Avendaño; Marcela Sandoval
All-around	Jade Barbosa; Brazil	Simona Castro; Chile	Julie Sinmon; Brazil Makarena Pinto; Chile
Vault	Jade Barbosa; Brazil	Isabelle Cruz; Brazil	Makarena Pinto; Chile
Uneven bars	Bibiana Vélez; Colombia	Jade Barbosa; Brazil	Yurany Avendaño; Colombia
Balance beam	Simona Castro; Chile	Mariana Chiarella; Peru	Melany Cabrera; Chile
Floor exercise	Daniele Hypólito; Brazil	Barbara Achondo; Chile Makarena Pinto; Chile	None awarded

== Rhythmic Gymnastics ==
=== Medalists ===
Event	Gold	Silver	Bronze
All-around	Angélica Kvieczynski; Brazil	Natália Gaudio; Brazil	Ana Carrasco Pini; Argentina
Hoop	Angélica Kvieczynski; Brazil	Ana Carrasco Pini; Argentina	Natália Gaudio; Brazil
Ball	Natália Gaudio; Brazil	Angélica Kvieczynski; Brazil	Camila Giorgi; Argentina
Clubs	Ana Carrasco Pini; Argentina Natália Gaudio; Brazil	None awarded	Andressa Jardim; Brazil
Ribbon	Angélica Kvieczynski; Brazil	Natália Gaudio; Brazil	Ana Carrasco Pini; Argentina
