= Lorrane Oliveira =

Brazilian artistic gymnast

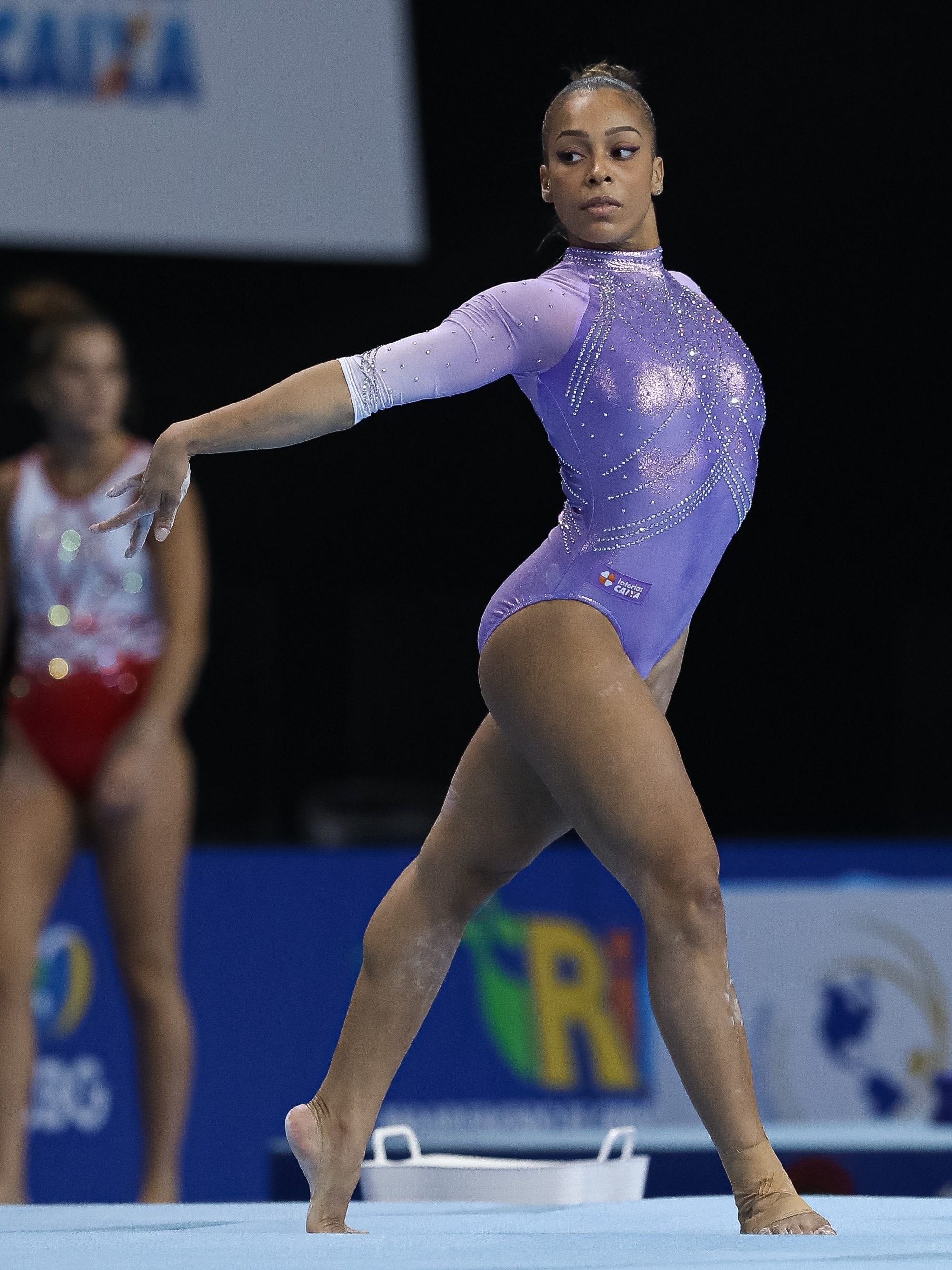
- Oliveira at the 2021 Pan American Championships

Personal information
- Full name: Lorrane dos Santos Oliveira
- Born: 13 April 1998 (age 28) Nova Iguaçu, Rio de Janeiro, Brazil
- Height: 1.55 m (5 ft 1 in)

Gymnastics career
- Discipline: Women's artistic gymnastics
- Country represented: Brazil; (2013–present)
- Club: Clube de Regatas do Flamengo
- Head coach: Francisco Porath
- Eponymous skills: Oliveira (E) (floor exercise): double Arabian piked half out
Medal record
Representing Brazil
Women's artistic gymnastics
Olympic Games
| Bronze medal – third place | 2024 Paris | Team |
World Championships
| Silver medal – second place | 2023 Antwerp | Team |
Pan American Games
| Bronze medal – third place | 2015 Toronto | Team |
| Bronze medal – third place | 2019 Lima | Team |
Pan American Championships
| Gold medal – first place | 2021 Rio de Janeiro | Team |
| Gold medal – first place | 2021 Rio de Janeiro | Uneven bars |
| Gold medal – first place | 2022 Rio de Janeiro | Team |
| Silver medal – second place | 2018 Lima | Team |
| Bronze medal – third place | 2021 Rio de Janeiro | All-around |
South American Games
| Gold medal – first place | 2014 Santiago | Team |
South American Championships
| Gold medal – first place | 2017 Cochabamba | Team |
| Gold medal – first place | 2017 Cochabamba | All-around |
| Gold medal – first place | 2017 Cochabamba | Uneven bars |
FIG World Cup
| Event | 1st | 2nd | 3rd |
|---|---|---|---|
| World Cup | 0 | 0 | 2 |
| World Challenge Cup | 0 | 1 | 1 |
| Total | 0 | 1 | 3 |

Lorrane dos Santos Oliveira (born 13 April 1998) is a Brazilian artistic gymnast. She was a member of the Brazilian teams that won historic medals at the 2024 Summer Olympics and the 2023 World Championships. She also won team bronze medals at the 2015 and 2019 Pan American Games. Individually, she is the 2021 Pan American uneven bars champion and all-around bronze medalist. She also represented Brazil at the 2016 Summer Olympics.

== Early life ==
Oliveira was inspired to do gymnastics by watching Daiane dos Santos become a World champion in 2003. Initially, her stepfather put her in circus classes, but she insisted she switch to gymnastics and began the sport at age nine. She had a younger sister who died unexpectedly in 2024.

== Gymnastics career ==
Oliveira won a gold medal on the floor exercise at the 2013 Olympic Hopes meet held in Penza, Russia. She competed at the 2013 South American Junior Championships, winning a gold medal with the Brazilian team and tying with Flávia Saraiva for the individual all-around gold medal. In the event finals, she won the gold medal on the floor exercise and silver medals on the vault and uneven bars, both behind Rebeca Andrade.

=== 2014–15 ===
Oliveira became age-eligible for senior competitions in 2014. She won the gold medal with the Brazilian team at the 2014 South American Games. She had surgery on both of her shoulders in 2014. As a result, she missed the rest of the competition season.

Oliveira returned to competition in 2015. At the 2015 Ljubljana World Cup, she won a silver medal on the balance beam behind Canada's Isabela Onyshko. She then placed eighth on the floor exercise at the São Paulo World Cup. At the 2015 Pan American Games, Oliveira fell on the floor exercise but still contributed toward Brazil's bronze medal win. She then competed at a friendly meet where the Brazilian team beat Germany and Switzerland. Then at the 2015 World Championships, Oliveira and the Brazilian team placed ninth in the qualification round, around half of a point away from the team final and a direct Olympic berth. Brazil instead qualified for the 2016 Olympic Test Event. Individually, Oliveira qualified for the all-around final and finished 18th. After the World Championships, Oliveira won the all-around title at the Brazilian Championships.

=== 2016–17 ===
Oliveira began the Olympic season at the Houston National Invitational and won the all-around gold medal. She then competed at the 2016 American Cup and finished last out of the nine competitors due to falls on the uneven bars, balance beam, and floor exercise.

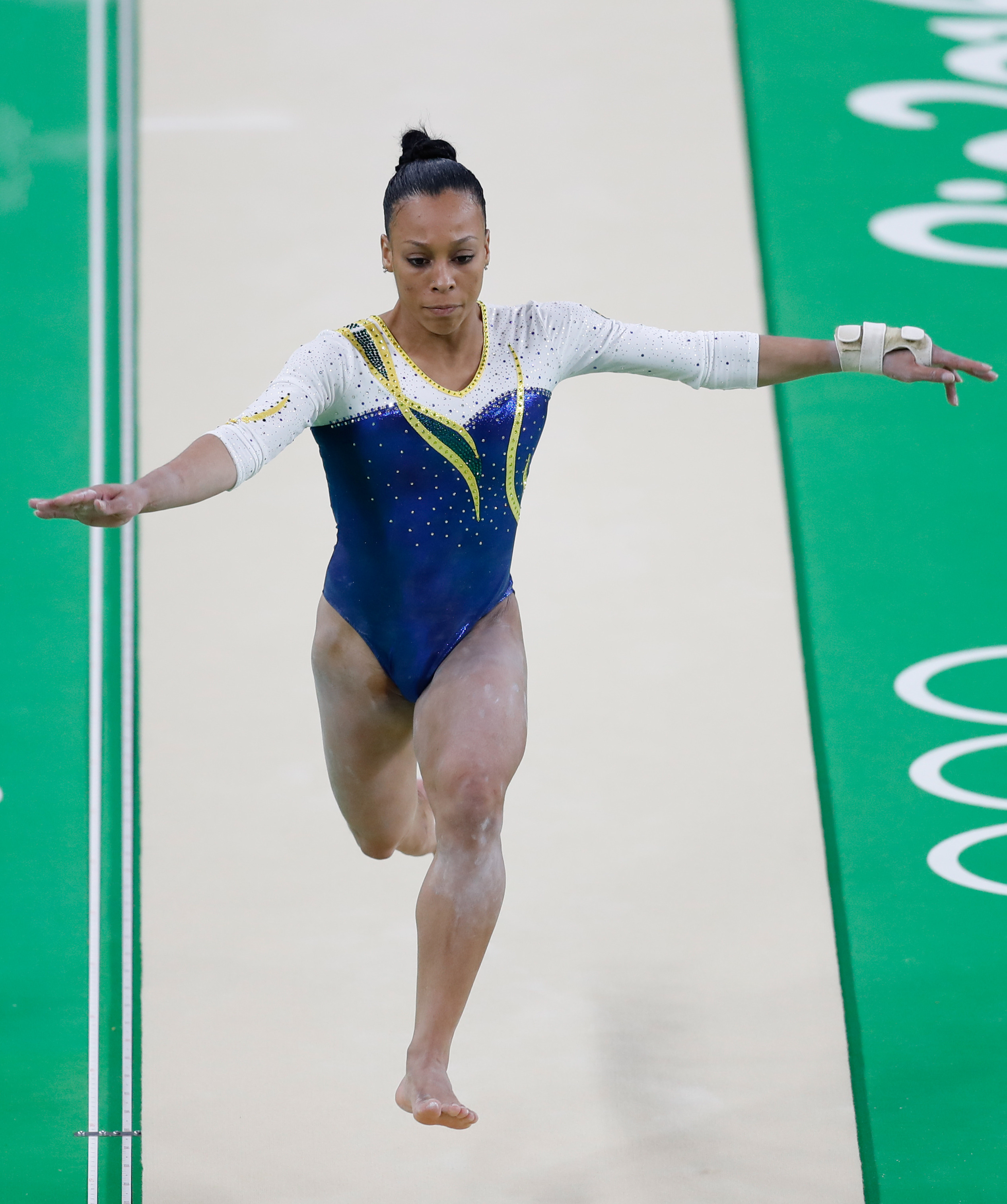
Oliveira vaulting at the 2016 Olympic Games

Oliveira was selected to compete at the Olympic Test Event alongside Rebeca Andrade, Jade Barbosa, Daniele Hypólito, Carolyne Pedro, and Flávia Saraiva for the last change to earn a team berth for the Olympic Games. The Brazilian team won the gold medal in the team event and qualified a full team to the 2016 Summer Olympics.

Oliveira placed fourth in the uneven bars final at the 2016 São Paulo World Challenge Cup. She then finished fifth on the uneven bars at the Anadia World Challenge Cup. After the Anadia World Cup, she was named to represent Brazil at the 2016 Summer Olympics alongside Andrade, Barbosa, Hypólito, and Saraiva. Her final competition in preparation for the Olympics was a friendly meet in the Netherlands where she finished seventh in the all-around. At the 2016 Summer Olympics, she competed on the vault and uneven bars during the qualification round and helped Brazil qualify for the team finals in fifth place. She competed on the same two apparatuses during the team finals where Brazil finished eighth.

After the Olympic Games, Oliveira stopped training due to a foot injury and had surgery in December 2016. She returned to training in April 2017. In October 2017, she won the gold medal on the uneven bars at the Brazilian Apparatus Championships. She then won gold medals with the Brazilian team, in the all-around, and on the uneven bars at the 2017 South American Championships.

=== 2018–19 ===
Oliveira only competed on the uneven bars at the 2018 Brazilian Championships and won the gold medal. She then won a silver medal with the Brazilian team at the 2018 Pan American Championships. She was then selected to compete at the 2018 World Championships alongside Rebeca Andrade, Jade Barbosa, Thaís Fidélis, and Flávia Saraiva. She competed on the uneven bars, balance beam, and floor exercise during the qualification round and helped the team qualify for the team final in fifth place. She was not selected to compete on any apparatus during the team final, and the Brazilian team placed seventh.

Oliveira finished fourth in the all-around at the 2019 Brazilian Championships, and in the event finals, she won gold on the uneven bars and silver on the balance beam. She won a bronze medal with the Brazilian team at the 2019 Pan American Games. She then competed at the 2019 World Championships where the Brazilian team only placed 14th due to various injuries and did not qualify as a team for the 2020 Olympic Games.

=== 2021–22 ===
Oliveira won a team gold medal at the 2021 Pan American Championships alongside Rebeca Andrade, Christal Bezerra, Ana Luiza Lima, and Júlia Soares. Individually, she placed fourth in the all-around, but she received the bronze medal following Martina Dominici's suspension for using a banned substance. Oliveira also won a gold medal on the uneven bars. At the 2021 Doha World Cup, Oliveira debuted a new skill, a piked double Arabian half out on floor, which was named after her in the Code of Points. The skill adds an extra half twist to the tumbling pass created by Brazilian World floor exercise champion Daiane dos Santos. She won bronze medals on both the uneven bars and floor exercise. Then at the 2021 Brazilian Championships, she won a silver medal in the all-around behind Rebeca Andrade, and she won a gold medal on the uneven bars.

Oliveira competed on the uneven bars during the team final of the 2022 Pan American Championships, helping Brazil defeat the United States for the team gold medal. Then at the Brazilian Championships, she placed fifth in the all-around. She then placed seventh on the uneven bars at the Paris World Challenge Cup. In October, Oliveira was named to the team to compete at the 2022 World Championships in Liverpool alongside Flávia Saraiva, Júlia Soares, Rebeca Andrade, and Carolyne Pedro. In the team final, Brazil finished fourth behind the United States, Great Britain and Canada.

=== 2023–24 ===
Oliveira began the 2023 season at the Brazil Trophy, winning gold on the uneven bars and silver on the balance beam. She then placed fourth on the uneven bars at the Osijek World Challenge Cup. She won the all-around bronze medal at the 2023 Brazilian Championships behind Jade Barbosa and Júlia Soares. At the 2023 World Championships, Oliveira competed on the uneven bars and helped the Brazilian team win the silver medal behind the United States. It was the first time Brazil or any South American country won a team medal at the World Artistic Gymnastics Championships. Additionally, the Brazilian team secured a berth for the 2024 Summer Olympics.

Oliveira placed sixth on the uneven bars at the 2024 Antalya World Challenge Cup. Then at the Brazil Trophy, she placed fourth on the uneven bars and fifth on the balance beam. She was selected to represent Brazil at the 2024 Summer Olympics alongside Rebeca Andrade, Jade Barbosa, Flávia Saraiva, and Júlia Soares. In the team final, Oliveira competed on uneven bars, and Brazil ended up winning the bronze medal behind the United States and Italy. This was the first ever Olympic team medal for Brazil.

== Eponymous skill ==
Oliveira has a floor exercise tumbling pass named after her in the Code of Points.

| Apparatus | Name | Description | Difficulty (Note: Valid for the 2025–2028 Code of Points) | Added to Code of Points |
|---|---|---|---|---|
| Floor exercise | Oliveira | Arabian double salto piked with ½ twist | E (0.5) | 2021 Doha World Cup |

== Competitive history ==
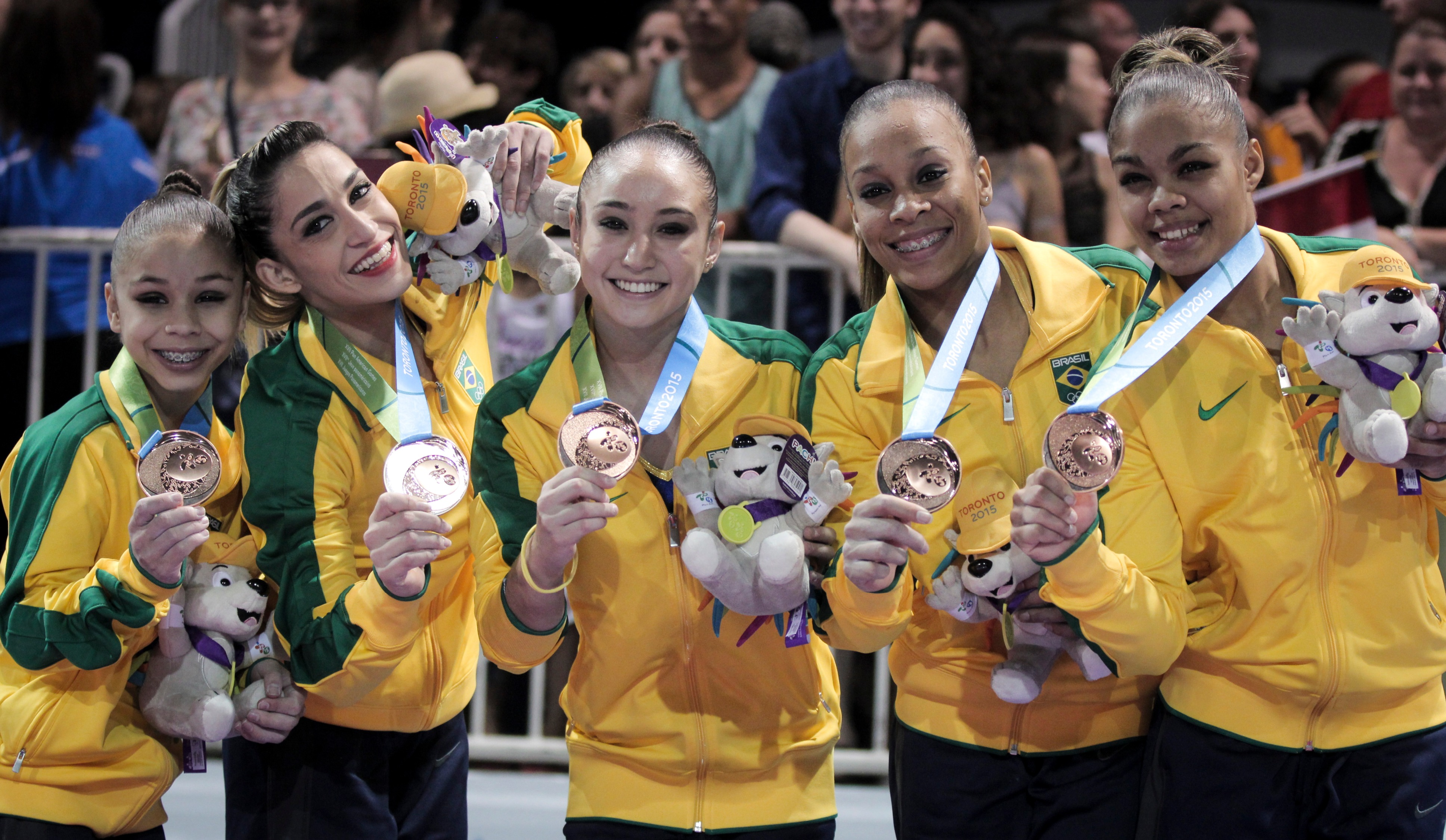
Oliveira (second from the right) and the Brazilian team at the 2015 Pan American Games

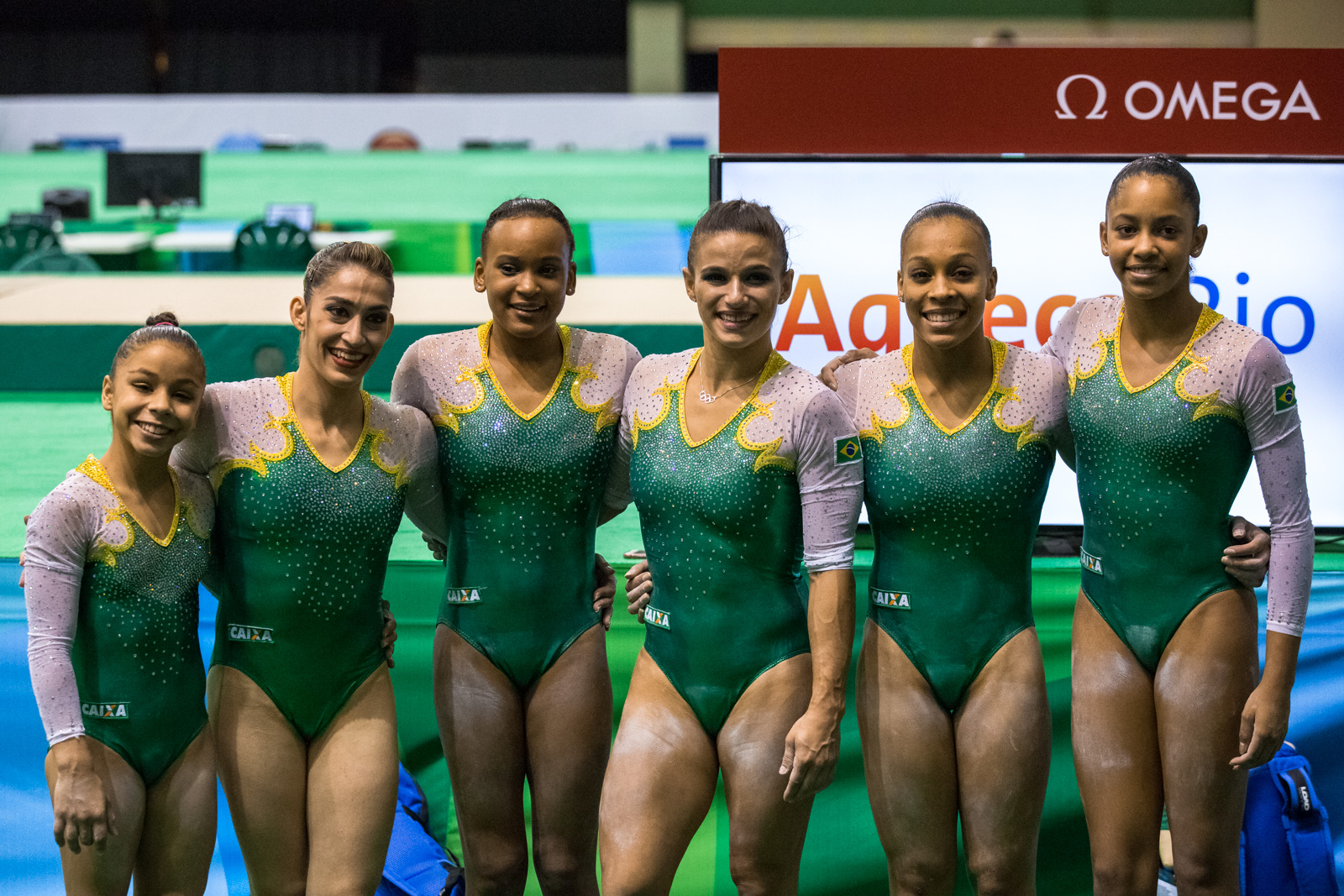
Oliveira (second from the right) at the 2016 Olympic Test Event

Competitive history of Lorrane Oliveira
| Year | Event | Team | AA | VT | UB | BB | FX |
|---|---|---|---|---|---|---|---|
| 2013 | Olympic Hopes | | 8 | | | | 1st place, gold medalist(s) |
| 2013 | South American Junior Championships | 1st place, gold medalist(s) | 1st place, gold medalist(s) | 2nd place, silver medalist(s) | 2nd place, silver medalist(s) | | 1st place, gold medalist(s) |
| 2014 | South American Games | 1st place, gold medalist(s) | | | | | |
| 2015 | Ljubljana World Cup | | | | | 2nd place, silver medalist(s) | |
| 2015 | São Paulo World Cup | | | | | | 8 |
| 2015 | Pan American Games | 3rd place, bronze medalist(s) | | | | | |
| 2015 | Länderkampf Kunstturnen | 1st place, gold medalist(s) | 5 | | | | |
| 2015 | World Championships | 9 | 18 | | | | |
| 2015 | Brazilian Championships | | 1st place, gold medalist(s) | | 1st place, gold medalist(s) | 3rd place, bronze medalist(s) | 1st place, gold medalist(s) |
| 2016 | Houston National Invitational | | 1st place, gold medalist(s) | | | | |
| 2016 | American Cup | | 9 | | | | |
| 2016 | Olympic Test Event | 1st place, gold medalist(s) | | | | | |
| 2016 | São Paulo World Challenge Cup | | | | 4 | | |
| 2016 | Anadia World Challenge Cup | | | | 5 | | |
| 2016 | Dutch Olympic Qualifier | | 7 | | | | |
| 2016 | Olympic Games | 8 | | | | | |
| 2017 | Brazilian Apparatus Championships | | | | 1st place, gold medalist(s) | | |
| 2017 | South American Championships | 1st place, gold medalist(s) | 1st place, gold medalist(s) | | 1st place, gold medalist(s) | | |
| 2018 | Brazilian Championships | | | | 1st place, gold medalist(s) | | |
| 2018 | Pan American Championships | 2nd place, silver medalist(s) | | | | | |
| 2018 | World Championships | 7 | | | | | |
| 2019 | Brazilian Championships | | 4 | | 1st place, gold medalist(s) | 2nd place, silver medalist(s) | 6 |
| 2019 | Pan American Games | 3rd place, bronze medalist(s) | | | 4 | | |
| 2019 | World Championships | 14 | | | | | |
2021
| 2021 | Pan American Championships | 1st place, gold medalist(s) | 3rd place, bronze medalist(s) | | 1st place, gold medalist(s) | | |
| 2021 | Doha World Cup | | | | 3rd place, bronze medalist(s) | | 3rd place, bronze medalist(s) |
| 2021 | Brazilian Championships | | 2nd place, silver medalist(s) | | 1st place, gold medalist(s) | | |
2022
| 2022 | Pan American Championships | 1st place, gold medalist(s) | | | | | |
| 2022 | Brazilian Championships | | 5 | | 2nd place, silver medalist(s) | | |
| 2022 | Paris World Challenge Cup | | | | 7 | | |
| 2022 | World Championships | 4 | | | | | |
| 2023 | Brazil Trophy | | | | 1st place, gold medalist(s) | 2nd place, silver medalist(s) | |
| 2023 | Osijek World Challenge Cup | | | | 4 | | |
| 2023 | Brazilian Championships | | 3rd place, bronze medalist(s) | | 2nd place, silver medalist(s) | | 3rd place, bronze medalist(s) |
| 2023 | World Championships | 2nd place, silver medalist(s) | | | | | |
| 2024 | Antalya World Challenge Cup | | | | 6 | | |
| 2024 | Brazil Trophy | | | | 4 | 5 | |
| 2024 | Olympic Games | 3rd place, bronze medalist(s) | | | | | |
| 2026 | Szombathely World Challenge Cup | | | | 4 | | 3rd place, bronze medalist(s) |
| 2026 | World Championships | 5 | 21 | | | | |
