= Yurany Avendaño =

Colombian artistic gymnast (born 1993)

- Full name: Melba Yurany Avendaño Romero
- Born: 5 January 1993 (age 33) Cúcuta, Colombia
- Height: 158 cm (5 ft 2 in)

Gymnastics career
- Discipline: Women's artistic gymnastics
- Country represented: Colombia
Medal record
Central American and Caribbean Games
Bronze medal – third place	2014 Veracruz	Team
South American Games
Silver medal – second place	2010 Medellín	Team
Bronze medal – third place	2014 Santiago	Team
Bronze medal – third place	2014 Santiago	Uneven bars
Bronze medal – third place	2018 Cochabamba	Team
South American Championships
Silver medal – second place	2009 Sogamoso	Team
Silver medal – second place	2009 Sogamoso	Vault
Silver medal – second place	2011 Santiago	Uneven bars
Silver medal – second place	2012 Rosario	All-around
Silver medal – second place	2015 Cali	Team
Bronze medal – third place	2015 Cali	All-around
Bronze medal – third place	2015 Cali	Vault
Bronze medal – third place	2015 Cali	Uneven bars
Bolivarian Games
Gold medal – first place	2017 Santa Marta	Team
Gold medal – first place	2017 Santa Marta	Uneven bars
Silver medal – second place	2017 Santa Marta	All-around

Melba Yurany Avendaño Romero (born 5 January 1993) is a Colombian artistic gymnast. She is a four-time South American Games medalist and the 2012 South American Championships all-around silver medalist. She won four medals at the 2015 South American Championships, and she is the 2017 Bolivarian Games uneven bars champion.

== Gymnastics career ==
At the 2009 South American Championships, Avendaño won silver medals in the team competition and on the vault. She then won another team silver medal at the 2010 South American Games. She then competed at the 2010 World Championships and finished 34th with the Colombian team. At the 2011 South American Championships, she won a silver medal on the uneven bars behind Valeria Pereyra. She also helped Colombia place fourth at the 2011 Pan American Games. In 2013, she dislocated and fractured her elbow and was out of competition for an entire year. At the 2014 Central American and Caribbean Games, she won a bronze medal with the Colombian team.

Avendaño won the all-around title at the 2015 Colombian Championships. At the 2015 South American Championships, she helped Colombia win the silver medal behind Brazil. Individually, she won bronze medals in the all-around and on the vault and uneven bars. She then represented Colombia at the 2015 Pan American Games and finished tenth in the all-around final. She tore her ACL while competing vault at the 2015 World Championships. This injury caused her to miss the qualifying events for the 2016 Summer Olympics.

Avendaño returned to competition after 18 months out at the 2017 Colombian Championships and won the all-around title by over a point. She also won gold medals in the vault and floor exercise finals. At the 2017 Bolivarian Games, she helped Colombia win the team competition and also won a silver medal in the all-around. She then won another gold medal in the uneven bars final.

Avendaño won a bronze medal with the Colombian team at the 2018 South American Games. She stopped competing in 2018 and retired from competition.
