= Julie Sinmon =

Brazilian artistic gymnast (born 1998)

Julie Kim Sinmon
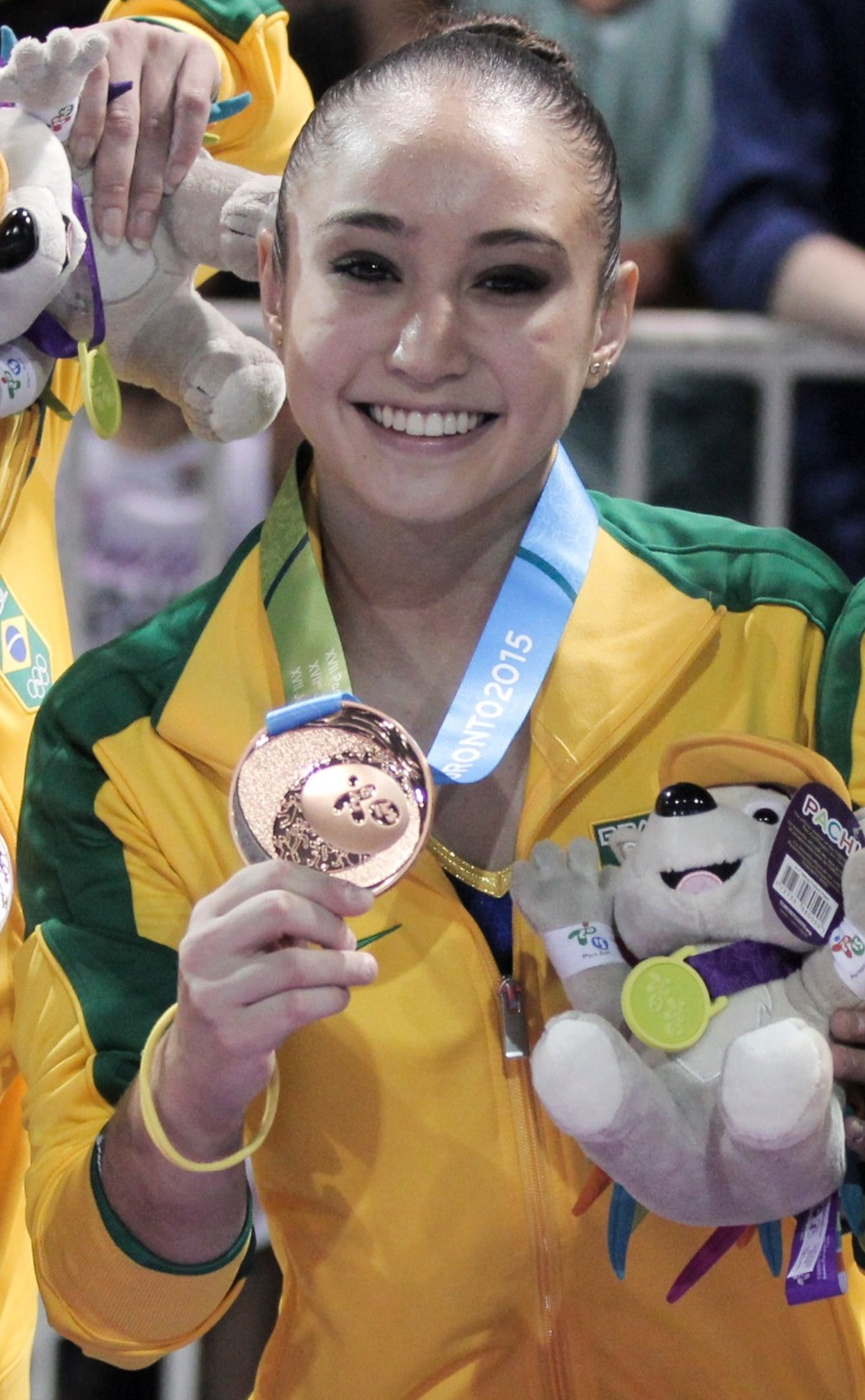
- Sinmon at the 2015 Pan American Games

Personal information
- Born: 10 March 1998 (age 28) São Paulo
- Height: 147 cm (4 ft 10 in)

Gymnastics career
- Discipline: Women's artistic gymnastics
- Country represented: Brazil
- Club: Flamengo
Medal record
Women's artistic gymnastics
Representing Brazil
Pan American Games
| Bronze medal – third place | 2015 Toronto | Team |
Pan American Championships
| Silver medal – second place | 2014 Mississauga | Team |
| Bronze medal – third place | 2014 Mississauga | Balance beam |
South American Games
| Gold medal – first place | 2014 Santiago | Team |
| Bronze medal – third place | 2014 Santiago | All-around |
Event / 1st / 2nd / 3rd; FIG World Challenge Cup / 0 / 0 / 1

Julie Kim Sinmon (born 10 March 1998) is a Brazilian former artistic gymnast. She won a bronze medal in the team event at the 2015 Pan American Games, and she competed at the 2014 World Championships. She won a bronze medal on the balance beam at the 2014 Pan American Championships.

== Gymnastics career ==
Sinmon competed at the 2013 Nadia Comăneci Invitational in Oklahoma City, finishing 13th in the junior all-around. She then competed with the Brazilian junior team that won a silver medal at the 2013 Gymnasiade.

Sinmon became age-eligible for senior international competitions in 2014. She won a bronze medal in the all-around at the 2014 South American Games in addition to helping Brazil win team gold. She helped the Brazilian team win a silver medal behind the United States at the 2014 Pan American Championships, where she also won a bronze medal on the balance beam. She was then selected for the 2014 World Championships team, where Brazil finished 16th in the qualification round.

Sinmon began the 2015 season at the Ljubljana World Challenge Cup, where she won a bronze medal on the balance beam. She was then selected to represent Brazil at the 2015 Pan American Games, helping the team win the bronze medal. Individually, she advanced into the balance beam final and finished fourth. She tore her ACL in the lead-up to the 2015 World Championships and was unable to compete.

Sinmon returned to competition at the 2016 Varna World Challenge Cup. She only competed on the uneven bars and did not advance beyond the qualifications. She was not selected for Brazil's 2016 Olympic team. She announced her retirement from the sport in October 2017, citing challenges returning to competition after her knee injury.
