= Isabella Amado =

Panamanian artistic gymnast (born 1996)

- Full name: Isabella del Carmen Amado Medrano
- Nickname: Isa
- Born: 9 August 1996 (age 30) Panama City, Panama
- Height: 155 cm (5 ft 1 in)

Gymnastics career
- Discipline: Women's artistic gymnastics
- Country represented: Panama (2012–2016)
- College team: Boise State Broncos (2017–2020)
- Training location: Virginia Beach, Virginia
- Club: Excalibur Gymnastics
Medal record
Women's artistic gymnastics
Representing Panama
South American Championships
Silver medal – second place	2013 Santiago	Balance beam
Bronze medal – third place	2012 Rosario	Balance beam
Bolivarian Games
Bronze medal – third place	2013 Trujillo	Vault
Bronze medal – third place	2013 Trujillo	Balance beam
Central American Games
Gold medal – first place	2013 San Jose	Vault
Bronze medal – third place	2013 San Jose	All-around
Bronze medal – third place	2013 San Jose	Uneven bars
Bronze medal – third place	2013 San Jose	Balance beam
FIG World Cup
Event / 1st / 2nd / 3rd; World Challenge Cup / 1 / 1 / 2

Isabella del Carmen Amado Medrano (born 9 August 1996) is a Panamanian former artistic gymnast. She became Panama's first Olympian in artistic gymnastics when she competed at the 2016 Summer Olympics. She is a two-time South American Championships medalist on the balance beam. Additionally, she is the 2013 Central American Games vault champion and a four-time medalist in the FIG World Cup series.

== Early life ==
Amado was born in Panama City on 9 August 1996. Her father, Camilo Amado, is the former president of the Panama Olympic Committee. She began gymnastics when she was five years old. At the age of 14, she moved to Virginia Beach, Virginia, to improve her training conditions.

== Gymnastics career ==
Amado won a bronze medal on the balance beam at the 2012 South American Championships. She then won the balance beam silver medal at the 2013 South American Championships. At the 2013 Bolivarian Games, she won bronze medals on the vault and the balance beam. She won four medals at the 2013 Central American Games, including the vault gold medal.

Amado finished fourth on the vault and fifth on the floor exercise at the 2014 Pacific Rim Championships. She finished 86th in the all-around qualifications at the 2014 World Championships. After the World Championships, she competed at the Medellin World Challenge Cup and won the gold medal on the balance beam and the bronze medal on the vault.

Amado won a silver medal on the floor exercise at the 2015 Varna World Challenge Cup, behind Ilaria Käslin. Then at the Osijek World Challenge Cup, she won a bronze medal on the balance beam, behind Jade Barbosa and Dorina Böczögő. She represented Panama at the 2015 Pan American Games and finished 18th in the all-around final.

At the 2015 World Championships, Amado fell on multiple events and missed the cutoff for qualification to the 2016 Summer Olympics. However, she received an invitation from the Tripartite Commission to represent Panama at the 2016 Summer Olympics. She became Panama's first Olympian in artistic gymnastics. She finished 44th in the all-around during the qualification round and did not advance into any finals.

Amado earned a scholarship to compete for Boise State University's gymnastics team beginning in the 2017 season. She competed on the balance beam during her freshman and sophomore seasons and was named to the Mountain Rim Gymnastics Conference All-Academic team both years. In 2019, she won the Mountain Rim Gymnastics Conference balance beam title with a score of 9.900 and also began competing on the vault and floor exercise. Her senior season was cut short by the breakout of the COVID-19 pandemic in the United States, leading to her retirement.

== Personal life ==
After graduating from Boise State University in May 2021, Amado enrolled in the Burnett School of Medicine. She graduated in 2025 and began her residency at the VCU Medical Center in orthopedic surgery.
