= Simona Castro =

Chilean artistic gymnast (born 1989)

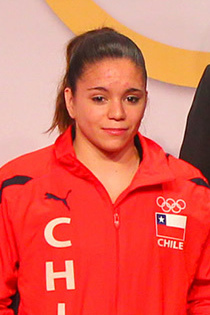
- Castro in 2012

Personal information
- Full name: Simona Paz Castro Lazo
- Born: January 11, 1989 (age 37)

Gymnastics career
- Discipline: Women's artistic gymnastics
- Country represented: Chile
Medal record
Women's gymnastics
Representing Chile
Pan American Championships
Bronze medal – third place	2012 Medellín	Balance Beam
South American Games
Gold medal – first place	2014 Santiago	Balance Beam
Silver medal – second place	2014 Santiago	Team
Silver medal – second place	2014 Santiago	All-Around
South American Championships
Silver medal – second place	2011 Santiago	Balance Beam
Silver medal – second place	2019 Santiago	Team
Bronze medal – third place	2013 Santiago	All-Around
Bronze medal – third place	2011 Santiago	Team
Gold medal – first place	2007 Villavicencio	Floor Exercise

Simona Castro OLY (born January 11, 1989) is a Chilean gymnast who competed at the 2012, 2016, and 2020 Olympic Games. She has a sister who is an artistic gymnast, Martina Castro.

She has been a part of the Chile National Gymnastics team since 2001. At the 2005 World Championships in Melbourne, she debuted at the senior international level, achieving 53rd place in the all-around. At the 2007 South American Championships in Colombia, she won the gold medal in the floor exercise. In 2009, she left Santiago to begin her college career at the University of Denver, majoring in business administration. At the 2011 South American Championships in Santiago, she won the silver medal on the balance beam. That same year at World Championships in Tokyo, Japan she achieved 76th place, creating the spot for Chile at the Test Event in January 2012. She achieved the best result ever for a Chilean female gymnast at the world level. At the 2012 Pan-American Championships in Medellín, Colombia, she won the bronze on the balance beam. In March 2014, she won gold on the balance beam and silver in the All Around at South American Games, hosted in Santiago, Chile.

== London 2012 ==
On January 11, 2012, she achieved 24th place at the Test Event in London to give her a spot at the 2012 Summer Olympics. At the games, she finished in 43rd place in the all-around.

== Rio 2016 ==
She also competed at the 2016 Olympics, finishing 52nd in the individual all-around.
