= Nicolás Córdoba =

Argentine artistic gymnast (born 1989)

- Full name: Nicolás Martín Córdoba
- Nickname: El Colo
- Born: 20 November 1989 (age 36) Santa Fe, Argentina
- Height: 1.65 m (5 ft 5 in)

Gymnastics career
- Discipline: Men's artistic gymnastics
- Country represented: Argentina (2009–present)
Medal record
Men's artistic gymnastics
Representing Argentina
Pan American Championships
Gold medal – first place	2012 Medellín	Horizontal bar
Silver medal – second place	2013 San Juan	Horizontal bar
South American Games
Silver medal – second place	2014 Santiago	Horizontal bar
Bronze medal – third place	2010 Medellín	Team
Bronze medal – third place	2014 Santiago	Team
Bronze medal – third place	2018 Cochabamba	Team
South American Championships
Silver medal – second place	2017 Cochabamba	Team
Silver medal – second place	2017 Cochabamba	Horizontal bar
Bronze medal – third place	2017 Cochabamba	Parallel bars

Nicolás Martín Córdoba (born November 20, 1989) is an Argentine male artistic gymnast, representing his nation in numerous international competitions. Cordoba qualified for the 2016 Summer Olympics, where he attained an eighteenth-place score of 14.800 on the horizontal bar in the qualifying phase of the tournament, failing to advance to the final.
