= Letícia Costa =

Brazilian artistic gymnast (born 1995)

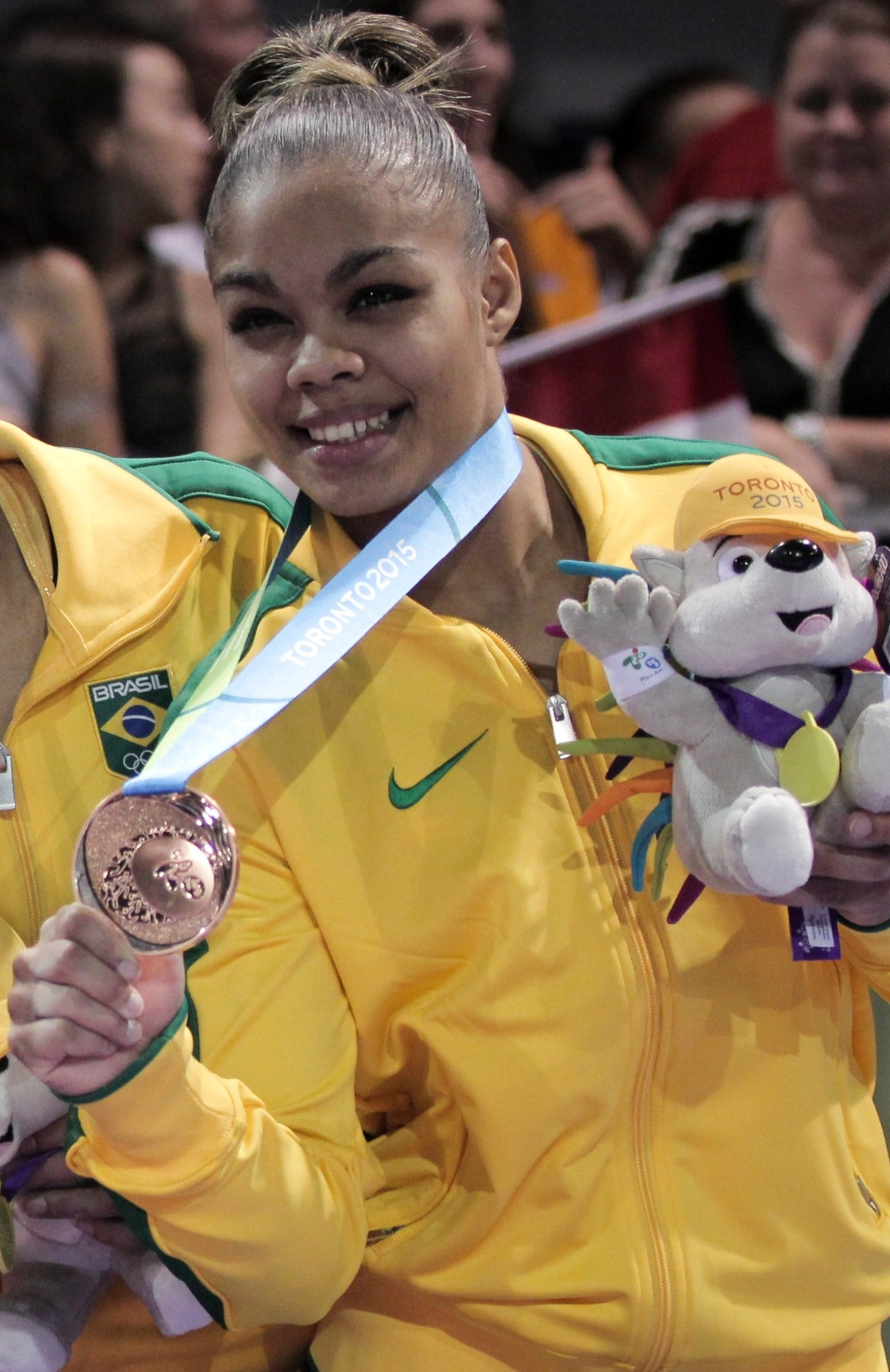
- Costa at the 2015 Pan American Games

Personal information
- Full name: Letícia Stephanie Lima da Costa
- Born: 20 April 1995 (age 31) Rio de Janeiro, Brazil
- Height: 153 cm (5 ft 0 in)

Gymnastics career
- Discipline: Women's artistic gymnastics
- Country represented: Brazil
- Club: Fluminense Gymnastics Club
- Head coach: Ricardo Batist
Medal record
Women's gymnastics
Representing Brazil
Pan American Games
| Bronze medal – third place | 2015 Toronto | Team |
Pan American Championships
| Silver medal – second place | 2013 San Juan | Vault |
| Silver medal – second place | 2014 Mississauga | Team |
| Silver medal – second place | 2016 Sucre | Vault |
South American Games
| Gold medal – first place | 2010 Medellín | Team |
| Silver medal – second place | 2010 Medellín | Vault |
South American Championships
| Gold medal – first place | 2013 Santiago | Team |
| Gold medal – first place | 2013 Santiago | Uneven bars |
| Gold medal – first place | 2015 Cali | Team |
| Gold medal – first place | 2015 Cali | Floor exercise |
| Silver medal – second place | 2012 Rosario | Team |
| Silver medal – second place | 2012 Rosario | Vault |
| Silver medal – second place | 2013 Santiago | All-around |
| Silver medal – second place | 2013 Santiago | Vault |
| Silver medal – second place | 2015 Cali | All-around |
| Bronze medal – third place | 2013 Santiago | Floor exercise |
| Bronze medal – third place | 2015 Cali | Balance beam |

Letícia Stephanie Lima da Costa (born 20 April 1995) is a Brazilian former artistic gymnast. She won a team bronze medal at the 2015 Pan American Games and is a two-time Pan American Championships vault silver medalist. She competed at four World Championships (2013–15, 2019).

== Gymnastics career ==
Costa began gymnastics when she was four years old. She won a bronze medal in the team competition at the 2009 Junior Pan American Championships in Aracaju. She then won a gold medal with the Brazilian team at the 2010 South American Games, where she also won the vault silver medal, behind Catalina Escobar.

Costa won silver medals with the team and on the vault at the 2012 South American Championships. She also won a silver medal on the vault at the 2013 Pan American Championships. She then competed at the 2013 World Championships and finished 28th in the all-around qualifications, making her the third reserve for the all-around final. After the World Championships, she won five medals at the 2013 South American Championships, including the uneven bars gold medal. At the 2014 Pan American Championships, she helped Brazil win the team silver medal. She was then selected to compete at the 2014 World Championships with the team that finished 16th in the qualification round.

Costa finished fourth in the vault final at the 2015 São Paulo World Cup. She then won a team gold medal at the 2015 South American Championships and also won the all-around silver medal, behind teammate Daniele Hypólito. At the 2015 Pan American Games, Costa fell on the floor exercise but still contributed toward Brazil's bronze medal win. Then at the 2015 World Championships, Costa and the Brazilian team placed ninth in the qualification round, around half of a point away from the team final and a direct Olympic berth. Brazil instead qualified for the 2016 Olympic Test Event.

Costa missed most of the 2016 season, including the 2016 Summer Olympics, due to multiple muscle injuries. At the end of the year, she won a silver medal on the vault at the 2016 Pan American Championships. She finished fourth in the all-around at the 2017 Brazilian Championships but was not selected for the World Championships team. She briefly retired from the sport but returned to training in 2018 after switching clubs. She competed at the 2019 World Championships where the Brazilian team only placed 14th due to various injuries and did not qualify as a team for the 2020 Olympic Games. The final competition of her career was the 2021 Brazilian Championships.
