= Marcela Sandoval =

Chilean politician

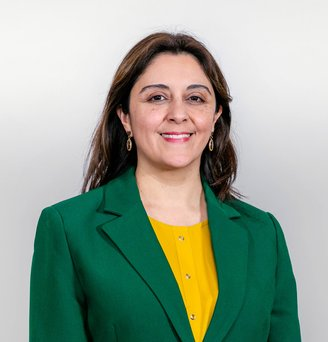

Minister of National Assets
- In office 16 August 2023 – 6 January 2025
- President: Gabriel Boric
- Preceded by: Javiera Toro Cáceres
- Succeeded by: Francisco Figueroa

Member of the Chamber of Deputies
- In office 2 March 2021 – 11 March 2022
- Preceded by: Renato Garín

Personal details
- Born: 9 February 1974 (age 52) Arica, Chile
- Party: Democratic Revolution
- Education: University of Santiago, Chile (Lic.) (MA); University of Chile (PgD)
- Occupation: Politician
- Profession: Journalist

Marcela Paz Alejandra Sandoval Osorio (born 9 February 1974) is a Chilean actress who served as Chile's Minister of National Assets from August 2023 to January 2025.

== Biography ==
She grew up in Graneros and completed her secondary education at Colegio Nuestra Señora de Graneros and at Sagrado Corazón School in Rancagua. She studied journalism at the University of Santiago, Chile (USACH), where she earned her professional degree, and later completed a master’s degree in Hispanic American Literature at the same institution.

She undertook postgraduate diploma programs in gender, culture and sexuality (2000–2001), as well as a diploma and postgraduate certification in qualitative methodologies for psychosocial research (2009–2010), both at the University of Chile. She also completed training in women’s rights and political participation in 2013 through the IVLP program, Women in Action.

In her professional career, she worked as a journalist for the Servicio de Salud Metropolitano del Ambiente between 1998 and 2003. From 2003 to 2007, she served as a researcher and later as head of advertising studies at the Servicio Nacional del Consumidor (SERNAC). In the field of human rights, she worked at the Human Rights Center of the University of Chile and at the National Institute of Human Rights (INDH). She later served as head of communications and institutional relations at the Museum of Memory and Human Rights between 2014 and 2017.

== Political career ==
She served as a leader within the College of Journalists of Chile and as a member of the Feminist Journalists Network. A member of Revolución Democrática, she held the position of national secretary between 2015 and 2016 and later served as vice president for the party's Central Macro Zone.

In the 2017 parliamentary elections, she ran as a candidate for the Chamber of Deputies of Chile in District 8 under the Broad Front coalition, but was not elected.

In December 2020, Deputy Renato Garín announced that he would resign from the Chamber of Deputies in order to run for the Constitutional Convention. Although Garín had resigned from Revolución Democrática in 2019, the parliamentary seat belonged to the party, which was therefore responsible for appointing his replacement. Internal consultations were held, in which Paz Gajardo emerged as the winner. Despite these results, the party's political council ultimately appointed Sandoval, who assumed office on 2 March 2021.

During her tenure as a deputy, she served on the Standing Committee on Labour and Social Security and was a member of the Joint Committee of Revolución Democrática, Comunes, Convergencia Social and independents. While serving as president of the Environment Committee, the Framework Law on Climate Change was approved.

In August 2023, she was appointed as Minister of National Assets. In January 2025, President Gabriel Boric removed her from office following controversy related to the government's plan to purchase the former residence of former president Salvador Allende.
