= Ayelén Tarabini =

Argentine artistic gymnast

- Born: 11 June 1992 (age 34) Argentina

Gymnastics career
- Discipline: Women's artistic gymnastics
- Country represented: Kyrgyzstan (2006–2020)
- Former countries represented: Argentina
Medal record
Women's Artistic Gymnastics
Representing Argentina
Pan American Championships
Bronze medal – third place	2008 Rosario	Vault
Pan American Sports Festival
Gold medal – first place	2014 Guadalajara	Balance beam
Silver medal – second place	2014 Guadalajara	All-around
Silver medal – second place	2014 Guadalajara	Floor exercise
Bronze medal – third place	2014 Guadalajara	Uneven bars
South American Games
Silver medal – second place	2006 Buenos Aires	Team
Silver medal – second place	2018 Cochabamba	Team
Bronze medal – third place	2010 Medellín	Vault
Bronze medal – third place	2010 Medellín	Balance beam
South American Championships
Gold medal – first place	2017 Cochabamba	Floor exercise
Silver medal – second place	2017 Cochabamba	Team
Silver medal – second place	2017 Cochabamba	Vault
Silver medal – second place	2017 Cochabamba	Balance beam
Bronze medal – third place	2009 Sogamoso	Team
Bronze medal – third place	2009 Sogamoso	Balance beam

Ayelén Tarabini (born 11 June 1992) is an Argentine artistic gymnast who represents Kyrgyzstan in international competition. She is the 2008 Pan American Championships bronze medalist on vault and the 2017 South American Championships gold medalist on floor exercise. She competed at five World Championships, but never participated at the Olympics in part due to injuries. Tarabini was a member of the Argentinian national gymnastics team from 2006 until 2020, when she retired from the sport.

== Gymnastics career ==
=== Junior: 1995–2007 ===
Tarabini began gymnastics at age three at Club Quilmes in Mar de Plata, Argentina. She became a national team member in 2006. At the 2006 South American Games, she won silver with the Argentine team.

=== Senior: 2008–2020 ===
==== 2008–2012 ====
Tarabini became a senior in 2008. That year she competed at the Pan American Championships and won bronze on vault.

Tarabini won team and balance beam bronze at the 2009 South American Championships. She participated at the 2009 World Championships in London, Great Britain.

Tarabini won bronze on vault and balance beam at the 2010 South American Games. She competed at the 2010 World Championships in Rotterdam, the Netherlands.

In 2011, she ruptured her left Achilles tendon, which meant she could not compete for eight months.

==== 2013–2016 ====
In 2013, Tarabini injured her left rotator cuff and required surgery, which sidelined her for three months.

In 2014, she competed at the Osijek World Cup in April and advanced to the vault final. Tarabini competed at the 2014 Pan American Sports Festival, winning balance beam gold, silver in all-around and floor exercise, and uneven bars bronze. At the Pan American Championships, held from 25 August to 1 September, she advanced to the balance beam event finals. A dislocated elbow prevented her from competing at the 2014 World Championships in Nanning, China.

In 2015, Tarabini participated at the Cottbus World Cup and Doha World Cup, both in March. From 3 to 5 April, she competed at the Ljubljana World Cup, where she won floor exercise bronze with a score of 13.500. In May, she competed at the Anadia World Cup, where she won silver on balance beam (13.475) and floor exercise (13.425). She competed at the Pan American Games in July. In October 2015, Tarabini competed at the World Championships in Glasgow, Scotland. During her floor routine, she ruptured her right Achilles tendon.

==== 2017–2020 ====
At the 2017 Argentinian Championships held from 28 June to 1 July, Tarabini won gold on vault and floor exercise, as well as silver on uneven bars and balance beam. She was the all-around champion. At the 2017 South American Championships held from 27 November to 4 December, Tarabini won floor exercise gold, as well as three silvers: in team, vault and balance beam.

At the 2018 South American Games in May, she won team silver. In September, she competed at the Pan American Championships. From 25 October to 3 November, Tarabini participated at the World Championships. On 17 November, she once again became all-around champion at the Argentinian Championships.

In May 2019, she tore her soleus muscle. By July, she was no longer injured, but was taken off the team for the upcoming Pan American Games. She competed at the Argentinian Championships at the end of August, and then competed at the World Championships in October.

In April 2020, Tarabini announced her retirement from gymnastics through a post on her social media. She claimed that she had been mistreated by national team staff, specifically head coach Roger Medina who had been appointed in 2019. She alleged that to keep her team membership, she was forced to train unsafely, with no regard for her prior injuries and the possibility of reinjuring her Achilles. She also said that after an argument with Medina, he took her off the team for the 2019 Pan American Games, and he said that he wanted a "young team"; and at the World Championships that year, the equipment she was training on was deliberately maladjusted by team coaches.

==== 2023–present: Switching allegiance to Kyrgyzstan ====
In November 2022, it was reported that Tarabini would switch allegiance to represent Kyrgyzstan in international competitions. This nationality change was finalised by the International Gymnastics Federation in May 2023.

== See also ==
- Nationality changes in gymnastics
