= Makarena Pinto =

Chilean artistic gymnast (born 1988)

- Full name: Makarena Daisy Pinto Adasme
- Born: August 15, 1988 (age 38)

Gymnastics career
- Country represented: Chile
Medal record
Representing Chile
Women's artistic gymnastics
South American Games
Gold medal – first place	2022 Asunción	Vault
Silver medal – second place	2014 Santiago	Team
Silver medal – second place	2014 Santiago	Floor exercise
Bronze medal – third place	2014 Santiago	All-around
Bronze medal – third place	2014 Santiago	Vault
South American Championships
Gold medal – first place	2026 Lima	Vault
Silver medal – second place	2011 Santiago	Vault
Silver medal – second place	2019 Santiago	Team
Bronze medal – third place	2011 Santiago	Team
Bronze medal – third place	2012 Rosario	Team
FIG World Cup
Event	1st	2nd	3rd
Apparatus World Cup	0	1	4
Total	0	1	4

Makarena Daisy Pinto Adasme (born August 15, 1988) is a Chilean artistic gymnast. She was the 2022 South American Games gold medalist on vault.

== Gymnastics career ==
Pinto has been competing internationally since 2006, when she competed at the World Gymnastics Championships in Aarhus, Denmark. She has also represented Chile at the 2011, 2013, 2023, and 2025 World Championships. Her best individual result at the World Championship level came in 2025, when she finished 20th on vault in qualifications.

Additionally, Pinto is a four-time competitor at the Pan American Games. She finished 15th on vault at the 2011 Pan American Games, and she qualified for the vault final at the 2015, 2019, and 2023 Pan American Games.

Pinto won the gold medal on vault at the 2022 South American Games, achieving this only nine months after returning from maternity leave. This was her fourth South American Games, after qualifying for the vault final at the 2006 and 2010 editions, and winning four medals at the 2014 edition. She once again qualified for the vault final at the 2026 South American Games, ultimately finishing fourth.

== Personal life ==
Pinto currently works as a physical education teacher after studying at Andrés Bello University. She is a mother of two.
