= Gymnastics at the 2011 Pan American Games – Women's artistic team all-around =

Women's artistic team all-around at the 2011 Pan American Games
- Venue: CODE II Gymnasium
- Dates: October 24
- Competitors: 32 from 8 nations

Medalists
| Gold medal | Bridgette Caquatto; Jessie DeZiel; Brandie Jay; Shawn Johnson; Grace McLaughlin; Bridget Sloan | United States |
| Silver medal | Kristina Vaculik; Peng-Peng Lee; Coralie Leblond-Chartrand; Mikaela Gerber; Dominique Pegg; Talia Chiarelli | Canada |
| Bronze medal | Elsa García; Marisela Cantú; Ana Lago; Karla Salazar; Yessenia Estrada; Alexa Moreno | Mexico |

The women's artistic team all-around competition of the gymnastics events at the 2011 Pan American Games in Guadalajara, Mexico, was held on October 24 at the Nissan Gymnastics Stadium. The defending champions were Ivana Hong, Shawn Johnson, Nastia Liukin, Samantha Peszek and Amber Trani from the United States.

== Results ==
| Rank | Team | Vault (gymnastics) | Uneven bars | Balance beam | Floor (gymnastics) | Total |
|---|---|---|---|---|---|---|
| 1st place, gold medalist(s) | United States | 59.200 (1) | 56.600 (1) | 52.625 (5) | 51.325 (3) | 219.750 |
| 1st place, gold medalist(s) | Bridgette Caquatto | 13.925 | 14.625 | 12.975 | 12.775 | 219.750 |
| 1st place, gold medalist(s) | Jessie DeZiel | 15.125 | | 13.275 | 13.150 | 219.750 |
| 1st place, gold medalist(s) | Brandie Jay | 14.925 | 13.725 | 13.125 | 12.375 | 219.750 |
| 1st place, gold medalist(s) | Shawn Johnson | 14.925 | 14.400 | 12.875 | | 219.750 |
| 1st place, gold medalist(s) | Grace McLaughlin | 14.225 | 13.350 | 13.250 | 11.675 | 219.750 |
| 1st place, gold medalist(s) | Bridget Sloan | | 13.850 | | 13.025 | 219.750 |
| 2nd place, silver medalist(s) | Canada | 56.050 (4) | 51.425 (4) | 55.175 (1) | 54.800 (1) | 217.450 |
| 2nd place, silver medalist(s) | Talia Chiarelli | 14.225 | 11.150 | 13.675 | 13.575 | 217.450 |
| 2nd place, silver medalist(s) | Mikaela Gerber | 13.700 | 11.950 | 13.550 | 13.950 | 217.450 |
| 2nd place, silver medalist(s) | Coralie Leblond-Chartrand | 14.100 | 12.475 | 12.475 | 13.025 | 217.450 |
| 2nd place, silver medalist(s) | Christine Peng-Peng Lee | 13.875 | 14.275 | 13.675 | 13.500 | 217.450 |
| 2nd place, silver medalist(s) | Dominique Pegg | | | | | 217.450 |
| 2nd place, silver medalist(s) | Kristina Vaculik | 13.850 | 12.725 | 14.275 | 13.775 | 217.450 |
| 3rd place, bronze medalist(s) | Mexico | 56.400 (2) | 52.975 (2) | 53.075 (4) | 51.875 (2) | 214.325 |
| 3rd place, bronze medalist(s) | Marisela Cantú | 13.425 | 13.650 | 13.450 | 12.675 | 214.325 |
| 3rd place, bronze medalist(s) | Yessenia Estrada | 14.300 | 11.475 | 13.600 | 12.100 | 214.325 |
| 3rd place, bronze medalist(s) | Elsa García | 14.125 | 13.500 | 11.950 | 13.300 | 214.325 |
| 3rd place, bronze medalist(s) | Ana Lago | 14.050 | 13.150 | 11.675 | 13.800 | 214.325 |
| 3rd place, bronze medalist(s) | Alexa Moreno | | | | | 214.325 |
| 3rd place, bronze medalist(s) | Karla Salazar | 13.925 | 12.675 | 14.075 | 12.050 | 214.325 |
| 4 | Colombia | 55.625 (5) | 52.450 (3) | 51.250 (6) | 50.650 (5) | 209.975 |
| 4 | Yurany Avendaño | | 13.200 | 12.350 | | 209.975 |
| 4 | Catalina Escobar | 15.075 | 11.800 | 12.400 | 13.075 | 209.975 |
| 4 | Jessica Gil | 14.075 | 12.400 | 13.600 | 12.800 | 209.975 |
| 4 | Gabriela Gómez | 12.800 | | 10.600 | 12.275 | 209.975 |
| 4 | Nathalia Sánchez | 12.425 | 13.250 | 12.900 | 11.825 | 209.975 |
| 4 | Bibiana Vélez | 13.675 | 13.600 | | 12.500 | 209.975 |
| 5 | Brazil | 56.175 (3) | 48.900 (5) | 53.425 (3) | 51.325 (3) | 209.825 |
| 5 | Adrian Gomes | 14.225 | 11.900 | 13.050 | 12.475 | 209.825 |
| 5 | Priscila Cobello | | 11.100 | 13.500 | 12.550 | 209.825 |
| 5 | Daiane Dos Santos | 14.125 | 12.150 | | 12.625 | 209.825 |
| 5 | Gabriela Soares | 13.600 | | 11.850 | | 209.825 |
| 5 | Bruna Leal | 13.800 | 12.650 | 13.375 | 12.775 | 209.825 |
| 5 | Daniele Hypólito | 14.025 | 12.200 | 13.500 | 13.375 | 209.825 |
| 6 | Venezuela | 54.675 (7) | 48.750 (6) | 53.600 (2) | 49.600 (7) | 206.625 |
| 6 | Fanny Briceño | 13.525 | 10.675 | 13.525 | 12.175 | 206.625 |
| 6 | Eliana Gonzalez | | | | | 206.625 |
| 6 | Yarimar Medina | 13.625 | 12.325 | 12.050 | 12.175 | 206.625 |
| 6 | Maciel Peña | 13.825 | 11.400 | 13.275 | 13.050 | 206.625 |
| 6 | Ivet Rojas | 13.700 | 13.200 | 13.475 | 12.200 | 206.625 |
| 6 | Johanny Sotillo | 13.025 | 11.825 | 13.325 | | 206.625 |
| 7 | Cuba | 55.475 (6) | 46.000 (7) | 49.800 (7) | 50.600 (6) | 201.875 |
| 7 | Yaney Hernández | 13.375 | 11.650 | 12.850 | 12.225 | 201.875 |
| 7 | Dayana Rodríguez | 13.975 | 11.775 | 12.700 | 12.725 | 201.875 |
| 7 | Yahajara Sese | 13.950 | 10.525 | 12.275 | 12.150 | 201.875 |
| 7 | Dovélis Torres | 14.175 | 12.050 | 11.975 | 13.500 | 201.875 |
| 8 | Argentina | 52.600 (8) | 43.675 (8) | 47.100 (8) | 49.150 (8) | 192.525 |
| 8 | Agustina Estarli | 12.425 | 11.725 | 10.800 | 12.150 | 192.525 |
| 8 | Lucila Estarli | 13.725 | 10.475 | 12.625 | 12.375 | 192.525 |
| 8 | Merlina Galera | 13.400 | 10.675 | 12.525 | 13.025 | 192.525 |
| 8 | Belen Stoffel | 13.050 | 10.800 | 11.150 | 11.600 | 192.525 |
