= List of Olympic female artistic gymnasts for Brazil =

Gymnastics events have been staged at the Olympic Games since 1896. Brazilian female artistic gymnasts have participated in every Summer Olympics since 1980, except for 1996, when Soraya Carvalho qualified but had to withdraw before the start of the competition due to an ankle injury. A total of 17 female gymnasts have represented Brazil. At the 2020 Tokyo Olympic Games, Rebeca Andrade won gold in the vault and silver in the individual all-around.

== Gymnasts ==
=== Summer Olympics ===
Gymnast	Years	Ref.
Cláudia Costa	1980	
Tatiana Figueiredo	1984	
Luísa Ribeiro	1988, 1992	
Camila Comin	2000, 2004	
Daniele Hypólito	2000, 2004, 2008, 2012, 2016	
Ana Paula Rodrigues	2004	
Laís Souza	2004, 2008	
Daiane dos Santos	2004, 2008, 2012	
Caroline Molinari	2004	
Jade Barbosa	2008, 2016, 2024	
Ana Cláudia Silva	2008	
Ethiene Franco	2008, 2012	
Bruna Leal	2012	
Harumy de Freitas	2012	
Rebeca Andrade	2016, 2020, 2024	
Lorrane Oliveira	2016, 2024	
Flávia Saraiva	2016, 2020, 2024	
Júlia Soares	2024	

=== Youth Olympic Games ===
Gymnast	Years	Ref.
Harumy Freitas	2010	
Flávia Saraiva	2014	
Laura Rocha	2018	
Julie Costa	2026	

== Decorated gymnasts ==
=== Summer Olympics ===
Gymnast	Team	AA	VT	UB	BB	FX	Total
Rebeca Andrade	2024	2020; 2024	2020; 2024			2024	6
Jade Barbosa	2024						1
Lorrane Oliveira	2024						1
Flávia Saraiva	2024						1
Júlia Soares	2024						1

=== Youth Olympic Games ===
Gymnast	AA	VT	UB	BB	FX	Total
Flávia Saraiva	2014			2014	2014	3

== Gallery ==
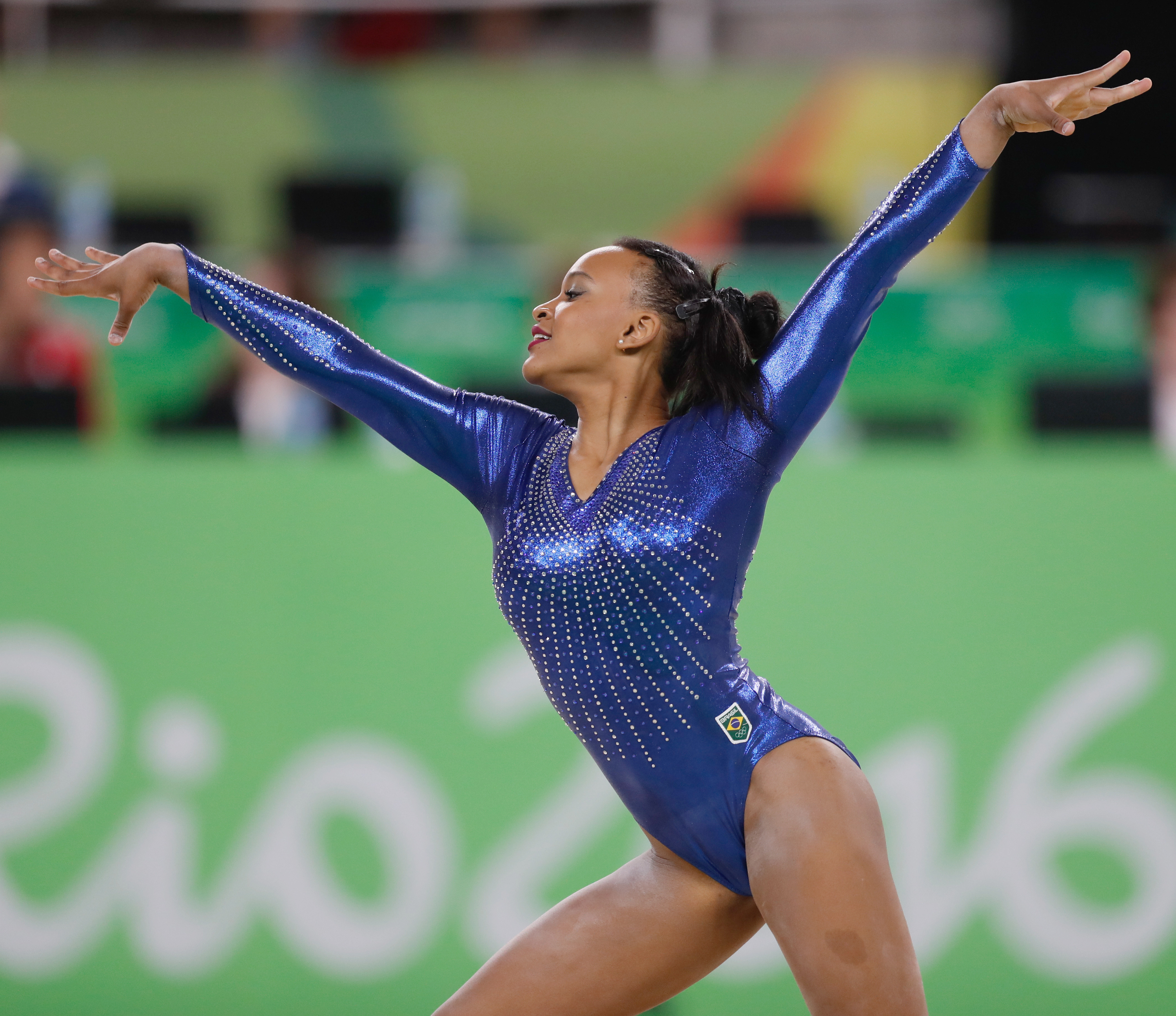
Rebeca Andrade

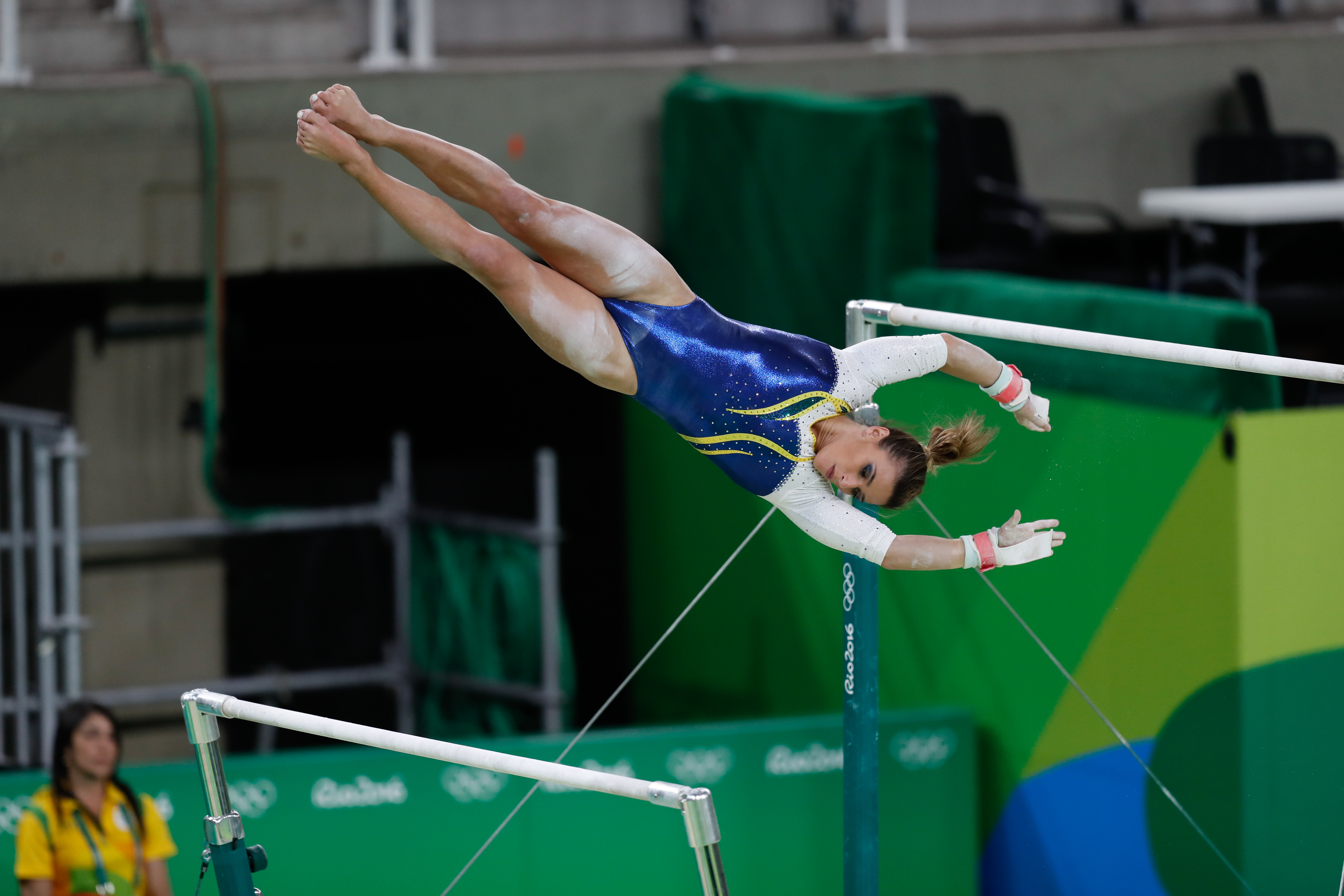
Jade Barbosa

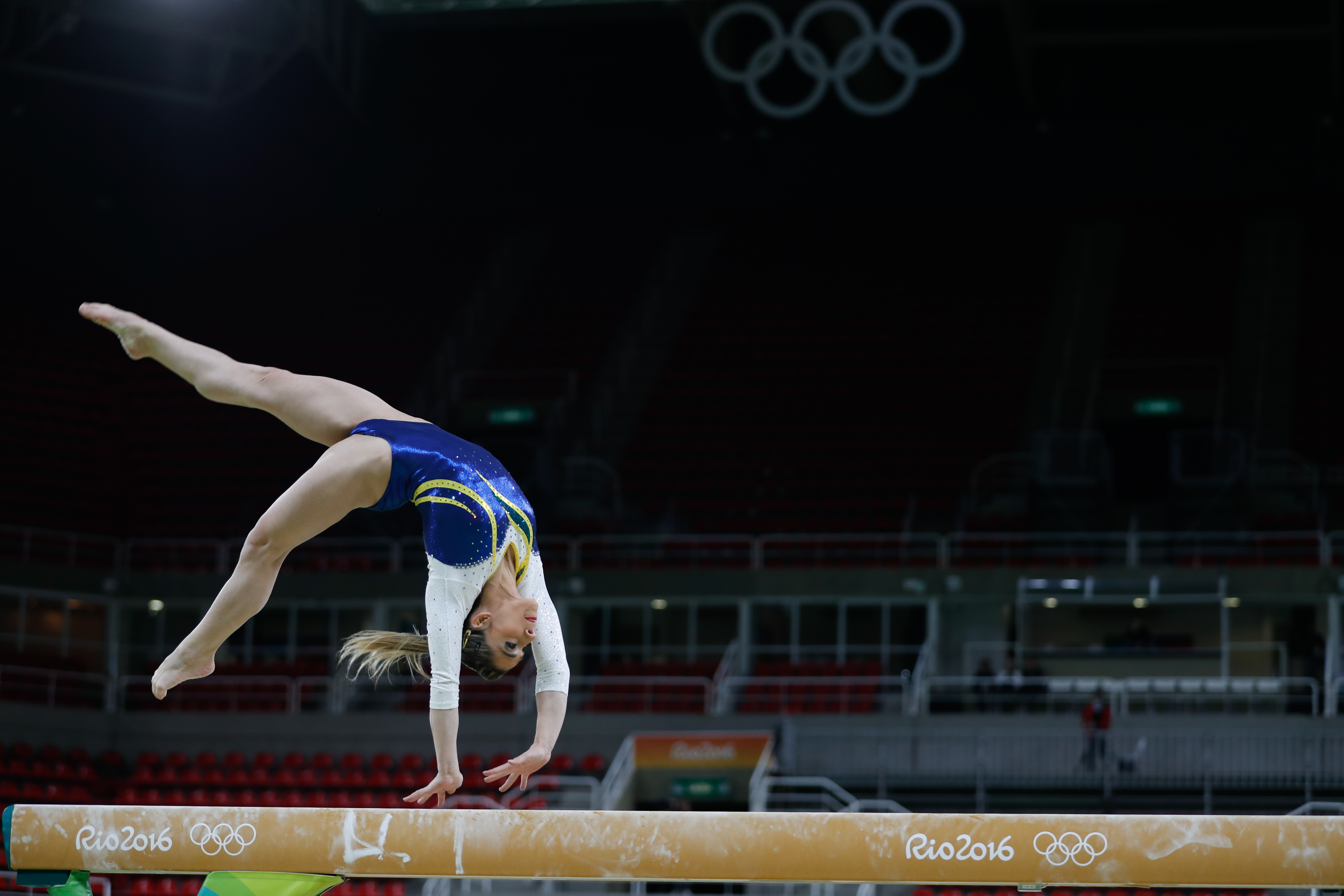
Daniele Hypólito

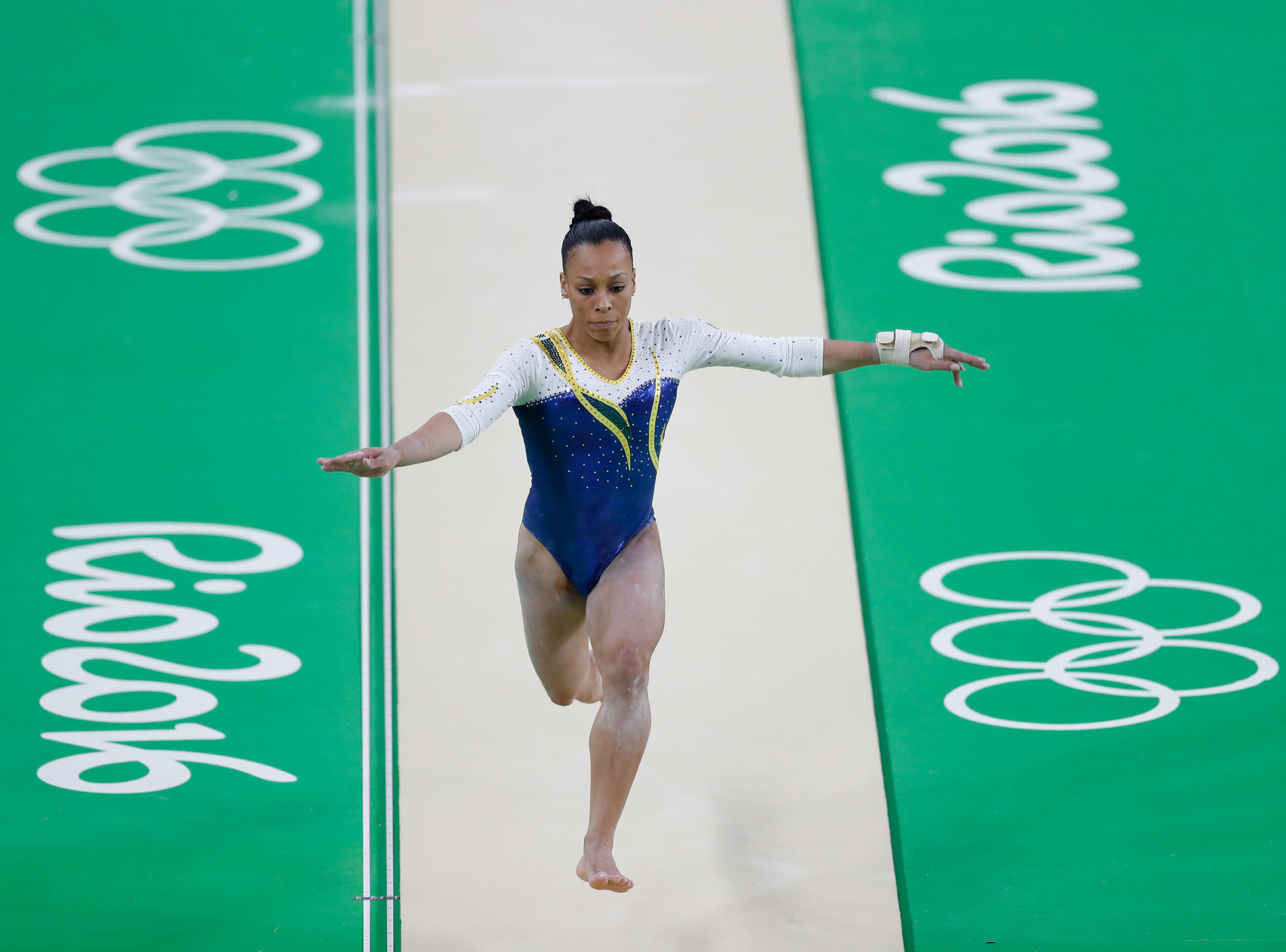
Lorrane Oliveira

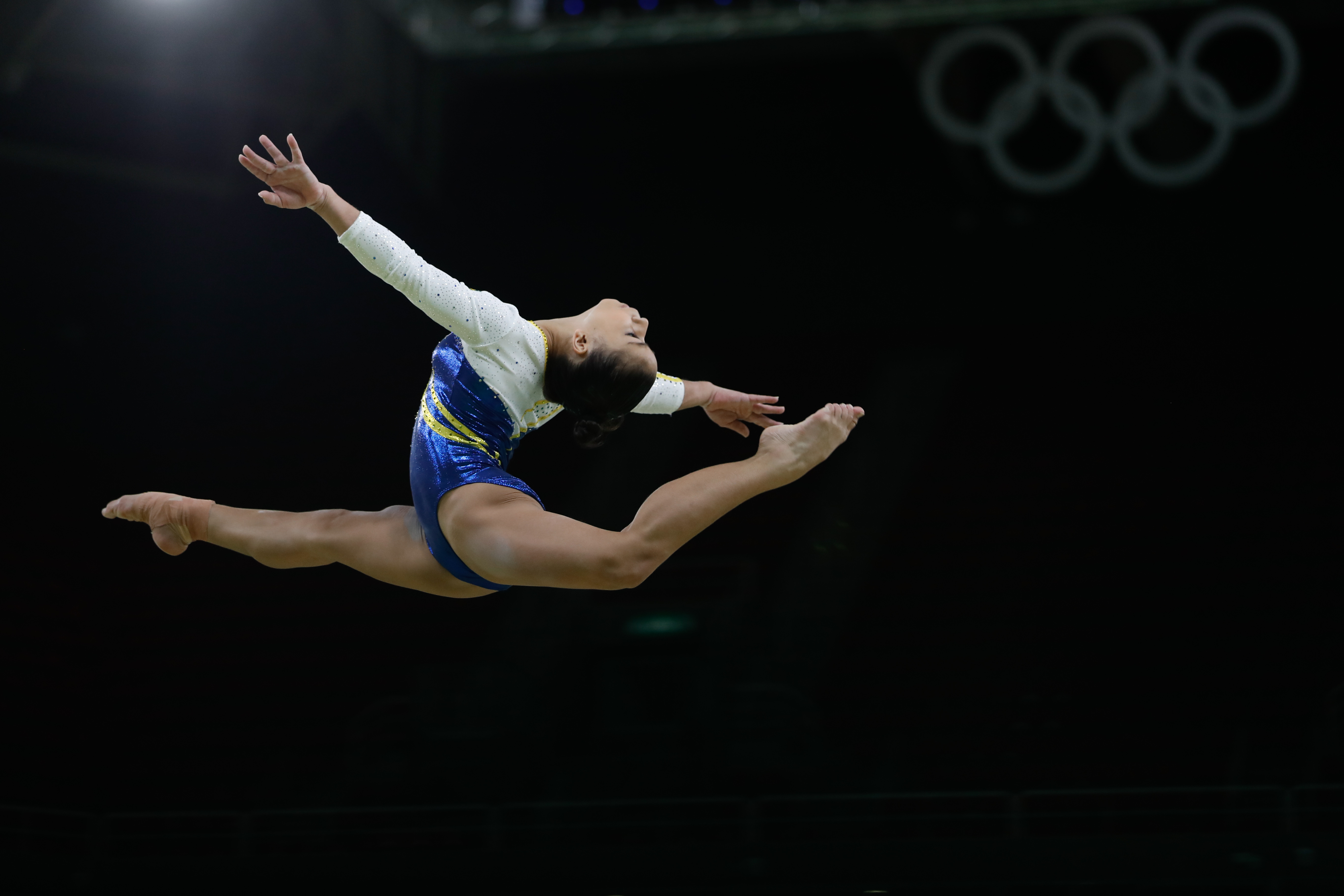
Flávia Saraiva

Brazilian women at the 2016 Olympic Games

== See also ==
- Brazil women's national gymnastics team
- List of Olympic male artistic gymnasts for Brazil
