= Brazilian Artistic Gymnastics Championships =

The Brazilian Artistic Gymnastics Championships (Portuguese: Campeonato Brasileiro de Ginástica Artística) are the highest-level individual competition in artistic gymnastics in Brazil. The first edition was held in 1951. The championships are organized by the Brazilian Gymnastics Federation (CBG) and include men's and women's competitions in standard gymnastics disciplines. All gymnasts, with no distinction between juniors and seniors, take part in a meet comprising teams events for every gender, as well as an individual all-around competition and individual event finals for each apparatus. A different event, named Troféu Brasil (Brazil's Trophy), only features individual apparatus event finals.

== Individual all-around winners ==
Year	Location	Men	Women	Ref.
1951	(São Paulo (state)) São Paulo	Hugo Guetschow	—N/a	
1953	(Rio Grande do Sul) Porto Alegre	Arno Tesche (1)	Nilda Rosa (1)	
1955	(Rio de Janeiro (state)) Rio de Janeiro	Arno Tesche (2)	Nilda Rosa (2)	
1958	(São Paulo (state)) São Paulo	Arno Tesche (3)	Frida Heinrichs (1)	
1959	(Rio Grande do Sul) Porto Alegre	Siegfried Fischer	Frida Heinrichs (2)	
1965	(Rio de Janeiro (state)) Rio de Janeiro	Mário Carvalho	Aparecida Pery	
1967	(São Paulo (state)) São Paulo	Marcelino Pinent	Eneida Levenson (1)	
1969	(Rio Grande do Sul) Porto Alegre	Jairo Brandão (1)	Silvia Pinent	
1971	(Minas Gerais) Belo Horizonte	Nilson Olsson	Eneida Flecha (2)	
1972	(Rio Grande do Sul) Porto Alegre	Jairo Brandão (2)	Rosanne Biedermann	
1973	(São Paulo (state)) São Paulo	José Abramides	Clotilde Tonial	
1974	(Rio de Janeiro (state)) Rio de Janeiro	Luiz Schick (1)	Gisele Radomsky (1)	
1975	(Rio Grande do Sul) Porto Alegre	Luiz Schick (2)	Gisele Radomsky (2)	
1976	(São Paulo (state)) São Paulo	Luiz Schick (3)	Sílvia Pacheco	
1977	(Rio Grande do Sul) Porto Alegre	Clotário Neto	Sílvia dos Anjos	
1978	(São Paulo (state)) São Paulo	João Luís Ribeiro	Lilian Carrascoza	
1980	(Minas Gerais) Belo Horizonte	João Machado	Altair Prado (1)	
1981	(São Paulo (state)) São Paulo	João Ruhs	Altair Prado (2)	
1982	(Minas Gerais) Belo Horizonte	Hélio Araújo	Jacqueline Pires (1)	
1984	(São Paulo (state)) São Paulo	Carlos Fulcher (1)	Vanda Oliveira	
1985	(Federal District (Brazil)) Brasília	Carlos Fulcher (2)	Jacqueline Pires (2) Luísa Ribeiro (1)	
1986	(Rio de Janeiro (state)) Rio de Janeiro	Carlos Fulcher (3)	Luísa Ribeiro (2)	
1987	(São Paulo (state)) Rio Claro	Gerson Gnoatto	Luísa Ribeiro (3)	
1988	(Rio Grande do Sul) Porto Alegre	Guilherme Pinto	Luísa Ribeiro (4)	
1992	(Rio de Janeiro (state)) Rio de Janeiro	Marco Monteiro (1)	Silvia Mendes	
1993	(Santa Catarina (state)) Blumenau	Marco Monteiro (2)	Soraya Carvalho	
1994	(Rio Grande do Sul) Porto Alegre	José Barbuto	Graziella Guerra (1)	
1995	(Paraná (state)) Curitiba	Marco Monteiro (3)	Graziella Guerra (2)	
1997	(Rio de Janeiro (state)) Rio de Janeiro	Fabrício Olsson	Daniele Hypólito (1)	
1998	(Rio Grande do Sul) Porto Alegre	Gustavo Barreto	Daiane dos Santos	
1999	(Rio Grande do Sul) Porto Alegre	Mosiah Rodrigues (1)	Heine Araújo	
2000	(Rio de Janeiro (state)) Rio de Janeiro	Mosiah Rodrigues (2)	Daniele Hypólito (2)	
2001	(Santa Catarina (state)) São Bento do Sul	Michel Conceição (1)	Daniele Hypólito (3)	
2002	(Paraná (state)) Curitiba	Danilo Nogueira (1)	Daniele Hypólito (4)	
2003	(Rio de Janeiro (state)) Rio de Janeiro	Danilo Nogueira (2)	Daniele Hypólito (5)	
2004	(Rio Grande do Sul) Porto Alegre	Mosiah Rodrigues (3)	Ana Paula Rodrigues	
2005	(Pará) Belém	Danilo Nogueira (3) Victor Rosa (1)	Daniele Hypólito (6)	
2006	(Goiás) Goiânia	Michel Conceição (2)	Daniele Hypólito (7)	
2007	(Paraná (state)) Curitiba	Victor Rosa (2)	Jade Barbosa (1)	
2008	(Alagoas) Maceió	Diego Hypólito (1)	Ana Cláudia Silva	
2009	(Rio Grande do Sul) Porto Alegre	Victor Rosa (3)	Bruna Leal	
2010	(Espírito Santo) Vitória	Diego Hypólito (2)	Daniele Hypólito (8)	
2011	(São Paulo (state)) Guarulhos	Francisco Barretto (1)	Daniele Hypólito (9)	
2012	(Goiás) Goiânia	Sérgio Sasaki	Jade Barbosa (2)	
2013	(Espírito Santo) Vitória	Francisco Barretto (2)	Daniele Hypólito (10)	
2014	(Sergipe) Aracaju	Francisco Barretto (3)	Daniele Hypólito (11)	
2015	(Minas Gerais) Belo Horizonte	Arthur Mariano	Lorrane Oliveira	
2016	(São Paulo (state)) São Paulo	Caio Souza (1)	Rebeca Andrade (1)	
2017	(São Paulo (state)) São Paulo	Caio Souza (2)	Thais Fidelis (1)	
2018	(São Paulo (state)) São Bernardo do Campo and (São Paulo (state)) Santos	Francisco Barretto (4)	Jade Barbosa (3)	
2019	(Rio de Janeiro (state)) Rio de Janeiro and (São Paulo (state)) Praia Grande	Lucas Bitencourt	Thais Fidelis (2)	
2021	(Sergipe) Aracaju	Caio Souza (3)	Rebeca Andrade (2)	
2022	(Bahia) Lauro de Freitas	Caio Souza (4)	Rebeca Andrade (3)	
2023	(Bahia) Lauro de Freitas	Yuri Guimarães	Jade Barbosa (4)	
2024	(Paraíba) João Pessoa	Caio Souza (5)	Júlia Soares	
2025	(Pernambuco) Recife	Caio Souza (6)	Sophia Weisberg	
2026	(Federal District (Brazil)) Brasília	Vitaliy Guimaraes	Flávia Saraiva	
