= Brazilian Gymnastics Federation =

National governing body for gymnastics in Brazil

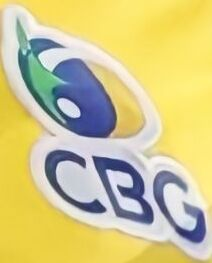
- Abbreviation: CBG
- Formation: 25 November 1978
- Purpose: Sport governing body
- Location: Aracaju, Sergipe (Brazil)
- Parent organization: International Gymnastics Federation
- Website: www.cbginastica.com.br/

The Brazilian Gymnastics Federation (Portuguese: Confederação Brasileira de Ginástica) is the national governing body for gymnastics in Brazil. The federation was founded on November 25, 1978.

== International competition ==
The Brazilian Gymnastics Federation (CBG) is a member of the Pan American umbrella organization Pan American Gymnastics Union (UPAG/PAGU), the South American umbrella organization Confederación Sudamericana de Gimnasia (CONSUGI), as well as the main governing body of the sport, the International Gymnastics Federation (FIG).

== Olympics ==
Last updated after the 2024 Summer Olympics

Year	Medal	Name	Event
2012	Gold	Arthur Zanetti	Men's rings
2016	Silver	Arthur Zanetti	Men's rings
2016	Silver	Diego Hypólito	Men's floor
2016	Bronze	Arthur Mariano	Men's floor
2020	Gold	Rebeca Andrade	Women's vault
2020	Silver	Rebeca Andrade	Women's artistic individual all-around
2024	Gold	Rebeca Andrade	Women's floor
2024	Silver	Rebeca Andrade	Women's artistic individual all-around
2024	Silver	Rebeca Andrade	Women's vault
2024	Bronze	Rebeca Andrade; Jade Barbosa; Lorrane Oliveira; Flávia Saraiva; Júlia Soares	Women's artistic team all-around

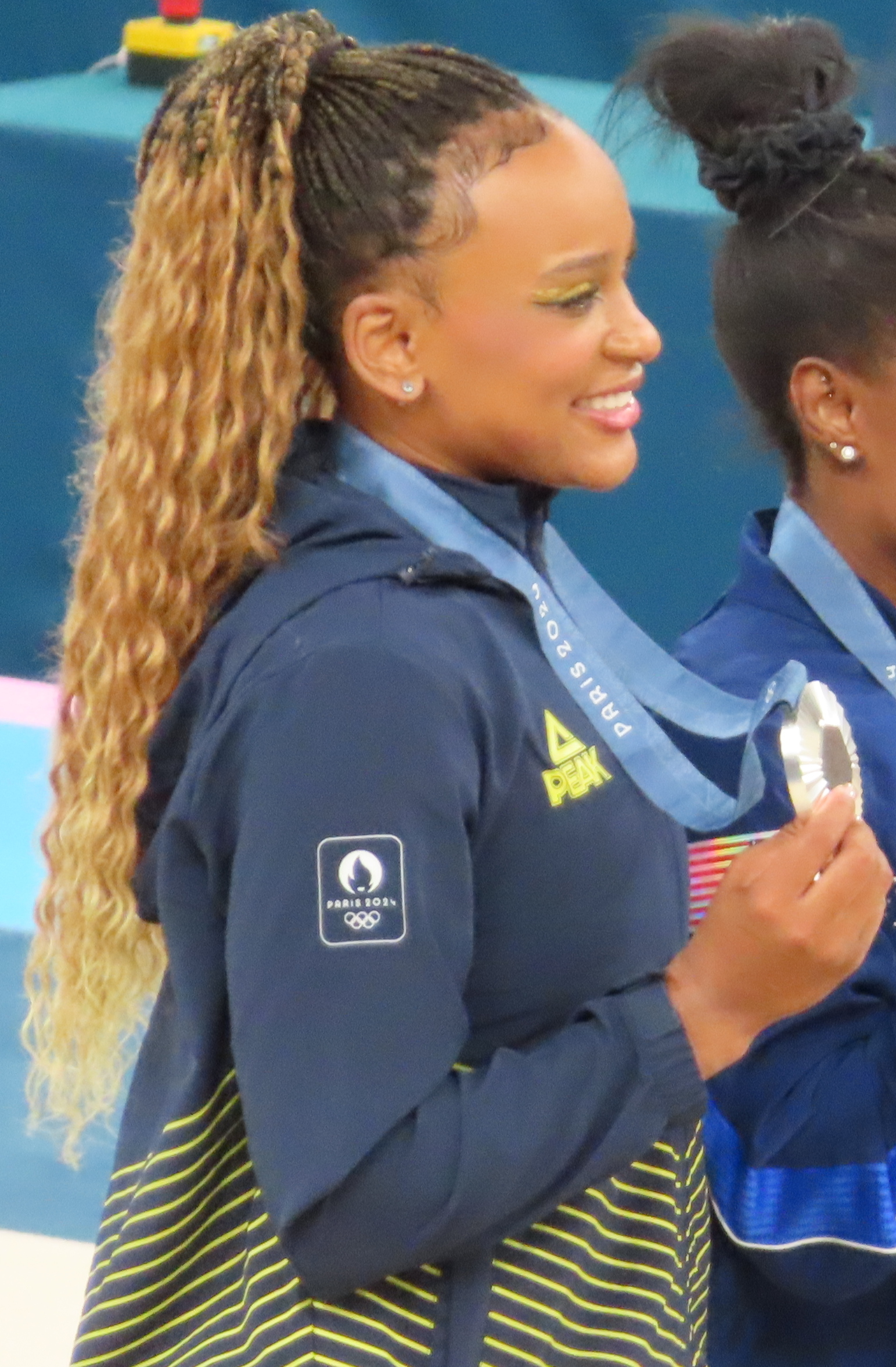
Rebeca Andrade, the most successful Brazilian in Olympic gymnastics history

== See also ==
- Brazil at the World Artistic Gymnastics Championships
- Brazil women's national gymnastics team
- Brazilian Artistic Gymnastics Championships
- List of Olympic female artistic gymnasts for Brazil
- List of Olympic rhythmic gymnasts for Brazil
