= Ana Cláudia Silva (gymnast) =

Brazilian artistic gymnast (born 1992)

- Full name: Ana Cláudia Trindade Araújo da Silva
- Born: 28 April 1992 (age 34) Natal, Rio Grande do Norte, Brazil
- Height: 1.50 m (4 ft 11 in)

Gymnastics career
- Discipline: Women's artistic gymnastics
- Country represented: Brazil
- Club: APCEF
- Head coach: Iryna Ilyashenko
- Choreographer: Keli Kitaura
Medal record
Women's artistic gymnastics
Representing Brazil
Pan American Games
| Silver medal – second place | 2007 Rio de Janeiro | Team |
South American Games
| Gold medal – first place | 2006 Buenos Aires | Team |
| Gold medal – first place | 2010 Medellín | Team |
| Silver medal – second place | 2006 Buenos Aires | Uneven bars |
South American Championships
| Gold medal – first place | 2009 Sogamoso | Team |
| Silver medal – second place | 2009 Sogamoso | All-around |
| Silver medal – second place | 2009 Sogamoso | Balance beam |
| Silver medal – second place | 2009 Sogamoso | Floor exercise |
| Event | 1st | 2nd | 3rd |
|---|---|---|---|
| FIG World Cup | 0 | 1 | 0 |
| Total | 0 | 1 | 0 |

Ana Cláudia Trindade Araújo da Silva (born 28 April 1992) is a Brazilian former artistic gymnast. She represented Brazil at the 2008 Summer Olympics and finished 22nd in the individual all-around final. She won a silver medal with the Brazilian team at the 2007 Pan American Games and won team gold medals at the 2006 and 2010 South American Games.

== Gymnastics career ==
Silva competed alongside Jade Barbosa, Khiuani Dias, and Ethiene Franco at the 2006 Junior Pan American Championships, and they won the silver medal behind the United States. She then helped Brazil win the team title at the 2006 South American Games. Individually, she won a silver medal on the uneven bars.

Silva represented Brazil at the 2007 Pan American Games and helped the team win the silver medal. She qualified for the uneven bars final and finished sixth. She then competed with the Brazilian team that finished fifth at the 2007 World Championships.

Silva won the all-around title at the 2008 Brazilian Championships. She was selected to represent Brazil at the 2008 Summer Olympics alongside Jade Barbosa, Ethiene Franco, Laís Souza, Daniele Hypólito, and Daiane dos Santos. The team advanced to the team final, where Silva competed on the floor exercise to help the team finish eighth. Individually, she finished 22nd in the all-around final.

Silva won a silver medal on the balance beam at the 2009 Maribor World Cup. She did not compete at the 2009 World Championships due to an elbow injury. She returned to training in time for the 2009 South American Championships and helped the Brazilian team win gold. Individually, she won the silver medals in the all-around, balance beam, and floor exercise–all behind teammate Priscila Domingues Cobello.

Silva won a gold medal with the Brazilian team at the 2010 South American Games.
