= 2000 Junior Pan American Artistic Gymnastics Championships =

International sports competition

Junior Pan American Artistic Gymnastics Championships
- Location: Curitiba, Brazil
- Date: November 25–26, 2000

The 2000 Junior Pan American Artistic Gymnastics Championships was held in Curitiba, Brazil, November 25–26, 2000.

== Medal summary ==
Event	Gold	Silver	Bronze
Women
Team	United States; Maria Scaffidi; Susan Jackson; Lisa Colwell; Ashley Miles	Argentina; Celeste Carnevale; Gabriela Parigi; Daniela Conde; Cecilia Stancato	Brazil; Ana Paula Rodrigues; Coral Borda; Jessica Marinho; Caroline Molinari
All Around	Maria Scaffidi (USA)	Celeste Carnevale (ARG)	Susan Jackson (USA)
Vault	Ashley Miles (USA)	Celeste Carnevale (ARG)	Susan Jackson (USA)
Uneven bars	Lisa Colwell (USA)	Melissa Cesar (VEN)	Ashley Miles (USA)
Balance beam	Maria Scaffidi (USA)	Ana Paula Rodrigues (BRA)	Lisa Colwell (USA)
Floor exercise	Celeste Carnevale (ARG)	Susan Jackson (USA)	Ashley Miles (USA)
Men
Team	United States; DJ Bucher; Sho Nakamori; Adam Pummer; Andre Hernandez	Brazil; Michel Conceição; Danilo Nogueira; Paulo Marcio Silva; Victor Camargo	Venezuela; Jhonny Parra; José Luis Fuentes; David Dominguez; Pablo Narvaez
All Around	Luis Vargas (PUR)	Sho Nakamori (USA)	DJ Bucher (USA)
Floor exercise	Andre Hernandez (USA)	Tomás González (CHI)	Michel Conceição (BRA)
Pommel horse	Luis Vargas (PUR)	Sho Nakamori (USA)	Victor Camargo (BRA)
Rings	DJ Bucher (USA)	Danilo Nogueira (BRA)	Sho Nakamori (USA)
Vault	Michel Conceição (BRA)	Victor Camargo (BRA)	Adam Pummer (USA)
Parallel bars	Luis Vargas (PUR)	Jesus Romero (COL)	DJ Bucher (USA)
Horizontal bar	Jesus Romero (COL) Luis Vargas (PUR)	—	Jhonny Parra (VEN) Andre Hernandez (USA)

== Medal table ==
Rank	Nation	Gold	Silver	Bronze	Total
1	United States	8	3	10	21
2	Puerto Rico	4	0	0	4
3	Brazil	1	4	3	8
4	Argentina	1	3	0	4
5	Colombia	1	1	0	2
6	Venezuela	0	1	2	3
7	Chile	0	1	0	1
Totals (7 entries)		15	13	15	43
