= Brazil women's national artistic gymnastics team =

Brazil
- Continental union: Pan-American Gymnastics Union
- National federation: Brazilian Gymnastics Federation

Olympic Games
- Appearances: 5
- Medals: Bronze: 2024

World Championships
- Appearances: 23
- Medals: Silver: 2023

Pan American Games
- Medals: Silver: 2007, 2023; Bronze: 1983, 1999, 2003, 2015, 2019

Pan American Championships
- Medals: Gold: 1997, 2021, 2022, 2024; Silver: 2001, 2005, 2014, 2018, 2026; Bronze: 2010, 2025

The Brazil women's national artistic gymnastics team represents Brazil in World Gymnastics international competitions.

== History ==
Brazil has participated in the Olympic Games women's team competition four times. It has also participated in the women's team competition at the World Artistic Gymnastics Championships 18 times. At the 2020 Olympic Games, Rebeca Andrade became the first Brazilian to win an Olympic medal in women's artistic gymnastics, winning silver in the individual all-around.

== Current roster ==
As of January 19, 2026:

Name	Birthdate and age	Birthplace	Club
Ana Luiza Lima	August 8, 2005 (age 21)	Telêmaco Borba	Minas Tênis Clube
Andreza Lima	May 22, 2007 (age 19)	São Paulo	Grêmio Náutico União
Carolyne Pedro	July 6, 2000 (age 26)	Curitiba	CEGIN
Flávia Saraiva	September 30, 1999 (age 27)	Rio de Janeiro	Flamengo
Gabriela Barbosa	December 8, 2007 (age 18)	São Paulo	Pinheiros
Hellen Silva	2008	Rio de Janeiro	Flamengo
Jade Barbosa	July 1, 1991 (age 35)	Rio de Janeiro	Flamengo
Júlia Soares	August 23, 2005 (age 21)	Curitiba	Pinheiros
Julia Coutinho	November 22, 2009 (age 17)		Flamengo
Lorrane Oliveira	April 13, 1998 (age 28)	Curitiba	Flamengo
Rebeca Andrade	May 8, 1999 (age 27)	Guarulhos	Flamengo
Sophia Weisberg	December 11, 2009 (age 16)	Araras	Pinheiros
Thaís Fidélis	July 23, 2001 (age 25)	Ribeirão Preto	SESI

== Team competition results ==
=== Olympic Games ===
Year	Position	Squad
1928 through 2000 — did not participate
2004	9th place	Camila Comin, Daniele Hypólito, Caroline Molinari, Ana Paula Rodrigues, Daiane dos Santos, Laís Souza
2008	8th place	Jade Barbosa, Ethiene Franco, Daniele Hypólito, Daiane dos Santos, Ana Cláudia Silva, Laís Souza
2012	12th place	Daniele Hypólito, Ethiene Franco, Harumy de Freitas, Bruna Leal, Daiane dos Santos
2016	8th place	Daniele Hypólito, Jade Barbosa, Rebeca Andrade, Flávia Saraiva, Lorrane Oliveira
2020	DNQ	did not qualify a full team
2024	Bronze medal	Rebeca Andrade, Jade Barbosa, Lorrane Oliveira, Flávia Saraiva, Júlia Soares

=== World Championships ===
Year	Position	Squad
1934 through 1974 — did not participate
1978	19th place	
1979	23rd place	Silvia dos Anjos, Lilian Carrascoza, Marian Fernandes, Cláudia Magalhaes, Jacqueline Pires, Altair Prado
1981	19th place	Danilce Campos, Lilian Carrascoza, Carine Leao, Cláudia Magalhaes, Jacqueline Pires, Altair Prado
1983	22nd place	Danilce Campos, Marian Fernandes, Tatiana Figueiredo, Cláudia Magalhaes, Jacqueline Pires, Altair Prado
1985	20th place	Marian Fernandes, Tatiana Figueiredo, Elena Fournogerakis, Vanda Oliveira, Jacqueline Pires, Altair Prado
1987	21st place	Marian Fernandes, Tatiana Figueiredo, Vanda Oliveira, Luisa Parente, Priscilla Steinberger, Margaret Yada
1989	22nd place	Adriane Andrade, Anna Fernandes, Anna Paula Luck, Daniela Mesquita, Luisa Parente, Margaret Yada
1991	28th place	Debora Biffe, Marina Fagundes, Anna Fernandes, Luisa Parente
1994	—N/a	did not participate
1995	21st place	Soraya Carvalho, Beatriz Degani, Mariana Gonçalves, Leticia Ishii, Liliane Koreipasu, Beatrice Martins, Melissa Sugimote
1997	—N/a	did not participate
1999	18th place	Heine Araújo, Camila Comin, Marilia Gomes, Daniele Hypólito, Stefani Salani, Daiane dos Santos
2001	11th place	Heine Araújo, Coral Borda, Camila Comin, Daniele Hypólito, Stefani Salani, Daiane dos Santos
2003	8th place	Camila Comin, Daniele Hypólito, Caroline Molinari, Ana Paula Rodrigues, Daiane dos Santos, Laís Souza. Alternate: Thais Silva
2006	7th place	Camila Comin, Bruna da Costa, Daniele Hypólito, Daiane dos Santos, Juliana Santos, Laís Souza
2007	5th place	Jade Barbosa, Khiuani Dias, Daniele Hypólito, Daiane dos Santos, Ana Cláudia Silva, Laís Souza
2010	10th place	Jade Barbosa, Priscila Cobello, Ethiene Franco, Adrian Gomes, Daniele Hypólito, Bruna Leal. Alternate: Gabriela Soares
2011	14th place	Jade Barbosa, Adrian Gomes, Daniele Hypólito, Bruna Leal, Daiane dos Santos, Ana Cláudia Silva. Alternate: Priscila Cobello
2014	16th place	Leticia Costa, Isabelle Cruz, Daniele Hypólito, Maria Cecília Cruz, Mariana Oliveira, Julie Sinmon. Alternate: Mariana Valentin
2015	9th place	Jade Barbosa, Daniele Hypólito, Thauany Lee, Leticia Costa, Flávia Saraiva, Lorrane Oliveira. Alternate: Lorenna Antunes
2018	7th place	Jade Barbosa, Rebeca Andrade, Thaís Fidélis, Flávia Saraiva, Lorrane Oliveira. Alternate: Anna Júlia Reis
2019	14th place	Jade Barbosa, Letícia Costa, Thaís Fidélis, Lorrane Oliveira, Flávia Saraiva. Alternate: Isabel Barbosa
2022	4th place	Rebeca Andrade, Flávia Saraiva, Lorrane Oliveira, Júlia Soares, Carolyne Pedro. Alternate: Christal Bezerra
2023	silver medal	Rebeca Andrade, Jade Barbosa, Flávia Saraiva, Lorrane Oliveira, Júlia Soares. Alternate: Carolyne Pedro
2026	5th place	Rebeca Andrade, Thaís Fidélis, Lorrane Oliveira, Flávia Saraiva, Sophia Weisberg. Alternate: Gabriela Bouças

== Most decorated gymnasts ==
This list includes all Brazilian female artistic gymnasts who have won a medal at the FIG World Cup Final (from 1975 to 2008), the World Artistic Gymnastics Championships, or the Olympic Games.

Rank	Gymnast	Team	AA	VT	UB	BB	FX	Olympic Total	World Total	World Cup Total	Total
1	Rebeca Andrade	2024; 2023	2020; 2024; 2022; 2023	2020; 2024; 2021; 2023; 2026	2021	2023	2024; 2022; 2023	6	10	0	16
2	Jade Barbosa	2024; 2023	2007	2010				1	3	0	4
2	Flávia Saraiva	2024; 2023				2026	2023	1	3	0	4
4	Daiane dos Santos						2003; 2004; 2006	0	1	2	3
5	Daniele Hypólito					2006	2001	0	1	1	2
6	Lorrane Oliveira	2024; 2023						1	1	0	2
6	Laís Souza			2006			2006	0	0	2	2
6	Júlia Soares	2024; 2023						1	1	0	2
9	Carolyne Pedro	2023						0	1	0	1

== Best international results ==
Event	TF	AA	VT	UB	BB	FX
Olympic Games	3rd place, bronze medalist(s)	2nd place, silver medalist(s)	1st place, gold medalist(s)	10	4	1st place, gold medalist(s)
World Championships	2nd place, silver medalist(s)	1st place, gold medalist(s)	1st place, gold medalist(s)	2nd place, silver medalist(s)	3rd place, bronze medalist(s)	1st place, gold medalist(s)
FIG World Cup Final (1975–2008)	—N/a	11	2nd place, silver medalist(s)	5	2nd place, silver medalist(s)	1st place, gold medalist(s)
Pan American Games	2nd place, silver medalist(s)	2nd place, silver medalist(s)	1st place, gold medalist(s)	1st place, gold medalist(s)	1st place, gold medalist(s)	2nd place, silver medalist(s)
Pan American Championships	1st place, gold medalist(s)	1st place, gold medalist(s)	1st place, gold medalist(s)	1st place, gold medalist(s)	1st place, gold medalist(s)	1st place, gold medalist(s)
Junior Pan American Games	2nd place, silver medalist(s)	6	2nd place, silver medalist(s)	6	3rd place, bronze medalist(s)	4
Junior Pan American Championships	1st place, gold medalist(s)	1st place, gold medalist(s)	1st place, gold medalist(s)	1st place, gold medalist(s)	1st place, gold medalist(s)	1st place, gold medalist(s)
South American Games	1st place, gold medalist(s)	1st place, gold medalist(s)	1st place, gold medalist(s)	1st place, gold medalist(s)	1st place, gold medalist(s)	1st place, gold medalist(s)
South American Championships	1st place, gold medalist(s)	1st place, gold medalist(s)	1st place, gold medalist(s)	1st place, gold medalist(s)	1st place, gold medalist(s)	1st place, gold medalist(s)
FIG All-Around World Cup series	—N/a	3rd place, bronze medalist(s)	—N/a	—N/a	—N/a	—N/a
FIG Apparatus World Cup series	—N/a	—N/a	1st place, gold medalist(s)	1st place, gold medalist(s)	1st place, gold medalist(s)	1st place, gold medalist(s)
FIG World Challenge Cup series	—N/a	—N/a	1st place, gold medalist(s)	1st place, gold medalist(s)	1st place, gold medalist(s)	1st place, gold medalist(s)
Youth Olympics	—N/a	2nd place, silver medalist(s)	6	10	2nd place, silver medalist(s)	1st place, gold medalist(s)
Junior World Championships	7	15	12	17	7	11
Universiade			2nd place, silver medalist(s)	9		1st place, gold medalist(s)

== See also ==
- Brazil men's national artistic gymnastics team
- Brazil at the World Artistic Gymnastics Championships
- Gymnastics at the Pan American Games
- Gymnastics at the South American Games
- Pan American Gymnastics Championships
- South American Gymnastics Championships
- List of Olympic female artistic gymnasts for Brazil
