= Caroline Molinari =

Brazilian artistic gymnast (born 1986)

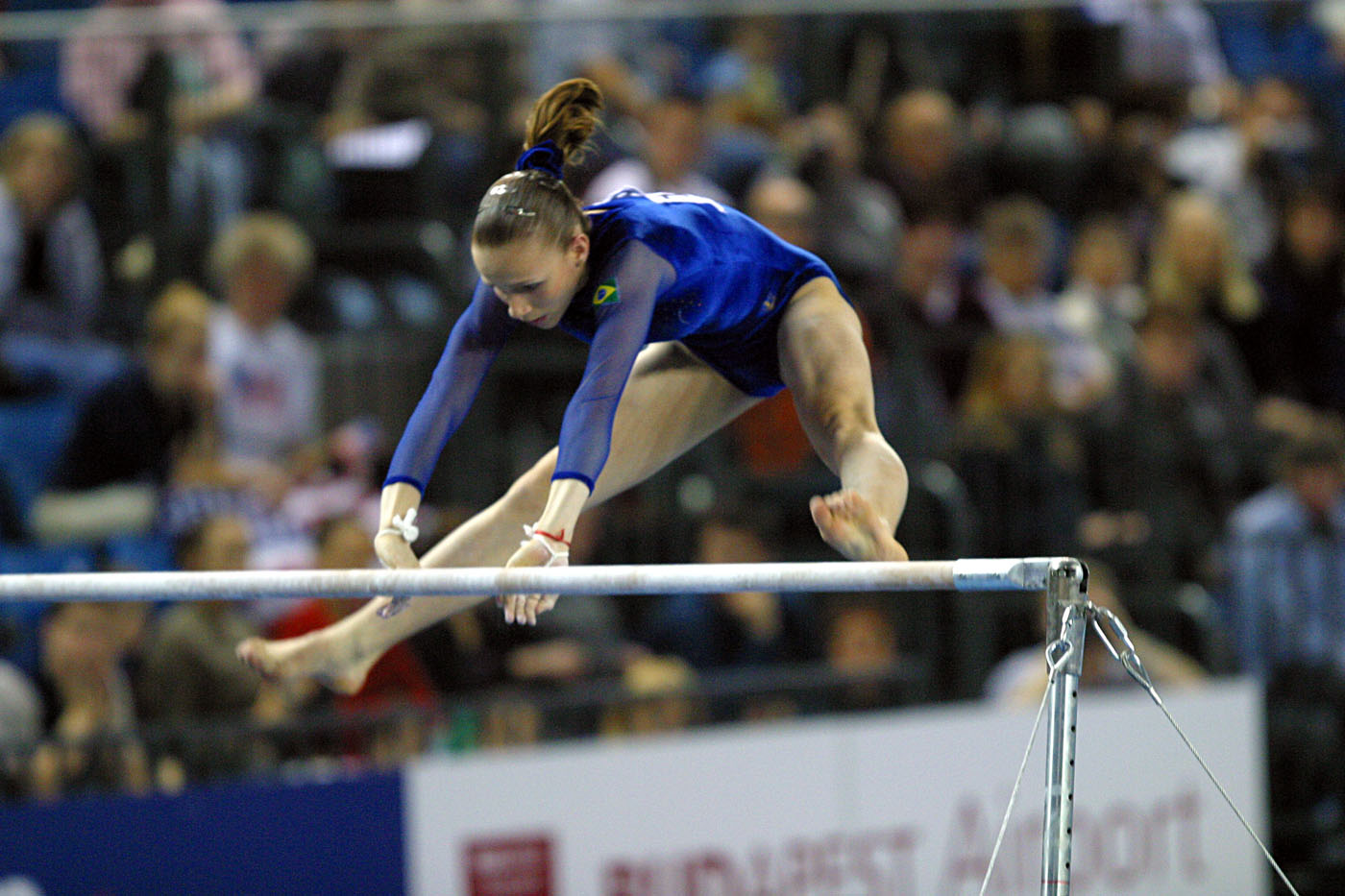
- Molinari at the 2002 World Championships

Personal information
- Full name: Caroline Inácio Molinari
- Born: 13 October 1986 (age 39) Curitiba, Brazil
- Height: 159 cm (5 ft 3 in)

Gymnastics career
- Discipline: Women's artistic gymnastics
- Country represented: Brazil (2000–2004)
Medal record
Pan American Games
Bronze medal – third place	2003 Santo Domingo	Team
South American Games
Gold medal – first place	2002 Curitiba	Team
Silver medal – second place	2002 Curitiba	All-around

Caroline Inácio Molinari (born 13 October 1986) is a Brazilian retired artistic gymnast. She won a bronze medal in the team event at the 2003 Pan American Games, and she is the 2002 South American Games all-around silver medalist. She competed with the Brazilian team that placed ninth at the 2004 Summer Olympics.

== Gymnastics career ==
Molinari won a bronze medal with the Brazilian team at the 2000 Junior Pan American Championships, held in her hometown. She won a team gold medal at the 2002 South American Games, which were also held in Curitiba, and she won the individual all-around silver medal behind teammate Daniele Hypólito.

In 2003, Molinari competed at a friendly meet against Spain and Romania, where Brazil placed third. Individually, she placed ninth in the all-around. She represented Brazil at the 2003 Pan American Games and won a bronze medal in the team competition. She also advanced to the all-around final and finished ninth. Later that year, she competed at the 2003 World Championships in Anaheim, California, and helped Brazil advance into the team final. She competed on the uneven bars in the team final and scored 9.312, and Brazil placed eighth.

Molinari was selected to represent Brazil at the 2004 Summer Olympics alongside Hypólito, Camila Comin, Daiane dos Santos, Ana Paula Rodrigues, and Laís Souza. She only competed on the balance beam and scored 7.512. Brazil placed ninth in the qualifications and did not advance to the team final.

In 2009, Molinari became an assistant coach for the Brazil women's national artistic gymnastics team.
