= Ethiene Franco =

Brazilian artistic gymnast (born 1992)

- Full name: Ethiene Cristina Gonser Franco
- Born: 27 April 1992 (age 34) Curitiba, Brazil
- Height: 153 cm (5 ft 0 in)

Gymnastics career
- Discipline: Women's artistic gymnastics
- Country represented: Brazil
Medal record
Representing Brazil
Women's artistic gymnastics
Pan American Championships
Bronze medal – third place	2010 Guadalajara	Team
South American Games
Gold medal – first place	2006 Buenos Aires	Team
Gold medal – first place	2010 Medellín	Team
Silver medal – second place	2006 Buenos Aires	All-around
Silver medal – second place	2006 Buenos Aires	Balance beam
Silver medal – second place	2006 Buenos Aires	Floor exercise
South American Championships
Gold medal – first place	2011 Santiago	Team
Event	1st	2nd	3rd
FIG World Cup	0	0	4
Total	0	0	4

Ethiene Cristina Gonser Franco (born 27 April 1992) is a Brazilian former artistic gymnast who competed at the 2008 Summer Olympics and the 2012 Summer Olympics. She won four medals at the 2006 South American Games and won a team bronze medal at the 2010 Pan American Championships.

== Gymnastics career ==
Franco competed alongside Jade Barbosa, Khiuani Dias, and Ana Cláudia Silva at the 2006 Junior Pan American Championships, and they won the silver medal behind the United States. She then helped Brazil win the team title at the 2006 South American Games. Individually, she won silver medals in the all-around, on the balance beam, and on the floor exercise, all behind Barbosa. At the 2007 Junior Pan American Championships, she won bronze medals in the team event and on the uneven bars.

Franco was initially the alternate for Brazil's team at the 2008 Summer Olympics. However, she was added to the team after Khiuani Dias was injured. At 16 years old, she was Brazil's youngest athlete at these Olympics. The team advanced to the team final, where Franco competed on the balance beam to help the team finish eighth.

Franco won bronze medals on the uneven bars at the 2009 Cottbus and Maribor World Cups. Later at the Moscow World Cup, she won bronze medals on both the balance beam and the floor exercise. She finished sixth on the uneven bars at the Osijek World Cup. At the 2009 World Championships, she finished 35th in the all-around qualification round.

Franco helped Brazil win the team bronze medal at the 2010 Pan American Championships, behind the United States and Canada. She won a team gold medal at the 2010 South American Games. At the 2010 World Championships, she helped the Brazilian team finish tenth in the qualifications, two spots away from the team final. She also competed with the Brazilian team that won a team gold medal at the 2011 South American Championships.

Franco was once again initially an alternate for the Olympic team in 2012, but was called up to compete when Laís Souza injured her hand. She competed in the all-around for Brazil, but the team finished 12th and did not advance into any finals. She retired from competition after these Olympic Games.
