= 2006 Junior Pan American Artistic Gymnastics Championships =

International sports competition

Junior Pan American Artistic Gymnastics Championships
- Location: Gatineau, Canada
- Date: August 25–27, 2006

The 2006 Junior Pan American Artistic Gymnastics Championships was held in Gatineau, Canada, August 25–27, 2006.

== Medal summary ==
Event	Gold	Silver	Bronze
Women
Team	United States; Bianca Flohr; Rebecca Bross; Samantha Peszek; Shawn Johnson	Brazil; Jade Barbosa; Khiuani Dias; Ana Cláudia Silva; Ethiene Franco	Canada; Nansy Damianova; Sydney Sawa; Charlotte Mackie; Brittany Rogers
All Around	Shawn Johnson (USA)	Bianca Flohr (USA)	Jade Barbosa (BRA)
Vault	Rebecca Bross (USA)	Samantha Peszek (USA)	Jade Barbosa (BRA)
Uneven bars	Bianca Flohr (USA)	Shawn Johnson (USA)	Nansy Damianova (CAN)
Balance beam	Shawn Johnson (USA)	Bianca Flohr (USA)	Charlotte Mackie (CAN)
Floor exercise	Samantha Peszek (USA)	Shawn Johnson (USA)	Charlotte Mackie (CAN)
Men
Team	United States; Tim Gentry; Ryan Lieberman; Miguel Pineda; Philip Onorato	Brazil; Marcos Barros; Sergio Eras; Tomás Siqueira; Francisco Barretto	Canada; Jayd Lukenchuk; Jackson Payne; Alexander Hoy; Alexander Rayment
All Around	Ryan Lieberman (USA)	Philip Onorato (USA)	Daniel Corral (MEX)
Floor exercise	Marcos Barros (BRA)	Philip Onorato (USA)	Jackson Payne (CAN)
Pommel horse	Daniel Corral (MEX)	Joaquin Ramirez (MEX)	Ryan Lieberman (USA)
Rings	Philip Onorato (USA)	Tim Gentry (USA)	Marcos Barros (BRA)
Vault	Joaquin Ramirez (MEX)	Tim Gentry (USA)	Tomás Siqueira (BRA)
Parallel bars	Adickxon Trejo (VEN)	Ryan Lieberman (USA)	Jayd Lukenchuk (CAN)
Horizontal bar	Tim Gentry (USA)	Ryan Lieberman (USA)	Francisco Barretto (BRA)

== Medal table ==
Rank	Nation	Gold	Silver	Bronze	Total
1	United States (USA)	10	11	1	22
2	Mexico (MEX)	2	1	1	4
3	Brazil (BRA)	1	2	5	8
4	Venezuela (VEN)	1	0	0	1
5	Canada (CAN)	0	0	7	7
Totals (5 entries)		14	14	14	42
