= List of Olympic male artistic gymnasts for Brazil =

Gymnastics events have been staged at the Olympic Games since 1896. João Luiz Ribeiro became the first Brazilian male artistic gymnast to participate in the Olympics, doing so at the 1980 Olympic Games. At the 2012 Olympic Games Arthur Zanetti became the first Brazilian male gymnast to win an Olympic medal, winning gold on rings.

== Gymnasts ==
Gymnast	Years
Francisco Barretto Júnior	2016, 2020
Gerson Gnoatto	1984
Diego Hypólito	2008, 2012, 2016
Arthur Mariano	2016, 2020, 2024
Marco Monteiro	1992
Gil Pinto	1988
João Luiz Ribeiro	1980
Mosiah Rodrigues	2004
Sérgio Sasaki	2012, 2016
Diogo Soares	2020, 2024
Caio Souza	2020
Arthur Zanetti	2012, 2016, 2020

== Medalists ==
Medal	Name	Year	Event
Gold	Arthur Zanetti	(United Kingdom) 2012 London	Men's rings
Silver	Diego Hypólito	(Brazil) 2016 Rio de Janeiro	Men's floor exercise
Bronze	Arthur Mariano	(Brazil) 2016 Rio de Janeiro	Men's floor exercise
Silver	Arthur Zanetti	(Brazil) 2016 Rio de Janeiro	Men's rings

== Gallery ==
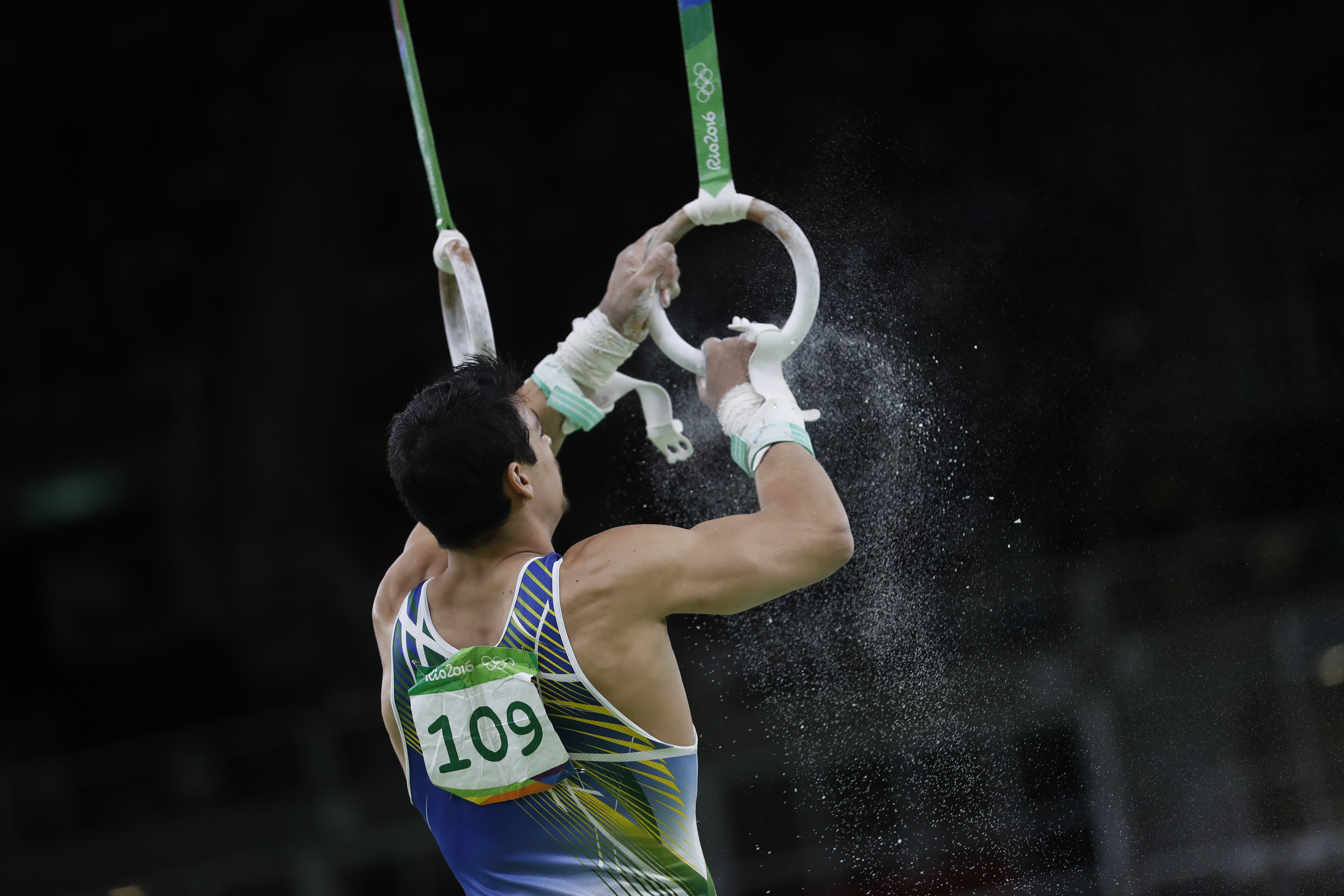
Francisco Barretto

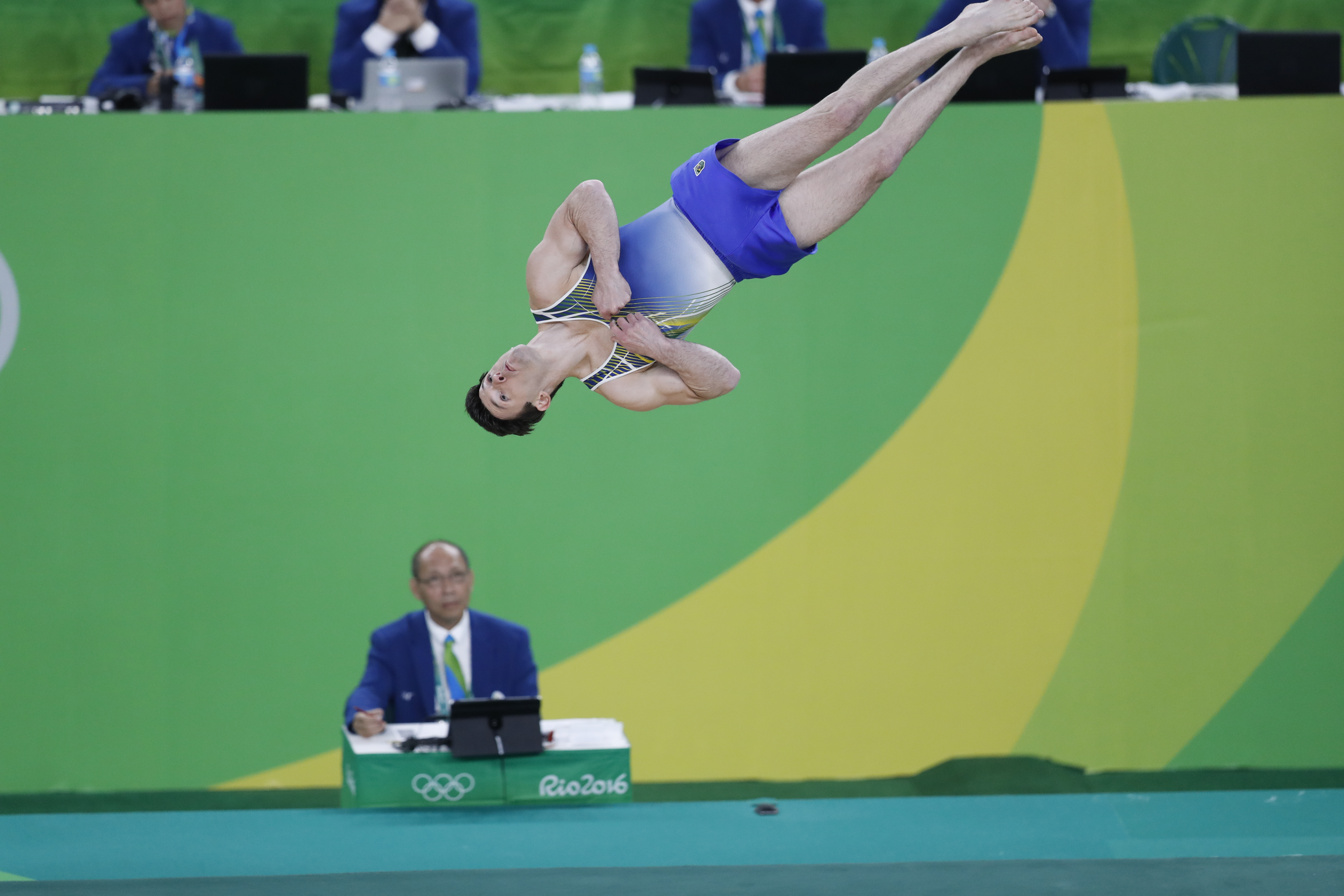
Diego Hypólito

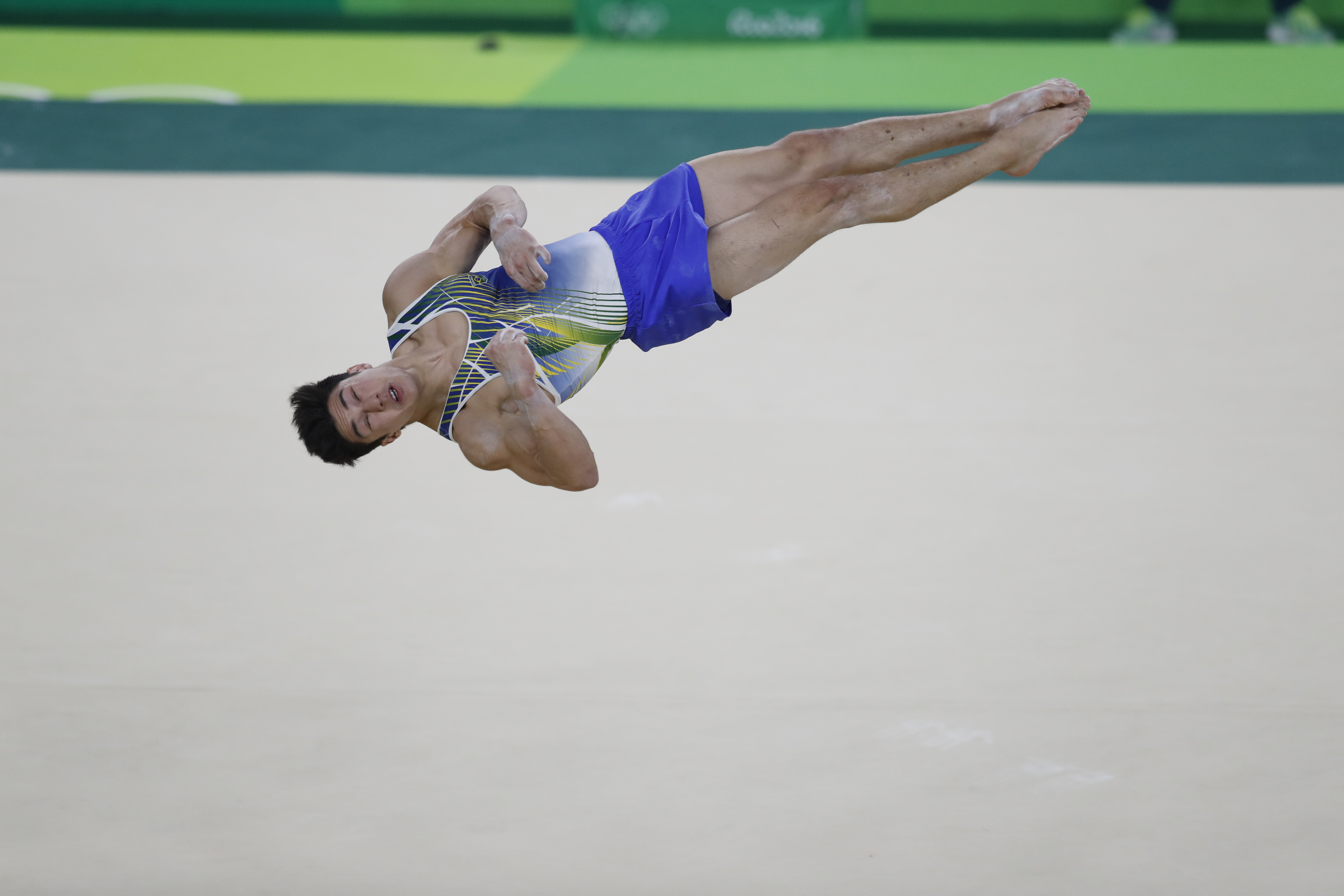
Arthur Mariano

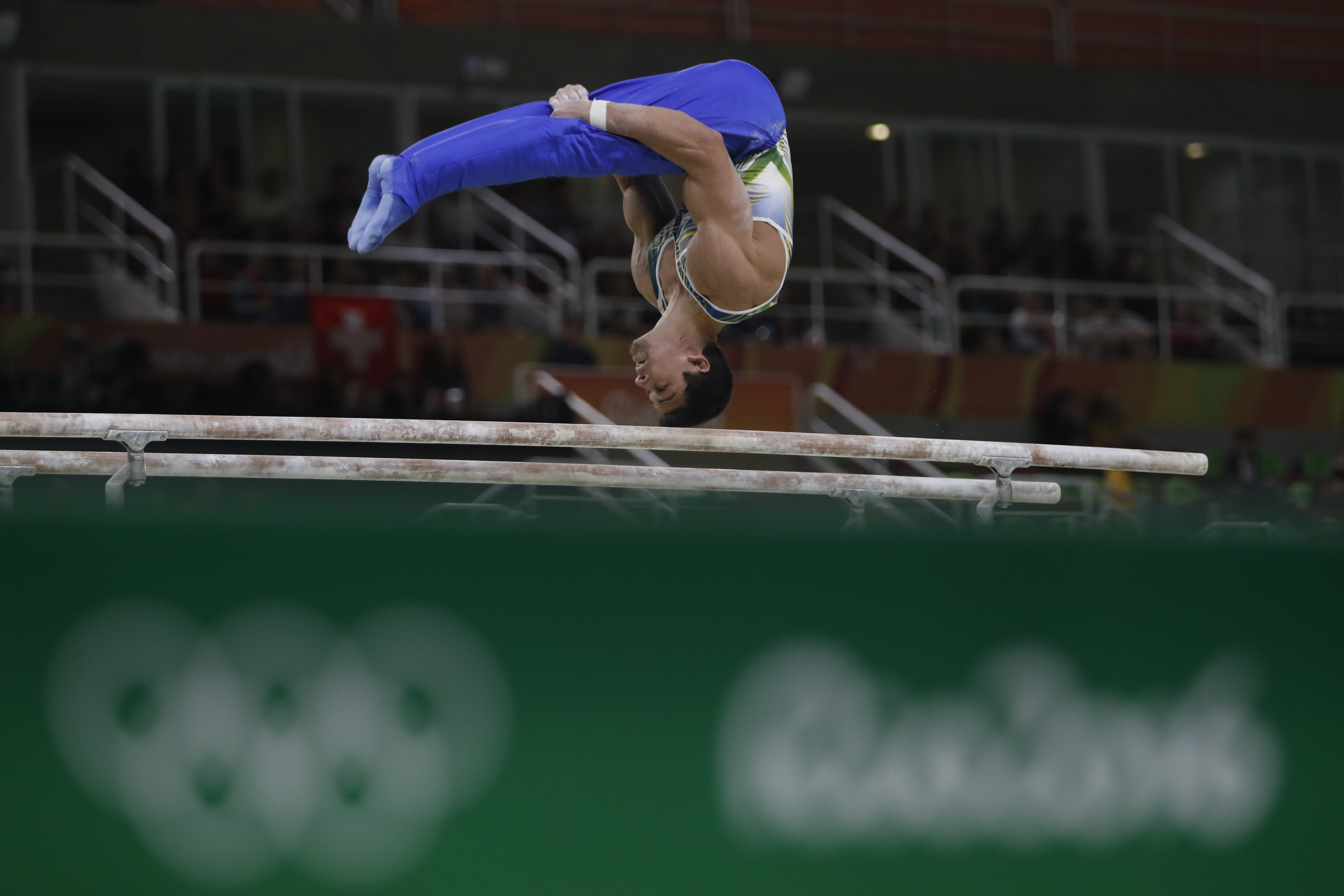
Sérgio Sasaki

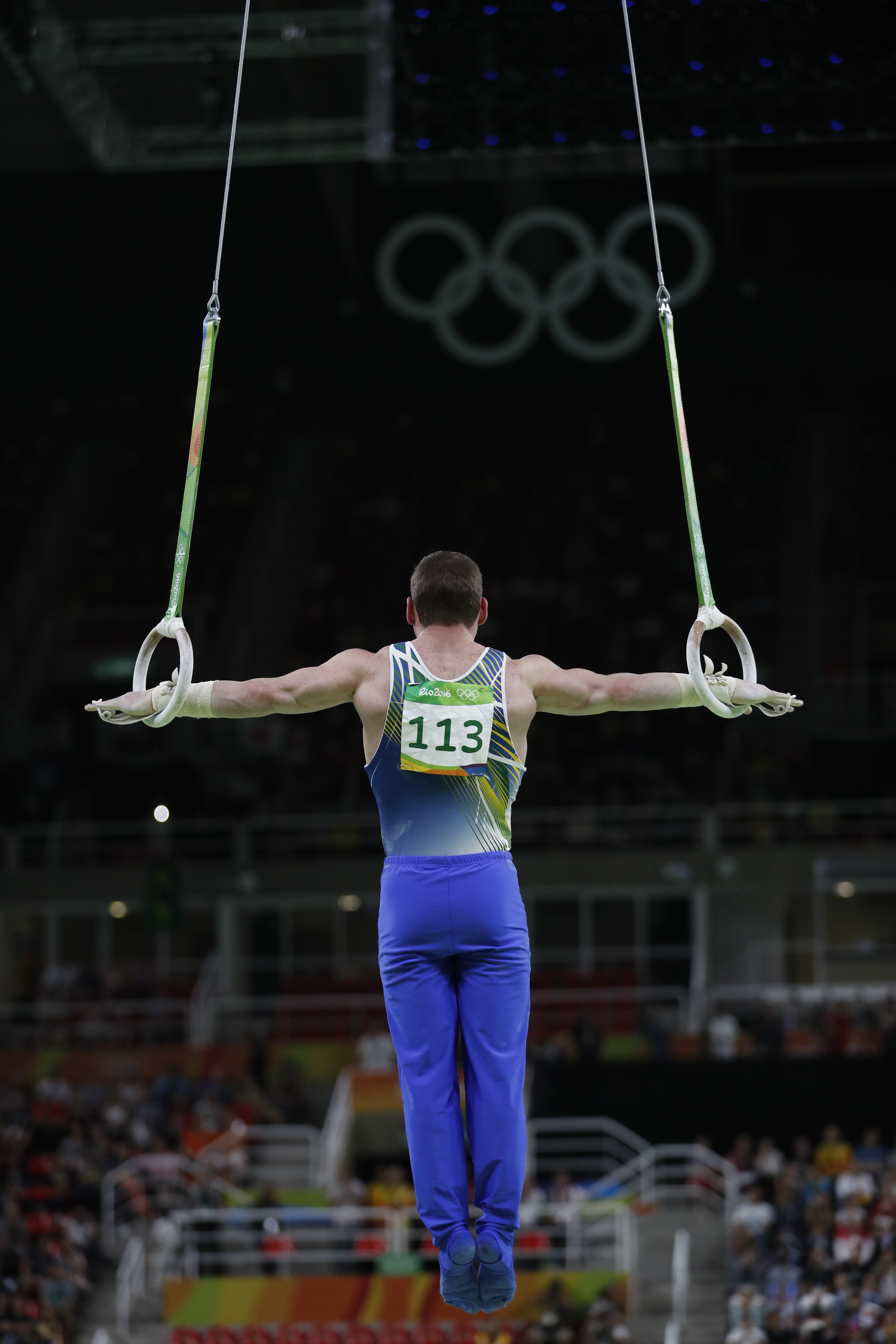
Arthur Zanetti

Brazilian men at the 2016 Olympic Games

== See also ==
- Brazil men's national artistic gymnastics team
- List of Olympic female artistic gymnasts for Brazil
