= Jessie DeZiel =

American artistic gymnast

- Born: August 12, 1993 (age 33) Crystal, Minnesota, U.S.
- Height: 5 ft 4 in (163 cm)

Gymnastics career
- Discipline: Women's artistic gymnastics
- Country represented: United States (2011–12)
- College team: Nebraska Cornhuskers (2011–2015)
- Club: Twin City Twisters
- Head coach: Mike Hunger
- Retired: 2015
Medal record
Representing the United States
Pan American Games
Gold medal – first place	2011 Guadalajara	Team

Jessica "Jessie" DeZiel (born August 12, 1993) is an American former artistic gymnast and current coach. She won a gold medal with the American team at the 2011 Pan American Games. She attended the University of Nebraska–Lincoln and was a member of its gymnastics team from 2012 to 2015 and was a nine-time All-American. As of 2026, she is the head coach of the UW-Eau Claire gymnastics team.

== Gymnastics career ==
DeZiel won the all-around at both the 2010 and 2011 Level 10 National Championships. She qualified to compete at the senior elite level in 2011 and made her elite debut at the U.S. Classic, competing on the vault, balance beam, and floor exercise. She finished with the third-highest score on the vault and the sixth-highest score on the floor exercise. She advanced to the 2011 U.S. Championships, where she placed 12th on the floor exercise. She was selected to represent the United States at the 2011 Pan American Games alongside Bridgette Caquatto, Brandie Jay, Shawn Johnson, Grace McLaughlin, and Bridget Sloan. The team won the gold medal, with DeZiel contributing the team's highest scores on the vault, balance beam, and floor exercise. She advanced into the floor exercise final, finishing sixth.

DeZiel began competing for the Nebraska Cornhuskers gymnastics team in 2012. She competed at the NCAA Championships all four years and was a nine-time All-American. She won the 2012 Big Ten Conference Freshman of the Year award and became the conference champion on the floor exercise. The next year, she became the Big Ten Conference champion on the vault. She was named the 2015 Nebraska Female Student-Athlete of the Year and also received the Big Ten Medal of Honor.

== Coaching career ==
DeZiel stayed with the Nebraska Cornhuskers for one year as a student assistant coach. She then spent three seasons as an assistant coach for the Ball State Cardinals as their floor exercise coach. She then spent one season with the Illinois Fighting Illini as their balance beam coach before returning to Nebraska as a volunteer assistant coach. She was hired as the head coach for UW-Eau Claire in 2021.

DeZiel joined the Olympic selection committee for the United States women's national artistic gymnastics team in February 2020, helping select the teams that competed at the 2020 and 2024 Summer Olympics.

== Personal life ==
DeZiel was born in Crystal, Minnesota, and grew up in Rogers. She graduated from Spectrum High School in 2011. Her sister, Brittany DeZiel, was also a gymnast and competed at UW-Stout. She graduated from the University of Nebraska–Lincoln in 2016 with a Bachelor of Science in Nutrition Exercise and Health Science.
