= 2011 South American Artistic Gymnastics Championships =

International artistic gymnastics competition

The 2011 South American Artistic Gymnastics Championships were held in Santiago, Chile, August 4–8, 2011. The competition was organized by the Chilean Gymnastics Federation and approved by the International Gymnastics Federation. This was the 10th edition of the South American Artistic Gymnastics Championships for senior gymnasts.

== Participating nations ==
- Argentina
- Bolivia
- Brazil
- Chile
- Colombia
- Ecuador
- Peru
- Uruguay
- Venezuela

== Medalists ==
Event	Gold	Silver	Bronze
Men
Team all-around	Brazil; Caio Costa; Danilo Nogueira; Pericles Silva; Diego Hypólito; Mosiah Rodrigues; Arthur Mariano	Colombia; Jorge Peña; Jorge Giraldo; Johnny Muñoz; Javier Sandoval; Jossimar Calvo; Fabian Meza	Chile; Christian Bruno; Juan Raffo; Juan González; Felipe Piña; Tomás González
Individual all-around	Tomás González (CHI)	Jorge Giraldo (COL)	Pericles Silva (BRA)
Floor	Tomás González (CHI)	Diego Hypólito (BRA)	Juan Pablo González (CHI)
Pommel horse	Mosiah Rodrigues (BRA)	Pericles Silva (BRA)	Jorge Peña (COL)
Rings	Federico Molinari (ARG)	Tomás González (CHI)	Danilo Nogueira (BRA)
Vault	Tomás González (CHI)	Diego Hypólito (BRA)	Arthur Mariano (BRA)
Parallel bars	Jorge Giraldo (COL)	Tomás González (CHI)	Federico Molinari (ARG)
Horizontal bar	Jorge Giraldo (COL)	Mosiah Rodrigues (BRA)	Adickxon Trejo (VEN)
Women
Team all-around	Brazil; Adrian Gomes; Bruna Leal; Gabriela Soares; Ethiene Franco; Priscila Cobello; Harumy de Freitas	Argentina; Valeria Pereyra; Ailen Valente; Merlina Galera; Lucila Estarli; Agustina Estarli; María Belen Stoffel	Chile; Simona Castro; Makarena Pinto; Bárbara Achondo; Martina Castro; Melany Cabrera; Makarena Riquelme
Individual all-around	Adrian Gomes (BRA)	Bruna Leal (BRA)	Valeria Pereyra (ARG)
Vault	Adrian Gomes (BRA)	Makarena Pinto (CHI)	Yarimar Medina (VEN)
Uneven bars	Valeria Pereyra (ARG)	Yuri Avendaño (VEN)	Bibiana Vélez (COL)
Balance beam	Adrian Gomes (BRA)	Simona Castro (CHI)	Fanny Briceño (VEN)
Floor	Jessica Gil (COL)	Bruna Leal (BRA)	Gabriela Soares (BRA)

== Medal table ==
Rank	Nation	Gold	Silver	Bronze	Total
1	Brazil (BRA)	6	6	4	16
2	Chile (CHI)	3	4	3	10
3	Colombia (COL)	3	2	2	7
4	Argentina (ARG)	2	1	2	5
5	Venezuela (VEN)	0	1	3	4
Totals (5 entries)		14	14	14	42
