= Priscila Domingues Cobello =

Brazilian artistic gymnast (born 1992)

- Born: 19 May 1992 (age 34) Bahia, Brazil

Gymnastics career
- Discipline: Women's artistic gymnastics
- Country represented: Brazil (2008–2013)
Medal record
Pan American Championships
Bronze medal – third place	2010 Guadalajara	Team
South American Games
Gold medal – first place	2010 Medellín	Team
Bronze medal – third place	2010 Medellín	All-around
South American Championships
Gold medal – first place	2009 Sogamoso	Team
Gold medal – first place	2009 Sogamoso	All-around
Gold medal – first place	2009 Sogamoso	Balance beam
Gold medal – first place	2009 Sogamoso	Floor exercise
Gold medal – first place	2011 Santiago	Team
Silver medal – second place	2009 Sogamoso	Uneven bars

Priscila Domingues Cobello (born 19 May 1992) is a Brazilian former artistic gymnast. She won a team bronze medal at the 2010 Pan American Championships and a team gold medal at the 2010 South American Games. She won four gold medals at the 2009 South American Championships, including the all-around title.

== Gymnastics career ==
At the 2009 South American Championships, Domingues Cobello helped Brazil win the team title and also won the individual all-around competition. She also won the gold medals on the balance beam and floor exercise and a silver medal on the uneven bars, behind teammate Khiuani Dias. She competed on the vault and the floor exercise at the 2009 World Championships but did not advance into either apparatus final.

Domingues Cobello won a team gold medal at the 2010 South American Games. She also won a silver medal in the all-around, behind Jessica López and Bruna Leal. She then helped Brazil win the team bronze medal at the 2010 Pan American Championships, behind the United States and Canada. At the 2010 World Championships, she helped the Brazilian team finish tenth in the qualifications, two spots away from the team final.

Domingues Cobello helped Brazil win the team title at the 2011 South American Championships. She competed at the 2011 World Championships, where Brazil finished 14th in the qualifications. She then represented Brazil at the 2011 Pan American Games, where Brazil finished fifth in the team competition.

Domingues Cobello competed on the uneven bars and the balance beam at the 2012 Doha World Challenge but did not advance into either apparatus final. She retired from competition in 2013.

== Post-gymnastics career ==
Domingues Cobello graduated with a degree in physical education and owns a pilates studio in Jardim Bandeirantes, Sorocaba.
