= Dos Santos I =

The Double Arabian Piked is an element in gymnastics. It consists of a double somersault in a piked position with a one half (180°) twist in the air. This move was first performed by Brazilian gymnast Daiane dos Santos. In the Portuguese language, it became known as duplo twist carpado. For this reason, it was given the name "Dos Santos".

== History ==
In 2003, when she performed this move for the first time, dos Santos won the gold medal in the floor exercise event at the Anaheim World Championships in the United States of America.

In 2007, American Alicia Sacramone included the same move in her routine. However, dos Santos is still the only athlete to perform the dos Santos in a laid-out (stretched) position, which has a higher degree of difficulty and is listed in the Table of Elements as the Dos Santos II.

The name of the movement in Portuguese (duplo twist carpado) has become a popular expression in Brazil to indicate something that requires great effort or great difficulty.

== Analysis ==
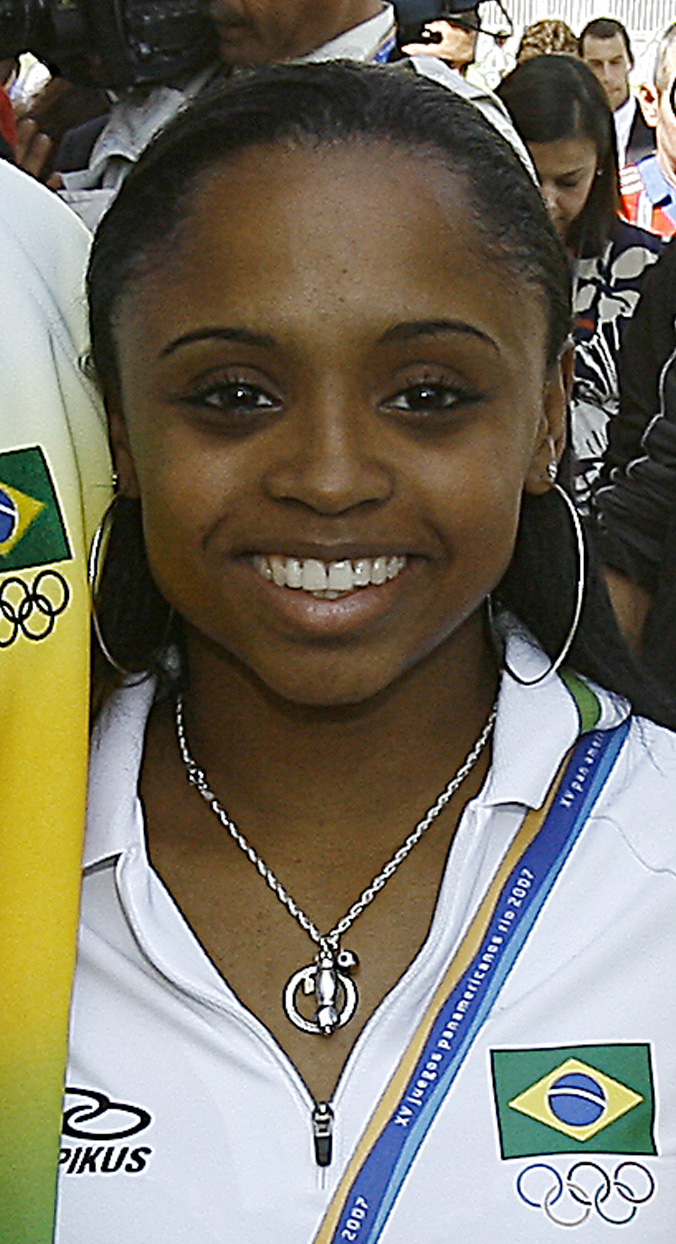
Brazilian gymnast Daiane dos Santos.

=== Technique ===
Listed below are the characteristics analyzed of the gymnast's movement, based on kinematic analyses of physics:

- Height: (maximum displacement of the center of gravity): 1.54 meters.
- Maximum height reached (with the feet during the first somersault): 2.77 meters.
- Distance covered horizontally: 1.30 meters.
- Duration: 1.07 seconds.
- Vertical speed of departure and arrival: 5.2 m/s or 19.7 km/h.
- Maximum rotation speed in the air: 900 degrees/second.

=== Biomechanics ===
Before the jump itself, the gymnast performs a series of movements during the run to gain speed in the horizontal direction (amount of linear movement) and amount of rotation (or amount of angular movement), since there is a pirouette (rotation) in the air. At the end of the run, a movement of great vertical speed is performed to gain momentum in this direction. During the movement, the center of gravity describes a parabolic trajectory acquired by the speed and exit angle at the moment of the start of the jump. One should jump as high as possible - in order to remain in the air for longer - to store a greater amount of angular movement and thus be able to perform the rotations of the acrobatics.
