= 2009 South American Artistic Gymnastics Championships =

The 2009 South American Artistic Gymnastics Championships were held in Sogamoso, Colombia October 28 – November 2, 2009. This was the 9th edition of the South American Artistic Gymnastics Championships for senior gymnasts.

== Participating nations ==
- Argentina
- Brazil
- Chile
- Colombia
- Ecuador
- Peru
- Venezuela

== Medalists ==
Event	Gold	Silver	Bronze
Men
Team all-around	Colombia; Jorge Giraldo; Didier Lugo; David Castellanos; Fabian Meza	Brazil; Mosiah Rodrigues; Francisco Barreto; Caio Costa; Sergio Eras	Argentina; Federico Molinari; Osvaldo Martinez; Nicolas Cordoba; Mario Gorosito
Individual all-around	Jorge Giraldo (COL)	Didier Lugo (COL)	Mosiah Rodrigues (BRA)
Floor exercise	Mario Berrios (PER)	Federico Molinari (ARG) Mosiah Rodrigues (BRA)	None awarded
Pommel horse	Mosiah Rodrigues (BRA)	Jorge Giraldo (COL)	Federico Molinari (ARG)
Rings	Federico Molinari (ARG)	Jorge Giraldo (COL)	Osvaldo Martinez (ARG)
Vault	Francisco Barreto (BRA)	Mario Berrios (PER)	Osvaldo Martinez (ARG)
Parallel bars	Jorge Giraldo (COL)	Caio Costa (BRA)	Federico Molinari (ARG)
Horizontal bar	Francisco Barreto (BRA)	Mosiah Rodrigues (BRA)	Nicolas Cordoba (ARG)
Women
Team all-around	Brazil; Priscila Cobello; Ana Cláudia Silva; Khiuani Dias; Carolina Himovski	Colombia; Catalina Escobar; Yuri Avendaño; Gabriela Gomez	Argentina; Ayelen Tarabini; Agustina Estarli; Lucila Estarli; Mariela Bovone
Individual all-around	Priscila Cobello (BRA)	Ana Cláudia Silva (BRA)	Khiuani Dias (BRA)
Vault	Catalina Escobar (COL)	Yuri Avendaño (COL)	Carolina Himovski (BRA)
Uneven bars	Khiuani Dias (BRA)	Priscila Cobello (BRA)	Catalina Escobar (COL)
Balance beam	Priscila Cobello (BRA)	Ana Cláudia Silva (BRA)	Ayelen Tarabini (ARG)
Floor exercise	Priscila Cobello (BRA)	Ana Cláudia Silva (BRA)	Catalina Escobar (COL)

== Medal table ==
Rank	Nation	Gold	Silver	Bronze	Total
1	Brazil (BRA)	8	8	3	19
2	Colombia (COL)	4	5	2	11
3	Argentina (ARG)	1	1	8	10
4	Peru (PER)	1	1	0	2
Totals (4 entries)		14	15	13	42
