= Sho Nakamori =

American artistic gymnast

- Full name: Sho Brian Nakamori
- Born: September 9, 1985 (age 40) Oakland, California, U.S.
- Height: 5 ft 6 in (168 cm)

Gymnastics career
- Discipline: Men's artistic gymnastics
- Country represented: United States; (2007–2012)
- College team: Stanford Cardinal
- Gym: Champions Academy; San Mateo Gymnastics; USOTC
- Head coach: Zhang Jinjing
- Former coaches: Thom Glielmi, Vitaly Marinich
- Retired: June 11, 2012
Medal record
Men's artistic gymnastics
Representing United States
| Event | 1st | 2nd | 3rd |
|---|---|---|---|
| Pan American Games | 0 | 0 | 2 |
| Total | 0 | 0 | 2 |
Pan American Games
| Bronze medal – third place | 2003 Santo Domingo | Team |
| Bronze medal – third place | 2011 Guadalajara | Team |

Sho Brian Nakamori (born September 9, 1985) is a retired American artistic gymnast. He was a member of the United States men's national artistic gymnastics team and won a bronze medal representing the United States at the 2011 Pan American Games.

== Early life and education ==
Nakamori was born on September 9, 1985, in Oakland, California, to Kazuki and Tamae Nakamori. His father, Kazuki Nakamori, was a gymnast and was a member of the Japan men's national gymnastics team from 1982 to 1984.

Nakamori attended Albany High School, but left before his senior year to train in Colorado Springs, Colorado under Vitaly Marinich at the United States Olympic Training Center while attending Palmer High School. He almost made the United States men's national artistic gymnastics team at the age of 16, drawing comparisons to Chris Reigel, and was considered the top junior gymnast in the country. He enrolled at Stanford University to pursue gymnastics.

== Gymnastics career ==
Nakamori was a Stanford Cardinal men's gymnastics team member. He was a bronze medalist on the horizontal bar at the 2008 NCAA Men's Gymnastics Championships and Stanford won the national championship at the 2009 NCAA Men's Gymnastics Championships.

Domestically, Nakamori performed well at Winter Cups, placing third in the pommel horse at the 2004 Winter Cup and the individual all-around at the 2009 Winter Cup.

Internationally, he was initially named as the first alternate for the 2003 Pan American Games team. He ultimately was selected, but he broke his left femur while attempting a warm-up vault at the competition. The fracture required a steel rod to be inserted into his leg. He later competed at the 2011 Pan American Games and won a team bronze medal.

Nakamori retired from gymnastics on June 11, 2012, after his performance at the 2012 U.S. National Gymnastics Championships did not qualify him for the 2012 United States Olympic trials.
