= Susan Jackson (gymnast) =

Female gymnast from Louisiana

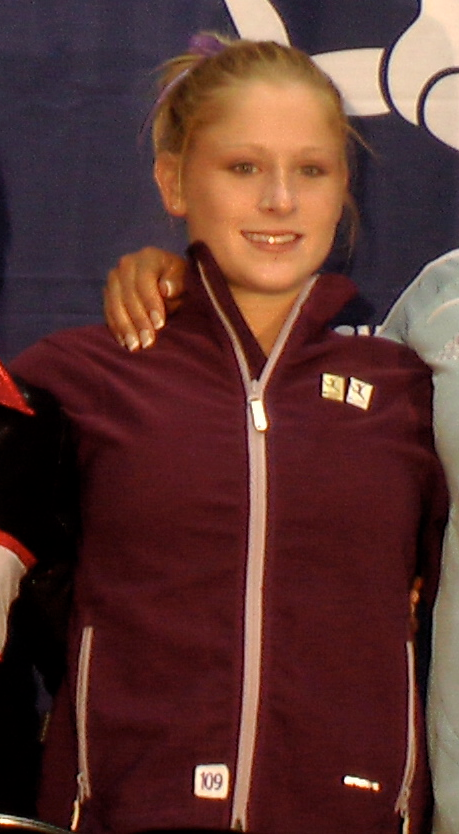
- Susan Jackson at the 2008 NCAA Championships

Personal information
- Full name: Susan Michelle Jackson
- Nickname: Suzie
- Born: April 6, 1987 (age 39) Spring, Texas, US

Gymnastics career
- Discipline: Women's artistic gymnastics
- Country represented: United States; (2000–2004)
- College team: LSU Tigers (2007–2010)
- Club: Stars Gymnastics
- Gym: Stars Gymnastics
- Head coaches: Dan Baker, Ashley Baker
- Retired: 2010
- Awards: Honda Sports Award (2010), AAI Award (2010)
Medal record
Women's artistic gymnastics
Representing United States
Junior Pan American Championships
Gold medal – first place	2000 Curitiba	Team

Susan Jackson (born April 6, 1987) is an American retired artistic gymnast. She competed for the LSU Tigers women's gymnastics team from 2007 to 2010. She is a three-time NCAA individual national champion and was the first gymnast in LSU history to win the NCAA all-around title.

== Early life ==
Jackson is from Spring, Texas. She trained at Stars Gymnastics in Houston under coaches Dan and Ashley Baker. She was a member of the United States women's national gymnastics team for four years and represented the U.S. at the 2000 Junior Pan American Championships, where she won a gold medal with the team.

== College career ==
Jackson began her career at Louisiana State University in 2007. In 2008, she won her first NCAA individual national title on the vault.

In 2010, Jackson won the NCAA all-around national championship with a score of 39.625. During the same meet, she won the individual national title on the balance beam. She is the only three-time NCAA individual champion in LSU history. During the 2010 season, she won 11 all-around titles, breaking an LSU school record that had stood for 30 years.

Jackson finished her college career with 74 individual titles, including 19 on vault, 16 in the all-around, 14 on bars, 13 on beam, and 12 on floor. She earned 12 First-Team All-America honors.

== Awards and honors ==
In 2010, Jackson became the first LSU gymnast to receive the AAI Award and the Honda Sports Award, both of which recognize the top female gymnast in the nation. Her other honors include:

- 2010 SEC Gymnast of the Year
- 2010 Central Region Gymnast of the Year
- 2010 Roy F. Kramer SEC Female Athlete of the Year

Jackson was inducted into the LSU Athletics Hall of Fame in 2019. In 2022, she was inducted into the Louisiana Sports Hall of Fame.
