= Harumy de Freitas =

Brazilian artistic gymnast (born 1995)

- Full name: Harumy Mariko de Freitas
- Born: 24 June 1995 (age 31) Curitiba, Brazil
- Height: 158 cm (5 ft 2 in)

Gymnastics career
- Discipline: Women's artistic gymnastics
- Country represented: Brazil (2009–2013)
Medal record
Women's gymnastics
Representing Brazil
South American Championships
Gold medal – first place	2011 Santiago	Team

Harumy Mariko de Freitas (born 24 June 1995) is a Brazilian former artistic gymnast. She competed at the 2012 Summer Olympics and at the 2010 Summer Youth Olympics. She won a team gold medal at the 2011 South American Championships.

== Gymnastics career ==
De Freitas originally trained in ballet and was invited to try gymnastics by a substitute teacher. She began training at the Gymnastics Excellence Center (CEGIN) in Curitiba.

De Freitas won a bronze medal in the team competition at the 2009 Junior Pan American Championships in Aracaju. She represented Brazil at the 2010 Summer Youth Olympics and finished 11th in the all-around final. She also advanced into the vault final, where she finished sixth, and the balance beam final, where she finished fifth.

De Freitas competed with the Brazilian team that won a team gold medal at the 2011 South American Championships. At the 2012 Stella Zakharova Cup in Kyiv, she placed 11th in the all-around. She competed on the uneven bars and the floor exercise at the 2012 Osijek World Challenge Cup but did not advance into either apparatus final.

De Freitas was initially an alternate for Brazil's team at the 2012 Summer Olympics and traveled to London in case of injury. She was called up to compete two days before the qualifications after Adrian Gomes withdrew due to a spinal injury. She only competed on the balance beam and fell, scoring 12.033. The Brazilian team finished 12th in the qualifications and did not advance.

De Freitas continued to train in 2013 but could not compete at the 2013 World Championships due to injury. She eventually retired, having not competed since the Olympic Games.
