= Gabriela Soares =

Brazilian artistic gymnast (born 1993)

Gabriela Henrique Soares
- Born: November 9, 1993 (age 32) Rio de Janeiro, Brazil
- Height: 154 cm (5 ft 1 in)

Gymnastics career
- Discipline: Women's artistic gymnastics
- Country represented: Brazil
- Retired: Yes
Medal record
Women's gymnastics
Representing Brazil
Pan American Championships
Bronze medal – third place	2010 Guadalajara	Team
South American Championships
Gold medal – first place	2011 Santiago	Team
Bronze medal – third place	2011 Santiago	Floor Exercise

Gabriela Henrique Soares (born November 9, 1993) is a Brazilian artistic gymnast. She was the alternate gymnast for team Brazil at the 2010 World Artistic Gymnastics Championships.
