= Adrian Gomes =

Brazilian artistic gymnast (born 1990)

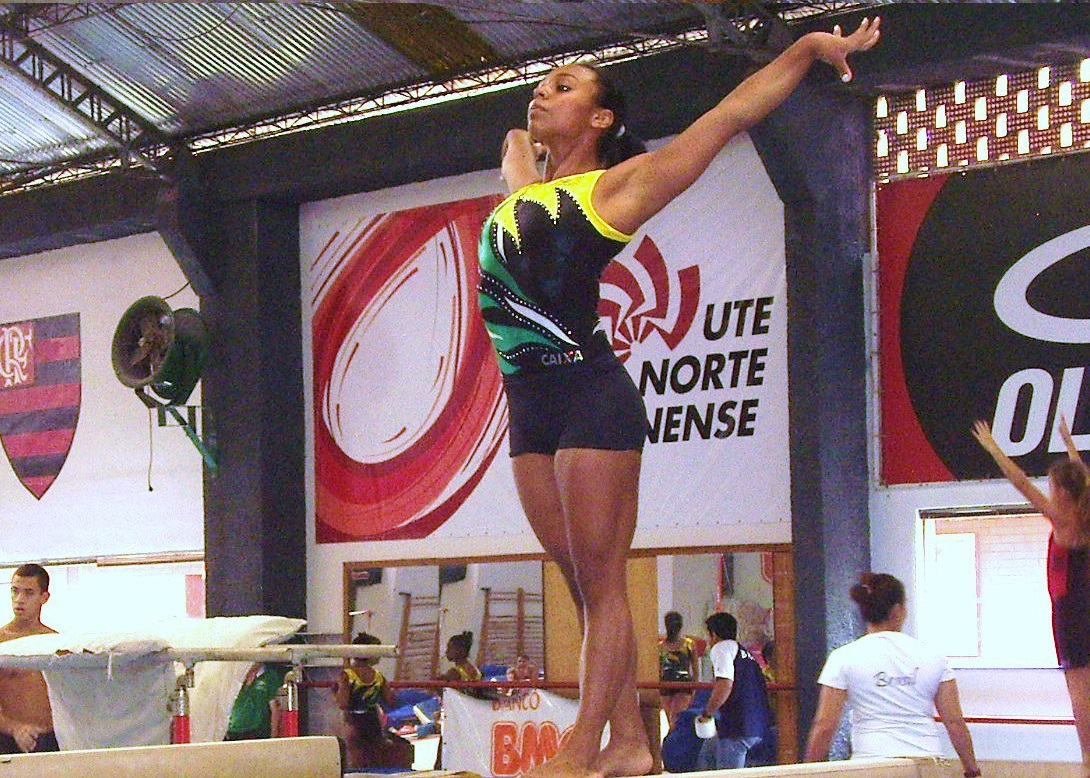
- Gomes training in 2011
- Full name: Adrian Geovana Nunes Gomes
- Born: 5 April 1990 (age 36) Porto Alegre, Brazil

Gymnastics career
- Discipline: Women's artistic gymnastics
- Country represented: Brazil; (2010–2013)
Medal record
Women's artistic gymnastics
Representing Brazil
Pan American Championships
Silver medal – second place	2012 Medellín	Balance beam
Bronze medal – third place	2010 Guadalajara	Team
Bronze medal – third place	2012 Medellín	Vault
South American Championships
Gold medal – first place	2011 Santiago	Team
Gold medal – first place	2011 Santiago	All-around
Gold medal – first place	2011 Santiago	Vault
Gold medal – first place	2011 Santiago	Balance beam
Gold medal – first place	2012 Rosario	All-around
Gold medal – first place	2012 Rosario	Uneven bars
Gold medal – first place	2012 Rosario	Balance aeam
Gold medal – first place	2012 Rosario	Floor exercise
Silver medal – second place	2012 Rosario	Team
Bronze medal – third place	2012 Rosario	Vault
Event	1st	2nd	3rd
FIG World Challenge Cup	0	0	2
Total	0	0	2

Adrian Geovana Nunes Gomes (born 5 April 1990) is a Brazilian former artistic gymnast. She is the 2011 and 2012 South American all-around champion and a three-time Pan American Championships medalist. She was selected to compete at the 2012 Summer Olympics but withdrew due to injury.

== Gymnastics career ==
As a child, Gomes began training at the State Sports Training Center (CETE) in Rio Grande do Sul. After taking part in a school cup at the Grêmio Náutico União, she ended up being called up to the club's team. In 2005, she got her first chance to join the Brazilian women's artistic gymnastics team, but was dismissed after being accused of indiscipline and weight problems. After suffering injuries in 2007, she quit her gymnastics career and started working in a coffee shop after finishing high school. It was in 2009 that she was invited to return to Grêmio Náutico União to complete the team for the Brazilian Championships. In 2010, she returned to the Brazilian national team.

Gomes made her debut at the 2010 Ghent World Cup and finished fourth on the balance beam. She helped Brazil win the team bronze medal at the 2010 Pan American Championships, behind the United States and Canada. At the 2010 World Championships, she helped the Brazilian team finish tenth in the qualifications, two spots away from the team final.

Gomes won a team gold medal at the 2011 South American Championships and also won the individual all-around title. She won two more gold medals in the vault and balance beam finals. She then won a bronze medal on the vault at the 2011 Ghent World Cup, behind Jade Barbosa and Valeria Maksyuta. She competed at the 2011 World Championships with the team that finished 14th in the qualifications. She then represented Brazil at the 2011 Pan American Games, where Brazil finished fifth in the team competition. Individually, she finished fourth in the vault final and twelfth in the all-around final.

Gomes competed with the team that placed fourth at the 2012 Olympic Test Event, securing the final team berth for the 2012 Summer Olympics. She then competed at the 2012 Pan American Championships and won a silver medal on the balance beam and a bronze medal on the vault. She was initially selected to represent Brazil at the 2012 Summer Olympics. However, days before the competition began, she developed a spinal injury in her L3 vertebrae and was replaced with Harumy de Freitas. She recovered in time to compete at the 2012 South American Championships, where she successfully defended her all-around title. She won additional gold medals on the uneven bars, balance beam, and floor exercise.

Gomes competed at the 2013 Anadia World Challenge Cup and won a bronze medal on the vault. This marked the final competition of her career, as she retired in 2014 due to ongoing back injuries.
