= Grace McLaughlin =

American artistic gymnast

- Full name: Grace Taylor McLaughlin
- Born: September 5, 1995 (age 31) California, U.S.

Gymnastics career
- Discipline: Women's artistic gymnastics
- Country represented: United States (2011–12 (USA))
- College team: Florida Gators (2014-18)
- Club: Brandy Johnson's Global Gymnastics (2014); WOGA (2007-2013)
- Head coach: Rhonda Faehn
- Former coaches: Valeri Liukin (2008-2013); Brandy Johnson, Kelly Pitzen (2013-2014)
- Retired: May 30, 2018
- Education: University of Florida, Bachelors degree; Nova Southeastern University, Master of Public Health; Gannon University, Master of Physician Assistant Studies

Grace Taylor McLaughlin (born September 5, 1995) is a retired American artistic gymnast that competed for the Florida Gators women's gymnastics team. Grace did not only excel on the competition floor, but also outside in her community. Grace spent 670 hours of community service with multiple non-profits including Florida Diabetes Camp, Dream Team and the athletic Goodwill Gators volunteering organization. Her desire to help others and her compassion for furthering the education of children and youth won her the 2018 SEC Brad Davis Community Service Scholarship for her graduate school studies. This scholarship is awarded to one female and one male athlete each year from all athletes competing in the Southeastern Conference. Grace is among two students who have received this award from the University of Florida.

Grace graduated from the University of Florida with a degree in Family, Youth and Community Sciences and a minor in Educational studies. She continued her graduate studies at Nova Southeastern University and graduated with a Master of Public Health in 2021.

Grace graduated from Gannon University Master of Physician Assistant Studies in the program's 2023 cohort.

Grace is currently completing a Pediatric Surgical Residency at Nemours Children's Hospital.

== Elite career ==
Prior to her collegiate career, Grace was an international elite gymnast. In 2011, she was selected to represent the U.S. at the 2011 Pan American Games. She took home a team gold medal.

== College career ==
In fall 2014, McLaughlin started at the University of Florida. She competed for the Gators team from 2015 to 2018.

=== 2015 season: Freshman ===
As a freshman in 2015, McLaughlin made her collegiate debut at the UF v Arkansas meet on February 6, 2015, on the beam, scoring 9.775.

Grace completed her Freshman year competing at the 2015 NCAA National Championships. Grace is a part of the winning 2015 NCAA National Championship Gator Gymnastics team.

During her successful sophomore season, Grace was a part of the winning 2016 SEC Championship Gator gymnastic team.
