= Bruna Leal =

Brazilian artistic gymnast (born 1993)

- Full name: Bruna Kuroiwa Yamamoto Leal
- Born: 24 April 1993 (age 33) Belém, Brazil

Gymnastics career
- Discipline: Women's artistic gymnastics
- Country represented: Brazil (2009–2012)
Medal record
Women's artistic gymnastics
Representing Brazil
Pan American Championships
Bronze medal – third place	2010 Guadalajara	Team
South American Games
Gold medal – first place	2010 Medellín	Team
Silver medal – second place	2010 Medellín	All-around
Silver medal – second place	2010 Medellín	Balance beam
Silver medal – second place	2010 Medellín	Floor exercise
Bronze medal – third place	2010 Medellín	Uneven bars
South American Championships
Gold medal – first place	2011 Santiago	Team
Silver medal – second place	2011 Santiago	All-around
Silver medal – second place	2011 Santiago	Floor exercise
Event	1st	2nd	3rd
FIG World Cup	0	0	1
Total	0	0	1

Bruna Kuroiwa Yamamoto Leal (born 24 April 1993) is a Brazilian former artistic gymnast who represented Brazil at the 2012 Summer Olympics. She won five medals at the 2010 South American Games and three medals at the 2011 South American Championships.

== Gymnastics career ==
Leal competed at the 2009 World Championships and advanced into the all-around final in 23rd place. In the final, she increased the difficulty value of her routines and finished 14th. Later that year, she won a bronze medal on the uneven bars at the Stuttgart World Cup, behind Kim Bui and Marta Pihan-Kulesza. She also competed in the floor exercise final and finished fourth.

At the 2010 South American Games, Leal helped Brazil win the team title. She won a silver medal in the all-around, behind Jessica López. She won two more silver medals on the balance beam and floor exercise and won a bronze medal on the uneven bars. She then won a team bronze medal at the 2010 Pan American Championships. She then competed at the 2010 World Championships, where Brazil finished tenth in the qualifications, two spots away from the team final.

At the 2011 South American Championships, Leal won a team gold medal and also won the all-around silver medal, behind teammate Adrian Gomes. She also won a silver medal on the floor exercise, behind Jessica Gil Ortiz. She then competed at the 2011 World Championships, and Brazil finished 14th in the qualifications. She also competed at the 2011 Pan American Games, where Brazil finished fifth in the team event. She withdrew from the all-around final due to a foot injury.

Leal competed with the team that placed fourth at the 2012 Olympic Test Event and secured the final team berth for the 2012 Summer Olympics. She was selected to represent Brazil at the 2012 Summer Olympics. She competed in the all-around but fell off the uneven bars and did not advance into the final. The Brazilian team finished 12th and did not advance into the team final. She retired from competition after competing at the Olympics.
