= Laís Souza =

Brazilian artistic gymnast

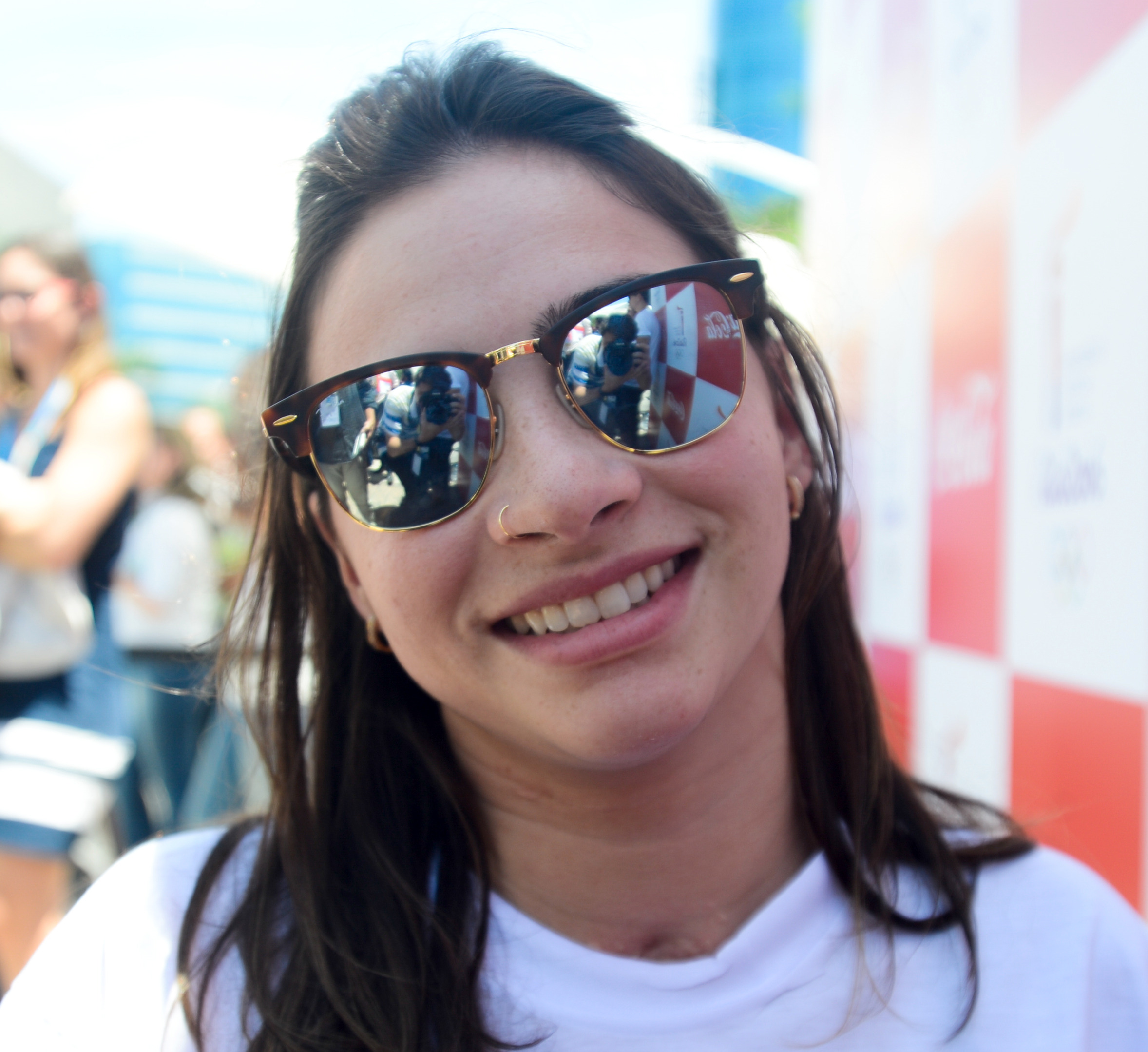
- Souza in 2016

Personal information
- Full name: Lais da Silva Souza
- Born: December 13, 1988 (age 37) Ribeirão Preto, São Paulo, Brazil
- Height: 156 cm (5 ft 1 in)

Gymnastics career
- Discipline: Women's artistic gymnastics
- Country represented: Brazil
- Club: Esporte Clube Pinheiros
- Head coach: Oleg Ostapenko
- Choreographer: Nadejda Ostapenko
- Retired: 2013
Medal record
Representing Brazil
Artistic Gymnastics
World Cup Final
Silver medal – second place	2006 São Paulo	Vault
Bronze medal – third place	2006 São Paulo	Floor exercise
Pan American Games
Silver medal – second place	2007 Rio de Janeiro	Team
Bronze medal – third place	2003 Santo Domingo	Team
Bronze medal – third place	2007 Rio de Janeiro	Vault
Bronze medal – third place	2007 Rio de Janeiro	Uneven bars
Pan American Championships
Silver medal – second place	2005 Rio de Janeiro	Team
Bronze medal – third place	2005 Rio de Janeiro	All-around
Bronze medal – third place	2005 Rio de Janeiro	Vault
South American Games
Gold medal – first place	2002 Curitiba	Team

Laís da Silva Souza (born December 13, 1988) is a Brazilian former artistic gymnast and aerial skier. Souza represented Brazilian gymnastics team internationally from 2003 to 2008 and helped the Brazilian team qualify for two Summer Olympic Games. In 2013, she took up the winter sport of freestyle skiing, and qualified in the aerials event for the 2014 Winter Olympics, but was paralyzed in an accident during training weeks before the Olympics.

== Gymnastics career ==
=== 2003–2004 ===
Lais da Silva Souza's first important competition on the Brazilian team was in the 2003 Pan American Games, where Brazil placed third in team competition, behind Team USA and Team Canada. That same year, in the 2003 World Artistic Gymnastics Championships, she was on the Brazilian team that qualified for the 2004 Summer Olympics. Team Brazil placed eighth overall in the 2003 World Artistic Gymnastics Championships. In her first Olympic Games, Team Brazil place ninth overall and da Silva Souza scored 9.387 on vault, 8.762 on bars, 9.375 on beam and 8.675 on floor.

=== 2005–2008 ===
In 2005, she competed in the São Paulo World Cup scoring 15.112, placing second on vault. Cheng Fei was the gold medalist (15.6) and Elena Zamolodchikova was the bronze medalist (14.875). Souza took part in 2006 World Artistic Gymnastics Championships and placed fourth on vault, scoring 14.987. Oksana Chusovitina was the bronze medalist (15.1), Alicia Sacramone was the silver medalist (15.325) and Cheng Fei was the gold medalist (15.712). She was also eighth on floor (14.75) and Brazil was seventh in team competition. In 2006, she was the Brazilian Sportswoman of the Year. In 2007, Laís won 3 medals in the 2007 Pan American Games. Brazil placed second in the team final, behind Team USA. She was third on vault (14.650) and bars (15.050). She also helped the Brazilian team to qualify an entire team for the Summer Olympics for the second time at the 2007 World Artistic Gymnastics Championships. In the 2008 Summer Olympics Brazil placed eighth in the team final, the best team result for Brazil so far. Her best individual result during that Olympics was 26th on bars (14.775).

=== 2011–2012 ===
Souza returned to competition in 2011 after a three-year break during which she worked on recovering from injuries. After several knee surgeries, she resumed her training and was named to her third Olympic team in June 2012. Just weeks before the Games, Souza suffered an injury to her hand during a training session on bars and was forced to withdraw from competition. She was replaced by Ethiene Franco.

== Skiing career ==
=== 2014 ===
In 2014, it was announced that Souza would compete for Brazil as an aerial skier at the 2014 Olympic Games. While training in Park City, Utah on January 28, 2014, she suffered a neck injury after hitting a tree. The Brazilian Olympic Committee announced that she was unable to move her arms or legs following the accident, though she was awake and able to follow commands, and that she sustained "severe trauma". She was initially treated at the University of Utah Medical Center in Salt Lake City, Utah. Because of the injury, Souza was not able to compete in the 2014 Sochi Winter Olympic Games. She had only been skiing for six months prior to the injury, though her relative inexperience did not play a role in the accident. Souza initially relied on a breathing machine; the tube was moved from her mouth to her neck to make her more comfortable. She could not talk, but had the ability to nod when asked questions. Souza was later moved to Jackson Memorial Hospital in Miami, Florida and no longer relied on a breathing machine, though she was still unable to move or feel her limbs. Souza is paralyzed from the neck down and is learning to use an electric wheelchair. After requesting help in learning to speak English so she could communicate with her doctors, the Brazilian Olympic Committee provided her with a teacher from Education First. She underwent a treatment with stem cells at Miami Project to Cure Paralysis. After that, she regained some sensation in parts of her feet and legs.

== Personal life ==
In February 2015, she came out as gay in an interview for Brazilian magazine TPM, saying: "I have a girlfriend, I've been gay for some years. I had some boyfriends, but I'm gay now".

== Results ==
2003

- Bronze Medal, team, 2003 Pan American Games. Santo Domingo, Dominican Republic.
- 4th, vault, 2003 Pan American Games. Santo Domingo, Dominican Republic.
- 8th, team, 2003 World Artistic Gymnastics Championships. Anaheim, California.

2004

- 9th, team, 2004 Olympic Games. Athens, Greece.

2005

- Silver Medal, vault, World Cup. São Paulo, Brazil.

2006

- 7th, team, 2006 World Artistic Gymnastics Championships. Aarhus, Denmark.
- 4th, vault, 2006 World Artistic Gymnastics Championships. Aarhus, Denmark.
- 8th, floor, 2006 World Artistic Gymnastics Championships. Aarhus, Denmark.

2007

- Silver Medal, team, 2007 Panamerican Games. Rio de Janeiro, Brazil.
- Bronze Medal, vault, 2007 Panamerican Games. Rio de Janeiro, Brazil.
- Bronze Medal, uneven bars, 2007 Panamerican Games. Rio de Janeiro, Brazil.
- 5th, team, 2007 World Artistic Gymnastics Championships. Stuttgart, Germany.

2008

- 8th, team, 2008 Olympic Games. Beijing, China.

Awards
Preceded by Natália Falavigna	Brazilian Sportswomen of the Year; 2006	Succeeded by Jade Barbosa
