= Daiane dos Santos =

Brazilian artistic gymnast (born 1983)

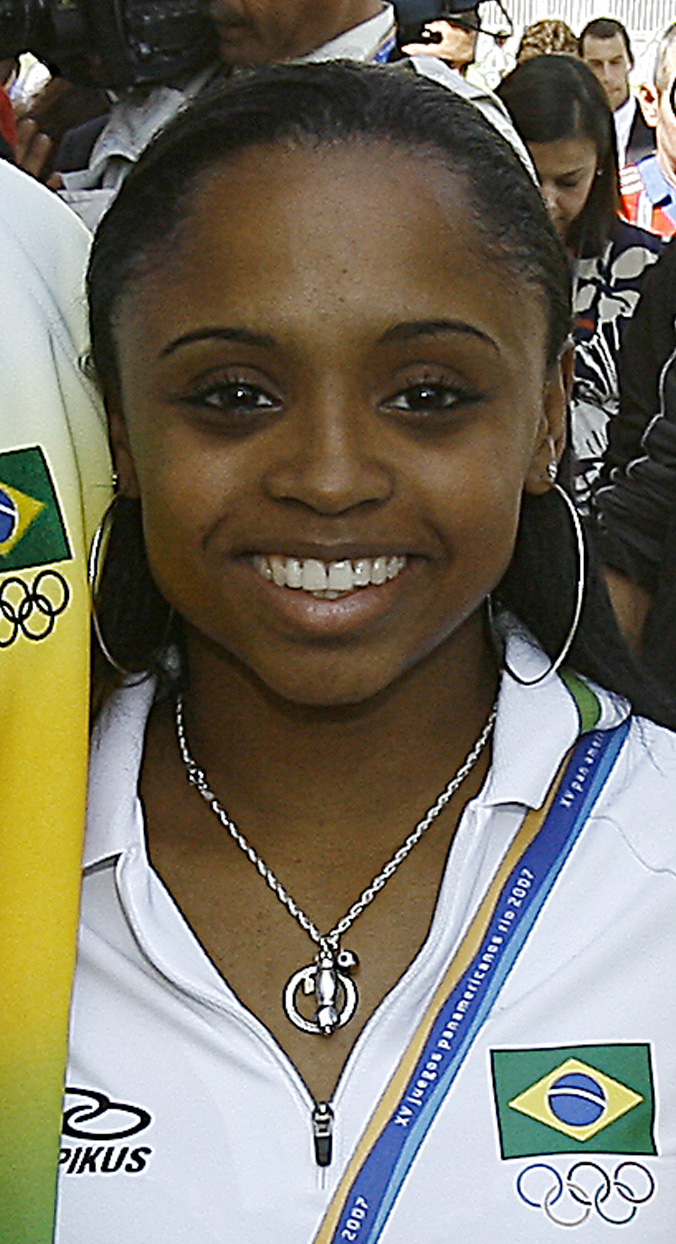
- dos Santos in 2007

Personal information
- Full name: Daiane Garcia dos Santos
- Nickname: Dai
- Born: February 10, 1983 (age 43) Porto Alegre, Rio Grande do Sul
- Height: 145 cm (4 ft 9 in)

Gymnastics career
- Discipline: Women's artistic gymnastics
- Country represented: Brazil (1998–2013)
- Club: Grêmio Náutico União
- Head coach: Oleg Ostapenko
- Assistant coach: Iryna Ilyashenko
- Choreographer: Nadejda Ostapenko
- Eponymous skills: Dos Santos I Dos Santos II
- Retired: 2013
Medal record
Representing Brazil
Women's artistic gymnastics
Event	1st	2nd	3rd
World Championships	1	0	0
World Cup Final	2	0	0
FIG World Challenge Cup	0	0	1
Total	3	0	1
World Championships
Gold medal – first place	2003 Anaheim	Floor Exercise
World Cup Final
Gold medal – first place	2004 Birmingham	Floor Exercise
Gold medal – first place	2006 São Paulo	Floor Exercise
Universiade
Gold medal – first place	2005 Izmir	Floor Exercise
Silver medal – second place	2001 Beijing	Floor Exercise
Pan American Games
Silver medal – second place	1999 Winnipeg	Vault
Silver medal – second place	2007 Rio de Janeiro	Team
Bronze medal – third place	1999 Winnipeg	Floor Exercise
Bronze medal – third place	1999 Winnipeg	Team
Bronze medal – third place	2003 Santo Domingo	Team
Pan American Championships
Gold medal – first place	2001 Cancún	Floor Exercise
Silver medal – second place	2001 Cancún	Team
Bronze medal – third place	2001 Cancún	Vault
South American Games
Gold medal – first place	1998 Cuenca	Team
Gold medal – first place	1998 Cuenca	Vault
Bronze medal – third place	1998 Cuenca	Floor Exercise

Daiane Garcia dos Santos (born February 10, 1983) is a retired Brazilian artistic gymnast. She is the 2003 world champion on the floor apparatus. On doing so, she became the first black gymnast to ever win an event at the World Championships as well as the first Brazilian and South American to win the competition. She represented Brazil at the 2004, 2008, and 2012 Summer Olympics. Widely regarded as the most powerful tumbler of her generation by critics and fellow competitors alike, the gymnast had two eponymous skills added on the FIG code of points after being the first woman to compete them at international championships. Dos Santos I, an F rated element, and Dos Santos II, an H rated element on the 2017–2020 COP.

== Gymnastics career ==
Dos Santos was born in Porto Alegre, and began gymnastics when she was 12, later than most elite gymnasts, after a coach spotted her on a playground. She advanced quickly, becoming the South American champion within four years.

=== 2003–04 ===
Daiane's breakthrough came at the 2003 World Artistic Gymnastics Championships in Anaheim, California, US. There, she won the gold medal on floor exercise, defeating Romania's Cătălina Ponor, who would become the Olympic champion on the event the following year. She opened her routine with a piked double Arabian: a half twist into a double front flip in a piked position. Because she was the first to perform the skill in World Championships or Olympic competition, it was named after her in the Code of Points.

At the 2004 Summer Olympics in Athens, Dos Santos qualified for the floor exercise event final and became the first female gymnast to perform a laid-out double Arabian. The skill, now known as the Dos Santos II, was the second to be named after her. However, in the final, she went out of bounds on a tumbling pass and placed fifth.

In December 2004, she became the World Cup floor champion, again beating Ponor.

=== 2005–06 ===
At the 2005 World Championships in Melbourne, Dos Santos tried to defend her floor title, but underrotated her first tumbling pass and fell, scoring an 8.837 and placing 7th.

In 2006, she debuted a new floor routine to the music "Isto aqui o que é?" by Ary Barroso. With this program, she won her first gold medal under the new Code of Points at the Moscow World Cup.

At the 2006 World Championships, she placed 4th in the floor final. She also qualified for the World Cup Final, where she defended her floor exercise title and placed 7th on uneven bars.

=== 2007 ===
Dos Santos's first competition of 2007 was the Ghent World Cup in May. She competed in the floor and uneven bars event finals, placing 8th on bars and winning the bronze on floor. In June, she won a gold medal on floor at a tri-meet competition in Natal, in which Brazil competed against Great Britain and Canada.

In July 2007, Dos Santos injured her ankle. She competed at the Pan American Games despite the injury. She qualified for the floor event final, but chose not to compete in order to avoid a worse injury that could keep her out of the 2007 World Championships in Stuttgart.

At the World Championships, Dos Santos was still not fully recovered, but she helped the Brazilian team place fifth and qualify for the 2008 Olympics in Beijing.

=== 2008 ===
Dos Santos underwent six months of intensive treatment after the 2007 World Championship and returned to competition at the 2008 World Cups in Cottbus and Tianjin, placing 4th on floor at both. In preparation for the Olympics, she decided along with coach Oleg Ostapenko to bring back her 2004–05 floor music, the crowd-pleasing Brasileirinho. In June, she competed with the Brazilian team at friendly meets in Europe, where she performed the Dos Santos II for the first time since the 2004 Olympics.

In August, Dos Santos competed at her second Olympic Games, this time sharing the spotlight with newcomer Jade Barbosa, an all-around bronze medalist at the 2007 World Championships. She helped Brazil reach its first-ever Olympic team final, and made the individual floor exercise final with a score of 15.275. Brazil finished 7th in the team final, and Dos Santos placed 6th on floor after going out of bounds twice.

=== 2009–12 ===
Dos Santos tested positive for the banned drug furosemide in July 2009 and received a five-month ban.

Her next major success was at the 2011 Ghent World Cup, where she won the bronze medal on floor. Shortly after that, she competed at the 2011 World Championships in Tokyo. The Brazilian team placed 14th, and Dos Santos finished 26th on floor with a score of 13.758. Some days later, she competed in the Pan American Games. She placed 5th with the Brazilian team, but did not make the floor final because she fell during qualifications.

In January 2012, Dos Santos helped Brazil place 4th at the Olympic Test Event in London and won the bronze medal in the floor final, with a score of 14.066. At the 2012 Olympics, she did not qualify for any finals.

== Eponymous skills ==
Dos Santos has two eponymous skills listed in the Code of Points.

Apparatus	Name	Description	Difficulty (Note: Valid for the 2025–2028 Code of Points)
Floor exercise	Dos Santos I	Arabian double salto piked	F (0.6)
Floor exercise	Dos Santos II	Arabian double salto stretched	H (0.8)

== Personal life ==
In 2022, she performed disguised as a bear in the reality singing competition The Masked Singer Brasil.

== Results ==
1998

- Canberra Cup (Canberra) — 1st, floor exercise

1999

- Pan American Games (Winnipeg) — 2nd, vault; 3rd, floor; 3rd, team

2001

- Pan American Games (Cancún) — 1st, floor
- World Cup (Ghent) — 5th, floor

2003

- World Cup (Cottbus) — 3rd, floor; 5th, uneven bars
- Pan American Games (Santo Domingo) — 3rd, team
- World Cup (Paris) — 4th, floor
- World Cup (Stuttgart) — 1st, floor; 5th, vault; 6th, uneven bars
- World Artistic Gymnastics Championships (Anaheim) — 1st, floor

2004

- World Cup (Rio de Janeiro) — 1st, floor; 4th, vault
- World Cup (Birmingham) — 1st, floor
- World Cup (Lyon) — 1st, floor; 2nd, vault
- World Cup (Cottbus) — 1st, floor; 4th, vault
- World Cup (Stuttgart) — 3rd, floor
- 2004 Summer Olympics (Athens) — 5th, floor

2005

- World Cup (São Paulo) — 1st, floor
- World Cup (Paris) — 1st, floor
- World Artistic Gymnastics Championships (Melbourne) — 7th, floor

2006

- World Artistic Gymnastics Championships (Aarhus) — 4th (tie), floor
- World Cup Final (São Paulo) — 1st, floor; 7th, uneven bars

2007

- World Cup (Ghent) — 3rd, floor; 8th, uneven bars
- BRA–GBR–CAN tri-meet (Natal) — 1st, floor; 1st, team
- Pan American Games (Rio de Janeiro) — 2nd, team

2008

- World Cup (Cottbus) — 4th, floor
- World Cup (Tianjin) — 4th, floor
- 2008 Olympic Games (Beijing) — 6th, floor; 7th, team

2011

- World Cup (Ghent) — 3rd, floor
- World Artistic Gymnastics Championships (Tokyo) — 14th, team
- Pan American Games (Guadalajara) — 5th, team

2012

- Olympic Test Event (London) — 3rd, floor; 4th, team

== Floor routines ==
2003 World Championships

Music: "Rumba para los Rumberos"; Start Value: 10.0

Round-off + back handspring + piked double Arabian (Dos Santos I); round-off + back handspring + double layout; double turn; tour jeté 1/1; front pike + round-off + back handspring + tucked double Arabian; cat leap 2/1 + Popa 3/2; round-off + back handspring + double pike.

2004 Olympic Games

Music: "Brasileirinho"; S.V.: 10.00

Round-off + back handspring + laid-out double Arabian (Dos Santos II); round-off + back handspring + piked double Arabian (Dos Santos I); double turn; tour jeté 1/1; round-off + back handspring + double layout; cat leap 3/2 + cat leap 1/1; front pike + round-off + back handspring + double pike.

2006 World Cup Final

Music: "Isto aqui o que é?"; Difficulty: 6.4

Round-off + back handspring + full-twisting double layout; front pike + round-off + back handspring + piked double Arabian (Dos Santos I); double turn with leg at horizontal; jump 1/1 with leg at horizontal + tour jeté 1/1; switch leap + switch side leap + tour jeté; front pike + round-off + back handspring + double pike.

2008 Olympic Games

Music: "Brasileirinho"; Difficulty: 6.4

Round-off + back handspring + full-twisting double layout; round-off + back handspring + laid-out double Arabian (Dos Santos II); double turn; switch leap + tour jeté 1/2 + tour jeté 1/1; round-off, back handspring, double layout; double leap + leap jump; front pike + round-off + back handspring + double pike.

2011 World Championships

Music: "Mix of Latin Rhythms"; Difficulty: 5.9

Round-off + back handspring + full-twisting double layout; round-off + back handspring + piked double Arabian (Dos Santos I); full turn with leg at horizontal; tour jeté 1/2; front pike + round-off + back handspring + double pike; leap jump + tour jeté 1/1; switch leap; round-off + back handspring + double layout.

Awards
Preceded by Daniele Hypólito	Brazilian Sportswomen of the Year; 2003, 2004	Succeeded by Natália Falavigna
