= Khiuani Dias =

Brazilian artistic gymnast (born 1992)

- Full name: Khiuani Luana Dias
- Born: 20 March 1992 (age 34) Pinhais, Paraná

Gymnastics career
- Discipline: Women's artistic gymnastics
- Country represented: Brazil (2006-2009)
Medal record
Pan American Games
Silver medal – second place	2007 Rio de Janeiro	Team
South American Games
Gold medal – first place	2006 Buenos Aires	Team
Bronze medal – third place	2006 Buenos Aires	All-Around
South American Championships
Gold medal – first place	2009 Sogamoso	Team
Gold medal – first place	2009 Sogamoso	Uneven Bars
Bronze medal – third place	2009 Sogamoso	All-Around

Khiuani Luana Dias (born 20 March 1992) is a Brazilian female artistic gymnast, representing her nation at international competitions. She participated at the 2007 and 2009 World Artistic Gymnastics Championships in London, Great Britain.

== Khiuani's career ==
Khiuani began her career in gymnastics under the guidance of coach Oleg Ostapenko and his assistant Irina Ilyiaschenko. Her first major competition was the Rio-2007 Pan American Games. Making a good debut at the event, she helped her team to second place in the team competition, behind the gold medal-winning American team. Qualified for the final of the all-around competition, she finished ninth, in a race won by American Shawn Johnson.

At the World Championships in Stuttgart, Khiuani, along with Jade Barbosa, Ana Silva, Daiane dos Santos, Daniele Hypolito and Lais Souza, took fifth place in the team competition, Brazil's best ever finish. This earned the Brazilian team a place at the Beijing Olympics. Training for the first time to be part of the team that would compete in the Games, Khiuani was injured a few weeks before the event, so she couldn't be part of the Olympic team, and was replaced by Ethiene Franco, also a rookie.
