= Gymnastics at the 2011 Pan American Games – Women's rhythmic individual all-around =

Women's rhythmic individual all-around at the 2011 Pan American Games
- Venue: Nissan Gymnastics Stadium
- Dates: October 15
- Competitors: 16 from 10 nations

Medalists
Gold medal	Julie Zetlin	United States
Silver medal	Cynthia Valdez	Mexico
Bronze medal	Angélica Kvieczynski	Brazil

The individual All-Around competition of the rhythmic gymnastics events at the 2011 Pan American Games was held on October 15 at the Nissan Gymnastics Stadium. The draw for the competition took place on August 1, 2011 in Guadalajara. The defending Pan American Games champion was Lisa Wang of the United States, while the defending Pan American Championship, champion was Julie Zetlin also of the United States.

== Schedule ==
All times are Central Standard Time (UTC-6).

Date	Time	Round
October 15, 2011	16:00	Hoop/ball
October 15, 2011	18:00	Clubs/ribbon

== Results ==
Rank	Athlete	Nationality	Hoop (rhythmic gymnastics)	Ball (rhythmic gymnastics)	Clubs (rhythmic gymnastics)	Ribbon (rhythmic gymnastics)	Total
1st place, gold medalist(s)	Julie Zetlin	United States	25.400	24.925	25.300	25.225	100.850
2nd place, silver medalist(s)	Cynthia Valdez	Mexico	25.025	25.525	24.250	25.525	100.325
3rd place, bronze medalist(s)	Angélica Kvieczynski	Brazil	25.075	24.375	24.700	24.050	98.200
4	Mariam Chamilova	Canada	24.550	23.175	24.225	23.225	95.175
5	Darya Shara	Argentina	23.825	23.000	23.600	23.800	94.225
6	Maria Kitkarska	Canada	23.350	23.825	22.850	23.400	93.425
7	Shelby Kisiel	United States	22.225	22.925	24.800	22.550	92.500
8	Ana Carrasco Pini	Argentina	23.525	23.575	21.600	23.600	92.300
9	Andreina Acevedo	Venezuela	24.150	21.850	22.475	23.750	92.225
10	Natalia Gaudio	Brazil	23.850	22.525	21.400	22.950	90.725
11	Dailen Cutino	Cuba	21.150	22.625	22.900	23.000	89.675
12	Katherin Arias	Venezuela	21.875	21.775	22.450	22.250	88.350
13	Linda Sandoval	Guatemala	21.800	19.175	21.250	20.400	82.625
14	Carolina Velez	Colombia	21.275	20.150	20.150	20.050	81.625
15	Valeska Gonzalez	Chile	19.950	20.350	20.575	19.325	80.200
16	Danays Perez	Cuba	21.925	18.250	20.450	19.150	79.775
