= Gymnastics at the 2011 Pan American Games – Women's rhythmic individual ribbon =

Women's rhythmic individual ribbon at the 2011 Pan American Games
- Venue: Nissan Gymnastics Stadium
- Dates: October 18
- Competitors: 8 from 6 nations

Medalists
Gold medal	Julie Zetlin	United States
Silver medal	Cynthia Valdez	Mexico
Bronze medal	Ana Carrasco Pini	Argentina

The rhythmic individual ribbon competition of the rhythmic gymnastics events at the 2011 Pan American Games was held on October 18 at the Nissan Gymnastics Stadium. The draw for the competition took place on August 1, 2011 in Guadalajara. The defending Pan American Games champion was Lisa Wang of the United States.

== Schedule ==
All times are Central Standard Time (UTC-6).

Date	Time	Round
October 17, 2011	16:35	Final

== Results ==
Rank	Athlete	Nationality	Ribbon (rhythmic gymnastics)
1st place, gold medalist(s)	Julie Zetlin	United States	25.775
2nd place, silver medalist(s)	Cynthia Valdez	Mexico	25.075
3rd place, bronze medalist(s)	Ana Carrasco Pini	Argentina	24.600
4	Darya Shara	Argentina	24.400
5	Mariam Chamilova	Canada	24.000
6	Angélica Kvieczynski	Brazil	23.825
7	Maria Kitkarska	Canada	23.050
8	Andreina Acevdeo	Venezuela	22.625
