= Nickolle Abreu =

Brazilian group rhythmic gymnast (born 1989)

- Born: 16 March 1989 (age 37)

Gymnastics career
- Discipline: Rhythmic gymnastics
- Country represented: Brazil (2005)
Medal record
Pan American Championships
Gold medal – first place	2005 Vitória	Groups all-around
Gold medal – first place	2005 Vitória	5 ribbons
Gold medal – first place	2005 Vitória	3 hoops + 4 clubs
South American Games
Gold medal – first place	2006 Buenos Aires	Group all-around
Gold medal – first place	2006 Buenos Aires	5 ribbons
Gold medal – first place	2006 Buenos Aires	3 hoops + 4 clubs

Nickolle Abreu (born 16 March 1989) is a Brazilian group rhythmic gymnast. She represents her nation at international competitions.

== Biography ==
Abreu became a senior in 2005, being incorporated into the national senior team. She was selected (along Larissa Evangelista, Luciane Hamme, Marcela Menezes, Nicole Muller and Natalia Sanchez) for the World Championships in Baku, being 17th in the All-Around. In November the group won gold overall, with 5 ribbon and with 3 hoops & 4 clubs at the Pan American Championships.

In 2006 Abreu, Daniela Leite, Luciane Hammes, Nicole Muller, Tayanne Mantovaneli and Marcela Menezes won 3 gold medals at the South American Games in Buenos Aires.

In 2017 she competed at the Summer Universiade in Taipei, being 30th in the All-Around.
