= Gymnastics at the 2011 Pan American Games – Women's rhythmic individual hoop =

Women's rhythmic individual hoop at the 2011 Pan American Games
- Venue: Nissan Gymnastics Stadium
- Dates: October 17
- Competitors: 8 from 6 nations

Medalists
Gold medal	Cynthia Valdez	Mexico
Silver medal	Julie Zetlin	United States
Bronze medal	Angélica Kvieczynski	Brazil

The rhythmic individual hoop competition of the rhythmic gymnastics events at the 2011 Pan American Games was held on October 17 at the Nissan Gymnastics Stadium. The draw for the competition took place on August 1, 2011, in Guadalajara. The defending Pan American Games champion was Alexandra Orlando of Canada, who has since retired.

== Schedule ==
All times are Central Standard Time (UTC-6).

Date	Time	Round
October 17, 2011	16:35	Final

== Results ==
Rank	Athlete	Nationality	Ball (rhythmic gymnastics)
1st place, gold medalist(s)	Cynthia Valdez	Mexico	25.800
2nd place, silver medalist(s)	Julie Zetlin	United States	25.500
3rd place, bronze medalist(s)	Angélica Kvieczynski	Brazil	25.000
4	Mariam Chamilova	Canada	24.100
5	Ana Carrasco Pini	Argentina	24.075
6	Darya Shara	Argentina	23.900
7	Natalia Gaudio	Brazil	23.575
8	Andreina Acevedo	Venezuela	22.900
