= Gymnastics at the 2011 Pan American Games – Women's rhythmic individual club =

Women's rhythmic individual club at the 2011 Pan American Games
- Venue: Nissan Gymnastics Stadium
- Dates: October 18
- Competitors: 8 from 6 nations

Medalists
Gold medal	Cynthia Valdez	Mexico
Silver medal	Angélica Kvieczynski	Brazil
Bronze medal	Mariam Chamilova	Canada

The rhythmic individual club competition of the rhythmic gymnastics events at the 2011 Pan American Games was held on October 18 at the Nissan Gymnastics Stadium. The draw for the competition took place on August 1, 2011 in Guadalajara. The defending Pan American Games champion was Alexandra Orlando of Canada, who has since retired.

== Schedule ==
All times are Central Standard Time (UTC-6).

Date	Time	Round
October 17, 2011	16:00	Final

== Results ==
Rank	Athlete	Nationality	Clubs (rhythmic gymnastics)
1st place, gold medalist(s)	Cynthia Valdez	Mexico	25.775
2nd place, silver medalist(s)	Angélica Kvieczynski	Brazil	25.150
3rd place, bronze medalist(s)	Mariam Chamilova	Canada	24.525
4	Darya Shara	Argentina	24.200
5	Julie Zetlin	United States	24.075
6	Maria Kitkarska	Canada	23.975
7	Shelby Kisiel	United States	23.300
8	Dailen Cutino	Cuba	22.600
