= Gymnastics at the 2011 Pan American Games – Women's rhythmic individual ball =

Women's rhythmic individual ball at the 2011 Pan American Games
- Venue: Nissan Gymnastics Stadium
- Dates: October 17
- Competitors: 8 from 5 nations

Medalists
Gold medal	Julie Zetlin	United States
Silver medal	Cynthia Valdez	Mexico
Bronze medal	Angélica Kvieczynski	Brazil

The rhythmic individual ball competition of the rhythmic gymnastics events at the 2011 Pan American Games was held on October 17 at the Nissan Gymnastics Stadium. The draw for the competition took place on August 1, 2011 in Guadalajara. This event was not contested at the last Pan American Games in 2007.

== Schedule ==
All times are Central Standard Time (UTC-6).

Date	Time	Round
October 17, 2011	16:00	Final

== Results ==
Rank	Athlete	Nationality	Ball (rhythmic gymnastics)
1st place, gold medalist(s)	Julie Zetlin	United States	24.950
2nd place, silver medalist(s)	Cynthia Valdez	Mexico	24.825
3rd place, bronze medalist(s)	Angélica Kvieczynski	Brazil	24.700
4	Mariam Chamilova	Canada	24.625
5	Shelby Kisiel	United States	24.300
6	Ana Carrasco Pini	Argentina	23.725
7	Maria Kitkarska	Canada	23.625
8	Darya Shara	Argentina	22.700
