= 2005 Pan American Gymnastics Championships =

International sports competition

The 2005 Pan American Gymnastics Championships were held in Brazil. Artistic gymnastics events were competed in Rio de Janeiro, October 6–9, 2005, while rhythmic gymnastics events were held in Vitória, November 11–13, 2005.

== Medalists ==
=== Artistic gymnastics ===
Event	Gold	Silver	Bronze
Men
Team all-around	United States; Guillermo Alvarez; Joseph Hagerty; Jonathan Horton; David Durante	Puerto Rico; Luis Rivera; Luis Vargas; Jose Ramos; Reinaldo Oquendo	Canada; Adam Wong; Brandon O'Neil; Grant Golding; Nathan Gafuik
Individual all-around	Abel Drigg (CUB)	Luis Vargas (PUR)	Mosiah Rodrigues (BRA)
Floor	Brandon O'Neill (CAN)	Guillermo Alvarez (USA)	Adam Wong (CAN)
Pommel horse	Luis Rivera (PUR)	Luis Vargas (PUR)	Abel Drigg (CUB)
Rings	Regulo Carmona (VEN)	Abel Drigg (CUB)	Luis Rivera (PUR)
Vault	Abel Drigg (CUB)	Fernando Fuentes (VEN)	Felipe Piña (CHI)
Parallel bars	Abel Drigg (CUB)	Adam Wong (CAN)	Grant Golding (CAN)
Horizontal bar	Mosiah Rodrigues (BRA)	Luis Vargas (PUR)	Joseph Hagerty (USA)
Women
Team all-around	United States; Chellsie Memmel; Alicia Sacramone; Jana Bieger; Bianca Flohr	Brazil; Daniele Hypólito; Laís Souza; Camila Comin; Jade Barbosa	Canada; Alyssa Brown; Aisha Gerber; Brittnee Habbib; Rebecca Simbhudas
Individual all-around	Chellsie Memmel (USA)	Daniele Hypólito (BRA)	Laís Souza (BRA)
Vault	Alicia Sacramone (USA)	Jana Bieger (USA)	Laís Souza (BRA)
Uneven bars	Chellsie Memmel (USA)	Daniele Hypólito (BRA)	Camila Comin (BRA)
Balance beam	Chellsie Memmel (USA)	Bianca Flohr (USA)	Alyssa Brown (CAN)
Floor	Alicia Sacramone (USA)	Daniele Hypólito (BRA)	Jana Bieger (USA)

=== Rhythmic gymnastics ===
Event	Gold	Silver	Bronze
Team all-around	United States; Olga Karmansky; Aline Bakchajian; Brenann Stacker; Lisa Wang	Brazil; Ana Paula Ribeiro; Ana Paula Scheffer; Luisa Matsuo; Mônica Rizzo	Mexico; Cynthia Valdez; Veronica Navarro; Ana Bucio; Rut Castillo
Individual all-around	Olga Karmansky (USA)	Cynthia Valdez (MEX)	Ana Paula Ribeiro (BRA)
Rope	Cynthia Valdez (MEX)	Ana Paula Scheffer (BRA)	Yenly Figueredo (CUB)
Ball	Cynthia Valdez (MEX)	Ana Paula Ribeiro (BRA)	Olga Karmansky (USA)
Clubs	Cynthia Valdez (MEX)	Olga Karmansky (USA)	Ana Paula Ribeiro (BRA)
Ribbon	Ana Paula Ribeiro (BRA)	Cynthia Valdez (MEX)	Olga Karmansky (USA)
Group all-around	Brazil; Nickolle Abreu; Nicole Muller; Natália Sanches; Larissa Evangelista; Luciane Hammes; Marcela Menezes	Cuba	Venezuela
Group 5 ribbons	Brazil; Nickolle Abreu; Nicole Muller; Natália Sanches; Larissa Evangelista; Luciane Hammes; Marcela Menezes	Canada	Cuba
Group 3 hoops + 4 clubs	Brazil; Nickolle Abreu; Nicole Muller; Natália Sanches; Larissa Evangelista; Luciane Hammes; Marcela Menezes	Cuba	Venezuela

== Medal table ==
Rank	Nation	Gold	Silver	Bronze	Total
1	United States (USA)	9	4	4	17
2	Brazil (BRA)	5	7	6	18
3	Cuba (CUB)	3	3	3	9
4	Mexico (MEX)	3	2	1	6
5	Puerto Rico (PUR)	1	4	1	6
6	Canada (CAN)	1	2	5	8
7	Venezuela (VEN)	1	1	2	4
8	Chile (CHI)	0	0	1	1
Totals (8 entries)		23	23	23	69
