= Rhythmic gymnastics at the 2010 Central American and Caribbean Games =

Rhythmic gymnastics at the Mayagüez 2010 Central American and Caribbean Games
- Venue: Coliseo Mayor "El Salitre"
- Location: Bogotá, Colombia
- Dates: 19–20 July 2010

§

The rhythmic gymnastics competition of the Mayagüez 2010 Central American and Caribbean Games was held 19–20 July 2010 at Coliseo Mayor "El Salitre" in Bogotá, Colombia.

== Medal summary ==
=== Women's events ===
Event	Gold		Silver		Bronze	
Team	Mexico; Yeraldine Alarcón; Rut Castillo; Veronica Navarro; Alejandra Vásquez		Venezuela; Andreina Acevedo; Katherine Arias; Leiyineth Medrano		Colombia; Laura Angarita; Wendy Cifuentes; Cindy Pérez; Carolina Vélez	
Individual All-Around	Rut Castillo; Mexico	102.225	Andreina Acevedo; Venezuela	99.450	Veronica Navarro; Mexico	97.150
Ball	Andreina Acevedo; Venezuela	25.725	Rut Castillo; Mexico	25.475	Veronica Navarro; Mexico	25.250
Hoop	Veronica Navarro; Mexico	24.675	Rut Castillo; Mexico Katherine Arias; Venezuela	24.200	None awarded	
Ribbon	Rut Castillo; Mexico	25.725	Katherine Arias; Venezuela	25.475	Andreina Acevedo; Venezuela	25.250
Rope	Andreina Acevedo; Venezuela	24.625	Rut Castillo; Mexico	24.625	Katherine Arias; Venezuela	23.225

== See also ==
- Artistic gymnastics at the 2010 Central American and Caribbean Games
- Trampoline at the 2010 Central American and Caribbean Games
