= 2004 Junior Pan American Rhythmic Gymnastics Championships =

International sports competition

The 2004 Junior Pan American Rhythmic Gymnastics Championships was held in San Salvador, El Salvador, October 14–18, 2004.

== Medal summary ==
Event	Gold	Silver	Bronze
Team	United States; Rachel Marmer; Julie Zetlin; Kristian Brooks	Canada; Juliana Semenova; Katia Zaitseva; Suzy Lendvay	Mexico; Sofia Sanchez; Ana Luisa Bucio; Beatriz Gamboa; Veronica Navarro
All-Around	Rachel Marmer (USA)	Julie Zetlin (USA)	Juliana Semenova (CAN)
Rope	Rachel Marmer (USA)	Beatriz Gamboa (MEX)	Sofia Sanchez (MEX)
Ball	Rachel Marmer (USA)	Ana Luisa Bucio (MEX)	Julie Zetlin (USA)
Clubs	Rachel Marmer (USA)	Juliana Semenova (CAN)	Yuka Solano (BRA)
Ribbon	Rachel Marmer (USA)	Julie Zetlin (USA)	Ana Luisa Bucio (MEX)

== Medal table ==
Rank	Nation	Gold	Silver	Bronze	Total
1	United States	6	2	1	9
2	Mexico	0	2	3	5
3	Canada	0	2	1	3
4	Brazil	0	0	1	1
Totals (4 entries)		6	6	6	18
