= Veronica Navarro =

Mexican rhythmic gymnast

- Full name: Veronica Alejandra Navarro Blizzard
- Born: September 8, 1990 (age 35)

Gymnastics career
- Discipline: Rhythmic gymnastics
- Country represented: Mexico; (2004-2011)
- Retired: yes
Medal record
Pan American Championships
Gold medal – first place	2010 Guadalajara	Ribbon
Silver medal – second place	2010 Guadalajara	Hoop
Silver medal – second place	2010 Guadalajara	Ball
Bronze medal – third place	2005 Vitória	Team
Bronze medal – third place	2010 Guadalajara	All-Around
Central American and Caribbean Games
Gold medal – first place	2006 Cartagena	Team
Gold medal – first place	2010 Mayagüez	Team
Gold medal – first place	2010 Mayagüez	Hoop
Bronze medal – third place	2010 Mayagüez	All-Around
Bronze medal – third place	2010 Mayagüez	Ball
Junior Pan American Championships
Bronze medal – third place	2004 San Salvador	Team

Veronica Alejandra Navarro Blizzard (born 8 September 1990) is a retired Mexican rhythmic gymnast. She represented her country in international competitions.

== Career ==
Veronica was part of the Mexican team, with Sofia Sanchez, Ana Luisa Bucio and Beatriz Gamboa, that won bronze at the 2004 Junior Pan American Championships in San Salvador.

In November 2005 she participated in her first competition as a senior, winning team bronze at the Pan American Championships along Cynthia Valdez, Ana Bucio and Rut Castillo.

At the 2006 Central American and Caribbean Games Navarro, Ruth Castillo and Cynthia Valdez won gold in the team competition.

In 2009 she was selected for the World Championships in Mie, ending 87th in the All-Around, 87th with hoop, 107th with ball and 74th with ribbon.

The following year she won gold in teams and hoop, bronze in the All-Around and with ball at the 2010 Central American and Caribbean Games. In September she competed again at the 2010 World Championships in Moscow, she was 18th in teams, 65th in the All-Around, 98th with rope, 42nd with hoop and 67th with ball. In December she took part in the 2010 Pan American Championships in Guadalajara, she won bronze in the All-Around, silver with ball and hoop and gold with ribbon.

In 2011 Veronica took 68th place overall, 83rd with hoop, 62ndwith ball, 62nd with clubs, 55th with ribbon and 17th in teams at the World Championships in Montpellier.
