= 2010 Pan American Gymnastics Championships =

International sports competition

The 2010 Pan American Gymnastics Championships were held in Guadalajara, Mexico. Artistic gymnastics events were competed on September 2–5, 2010, while rhythmic gymnastics events were competed on December 2–5, 2010. The competition was organized by the Mexican Gymnastics Federation and approved by the International Gymnastics Federation.

== Medalists ==
=== Artistic gymnastics ===
Event	Gold	Silver	Bronze
Men
Team all-around	United States; Dylan Akers; Alexander Buscaglia; Jacob Dalton; Brian del Castillo; Wesley Haagensen; Glen Ishino	Brazil; Felipe Polato; Mosiah Rodrigues; Sergio Eras; Péricles Silva; Danilo Nogueira; Sérgio Sasaki Canada; Kenneth Ikeda; Anderson Loran; Jayd Lukenchuk; Kevin Lytwyn; Jackson Payne; Casey Sandy	—N/a
Individual all-around	Daniel Corral (MEX)	Glen Ishino (USA)	Jorge Giraldo (COL)
Floor	Santiago López (MEX)	Tomás González (CHI)	Jacob Dalton (USA)
Pommel horse	Glen Ishino (USA)	Jorge Peña (MEX)	Casey Sandy (CAN)
Rings	Regulo Carmona (VEN)	Tommy Ramos (PUR)	Federico Molinari (ARG)
Vault	Tomás González (CHI)	Sérgio Sasaki (BRA)	Luis Rivera (PUR)
Parallel bars	Daniel Corral (MEX)	Kenneth Ikeda (CAN)	Jorge Giraldo (COL)
Horizontal bar	Alexander Buscaglia (USA)	José Luis Fuentes (VEN)	Wesley Haagensen (USA)
Women
Team all-around	United States; Gabby Douglas; Brenna Dowell; Kyla Ross; Sarah Finnegan; Sabrina Vega; McKayla Maroney	Canada; Bianca Dancose-Giambattisto; Coralie Leblond-Chartrand; Charlotte Mackie; Dominique Pegg; Jessica Savona; Kristina Vaculik	Brazil; Priscila Cobello; Ethiene Franco; Gabriela Soares; Bruna Leal; Daniele Hypólito; Adrian Gomes
Individual all-around	Kyla Ross (USA)	Sabrina Vega (USA)	Jessica López (VEN)
Vault	McKayla Maroney (USA)	Daniele Hypólito (BRA)	Jessica Gil (COL)
Uneven bars	Gabby Douglas (USA)	Jessica López (VEN)	Kristina Vaculik (CAN)
Balance beam	Sabrina Vega (USA)	Jessica López (VEN)	Sarah Finnegan (USA)
Floor	McKayla Maroney (USA)	Kyla Ross (USA)	Kristina Vaculik (CAN)

=== Rhythmic gymnastics ===
Note
In December 2010, Mexican gymnast Rut Castillo tested positive for sibutramine, a banned stimulant. On May 2, 2011, Castillo was stripped of the medals she had won at the 2010 Pan American Championships (team gold, hoop gold, rope silver), and all her results at the event have been nullified.

Event	Gold	Silver	Bronze
Team all-around	United States; Shelby Kisiel; Olga Pavlenko; Anastasia Torba; Julie Zetlin	Brazil; Natália Gaudio; Simone Luiz; Drielly Daltoe; Eliane Sampaio	Canada; Mariam Chamilova; Jessica Ho; Anastasiya Muntyanu
Individual all-around	Julie Zetlin (USA)	Cynthia Valdez (MEX)	Veronica Navarro (MEX)
Group all-around	Canada	Brazil; Luisa Matsuo; Ana Paula Ribeiro; Ana Paula Alencar; Leticia Dutra; Jessica Maier; Larissa Barata	Venezuela
Hoop	Veronica Navarro (MEX)	Mariam Chamilova (CAN)	Shelby Kisiel (USA)
Rope	Julie Zetlin (USA)	Eliane Sampaio (BRA)	Cynthia Valdez (MEX)
Ball	Julie Zetlin (USA)	Veronica Navarro (MEX)	Cynthia Valdez (MEX)
Ribbon	Veronica Navarro (MEX)	Shelby Kisiel (USA)	Julie Zetlin (USA)
Group 5 hoops	Canada	United States	Cuba
Group 3 ribbons / 2 ropes	Canada	United States	Cuba

== Medal table ==
Rank	Nation	Gold	Silver	Bronze	Total
1	United States (USA)	13	6	5	24
2	Mexico (MEX)	5	3	3	11
3	Canada (CAN)	3	4	4	11
4	Venezuela (VEN)	1	3	2	6
5	Chile (CHI)	1	1	0	2
6	Brazil (BRA)	0	6	1	7
7	Puerto Rico (PUR)	0	1	1	2
8	Colombia (COL)	0	0	3	3
9	Cuba (CUB)	0	0	2	2
10	Argentina (ARG)	0	0	1	1
Totals (10 entries)		23	24	22	69
