= Gymnastics at the 2006 Central American and Caribbean Games =

Gymnastics at the 2006 Central American and Caribbean Games may refer to:

- Artistic gymnastics at the 2006 Central American and Caribbean Games
- Rhythmic gymnastics at the 2006 Central American and Caribbean Games
