= Sean Golden =

American artistic gymnast

- Full name: Sean Golden
- Born: June 13, 1983 (age 43)
- Height: 5 ft 5 in (165 cm)

Gymnastics career
- Discipline: Men's artistic gymnastics
- Country represented: United States (2005–2009)
- Gym: Cypress Academy; Houston Gymnastics Academy; Team Chevron
- Head coach: Kevin Mazeika
- Retired: c. 2011
Medal record
Men's artistic gymnastics
Representing United States
Event	1st	2nd	3rd
Pan American Games	0	1	1
Total	0	1	1
Pan American Games
Silver medal – second place	2007 Rio de Janeiro	Rings
Bronze medal – third place	2007 Rio de Janeiro	Team

Sean Golden (born June 13, 1983) is a former American artistic gymnast and member of the United States men's national artistic gymnastics team.

== Early life and education ==
Golden was born as the youngest of six children to Patricia and Ron Golden, a police officer, and raised in Camden, New Jersey. Golden was introduced to gymnastics at four years old as an outlet for his energy after he fell in love with the sport after watching it on television. He quickly advanced within gymnastics, eventually being coached by Macey Watson. He was the 1994 New Jersey state champion on the floor routine and finished third in the state all-around in 1996 via a second-place finish on the floor and third-place finishes on the rings and vault.

Golden attended Camden High School and graduated in 2001. He later attended Camden County College, but dropped out of the latter to focus on gymnastics training and joined his former coach Watson in Florida.

== Gymnastics career ==
In 2004, Golden moved to Houston to work with former national team coach Kevin Mazeika. He failed to make the United States men's national artistic gymnastics team at the 2005 Winter Cup, but was successful in joining following the 2005 USA Gymnastics National Championships where he was the national champion for the rings and vault. He remained a fixture on every national team through the 2008 National Championships. Ultimately, he was not selected to the 2008 Summer Olympics team which saw two of his roommates, Kevin Tan and Raj Bhavsar, chosen in some capacity.

Internationally, Golden represented the United States at the 2007 Pan American Games and won a silver medal on the rings and a team bronze medal.

Golden's last competition was the 2011 Winter Cup.
