= Leticia Dutra =

Brazilian rhythmic gymnast

- Born: 22 June 1993 (age 33) Florianópolis, Santa Catarina

Gymnastics career
- Discipline: Rhythmic gymnastics
- Country represented: Brazil (2010)
Medal record
Pan American Championships
Silver medal – second place	2010 Guadalajara	Group all-around
South American Games
Gold medal – first place	2010 Medellín	Group all-around
Silver medal – second place	2010 Medellín	5 hoops
Silver medal – second place	2010 Medellín	3 ribbons + 2 ropes

Leticia Dutra (born 22 June 1993) is a Brazilian group rhythmic gymnast. She represents her nation at international competitions. She competed at world championships, including at the 2010 World Rhythmic Gymnastics Championships.
