= Daniela Leite =

Brazilian rhythmic gymnast

- Born: 20 April 1988 (age 38) Belo Horizonte, Minas Gerais

Gymnastics career
- Discipline: Rhythmic gymnastics
- Country represented: Brazil (2007-2008 (?))
Medal record
Pan American Games
Gold medal – first place	2007 Rio de Janeiro	Group all-around
Gold medal – first place	2007 Rio de Janeiro	5 ropes
Gold medal – first place	2007 Rio de Janeiro	3 hoops + 4 clubs
South American Games
Gold medal – first place	2006 Buenos Aires	Group all-around
Gold medal – first place	2006 Buenos Aires	5 ribbons
Gold medal – first place	2006 Buenos Aires	3 hoops + 4 clubs

Daniela Aleixo Leite Mazoni Siqueira (born 20 April 1988) is a Brazilian group rhythmic gymnast. She represents her nation at international competitions.

She participated at the 2008 Summer Olympics in Beijing. She also competed at world championships, including at the 2007 World Rhythmic Gymnastics Championships.

== See also ==
- List of Olympic rhythmic gymnasts for Brazil
