= Ana Paula Scheffer =

Brazilian rhythmic gymnast (1989–2020)

- Full name: Ana Paula Scheffer
- Born: August 18, 1989
- Died: October 16, 2020 (aged 31) Toledo, Paraná

Gymnastics career
- Discipline: Rhythmic gymnastics
- Country represented: Brazil (2005-2011)
Medal record
Pan American Games
Bronze medal – third place	2007 Rio de Janeiro	Hoop
Pan American Championships
Silver medal – second place	2005 Rio de Janeiro	Team
Silver medal – second place	2005 Rio de Janeiro	Rope
South American Games
Gold medal – first place	2010 Medellín	Group all-around
Silver medal – second place	2006 Buenos Aires	Team
Silver medal – second place	2006 Buenos Aires	Rope
Silver medal – second place	2006 Buenos Aires	Clubs
Silver medal – second place	2006 Buenos Aires	Ribbon
Silver medal – second place	2010 Medellín	5 hoops
Silver medal – second place	2010 Medellín	3 ribbons + 2 ropes

Ana Paula Scheffer (18 August 1989 – 16 October 2020) was a Brazilian individual rhythmic gymnast.

She represented her nation at international competitions. She competed at world championships, including at the 2009 World Rhythmic Gymnastics Championships.

Scheffer was discovered dead at her home in Toledo, Paraná suffering from heart attack on October 16, 2020, aged 31.
