= Todd Thornton =

American artistic gymnast (born 1982)

- Full name: Todd Thornton
- Born: October 14, 1982 (age 43)

Gymnastics career
- Discipline: Men's artistic gymnastics
- Country represented: United States; (2001–2008)
- Gym: Houston Gymnastics Academy; Team Texaco
- Head coach: Vitaly Marinich
- Assistant coaches: Alex Shchennikov, Kevin Mazeika
- Retired: c. 2007
Medal record
Men's artistic gymnastics
Representing United States
Event	1st	2nd	3rd
Pan American Games	0	0	1
Total	0	0	1
Pan American Games
Bronze medal – third place	2007 Rio de Janeiro	Team

Todd Thornton (born October 14, 1982) is a retired American artistic gymnast. He was a member of the United States men's national artistic gymnastics team and won a bronze medal while representing the United States at the 2007 Pan American Games. He was the all-around champion in the United States at the 2005 U.S. National Gymnastics Championships.

== Early life and education ==
Thornton was born October 14, 1982. He started gymnastics at seven years old. He spent most of his childhood in the Clear Lake, Texas area.

== Gymnastics career ==
He was one of the "Houston Six", a group of elite men's gymnasts based out of the Houston area in the early 2000s that made an impact for the United States internationally. In 1996, his family helped house teammate Sean Townsend.

Domestically, Thornton had strong showings at numerous Winter Cup events from 2001 through 2005. He also performed well at the national championships, culminating in being the United States all-around champion at the 2005 U.S. National Gymnastics Championships.

Internationally, Thornton represented the United States as an alternate for the 2001 World Artistic Gymnastics Championships team and participated at the 2005 World Artistic Gymnastics Championships. He won a team bronze medal at the 2007 Pan American Games. He retired after the event.

== Personal life ==
After retirement from gymnastics, Thornton began coaching. He worked in the Clear Lake, Texas area. He and his wife Kimberly opened a gym with a business partner in 2014. In 2016, they sold their portion and opened their own, Thornton's Gymnastics Center, in League City, Texas in August.
