= Aisha Gerber =

Canadian artistic gymnast

- Born: June 21, 1990 (age 36)

Gymnastics career
- Discipline: Women's artistic gymnastics
- Country represented: Canada
- Gym: Oakville Gymnastics Centre
Medal record
Pan American Championships
Bronze medal – third place	2005 Rio de Janeiro	Team
Pacific Rim Championships
Bronze medal – third place	2006 Honolulu	Team

Aisha Gerber (born June 21, 1990) is a world-class Canadian artistic gymnast.

Starting as a member of the Cambridge Kips gymnastics club at the age of three, Gerber was coached by former Soviet Olympic champion Elvira Saadi and Vladimir Kondratenko. Now a member of the Oakville Gymnastics Club, she is currently coached by Kelly and Sue Manjak (Kelly Manjak coached Kyle Shewfelt to his gold medal on floor at the 2004 Olympics). Gerber began competing at the national level in 2000, placing second in the novice division at the Canada Elite meet. In 2001, she won the novice division; in 2002 she became the Canadian junior national champion.

In 2003, at the age of thirteen, Gerber began competing internationally for Canada, placing 22nd at the Massila Cup. Over the next three years, Gerber represented Canada at various meets at home and abroad, including the 2005 Pan Am Championships where she was a member of the bronze medal-winning junior team.

Gerber made an impressive senior debut, winning a bronze medal behind Nastia Liukin and Shayla Worley at the 2006 American Cup. Beset by illness, she missed the 2006 Commonwealth Games, but returned to competition at the 2006 Pacific Alliance Championships in Hawaii in April, helping the Canadian women achieve a third-place finish in the team finals. She went on to compete at the World Cup finals in Ghent, placing fifth on the floor exercise and sixth on the balance beam. Her expressive floor exercise routine, set to music by Dire Straits, has attracted attention and praise from many commentators and members of the gymnastics community.

Gerber competed in the NCAA for UCLA. Gerber is now retired from competitive gymnastics.
