= Ana Paula de Alencar =

Brazilian rhythmic gymnast (born 1992)

- Born: 30 June 1992 (age 34) Paraná, Brazil

Gymnastics career
- Discipline: Rhythmic gymnastics
- Country represented: Brazil (2010)
Medal record
Pan American Championships
| Silver medal – second place | 2010 Guadalajara | Group all-around |
South American Games
| Gold medal – first place | 2010 Medellín | Group all-around |
| Silver medal – second place | 2010 Medellín | 5 hoops |
| Silver medal – second place | 2010 Medellín | 3 ribbons + 2 ropes |

Ana Paula de Alencar (born 30 June 1992) is a Brazilian group rhythmic gymnast. She represents her nation at international competitions. She competed at world championships, including at the 2010 World Rhythmic Gymnastics Championships.
