= Leiyineth Medrano =

Venezuelan rhythmic gymnast

- Full name: Leiyineth Medrano Rodriguez
- Born: 4 September 1994 (age 32)

Gymnastics career
- Country represented: Venezuela (2010-?)
- Retired: yes
Medal record
Representing Venezuela
South American Games
Gold medal – first place	2010 Medellín	5 Hoops
Gold medal – first place	2010 Medellín	3 Ribbons + 2 Ropes
Silver medal – second place	2010 Medellín	Group All-Around
Bronze medal – third place	2010 Medellín	Team
Central American and Caribbean Games
Silver medal – second place	2010 Mayagüez	Team

Leiyineth Medrano Rodriguez (born 4 September 1994) is a former Venezuelan rhythmic gymnast. She represented her country at international level.

== Career ==
In March 2010 Leiyineth won bronze in teams, silver in group All-Around and gold with 5 hoops and with 3 ribbons & 2 ropes at the South American Games in Medellin. In July she won team silver along Andreina Acevedo and Katherine Arias at the Central American and Caribbean Games. In September she was selected for the World Championships in Moscow, taking 115th place in the All-Around, 122nd with rope, 122nd with hoop, 108th with ball, 122nd with ribbon and 34th in teams. In December she was 6th in teams, 21st with hoop and 20th with ball, the two apparatuses she competed with, at the Pan American Championships.

As of early 2024 she's a physiotherapist, rhythmic gymnastics judge and coach.
