= Rhythmic gymnastics at the 2006 Central American and Caribbean Games =

- Dates: 15–30 July 2006

The rhythmic gymnastics competition of the 2006 Central American and Caribbean Games was held in Cartagena, Colombia from 15 to 30 July 2006.

== Medal summary ==
Event	Gold		Silver		Bronze	
Individual All-Around	Cynthia Valdez (MEX)	63.065	Ruth Castillo (MEX)	58.300	Lisandra Perez (CUB)	55.175
Team All-Around	Mexico; Ruth Castillo; Veronica Navarro; Cynthia Valdez	150.350	Cuba; Yenly Figueredo; Lisandra Perez; Lianet Jose	135.425	Venezuela; Andreina Acevedo; Catherine Cortez; Katerin Arias	129.575
Rope	Cynthia Valdez (MEX)	15.700	Lisandra Perez (CUB)	13.900	Ruth Castillo (MEX)	13.825
Clubs	Cynthia Valdez (MEX)	15.350	Andreina Acevedo (VEN)	13.950	Catherine Cortez (VEN)	13.825
Ribbon	Cynthia Valdez (MEX)	15.650	Andreina Acevedo (VEN)	13.775	Lisandra Perez (CUB)	13.300
Ball	Cynthia Valdez (MEX)	16.450	Ruth Castillo (MEX)	14.825	Andreina Acevedo (VEN)	14.750

== Medal table ==
Rank	Nation	Gold	Silver	Bronze	Total
1	Mexico	6	2	1	9
2	Venezuela	0	2	3	5
3	Cuba	0	2	2	4
Totals (3 entries)		6	6	6	18

== See also ==
- Artistic gymnastics at the 2006 Central American and Caribbean Games
