= Nicole Muller (gymnast, born 1989) =

Brazilian rhythmic gymnast

- Full name: Nicole Toledo Romme Muller
- Born: 27 February 1989 (age 37) Toledo, Paraná
- Height: 163 cm (5 ft 4 in)

Gymnastics career
- Discipline: Rhythmic gymnastics
- Country represented: Brazil (2005-2008 (?))
Medal record
Pan American Games
Gold medal – first place	2007 Rio de Janeiro	Group all-around
Gold medal – first place	2007 Rio de Janeiro	5 ropes
Gold medal – first place	2007 Rio de Janeiro	3 hoops + 4 clubs
Pan American Championships
Gold medal – first place	2005 Vitória	Groups all-around
Gold medal – first place	2005 Vitória	5 ribbons
Gold medal – first place	2005 Vitória	3 hoops + 4 clubs
South American Games
Gold medal – first place	2006 Buenos Aires	Group all-around
Gold medal – first place	2006 Buenos Aires	5 ribbons
Gold medal – first place	2006 Buenos Aires	3 hoops + 4 clubs

Nicole Toledo Romme Muller (born 27 February 1989) was a Brazilian group rhythmic gymnast. She represented her nation at international competitions.

She participated at the 2008 Summer Olympics in Beijing. She also competed at world championships, including at the 2005 World Rhythmic Gymnastics Championships, and 2007 World Rhythmic Gymnastics Championships.

== See also ==
- List of Olympic rhythmic gymnasts for Brazil
