= Justin Spring =

American artistic gymnast (born 1984)

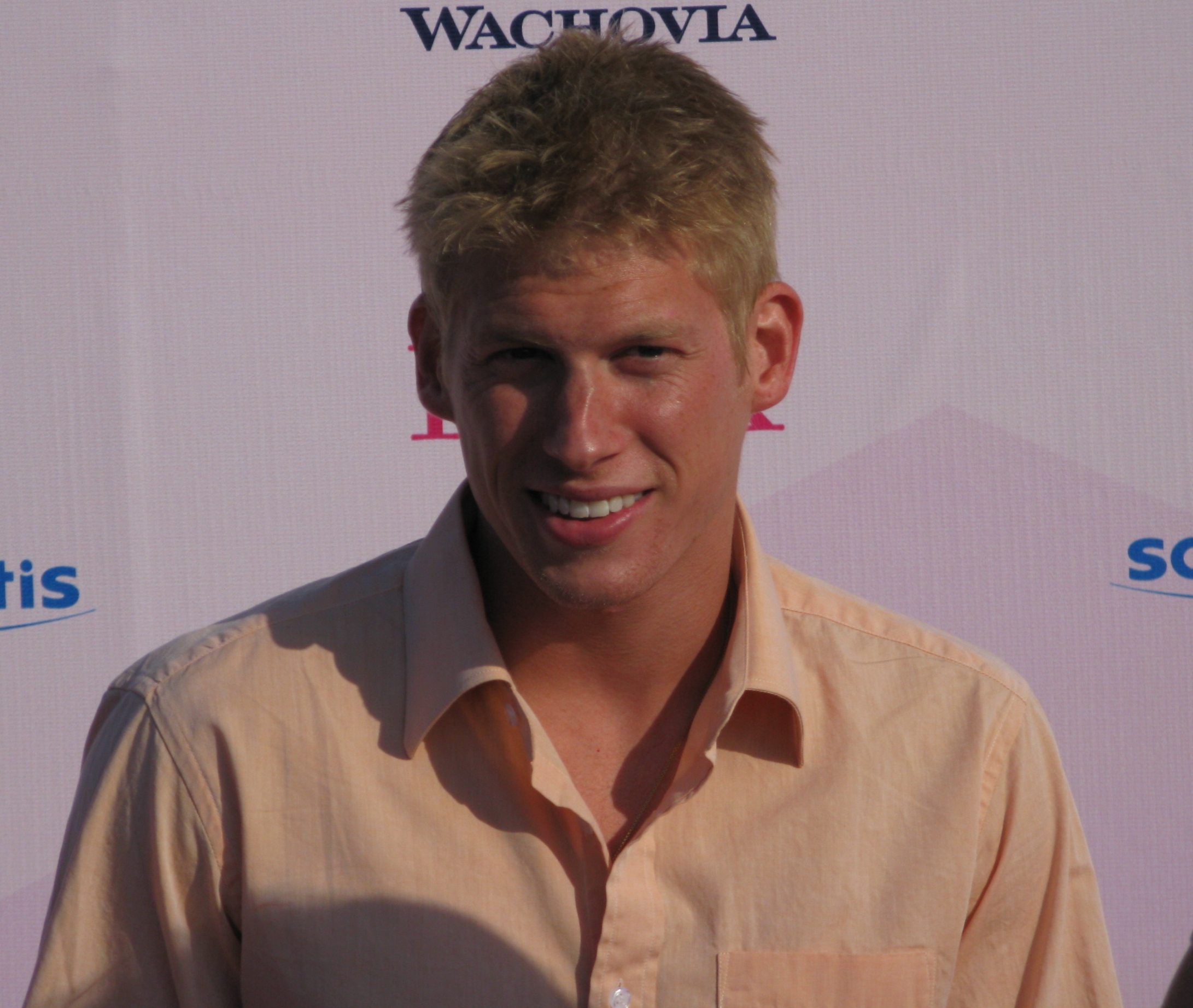
- Spring in 2008

Personal information
- Full name: Justin Edward Spring
- Born: March 11, 1984 (age 42) Houston, Texas, U.S.
- Height: 170 cm (5 ft 7 in)

Gymnastics career
- Discipline: Men's artistic gymnastics
- Country represented: United States; (2005–2009)
- College team: Illinois Fighting Illini
- Gym: Team Chevron; Capital Gymnastics
- Head coach: Yoshi Hayasaki
- Assistant coach: Jon Valdez
- Retired: 2009
Medal record
Men's artistic gymnastics
Representing United States
Event	1st	2nd	3rd
Olympic Games	0	0	1
Pan American Games	1	0	1
Total	1	0	2
Olympic Games
Bronze medal – third place	2008 Beijing	Team
Pan American Games
Gold medal – first place	2007 Rio de Janeiro	Parallel bars
Bronze medal – third place	2007 Rio de Janeiro	Team
- Awards: Nissen-Emery Award (2006)

Justin Spring
Current position
- Title: Associate head coach
- Team: Alabama Crimson Tide
- Conference: SEC

Biographical details
- Education: University of Illinois

Coaching career (HC unless noted)
- 2007–2010: Illinois (Asst.)
- 2011–2022: Illinois
- 2022–2023: Alabama (Asst.)
- 2024–present: Alabama (Associate HC)

Justin Edward Spring (born March 11, 1984) is a retired American gymnast and current gymnastics coach. He was a member of the United States men's national artistic gymnastics team and won an Olympic bronze medal at the 2008 Summer Olympics. He was also a top gymnast in NCAA competition, where he represented the University of Illinois.

== Early life and education ==
Spring was born in Houston, Texas, and raised in Burke, Virginia. His father, Sherwood C. Spring, was a United States Army colonel and former NASA astronaut. His sister, Sarah, was also a highly decorated collegiate gymnast at Ohio State University from 2000 to 2004.

Spring graduated from Lake Braddock Secondary School in 2002 and went on to attend the University of Illinois Urbana-Champaign.

== Gymnastics career ==
Overall, the Burke, Va., native is a four-time NCAA Champion, winning a pair of titles on the horizontal bar in 2004 and 2006 and back-to-back crowns on parallel bars in 2005 and 2006. Along with his national recognition, Spring earned 2006 Big Ten Gymnast of the Year accolades after winning the all-around crown at the Big Ten Championships. Spring finished his career being named to the All-Big Ten first team three times, grabbed Big Ten Gymnast of the Week laurels six times, and earned Inside Gymnastics' NCAA Gymnast of the Week honors three times.

During his four-year career, Spring garnered three Big Ten Championships with titles on parallel bars and all-around in 2006 and on the floor exercise in 2004. Spring is a two-time recipient of the Dike Eddleman Athlete of the Year award (2004, 2006), which goes to Illinois' top male and female athlete. A face and name that will forever be remembered in Illini record books, Spring left the Fighting Illini a 12-time All-American, the most since Abie Grossfeld earned 12 from 1957–59, and holds the Illinois record on the floor exercise, vault, parallel bars, and horizontal bar.

In 2006, Spring strung together one of the best seasons in Illinois gymnastics' history, earning the 2006 Nissen-Emery Award, an honor that goes to the top senior male gymnast in the nation. A double titlist at the 2006 NCAAs, Spring took home the crown in the horizontal bar and defended his title in parallel bars. In addition, he carded five total All-America honors with a second-place finish in all-around, third on floor exercise, and fourth on vault.

Along with his individual honors, Spring helped the Illini to runner-up finishes at the 2006 NCAA and Big Ten Championships. The finish at NCAAs came half a point shy of team-champion Oklahoma, and just short of the Orange and Blue's 10th national title.

Overall in his collegiate career, he is

- 2006 Nissen-Emery Award winner
- 2006 NCAA Parallel Bars Champion
- 2006 NCAA Horizontal Bar Co-Champion
- 2006 Big Ten Gymnast of the Year
- 2006 Big Ten Parallel Bars Champion
- 2006 Big Ten All-Around Champion
- 2005 U.S. National Horizontal Bar Champion
- 2005 NCAA Parallel Bars Champion
- 2004 NCAA Horizontal Bar Champion
- 2004 Big Ten Floor Exercise Champion
- 12-time All-American
- Three-time All-Big Ten Team Member
- Six-time Big Ten Gymnast of the Week
- Three-time Inside Gymnastics NCAA Gymnast of the Week
- Two-time UI Dike Eddleman Athlete of the Year (2004, 2006)
- Illinois School Record Holder (FX, VT, PB, HB)
- Two-Year Team Captain

=== International career ===
Spring has also competed internationally representing the United States.

He represented the U.S. at the 2005 World Artistic Gymnastics Championships in Melbourne, Australia on floor exercise, parallel bars, and horizontal bar as a member of the 2005 U.S. National Team. At the 2005 World Championships, Spring finished 10th to qualify as a reserve on horizontal bar and finished 12th on parallel bars. In 2005, Spring became the first Illini to ever win a U.S. National title with his two-day combined horizontal bar score of 18.750, while also scoring a 9.500 on the horizontal bar at the 2005 American Cup to take home the silver medal behind Olympic champion Paul Hamm.

The Illini gymnast finished fourth on the horizontal bar at the 2004 Visa U.S. Championships with scores of 9.600 and 9.650 in the two-day format, and competed for Team USA at the 2003 World University Games in Daegu, South Korea, advancing to the finals on floor. In 2006, Spring garnered a selection to the 2006 Men's World Championships team, but had to withdraw due to injury. Spring graduated from the University of Illinois in 2006 with a bachelor's degree in speech communication.

He is a three-time U.S. Senior National Team Member, a 2005 U.S. World Championships Team Member, the 2005 Visa U.S. Championships Horizontal Bar Champion, the 2005 Winter Cup Horizontal Bar Champion, the 2005 American Cup Horizontal Bar Silver Medalist, the 2003 World University Games Team Member

Spring tore his anterior cruciate ligament at the 2007 Visa Championships.

Spring was named to the U.S. Olympic Gymnastics team on June 22, 2008. He performed very well at the Olympics, and was a key part of the United States Team's bronze medal victory, posting high scores on the vault, parallel bars, horizontal bar, and the floor exercise. His high-flying horizontal bar routine in team finals was particularly impressive and included a stuck triple-back dismount and scored 15.675.

Spring's resemblance to Prince Harry has earned him the nickname Prince.

=== Retirement ===
In 2010 Spring was named Head Coach of the Illinois Fighting Illini men's gymnastics. He indicated that the new position required him to retire from the sport.

== Coaching career ==
Spring began his coaching career in 2010 with the University of Illinois men's gymnastics program. Spring, one of the Illinois's most talented gymnasts, finished his competitive career in 2006, and since then he has led the Orange and Blue to Big Ten and NCAA Championship titles in his role as head coach.

Following the 2009–10 season, Spring was named head coach for the Illinois men's gymnastics program after spending one year as an associate head coach. Spring handles all of the gym coaching duties along with assistant coaches Ivan Ivankov and 2010 graduate Luke Stannard.

In one season as associate head coach, Spring led Illinois to its second-straight Big Ten team title and a fourth-place finish at the NCAA Championships. Individually, five Illini earned All-America accolades, three took home Big Ten titles and Stannard became just the third Illini to win the prestigious Nissen-Emery Award, which is presented annually to the nation's top senior male gymnast.

Additionally, Spring helped guide Illinois to a 22–5 overall record and the top spot in the rankings on four separate occasions and never dropped out of the top five. For his efforts, Spring was honored as both Central Region Coach of the Year and Big Ten Coach of the Year.

Spring was promoted to associate head coach following the 2009 season after three years as an assistant under the legendary Yoshi Hayasaki. The promotion meant that Spring had to retire from competitive gymnastics to concentrate on coaching full-time.

In 2009, Spring was named Central Region Assistant Coach of the Year along with Ivankov after helping Illinois to the Big Ten Championship, a fifth-place finish at the NCAA Championships, and three individual NCAA titles.

In 2012, Spring helped the University of Illinois Fighting Illini win the NCAA national championship in Gymnastics. https://web.archive.org/web/20120430011148/http://www.fightingillini.com/sports/m-gym/recaps/042012aaj.html

== Personal life ==
On May 29, 2010, Spring married fellow Illinois alumna Tori Tanney. Justin and Tori welcomed their first child, Cody, in July 2012.

Spring has been a spokesperson for the skincare line Proactiv.

== Head coaching record ==
Record table
Season	Team	Overall	Conference	Standing	Postseason
Illinois (Big Ten Conference) (2010–present)
2010	Illinois	22–5		1st	NCAA Fourth Place
2011	Illinois	25–8		1st	NCAA Third Place
2012	Illinois	28–2		1st	NCAA Champions
2013	Illinois	12–18–1	5–5–1	5th	
2014	Illinois	19-12-1		4th	NCAA Fourth Place
2015	Illinois	18-7		2nd	
2016	Illinois	23-10		2nd	NCAA Fourth Place
2017	Illinois			2nd	NCAA Third Place
2018	Illinois			1st	NCAA Third Place
Illinois:		87–23–1	29–11–1		
Total:		87–23–1			
National champion Postseason invitational champion Conference regular season champion Conference regular season and conference tournament champion Division regular season champion Division regular season and conference tournament champion Conference tournament champion
