= Guillermo Alvarez (gymnast) =

American artistic gymnast

- Full name: Guillermo Carlos Alvarez
- Born: October 24, 1982 (age 43) Colorado, U.S.
- Relatives: Bryan Alvarez (cousin)

Gymnastics career
- Discipline: Men's artistic gymnastics
- Country represented: United States (2005–2009)
- College team: Minnesota Golden Gophers (2002–2005)
- Gym: Gymnastika, Inc.
- Head coach: Mike Burns
- Former coaches: Fred Roethlisberger; Alexei Koudria
- Eponymous skills: Alvarez (horizontal bar)
- Retired: 2009
- Awards: Nissen-Emery Award (2005); Big Ten Medal of Honor (2005)
Medal record
Men's artistic gymnastics
Representing United States
Event	1st	2nd	3rd
Pan American Games	0	1	2
Pan American Championships	1	1	0
Total	1	2	2
Pan American Games
Silver medal – second place	2007 Rio de Janeiro	Floor
Bronze medal – third place	2007 Rio de Janeiro	Team
Bronze medal – third place	2007 Rio de Janeiro	All-around
Pan American Championships
Gold medal – first place	2005 Rio de Janeiro	Team
Silver medal – second place	2005 Rio de Janeiro	Floor

Guillermo Carlos Alvarez (born October 24, 1982) is an American artistic gymnastics coach and former gymnast. He was a member of the United States men's national artistic gymnastics team and won three medals while representing the United States at the 2007 Pan American Games.

== Early life and education ==
Alvarez was born October 24, 1982, in Colorado. His father emigrated from Rioverde, San Luis Potosí to Idaho and the family worked in potato fields. A native of Denver, Alvarez started gymnastics at 10 years old. He trained at Gymnastika, Inc. under coach Alexei Koudria in Wheatridge, Colorado. He attended Green Mountain High School in Lakewood, Colorado. He enrolled at the University of Minnesota to pursue gymnastics.

== Gymnastics career ==
In college, Alvarez competed for the Minnesota Golden Gophers men's gymnastics team from 2002 to 2005 and was the 2005 Nissen Award winner (the "Heisman" of men's gymnastics).

Domestically, he was the floor apparatus national champion at the 2005 U.S. National Gymnastics Championships.

Alvarez was a member of the 2005 Pan American Gymnastics Championships team and won a team all-around gold medal and silver medal on the floor. The following year, he won two individual medals and one team medal at the 2007 Pan American Games. He was a member of the 2006 and 2007 World Championship teams. In 2008, he just missed the Olympics, finishing 6th in the all-around and 3rd on pommel horse, but was not selected.

Alvarez retired from competition in 2009 at the age of 26.

== Coaching career ==
Following his retirement, Alvarez began coaching. He began coaching in 2009 at TAGS Gymnastics in Eden Prairie, Minnesota, alongside a fellow Minnesota Golden Gophers gymnast. He later became a coach with the Icelandic National Team.

== Personal life ==
Alvarez is the cousin of Bryan Alvarez.

== Eponymous skills ==
Alvarez has one named element on the horizontal bar.

Gymnastics elements named after Guillermo Alvarez
Apparatus	Name	Description	Difficulty (Note: Valid for the 2025–2028 Code of Points)	Added to Code of Points
Horizontal bar	Alvarez	"Double salto fwd. str. with 1/1 or 3/2 t."	E, 0.5	Performed at the 2007 World Artistic Gymnastics Championships, but added to CoP in 2021.
