= Emma Willis (gymnast) =

Canadian artistic gymnast

- Born: 27 August 1992 (age 34)

Gymnastics career
- Discipline: Women's artistic gymnastics
- Country represented: Canada (2010)

Emma Willis (born 27 August 1992) is a Canadian female artistic gymnast and part of the national team. She participated at the 2010 World Artistic Gymnastics Championships in Rotterdam, the Netherlands.
