= Cynthia Valdez =

Mexican rhythmic gymnast

- Full name: Cynthia Yazmín Valdez Pérez
- Born: December 11, 1987 (age 38) Guadalajara
- Height: 1.71 m (5 ft 7 in)

Gymnastics career
- Discipline: Rhythmic gymnastics
- Country represented: Mexico
- Former countries represented: Mexico
- Club: CODE JALISCO
Medal record
Pan American Games
| Gold medal – first place | 2011 Guadalajara | Clubs |
| Gold medal – first place | 2011 Guadalajara | Hoop |
| Silver medal – second place | 2007 Rio de Janeiro | All-Around |
| Silver medal – second place | 2011 Guadalajara | All-Around |
| Silver medal – second place | 2011 Guadalajara | Ball |
| Silver medal – second place | 2011 Guadalajara | Ribbon |
| Bronze medal – third place | 2003 Santo Domingo | Ribbon |
| Bronze medal – third place | 2007 Rio de Janeiro | Clubs |
| Bronze medal – third place | 2007 Rio de Janeiro | Rope |
| Bronze medal – third place | 2007 Rio de Janeiro | Ribbon |
Pan American Championships
| Gold medal – first place | 2005 Vitória | Rope |
| Gold medal – first place | 2005 Vitória | Ball |
| Gold medal – first place | 2005 Vitória | Clubs |
| Silver medal – second place | 2005 Vitória | All-around |
| Silver medal – second place | 2005 Vitória | Ribbon |
| Silver medal – second place | 2010 Guadalajara | All-around |
| Silver medal – second place | 2014 Mississauga | Ribbon |
| Bronze medal – third place | 2005 Vitória | Team |
| Bronze medal – third place | 2010 Guadalajara | Rope |
| Bronze medal – third place | 2010 Guadalajara | Ball |
| Bronze medal – third place | 2014 Mississauga | Team |
Central American and Caribbean Games
| Gold medal – first place | 2006 Cartagena | All-Around |
| Gold medal – first place | 2006 Cartagena | Team |
| Gold medal – first place | 2006 Cartagena | Rope |
| Gold medal – first place | 2006 Cartagena | Clubs |
| Gold medal – first place | 2006 Cartagena | Ball |
| Gold medal – first place | 2006 Cartagena | Ribbon |
| Gold medal – first place | 2014 Veracruz | All-Around |
| Gold medal – first place | 2014 Veracruz | Clubs |
| Gold medal – first place | 2014 Veracruz | Ribbon |
| Silver medal – second place | 2014 Veracruz | Ball |

Cynthia Yazmín Valdez Pérez (born December 11, 1987) is an individual Mexican rhythmic gymnast born in Guadalajara who has won 10 Pan American Games medals—two gold, four silver and four bronze medals.

== Career ==
She won a bronze medal in the 2003 Pan American Games, held in Santo Domingo, Dominican Republic, in the ribbon modality.

Cynthia Valdez won four medals in the 2007 Pan American Games held in Rio de Janeiro, Brazil, a silver medal in the all-around modality, and three bronze medals, in the clubs, rope and ribbon modalities.

She won five medals in the 2011 Pan American Games held in Guadalajara, Mexico, which were two gold medals and three silver medals. Cynthia Valdez won the gold medals in the hoop and in the club modalities, while she won the silver medals in the all-around, in the ball, and in the ribbon modalities. Cynthia Valdez was the only rhythmic gymnast to win a medal in each one of the individual competitions in the 2011 Pan American Games.
