= Trampoline at the 2010 Central American and Caribbean Games =

Trampoline gymnastics at the Mayagüez 2010 Central American and Caribbean Games
- Venue: Coliseo Mayor "El Salitre"
- Location: Bogotá, Colombia
- Dates: 22–23 July 2010

The trampoline gymnastics competition of the Mayagüez 2010 Central American and Caribbean Games was held 22–23 July 2010 at Coliseo Mayor "El Salitre" in Bogotá, Colombia.

== Medal summary ==
=== Men's events ===
Event	Gold		Silver		Bronze	
Individual	Jorge García; Mexico	36.30	Natanael Cámara; Puerto Rico	35.50	Santiago Marcano; Venezuela	28.60

=== Women's events ===
Event	Gold		Silver		Bronze	
Individual	María Reynaud; Mexico	32.30	Niny Bulla; Colombia	26.60	Massiel Lebrón; Dominican Republic	23.60

== See also ==
- Artistic gymnastics at the 2010 Central American and Caribbean Games
- Rhythmic gymnastics at the 2010 Central American and Caribbean Games
