= Angélica Kvieczynski =

Brazilian rhythmic gymnast

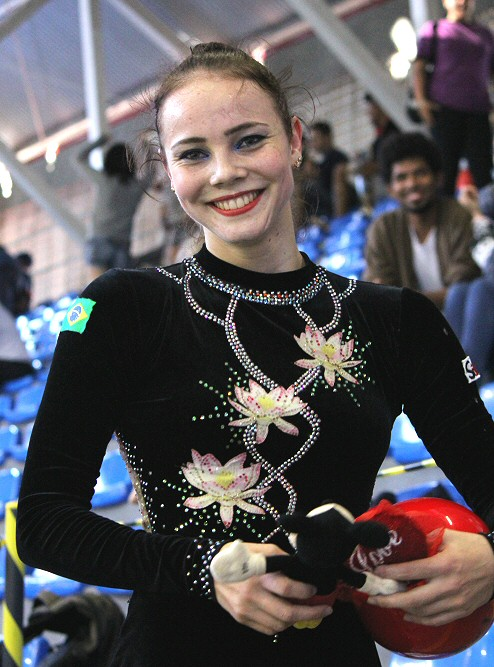

Personal information
- Full name: Angélica Cristine Kvieczynski
- Born: September 1, 1991 (age 35) Toledo
- Height: 1.62 m (5 ft 4 in)

Gymnastics career
- Discipline: Rhythmic gymnastics
- Country represented: Brazil
- Club: Grêmio Recreativo Sadia/Toledo City Hall/SESI
- Head coach: Anita Klemann
- Retired: 2018
Medal record
Rhythmic gymnastics
Representing Brazil
Pan American Games
Silver medal – second place	2011 Guadalajara	Clubs
Bronze medal – third place	2011 Guadalajara	All-Around
Bronze medal – third place	2011 Guadalajara	Ball
Bronze medal – third place	2011 Guadalajara	Hoop
Bronze medal – third place	2015 Toronto	Hoop
Bronze medal – third place	2015 Toronto	Ribbon
Pan American Championships
Silver medal – second place	2014 Mississauga	Team
Silver medal – second place	2014 Mississauga	Hoop
Bronze medal – third place	2014 Mississauga	All-Around
Bronze medal – third place	2014 Mississauga	Clubs
Bronze medal – third place	2014 Mississauga	Ribbon
Pan American Sports Festival
Gold medal – first place	2014 Guadalajara	All-Around
South American Games
Gold medal – first place	2010 Medellín	All-Around
Gold medal – first place	2010 Medellín	Team
Gold medal – first place	2010 Medellín	Hoop
Gold medal – first place	2010 Medellín	Rope
Gold medal – first place	2010 Medellín	Clubs
Gold medal – first place	2010 Medellín	Ribbon
Gold medal – first place	2014 Santiago	All-Around
Gold medal – first place	2014 Santiago	Hoop
Gold medal – first place	2014 Santiago	Ribbon
Silver medal – second place	2014 Santiago	Ball
South American Championships
Gold medal – first place	2013 Santiago	Team
Gold medal – first place	2013 Santiago	Ball
Gold medal – first place	2013 Santiago	Clubs
Gold medal – first place	2013 Santiago	Ribbon
Silver medal – second place	2013 Santiago	All-Around

Angélica Cristine Kvieczynski, better known as Angélica Kvieczynski (born September 1, 1991), is an individual Brazilian rhythmic gymnast. She competed in the 2007 Pan American Games, won a silver medal and three bronze medals in the 2011 Pan American Games, won six gold medals in the 2010 South American Games and won the Prêmio Brasil Olímpico once. Now she is a coach for junior gymnasts.

== Personal life ==
Angélica Kvieczynski was born in Toledo, and she is of Polish, Russian, German and Italian descent. She began rhythmic gymnastics when she was 9; she became interested after seeing other girls training.

In 2019, she spoke about experiencing intense weight control from coaches after joining the national team, which lead to an eating disorder and health issues from dehydration, as well as undergoing forced stretching and witnessing racism. Her experience lead to her becoming suicidal. She stated that although she felt her body could have handled training for another Olympic cycle, she preferred to become a coach with a healthier training environment.

She married badminton player Daniel Paiola in 2020.

== Career ==
Kvieczynski joined the senior national team in 2007. She participated in the 2007 Pan American Games, held in Rio de Janeiro, Brazil, with her best placement there being fifth place in the hoop final.

At the 2010 South American Games, held in Medellín, Colombia, she won a gold medal in the rhythmic team competition as well as in the individual all-around and the hoop, rope, clubs and ribbon finals. She won the Prêmio Brasil Olímpico for best rhythmic gymnast in 2010.

Kvieczynski went to the 2011 Pan American Games, held in Guadalajara, where she won a silver medal and three bronze medals. Her first bronze medal was won on October 15, 2011 in the all-around competition. She won three more medals on October 17, 2011, one bronze in the ball final and another in the hoop final, as well as a silver medal in the club final. At the 2014 World Championships, she only competed with the hoop and ball due to an administrative error preventing her from registering for all events. She placed 35th with the hoop and 38th with the ball, the best placements of the Brazilian gymnasts at the event.

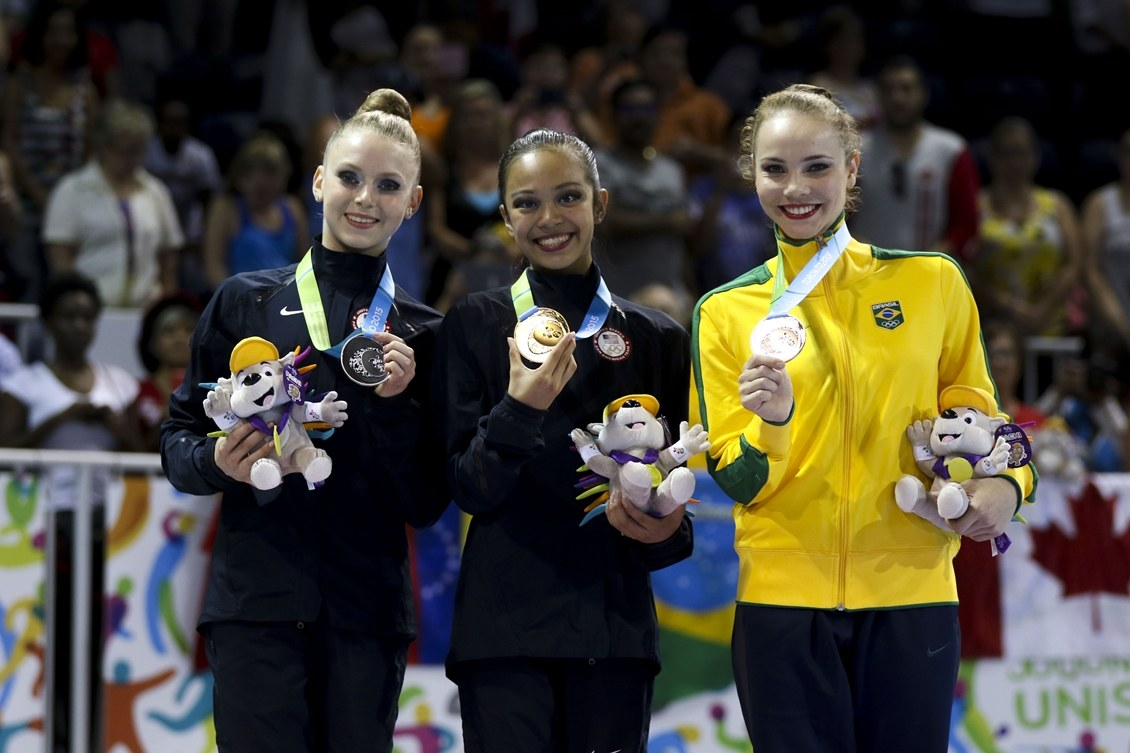
Kvieczynski (right) with Laura Zeng (center) and Jasmine Kerber (left) with their hoop medals at the 2015 Pan American Games.

In 2015, she competed at her third Pan American Games, where she lost the bronze medal in the all-around after appealing a score; the judges lowered her final score, which dropped her into fourth place. However, in the apparatus finals, she won bronze medals in hoop and ribbon, both behind Laura Zeng and Jasmine Kerber. On September 9–13, Kvieczynski competed at the 2015 World Championships in Stuttgart, where she finished 54th in the all-around qualifications and did not advance into the finals. She did not compete at the 2016 Summer Olympics, where Brazil had one host spot, as Natália Gaudio finished slightly ahead of her at the World Championships and was selected as Brazil's representative.
