= Larissa Evangelista =

Brazilian rhythmic gymnast

- Born: 25 January 1988 (age 38) Brasília, DF

Gymnastics career
- Discipline: Rhythmic gymnastics
- Country represented: Brazil (2005)
Medal record
Pan American Championships
Gold medal – first place	2005 Vitória	Groups all-around
Gold medal – first place	2005 Vitória	5 ribbons
Gold medal – first place	2005 Vitória	3 hoops + 4 clubs

Larissa Evangelista (born 25 January 1988) is a Brazilian group rhythmic gymnast. She represented Brazil in international competitions. She competed at world championships, including at the 2005 World Rhythmic Gymnastics Championships in Baku, Azerbaijan.
