= Luis Rivera (gymnast) =

Puerto Rican artistic gymnast (born 1986)

- Full name: Luis Ramon Rivera Rivera
- Born: September 4, 1986 (age 40) Humacao, Puerto Rico
- Height: 1.68 m (5 ft 6 in)

Gymnastics career
- Discipline: Men's artistic gymnastics
- Country represented: Puerto Rico
- Club: Federacion Puertorriqueña de Gimnasia
- Head coach: Jose R. Colon
- Assistant coach: Juan C. Colon
Medal record
Representing Puerto Rico
Pan American Games
Gold medal – first place	2007 Rio de Janeiro	Team
Gold medal – first place	2007 Rio de Janeiro	Pommel horse
Bronze medal – third place	2007 Rio de Janeiro	Vault
Silver medal – second place	2011 Guadalajara	Team

Luis Ramon Rivera Rivera (born September 4, 1986 in Humacao) is a Puerto Rican gymnast. Rivera had won a total of three medals at the 2007 Pan American Games in Rio de Janeiro, Brazil, including two golds for the team all-around and pommel horse. He competed at the 2008 Summer Olympics in Beijing, where he finished fourteenth in the men's individual all-around final, with a total technical score of 90.175. He is also affiliated with Federacion Puertorriqueña de Gimnasia (Puerto Rican Federation of Gymnastics), and is coached and trained by Jose and Juan R. Colon.

== Career achievements ==
- Fourteenth place in the individual all-around event at the 2008 Summer Olympics in Beijing, China
- Three-time medalist (two golds and one bronze) at the 2007 Pan American Games in Rio de Janeiro, Brazil
- Finished fourth for vault at the 2008 Turnier der Meister in Cottbus, Germany, and at the 2011 ART World Cup Series in Paris, France
- Bronze medalist in men's vault at the 2008 Doha Artistic Gymnastics World Cup
