= Gymnastics at the 2007 Pan American Games =

- Gymnastics pictograms
- Venues: Arena Multi-uso, Riocentro Pavilion 3A
- Start date: July 14, 2007
- End date: July 28, 2007
- No. of events: 24 (9 men, 15 women)
- Competitors: 173 from 17 nations

Gymnastics at the 2007 Pan American Games consisted of three separate sets of events – artistic gymnastics, rhythmic gymnastics, and trampoline gymnastics.

== Medal summary ==
=== Medal table ===
* Host nation (Brazil)

Rank	Nation	Gold	Silver	Bronze	Total
1	United States	9	10	4	23
2	Brazil*	7	2	7	16
3	Canada	4	2	3	9
4	Venezuela	3	0	1	4
5	Puerto Rico	2	0	3	5
6	Colombia	0	3	0	3
6	Cuba	0	3	0	3
8	Mexico	0	2	5	7
9	Chile	0	1	1	2
Totals (9 entries)		25	23	24	72

=== Artistic gymnastics ===
==== Men ====
Games	Gold	Silver	Bronze
Team all-around	Puerto Rico; Rafael Morales; Reinaldo Oquendo; Tommy Ramos; Luis Rivera; Alexander Rodríguez; Luis Vargas	Brazil; Luis Anjos; Diego Hypólito; Danilo Nogueira; Mosiah Rodrigues; Victor Rosa; Adan Santos	United States; Guillermo Alvarez; David Durante; Sean Golden; Joseph Hagerty; Justin Spring; Todd Thornton
Individual all-around	José Luis Fuentes; Venezuela	Jorge Hugo Giraldo; Colombia	Guillermo Alvarez; United States
Floor exercise	Diego Hypólito; Brazil	Guillermo Alvarez; United States	Tomás González; Chile
Pommel horse	Luis Rivera; Puerto Rico José Luis Fuentes; Venezuela	—N/a	Alexander Rodríguez; Puerto Rico
Rings	Regulo Carmona; Venezuela	Sean Golden; United States	Carlos Carbonell; Venezuela
Vault	Diego Hypólito; Brazil	Tomás González; Chile	Luis Rivera; Puerto Rico
Parallel bars	Justin Spring; United States	Jorge Hugo Giraldo; Colombia	Luis Vargas; Puerto Rico
Horizontal bar	Mosiah Rodrigues; Brazil	Jorge Hugo Giraldo; Colombia	Danilo Nogueira; Brazil

==== Women ====
Event	Gold	Silver	Bronze
Team all-around	United States; Rebecca Bross; Ivana Hong; Shawn Johnson; Nastia Liukin; Samantha Peszek; Amber Trani	Brazil; Jade Barbosa; Khiuani Dias; Daniele Hypólito; Ana Silva; Daiane dos Santos; Laís Souza	Canada; Stéphanie Desjardins-Labelle; Christine Peng-Peng Lee; Ti Liu; Charlotte Mackie; Brittany Rogers; Emma Willis
Individual all-around	Shawn Johnson; United States	Rebecca Bross; United States	Ivana Hong; United States
Vault	Jade Barbosa; Brazil	Amber Trani; United States	Laís Souza; Brazil
Uneven bars	Shawn Johnson; United States	Nastia Liukin; United States	Laís Souza; Brazil
Balance beam	Shawn Johnson; United States	Nastia Liukin; United States	Daniele Hypólito; Brazil
Floor exercise	Rebecca Bross; United States	Shawn Johnson; United States	Jade Barbosa; Brazil

=== Rhythmic gymnastics ===
==== Individual ====
Event	Gold	Silver	Bronze
Individual all-around	Lisa Wang; United States	Cynthia Valdéz; Mexico	Rut Castillo; Mexico
Rope	Alexandra Orlando; Canada	Lisa Wang; United States	Cynthia Valdéz; Mexico
Hoop	Alexandra Orlando; Canada	Rut Castillo; Mexico	Ana Paula Scheffer; Brazil
Clubs	Alexandra Orlando; Canada	Lisa Wang; United States	Rut Castillo; Mexico
Ribbon	Lisa Wang; United States	Julie Zetlin; United States	Cynthia Valdéz; Mexico

==== Group ====
Event	Gold	Silver	Bronze
Group all-around	Brazil; Daniela Leite; Tayanne Mantovaneli; Luisa Matsuo; Marcela Menezes; Nicole Muller; Natália Sanchez	Cuba; Yanet Comas; Maydelis Delgado; Rachel Kindelan; Elsy Ortíz; Yeney Renovales; Mirlay Sánchez	Canada; Kathryn de Cata; Alissa Hansen; Monika Lechowicz; Suzanne Lendvay; Brihana Mosienko; Roxanne Porter
5 ropes	Brazil; Daniela Leite; Tayanne Mantovaneli; Luisa Matsuo; Marcela Menezes; Nicole Muller; Natália Sanchez	Cuba; Yanet Comas; Maydelis Delgado; Rachel Kindelan; Elsy Ortíz; Yeney Renovales; Mirlay Sánchez	Canada; Kathryn de Cata; Alissa Hansen; Monika Lechowicz; Suzanne Lendvay; Brihana Mosienko; Roxanne Porter
3 hoops + 4 clubs	Brazil; Daniela Leite; Tayanne Mantovaneli; Luisa Matsuo; Marcela Menezes; Nicole Muller; Natália Sanchez	Cuba; Yanet Comas; Maydelis Delgado; Rachel Kindelan; Elsy Ortíz; Yeney Renovales; Mirlay Sánchez	Mexico; Blajaith Aguilar Rojas; Sofia Díaz de León; Marlenne Martínez Medina; Ana Cristina Ortega; Citlaly Quinta Álvarez; Sara Reyes Rodríguez

=== Trampoline ===
Event	Gold	Silver	Bronze
Men	(United States) Chris Estrada	(Canada) Jason Burnett	(United States) Ryan Weston
Women	(Canada) Karen Cockburn	(Canada) Rosannagh MacLennan	(Brazil) Giovanna Matheus

== Men's artistic gymnastics ==
=== Team competition ===
Rank	Team	Floor (gymnastics)	Pommel horse	Rings (gymnastics)	Vault (gymnastics)	Parallel bars	Horizontal bar	Total
1st place, gold medalist(s)	Puerto Rico	58.100 (3)	59.250 (1)	59.200 (3)	62.950 (3)	57.250 (5)	57.150 (1)	353.900
1st place, gold medalist(s)	Rafael Morales	14.350	14.650		15.700		0.000	353.900
1st place, gold medalist(s)	Reinaldo Oquendo	13.850	13.900	14.300		13.550		353.900
1st place, gold medalist(s)	Tommy Ramos Nin			15.150		14.550	14.400	353.900
1st place, gold medalist(s)	Luis Rivera	14.600	15.100	15.100	15.750	14.300	13.800	353.900
1st place, gold medalist(s)	Alexander Rodríguez Colon	14.800	14.800	12.800	15.800	13.750	15.200	353.900
1st place, gold medalist(s)	Luis Vargas	14.350	14.700	14.650	15.700	14.650	14.150	353.900
2nd place, silver medalist(s)	Brazil	60.450 (1)	55.850 (2)	58.450 (4)	63.150 (2)	58.650 (2)	57.050 (2)	353.600
2nd place, silver medalist(s)	Luis Anjos	14.600	13.600	14.850	15.050	15.050	14.300	353.600
2nd place, silver medalist(s)	Diego Hypólito	15.900	13.600		16.100			353.600
2nd place, silver medalist(s)	Danila Nogueira		14.100	15.000		14.350	14.450	353.600
2nd place, silver medalist(s)	Mosiah Rodrigues	15.100	14.250	12.650	15.600	14.600	14.400	353.600
2nd place, silver medalist(s)	Victor Rosa	14.850	13.900	14.000	15.650	14.650	13.900	353.600
2nd place, silver medalist(s)	Adan Santos	14.100		14.600	15.800	14.350	11.500	353.600
3rd place, bronze medalist(s)	United States	58.900 (2)	54.400 (5)	59.300 (2)	64.050 (1)	59.700 (1)	56.950 (3)	353.300
3rd place, bronze medalist(s)	Guillermo Alvarez	15.050	13.150	14.750	15.800	14.800	13.400	353.300
3rd place, bronze medalist(s)	David Durante	14.100	13.500	14.900	15.400	14.750	14.000	353.300
3rd place, bronze medalist(s)	Sean Golden	14.250		15.450	16.350			353.300
3rd place, bronze medalist(s)	Joey Hagerty	14.450	13.950			14.600	13.900	353.300
3rd place, bronze medalist(s)	Justin Spring	15.150			16.400	15.550	14.650	353.300
3rd place, bronze medalist(s)	Todd Thornton		13.800	14.200	15.500	14.300	14.400	353.300
4	Venezuela	57.650 (4)	54.450 (4)	60.650 (1)	61.950 (5)	57.700 (4)	55.150 (6)	347.550
4	Ivan Tovar		13.050			14.600	13.600	347.550
4	Carlos Carbonell	14.450	13.050	15.000	15.700	14.100	13.050	347.550
4	Regulo Carmona			16.200	14.950			347.550
4	Fernando Fuentes	14.350	13.850	14.200	15.850	14.150	13.400	347.550
4	José Luis Fuentes	14.800	14.500	15.250	15.450	14.850	14.300	347.550
4	Adickxon Trejo	14.050	12.100		14.600	13.900	13.850	347.550
5	Cuba	56.600 (5)	33.150 (6)	56.100 (5)	62.400 (4)	57.200 (6)	55.250 (5)	340.700
5	Irving Arroyo	14.300	13.100	13.550	15.550	14.300	14.350	340.700
5	Carlos Manuel Campaña	13.050	12.050		15.600	14.750	14.100	340.700
5	Gerardo Medina	15.000	14.350	15.000	15.700	14.750	13.800	340.700
5	Adriel Quintana			13.150	15.100			340.700
5	Fidel Silot	13.800	12.100	13.850		12.450	12.900	340.700
5	Reynier Villardis	13.500	13.600	13.700	15.550	13.400	13.000	340.700
6	Colombia	54.900 (7)	55.600 (3)	55.050 (6)	60.500 (7)	57.950 (3)	54.900 (7)	338.900
6	James Brochero	14.200	13.300	12.550	15.600	13.650	12.300	338.900
6	Deyvi Castellanos	13.200	12.150	13.550	14.850	14.250	13.300	338.900
6	Jorge Hugo Giraldo	14.500	14.900	14.900	15.300	15.100	14.400	338.900
6	Didier Lugo	12.500	13.900	14.050	14.750	14.150	13.200	338.900
6	Fabian Mesa	13.000	13.800	11.900	14.550	14.450	14.000	338.900
7	Canada	55.700 (6)	49.300 (7)	55.050 (6)	61.000 (6)	56.200 (7)	56.100 (4)	333.350
7	Jayd Lukenchuk	14.050	11.800		15.250	13.900	13.400	333.350
7	Pat McElroy	14.150	12.800	13.600	15.200		14.100	333.350
7	AJ Rayment	13.300	11.400	13.300	14.700	13.700		333.350
7	Hugh Smith	14.100	11.300	13.100	15.650	13.600	13.750	333.350
7	Jared Walls		13.300	14.100		14.300	14.550	333.350
7	Peter Andersen	13.400		14.050	14.900	14.300	13.700	333.350

=== All-around ===
Rank	Gymnast	Floor (gymnastics)	Pommel horse	Rings (gymnastics)	Vault (gymnastics)	Parallel bars	Horizontal bar	Total
1st place, gold medalist(s)	(Venezuela) José Luis Fuentes	14.550	15.150	15.350	15.450	15.150	14.800	90.450
2nd place, silver medalist(s)	(Colombia) Jorge Hugo Giraldo	14.900	14.700	15.000	15.600	14.500	14.750	89.450
3rd place, bronze medalist(s)	(United States) Guillermo Alvarez	15.300	14.350	14.550	15.500	14.450	13.750	87.900
4	(Puerto Rico) Luis Vargas	14.750	13.800	14.900	15.650	14.300	14.400	87.800
5	(United States) David Durante	14.600	13.650	14.850	15.600	14.900	14.150	87.750
6	(Cuba) Gerardo Medina	13.900	14.900	14.550	15.250	14.550	14.200	87.350
7	(Puerto Rico) Luis Rivera	14.400	14.700	13.450	15.700	14.100	14.200	86.550
8	(Brazil) Luis Anjos	13.450	13.850	14.850	15.200	14.800	14.200	86.350
9	(Brazil) Mosiah Rodrigues	14.800	13.600	13.050	15.500	14.600	14.500	86.050
10	(Argentina) Frederico Molinari	14.150	13.600	14.300	15.350	14.400	13.750	85.550
11	(Mexico) Daniel Corral Barrón	13.500	13.400	14.250	15.700	14.550	13.850	85.250
12	(Mexico) Luis Sosa Abarca	14.450	13.050	13.700	15.050	14.350	14.600	85.200
13	(Puerto Rico) Alexander Rodríguez Colon	15.050	13.700	11.850	15.250	14.000	15.150	85.000
14	(Venezuela) Fernando Fuentes	14.250	13.050	13.650	15.500	14.400	13.700	84.550
15	(Canada) Hugh Smith	14.900	12.800	13.250	15.400	13.700	13.450	83.500
16	(Venezuela) Carlos Carbonell	13.400	12.700	15.350	15.400	14.150	12.150	83.150
17	(Cuba) Reynier Villardis	14.300	12.700	14.100	13.900	14.450	12.900	82.400
18	(Cuba) Irving Arroyo	13.850	12.500	13.250	15.300	12.900	13.900	81.700
19	(Colombia) Fabian Mesa	13.200	13.250	12.150	14.550	14.200	14.300	81.650
20	(Colombia) Didier Lugo	13.000	12.900	13.650	14.050	14.750	13.100	81.450
21	(Argentina) Lucas Martinez Chiarlo	13.050	12.300	13.150	14.850	13.850	13.850	81.050
22	(Argentina) Osvaldo Martínez Brazun	13.650	11.250	13.950	14.600	13.400	13.050	79.900
23	(Guatemala) Mynor Antonio Juarez	12.550	12.250	12.600	15.450	13.250	12.200	78.300
24	(Guatemala) Mynor Joel Oliva	13.750	13.200	12.800	14.700	13.450	9.800	77.700

=== Floor exercise ===
Rank	Name	A Score	B Score	Penalty	Total
1st place, gold medalist(s)	(Brazil) Diego Hypólito	6.4	9.475		15.875
2nd place, silver medalist(s)	(United States) Guillermo Alvarez	6.5	9.125		15.625
3rd place, bronze medalist(s)	(Chile) Tomás González	6.2	9.350		15.550
4	(Puerto Rico) Alexander Rodriguez Colon	5.7	9.475		15.175
5	(Brazil) Mosiah Rodrigues	5.9	9.100		15.000
6	(Puerto Rico) Luis Rivera	5.9	9.075		14.975
7	(United States) Justin Spring	5.9	8.800		14.700
8	(Cuba) Gerardo Medina	6.1	8.225	-0.1	14.225

=== Pommel horse ===
Rank	Name	A Score	B Score	Penalty	Total
1st place, gold medalist(s)	(Puerto Rico) Luis Rivera	6.0	9.175		15.175
1st place, gold medalist(s)	(Venezuela) Jose Luis Fuentes	6.1	9.075		15.175
3rd place, bronze medalist(s)	(Puerto Rico) Alexander Rodríguez Colon	6.0	9.025		15.025
4	(Venezuela) Jorge Hugo Giraldo	5.8	9.200		15.000
5	(Mexico) Daniel Corral Barrón	5.5	9.125		14.625
6	(Brazil) Mosiah Rodrigues	6.1	8.425		14.525
7	(Brazil) Danilo Nogueira	5.5	8.750		14.250
8	(Cuba) Gerardo Medina	5.9	8.200		14.100

=== Rings ===
Rank	Name	A Score	B Score	Penalty	Total
1st place, gold medalist(s)	(Venezuela) Regulo Carmona	7.0	8.675		15.675
2nd place, silver medalist(s)	(United States) Sean Golden	6.4	8.875		15.275
3rd place, bronze medalist(s)	(Venezuela) Carlos Carbonell	6.3	8.850		15.150
4	(Puerto Rico) Tommy Ramos Nin	6.2	8.900		15.100
5	(United States) David Durante	6.2	8.700		14.900
6	(Cuba) Gerardo Medina	6.1	8.875		14.875
7	(Brazil) Danilo Nogueira	6.3	8.275		14.575
8	(Puerto Rico) Luis Rivera	6.2	8.150		14.350

=== Vault ===
Position	Gymnast	D Score	E Score	Penalty	Score 1	D Score	E Score	Penalty	Score 2	Total
1st place, gold medalist(s)	(Brazil) Diego Hypólito	6.6	9.525		16.125	6.6	9.600		16.200	16.162
2nd place, silver medalist(s)	(Chile) Tomás González	6.6	9.500		16.100	6.2	9.575		15.775	15.937
3rd place, bronze medalist(s)	(Puerto Rico) Luis Rivera	6.2	9.575		15.775	6.2	9.500		15.700	15.737
4	(Canada) AJ Rayment	6.2	9.375		15.575	6.2	9.575		15.775	15.675
5	(Venezuela) Fernando Fuentes	6.2	9.375		15.575	6.6	9.175	-0.3	15.475	15.525
6	(Colombia) James Brochero	6.2	9.400		15.600	6.6	8.550		15.150	15.375
7	(Puerto Rico) Alexander Rodríguez Colon	6.2	9.425		15.625	5.4	9.400	-0.3	14.500	15.062
8	(Dominican Republic) Jesus Vidal	6.2	9.125	-0.1	15.225	6.6	8.550	-0.3	14.850	15.037

=== Parallel bars ===
Rank	Name	A Score	B Score	Penalty	Total
1st place, gold medalist(s)	(United States) Justin Spring	6.5	9.050		15.550
2nd place, silver medalist(s)	(Colombia) Jorge Hugo Giraldo	6.3	9.000		15.300
3rd place, bronze medalist(s)	(Puerto Rico) Luis Vargas	6.3	8.850		15.150
4	(Venezuela) José Luis Fuentes	6.2	8.850		15.050
5	(Cuba) Gerardo Medina	5.9	8.900		14.800
6	(Cuba) Carlos Manuel Campaña	5.9	8.825		14.725
7	(Brazil) Luis Anjos	6.1	8.475		14.575
8	(United States) Guillermo Alvarez	4.4	8.600		13.000

=== Horizontal bar ===
Rank	Name	A Score	B Score	Penalty	Total
1st place, gold medalist(s)	(Brazil) Mosiah Rodrigues	6.0	8.625		14.625
2nd place, silver medalist(s)	(Colombia) Jorge Hugo Giraldo	5.8	8.750		14.550
3rd place, bronze medalist(s)	(Brazil) Danilo Nogueira	5.5	8.950		14.450
4	(Cuba) Irving Arroyo	5.6	8.700		14.300
5	(Argentina) Lucas Matias Chiarlo	5.4	8.875		14.275
6	(United States) Justin Spring	6.1	8.075		14.175
7	(United States) Todd Thornton	5.8	8.175		13.975
8	(Puerto Rico) Alexander Rodríguez Colon	6.1	7.625		13.725

== Women's artistic gymnastics ==
=== Team competition ===
Rank	Team	Vault (gymnastics)	Uneven bars	Balance beam	Floor (gymnastics)	Total
1st place, gold medalist(s)	United States	59.975 (1)	60.750 (1)	63.400 (1)	59.100 (2)	243.225
1st place, gold medalist(s)	Rebecca Bross	14.950	14.725	15.725	15.100	243.225
1st place, gold medalist(s)	Ivana Hong	14.600	14.875	15.550	13.725	243.225
1st place, gold medalist(s)	Shawn Johnson	15.125	15.325	16.250	15.150	243.225
1st place, gold medalist(s)	Nastia Liukin		15.825	15.875		243.225
1st place, gold medalist(s)	Samantha Peszek	14.900	13.975	14.650	14.125	243.225
1st place, gold medalist(s)	Amber Trani	15.000			14.725	243.225
2nd place, silver medalist(s)	Brazil	58.775 (2)	59.500 (2)	59.025 (2)	59.425 (1)	236.725
2nd place, silver medalist(s)	Jade Barbosa	15.150	15.000	15.175	15.325	236.725
2nd place, silver medalist(s)	Khiuani Dias	14.800	14.800	14.550	13.075	236.725
2nd place, silver medalist(s)	Daniele Hypólito	13.900	14.550	14.700	14.600	236.725
2nd place, silver medalist(s)	Daiane dos Santos				15.150	236.725
2nd place, silver medalist(s)	Ana Silva	12.450	14.225	14.225		236.725
2nd place, silver medalist(s)	Laís Souza	14.925	15.150	14.600	14.350	236.725
3rd place, bronze medalist(s)	Canada	55.800 (5)	55.475 (4)	56.825 (3)	54.475 (4)	222.575
3rd place, bronze medalist(s)	Stéphanie Desjardins-Labelle	13.575		12.775	13.750	222.575
3rd place, bronze medalist(s)	Christine Peng-Peng Lee	14.050	13.425	14.475	14.325	222.575
3rd place, bronze medalist(s)	Ti Liu		13.975	13.750		222.575
3rd place, bronze medalist(s)	Charlotte Mackie	14.025	14.125	14.725	12.825	222.575
3rd place, bronze medalist(s)	Brittany Rogers	14.150	13.950		13.075	222.575
3rd place, bronze medalist(s)	Emma Willis	13.175	12.800	13.875	13.325	222.575
4	Cuba	56.275 (4)	54.225 (5)	56.525 (4)	51.725 (6)	218.750
4	Jennifer Alique			14.300	11.875	218.750
4	Rosmery Brossard	13.950	12.425		12.525	218.750
4	Dunas Lamas	13.425	13.200	13.525	12.900	218.750
4	Dayana Rodríguez	13.850	13.050	13.625		218.750
4	Yahanara Sese	13.850	14.000	14.300	12.450	218.750
4	Madelen Tamayo	14.625	13.975	14.300	13.850	218.750
5	Argentina	54.750 (6)	47.850 (6)	54.225 (6)	54.025 (5)	210.850
5	Celeste Carnavale	12.800	11.650	12.575		210.850
5	Virginia Deluzio	13.600	12.050	14.400	13.950	210.850
5	Nadir Domeneghini					210.850
5	Sol Poliandri	13.650	9.875	12.550	14.025	210.850
5	Florencia Salomon	13.825	11.925	13.775	12.550	210.850
5	Ayelén Tarabini	13.675	12.225	13.475	13.500	210.850
6	Puerto Rico	53.000 (7)	46.050 (7)	52.325 (7)	51.225 (7)	202.700
6	Jasleidy García	12.575		12.350	12.350	202.700
6	Beatrice García		9.875			202.700
6	Leysha López	13.675	12.100	12.375	11.475	202.700
6	Mariecarmen Rivera	13.300	10.325	13.675	12.550	202.700
6	Sidney Sanabría	12.850	12.550	13.300	14.075	202.700
6	Gabriella Sanguineti	13.175	11.075	12.975	12.350	202.700
-	Mexico	56.925 (3)	56.875 (3)	54.700 (5)	55.125 (3)	DSQ
-	Maricela Cantú	13.725	13.800	14.075	14.350	DSQ
-	Yessenia Estrada	14.075	14.050	13.200	13.525	DSQ
-	Érika Garcia			13.125		DSQ
-	Elsa García	14.800	15.075	14.300	13.525	DSQ
-	Yeny Ibarra	14.325	13.950	12.900	13.725	DSQ

On July 19, 2007, the Pan American Sports Organization determined that the Mexican women's team, which had originally won the bronze medal, would be disqualified. The Mexican federation had registered the sixth team member, Marisela Arizmendi, as an official instead of an athlete. The bronze medal was reawarded to the Canadian team, who had initially finished in fourth place.

=== Individual all-around ===
Rank	Gymnast	Vault (gymnastics)	Uneven bars	Balance beam	Floor (gymnastics)	Total
1st place, gold medalist(s)	(United States) Shawn Johnson	15.175	15.275	16.175	15.100	61.725
2nd place, silver medalist(s)	(United States) Rebecca Bross	14.850	15.175	15.925	15.100	61.050
3rd place, bronze medalist(s)	(United States) Ivana Hong	14.950	14.325	15.575	14.525	59.375
4	(Brazil) Jade Barbosa	15.850	13.675	14.775	15.025	59.325
5	(Brazil) Daniele Hypólito	13.900	14.100	14.700	14.600	57.300
5	(Canada) Christine Peng-Peng Lee	14.025	13.225	15.475	14.575	57.300
7	(Mexico) Elsa García	14.625	13.225	13.775	14.575	56.200
8	(Cuba) Madelen Tamayo	14.575	14.200	13.825	13.225	55.825
9	(Brazil) Khiuani Dias	14.900	13.775	14.725	12.225	55.625
10	(Mexico) Yeny Ibarra	14.350	13.600	13.375	13.875	55.200
11	(Colombia) Nathalia Sánchez	13.825	13.950	14.000	13.025	54.800
11	(Mexico) Marisela Cantú	13.925	13.300	13.450	14.125	54.800
13	(Colombia) Jessica Gil	14.450	12.200	13.675	14.075	54.400
14	(Colombia) Bibiana Vélez	13.975	13.800	12.925	13.600	54.300
15	(Argentina) Virginia Deluzio	13.750	13.575	13.250	13.475	54.050
16	(Canada) Charlotte Mackie	13.875	13.300	13.175	13.350	53.700
17	(Cuba) Yahanara Sese	13.800	13.400	13.225	12.775	53.200
18	(Cuba) Dunas Lamas	13.675	13.375	12.725	13.350	53.125
19	(Guatemala) Emely Monzon	12.950	12.750	14.325	13.075	53.100
20	(Argentina) Ayelén Tarabini	13.775	12.050	13.425	13.025	52.275
20	(Venezuela) Jessica López	12.875	13.825	12.600	12.975	52.275
22	(Puerto Rico) Sidney Sanabria	13.425	12.400	13.200	12.675	51.700
23	(Argentina) Florencia Salomon	13.800	11.050	12.975	13.700	51.525
24	(Canada) Emma Willis	13.300	12.300	13.025	12.850	51.475

=== Vault ===
Position	Gymnast	D Score	E Score	Penalty	Score 1	D Score	E Score	Penalty	Score 2	Total
1st place, gold medalist(s)	(Brazil) Jade Barbosa	5.8	9.500		15.300	5.2	9.325		14.525	14.912
2nd place, silver medalist(s)	(United States) Amber Trani	5.8	9.225		15.025	5.2	9.225		14.425	14.725
3rd place, bronze medalist(s)	(Brazil) Laís Souza	5.5	9.375		14.875	5.2	9.225		14.425	14.650
4	(Mexico) Elsa García	5.5	9.300		14.800	4.8	9.325		14.125	14.462
5	(Mexico) Yeny Ibarra	5.9	8.250		14.150	5.2	9.175		14.375	14.262
6	(Canada) Charlotte Mackie	5.0	9.175		14.175	5.0	9.025		14.125	14.100
7	(Colombia) Jessica Gil	5.5	9.025		14.525	4.8	8.825	-0.1	13.525	14.025
8	(Cuba) Yahanara Sese	5.5	8.325	-0.1	13.725	4.6	9.350		13.950	13.837

=== Uneven bars ===
Rank	Gymnast	A Score	B Score	Pen.	Total
1st place, gold medalist(s)	(United States) Shawn Johnson	6.2	9.275		15.475
2nd place, silver medalist(s)	(United States) Nastia Liukin	7.1	8.350		15.450
3rd place, bronze medalist(s)	(Brazil) Laís Souza	6.6	8.500		15.100
4	(Mexico) Elsa García	6.3	8.750		15.050
5	(Cuba) Yahanara Sese	6.3	8.100	-0.1	14.300
6	(Brazil) Ana Silva	6.2	7.725		13.925
7	(Canada) Charlotte Mackie	5.8	7.800		13.600
8	(Mexico) Yessenia Estrada	5.8	7.650	-0.3	13.150

=== Balance beam ===
Rank	Gymnast	A Score	B Score	Pen.	Total
1st place, gold medalist(s)	(United States) Shawn Johnson	6.9	9.250		16.150
2nd place, silver medalist(s)	(United States) Nastia Liukin	6.5	9.400		15.900
3rd place, bronze medalist(s)	(Brazil) Daniele Hypólito	6.4	8.975		15.375
4	(Brazil) Jade Barbosa	6.3	8.600		14.900
5	(Mexico) Elsa García	6.1	8.425		14.525
6	(Canada) Charlotte Mackie	6.1	8.325		14.425
7	(Argentina) Virginia Deluzio	5.5	8.375		13.875
8	(Canada) Christine Peng-Peng Lee	6.4	6.850		13.250

=== Floor exercise ===
Rank	Gymnast	A Score	B Score	Pen.	Total
1st place, gold medalist(s)	(United States) Rebecca Bross	6.0	9.250		15.250
2nd place, silver medalist(s)	(United States) Shawn Johnson	6.0	9.225		15.225
3rd place, bronze medalist(s)	(Brazil) Jade Barbosa	6.0	9.125	-0.1	15.025
4	(Canada) Christine Peng-Peng Lee	5.8	8.765	-0.1	14.375
5	(Argentina) Sol Poliandri	5.0	8.800		13.800
6	(Puerto Rico) Sidney Sanabria	5.3	8.425		13.725
7	(Brazil) Daniele Hypólito	5.5	8.025		13.525
8	(Mexico) Marisela Cantú	5.0	8.425	-0.3	13.150

== See also ==
- Pan American Gymnastics Championships
- South American Gymnastics Championships
- Gymnastics at the 2008 Summer Olympics
