= Andreina Acevedo =

Venezuelan rhythmic gymnast (born 1990)

- Full name: Andreina Acevedo Martinez
- Born: 16 March 1990 (age 36) Valencia, Venezuela

Gymnastics career
- Discipline: Rhythmic gymnastics
- Country represented: Venezuela (2010-2013)
- Retired: yes
Medal record
Representing Venezuela
South American Games
Silver medal – second place	2010 Medellín	All-Around
Bronze medal – third place	2010 Medellín	Team
Bronze medal – third place	2010 Medellín	Rope
Bronze medal – third place	2010 Medellín	Ball
Central American and Caribbean Games
Silver medal – second place	2010 Mayagüez	Team
Gold medal – first place	2010 Mayagüez	Rope
Gold medal – first place	2010 Mayagüez	Ball
Silver medal – second place	2010 Mayagüez	All-Around
Bronze medal – third place	2010 Mayagüez	Ribbon

Andreina Acevedo Martinez (born 16 March 1990) is a former Venezuelan rhythmic gymnast. She represented her country at international level.

== Biography ==
In March 2010, Andreina won bronze in teams, with rope and with ball, silver in the All-Around at the South American Games in Medellin. In July she won team silver along Leiyineth Medrano and Katherine Arias, as well as silver in the All-Around bronze with ribbon and gold with rope and ball at the Central American and Caribbean Games. In September she was selected for the World Championships in Moscow, taking 91st place in the All-Around, 97th with rope, 95th with hoop, 88th with ball, 90thwith ribbon and 34th in teams. In December she was 6th in teams and 8th in the All-Around at the Pan American Championships.

In 2011 she was 97th in the All-Around, 88th with hoop, 101st with ball, 102nd with clubs and 90th with ribbon at the World Championships in Montpellier.

At the 2013 World Championships in Kyiv she finished 80th in the All-Around, 82nd with hoop, 76th with ball, 69th with clubs and 84th with ribbon.
