= Gymnastics at the 2010 South American Games =

- Venue: Coliseo de Gimnasia
- Dates: March 22–29

Gymnastics at the 2010 South American Games in Medellín was held from March 22 to March 29. All events were competed at Coliseo de Gimnasia.

== Medal summary ==
=== Medal table ===
Rank	Nation	Gold	Silver	Bronze	Total
1	Brazil (BRA)	12	9	4	25
2	Venezuela (VEN)	6	4	5	15
3	Colombia (COL)	5	6	0	11
4	Argentina (ARG)	0	3	7	10
5	Chile (CHI)	0	1	3	4
6	Ecuador (ECU)	0	0	2	2
Totals (6 entries)		23	23	21	67

== Gymnastics Artistic ==
This event was held from 22 March to 24 March.

=== Men ===
Event	Gold	Silver	Bronze
Team all-around	Francisco Barreto Júnior; Diego Hypólito; Mosiah Rodrigues; Victor Rosa; Sérgio Sasaki; Arthur Zanetti; Brazil	Juan Guillermo Escobar; Jorge Giraldo; Didier Lugo; Fabian Galvis; Sergio Restrepo; Javier Afanador; Colombia	Nicolas Cordoba; Mario Gorosito; Juan Manuel Lompizano; Osvaldo Erazun; Juan Sebastián Melchiori; Federico Molinari; Argentina
Individual all-around	Jorge Giraldo; Colombia	Didier Lugo; Colombia	Tomás González; Chile
Floor exercise	Diego Hypólito; Brazil	Tomás González; Chile	Victor Rosa; Brazil
Pommel horse	Jorge Giraldo; Colombia	Didier Lugo; Colombia	Mosiah Rodrigues; Brazil
Still rings	Arthur Zanetti; Brazil	Didier Lugo; Colombia	Federico Molinari; Argentina
Vault	Diego Hypólito; Brazil	Sérgio Sasaki; Brazil	Tomás González; Chile
Parallel bars	Jorge Giraldo; Colombia	José Luis Fuentes; Venezuela	Tomás González; Chile
Horizontal bar	Didier Lugo; Colombia	Mosiah Rodrigues; Brazil	José Luis Fuentes; Venezuela

=== Women ===
Event	Gold	Silver	Bronze
Team all-around	Leticia Costa; Anna Carolina Cardoso; Priscila Cobello; Ethiene Franco; Bruna Leal; Ana Silva; Brazil	Yuri Avendaño; Catalina Escobar; Gabriela Gomez; Marcela Sandoval; Bibiana Vélez; Colombia	Eliana Gonzalez; Jessica López; Yarimar Medina; Maciel Pena; Cindy Ruiz; Johanny Sotillo; Venezuela
Individual all-around	Jessica López; Venezuela	Bruna Leal; Brazil	Priscila Cobello; Brazil
Vault	Catalina Escobar; Colombia	Leticia Costa; Brazil	Elid Helwigg; Ecuador Ayelén Tarabini; Argentina
Uneven bars	Jessica López; Venezuela	Catalina Escobar; Colombia	Bruna Leal; Brazil
Balance beam	Jessica López; Venezuela	Bruna Leal; Brazil	Ayelén Tarabini; Argentina
Floor exercise	Jessica López; Venezuela	Bruna Leal; Brazil	Elid Helwigg; Ecuador

== Gymnastics Rhythmic ==
The events were held from 27 March to 29 March.

=== Medalists ===
Event	Gold	Silver	Bronze
All-around	Angélica Kvieczynski; Brazil	Andreina Acevedo; Venezuela	Darya Shara; Argentina
Team	Rafaela Costa; Drielly Daltoe; Angélica Kvieczynski; Eliane Sampaio; Brazil	Florencia Aracama; Ana Carrasco Pini; Ayelen Paez Pieri; Darya Shara; Argentina	Andreina Acevedo; Katherin Arias; Leiyineth Medrano; Michelle Sanchez; Venezuela
Rope	Angélica Kvieczynski; Brazil	Eliane Sampaio; Brazil	Andreina Acevedo; Venezuela
Hoop	Angélica Kvieczynski; Brazil	Ayelen Paez Pieri; Argentina	Ana Carrasco Pini; Argentina
Ball	Angélica Kvieczynski; Brazil	Katherin Arias; Venezuela	Andreina Acevedo; Venezuela
Ribbon	Angélica Kvieczynski; Brazil	Darya Shara; Argentina	Ayelen Paez Pieri; Argentina
Group All-around	Ana Alencar; Larissa Barata; Leticia Dutra; Luisa Matsuo; Ana Ribeiro; Ana Scheffer; Brazil	Leiyineth Medrano; Michelle Sanchez; Marian Parra; Nathalia Serrano; Alejandra Vasquez; Venezuela	None awarded
5 Hoops	Leiyineth Medrano; Michelle Sanchez; Marian Parra; Nathalia Serrano; Alejandra Vasquez; Venezuela	Ana Alencar; Larissa Barata; Leticia Dutra; Luisa Matsuo; Ana Ribeiro; Ana Scheffer; Brazil	None awarded
3 Ribbons and 2 Ropes	Leiyineth Medrano; Michelle Sanchez; Marian Parra; Nathalia Serrano; Alejandra Vasquez; Venezuela	Ana Alencar; Larissa Barata; Leticia Dutra; Luisa Matsuo; Ana Ribeiro; Ana Scheffer; Brazil	None awarded
