= Julie Zetlin =

American rhythmic gymnast

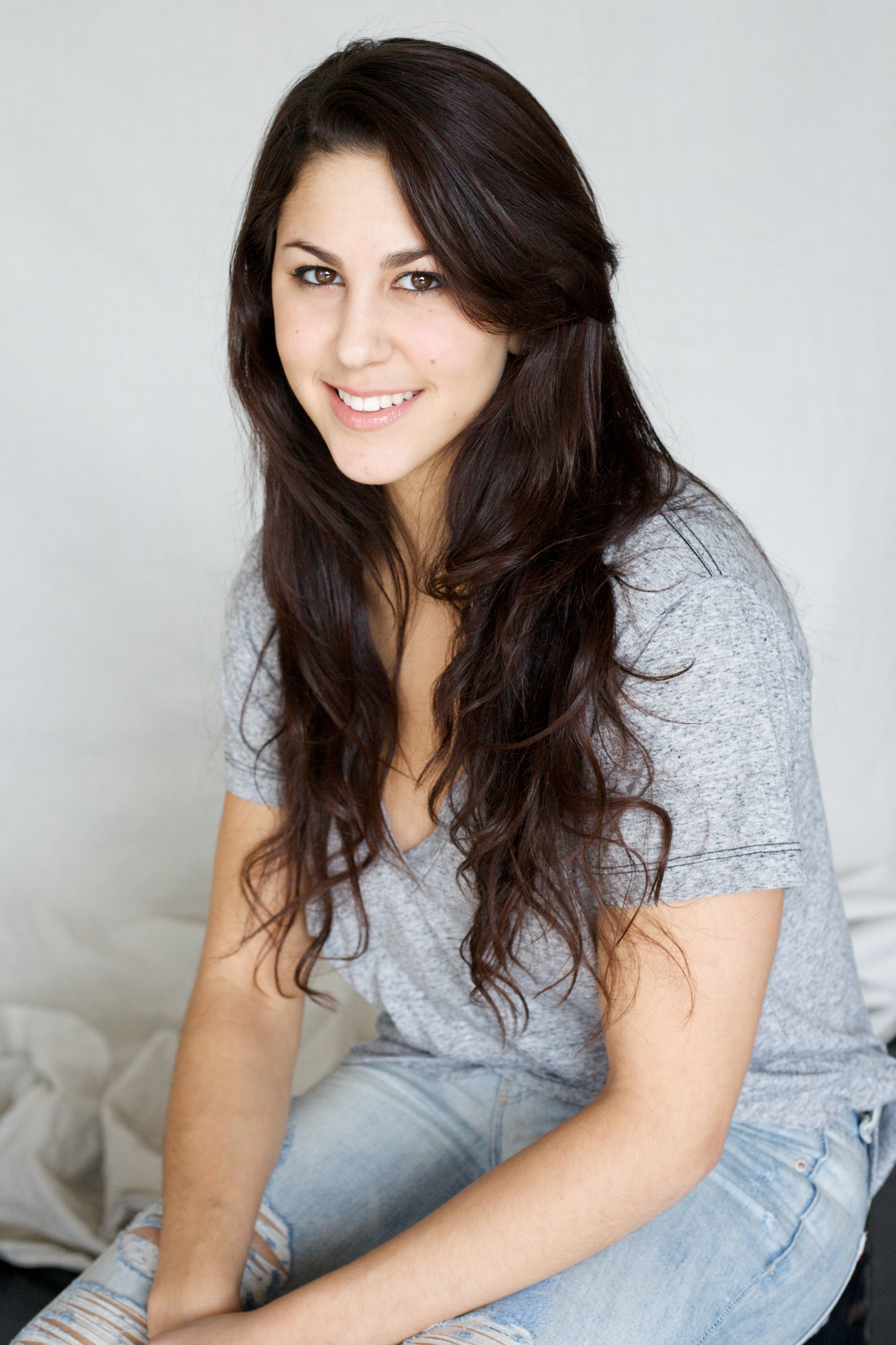
- Zetlin in 2017

Personal information
- Full name: Julie Ashley Zetlin
- Born: June 30, 1990 (age 36)

Gymnastics career
- Discipline: Rhythmic gymnastics
- Country represented: United States (2003–12)
- Gym: Capital Rhythmics
- Head coach: Olga Kutuzova
- Retired: 2012
Medal record
Rhythmic gymnastics
Representing the United States
Pan American Games
Gold medal – first place	2011 Guadalajara	All-around
Gold medal – first place	2011 Guadalajara	Ball
Gold medal – first place	2011 Guadalajara	Ribbon
Silver medal – second place	2007 Rio de Janeiro	Ribbon
Silver medal – second place	2011 Guadalajara	Hoop
Pacific Rim Championships
Gold medal – first place	2012 Everett	All-around
Gold medal – first place	2012 Everett	Ribbon
Gold medal – first place	2012 Everett	Ball

Julie Ashley Zetlin (born June 30, 1990) is a retired elite rhythmic gymnast. She is the 2010 U.S. Senior National Champion in Rhythmic Gymnastics, and represented the United States at the 2012 Olympic Games.

== Personal life ==
Zetlin is Jewish, and her mother Zsuzsi is a former Hungarian national champion in the sport.

== Career ==
Zetlin began rhythmic gymnastics instruction at the age of four. She has been a member of the U.S. junior and senior national rhythmic gymnastics teams since 2004. She trained with longtime coach Olga Kutuzova at Capital Rhythmics in Darnestown, Maryland.

=== Junior career ===
In her final year as a junior competitor, Zetlin placed second all-around at 2005 Junior U.S. National Championships in Indianapolis, Indiana, and she won the junior titles on rope, hoop, clubs and ribbon. In 2002, she competed in her first Junior Nationals in Cleveland, Ohio, where she placed 12th all-around. At 2004 Junior Nationals in Nashville, Tennessee, she placed second in the all-around, rope, clubs and ribbon, as well as third in ball.

=== Senior career ===
In 2006, her first year in senior competition, she finished fourth all-around at 2006 Nationals in St. Paul, Minnesota, and she placed first in rope and clubs. She also placed fifth all-around and fourth in rope at the 2006 Pacific Alliance Championships in Honolulu, Hawaii, where the U.S. captured the team gold medal. She notched a third-place finish in the all-around at 2007 Nationals in San Jose, California, where she won ribbon, placed second in hoop and placed third in ribbon and clubs.

Zetlin placed fourth all-around at 2008 Nationals in Houston, Texas, where she earned third-place finishes in rope, clubs, and ribbon. At 2009 Nationals in Dallas, Texas, Zetlin placed third in the all-around, rope, ribbon and ball, and she earned a fourth-place finish in hoop.

Zetlin placed 23rd all-around (99.025) at the 2010 World Rhythmic Gymnastics Championships in Moscow, Russia, where she became the first U.S gymnast to advance to the world all-around finals since Mary Sanders in 2003. At the 2010 Pan American Games in Guadalajara, Mexico, Zetlin won the all-around, rope and ball, and she placed third in ribbon. The U.S. also earned the team silver medal in rhythmic gymnastics.

She captured the all-around title at the 2010 U.S. National Rhythmic Gymnastics Championships, along with first-place finishes in hoop, ball and ribbon. She earned a second-place finish in rope.

In September 2011, Zetlin was named to the U.S. team for the 2011 Rhythmic World Championships, which took place during September in Montpellier, France. She was the top finisher from the continent, and therefore she was in top contention for the wildcard for the 2012 Olympic Games. At the 2011 Pan-American Games in Guadalajara, Mexico during October, Zetlin captured gold medals in the all-around, ball and ribbon.

She was awarded a wildcard for the 2012 Olympic Games as the highest ranked gymnast from the Americas. At the Olympic Games, she placed 21st in the qualifications and did not advance into the finals.

== Legacy ==
On December 15, 2015, it was announced that Zetlin had been inducted as a 2016 class of the USA Gymnastics Hall of Fame.

== See also ==
- List of Jewish gymnasts
