= Mariam Chamilova =

Canadian rhythmic gymnast (born 1994)

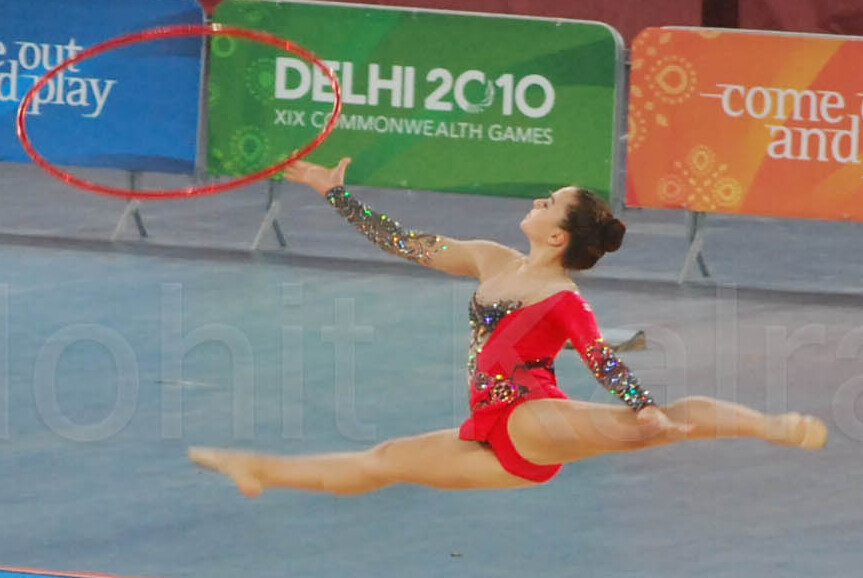

Personal information
- Born: January 10, 1994 (age 32) Russia
- Height: 167 cm (5 ft 6 in)

Gymnastics career
- Discipline: Rhythmic gymnastics
- Country represented: Canada (2010-2011)
- Club: Kalev
- Head coach: Svetlana Joukova
- Retired: yes
Medal record
Pan American Championships
Silver medal – second place	2010 Guadalajara	Hoop
Bronze medal – third place	2010 Guadalajara	Team
Commonwealth Games
Silver medal – second place	2010 Delhi	Team
Pan American Games
Bronze medal – third place	2011 Guadalajara	Clubs

Mariam Chamilova (born 10 January 1994) is a retired Canadian rhythmic gymnast of Russian descent. She represented her country in international competitions.

== Career ==
Mariam took up rhythmic gymnastics after a friend of her mother's, who was a coach in the sport, encouraged her mom to sign her up for classes. In 2009 she was crowned Canadian junior champion.

She became a senior in 2010, debuting in January at the World Cup in Montreal where she was 15th in the All-Around. In Corbeil-Essonnes she finished 27th overall. In May she took 16th place in the All-Around at the stage in Minsk. In late August she took 52nd place at the stage in Pesaro. She was then selected for the World Championships in Moscow, she was 24th in teams, 57th in the All-Around, 52nd with rope, 84th with hoop, 59th with ball and 60th with ribbon. In October she was part of the Canadian delegation at the Commonwealth Games in Delhi, being 4th with ribbon, 5th with ball and in the All-Around, 6th with hoop, 7th with rope and won silver in teams along Demetra Mantcheva and Alexandra Martincek. In December ahe won team bronze and silver with hoop, being promoted of one place after Ruth Castillo Galindo was disqualified, at the Pan American Championships. That year she also won the senior Canadian Championships.

In 2011 she competed in the World Cup in Montreal, taking 8th place overall and with hoop, 7th with clubs and 6th with ball. In March she competed in Pesaro, being 31st in the All-Around. In the stage in Kyiv she took 16th place overall. In September Chamilova took part in the World Championships in Montpellier, finishing 67th in the All-Around, 71st with hoop, 74th with ball, 64th with clubs, 61st with ribbon and 20th in teams. A month later she was selected to represent Canada at the Pan American Games in Guadalajara, she was 4th in the All-Around, with hoop and with ball, 5th with ribbon and won bronze in the clubs' final.

Mariam retired the following year after failing to qualify for the 2012 Olympic Games. She then graduated with a degree in law and started working in a law firm.
