= Shelby Kisiel =

American rhythmic gymnast

- Born: November 7, 1994 (age 31)

Gymnastics career
- Discipline: Rhythmic gymnastics
- Country represented: United States; (2010-2011 (?))

Shelby Kisiel (born November 7, 1994) is an American individual rhythmic gymnast. She represents her nation at international competitions. She competed at world championships, including at the 2010 and 2011 World Rhythmic Gymnastics Championships.
