= Lisa Wang =

American rhythmic gymnast and entrepreneur

- Born: September 24, 1988 (age 37) Madison, Wisconsin, U.S.

Gymnastics career
- Discipline: Rhythmic gymnastics
- Country represented: United States (2000-2008)
- Club: Northshore Rhythmics
- Head coach: Natalia Klimouk
- Assistant coach: Dani Takova
- Former coach: Lana Lashoff
Medal record
Rhythmic Gymnastics
Representing United States
Pan American Games
Gold medal – first place	2007 Rio de Janeiro	All-around
Gold medal – first place	2007 Rio de Janeiro	Ribbon
Silver medal – second place	2007 Rio de Janeiro	Clubs
Silver medal – second place	2007 Rio de Janeiro	Rope
Visa Championships
Gold medal – first place	2008 Houston	All-around
Gold medal – first place	2008 Houston	Clubs
Gold medal – first place	2008 Houston	Hoop
Gold medal – first place	2008 Houston	Ribbon
Gold medal – first place	2008 Houston	Rope
Gold medal – first place	2007 San Jose	All-around

Lisa Wang (born September 24, 1988) is the founder and CEO of Bad Bitch Empire - a venture platform that focuses on woman founders & investors. She was the CEO and co-founder of SheWorx entrepreneurship platform for women and startup funding, and an American rhythmic gymnast of Chinese descent. She is four-time US National Champion, winning once as a junior and three times as a senior, and the 2007 Pan American Games Champion. Wang was a key member of the U.S. senior national team, representing the United States at three World Championships. Wang retired in 2008 after gaining admission to Yale University.

In 2014, Wang was recognized for her landmark contributions to the progress of gymnastics in America, and was inducted into the USA Gymnastics Hall of Fame. Through SheWorx, Wang evangelizes the rise of women in entrepreneurship and in senior executive positions. Her foundation matches women-led startups with funding.

== Gymnastics career ==
=== Junior career ===
Wang began rhythmic gymnastics training in 1998, when she was ten years old. In 2000, Wang became a part of the National Team. In 2001, she claimed her first Junior National Championship at the Visa National Championships. Soon after, she began taking on the international scene and went on to sweep all golds at the 2002 Pacific Alliance Championships in Vancouver, British Columbia, Canada as the 1st place All-Around Champion and leading the 1st place US team.

=== Senior career ===
Wang reigned as three-time Senior US National Champion (2006, 2007, 2008) winning three straight US all-around titles and 11 individual event titles. and 2008. In 2007, she became the All-around Pan American Games Champion in Rio de Janeiro, Brazil. marking her place as the top gymnast in North and South America. She is a five-time Pan American Games gold medalist, helped team USA win gold in 2003, and also competed in the 2005 Pan American Championships. She was a three-time World Championships team member (2003, 2005, 2007).

During the 2007 World Championships (which serve as the 2008 Summer Olympics qualifier), Wang was the most heavily favored American Rhythmic Gymnast for the 2008 Olympics. But she placed 28th and thus missed Olympic qualification by three-tenths of a point. The United States Olympic Committee denied her application to apply for the Tripartite wild card spot, despite support from USA Gymnastics, thus removing her last chance to compete at the 2008 Olympics.

Wang graduated from Adlai E. Stevenson High School in Lincolnshire, Illinois in December 2006. After being accepted into Yale University Early Action, Wang decided to defer matriculation for a year in order to continue training. Her life and gap year were documented by the national best-seller "Fat Envelope Frenzy". In 2007, she shot an international commercial "Women in Control" in Brazil for a Netherland-based Water Company.

In May 2008, Wang competed in her last National Championship in Houston, Texas. She swept all 5 Gold Medals in addition to winning the All-Around Title and Athlete of the Year. Wang attended Yale University as the Class of 2012.

In 2014, Wang was inducted into the USA Gymnastics Hall of Fame.

== Professional career ==
Wang began her professional career as a hedge fund analyst at Balyasny Asset Management. She later transitioned into entrepreneurship, founding her first company, Fooze, in 2015 that was incubated in the second class of Food-X, the first international food business accelerator.

=== SheWorx ===
Wang is the CEO and co-founder of SheWorx, a global community empowering female entrepreneurs to build and scale successful companies. Recognized as one of a few top women driving gender parity in entrepreneurship, she is a regular speaker on topics including women in business, artificial intelligence and fulfillment. In June 2019, Republic acquired SheWorx & Wang has since left Republic to start her new project - "Bad Bitch Empire".
