= Complejo Nissan de Gimnasia =

Stadium in Mexico

Complejo Nissa de Gimnasia
- Location: Guadalajara, Jalisco
- Capacity: 3,434

Construction
- Opened: February 29, 2008

Tenant
- 2011 Pan American Games

The Nissan Gymnastics Stadium is a stadium located in Guadalajara, Jalisco. It opened in February 2008 and hosted the gymnastics competition at the 2011 Pan American Games. It has a capacity of 3,434.

== See also ==
- Gymnastics at the 2011 Pan American Games
