= Mexico at the 2023 Pan American Games =

- IOC code: MEX
- NOC: Mexican Olympic Committee
- Website: www.soycom.org (in Spanish)

in Santiago, Chile 20 October 2023 – 5 November 2023
- Competitors: 640 in 35 sports
- Flag bearers (opening): Carlos Sansores & Karina Esquer
- Flag bearers (closing): Isaac Pérez & Alejandra Valencia
- Medals Ranked 3rd: Gold 52 Silver 38 Bronze 52 Total 142

Pan American Games appearances (overview)
- 1951; 1955; 1959; 1963; 1967; 1971; 1975; 1979; 1983; 1987; 1991; 1995; 1999; 2003; 2007; 2011; 2015; 2019; 2023; 2027

Mexico competed at the 2023 Pan American Games in Santiago, Chile from 20 October to 5 November 2023. This was the country's 19th appearance at the Pan American Games, having competed at every one since the inaugural edition in 1951.

Taekwondo athlete Carlos Sansores and basketball player Karina Esquer were the country's flagbearers during the opening ceremony. Meanwhile, basque pelota athlete Isaac Pérez and archer Alejandra Valencia were the country's flagbearers during the closing ceremony.

== Medalists ==
Medal	Name	Sport	Event	Date
1st place, gold medalist(s)	William Arroyo	Taekwondo	Men's Individual Poomsae	21 October
1st place, gold medalist(s)	Edson Ramírez	Shooting	Men's 10m Air Rifle	21 October
1st place, gold medalist(s)	Brandon Plaza	Taekwondo	Men's 58 kg	21 October
1st place, gold medalist(s)	Daniela Souza	Taekwondo	Women's 49 kg	21 October
1st place, gold medalist(s)	Gabriela Agúndez	Diving	Women's 10m Platform	21 October
1st place, gold medalist(s)	Osmar Olvera	Diving	Men's 1m Springboard	21 October
1st place, gold medalist(s)	William Arroyo; Cecilia Lee	Taekwondo	Mixed Poomsae Pairs	22 October
1st place, gold medalist(s)	Citlali Cristian	Athletics	Women's Marathon	22 October
1st place, gold medalist(s)	Leslie Soltero	Taekwondo	Women's 67 kg	22 October
1st place, gold medalist(s)	Kevin Berlín; Randal Willars	Diving	Men's Synchronized 10m Platform	22 October
1st place, gold medalist(s)	Mayan Oliver	Modern Pentathlon	Women's Individual	23 October
1st place, gold medalist(s)	Patricio Font	Water Skiing	Men's Tricks	23 October
1st place, gold medalist(s)	Carlos Sansores	Taekwondo	Men's +80 kg	23 October
1st place, gold medalist(s)	Emiliano Hernández	Modern Pentathlon	Men's Individual	23 October
1st place, gold medalist(s)	Gabriela Agúndez; Alejandra Orozco	Diving	Women's Synchronized 10m Platform	23 October
1st place, gold medalist(s)	Osmar Olvera	Diving	Men's 3m Springboard	23 October
1st place, gold medalist(s)	Miguel Ángel Carballo; Alexis López	Rowing	Men's LM2X	24 October
1st place, gold medalist(s)	Paola Longoria	Racquetball	Women's Singles	24 October
1st place, gold medalist(s)	Alejandra Zavala	Shooting	Women's 25m Pistol	24 October
1st place, gold medalist(s)	Javier Mar; Rodrigo Montoya	Racquetball	Men's Doubles	24 October
1st place, gold medalist(s)	Daniela Gaxiola; Jessica Salazar; Yuli Verdugo	Cycling	Women's Team Sprint	24 October
1st place, gold medalist(s)	Rodrigo Diego; Osmar Olvera	Diving	Men's Synchronized 3m Springboard	24 October
1st place, gold medalist(s)	Kenia Lechuga	Rowing	Women's W1X	25 October
1st place, gold medalist(s)	Manuel Padilla; Tamara Vega	Modern Pentathlon	Mixed Relay	25 October
1st place, gold medalist(s)	Randal Willars	Diving	Men's 10m Platform	25 October
1st place, gold medalist(s)	Arantxa Chávez; Paola Pineda	Diving	Women's Synchronized 3m Springboard	25 October
1st place, gold medalist(s)	Alejandra Zavala	Shooting	Women's 10m Air Pistol	26 October
1st place, gold medalist(s)	Catherine Oliver; Mayan Oliver	Modern Pentathlon	Women’s Relay	26 October
1st place, gold medalist(s)	Alexandra Herrera; Paola Longoria; Montserrat Mejía	Racquetball	Women's Team	26 October
1st place, gold medalist(s)	Yareli Acevedo	Cycling	Women's Omnium	26 October
1st place, gold medalist(s)	Carlos Quezada	Shooting	Men’s 50m Rifle 3 Positions	27 October
1st place, gold medalist(s)	Carlos González; Andrea Ibarra	Shooting	Mixed Pairs Air Pistol	27 October
1st place, gold medalist(s)	Duilio Carrillo; Emiliano Hernández	Modern Pentathlon	Men’s Relay	27 October
1st place, gold medalist(s)	Marco Verde	Boxing	Men's 71 kg	27 October
1st place, gold medalist(s)	Fernando Nava; Ricardo Peña	Cycling	Men's Madison	27 October
1st place, gold medalist(s)	Nuria Diosdado; Joana Jiménez	Artistic Swimming	Duet	2 November
1st place, gold medalist(s)	Lizeth Rueda	Triathlon	Women’s Individual	2 November
1st place, gold medalist(s)	Mariana Aguilar	Sailing	Women’s iQFoil	3 November
1st place, gold medalist(s)	Regina Alferez; Marla Arellano; Nuria Diosdado; Daniela Estrada; Itzamary González; Joana Jiménez; Luiza Rubio; Jessica Sobrino; Pamela Toscano	Artistic Swimming	Team	3 November
1st place, gold medalist(s)	Karina Alanís; Beatriz Briones; Brenda Gutiérrez; Maricela Montemayor	Canoeing	Women’s K-4 500m	3 November
1st place, gold medalist(s)	Guadalupe Quintal	Karate	Women’s +68 kg	3 November
1st place, gold medalist(s)	Team Mexico	Football	Women’s Tournament	3 November
1st place, gold medalist(s)	Dafne Quintero	Archery	Women's Individual Compound	4 November
1st place, gold medalist(s)	Karina Alanís; Beatriz Briones	Canoeing	Women's K-2 500m	4 November
1st place, gold medalist(s)	Isaac Pérez	Basque Pelota	Men's Individual Fronton Rubber Ball	4 November
1st place, gold medalist(s)	David Álvarez	Basque Pelota	Men's Frontball	4 November
1st place, gold medalist(s)	Itzel Reyes	Basque Pelota	Women's Frontball	4 November
1st place, gold medalist(s)	Marifer Noriega	Basque Pelota	Women's Individual Fronton Rubber Ball	4 November
1st place, gold medalist(s)	Isaac Cruz; Jorge Olvera	Basque Pelota	Men's Frontenis	5 November
1st place, gold medalist(s)	Ariana Cepeda; Ximena Placito	Basque Pelota	Women's Frontenis	5 November
1st place, gold medalist(s)	Alejandra Valencia	Archery	Women's Individual Recurve	5 November
1st place, gold medalist(s)	Abraham Ancer	Golf	Men's Individual	5 November
2nd place, silver medalist(s)	Víctor Güemez	Weightlifting	Men's 61 kg	21 October
2nd place, silver medalist(s)	María José Mata	Swimming	Women's 200m Butterfly	21 October
2nd place, silver medalist(s)	Alejandra Orozco	Diving	Women's 10m Platform	21 October
2nd place, silver medalist(s)	Gabriela Rodríguez	Shooting	Women's Skeet	22 October
2nd place, silver medalist(s)	Jorge Iga	Swimming	Men's 200m Freestyle	22 October
2nd place, silver medalist(s)	Edson Ramírez; Goretti Zumaya	Shooting	Mixed Pairs Air Rifle	23 October
2nd place, silver medalist(s)	Catherine Oliver	Modern Pentathlon	Women's Individual	23 October
2nd place, silver medalist(s)	Duilio Carrillo	Modern Pentathlon	Men's Individual	23 October
2nd place, silver medalist(s)	Luis Gallardo; Gabriela Rodríguez	Shooting	Mixed Pairs Skeet	23 October
2nd place, silver medalist(s)	Ricardo Peña	Cycling	Men's Omnium	24 October
2nd place, silver medalist(s)	Arantxa Chávez	Diving	Women's 3m Springboard	24 October
2nd place, silver medalist(s)	Montserrat Mejía	Racquetball	Women's Singles	24 October
2nd place, silver medalist(s)	Victoria Heredia; Leslie Soltero; Fabiola Villegas	Taekwondo	Women's Team	24 October
2nd place, silver medalist(s)	Yareli Acevedo; Antonieta Gaxiola; Lizbeth Salazar; Victoria Velasco	Cycling	Women's Team Pursuit	25 October
2nd place, silver medalist(s)	Daniela Gaxiola	Cycling	Women's Keirin	25 October
2nd place, silver medalist(s)	Daniel Urquiza; Alejandra Zavala	Shooting	Mixed Pairs Air Pistol	27 October
2nd place, silver medalist(s)	Yuli Verdugo	Cycling	Women's Individual Sprint	27 October
2nd place, silver medalist(s)	Antonieta Gaxiola; Lizbeth Salazar	Cycling	Women's Madison	27 October
2nd place, silver medalist(s)	Miguel Martínez	Boxing	Men's 63.5 kg	27 October
2nd place, silver medalist(s)	Edna Carrillo	Judo	Women's 48 kg	28 October
2nd place, silver medalist(s)	Paulina Martínez	Judo	Women's 52 kg	28 October
2nd place, silver medalist(s)	Laura Galván	Athletics	Women's 10,000 m	30 October
2nd place, silver medalist(s)	Luis Avilés	Athletics	Men's 400 m	1 November
2nd place, silver medalist(s)	Dalia Alcocer; Sofia Flores; Julia Gutiérrez; Kimberly Salazar; Adirem Tejeda	Gymnastics	Group All-Around	2 November
2nd place, silver medalist(s)	Uziel Muñoz	Athletics	Men's Shot Put	3 November
2nd place, silver medalist(s)	Dalia Alcocer; Sofia Flores; Julia Gutiérrez; Kimberly Salazar; Adirem Tejeda	Gymnastics	Group 5 Hoops	3 November
2nd place, silver medalist(s)	Leonel Cárdenas; César Salazar	Squash	Men's Doubles	3 November
2nd place, silver medalist(s)	Jesús Tonatiú López	Athletics	Men's 800 m	4 November
2nd place, silver medalist(s)	Luis Avilés; Guillermo Campos; Valente Mendoza; Edgar Ramírez	Athletics	Men's 4 x 400m Relay	4 November
2nd place, silver medalist(s)	Dalia Alcocer; Sofia Flores; Julia Gutiérrez; Kimberly Salazar; Adirem Tejeda	Gymnastics	Group 3 Ribbons + 2 Balls	4 November
2nd place, silver medalist(s)	Aída Román; Ángela Ruiz; Alejandra Valencia	Archery	Women's Team Recurve	4 November
2nd place, silver medalist(s)	Matías Grande; Carlos Rojas; Caleb Urbina	Archery	Men's Team Recurve	4 November
2nd place, silver medalist(s)	Jorge Martínez	Roller Sports	Men's 200m Time Trial	4 November
2nd place, silver medalist(s)	Carlos Monsivais	Roller Sports	Men's 500m + Distance	5 November
2nd place, silver medalist(s)	Matías Grande	Archery	Men's Individual Recurve	5 November
2nd place, silver medalist(s)	Dulce Figueroa; Laura Puentes	Basque Pelota	Women's Trinquet Doubles	5 November
2nd place, silver medalist(s)	Daniel García; Arturo Rodríguez	Basque Pelota	Men's Trinquet Doubles	5 November
2nd place, silver medalist(s)	Carlos Villarreal	Karate	Men's 75 kg	5 November
3rd place, bronze medalist(s)	Cecilia Lee	Taekwondo	Women's Individual Poomsae	21 October
3rd place, bronze medalist(s)	Miguel de Lara	Swimming	Men's 100m Breaststroke	21 October
3rd place, bronze medalist(s)	Jorge Cárdenas	Weightlifting	Men's 73 kg	21 October
3rd place, bronze medalist(s)	Jordy Gutiérrez; Hugo Reyes	Rowing	Men's M2-	23 October
3rd place, bronze medalist(s)	Ricardo de la Rosa; Tomás Manzanillo; Rafael Mejía; Andre Simsch	Rowing	Men's M4X	23 October
3rd place, bronze medalist(s)	Victoria Heredia	Taekwondo	Women's +67 kg	23 October
3rd place, bronze medalist(s)	Andrés Puente	Swimming	Men's 200m Breaststroke	23 October
3rd place, bronze medalist(s)	Rodrigo Montoya	Racquetball	Men's Singles	23 October
3rd place, bronze medalist(s)	Eduardo Portillo	Racquetball	Men's Singles	23 October
3rd place, bronze medalist(s)	Jafet López; Juan Carlos Ruiz; Edgar Verdugo	Cycling	Men's Team Sprint	24 October
3rd place, bronze medalist(s)	Maite Arrillaga; María García; Mildred Mercado; Devanih Plata	Rowing	Women's W4-	24 October
3rd place, bronze medalist(s)	Paola Longoria; Eduardo Portillo	Racquetball	Mixed Doubles	24 October
3rd place, bronze medalist(s)	Alexandra Herrera; Montserrat Mejía	Racquetball	Women's Doubles	24 October
3rd place, bronze medalist(s)	Luis Ramón Garrido	Badminton	Men's Singles	24 October
3rd place, bronze medalist(s)	Natalia Escalera	Gymnastics	Women's Vault	24 October
3rd place, bronze medalist(s)	Job Castillo; Luis Montoya	Badminton	Men's Doubles	24 October
3rd place, bronze medalist(s)	Romina Fregoso; Miriam Rodríguez	Badminton	Women's Doubles	24 October
3rd place, bronze medalist(s)	Uriel Gómez; Carlos Navarro; Bryan Salazar	Taekwondo	Men's Team	24 October
3rd place, bronze medalist(s)	Juan José Flores	Rowing	Men's M1X	25 October
3rd place, bronze medalist(s)	Kenny Zamudio	Diving	Men's 10m Platform	25 October
3rd place, bronze medalist(s)	Isaac Núñez	Gymnastics	Men’s Parallel Bars	25 October
3rd place, bronze medalist(s)	Miranda Grana; Miriam Guevara; Fernanda Jiménez; María José Mata; Athena Meneses; Sofía Revilak; Melissa Rodríguez; Andrea Sansores	Swimming	Women's 4 x 100m Medley Relay	25 October
3rd place, bronze medalist(s)	Javier Mar; Rodrigo Montoya; Eduardo Portillo	Racquetball	Men's Team	26 October
3rd place, bronze medalist(s)	Citlalli Ortiz	Boxing	Women's 75 kg	26 October
3rd place, bronze medalist(s)	Team Mexico	Volleyball	Women’s Tournament	26 October
3rd place, bronze medalist(s)	Juan Carlos Ruiz	Cycling	Men's Keirin	27 October
3rd place, bronze medalist(s)	Team Mexico	Baseball	Tournament	28 October
3rd place, bronze medalist(s)	Arath Juárez	Judo	Men’s 60 kg	28 October
3rd place, bronze medalist(s)	Andrés Olivas	Athletics	Men's 20 km Walk	29 October
3rd place, bronze medalist(s)	Prisca Awiti	Judo	Women’s 63 kg	29 October
3rd place, bronze medalist(s)	Gilberto Cardoso	Judo	Men’s 73 kg	29 October
3rd place, bronze medalist(s)	Paulo Strehlke	Open Water Swimming	Men's 10 km	29 October
3rd place, bronze medalist(s)	Julieta Toledo	Fencing	Women’s Sabre	31 October
3rd place, bronze medalist(s)	Leonel Cárdenas	Squash	Men's Singles	1 November
3rd place, bronze medalist(s)	César Salazar	Squash	Men's Singles	1 November
3rd place, bronze medalist(s)	Marcos Madrid	Table Tennis	Men's Singles	1 November
3rd place, bronze medalist(s)	Sandra Góngora; Iliana Lomelí	Bowling	Women's Doubles	2 November
3rd place, bronze medalist(s)	Denisse Hernández; Nataly Michel; Melissa Rebolledo	Fencing	Women’s Team Foil	2 November
3rd place, bronze medalist(s)	Crisanto Grajales	Triathlon	Men’s Individual	2 November
3rd place, bronze medalist(s)	Rosa María Tapia	Triathlon	Women’s Individual	2 November
3rd place, bronze medalist(s)	Beatriz Briones	Canoeing	Women’s K-1 500m	3 November
3rd place, bronze medalist(s)	Natalia Botello; Diana González; Julieta Toledo	Fencing	Women’s Team Sabre	3 November
3rd place, bronze medalist(s)	Demita Vega	Sailing	Women’s iQFoil	3 November
3rd place, bronze medalist(s)	Emmanuel Benítez	Wrestling	Men's Greco-Roman 77 kg	3 November
3rd place, bronze medalist(s)	Jorge Luna	Athletics	Men's Pole Vault	4 November
3rd place, bronze medalist(s)	Team Mexico	Football	Men’s Tournament	4 November
3rd place, bronze medalist(s)	Dafne Navarro	Gymnastics	Women’s Individual Trampoline	4 November
3rd place, bronze medalist(s)	Mariola García; Dafne Navarro	Gymnastics	Women’s Synchronized Trampoline	4 November
3rd place, bronze medalist(s)	Andrea Becerra; Dafne Quintero	Archery	Women's Team Compound	4 November
3rd place, bronze medalist(s)	Sebastián García; Dafne Quintero	Archery	Mixed Team Compound	4 November
3rd place, bronze medalist(s)	Matías Grande; Alejandra Valencia	Archery	Mixed Team Recurve	5 November
3rd place, bronze medalist(s)	Sandra Góngora	Bowling	Women's Singles	5 November

Medals by Sport
Sport	1st place, gold medalist(s)	2nd place, silver medalist(s)	3rd place, bronze medalist(s)	Total
Diving	8	2	1	11
Basque Pelota	6	2	0	8
Taekwondo	6	1	3	10
Shooting	5	4	0	9
Modern Pentathlon	5	2	0	7
Cycling	3	5	2	10
Racquetball	3	1	5	9
Archery	2	3	3	8
Rowing	2	0	4	6
Canoeing	2	0	1	3
Artistic Swimming	2	0	0	2
Athletics	1	5	2	8
Boxing	1	1	1	3
Karate	1	1	0	2
Triathlon	1	0	2	3
Football	1	0	1	2
Sailing	1	0	1	2
Golf	1	0	0	1
Water Skiing	1	0	0	1
Gymnastics	0	3	4	7
Swimming	0	2	4	6
Judo	0	2	3	5
Roller Sports	0	2	0	2
Squash	0	1	2	3
Weightlifting	0	1	1	2
Badminton	0	0	3	3
Fencing	0	0	3	3
Bowling	0	0	2	2
Baseball	0	0	1	1
Table Tennis	0	0	1	1
Volleyball	0	0	1	1
Wrestling	0	0	1	1
Total	52	38	52	142

== Competitors ==
The following is the list of number of competitors (by gender) who participated at the games per sport.

Sport	Men	Women	Total
Archery	5	7	12
Artistic Swimming	—N/a	9	9
Athletics	22	15	37
Badminton	3	3	6
Baseball	24	—N/a	24
Basketball	16	16	32
Basque Pelota	6	6	12
Bowling	0	2	2
Boxing	6	5	11
Breaking	2	2	4
Canoeing	10	8	18
Cycling	16	12	28
Diving	5	7	12
Equestrian	12	2	14
Fencing	7	9	16
Field Hockey	16	16	32
Football	18	18	36
Golf	2	2	4
Gymnastics	7	15	22
Handball	16	0	16
Judo	7	5	12
Karate	5	3	8
Modern Pentathlon	3	4	7
Racquetball	3	3	6
Roller Sports	4	4	8
Rowing	10	10	20
Rugby Sevens	12	12	24
Sailing	4	5	9
Shooting	11	10	21
Softball	—N/a	16	16
Sport Climbing	4	5	9
Squash	3	3	6
Surfing	3	3	6
Swimming	17	15	32
Table Tennis	3	3	6
Taekwondo	6	6	12
Tennis	2	0	2
Triathlon	3	4	7
Volleyball	14	14	28
Water Polo	13	13	26
Water Skiing	4	2	6
Weightlifting	4	5	9
Wrestling	7	5	12
Total	335	304	639

All basketball, cycling, gymnastics, roller sports, and volleyball disciplines are grouped within each of the sports' totals. Open water swimming is included in Swimming. The total number of athletes reported by the 2023 Pan American Games Organization differs from the total number reported by the Mexican Olympic Committee by 1, for unknown reasons.

== Archery ==
Mexico qualified three athletes (one man and two women) by winning the respective categories in the 2021 Junior Pan American Games. Mexico also qualified eight athletes during the 2022 Pan American Archery Championships.

Men

Athlete	Event	Ranking Round		Round of 32	Round of 16	Quarterfinals	Semifinals	Final / BM	Rank
Athlete	Event	Score	Seed	Opposition Score	Opposition Score	Opposition Score	Opposition Score	Opposition Score	Rank
Matías Grande	Individual recurve	684	3	Palacio (VEN); W 6-2	Betancur (COL); W 7-1	Santiesteban (CUB); W 6-2	Ellison (USA); W 6-4	Mirich (USA); L 4-6	2nd place, silver medalist(s)
Carlos Rojas	Individual recurve	673	7	Castro (EAI); W 6-4	Duenas (CAN); W 6-0	Ellison (USA); L 5-6	Did not advance		=5
Caleb Urbina	Individual recurve	648	25	Arcila (COL); L 3-7	Did not advance				21
Juan del Río	Individual compound	699	12	—N/a	Barillas (EAI); W 146-144	Hernández (ESA); L 144-148	Did not advance		=7
Sebastián García	Individual compound	699	11	—N/a	Sullivan (USA); L 145-147	Did not advance			=9
Matías Grande; Carlos Rojas; Caleb Urbina	Team recurve	2005	3	—N/a		Cuba; W 6-2	Colombia; W 5-3	United States; L 1-5	2nd place, silver medalist(s)
Juan del Río; Sebastián García	Team compound	1398	4	—N/a		Independent Athletes Team; W 159-155	United States; L 157-158	Colombia; L 156-156*	4

Women

Athlete	Event	Ranking Round		Round of 32	Round of 16	Quarterfinals	Semifinals	Final / BM	Rank
Athlete	Event	Score	Seed	Opposition Score	Opposition Score	Opposition Score	Opposition Score	Opposition Score	Rank
Ángela Ruiz	Individual recurve	665	3	Sarduy (CUB); W 6-0	Barrett (CAN); W 6-2	Machado (BRA); L 4-6	Did not advance		=5
Alejandra Valencia	Individual recurve	674	1	Leoni (VEN); W 6-0	Posada (COL); W 6-0	Mucino-Fernandez (USA); W 7-3	Rendón (COL); W 7-1	Machado (BRA); W 7-1	1st place, gold medalist(s)
Valentina Vázquez	Individual recurve	633	12	Abernathy (ISV); W 6-0	Rendón (COL); L 2-6	Did not advance			=9
Andrea Becerra	Individual compound	694	6	—N/a	Paiz (ESA); W 145-142	Usquiano (COL); L 144-146	Did not advance		=6
Ana Hernández	Individual compound	683	12	—N/a	Quintero (MEX); L 145-147	Did not advance			=9
Dafne Quintero	Individual compound	699	5	—N/a	Hernández (MEX); W 147-145	Dean (USA); W 145-142	López (COL); W 149-146	Ruiz (USA); W 147-145	1st place, gold medalist(s)
Aída Román; Ángela Ruiz; Alejandra Valencia	Team recurve	1972	1	—N/a		Venezuela; W 6-0	Brazil; W 6-2	United States; L 1-5	2nd place, silver medalist(s)
Andrea Becerra; Dafne Quintero	Team compound	1393	3	—N/a		Bye	United States; L 151-156	El Salvador; W 158-154	3rd place, bronze medalist(s)

Mixed

Athlete	Event	Ranking Round		Round of 32	Round of 16	Quarterfinals	Semifinals	Final / BM	Rank
Athlete	Event	Score	Seed	Opposition Score	Opposition Score	Opposition Score	Opposition Score	Opposition Score	Rank
Matías Grande; Alejandra Valencia	Team recurve	1358	2	—N/a	El Salvador; W 6-0	Independent Athletes Team; W 5-3	Brazil; L 2-6	Colombia; W 5-3	3rd place, bronze medalist(s)
Sebastián García; Dafne Quintero	Team compound	1398	3	—N/a		El Salvador; W 154-150	Colombia; L 155-156	Brazil; W 155-153	3rd place, bronze medalist(s)

== Artistic swimming ==
Mexico qualified a full team of nine artistic swimmers after winning the competition in the 2022 Central American and Caribbean Games.

Athlete	Event	Technical Routine		Free Routine		Acrobatic routine		Total Points	Final Rank
Athlete	Event	Points	Rank	Points	Rank	Points	Rank	Total Points	Final Rank
Nuria Diosdado; Joana Jiménez	Duet	250.2333	1	235.7875	1	—N/a		486.0208	1st place, gold medalist(s)
Regina Alferez; Marla Arellano; Nuria Diosdado; Daniela Estrada; Itzamary González; Joana Jiménez; Luiza Rubio; Jessica Sobrino; Pamela Toscano	Team	267.5942	1	290.2604	2	228.400	2	786.2546	1st place, gold medalist(s)

== Athletics ==
Key

- Ranks given for track events are overall after all heats are completed
- Q = Qualified for the next round by position
- q = Qualified for the next round by time (track events) or by position if mark was not met (field events)
- DNF = Did not finish
- DSQ = Disqualified
- NM = No mark
- N/A = Time was not published on the results
- PR = Pan American Record

=== Track & Road ===
Men

Athlete	Event	Semifinals		Final	
Athlete	Event	Time	Rank	Time	Rank
César Ramírez	200 m	21.67	15	Did not advance	15
Luis Avilés	400 m	45.84	2 Q	45.97	2nd place, silver medalist(s)
Jesús Tonatiú López	800 m	1:48.65	10 Q	1:46.04	2nd place, silver medalist(s)
Fernando Martínez	1,500 m	—N/a		3:41.77	9
Fernando Martínez	5,000 m	—N/a		DSQ	
Marcelo Lagüera	10,000 m	—N/a		29:29.48	6
Víctor Zambrano	10,000 m	—N/a		30:49.99	11
Guillermo Campos	400 m Hurdles	50.82	4 Q	50.10	6
César Gómez	3,000 m Steeplechase	—N/a		8:47.69	4
Arturo Reyna	3,000 m Steeplechase	—N/a		9:01.06	8
Luis Avilés; Guillermo Campos; Valente Mendoza; Édgar Ramírez	4x400 m Relay	—N/a		3:04.22	2nd place, silver medalist(s)
Patricio Castillo	Marathon	—N/a		2:20:06	8
Hesiquio Flores	Marathon	—N/a		2:26:20	11
José Luis Doctor	20 km Walk	—N/a		1:20:33	6
Andrés Olivas	20 km Walk	—N/a		1:19:56	3rd place, bronze medalist(s)

Women

Athlete	Event	Semifinals		Final	
Athlete	Event	Time	Rank	Time	Rank
Cecilia Tamayo-Garza	100 m	11.66	6 Q	11.75	8
Cecilia Tamayo-Garza	200 m	23.79	5 Q	23.93	6
Luisa Real	800 m	2:08.84	11	Did not advance	11
Anahí Álvarez	1,500 m	—N/a		4:20.52	9
Alma Cortés	1,500 m	—N/a		4:14.44	4
Anahí Álvarez	5,000 m	—N/a		16:20.71	5
Laura Galván	10,000 m	—N/a		33.15.85	2nd place, silver medalist(s)
Arian Chia	3,000 m Steeplechase	—N/a		10:26.36	10
Risper Biyaki	Marathon	—N/a		2:32:13	6
Citlali Cristian	Marathon	—N/a		2:27:12 PR	1st place, gold medalist(s)
Alegna González	20 km Walk	—N/a		DNF	
Alejandra Ortega	20 km Walk	—N/a		N/A	5

Mixed

Athlete	Event	Final	
Athlete	Event	Result	Rank
José Luis Doctor; Alejandra Ortega	Race Walk Mixed Relay	3:15.12	4

Combined Events

Women's Heptathlon

Athlete	Event	100H	HJ	SP	200 m	LJ	JT	800 m	Final	Rank
Lilian Borja	Result	14.19	1.58	11.89	25.50	5.63	39.32	2:18.47	5395	4
Lilian Borja	Points	952	712	654	841	738	654	844	5395	4

=== Field ===
Men

Athlete	Event	Final	
Athlete	Event	Distance	Rank
Erick Portillo	High Jump	2.18	8
Edgar Rivera	High Jump	2.21	4
Jorge Luna	Pole Vault	5.40	3rd place, bronze medalist(s)
Uziel Muñoz	Shot Put	21.15	2nd place, silver medalist(s)
Diego del Real	Hammer Throw	75.63	4
Carlos Armenta	Javelin Throw	69.00	8
David Carreón	Javelin Throw	74.47	5

Women

Athlete	Event	Final	
Athlete	Event	Distance	Rank
Claudina Díaz	High Jump	1.78	4
Alisandra Negrete	Pole Vault	NM	
Alma Pollorena	Discus Throw	50.09	10
Luz Castro	Javelin Throw	56.29	7

== Badminton ==
Mexico qualified a team of six athletes (three men and three women).

Men

Athlete	Event	Round of 64	Round of 32	Round of 16	Quarterfinals	Semifinals	Final / BM	Rank
Athlete	Event	Opposition Result	Opposition Result	Opposition Result	Opposition Result	Opposition Result	Opposition Result	Rank
Job Castillo	Singles	Bye	Canjura (ESA); L 1-2; 19-21, 21-17, 10-21	Did not advance				=17
Luis Ramón Garrido	Singles	Bye	Ricketts (JAM); W 2-0; 21-13, 21-16	Herrera (CUB); W 2-0; 21-12, 21-17	Coelho (BRA); W 2-0; 21-14, 21-15	Cordón (EAI); L 0-2; 17-21, 12-21	Did not advance	3rd place, bronze medalist(s)
Job Castillo; Luis Montoya	Doubles	—N/a		Peru; W 2-0; 21-16, 21-11	Cuba; W 2-0; 21-9, 21-13	Canada; L 1-2; 10-21, 23-21, 23-25	Did not advance	3rd place, bronze medalist(s)

Women

Athlete	Event	Round of 64	Round of 32	Round of 16	Quarterfinals	Semifinals	Final / BM	Rank
Athlete	Event	Opposition Result	Opposition Result	Opposition Result	Opposition Result	Opposition Result	Opposition Result	Rank
Haramara Gaitan	Singles	Bye	Centeno (ESA); W 2-0; 21-13, 21-18	Saponara (PER); W 2-0; 21-9, 22-20	Oropesa (CUB); L 1-2; 14-21, 21-18, 22-24	Did not advance		=5
Romina Fregoso; Miriam Rodríguez	Doubles	—N/a		Brazil; W Walkover	Jamaica; W 2-0; 21-19, 21-16	Canada; L 0-2; 10-21, 10-21, 7-21	Did not advance	3rd place, bronze medalist(s)

Mixed

Athlete	Event	Round of 64	Round of 32	Round of 16	Quarterfinals	Semifinals	Final / BM	Rank
Athlete	Event	Opposition Result	Opposition Result	Opposition Result	Opposition Result	Opposition Result	Opposition Result	Rank
Luis Montoya; Miriam Rodríguez	Doubles	—N/a	Cuba; W 2-0; 21-14, 21-12	Jamaica; W 2-0; 21-15, 21-11	Brazil; L 0-2; 15-21, 21-23	Did not advance		=5
Luis Ramón Garrido; Romina Fregoso	Doubles	—N/a	Colombia; W 2-0; 21-18, 21-8	Canada; W 0-2; 7-21, 11-21	Did not advance			=9

== Baseball ==
Summary

Team	Event	Preliminary Round				Super Round			Final / BM / Pl.	
Team	Event	Opposition Result	Opposition Result	Opposition Result	Rank	Opposition Result	Opposition Result	Rank	Opposition Result	Rank
Mexico	Men's Tournament	Chile; W 16-0	Dominican Republic; W 1-0	Panama; L 2-8	2	Colombia; L 2-10	Brazil; W 5-1	4	Panama; W 10-2	3rd place, bronze medalist(s)

Mexico qualified a men's team (of 24 athletes) by winning the 2023 Central American and Caribbean Games.

Group A

Pos	Team	Pld	W	L	RF	RA	PCT	GB	Qualification
1	Panama	3	3	0	18	3	1.000	—	Super Round
2	Mexico	3	2	1	19	8	.667	1	Super Round
3	Dominican Republic	3	1	2	13	7	.333	2	Fifth place game
4	Chile (H)	3	0	3	2	34	.000	3	Seventh place game

Source: Santiago 2023 and WBSC Americas
(H) Hosts

October 18; 9:30	Mexico	16–0 (F/5)	Chile	Parque Bicentenario de Cerrillos, Cerrillos
October 18; 9:30		Boxscore		Parque Bicentenario de Cerrillos, Cerrillos

October 21; 9:30	Dominican Republic	0–1	Mexico	Parque Bicentenario de Cerrillos, Cerrillos
October 21; 9:30		Boxscore		Parque Bicentenario de Cerrillos, Cerrillos

October 23; 9:30	Panama	8–2	Mexico	Parque Bicentenario de Cerrillos, Cerrillos
October 23; 9:30		Boxscore		Parque Bicentenario de Cerrillos, Cerrillos

Super Round

Pos	Team	Pld	W	L	RF	RA	PCT	GB	Qualification
1	Brazil	3	2	1	14	15	.667	—	Gold medal game
2	Colombia	3	2	1	19	11	.667	—	Gold medal game
3	Panama	3	1	2	12	9	.333	1	Bronze medal game
4	Mexico	3	1	2	9	19	.333	1	Bronze medal game

Source: Santiago 2023 and WBSC Americas

October 26; 9:30	Mexico	2–10	Colombia	Parque Bicentenario de Cerrillos, Cerrillos
October 26; 9:30		Boxscore		Parque Bicentenario de Cerrillos, Cerrillos

October 27; 15:00	Mexico	5–1	Brazil	Parque Bicentenario de Cerrillos, Cerrillos
October 27; 15:00		Boxscore		Parque Bicentenario de Cerrillos, Cerrillos

Bronze Medal Game

October 28; 9:30	Mexico	10–2	Panama	Parque Bicentenario de Cerrillos, Cerrillos
October 28; 9:30		Boxscore		Parque Bicentenario de Cerrillos, Cerrillos

== Basketball ==
Mexico qualified a men's team (of 12 athletes) by finishing fifth in the 2022 FIBA Americup. The women's team entered once the United States and Canada, second and third at the 2023 FIBA Women's AmeriCup, withdrew from the tournament.

=== 5x5 ===
Men

Summary

Team	Event	Group stage				Semifinal	Final / BM / Pl.	
Team	Event	Opposition Result	Opposition Result	Opposition Result	Rank	Opposition Result	Opposition Result	Rank
Mexico	Men's tournament	Brazil; L 54-74	Puerto Rico; W 82-72	Chile; L 59-63	2	Argentina; L 73-108	Brazil; L 61-73	4

Preliminary Round

Pos	Team	Pld	W	L	PF	PA	PD	Pts	Qualification
1	Brazil	3	3	0	240	166	+74	6	Semifinals
2	Mexico	3	1	2	195	209	−14	4 (Note: Head to head record: Mexico 1−1 (+6), Chile 1−1 (0), Puerto Rico 1−1 (−6))	Semifinals
3	Chile (H)	3	1	2	172	223	−51	4	Fifth place game
4	Puerto Rico	3	1	2	211	220	−9	4	Seventh place game

Source: Santiago 2023
(H) Hosts
Notes:

31 October 2023
17:30

Boxscore

Mexico	54–74	Brazil
Scoring by quarter: 10–19, 13–23, 13–18, 18–14
Pts: Valdés, Jaimes 9 Rebs: Camacho 5 Asts: Andriassi 3		Pts: Crepaldi 14; Rebs: Louzada, Crepaldi 6 Asts: Corazza 4

Multisport Complex 1, Santiago
Referees: Gastón Maina (URU), Daniel Nieves (VEN), Kevin Lei (CAN)

1 November 2023
17:30

Boxscore

Puerto Rico	72–82	Mexico
Scoring by quarter: 12–25, 24–20, 21–13, 15–24
Pts: Cruz 23; Rebs: Medina 7 Asts: Boyd 5		Pts: Montano 24; Rebs: Ávalos 8 Asts: Ávalos 5

Multisport Complex 1, Santiago
Referees: Leonardo Zalazar (ARG), Kristian Páez (ECU), Michael Scott (CAN)

2 November 2023
20:00

Boxscore

Chile	63–59	Mexico
Scoring by quarter: 14–11, 16–17, 21–22, 12–9
Pts: Carvacho 16; Rebs: Carvacho 12; Asts: Morales 8		Pts: Gutiérrez 19; Rebs: Gutiérrez 13; Asts: de Haro 4

Multisport Complex 1, Santiago
Referees: Michael Scott (CAN), Orlando Varela (HON), Franco Anselmo (ARG)

Knockout Round (Semifinal)

3 November 2023
17:30

Boxscore

Argentina	108–73	Mexico
Scoring by quarter: 25–26, 32–13, 26–24, 25–10
Pts: Baralle 13; Rebs: Ramírez 8 Asts: Baralle, Scala 5		Pts: Andriassi 15; Rebs: de Haro 5 Asts: Machado 4

Multisport Complex 1, Santiago
Referees: Jorge Vásquez (PUR), Julio Anaya (PAN), Kevin Lei (CAN)

Bronze Medal Game

4 November 2023
17:00

Boxscore

Mexico	61–73	Brazil
Scoring by quarter: 10–21, 13–18, 17–17, 21–17
Pts: Montano 16; Rebs: Jaimes 8 Asts: Montano 4		Pts: Camilo 18; Rebs: Crepaldi 10; Asts: Dias 5

Multisport Complex 1, Santiago
Referees: Jorge Vásquez (PUR), Leonardo Zalazar (ARG), Johnny Batista (PUR)

Women

Team	Event	Group stage				Semifinal	Final / BM / Pl.	
Team	Event	Opposition Result	Opposition Result	Opposition Result	Rank	Opposition Result	Opposition Result	Rank
Mexico	Women's Tournament	Brazil; L 54-72	Colombia; L 54–66	Venezuela; L 65–71	4	Did not advance	Puerto Rico; L 70–75; 7th place game	8

Preliminary Round

Pos	Team	Pld	W	L	PF	PA	PD	Pts	Qualification
1	Brazil	3	3	0	244	158	+86	6	Semifinals
2	Colombia	3	2	1	196	189	+7	5	Semifinals
3	Venezuela	3	1	2	175	232	−57	4	Fifth place game
4	Mexico	3	0	3	173	209	−36	3	Seventh place game

Source: Santiago 2023

25 October 2023
10:30

Boxscore

Brazil	72–54	Mexico
Scoring by quarter: 16–12, 19–16, 21–14, 16–12
Pts: Fausto, Lopes 12; Rebs: de Souza 13; Asts: de Oliveira 4		Pts: Ávila, Luna 9 Rebs: Luna 8 Asts: Ramírez 3

Multisport Complex 1, Santiago
Referees: Roberto Vásquez (PUR), Kristian Páez (ECU), Micaela Prado (ARG)

26 October 2023
13:00

Boxscore

Mexico	54–66	Colombia
Scoring by quarter: 16–18, 12–12, 16–18, 10–18
Pts: Luna 13; Rebs: Luna 9 Asts: Beltrán 4		Pts: Muñoz 26; Rebs: Paz 8 Asts: Ríos 5

Multisport Complex 1, Santiago
Referees: Andrés Bartel (URU), Carmelo de la Rosa (PUR), Felipe Ibarra (CHI)

27 October 2023
13:00

Boxscore

Venezuela	71–65	Mexico
Scoring by quarter: 24–15, 8–16, 14–17, 25–17
Pts: Durán 22; Rebs: Fajardo 16; Asts: Durán, Pérez 6		Pts: Ramírez 13; Rebs: Lara 7 Asts: Ramírez 5

Multisport Complex 1, Santiago
Referees: Leonardo Zalazar (ARG), Felipe Ibarra (CHI), Carmelo de la Rosa (PUR)

Placement Games (7th-8th Place)

28 October 2023
10:30

Boxscore

Puerto Rico	75–70	Mexico
Scoring by quarter: 13–22, 17–17, 22–19, 23–12
Pts: Rosado 21; Rebs: Roma 8 Asts: Rosado 4		Pts: Lara 17; Rebs: Ramos 7 Asts: Ramírez 4

Multisport Complex 1, Santiago
Referees: Leonardo Zalazar (ARG), Tiago dos Santos (BRA), Orlando Varela (HON)

=== 3x3 ===
Men

Mexico qualified a men's team (of 4 athletes) by finishing as one of the six best non qualified teams in the FIBA 3x3 Rankings.

Summary

Team	Event	Preliminary round			Quarterfinal	Semifinal	Final / BM / Pl.	
Team	Event	Opposition Result	Opposition Result	Rank	Opposition Result	Opposition Result	Opposition Result	Rank
Mexico	Men's tournament	El Salvador; W 22–12	United States; L 18–21	2 Q	Chile; L 15–21	Did not advance		7

Preliminary Round

Pos	Team	Pld	W	L	PF	PA	PD	Qualification
1	United States	2	2	0	43	26	+17	Quarterfinals
2	Mexico	2	1	1	40	33	+7	Quarterfinals
3	El Salvador	2	0	2	20	44	−24	

Source: Report
Rules for classification: 1) Wins; 2) Head-to-head record; 3) Points scored.

21 October 2023
15:30

Report

Mexico	22–12	El Salvador
Pts: Ruiz 11		Pts: three players 4

Estadio Español
Referees: Jorge García (MEX) / María Olivieri (ARG)

22 October 2023
15:00

Report

United States	21–18	Mexico
Pts: Fredette 11		Pts: Zesati 8

Estadio Español
Referees: Lautaro Ojeda (ARG) / Sonia Maldonado (PUR)

Knockout Round (Quarterfinal)

22 October 2023
20:30

Report

Chile	21–15	Mexico
Pts: Lauler 8		Pts: Zesati 10

Estadio Español
Referees: Jorge Garcia (DOM) / Sonia Maldonado (PUR)

Women

Mexico qualified a women's team (of 4 athletes) by finishing as one of the six best non qualified teams in the FIBA 3x3 Rankings.

Summary

Team	Event	Preliminary round			Quarterfinal	Semifinal	Final / BM / Pl.	
Team	Event	Opposition Result	Opposition Result	Rank	Opposition Result	Opposition Result	Opposition Result	Rank
Mexico	Women's tournament	Dominican Republic; W 19–12	United States; L 9–22	2 Q	Puerto Rico; L 16–20	Did not advance		7

Preliminary Round

Pos	Team	Pld	W	L	PF	PA	PD	Qualification
1	United States	2	2	0	43	20	+23	Quarterfinals
2	Mexico	2	1	1	28	33	−5	Quarterfinals
3	Dominican Republic	2	0	2	23	41	−18	

Source: Report
Rules for classification: 1) Wins; 2) Head-to-head record; 3) Points scored.

21 October 2023
14:00

Report

Mexico	19–12	Dominican Republic
Pts: Esquer, Rovira 7		Pts: Polanco 6

Estadio Español Las Condes, Santiago
Referees: Lautaro Ojeda (ARG), Yilizeth Vence (COL)

22 October 2023
13:00

Report

United States	22–9	Mexico
Pts: Stevens 7		Pts: Rovira 4

Estadio Español Las Condes, Santiago
Referees: Marie Houlie (CAN), Ana Zachi (BRA)

Knockout Round (Quarterfinal)

22 October 2023
18:30

Report

Puerto Rico	20–16	Mexico
Pts: Vargas 8		Pts: Rovira 7

Estadio Español Las Condes, Santiago
Referees: María Olivieri (ARG), Jorge García (DOM)

== Basque pelota ==
Mexico qualified a team of 12 athletes (six men and six women) through the 2022 Basque Pelota World Championship and the 2023 Pan American Basque Pelota Tournament.

Men

Athlete	Event	Preliminary round					Semifinal	Final / BM	Rank
Athlete	Event	Match 1	Match 2	Match 3	Match 4	Rank	Semifinal	Final / BM	Rank
Athlete	Event	Opposition Score	Opposition Score	Opposition Score	Opposition Score	Rank	Opposition Score	Opposition Score	Rank
Isaac Pérez	Individual Fronton; Rubber Ball	Fernández (ARG); W 2-0; 15-11, 15-5	Miranda (BOL); W Walkover	Fernández (CUB); W 2-0; 15-4, 15-6	Bolelli (CHI); W 2-0; 15-3, 15-6	1 QG	-	Fernández (ARG); W 2-0; 15-14, 15-13	1st place, gold medalist(s)
Daniel García; Arturo Rodríguez	Trinquet Doubles; Rubber Ball	Argentina; L 0-2; 7-15, 9-15	Peru; W 2-0; 15-4, 15-7	Chile; W 2-1; 15-7, 13-15, 10-7	Uruguay; W 2-0; 15-5, 15-11	2 QG	-	Argentina; L 0-2; 8-15, 2-15	2nd place, silver medalist(s)
Isaac Cruz; Jorge Olvera	Doubles Frontenis	United States; W 2-0; 15-5, 15-3	Chile; W 2-0; 15-5, 15-1	Peru; W 2-0; 15-3, 15-6	Argentina; W 2-0; 15-2, 15-3	1 QG	-	United States; W 2-0; 15-5, 15-7	1st place, gold medalist(s)
David Álvarez	Frontball	Airala (URU); W 2-0; 12-2, 12-1	Fouilloux (CHI); W 2-0; 12-4, 12-5	Comas (ARG); W 2-0; 12-2, 12-5	—N/a	2	Otheguy (BRA); W 2-0; 12-6, 12-4	Abréu (CUB); W 2-0; 12-5, 12-0	1st place, gold medalist(s)

Women

Athlete	Event	Preliminary round					Semifinal	Final / BM	Rank
Athlete	Event	Match 1	Match 2	Match 3	Match 4	Rank	Semifinal	Final / BM	Rank
Athlete	Event	Opposition Score	Opposition Score	Opposition Score	Opposition Score	Rank	Opposition Score	Opposition Score	Rank
Marifer Noriega	Individual Fronton; Rubber Ball	Álvarez (CUB); W 2-0; 15-7, 15-5	Valderrama (CHI); W 2-1; 14-15, 15-5, 10-5	Morell (URU); W 2-0; 15-1, 15-2	Andrade (ARG); W 2-1; 15-11, 7-15, 10-9	1 QG	-	Andrade (ARG); W 2-0; 15-14, 15-8	1st place, gold medalist(s)
Dulce Figueroa; Laura Puentes	Trinquet Doubles; Rubber Ball	Argentina; L 0-2; 13-15, 10-15	Venezuela; W 2-0; 15-1, 15-4	Chile; W 2-0; 15-11, 15-1	Uruguay; W 2-0; 15-7, 15-5	2 QG	-	Argentina; L 0-2; 10-15, 10-15	2nd place, silver medalist(s)
Ariana Cepeda; Ximena Placito	Doubles Frontenis	Cuba; W 2-0; 15-10, 15-6	Peru; W 2-0; 15-6, 15-7	Chile; W 2-0; 15-6, 15-0	Venezuela; W 2-0; 15-4, 15-2	1 QG	-	Cuba; W 2-0; 15-6, 15-8	1st place, gold medalist(s)
Itzel Reyes	Frontball	Araya (CRC); W 2-0; 12-1, 12-1	Cortez (ARG); W 2-0; 12-9, 12-1	Sola (CHI); W 2-0; 12-6, 12-6	—N/a	1	Leoncio (CUB); W 2-0; 12-0, 12-2	Acosta (URU); W 2-0; 12-4, 12-3	1st place, gold medalist(s)

QG=Qualified for Gold Medal Match.

== Bowling ==
Mexico qualified a team of two women through the 2022 PABCON Champion of Champions held in Rio de Janeiro, Brazil.

Athlete	Event	Ranking Round																		Semifinal	Final	
Athlete	Event	Day 1								Day 2								Total	Rank	Semifinal	Final	
Athlete	Event	1	2	3	4	5	6	7	8	9	10	11	12	13	14	15	16	Total	Rank	Opposition Result	Opposition Result	Rank
Sandra Góngora	Women's singles	192	235	165	245	180	207	237	213	192	171	234	247	211	174	224	207	3334	2 Q	Franco (COL); L 605-655	Did not advance	3rd place, bronze medalist(s)
Iliana Lomelí	Women's singles	199	192	176	237	253	194	192	168	224	235	195	229	164	190	136	155	3139	7	Did not advance		7

Athlete	Event	Final									
Athlete	Event	Scores								Total	Rank
Athlete	Event	1	2	3	4	5	6	7	8	Total	Rank
Sandra Góngora; Iliana Lomelí	Women's Doubles	202; 164	170; 194	180; 253	190; 212	185; 202	180; 166	195; 215	193; 181	3082	3rd place, bronze medalist(s)

== Boxing ==
Mexico qualified 11 boxers (six men and five women).

Men

Athlete	Event	Round of 32	Round of 16	Quarterfinals	Semifinals	Final	Rank
Athlete	Event	Opposition Result	Opposition Result	Opposition Result	Opposition Result	Opposition Result	Rank
Óscar Castañeda	–51 kg	—N/a	Bye	Alcántara (DOM); L 0–3	Did not advance		=5
Miguel Vega	–57 kg	—N/a	Horta (CUB); L 0–5	Did not advance			=9
Miguel Martínez	–63.5 kg	Bye	Williams (JAM); W RSC	Viáfara (COL); W 3-2	de la Cruz (DOM); W 3-2	Sanford (CAN); L 0-5	2nd place, silver medalist(s)
Marco Verde	–71 kg	—N/a	Cuéllar (CUB); W 5-0	Jones (USA); W 5-0	Beckford (PAN); W 5-0	Rodríguez (ECU); W 5-0	1st place, gold medalist(s)
Rogelio Romero	–92 kg	—N/a	Bye	Castillo (ECU); L 0-5	Did not advance		=5
Javier Cruz	+92 kg	—N/a	Bye	Teixeira (BRA); L 0-5	Did not advance		=5

Women

Athlete	Event	Round of 32	Round of 16	Quarterfinals	Semifinals	Final	Rank
Athlete	Event	Opposition Result	Opposition Result	Opposition Result	Opposition Result	Opposition Result	Rank
Ingrid Gómez	–50 kg	—N/a	López (ARG); L 0-5	Did not advance			=9
Gloria Fernández	–54 kg	—N/a	Bye	Arias (COL); L 1-4	Did not advance		=5
Jennifer Carrillo	–57 kg	—N/a	Calá (CUB); L 1-4	Did not advance			=9
Esmeralda Falcón	–60 kg	—N/a	Ferreira (BRA); L 0-5	Did not advance			=9
Citlalli Ortíz	–75 kg	—N/a	Estornell (CUB); W 5–0	Graham (USA); W 5–0	Thibeault (CAN); L 0-5	Did not advance	3rd place, bronze medalist(s)

== Breaking ==
Men

Athlete	Event	Round Robin				Quarterfinals	Semifinals	Final / BM	Rank
Athlete	Event	Opposition Result	Opposition Result	Opposition Result	Rank	Opposition Result	Opposition Result	Opposition Result	Rank
Brandon Valencia ("Kastrito")	B-Boys	Dux-M (DOM); T 1-1	Jeffro (USA); L 0-2	Alvin (COL); L 0-2	4	Did not advance			13
Luis Deolarte ("Ninonino")	B-Boys	Broly (ARG); T 1-1	Gravity (USA); L 0-2	Rato (BRA); L 0-2	4	Did not advance			14

Women

Athlete	Event	Round Robin				Quarterfinals	Semifinals	Final / BM	Rank
Athlete	Event	Opposition Result	Opposition Result	Opposition Result	Rank	Opposition Result	Opposition Result	Opposition Result	Rank
Gloria Reyes ("Xunli")	B-Girls	Vale Chica (CHI); L 0-2	Luma (COL); L 0-2	Isis (ECU); L 0-2	4	Did not advance			16
Swami Mostalac ("Swami")	B-Girls	La Vix (USA); L 0-2	Abril (ARG); W 2-0	Monchi (PER); W 2-0	2	Sunny (USA); L 0-2	Did not advance		8

== Canoeing ==
=== Slalom ===
Mexico qualified five slalom athletes (three men and two women).

Athlete	Event	Time Trial		Heats				Semifinal		Final	
Athlete	Event	Time	Rank	1st Ride	2nd Ride	Best Time	Rank	Time	Rank	Time	Rank
Ricardo Fentanes	Men's C-1	—N/a		DSQ	99.96	99.96	6	269.46	7	Did not advance	7
Antonio Reinoso	Men's K-1	—N/a		81.73	86.02	81.73	6	103.51	5	104.50	5
Antonio Reinoso	Men's Kayak Cross	54.70	12 Q	—N/a				N/A	2 Q	N/A	4
Fernando Reinoso	Men's Kayak Cross	61.61	14	—N/a				Did not advance			14
Sofía Reinoso	Women's K-1	—N/a		95.10	100.31	95.10	4	121.42	4	127.71	4
María Ayón	Women's Kayak Cross	100.58	17	—N/a				Did not advance			17
Sofía Reinoso	Women's Kayak Cross	59.58	10	—N/a				N/A	4	Did not advance	=5

Rank indicates position after each round. For kayak cross, the top 8 during the time trial advanced to the semifinal though only one athlete per country could advance.

=== Sprint ===
Mexico qualified a total of 13 sprint athletes (seven men and six women).

Men

Athlete	Event	Heat		Semifinal		Final	
Athlete	Event	Time	Rank	Time	Rank	Time	Rank
Rigoberto Camilo	C-1 1000 m	4:24.56	4 S	4:07.38	4 F	4:00.10	5
Rigoberto Camilo; Gustavo Eslava	C-2 500 m	—N/a				1:45.00	5
Daniel Ledesma	K-1 1000 m	3:49.68	3 S	3:50.39	1 F	3:41.68	5
Alberto Briones; Juan Rodríguez	K-2 500 m	1:35.76	4 S	1:38.66	2 F	1:35.71	7
Alberto Briones; José Roberto Eguía; Carlos Navarro; Juan Rodríguez	K-4 500 m	—N/a				1:27.50	6

Women

Athlete	Event	Heat		Semifinal		Final	
Athlete	Event	Time	Rank	Time	Rank	Time	Rank
Nicol Guzmán	C-1 200 m	51.17	4 S	53.63	4 F	49.31	8
Beatriz Briones	K-1 500 m	1:56.06	1 F	Bye		1:53.07	3rd place, bronze medalist(s)
Isabel Aburto	K-1 500 m	2:06.03	6 S	2:02.58	2 F	2:01.01	7
Beatriz Briones; Karina Alanís	K-2 500 m	1:45.86	2 F	Bye		1:41.98	1st place, gold medalist(s)
Karina Alanís; Beatriz Briones; Brenda Gutiérrez; Maricela Montemayor	K-4 500 m	—N/a				1:34.73	1st place, gold medalist(s)

Rank indicates position after each round. F = Qualified directly to the final; S = Qualified for the semifinal.

== Cycling ==
Mexico qualified a total of 27 cyclists (12 men and 15 women).

=== BMX ===
Freestyle

Athlete	Event	Qualification				Final			Rank
Athlete	Event	Run 1	Run 2	Average	Rank	Run 1	Run 2	Best	Rank
Kevin Peraza	Men	73.67	74.67	74.17	6 Q	47.67	80.00	80.00	5
Sofía Báez	Women	39.33	36.33	37.83	5	Did not advance			5

=== Mountain biking ===
Mexico qualified 4 athletes at the 2023 Pan American Championships.

Athlete	Event	Time	Rank
Adair Gutiérrez	Men's Cross-Country	1:21:10	6
Amando Martínez	Men's Cross-Country	1:25:45	12
Daniela Campuzano	Women's Cross-Country	DNF	
Erika Rodríguez	Women's Cross-Country	LAP	

=== Road ===
Mexico qualified one female athlete by winning the event in the 2021 Junior Pan American Games. Mexico also qualified two female athletes at the 2023 Pan American Championships.

Men

Athlete	Event	Time	Rank
Tomás Aguirre	Road Race	DNF	
Ulises Castillo	Road Race	3:48.07	22
Fernando Nava	Road Race	DNS	
Ricardo Peña	Road Race	DNF	

Women

Athlete	Event	Time	Rank
Yareli Acevedo	Road Race	2:58.59	20
Marcela Prieto	Road Race	2:53.37	10
Andrea Ramírez	Road Race	2:53.36	9
Lizbeth Salazar	Road Race	3:00.23	22
Marcela Prieto	Time Trial	28:35.93	15
Andrea Ramírez	Time Trial	28:06.95	9

=== Track ===
Mexico qualified a team of 18 track cyclists (nine men and nine women).

Sprint

Athlete	Event	Qualification		Round of 16	Repechage	Quarterfinals	Semifinals	Final/BM	
Athlete	Event	Time Speed (km/h)	Rank	Opposition Time Speed (km/h)	Opposition Time Speed (km/h)	Opposition Time Speed (km/h)	Opposition Time Speed (km/h)	Opposition Time Speed (km/h)	Rank
Juan Carlos Ruiz	Men's Individual	10.108 (71.230)	10 Q	Paul (TTO); L	Verdugo (MEX); Vilar (ARG); L	Did not advance			12
Edgar Verdugo	Men's Individual	9.981 (72.137)	9 Q	Puerta (COL); L	Ruiz (MEX); Vilar (ARG); W 10.645 (67.637)	Wammes (CAN); L L	Did not advance		8
Jessica Salazar	Women's Individual	11.192 (64.331)	6 Q	Salazar (COL); W 11.751 (61.271)	Bye	Verdugo (MEX); L L	Did not advance		5
Yuli Verdugo	Women's Individual	10.965 (65.663)	3 Q	Vera (ARG); W 11.292 (63.761)	Bye	Salazar (MEX); W 11.483 (62.701); W 11.357 (63.397)	Barbosa (BRA); W 11.460 (62.827); W 11.351 (63.430)	Bayona (COL); L L	2nd place, silver medalist(s)
Jafet López; Juan Carlos Ruiz; Edgar Verdugo	Men's Team	44.569 (60.850)	3 QB	—N/a				United States; W 44.037 (61.312)	3rd place, bronze medalist(s)
Daniela Gaxiola; Jessica Salazar; Yuli Verdugo	Women's Team	47.960 (56.296)	1 QG	—N/a				United States; W 47.134 (57.283)	1st place, gold medalist(s)

Time and speed for direct elimination rounds were not made available for the losing athletes; QG = Qualified for Gold Medal; QB = Qualified for Bronze.

Pursuit

Athlete	Event	Qualification		Round 1		Final	
Athlete	Event	Time Speed (km/h)	Rank	Opposition Time Speed (km/h)	Rank	Opposition Time Speed (km/h)	Rank
Tomás Aguirre; Ulises Castillo; Edibaldo Maldonado; Sebastián Ruiz	Men's Team	4:08.914 (57.851)	5	Chile; W 3:57.842 (58.076)	3 QB	United States; L 4:00.554 (59.886)	4
Yareli Acevedo; Antonieta Gaxiola; Lizbeth Salazar; Victoria Velasco	Women's Team	4:30.520 (53.230)	2	Colombia; W 4:24.386 (54.465)	2 QG	Canada; L OVL	2nd place, silver medalist(s)

In team pursuit, the winners of heats 1-2 in Round 1 proceed for gold while the next 2 fastest go for bronze; QG = Qualified for Gold Medal; QB = Qualified for Bronze.

Keirin

Athlete	Event	Round 1		Final/BM	
Athlete	Event	Time Speed (km/h)	Rank	Time Speed (km/h)	Rank
Juan Carlos Ruiz	Men's	N/A	3 QG	N/A	3rd place, bronze medalist(s)
Daniela Gaxiola	Women's	11.583 (62.160)	1 QG	11.221 (65.765)	2nd place, silver medalist(s)

Round 1 rank indicates position within each heat. QG= Qualified for Gold; N/A= Times not available in the official results.

Madison

Athlete	Event	Sprints																				Lap Points	Total Points	Rank
Athlete	Event	1	2	3	4	5	6	7	8	9	10	11	12	13	14	15	16	17	18	19	20	Lap Points	Total Points	Rank
Fernando Nava; Ricardo Peña	Men's	0	2	0	5	5	5	5	3	5	0	5	3	1	3	5	5	5	2	5	6	20	90	1st place, gold medalist(s)
Antonieta Gaxiola; Lizbeth Salazar	Women's	1	3	3	5	5	5	3	5	0	3	3	6	-								0	42	2nd place, silver medalist(s)

Omnium

Athlete	Event	Scratch		Tempo Race		Elimination		Points Race		Total Points	Rank
Athlete	Event	Rank	Points	Rank	Points	Rank	Points	Rank	Points	Total Points	Rank
Ricardo Peña	Men's	7	28	2	38	4	34	1	24	124	2nd place, silver medalist(s)
Yareli Acevedo	Women's	4	34	4	34	1	40	3	20	128	1st place, gold medalist(s)

== Diving ==
Mexico qualified four athletes (two men and two women) by winning the respective events in the 2021 Junior Pan American Games. Mexico also qualified three other athletes (one man and two women) by finishing among the top 18 athletes of the respective events in the 2022 World Aquatics Championships.

Men

Athlete	Event	Qualification		Final	
Athlete	Event	Points	Rank	Points	Rank
Rodrigo Diego	1m Springboard	314.10	15	Did not advance	15
Rodrigo Diego	3m Springboard	433.60	2 Q	378.25	9
Osmar Olvera	1m Springboard	366.00	3 Q	424.70	1st place, gold medalist(s)
Osmar Olvera	3m Springboard	461.10	1 Q	536.15	1st place, gold medalist(s)
Rodrigo Diego; Osmar Olvera	Synchronized 3m Springboard	—N/a		409.29	1st place, gold medalist(s)
Randal Willars	10m Platform	466.45	1 Q	479.40	1st place, gold medalist(s)
Kenny Zamudio	10m Platform	430.50	2 Q	451.60	3rd place, bronze medalist(s)
Kevin Berlín; Randal Willars	Synchronized 10m Platform	—N/a		419.94	1st place, gold medalist(s)

Women

Athlete	Event	Qualification		Final	
Athlete	Event	Points	Rank	Points	Rank
Arantxa Chávez	1m Springboard	267.10	2 Q	258.85	4
Arantxa Chávez	3m Springboard	329.25	2 Q	336.85	2nd place, silver medalist(s)
Carolina Mendoza	1m Springboard	226.35	8 Q	236.50	8
Carolina Mendoza	3m Springboard	232.95	13	Did not advance	13
Frida Zúñiga	3m Springboard	246.15	9 Q	244.70	9
Arantxa Chávez; Paola Pineda	Synchronized 3m Springboard	—N/a		285.48	1st place, gold medalist(s)
Gabriela Agúndez	10m Platform	333.75	2 Q	361.55	1st place, gold medalist(s)
Alejandra Estudillo	10m Platform	311.60	6*	Did not advance	13
Alejandra Orozco	10m Platform	320.10	3 Q	340.80	2nd place, silver medalist(s)
Gabriela Agúndez; Alejandra Orozco	Synchronized 10m Platform	—N/a		315.42	1st place, gold medalist(s)

* Alejandra Estudillo was excluded from the 10m platform final as only two divers per country could qualify.

== Equestrian ==
Mexico qualified a full team of four riders in dressage, eventing and show-jumping based on FEI world rankings released on September 11, 2023.

=== Dressage ===
Athlete	Horse	Event	Prix St.-Georges Grand Prix		Intermediate I Grand Prix Special		Intermediate I Freestyle Grand Prix Freestyle		Total Score	Final Rank
Athlete	Horse	Event	Score	Rank	Score	Rank	Technical	Artistic	Total Score	Final Rank
Carolina Cordoba	Johnny Cash	Individual	69.059	14	68.441	21	68.250	73.640	70.945	17
Carlos Maldonado	Frans	Individual	67.823	18	66.971	25	62.650	65.160	63.905	19
Marcos Ortiz	Gentil	Individual	66.000	27	62.447	34	Did not advance			32
María Ugryumova	Impaciente PH	Individual	64.978	32	67.596	22	66.050	73.080	72.565	14
Carolina Cordoba; Carlos Maldonado; Marcos Ortiz; María Ugryumova	See above	Team	69.059; 67.823; 66.000; ~~64.978~~	5	68.441; 66.971; ~~62.447~~; 67.596	6	—N/a		405.890	6

For the individual competition, the top 15 advanced to the Intermediate I Freestyle (max of 3 per country) and the final score was the average of the technical and artistic scores. For the team competition, the lowest scores were deleted from the final calculations. Irvin Leiva was the reserve and did not compete.

=== Eventing ===
Athlete	Horse	Event	Dressage		Cross-country		Jumping		Total	Final Rank
Athlete	Horse	Event	Points	Rank	Penalties	Rank	Penalties	Rank	Total	Final Rank
José Mercado	Balanca SDN	Individual	46.4	29	81.6	25	11.2	25	139.2	25
Fernando Parroquín	Anáhuac SDN	Individual	32.9	9	26.4	14	5.2	13	64.5	13
Eduardo Rivero	Bimori SDN	Individual	39.9	19	22.8	16	26	17	88.7	17
Luis Santiago	Egipcio II	Individual	36.4	13	50.6	22	12.8	18	99.8	18
José Mercado; Fernando Parroquín; Eduardo Rivero; Luis Santiago	See above	Team	~~46.4~~; 32.9; 39.9; 36.4	4	~~128~~; 59.3; 62.7; 87	5	~~11.2~~; 5.2; 26.0; 12.8	4	253.0	4

For the individual competition, cross-country and jumping took into consideration penalties and also time for the rank. For the team competition, the scores of the competitor with the highest number after dressage and cross-country were deleted from the final calculations.

=== Jumping ===
Athlete	Horse	Event	Qualification						Final				Total	Rank
Athlete	Horse	Event	1st Q		2nd Q-R1		2nd Q-R2		3rd Q-RA		3rd Q-RB		Total	Rank
Athlete	Horse	Event	Faults	Q1	Faults	Q2-R1	Faults	Q2-R2	Faults	Q3-RA	Faults	Q3-RB	Total	Rank
José Antonio Chedraui	H-Lucky Retto	Individual	16	11.12	0	0	4	4	Did not advance				15.12	31
Federico Fernández	Romeo	Individual	0	7.33	8	8	8	8	Did not advance				23.33	33
Eugenio Garza	Contago	Individual	0	1.63	4	4	0	0	4	4	12	12	21.63	11
Nicolás Pizarro	Pia Contra	Individual	4	5.62	0	0	0	0	16	16	ABST	—N/a	20.62	20
José Antonio Chedraui; Federico Fernández; Eugenio Garza; Nicolás Pizarro	See above	Team	~~11.2~~; 7.33; 1.63; 5.62	14.58	0; ~~8~~; 4; 0	4	4; ~~8~~; 0; 0	4	—N/a				22.58	4

For the team competition, the highest scores were deleted from the final calculations. Andrés Azcárraga was the reserve and did not compete.

== Fencing ==
Mexico qualified a team of 16 fencers (seven men and nine women), after five of six teams (except the men's épée) finished at least in the top seven at the 2022 Pan American Fencing Championships in Ascuncion, Paraguay. Mexico also qualified one male individual in the épée event.

Individual

Men

Athlete	Event	Pool Round		Round of 16	Quarterfinals	Semifinals	Final	
Athlete	Event	Victories	Seed	Opposition Score	Opposition Score	Opposition Score	Opposition Score	Rank
Pablo Florido	Épée	0	19	Did not advance				19
Tommaso Archilei	Foil	3	8 Q	Schrembi (ISV); W 15-9	Itkin (USA); L 7-15	Did not advance		7
Diego Cervantes	Foil	3	7 Q	Liu (CAN); W 15-5	Toldo (USA); L 11-15	Did not advance		6
Brandon Romo	Sabre	1	16 Q	Arfa (CAN); L 8-15	Did not advance			15
Gibrán Zea	Sabre	3	9 Q	Di Tella (ARG); L 13-15	Did not advance			11

Women

Athlete	Event	Pool Round		Round of 16	Quarterfinals	Semifinals	Final	
Athlete	Event	Victories	Seed	Opposition Score	Opposition Score	Opposition Score	Opposition Score	Rank
María Fernanda Morales	Épée	4	4 Q	Tejeda (MEX); W 15-14	Fernández (CHI); L 12-15	Did not advance		7
Frania Tejeda	Épée	2	13 Q	Morales (MEX); L 14-15	Did not advance			13
Denisse Hernández	Foil	3	8 Q	Rosales (PER); W 12-11	Harvey (CAN); L 6-11	Did not advance		8
Nataly Michel	Foil	3	7 Q	Proestakis (CHI); W 15-9	Kiefer (USA); L 8-15	Did not advance		7
Natalia Botello	Sabre	3	9 Q	Morales (COL); W 15-13	Chamberlain (USA); L 8-15	Did not advance		8
Julieta Toledo	Sabre	3	4 Q	Trois (BRA); W 15-5	Muñoz (CHI); W 15-14	Chamberlain (USA); L 7-15	Did not advance	3rd place, bronze medalist(s)

Team

Athlete	Event	Quarterfinals	Semifinals/Consolation	Final / BM / PM	
Athlete	Event	Opposition Score	Opposition Score	Opposition Score	Rank
Tommaso Archilei; Diego Cervantes; Brandon Romo; Ulises Soto	Men's Foil	Brazil; L 34-45	Colombia; W 45-35	Argentina; L 39-45	6
Julián Ayala; Brandon Romo; Gibrán Zea	Men's Sabre	Canada; L 40-45	Brazil; W 45-37	Argentina; L 40-45	6
María Fernanda Morales; Frania Tejeda; Sheila Tejeda	Women's Épée	Argentina; W 39-36	Canada; L 31-45	Venezuela; L 42-45	4
Denisse Hernández; Nataly Michel; Melissa Rebolledo	Women's Foil	Argentina; W 44-33	Canada; L 26-45	Brazil; W 45-40	3rd place, bronze medalist(s)
Natalia Botello; Diana González; Julieta Toledo	Women's Sabre	Venezuela; W 45-30	Canada; L 39-45	Argentina; W 45-39	3rd place, bronze medalist(s)

== Field hockey ==
Summary

Team	Event	Group stage				5th-8th Classification	Placement Match	
Team	Event	Opposition Result	Opposition Result	Opposition Result	Rank	Opposition Result	Opposition Result	Rank
Mexico	Men's tournament	Argentina; L 1-10	Peru; W 6-1	Chile; L 0-5	3	Trinidad and Tobago; W 3(2)-(0)3	Brazil; L 0-2	6
Mexico	Women's tournament	Chile; L 0-10	Cuba; D 1-1	Canada; L 0-5	4	Uruguay; L 0-3	Trinidad and Tobago; L 0-1	8

=== Men's ===
Mexico qualified a men's team (of 16 athletes) by winning the 2023 Central American and Caribbean Games.

Group A

Pos	Team	Pld	W	D	L	GF	GA	GD	Pts	Qualification
1	Argentina	3	3	0	0	35	2	+33	9	Semi-finals
2	Chile (H)	3	2	0	1	21	3	+18	6	Semi-finals
3	Mexico	3	1	0	2	7	16	−9	3	5th–8th classification
4	Peru	3	0	0	3	1	43	−42	0	5th–8th classification

Source: FIH
Rules for classification: 1) points; 2) matches won; 3) goal difference; 4) goals for; 5) head-to-head result; 6) field goals for.
(H) Hosts

25 October 2023
17:30

Argentina	10–1	Mexico
Domene 7', 12', 27', 48'; Mazzilli 13'; Toscani 29'; Keenan 35'; Casella 54'; Della Torre 55', 58'	Report	Guzmán 20'

Umpires:
Tyler Klenk (CAN)
Reinier Diaz (CUB)

27 October 2023
17:30

Mexico	6–1	Peru
Estrada 15'; Sosa 30'; Villegas 34'; Muñoz 35'; Leon 57', 59'	Report	Contreras 26'

Umpires:
Oliver Höck (BRA)
Federico Silva (ARG)

29 October 2023
19:30

Mexico	0–5	Chile
	Report	Gesswein 9'; Strabucchi 13'; Amoroso 33'; Hurtado 39'; Becerra 56'

Umpires:
Oliver Höck (BRA)
Ilanggo Kanabathu (MAS)

Cross-overs

1 November 2023
13:30

Mexico	3–3	Trinidad and Tobago
Hernández 24', 53'; Amador 30'	Report	Te. Marcano 8'; Ta. Marcano 38'; Pierre 40'
Penalties
Villegas (penalty shoot-out missed); Hernández (penalty shoot-out missed); Estrada (penalty shoot-out scored); Benedith (penalty shoot-out missed); Castillo (penalty shoot-out scored)	2–0	(penalty shoot-out missed) Te. Marcano; (penalty shoot-out missed) Pierre; (penalty shoot-out missed) Vieira; (penalty shoot-out missed) Ta. Marcano

Umpires:
Oliver Höck (BRA)
Reinier Diaz (CUB)

5th and 6th place

3 November 2023
11:45

Mexico	0–2	Brazil
	Report	Vehrle-Smith 26', 28'

Umpires:
Benjamin Peters (USA)
Fabián Romero (PAR)

=== Women's ===
Mexico qualified a women's team of 16 athletes by reaching the final of the 2023 Central American and Caribbean Games.

Group B

Pos	Team	Pld	W	D	L	GF	GA	GD	Pts	Qualification
1	Chile (H)	3	3	0	0	14	0	+14	9	Semi-finals
2	Canada	3	2	0	1	12	3	+9	6	Semi-finals
3	Cuba	3	0	1	2	2	10	−8	1	5th–8th classification
4	Mexico	3	0	1	2	1	16	−15	1	5th–8th classification

Source: FIH
Rules for classification: 1) points; 2) matches won; 3) goal difference; 4) goals for; 5) head-to-head result; 6) field goals for.
(H) Hosts

26 October 2023
19:30

Chile	10–0	Mexico
Rojas 6', 50'; Urroz 16', 20', 29', 50'; Villagrán 38', 58', 59'; Tala 55'	Report

Umpires:
Emi Yamada (JPN)
Melina Illanes (ARG)

28 October 2023
17:30

Mexico	1–1	Cuba
Cardiel 34'	Report	Vera 24'

Umpires:
Meghan McLennan (CAN)
Megan Robertson (CAN)

30 October 2023
11:30

Mexico	0–5	Canada
	Report	Johansen 13', 33', 56'; McManus 19'; Sawers 39'

Umpires:
Ayanna McClean (TTO)
Claudia Montino (CHI)

Cross-overs

2 November 2023
09:30

Uruguay	3–0	Mexico
Amadeo 17'; Viana 25', 36'	Report

Umpires:
Meghan McClennan (CAN)
Ayanna McClean (TTO)

7th and 8th place

4 November 2023
09:30

Mexico	0–1	Trinidad and Tobago
	Report	Thompson 14'

Umpires:
Natalia Lodeiro (URU)
Claudia Montino (CHI)

== Football ==
Summary

Team	Event	Group stage				Semifinal	Final/BM	
Team	Event	Opposition Result	Opposition Result	Opposition Result	Rank	Opposition Result	Opposition Result	Rank
Mexico	Men's tournament	Chile; L 0-1	Dominican Republic; D 0-0	Uruguay; W 1-0	2	Brazil; L 0-1	United States; W 4-1	3rd place, bronze medalist(s)
Mexico	Women's tournament	Jamaica; W 7-0	Chile; W 3-1	Paraguay; W 4-1	1	Argentina; W 2-0	Chile; W 1-0	1st place, gold medalist(s)

=== Men's ===
Mexico qualified a men's team of 18 athletes after finishing as the top ranked North American team at the 2022 CONCACAF U-20 Championship.

Group A

Pos	Team	Pld	W	D	L	GF	GA	GD	Pts	Qualification
1	Chile (H)	3	3	0	0	7	0	+7	9	Semi-finals
2	Mexico	3	1	1	1	1	1	0	4	Semi-finals
3	Uruguay	3	1	0	2	1	2	−1	3	Fifth place match
4	Dominican Republic	3	0	1	2	0	6	−6	1	Seventh place match

Source: Santiago2023
(H) Host
23 October 2023
20:00

Chile	1–0	Mexico
Guerrero 28'	Report

Estadio Sausalito, Viña del Mar
Referee: Bryan Loayza (Ecuador)

26 October 2023
13:00

Mexico	0–0	Dominican Republic
	Report

Estadio Elías Figueroa Brander, Valparaíso
Referee: Jesús Cartagena (Peru)

29 October 2023
13:00

Uruguay	0–1	Mexico
	Report	Saldivia 28' (o.g.)

Estadio Elías Figueroa Brander, Valparaíso
Referee: Juan López (Paraguay)

Semifinal

1 November 2023
20:00

Mexico	0–1	Brazil
	Report	Leone 2' (o.g.)

Estadio Sausalito, Viña del Mar
Referee: Bryan Loayza (Ecuador)

Bronze Medal match

4 November 2023
15:00

United States	1–4	Mexico
Ikoba 23'	Report	Carrillo 42', 72'; Fulgencio 50'; Ávila 88'

Estadio Sausalito, Viña del Mar
Referee: Fernando Véjar Diaz (Chile)

=== Women's ===
Mexico sent a women's team of 18 athletes. The women's national team did not originally qualified for this tournament but, after Canada withdrew from the competition, they were chosen to replace them.

Group A

Pos	Team	Pld	W	D	L	GF	GA	GD	Pts	Qualification
1	Mexico	3	3	0	0	14	2	+12	9	Semi-finals
2	Chile (H)	3	2	0	1	8	3	+5	6	Semi-finals
3	Paraguay	3	1	0	2	11	5	+6	3	Fifth place match
4	Jamaica	3	0	0	3	0	23	−23	0	Seventh place match

Source: Santiago2023
Rules for classification: Tie-breakers
(H) Hosts
22 October 2023
13:00

Mexico	7–0	Jamaica
Sánchez 12', 75'; Nieto 35'; Palacios 42'; Ordóñez 58'; Cervantes 68'; Corral 85' (pen.)	Report

Estadio Elías Figueroa Brander, Valparaíso
Referee: Paula Andrea Fernandez (Colombia)

25 October 2023
20:00

Chile	1–3	Mexico
Pinilla 37'	Report	Bernal 56'; Sánchez 74'; Ordóñez 88'

Estadio Sausalito, Viña del Mar
Referee: Milagros Arruela (Peru)

28 October 2023
13:00

Mexico	4–1	Paraguay
Camberos 37'; Ordóñez 41'; Sánchez 67'; Ovalle 70'	Report	Fernández 9'

Estadio Sausalito, Viña del Mar
Referee: Priscila Vasquez (Peru)

Semifinal

31 October 2023
17:00

Mexico	2–0	Argentina
Ovalle 32', 89'	Report

Estadio Elías Figueroa Brander, Valparaíso
Referee: Paula Fernández (Colombia)

Gold Medal match

3 November 2023
20:00

Mexico	1–0	Chile
Bernal 29'	Report

Estadio Elías Figueroa Brander, Valparaíso
Referee: Milagros Arruela (Peru)

2023 Pan American Games Women's football tournament
winners

Mexico
1st title

== Golf ==
Mexico qualified a full team of 4 golfers.

Athlete	Event	Round 1	Round 2	Round 3	Round 4	Total		
Athlete	Event	Score	Score	Score	Score	Score	Par	Rank
Abraham Ancer	Men's Individual	68	67	65	67	267	-21	1st place, gold medalist(s)
Carlos Ortiz	Men's Individual	71	64	71	76	282	-6	=14
Isabella Fierro	Women's Individual	71	72	73	75	291	+3	=8
Regina Plasencia	Women's Individual	76	73	71	79	299	+11	17

== Gymnastics ==
=== Artistic ===
Mexico qualified a team of ten gymnasts in artistic (five men and five women) at the 2023 Pan American Championships.

Men

Athlete	Event	Qualification										Final									
Athlete	Event	Apparatus								Total	Rank	Apparatus								Total	Rank
Athlete	Event	F	PH	R	V			PB	HB	Total	Rank	F	PH	R	V			PB	HB	Total	Rank
Athlete	Event	F	PH	R	1	2	Average	PB	HB	Total	Rank	F	PH	R	1	2	Average	PB	HB	Total	Rank
Fabián de Luna	Individual; All-around	Did not participate		13.433	13.433			12.000	Did not participate	38.866	NR	Not eligible									NR
Rodrigo Gómez	Individual; All-around	13.900	13.133	12.800	13.800			12.733	12.433	78.799	11 Q	13.433	12.566	12.866	13.866			12.600	12.400	77.731	11
Josué Juárez	Individual; All-around	Did not participate							12.266	12.266	NR	Not eligible									NR
Isaac Núñez	Individual; All-around	12.600	11.933	12.800	13.966			14.033	13.233	78.565	12 Q	13.200	12.433	12.900	13.833			13.966	11.733	78.065	7
Alonso Pérez	Individual; All-around	13.533	12.233	Did not participate						25.766	NR	Not eligible									NR
Fabián de Luna	Floor	11.066								11.066	42	Did not advance									42
Fabián de Luna	Pommel; Horse		11.800							11.800	13	Did not advance									13
Fabián de Luna	Rings			13.433						13.433	10 q			13.266						13.266	8
Fabián de Luna	Vault				13.433	13.000	13.216			13.216	12										12
Fabián de Luna	Parallel; Bars							12.000		12.000	39	Did not advance									39
Fabián de Luna	Horizontal; Bar								11.833	11.833	37	Did not advance									37
Rodrigo Gómez	Floor	13.900								13.900	6 Q	13.066								13.066	5
Rodrigo Gómez	Pommel; Horse		13.133							13.133	10	Did not advance									10
Rodrigo Gómez	Rings			12.800						12.800	17	Did not advance									23
Rodrigo Gómez	Vault				13.250	12.450	12.850			12.850	9 q				10.933	11.900	11.416			11.416	8
Rodrigo Gómez	Parallel; Bars							12.733		12.733	31	Did not advance									31
Rodrigo Gómez	Horizontal; Bar								12.433	12.433	29	Did not advance									29
Josué Juárez	Floor	Did not participate																			NR
Josué Juárez	Pommel; Horse	DNS									NR	Did not advance									NR
Josué Juárez	Rings			12.166						12.166	38	Did not advance									38
Josué Juárez	Vault	Did not participate																			NR
Josué Juárez	Parallel; Bars							11.400		11.400	43	Did not advance									43
Josué Juárez	Horizontal; Bar								12.266	12.266	33	Did not advance									33
Isaac Núñez	Floor	12.600								12.600	25	Did not advance									25
Isaac Núñez	Pommel; Horse		11.933							11.933	27	Did not advance									27
Isaac Núñez	Rings			12.800						12.800	16	Did not advance									16
Isaac Núñez	Vault				13.966					13.966	—N/a	Did not advance									NR
Isaac Núñez	Parallel; Bars							14.033		14.033	6 Q							13.833		13.833	3rd place, bronze medalist(s)
Isaac Núñez	Horizontal; Bar								13.233	13.233	13	Did not advance									13
Alonso Pérez	Floor	13.533								13.533	12	Did not advance									12
Alonso Pérez	Pommel; Horse		12.233							12.233	19	Did not advance									19
Alonso Pérez	Rings	Did not participate																			NR
Alonso Pérez	Vault	Did not participate																			NR
Alonso Pérez	Parallel; Bars	Did not participate																			NR
Alonso Pérez	Horizontal; Bar	Did not participate																			NR
Fabián de Luna; Rodrigo Gómez; Josué Juárez; Isaac Núñez; Alonso Pérez	Group; All-around											40.033	37.299	39.033	41.199			38.766	37.932	234.262	5

Some competitors decided not to compete in specific apparatus. q= Qualified as other countries exceeded the 2-athlete quota per apparatus.

Women

Athlete	Event	Qualification								Final							
Athlete	Event	Apparatus						Total	Rank	Apparatus						Total	Rank
Athlete	Event	V			UB	BB	F	Total	Rank	V			UB	BB	F	Total	Rank
Athlete	Event	1	2	Average	UB	BB	F	Total	Rank	1	2	Average	UB	BB	F	Total	Rank
Paulina Campos	Individual; All-around	11.566			12.600	11.200	11.833	47.199	15	Did not advance							15
Natalia Escalera	Individual; All-around	13.366			12.266	11.966	12.400	49.998	9 Q	13.633			12.600	12.666	12.933	51.832	6
Cassandra Loustalot	Individual; All-around	12.533			Did not participate	12.666	Did not participate	25.199	NR	Not eligible							NR
Alexa Moreno	Individual; All-around	Did not participate			11.633	Did not participate			NR	Not eligible							NR
Ahtziri Sandoval	Individual; All-around	13.866			13.333	11.866	11.900	50.965	7 Q	13.900			12.933	11.200	11.933	49.966	9
Paulina Campos	Vault	11.566						11.566	—N/a	Did not advance							NR
Paulina Campos	Uneven; Bars				12.600			12.600	10 q				11.400			11.400	8
Paulina Campos	Balance; Beam					11.200		11.200	29	Did not advance							29
Paulina Campos	Floor						11.833	11.833	24	Did not advance							24
Natalia Escalera	Vault	13.366	12.966	13.166				13.166	4 Q	13.600	13.066	13.333				13.333	3rd place, bronze medalist(s)
Natalia Escalera	Uneven; Bars				12.266			12.266	12	Did not advance							12
Natalia Escalera	Balance; Beam					11.966		11.966	16	Did not advance							16
Natalia Escalera	Floor						12.400	12.400	14	Did not advance							14
Cassandra Loustalot	Vault	12.533						12.533	—N/a	Did not advance							NR
Cassandra Loustalot	Uneven; Bars	Did not participate															NR
Cassandra Loustalot	Balance; Beam					12.666		12.666	10 q					13.300		13.300	5
Cassandra Loustalot	Floor						10.900	10.900	38	Did not advance							38
Alexa Moreno	Vault	Did not participate															NR
Alexa Moreno	Uneven; Bars				11.633			11.633	23	Did not advance							23
Alexa Moreno	Balance; Beam	Did not participate															NR
Alexa Moreno	Floor	Did not participate															NR
Ahtziri Sandoval	Vault	13.866	12.633	13.249				13.249	3 Q	13.833	12.600	13.216				13.216	4
Ahtziri Sandoval	Uneven; Bars				13.333			13.333	8 Q				13.466			13.466	4
Ahtziri Sandoval	Balance; Beam					11.866		11.866	18	Did not advance							18
Ahtziri Sandoval	Floor						11.900	11.900	22	Did not advance							22
Paulina Campos; Natalia Escalera; Cassandra Loustalot; Alexa Moreno; Ahtziri Sandoval	Group; All-around									39.765			38.199	36.498	36.133	150.595	4

Some competitors decided not to compete in specific apparatus. q= Qualified as other countries exceeded the 2-athlete quota per apparatus.

=== Rhythmic ===
Mexico qualified two individual gymnasts and five gymnasts for the group event in rhythmic.

Athlete	Event	Qualification						Final					
Athlete	Event	Hoop	Ball	Clubs	Ribbon	Total	Rank	Hoop	Ball	Clubs	Ribbon	Total	Rank
Ledia Juárez	All-around							28.150	26.050	26.750	25.300	106.250	10
Marina Malpica	All-around							32.650	31.850	31.500	30.300	126.300	4
Ledia Juárez	Hoop	28.150				28.150	8 Q	28.100				28.100	7
Ledia Juárez	Ball		26.050			26.050	13	Did not advance					13
Ledia Juárez	Clubs			26.750		26.750	11	Did not advance					11
Ledia Juárez	Ribbon				25.300	25.300	10	Did not advance					10
Marina Malpica	Hoop	32.650				32.650	3 Q	29.500				29.500	5
Marina Malpica	Ball		31.850			31.850	3 Q		31.250			31.250	4
Marina Malpica	Clubs			31.500		31.500	3 Q			28.750		28.750	5
Marina Malpica	Ribbon				30.300	30.300	4 Q				29.600	29.600	6
Dalia Alcocer; Sofia Flores; Julia Gutiérrez; Kimberly Salazar; Adirem Tejeda	Group; All-around							34.150			27.600	61.750	2nd place, silver medalist(s)
Dalia Alcocer; Sofia Flores; Julia Gutiérrez; Kimberly Salazar; Adirem Tejeda	5 Hoops	34.150				34.150	2 Q	34.150				34.150	2nd place, silver medalist(s)
Dalia Alcocer; Sofia Flores; Julia Gutiérrez; Kimberly Salazar; Adirem Tejeda	3 Ribbons + 2 Balls				27.600	27.600	2 Q				28.200	28.200	2nd place, silver medalist(s)

=== Trampoline ===
Mexico qualified five gymnasts in trampoline (two men and three women) at the 2023 Pan American Championships and the 2021 Junior Pan American Games.

Athlete	Event	Qualification		Final	
Athlete	Event	Score	Rank	Score	Rank
Donovan Guevara	Men's Individual	57.080	6 Q	55.650	4
José Marín	Men's Individual	56.020	7 Q	49.240	5
Donovan Guevara; José Marín	Men's Synchronized	43.550	6 Q	35.650	5
Mariola Garcia	Women's Individual	51.210	8	Did not advance	8
Dafne Navarro	Women's Individual	53.520	3 Q	53.550	3rd place, bronze medalist(s)
Patricia Núñez	Women's Individual	52.830	6 Q	24.830	8
Mariola García; Dafne Navarro	Women's Synchronized	17.930	5 Q	45.770	3rd place, bronze medalist(s)

Countries were able to qualify only two athletes to the individual final.

== Handball ==
Summary

Team	Event	Group stage				5th-8th Classification	Placement Match	
Team	Event	Opposition Result	Opposition Result	Opposition Result	Rank	Opposition Result	Opposition Result	Rank
Mexico	Men's Tournament	Brazil; L 19-51	Chile; L 21-32	Dominican Republic; W 26-19	3	Cuba; L 22-25	Dominican Republic; W 29-28	7

=== Men's ===
Mexico qualified a men's team (of 14 athletes) by winning the Last chance qualification tournament.

Group A

Pos	Team	Pld	W	D	L	GF	GA	GD	Pts	Qualification
1	Brazil	3	3	0	0	117	67	+50	6	Semifinals
2	Chile (H)	3	2	0	1	90	72	+18	4	Semifinals
3	Mexico	3	1	0	2	66	102	−36	2	5–8th place semifinals
4	Dominican Republic	3	0	0	3	60	92	−32	0	5–8th place semifinals

Source: Santiago 2023
Rules for classification: 1) points; 2) head-to-head points; 3) head-to-head goal difference; 4) head-to-head goals scored; 5) goal difference; 6) goals scored; 7) draw.
(H) Hosts

30 October 2023; 17:30	Brazil	51–19	Mexico	Gimnasio Polideportivo de Viña del Mar; Referees: Araújo, Perdomo (URU)
30 October 2023; 17:30	Dupoux 13	(25–9)	Rodríguez 6	Gimnasio Polideportivo de Viña del Mar; Referees: Araújo, Perdomo (URU)
30 October 2023; 17:30	1× (yellow card) 2× (suspension)	Report	3× (suspension)	Gimnasio Polideportivo de Viña del Mar; Referees: Araújo, Perdomo (URU)

31 October 2023; 20:00	Mexico	21–32	Chile	Gimnasio Polideportivo de Viña del Mar; Referees: García, Paolantoni (ARG)
31 October 2023; 20:00	Rodríguez, Sánchez 4	(9–19)	Salinas 7	Gimnasio Polideportivo de Viña del Mar; Referees: García, Paolantoni (ARG)
31 October 2023; 20:00	1× (suspension) 1× (red card)	Report	1× (yellow card) 3× (suspension)	Gimnasio Polideportivo de Viña del Mar; Referees: García, Paolantoni (ARG)

1 November 2023; 17:30	Dominican Republic	19–26	Mexico	Gimnasio Polideportivo de Viña del Mar; Referees: Magalhães, Godoy (BRA)
1 November 2023; 17:30	Soto 5	(7–13)	Morales 6	Gimnasio Polideportivo de Viña del Mar; Referees: Magalhães, Godoy (BRA)
1 November 2023; 17:30	6× (suspension) 1× (red card)	Report	2× (suspension)	Gimnasio Polideportivo de Viña del Mar; Referees: Magalhães, Godoy (BRA)

5th-8th Classification

3 November 2023; 12:30	Mexico	22–25	Cuba	Gimnasio Polideportivo de Viña del Mar; Referees: Sosa, Lemes (URU)
3 November 2023; 12:30	Morales 7	(11–12)	García 10	Gimnasio Polideportivo de Viña del Mar; Referees: Sosa, Lemes (URU)
3 November 2023; 12:30	1× (suspension)	Report	1× (yellow card) 4× (suspension)	Gimnasio Polideportivo de Viña del Mar; Referees: Sosa, Lemes (URU)

7th-8th Place

4 November 2023
10:00
Dominican Republic
28–29
Mexico
Gimnasio Polideportivo de Viña del Mar
Referees: Reyes, Zuñiga (CUB)
Beras, Rosario 6
(11–15)
Morales 9
4× (suspension)
Report
1× (yellow card) 3× (suspension)

FT: 24–24 Pen: 4–5

== Judo ==
Mexico has qualified 12 judokas (seven men and five women).

Men

Athlete	Event	Round of 16	Quarterfinals	Semifinals	Repechage	Final / BM	
Athlete	Event	Opposition Result	Opposition Result	Opposition Result	Opposition Result	Opposition Result	Rank
Arath Juárez	−60 kg	Bye	Rojas (COL); L 0-10	Did not advance	Garboa (ECU); W 10-0	Sancho (CRC); W 11-0	3rd place, bronze medalist(s)
Robin Jara	−66 kg	Frascadore (CAN); L 0-10	Did not advance				=9
Gilberto Cardoso	−73 kg	Bye	Falcão (BRA); L 0-1	Did not advance	Estrada (CUB); W 11-0	Sandoval (COL); W 10-0	3rd place, bronze medalist(s)
Samuel Ayala	−81 kg	Bye	McKenzie (CUB); L 0-1	Did not advance	Aprahamian (URU); L 0-1	Did not advance	=7
Ángel García	−90 kg	Coto (ARG); L 0-10	Did not advance				=9
Alexis Esquivel	−100 kg	Santos (BRA); L 0-10	Did not advance				=9
Sergio del Sol	+100 kg	Valdivia (PER); W 10-0	Nova (DOM); L 0-20	Did not advance	Silva (BRA); L 0-10	Did not advance	=7

Women

Athlete	Event	Round of 16	Quarterfinals	Semifinals	Repechage	Final / BM	
Athlete	Event	Opposition Result	Opposition Result	Opposition Result	Opposition Result	Opposition Result	Rank
Edna Carrillo	−48 kg	Bye	Laborde (USA); W 10-0	Lima (BRA); W 10-0	—N/a	Nascimento (BRA); L 0-10	2nd place, silver medalist(s)
Paulina Martínez	−52 kg	Bye	Echavarría (PUR); W 10-0	Cordones (PAN); W 1-0	—N/a	Pimenta (BRA); L 0-10	2nd place, silver medalist(s)
Renata Ortiz	−57 kg	Bye	Gómez (ARG); L 0-10	Did not advance	Cancela (USA); L 0-10	Did not advance	=7
Prisca Awiti	−63 kg	Bye	Harris (CAN); L 0-11	Did not advance	Golden (USA); W 1-0	de Lucía (ARG); W 10-0	3rd place, bronze medalist(s)
Katia Castillo	−70 kg	Castilhos (BRA); L 0-10	Did not advance				=9

Mixed

Athlete	Event	Round of 16	Quarterfinals	Semifinals	Repechage	Final / BM	
Athlete	Event	Opposition Result	Opposition Result	Opposition Result	Opposition Result	Opposition Result	Rank
Prisca Awiti; Samuel Ayala; Gilberto Cardoso; Edna Carrillo; Sergio del Sol; Alexis Esquivel; Ángel García; Robin Jara; Paulina Martínez; Renata Ortiz	Mixed Team	Bye	Cuba; L 1-4	Did not advance	Chile; W 4-0	Colombia; L 2-4	5

== Karate ==
Mexico qualified a team of eight karatekas (five men and three women) at the 2023 North American Cup and the 2023 Pan American Championships.

Kumite

Athlete	Event	Round Robin					Semifinal	Final	
Athlete	Event	Opposition Result	Opposition Result	Opposition Result	Opposition Result	Rank	Opposition Result	Opposition Result	Rank
José Luque	Men's −60 kg	Larrosa (URU); W 6-3	Villalón (CHI); W 1-0	Tolentino (USA); L 1-3	Díaz (CUB); L 1-2	4	Did not advance		=7
Daniel Esparza	Men's −67 kg	Freire (CHI); W 4-3	Figueira (BRA); L 3-4	Madera (VEN); L 0-7	—N/a	4	Did not advance		=7
Carlos Villarreal	Men's −75 kg	Barrios (URU); W 8-0	O'Neil (CAN); W 5-4	Scott (USA); D 0-0	—N/a	1	Landázuri (COL); W W/O	Scott (USA); L 2-3	2nd place, silver medalist(s)
Pablo Benavides	Men's -84 kg	Servín (PAR); W 4-3	Henao (COL); L 1-4	Acevedo (ECU); L 4-7	—N/a	3	Did not advance		=5
Ericka Luque	Women's −55 kg	Fernandes (BRA); L 4-6	Allen (USA); L 0-7	Torres (CUB); L 2-10	—N/a	4	Did not advance		=7
Pamela Campos	Women's −68 kg	Aponte (BOL); W W/O	Cuervo (VEN); W 5-1	Bratic (CAN); L 1-9	Rodrigues (BRA); L 0-10	3	Did not advance		=5
Guadalupe Quintal	Women's +68 kg	Echever (ECU); L 4-5	Madani (USA); W 6-1	Nolet (CAN); W 5-0	—N/a	2	Padilha (BRA); W 3-2	Echever (ECU); W 2-1	1st place, gold medalist(s)

Kata

Athlete	Event	Round Robin				Final/BM	
Athlete	Event	Opposition Result	Opposition Result	Opposition Result	Rank	Opposition Result	Rank
Ahxel Tepal	Men's Individual	Aracena (DOM); L 38.50-40.10	Impagnatiello (ARG); L 37.90-38.40	Torres (USA); L 38.00-41.80	4	Did not advance	=7

== Modern pentathlon ==
Mexico qualified seven modern pentathletes (three men and four women).

Individual

Key

The 36 men and 36 women competed in the ranking round. Afterwards, they were split into 2 groups of 18 to complete the semifinal stage (excluding riding). At the end of the semifinal, 9 out of 18 athletes in each group qualified to the final. In the semifinal, ranks given for each event are within the athlete's group only. The rank for the fencing bonus round considered the ranking round. Q = Qualified for the next round.

Athlete	Event	RR			Semifinal									RR+SF Points	RR+SF Rank	Final												RR+F Points	Final Rank
Athlete	Event	Fencing			Fencing (bonus round)			Swimming (200 m freestyle)			Laser Run (10 m laser pistol) / (3000 m)			RR+SF Points	RR+SF Rank	Riding (show jumping)			Fencing (bonus round)			Swimming (200 m freestyle)			Laser Run (10 m laser pistol) / (3000 m)			RR+F Points	Final Rank
Athlete	Event	Wins	Rank	Points	Wins	Rank	Points	Time	Rank	Points	Time	Rank	Points	RR+SF Points	RR+SF Rank	P	Rank	Points	Wins	Rank	Points	Time	Rank	Points	Time	Rank	Points	RR+F Points	Final Rank
Duilio Carrillo	Men's Individual	25	1	274	2	1	4	2:17.22	11	276	11:13.50	6	627	1181	2 Q	2	4	298	0	1	0	2:13.44	9	284	10:43.80	10	657	1513	2nd place, silver medalist(s)
Emiliano Hernández	Men's Individual	19	4	238	0	3	0	2:10.47	4	290	10:41.60	1	659	1187	1 Q	0	2	300	0	5	0	2:08.56	4	293	9:57.50	1	703	1534	1st place, gold medalist(s)
Manuel Padilla	Men's Individual	18	8	232	0	9	0	2:14.17	6	282	11:22.40	6	618	1132	14 Q	EL	=15	0	1	8	2	2:17.32	15	276	10:03.20	2	697	1207	15
Mariana Arceo	Women's Individual	17	16	220	3	2	6	2:25.00	3	260	11:43.80	1	597	1083	1 Q	43	11	257	5	12	10	2:22.16	1	266	11:50.30	6	590	1343	6
Catherine Oliver	Women's Individual	20	6	238	2	3	4	2:31.61	8	247	12:14.30	4	566	1055	11 Q	10	7	290	0	6	0	2:31.09	9	248	11:09.80	2	631	1407	2nd place, silver medalist(s)
Mayan Oliver	Women's Individual	18	15	226	4	1	8	2:32.37	9	246	12:05.30	2	575	1055	10 Q	0	1	300	0	14	0	2:29.77	6	251	10:54.30	1	646	1423	1st place, gold medalist(s)
Tamara Vega	Women's Individual	22	2	250	2	3	4	2:24.36	1	262	12:52.00	3	528	1044	3 Q	67	12	233	1	2	2	2:23.32	2	264	11:33.30	4	607	1356	5

Team

Key

The pairs did not have a semifinal round like in the individual competition.

Athlete	Event	RR			Final												RR+F Points	Final Rank
Athlete	Event	Fencing			Riding (show jumping)			Fencing (bonus round)			Swimming (200 m freestyle)			Laser Run (10 m laser pistol) / (3000 m)			RR+F Points	Final Rank
Athlete	Event	Wins	Rank	Points	P	Rank	Points	Wins	Rank	Points	Time	Rank	Points	Time	Rank	Points	RR+F Points	Final Rank
Duilio Carrillo; Emiliano Hernández	Men's Relay	22	2	226	43	5	257	3	2	6	1:58.83	6	313	11:29.70	1	611	1413	1st place, gold medalist(s)
Catherine Oliver; Mayan Oliver	Women's Relay	26	1	255	26	1	264	0	6	0	2:19.12	6	272	13:28.20	1	492	1283	1st place, gold medalist(s)
Manuel Padilla; Tamara Vega	Mixed Relay	26	2	230	36	5	264	0	6	0	2:03.96	2	303	12:17.50	1	563	1360	1st place, gold medalist(s)

== Racquetball ==
Mexico qualified six racquetball athletes (three men and three women).

Men

Athlete	Event	Round of 32	Round of 16	Quarterfinal	Semifinal	Final	
Athlete	Event	Opposition Result	Opposition Result	Opposition Result	Opposition Result	Opposition Result	Rank
Eduardo Portillo	Singles	Bye	Ugalde (ECU); W 3–2 (12–10, 10–12, 14–12, 9–11, 11–9)	de la Rosa (USA); W 3–2 (10–12, 13–11, 12–10, 9–11, 13–11)	Conrrado Moscoso (BOL); L 0–3 (3–11, 12–14, 10–12)	Did not advance	3rd place, bronze medalist(s)
Rodrigo Montoya	Singles	Bye	Cueva (ECU); W 3–1 (11–9, 4–11, 11–5, 11–4)	Manilla (USA); W 3–2 (4–11, 11–2, 4–11, 11–5, 11–4)	Keller (BOL); L 2–3 (11–6, 6–11, 13–11, 9–11, 8–11)	Did not advance	3rd place, bronze medalist(s)
Javier Mar; Rodrigo Montoya	Doubles	—N/a	Bye	Argentina; W 3–0 (11–5, 11–1, 12–10)	Costa Rica; W 3–0 (11–4, 11–7, 11–4)	Canada; W 3–1 (6–11, 11–7, 12–10, 12–10)	1st place, gold medalist(s)
Javier Mar; Rodrigo Montoya; Eduardo Portillo	Team	—N/a	Bye	Independent Athletes Team; W 2–0	Canada; L 2–1	Did not advance	3rd place, bronze medalist(s)

Women

Athlete	Event	Round of 32	Round of 16	Quarterfinal	Semifinal	Final	
Athlete	Event	Opposition Result	Opposition Result	Opposition Result	Opposition Result	Opposition Result	Rank
Paola Longoria	Singles	Bye	Delgado (DOM); W 3–0 (11–3, 11–4, 12–10)	Manilla (USA); W 3–0 (11–3, 11–5, 11–9)	Vargas (ARG); W 3–1 (11–7, 11–8, 6–11, 11–7)	Mejía (MEX); W 3-0 (11–9, 11–8, 11–4)	1st place, gold medalist(s)
Montserrat Mejía	Singles	Bye	Sotomayor (ECU); W 3–1 (11–7, 8–11, 12–10, 11–6)	Barrios (BOL); W 3–2 (11–8, 8–11, 11–2, 13–11)	Ortiz (CRC); W 3–0 (11–4, 11–7, 11–4)	Longoria (MEX); L 0–3 (9–11, 8–11, 4–11)	2nd place, silver medalist(s)
Alexandra Herrera; Montserrat Mejía	Doubles	—N/a	Bye	Canada; W 3–0 (11–3, 11–7, 11–7)	Argentina; L 2–3 (11–3, 11–13, 11–3, 7–11, 7–11)	Did not advance	3rd place, bronze medalist(s)
Alexandra Herrera; Paola Longoria; Montserrat Mejía	Team	—N/a	Bye	Canada; W 2–0	United States; W 2–0	Argentina; W 2–1	1st place, gold medalist(s)

Mixed

Athlete	Event	Round of 16	Quarterfinal	Semifinal	Final	
Athlete	Event	Opposition Result	Opposition Result	Opposition Result	Opposition Result	Rank
Paola Longoria; Eduardo Portillo	Doubles	Bye	Chile; W 3–0 (12–10, 11–8, 11–4)	United States; L 2–3 (9–11, 11–13, 11–6, 11–8, 7–11)	Did not advance	3rd place, bronze medalist(s)

== Roller sports ==
=== Artistic Skating ===
Mexico qualified two athletes in figure skating (one per gender).

Athlete	Event	Short program		Long program		Total	
Athlete	Event	Score	Rank	Score	Rank	Score	Rank
Santiago González	Men's Free	29.17	8	56.63	8	85.80	8
Valentina Lomas	Women's Free	38.15	6	68.96	4	107.11	5

=== Skateboarding ===
Mexico qualified a team of two athletes (one man and one woman) in skateboarding.

Athlete	Event	Runs				Rank
Athlete	Event	R1	R2	R3	Best Run	Rank
William Cortez	Men's Park	73.16	63.16	74.57	74.57	5
Nina Arista	Women's Park	66.37	60.14	67.24	67.24	5

=== Speed Skating ===
Athlete	Event	Preliminary		Semifinal		Final	
Athlete	Event	Time	Rank	Time	Rank	Time	Rank
Jorge Martínez	Men's 200 m Time Trial	—N/a				17.566	2nd place, silver medalist(s)
Jorge Martínez	Men's 1000 m Sprint	1:24.536	7 q	—N/a		1:24.891	6
Carlos Monsivais	Men's 10,000 m elimination	—N/a				E	11
Carlos Monsivais	Men's 500 m + Distance	43.339	4 Q	44.130	5 Q	44.108	2nd place, silver medalist(s)
Mariela Casillas	Women's 200 m Time Trial	—N/a				19.527	7
Mariela Casillas	Women's 500 m + Distance	46.949	8 Q	47.128	8 FB	46.772	8
Valentina Letelier	Women's 10,000 m Elimination	—N/a				E	5
Valentina Letelier	Women's 1000 m Sprint	1:28.724	3 q	—N/a		1:29.220	4

== Rowing ==
Mexico qualified a team of 20 athletes (ten men and ten women).

Men

Athlete	Event	Heat		Repechage		Semifinal		Final	
Athlete	Event	Time	Rank	Time	Rank	Time	Rank	Time	Rank
Juan José Flores	M1X	7:31.21	2 S	Bye		7:08.24	2 FA	7:01.27	3rd place, bronze medalist(s)
Miguel Carballo; Alexis López	M2X	7:15.95	3 S	Bye		DNS		Did not advance	NR
Miguel Carballo; Alexis López	LM2X	6:34.95	1 FA	Bye		—N/a		6:22.94	1st place, gold medalist(s)
Ricardo de la Rosa; Tomás Manzanillo; Rafael Mejía; Andre Simsch	M4X	—N/a						6:00.99	3rd place, bronze medalist(s)
Jordy Gutiérrez; Hugo Reyes	M2-	7:03.07	3 Re	6:46.70	1 FA	—N/a		6:38.98	3rd place, bronze medalist(s)
Jordy Gutiérrez; Rafael Mejía; Hugo Reyes; Marco Velázquez	M4-	—N/a						6:12.36	6
Miguel Carballo; Myrtha Constant; Ricardo de la Rosa; Jordy Gutiérrez; Alexis López; Tomás Manzanillo; Hugo Reyes; Andre Simsch; Marco Velázquez	8+	—N/a						5:56.98	6

Women

Athlete	Event	Heat		Repechage		Semifinal		Final	
Athlete	Event	Time	Rank	Time	Rank	Time	Rank	Time	Rank
Kenia Lechuga	W1X	8:11.85	1 S	Bye		7:57.63	1 FA	7:44.63	1st place, gold medalist(s)
Maite Arrillaga; Mildred Mercado	W2X	7:42.99	3 'Re	7:26.28	3 FB	—N/a		7:31.84	8
Daniela Altamirano; Melissa Márquez	LW2X	7:32.09	5 Re	7:28.70	3 FB	—N/a		7:32.74	8
María García; Devanih Plata	W2-	7:54.78	5 Re	7:42.26	3 FB	—N/a		7:38.37	7
Maite Arrillaga; María García; Mildred Mercado; Devanih Plata	W4-	—N/a						6:44.59	3rd place, bronze medalist(s)
Daniela Altamirano; Maite Arrillaga; Ximena Castellanos; Myrtha Constant; María García; Melissa Márquez; Mildred Mercado; Devanih Plata; Naomi Ramírez	8+	—N/a						6:45.91	6

Mixed

Athlete	Event	Heat		Repechage		Semifinal		Final	
Athlete	Event	Time	Rank	Time	Rank	Time	Rank	Time	Rank
Ximena Castellanos; Myrtha Constant; Ricardo de la Rosa; Tomás Manzanillo; Melissa Márquez; Devanih Plata; Naomi Ramírez; Andre Simsch; Antonio Velázquez	8+	6:20.84	3 Re	6:12.93	5 FB	—N/a		6:23.60	7

Ranks indicated are within each heat. S= Semifinal; Re= Repechage; FA= Final A (medal); FB= Final B (non-medal)

== Rugby sevens ==
Summary

Team	Event	Group stage				5th-8th Classification	Placement Match	
Team	Event	Opposition Result	Opposition Result	Opposition Result	Rank	Opposition Result	Opposition Result	Rank
Mexico	Men's tournament	United States; L 7-48	Canada; L 5-42	Brazil; L 0-29	4	Uruguay; L 12-40	Jamaica; L 24-26	8
Mexico	Women's tournament	Brazil; L 0-47	Canada; L 0-69	Chile; L 5-27	4	Jamaica; W 19-14	Paraguay; L 12-26	6

=== Men's ===
Mexico qualified a men's team (of 12 athletes) by reaching the final of the 2022 RAN Super Sevens.

Group B

Pos	Team	Pld	W	D	L	PF	PA	PD	Pts	Qualification
1	United States	3	3	0	0	84	17	+67	9	Semifinals
2	Canada	3	2	0	1	69	36	+33	7	Semifinals
3	Brazil	3	1	0	2	46	39	+7	5	5–8th place semifinals
4	Mexico	3	0	0	3	12	119	−107	3	5–8th place semifinals

Source: Santiago 2023
Rules for classification: 1) Points; 2) Head-to-head result; 3) Point difference; 4) Points scored; 5) draw.

3 November 2023
11:40

United States	48–7	Mexico
Try: Lacamp (2) 0', 0'; Hardirct II (3) 3', 3', 2'; Wendling 4'; Williams (2) 3', 9'; Con: Walsh (2/4) 2', 1', 2'; Hardrict II (1/1) 3'; Wendling 4'; Lacamp (1/1) 3'	Report	Try: Rodríguez Porras 3'; Con: Rodríguez Ramos (1/1) 7'

Estadio Municipal de La Pintana
Referee: Cauã Santos (Brazil)

3 November 2023
17:05

Canada	42–5	Mexico
Try: McDougall 3'; Kratz (2) 8', 3'; Richard (2) 2', 8'; Thiel 4'; Con: Kratz (6/6) 6', 9', 2', 3', 4', 8'	Report	Try: Martín 6'

Estadio Municipal de La Pintana
Referee: Cauã Santos (Brazil)

3 November 2023
20:25

Brazil	29–0	Mexico
Try: Alves 3'; Duque 5'; Teixeira 2'; Menezez 4'; Con: Duque (2/3) 3', 5'; Da Silva 7'	Report

Estadio Municipal de La Pintana
Referee: Francisca Gonzalez (Uruguay)

5th-8th place classification

4 November 2023
11:15

Uruguay	40–12	Mexico
Try: Facciolo 0'; Ardao 1'; Grille (2) 4', 3'; Viñals 7'; Álvarez 6'; Con: Lijtenstein (4/4) 0', 2', 4', 7'; Álvarez (1/2) 3'	Report	Try: Cole 3'; Carmona 7'; Con: Chavez (1/1) 7'

Estadio Municipal de La Pintana
Referee: Cauã Santos (Brazil)

7th and 8th place

4 November 2023
15:50

Mexico	24–26	Jamaica
Try: Martínez-Elhore (2) 3', 6'; Galindo 5'; Falcón 3'; Con: Rodríguez Ramos (2/4) 6', 4'	Report	Try: Green 1'; Facey 8'; Anderson 0'; McNally 5'; Con: St. Claire (1/1) 2'; Franklyn (1/1) 0'; McNally (1/1) 5'

Estadio Municipal de La Pintana
Referee: Adrian Bogado (Paraguay)

=== Women's ===
Mexico qualified a women's team (of 12 athletes) by reaching the final of the 2022 RAN Women's Super Sevens

Group B

Pos	Team	Pld	W	D	L	PF	PA	PD	Pts	Qualification
1	Canada	3	3	0	0	134	21	+113	9	Semifinals
2	Brazil	3	2	0	1	109	29	+80	7	Semifinals
3	Chile	3	1	0	2	27	82	−55	5	5–8th place semifinals
4	Mexico	3	0	0	3	5	143	−138	3	5–8th place semifinals

Source: Santiago 2023
Rules for classification: 1) Points; 2) Head-to-head result; 3) Point difference; 4) Points scored; 5) draw.

3 November 2023
10:50

Brazil	47–0	Mexico
Try: Furtado (4) 1', 4', 1', 7'; Costa 2'; Zanellato 7'; Soares 4'; Con: Campos (3/3) 1', 4', 7'; Nicolau (2/2) 2', 4'; Lima (1/1) 1'	Report

Estadio Municipal de La Pintana
Referee: Gonzalo de Achaval (Argentina)

3 November 2023
15:50

Canada	69–0	Mexico
Try: Carissa Norsten 0'; Hogan-Rochester (2) 2', 1'; Logan 5'; Williams (2) 6', 8'; Romeo (2) 0', 3'; Nicholas 4'; Valenzuela 6'; Con: Hogan-Rochester (6/8) 0', 2', 5', 6', 1', 3'; Nicholas (1/1) 6'	Report

Estadio Municipal de La Pintana
Referee: Nerea Livoni (Argentina)

3 November 2023
19:35

Mexico	5–27	Chile
Try: González 3'	Report	Try: A. Badilla 5'; Rojas (2) 0', 5'; Araneda 2'; N. Badilla 6'; Con: A. Badilla (1/4) 7'

Estadio Municipal de La Pintana
Referee: Francisco Lopez (United States)

5th-8th place classification

4 November 2023
10:25

Jamaica	14–19	Mexico
Try: Walker 0'; Dodd 5'; Con: Rampton (2/2) 1'	Report	Try: Tuyu 6'; Bender 4'; Con: Bender (1/2) 7'

Estadio Municipal de La Pintana
Referee: Nerea Livoni (Argentina)

5th and 6th place

4 November 2023
15:25

Mexico	12–26	Paraguay
Try: Bender 2'; González 2'; Con: Bender (1/1) 2'	Report	Try: Cristaldo (2) 4', 0'; Alfonso 5'; Romero 4'; Con: Viveros (3/4) 4', 0', 5'

Estadio Municipal de La Pintana
Referee: Talal-Azmat Chaudhry (Canada)

== Sailing ==
Mexico qualified 8 boats for a total of 9 sailors.

Men

Athlete	Event	Races																			Total Points	Net Points	Rank
Athlete	Event	1	2	3	4	5	6	7	8	9	10	11	12	13	14	15	16	QF	SF	Final	Total Points	Net Points	Rank
Jerónimo Abogado	IQFoil	~~8~~	2	7	6	7	~~8~~	7	7	8	8	6	8	~~11~~; ~~[UFD]~~	7	8	8	3	Did not advance		116	89	6
Ander Belausteguigoitia; Danel Belausteguigoitia	49er	3	5	4	6	2	5	2	3	~~8~~	3	7	2	—N/a						8	58	50	4
Xavier Villegas	Kite	4	5	5	4	5	~~7~~	6	4	5	4	~~10~~; ~~[DNF]~~	7	4	~~10~~; ~~[DNC]~~	6	4	—N/a		5	90	63	5

Women

Athlete	Event	Races																			Total Points	Net Points	Rank
Athlete	Event	1	2	3	4	5	6	7	8	9	10	11	12	13	14	15	16	QF	SF	Final	Total Points	Net Points	Rank
Mariana Aguilar	IQFoil	1	1	1	~~3~~	~~2~~	1	2	2	2	~~3~~	1	1	2	1	1	1	Bye		1	25	17	1st place, gold medalist(s)
Demita Vega	IQFoil	3	5	~~6~~	2	5	~~6~~	6	5	5	5	~~7~~	6	6	6	5	6	1	2	3	84	65	3rd place, bronze medalist(s)
Elena Oetling	ILCA 6	~~11~~	8	5	6	6	7	3	9	3	8	—N/a								Did not advance	66	55	6
Alejandra Valdez	Sunfish	4	~~7~~	6	7	6	7	5	4	4	3	—N/a								11 [STP]	64	57	5
María Paula Ashida	Kite	~~8~~; ~~[DNF]~~	~~8~~; ~~[DNF]~~	~~8~~; ~~[DNF]~~	8 [DNF]	8 [DNF]	7	8 [DNF]	8 [DNF]	8 [DNF]	8 [DNF]	8 [DNF]	8 [DNF]	4	6	7	6	—N/a		Did not advance	118	94	7

DNF= Did not finish; DNC= Did not compete; STP= Standard Penalty; UFD= Disqualified under U-Flag. In IQFoil and Kite, the three highest race scores got deleted. In 49er, ILCA6 and Sunfish, the highest race score got deleted.

== Shooting ==
Mexico qualified a total of 19 shooters after the 2022 Americas Shooting Championships. Mexico also qualified one shooter by winning one event in the 2021 Junior Pan American Games.

Men

Athlete	Event	Qualification		Final	
Athlete	Event	Points	Rank	Points	Rank
Carlos Quezada	10m Air Rifle	623.3	5 Q	204.8	4
Edson Ramírez	10m Air Rifle	632.4	1 Q	245.5	1st place, gold medalist(s)
Carlos Quezada	50m Air Rifle - 3 Positions	580-29x	4 Q	452.1	1st place, gold medalist(s)
Carlos Quintero	50m Air Rifle - 3 Positions	572-17x	14	Did not advance	14
Carlos González	10m Air Pistol	565-19x	12	Did not advance	12
Daniel Urquiza	10m Air Pistol	563-9x	15	Did not advance	15
Ricardo Valencia	10m Air Pistol	555-7x	27	Did not advance	27
Fidencio González	25m Rapid Fire Pistol	565-12x	7	Did not advance	7
Daniel Urquiza	25m Rapid Fire Pistol	553-9x	15	Did not advance	15
Luis Gallardo	Skeet	117	6 Q	20	6
Carlos Segovia	Skeet	115	9	Did not advance	9
Jorge Orozco	Trap	118	2 Q	16	6
Luis Orranti	Trap	103	22	Did not advance	22

Women

Athlete	Event	Qualification		Final	
Athlete	Event	Points	Rank	Points	Rank
Luisa Márquez	10m Air Rifle	614.5	16	Did not advance	16
Goretti Zumaya	10m Air Rifle	625.0	4 Q	184.5	5
Andrea Palafox	50m Air Rifle - 3 Positions	582-20x	5 Q	394.7	7
Michel Quezada	50m Air Rifle - 3 Positions	564-12x	17	Did not advance	17
Andrea Ibarra	10m Air Pistol	570-12x	9	Did not advance	9
Alejandra Zavala	10m Air Pistol	573-18x	3 Q	234.1	1st place, gold medalist(s)
Andrea Ibarra	25m Pistol	573-14x	3 Q	19	5
Alejandra Zavala	25m Pistol	578-13x	2 Q	29 PR	1st place, gold medalist(s)
Anabel Molina	Skeet	103	11	Did not advance	11
Gabriela Rodríguez	Skeet	120	=1 Q	50+3	2nd place, silver medalist(s)
Verónica Antopia	Trap	94	13	Did not advance	13
Alejandra Ramírez	Trap	107	7	Did not advance	7

Mixed

Athlete	Event	Qualification		Final	
Athlete	Event	Points	Rank	Points	Rank
Luisa Márquez; Carlos Quezada	10m Air Rifle	622.6	3 QB	United States; L 6-16	4
Edson Ramírez; Goretti Zumaya	10m Air Rifle	628.4	2 QG	United States; L 10-16	2nd place, silver medalist(s)
Carlos González; Andrea Ibarra	10m Air Pistol	575-22x	1 QG	Mexico; W 16-8	1st place, gold medalist(s)
Daniel Urquiza; Alejandra Zavala	10m Air Pistol	571-14x	2 QG	Mexico; L 8-16	2nd place, silver medalist(s)
Luis Gallardo; Gabriela Rodríguez	Skeet	143	2 QG	United States; L 39-41	2nd place, silver medalist(s)
Anabel Molina; Carlos Segovia	Skeet	132	7	Did not advance	7

PR= Pan American Record; QG=Qualified for Gold; QB=Qualified for Bronze

== Softball ==
Mexico qualified a women's team (of 18 athletes) by virtue of its campaign in the 2022 Pan American Championships.

Summary

Team	Event	Preliminary Round				Super Round			Final / BM	
Team	Event	Opposition Result	Opposition Result	Opposition Result	Rank	Opposition Result	Opposition Result	Rank	Opposition Result	Rank
Mexico	Tournament	Venezuela; W 9-2	Chile; W 8-0	United States; L 0-7	2	Canada; L 1-6	Puerto Rico; L 0-1	3	Canada; L 0-7	4

Group A

Pos	Team	Pld	W	L	RF	RA	PCT	GB	Qualification
1	United States	3	3	0	34	2	1.000	—	Super Round
2	Mexico	3	2	1	17	9	.667	1	Super Round
3	Venezuela	3	1	2	17	18	.333	2	Fifth place game
4	Chile (H)	3	0	3	0	39	.000	3	Seventh place game

Source: Santiago 2023 and WBSC Americas
(H) Hosts

October 29; 10:00	Mexico	9–2 (F/6)	Venezuela	Baseball and Softball Center, Santiago
October 29; 10:00		Boxscore		Baseball and Softball Center, Santiago

October 30; 16:00	Chile	0–8 (F/5)	Mexico	Baseball and Softball Center, Santiago
October 30; 16:00		Boxscore		Baseball and Softball Center, Santiago

November 1; 13:00	Mexico	0–7 (F/5)	United States	Baseball and Softball Center, Santiago
November 1; 13:00		Boxscore		Baseball and Softball Center, Santiago

Super Round

Pos	Team	Pld	W	L	RF	RA	PCT	GB	Qualification
1	United States	3	3	0	26	6	1.000	—	Gold medal game
2	Puerto Rico	3	2	1	7	13	.667	1	Gold medal game
3	Canada	3	1	2	11	12	.333	2	Bronze medal game
4	Mexico	3	0	3	1	14	.000	3	Bronze medal game

Source: Santiago 2023 and WBSC Americas

November 2; 16:00	Canada	6–1	Mexico	Baseball and Softball Center, Santiago
November 2; 16:00		Boxscore		Baseball and Softball Center, Santiago

November 3; 16:00	Mexico	0–1	Puerto Rico	Baseball and Softball Center, Santiago
November 3; 16:00		Boxscore		Baseball and Softball Center, Santiago

Bronze medal game

November 4; 10:00	Mexico	0–7 (F/5)	Canada (bronze)	Baseball and Softball Center, Santiago
November 4; 10:00		Boxscore		Baseball and Softball Center, Santiago

== Sport climbing ==
Mexico qualified a team of 9 climbers (four men and five women) by virtue of their IFSC world rankings.

Boulder & Lead

Athlete	Event	Semifinal								Final							
Athlete	Event	Bouldering					Lead	Total	Rank	Bouldering					Lead	Total	Rank
Athlete	Event	1	2	3	4	Total	Lead	Total	Rank	1	2	3	4	Total	Lead	Total	Rank
Héctor López	Men's	5.0	9.7	4.9	25.0	44.6	30.1	74.7	17	Did not advance							17
Jair Moreno	Men's	5.0	24.6	5.0	24.7	59.3	48.1	107.4	11	Did not advance							11
Thor Villegas	Men's	9.8	24.9	9.7	25.0	69.4	45.1	114.5	8 Q	10.0	10.0	5.0	10.0	35.0	18.1	53.1	8
María F. González	Women's	5.0	9.2	5.0	10.0	29.2	14.1	43.3	18	Did not advance							18
Arantza Luna	Women's	24.8	9.6	9.8	25.0	69.2	20.1	89.3	10	Did not advance							10

Speed

Athlete	Event	Qualification		Round of 16	Quarterfinal	Semifinal	Final / BM	
Athlete	Event	Best Time	Rank	Opposition Result	Opposition Result	Opposition Result	Opposition Result	Rank
Andrés Alencaster	Men's	7.18	13	Flynn-Pitcher (CAN); L 7.35-5.71	Did not advance			14
Arantza Fernández	Women's	9.80	9	Did not advance				9
María Hidalgo	Women's	14.85	12	Did not advance				12
Valeria Macías	Women's	8.16	4	—N/a	Contreras (CHI); Hunt (USA); Rojas (ECU); L 9.30-6.76-7.60-8.19	Did not advance		5

In elimination rounds, the lower time is the winner.

== Squash ==
Mexico qualified one male athlete by winning the singles event in the 2021 Junior Pan American Games. Mexico also qualified a full team of six athletes (three men and three women) through the 2023 Pan American Squash Championships.

Men

Athlete	Event	Round of 16	Quarterfinal	Semifinal	Final / BM	
Athlete	Event	Opposition Result	Opposition Result	Opposition Result	Opposition Result	Rank
Leonel Cárdenas	Singles	Enríquez (EAI); W 3-2 (11-7, 12-14, 10-12, 11-6, 11-2)	Vargas (COL); W 3-0 (11-6, 11-7, 11-5)	Elías (PER); L 0-3 (3-11, 2-11, 5-11)	Did not advance	3rd place, bronze medalist(s)
César Salazar	Singles	Gallegos (CHI); W 3-0 (11-5, 11-5, 11-8)	Brownell (USA); W 3-0 (12-10, 11-9, 11-9)	Rodríguez (COL); L 0-3 (5-11, 8-11, 7-11)	Did not advance	3rd place, bronze medalist(s)
Leonel Cárdenas; César Salazar	Doubles	—N/a	Chile; W 2-0 (11-7, 11-6)	Peru; W 2-1 (3-11, 11-8, 11-5)	Colombia; L 1-2 (11-9, 3-11, 3-11)	2nd place, silver medalist(s)
Leonel Cárdenas; Arturo Salazar; César Salazar	Team	—N/a	Argentina; L 0-2	Independent Athletes Team; W 2-0; 5th-8th Placement	United States; L 1-2; 5th Place Match	6

Women

Athlete	Event	Round of 16	Quarterfinal	Semifinal	Final / BM	
Athlete	Event	Opposition Result	Opposition Result	Opposition Result	Opposition Result	Rank
Diana García	Singles	Moya (ECU); L 2-3 (11-6, 7-11, 7-11, 11-7, 7-11)	Did not advance			=9
Sarahi López	Singles	Tovar (COL); W 3-2 (12-10, 6-11, 7-11, 11-8, 15-13)	Sobhy (USA); L 0-3 (5-11, 4-11, 1-11)	Did not advance		=5
Diana Gasca; Sarahi López	Doubles	—N/a	Chile; L 0-2 (9-11, 9-11)	Did not advance		=5
Sarahi López; Diana García; Diana Gasca	Team	—N/a	Colombia; L 1-2	Ecuador; W 2-1; 5th-8th Placement	Chile; W 2-0; 5th Place Match	5

Mixed

Athlete	Event	Quarterfinal	Semifinal	Final / BM	
Athlete	Event	Opposition Result	Opposition Result	Opposition Result	Rank
Diana García; Arturo Salazar	Doubles	United States; L 1-2 (11-8, 10-11, 7-11)	Did not advance		=5

== Surfing ==
Mexico qualified five surfers (three men and two women).

Artistic

Athlete	Event	Round 1	Round 2	Round 3	Round 4	Repechage 1	Repechage 2	Repechage 3	Repechage 4	Repechage 5	Final / BM	
Athlete	Event	Opposition Result	Opposition Result	Opposition Result	Opposition Result	Opposition Result	Opposition Result	Opposition Result	Opposition Result	Opposition Result	Opposition Result	Rank
Alan Cleland	Men's Shortboard	Selman (CHI); W 12.83-9.77	González (PAN); W 16.00-4.80	Bellorín (VEN); L 4.93-8.53	Did not advance	—N/a			Young (CAN); L 6.87-11.00	Did not advance		=5
Sebastián Williams	Men's Shortboard	Urbina (CRC); L 9.96-13.04	Did not advance			Young (CAN); L 10.14-12.33	Did not advance					=13
Felipe Rodríguez	Men's Stand Up Paddleboard	Martino (PER); Ruiz (CRC); W 11.40-8.24-6.70	Schweitzer (USA); Spencer (CAN); W 10.90-11.30-8.60	Diniz (BRA); L 3.14-9.76	Did not advance	—N/a		Salazar (CHI); L 10.66-10.77	Did not advance			=5
Regina Pioli	Women's Shortboard	Lima (BRA); L 3.00-9.23	Did not advance			Alonso (PAN); W 4.00-3.67	Lima (BRA); L 3.30-10.30	Did not advance				=9
Coral Bonilla	Women's Longboard	Stokes (CAN); Beisso (URU); L 8.47-7.74-6.67	Did not advance			Reyes (CRC); Wilson (CHI); L 10.33-3.53-3.10	Did not advance					=9

In stand up paddleboard rounds 1 and 2, the two highest scores moved on to the next round.

Race

Athlete	Event	Time	Rank
Sofía Finer	Women's Stand Up Paddleboard	17:28.3	4

== Swimming ==
Mexico qualified three athletes (one man and two women) by winning the respective events in the 2021 Junior Pan American Games.

Key

- Ranks given are overall position after all heats
- Q = Qualified for Final A
- q = Qualified for Final B
- DNS = Did not start

Men

Athlete	Event	Heat		Final	
Athlete	Event	Time	Rank	Time	Rank
Diego Camacho	100m Backstroke	56.39	=13 q	56.30	11
Diego Camacho	200m Backstroke	2:06.54	15 q	2:05.60	14
José Cano	400m Freestyle	3:58.60	12 q	4:00.33	11
José Cano	800m Freestyle	—N/a		8:18.80	15
Gabriel Castaño	50m Freestyle	22.38	4 Q	22.27	5
Miguel de Lara	100m Breaststroke	1:01.75	8 Q	1:00.90	3rd place, bronze medalist(s)
Miguel de Lara	200m Breaststroke	2:16.58	10 q	2:13.22	9
Andrés Dupont	100m Freestyle	48.86	5 Q	49.03	7
Ascanio Fernández	200m Butterfly	2:03.64	14 q	2:02.16	11
Santiago Gutiérrez	1500m Freestyle	—N/a		15:43.39	10
Jorge Iga	50m Freestyle	23.00	15 q	Withdrew	
Jorge Iga	100m Freestyle	49.25	7 Q	49.18	8
Jorge Iga	200m Freestyle	1:49.51	7 Q	1:47.56	2nd place, silver medalist(s)
Jorge Iga	100m Butterfly	54.30	11 q	Withdrew	
Carlos Kossio	200m Breaststroke	2:17.77	14 q	2:18.42	14
José Ángel Martínez	100m Butterfly	53.95	7 Q	53.73	7
José Ángel Martínez	200m Individual Medley	2:04.88	13 q	2:06.48	15
Dylan Porges	400m Freestyle	3:55.84	5 Q	3:55.12	8
Dylan Porges	800m Freestyle	—N/a		8:09.87	7
Dylan Porges	1500m Freestyle	—N/a		15:28.53	5
Andrés Puente	100m Breaststroke	1:02.42	12 q	1:01.18	9
Andrés Puente	200m Breaststroke	2:14.96	4 Q	2:11.99	3rd place, bronze medalist(s)
Héctor Ruvalcaba	200m Freestyle	1:50.52	11 q	1:51.39	11
Héctor Ruvalcaba	200m Butterfly	1:59.44	4 Q	1:58.63	4
Héctor Ruvalcaba	200m Individual Medley	2:04.59	12 q	2:03.82	11
Héctor Ruvalcaba	400m Individual Medley	4:31.33	12 q	Withdrew	
Maximiliano Vega	400m Individual Medley	4:25.40	8 Q	4:23.34	8
Andy Xianyang	100m Backstroke	56.31	11 q	56.50	12
Diego Camacho; Gabriel Castaño; Andrés Dupont; Jorge Iga; José Ángel Martínez	4x100m Freestyle Relay	3:22.07	4 Q	3:19.19	4
José Cano; Andrés Dupont; Santiago Gutiérrez; Jorge Iga; José Ángel Martínez; Dylan Porges; Héctor Ruvalcaba	4x200m Freestyle Relay	7:30.47	3 Q	7:17.66	4
Diego Camacho; José Cano; Miguel de Lara; Andrés Dupont; Jorge Iga; Andrés Puente; Andy Xianyang	4x100m Medley Relay	3:42.22	4 Q	3:37.79	4

Women

Athlete	Event	Heats		Final	
Athlete	Event	Time	Rank	Time	Rank
Laura Arroyo	200m Butterfly	2:14.82	6 Q	2:16.31	7
Isabella Chávez	400m Individual Medley	5:09.84	15 q	5:08.72	13
Magaly Gómez	200m Backstroke	2:22.10	20	Did not advance	20
Miranda Grana	100m Backstroke	1:01.97	4 Q	1:01.51	5
Miranda Grana	200m Backstroke	2:17.83	9 q	2:14.49	9
Miriam Guevara	100m Butterfly	1:00.74	10 q	1:00.74	10
Susana Hernández	200m Freestyle	2:05.47	16 q	2:06.10	16
Fernanda Jiménez	100m Breaststroke	1:11.36	13 q	1:11.05	13
Fernanda Jiménez	200m Breaststroke	2:32.82	8 Q	2:31.43	8
María José Mata	200m Freestyle	2:03.51	12 q	2:03.21	10
María José Mata	200m Butterfly	2:11.32	3 Q	2:10.25	2nd place, silver medalist(s)
María José Mata	200m Individual Medley	2:20.36	10 q	Withdrew	
Athena Meneses	100m Freestyle	57.44	14 q	57.75	14
Athena Meneses	100m Backstroke	1:03.24	13 q	1:02.97	11
Athena Meneses	200m Backstroke	2:19.57	13 q	Withdrew	
Athena Meneses	100m Butterfly	1:01.81	12 q	1:00.84	11
Sofía Revilak	50m Freestyle	25.57	6 Q	25.67	6
Sofía Revilak	100m Freestyle	56.49	9 q	57.31	12
Karen Rodríguez	400m Freestyle	4:32.89	14 q	4:31.00	13
Karen Rodríguez	400m Individual Medley	5:06.49	12 q	5:04.75	12
Melissa Rodríguez	100m Breaststroke	1:09.32	6 Q	1:08.48	6
Melissa Rodríguez	200m Breaststroke	2:31.65	6 Q	2:28.13	5
Melissa Rodríguez	200m Individual Medley	DNS		—N/a	
Andrea Sansores	50m Freestyle	26.12	14 q	25.92	12
Andrea Sansores	100m Backstroke	1:03.10	11 q	1:02.81	10
Miranda Grana; Susana Hernández; María José Mata; Athena Meneses; Sofía Revilak; Andrea Sansores	4x100m Freestyle Relay	3:49.69	7 Q	3:44.90	4
Susana Hernández; María José Mata; Athena Meneses; Karen Rodríguez; Melissa Rodríguez	4x200m Freestyle Relay	8:31.71	6 Q	8:23.56	5
Miranda Grana; Miriam Guevara; Fernanda Jiménez; María José Mata; Athena Meneses; Sofía Revilak; Melissa Rodríguez; Andrea Sansores	4x100m Medley Relay	4:13.11	5 Q	4:04.73	3rd place, bronze medalist(s)

Mixed

Athlete	Event	Heats		Final	
Athlete	Event	Time	Rank	Time	Rank
Gabriel Castaño; Andrés Dupont; Susana Hernández; Jorge Iga; María José Mata; Athena Meneses; Sofía Revilak; Maximiliano Vega	Mixed 4x100m Freestyle Relay	3:39.00	7 Q	3:28.87	4
Miguel de Lara; Andrés Dupont; Miranda Grana; Miriam Guevara; Susana Hernández; Carlos Kossio; José Ángel Martínez; Athena Meneses; Maximiliano Vega	Mixed 4x100m Medley Relay	4:01.13	5 Q	3:54.37	6

Open Water Swimming

Athlete	Event	Final	
Athlete	Event	Result	Rank
Daniel Delgadillo	Men's 10km	1:50:41.0	9
Paulo Strehlke	Men's 10km	1:50:23.8	3rd place, bronze medalist(s)
Paulina Alanís	Women's 10km	2:04:55.0	14
Martha Sandoval	Women's 10km	2:03:46.0	9

== Table tennis ==
Mexico qualified a full team of six athletes (three men and three women) through the 2023 Central American Championships.

Singles and Doubles

Athlete	Event	Round of 32	Round of 16	Quarterfinal	Semifinal	Final / BM	
Athlete	Event	Opposition Score	Opposition Score	Opposition Score	Opposition Score	Opposition Score	Rank
Rogelio Castro	Men's Singles	Burgos (CHI); L 1-4 (8-11, 4-11, 11-8, 7-11, 7-11)	Did not advance				=17
Marcos Madrid	Men's Singles	Campos (CUB); W 4-0 (11-8, 11-4, 11-5, 11-9)	González (PUR); W 4-1 (12-10, 11-5, 11-6, 12-14, 11-9)	Lorenzo (ARG); W 4-0 (11-6, 11-7, 11-6, 11-9)	Calderano (BRA); L 1-4 (8-11, 7-11, 8-11, 11-9, 5-11)	Did not advance	3rd place, bronze medalist(s)
Rogelio Castro; Marcos Madrid	Men's Doubles	—N/a	Brazil; L 0-4 (7-11, 7-11, 8-11, 4-11)	Did not advance			=9
Arantxa Cossío	Women's Singles	Rodríguez (CUB); W 4-0 (11-8, 11-6, 11-5, 11-6)	Perdomo (COL); W 4-0 (11-5, 11-7, 11-2, 11-7)	Zhang (USA); L 1-4 (5-11, 7-11, 7-11, 11-7, 4-11)	Did not advance		=5
Yadira Silva	Women's Singles	Edghill (GUY); W 4-0 (11-4, 11-6, 11-4, 11-8)	Takahashi (BRA); W 4-2 (8-11, 11-8, 11-9, 2-11, 11-8, 11-8)	Díaz (PUR); L 1-4 (8-11, 7-11, 8-11, 11-9, 6-11)	Did not advance		=5
Clio Bárcenas; Arantxa Cossío	Women's Doubles	—N/a	Ecuador; W 4-2 (8-11, 10-12, 11-6, 11-6, 11-8, 11-6)	Chile; L 3-4 (6-11, 11-6, 8-11, 6-11, 11-9, 11-9, 5-11)	Did not advance		=5
Yadira Aguilar; Marcos Madrid	Mixed Doubles	Bye	El Salvador; W 4-1 (11-6, 11-9, 11-7, 6-11, 11-7)	Canada; L 3-4 (5-11, 11-8, 10-12, 11-7, 5-11, 11-9, 8-11)	Did not advance		=5

Team

Athlete	Event	Pool Play			Quarterfinal	Semifinal	Final / BM	
Athlete	Event	Opposition Score	Opposition Score	Group Rank	Opposition Score	Opposition Score	Opposition Score	Rank
Rogelio Castro; Marcos Madrid; José Villa	Men's Team	United States; L 2-3	Cuba; L 2-3	3	Did not advance			=9
Clio Bárcenas; Arantxa Cossío; Yadira Silva	Women's Team	Canada; W 3-2	Venezuela; W 3-0	1	Chile; L 2-3	Did not advance		=5

== Taekwondo ==
Mexico qualified three athletes at Kyorugi events, by virtue of their titles in the 2021 Junior Pan American Games. Mexico qualified an additional 10 athletes (five men and five women) during the Pan American Games Qualification Tournament, eight in the Kyorugi events, and two in Poomsae.

Kyorugi

Athlete	Event	Round of 16	Quarterfinals	Semifinals	Repechage	Final/ BM	
Athlete	Event	Opposition Result	Opposition Result	Opposition Result	Opposition Result	Opposition Result	Rank
Brandon Plaza	Men's -58 kg	Bye	Miranda (ECU); W 2-0	Park (CAN); W 2-1	—N/a	Guzmán (ARG); W 2-1	1st place, gold medalist(s)
Uriel Gómez	Men's -68 kg	Jones (USA); L 0-2	Did not advance		Fernández (CUB); L 1-2	Did not advance	=9
Carlos Navarro	Men's -68 kg	Fernández (CUB); L 1-2	Did not advance				=13
Bryan Salazar	Men's -80 kg	Contreras (VEN); W 2-0	Robleto (NCA); L 1-2	Did not advance			=9
Carlos Sansores	Men's +80 kg	Bye	Arroyo (ECU); W 2-0	Bergeron (CAN); W 2-1	—N/a	Healy (USA); W 2-1	1st place, gold medalist(s)
Uriel Gómez; Carlos Navarro; Bryan Salazar	Men's Team	Bye	Canada; W 61-49	Chile; L 64-81	—N/a	Did not advance	3rd place, bronze medalist(s)
Daniela Souza	Women's -49 kg	Bye	Daniel (USA); W 2-0	Guelet (CHI); W 2-0	—N/a	Ramírez (COL); W 2-1	1st place, gold medalist(s)
Fabiola Villegas	Women's -57 kg	Bye	Montano (ESA); W 2-0	Pacheco (BRA); L 0-2	—N/a	Cox (USA); L 0-2	=5
Leslie Soltero	Women's -67 kg	Castellanos (VEN); W 2-0	Teachout (USA); W 2-0	Kraayeveld (CAN); W 2-1	—N/a	Lee (HAI); W 2-0	1st place, gold medalist(s)
Itzel Velázquez	Women's -67 kg	Rodríguez (DOM); W 2-1	Kraayeveld (CAN); L 0-2	Did not advance			=7
Victoria Heredia	Women's +67 kg	Rivas (ARG); W 2-0	Mosquera (COL); L 0-2	Did not advance	Weekes (PUR); W 2-1	Did not advance	3rd place, bronze medalist(s)
Victoria Heredia; Leslie Soltero; Fabiola Villegas	Women's Team	Bye	Venezuela; W 82-37	Brazil; W 61-60	—N/a	Dominican Republic; L 44-54	2nd place, silver medalist(s)

Poomsae

Athlete	Event	Round of 16	Quarterfinal	Semifinal	Final / BM	
Athlete	Event	Opposition Score	Opposition Score	Opposition Score	Opposition Score	Rank
William Arroyo	Men's Individual	Bye	Navarro (CUB); W 7.73-7.47	del Castillo (PER); W 7.85-7.77	Ortega (NCA); W 7.99-7.88	1st place, gold medalist(s)
Cecilia Lee	Women's Individual	Bye	Moya (CHI); W 7.49-7.21	Reclusado (USA); L 7.66-7.66*	Did not advance	3rd place, bronze medalist(s)
William Arroyo; Cecilia Lee	Mixed Pairs	—N/a			7.92	1st place, gold medalist(s)

Cecilia Lee lost the semifinal due to a lower average execution score. The mixed pairs competition had all 10 teams in the final.

== Tennis ==
Mexico originally qualified a team of four men and three women. However, the Mexican Tennis Federation did not send the paperwork on time, so only two men were able to compete through the ATP and ITF rankings.

Athlete	Event	Round of 64	Round of 32	Round of 16	Quarterfinal	Semifinal	Final / BM	
Athlete	Event	Opposition Score	Opposition Score	Opposition Score	Opposition Score	Opposition Score	Opposition Score	Rank
Ernesto Escobedo	Men's Singles	Bye	Bertran (DOM); W 6-1, 6-3	Boyer (USA); W 3-6, 7^{7}-6^{5}, 7^{7}-6^{4}	Díaz (ARG); L 3-6, 7^{7}-6^{5}, 1-6	Did not advance		=5
Alan Rubio	Men's Singles	Bye	Zhu (USA); W 6-4, 6-3	Hardt (DOM); L 6^{4}-7^{7}, 1-6	Did not advance			=9
Ernesto Escobedo; Alan Rubio	Men's Doubles	—N/a		Chile; L 3-6, 2-6	Did not advance			=9

== Triathlon ==
Mexican triathlete Anahí Álvarez achieved an individual spot after winning the individual competition in the 2021 Junior Pan American Games. Mexico also qualified a team of four triathletes (two men and two women) after finishing second at the 2023 Pan American Mixed Relays Championship.

Individual

Athlete	Event	Swimming (1.5 km)	Transition 1	Biking (40 km)	Transition 2	Running (10 km)	Total	Rank
Rodrigo González	Men's Individual	19:39	0:50	56:28	0:23	32:30	1:49:51	17
Crisanto Grajales	Men's Individual	18:23	0:55	55:28	0:29	30:54	1:46:11	3rd place, bronze medalist(s)
Aram Peñaflor	Men's Individual	18:38	0:49	57:31	0:27	31:19	1:48:46	15
Anahí Álvarez	Women's Individual	DNF						
Mercedes Romero	Women's Individual	19:20	0:56	1:02:06	0:32	37:51	2:00:47	16
Lizeth Rueda	Women's Individual	18:15	1:01	1:03:04	0:35	34:10	1:57:07	1st place, gold medalist(s)
Rosa Tapia	Women's Individual	18:46	0:53	1:02:41	0:26	35:05	1:57:52	3rd place, bronze medalist(s)

Mixed relay

Athlete	Event	Swimming (300 m)	Transition 1	Biking (6.6 km)	Transition 2	Running (1.5 km)	Total	Rank
Crisanto Grajales	Mixed Relay	3:26	0:51	8:37	0:25	4:36	17:55	—N/a
Lizeth Rueda	Mixed Relay	3:57	0:53	9:39	0:28	5:03	20:00	—N/a
Aram Peñaflor	Mixed Relay	3:34	0:40	9:04	0:22	4:48	18:28	—N/a
Rosa Tapia	Mixed Relay	3:59	0:50	9:39	0:26	5:25	20:19	—N/a
Total	Mixed Relay	—N/a					1:16:52	4

== Volleyball ==
=== Beach ===
Summary

Team	Event	Preliminary Round				Quarterfinal Qualifying	Quarterfinal	5th-8th Placement	5th-6th Place	
Team	Event	Opposition Result	Opposition Result	Opposition Result	Rank	Opposition Result	Opposition Result	Opposition Result	Opposition Result	Rank
Miguel Sarabia; Juan Ramón Virgen	Men's Tournament	Paraguay; W 2-1; 19-21, 21-14, 15-13	Nicaragua; W 2-0; 21-15, 21-17	Chile; L 0-2; 17-21, 16-21	2	Colombia; W 2-0; 23-21, 21-19	United States; L 0-2; 18-21, 15-21	Ecuador; W 2-1; 21-14, 16-21, 16-14	Canada; L Walkover - Injury	6
Atenas Gutiérrez; Abril Flores	Women's Tournament	Ecuador; W 2-0; 21-19, 21-17	Costa Rica; W 2-0; 21-12, 21-9	Chile; W 2-0; 21-15, 21-14	1	Bye	Argentina; L 0-2; 16-21, 17-21	Puerto Rico; W 2-1; 17-21, 21-12, 15-11	Peru; W 2-0; 21-9, 21-18	5

=== Indoor ===
Men

Mexico qualified a men's team (of 12 athletes) by winning the 2021 Men's Pan-American Volleyball Cup.

Summary

Team	Event	Group Stage				Quarterfinal	5th-8th Classification	5th-6th Place Match	
Team	Event	Opposition Result	Opposition Result	Opposition Result	Rank	Opposition Result	Opposition Result	Opposition Result	Rank
Mexico	Men's Tournament	Cuba; L 2-3 (20-25, 26-24, 25-19, 25-27, 10-15)	Brazil; L 0-3 (13-25, 15-25, 20-25)	Colombia; L 0-3 (23-25, 23-25, 19-25)	4	Did not advance	Puerto Rico; W 3-2 (25-21, 22-25, 25-21, 28-30, 16-14)	Dominican Republic; L 1-3 (33-31, 22-25, 18-25, 22-25)	6

Women

Mexico qualified a women's team (of 12 athletes) after being the best team from NORCECA at the 2021 Junior Pan American Games.

Summary

Team	Event	Group Stage				Quarterfinal	Semifinal	Final / BM / Pl.	
Team	Event	Opposition Result	Opposition Result	Opposition Result	Rank	Opposition Result	Opposition Result	Opposition Result	Rank
Mexico	Women's Tournament	Colombia; W 3-0 (25-22, 25-13, 25-14)	Dominican Republic; L 0-3 (15-25, 17-25, 19-25)	Chile; W 3-1 (24-26, 25-21, 25-15, 25-18)	2	Puerto Rico; W 3-0 (25-17, 25-17, 25-14)	Brazil; L 2-3 (17-25, 25-22, 25-27, 25-22, 13-15)	Argentina; W 3-2 (22-25, 25-23, 22-25, 25-18, 15-13)	3rd place, bronze medalist(s)

== Water polo ==
Summary

Team	Event	Group stage				Quarterfinal	5th-8th Classification	5th-6th Place Match	
Team	Event	Opposition Result	Opposition Result	Opposition Result	Rank	Opposition Result	Opposition Result	Opposition Result	Rank
Mexico	Men's Tournament	United States; L 2-30	Brazil; L 10-21	Puerto Rico; L 12-15	4	Canada; L 5-20	Cuba; W 16-11	Puerto Rico; L 9-13	6
Mexico	Women's Tournament	Cuba; L 11-14	Argentina; L 6-8	Canada; L 7-32	4	United States; L 1-32	Puerto Rico; W 10-9	Canada; W 15-11	5

=== Men's ===
Mexico qualified a men's team (of 12 athletes) by finishing third at the 2023 Central American and Caribbean Games.

Group A

Pos	Team	Pld	W	PSW	PSL	L	GF	GA	GD	Pts	Qualification
1	United States	3	3	0	0	0	82	18	+64	9	Quarterfinals
2	Brazil	3	2	0	0	1	46	39	+7	6	Quarterfinals
3	Puerto Rico	3	1	0	0	2	29	58	−29	3	Quarterfinals
4	Mexico	3	0	0	0	3	24	66	−42	0	Quarterfinals

Source: Santiago 2023
Rules for classification: 1) points; 2) head-to-head points; 3) head-to-head goal difference; 4) head-to-head number of goals scored; 5) goal difference.

30 October 2023; 18:00	Report	United States	30–2	Mexico	Aquatic Center, Santiago; Referees: Xavier Villanueva (CHI); Daniel Federico Daners (URU)
30 October 2023; 18:00	Report	Score by quarters: 10–0, 7–1, 7–0, 6–1			Aquatic Center, Santiago; Referees: Xavier Villanueva (CHI); Daniel Federico Daners (URU)
30 October 2023; 18:00	Report	R. Dodd 6	Goals	Mercado, Tavera 1	Aquatic Center, Santiago; Referees: Xavier Villanueva (CHI); Daniel Federico Daners (URU)

31 October 2023; 18:00	Report	Brazil	21–10	Mexico	Aquatic Center, Santiago; Referees: Garcia Soto (VEN); Rincón Patiño (COL)
31 October 2023; 18:00	Report	Score by quarters: 5–2, 5–3, 6–3, 5–2			Aquatic Center, Santiago; Referees: Garcia Soto (VEN); Rincón Patiño (COL)
31 October 2023; 18:00	Report	Guimarães, P. Real 5	Goals	Estrada 4	Aquatic Center, Santiago; Referees: Garcia Soto (VEN); Rincón Patiño (COL)

1 November 2023; 18:00	Report	Puerto Rico	15–12	Mexico	Aquatic Center, Santiago; Referees: Jose Garcia Soto (VEN); German Moller (ARG)
1 November 2023; 18:00	Report	Score by quarters: 5–4, 5–6, 2–1, 3–1			Aquatic Center, Santiago; Referees: Jose Garcia Soto (VEN); German Moller (ARG)
1 November 2023; 18:00	Report	D. Zayas 4	Goals	Estrada 4	Aquatic Center, Santiago; Referees: Jose Garcia Soto (VEN); German Moller (ARG)

Quarterfinals

2 November 2023; 19:30	Report	Mexico	5–20	Canada	Aquatic Center, Santiago; Referees: Germán Moller (ARG); Reynel Castillo (PUR)
2 November 2023; 19:30	Report	Score by quarters: 0–4, 3–7, 1–4, 1–5			Aquatic Center, Santiago; Referees: Germán Moller (ARG); Reynel Castillo (PUR)
2 November 2023; 19:30	Report	Estrada 3	Goals	Constantin-Bicari 5	Aquatic Center, Santiago; Referees: Germán Moller (ARG); Reynel Castillo (PUR)

5th-8th place classification

3 November 2023; 15:00	Report	Cuba	11–16	Mexico	Aquatic Center, Santiago; Referees: Jorge Agustin Pinski (ARG); Darren Brown Spiritosanto (USA)
3 November 2023; 15:00	Report	Score by quarters: 3–5, 3–4, 3–2, 2–5			Aquatic Center, Santiago; Referees: Jorge Agustin Pinski (ARG); Darren Brown Spiritosanto (USA)

5th and 6th place

4 November 2023; 17:30	Report	Mexico	9–13	Puerto Rico	Aquatic Center, Santiago; Referees: Danielle Dabbaghian (USA); Harvey Hinds (CUW)
4 November 2023; 17:30	Report	Score by quarters: 2–5, 4–2, 2–4, 1–2			Aquatic Center, Santiago; Referees: Danielle Dabbaghian (USA); Harvey Hinds (CUW)

=== Women's ===
Mexico qualified a women's team (of 12 athletes) through the 2022 CCCAN Championships.

Group A

Pos	Team	Pld	W	PSW	PSL	L	GF	GA	GD	Pts	Qualification
1	Canada	3	3	0	0	0	70	19	+51	9	Quarterfinals
2	Argentina	3	1	1	0	1	35	37	−2	5	Quarterfinals
3	Cuba	3	1	0	1	1	34	53	−19	4	Quarterfinals
4	Mexico	3	0	0	0	3	24	54	−30	0	Quarterfinals

Source: Santiago 2023
Rules for classification: 1) points; 2) head-to-head points; 3) head-to-head goal difference; 4) head-to-head number of goals scored; 5) goal difference.

30 October 2023; 8:00	Report	Mexico	11–14	Cuba	Aquatic Center, Santiago; Referees: Danielle Dabbaghian (USA); Frank Ohme (GER)
30 October 2023; 8:00	Report	Score by quarters: 3–3, 3–4, 4–4, 1–3			Aquatic Center, Santiago; Referees: Danielle Dabbaghian (USA); Frank Ohme (GER)

31 October 2023; 11:00	Report	Mexico	6–8	Argentina	Aquatic Center, Santiago; Referees: Yuri Machado (BRA); David Gomez Pordomingo (ESP)
31 October 2023; 11:00	Report	Score by quarters: 0–0, 0–4, 5–3, 1–1			Aquatic Center, Santiago; Referees: Yuri Machado (BRA); David Gomez Pordomingo (ESP)
31 October 2023; 11:00	Report	Guzmán 3	Goals	Auliel, Leonard 2	Aquatic Center, Santiago; Referees: Yuri Machado (BRA); David Gomez Pordomingo (ESP)

1 November 2023; 8:00	Report	Mexico	7–32	Canada	Aquatic Center, Santiago; Referees: Fernando Teodoro de Brito (BRA); Daniel Federico Daners (URU)
1 November 2023; 8:00	Report	Score by quarters: 2–7, 3–8, 1–8, 1–9			Aquatic Center, Santiago; Referees: Fernando Teodoro de Brito (BRA); Daniel Federico Daners (URU)
1 November 2023; 8:00	Report	Ramírez 3	Goals	Browne 5	Aquatic Center, Santiago; Referees: Fernando Teodoro de Brito (BRA); Daniel Federico Daners (URU)

Quarterfinals

2 November 2023; 12:30	Report	Mexico	1–32	United States	Aquatic Center, Santiago; Referees: Ernesto Hernández Toledo (CUB); Xavier Villanueva (CHI)
2 November 2023; 12:30	Report	Score by quarters: 1–10, 0–11, 0–6, 0–5			Aquatic Center, Santiago; Referees: Ernesto Hernández Toledo (CUB); Xavier Villanueva (CHI)
2 November 2023; 12:30	Report	Ramírez 1	Goals	Steffens 7	Aquatic Center, Santiago; Referees: Ernesto Hernández Toledo (CUB); Xavier Villanueva (CHI)

5th-8th place classification

3 November 2023; 8:00	Report	Puerto Rico	9–10	Mexico	Aquatic Center, Santiago; Referees: Dykman Mikhail (CAN); Danielle Dabbaghian (USA)
3 November 2023; 8:00	Report	Score by quarters: 1–3, 2–3, 3–0, 3–4			Aquatic Center, Santiago; Referees: Dykman Mikhail (CAN); Danielle Dabbaghian (USA)
3 November 2023; 8:00	Report	Montalvo, Quiñones 3	Goals	Ramírez 4	Aquatic Center, Santiago; Referees: Dykman Mikhail (CAN); Danielle Dabbaghian (USA)

5th and 6th place

4 November 2023; 9:30	Report	Mexico	15–11	Cuba	Aquatic Center, Santiago; Referees: Xavier Villanueva Domeque (CHI); Hélène Painchaud
4 November 2023; 9:30	Report	Score by quarters: 4–2, 5–2, 3–2, 3–5			Aquatic Center, Santiago; Referees: Xavier Villanueva Domeque (CHI); Hélène Painchaud
4 November 2023; 9:30	Report	Guzmán 5	Goals	Zunzunegui 5	Aquatic Center, Santiago; Referees: Xavier Villanueva Domeque (CHI); Hélène Painchaud

== Water skiing ==
Mexico qualified two wakeboarders (one of each gender) during the 2022 Pan American Championship.<

Mexico also qualified four water skiers during the 2022 Pan American Water skiing Championship.

Water Skiing

Athlete	Event	Preliminary					Final				
Athlete	Event	Slalom	Jump	Tricks	Total	Rank	Slalom	Jump	Tricks	Total	Rank
Álvaro Lamadrid	Men's Slalom	5.00/58/11.25	—N/a		5.00/58/11.25	7 Q	3.00/58/10.50	—N/a		3.00/58/10.50	4
Carlos Lamadrid	Men's Slalom	3.00/58/10.75	—N/a		3.00/58/10.75	=3 Q	1.50/58/10.25	—N/a		1.50/58/10.25	=6
Álvaro Lamadrid	Men's Jump	—N/a	35.2	—N/a	35.2	8 Q	—N/a	DNS	—N/a	—N/a	NR
Patricio Font	Men's Tricks	—N/a		12090	12090	1 Q	—N/a		11910	11910	1st place, gold medalist(s)
Álvaro Lamadrid	Men's Tricks	—N/a		3710	3710	8	—N/a		Did not advance		9
Carlos Lamadrid	Men's Tricks	—N/a		4600	4600	7 Q	—N/a		DNS		NR
Álvaro Lamadrid	Men's Overall	839.29	307.63	263.57	1410.49	6 Q	1000.00	171.82	381.68	1553.50	6
Martina Font	Women's Slalom	4.00/55/13.00	—N/a		4.00/55/13.00	10	Did not advance	—N/a			10
Martina Font	Women's Jump	—N/a	13.4	—N/a	13.4	7	—N/a	Did not advance	—N/a		7
Martina Font	Women's Tricks	—N/a		3150	3150	10	—N/a		Did not advance		10
Martina Font	Women's Overall	618.18	297.45	0.00	915.63	9	Did not advance				9

Wakeboard

Athlete	Event	Preliminaries		Repechage		Final	
Athlete	Event	Result	Rank	Result	Rank	Result	Rank
Pablo Monroy	Men's Wakeboard	78.33	1 Q	Bye		65.00	5
Fernanda Larios	Women's Wakeboard	56.11	3 Re	77.22	1 Q	53.89	4

== Weightlifting ==
Mexico qualified nine weightlifters (four men and five women).

Athlete	Event	Snatch (kg)		Clean & Jerk (kg)		Total	
Athlete	Event	Weight	Rank	Weight	Rank	Weight	Rank
Víctor Güemez	Men's 61 kg	123	5	153	2	276	2nd place, silver medalist(s)
Jorge Cárdenas	Men's 73 kg	147	3	170	4	317	3rd place, bronze medalist(s)
Antonio Govea	Men's 102 kg	165	4	196	5	361	5
Josué Andueza	Men's +102 kg	165	4	200	5	365	5
Yesica Hernández	Women's 49 kg	DNS					NR
Janeth Gómez	Women's 59 kg	99	4	123	3	222	4
Jessica Jarquín	Women's 71 kg	104	4	126	5	230	5
Lizbeth Nolasco	Women's 81 kg	105	4	127	7	232	6
Adbeel Rodriguez	Women's +81 kg	114	5	150	4	264	4

== Wrestling ==
Mexico qualified 12 wrestlers (seven men and five women) through the 2022 Pan American Wrestling Championships and the 2023 Pan American Wrestling Championships.

Key:

- VT – Victory by fall.
- VB – Victory by injury (VF for forfeit, VA for withdrawal or disqualification)
- PP – Decision by points – the loser with technical points.
- PO – Decision by points – the loser without technical points.
- ST – Great superiority – the loser without technical points and a margin of victory of at least 8 (Greco-Roman) or 10 (freestyle) points.
- SP – Technical superiority – the loser with technical points and a margin of victory of at least 8 (Greco-Roman) or 10 (freestyle) points.

Athlete	Event	Round of 16	Quarterfinal	Semifinal	Final / BM	
Athlete	Event	Opposition Result	Opposition Result	Opposition Result	Opposition Result	Rank
Anthony Valencia	Men's Freestyle 74 kg	Bye	Alvan (BRA); W VT 14-4	Berger (USA); L SP 3-17	Montero (VEN); L PP 2-7	=5
Noel Torres	Men's Freestyle 86 kg	Ramos (PUR); L ST 0-10	Did not advance			9
Samuel Gurría	Men's Greco-Roman 60 kg	Bye	Hafizov (USA); L VF	Did not advance	Peralta (ECU); L VF	NR
Edsson Olmos	Men's Greco-Roman 67 kg	Soto (PER); L VB	Did not advance			9
Emmanuel Benítez	Men's Greco-Roman 77 kg	Cuero (COL); W PP 4-3	Júnior (BRA); L ST 0-8	Did not advance	Rivas (VEN); W PP 5-3	3rd place, bronze medalist(s)
Daniel Vicente	Men's Greco-Roman 87 kg	Bye	Batista (DOM); L PP 0-2	Did not advance		8
Paul Morales	Men's Greco-Roman 130 kg	Bye	Pérez (VEN); L PP 1-5	Did not advance		9
Karla Acosta	Women's Freestyle 53 kg	González (DOM); W ST 10-0	Argüello (VEN); L VT 10-13	Did not advance		7
Susana Lozano	Women's Freestyle 57 kg	Bye	Álvarez (CUB); L PP 0-3	Did not advance		8
Alexis Gómez	Women's Freestyle 62 kg	—N/a	Rentería (COL); L PP 1-4	Did not advance		7
Ámbar Garnica	Women's Freestyle 68 kg	Bye	Sovero (PER); W ST 10-0	Caraballo (VEN); L PP 4-6	Di Bacco (CAN); L PP 6-8	=5
Atzimba Landaverde	Women's Freestyle 76 kg	Bye	Rentería (COL); L ST 0-10	Did not advance	Reasco (ECU); L VT 0-8	=5

== See also ==
- Mexico at the 2021 Junior Pan American Games
- 2023 Central American and Caribbean Games
- Mexico at the 2024 Summer Olympics
