= Ashlee Patiño =

Colombian rhythmic gymnast

- Full name: Ashlee Mariana Patiño Zocadagui
- Born: 2 November 2009 (age 16) Duitama

Gymnastics career
- Discipline: Rhythmic gymnastics
- Country represented: Colombia; (2024–present)
Medal record
Rhythmic gymnastics
Representing Colombia
South American Games
| Bronze medal – third place | 2026 Santa Fe | Group All-Around |
Central American and Caribbean Games
| Silver medal – second place | 2026 Santo Domingo | 5 Balls |
| Silver medal – second place | 2026 Santo Domingo | 3 Hoops + 4 Clubs |
| Bronze medal – third place | 2026 Santo Domingo | Group All-Around |
Bolivarian Games
| Silver medal – second place | 2025 Peru | 3 Balls + 2 Hoops |
Junior South American Championships
| Silver medal – second place | 2024 Aracaju | 5 Hoops |
| Silver medal – second place | 2024 Aracaju | 10 Clubs |

Ashlee Mariana Patiño Zocadagui (born 2 November 2009) is a Colombian rhythmic gymnast. She represents Colombia in international competitions as part of the national group.

== Career ==
=== Junior ===
Patiño competed with hoop at the 2024 Junior Pan American Championships in Guatemala City, helping Colombia take 8th place in teams alongside Juliana Villarreal, Sara Correa and Emiliana Vargas. Later in the year, she was included in the Colombian junior group with Emilia Ospina, Danna Diaz, Susana Torres, and Maria Mendoza Perutti, competing at the South American Championships in Aracaju. They won silver with 5 hoops and 10 clubs.

=== Senior ===
She became age eligible for senior competitions in 2025, and was integrated into the national senior group, competing at the Pan American Championships in Asunción the group was 6th in the All-Around, 6th with 5 ribbons and 7th with 3 balls & 2 hoops. In August, she was selected for the World Championships in Rio de Janeiro along Karen Duarte, Natalia Jimenez, Laura Patiño and Kizzy Rivas. In Brazil, they were 35th in the All-Around, 29th with 5 ribbons and 35th with 3 balls & 2 hoops. In December, she participated in the Bolivarian Games in Lima, winning silver in the mixed apparatus' final.

In 2026, the group competed at the Pan American Championships, being 7th in the All-Around, 5th with 5 balls and 7th with 3 hoops & 4 clubs. A month later, she took part in the Central American and Caribbean Games in Santo Domingo Este, winning bronze in the All-Around and silver in the two event finals. In September, she was selected, with Natalia Jimenez, Adriana Mantilla, Maria Mendoza and Kizzy Rivas, for the South American Games in Santa Fe where she won bronze in the All-Around.
