= Gymnastics at the 2022 Bolivarian Games =

Gymnastics competitions at the 2022 Bolivarian Games

- Gymnastics pictogram
- Venue: Coliseo de Ferias; Coliseo of the Popular University of Cesar
- Dates: 25 June – 3 July 2022
- Competitors: 119 from 11 nations

Gymnastics competitions at the 2022 Bolivarian Games in Valledupar, Colombia were held from 27 June to 3 July 2022 at Coliseo de Ferias and Coliseo of Popular University of Cesar.

Twenty five medal events were contested; 14 in artistic gymnastics (eight for men, six for women), eight in rhythmic (all for women) and 3 in trampoline (one for men, two for women). A total of 119 athletes will compete in the events. The events were open competitions without age restrictions, except for the artistics where gymnasts must be at least 18 (men) and 16 (women) years old by 31 December 2022.

It was planned that a men's synchronized trampolining event would be held, but finally did not take place.

Colombia are the gymnastics competitions defending champions having won them in the previous edition in Santa Marta 2017.

== Participating nations ==
All 11 participating nations at the games (7 ODEBO nations and 4 invited) registered athletes for the gymnastics competitions. Each nation was able to enter a maximum of 28 gymnasts (9 men and 19 women) distributed by disciplines as follows:

- Artistic gymnastics: a team conformed by a maximum of 6 and minimum of 4 gymnasts per gender (a maximum total of 12), or otherwise, a maximum of three gymnasts who would participate as individuals.
- Rhythmic gymnastics: a minimum of 1 and maximum of 10 athletes (all for women).
- Trampoline: up to 6 gymnasts (3 per gender)

- Bolivia (8 athletes)
- Chile (13)
- Colombia (26)
- Ecuador (8)
- El Salvador (1)
- Dominican Republic (10)
- Guatemala (5)
- Panama (6)
- Paraguay (1)
- Peru (17)
- Venezuela (24)

== Venues ==
The gymnastics competitions were held in two venues, both in Valledupar. Artistic gymnastics was held at Coliseo de Ferias Luis Alberto Monsalvo Ramírez located south of Valledupar. Rhythmic gymnastics and trampoline disciplines were held at Coliseo of Popular University of Cesar, the venue that was also going to host the artistic gymnastics before it was moved to the Coliseo de Ferias.

== Medal summary ==
=== Medal table ===
* Host nation (Host nation)

Rank	Nation	Gold	Silver	Bronze	Total
1	Colombia	14	12	3	29
2	Venezuela	4	2	7	13
3	Peru	3	2	1	6
4	Ecuador	1	2	2	5
5	Bolivia	1	2	0	3
6	Chile	1	1	5	7
7	Dominican Republic	1	0	1	2
8	Panama	0	2	4	6
9	Guatemala	0	1	2	3
10	El Salvador	0	1	0	1
Totals (10 entries)		25	25	25	75

Source: Bolivarianos Valledupar 2022 – Artistic gymnastics medals, Rhythmic gymnastics medals, Trampoline medals

=== Medalists ===
==== Artistic gymnastics ====
===== Men's events =====
Event	Gold	Silver	Bronze
Team	Colombia (COL); Kristopher Bohórquez; Christopher Graff; Dilan Jiménez; Andrés Martínez; José Martínez; Sergio Vargas	Peru (PER); Daniel Agüero; Jimmy Figueroa; Mauricio Gallegos; Edward Gonzáles; Arian Prado; Luis Enrique Pizarro	Ecuador (ECU); Pablo Calvache; Israel Chiriboga; César López; Joan Pilay; Johnny Valencia
Individual all-around	Andrés Martínez; Colombia	Dilan Jiménez; Colombia	Edward Gonzáles; Peru
Floor exercise	Andrés Martínez; Colombia	Israel Chiriboga; Ecuador	Joel Álvarez; Chile
Pommel horse	Andrés Martínez; Colombia	José Martínez; Colombia	Víctor Manuel Betancourt; Venezuela
Rings	Kristopher Bohórquez; Colombia	Dilan Jiménez; Colombia	César López; Ecuador
Vault	Edward Gonzáles; Peru	Edwar Rolin; Venezuela	Dilan Jiménez; Colombia
Parallel bars	Víctor Manuel Betancourt; Venezuela	Dilan Jiménez; Colombia	Edwar Rolin; Venezuela
Horizontal bar	Andrés Martínez; Colombia	Edwar Rolin; Venezuela	Joel Álvarez; Chile

===== Women's events =====
Event	Gold	Silver	Bronze
Team	Colombia (COL); Ginna Escobar; Daira Lamadrid; Juliana Ochoa; Laura Pardo; Yiseth Valenzuela; María José Villegas	Peru (PER); Chris Centeno; Fabiana Cuneo; Fabiola Díaz; Ana Karina Méndez; Ximena Rengifo; María Fernanda Zúñiga	Panama (PAN); Valentina Brostella; Victoria Castro; Hillary Heron; Karla Navas; Lucía Paulino
Individual all-around	Ana Karina Méndez; Peru	Alaís Perea; Ecuador	Hillary Heron; Panama
Vault	Yamilet Peña; Dominican Republic	Karla Navas; Panama	Hillary Heron; Panama
Uneven bars	Ana Karina Méndez; Peru	Daira Lamadrid; Colombia	Franchesca Santi; Chile
Balance beam	Alaís Perea; Ecuador	Alexa Grande; El Salvador	Karla Navas; Panama
Floor exercise	Franchesca Santi; Chile	Hillary Heron; Panama	Laura Pardo; Colombia

==== Rhythmic gymnastics ====
===== Individual =====
Event	Gold	Silver	Bronze
Individual all-around	Lina Dussan; Colombia	Vanessa Galindo; Colombia	Javiera Rubilar; Chile
Ball	Vanessa Galindo; Colombia	Lina Dussan; Colombia	Javiera Rubilar; Chile
Clubs	Vanessa Galindo; Colombia	Cibelle González; Bolivia	Isabella Bellizzio; Venezuela
Hoop	Lina Dussan; Colombia	Vanessa Galindo; Colombia	Sophia Fernandez; Venezuela
Ribbon	Waleska Ojeda; Venezuela	Javiera Rubilar; Chile	Vanessa Galindo; Colombia

===== Group =====
Event	Gold	Silver	Bronze
Group all-around	Colombia (COL); Lorena Duarte; Angelica Guerrero; Natalia Jiménez; Adriana Mantilla; Nicol Mora; Kizzy Rivas	Guatemala (GUA); Isabella Barreda; Ashley Miranda; Darlyn Pereira; Leslie Porras; Ariadna Ramírez	Venezuela (VEN); María Domínguez; Waleska Ojeda; Roselyn Palencia; Dahilin Parra; Juliette Quiróz; Yelbery Rodríguez
5 hoops	Venezuela (VEN); María Domínguez; Waleska Ojeda; Roselyn Palencia; Dahilin Parra; Juliette Quiróz; Yelbery Rodríguez	Colombia (COL); Lorena Duarte; Angelica Guerrero; Natalia Jiménez; Adriana Mantilla; Nicol Mora; Kizzy Rivas	Guatemala (GUA); Isabella Barreda; Ashley Miranda; Darlyn Pereira; Leslie Porras; Ariadna Ramírez
3 ribbons + 2 balls	Venezuela (VEN); María Domínguez; Waleska Ojeda; Roselyn Palencia; Dahilin Parra; Juliette Quiróz; Yelbery Rodríguez	Colombia (COL); Lorena Duarte; Angelica Guerrero; Natalia Jiménez; Adriana Mantilla; Nicol Mora; Kizzy Rivas	Guatemala (GUA); Isabella Barreda; Ashley Miranda; Darlyn Pereira; Leslie Porras; Ariadna Ramírez

==== Trampoline ====
Event	Gold	Silver	Bronze
Men's individual	Ángel Hernández; Colombia	Álvaro Calero; Colombia	Junior Mateo; Dominican Republic
Women's individual	Katish Hernández; Colombia	Mariana Espejo; Bolivia	Rebeca Cordero; Venezuela
Women's synchronized	Bolivia (BOL); Mariana Espejo; Anahí Rocha	Colombia (COL); Katish Hernández; Isabel Cardenas	Venezuela (VEN); Rebeca Cordero; Sol Lobo
