= 2025 Bolivarian Games =

International multi-sport event

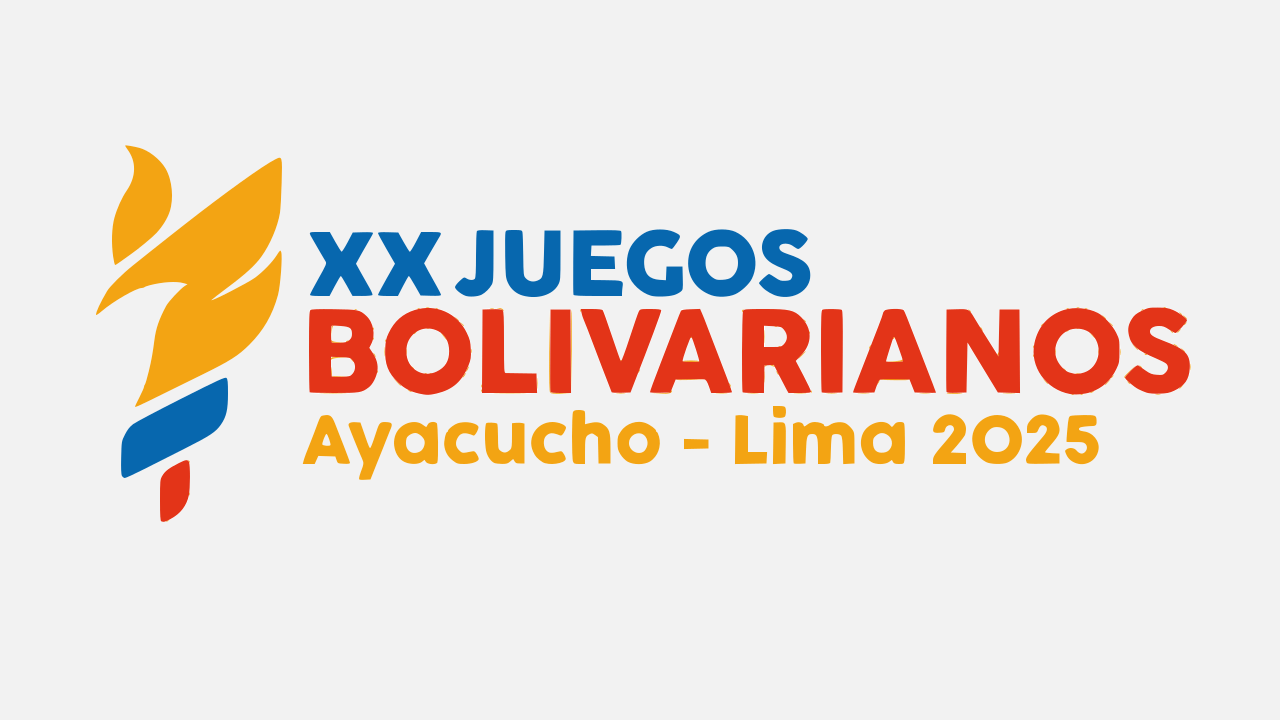
- Host city: Lima and Ayacucho
- Country: Peru
- Nations: 17
- Events: 45 sports
- Opening: 22 November 2025
- Closing: 7 December 2025
- Opened by: Renzo Manyari
- Main venue: Real Felipe Fortress
- Website: www.bolivarianos2025.pe

The 2025 Bolivarian Games (Spanish: Juegos Bolivarianos), officially the XXI Bolivarian Games Lima-Ayacucho 2025, was an international multi-sport event that was held in Lima and Ayacucho, Peru from 22 November to 7 December. It was the fifth time Peru hosted the games (third time in Lima and second in Ayacucho).

== Participating nations ==
All 7 nations of the Organización Deportiva Bolivariana (ODEBO) and 10 invited nations competed in these Games. It is the largest number of nations included in the Games history.

ODEBO nations

- Bolivia (112)
- Chile (297)
- Colombia (430)
- Ecuador (183)
- Panama (112)
- Peru (642) (Host)
- Venezuela (521)

Invited nations

- Barbados (33)
- Costa Rica (47)
- Curaçao (55)
- El Salvador (92)
- Guatemala (136)
- Jamaica (36)
- Paraguay (125)
- Dominican Republic (222)
- Trinidad and Tobago (32)
- Uruguay (21)

== Sports ==
The Games featured 404 events in 45 different sports, encompassing a total of 70 disciplines.

- Aquatics
  - Artistic swimming (2)
  - Diving (10)
  - Open water swimming (4)
  - Swimming (41)
- Archery (10)
- Athletics (43)
- Badminton (5)
- Baseball
  - Baseball (1)
  - Softball (1)
- Basque pelota (8)
- Billiard sports (12)
- Bowling (6)
- Boxing (11)
- Canoeing (13)
- Cricket (2)
- Cycling
  - BMX freestyle (2)
  - BMX racing (2)
  - Mountain biking (2)
  - Road cycling (4)
  - Track cycling (12)
- Electronic sports (2)
- Equestrian (9)
- Fencing (12)
- Field hockey (2)
- Futsal (1)
- Golf (3)
- Gymnastics
  - Aerobic gymnastics (3)
  - Artistic gymnastics (14)
  - Rhythmic gymnastics (9)
  - Trampolining (5)
- Handball (1)
- Inline speed skating (8)
- Judo (17)
- Karate (16)
- Kickboxing (8)
- Modern pentathlon (3)
- Rowing
  - Coastal rowing (5)
  - Rowing (15)
- Rugby sevens (2)
- Sailing (6)
- Shooting (32)
- Skateboarding (4)
- Squash (7)
- Surfing (8)
- Table tennis (7)
- Taekwondo (17)
- Tennis (5)
- Triathlon (5)
- Volleyball
  - Beach volleyball (2)
  - Volleyball (2)
- Water skiing (8)
- Weightlifting (22)
- Wrestling (18)
- Wushu (8)

== Calendar ==
The sports program is as follows.

OC	Opening ceremony	●	Event competitions	1	Medal events	CC	Closing ceremony

November/December		21 Fri	22 Sat	23 Sun	24 Mon	25 Tue	26 Wed	27 Thu	28 Fri	29 Sat	30 Sun	1 Mon	2 Tue	3 Wed	4 Thu	5 Fri	6 Sat	7 Sun	Medal Events
Ceremonies (opening / closing)			OC															CC	—N/a
Aquatics	Artistic swimming														●	2			2
Aquatics	Diving								2	1	1								4
Aquatics	Open water swimming													2		2			4
Aquatics	Swimming			12	12	10	7												41
Archery				●	●	●	5	5											10
Athletics				2						2		4	4	11	8	11	1		43
Badminton				●	1	●	●	5											6
Baseball/Softball	Baseball											●	●	●	●	1			1
Softball			●	●	●	●	1												1
Basque pelota												●	●	●	2	5			7
Billiards									●		2		6						8
Boxing											●	●	●	●		11			13
Bowling														2	2	2			6
Canoeing (sprint)								4	5	4									13
Cricket														●	●	●	2		2
Cycling	BMX freestyle			●	2														2
Cycling	BMX racing					●	2												2
Cycling	Mountain biking			2															2
Cycling	Road cycling						2									2			4
Cycling	Track cycling										4	3	2	3					12
E-sports		●		●	2														2
Equestrian						●	●	2	●	1	●	2	1	1	●	2			9
Fencing					2	2	2	2	2	2									12
Field hockey			●	●	●	●	●	●	2										2
Futsal										●	●	●	●	1					1
Gymnastics	Aerobic gymnastics																●	3	3
Gymnastics	Artistic gymnastics						2	2	5	5									14
Gymnastics	Rhythmic gymnastics												●	2	6				8
Gymnastics	Trampoline											●		●	5				5
Golf													●	●	●	3			3
Handball													●	●	●	●	1		1
Speed skating																	4	4	8
Judo												7	6	4					17
Karate															4	5	5	2	16
Kickboxing																●	8		8
Modern pentathlon											●		2	1					3
Rowing	Coastal rowing																5		5
Rowing	Rowing										3	3	3	3	3				15
Rugby sevens															●	●	2		2
Sailing					●	●	●	6											6
Shooting				4	4	4	2	3	2										19
Squash			●	●	2	●	3	2											7
Skateboarding													●	4					4
Surfing								●	●	●	8								8
Taekwondo									4	4	7	2							17
Table tennis											●	2	●	●	●	5			7
Tennis												●	●	●	1	2	2		5
Triathlon														2		1			3
Volleyball	Beach volleyball												●	●	●	●	●	2	2
Volleyball	Volleyball								●	●	●	●	1	●	●	●	●	1	2
Water skiing								●	6	2									8
Weightlifting				12	2	4	4												22
Wrestling				6	6	6													18
Wushu																●	8		8
Total events		0	0	38	33	26	26	30	27	21	25	23	25	28	40	35	17	10	404
Cumulative total		0	0	38	71	97	123	153	180	201	226	249	274	302	342	377	394	404	N/A
November/December		21 Fri	22 Sat	23 Sun	24 Mon	25 Tue	26 Wed	27 Thu	28 Fri	29 Sat	30 Sun	1 Mon	2 Tue	3 Wed	4 Thu	5 Fri	6 Sat	7 Sun	Medal Events

== Medal table ==
* Host nation (Peru)

Rank	NOC	Gold	Silver	Bronze	Total
1	Colombia	142	122	77	341
2	Venezuela	104	92	115	311
3	Peru*	78	80	104	262
4	Chile	53	57	63	173
5	Ecuador	40	49	44	133
6	Guatemala	30	26	33	89
7	Dominican Republic	12	17	45	74
8	Paraguay	8	15	13	36
9	Panama	7	8	21	36
10	El Salvador	5	7	15	27
11	Uruguay	4	8	7	19
12	Bolivia	1	7	25	33
13	Trinidad and Tobago	1	4	1	6
14	Jamaica	1	0	2	3
15	Barbados	1	0	1	2
16	Curaçao	0	1	1	2
Totals (16 entries)		487	493	567	1,547

Source: Bolivarianos Lima-Ayacucho 2025 – Medallería

== Medalists ==
=== Aerobic gymnastics ===
Event	Gold	Silver	Bronze
Men's individual	Jaider Rodríguez; Colombia	José Parra; Venezuela	Patrick Linares; Bolivia
Women's individual	Andrea León; Venezuela	Daniela Moreno; Colombia	Thais Fernández; Peru
Mixed duet	Colombia; Daniela Moreno; Jaider Rodríguez	Venezuela; Andrea León; Elvis Espinoza	Bolivia; Mila Ormachea; Patrick Linares

=== Archery ===
Event	Gold	Silver	Bronze
Men's individual compound	Julio Barrillas; Guatemala	Roberto Hernández; El Salvador	Daniel Muñoz; Colombia
Men's team compound	Guatemala; José Del Cid; Julio Barrillas; Pedro Salazar	Colombia; Daniel Muñoz; Sebastián Arenas; Pablo Gómez	Venezuela; Diego Camacho; Eduardo González; Sebastián Ávila
Men's individual recurve	Santiago Arcila; Colombia	Jorge Enríquez; Colombia	Andrés Gallardo; Chile
Men's team recurve	Colombia; Javier Carrillo; Jorge Enríquez; Santiago Arcila	Ecuador; Juan Peralta; Léster Ortegón; Pablo Toral	Chile; Andrés Aguilar; Andrés Gallardo; Doménico Frigerio
Women's individual compound	Mariana Rodríguez; Colombia	Alejandra Usquiano; Colombia	Ana Mendoza; Venezuela
Women's team compound	Colombia; Alejandra Usquiano; Juliana Gallego; Mariana Rodríguez	Venezuela; Ana Mendoza; Faviana Biaggiotti; Luzmary Guedez	Peru; Beatriz Aliaga; Milagros Trujillo; Nathaly Hermoza
Women's individual recurve	Isabella Forero; Colombia	Nancy Enríquez; Guatemala	Maira Sepúlveda; Colombia
Women's team recurve	Colombia; Ana Rendón; Isabella Forero; Maira Sepúlveda	Peru; Alexandra Zavala; Daniela Campos; Gianella Hermoza	Not awarded
Mixed team compound	Colombia; Pablo Gómez; Alejandra Usquiano	El Salvador; Roberto Hernández; Sofía Paiz	Venezuela; Ana Mendoza; Sebastián Ávila
Mixed team recurve	Colombia; Isabella Forero; Jorge Enríquez	El Salvador; Jocelyn Urias; Óscar Ticas	Ecuador; Adriana Espinoza; Léster Ortegón

=== Artistic gymnastics ===
Event	Gold	Silver	Bronze
Men's team all-around	Colombia; Andrés Martínez; Juan Ramos; Juan Larrahondo; Sergio Vargas; Yan Zabala	Chile; Diego Espejo; Ignacio Varas; Joel Álvarez; Josué Armijo	Guatemala; Gabriel Paniagua; Jaycko Bourdet; Jorge Vega; Mario Taperio
Men's individual all-around	Joel Álvarez; Chile	Mario Taperio; Guatemala	Yan Zabala; Colombia
Men's vault	Juan Larrahondo; Colombia	Jorge Vega; Guatemala	Wilfry Contreras; Dominican Republic
Men's floor	Juan Larrahondo; Colombia	Jaycko Bourdet; Guatemala	Ignacio Varas; Chile
Men's rings	Diego Espejo; Chile	Mario Taperio; Guatemala	Joel Álvarez; Chile
Men's pommel horse	Jaycko Bourdet; Guatemala	Andrés Martínez; Colombia	Jesús Moreto; Peru
Men's parallel bars	Yan Zabala; Colombia	Joel Álvarez; Chile	Mario Taperio; Guatemala
Men's horizontal bar	Yan Zabala; Colombia	Joel Álvarez; Chile	Andrés Martínez; Colombia
Women's team all-around	Panama; Alyiah Lide; Ana Gutiérrez; Hillary Heron; Karla Navas; Tatiana Tapia	Colombia; Alix Sánchez; Ginna Escobar; Juliana Ochoa; Laura Pardo; Sofía Marin	Peru; Fabiola Díaz; Ana Karina Mendez; Danica Shinsato; Fabiana Cuneo; Luana Terán
Women's individual all-around	Alyiah Lide; Panama	Alaís Perea; Ecuador	Ashley Bohorquez; Ecuador
Women's vault	Karla Navas; Panama	Ashley Bohorquez; Ecuador	Mishel Echeverría; Guatemala
Women's uneven bars	Alaís Perea; Ecuador	Hillary Heron; Panama	Sofía Marín; Colombia
Women's balance beam	Fabiola Díaz; Peru	Mishel Echevarría; Guatemala	Hillary Heron; Panama
Women's floor	Fabiola Díaz; Peru	Alyiah Lide; Panama	Ashley Bohorquez; Ecuador

=== Artistic swimming ===
Event	Gold	Silver	Bronze
Women's solo	Emily Minante; Colombia	Ariana Coronado; Peru	Anastasia Roque; Venezuela
Women's duet	Chile; Soledad García; Trinidad García	Peru; Lia Luna; María Ccoyllo	Colombia; Melisa Ceballos; Sara Castañeda

=== Athletics ===
Event	Gold	Silver	Bronze
Men's 100 metres	Ronal Longa; Colombia	David Vivas; Venezuela	Alexis Nieves; Venezuela
Men's 200 metres	Katriel Angulo; Ecuador	Ronal Longa; Colombia	César Almirón; Paraguay
Men's 400 metres	Kelvis Padrino; Venezuela	Javier Gómez; Venezuela	Anderson Marquínez; Ecuador
Men's 800 metres	Chamar Chambers; Panama	José Antonio Maita; Venezuela	Rafael Muñoz; Chile
Men's 1500 metres	Esteban González; Chile	Luis Huamán; Peru	Juan Ignacio Peña; Chile
Men's 5000 metres	José Luis Rojas; Peru	Luis Masabanda; Ecuador	Diego Uribe; Chile
Men's 10,000 metres	Walter Nina; Peru	Carlos Díaz; Chile	Jhonatan Molina; Peru
Men's 110 metres hurdles	Marcos Herrera; Ecuador	Yohan Chaverra; Colombia	Cristian Rodríguez; Dominican Republic
Men's 400 metres hurdles	Yeral Núñez; Dominican Republic	Sebastián Mosquera; Colombia	Ian Pata; Ecuador
Men's 3000 metres steeplechase	Carlos San Martín; Colombia	Diddier Rodríguez; Panama	Víctor Hugo Aguilar; Bolivia
Men's 4×100 metres relay	Colombia; Ronal Longa; Enoc Moreno; Pedro Agualimpia; Deiner Guaitoto	Dominican Republic; Lidio Andrés Feliz; Melbin Marcelino; Christopher Melenciano; Yancarlos Martínez	Venezuela; Alexis Nieves; David Vivas; Eubrig Maza; Ángel Alvarado
Men's 4×400 metres relay	Venezuela; Axel Gómez; Javier Gómez; José Antonio Maita; Kelvis Padrino	Ecuador; Katriel Angulo; Anderson Marquínez; Ian Pata; Francisco Tejeda	Dominican Republic; Yeral Núñez; Lidio Andrés Feliz; Christopher Melenciano; Wilbert Encarnación
Men's marathon	Ferdinand Cereceda; Peru	Ulises Ambrosio; Peru	Fernando Moreno; Ecuador
Men's half marathon walk	Jordy Jiménez; Ecuador	Luis Henry Campos; Peru	Éider Arévalo; Colombia
Men's marathon walk	César Herrera; Colombia	Luis Henry Campos; Peru	Erick Barrondo; Guatemala
Men's triple jump	Leodan Torrealba; Venezuela	Geiner Moreno; Colombia	William Landinez; Venezuela
Men's pole vault	Ricardo Montes de Oca; Venezuela	Cristóbal Núñez; Chile	Guillermo Correa; Chile
Men's long jump	Arnovis Dalmero; Colombia	José Luis Mandros; Peru	Eubrig Maza; Venezuela
Men's shot put	Ronald Grueso; Colombia	Matías Puschel; Chile	Jhon Zea; Colombia
Men's discus throw	Juan José Caicedo; Ecuador	Claudio Romero; Chile	Lucas Nervi; Chile
Men's javelin throw	Billy Julio; Colombia	Lars Flaming; Paraguay	Carlos Rospigliosi; Peru
Men's decathlon	Julio Angulo; Colombia	Gerson Izaguirre; Venezuela	Carlos Cordoba; Venezuela
Women's 100 metres	Liranyi Alonso; Dominican Republic	Ángela Tenorio; Ecuador	Anahí Suárez; Ecuador
Women's 200 metres	Nicole Caicedo; Ecuador	Anahí Suárez; Ecuador	María Maturana; Colombia
Women's 400 metres	Lina Licona; Colombia	Cristal Cuervo; Panama	Génesis Cañola; Ecuador
Women's 800 metres	Berdine Castillo; Chile	Karla Vélez; Colombia	Valeria Cabezas; Colombia
Women's 1500 metres	Anita Poma; Peru	Javiera Faletto; Chile	Verónica Huacasi; Peru
Women's 5000 metres	Edymar Brea; Venezuela	Benita Parra; Bolivia	Saida Meneses; Peru
Women's 10,000 metres	Edymar Brea; Venezuela	Thalia Valdivia; Peru	Saida Meneses; Peru
Women's 100 metres hurdles	Martha Araújo; Colombia	Maribel Caicedo; Ecuador	María Alejandra Rocha; Colombia
Women's 4×100 metres relay	Colombia; Angélica Gamboa; María Maturana; Marlet Ospino; Danna Bánquez	Dominican Republic; Fiordaliza Cofil; Patricia Sine; Milagros Durán; Liranyi Alonso	Chile; Anaís Hernández; Antonia Ramírez; Macarena Borie; Javiera Cañas
Women's 4×400 metres relay	Colombia; Karla Vélez; Lina Licona; María Alejandra Rocha; Paola Loboa	Dominican Republic; Bianka Acosta; Estrella de Aza; Patricia Sine; Milagros Durán	Venezuela; María Rojas; Nahomy García; Waleska Ortiz; Ana Torin
Women's marathon	Silvia Ortiz; Ecuador	Sheyla Paucar; Peru	Zarita Suárez; Peru
Women's half marathon walk	Kimberly García; Peru	Mary Luz Andía; Peru	Magaly Bonilla; Ecuador
Women's high jump	Helen Tenorio; Colombia	María Arboleda; Colombia	Not awarded
Women's high jump	Helen Tenorio; Colombia	Glenka Antonia; Curaçao	Not awarded
Women's triple jump	Valeria Quispe; Bolivia	Adriana Chila; Ecuador	Silvana Segura; Peru
Women's long jump	Natalia Linares; Colombia	Martha Araújo; Colombia	Ornelis Ortiz; Venezuela
Women's shot put	Rosa Ramírez; Dominican Republic	Ivana Gallardo; Chile	Ahymara Espinoza; Venezuela
Women's discus throw	Yerlin Mesa; Colombia	Karen Gallardo; Chile	Ottaynis Febres; Venezuela
Women's hammer throw	Rosa Rodríguez; Venezuela	Mayra Gaviria; Colombia	Ximena Zorrilla; Peru
Women's heptathlon	Damaris Palomeque; Colombia	Daniela Medrano; Peru	Not awarded
Mixed 4×100 metres relay	Ecuador; Nicole Caicedo; Anahí Suárez; Katriel Angulo; Anderson Marquínez	Colombia; Angélica Gamboa; Marlet Ospino; Enoc Moreno; Deiner Guaitoto	Paraguay; Jonathan Wolk; Xenia Hiebert; Macarena Giménez; Fredy Maidana
Mixed 4×400 metres relay	Colombia; Lina Licona; Paola Loboa; Bernardo Baloyes; Daniel Balanta	Venezuela; Javier Gómez; Kelvis Padrino; Nahomy García; Waleska Ortiz	Dominican Republic; Bianka Acosta; Estrella de Aza; Juander Santos; Ferdy Agramonte

=== Badminton ===
Event	Gold	Silver	Bronze
Men's singles	Uriel Canjura; El Salvador	Adriano Viale; Peru	José Ochoa; Guatemala
Men's singles	Uriel Canjura; El Salvador	Adriano Viale; Peru	Yeison Del Cid; Guatemala
Men's doubles	Guatemala; Christopher Martínez; Jonathan Solís	Peru; Brian Roque; Sharum Durand	Venezuela; Frank Barrios; Jhonathan Guo
Men's doubles	Guatemala; Christopher Martínez; Jonathan Solís	Peru; Brian Roque; Sharum Durand	Peru; Adriano Viale; José Guevara
Women's singles	Ines Castillo; Peru	Juliana Giraldo; Colombia	Namie Miyahira; Peru
Women's singles	Ines Castillo; Peru	Juliana Giraldo; Colombia	Juliana Gabriela; Venezuela
Women's doubles	Guatemala; Diana Corleto; Nikte Sotomayor	Dominican Republic; Claritza Pie; Nairoby Jiménez	Colombia; Juliana Giraldo; Karen Patiño
Women's doubles	Guatemala; Diana Corleto; Nikte Sotomayor	Dominican Republic; Claritza Pie; Nairoby Jiménez	Peru; Ines Castillo; Namie Miyahira
Mixed doubles	Guatemala; Christopher Martínez; Diana Corleto	Peru; José Guevara; Namie Miyahira	Colombia; Miguel Quirama; Juliana Giraldo
Mixed doubles	Guatemala; Christopher Martínez; Diana Corleto	Peru; José Guevara; Namie Miyahira	El Salvador; Uriel Canjura; Fátima Centeno
Mixed team	Guatemala; Christopher Martínez; Diana Corleto; Eneida Santizo; Fátima Gutiérrez; Jonathan Solís; José Ochoa; Nikte Sotomayor; Yeison del Cid	Peru; Adriano Viale; Brian Roque; Fernanda Munar; Ines Castillo; José Guevara; Namie Miyahira; Rafaela Munar; Sharum Durand	Venezuela; Bárbara Lamas; Frank Barrios; Jhonatan Guo; Juliana Gabriela; Mariangel García; Ricardo Torres

=== Baseball ===
Event	Gold	Silver	Bronze
Men's tournament	Colombia; Brayan Buelvas; Carlos Ocampo; Carlos Arroyo; Carlos Diaz; Daniel Vellojin; Dario Borrero; Dayan Frias; Dilson Herrera; Ezequiel Zabaleta; Fabian Echeverria; Guillermo Quintana; Jaider Morelos; Jean Herrera; Jesús Marriaga; José Ramos; Juan Polo; Julio Vivas; Kevin Escorcia; Luis Escobar; Luis De Ávila; Randy Cuentas; Ronald Ramirez; Ruben Galindo; Tito Polo	Peru; Alonso Tenya; Alvaro Nakamatsu; Ángel Gabriel González; Bruno Medina; Daniel Liu; Daniel Ramírez; Denilson Santoyo; Gabriel Hernández; Giancarlo Fukushima; Gianmarco Vega; Joaquín Velez; Jorge Sivirichi; José Salas; Ken Ishihara; Liam Arakaki; Marco Castellano; Mateo Correa; Miguel Pérez; Renzo Meloni; Rider Zevallos; Ryuchi Kobashigawa; Sebastián Oshiro; Susumu Yoza; Yun Contreras	Venezuela; Alvin Herrera; Ángel Arévalo; Carlos Aular; César Idrogo; Cristian Fermin; Dennis Ortega; Eduardo Diaz; Eduardo Figueroa; Enrique Carta; Estiven Machado; Freddy Trejo; Gersel Pitre; Giovanny Rivero; Jesús Paricaguan; Jesús Querales; José Guzmán; Keiner León; Lewis Castillo; Luis Espinoza; Nomar Rojas; Robert Robertis; Wilker Palma; Wilkerman García; Yonathan Mendoza
Men's tournament	Colombia; Brayan Buelvas; Carlos Ocampo; Carlos Arroyo; Carlos Diaz; Daniel Vellojin; Dario Borrero; Dayan Frias; Dilson Herrera; Ezequiel Zabaleta; Fabian Echeverria; Guillermo Quintana; Jaider Morelos; Jean Herrera; Jesús Marriaga; José Ramos; Juan Polo; Julio Vivas; Kevin Escorcia; Luis Escobar; Luis De Ávila; Randy Cuentas; Ronald Ramirez; Ruben Galindo; Tito Polo	Peru; Alonso Tenya; Alvaro Nakamatsu; Ángel Gabriel González; Bruno Medina; Daniel Liu; Daniel Ramírez; Denilson Santoyo; Gabriel Hernández; Giancarlo Fukushima; Gianmarco Vega; Joaquín Velez; Jorge Sivirichi; José Salas; Ken Ishihara; Liam Arakaki; Marco Castellano; Mateo Correa; Miguel Pérez; Renzo Meloni; Rider Zevallos; Ryuchi Kobashigawa; Sebastián Oshiro; Susumu Yoza; Yun Contreras	Curaçao; Cedeon Langguth; Clarence Martina; Clay Winklaar; Dabertson Balentien; Darwin Gregg; Djénior Indjendrick; Farid Cijntje; Gedryon Basilia; Jamal Zalm; Jayden Felicia; Jeremiah Jones; Klevert Martina; Marlison Brunken; Nathan Diaby; Nicasa Simon; Ray-Jacson Chirino; Reyhan Fecunda; Riordan Reeves; Rubyorne Manuel; Ruchano Petronia; Shendrion Martinus; Stephan Vidal; Témesh Juvenal; Timothy Dean

=== Basque pelota ===
Event	Gold	Silver	Bronze
Men's fronton rubber ball	Andre Bellido; Peru	Manuel Pelua; Uruguay	Wolgfangs Mendez; Venezuela
Men's fronton rubber ball	Andre Bellido; Peru	Esteban Romero; Chile	Wolgfangs Mendez; Venezuela
Men's frontball	Jesús Poma; Peru	Renato Bolelli; Chile	Sebastián Méndez; Bolivia
Men's Peruvian fronton	David Yupanqui; Peru	Renato Bolelli; Chile	Diego Quan; Guatemala
Men's frontenis doubles	Chile; Esteban Romero; Renato Bolelli	Peru; David Yupanqui; Renee Escapa	El Salvador; Efraín Segura; Milton Durán
Women's fronton rubber ball	Magdalena Muñoz; Chile	Mia Rodríguez; Peru	Diana Rangel; Venezuela
Women's frontball	Julieta Rengel; Venezuela	Leonella Acosta; Uruguay	Zita Solas; Chile
Women's frontball	Julieta Rengel; Venezuela	Abigail Mena; Bolivia	Zita Solas; Chile
Women's Peruvian fronton	Valeria Garces; Peru	Diana Rangel; Venezuela	Rocío Rengifo; Bolivia
Mixed Peruvian fronton	Peru; Cristopher Martínez; Jessenia Bernal	Chile; Esteban Romero; Magdalena Muñoz	Venezuela; Diana Rangel; Víctor Moreno

=== Beach volleyball ===
Event	Gold	Silver	Bronze
Men's team	Chile; Fernando Quintero; Vicente Droguett	Colombia; Juan Noriega; Yeferson de la Hoz	Paraguay; Giuliano Massare; Gonzalo Melgarejo
Women's team	Paraguay; Denisse Álvarez; Fiorella Nuñez	Ecuador; Ariana Vilela; Karelys Simisterra	Venezuela; Darlin Rodríguez; Sara López

=== Billiards ===
Event	Gold	Silver	Bronze
Men's individual 9-ball	Gerson Martínez; Peru	Luis Lemus; Guatemala	Frailin Guanipa; Venezuela
Men's individual three-cushion carom	Huberney Cataño; Colombia	William Villanueva; Venezuela	Guido Saco; Peru
Men's individual heyball	Edgard Vallenas; Peru	Leonardo Villaroel; Bolivia	Enderson Ramírez; Venezuela
Men's individual snooker	Davison Herrera; Peru	Eder Vargas; Bolivia	Javier Martínez; Venezuela
Men's team 9-ball	Venezuela; Anthony Rodríguez; Frailin Guanipa	Peru; Cristopher Tevez; Gerson Martínez	Bolivia; Alejandro Velasquez; Benjamín García
Men's team three-cushion carom	Peru; Guido Saco; Ramón Rodríguez	Colombia; Alexander Muñoz; Huberney Castaño	Venezuela; Merlin Romero; William Villanueva
Women's individual 9-ball	Andrea Cardona; Colombia	Johanna Espinoza; Venezuela	Jackeline Pérez; Peru
Women's individual three-cushion carom	Johana Sandoval; Colombia	Jessica Mendoza; Peru	Claudia Lalinde; Colombia
Women's individual heyball	Albany González; Venezuela	Andrea Cardona; Colombia	Katherine Corzo; Peru
Women's team 9-ball	Colombia; Andrea Cardona; Laura González	Venezuela; Johanna Espinoza; Mirjana Grujicci	Peru; Jackeline Pérez; Victoria Vasquez
Mixed team 9-ball	Peru; Cristopher Tevez; Victoria Vasquez	Bolivia; Alejandro Velasquez; Nataly Camacho	Venezuela; Frailin Guanipa; Johanna Espinoza
Mixed team three-cushion carom	Colombia; Huberney Cataño; Johana Sandoval	Peru; Jackeline Pérez; Ramón Rodríguez	Venezuela; Merlin Romero; Mirjana Grujicci

=== BMX freestyle ===
Event	Gold	Silver	Bronze
Men's park	Luis Rincón; Colombia	Sebastián Cuellar; Colombia	Job Montañez; Peru
Women's park	Queen Saray Villegas; Colombia	Catalina Henríquez; Chile	Lizsurley Villegas; Colombia

=== BMX racing ===
Event	Gold	Silver	Bronze
Men's race	Juan Velásquez; Colombia	Mauricio Molina; Chile	Wilson Goyes; Ecuador
Women's race	Valentina Muñoz; Colombia	Sharid Fayad; Colombia	Doménica Mora; Ecuador

=== Bowling ===
Event	Gold	Silver	Bronze
Men's singles	José Marroquín; Guatemala	Alfredo Quintana; Colombia	Alejandro Ishikawa; Peru
Men's doubles	Peru; Alejandro Ishikawa; Sebastián Yuzuriha	Guatemala; Diego Aguilar; Juan Pineda	Colombia; Alfredo Quintana; Edwar Rey
Men's team	Guatemala; Diego Aguilar; José Marroquin; Juan Pineda; Marvin León	Colombia; Alfredo Quintana; Edwar Rey; Jaime González; Manuel Otalora	Panama; Alejandro Matos; Donald Lee; Ronnie Rodríguez; William Duen
Women's singles	María Rodríguez; Colombia	Juliana Franco; Colombia	Sofía Rodríguez; Guatemala
Women's doubles	Guatemala; Ana Bolaños; Priscila Girón	Colombia; Juliana Franco; María Rodríguez	Guatemala; Ana Morales; Sofía Rodríguez
Women's team	Colombia; Juliana Botero; Juliana Franco; María Rodríguez; Sara Duque	Guatemala; Ana Bolaños; Ana Morales; Priscila Giron; Sofía Rodríguez	Venezuela; Alicia Marcano; Gilant González; Karen Marcano; Patricia De Faria

=== Boxing ===
Event	Gold	Silver	Bronze
Men's 55 kg	Andrés Cova; Venezuela	José Mijangos; Guatemala	Billy Arias; Ecuador
Men's 55 kg	Andrés Cova; Venezuela	José Mijangos; Guatemala	Luis Pachay; Panama
Men's 60 kg	Yilmar González; Colombia	Cristofer Filos; Panama	Johan Aguero; Dominican Republic
Men's 60 kg	Yilmar González; Colombia	Cristofer Filos; Panama	Francesco Odria; Peru
Men's 65 kg	Jesús Cova; Venezuela	José Víafara; Colombia	Antony Ramírez; Guatemala
Men's 65 kg	Jesús Cova; Venezuela	José Víafara; Colombia	Jeferson Lozano; Peru
Men's 70 kg	José Rodríguez; Ecuador	Lisandro Tejada; Venezuela	Juan Franco; Colombia
Men's 70 kg	José Rodríguez; Ecuador	Lisandro Tejada; Venezuela	Eduardo Beckford; Panama
Men's 80 kg	Diego Motoa; Colombia	Gustiniano Mina; Ecuador	Diego Pereyra; Venezuela
Men's 80 kg	Diego Motoa; Colombia	Gustiniano Mina; Ecuador	Eiser Ortiz; Bolivia
Men's +90 kg	Gerlon Congo; Ecuador	José Agustín; Dominican Republic	Jimmy Quiroz; Bolivia
Women's 51 kg	Irismar Cardozo; Venezuela	Ana Baylón; Peru	Yerlin Quiñones; Colombia
Women's 51 kg	Irismar Cardozo; Venezuela	Ana Baylón; Peru	Elen Roble; Dominican Republic
Women's 54 kg	Diana Maestre; Venezuela	Kely Benítez; Colombia	Helen Sánchez; Ecuador
Women's 54 kg	Diana Maestre; Venezuela	Kely Benítez; Colombia	Jennifer Yool; Guatemala
Women's 57 kg	Omailyn Alcalá; Venezuela	Minerva Montiel; Paraguay	Nahum Alexia; Peru
Women's 60 kg	Krisandy Ríos; Venezuela	Katherine Bera; Dominican Republic	Valeria Arboleda; Colombia
Women's 60 kg	Krisandy Ríos; Venezuela	Katherine Bera; Dominican Republic	María Palacios; Ecuador
Women's 65 kg	Camila Camilo; Colombia	María Chiroy; Guatemala	Genesis Palma; Venezuela

=== Canoeing ===
Event	Gold	Silver	Bronze
Men's C1-200 metres	Alejandro Rodríguez; Colombia	Cristhian Sola; Ecuador	Matías Jiménez; Chile
Men's C2-200 metres	Colombia; Alejandro Rodríguez; Daniel Pacheco	Ecuador; Alan Sola; Cristhian Sola	Venezuela; Jeremi Iglesia; Reinaldo Arguello
Men's K1-200 metres	Daniel Román; Venezuela	Sebastián Alveal; Chile	Cristián Guerrero; Dominican Republic
Men's K2-200 metres	Venezuela; Cristian Canache; Ray Acuña	Chile; Camilo Valdés; Marcelo Godoy	Colombia; Miguel Pinzón; Víctor Baron
Men's K4-200 metres	Venezuela; Cristian Canache; Ray Acuña; Daniel Román; Ulices González	Chile; Camilo Valdés; Marcelo Godoy; Julián Cartes; Sebastián Alveal	Colombia; Juan Torres; Víctor Baron; Luis López; Wber Pérez
Women's C1-200 metres	Karen Roco; Chile	Madison Velásquez; Colombia	Neida Angulo; Ecuador
Women's C2-200 metres	Colombia; Madison Velásquez; Manuela Gómez	Chile; Karen Roco; Sley Figueroa	Venezuela; Luismary Santamaria; Verónica Garrido
Women's K1-200 metres	Diexe Molina; Colombia	Yocelin Canache; Venezuela	Daniela Castillo; Chile
Women's K2-200 metres	Colombia; Diexe Molina; Mónica Agudelo	Venezuela; Mara Guerrero; Yocelin Canache	Chile; Daniela Castillo; Maira Toro
Women's K4-200 metres	Chile; Daniela Castillo; Fernanda Sepúlveda; Florencia Muñoz; Maira Toro	Colombia; Angie Rodríguez; Mónica Agudelo; Sandra Scalia; Yerly Muñoz	Venezuela; Angélica Jiménez; Mara Guerrero; Wuilliany Canache; Yocelin Canache
Mixed C2-200 metres	Colombia; Alejandro Rodríguez; Manuela Gómez	Ecuador; Cristhian Sola; Neida Agulo	Venezuela; Luismary Santamaría; Reinaldo Arguello
Mixed K2-200 metres	Venezuela; Cristian Canache; Yocelín Canache	Chile; Fernanda Sepúlveda; Sebastián Alveal	Colombia; Wber Pérez; Yerly Muñoz
Mixed K4-200 metres	Venezuela; Cristian Canache; Mara Guerrero; Ray Acuña; Yocelin Canache	Colombia; Diexe Molina; Miguel Pinzon; Mónica Hincapié; Victor Baron	Chile; Camilo Valdés; Daniela Castillo; Maira Toro; Sebastián Alveal

=== Coastal rowing ===
Event	Gold	Silver	Bronze
Men's solo	Álvaro Torres; Peru	Marcos Sarraute; Uruguay	Ignacio Vásquez; Dominican Republic
Men's solo	Álvaro Torres; Peru	Jakson Vicent; Venezuela	Ignacio Vásquez; Dominican Republic
Men's double	Peru; Álvaro Torres; Johann Hamann	Uruguay; Leandro Rodas; Marcos Sarraute	Dominican Republic; Jancarlos Tineo; Roderlin Liranzo
Men's double	Peru; Álvaro Torres; Johann Hamann	El Salvador; Diego Peña; Miguel Morán	Dominican Republic; Jancarlos Tineo; Roderlin Liranzo
Women's solo	Pamela Noya; Peru	Agustina López; Paraguay	Wendy Simo; Dominican Republic
Women's double	Chile; Josefa Vila; Victoria Hostetter	Peru; Amalia Aspillaga; Pamela Noya	Uruguay; Nicole Yarzon; Romina Cetraro
Women's double	Chile; Josefa Vila; Victoria Hostetter	Peru; Amalia Aspillaga; Pamela Noya	El Salvador; Andrea Rivas; Ariana Townsend
Mixed double	Peru; Pamela Noya; Johann Hamann	Uruguay; Leandro Rodas; Romina Cetraro	Chile; Manuel Fernández; Victoria Hostetter
Mixed double	Peru; Pamela Noya; Johann Hamann	Paraguay; Agustina López; Nicolás Villalba	Chile; Manuel Fernández; Victoria Hostetter

=== Cricket ===
Event	Gold	Silver	Bronze
Men's team	Barbados; Amari Goodridge; Deswin Currency; Edwin Currency; Giovonte Depeiza; Jamar Ifill; Jerome Jones; Nathan Sealy; Nimar Bolden; Ryshon Williams; Shaquille Cumberbatch; Shian Brathwaite; Tariq O'Neale; Tennyson Roach; Yvan Grant; Zion Brathwaite	Trinidad and Tobago; Andrew Rambaran; Crystian Thurton; Damion Joachim; Daniel Williams; Dejourn Charles; Jesse Bootan; Joshua Davis; Kamil Pooran; Kyle Ramdoo; Leonardo Julien; Mikkel Govia; Sameer Ali; Shaaron Lewis; Teshawon Castro; Vikash Mohan	Jamaica; Adrian Weir; Alwyn Williams; Anthony Dackers; Daniel Beckford; David Dewar; Gordon Bryan; Jamie Hay; Justin Beckford; Matthew Comerie; Michael Clarke; Odaine Mccatty; Ralique Thomas; Ryan Francis; Steven Wedderburn; Trevaun Williams
Women's team	Jamaica; Abigail Bryce; Adanya Baugh; Brianna Plummer; Celina Whyte; Chedean Nation; Chrishana Mckenzie; Jaunel Deers; Jessica Wedderburn; Kate Wilmott; Lena Scott; Moniqueca Reid; Neisha-Ann Waisome; Nicole Campbell; Rashada Williams; Vanessa Watts	Trinidad and Tobago; Ameila Khan; Amrita Ramtahal; Anisa Mohammed; Brianna Harricharan; Britney Cooper; Djenaba Joseph; Karishma Ramharack; Kenika Cassar; Kirbyina Alexander; Lee Kirby; Nadia Mohammed; Samara Ramnath; Shania Abdool; Shunelle Sawh	Barbados; Alisa Scantlebury; Allison Gordon; Asabi Callender; Dicoreya Collymore; Dicyrah Collymore; Elecia Bowman; Erin Deane; Keila Elliott; Krisanne Howell; Naijanni Cumberbatch; Sabriel Headley; Shamilia Connell; Shanika Bruce; Trishan Holder; Zaniyah Bruce

=== Diving ===
Event	Gold	Silver	Bronze
Men's 1 metre springboard	Miguel Tovar; Colombia	Jesús Gonzáles; Venezuela	Donato Neglia; Chile
Men's 3 metre springboard	Miguel Tovar; Colombia	Juan Travieso; Venezuela	Donato Neglia; Chile
Men's 10 metre platform	Jesús Gonzales; Venezuela	Santiago Choez; Ecuador	Leonardo García; Colombia
Men's 3 metre synchronized springboard	Venezuela; Jesús Gonzáles; Juan Travieso	Colombia; Leonardo García; Miguel Tovar	Peru; Adrián Infante; Facundo Meza
Women's 1 metre springboard	Daniela Zapata; Colombia	Ana Ricci; Peru	Gabriela Risunque; Colombia
Women's 3 metre springboard	Daniela Zapata; Colombia	Gabriela Rusinque; Colombia	Mayte Salinas; Peru

=== E-sports ===
Event	Gold	Silver	Bronze
Men's Dota 2 team	Peru; José Padilla; Kerry Paucar; Oswaldo Herrera; Rafael Hinostroza; Rodrigo Cueva	Colombia; Juan Robayo; Juan Quintero; Juan Sandoval; Leonardo Saenz; Nicolas Aldana	Panamá; Diego Valderrama; Eduard Rodríguez; Johan Pitty; José Saldaña; Raymond Baloy
Men's E-Football team	Williams Freire; Uruguay	Oscar Ortega; Ecuador	Ángel García; Colombia

=== Equestrian ===
Event	Gold	Silver	Bronze
Individual general dressage	Julio Mendoza; Ecuador	Mariana England; Colombia	Franziska Klinkicht; Ecuador
Individual freestyle dressage	Julio Mendoza; Ecuador	Franziska Klinkicht; Ecuador	Mariana England; Colombia
Team dressage	Ecuador; Carolina Espinoza; Franziska Klinkicht; Julio Mendoza; María Granja	Colombia; Juliana Gutiérrez; Luis Montoya; Mariana Atehortua; Mariana England	Peru; Christine Malpartida; Jadmer Pipa; Kerstin Rojas; Monika Von Wedemeyer
Individual eventing	Diego Zurita; Ecuador	Jorge Aguilar; Ecuador	Ronald Zabala; Ecuador
Team eventing	Ecuador; Carlos Narváez; Daniel Sarango; Diego Zurita; Jorge Aguilar	Peru; César Bobadilla; Felipe Vasquez; Jorge Salinas; Simón Bolivar	Colombia; Andrés Gómez; Christian Torres; Esteba Bermudez; Mauricio Bermudez
Individual jumping	Luis Larrazabal; Venezuela	Cristóbal Boetto; Chile	Simón Pérez; Colombia
Individual speed jumping	Cristóbal Boetto; Chile	Luis Larrazabal; Venezuela	Eva Paliouras; Peru
Individual general jumping	Cristóbal Boetto; Chile	Luis Larrazabal; Venezuela	Simón Pérez; Colombia
Team jumping	Chile; Constanza Hofmann; Cristóbal Boetto; Emilia Naser; Trinidad Soffia	Venezuela; Anselmo Alvarado; Antonio Martínez; Fernando Plaz; Luis Larrazabal	Colombia; Carlos Urrea; Carlos Ramírez; Joseph Bluman; Simón Pérez

=== Fencing ===
Event	Gold	Silver	Bronze
Men's individual epée	Jhon Édison Rodríguez; Colombia	Francisco Limardo; Venezuela	Arturo Dorati; Panama
Men's individual epée	Jhon Édison Rodríguez; Colombia	Francisco Limardo; Venezuela	Jesús Limardo; Venezuela
Men's individual foil	Renzo Fukuda; Peru	Janderson Briceño; Venezuela	Miguel Grajales; Colombia
Men's individual foil	Renzo Fukuda; Peru	Janderson Briceño; Venezuela	Leopoldo Alarcón; Chile
Men's individual sabre	Eliecér Romero; Venezuela	Lukas Eichhorn; Peru	José Quintero; Venezuela
Men's individual sabre	Eliecér Romero; Venezuela	Lukas Eichhorn; Peru	Samuel Gualtero; Colombia
Men's team epée	Venezuela; Francisco Limardo; Grabiel Lugo; Jesús Limardo; Rubén Limardo	Colombia; Hernando Roa; Jhon Édison Rodríguez; Juan Castillo	Chile; Felipe González; Jorge Valderrama; Pablo Núñez
Men's team foil	Chile; David Alarcón; Leopoldo Alarcón; Vicente Otayza	Peru; Alessio Fukuda; Isaac Ariza; Joaquín Espinoza; Renzo Fukuda	Colombia; Alejandro Bolaños; Isaac Camayo; Miguel Grajales
Men's team sabre	Venezuela; Eliecer Romero; José Quitero; Marcel Medina; Simón Durán	Chile; Manuel Bahamonde; Ricardo Álvarez; Roberto Monsalva	Colombia; Juan Pachecho; Mario Palacios; Samuel Gualtero
Women's individual epée	María Luisa Doig; Peru	Gabriela Viveros; Paraguay	Carmen Correa; Colombia
Women's individual epée	María Luisa Doig; Peru	Gabriela Viveros; Paraguay	Analia Fernández; Chile
Women's individual foil	Arantza Inostroza; Chile	Anabella Acurero; Venezuela	Isis Giménez; Venezuela
Women's individual foil	Arantza Inostroza; Chile	Anabella Acurero; Venezuela	Lisa Montecinos; Chile
Women's individual sabre	Katherine Paredes; Venezuela	María Blanco; Colombia	Andrea Moros; Venezuela
Women's individual sabre	Katherine Paredes; Venezuela	María Blanco; Colombia	Valentina Beltrán; Colombia
Women's team epée	Venezuela; Clarismar Farias; Eliana Lugo; Lizze Asis; Victoria Guerrero	Paraguay; Gabriela Viveros; Janine Alcaraz; Jimena Cabrera	Colombia; Alejandra Piedrahita; Carmen Correa; Laura Castillo
Women's team foil	Chile; Arantza Inostroza; Lisa Montecinos; Rafaela Santibáñez	Colombia; Juliana Pineda; Laura Guerra; María Gutiérrez; Tatiana Pireto	Venezuela; Anabella Acurero; Bárbara Manrique; Hillary Avelleira; Isis Giménez
Women's team sabre	Venezuela; Andrea Moros; Ariana Pireto; Ivana Hatem; Katherine Paredes	Colombia; María Blanco; María Gutiérrez; Valentina Beltrán	Bolivia; Briana Iriarte; Camila Torrico; Flavia Quiroga

=== Field hockey ===
Event	Gold	Silver	Bronze
Men's tournament	Chile; Agustín Araya; Agustín Amoroso; Agustín Valenzuela; Alexei De Witt; Álvaro García; José Hurtado; José Marchant; José Maldonado; Juan Amoroso; Julián Villanueva; Kay Gesswein; Luis Valenzuela; Nils Strabucchi; Sebastián Alarcón; Vicente Goñi; Vicente Gabilondo	Venezuela; Anderson Pastor; Andy Herrera; Cristián Vargas; Cristián Gómez; Dixson Abreu; Elían Jiménez; Gilber Aguilar; Heliber López; Jesús Salazar; Jhonny De La Torres; Nelson Álvarez; Rafael Salazar; Raudin Simanca; Simón Carrera; Yanier Velasquez; Yeiver López	Peru; Abel Romero; Adrián Huanca; Ángel Delgado; Angelov Contreras; Camilo Cotrina; Darwin Chávez; Diego Chipana; Fernando Aldana; Gianfranco Curo; Irvin Cekani; Jefferson Arcos; Manuel Barco; Matías Cáceres; Renzo Huacchillo; Rodrigo Díaz; Sebastián Dennison
Women's tournament	Chile; Antonia Sáez; Antonia Morales; Beatriz Wirth; Constanza Muñoz; Constanza Palma; Denise Rojas; Fernanda Flores; Fernanda Arrieta; Fernanda Villagrán; Manuela Urroz; María De las Heras; María Miranda; María Valenzuela; María Filipek; Paula Valdivia; Valentina Pérez	Paraguay; Abril Sanabria; Agustina Ramos; Astrid Duarte; Bella López; Bianca Lagraña; Larissa Barreto; María Florentín; Mia Barreto; Micaela Gómez; Pamela Benítez; Paula Pistilli; Sofía Caballero; Valeria Díaz; Vianca Maciel; Victoria Penayo; Ximena Doldán	Venezuela; Abril Marin; Deilymar González; Eva Montes; Johandri Sánchez; Julie Artigas; Luismar Báez; Maholy Hernández; María Artigas; Mariannys González; Marioska Peralta; Mery Rodríguez; Patricia Mujica; Stephanie González; Victoria Torres; Yorlani Rojas; Yurami Navas

=== Futsal ===
Event	Gold	Silver	Bronze
Men's tournament	Paraguay; Alcides Giménez; Alex López; Diego Poggi; Emerson Méndez; Enzo Udriza; Fabricio Vera; Igor Insfran; Luciano Ortiz; Marcio Ramírez; Marcos Solís; Oscar Martínez; Roberto Gamarra	Panama; Abdiel Ortiz; Alfonso Maquensi; Ángel Sánchez; Austin Plaza; Eduardo Murillo; Ian Castillo; Jaime Peñaloza; Jesús Santos; Oscar Hinks; Ricardo Castillo; Ruman Milord; Yail García	Colombia; Andrés Matos; Angelo Santofimio; Diego Ortiz; Jeiner Galindo; Jeison Padilla; Jorge Cuervo; José Sánchez; Luis Ramírez; Ronald Solorzano; Sebastián Sánchez; Sebastián Toro; Yairon Palencia

=== Golf ===
Event	Gold	Silver	Bronze
Men's individual	Manuel Torres; Venezuela	Gabriel Morgan; Chile	Guillermo Pumarol; Dominican Republic
Women's individual	María José Marín; Colombia	Mariana Mesones; Peru	Vanessa Gilly; Venezuela
Mixed team	Venezuela; José Ramírez; Manuel Torres; Vanessa Gilly	Colombia; Carlos Ardila; Felipe Álvarez; María José Marín; Silvia Garces	Peru; Luisamaria Mesones; María Salinas; Patrick Sparks; Tiago Ledgard

=== Judo ===
Event	Gold	Silver	Bronze
Men's -60 kg	Juan Pablo Ayala; Ecuador	Mateo Ortiz; Paraguay	Bernabé Vergara; Panama
Men's -60 kg	Juan Pablo Ayala; Ecuador	Mateo Ortiz; Paraguay	Erick Saraza; Peru
Men's -66 kg	Jonathan Benavides; Ecuador	Willis García; Venezuela	Heriberto Amadis; Dominican Republic
Men's -66 kg	Jonathan Benavides; Ecuador	Willis García; Venezuela	Mateo Condor; Peru
Men's -73 kg	Maikor Louis; Dominican Republic	Andrés Pariche; Venezuela	Alfredo Valdivieso; Ecuador
Men's -73 kg	Maikor Louis; Dominican Republic	Andrés Pariche; Venezuela	Ronal González; Panama
Men's -81 kg	Medickson del Orbe; Dominican Republic	Jorge Pérez; Chile	Luis Pariche; Venezuela
Men's -81 kg	Medickson del Orbe; Dominican Republic	Jorge Pérez; Chile	Alexis Harrison; Panama
Men's -90 kg	Robert Florentino; Dominican Republic	Daniel Paz; Colombia	Jonhelius Patete; Venezuela
Men's -90 kg	Robert Florentino; Dominican Republic	Daniel Paz; Colombia	Franco Arismendi; Chile
Men's 100 kg	Francisco Balanta; Colombia	Thomas Briceño; Chile	Samuel Corzo; Venezuela
Men's 100 kg	Francisco Balanta; Colombia	Thomas Briceño; Chile	Oscar Santana; Dominican Republic
Men's +100 kg	Francisco Solís; Chile	José Nova; Dominican Republic	Sandy Caraballo; Uruguay
Men's +100 kg	Francisco Solís; Chile	José Nova; Dominican Republic	Luis Amezquita; Venezuela
Women's -48 kg	Nemesis Candelo; Panama	Erika Lasso; Colombia	Gabriela Miranda; Venezuela
Women's -48 kg	Nemesis Candelo; Panama	Erika Lasso; Colombia	Erika Jara; Ecuador
Women's -52 kg	Leomaris Ruiz; Venezuela	Thalia Gamarra; Peru	Lilian Cordones; Panama
Women's -52 kg	Leomaris Ruiz; Venezuela	Thalia Gamarra; Peru	Samantha Josefa; Dominican Republic
Women's -57 kg	Astrid Gavidia; Ecuador	Audreys Pacheco; Venezuela	María Villalba; Colombia
Women's -57 kg	Astrid Gavidia; Ecuador	Audreys Pacheco; Venezuela	Driulys Rivas; Peru
Women's -63 kg	Anriquelis Barrios; Venezuela	Cindy Mera; Colombia	Hilary Lam; Peru
Women's -63 kg	Anriquelis Barrios; Venezuela	Cindy Mera; Colombia	Marcela Alfaro; Chile
Women's -70 kg	Celinda Corozo; Ecuador	Luisa Bonilla; Colombia	Eliana Aguiar; Venezuela
Women's -70 kg	Celinda Corozo; Ecuador	Luisa Bonilla; Colombia	Xsara Morales; Peru
Women's -78 kg	Zunilda Chávez; Venezuela	Brenda Olaya; Colombia	Camila Figueroa; Peru
Women's -78 kg	Zunilda Chávez; Venezuela	Brenda Olaya; Colombia	Eiraima Silvestre; Dominican Republic
Women's +78 kg	Karen León; Venezuela	Brigitte Carabalí; Colombia	Not awarded
Mixed team shaiai	Venezuela; Andrés Pariche; Anriquelis Barrios; Audreys Pacheco; Eliana Aguiar; Jonhelius Patete; Karen León; Luis Pariche; Samuel Corzo	Colombia; Brenda Olaya; Brigitte Carabalí; Cindy Mera; Daniel Paz; Duvan Nieto; Francisco Balanta; Luisa Bonilla; María Villalba	Peru; Camila Figueroa; Daryl Yamamoto; Driulys Rivas; Manuel Barthe; Mateo Condor; Roberto Galarreta; Xsara Morales
Mixed team shaiai	Venezuela; Andrés Pariche; Anriquelis Barrios; Audreys Pacheco; Eliana Aguiar; Jonhelius Patete; Karen León; Luis Pariche; Samuel Corzo	Colombia; Brenda Olaya; Brigitte Carabalí; Cindy Mera; Daniel Paz; Duvan Nieto; Francisco Balanta; Luisa Bonilla; María Villalba	Dominican Republic; Creymalin Vález; Eiraima Silvestre; Esmeralda Damiano; José Nova; Maikor Louis; Medickson del Orbe; Robert Florentino; Samantha Josefa
Mixed katame no kata	Peru; Dilmer Calle; Julio Cusi	Colombia; Laura Jaramillo; Pamela Hernández	Venezuela; Jender Guevara; Jesús Farías
Mixed kime no kata	Peru; Dilmer Calle; Julio Cusi	Colombia; Cristian Ortiz; Junior Hernández	Venezuela; Henry Vargas; Jellyfel Guevara
Mixed nage no kata	Colombia; Andrés Restrepo; Edwin Gómez	Venezuela; Ángel Maiz; Jender Guevara	Peru; Flor Zambrano; Luciana Julca

=== Karate ===
Event	Gold	Silver	Bronze
Men's -60 kg	Juan Forero; Colombia	Enrique Villalón; Chile	Wilmer Pérez; Venezuela
Men's -60 kg	Juan Forero; Colombia	Enrique Villalón; Chile	Luis Vera; Bolivia
Men's -60 kg	Juan Forero; Colombia	Enrique Villalón; Chile	Daiver Larrosa; Uruguay
Men's -67 kg	Alan Miquelena; Venezuela	Juan Pita; Uruguay	Ramphy Báez; Dominican Republic
Men's -67 kg	Alan Miquelena; Venezuela	Kurt García; Peru	Alberto Gálvez; Panama
Men's -75 kg	Juan Landázuri; Colombia	Allan Maldonado; Guatemala	Amir Rodríguez; Bolivia
Men's -75 kg	Juan Landázuri; Colombia	Allan Maldonado; Guatemala	Francisco Barrios; Uruguay
Men's -75 kg	Juan Landázuri; Colombia	Allan Maldonado; Guatemala	Gonzalo Cuadros; Peru
Men's -84 kg	José Acevedo; Ecuador	Rubén Henao; Colombia	Anderson Soriano; Dominican Republic
Men's -84 kg	José Acevedo; Ecuador	Rubén Henao; Colombia	Juan Macedo; Uruguay
Men's -84 kg	José Acevedo; Ecuador	Rubén Henao; Colombia	José Valdivia; Peru
Men's +84 kg	Iván Britos; Paraguay	Crixon Guzmán; Venezuela	Adoni Montero; Dominican Republic
Men's +84 kg	Iván Britos; Paraguay	Crixon Guzmán; Venezuela	César Vallejo; Ecuador
Men's team kumite	Colombia; Juan Forero; Juan Landázuri; Rubén Henao	Venezuela; Alan Miquelena; Crixon Guzmán; Freddy Valera; Juan Cubero; Wilmer Pérez	Chile; Daniel Manríquez; Enrique Villalón; Jorge Bravo; Sebastián Dodero
Men's team kumite	Colombia; Juan Forero; Juan Landázuri; Rubén Henao	Venezuela; Alan Miquelena; Crixon Guzmán; Freddy Valera; Juan Cubero; Wilmer Pérez	Dominican Republic; Adoni Montero; Aldhair Zabala; Anderson Soriano; Jaime Teruel; Ramphy Báez
Men's individual kata	Cleiver Casanova; Venezuela	Alejandro Ramírez; Colombia	Larry Aracena; Dominican Republic
Men's individual kata	Cleiver Casanova; Venezuela	Alejandro Ramírez; Colombia	Fernando Calderón; Guatemala
Men's team kata	Colombia; Alejandro Ramírez; Danny Díaz; Samuel Giraldo	Venezuela; Jorge Durán; Luis Rojas; Miguel Galindo	Dominican Republic; Heriberto de Castro; Jaime Teruel; Larry Aracena
Men's team kata	Colombia; Alejandro Ramírez; Danny Díaz; Samuel Giraldo	Venezuela; Jorge Durán; Luis Rojas; Miguel Galindo	Peru; Gonzalo Miura; José Morales; Mariano Wong
Women's -50 kg	Yorgelis Salazar; Venezuela	Lili Alvarado; Ecuador	Sofía Cárdenas; Colombia
Women's -50 kg	Yorgelis Salazar; Venezuela	Lili Alvarado; Ecuador	Sofía Orantes; El Salvador
Women's -55 kg	Bárbara Pérez; Venezuela	Sofía Gómez; Peru	Valentyna Volodymrivna; Jamaica
Women's -55 kg	Bárbara Pérez; Venezuela	Sofía Gómez; Peru	Ámbar García; Dominican Republic
Women's -55 kg	Bárbara Pérez; Venezuela	Sofía Gómez; Peru	Llanka Valdivia; Chile
Women's -61 kg	Claudymar Garcés; Venezuela	Alexandra Grande; Peru	Natalia Bernal; Colombia
Women's -61 kg	Claudymar Garcés; Venezuela	Alexandra Grande; Peru	Penélope Polanco; Dominican Republic
Women's -68 kg	Wendy Mosquera; Colombia	Marianth Cuervo; Venezuela	Renata Nieto; Bolivia
Women's -68 kg	Wendy Mosquera; Colombia	Marianth Cuervo; Venezuela	Karen Madera; Dominican Republic
Women's +68 kg	Valeria Echever; Ecuador	Oriana Rodríguez; Venezuela	Carla Dorado; Bolivia
Women's +68 kg	Valeria Echever; Ecuador	Oriana Rodríguez; Venezuela	Gianella Lozano; Peru
Women's team kumite	Venezuela; Bárbara Pérez; Claudymar Garcés; Marianth Cuervo; Oriana Rodríguez; Yorgelis Salazar	Colombia; Natalia Bernal; Sofía Cárdenas; Wendy Mosquera	Chile; Fernanda Vega; Llanka Valdivia; Valentina Vega
Women's team kumite	Venezuela; Bárbara Pérez; Claudymar Garcés; Marianth Cuervo; Oriana Rodríguez; Yorgelis Salazar	Colombia; Natalia Bernal; Sofía Cárdenas; Wendy Mosquera	Bolivia; Ariane Monje; Carla Dorado; Luz Marlhin; Melani Unzueta; Renata Nieto
Women's individual kata	Valentina Zapata; Colombia	Daniela García; Venezuela	Isidora Gallo; Chile
Women's individual kata	Valentina Zapata; Colombia	Daniela García; Venezuela	Ingrid Aranda; Peru
Women's team kata	Colombia; Anyi Montes; Leidy Castaño; Sara Cardona	Peru; Rosa Almarza; Saida Salcedo; Sol Romani	Venezuela; Isabella López; María Piovoso; Salma Khattar

=== Kickboxing ===
Event	Gold	Silver	Bronze
Men's -54 kg	Kenny Bellido; Peru	Cristian Chávez; Guatemala	Cristofer Brizuela; Venezuela
Men's -57 kg	Guillermo Holgado; Peru	César Rodas; Guatemala	Ángel Martínez; Venezuela
Men's -57 kg	Guillermo Holgado; Peru	César Rodas; Guatemala	Samuel Díaz; Panama
Men's -63.5 kg	Harry Huaman; Peru	Luis Lugo; Venezuela	Pablo Deleon; El Salvador
Men's -71 kg	Henry Siquihua; Peru	Joel Vasquez; Venezuela	Adrián Athanasiades; Panama
Women's -48 kg	Nieves Ramírez; Peru	Onexire Mendoza; Venezuela	Karla Zelada; El Salvador
Women's -48 kg	Nieves Ramírez; Peru	Onexire Mendoza; Venezuela	Yanissa Castrellón; Panama
Women's -52 kg	Yasmín Henríquez; El Salvador	Claudia Marmanilla; Peru	Annabella Jaspe; Venezuela
Women's -52 kg	Yasmín Henríquez; El Salvador	Claudia Marmanilla; Peru	Isabella Morales; Guatemala
Women's -56 kg	Mavet Yupanqui; Peru	Duliannys Sánchez; Venezuela	Váleri Castañeda; Guatemala
Women's -60 kg	Krissia Delgado; El Salvador	Ana Medina; Peru	Sheila Falcón; Venezuela

=== Handball ===
Event	Gold	Silver	Bronze
Men's tournament	Chile; Arian Delgado; Camilo Hernández; Danilo Salgado; Dante Cabrera; Emilio Maulén; Esteban Menanteau; Fernando Castillo; Francisco Latorre; Gaspar Serrano; Javier Frelijj; José Cárcamo; Maximiliano Caro; Rodolfo Huaracán; Samuel Moreno	Paraguay; Ángel Marecos; Arnaldo González; Carlos Samaniego; Diango Viana; Edgar Arias; Ever Salinas; Jorge Rojas; José Mendoza; Lucas Nuñez; Luis Franco; Marco Saucedo Matías Chávez; Nelson Martínez; Santiago Talavera	Dominican Republic; Darlin Pérez; Erick Montero; Francis De La Cruz; Heriberto Meriño; Joaquin De La Cruz; Jorge Soto; Jorge Manzanillo; Julio Alcantara; Luis Objio; Luis Tejeda; Maykol Beras; Ricardo Hernández; Samuel Santana; Willy Montilla

=== Modern pentathlon ===
Event	Gold	Silver	Bronze
Men's individual	Andrés Fernández; Guatemala	Juan Alberto Ochoa; Guatemala	Albert Rivas; Venezuela
Women's individual	Sofía Cabrera; Guatemala	Paula Valencia; Guatemala	María Naranjo; Ecuador
Mixed relay	Guatemala; Andrés Fernández; Sofía Cabrera	Ecuador; Bayardo Naranjo; María Naranjo	Venezuela; Albert Rivas; Osmaidy Arias

=== Mountain biking ===
Event	Gold	Silver	Bronze
Men's olympic XCO	Iván López; Colombia	Max Loa; Peru	Edson Serrano; Peru
Women's olympic XCO	Ana Roa; Colombia	Diana Pinilla; Colombia	Michela Molina; Ecuador

=== Open water swimming ===
Event	Gold	Silver	Bronze
Men's 5 km	David Farinango; Ecuador	Estebán Enderica; Ecuador	Diego Vera; Venezuela
Men's 10 km	Estebán Enderica; Ecuador	David Farinango; Ecuador	Diego Vera; Venezuela
Women's 5 km	Danna Martínez; Ecuador	Karen Coello; Ecuador	Yanci Vanegas; Guatemala
Women's 10 km	Danna Martínez; Ecuador	Karen Coello; Ecuador	Daniela Suárez; Venezuela

=== Rhythmic gymnastics ===
Event	Gold	Silver	Bronze
Individual all-around	Oriana Viñas; Colombia	Jimena Dominguez; Venezuela	Mayte Guzman; Bolivia
Team all-around	Colombia; Emiliana Vargas; Natalia Dreszer; Oriana Viñas	Venezuela; Alejandra Montilla; Jimena Dominguez; Luciana Caraballo	Peru; Abigail Corne; Lucerito Vargas; Sofía Lay; Valeria Cumpa
Hoop	Jimena Dominguez; Venezuela	Oriana Viñas; Colombia	Emiliana Vargas; Colombia
Ball	Jimena Dominguez; Venezuela	Mayte Guzman; Bolivia	Oriana Viñas; Colombia
Clubs	Jimena Dominguez; Venezuela	Oriana Viñas; Colombia	Mayte Guzman; Bolivia
Ribbon	Jimena Dominguez; Venezuela	Oriana Viñas; Colombia	Mayte Guzman; Bolivia
Group all-around	Venezuela; Camila Campos; Gabriela Rodríguez; Kaily Ramírez; María Escobar; Mariana Dona; Samantha Rojas	Chile; Annalena Ley; Antonia Gallegos; Isabel Lozano; Josefina Romero; Martina Inostroza; Martina Espejo	Colombia; Ashlee Patiño; Karen Duarte; Kizzy Rivas; Natalia Jiménez; Paula Flechas
5 ribbons	Venezuela; Camila Campos; Gabriela Rodríguez; Kaily Ramírez; María Escobar; Mariana Dona; Samantha Rojas	Chile; Annalena Ley; Antonia Gallegos; Isabel Lozano; Josefina Romero; Martina Inostroza; Martina Espejo	Guatemala; Isabella Barreda; Leslie Porras; María Villatoro; Nora Ramírez; Sofía Cali
3 balls + 2 hoops	Chile; Annalena Ley; Antonia Gallegos; Isabel Lozano; Josefina Romero; Martina Inostroza; Martina Espejo	Colombia; Ashlee Patiño; Karen Duarte; Kizzy Rivas; Natalia Jiménez; Paula Flechas	Guatemala; Isabella Barreda; Leslie Porras; María Villatoro; Nora Ramírez; Sofía Cali

=== Road cycling ===
Event	Gold	Silver	Bronze
Men's road race	Leangel Linarez; Venezuela	Jonathan Caicedo; Ecuador	Francisco Kotsakis; Chile
Men's time trial	Walter Vargas; Colombia	Jonathan Caicedo; Ecuador	Héctor Quintana; Chile
Women's road race	Juliana Londoño; Colombia	Lina Hernández; Colombia	Diana Peñuela; Colombia
Women's time trial	Diana Peñuela; Colombia	Lina Hernández; Colombia	Lilibeth Chacón; Venezuela

=== Rowing ===
Event	Gold	Silver	Bronze
Men's single sculls	Ignacio Abraham; Chile	Vincenzo Giurfa; Peru	Bruno Cetraro; Uruguay
Men's single sculls	Ignacio Abraham; Chile	Vincenzo Giurfa; Peru	Jackson Vicent; Venezuela
Men's double sculls	Uruguay; Leandro Rodas; Martín Zocalo	Venezuela; Ali Leiva; Jaime Machado	Peru; Johann Hamann; Salvatore Salprieto
Men's double sculls	Chile; Marcelo oo Nahuel Reyes	Venezuela; Ali Leiva; Jaime Machado	Peru; Johann Hamann; Salvatore Salprieto
Men's coxless pair	Chile; Alfredo Abraham; Andoni Habash	Uruguay; Felipe Klüver; Luciano García	Paraguay; Javier Insfran; Nicolás Villalba
Men's coxless pair	Chile; Alfredo Abraham; Andoni Habash	Venezuela; Ali Leiva; Argenis Rivero	Paraguay; Javier Insfran; Nicolás Villalba
Men's lightweight single sculls	Felipe Klüver; Uruguay	Andre Mora; Venezuela	César Cipriani; Peru
Men's lightweight single sculls	Ignacio Vásquez; Dominican Republic	Andre Mora; Venezuela	César Cipriani; Peru
Men's lightweight double sculls	Venezuela; César Amaris; José Guipe	Dominican Republic; Ignacio Vásquez; Wilson Restituyo	Chile; Juan Pablo Peña; Tomás Muñoz
Men's lightweight quadruple sculls	Venezuela; Andre Mora; César Amaris; Jonas Díaz; José Guipe	Paraguay; Alberto Portillo; Gonzalo Díaz; Lucas Monges; Matías Ramírez	Peru; Augusto Arbulu; César Cipriani; Matías Cabizza; Sebastián Farfan
Men's lightweight coxless pair	Venezuela; César Amaris; Andre Mora	Chile; Felipe Guerra; Manuel Fernández	Paraguay; Alberto Portillo; Matías Ramírez
Women's single sculls	Alejandra Alonso; Paraguay	Adriana Sanguineti; Peru	Wendy Simo; Dominican Republic
Women's double sculls	Paraguay; Agustina López; Fiorela Rodríguez	Peru; Alessia Palacios; Valeria Palacios	Chile; Camila Cofré; Emilia Liewald
Women's coxless pair	Peru; Adriana Sanguineti; Pamela Noya	Paraguay; Agustina López; Alejandra Alonso	Uruguay; Nicole Yarzón; Romina Cetraro
Women's coxless pair	Peru; Adriana Sanguineti; Pamela Noya	Paraguay; Agustina López; Alejandra Alonso	Venezuela; Jenesis Pérez; Luisa Rodríguez
Women's lightweight single sculls	Valeria Palacios; Peru	Romina Cetraro; Uruguay	Kimberlin Meneses; Venezuela
Women's lightweight single sculls	Valeria Palacios; Peru	Adriana Sanabria; Paraguay	Kimberlin Meneses; Venezuela
Women's lightweight double sculls	Paraguay; Adriana Sanarbia; Rocío Bordón	Peru; Alessia Palacios; Valería Palacios	Venezuela; Keyla García; Kimberlin Meneses
Women's lightweight quadruple sculls	Paraguay; Adriana Sanarbia; Ada Rodríguez; Clara Correa; Rocío Bordón	Peru; Alessia Palacios; Valería Palacios; Luciana Zegarra; Pamela Noya	Venezuela; Keyla García; Kimberlin Meneses; Scarlet Álvarez; Ysmaly Granadino
Women's lightweight coxless pair	Peru; Alessia Palacios; Valería Palacios	Paraguay; Adriana Sanarbia; Rocío Bordón	Venezuela; Keyla García; Scarlet Álvarez
Mixed quadruple sculls	Uruguay; Bruno Cetraro; Marcos Sarraute; Nicole Yarzon; Romina Cetraro	Chile; Alfredo Abraham; Andoni Habash; Christina Hostetter; Filipa Rosas	Venezuela; Jenesis Pérez; Junior Pérez; Luisa Rodríguez; Nick Utrera
Mixed quadruple sculls	Paraguay; Agustina López; Alejandra Alonso; Javier Insfran; Nicolás Villalba	Chile; Alfredo Abraham; Andoni Habash; Christina Hostetter; Filipa Rosas	Venezuela; Jenesis Pérez; Junior Pérez; Luisa Rodríguez; Nick Utrera

=== Rugby sevens ===
Event	Gold	Silver	Bronze
Men's tournament	Chile; Álvaro Castro; Antonio Corbella; Clemente Armstrong; Diego Warnken; Ernesto Tchimino; Federico Kennedy; Gonzalo Lara; Juan Bianchi; Julián Troncoso; Luca Strabucchi; Nicolás Saab; Rodrigo Araya	Colombia; Alain Altahona; Alejandro Guisao; Andrés Mosquera; Andrés Tellez; Daniel Villa; Daniel Gomez; Diver Ceballos; Jhojan Ortiz; Jhon Urrutia; Juan Romero; Juan Agudelo; Luis Giraldo	Venezuela; Adrián Madriz; Asdrubal Figueroa; Carlos Herrera; Derwin Gonzalez; Eifrenyer Liñan; Francisco Gallardo; Gustavo Carreño; Jackson Davila; Jefferson Dávila; Jhonnaiker Hernandez; Josue Romero; Samir Abache
Women's tournament	Colombia; Angie Manyoma; Daniela Alzate; Eva Pino; Heidy Acalo; Isabella Saldarriaga; Jocelin Agredo; Juliana Soto; Leidy Soto; Madi Cordoba; Maria Lopera; Valentina Tapias; Valeria Muñoz	Paraguay; Araceli Nicolini; Ingrid Alfonso; Jacqueline Velaztiqui; Liz Romero; Lucero Viveros; Maria Gauto; Mirian Ramos; Natalia Mendez; Perla RoavSamaria Sanguinetti; Sofia Armoa; Viviana Silva	Peru; Ana Senosain; Astrid Nuñez; Camila García; Gabriela Julve; Jenniffer Lopez; Judith Mena; Lisbeth Salcedo; Lucyangeles Flores; Maria Connearn; Maria Chuquivala; Marita Muñoz; Thais Velit

=== Sailing ===
Event	Gold	Silver	Bronze
Men's ILCA-7	Stefano Peschiera; Peru	Renzo Sanguineti; Peru	Andrey Quintero; Colombia
Men's IQFOIL	José Estredo; Venezuela	Bruno Mendoza; Peru	Samuel Pérez; Dominican Republic
Men's sunfish	David Hernández; Guatemala	Jean De Trazegnies; Peru	Simon Gómez; Colombia
Women's ILCA-6	Florencia Chiarella; Peru	Caterina Romero; Peru	Cristina Castellanos; Guatemala
Women's sunfish	Adriana Barron; Peru	Sophie Zimmermann; Peru	Daniela Rivera; Venezuela
Mixed snipe	Peru; Ismael Muelle; María Vegas	Ecuador; Alisson Haón; Jonathan Martinetti	Chile; Matías Poncell; Trinidad Prieto

=== Shooting ===
Event	Gold	Silver	Bronze
Men's 10 metre air pistol	Fernando Pozo; Ecuador	Diego Parra; Chile	Yautung Cueva; Ecuador
Men's 10 metre air pistol team	Peru; José Ullilen; Kevin Altamirano; Marko Carrillo	Colombia; Armando Gómez; Juan Sebastián Rivera; Sebastián Sánchez	Venezuela; Diego Oduber; Douglas Gómez; Rafael Ochoa
Men's standard pistol	Marko Carrillo; Peru	Brian Rodríguez; Peru	Rudolf Knijnenburg; Bolivia
Men's standard pistol team	Peru; Bérlan Rodríguez; Kevin Altamirano; Marko Carrillo	Venezuela; Diego Oduber; Douglas Gómez De Freitas; Douglas Gómez Salazar	El Salvador; Jorge Omentel; José Gutiérrez; Justin Trujillo
Men's rapid fire pistol	Bérlan Rodríguez; Peru	Marko Carrillo; Peru	Douglas Gómez Salazar; Venezuela
Men's rapid fire pistol team	Peru; Bérlan Rodríguez; Kevin Altamirano; Marko Carrillo	Venezuela; Diego Oduber; Douglas Gómez De Freitas; Douglas Gómez Salazar	El Salvador; Jorge Omentel; José Gutiérrez; Justin Trujillo
Men's 10 metre air rifle	Daniel Vidal; Chile	Israel Gutiérrez; El Salvador	Diego Morín; Peru
Men's 10 metre air rifle team	El Salvador; Diego Santamaria; Israel Gutiérrez; Juan Pineda	Peru; Daniel Vizcarra; Diego Morín; Favio Salas	Colombia; Carlos Hernández; Iván López; Pedro Velasco
Men's 50 metre rifle 3 positions	Douglas Oliva; Guatemala	Daniel Vizcarra; Peru	Cristóbal Robles; Chile
Men's 50 metre rifle 3 positions team	Peru; Daniel Vizcarra; Diego Morín; Miguel Mejía	Colombia; Carlos Hernández; Iván López; Pedro Velasco	Venezuela; Aníbal Pérez; Julio Iemma; Santiago Niño
Men's 50 metre rifle prone	Cristóbal Robles; Chile	Daniel Vizcarra; Peru	Julio Iemma; Venezuela
Men's 50 metre rifle prone team	Peru; Daniel Vizcarra; Diego Morín; Miguel Mejía	Colombia; Carlos Hernández; Iván López; Pedro Velasco	Venezuela; Aníbal Pérez; Julio Iemma; Santiago Niño
Men's skeet	Nicolás Pacheco; Peru	Diego Bermúdez; Guatemala	Héctor Flores; Chile
Men's skeet team	Guatemala; Carlos Padilla; Diego Bermúdez; Santiago Romero	Peru; Flavio Artoni; Marco Matellini; Nicolás Pacheco	Dominican Republic; Julio Dujarric; Máximo Tavarez; Stefano Hazoury
Men's trap	Leonel Martínez; Venezuela	Alessandro de Souza; Peru	Mario Soares; Venezuela
Men's trap team	Peru; Alessandro de Souza; Asier Cilloniz; Francisco Boza	Colombia; Esteban Caro; Hernando Vega; Pedro Gutiérrez	Venezuela; Gabriele Evangelista; Leonel Martínez; Mario Soares
Women's 25 metre pistol	Diana Durango; Ecuador	Andrea Pérez; Ecuador	Brianda Rivera; Peru
Women's 25 metre pistol team	Peru; Brianda Rivera; Claudia Sánchez; Liz Carrión	El Salvador; Frida Aguilar; Lilian Castro; Milena Morales	Venezuela; Maribel Pineda; Nicole Saavedra; Verónica Lozada
Women's 10 metre air pistol	Juana Rueda; Colombia	Liz Carrión; Peru	Deysi Jilapa; Peru
Women's 10 metre air rifle	Gloria Rivas; Guatemala	Polymaría Velásquez; Guatemala	Alexia Arenas; Peru
Women's 10 metre air rifle team	Guatemala; Gloria Rivas; Ingrid Vela; Polymaría Velásquez	Peru; Alexia Arenas; Micaela Arenas; Sara Vizcarra	El Salvador; Johanna Pineda; Natalia Guardado; Verónica Rivas
Women's 50 metre rifle 3 positions	Ingrid Vela; Guatemala	Polymaría Velásquez; Guatemala	Alexia Arenas; Peru
Women's 50 metre rifle prone	Ingrid Vela; Guatemala	Sara Vizcarra; Peru	Verónica Rivas; El Salvador
Women's skeet	Daniella Borda; Peru	Emily Padilla; Guatemala	María Soto; Guatemala
Women's trap	Stefanie Goetzke; Guatemala	Valentina Porcella; Peru	Ana Soto; Guatemala
Mixed 10 metre air pistol	Venezuela; Rafael Ochoa; Verónica Lozada	Ecuador; Diana Durango; Fernando Pozo	Ecuador; Andrea Pérez; Yautung Cueva
Mixed 10 metre air rifle	Peru; Alexia Arenas; Diego Morín	Guatemala; Douglas Oliva; Polymaría Velásquez	Guatemala; Allan Márquez; Gloria Rivas
Mixed skeet	Guatemala; Diego Bermúdez; Emily Padilla	Peru; Daniella Borda; Nicolás Pacheco	Panamá; Eduardo Taylor; Patricia González
Mixed trap	Peru; Alessandro de Souza; Valentina Porcella	Guatemala; Ana Soto; Carlos Hernández	Guatemala; Hebert Brol; Stefanie Goetzke

=== Skateboarding ===
Event	Gold	Silver	Bronze
Men's park	Martín Jaque; Chile	Raphael Scheelje; Peru	Mateo Moreno; Colombia
Men's street	Ángelo Caro; Peru	Jhancarlos González; Colombia	Matías Floto; Chile
Women's park	Ignacia Muñoz; Chile	Domenica Ríos; Peru	Nico Russi; Colombia
Women's street	Jazmín Álvarez; Colombia	Valentina Paz; Chile	Kiara Oropeza; Peru

=== Softball ===
Event	Gold	Silver	Bronze
Women's tournament	Venezuela; Bailey Olerich; Daryelin Rivas; Diana Arcay; Eila Infante; Freymar Suniaga; Irene Rabasco; Jairimar Pulido; Kendal Lunar; Kisbel Vizcaya; Loreley Linares; Michelle Floyd; Rachael Schumann; Verónica Antequera; Yakary Molina; Yalianni Alvarado; Yulexis Barrios	Peru; Adriana Yamakawa; Allison Morales; Amina Larry; Brunella Vílchez; Carla Lobatón; Emily Paiva; Itati Susano; Kiana Kadena; Luciana Chávez; María Elías; María Pizarro; Nicole Gooden; Romina Cerna; Valeria Higa; Wendoly Santa Cruz; Xiomara Llerena	Dominican Republic; Anabel Ulloa; Atalyia Rijo; Brianna Estevez; Cauris Rincón; Claudia Santana; Eduarda Rocha; Emmy Segura; Felicia Agramonte; Jayla Santana; Jelina Medina; Katherine Sugilio; Marianny Guante; Massiel Heredia; Sidney Araujo; Yanela Gómez; Yissel Sánchez

=== Speed skating ===
Event	Gold	Silver	Bronze
Men's 1000 metres sprint	Jhon Tascon; Colombia	Juan Mantilla; Colombia	Gabriel Reyes; Chile
Men's 10,000 metres elimination race	Gabriel Reyes; Chile	Juan Mantilla; Colombia	Julio Mirena; Paraguay
Men's 200 metres time trial	Faberson Bonilla; Guatemala	Jhon Tascon; Colombia	Ricardo Verdugo; Chile
Men's 500 metres + distance	Jhon Tascon; Colombia	Ricardo Verdugo; Chile	José Rojas; Venezuela
Women's 1000 metres sprint	Kollin Castro; Colombia	Gabriela Vargas; Ecuador	Ivonne Nóchez; El Salvador
Women's 10,000 metres elimination race	Gabriela Vargas; Ecuador	Luz Garzón; Colombia	Macarena Vásquez; Chile
Women's 200 metres time trial	Ivonne Nóchez; El Salvador	Kollin Castro; Colombia	María Arias; Ecuador
Women's 500 metres + distance	Kollin Castro; Colombia	María Arias; Ecuador	Ivonne Nóchez; El Salvador

=== Squash ===
Event	Gold	Silver	Bronze
Men's singles	Junior Enríquez; Guatemala	Ronald Palomino; Colombia	Francesco Giménez; Paraguay
Men's singles	Junior Enríquez; Guatemala	Ronald Palomino; Colombia	Edwin Enríquez; Guatemala
Men's doubles	Peru; Alonso Escudero; Rafael Gálvez	Guatemala; Edwin Enríquez; Junior Enríquez	Colombia; Andrés Herrera; Edgar Ramírez
Men's doubles	Peru; Alonso Escudero; Rafael Gálvez	Guatemala; Edwin Enríquez; Junior Enríquez	Ecuador; Álvaro Buenaño; Martín Falconi
Men's team	Colombia; Andrés Herrera; Edgar Ramírez; José Santamaria; Ronald Palomino	Ecuador; Álvaro Buenaño; Antonio Vaca; Martín Falconi	Guatemala; Ángel Enríquez; Edwin Enríquez; José Toscano; Junior Enríquez
Men's team	Colombia; Andrés Herrera; Edgar Ramírez; José Santamaria; Ronald Palomino	Ecuador; Álvaro Buenaño; Antonio Vaca; Martín Falconi	Peru; Alonso Escudero; Amaro Castillo; Rafael Gálvez; Thiago Cabrejos
Women's singles	Laura Tovar; Colombia	Lucía Bautista; Colombia	Fiorella Gatti; Paraguay
Women's singles	Laura Tovar; Colombia	Lucía Bautista; Colombia	María Moya; Ecuador
Women's doubles	Colombia; Laura Tovar; Lucía Bautista	Paraguay; Fiorella Gatti; Lujan Palacios	Ecuador; María Buenaño; María Moya
Women's doubles	Colombia; Laura Tovar; Lucía Bautista	Paraguay; Fiorella Gatti; Lujan Palacios	Guatemala; Darlyn Sandoval; Tabita Gaitán
Women's team	Colombia; Laura Tovar; Lucía Bautista; María Tovar; Silvia Angulo	Ecuador; María Buenaño; María Moya	Paraguay; Ana Krauch; Belén Saavedra; Fiorella Gatti; Lujan Palacios
Women's team	Colombia; Laura Tovar; Lucía Bautista; María Tovar; Silvia Angulo	Ecuador; María Buenaño; María Moya	Chile; Ana Pinto; Giselle Delgado
Mixed doubles	Colombia; María Tovar; Ronald Palomino	Peru; Luciana Castillo; Thiago Cabrejos	Paraguay; Andrés Acosta; Belén Saavedra
Mixed doubles	Colombia; María Tovar; Ronald Palomino	Peru; Luciana Castillo; Thiago Cabrejos	Guatemala; Ana Romero; José Toscano

=== Surfing ===
Event	Gold	Silver	Bronze
Men's shortboard	Lucca Mesinas; Peru	Alonso Correa; Peru	Kai Gale; Panama
Men's longboard	Lucas Garrido Lecca; Peru	Rafael Cortez; Chile	Piccolo Clemente; Peru
Men's bodyboard	Cristopher Bayona; Peru	Edwin Núñez; Panama	Jesús Arocha; Venezuela
Men's SUP surf	Sebastián Gómez; Peru	Gabriel Salazar; Chile	Tamil Martino; Peru
Men's SUP race	Itzel Delgado; Peru	Edonays Caballero; Panama	Andrés Rodríguez-Veliz; Peru
Women's shortboard	Sol Aguirre; Peru	Mimi Barona; Ecuador	Arena Rodríguez; Peru
Women's longboard	Mafer Reyes; Peru	Margarita Conde; Colombia	Carolina Thun; Peru
Women's bodyboard	Verónica Correa; Panama	Rosmarky Álvarez; Venezuela	Solange Chía; Peru

=== Swimming ===
Event	Gold	Silver	Bronze
Men's 50 metre freestyle	Frank Solano; Colombia	Jorge Otaiza; Venezuela	Luis Toledo; Chile
Men's 100 metre freestyle	Denis Pérez; Venezuela	Emil Pérez; Venezuela	Cardenio Fernández; Colombia
Men's 200 metre freestyle	Eduardo Cisternas; Chile	Sebastián Camacho; Colombia	Santiago Arteaga; Colombia
Men's 400 metre freestyle	Eduardo Cisternas; Chile	Sebastián Camacho; Colombia	Domenico Sotomayor; Peru
Men's 800 metre freestyle	Ronaldo Zambrano; Venezuela	Sebastián Camacho; Colombia	Gustavo Ywanaga; Peru
Men's 1500 metre freestyle	Esteban Enderica; Ecuador	Gustavo Ywanaga; Peru	Ronaldo Zambrano; Venezuela
Men's 50 metre backstroke	Gabriel Arias; Colombia	Anthony Rincón; Colombia	Charles Hockin; Paraguay
Men's 100 metre backstroke	Anthony Rincón; Colombia	Edhy Vargas; Chile	Charles Hockin; Paraguay
Men's 200 metre backstroke	Edhy Vargas; Chile	Erick Gordillo; Guatemala	César Paredes; Venezuela
Men's 50 metre breaststroke	Mariano Lazzerini; Chile	Juan García; Colombia	Jorge Murillo; Colombia
Men's 100 metre breaststroke	Mariano Lazzerini; Chile	Jorge Murillo; Colombia	Juan García; Colombia
Men's 200 metre breaststroke	Mariano Lazzerini; Chile	Vicente Villanueva; Chile	Bernhard Christianson; Panama
Men's 50 metre butterfly	Jorge Otaiza; Venezuela	Emiliano Calle; Colombia	Frank Solano; Colombia
Men's 100 metre butterfly	Jorge Otaiza; Venezuela	David Arias; Colombia	Manuel Díaz; Venezuela
Men's 200 metre butterfly	Erick Gordillo; Guatemala	David Arias; Colombia	Fernando Arce; Peru
Men's 200 metre individual medley	Erick Gordillo; Guatemala	Manuel Díaz; Venezuela	Vicente Villanueva; Chile
Men's 400 metre individual medley	Erick Gordillo; Guatemala	Esteban Enderica; Ecuador	César Paredes; Venezuela
Men's 4×100 metre freestyle relay	Venezuela; Denis Pérez; Emil Pérez; Jorge Otaiza; Manuel Díaz	Chile; Eduardo Cisternas; Felipe Baffico; Luis Toledo; Mariano Lazzerini	Colombia; Cardenio Fernández; Frank Solano; Santiago Arteaga; Sebastián Camacho
Men's 4×200 metre freestyle relay	Chile; Edhy Vargas; Eduardo Cisternas; Elías Ardiles; Felipe Baffico	Colombia; Cardenio Fernández; David Arias; Santiago Arteaga; Sebastián Camacho	Venezuela; Adanuriel Rosal; Denis Pérez; Emil Pérez; Wiston Rodríguez
Men's 4×100 metre medley relay	Colombia; Anthony Rincón; Cardenio Fernández; David Arias; Jorge Murillo	Chile; Edhy Vargas; Felipe Baffico; Luis Toledo; Mariano Lazzerini	Venezuela; Denis Pérez; Eric Veit; Jorge Otaiza; Manuel Díaz
Women's 50 metre freestyle	Lismar Lyon; Venezuela	Sirena Rowe; Colombia	Isabella Bedoya; Colombia
Women's 100 metre freestyle	Rafaela Fernandini; Peru	Inés Marín; Chile	María Yegres; Venezuela
Women's 200 metre freestyle	María Yegres; Venezuela	Tiffany Murillo; Colombia	Paola Azzato; Venezuela
Women's 400 metre freestyle	María Yegres; Venezuela	Tiffany Murillo; Colombia	Kristel Köbrich; Chile
Women's 800 metre freestyle	Kristel Köbrich; Chile	Tiffany Murillo; Colombia	María Yegres; Venezuela
Women's 1500 metre freestyle	Kristel Köbrich; Chile	Tiffany Murillo; Colombia	Mariana Cote; Venezuela
Women's 50 metre backstroke	Laura Melo; Colombia	Carla González; Venezuela	María Contreras; Ecuador
Women's 50 metre backstroke	Laura Melo; Colombia	Carla González; Venezuela	Melissa Pierri; Guatemala
Women's 100 metre backstroke	Jazmín Pistelli; Colombia	Carla González; Venezuela	Melissa Pierri; Guatemala
Women's 200 metre backstroke	Jazmín Pistelli; Colombia	Alexia Sotomayor; Peru	Melissa Pierri; Guatemala
Women's 50 metre breaststroke	Stefanía Gómez; Colombia	Mercedes Toledo; Venezuela	Fernanda Reyes; Chile
Women's 100 metre breaststroke	Mercedes Toledo; Venezuela	Stefanía Gómez; Colombia	Laura Fingerhuth; Chile
Women's 200 metre breaststroke	Mercedes Toledo; Venezuela	Laura Fingerhuth; Chile	Sofía Choque; Peru
Women's 50 metre butterfly	Lismar Lyon; Venezuela	Sirena Rowe; Colombia	Emma Sabando; Ecuador
Women's 100 metre butterfly	Lismar Lyon; Venezuela	Samantha Baños; Colombia	Emma Sabando; Ecuador
Women's 200 metre butterfly	Samantha Baños; Colombia	Mónica Leydar; Venezuela	Yasmín Silva; Peru
Women's 200 metre individual medley	Laura Melo; Colombia	Mónica Leydar; Venezuela	María Muñoz; Peru
Women's 400 metre individual medley	Laura Melo; Colombia	Mónica Leydar; Venezuela	Mariana Cabezas; Colombia
Women's 4×100 metre freestyle relay	Colombia; Isabella Bedoya; Karen Durango; Sirena Rowe; Tiffany Murillo	Venezuela; Carla González; Fabiana Pesces; Lismar Lyon; María Yegres	Peru; Alexia Sotomayor; Lía Espinosa; Micaela Bernales; Rafaela Fernandini
Women's 4×200 metre freestyle relay	Venezuela; María Yegres; Mariana Cote; Mónica Leydar; Paola Azzato	Colombia; Jazmín Pistelli; Karen Durango; Mariana Cabezas; Tiffany Murillo	Peru; Alexa Simmons; Astrid García; Lía Espinosa; Micaela Bernales
Women's 4×100 metre medley relay	Colombia; Isabella Bedoya; Jazmín Pistelli; Karen Durango; Stefanía Gómez	Venezuela; Carla González; Lismar Lyon; María Yegres; Mercedes Toledo	Peru; Alexia Sotomayor; Emma Sims; Rafaela Fernandini; Yasmin Silva
Mixed 4×100 metre medley relay	Colombia; David Arias; Isabella Bedoya; Jazmín Pistelli; Jorge Murillo	Venezuela; Carla González; Denis Pérez; Jorge Otaiza; Mercedes Toledo	Peru; Alexia Sotomayor; Fernando Arce; Mariano Gómez; Rafaela Fernandini

=== Table tennis ===
Event	Gold	Silver	Bronze
Men's singles	Jorge Miño; Ecuador	Emanuel Otalvaro; Colombia	César Castillo; Venezuela
Men's singles	Jorge Miño; Ecuador	Emanuel Otalvaro; Colombia	Felipe Duffo; Peru
Men's doubles	Peru; Carlos Fernández; Felipe Duffo	Peru; Diego Takeda; Rodrigo García	Ecuador; Jorge Miño; Joshua Robayo
Men's doubles	Peru; Carlos Fernández; Felipe Duffo	Peru; Diego Takeda; Rodrigo García	Venezuela; Carlos Rios; Jesús Tovar
Men's team	Peru; Carlos Fernández; Diego Takeda; Felipe Duffo; Rodrigo García	Venezuela; Carlos Ríos; César Castillo; Jesús Tovar; Raimundo Medina	Ecuador; Jorge Miño; Joshua Robayo; Juan González
Men's team	Peru; Carlos Fernández; Diego Takeda; Felipe Duffo; Rodrigo García	Venezuela; Carlos Ríos; César Castillo; Jesús Tovar; Raimundo Medina	Dominican Republic; Abit Tejada; Eduardo Darley; Rafael Cabrera; Ramón Vila
Women's singles	Zhiying Zeng; Chile	Eva Brito; Dominican Republic	Sofía Vega; Chile
Women's singles	Zhiying Zeng; Chile	Eva Brito; Dominican Republic	Roxy González; Venezuela
Women's doubles	Colombia; Ana Isaza; Juliana Lozada	Chile; Judith Morales; Sofía Vega	Venezuela; Camila Obando; Roxy González
Women's doubles	Colombia; Ana Isaza; Juliana Lozada	Chile; Judith Morales; Sofía Vega	Peru; Mariagrazia Sánchez; Natzumi Aquije
Women's team	Chile; Judith Morales; Sofía Vega; Zhiying Zeng	Venezuela; Camila Obando; Cristina Gómez; Natacha Mata; Roxy González	Dominican Republic; Arianna Estrella; Esmerlin Castro; Eva Brito; Yasiris Ortíz
Mixed doubles	Chile; Álvaro Fuentes; Sofía Vega	Chile; Jorge Paredes; Zhiying Zeng	Colombia; Juliana Lozada; Sebastián Bedoya
Mixed doubles	Chile; Álvaro Fuentes; Sofía Vega	Chile; Jorge Paredes; Zhiying Zeng	Ecuador; Jorge Miño; Nathaly Paredes

=== Taekwondo ===
Event	Gold	Silver	Bronze
Men's 58 kg	Áaron Contreras; Chile	Jefferson Ochoa; Colombia	Jhoel Díaz; Venezuela
Men's 58 kg	Áaron Contreras; Chile	Jefferson Ochoa; Colombia	Franco Moreno; Peru
Men's 58 to -68 kg	Cristián Olivero; Chile	Yohandri Granado; Venezuela	Saúl Taveras; Dominican Republic
Men's 58 to -68 kg	Cristián Olivero; Chile	Yohandri Granado; Venezuela	Alejandro Castillo; Peru
Men's 68 to -80 kg	Joaquín Churchill; Chile	Miguel Trejos; Colombia	Juan Montalvo; Bolivia
Men's 68 to -80 kg	Joaquín Churchill; Chile	Miguel Trejos; Colombia	Pedro Martínez; Dominican Republic
Men's 80 kg	Luis Álvarez; Venezuela	Hassani Andrade; Peru	César Silva; Colombia
Men's 80 kg	Luis Álvarez; Venezuela	Hassani Andrade; Peru	Julio Arroyo; Ecuador
Men's individual	Rodrigo Subauste; Peru	Dany Coy; Guatemala	José Heredia; Bolivia
Men's individual	Rodrigo Subauste; Peru	Dany Coy; Guatemala	Yoan Sánchez; Dominican Republic
Men's individual freestyle	Favio Mancilla; Peru	Mario Troya; Ecuador	Taekyo Priore; Paraguay
Men's individual freestyle	Favio Mancilla; Peru	Mario Troya; Ecuador	César Aguilar; Guatemala
Men's team	Chile; Áaron Contreras; Joaquín Churchill; Cristian Olivero	Peru; Alejandro Castillo; Hassani Andrade; Franco Moreno	Colombia; David Paz; Miguel Trejos; Jefferson Ochoa
Men's team	Chile; Áaron Contreras; Joaquín Churchill; Cristian Olivero	Peru; Alejandro Castillo; Hassani Andrade; Franco Moreno	Dominican Republic; Cristofer Reyes Pie; Saúl Taveras; Pedro Martínez
Men's team freestyle	Guatemala; César Aguilar; Héctor Morales; Dany Coy	Venezuela; Aarón Bolívar; Georfrén Reyes; Bryan González	Not awarded (Peru withdrew)
Women's -49 kg	Andrea Ramírez; Colombia	Alessandra Suárez; Peru	Virginia Dellan; Venezuela
Women's -49 kg	Andrea Ramírez; Colombia	Alessandra Suárez; Peru	Karoline Castillo; Panama
Women's 49 to -57 kg	Alexmar Sulbaran; Venezuela	Camila Cáceres; Peru	Angie Prieto; Colombia
Women's 49 to -57 kg	Alexmar Sulbaran; Venezuela	Camila Cáceres; Peru	María Peña; Dominican Republic
Women's 57 to -67 kg	Mell Mina; Ecuador	Claudia Gallardo; Chile	Laura Ramírez; Colombia
Women's 57 to -67 kg	Mell Mina; Ecuador	Claudia Gallardo; Chile	María Cano; Peru
Women's +67 kg	Fernanda Aguirre; Chile	María González; Venezuela	Dayana Folleco; Ecuador
Women's +67 kg	Fernanda Aguirre; Chile	María González; Venezuela	Eliana Vasquez; Peru
Women's individual	Carmela De La Barra; Peru	Karla Ramos; Dominican Republic	Daniela Rodríguez; Panama
Women's individual	Carmela De La Barra; Peru	Karla Ramos; Dominican Republic	Erika Hernández; Guatemala
Women's individual freestyle	Alejandra Higueros; Guatemala	Katlen Jerves; Ecuador	Fernanda Melillo; Venezuela
Women's individual freestyle	Alejandra Higueros; Guatemala	Katlen Jerves; Ecuador	Alexandra Pimentel; Peru
Women's team	Peru; Alessandra Suárez; Eliana Vásquez; Camila Cáceres	Colombia; Andrea Ramírez; Laura Ramírez; Angie Prieto	Venezuela; Alexmar Sulbarán; Virginia Dellán; Hillary Clemente
Women's team	Peru; Alessandra Suárez; Eliana Vásquez; Camila Cáceres	Colombia; Andrea Ramírez; Laura Ramírez; Angie Prieto	Bolivia; Adriana Martínez; Jireh Hurtado; Daniela Daza
Women's team freestyle	Guatemala; Celia Icuté; Alejandra Higueros; Erika Hernández	Peru; Alexandra Pimentel; Fabiana Varillas; Carmela De La Barra	Venezuela; Fernanda Melillo; Oquisis Rodríguez; Ivanna Pérez
Mixed freestyle pair	Peru; Fabiana Varillas; Mateo Argomedo	Ecuador; Katlen Jerves; Mario Troya	Venezuela; Oquisis Rodríguez; Georfrén Reyes
Mixed freestyle pair	Peru; Fabiana Varillas; Mateo Argomedo	Ecuador; Katlen Jerves; Mario Troya	Guatemala; Celia Icuté; Héctor Morales

=== Tennis ===
Event	Gold	Silver	Bronze
Men's singles	Juan Pablo Varillas; Peru	Arklon Huertas del Pino; Peru	Peter Bertran; Dominican Republic
Men's doubles	Colombia; Alejandro Arcila; Juan Sebastián Gómez	Peru; Juan Pablo Varillas; Arklon Huertas del Pino	Venezuela; Brandon Pérez; Juan José Bianchi
Women's singles	Lucciana Pérez; Peru	Sofía Cabezas; Venezuela	Antonia Vergara; Chile
Women's doubles	Peru; Lucciana Pérez; Romina Ccuno	Colombia; Yuliana Lizarazo; María Paulina Pérez	Chile; Antonia Vergara; Jimar Gerald
Mixed doubles	Colombia; María Paulina Pérez; Juan Sebastián Gómez	Chile; Fernanda Labraña; Nicolás Villalón	Peru; Romina Ccuno; Arklon Huertas del Pino

=== Track cycling ===
Event	Gold	Silver	Bronze
Men's keirin	Kevin Quintero; Colombia	Cristian Ortega; Colombia	Francis Cachique; Peru
Men's keirin	Kevin Quintero; Colombia	Nicholas Paul; Trinidad and Tobago	Francis Cachique; Peru
Men's madison	Peru; Hugo Ruiz; Robimson Ruiz	Colombia; Brayan Sánchez; Juan Esteban Arango	Chile; Cristián Arriagada; Martín Mancilla
Men's omnium	Clever Martínez; Venezuela	Juan Esteban Arango; Colombia	Hugo Ruiz; Peru
Men's team pursuit	Colombia; Anderson Arboleda; Brayan Sánchez; Bryan Gómez; Juan Esteban Arango	Chile; Cristián Arriagada; Diego Rojas; Martín Mancilla; Raimundo Carvajal	Venezuela; Arlex Méndez; Edwin Torres; Franklin Chacón; Leangel Linarez
Men's sprint	Kevin Quintero; Colombia	Cristian Ortega; Colombia	Not awarded
Men's sprint	Nicholas Paul; Trinidad and Tobago	Cristian Ortega; Colombia	Not awarded
Men's team sprint	Colombia; Cristian Ortega; Kevin Quintero; Rubén Murillo	Venezuela; Alberto Torres; Hersony Canelón; Yorber Teran	Chile; Camilo Palacios; Josafat Cárdenas; Roberto Castillo
Women's keirin	Stefany Cuadrado; Colombia	Jalymar Rodríguez; Venezuela	Juliana Gaviria; Colombia
Women's keirin	Stefany Cuadrado; Colombia	Jalymar Rodríguez; Venezuela	Makaira Wallace; Trinidad and Tobago
Women's madison	Colombia; Elizabeth Castaño; Lina Hernández	Venezuela; Lilibeth Chacón; Verónica Abreu	Chile; Javiera Garrido; Scarlet Cortés
Women's omnium	Lina Hernández; Colombia	Lilibeth Chacón; Venezuela	Scarlet Cortés; Chile
Women's team pursuit	Chile; Aranza Villalón; Marlen Rojas; Paula Villalón; Scarlet Cortés	Colombia; Camila Valbuena; Elizabeth Castaño; Juliana Londoño; Lina Hernández	Venezuela; Katiuska García; Lilibeth Chacón; Olviangel Castillo; Verónica Abreu
Women's sprint	Stefany Cuadrado; Colombia	Luna Álvarez; Colombia	Paola Muñoz; Chile
Women's sprint	Stefany Cuadrado; Colombia	Makaira Wallace; Trinidad and Tobago	Paola Muñoz; Chile
Women's team sprint	Colombia; Juliana Gaviria; Stefany Cuadrado; Yarli Mosquera	Venezuela; Carleany Martínez; Jalymar Rodríguez; Olviangel Castillo	Chile; Marlen Rojas; Paola Muñoz; Paula Molina

=== Trampoline ===
Event	Gold	Silver	Bronze
Men's individual	Manuel Sierra; Colombia	Jezreel González; Venezuela	Miguel Valencia; Peru
Men's synchronized	Colombia; Manuel Sierra; Diego Giraldo	Venezuela; Alexei Tovar; Jezreel González	Bolivia; Joel Yzquierdo; Miguel Valencia
Women's individual	Nicole Castellanos; Colombia	Anny Sánchez; Colombia	Maya Quinteros; Bolivia
Women's synchronized	Colombia; Anny Sánchez; Nicole Castellanos	Bolivia; Carol Bellido; Maya Quinteros	Venezuela; Alida Rojo; Parvati Alberti
Mixed synchronized	Venezuela; Sol Lobo; Zachhdyel Montoya	Colombia; Manuel Sierra; Nicole Castellanos	Bolivia; Carol Bellido; Manuel González

=== Triathlon ===
Event	Gold	Silver	Bronze
Men's individual	Gabriel Teran; Ecuador	Mateo Mendoza; Chile	Carlos Quinchara; Colombia
Men's doubles	Ecuador; Gabriel Teran; Juan Andrade	Chile; Fernando Jacome; Mateo Mendoza	Venezuela; Luis Velásquez; Yhousman Perdomo
Women's individual	Rosa Martínez; Venezuela	Dominga Jacome; Chile	Carolina Velásquez; Colombia
Women's doubles	Venezuela; Genesis Ruiz; Rosa Martínez	Chile; Daniela Moya; Dominga Jacome	Colombia; Carolina Velásquez; Valentina Álvarez
Mixed relay	Ecuador; Gabriel Teran; Paula Jara; Juan Andrade; Elizabeth Bravo	Venezuela; Luis Velásquez; Genesis Ruiz; Yhousman Perdomo; Rosa Martínez	Chile; Daniela Moya; Fernando Jacome; Dominga Jacome; Mateo Mendoza

=== Volleyball ===
Event	Gold	Silver	Bronze
Men's tournament	Colombia; Bryan Ramos; Daniel Gonzalez; Eidan Ocoro; Jeiner Campillo; Jose Luján; José Valoy; Juan Betancur; Juan Restrepo; Maicol Ortiz; Pablo Tello; Samuel Martinez; Weslyn Mena	Venezuela; Ángel Matute; Carlos Beroes; Carlos Perez; Carlos Berrios; Carlos Bello; Hakeen Ghoues; Jorge Villegas; Jose Castillo; Luis Lopez; Nixon Reyes; Rolando Bello; Yoisbel Galeno	Peru; Adrian Gushiken; Andrew Lujan; Diogo Ramirez; Edgar Vertiz; Fernando Cisneros; Frank Llerena; Gerardo Chicoma; Jhusepy Miranda; Jorge Cano; Leonardo Carrera; Lincol Lopez; Patrick Thornton
Women's tournament	Venezuela; Adnery Santana; Andrea Paez; Diana Prato; Gabriela Noguera; Isabella Sibada; Leydimar Colina; Nisbelin Moreno; Paulina Caraballo; Reibeth Artigas; Sofia Caruci; Yalesca Colina; Yubiangely Farfan	Peru; Alexa Vega; Ariana Vásquez; Brenda Quiroz; Camila Monge; Dafne Diaz; Fátima Villafuerte; Gianella Chanca; Liana Torres; Mariana Chalco; Mariangela Silva; Naomi Palomino; Susana Castro	Colombia; Alejandra García; Helen Lozano; Juanita Hernández; Laura Lucas; Laura Rojas; Maria Payan; Melanie Gallego; Michell Longas; Nicoll Torres; Sara Davalos; Yeily Mina; Yimara Ortega

=== Water skiing ===
Event	Gold	Silver	Bronze
Men's tricks	Matías González; Chile	Pablo Alvira; Colombia	Noé Osorio; Colombia
Men's jump	Sergio Barrientos; Chile	Andrea Pigozzi; Dominican Republic	José Browne; Chile
Men's slalom	Santiago Correa; Colombia	Pablo Alvira; Colombia	Gustavo Kretschmer; Chile
Men's overall	Paolo Pigozzi; Dominican Republic	Sergio Barrientos; Chile	Sebastián Martínez; Colombia
Women's tricks	Daniela Verswyvel; Colombia	Dominga González; Chile	Martina Piedrahita; Colombia
Women's jump	Agustina Varas; Chile	Daniela Verswyvel; Colombia	Martina Piedrahita; Colombia
Women's slalom	Cristhiana De Osma; Peru	Daniela Kretschmer; Chile	Dominga González; Chile
Women's overall	Daniela Verswyvel; Colombia	Agustina Varas; Chile	Dominga González; Chile

=== Weightlifting ===
Event	Gold	Silver	Bronze
Men's 60 kg snatch	Héctor Viveros; Colombia	Jhony Arteaga; Ecuador	Jefferson Gómez; Venezuela
Men's 60 kg clean & jerk	Jefferson Gómez; Venezuela	Héctor Viveros; Colombia	Jhony Arteaga; Ecuador
Men's 65 kg snatch	Héctor García; Colombia	Victor Garrido; Ecuador	Luis Bardalez; Peru
Men's 65 kg clean & jerk	Luis Bardalez; Peru	Héctor García; Colombia	Victor Garrido; Ecuador
Men's 71 kg snatch	Reinner Arango; Venezuela	Andrés Manzano; Colombia	Jair Reyes; Ecuador
Men's 71 kg clean & jerk	Reinner Arango; Venezuela	Andrés Manzano; Colombia	Wilfredo Camey; Guatemala
Men's 79 kg snatch	Julio Mayora; Venezuela	Juan Martínez; Colombia	Santiago Villegas; Peru
Men's 79 kg clean & jerk	Julio Mayora; Venezuela	Juan Martínez; Colombia	Santiago Villegas; Peru
Men's 88 kg snatch	Yeison López; Colombia	Ángel Rodríguez; Venezuela	Amel Atencia; Peru
Men's 88 kg clean & jerk	Yeison López; Colombia	Ángel Rodríguez; Venezuela	Amel Atencia; Peru
Men's 94 kg snatch	Keydomar Vallenilla; Venezuela	Juan David Guadamud; Ecuador	Luis Quiñones; Colombia
Men's 94 kg clean & jerk	Keydomar Vallenilla; Venezuela	Luis Quiñones; Colombia	Dauri Vargas; Dominican Republic
Men's 110 kg snatch	Marcos Bonilla; Colombia	Mauricio Loaiza; Venezuela	Vicente Braulio; Ecuador
Men's 110 kg clean & jerk	Marcos Bonilla; Colombia	Mauricio Loaiza; Venezuela	Vicente Braulio; Ecuador
Men's +110 kg snatch	Rafael Cerro; Colombia	Alonso Bizama; Chile	Luis Espinosa; Venezuela
Men's +110 kg clean & jerk	Rafael Cerro; Colombia	Dixon Arroyo; Ecuador	Rodrigo Morales; El Salvador
Women's 48 kg snatch	Cándida Vásquez; Dominican Republic	Patricia Mercado; Venezuela	Faviana Gavidia; Peru
Women's 48 kg clean & jerk	Patricia Mercado; Venezuela	Cándida Vásquez; Dominican Republic	Yuly Mendoza; El Salvador
Women's 53 kg snatch	Rohelys Galvis; Colombia	Katherin Echandía; Venezuela	Shoely Mego; Peru
Women's 53 kg clean & jerk	Katherin Echandía; Venezuela	Rohelys Galvis; Colombia	Shoely Mego; Peru
Women's 58 kg	Anyelin Venegas; Venezuela	Jennifer Becerra; Ecuador	Gelen Torres; Colombia
Women's 58 kg clean & jerk	Anyelin Venegas; Venezuela	Jennifer Becerra; Ecuador	Victoria Grenni; El Salvador
Women's 63 kg snatch	Yenny Sinisterra; Colombia	Génesis Rodríguez; Venezuela	Jessica Palacios; Ecuador
Women's 63 kg clean & jerk	Yenny Sinisterra; Colombia	Jessica Palacios; Ecuador	Génesis Rodríguez; Venezuela
Women's 69 kg snatch	Julieth Rodríguez; Colombia	Claudia Rengifo; Venezuela	Damary Bravo; Ecuador
Women's 69 kg clean & jerk	Julieth Rodríguez; Colombia	Damary Bravo; Ecuador	Claudia Rengifo; Venezuela
Women's 77 kg snatch	Mari Sánchez; Colombia	Bella Paredes; Ecuador	Keily Silva; Venezuela
Women's 77 kg clean & jerk	Mari Sánchez; Colombia	Bella Paredes; Ecuador	Keily Silva; Venezuela
Women's 86 kg snatch	Yeinny Geles; Colombia	Dayana Chirinos; Venezuela	Kelin Jiménez; Ecuador
Women's 86 kg clean & jerk	Dayana Chirinos; Venezuela	Yeinny Geles; Colombia	Kelin Jiménez; Ecuador
Women's +86 kg snatch	Yairan Tysforod; Colombia	Arantzazu Pavez; Chile	Naryury Perez; Venezuela
Women's +86 kg clean & jerk	Arantzazu Pavez; Chile	Yairan Tysforod; Colombia	Pamela Rojas; Dominican Republic

=== Wrestling ===
Event	Gold	Silver	Bronze
Men's 57 kg freestyle	Elkin España; Colombia	Jose Falcon Reyes; Venezuela	Eduardo Palas Sequeiros; Peru
Men's 65 kg freestyle	Wilfredo Rodriguez Bocaney; Venezuela	Joshua Kramer; Ecuador	Matias Munoz Ramirez; Chile
Men's 74 kg freestyle	Harry Duno Coello; Venezuela	Julio Rodriguez Romero; Dominican Republic	Sixto Auccapina Pedragas; Peru
Men's 86 kg freestyle	Angel Cortes Bonilla; Panama	Pedro Ceballos Fuentes; Venezuela	Jesus Landa Cespedes; Peru
Men's 97 kg freestyle	Cristian Sarco Colmenarez; Venezuela	Carlos Izquierdo; Colombia	Luis Miguel Pérez; Dominican Republic
Men's 125 kg freestyle	José Díaz; Venezuela	Elison García; Dominican Republic	Jefferson Moreno; Peru
Men's 60 kg Greco-roman	Raiber Rodríguez; Venezuela	Clisman Carracedo; Ecuador	Augusto Vargas; Chile
Men's 67 kg Greco-roman	Andrés Montaño; Ecuador	Julián Horta; Colombia	Nilton Soto; Peru
Men's 77 kg Greco-roman	Jair Cuero; Colombia	Leomar Cordero; Venezuela	Eduardo Bernal; Chile
Men's 87 kg Greco-roman	Luis Avendaño; Venezuela	Carlos Muñoz; Colombia	Carlos Espinoza; Peru
Men's 97 kg Greco-roman	Luillis Pérez; Venezuela	Carlos Adames; Dominican Republic	Not awarded
Men's 130 kg Greco-roman	Moisés Pérez; Venezuela	Diego Almendras; Dominican Republic	José Antonio Nuñez; Chile
Women's 50 kg freestyle	Jacqueline Mollocana; Ecuador	Nohalis Loyo; Venezuela	Nathaly Herrera; Peru
Women's 53 kg freestyle	Lucía Yépez; Ecuador	Alexa Álvarez; Venezuela	Yusneiry Agrazal; Panama
Women's 57 kg freestyle	Luisa Valverde; Ecuador	Mayra Parra; Venezuela	Andrea González; Colombia
Women's 62 kg freestyle	Astrid Montero; Venezuela	Virginia Jiménez; Chile	Katherine Rentería; Colombia
Women's 68 kg freestyle	Nathaly Griman; Venezuela	osselyn Portillo; El Salvador	Not awarded
Women's 76 kg freestyle	Génesis Reasco; Ecuador	María Acosta; Venezuela	Tatiana Rentería; Colombia

=== Wushu ===
Event	Gold	Silver	Bronze
Men's -56 kg sanda	Kelvin Moquete; Dominican Republic	Junior Huaman; Peru	Héctor Reyes; Venezuela
Men's +56 to -60 kg sanda	Jeffry Báez; Dominican Republic	Henry Fernández; Peru	Luis Reyes; Venezuela
Men's +60 to -65 kg sanda	Michael Herreras; Peru	Alexis Álvarez; Venezuela	Saúl Quiterio; Dominican Republic
Men's +60 to -65 kg sanda	Michael Herreras; Peru	Alexis Álvarez; Venezuela	Sebastián Aguilar; Bolivia
Men's +65 to -70 kg sanda	Jorman Serrano; Venezuela	Carlos Custodio; Dominican Republic	Edson Rodríguez; Peru
Men's +70 to -75 kg sanda	José Montaño; Venezuela	Yordaly Durán; Dominican Republic	Jeferson Silva; Peru
Men's +75 to -80 kg sanda	Elian Andujar; Dominican Republic	Abraham De la Cruz; Peru	Santiago Anderez; Venezuela
Women's -52 kg sanda	Katiuska Ledezma; Venezuela	Jeanchi Espinoza; Peru	Jerika Lima; Dominican Republic
Women's -52 kg sanda	Katiuska Ledezma; Venezuela	Jeanchi Espinoza; Peru	Maya Lizondo; Bolivia
Women's +56 to -60 kg sanda	Yosmairy Lara; Venezuela	Valentina Soria; Peru	Yenifer García; Dominican Republic
