= Mayte Guzman =

Bolivarian rhythmic gymnast

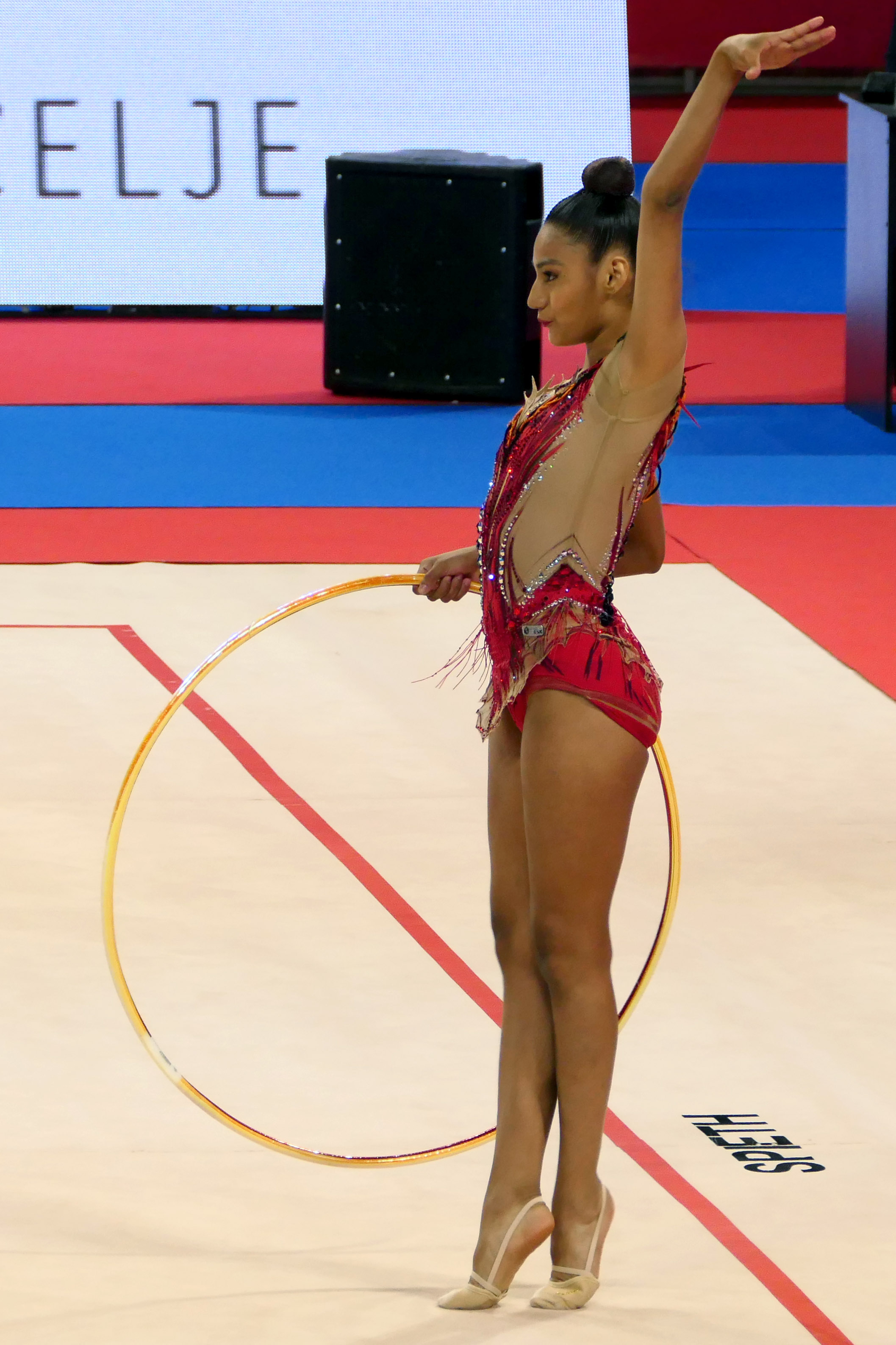

Personal information
- Full name: Mayte Nicole Guzman Vargas
- Born: 30 March 2006 (age 20) Santa Cruz de la Sierra, Bolivia

Gymnastics career
- Discipline: Rhythmic gymnastics
- Country represented: Bolivia; (2022-)
- Training location: Pato Branco, Brazil
- Club: Theophilo Petrycoski
- Head coach: Anita Klemann
Medal record
Rhythmic gymnastics
Representing Bolivia
Bolivarian Games
Silver medal – second place	2025 Peru	Ball
Bronze medal – third place	2025 Peru	All-Around
Bronze medal – third place	2025 Peru	Clubs
Bronze medal – third place	2025 Peru	Ribbon

Mayte Nicole Guzman Vargas (born 30 March 2006) is a Bolivian rhythmic gymnast. She represents Bolivia in international competitions.

== Career ==
Guzman made her international senior debut in October 2022 at the South American Games, being 17th in the All-Around.

In June 2023 she helped the Bolivian team (made of Cibelle Gonzalez and Fabiana Abastoflor) take 11th place at the Pan American Championships in Guadalajara, she was also 30th overall. In November she took 5th place in teams, 7th with hoop, 8th with ball, 13th with clubs and 11th with ribbon at the South American Championships in Barranquilla.

In 2024 she competed in the World Cup in Sofia where she was 54th in the All-Around, 53rd with hoop, 52nd with ball, 55th with clubs and 52nd with ribbon. In June she was selected for the Pan American Championships in Guatemala City, being 8th in teams (along Fabiana Abastoflor and Zhara Rocabado) and 15th in the All-Around. In November she was 6th in teams, 8th in the All-Around, 5th with hoop, 5th with clubs and 6th with ribbon at the South American Championships in Santiago.

At the 2025 Pan American Championships in Asuncion she took 11th place in teams along Valentina Oros, and 16th in the All-Around. In August she was selected for her maiden World Championships in Rio de Janeiro, being 67th in the All-Around, 80th with hoop, 76th with ball, 59th with clubs and 51st with ribbon. In September she was 7th overall, 4th with hoop, 6th with ball, 5th with clubs and 5th in teams, with Fabiana Abastoflor and Zhara Rocabado, at the South American Championships in Cochabamba. In December she competed in the Bolivarian Games in Peru, winning silver with ball as well as bronze in the All-Around, with clubs and with ribbon.

== Routine music information ==
Year	Apparatus	Music title
2025	Hoop	Encore by Thilo Wolf Jazz Quartett & Berliner Saxophon Ensemble
2025	Ball	Romaria by Daniel & Seu Jorge
2025	Clubs	Pango Pango by The Atomic Fireballs
2025	Ribbon	Cafe Europa (Live) by Deep Forest
2024	Hoop	Encore by Thilo Wolf Jazz Quartett & Berliner Saxophon Ensemble
2024	Ball	Stand by Me by Playing For Change Band
2024	Clubs	Pango Pango by The Atomic Fireballs
2024	Ribbon	Cafe Europa (Live) by Deep Forest
