= Natalia Jiménez (gymnast) =

Colombian rhythmic gymnast

- Full name: Natalia Jiménez Tamayo
- Born: 5 October 2006 (age 19) Pereira, Colombia

Gymnastics career
- Discipline: Rhythmic gymnastics
- Country represented: Colombia; (2022-)
Medal record
Rhythmic gymnastics
Representing Colombia
Pacific Rim Championships
| Bronze medal – third place | 2024 Cali | Group All-Around |
| Bronze medal – third place | 2024 Cali | 5 Hoops |
| Bronze medal – third place | 2024 Cali | 3 Ribbons + 2 Balls |
South American Games
| Bronze medal – third place | 2026 Santa Fe | Group All-Around |
South American Championships
| Bronze medal – third place | 2022 Paipa | Group all-around |
| Bronze medal – third place | 2022 Paipa | 3 Ribbons + 2 Balls |
| Bronze medal – third place | 2022 Paipa | All-Around Team |
Junior South American Championships
| Bronze medal – third place | 2021 Cali | 5 Ribbons |
Central American and Caribbean Games
| Silver medal – second place | 2023 San Salvador | 5 Hoops |
| Bronze medal – third place | 2023 San Salvador | All-Around |
| Bronze medal – third place | 2023 San Salvador | 3 Ribbons + 2 Balls |
| Bronze medal – third place | 2026 Santo Domingo | Group All-Around |
Pan American Championships
| Bronze medal – third place | 2024 Ciudad de Guatemala | All-Around |
Bolivarian Games
| Gold medal – first place | 2022 Valledupar | Group All-around |
| Silver medal – second place | 2022 Valledupar | 5 Hoops |
| Silver medal – second place | 2022 Valledupar | 3 Ribbons + 2 Balls |
| Silver medal – second place | 2025 Peru | 3 Balls + 2 Hoops |
| Bronze medal – third place | 2025 Peru | Group All-Around |

Natalia Jiménez Tamayo (born 5 October 2006) is a Colombian rhythmic gymnast. She represents her country in international competitions.

== Career ==
Natalia was part of the junior group, along Ana Maria Márquez, Isabella Ospina, Laura Patiño and Adriana Mantilla, won bronze with 5 ribbons at the 2021 South American Championships.

debuted as a senior in 2022, when she competed in the Bolivarian Games in Valledupar, winning gold in the All-Around and silver in the event finals as a member of the senior group. In the Pan American Championships in Rio de Janeiro, along Angelica Guerrero, Karen Duarte, Adriana Mantilla, Nicol Mora and Kizzy Rivas, took 8th place in the All-Around and 5th with 5 hoops. In late November she won bronze in the All-Around, with 3 ribbons + 2 balls and in teams at the South American Championships along Karen Duarte, Adriana Mantilla, Paula Flechas, Kizzy Rivas and Isabella Salazar.

In June 2023 the group was 8th overall at the Pan American Championships in Guadalajara, as well as 7th with 5 hoops and 6th with 3 ribbons & 2 balls final. Twenty days later the groups, made of Karen, Kizzy Rivas, Karen Duarte, Laura Patiño and Adriana Mantilla, won bronze in the All-Around and in the mixed event and silver with 5 hoops at the Central American and Caribbean Games. In the same year, at the Pan American Games, she helped the group take 5th place in the All-Around, 5th place with 5 hoops and 4th place with 3 ribbons & 2 balls.

In 2024 she won bronze in the All-Around along Paula Flechas, Karen Duarte, Adriana Mantilla, Laura Patiño and Kizzy Rivas, at the Pan American Championships in Ciudad de Guatemala.
