= Karen Duarte =

Colombian rhythmic gymnast

- Full name: Karen Lorena Duarte Fernandez
- Born: 20 January 2006 (age 20) Bogotá, Colombia

Gymnastics career
- Discipline: Rhythmic gymnastics
- Country represented: Colombia (2022–)
Medal record
Rhythmic gymnastics
Representing Colombia
Pacific Rim Championships
Bronze medal – third place	2024 Cali	Group All-Around
Bronze medal – third place	2024 Cali	5 Hoops
Bronze medal – third place	2024 Cali	3 Ribbons + 2 Balls
South American Championships
Bronze medal – third place	2022 Paipa	Group all-around
Bronze medal – third place	2022 Paipa	3 Ribbons + 2 Balls
Bronze medal – third place	2022 Paipa	All-Around Team
Central American and Caribbean Games
Silver medal – second place	2023 San Salvador	5 Hoops
Bronze medal – third place	2023 San Salvador	All-Around
Bronze medal – third place	2023 San Salvador	3 Ribbons + 2 Balls
Pan American Championships
Bronze medal – third place	2024 Guatemala City	All-Around
Bolivarian Games
Gold medal – first place	2022 Valledupar	Group All-around
Silver medal – second place	2022 Valledupar	5 Hoops
Silver medal – second place	2022 Valledupar	3 Ribbons + 2 Balls
Silver medal – second place	2025 Peru	3 Balls + 2 Hoops
Bronze medal – third place	2025 Peru	Group All-Around

Karen Lorena Duarte Fernandez (born 20 January 2006) is a Colombian rhythmic gymnast.

== Career ==
Karen debuted as a senior in 2022, when she competed in the Pan American Championships in Rio de Janeiro as a member of the national senior group. There, along Angelica Guerrero, Natalia Jiménez, Adriana Mantilla, Nicol Mora and Kizzy Rivas, took 8th place in the All-Around and 5th with 5 hoops. In late November she won bronze in the All-Around, with 3 ribbons + 2 balls and in teams at the South American Championships along Adriana Mantilla, Natalia Jiménez, Paula Flechas, Kizzy Rivas and Isabella Salazar.

In June 2023 the group was 8th overall at the Pan American Championships in Guadalajara, as well as 7th with 5 hoops and 6th with 3 ribbons & 2 balls final. Twenty days later the groups, made of Karen, Kizzy Rivas, Natalia Jiménez, Laura Patiño and Adriana Mantilla, won bronze in the All-Around and in the mixed event and silver with 5 hoops at the Central American and Caribbean Games. In the same year, at the Pan American Games, she helped the group take 5th place in the All-Around, 5th place with 5 hoops and 4th place with 3 ribbons & 2 balls.

In 2024 she won bronze in the All-Around along Paula Flechas, Natalia Jiménez, Adriana Mantilla, Laura Patiño and Kizzy Rivas, at the Pan American Championships in Ciudad de Guatemala.
