= Adriana Mantilla =

Colombian rhythmic gymnast

- Full name: Adriana Lucia Mantilla Camargo
- Born: 5 October 2006 (age 20) Cúcuta, Colombia

Gymnastics career
- Discipline: Rhythmic gymnastics
- Country represented: Colombia; (2022-)
Medal record
Rhythmic gymnastics
Representing Colombia
Pacific Rim Championships
Bronze medal – third place	2024 Cali	Group All-Around
Bronze medal – third place	2024 Cali	5 Hoops
Bronze medal – third place	2024 Cali	3 Ribbons + 2 Balls
South American Games
Bronze medal – third place	2026 Santa Fe	Group All-Around
South American Championships
Bronze medal – third place	2022 Paipa	Group all-around
Bronze medal – third place	2022 Paipa	3 Ribbons + 2 Balls
Bronze medal – third place	2022 Paipa	All-Around Team
Junior South American Championships
Bronze medal – third place	2021 Cali	5 Ribbons
Central American and Caribbean Games
Silver medal – second place	2023 San Salvador	5 Hoops
Bronze medal – third place	2023 San Salvador	All-Around
Bronze medal – third place	2023 San Salvador	3 Ribbons + 2 Balls
Bronze medal – third place	2026 Santo Domingo	Group All-Around
Pan American Championships
Bronze medal – third place	2024 Ciudad de Guatemala	All-Around
Bolivarian Games
Gold medal – first place	2022 Valledupar	Group All-around
Silver medal – second place	2022 Valledupar	5 Hoops
Silver medal – second place	2022 Valledupar	3 Ribbons + 2 Balls

Adriana Lucia Mantilla Camargo (born 5 October 2006) is a Colombian rhythmic gymnast. She represents her country in international competitions.

== Career ==
Adriana was part of the junior group, along Ana Maria Márquez, Isabella Ospina, Laura Patiño and Natalia Jiménez, won bronze with 5 ribbons at the 2021 South American Championships.

She debuted as a senior in 2022, when she competed in the Bolivarian Games in Valledupar, winning gold in the All-Around and silver in the event finals as a member of the senior group. the Pan American Championships in Rio de Janeiro, along Angelica Guerrero, Natalia Jiménez, Karen Duarte, Nicol Mora and Kizzy Rivas, took 8th place in the All-Around and 5th with 5 hoops. In late November she won bronze in the All-Around, with 3 ribbons + 2 balls and in teams at the South American Championships along Karen Duarte, Natalia Jiménez, Paula Flechas, Kizzy Rivas and Isabella Salazar.

In June 2023 the group was 8th overall at the Pan American Championships in Guadalajara, as well as 7th with 5 hoops and 6th with 3 ribbons & 2 balls final. Twenty days later the group, made of Adriana, Kizzy Rivas, Natalia Jiménez, Laura Patiño and Karen Duarte won bronze in the All-Around and in the mixed event and silver with 5 hoops at the Central American and Caribbean Games. In the same year, at the Pan American Games, she helped the group take 5th place in the All-Around, 5th place with 5 hoops and 4th place with 3 ribbons & 2 balls.

In 2024 she won bronze in the All-Around along Paula Flechas, Natalia Jiménez, Karen Duarte, Laura Patiño and Kizzy Rivas, at the Pan American Championships in Ciudad de Guatemala.
