= Kizzy Rivas =

Colombian rhythmic gymnast

- Full name: Kizzy De Los Angeles Rivas Martinez
- Born: 7 May 2001 (age 25) Caracas, Venezuela

Gymnastics career
- Discipline: Rhythmic gymnastics
- Country represented: Colombia; (2022-)
- Former countries represented: Venezuela
Medal record
Rhythmic gymnastics
Representing Venezuela
Central American and Caribbean Games
Bronze medal – third place	2018 Barranquilla	All-Around
Bronze medal – third place	2018 Barranquilla	5 Hoops
Bronze medal – third place	2018 Barranquilla	3 Balls + 2 Ropes
South American Championships
Silver medal – second place	2019 Bogotá	Group all-around
Silver medal – second place	2019 Bogotá	5 balls
Silver medal – second place	2019 Bogotá	3 hoops + 4 clubs
Representing Colombia
Pacific Rim Championships
Bronze medal – third place	2024 Cali	Group All-Around
Bronze medal – third place	2024 Cali	5 Hoops
Bronze medal – third place	2024 Cali	3 Ribbons + 2 Balls
Central American and Caribbean Games
Silver medal – second place	2023 San Salvador	5 Hoops
Bronze medal – third place	2023 San Salvador	All-Around
Bronze medal – third place	2023 San Salvador	3 Ribbons + 2 Balls
Bronze medal – third place	2026 Santo Domingo	Group All-Around
Pan American Championships
Bronze medal – third place	2024 Ciudad de Guatemala	All-Around
Bolivarian Games
Gold medal – first place	2022 Valledupar	Group All-around
Silver medal – second place	2022 Valledupar	5 Hoops
Silver medal – second place	2022 Valledupar	3 Ribbons + 2 Balls
Silver medal – second place	2025 Peru	3 Balls + 2 Hoops
Bronze medal – third place	2025 Peru	Group All-Around
South American Games
Bronze medal – third place	2026 Santa Fe	Group All-Around
South American Championships
Bronze medal – third place	2022 Paipa	Group all-around
Bronze medal – third place	2022 Paipa	3 Ribbons + 2 Balls
Bronze medal – third place	2022 Paipa	All-Around Team

Kizzy De Los Angeles Rivas Martinez (born 7 May 2001) is a Colombian-Venezuelan rhythmic gymnast. She represents her country in international competitions.

== Career ==
Kizzy took up rhythmic gymnastics at age 7, she entered the Venezuelan national team when she was 11.

At the 2018 Central American and Caribbean Games she won three bronze medals as part of the senior group.

In 2019 she was part of the group (made up of Kizzy, Maria Waleska Ojeda, Juliette Quiroz, Dahilin Parra, Sofia Suarez and Jadeliz Zambrano) won all three silver medals at the South American Championships. Later that year she competed at the Pan American Games in Lima, finishing 6th in the All-Around, 6th with 5 balls and 4th with 3 hoops & 2 clubs.

In 2022 she changed nationality to represent Colombia competed in the Bolivarian Games in Valledupar, winning gold in the All-Around and silver in the event finals as a member of the senior group. At the Pan American Gymnastics Championships in Rio de Janeiro, along Angelica Guerrero, Natalia Jiménez, Adriana Mantilla, Nicol Mora and Karen Duarte, took 8th place in the All-Around and 5th with 5 hoops. In late November she won bronze in the All-Around, with 3 ribbons + 2 balls and in teams at the South American Championships along Karen Duarte, Natalia Jiménez, Paula Flechas, Adriana Mantilla and Isabella Salazar.

In June 2023 the group was 8th overall at the Pan American Championships in Guadalajara, as well as 7th with 5 hoops and 6th with 3 ribbons & 2 balls final. Twenty days later the groups, made of Kizzy, Karen Duarte, Natalia Jiménez, Laura Patiño and Adriana Mantilla, won bronze in the All-Around and in the mixed event and silver with 5 hoops at the Central American and Caribbean Games. In the same year, at the Pan American Games, she helped the group take 5th place in the All-Around, 5th place with 5 hoops and 4th place with 3 ribbons & 2 balls.

In 2024 she won bronze in the All-Around along Paula Flechas, Natalia Jiménez, Adriana Mantilla, Laura Patiño and Karen Duarte, at the Pan American Championships in Ciudad de Guatemala.
