= Laura Patiño =

Colombian rhythmic gymnast

- Born: 2 November 2007 (age 18) Sogamoso, Colombia

Gymnastics career
- Discipline: Rhythmic gymnastics
- Country represented: Colombia (2023-)
Medal record
Rhythmic gymnastics
Representing Colombia
Pacific Rim Championships
Bronze medal – third place	2024 Cali	Group All-Around
Bronze medal – third place	2024 Cali	5 Hoops
Bronze medal – third place	2024 Cali	3 Ribbons + 2 Balls
Junior South American Championships
Bronze medal – third place	2021 Cali	5 Ribbons
Bronze medal – third place	2022 Paipa	Team
Bronze medal – third place	2022 Paipa	All-Around Team
Central American and Caribbean Games
Silver medal – second place	2023 San Salvador	5 Hoops
Bronze medal – third place	2023 San Salvador	All-Around
Bronze medal – third place	2023 San Salvador	3 Ribbons + 2 Balls
Pan American Championships
Bronze medal – third place	2024 Ciudad de Guatemala	All-Around

Laura Patiño (born 2 November 2007) is a Colombian rhythmic gymnast. She represents her country in international competitions.

== Career ==
Laura was part of the junior group, along Ana Maria Márquez, Isabella Ospina, Adriana Mantilla and Natalia Jiménez, won bronze with 5 ribbons at the 2021 South American Championships.

She debuted as a senior in 2023 when, along Kizzy Rivas, Natalia Jiménez, Karen Duarte and Adriana Mantilla, won bronze in the All-Around and in the mixed event and silver with 5 hoops at the Central American and Caribbean Games. In the same year, at the Pan American Games, she helped the group take 5th place in the All-Around, 5th place with 5 hoops and 4th place with 3 ribbons & 2 balls.

In 2024 she won bronze in the All-Around along Paula Flechas, Natalia Jiménez, Adriana Mantilla, Karen Duarte and Kizzy Rivas, at the Pan American Championships in Ciudad de Guatemala.
