= María Fernanda Zúñiga =

Chilean footballer (born 1997)

Personal information
- Full name: María Fernanda Zúñiga Cifuentes
- Date of birth: 12 September 1997 (age 29)
- Place of birth: Chile
- Height: 1.70 m (5 ft 7 in)
- Position: Goalkeeper

Team information
- Current team: Unión Española

Youth career
- Palestino

Senior career*
Years	Team	Apps	(Gls)
2015–2018	Palestino		
2019–2022	Universidad de Chile		
2023	Estudiantes		
2024–	Unión Española		

International career
2013	Chile U17		
2015	Chile U20		
- * Club domestic league appearances and goals

María Fernanda Zúñiga Cifuentes (born 12 September 1997) is a Chilean footballer who plays as a goalkeeper for Unión Española.

== Club career ==
As a child, Zúñiga played against male players at both her neighbourhood and SIFUP, the trade union of professional football players in Chile.

At club level, she began her career with Palestino from 2015 to 2018.

In 2019, she switched to Universidad de Chile, signing her first professional contract in February 2022.

In 2023, she moved to Argentina and joined Estudiantes de La Plata in the Primera División A, making her debut against Estudiantes de Buenos Aires. The next season, she returned to Chile and joined Unión Española.

== International career ==
Having taken part in several trials with the Chile national team at youth level since 2011, she represented the under-17's in the 2013 South American Championship and the under-20's in the 2015 South American Championship.

== Personal life ==
She is nicknamed Paco or Pakito.
