= Gymnastics at the 2023 Pan American Games – Women's floor =

Women's floor at the 2023 Pan American Games
- Venue: Training Center for Collective Sport
- Dates: October 25
- Competitors: 8 from 5 nations
- Winning score: 14.233

Medalists
Gold medal	Kaliya Lincoln	United States
Silver medal	Kayla DiCello	United States
Silver medal	Flávia Saraiva	Brazil

The women's floor exercise gymnastic event at the 2023 Pan American Games was held on October 25 at the Training Center for Collective Sport.

== Results ==
=== Final ===
Rank	Gymnast	D Score	E Score	Pen.	Total
1st place, gold medalist(s)	Kaliya Lincoln (USA)	6.1	8.133		14.233
2nd place, silver medalist(s)	Kayla DiCello (USA)	5.5	8.233		13.733
2nd place, silver medalist(s)	Flávia Saraiva (BRA)	5.5	8.233		13.733
4	Júlia Soares (BRA)	5.4	8.233		13.633
5	Aurélie Tran (CAN)	4.8	8.366		13.166
6	Hillary Heron (PAN)	5.3	7.433	0.1	12.633
7	Sydney Turner (CAN)	4.5	8.000		12.500
8	Bárbara Achondo (CHI)	4.4	7.900	0.1	12.200

=== Qualification ===
Rank	Gymnast	D Score	E Score	Pen.	Total	Qual.
1	Kaliya Lincoln (USA)	6.100	8.000	0.3	13.800	Q
2	Kayla DiCello (USA)	5.500	8.133		13.633	Q
3	Flávia Saraiva (BRA)	5.400	8.100	0.1	13.400	Q
4	Júlia Soares (BRA)	5.400	8.000		13.400	Q
5	Jade Barbosa (BRA)	5.500	7.833		13.333	–
6	Jordan Chiles (USA)	6.000	7.300	0.1	13.200	–
7	Tiana Sumanasekera (USA)	5.700	7.300		13.000	–
8	Hillary Heron (PAN)	5.500	7.466		12.966	Q
9	Aurélie Tran (CAN)	4.800	7.866		12.666	Q
10	Bárbara Achondo (CHI)	4.600	8.033		12.633	Q
11	Sydney Turner (CAN)	4.500	8.000		12.500	Q
12	Ava Stewart (CAN)	4.800	7.666		12.466	–
13	Milagros Curti Ruiz (ARG)	4.800	7.733	0.1	12.433	R1
14	Natalia Escalera (MEX)	5.300	7.500	0.4	12.400	R2
15	Cassie Lee (CAN)	4.800	7.633	0.1	12.333	–
16	Carolyne Pedro (BRA)	5.000	7.300		12.300	–
17	Makarena Pinto (CHI)	4.800	7.233		12.033	R3
