= Sydney Barros =

American artistic gymnast

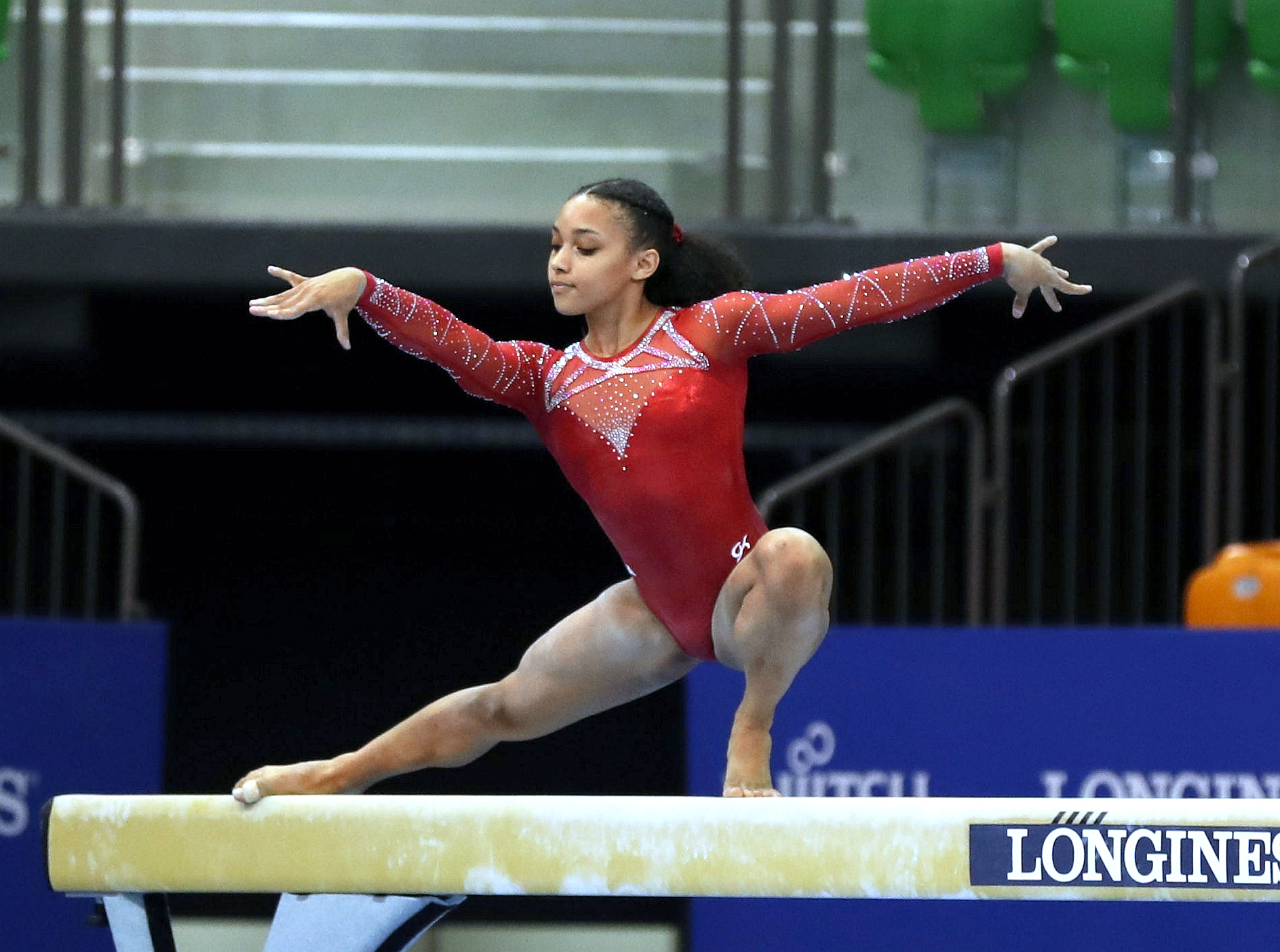
- Barros at the 2019 Junior World Championships

Personal information
- Full name: Sydney Tatiana Barros
- Born: February 21, 2005 (age 21) Atlanta, Georgia
- Height: 5 ft 3 in (160 cm)

Gymnastics career
- Discipline: Women's artistic gymnastics
- Country represented: Puerto Rico; (2023)
- Former countries represented: United States (2018–2021)
- College team: UCLA Bruins (2024–present)
- Club: Texas Dreams; Gymnastics Academy of Atlanta
- Head coach: Kim Zmeskal
Medal record
Representing the United States
Junior World Championships
| Bronze medal – third place | 2019 Győr | Team |

Sydney Tatiana Barros (born February 21, 2005) is an American artistic gymnast currently representing Puerto Rico in international competitions. While representing the United States, she was a member of the team that won bronze at the inaugural Junior World Championships.

== Early life ==
Barros was born to Bifredo and Carine Barros in 2005 in Atlanta, Georgia. She has four siblings.

== Junior gymnastics career ==
=== 2016–17 ===
In 2016, Baros was part of the HOPEs program. She competed at the 2016 HOPES Championships where she placed second in the all-around behind Konnor McClain. She posted the third-highest scores on both vault and floor exercises.

In 2017, Barros competed for the Gymnastics Academy of Atlanta. She appeared in competition for the club from January through April and qualified for junior elite status at the KPAC National Qualifier. She then moved to Texas Dreams and in late July she competed at the 2017 U.S. Classic where she placed 18th in the all-around. She qualified to compete at the 2017 National Championships where she placed 23rd in the all-around.

=== 2018 ===
In 2018, Barros competed at a verification camp where she placed fourth amongst the juniors behind Sunisa Lee, Kayla DiCello, and Jordan Bowers. Due to her performance, she was named to the team to compete at the Junior Pan American Championships; as a result, she was also added to the junior national team. Later that month Barros traveled to Italy to compete at the 2018 City of Jesolo Trophy alongside her club teammates Ragan Smith and Emma Malabuyo. While there, Barros only competed in the floor exercise and vault as she injured her ankle on the latter and withdrew from the remainder of the competition. Due to the injury she also withdrew from the Pan American Championships.

Barros returned to competition to compete at the 2018 U.S. Classic; however, she only competed on uneven bars and balance beam, finishing 13th and 31st, respectively. She competed the all-around at the 2018 National Championships where after day 1 she was ranked 17th. She withdrew from the second day of competition.

=== 2019 ===
Barros competed at the Parkettes National Qualifier, finished second behind éMjae Frazier, and re-qualified as a junior elite. In June Barros competed at the Junior World Championships Trials where she placed third in the all-around and was named to the team to compete at the inaugural Junior World Championships alongside Skye Blakely and Kayla DiCello.

At the Junior World Championships, Barros helped the team win bronze behind Russia and China and finished fifth in the all-around. She qualified for the vault event final in first place. During event finals Barros placed fifth on vault.

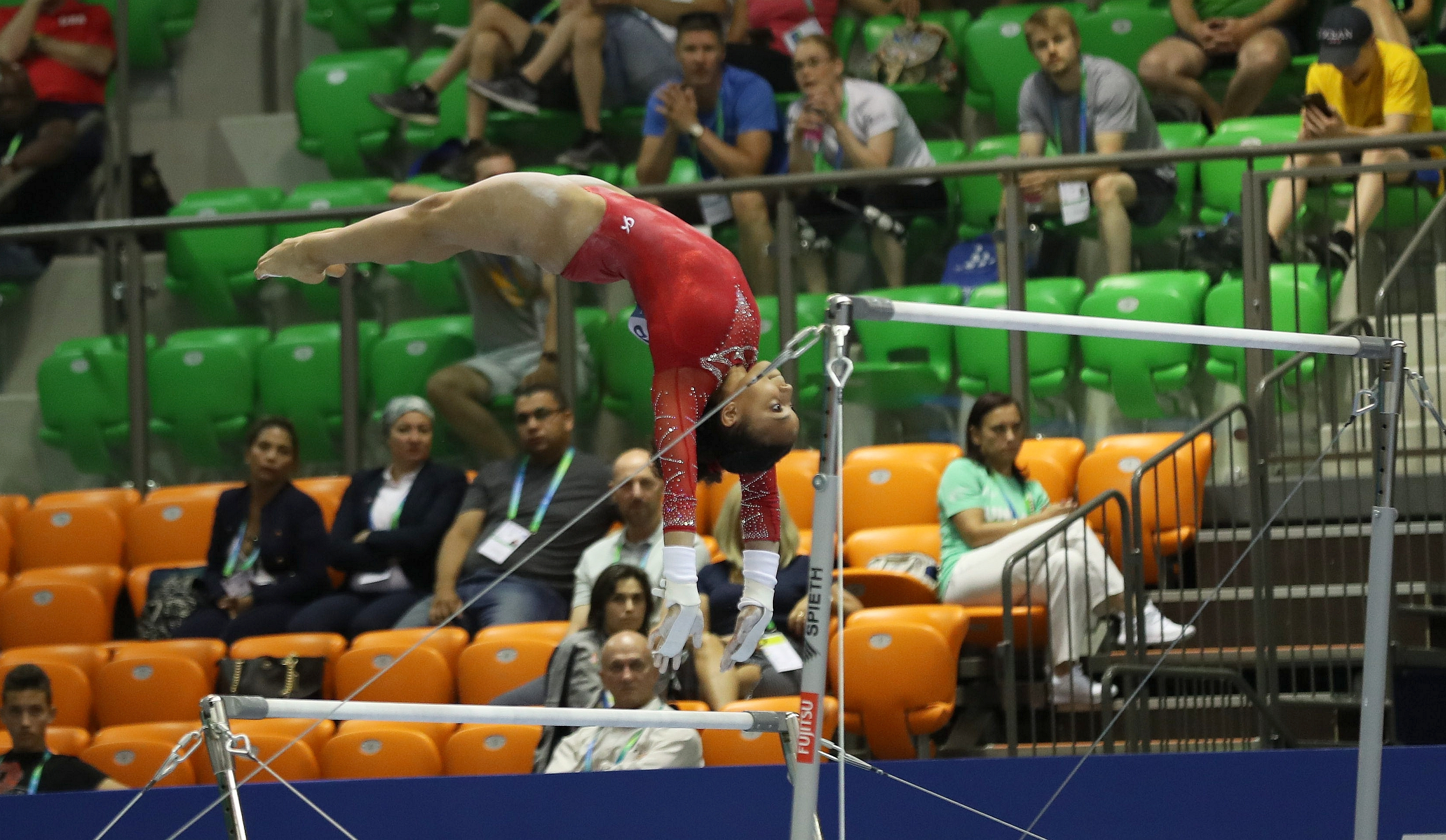
Team / All-Around Final

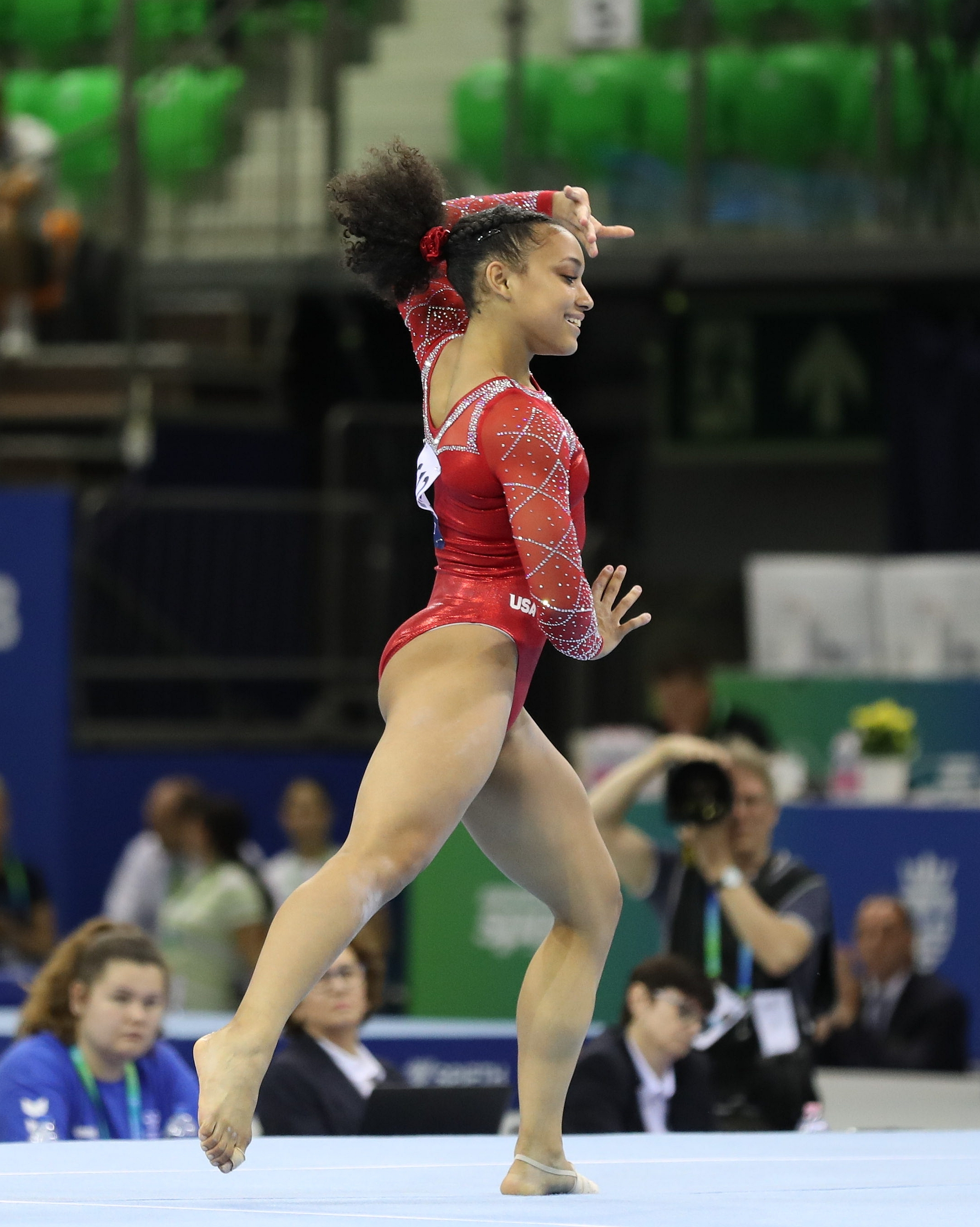
Team / All-Around Final

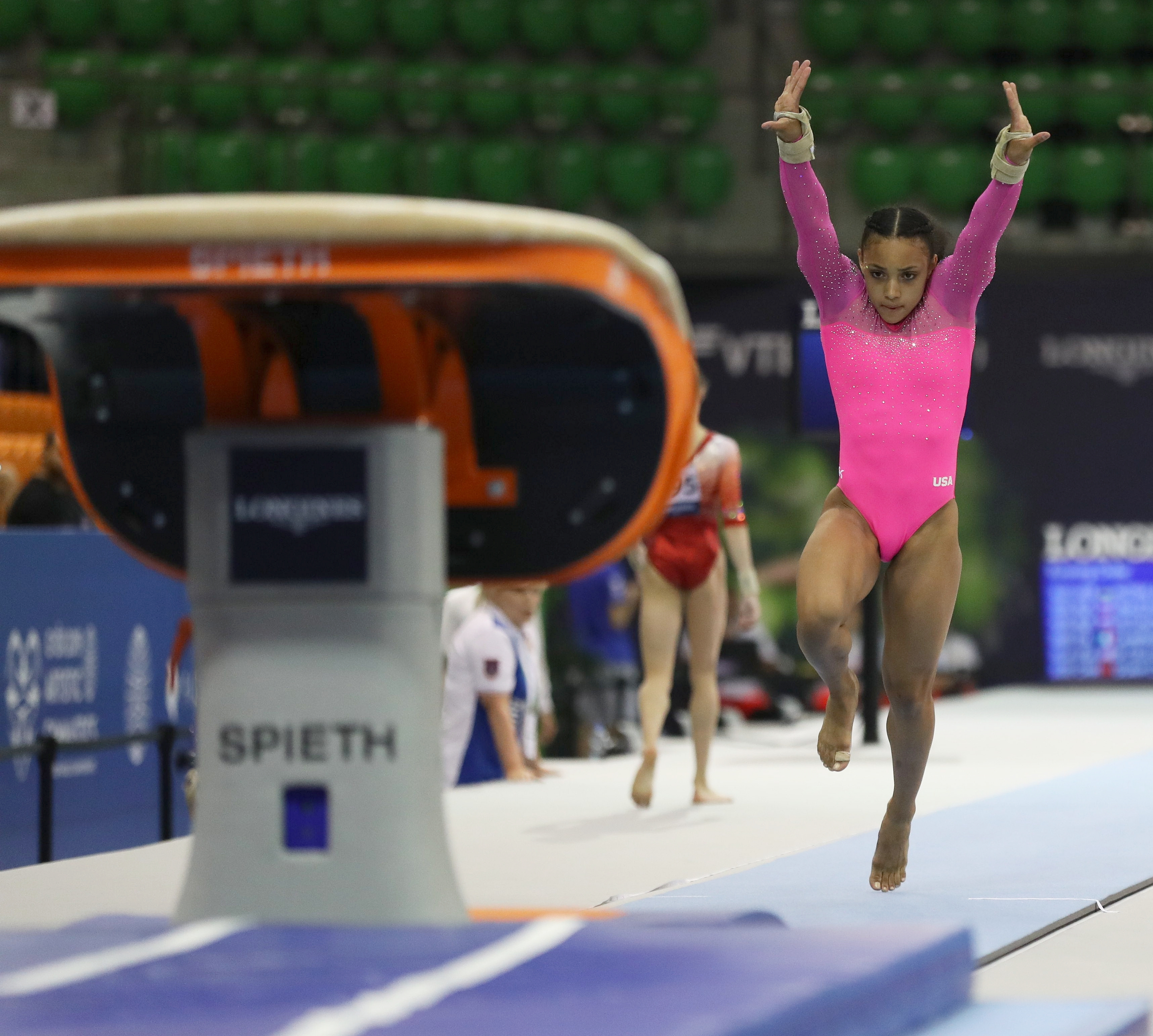
Vault Final

Barros at the 2019 Junior World Championships

In July, Barros competed at the U.S. Classic where she won silver in the all-around behind Konnor McClain. Additionally, she won bronze on vault (behind McClain and Blakely) and balance beam (behind McClain and Ciena Alipio), silver on floor exercise behind Blakely, and placed sixth on uneven bars.

In August, Barros competed at the U.S. National Championships. After the first day of competition, she scored 55.250 and was in fourth place. During the second day of competition scored a 54.550, giving her a total combined score of 109.850 which was a fifth-place finish. Barros won bronze on uneven bars behind Olivia Greaves and McClain and tied with DiCello and won silver on floor exercise behind DiCello. As a result, she was named to the junior national team.

== Senior gymnastics career ==
=== 2021–22 ===
Barros became age-eligible for senior-level competition in 2021. She competed at the Winter Cup, U.S. Classic, and the U.S. National Championships.

Barros finished ninth at the 2022 Winter Cup. In November of that year she officially signed her National Letter of Intent with the UCLA Bruins. Later that month the International Gymnastics Federation approved her nationality switch allowing Barros to start representing Puerto Rico in international competitions.

== Competitive history ==
Competitive history of Sydney Barros representing the United States at the junior level
| Year | Event | Team | AA | VT | UB | BB | FX |
|---|---|---|---|---|---|---|---|
| 2017 | U.S. Classic | | 18 | 19 | 32 | 16 | 23 |
| 2017 | US National Championships | | 23 | 19 | 28 | 13 | 23 |
| 2018 | Verification Camp | | 4 | | | | |
| 2018 | City of Jesolo Trophy | | WD | | | | |
| 2018 | U.S. Classic | | | 13 | 31 | | |
| 2018 | U.S. National Championships | | WD | | | | |
| 2019 | Parkettes National Qualifier | | 2nd place, silver medalist(s) | | | | |
| 2019 | Jr. World Championships Trials | | 3rd place, bronze medalist(s) | | | | |
| 2019 | Junior World Championships | 3rd place, bronze medalist(s) | 5 | 5 | | | |
| 2019 | U.S. Classic | | 2nd place, silver medalist(s) | 3rd place, bronze medalist(s) | 6 | 3rd place, bronze medalist(s) | 2nd place, silver medalist(s) |
| 2019 | U.S. National Championships | | 5 | 6 | 3rd place, bronze medalist(s) | 9 | 2nd place, silver medalist(s) |

Competitive history of Sydney Barros representing the United States at the senior level
| Year | Event | Team | AA | VT | UB | BB | FX |
|---|---|---|---|---|---|---|---|
| 2021 | Winter Cup | | | 20 | | 16 | 10 |
| 2021 | U.S. Classic | | 19 | | 25 | 21 | 27 |
| 2021 | U.S. National Championships | | 18 | | 13 | 20 | 22 |
| 2022 | Winter Cup | | 9 | | 10 | 6 | 13 |

Competitive history of Sydney Barros representing Puerto Rico
| Year | Event | Team | AA | VT | UB | BB | FX |
|---|---|---|---|---|---|---|---|
| 2023 | PR National Championships | | 1st place, gold medalist(s) | | | | |
| 2023 | Pan American Championships | 8 | 8 | | 11 | 11 | 13 |
| 2023 | Central American & Caribbean Games | 6 | | | | | |

Competitive history of Sydney Barros at NCAA level
| Year | Event | Team | AA | VT | UB | BB | FX |
|---|---|---|---|---|---|---|---|
| 2024 | Pac-12 Championship | 4 | | | | | |
| 2025 | Big Ten Championship | 1st place, gold medalist(s) | | | | | |
| 2025 | NCAA Championship | 2nd place, silver medalist(s) | | | | | |
| 2026 | Big Ten Championship | 1st place, gold medalist(s) | | | 1st place, gold medalist(s) | | |
| 2026 | NCAA Championship | 5 | | | 22 | 17 | 33 |

== See also ==
- Nationality changes in gymnastics
