= Gymnastics at the 2023 Pan American Games – Women's balance beam =

Women's balance beam at the 2023 Pan American Games
- Venue: Training Center for Collective Sport
- Dates: October 25
- Competitors: 8 from 5 nations
- Winning score: 14.166

Medalists
Gold medal	Rebeca Andrade	Brazil
Silver medal	Flávia Saraiva	Brazil
Bronze medal	Ava Stewart	Canada

The women's balance beam gymnastic event at the 2023 Pan American Games was held on October 25 at the Training Center for Collective Sport.

== Results ==
=== Final ===
Rank	Gymnast	D Score	E Score	Pen.	Total
1st place, gold medalist(s)	Rebeca Andrade (BRA)	6.1	8.066		14.166
2nd place, silver medalist(s)	Flávia Saraiva (BRA)	5.7	8.333		14.033
3rd place, bronze medalist(s)	Ava Stewart (CAN)	6.3	7.600		13.900
4	Kayla DiCello (USA)	5.7	8.100		13.800
5	Cassandra Loustalot (MEX)	5.4	7.900		13.300
6	Kaliya Lincoln (USA)	5.4	7.766		13.166
7	Luisa Blanco (COL)	5.2	7.066	0.1	12.166
8	Aurélie Tran (CAN)	5.1	7.033		12.133

=== Qualification ===
Rank	Gymnast	D Score	E Score	Pen.	Total	Qual.
1	Ava Stewart (CAN)	6.000	7.666		13.666	Q
2	Rebeca Andrade (BRA)	5.800	7.766		13.566	Q
3	Flávia Saraiva (BRA)	5.500	7.933		13.433	Q
4	Kaliya Lincoln (USA)	5.500	7.733		13.233	Q
5	Kayla DiCello (USA)	5.700	7.366		13.066	Q
6	Tiana Sumanasekera (USA)	6.100	7.066	0.1	13.066	–
7	Jordan Chiles (USA)	5.200	7.800		13.000	–
8	Aurélie Tran (CAN)	5.000	7.866		12.866	Q
9	Júlia Soares (BRA)	5.400	7.366	0.1	12.666	–
10	Cassandra Loustalot (MEX)	5.400	7.266		12.666	Q
11	Sydney Turner (CAN)	5.300	7.333		12.633	–
12	Jade Barbosa (BRA)	5.100	7.500		12.600	–
13	Luisa Blanco (COL)	5.200	7.166	0.1	12.266	Q
14	Nicole Iribarne (ARG)	4.600	7.533		12.133	R1
15	Cassie Lee (CAN)	4.900	7.133		12.033	–
16	Natalia Escalera (MEX)	5.300	6.666		11.966	R2
17	Lucila Estarli (ARG)	4.600	7.333		11.933	R3
