= Ciena Alipio =

American artistic gymnast

- Full name: Ciena Alipio
- Nickname: C
- Born: March 7, 2004 (age 22) San Jose, California USA

Gymnastics career
- Discipline: Women's artistic gymnastics
- Country represented: United States; (2019–2022)
- College team: UCLA Bruins (2023–26)
- Club: Midwest Gymnastics Center
- Head coaches: Jess Graba; Alison Lim
Medal record
Representing the UCLA Bruins
NCAA Championships
Silver medal – second place	2025 Fort Worth	Team
Bronze medal – third place	2025 Fort Worth	Balance beam

Ciena Alipio (born March 7, 2004) is an American artistic gymnast and former member of the United States women's national gymnastics team. She competed in NCAA gymnastics for the UCLA Bruins.

== Early life ==
Alipio was born to Linda and Dante Alipio in 2004 in San Jose, California. She has one brother, Eric. Alipio’s mother's side of the family is from the Navajo Nation.

== Gymnastics career ==
=== 2015–16 ===
In 2015 Alipio was part of the Junior Olympic Program and competed at various HOPEs competitions. She competed at the 2015 HOPES Championships where she placed first on the balance, second in the all-around and on floor exercise, sixth on uneven bars, and eighth on vault. In 2016 she competed at the 2016 Women's Junior Olympic National Championships where she placed second on floor exercise. She also competed at the 2016 Hopes Classic where she placed first in the all-around and at 2016 Hopes Championships where she placed first on balance beam and second in the all-around.

=== 2017–18 ===
In 2017 Alipio qualified for junior elite status at the Brestyans National Qualifier. She made her elite debut at the American Classic where she placed 11th in the all-around. In late July she competed at the 2017 U.S. Classic where she placed 16th in the all-around. She ended the season competing at the 2017 U.S. National Gymnastics Championships where she placed 21st in the all-around.

In early July 2018, Alipio competed at the American Classic where she placed ninth in the all-around. Later that month she competed at the 2018 U.S. Classic where she placed 17th in the all-around. In August Alipio competed at the 2018 U.S. National Gymnastics Championships. She finished sixteenth in the all-around but won silver on balance beam, finishing behind Konnor McClain.

=== 2019 ===
In February, Alipio was named to the team to compete at the 2019 City of Jesolo Trophy in Italy, her first international assignment, alongside Kayla DiCello, Konnor McClain, and Sophia Butler. As a result, she was added onto the junior national team. While there she helped the USA win team silver behind Russia and individually she won silver on balance beam behind Russian Viktoria Listunova, bronze on vault behind McClain and Listunova, and placed eighth in the all-around.

In June Alipio competed at the Junior World Championships Trials where she placed fifth in the all-around, but placed first on balance beam and third on uneven bars; however she was not named to team. Later that month she competed at the American Classic where she won gold in the all-around and on uneven bars, and placed second on balance beam. In July Alipio competed at the U.S. Classic where she finished fifth in the all-around behind Konnor McClain, Sydney Barros, Olivia Greaves, and Skye Blakely. She won silver on the balance beam behind McClain, placed tenth on vault, and eleventh on uneven bars and floor exercise.

=== 2021–22 ===
In November 2021 Alipio made her senior international debut at the Arthur Gander Memorial in Morges, Switzerland. She placed third in the three-event all-around behind Angelina Melnikova of Russia and Taïs Boura of France.

In August 2022 Alipio competed at the National Championships. She finished second on balance beam behind Konnor McClain.

== Collegiate gymnastics career ==
Alipio made her debut for the UCLA Bruins on January 7, 2023 at the Super 16 Invitational.

=== Regular season rankings ===
Season	All-Around	Vault	Uneven Bars	Balance Beam	Floor Exercise
2023	N/A	N/A	N/A	102	N/A
2024	N/A	N/A	N/A	243	N/A
2025	N/A	N/A	N/A	15	N/A
2026	N/A	N/A	151	5	140

=== Career perfect 10.0 ===
Season	Date	Event	Meet
2025	March 22, 2025	Balance beam	Big Ten Championships

== Competitive History ==
Competitive history of Ciena Alipio at the junior level
Year	Event	Team	AA	VT	UB	BB	FX
2017	American Classic		11	19	18	9	4
2017	U.S. Classic		16	16	42	8	10
2017	U.S. National Championships		21	18	15	15	28
2018	American Classic		9	7	16	22	10
2018	U.S. Classic		17	21	35	4	12
2018	U.S. National Championships		16	8	22	2nd place, silver medalist(s)	15
2019	City of Jesolo Trophy	2nd place, silver medalist(s)	8	3rd place, bronze medalist(s)		2nd place, silver medalist(s)	
2019	Jr. World Championships Trials		5				
2019	American Classic		1st place, gold medalist(s)	9	1st place, gold medalist(s)	2nd place, silver medalist(s)	19
2019	U.S. Classic		5	10	11	2nd place, silver medalist(s)	11
2019	U.S. National Championships		6	13	10	2nd place, silver medalist(s)	11

Competitive history of Ciena Alipio at the senior level
Year	Event	Team	AA	VT	UB	BB	FX
2021	Winter Cup		6	16	9	15	6
2021	American Classic				9	8	16
2021	U.S. Classic				19	36	21
2021	U.S. National Championships		22		21	9	25
2021	Arthur Gander Memorial		3rd place, bronze medalist(s)				
2022	Winter Cup		16		11	17	19
2022	U.S. Classic		9		11	12	6
2022	U.S. National Championships		17		18	2nd place, silver medalist(s)	18

Competitive history of Ciena Alipio at the NCAA level
Year	Event	Team	AA	VT	UB	BB	FX
2023	PAC-12 Championships	2nd place, silver medalist(s)				29	
2025	Big Ten Championships	1st place, gold medalist(s)				1st place, gold medalist(s)	
2025	NCAA Championships	2nd place, silver medalist(s)				3rd place, bronze medalist(s)	
2026	Big Ten Championships	1st place, gold medalist(s)					
2026	NCAA Championships	5				6	51
