= Emjae Frazier =

American artistic gymnast

eMjae Frazier
- Born: January 29, 2004 (age 22)

Gymnastics career
- Discipline: Women's artistic gymnastics
- Country represented: United States; (2019–2022)
- College team: California Golden Bears (2023–2025); Florida Gators (2026)
- Club: Parkettes
- Head coaches: Bill and Donna Strauss
Medal record
Representing the California Bears
NCAA Championships
Silver medal – second place	2024 Fort Worth	Team
Representing Florida Gators
NCAA Championships
Bronze medal – third place	2026 Fort Worth	Team
Bronze medal – third place	2026 Fort Worth	All-Around

Emjae Frazier (born January 29, 2004), frequently stylized as eMjae or éMjae, is an American artistic gymnast and a former member of the United States women's national artistic gymnastics team (2019–2022). She is currently competing in collegiate gymnastics for Florida, and previously for California. She is the younger sister of Margzetta Frazier.

== Early life ==
Frazier was born in New Jersey in 2004. She was inspired to start gymnastics by her sister, Margzetta.

== Elite gymnastics career ==
=== Junior: 2018–19 ===
Frazier qualified as an elite gymnast in early 2018. In early July, she competed at the American Classic where she placed 19th in the all-around. Later that month she competed at the 2018 U.S. Classic where she placed 27th in the all-around.

In June 2019, Frazier competed at the American Classic where she placed 23rd in the all-around but third on vault. The following month she competed at the 2019 U.S. Classic where she placed seventh in the all-around. In August Frazier competed at her first U.S. National Championships. She placed ninth in the all-around and was named to the junior national team for the first time. In November she tore three ligaments in her right knee.

=== Senior: 2020–22 ===
Frazier turned senior in 2020. Most competition were canceled or postponed due to the COVID-19 pandemic. However she was selected to compete at the Friendship and Solidarity Meet where she was part of the gold medal winning Solidarity Team.

Frazier started 2021 competing at the 2021 Winter Cup where she placed 21st on the balance beam. In May she competed at the U.S. Classic where she placed 12th in the all-around. At the National Championships Frazier finished 20th in the all-around and was not selected to compete at the Olympic Trials. In October Frazier finished second at the World selection trials behind Kayla DiCello; as a result she was selected to compete at the 2021 World Championships and she was re-added to the national team. While there she finished ninth on floor exercise and 40th on uneven bars; she did not advance to any event finals.

Frazier competed at the 2022 Winter Cup where she placed third in the all-around behind Konnor McClain and Skye Blakely. As a result she was selected to compete at the upcoming DTB Pokal Team Challenge in Stuttgart alongside McClain, Blakely, Nola Matthews, and Ashlee Sullivan. She helped the team finish first. In April Frazier competed at the 2022 City of Jesolo Trophy alongside McClain, Shilese Jones, Zoe Miller, and Elle Mueller. They won the team event with a score 164.065; she placed sixth in the all-around. During event finals she won silver on floor exercise behind McClain.

== Collegiate gymnastics career ==
=== California ===
Frazier began her collegiate career with the California Golden Bears women's gymnastics team. On March 3, 2023, Frazier became the first person on the California Golden Bears women's gymnastics team to receive a perfect 10 for her floor routine.

=== Florida ===
On May 27, 2025, Frazier transferred to Florida. She debuted as a Gator with a strong start to the season helping the Gators win their first meet of the season versus North Carolina, Temple, and West Virginia. She opened the season with 9.925 on floor, and 9.85s on bars and beam. At the 2026 NCAA gymnastic championships, she won bronze in the all around, helping lead Florida to the NCAA team final.

=== Career perfect 10.0 ===
Date	Event	Meet
March 3, 2023	Floor exercise	vs UCLA
January 13, 2024	Balance beam	Sprouts Collegiate Quad
February 25, 2024	Floor exercise	vs UCLA

=== Regular season ranking ===
Season	All-Around	Vault	Uneven Bars	Balance Beam	Floor Exercise
2023	36th	117th	56th	78th	12th
2024	3rd	21st	4th	6th	9th
2025	17th	31st	33rd	39th	34th
2026	N/A	204th	29th	23rd	35th

== Competitive history ==
Year	Event	Team	AA	VT	UB	BB	FX
Junior
2018	American Classic		18	30	20	15	24
2018	U.S. Classic		27	34	21	32	21
2019	American Classic		23	3rd place, bronze medalist(s)	26	22	5
2019	U.S. Classic		7	5	10	19	5
2019	U.S. National Championships		9	10	18	6	8
Senior
2020	Friendship & Solidarity Meet	1st place, gold medalist(s)					
2021	Winter Cup					21	
2021	U.S. Classic		12		21	28	12
2021	U.S. National Championships		20		24	14	13
2021	World Team Trials		2nd place, silver medalist(s)				
2022	Winter Cup		3rd place, bronze medalist(s)		18	2nd place, silver medalist(s)	1st place, gold medalist(s)
2022	DTB Pokal Team Challenge	1st place, gold medalist(s)					
2022	City of Jesolo Trophy	1st place, gold medalist(s)	6				2nd place, silver medalist(s)
NCAA
2023	Pac-12 Championships	3rd place, bronze medalist(s)					
2023	NCAA Championships		14				
2024	Pac-12 Championships	3rd place, bronze medalist(s)	14	4	3rd place, bronze medalist(s)	42	8
2024	NCAA Championships	2nd place, silver medalist(s)	13				10
2025	ACC Championships	2nd place, silver medalist(s)	4	12	3rd place, bronze medalist(s)	4	31
2026	SEC Championships	1st place, gold medalist(s)	7				
2026	NCAA Championships	3rd place, bronze medalist(s)	3rd place, bronze medalist(s)	16	34	9	4
