= 2026 Big Ten Women's Gymnastics Championship =

- Venue: State Farm Center
- Location: Champaign, Illinois
- Date: March 20-21, 2026

Medalists
gold medal	UCLA
silver medal	Michigan State
bronze medal	Minnesota

The 2026 Big Ten Women's Gymnastics Championship was held on March 20-21, 2026 at the State Farm Center, hosted by the University of Illinois Urbana-Champaign in Champaign, Illinois. All three sessions will be televised on the Big Ten Network or as part of the Fox Sports app.

UCLA won its second consecutive Big Ten Championship with an overall score of 198.100. The Bruins also secured the 2026 regular-season crown for a second year in the row. UCLA previously competed in the Pac-12 Conference joining the Big Ten in 2025 and dominating in women's gymnastics.

The winner of the tournament would receive an automatic bid to the 2026 NCAA women's gymnastics tournament.

== Team Results ==
The meet will be conducted in three sessions, with four schools competing on March 20, four schools competing in the afternoon session on March 21, and four schools competing in the evening session on March 21. Team seeding was determined by the final Big Ten regular season standings. Head-to-head results would be used in the event of a tie.

Session 1 (March 20, 6PM CT)
Rank	Team	Vault	Uneven bars	Balance beam	Floor	Total
9	Washington	48.650	48.950	48.700	49.175	195.475
10	Rutgers	48.750	48.975	48.700	49.275	195.700
11	Nebraska	48.650	48.925	48.750	48.750	195.075
12	Illinois	48.875	48.675	48.500	49.075	195.125

Session II (March 21, 12PM CT)
Rank	Team	Vault	Uneven bars	Balance beam	Floor	Total
5	Penn State	48.950	48.100	48.825	49.125	196.000
6	Ohio State	49.025	48.925	48.900	49.400	196.250
7	Iowa	48.875	49.225	49.275	49.325	196.700
8	Maryland	48.825	48.550	48.700	49.225	195.300

Session III (March 21, 5PM CT
Rank	Team	Vault	Uneven bars	Balance beam	Floor	Total
1	Minnesota	49.300	49.375	48.575	49.650	196.900
2	Michigan	49.100	49.125	49.125	49.550	196.800
3	UCLA	49.450	49.550	49.425	49.675	198.100
4	Michigan State	49.250	49.400	49.375	49.450	197.475

=== Final results ===
Rank	Team	Vault	Uneven bars	Balance beam	Floor	Totals
1st place, gold medalist(s)	UCLA	49.450	49.550	49.425	49.675	198.100
2nd place, silver medalist(s)	Michigan State	49.250	49.400	49.375	49.450	197.475
3rd place, bronze medalist(s)	Minnesota	49.300	49.375	48.575	49.650	196.900
4	Michigan	49.100	49.125	49.125	49.550	196.800
5	Iowa	48.875	49.225	49.275	49.325	196.700
6	Ohio State	49.025	48.925	48.900	49.400	196.250
7	Penn State	48.950	48.100	48.825	49.125	196.000
8	Rutgers	48.750	48.975	48.700	49.275	195.700
9	Washington	48.650	48.950	48.700	49.175	195.475
10	Maryland	48.825	48.550	48.700	49.225	195.300
11	Illinois	48.875	48.675	48.500	49.075	195.125
12	Nebraska	48.650	48.925	48.750	48.750	195.075

== Individual results ==
=== Medalists ===
Event	Gold	Silver	Bronze
Individual all-around	Jordan Chiles (UCLA)	Arianna Ostrum (Minnesota) Nikki Smith (Michigan State) Tiana Sumanasekera (UCLA)	Not awarded
Vault	Arianna Ostrum (Minnesota) Riley Jenkins (UCLA)	Not awarded	Jordan Chiles (UCLA) Sage Kellerman (Michigan State)
Uneven bars	Jordan Chiles (UCLA) Aurélie Tran (Iowa) Sydney Barros (UCLA) Sage Kellerman (Michigan State) Jordyn Lyden (Minnesota) Emma Slevin (Minnesota)	Not awarded	Not awarded
Balance beam	Jordan Chiles (UCLA)	Tiana Sumanasekera (UCLA)	Aurélie Tran (Iowa) Sydney Turner (Iowa) Cady Duplissis (Michigan State) Lilia Cosman (Michigan State) Ava Stewart (Minnesota)
Floor	Jordan Chiles (UCLA)	Arianna Ostrum (Minnesota) Nikki Smith (Michigan State) Carly Bauman (Michigan) Ashlee Sullivan (UCLA) JJ Coleman (Ohio State) Jordyn Lyden (Minnesota) Emily Leese (Rutgers) Sophie Swartzmiller (Minnesota) Tiana Sumanasekera (UCLA)	Not awarded

=== All-around ===
Rank	Gymnast	Team	Vault (gymnastics)	Uneven bars	Balance beam	Floor (gymnastics)	Total
1st place, gold medalist(s)	Jordan Chiles	UCLA	9.925	9.950	9.950	10.000	39.825
2nd place, silver medalist(s)	Arianna Ostrum	Minnesota	9.950	9.800	9.875	9.950	39.575
2nd place, silver medalist(s)	Nikki Smith	Michigan State	9.850	9.875	9.900	9.950	39.575
2nd place, silver medalist(s)	Tiana Sumanasekera	UCLA	9.850	9.875	9.925	9.925	39.575
5	Mika Webster-Longin	UCLA	9.900	9.900	9.825	9.925	39.550
6	Aurélie Tran	Iowa	9.800	9.950	9.900	9.875	39.525
7	MaKayla Tucker	Michigan State	9.850	9.850	9.900	9.875	39.475
8	Sophie Schriever	Iowa	9.725	9.900	9.825	9.900	39.350
9	Gabrielle Dildy	Rutgers	9.775	9.900	9.825	9.825	39.325
10	Elizabeth Leary	Penn State	9.700	9.875	9.875	9.825	39.275
11	Tory Vetter	Ohio State	9.800	9.800	9.800	9.825	39.225
12	Kristin Lin	Washington	9.725	9.525	9.950	9.900	39.100
13	Aine Reade	Maryland	9.525	9.725	9.850	9.800	38.975
14	Sydney Turner	Iowa	9.675	9.525	9.750	9.775	38.975
15	Isabel Sikon	Nebraska	9.850	9.675	9.775	9.025	38.525

=== 2026 Big Ten Women’s Gymnastics All-Championships Team ===
A total of 20 gymnasts earned a place on the Big Ten All-Championship Team by virtue of their performance.

==== Vault ====
- Summer Clancy, Illinois
- Sage Kellerman, Michigan State
- Arianna Ostrum, Minnesota
- Jordan Chiles, UCLA
- Riley Jenkins, UCLA

==== Uneven Bars ====
- Aurélie Tran, Iowa
- Sage Kellerman, Michigan State
- Jordyn Lyden, Minnesota
- Emma Slevin, Minnesota
- Sydney Barros, UCLA
- Jordan Chiles, UCLA

==== Balance Beam ====
- Aurélie Tran, Iowa
- Sydney Turner, Iowa
- Lilia Cosman, Michigan State
- Cady Duplissis, Michigan State
- Nikki Smith, Michigan State
- Ava Stewart, Minnesota
- Jordan Chiles, UCLA
- Tiana Sumanasekera, UCLA

==== Floor Exercise ====
- Carly Bauman, Michigan
- Nikki Smith, Michigan State
- Jordyn Lyden, Minnesota
- Arianna Ostrum, Minnesota
- Sophie Swartzmiller, Minnesota
- JJ Coleman, Ohio State
- Emily Leese, Rutgers
- Jordan Chiles, UCLA
- Ashlee Sullivan, UCLA

==== All-Around ====
- Aurélie Tran, Iowa
- Nikki Smith, Michigan State
- Arianna Ostrum, Minnesota
- Jordan Chiles, UCLA
- Tiana Sumanasekera, UCLA
