= Gymnastics at the 2023 Pan American Games – Women's artistic team all-around =

Women's artistic team all-around at the 2023 Pan American Games
- Venue: Training Center for Collective Sport
- Dates: October 22
- Winning score: 165.196

Medalists
| Gold medal | Jordan Chiles; Kayla DiCello; Kaliya Lincoln; Zoe Miller; Tiana Sumanasekera | United States |
| Silver medal | Rebeca Andrade; Jade Barbosa; Carolyne Pedro; Flávia Saraiva; Júlia Soares | Brazil |
| Bronze medal | Cassie Lee; Frédérique Sgarbossa; Ava Stewart; Aurélie Tran; Sydney Turner | Canada |

The women's artistic team final at the 2023 Pan American Games was held on October 22 at the Training Center for Collective Sport in Santiago, Chile. This event also served as the qualification for the all-around and event finals.

== Results ==
=== Team ===
| Rank | Team | Vault (gymnastics) | Uneven bars | Balance beam | Floor (gymnastics) | Total |
|---|---|---|---|---|---|---|
| 1st place, gold medalist(s) | United States | 42.532 (2) | 42.666 (1) | 39.365 (2) | 40.633 (1) | 165.196 |
| 1st place, gold medalist(s) | Jordan Chiles | 14.366 | 14.100 | 13.000 | 13.200 | 165.196 |
| 1st place, gold medalist(s) | Kayla DiCello | 14.066 | 13.800 | 13.066 | 13.633 | 165.196 |
| 1st place, gold medalist(s) | Kaliya Lincoln | 13.933 | | 13.233 | 13.800 | 165.196 |
| 1st place, gold medalist(s) | Zoe Miller | | 14.766 | | | 165.196 |
| 1st place, gold medalist(s) | Tiana Sumanasekera | 14.100 | 12.900 | 13.066 | 13.000 | 165.196 |
| 2nd place, silver medalist(s) | Brazil | 42.900 (1) | 38.866 (2) | 39.665 (1) | 40.133 (2) | 161.564 |
| 2nd place, silver medalist(s) | Rebeca Andrade | 15.100 | 14.300 | 13.566 | | 161.564 |
| 2nd place, silver medalist(s) | Jade Barbosa | 13.800 | 10.933 | 12.600 | 13.333 | 161.564 |
| 2nd place, silver medalist(s) | Carolyne Pedro | 12.766 | 10.400 | | 12.300 | 161.564 |
| 2nd place, silver medalist(s) | Flávia Saraiva | 14.000 | 13.633 | 13.433 | 13.400 | 161.564 |
| 2nd place, silver medalist(s) | Júlia Soares | | | 12.666 | 13.400 | 161.564 |
| 3rd place, bronze medalist(s) | Canada | 39.533 (4) | 37.900 (4) | 39.165 (3) | 37.632 (3) | 154.230 |
| 3rd place, bronze medalist(s) | Cassie Lee | | | 12.033 | 12.333 | 154.230 |
| 3rd place, bronze medalist(s) | Frédérique Sgarbossa | 13.033 | 12.100 | | | 154.230 |
| 3rd place, bronze medalist(s) | Ava Stewart | 13.300 | 12.400 | 13.666 | 12.466 | 154.230 |
| 3rd place, bronze medalist(s) | Aurélie Tran | 13.200 | 13.400 | 12.866 | 12.666 | 154.230 |
| 3rd place, bronze medalist(s) | Sydney Turner | 12.966 | 11.000 | 12.633 | 12.500 | 154.230 |
| 4 | Mexico | 39.765 (3) | 38.199 (3) | 36.498 (4) | 36.133 (4) | 150.595 |
| 4 | Paulina Campos | 11.566 | 12.600 | 11.200 | 11.833 | 150.595 |
| 4 | Natalia Escalera | 13.366 | 12.266 | 11.966 | 12.400 | 150.595 |
| 4 | Cassandra Loustalot | 12.533 | | 12.666 | 10.900 | 150.595 |
| 4 | Alexa Moreno | | 11.633 | | | 150.595 |
| 4 | Ahtziri Sandoval | 13.866 | 13.333 | 11.866 | 11.900 | 150.595 |
| 5 | Colombia | 38.665 (5) | 34.532 (6) | 35.799 (5) | 35.466 (7) | 144.462 |
| 5 | Luisa Blanco | 13.266 | 11.966 | 12.266 | 11.933 | 144.462 |
| 5 | Ginna Escobar | 12.666 | 11.700 | 9.033 | 10.166 | 144.462 |
| 5 | Daira Lamadrid | | 10.866 | 11.700 | | 144.462 |
| 5 | Angelica Mesa | 12.466 | 9.466 | | 11.633 | 144.462 |
| 5 | Yiseth Valenzuela | 12.733 | | 11.833 | 11.900 | 144.462 |
| 6 | Argentina | 38.365 (6) | 35.066 (5) | 35.532 (6) | 35.366 (8) | 144.329 |
| 6 | Milagros Curti Ruiz | 12.833 | 11.200 | 11.466 | 12.433 | 144.329 |
| 6 | Lucila Estarli | 12.766 | 11.100 | 11.933 | 11.100 | 144.329 |
| 6 | Nicole Iribarne | 12.766 | 12.000 | 12.133 | 11.833 | 144.329 |
| 6 | Leila Martínez | 12.000 | 11.866 | 11.366 | 10.233 | 144.329 |
| 6 | Meline Mesropian | | | | | 144.329 |
| 7 | Panama | 36.465 (9) | 34.399 (7) | 33.666 (7) | 35.899 (5) | 140.429 |
| 7 | Valentina Brostella | 12.166 | 11.066 | | 10.433 | 140.429 |
| 7 | Hillary Heron | 11.100 | 11.733 | 10.600 | 12.966 | 140.429 |
| 7 | Lana Herrera | 11.933 | 11.200 | 11.400 | 11.500 | 140.429 |
| 7 | Celia Kuriakuz | | | 11.000 | | 140.429 |
| 7 | Karla Navas | 12.366 | 11.466 | 11.266 | 11.433 | 140.429 |
| 8 | Chile | 36.765 (8) | 33.699 (8) | 31.832 (9) | 35.899 (5) | 138.195 |
| 8 | Bárbara Achondo | 11.366 | 11.433 | 11.033 | 12.633 | 138.195 |
| 8 | Sofía Casella | | 11.066 | 10.933 | 10.966 | 138.195 |
| 8 | Antonia Marihuan | 0.000 | 11.133 | 9.233 | 11.233 | 138.195 |
| 8 | Makarena Pinto | 12.766 | 11.133 | 9.866 | 12.033 | 138.195 |
| 8 | Franchesca Santi | 12.633 | | | | 138.195 |
| 9 | Puerto Rico | 37.432 (7) | 32.666 (9) | 33.066 (8) | 33.932 (9) | 137.096 |
| 9 | Katyna Alicea | | | 8.600 | | 137.096 |
| 9 | Alejandra Álvarez | 12.533 | 10.933 | 11.566 | 10.400 | 137.096 |
| 9 | Karelys Díaz | 12.533 | 11.000 | 9.800 | 11.566 | 137.096 |
| 9 | Stella Diaz Muñiz | 12.366 | 10.733 | 11.700 | 10.866 | 137.096 |
| 9 | Ainhoa Herrero | 11.000 | 9.633 | | 11.500 | 137.096 |

== Qualification results ==
=== Individual all-around ===
| Rank | Gymnast | Vault (gymnastics) | Uneven bars | Balance beam | Floor (gymnastics) | Total | Qual. |
|---|---|---|---|---|---|---|---|
| 1 | Jordan Chiles (USA) | 14.366 | 14.100 | 13.000 | 13.200 | 54.666 | Q |
| 2 | Kayla DiCello (USA) | 14.066 | 13.800 | 13.066 | 13.633 | 54.565 | Q |
| 3 | Flávia Saraiva (BRA) | 14.000 | 13.633 | 13.433 | 13.400 | 54.466 | Q |
| 4 | Tiana Sumanasekera (USA) | 14.100 | 12.900 | 13.066 | 13.000 | 53.066 | – |
| 5 | Aurélie Tran (CAN) | 13.200 | 13.400 | 12.866 | 12.666 | 52.132 | Q |
| 6 | Ava Stewart (CAN) | 13.300 | 12.400 | 13.666 | 12.466 | 51.832 | Q |
| 7 | Ahtziri Sandoval (MEX) | 13.866 | 13.333 | 11.866 | 11.900 | 50.965 | Q |
| 8 | Jade Barbosa (BRA) | 13.800 | 10.933 | 12.600 | 13.333 | 50.666 | Q |
| 9 | Natalia Escalera (MEX) | 13.366 | 12.266 | 11.966 | 12.400 | 49.998 | Q |
| 10 | Luisa Blanco (COL) | 13.266 | 11.966 | 12.266 | 11.933 | 49.431 | Q |
| 11 | Sydney Turner (CAN) | 12.966 | 11.000 | 12.633 | 12.500 | 49.099 | – |
| 12 | Nicole Iribarne (ARG) | 12.766 | 12.000 | 12.133 | 11.833 | 48.732 | – |
| 13 | Milagros Curti Ruiz (ARG) | 12.833 | 11.200 | 11.466 | 12.433 | 47.932 | Q |
| 14 | Lynnzee Brown (HAI) | 13.400 | 11.066 | 11.300 | 11.866 | 47.632 | Q |
| 15 | Paulina Campos (MEX) | 11.566 | 12.600 | 11.200 | 11.833 | 47.199 | – |
| 16 | Lucila Estarli (ARG) | 12.766 | 11.100 | 11.933 | 11.100 | 46.899 | – |
| 17 | Alais Perea (ECU) | 12.633 | 11.700 | 10.833 | 11.533 | 46.699 | Q |
| 18 | Karla Navas (PAN) | 12.366 | 11.466 | 11.266 | 11.433 | 46.531 | Q |
| 19 | Bárbara Achondo (CHI) | 11.366 | 11.433 | 11.033 | 12.633 | 46.465 | Q |
| 20 | Hillary Heron (PAN) | 11.100 | 11.733 | 10.600 | 12.966 | 46.399 | Q |
| 21 | Alexa Grande (ESA) | 12.533 | 10.800 | 11.100 | 11.966 | 46.399 | Q |
| 22 | Lana Herrera (PAN) | 11.933 | 11.200 | 11.400 | 11.500 | 46.033 | – |
| 23 | Makarena Pinto (CHI) | 12.766 | 11.133 | 9.866 | 12.033 | 45.798 | Q |
| 24 | Stella Diaz Muñiz (PUR) | 12.366 | 10.733 | 11.700 | 10.866 | 45.665 | Q |
| 25 | Leila Martínez (ARG) | 12.000 | 11.866 | 11.366 | 10.233 | 45.465 | – |
| 26 | Alejandra Díaz (PUR) | 12.533 | 10.933 | 11.566 | 10.400 | 45.432 | Q |
| 27 | Anya Pilgram (BAR) | 12.800 | 9.900 | 11.400 | 11.266 | 45.366 | Q |
| 28 | Franciny Morales (CRC) | 12.666 | 10.733 | 10.333 | 11.600 | 45.332 | Q |
| 29 | Karelys Diaz (PUR) | 12.533 | 11.000 | 9.800 | 11.566 | 44.899 | – |
| 30 | Deborah Salmina (VEN) | 12.533 | 10.733 | 9.633 | 11.733 | 44.632 | Q |
| 31 | Ashley Bohórquez (ECU) | 11.600 | 11.766 | 9.166 | 11.933 | 44.465 | Q |
| 32 | Anelena Rodríguez (CRC) | 12.333 | 11.533 | 9.166 | 10.833 | 43.865 | R1 |
| 33 | Ginna Escobar (COL) | 12.666 | 11.700 | 9.033 | 10.166 | 43.565 | R2 |
| 34 | Ana Karina Méndez (PER) | 11.933 | 11.900 | 9.166 | 10.066 | 43.065 | R3 |

=== Vault ===
| Rank | Gymnast | Vault 1 | | | | Vault 2 | | | | Total | Qual. |
| Rank | Gymnast | D Score | E Score | Pen. | Score 1 | D Score | E Score | Pen. | Score 2 | Total | Qual. |
|---|---|---|---|---|---|---|---|---|---|---|---|
| 1 | Rebeca Andrade (BRA) | 5.600 | 9.500 | | 15.100 | 5.000 | 9.533 | | 14.533 | 14.816 | Q |
| 2 | Jordan Chiles (USA) | 5.000 | 9.366 | | 14.366 | 4.800 | 9.133 | 0.1 | 13.833 | 14.099 | Q |
| 3 | Ahtziri Sandoval (MEX) | 5.200 | 8.666 | | 13.866 | 4.000 | 8.633 | | 12.633 | 13.249 | Q |
| 4 | Natalia Escalera (MEX) | 4.600 | 8.766 | | 13.366 | 4.400 | 8.566 | | 12.966 | 13.166 | Q |
| 5 | Makarena Pinto (CHI) | 4.600 | 8.166 | | 12.766 | 4.400 | 8.400 | | 12.800 | 12.783 | Q |
| 6 | Lucila Estarli (ARG) | 4.400 | 8.366 | | 12.766 | 3.800 | 8.333 | 0.1 | 12.033 | 12.399 | Q |
| 7 | Camil Betances (DOM) | 4.200 | 8.433 | | 12.633 | 3.800 | 8.300 | | 12.100 | 12.366 | Q |
| 8 | Franchesca Santi (CHI) | 4.200 | 8.433 | | 12.633 | 3.800 | 8.200 | | 12.000 | 12.316 | Q |
| 9 | Alexa Grande (ESA) | 4.200 | 8.333 | | 12.533 | 3.400 | 8.233 | | 11.633 | 12.083 | R1 |
| 10 | Franciny Morales (CRC) | 4.200 | 8.466 | | 12.666 | 3.800 | 7.300 | | 11.100 | 11.883 | R2 |
| 11 | Diana Vasquez (BOL) | 4.200 | 8.300 | | 12.500 | 3.600 | 7.233 | | 10.833 | 11.666 | R3 |

=== Uneven bars ===
| Rank | Gymnast | D Score | E Score | Pen. | Total | Qual. |
|---|---|---|---|---|---|---|
| 1 | Zoe Miller (USA) | 6.400 | 8.366 | | 14.766 | Q |
| 2 | Rebeca Andrade (BRA) | 6.100 | 8.200 | | 14.300 | Q |
| 3 | Jordan Chiles (USA) | 5.900 | 8.200 | | 14.100 | Q |
| 4 | Kayla DiCello (USA) | 5.600 | 8.200 | | 13.800 | – |
| 5 | Flávia Saraiva (BRA) | 5.600 | 8.033 | | 13.633 | Q |
| 6 | Katelyn Jong (USA) | 5.900 | 7.733 | | 13.633 | – |
| 7 | Aurélie Tran (CAN) | 5.300 | 8.100 | | 13.400 | Q |
| 8 | Ahtziri Sandoval (MEX) | 5.500 | 7.833 | | 13.333 | Q |
| 9 | Tiana Sumanasekera (USA) | 5.300 | 7.600 | | 12.900 | – |
| 10 | Paulina Campos (MEX) | 5.300 | 7.300 | | 12.600 | Q |
| 11 | Ava Stewart (CAN) | 5.400 | 7.000 | | 12.400 | Q |
| 12 | Natalia Escalera (MEX) | 5.700 | 6.566 | | 12.266 | – |
| 13 | Frédérique Sgarbossa (CAN) | 4.600 | 7.500 | | 12.100 | – |
| 14 | Nicole Iribarne (ARG) | 4.200 | 7.800 | | 12.000 | R1 |
| 15 | Tyesha Mattis (JAM) | 5.300 | 6.700 | | 12.000 | R2 |
| 16 | Luisa Blanco (COL) | 3.700 | 8.266 | | 11.966 | R3 |

=== Balance beam ===
| Rank | Gymnast | D Score | E Score | Pen. | Total | Qual. |
|---|---|---|---|---|---|---|
| 1 | Ava Stewart (CAN) | 6.000 | 7.666 | | 13.666 | Q |
| 2 | Rebeca Andrade (BRA) | 5.800 | 7.766 | | 13.566 | Q |
| 3 | Flávia Saraiva (BRA) | 5.500 | 7.933 | | 13.433 | Q |
| 4 | Kaliya Lincoln (USA) | 5.500 | 7.733 | | 13.233 | Q |
| 5 | Kayla DiCello (USA) | 5.700 | 7.366 | | 13.066 | Q |
| 6 | Tiana Sumanasekera (USA) | 6.100 | 7.066 | 0.1 | 13.066 | – |
| 7 | Jordan Chiles (USA) | 5.200 | 7.800 | | 13.000 | – |
| 8 | Aurélie Tran (CAN) | 5.000 | 7.866 | | 12.866 | Q |
| 9 | Júlia Soares (BRA) | 5.400 | 7.366 | 0.1 | 12.666 | – |
| 10 | Cassandra Loustalot (MEX) | 5.400 | 7.266 | | 12.666 | Q |
| 11 | Sydney Turner (CAN) | 5.300 | 7.333 | | 12.633 | – |
| 12 | Jade Barbosa (BRA) | 5.100 | 7.500 | | 12.600 | – |
| 13 | Luisa Blanco (COL) | 5.200 | 7.166 | 0.1 | 12.266 | Q |
| 14 | Nicole Iribarne (ARG) | 4.600 | 7.533 | | 12.133 | R1 |
| 15 | Cassie Lee (CAN) | 4.900 | 7.133 | | 12.033 | – |
| 16 | Natalia Escalera (MEX) | 5.300 | 6.666 | | 11.966 | R2 |
| 17 | Lucila Estarli (ARG) | 4.600 | 7.333 | | 11.933 | R3 |

=== Floor exercise ===
| Rank | Gymnast | D Score | E Score | Pen. | Total | Qual. |
|---|---|---|---|---|---|---|
| 1 | Kaliya Lincoln (USA) | 6.100 | 8.000 | 0.3 | 13.800 | Q |
| 2 | Kayla DiCello (USA) | 5.500 | 8.133 | | 13.633 | Q |
| 3 | Flávia Saraiva (BRA) | 5.400 | 8.100 | 0.1 | 13.400 | Q |
| 4 | Júlia Soares (BRA) | 5.400 | 8.000 | | 13.400 | Q |
| 5 | Jade Barbosa (BRA) | 5.500 | 7.833 | | 13.333 | – |
| 6 | Jordan Chiles (USA) | 6.000 | 7.300 | 0.1 | 13.200 | – |
| 7 | Tiana Sumanasekera (USA) | 5.700 | 7.300 | | 13.000 | – |
| 8 | Hillary Heron (PAN) | 5.500 | 7.466 | | 12.966 | Q |
| 9 | Aurélie Tran (CAN) | 4.800 | 7.866 | | 12.666 | Q |
| 10 | Bárbara Achondo (CHI) | 4.600 | 8.033 | | 12.633 | Q |
| 11 | Sydney Turner (CAN) | 4.500 | 8.000 | | 12.500 | Q |
| 12 | Ava Stewart (CAN) | 4.800 | 7.666 | | 12.466 | – |
| 13 | Milagros Curti Ruiz (ARG) | 4.800 | 7.733 | 0.1 | 12.433 | R1 |
| 14 | Natalia Escalera (MEX) | 5.300 | 7.500 | 0.4 | 12.400 | R2 |
| 15 | Cassie Lee (CAN) | 4.800 | 7.633 | 0.1 | 12.333 | – |
| 16 | Carolyne Pedro (BRA) | 5.000 | 7.300 | | 12.300 | – |
| 17 | Makarena Pinto (CHI) | 4.800 | 7.233 | | 12.033 | R3 |
