= Sydney Turner (gymnast) =

Canadian artistic gymnast

- Full name: Sydney Leslie Turner
- Born: August 17, 2005 (age 21) New Westminster, British Columbia, Canada

Gymnastics career
- Discipline: Women's artistic gymnastics
- Country represented: Canada; (2020 – present)
- College team: Iowa Hawkeyes (2025–2028)
- Training location: Port Coquitlam, British Columbia
- Club: TAG Sport Centre
- Head coach: Barbara Eva Fraser
Medal record
Women's artistic gymnastics
Representing Canada
World Championships
Bronze medal – third place	2022 Liverpool	Team
Pan American Games
Bronze medal – third place	2023 Santiago	Team
Pan American Championships
Silver medal – second place	2024 Santa Marta	Team
Silver medal – second place	2024 Santa Marta	Uneven bars
Bronze medal – third place	2022 Rio de Janeiro	Team
Bronze medal – third place	2022 Rio de Janeiro	Uneven bars
Bronze medal – third place	2023 Medellín	Team
Bronze medal – third place	2024 Santa Marta	Balance beam
FIG World Cup
Event / 1st / 2nd / 3rd; World Challenge Cup / 0 / 2 / 1

Sydney Leslie Turner (born August 17, 2005) is a Canadian artistic gymnast. She was part of Canada's historic team bronze medal at the 2022 World Championships, and she won a team bronze medal at the 2023 Pan American Games. She is a six-time Pan American Championships medalist. She was an alternate for Canada's 2024 Olympic team.

== Early life ==
Turner was born on August 17, 2005, in New Westminster, British Columbia, to parents Kerrie and Scott Turner. Her aunt is a 1991 Pan American Games silver medalist in swimming. She started artistic gymnastics at 15 months old and began competing at 6 years old. She also trained in trampoline gymnastics and competed at the national level in tumbling.

== Elite gymnastics career ==
=== Novice and junior ===
Turner missed five months of training in 2017 due to spondylolisthesis and spondylosis. She won a silver medal in the novice division at the 2018 Elite Canada. She made her international debut at the 2019 International Gymnix and finished 36th. Then at the 2019 Canadian Championships, she finished sixth in the junior all-around. She won a bronze medal on the balance beam at the 2019 Tournoi International.

Turner joined the junior Canadian national team in 2020. She finished fifth in the junior all-around at the 2020 Elite Canada. She also finished fifth at the 2020 International Gymnix, and she won a bronze medal with the Canadian team.

=== Senior ===
==== 2021 ====
Turner became age-eligible for senior competitions in 2021. She finished ninth in the all-around at her first senior-level Canadian Championships. Then at the Hungarian Grand Prix, she won a gold medal on the balance beam and bronze medals on the vault and floor exercise. She also won the balance beam gold medal at the Gymnova Cup, where she also won the all-around silver medal behind Tisha Volleman.

==== 2022 ====
Turner won the all-around bronze medal at the 2022 Elite Canada. She then competed in the DTB Pokal Stuttgart Team Challenge and helped Canada finish fourth. At the Canadian Championships, she finished fifth in the all-around and won a silver medal on the uneven bars behind Rose-Kaying Woo. She competed at the Pan American Championships in Rio de Janeiro, winning team bronze and another bronze on the uneven bars.

Turner won three medals at the Szombathely World Challenge Cup– silver on uneven bars and balance beam and bronze on floor exercise. At the 2022 World Championships in Liverpool, she won team bronze - Canada's first ever World team medal - alongside teammates Ellie Black, Denelle Pedrick, Laurie Denommée, Emma Spence and Shallon Olsen. This result also secured Canada a full team berth for the 2024 Summer Olympics.

==== 2023 ====
Turner only competed on the balance beam at the 2023 Elite Canada and won the bronze medal. She then competed at the DTB Pokal Team Challenge with the Canadian team that finished sixth. Then at the City of Jesolo Trophy, she won a bronze medal on the floor exercise. She finished fifth in the all-around at the Canadian Championships and won the floor exercise silver medal. She competed at the Pan American Championships in Medellín, winning team bronze alongside Jenna Lalonde, Cassie Lee, Aurélie Tran and Evandra Zlobec. Then at the Pan American Games, she won another team bronze with teammates Lee, Tran, Frederique Sgarbossa, and Ava Stewart.

==== 2024 ====
Turner won a silver medal on the balance beam at the International Gymnix. She then competed at the 2024 Pan American Championships and won a silver medal with the Canadian team. Individually, she won a silver medal on the uneven bars and a bronze medal on the balance beam. At the Canadian Championships, she finished fifth in the all-around. She was named Canada's second alternate for the 2024 Summer Olympics.

== NCAA gymnastics career ==
Turner committed to the Iowa Hawkeyes for collegiate gymnastics. She helped Iowa finish fifth at the 2025 Big Ten Championships. During her freshman season, she set career-highs of 9.900 on vault and 9.925 on uneven bars.

== Competitive history ==
Competitive history of Sydney Turner at the novice and junior level
Year	Event	Team	AA	VT	UB	BB	FX
2017
2017	Elite Canada		10				
2018
2018	Elite Canada		2nd place, silver medalist(s)				
2019
2019	International Gymnix		36				
2019	Canadian Championships		6				
2019	Tournoi International		4		6	3rd place, bronze medalist(s)	
2019	Elite Gym Massilia		54				
2020
2020	Elite Canada		5			2nd place, silver medalist(s)	
2020	International Gymnix	3rd place, bronze medalist(s)	5	4	5		4

Competitive history of Sydney Turner at the senior level
Year	Event	Team	AA	VT	UB	BB	FX
2021
2021	Canadian Championships		9				
2021	Hungarian Grand Prix			3rd place, bronze medalist(s)	4	1st place, gold medalist(s)	3rd place, bronze medalist(s)
2021	Gymnova Cup		2nd place, silver medalist(s)		5	1st place, gold medalist(s)	
2022
2022	Elite Canada		3rd place, bronze medalist(s)		2nd place, silver medalist(s)	1st place, gold medalist(s)	
2022	DTB Pokal Team Challenge	4					
2022	Canadian Championships		5		2nd place, silver medalist(s)		
2022	Pan American Championships	3rd place, bronze medalist(s)	4		3rd place, bronze medalist(s)	4	
2022	Szombathely World Challenge Cup				2nd place, silver medalist(s)	2nd place, silver medalist(s)	3rd place, bronze medalist(s)
2022	World Championships	3rd place, bronze medalist(s)					
2023
2023	Elite Canada					3rd place, bronze medalist(s)	
2023	DTB Pokal Team Challenge	6					
2023	City of Jesolo Trophy	4	5		5		3rd place, bronze medalist(s)
2023	Canadian Championships		5				2nd place, silver medalist(s)
2023	Pan American Championships	3rd place, bronze medalist(s)	9		6		
2023	Pan American Games	3rd place, bronze medalist(s)					7
2024
2024	International Gymnix				4	2nd place, silver medalist(s)	
2024	Pan American Championships	2nd place, silver medalist(s)			2nd place, silver medalist(s)	3rd place, bronze medalist(s)	
2024	Canadian Championships		5				

Competitive history of Sydney Turner at the NCAA level
Year	Event	Team	AA	VT	UB	BB	FX
2026	Big Ten Championship	5	14			3rd place, bronze medalist(s)	
