= 2026 NCAA women's gymnastics tournament =

Collegiate gymnastics competition

- Venue: Dickies Arena (semi-finals and final)
- Location: Fort Worth, Texas
- Dates: April 1 - April 18
- Teams: 36
- Winning score: 198.1625

Medalists
gold medal	Oklahoma
silver medal	LSU
bronze medal	Florida

The 2026 NCAA women's gymnastics tournament was the 43rd NCAA women's gymnastics tournament, the annual women's gymnastics championship contested by teams of the member associations of NCAA. The first and second rounds and regional final were hosted on campuses from April 1 to April 5, 2026. The semi-final and final were held at Dickies Arena in Fort Worth, Texas from April 16 to April 18, 2026.

== Format ==
The eight lowest seeded teams competed in the first round. Winners advanced to the second round, with 32 total teams at four regional sites. The top two teams from each region moved on to the semi-finals in Fort Worth, Texas. The top two teams in each semi-final advanced to the "Four on the Floor" for the team national title.

== Bracket ==
First round
April 2 – Corvallis
San Jose State	195.500
Washington	195.550
April 2 – Lexington
Rutgers	196.200
Central Michigan	195.700
April 1 – Baton Rouge
Air Force	194.475
Nebraska	195.600
April 1 – Tempe
Arizona	194.900
Arizona State	195.425

Second round
April 3 – Corvallis
5 Alabama 12 Utah	197.225 197.500
Denver Oregon State	195.950 196.375
April 3 – Corvallis
4 UCLA 13 Minnesota	197.450 196.975
Iowa Washington	196.750 195.850
April 3 – Lexington
8 Missouri 9 Arkansas	196.875 197.175
NC State Maryland	195.700 195.775
April 3 – Lexington
1 Oklahoma 16 Kentucky	197.875 196.175
Ohio State Rutgers	196.550 196.300
April 2 – Baton Rouge
7 Stanford 10 Michigan	197.175 196.600
North Carolina Utah State	196.250 195.750
April 2 – Baton Rouge
2 LSU 15 Clemson	198.375 196.800
Auburn Nebraska	195.500 195.000
April 2 – Tempe
6 Georgia 11 Michigan State	197.125 197.350
BYU Southern Utah	196.250 195.725
April 2 – Tempe
3 Florida 14 California	198.125 196.675
Penn State Arizona State	196.200 196.050

Regional final
April 5 – Corvallis
5 Alabama 12 Utah	197.175 197.500
4 UCLA 13 Minnesota	197.725 197.625
April 5 – Lexington
8 Missouri 9 Arkansas	197.225 197.450
1 Oklahoma Ohio State	198.350 196.700
April 4 – Baton Rouge
7 Stanford 10 Michigan	197.225 196.750
2 LSU 15 Clemson	197.825 197.150
April 4 – Tempe
6 Georgia 11 Michigan State	197.750 197.000
3 Florida 14 California	198.050 196.975

Semi-finals
April 16 – Fort Worth
1 Oklahoma 4 UCLA	198.3000 197.2750
9 Arkansas 13 Minnesota	196.9625 197.4625
April 16 – Fort Worth
2 LSU 3 Florida	197.4375 197.7875
6 Georgia 7 Stanford	197.2625 196.9375

Final
April 18 – Fort Worth
1 Oklahoma 13 Minnesota	198.1625 197.3750
2 LSU 3 Florida	198.0750 197.6875

== Regional results ==
=== Baton Rouge Regional ===
First round - April 1 3PM ET (ESPN+)

Seed	School	Vault	Bars	Beam	Floor	Overall
–	Air Force	48.775	48.000	48.700	49.000	194.475
–	Nebraska	49.025	48.675	48.875	49.025	195.600

Second round (Session 1) - April 2 2PM ET (ESPN+)

Seed	School	Vault	Bars	Beam	Floor	Overall
7	Stanford	49.100	49.325	49.200	49.550	197.175
10	Michigan	48.975	49.150	49.075	49.400	196.600
–	North Carolina	49.125	49.100	48.800	49.225	196.250
–	Utah State	49.000	48.925	48.725	49.100	195.750

Second round (Session 2) - April 2 8PM ET (ESPN+)

Seed	School	Vault	Bars	Beam	Floor	Overall
2	LSU	49.475	49.625	49.575	49.700	198.375
15	Clemson	49.225	49.200	49.225	49.150	196.800
–	Auburn	49.250	47.975	49.000	49.275	195.500
–	Nebraska	48.350	48.875	48.650	49.125	195.000

Regional Final - April 4 6PM ET (ESPN+)

Seed	School	Vault	Bars	Beam	Floor	Overall
2	LSU	49.450	49.300	49.425	49.650	197.825
7	Stanford	49.325	49.400	48.950	49.550	197.225
10	Michigan	49.300	49.250	49.175	49.425	196.750
15	Clemson	49.100	49.100	49.175	49.375	197.150

=== Corvallis Regional ===
First round- April 2 5PM ET (ESPN+)

Seed	School	Vault	Bars	Beam	Floor	Overall
–	San Jose State	48.775	49.000	48.675	49.050	195.500
–	Washington	48.725	49.150	48.550	49.125	195.550

Second round (Session 1) - April 3 4PM ET (ESPN+)

Seed	School	Vault	Bars	Beam	Floor	Overall
5	Alabama	49.175	49.525	49.175	49.350	197.225
12	Utah	49.350	49.350	49.350	49.450	197.500
–	Denver	48.975	48.750	48.925	49.300	195.950
–	Oregon State	48.850	49.350	48.925	49.250	196.375

Second round (Session 2) - April 3 10PM ET (ESPN+)

Seed	School	Vault	Bars	Beam	Floor	Overall
4	UCLA	49.350	49.225	49.325	49.450	197.450
13	Minnesota	49.125	49.400	49.450	49.000	196.975
–	Iowa	49.050	49.575	48.975	49.150	196.750
–	Washington	48.625	49.125	48.900	49.200	195.850

Regional Final - April 5 8PM ET (ESPN+)

Seed	School	Vault	Bars	Beam	Floor	Overall
4	UCLA	49.350	49.400	49.350	49.625	197.725
5	Alabama	49.125	49.375	49.325	49.350	197.175
12	Utah	49.350	49.325	49.300	49.525	197.500
13	Minnesota	49.375	49.275	49.325	49.450	197.625

=== Lexington Regional ===
First round - April 2 2PM ET (ESPN+)

Seed	School	Vault	Bars	Beam	Floor	Overall
–	Central Michigan	48.725	48.975	48.700	49.300	195.700
–	Rutgers	49.100	48.825	49.00	49.275	196.200

Second round (Session 1) - April 3 1PM ET (ESPN+)

Seed	School	Vault	Bars	Beam	Floor	Overall
8	Missouri	49.275	49.200	48.950	49.450	196.875
9	Arkansas	49.250	49.375	49.150	49.400	197.175
–	NC State	48.950	48.925	48.700	49.125	195.700
–	Maryland	49.000	48.825	48.925	49.025	195.775

Second round (Session 1) - April 3 7PM ET (ESPN+)

Seed	School	Vault	Bars	Beam	Floor	Overall
1	Oklahoma	49.450	49.525	49.425	49.475	197.875
16	Kentucky	49.150	49.250	48.450	49.325	196.175
–	Ohio State	49.550	48.850	48.975	49.175	196.550
–	Rutgers	49.100	49.025	48.800	49.375	196.300

Regional Final - April 5 5PM ET (ESPN+)

Seed	School	Vault	Bars	Beam	Floor	Overall
1	Oklahoma	49.525	49.475	49.750	49.600	198.350
8	Missouri	49.225	49.300	49.250	49.450	197.225
9	Arkansas	49.275	49.350	49.425	49.400	197.450
–	Ohio State	49.400	49.175	49.050	49.075	196.770

=== Tempe Regional ===
First round - April 1 5PM ET (ESPN+)

Seed	School	Vault	Bars	Beam	Floor	Overall
–	Arizona	48.950	49.000	48.000	48.950	194.900
–	Arizona State	49.050	48.550	48.925	48.900	195.425

Second round (Session 1) - April 2 4PM ET (ESPN+)

Seed	School	Vault	Bars	Beam	Floor	Overall
6	Georgia	49.250	49.425	48.825	49.625	197.125
11	Michigan State	49.575	49.200	49.075	49.500	197.350
–	BYU	49.100	48.975	48.975	49.200	196.250
–	Southern Utah	48.450	48.825	49.125	49.225	195.725

Second round (Session 2) - April 2 10PM ET (ESPN+)

Seed	School	Vault	Bars	Beam	Floor	Overall
3	Florida	49.600	49.625	49.450	49.450	198.125
14	California	49.050	49.200	49.050	49.375	196.675
–	Penn State	49.025	48.800	49.225	49.150	196.200
–	Arizona State	48.975	49.000	49.100	48.975	196.050

Regional Final - April 4 8PM ET (ESPN+)

Seed	School	Vault	Bars	Beam	Floor	Overall
3	Florida	49.375	49.575	49.550	49.550	198.050
6	Georgia	49.425	49.525	49.250	49.550	197.750
11	Michigan State	49.325	49.375	48.925	49.375	197.000
14	California	49.150	49.375	49.025	49.425	196.975

== Individual qualifiers ==
2026 NCAA women's gymnastics tournament individual qualifiers
All-around	Vault	Uneven bars	Balance beam	Floor exercise
Maggie Slife (Air Force)	Gwen Fink (North Carolina)	Sophia Diaz (Michigan)	Carly Bauman (Michigan)	Brie Clark (Clemson)
Nikki Smith (Michigan State)	Sage Kellerman (Michigan State)		Abigayle Martin (Arizona)	Gabi Ortiz (Michigan State)
Tory Vetter (Ohio State)	Cameron Smith (Ohio State)	Hannah Horton (Missouri)	Delaynee Rodriguez (Kentucky)	Creslyn Brose (Kentucky)
Avery Neff (Utah)	Shyla Bhatia (Denver)	Aurélie Tran (Iowa)	Ana Padarariu (Utah)	Ella Zirbes (Utah)

Individual qualifiers are determined by the highest all-around scorer and the top event specialist on each apparatus from non-advancing teams earn a spot at nationals.

== NCAA championship ==
=== Semi-finals ===
The top two teams from the Baton Rouge and Tempe Regionals competed in the first semifinal, and the top two teams from the Corvallis and Lexington Regionals competed in the second semifinal.

Semifinal I and II aired on ESPN2/ESPN+ on April 16 at 4:30PM and 9PM ET, respectively.

Semifinal I - April 16 at 4:30 PM ET (ESPN2)
Seed	School	Vault	Bars	Beam	Floor	Total
2	LSU	49.4750	49.1875	49.2500	49.5250	197.4375
3	Florida	49.2250	49.6625	49.4625	49.4375	197.7875
6	Georgia	49.3250	49.1500	49.2500	49.5375	197.2625
7	Stanford	48.8750	49.2875	49.5250	49.2500	196.9375

Semifinal II - April 16 at 9 PM ET (ESPN2)
Seed	School	Vault	Bars	Beam	Floor	Total
1	Oklahoma	49.7500	49.4750	49.5375	49.5375	198.3000
13	Minnesota	49.2500	49.3875	49.3875	49.4375	197.4625
4	UCLA	48.9750	49.2625	49.4875	49.5500	197.2750
9	Arkansas	49.3750	49.2000	49.0875	49.3000	196.9625

The top two teams from each semifinal advanced to the National Championship, which was televised live on ABC on April 18 at 4:00 pm ET.

=== Final April 18 4PM ET (ABC) ===
Rank	Team	Vault (gymnastics)	Uneven bars	Balance beam	Floor (gymnastics)	Total
1st place, gold medalist(s)	Oklahoma	49.6000	49.4875	49.4375	49.6375	198.1625
1st place, gold medalist(s)	Elizabeth Blessey	9.8375				198.1625
1st place, gold medalist(s)	Mackenzie Estep	9.8625	9.9375		9.9125	198.1625
1st place, gold medalist(s)	Addison Fatta			9.7375		198.1625
1st place, gold medalist(s)	Elle Mueller			9.8625	9.9375	198.1625
1st place, gold medalist(s)	Ella Murphy		9.9125	9.9375	9.8750	198.1625
1st place, gold medalist(s)	Lily Pederson	9.9875	9.8500	9.9500	9.9375	198.1625
1st place, gold medalist(s)	Hannah Scheible	9.9625	9.8625			198.1625
1st place, gold medalist(s)	Caitlin Smith		9.9000			198.1625
1st place, gold medalist(s)	Faith Torrez	9.9000	9.8750	9.9500	9.9500	198.1625
1st place, gold medalist(s)	Keira Wells	9.8875		9.0500	9.9000	198.1625
2nd place, silver medalist(s)	LSU	49.4750	49.6125	49.4750	49.5125	198.0750
2nd place, silver medalist(s)	Nina Ballou				9.8750	198.0750
2nd place, silver medalist(s)	Courtney Blackson		9.9125			198.0750
2nd place, silver medalist(s)	Kailin Chio	10.0000	9.9000	9.9000	9.9000	198.0750
2nd place, silver medalist(s)	Kylie Coen				9.8625	198.0750
2nd place, silver medalist(s)	Ashley Cowan		9.9250			198.0750
2nd place, silver medalist(s)	Amari Drayton	9.8750		9.8750	9.9375	198.0750
2nd place, silver medalist(s)	Emily Innes				9.8250	198.0750
2nd place, silver medalist(s)	Kaliya Lincoln	9.8000		9.8275	9.9375	198.0750
2nd place, silver medalist(s)	Konnor McClain	9.8875	9.9500	9.9500		198.0750
2nd place, silver medalist(s)	Madison Ulrich		9.8875			198.0750
2nd place, silver medalist(s)	Lexi Zeiss	9.8375	9.9250	9.2375		198.0750
3rd place, bronze medalist(s)	Florida	49.2500	49.6000	49.3875	49.4500	197.6875
3rd place, bronze medalist(s)	Alyssa Arana			9.1500		197.6875
3rd place, bronze medalist(s)	Skye Blakely		9.9500	9.9125	9.9125	197.6875
3rd place, bronze medalist(s)	Kayla DiCello	9.8500	9.8875	9.9000	9.9125	197.6875
3rd place, bronze medalist(s)	Gabby Disidore				9.8625	197.6875
3rd place, bronze medalist(s)	Skylar Draser	9.8250		9.8375		197.6875
3rd place, bronze medalist(s)	Danie Ferris	9.8000			9.8750	197.6875
3rd place, bronze medalist(s)	eMjae Frazier	9.8750	9.9125	9.8000	9.8875	197.6875
3rd place, bronze medalist(s)	Selena Harris-Miranda	9.8750	9.9500	9.9375	9.9000	197.6875
3rd place, bronze medalist(s)	Riley McCusker		9.8375			197.6875
3rd place, bronze medalist(s)	Anya Pilgram	9.8250	9.9000			197.6875
4	Minnesota	49.2750	49.2625	49.4500	49.3875	197.3750
4	Teryn Crump	9.8750	9.7875			197.3750
4	Giana Gerdes	9.9000	9.8000			197.3750
4	Leah Gonsiorowski				9.9000	197.3750
4	Jordyn Lyden		9.8375	9.9125	9.9125	197.3750
4	Sarah Moraw	9.7750		9.8500		197.3750
4	Arianna Ostrum	9.8125	9.9000	9.8750	9.9000	197.3750
4	Lauren Pearl			9.4375		197.3750
4	Brooklyn Rowray			9.9125	9.8125	197.3750
4	Lacie Saltzmann		9.8375		9.7875	197.3750
4	Emma Slevin	9.8500	9.8875			197.3750
4	Ava Stewart	9.8375		9.9000		197.3750
4	Sophie Swartzmiller				9.8625	197.3750

== Individual results ==
=== Medalists ===
Event	Gold	Silver	Bronze
Individual all-around	Faith Torrez (Oklahoma)	Kailin Chio (LSU)	eMjae Frazier (Florida)
Vault	Keira Wells (Oklahoma)	Kailin Chio (LSU); Kaliya Lincoln (LSU)	Not awarded
Uneven bars	Riley McCusker (Florida)	Skye Blakely (Florida); Aurélie Tran (Iowa)	Not awarded
Balance beam	Brooklyn Rowray (Minnesota)	Ana Bărbosu (Stanford); Jordan Chiles (UCLA); Konnor McClain (LSU); Faith Torrez (Oklahoma)	Not awarded
Floor	Jordan Chiles (UCLA)	Kailin Chio (LSU)	Faith Torrez (Oklahoma)

=== All-around ===
Rank	Gymnast	Vault (gymnastics)	Uneven bars	Balance beam	Floor (gymnastics)	Total
1st place, gold medalist(s)	Faith Torrez (Oklahoma)	9.9375	9.9500	9.9500	9.9500	39.7875
2nd place, silver medalist(s)	Kailin Chio (LSU)	9.9625	9.8000	9.8875	9.9625	39.6125
3rd place, bronze medalist(s)	eMjae Frazier (Florida)	9.8750	9.8250	9.9250	9.9375	39.5625
4	Arianna Ostrum (Minnesota)	9.9250	9.8125	9.9000	9.9000	39.5375
4	Kayla DiCello (Florida)	9.8625	9.9000	9.8875	9.8875	39.5375
6	Lily Pederson (Oklahoma)	9.9500	9.8500	9.8750	9.8500	39.5250
7	Avery Neff (Utah)	9.8750	9.8000	9.9000	9.9375	39.5125
8	Nikki Smith (Michigan St.)	9.8500	9.7875	9.9250	9.9125	39.4750
9	Morgan Price (Arkansas)	9.9000	9.9125	9.8250	9.8250	39.4625
9	Selena Harris-Miranda (Florida)	9.8125	9.9250	9.8875	9.8375	39.4625
9	Levi Jung-Ruivivar (Stanford)	9.7625	9.9000	9.93745	9.8625	39.4625
12	Tiana Sumanasekera (UCLA)	9.8500	9.8875	9.8250	9.8875	39.4500
13	Maggie Slife (Air Force)	9.8500	9.8875	9.8500	9.8375	39.4250
14	Tory Vetter (Ohio State)	9.7875	9.7875	9.8875	9.9000	39.3625
15	Ana Bărbosu (Stanford)	9.7000	9.8375	9.9500	9.8500	39.3375
16	Anna Roberts (Stanford)	9.6000	9.8625	9.9000	9.8875	39.2500
17	Mika Webster-Longin (UCLA)	9.5875	9.8625	9.8625	9.8875	39.2000
18	Jordan Chiles (UCLA)	9.8875	9.3625	9.9500	9.9750	39.1750
19	Hailey Klein (Arkansas)	9.8125	9.8000	9.7875	9.0500	38.4500
