= Missouri Tigers women's gymnastics =

Women's gymnastics team of the University of Missouri

- Founded: 1980; 46 years ago
- University: University of Missouri
- Head coach: Shannon Welker (12th season)
- Conference: SEC; Division I Division
- Location: Columbia, Missouri
- Home arena: Mizzou Arena (Capacity: 15,061)
- Nickname: Mizzou; Tigers
- Colors: Black and gold

Four on the Floor appearances
- 1; 2025

NCAA Tournament appearances
- 34 (1982, 1983, 1984, 1985, 1986, 1988, 1990, 1991, 1992, 1993, 1994, 2000, 2001, 2002, 2003, 2004, 2005, 2006, 2007, 2008, 2009, 2010, 2011, 2012, 2015, 2016, 2017, 2018, 2019, 2021, 2022, 2023, 2024, 2025)

The Missouri Tigers women's gymnastics team represents the University of Missouri in NCAA Division I women's gymnastics. The team competes in the Southeastern Conference and is coached by Shannon Welker. The team's home venue is the Mizzou Arena.

== History ==
The program was founded in 1980. The Tigers made their first NCAA regional in 1982 and their first NCAA semi-final in 2010.

Shannon Welker was appointed head coach in 2014. Since 2015 the team has made 10 consecutive NCAA regional appearances. In 2022 the Tigers made their second ever NCAA semi final.

They finished third at the 2025 NCAA Championship Finals, reaching the final for the first time in program history. They were originally awarded fourth place, but after an inquiry into Amy Weir's score on beam, Missouri's team score increased enough to raise them to third place ahead of Utah. Helen Hu also made history, earning first place on balance beam.

== Championships ==
Missouri Tigers Individual NCAA Championship Titles
Gymnast	All-Around	Vault	Uneven Bars	Balance Beam	Floor Exercise
Helen Hu				2025	

== NCAA Championship appearances ==
Missouri Tigers Four on the Floor Appearances
Year	Finish
2025	3rd

== Arena and facilities ==
=== Mizzou Arena ===
The Tigers announced that they would change their home venue from Hearnes Center to Mizzou Arena for the 2026 season. Mizzou Arena has a capacity of 15,061.

=== Hearnes Center ===
Missouri gymnastics competed at the 13,611 capacity Hearnes Center from the program’s first season in 1980 until 2025.

== Head coaches ==
Name	Year
Jake Jacobson	1980–2012
Rob Drass	2000–2013
Shannon Welker	2014–present

== 2026 Roster ==
Name	Height	Year	Hometown
Ayla Acevedo	5-3	SO.	Virginia Beach, VA
Grace Anne Davis	5-0	GR	Albertville, AL
Kimarra Echols	5-0	FR	Henderson, NV
Dakota Essenpries	5-2	JR	Adrian, MO
Makayla Green	5-3	GR	Mays Landing, NJ
Kennedy Griffin	5-6	JR	Strongsville, OH
Hannah Horton	5-1	JR	Brooklyn Park, MN
Railey Jackson	5-1	SO	Park Forest, IL
Olivia Kelly	5-6	SO	Bronx, NY
Bryce Kupbens	5-2	FR	Belmont, CA
Addison Lewrence	5-4	SR	Olathe, KS
Rayna Light	5-4	JR	Brandon, FL
Lauren Macpherson	5-1	GR	Gilbert, AZ
Lisa Szeibert	5-1	SO	Wyoming, MI
Kaia Tanskanen	5-2	SO	Howell, MI
Maiya Terry	5-6	FR	Coeur D'Alene, ID
Elise Tisler	5-6	SR	Fairfax Station, VA
Sara Wabi	5-2	GR	Chicago, IL
Hayli Westerlind	5-4	FR	Riverton, UT
Amy Wier	5-1	SR	St. Louis, MO

== Coaching staff ==
- Head coach: Shannon Welker
- Associate head coach: Whitney Snowden
- Assistant coach: Lacey Rubin
- Assistant coach: Jackie Terpak
- Director of Operations: Mady Clark
