= 2025 Big Ten Women's Gymnastics Championship =

Gymnastics competition in Michigan, US

The 2025 Big Ten Women's Gymnastics Championship was held March 21–22, 2025 at the University of Michigan's Crisler Center in Ann Arbor, Michigan.

UCLA wins its first ever Big Ten Women's Gymnastics Championship with a score of 198.450. UCLA also won the regular season title with a 9–0 conference record. UCLA previously competed in the Pac-12 Conference, where it had won 22 conference championships.

== Team results ==
The meet will be conducted in three sessions, with four schools competing in the evening session on March 21, four schools competing in the afternoon session on March 22 and four schools competing in the evening session on March 22. Team seeding is determined by the final Big Ten regular season standings. All three sessions were televised on the Big Ten Network.

Session 1 (March 21, 6PM ET)
| Rank | Team | Vault | Uneven bars | Balance beam | Floor | Total |
|---|---|---|---|---|---|---|
| 9 | Nebraska | 48.725 | 49.275 | 49.450 | 49.150 | 196.175 |
| 10 | Rutgers | 48.775 | 49.275 | 49.075 | 49.100 | 196.225 |
| 11 | Ohio State | 48.950 | 48.875 | 49.175 | 49.250 | 196.250 |
| 12 | Washington | 48.875 | 49.100 | 49.125 | 49.025 | 196.125 |

Session II (March 22, 12PM ET)
| Rank | Team | Vault | Uneven bars | Balance beam | Floor | Total |
|---|---|---|---|---|---|---|
| 5 | Iowa | 49.025 | 49.275 | 49.225 | 49.250 | 196.775 |
| 6 | Maryland | 48.845 | 49.225 | 48.475 | 49.175 | 195.700 |
| 7 | Penn State | 48.850 | 49.150 | 49.075 | 48.975 | 196.050 |
| 8 | Illinois | 48.925 | 49.150 | 49.325 | 49.100 | 196.500 |

Session III (March 22, 6PM ET
| Rank | Team | Vault | Uneven bars | Balance beam | Floor | Total |
|---|---|---|---|---|---|---|
| 1 | UCLA | 49.350 | 49.550 | 49.750 | 49.800 | 198.450 |
| 2 | Minnesota | 49.150 | 49.325 | 49.525 | 49.425 | 197.425 |
| 3 | Michigan State | 49.575 | 49.475 | 49.500 | 49.600 | 198.150 |
| 4 | Michigan | 49.125 | 49.325 | 49.525 | 49.550 | 197.325 |

=== Final results ===
| Rank | Team | Vault | Uneven bars | Balance beam | Floor | Totals |
|---|---|---|---|---|---|---|
| 1st place, gold medalist(s) | UCLA | 49.350 | 49.550 | 49.750 | 49.800 | 198.450 |
| 2nd place, silver medalist(s) | Michigan State | 49.575 | 49.475 | 49.500 | 49.600 | 198.150 |
| 3rd place, bronze medalist(s) | Minnesota | 49.150 | 49.325 | 49.525 | 49.425 | 197.425 |
| 4 | Michigan | 49.125 | 49.325 | 49.525 | 49.550 | 197.325 |
| 5 | Iowa | 49.025 | 49.275 | 49.225 | 49.250 | 196.775 |
| 6 | Illinois | 48.925 | 49.150 | 49.325 | 49.100 | 196.500 |
| 7 | Ohio State | 48.950 | 48.875 | 49.175 | 49.250 | 196.250 |
| 8 | Rutgers | 48.775 | 49.275 | 49.075 | 49.100 | 196.225 |
| 9 | Nebraska | 48.725 | 49.275 | 49.450 | 49.150 | 196.175 |
| 10 | Washington | 48.875 | 49.100 | 49.125 | 49.025 | 196.125 |
| 11 | Penn State | 48.850 | 49.150 | 49.075 | 48.975 | 196.050 |
| 12 | Maryland | 48.845 | 49.225 | 48.475 | 49.175 | 195.700 |

== Individual results ==
=== Medalists ===
| Event | Gold | Silver | Bronze |
|---|---|---|---|
| Individual all-around | Chae Campbell (UCLA) | Gabrielle Stephen (Michigan State) | Jordan Chiles (UCLA) |
| Vault | Olivia Zsarmani (Michigan State) | Sage Kellerman (Michigan State) | Mika Webster-Longin (UCLA) Chae Campbell (UCLA) |
| Uneven bars | Emma Spence (Nebraska) | Frida Esparza (UCLA) Sage Kellerman (Michigan State) Jordyn Lyden (Minnesota) Aurélie Tran (Iowa) | N/A |
| Balance beam | Ciena Alipio (UCLA) Gabrielle Stephen (Michigan State) | N/A | Chae Campbell (UCLA) Emma Malabuyo (UCLA) Sophia McClelland (Nebraska) |
| Floor | Brooklyn Moors(UCLA) Jordan Chiles (UCLA) | N/A | Skyla Schulte (Michigan State) |

=== All-around ===
| Rank | Gymnast | Team | Vault (gymnastics) | Uneven bars | Balance beam | Floor (gymnastics) | Total |
|---|---|---|---|---|---|---|---|
| 1st place, gold medalist(s) | Chae Campbell | UCLA | 9.925 | 9.900 | 9.950 | 9.950 | 39.725 |
| 2nd place, silver medalist(s) | Gabrielle Stephen | Michigan State | 9.850 | 9.900 | 10.000 | 9.925 | 39.675 |
| 3rd place, bronze medalist(s) | Jordan Chiles | UCLA | 9.825 | 9.900 | 9.925 | 10.000 | 39.650 |
| 4 | Emma Spence | Nebraska | 9.825 | 9,975 | 9.900 | 9.875 | 39.575 |
| 5 | Nikki Smith | Michigan State | 9.900 | 9.900 | 9.825 | 9.925 | 39.550 |
| 6 | Aurélie Tran | Iowa | 9.800 | 9.950 | 9.900 | 9.875 | 39.525 |
| 7 | Chloe Cho | Illinois | 9.850 | 9.850 | 9.900 | 9.875 | 39.475 |
| 8 | Tory Vetter | Ohio State | 9.725 | 9.900 | 9.825 | 9.900 | 39.350 |
| 9 | Mary McDonough | Washington | 9.775 | 9.900 | 9.825 | 9.825 | 39.325 |
| 10 | Delaney Adrian | Rutgers | 9.700 | 9.875 | 9.875 | 9.825 | 39.275 |
| 11 | Elizabeth Leary | Penn State | 9.800 | 9.800 | 9.800 | 9.825 | 39.225 |
| 12 | Sophia McClelland | Nebraska | 9.725 | 9.525 | 9.950 | 9.900 | 39.100 |
| 13 | Whitney Jencks | Nebraska | 9.525 | 9.725 | 9.850 | 9.800 | 38.975 |
| 13 | Kristin Lin | Washington | 9.675 | 9.525 | 9.750 | 9.775 | 38.975 |
| 15 | Karina Muñoz | Iowa | 9.850 | 9.675 | 9.775 | 9.025 | 38.525 |

=== 2025 Big Ten Women's Gymnastics All-Championships Team ===
A total of 21 gymnasts earned a place on the Big Ten All-Championships Team by virtue of their performances at the two-day meet.

- Aurélie Tran, Iowa
- Haley Tyson, Iowa
- Natalie Martin, Maryland
- Sage Kellerman, Michigan State
- Skyla Schulte, Michigan State
- Gabrielle Stephen, Michigan State
- Olivia Zsarmani, Michigan State
- Jordyn Lyden, Minnesota
- Sophia McClelland, Nebraska
- Emma Spence, Nebraska
- Rylee Guevara, Ohio State
- Tory Vetter, Ohio State
- Alyssa Kramer, Penn State
- Ciena Alipio, UCLA
- Chae Campbell, UCLA
- Jordan Chiles, UCLA
- Frida Esparza, UCLA
- Emma Malabuyo, UCLA
- Brooklyn Moors, UCLA
- Mika Webster-Longin, UCLA
- Emily Innes, Washington
