= Ava Stewart =

Canadian artistic gymnast

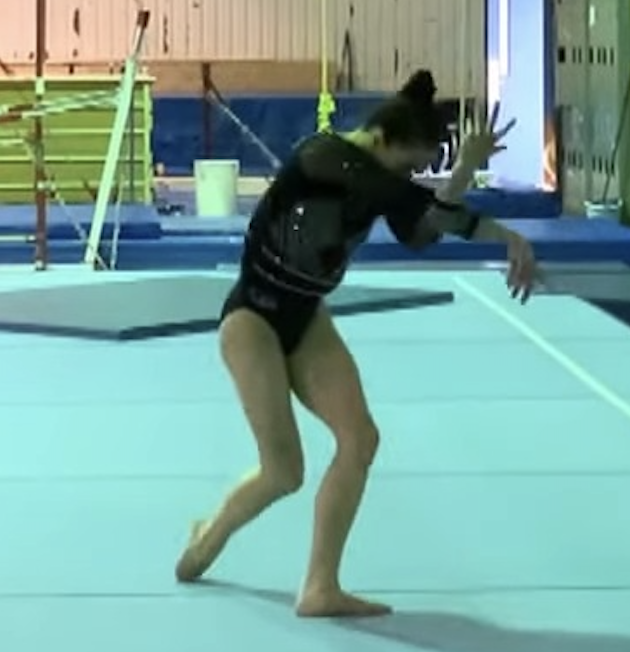
- Stewart in 2021

Personal information
- Full name: Ava Elizabeth Stewart
- Born: September 30, 2005 (age 21) Lebanon, Tennessee

Gymnastics career
- Discipline: Women's artistic gymnastics
- Country represented: Canada; (2020–present)
- College team: Minnesota Golden Gophers (2025–28)
- Club: Gemini Gymnastics
- Head coach: Elena Davydova
- Assistant coach: Valery Yahchybekov
Medal record
Representing Canada
Pan American Games
Bronze medal – third place	2023 Santiago	Team
Bronze medal – third place	2023 Santiago	Balance beam
Pan American Championships
Bronze medal – third place	2022 Rio de Janeiro	Team

Ava Elizabeth Stewart (born September 30, 2005) is a Canadian artistic gymnast. She represented Canada at the 2020 and 2024 Olympic Games. Additionally she was a member of the bronze medal winning teams at the 2022 Pan American Championships and 2023 Pan American Games.

== Early life ==
Stewart was born in Lebanon, Tennessee in 2005 to an American mother and a Canadian father. Her family moved to Bowmanville, Ontario in 2010. She began gymnastics when she was eighteen months old.

== Gymnastics career ==
=== 2020 ===
Stewart made her elite debut at Elite Canada where she finished third in the junior all-around behind Maya Zonneveld and Cassie Lee. As a result, she was selected to make her international debut at 2020 L'International Gymnix. While there, she was part of the Canadian team that finished fourth. Individually, she finished seventh in the all-around and won the bronze medal on the balance beam behind Americans Konnor McClain and Skye Blakely.

=== 2021 ===
Stewart became age-eligible for senior competition in 2021 and made her senior debut at Elite Canada, which was held virtually due to the COVID-19 pandemic in Canada. She finished second in the all-around and on balance beam behind Ellie Black, first on floor exercise, and third on uneven bars behind Rose-Kaying Woo and Black. Stewart was scheduled to compete at the Doha World Cup in March; however, the event was postponed due to the COVID-19 pandemic in Qatar. Stewart next competed at two Technical Trials where she finished second in the all-around behind Black at both. Stewart competed at the Canadian Championships where she once again finished second in the all-around behind Black. Additionally she finished first on uneven bars, second on balance beam behind Black, and fourth on floor exercise behind Brooklyn Moors, Black, and Lillian Bate.

On June 17, Stewart was officially named to Canada's 2020 Olympic team alongside Black, Moors, and Shallon Olsen. Had the Olympic Games not been postponed, Stewart would not have been age-eligible for the competition due to her 2005 birth year. Stewart made her senior international debut at the Olympic Games. The Canadian team finished tenth in the qualification round and did not advance to the finals.

=== 2022 ===
Stewart competed at the 2022 City of Jesolo Trophy where she helped Canada finish third in the team competition. Individually she qualified to and finished fifth in the uneven bars event final. In July Stewart competed at the Pan American Championships where she helped Canada finish third as a team.

=== 2023 ===
Stewart announced her verbal commit to the Minnesota Golden Gophers, starting in the 2024–25 season.

In early October Stewart competed at the 2023 World Championships where she helped the Canadian team finish twelfth in qualifications. Later that month she competed at the Pan American Games. On the first day of competition Stewart helped Canada win bronze behind the United States and Brazil. Individually she qualified to the all-around, uneven bars, and balance beam finals. During the all-around final she finished fifth. During event finals she placed sixth on uneven bars and won bronze on balance beam behind Brazilians Rebeca Andrade and Flávia Saraiva.

=== 2024 ===
In late June Stewart was named to the team to represent Canada at the 2024 Summer Olympics alongside Ellie Black, Cassie Lee, Shallon Olsen, and Aurélie Tran.

At the 2024 Olympic Games Stewart helped Canada qualify to the team final, where they ultimately finished fifth. Individually she qualified to the all-around final and finished nineteenth.

== Eponymous skill ==
Stewart has an uneven bars dismount named after her in the Code of Points.

Apparatus	Name	Description	Difficulty (Note: Valid for the 2025–2028 Code of Points)	Added to Code of Points
Uneven bars	Stewart	Swing backward to double salto forward piked	E (0.5)	2022 Pan American Championships

== Competitive history ==
Competitive history of Ava Stewart at the senior level
Year	Event	Team	AA	VT	UB	BB	FX
2020	Elite Canada (junior)		3rd place, bronze medalist(s)				
2020	L'International Gymnix	4	7			3rd place, bronze medalist(s)	
2021	Elite Canada		2nd place, silver medalist(s)		3rd place, bronze medalist(s)	2nd place, silver medalist(s)	1st place, gold medalist(s)
2021	Technical Trial #1		2nd place, silver medalist(s)				
2021	Technical Trial #2		2nd place, silver medalist(s)				
2021	Canadian Championships		2nd place, silver medalist(s)		1st place, gold medalist(s)	2nd place, silver medalist(s)	4
2021	Olympic Games	10					
2022	City of Jesolo Trophy	3rd place, bronze medalist(s)			5		
2022	Pan American Championships	3rd place, bronze medalist(s)					
2023	Elite Canada				2nd place, silver medalist(s)		
2023	Cairo World Cup				5		
2023	World Championships	12					
2023	Pan American Games	3rd place, bronze medalist(s)	5		6	3rd place, bronze medalist(s)	
2024	DTB Pokal Team Challenge	4				5	
2024	City of Jesolo Trophy	4	19				
2024	Canadian Championships		3rd place, bronze medalist(s)		3rd place, bronze medalist(s)	1st place, gold medalist(s)	8
2024	Olympic Games	5	19				
2025	Canadian Championships		4	4	5	5	
2026	Canadian Championships					4	

Competitive history of Ava Stewart at the NCAA level
Year	Event	Team	AA	VT	UB	BB	FX
2026	Big Ten Championship	3rd place, bronze medalist(s)				3rd place, bronze medalist(s)	
2026	NCAA Championship	4		31		47	
