= California Golden Bears women's gymnastics =

Women's gymnastics team at the University of California

California Golden Bears
- Founded: 1974
- University: University of California, Berkeley
- Head coach: Geralen Stack-Eaton
- Conference: ACC
- Location: Berkeley, California
- Home arena: Haas Pavilion (Capacity: 11,877)
- Nickname: Golden Bears
- Colors: Blue and gold

Four on the Floor appearances
- 2024

NCAA Tournament appearances
- 1983, 1984, 1986, 1987, 1988, 1989, 1991, 1992, 1994, 1995, 1996, 1997, 1998, 2001, 2003, 2004, 2007, 2013, 2014, 2015, 2016, 2017, 2018, 2019, 2021, 2022, 2023, 2024, 2025, 2026

Conference championships
- Pac-12 Regular Season: 2022, 2023, 2024; ACC Regular Season: 2025

The California Golden Bears women's gymnastics team represents the University of California, Berkeley and competes at the Division I level of the National Collegiate Athletic Association (NCAA) as members of the Atlantic Coast Conference.

Home meets are held in Haas Pavilion in Berkeley, California.

== History ==
The Golden Bears women's gymnastics program first competed in 1976 in the AIAW under head coach Sue Williamson. Since women's gymnastics began as an NCAA sponsored sport in 1982, they have appeared in the NCAA tournament 29 times.

In 2021, Maya Bordas won Cal's first individual title on the uneven bars.

In 2022, Cal won a share of the regular season Pac-12 championship. They repeated the feat again in 2023. In 2024, Cal's last year in the Pac-12, they won the regular season Pac-12 championship outright.

The Golden Bears made it to the Four on the Floor for the first time in 2024, finishing second to LSU.

In 2025, Cal joined the Atlantic Coast Conference. In their first season, they won the regular season conference title outright. Cal also posted the highest score in ACC history with a 197.775 against Pitt.

== Current roster ==
2026–2027 Roster
Name	Height	Year	Hometown
Ava Banks		SO	
Lucy Eanes		FR	Indian Land, SC
Jade Gola		FR	
Denisa Golgotă		FR	Alimpești, Romania
Maddison Hajjar	5-4	SO	Montreal, QC
Adilenne Holt		FR	
CJ Keuneke	5-2	JR	Denver, CO
Brandi Kikuno	5-3	SR	San Diego, CA
Sarah Lee	5-2	SO	Arcadia, CA
Kyen Mayhew	5-2	SR	Mesa, AZ
Sage Melkonian	5-2	JR	Mission Viejo, CA
Annalise Newman-Achee	5-7	SR	Brooklyn, NY
Aberdeen O'Driscoll		JR	Léglise, Belgium
Tonya Paulsson	5-4	SO	Malmö, Sweden
Ella Rausa		FR	
Lucia Scott	5-4	SO	Victoria, BC
Jillian Silvers		R-SO	Culver City, CA
Lisa Szeibert		JR	
Brianna Taurek	5-5	JR	Santa Ana, CA
Nia Thomas		FR	

== Coaching staff ==
- Head Coach: Geralen Stack-Eaton
- Associate Head Coach: Rich Stenger
- Assistant Coach: Brittany McClure
- Assistant Coach: Mya Lauzon

== Head coaches ==
Name	Years	Record	Win %
Sue Williamson	1974	4-3	.571
Debbie Bailey	1975-1976	1-3	.250
Molly Rackham	1977	5-4	.556
Dan Millman	1978-1979	8-22	.267
Dale Flansaas	1980-1981	12-26	.316
Diane Dunbar	1982-1985	42-45	.483
Pam Burgess	1986-1993	79-101	.439
Alfie Mitchell	1994-1997	46-55	.455
Trina Tinti	1998-2002	45-78	.366
Cari DuBois	2003-2011	58-150	.279
Danna Durante	2012	4-18	.182
Justin Howell	2013-2025		
Elisabeth Crandall-Howell	2018-2025		
Geralen Stack-Eaton	2026-present		

== NCAA Champions ==
As of the end of the 2025 season, 1 Cal gymnast has won an individual event championship.

Name	Event	Year
Maya Bordas	Uneven Bars	2021

== Past Olympians ==
- Karen Kelsall (Canada) (1976)
- Toni-Ann Williams (Jamaica) (2016)
