= Aurélie Tran =

Canadian artistic gymnast

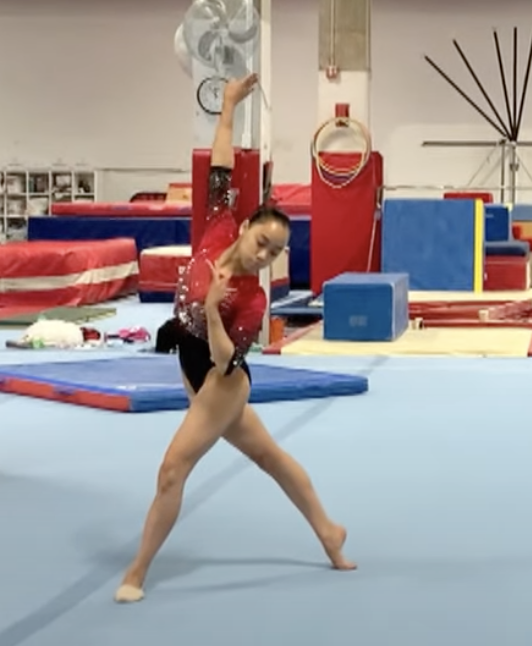
- Tran at the 2021 Canadian Championships

Personal information
- Full name: Aurélie Tran
- Born: May 25, 2006 (age 20) Quebec City, Quebec, Canada

Gymnastics career
- Discipline: Women's artistic gymnastics
- Country represented: Canada; (2021–present)
- College team: Iowa Hawkeyes (2025–28)
- Club: Gymnix
- Head coach: Katerine Dussault
- Assistant coaches: Pierre Privé; Francine Bouffard
Medal record
Representing Canada
Pan American Games
Bronze medal – third place	2023 Santiago	Team
Pan American Championships
Gold medal – first place	2026 Rio de Janeiro	Uneven bars
Bronze medal – third place	2023 Medellín	Team
Bronze medal – third place	2023 Medellín	All-around
Bronze medal – third place	2023 Medellín	Balance beam
Bronze medal – third place	2026 Rio de Janeiro	Team
Representing Iowa Hawkeyes
NCAA Championships
Silver medal – second place	2026 Fort Worth	Uneven Bars

Aurélie Tran (born May 25, 2006) is a Canadian artistic gymnast. She represented Canada at the 2024 Summer Olympics. Additionally she was a member of the bronze medal-winning teams at the 2023 and 2026 Pan American Championships and the 2023 Pan American Games. Individually she is the 2026 Pan American champion on the uneven bars.

== Early life and education ==
Tran was born in Quebec City on May 25, 2006. She is of Vietnamese ancestry. She started gymnastics at age five and began competing two year later.

Tran is currently attending the University of Iowa, competing for their NCAA gymnastics team.

== Junior gymnastics career ==
Tran competed at various Elite Canada and Canadian National Championships from 2018 to 2020. She made her international debut at International Gymnix in 2020 where she competed in the Challenge Division, winning two bronze medals.

In 2021, Tran was the Elite Canada junior champion as well as the junior Canadian national champion. Toward the end of the year, she was selected to represent Canada at the 2021 Junior Pan American Games; she won bronze in the all-around behind Americans Katelyn Jong and Kailin Chio, as well as silver on the uneven bars. She was Canada's flag bearer for the opening ceremony of the event.

== Senior gymnastics career ==
=== 2022–2024 ===
Tran turned senior in 2022, though she didn't compete for much of the season due to an injury to her achilles tendon.

Tran competed at the 2023 Elite Canada competition where she placed first in the all-around. She competed at the 2023 DTB Pokal Team Challenge where she helped Canada finish sixth as a team. Individually she won bronze on floor exercise.

Tran was named to the team to compete at the 2023 Pan American Championships alongside Jenna Lalonde, Cassie Lee, Frédérique Sgarbossa, Sydney Turner, and Evandra Zlobec. On the first day of competition Tran won bronze in the all-around behind American Tiana Sumanasekera and Natalia Escalera of Mexico. Additionally she won bronze on balance beam. During the team final Tran helped Canada win the bronze medal behind the United States and Mexico.

Tran was named to the 2023 World Artistic Gymnastics Championships team for Canada along with Ellie Black, Ava Stewart, Cassie Lee, and Rose-Kaying Woo. During qualifications, Tran contributed scores of 13.233 on vault, 13.133 on uneven bars, 11.933 on balance beam, and 12.600 on floor exercise. The Canadian team came in 12th.

Tran was named to the 2023 Pan American Games team for Canada, along with Ava Stewart, Sydney Turner, Cassie Lee and Frederique Sgarbossa. While at the Games, she helped Canada win a bronze medal in the team event, contributing scores on all four apparatuses, with 13.200 on vault, 13.400 on uneven bars, 12.866 on balance beam, and 12.666 on floor. She qualified to the all-around, uneven bars, balance beam, and floor exercise finals. In the all-around final, she placed 7th with a score of 50.465. In the uneven bars final, she came in fifth with a score of 13.100; on balance beam her score of 12.133 ended up 8th; and in the floor exercise final she also came in fifth with a score of 13.166.

In late June 2024, Tran was named to the team to represent Canada at the 2024 Summer Olympics alongside Ellie Black, Cassie Lee, Shallon Olsen, and Ava Stewart.

At the 2024 Olympic Games Tran helped Canada qualify to the team final, where they ultimately finished fifth.

=== 2025–present ===
Tran competed at the 2026 Pan American Championships where he helped Canada win bronze as a team. Individually she won gold on the uneven bars, becoming the third Canadian to achieve the feat.

== Collegiate career ==
=== 2025–26 season ===
In April 2026, Tran earned a perfect 10 on uneven bars at the Corvallis regional of the NCAA championship. This marked the first perfect score on uneven bars in program history. This score earned her an individual spot on uneven bars at the National Championships in Fort Worth, Texas.

At the National Championship, Tran scored a 9.9750 on uneven bars, the second-highest score of the semifinal round. She, alongside Skye Blakely of Florida, took runner-up placement on the event behind Riley McCusker of Florida.

=== Regular season ranking ===
Season	All-around	Vault	Uneven bars	Balance beam	Floor exercise
2026	13th	64th	15th	91st	140th

== Competitive history ==
Competitive history of Aurélie Tran at the junior level
Year	Event	Team	AA	VT	UB	BB	FX
2018	Elite Canada		24				
2019	Elite Canada		15				
2019	Canadian Championships		17				
2020	Elite Canada		9				
2020	International Gymnix (Challenge)		8		8	3rd place, bronze medalist(s)	3rd place, bronze medalist(s)
2021	Elite Canada		1st place, gold medalist(s)				
2021	Canadian Championships		1st place, gold medalist(s)				
2021	Junior Pan American Games		3rd place, bronze medalist(s)	7	2nd place, silver medalist(s)		

Competitive history of Aurélie Tran at the senior level
Year	Event	Team	AA	VT	UB	BB	FX
2022	Gymnova Cup				2nd place, silver medalist(s)		
2023	Elite Canada		1st place, gold medalist(s)				
2023	DTB Pokal Team Challenge	6					3rd place, bronze medalist(s)
2023	Canadian Championships		1st place, gold medalist(s)				
2023	Pan American Championships	3rd place, bronze medalist(s)	3rd place, bronze medalist(s)		4	3rd place, bronze medalist(s)	4
2023	World Championships	12					
2023	Pan American Games	3rd place, bronze medalist(s)	7		5	8	5
2024	City of Jesolo Trophy	4	10			6	5
2024	Canadian Championships		2nd place, silver medalist(s)		2nd place, silver medalist(s)	2nd place, silver medalist(s)	2nd place, silver medalist(s)
2024	Olympic Games	5					
2026	Canadian Championships		14		2nd place, silver medalist(s)	5	
2026	Pan American Championships	3rd place, bronze medalist(s)			1st place, gold medalist(s)		

Competitive history of Aurélie Tran at the NCAA level
Year	Event	Team	AA	VT	UB	BB	FX
2025	Big Ten Championship	5	6		2nd place, silver medalist(s)		
2025	NCAA Championship	26					
2026	Big Ten Championship	5	6		1st place, gold medalist(s)	3rd place, bronze medalist(s)	
2026	NCAA Championship	17			2nd place, silver medalist(s)		
