= Cassie Lee (gymnast) =

Canadian artistic gymnast

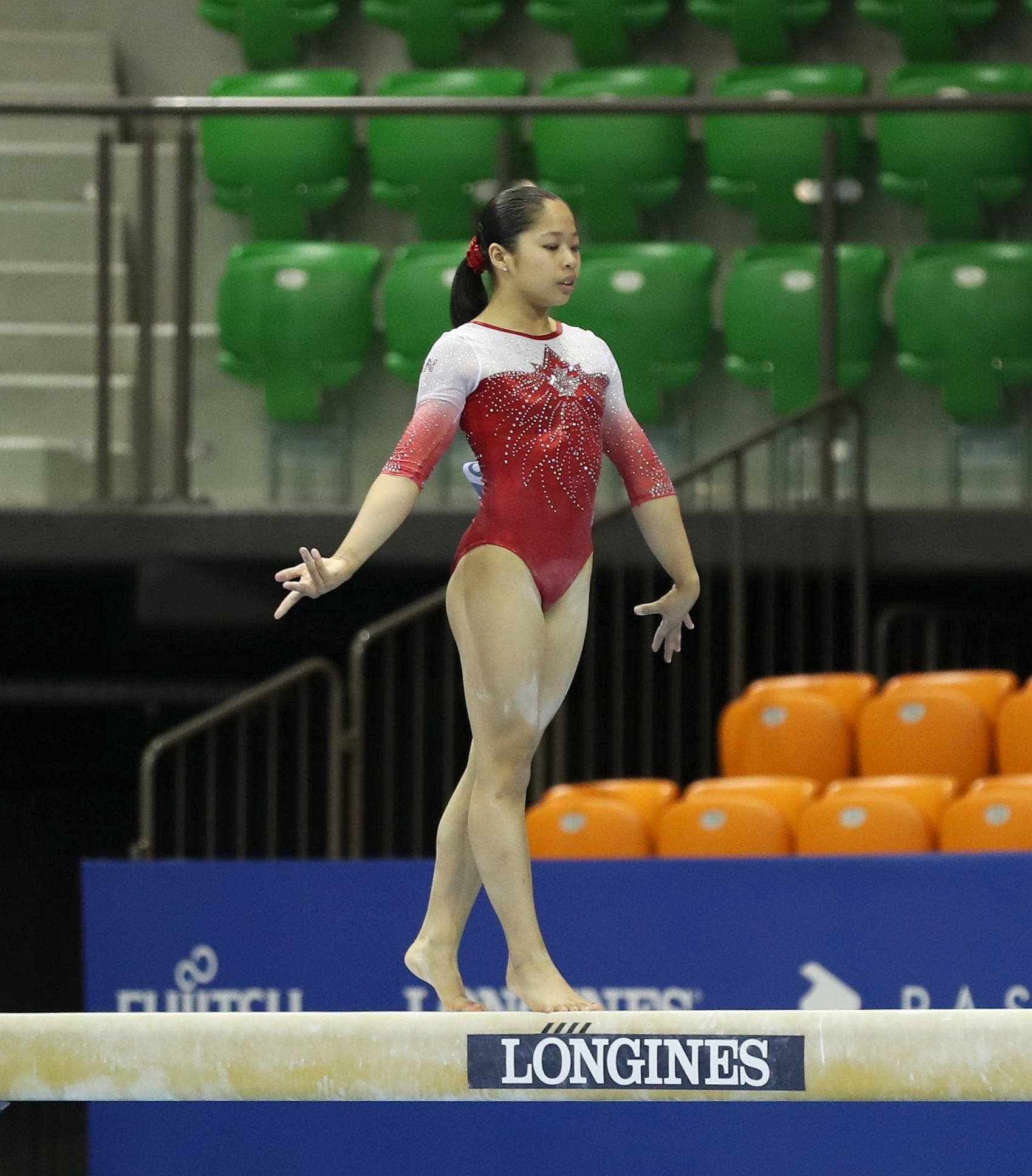
- Lee at the 2019 Junior World Championships

Personal information
- Full name: Cassandra Paige Lee
- Born: October 15, 2005 (age 21) Toronto, Ontario
- Height: 152 cm (5 ft 0 in)

Gymnastics career
- Discipline: Women's artistic gymnastics
- Country represented: Canada; (2019–present)
- College team: Iowa Hawkeyes (2025–28)
- Club: East York / Manjak's Gymnastics
- Head coach: Lisa Cowan
- Assistant coach: Cody Casey
Medal record
Representing Canada
Pan American Games
Bronze medal – third place	2023 Santiago	Team
Pan American Championships
Bronze medal – third place	2023 Medellín	Team
Commonwealth Games
Bronze medal – third place	2022 Birmingham	Team
FIG World Cup
Event	1st	2nd	3rd
World Challenge Cup	1	0	0
Total	1	0	0

Cassandra Paige Lee (born October 15, 2005) is a Canadian artistic gymnast. She represented Canada at the 2024 Summer Olympics. She was part of the bronze medal-winning team at the 2023 Pan American Games. She is currently a member of the Iowa Hawkeyes Gymnastics team.

== Early life ==
Lee was born in Toronto in 2005.

== Junior gymnastics career ==
Lee competed at Elite Canada in the novice division in 2018; she finished 25th. She next competed at the 2018 Canadian Championships where she finished 16th.

Lee made her international debut at the 2019 International Gymnix challenge cup. She finished 11th in the all-around. At the Canadian Championships Lee finished fourth in the all-around but third on uneven bars and floor exercise. Lee was selected to represent Canada at the inaugural junior World Championships alongside Clara Raposo and Okeri Katjivari. As a team they finished 12th and individually Lee finished 22nd in the all-around.

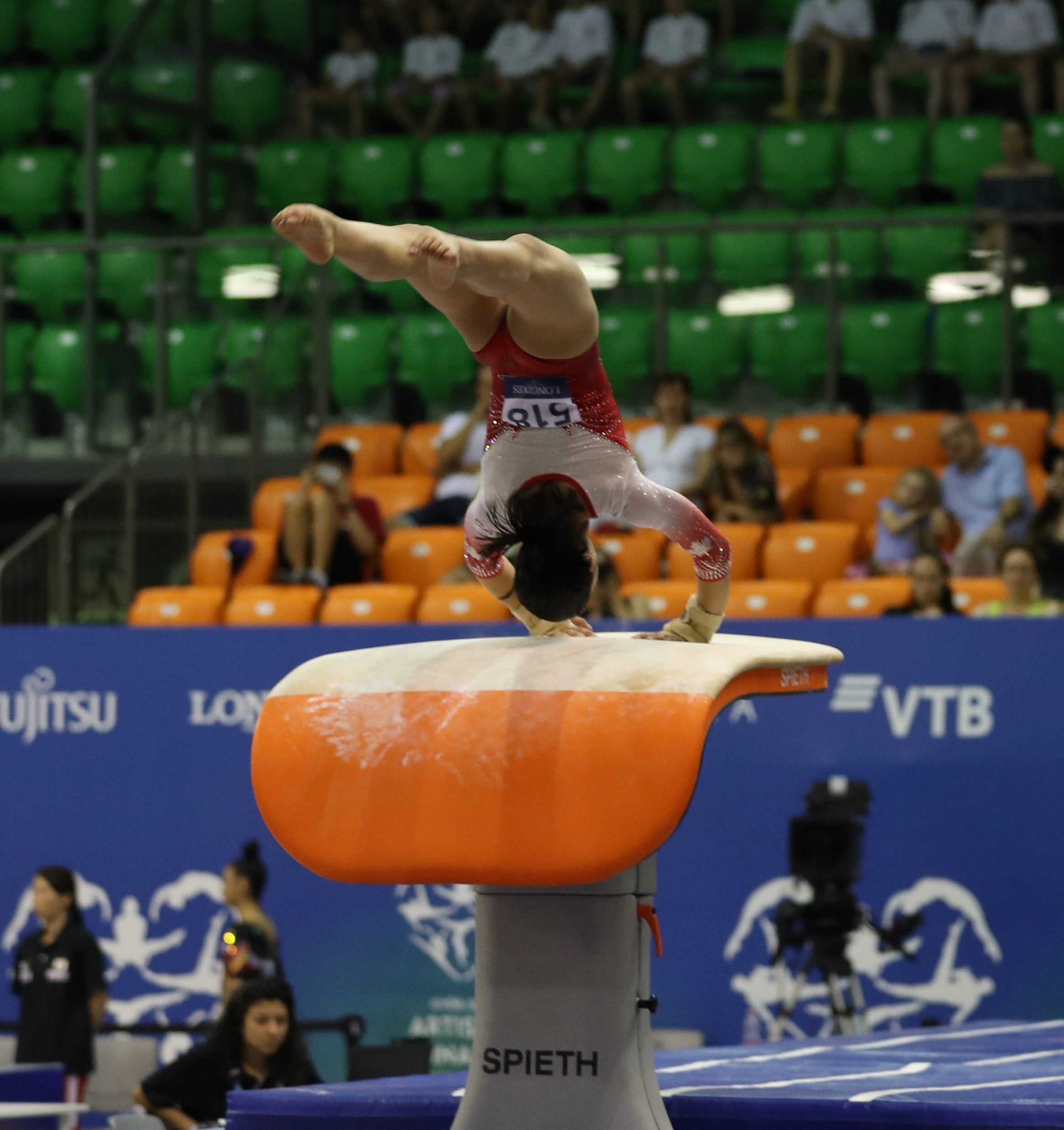
Vault

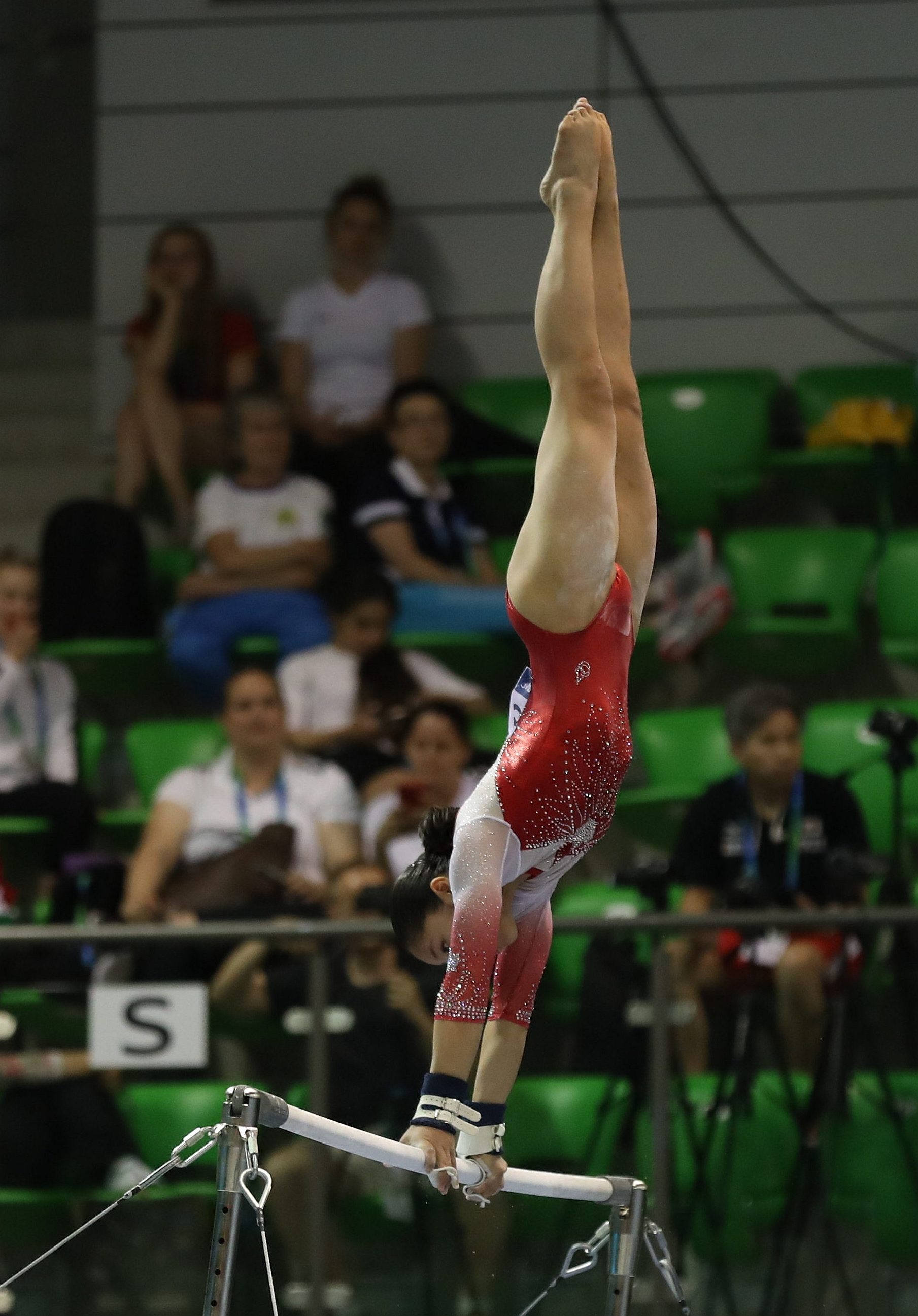
Uneven Bars

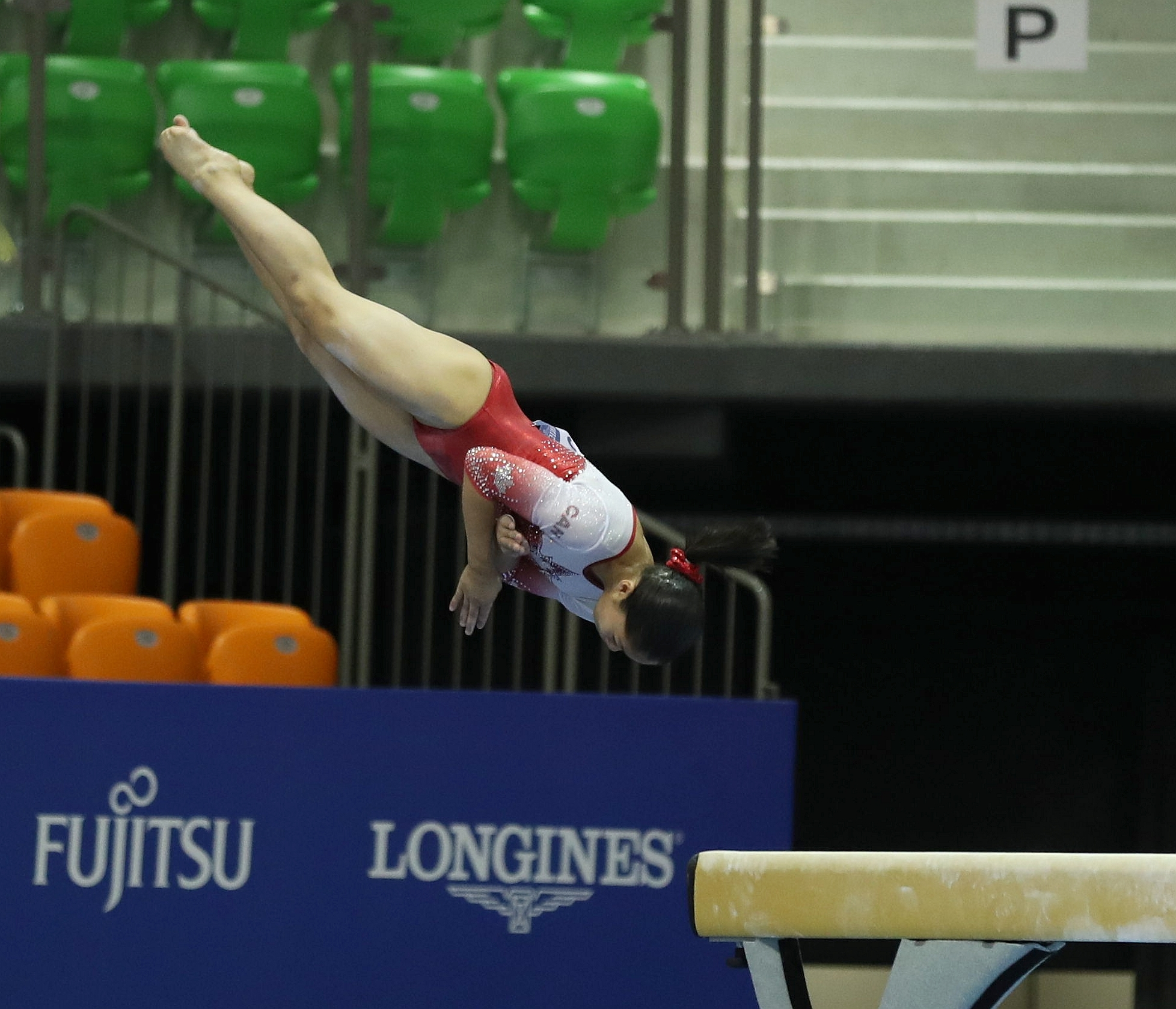
Balance Beam

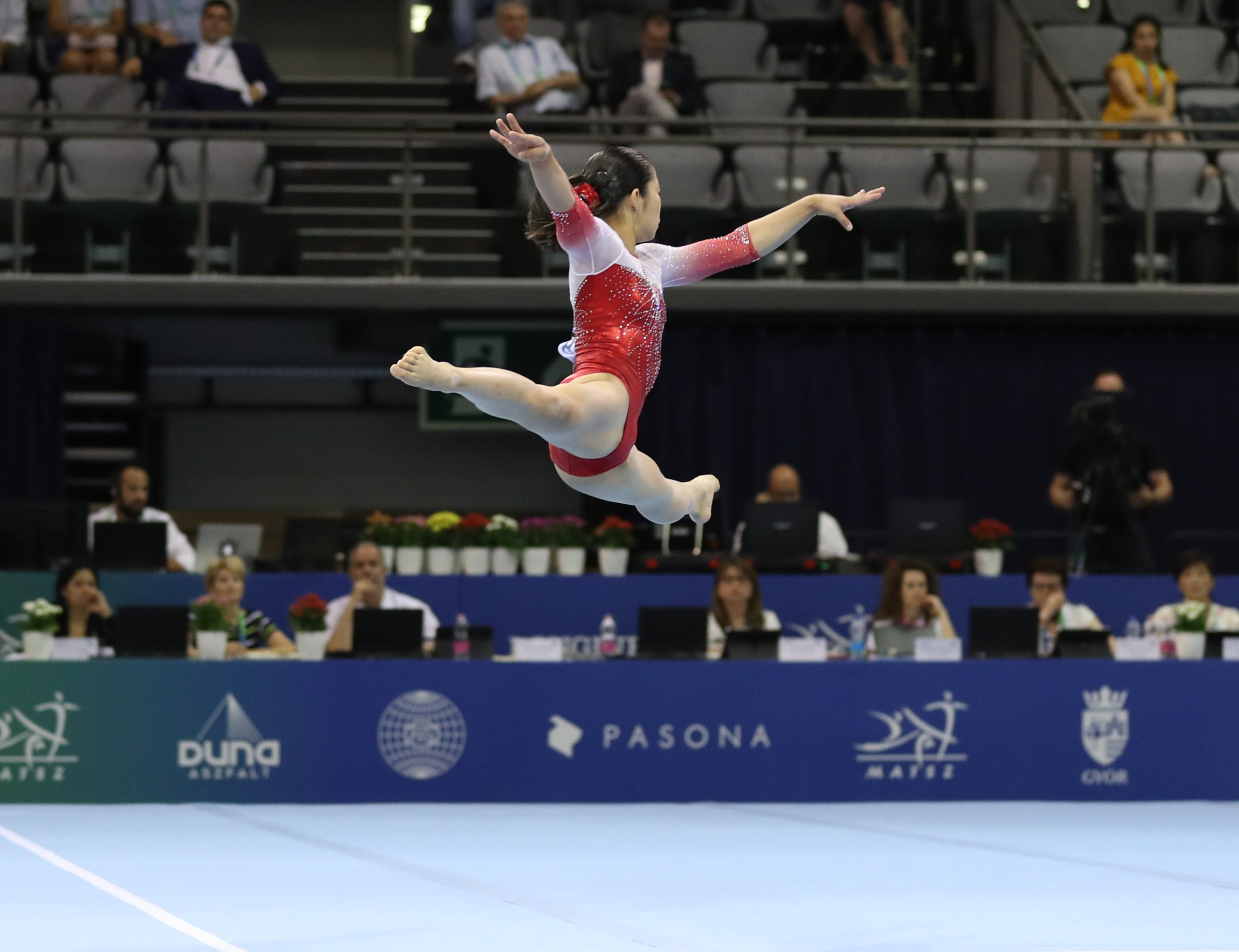
Floor Exercise

Lee at the 2019 Junior World Championships

In 2020 Lee competed at Elite Canada where she finished second in the junior all-around behind Maya Zonneveld. As a result, she was selected to compete at International Gymnix. While there, she was part of the Canadian team that finished fourth. Individually, she finished fourteenth in the all-around.

== Senior gymnastics career ==
=== 2021 ===
Lee became age-eligible for senior competition in 2021 and made her senior debut at Elite Canada, which was held virtually due to the COVID-19 pandemic in Canada. She finished seventh in the all-around and third on floor exercise. Lee next competed at two Technical Trials. She next competed at the Canadian Championships where she finished 12th.

Lee competed at the Koper Challenge Cup in September. She won gold on balance beam and placed fourth on floor exercise. In October she competed at the World Championships. She only competed on the balance beam and finished 21st during qualifications; she did not advance to the event final.

=== 2022 ===
Lee competed at Elite Canada where she finished second in the all-around behind Ellie Black. Additionally she placed first on balance beam and floor exercise. She next competed at the 2022 City of Jesolo Trophy where she helped Canada finish third in the team competition. Individually she qualified to and finished seventh in the floor exercise final. In July Lee was selected to compete at the Commonwealth Games alongside Laurie Denommée, Jenna Lalonde, Emma Spence, and Maya Zonneveld. During the team final Lee helped Canada finish third behind England and Australia. She qualified to the floor exercise final where she finished fifth.

=== 2023–2024 ===
Lee competed at the 2023 Pan American Championships where she helped Canada finish third as a team. In July she announced her verbal commit to compete for the Iowa Hawkeyes starting in the 2024–25 season.

In late June of 2024 Lee was named to the team to represent Canada at the 2024 Summer Olympics alongside Ellie Black, Ava Stewart, Shallon Olsen, and Aurélie Tran.

At the 2024 Olympic Games Lee helped Canada qualify to the team final, where they ultimately finished fifth.

== Competitive history ==
Competitive history of Cassie Lee at the junior level
Year	Event	Team	AA	VT	UB	BB	FX
2018	Elite Canada		25				
2018	Canadian Championships		16			2nd place, silver medalist(s)	
2019	Elite Canada		4				
2019	L'International Gymnix		11		5		
2019	Canadian Championships		4				
2019	Junior World Championships	12	22				
2020	Elite Canada		2nd place, silver medalist(s)				
2020	L'International Gymnix	4	14				

Competitive history of Cassie Lee at the senior level
Year	Event	Team	AA	VT	UB	BB	FX
2021	Elite Canada		7		17	7	3rd place, bronze medalist(s)
2021	Technical Trial #2		11				
2021	Canadian Championships		12		17	11	5
2021	Koper Challenge Cup					1st place, gold medalist(s)	4
2021	World Championships					21	
2022	Elite Canada		2nd place, silver medalist(s)			1st place, gold medalist(s)	1st place, gold medalist(s)
2022	City of Jesolo Trophy	3rd place, bronze medalist(s)					7
2022	Commonwealth Games	3rd place, bronze medalist(s)					5
2023	Elite Canada		2nd place, silver medalist(s)				2nd place, silver medalist(s)
2023	City of Jesolo Trophy	4	14			1st place, gold medalist(s)	
2023	Pan American Championships	3rd place, bronze medalist(s)					
2023	World Championships	12					
2023	Pan American Games	3rd place, bronze medalist(s)					
2024	City of Jesolo Trophy	4	20				
2024	Canadian Championships		11		16	5	15
2024	Olympic Games	5					
