= Mexico at the 2024 Summer Olympics =

- IOC code: MEX
- NOC: Mexican Olympic Committee
- Website: soycom.org (in Spanish)

in Paris, France 26 July 2024 – 11 August 2024
- Competitors: 107 (45 men and 62 women) in 24 sports
- Flag bearers (opening): Emiliano Hernández & Alejandra Orozco
- Flag bearers (closing): Marco Verde & Nuria Diosdado
- Medals Ranked 65th: Gold 0 Silver 3 Bronze 2 Total 5

Summer Olympics appearances (overview)
- 1900; 1904–1920; 1924; 1928; 1932; 1936; 1948; 1952; 1956; 1960; 1964; 1968; 1972; 1976; 1980; 1984; 1988; 1992; 1996; 2000; 2004; 2008; 2012; 2016; 2020; 2024; 2028

Mexico competed at the 2024 Summer Olympics in Paris from 26 July to 11 August 2024. It was the nation's twenty-fifth appearance at the Summer Olympics, having debuted in 1900. Mexico won a total of five medals, three being silver and two bronze.

== Medalists ==
Medal	Name	Sport	Event	Date
Silver	Prisca Awiti Alcaraz	Judo	Women's 63 kg	30 July
Silver	Osmar Olvera; Juan Celaya	Diving	Men's synchronized 3 m springboard	2 August
Silver	Marco Verde	Boxing	Men's 71 kg	9 August
Bronze	Ángela Ruiz; Alejandra Valencia; Ana Paula Vázquez	Archery	Women's team	28 July
Bronze	Osmar Olvera	Diving	Men's 3 m springboard	8 August

Medals by sport
Sport	1st place, gold medalist(s)	2nd place, silver medalist(s)	3rd place, bronze medalist(s)	Total
Diving	0	1	1	2
Judo	0	1	0	1
Boxing	0	1	0	1
Archery	0	0	1	1
Total	0	3	2	5

Medals by gender
Gender	1st place, gold medalist(s)	2nd place, silver medalist(s)	3rd place, bronze medalist(s)	Total
Male	0	2	1	3
Female	0	1	1	2
Mixed	0	0	0	0
Total	0	3	2	5

Medals by day
Day	1st place, gold medalist(s)	2nd place, silver medalist(s)	3rd place, bronze medalist(s)	Total
27 July	0	0	0	0
28 July	0	0	1	1
29 July	0	0	0	0
30 July	0	1	0	1
31 July	0	0	0	0
1 August	0	0	0	0
2 August	0	1	0	1
3 August	0	0	0	0
4 August	0	0	0	0
5 August	0	0	0	0
6 August	0	0	0	0
7 August	0	0	0	0
8 August	0	0	1	1
9 August	0	1	0	1
10 August	0	0	0	0
11 August	0	0	0	0
Total	0	3	2	5

Multiple medalists
Name	Sport	1st place, gold medalist(s)	2nd place, silver medalist(s)	3rd place, bronze medalist(s)	Total
Osmar Olvera	Diving	0	1	1	2

== Competitors ==
The following is the list of number of competitors in the Games.

Sport	Men	Women	Total
Archery	3	3	6
Artistic swimming	0	8	8
Athletics	9	9	18
Badminton	1	0	1
Boxing	2	2	4
Canoeing	0	3	3
Cycling	2	6	8
Diving	5	4	9
Equestrian	3	0	3
Fencing	1	0	1
Golf	2	2	4
Gymnastics	0	8	8
Judo	0	2	2
Modern pentathlon	2	2	4
Rowing	2	1	3
Sailing	0	2	2
Shooting	2	3	5
Surfing	1	0	1
Swimming	4	2	6
Table tennis	1	1	2
Taekwondo	1	1	2
Triathlon	2	2	4
Weightlifting	0	1	1
Wrestling	2	0	2
Total	45	62	107

== Archery ==
Mexico entered a full-squad of men's and women's archers. The women's team qualified for the games by virtue of their bronze-medal in the women's recurve team event at the 2023 World Championships in Berlin, Germany. Meanwhile, the men's team recurve archer qualified for the games by virtue of the team result at the 2024 Final Qualification Tournament in Antalya, Turkey.

Men

Athlete	Event	Ranking round		Round of 64	Round of 32	Round of 16	Quarterfinals	Semifinals	Final / BM	
Athlete	Event	Score	Seed	Opposition Score	Opposition Score	Opposition Score	Opposition Score	Opposition Score	Opposition Score	Rank
Matías Grande	Individual	676	11	Baatarkhuyagiin (MGL); W 7–1	Enríquez (COL); W 6–2	Addis (FRA); L 4–6	Did not advance			=9
Bruno Martínez	Individual	653	44	Franco (CUB); L 3–7	Did not advance					=33
Carlos Rojas	Individual	643	55	Tümer (TUR); L 4–6	Did not advance					=33
Matías Grande; Bruno Martínez; Carlos Rojas	Team	1972	9	—N/a		Japan; L 1–5	Did not advance			9

Women

Athlete	Event	Ranking round		Round of 64	Round of 32	Round of 16	Quarterfinals	Semifinals	Final / BM	
Athlete	Event	Score	Seed	Opposition Score	Opposition Score	Opposition Score	Opposition Score	Opposition Score	Opposition Score	Rank
Ángela Ruiz	Individual	658	24	Pitman (GBR); L 2–6	Did not advance					=33
Alejandra Valencia	Individual	669	8	Mucino-Fernandez (USA); W 6–2	Marchenko (UKR); W 6–4	Li (CHN); W 6–5	Lim (KOR); L 4–6	Did not advance		6
Ana Paula Vázquez	Individual	659	20	Schwarz (GER); L 4–6	Did not advance					=33
Ángela Ruiz; Alejandra Valencia; Ana Paula Vázquez	Team	1986	3	—N/a		Bye	Germany; W 5–1	China; L 3–5	Netherlands; W 6–2	3rd place, bronze medalist(s)

Mixed

Athlete	Event	Ranking round		Round of 16	Quarterfinals	Semifinals	Final / BM	
Athlete	Event	Score	Seed	Opposition Score	Opposition Score	Opposition Score	Opposition Score	Rank
Matías Grande; Alejandra Valencia	Team	1345	7 Q	Brazil; W 5–1	Germany; L 1–5	Did not advance		8

== Artistic swimming ==
Mexico fielded a squad of eight artistic swimmers to compete in the women's duet and team events by winning the gold medal at the 2023 Pan American Games in Santiago, Chile.

Athlete	Event	Technical routine		Free routine		Acrobatic routine		Total	
Athlete	Event	Points	Rank	Points	Rank	Points	Rank	Points	Rank
Nuria Diosdado; Joana Jiménez	Duet	238.9383	11	232.6563	12	—N/a		471.5946	12
Regina Alférez; María Arellano; Nuria Diosdado; Itzamary González; Joana Jiménez; Luisa Rodríguez; Jessica Sobrino; Pamela Toscano	Team	242.9491	8	347.3874	3	263.4567	5	853.7932	7

== Athletics ==
Mexican track and field athletes achieved the entry standards for Paris 2024, either by passing the direct qualifying mark (or time for track and road races) or by world ranking, in the following events (a maximum of 3 athletes each):

Key

- Note: Ranks given for track events are within the athlete's heat only
- Q = Qualified for the next round
- q = Qualified for the next round as a fastest loser or, in field events, by position without achieving the qualifying target
- Re= Qualified for the repechage round
- NR = National record
- SB = Season's best
- N/A = Round not applicable for the event
- Bye = Athlete not required to compete in round

Track & road events

Athlete	Event	Heat		Repechage		Semifinal		Final	
Athlete	Event	Result	Rank	Result	Rank	Result	Rank	Result	Rank
Tonatiú López	Men's 800 m	1:45.82	5 Re	1:45.13	1 Q	1:50.38	8	Did not advance	
Noel Chama	Men's 20 km walk	—N/a						1:20:19 NR	13
José Luis Doctor	Men's 20 km walk	—N/a						DSQ	
Ricardo Ortiz	Men's 20 km walk	—N/a						1:20:27	14
Cecilia Tamayo-Garza	Women's 100 m	11.39	5	—N/a		Did not advance			
Cecilia Tamayo-Garza	Women's 200 m	23.65	7 Re	23.49	5	Did not advance			
Paola Morán	Women's 400 m	51.04	3 Q	Bye		50.73	6	Did not advance	
Alma Delia Cortés	Women's 5000 m	15:45.33	18	—N/a		Did not advance			
Laura Galván	Women's 5000 m	15:05.20 SB	11	—N/a		Did not advance			
Citlali Cristian	Women's marathon	—N/a						2:30:03 SB	27
Margarita Hernández	Women's marathon	—N/a						2:37:24 SB	63
Alegna González	Women's 20 km walk	—N/a						1:27:14	5
Ilse Guerrero	Women's 20 km walk	—N/a						1:37:10	39
Alejandra Ortega	Women's 20 km walk	—N/a						1:31:58	24
Alegna González; Ever Palma	Mixed marathon walk relay	—N/a						2:52:38	5

Field events

Athlete	Event	Qualification		Final	
Athlete	Event	Distance	Position	Distance	Position
Uziel Muñoz	Men's shot put	21.22	8 q	20.88	8
Edgar Rivera	Men's high jump	2.20	=15	Did not advance	
Erick Portillo	Men's high jump	2.20	=15	Did not advance	
Diego del Real	Men's hammer throw	72.10	22	Did not advance	

== Badminton ==
Mexico entered one badminton players into the Olympic tournament based on the BWF Race to Paris Rankings.

Athlete	Event	Group stage			Elimination	Quarter-final	Semi-final	Final / BM	
Athlete	Event	Opposition Score	Opposition Score	Rank	Opposition Score	Opposition Score	Opposition Score	Opposition Score	Rank
Luis Ramón Garrido	Men's singles	Chou (TPE); L (17–21, 13–21)	Lee (HKG); L (5–21, 21–15, 17–21)	3	Did not advance				=27

== Boxing ==
Mexico entered four boxers (two men and two women) into the Olympic tournament. Miguel Ángel Martínez and Marco Verde secured one spots in their respective division, by virtue of advancing to the final round of 2023 Pan Am Games in Santiago, Chile. Joining the squad, Fátima Herrera (women's flyweight) and Citlalli Ortiz (women's middleweight) qualified for the games following the triumph of her victory in quota bouts round, at the 2024 World Olympic Qualification Tournament 2 in Bangkok, Thailand.

Athlete	Event	Round of 32	Round of 16	Quarterfinals	Semifinals	Final	
Athlete	Event	Opposition Result	Opposition Result	Opposition Result	Opposition Result	Opposition Result	Rank
Miguel Ángel Martínez	Men's 63.5 kg	Bye	Abdullaev (UZB); L 0–5	Did not advance			=9
Marco Verde	Men's 71 kg	Bye	Muxanga (MOZ); W 3–2	Dev (IND); W 4–1	Richardson (GBR); W 3–2	Muydinkhujaev (UZB); L 0–5	2nd place, silver medalist(s)
Fátima Herrera	Women's 50 kg	Fuertes (ESP); W 3–2	Çakıroğlu (TUR); L 0–5	Did not advance			=9
Citlalli Ortiz	Women's 75 kg	—N/a	Parker (AUS); L 0–5	Did not advance			=9

== Canoeing ==
=== Slalom ===
Mexico entered one boat into Paris 2024, through the 2024 Canoe Slalom Pan American Olympic Qualifiers in Rio de Janeiro, Brazil.

K-1

Athlete	Event	Preliminary						Semifinal		Final	
Athlete	Event	Run 1	Rank	Run 2	Rank	Best	Rank	Time	Rank	Time	Rank
Sofía Reinoso	Women's K-1	122.40	24	120.93	25	120.93	25	Did not advance			

Kayak cross

Athlete	Event	Time Trial		Round 1 Race		Repechage		Heats		Quarterfinal		Semifinal		Final	
Athlete	Event	Time	Rank	Faults	Rank	Faults	Rank	Faults	Rank	Faults	Rank	Faults	Rank	Faults	Rank
Sofía Reinoso	Women's KX-1	82.99	34	0	2 QH	Bye		0	4	Did not advance					28

Qualification Legend: In Round 1, top 2 (based on faults, not time) in each race advance directly to Heats while the remaining go to Repechage. Starting from Heats, top 2 in each race advance to the next round and rest are eliminated. If tied on number of faults, whoever finishes ahead, moves on. QH= Qualified for Heats; QR= Qualified for Repechage

=== Sprint ===
Mexican canoeists qualified one boat in the following distance for the Games through the 2024 Pan American Canoe Sprint Olympic Qualifiers in Sarasota, USA.

Athlete	Event	Heats		Quarterfinals		Semifinals		Final	
Athlete	Event	Time	Rank	Time	Rank	Time	Rank	Time	Rank
Karina Alanís	Women's K-1 500 metres	1:56.30	6 Q	1:52.86	5 Q	1:53.83	8	Did not advance	27
Beatriz Briones	Women's K-1 500 metres	1:58.10	6 Q	1:53.05	3 Q	1:53.86	5 FC	1:54.53	21
Karina Alanís; Beatriz Briones	Women's K-2 500 metres	1:44.87	5 Q	1:41.45	3 Q	1:40.39	5 FB	1:43.70	10

Rank reflects position within each heat, except for the final where the final overall rank is indicated. Qualification Legend: Q= Qualified to next stage; FA= Qualified to Final A; FB= Qualified to Final B; FC= Qualified to Final C

== Cycling ==
=== Road ===
Mexico entered one female rider to compete in the road race events at the Olympic. The nation's secured those quota through the 2023 Pan Am Championships in Panama.

Athlete	Event	Time	Rank
Marcela Prieto	Women's road race	DNF	

=== Track ===
Mexico entered one men's rider and four women's riders to compete in the following events, based on the nations performances, through the final UCI Olympic rankings.

Sprint

Athlete	Event	Qualification		Round 1	Repechage 1	Round 2	Repechage 2	Round 3	Repechage 3	Quarterfinals	Semifinals	Finals / BM	
Athlete	Event	Time Speed (km/h)	Rank	Opposition Time Speed (km/h)	Opposition Time Speed (km/h)	Opposition Time Speed (km/h)	Opposition Time Speed (km/h)	Opposition Time Speed (km/h)	Opposition Time Speed (km/h)	Opposition Time Speed (km/h)	Opposition Time Speed (km/h)	Opposition Time Speed (km/h)	Rank
Daniela Gaxiola	Women's sprint	10.581; 68.046	17 Q	van de Wouw (NED); L 11.070; 66.158	Vece (ITA); Nicolaes (BEL); W 11.085; 64.953	Capewell (GBR); L 10.887; 66.605	Bayona (COL); L 11.212; 64.976	Did not advance					11
Yuli Verdugo	Women's sprint	10.637; 67.688	19 Q	Hinze (GER); L 11.047; 65.886	van der Peet (NED); Bao (CHN); L 11.156; 64.545	Did not advance							19

Team sprint

Athlete	Event	Qualification		Semifinals		Final	
Athlete	Event	Time Speed (km/h)	Rank	Opposition Time Speed (km/h)	Rank	Opposition Time Speed (km/h)	Rank
Daniela Gaxiola; Jessica Salazar; Yuli Verdugo	Women's team sprint	46.587; 57.956	6 Q	Germany; L 46.198; 58.444	5 Q5-6	China; W 46.251; 58.377	5

Qualification legend: QA=Qualified for Gold; QB=Qualified for Bronze; Q5-6=Qualified to 5th–6th place race; Q7-8=Qualified to 7th–8th place race

Keirin

Athlete	Event	Round 1	Repechage	Quarterfinals	Semifinals	Final
Athlete	Event	Rank	Rank	Rank	Rank	Rank
Daniela Gaxiola	Women's keirin	4 Re	2 QF	4 SF	2 QG	6
Yuli Verdugo	Women's keirin	6 Re	6	Did not advance		

Rank indicates position within each heat. QG=Qualified for Gold; QF=Qualified for Quarterfinals; SF=Qualified for Semifinals; Re=Qualified for Repechage

Omnium

Athlete	Event	Scratch race		Tempo race		Elimination race		Points race		Total	
Athlete	Event	Rank	Points	Rank	Points	Rank	Points	Rank	Points	Rank	Points
Ricardo Peña	Men's omnium	21	1	19	4	20	2	21	−40	21	−33
Victoria Velasco	Women's omnium	20	2	22	−39	20	2	16	3	22	−32

=== Mountain biking ===
Mexican mountain bikers secured two quota places (one per gender) for the Olympic through the 2023 Pan American Championships in Congonhas, Brazil.

Athlete	Event	Time	Rank
Adair Prieto	Men's cross-country	1:31:42	23
Monserrath Rodríguez	Women's cross-country	-4 LAP	33

== Diving ==
Mexican divers secured ten quota places for Paris 2024. One of them attained a runner-up finish from the list of nations eligible for qualification in the men's synchronized platform, with four more spots awarded to the rest of the Mexican diving squad after advancing to the top twelve final of their respective individual events at the 2023 World Aquatics Championships in Fukuoka, Japan. Later on, the nation got four more quotas, through the 2024 World Aquatics Championships in Doha, Qatar.

Athlete	Event	Preliminary		Semifinal		Final	
Athlete	Event	Points	Rank	Points	Rank	Points	Rank
Kevin Muñoz	Men's 3 m springboard	362.05	19	Did not advance			
Osmar Olvera	Men's 3 m springboard	444.15	5 Q	463.75	4 Q	500.40	3rd place, bronze medalist(s)
Juan Celaya; Osmar Olvera	Men's 3 m synchronized springboard	—N/a				444.03	2nd place, silver medalist(s)
Kevin Berlín	Men's 10 m platform	407.15	11 Q	428.65	8 Q	420.65	9
Randal Willars	Men's 10 m platform	460.75	6 Q	432.45	7 Q	478.40	5
Kevin Berlín; Randal Willars	Men's 10 m synchronized platform	—N/a				418.65	4
Alejandra Estudillo	Women's 3 m springboard	276.45	17 Q	317.05	5 Q	301.95	6
Aranza Vázquez	Women's 3 m springboard	321.75	3 Q	248.20	16	Did not advance	
Gabriela Agúndez	Women's 10 m platform	306.95	6 Q	295.00	9 Q	350.40	5
Alejandra Orozco	Women's 10 m platform	320.80	4 Q	312.00	5 Q	320.60	8
Gabriela Agúndez; Alejandra Orozco	Women's 10 m synchronized platform	—N/a				297.66	5

== Equestrian ==
Mexico entered a squad of three jumping riders (plus one reserve rider) into the Olympic equestrian competition, by virtue of the nation's 4th place in the Jumping event at the 2023 Pan American Games.

In July 2024, Antonio Chedraui was replaced, as his horse (H-Lucky Retto), was receiving veterinary care. Federico Fernández originally was set to join as the team's reserve rider, however, he ended up participating instead of Andrés Azcárraga who ended up as the reserve.

=== Jumping ===
Athlete	Horse	Event	Qualification			Final		
Athlete	Horse	Event	Penalties	Time	Rank	Penalties	Time	Rank
Federico Fernández	Romeo	Individual	8	76.58	49	Did not advance		
Eugenio Garza	Contago	Individual	4	77.02	40	Did not advance		
Andrés Azcárraga	Contendros 2	Individual	0	77.21	18 Q	EL		
Federico Fernández; Eugenio Garza; Carlos Hank	Romeo; Contago; H5 Porthos Maestro WH Z	Team	20	230.14	10 Q	WD		

Team Mexico withdrew from the team competition as Hank's horse (H5 Porthos Maestro WH Z) suffered an injury.

== Fencing ==
Mexico qualified one male fencer to the 2024 Summer Olympics through the Zonal Panamerican Olympic Qualifier 2024, in San José, Costa Rica.

Athlete	Event	Round of 64	Round of 32	Round of 16	Quarterfinal	Semifinal	Final / BM	
Athlete	Event	Opposition Score	Opposition Score	Opposition Score	Opposition Score	Opposition Score	Opposition Score	Rank
Gibrán Zea	Men's sabre	Fotouhi (IRI); W 15–13	Bazadze (GEO); L 6–15	Did not advance				32

== Golf ==
Mexico entered four golfers into the Olympic tournament. Carlos Ortiz, Abraham Ancer, María Fassi and Gaby López qualified directly for the games in the men's individual competitions, based on their own world ranking positions, on the IGF World Rankings.

Men

Athlete	Event	Round 1	Round 2	Round 3	Round 4	Total		
Athlete	Event	Score	Score	Score	Score	Score	Par	Rank
Carlos Ortiz	Individual	68	70	70	71	279	−5	T26
Abraham Ancer	Individual	70	71	71	70	282	−2	T35

Women

Athlete	Event	Round 1	Round 2	Round 3	Round 4	Total		
Athlete	Event	Score	Score	Score	Score	Score	Par	Rank
Gaby López	Individual	70	74	76	70	290	+2	T29
María Fassi	Individual	78	82	74	75	309	+21	58

== Gymnastics ==
=== Artistic ===
Mexico entered three female gymnasts into the games, by virtue of the nation's results, through individual all-around and uneven bars result at the 2023 World Artistic Gymnastics Championships in Antwerp, Belgium.

Women

Athlete	Event	Qualification						Final					
Athlete	Event	Apparatus				Total	Rank	Apparatus				Total	Rank
Athlete	Event	V	UB	BB	F	Total	Rank	V	UB	BB	F	Total	Rank
Natalia Escalera	All-around	DNS	12.800	DNS	DNS	DNF	—N/a						
Alexa Moreno	All-around	14.166	12.633	11.200	12.800	50.799	43	Did not advance					
Ahtziri Sandoval	All-around	12.500	12.266	11.733	11.833	48.332	54	Did not advance					

=== Rhythmic ===
Mexico secured the quota in the group all-around event, by virtue of the nation's results, through the nation's silver medal result, at the 2023 Pan Am Games in Santiago, Chile.

Athletes	Event	Qualification				Final			
Athletes	Event	5 apps	3+2 apps	Total	Rank	5 apps.	3+2 apps	Total	Rank
Dalia Alcocer; Sofía Flores; Julia Gutiérrez; Kimberly Salazar; Adirem Tejeda	Group	29.700	27.800	57.500	12	Did not advance			

== Judo ==
Mexico qualified two judokas for the following weight classes at the Games. Paulina Martínez (women's half-lightweight, 52 kg) and Prisca Awiti (women's half-middleweight, 63 kg) got qualified via quota based on IJF World Ranking List and continental quota based on Olympic point rankings.

Athlete	Event	Round of 32	Round of 16	Quarterfinals	Semifinals	Repechage	Final / BM	
Athlete	Event	Opposition Result	Opposition Result	Opposition Result	Opposition Result	Opposition Result	Opposition Result	Rank
Paulina Martínez	Women's −52 kg	Ballhaus (GER); L 0–11	Did not advance					=17
Prisca Awiti	Women's −63 kg	Shaheen (EOR); W 10–0	Szymańska (POL); W 1–0	Piovesana (AUT); W 1–0	Krišto (CRO); W 11–0	—N/a	Leški (SLO); L 1–10	2nd place, silver medalist(s)

== Modern pentathlon ==
Mexican modern pentathletes confirmed four quota places for Paris 2024. Emiliano Hernández secured one of three available berth in the men's event by winning the silver medal at the 2023 World Modern Pentathlon Championships in Bath, Somerset, Great Britain. Meanwhile, Duilio Carrillo and Mayan Oliver secured one of five available spots in their respective event at the 2023 Pan American Games in Santiago, Chile. While Mariana Arceo achieved a quota place through the 2024 Olympic Pentathlon World Ranking.

Key

- Note: The 36 men and 36 women compete in the ranking round. Afterwards, they are split into 2 groups of 18 to complete the semifinal stage. At the end of the semifinal, 9 out of 18 athletes in each group will qualify to the final. Ranks given for each event are within the athlete's group only. Rank in fencing bonus round includes the ranking round score.
- Q = Qualified for the next round

Athlete	Event	RR			Semifinal												RR+SF Points	RR+SF Rank	Final												RR+F Points	Final Rank
Athlete	Event	Fencing			Riding (show jumping)			Fencing (bonus round)			Swimming (200 m freestyle)			Laser Run (10 m laser pistol) / (3000 m)			RR+SF Points	RR+SF Rank	Riding (show jumping)			Fencing (bonus round)			Swimming (200 m freestyle)			Laser Run (10 m laser pistol) / (3000 m)			RR+F Points	Final Rank
Athlete	Event	Wins	Rank	Points	P	Rank	Points	Wins	Rank	Points	Time	Rank	Points	Time	Rank	Points	RR+SF Points	RR+SF Rank	P	Rank	Points	Wins	Rank	Points	Time	Rank	Points	Time	Rank	Points	RR+F Points	Final Rank
Duilio Carrillo	Men's	14	28	195	21	16	279	0	13	0	2:07.39	15	296	10:17.52	10	683	1453	15	Did not advance													29
Emiliano Hernández	Men's	17	21	210	7	7	293	5	7	10	2:04.82	10	301	10:05.89	5	695	1509	3 Q	14	13	286	6	11	12	2:03.39	9	304	9:40.80 WBT	1	720	1532	4
Mariana Arceo	Women's	12	35	185	EL	18	0	4	17	8	2:15.78	6	279	11:38.41	7	602	1074	18	Did not advance													35
Mayan Oliver	Women's	18	12	215	0	6	300	0	8	0	2:26.21	17	258	11:27.41	5	613	1386	11	Did not advance													19

== Rowing ==
Mexican rowers qualified boats in the following classes through the 2023 World Rowing Championships in Belgrade, Serbia; and 2024 Americas Qualification Regatta in Rio de Janeiro, Brazil.

Athlete	Event	Heats		Repechage		Quarterfinals		Semifinals		Final	
Athlete	Event	Time	Rank	Time	Rank	Time	Rank	Time	Rank	Time	Rank
Miguel Carballo; Alexis López	Men's lightweight double sculls	6:37.46	4 R	6:47.60	3 SA/B	—N/a		6:37.43	6 FB	6:25.84	10
Kenia Lechuga	Women's single sculls	7:46.11	3 QF	Bye		7:50.35	5 SC/D	7:58.00	2 FC	7:31.99	16

Qualification Legend: FA=Final A (medal); FB=Final B (non-medal); FC=Final C (non-medal); FD=Final D (non-medal); FE=Final E (non-medal); FF=Final F (non-medal); SA/B=Semifinals A/B; SC/D=Semifinals C/D; SE/F=Semifinals E/F; QF=Quarterfinals; R=Repechage

== Sailing ==
Mexican sailors qualified one boat in each of the following classes through the 2023 Sailing World Championships in The Hague, Netherlands, and 2023 ILCA 6 World Championships in Mar del Plata, Argentina.

Elimination events

Athlete	Event	Opening Series – Points per Race																				Total points	Net points	Rank	Quarterfinal	Semifinal	Finals	Final Rank
Athlete	Event	1	2	3	4	5	6	7	8	9	10	11	12	13	14	15	16	17	18	19	20	Total points	Net points	Rank	Quarterfinal	Semifinal	Finals	Final Rank
Mariana Aguilar	Women's IQFoil	15	7	14	~~BFD~~	~~19~~	18	5	15	16	14	10	3	13	8	Cancelled						182	138	13	Did not advance			13

Two highest race scores get eliminated. Races 15–20 were cancelled.

Medal race events

Athlete	Event	Opening Series – Points per Race											Total points	Net points	Final rank
Athlete	Event	1	2	3	4	5	6	7	8	9	10	M*	Total points	Net points	Final rank
Elena Oetling	Women's ILCA 6	27	~~31~~	17	30	27	25	16	24	5	C	EL	202	171	26

M = Medal race; EL = Eliminated – did not advance into the medal race. Highest race score gets eliminated.

== Shooting ==
Mexican shooters achieved 5 quota places for the following events based on their results at the 2023 Pan American Games and the ISSF reallocation quotas.

Men

Athlete	Event	Qualification		Final	
Athlete	Event	Points	Rank	Points	Rank
Edson Ramírez	10 m air rifle	628.3	19	Did not advance	
Carlos Quezada	10 m air rifle	621.6	44	Did not advance	
Carlos Quezada	50 m rifle 3 positions	579-27x	36	Did not advance	

Women

Athlete	Event	Qualification		Final	
Athlete	Event	Points	Rank	Points	Rank
Goretti Zumaya	10 m air rifle	627.4	20	Did not advance	
Alejandra Zavala	10 m air pistol	573-13x	17	Did not advance	
Alejandra Zavala	25 m pistol	580-17x	20	Did not advance	
Gabriela Rodríguez	Skeet	120+7+0	7	Did not advance	

Mixed

Athlete	Event	Qualification		Final	
Athlete	Event	Points	Rank	Points	Rank
Goretti Zumaya; Edson Ramírez	10 m air rifle team	628.6	7	Did not advance	

== Surfing ==
Mexico surfers confirmed one shortboard quota places for Tahiti. Alan Cleland topped the list of eligible surfers from African continent re-allocation quotas in the men's shortboard races at the 2023 ISA World Surfing Games in Surf City, El Salvador.

Athlete	Event	Round 1		Round 2	Round 3	Quarterfinal	Semifinal	Final / BM	
Athlete	Event	Score	Rank	Opposition Result	Opposition Result	Opposition Result	Opposition Result	Opposition Result	Rank
Alan Cleland	Men's shortboard	14.34	2 R2	Criere (ESP); W 15.17–4.43	Duru (FRA); L 15.17–18.13	Did not advance			=9

== Swimming ==
Mexican swimmers achieved the entry standards in the following events for Paris 2024 (a maximum of two swimmers under the Olympic Qualifying Time (OST) and potentially at the Olympic Consideration Time (OCT)):

Men

Athlete	Event	Heat		Semifinal		Final	
Athlete	Event	Time	Rank	Time	Rank	Time	Rank
Gabriel Castaño	50 m freestyle	21.89	=11 Q	21.99	15	Did not advance	
Jorge Iga	100 m freestyle	49.28	32	Did not advance			
Jorge Iga	200 m freestyle	1:48.38	20	Did not advance			
Miguel de Lara	100 m breaststroke	DSQ		—N/a			
Miguel de Lara	200 m breaststroke	2:11.16	17 q	2:11.28	16	Did not advance	
Paulo Strehlke	10 km open water	—N/a				1:56:28.4	12

Women

Athlete	Event	Heat		Semifinal		Final	
Athlete	Event	Time	Rank	Time	Rank	Time	Rank
Celia Pulido	100 m backstroke	1:01.10	21	Did not advance			
Martha Sandoval	10 km open water	—N/a				2:07:24.9	19

Qualification Legend: q=Reserve, qualified due to the retirement of another competitor

== Table tennis ==
Mexico entered two table tennis players into Paris 2024. Marcos Madrid and Arantxa Cossio Aceves qualified for the games following the triumph of winning one of four available quota places, each in their respective event, at the 2024 Pan American Qualification Tournament in Lima, Peru.

Athlete	Event	Round of 64	Round of 32	Round of 16	Quarterfinals	Semifinals	Final / BM	
Athlete	Event	Opposition Result	Opposition Result	Opposition Result	Opposition Result	Opposition Result	Opposition Result	Rank
Marcos Madrid	Men's singles	Ovtcharov (GER); L (3–11, 7–11, 3–11, 5–11)	Did not advance					=33
Arantxa Cossío	Women's singles	Polcanova (AUT); L (4–11, 3–11, 4–11, 8–11)	Did not advance					=33

== Taekwondo ==
Mexico qualified two athletes to compete at the games. Daniela Souza and Carlos Sansores qualified for Paris 2024 by virtue of finishing within the top five in the Olympic rankings in their respective division.

Athlete	Event	Qualification	Round of 16	Quarterfinals	Semifinals	Repechage	Final / BM	
Athlete	Event	Opposition Result	Opposition Result	Opposition Result	Opposition Result	Opposition Result	Opposition Result	Rank
Carlos Sansores	Men's +80 kg	Bye	Gomis (GBS); W 2–0	Salimi (IRI); L 1–2	—N/a	Rafalovich (UZB); W 2–1	Cissé (CIV); L 1–2	=5
Daniela Souza	Women's −49 kg	Bye	Dhahri (TUN); L 1–2	Did not advance				=11

== Triathlon ==
Mexico achieved four quota places (two per gender) for the triathlon competition at the 2024 Summer Olympics through the Triathlon Olympic Ranking.

Individual

Athlete	Event	Time						Rank
Athlete	Event	Swim (1.5 km)	Trans 1	Bike (40 km)	Trans 2	Run (10 km)	Total	Rank
Crisanto Grajales	Men's	21:24	0:53	54:34	0:26	32:45	1:50:02	39
Aram Peñaflor	Men's	23:07	0:49	54:27	0:27	32:56	1:51:46	47
Lizeth Rueda	Women's	23:55	0:55	57:58	0:38	37:52	2:01:18	30
Rosa María Tapia	Women's	24:12	0:53	57:44	0:27	35:13	1:58:29	18

Relay

Athlete	Event	Time						Rank
Athlete	Event	Swim (300 m)	Trans 1	Bike (7 km)	Trans 2	Run (2 km)	Total group	Rank
Aram Peñaflor	Mixed relay	4:24	1:03	9:28	0:26	5:13	20:34	—N/a
Rosa María Tapia	Mixed relay	4:55	1:04	10:25	0:26	5:41	22:31	—N/a
Crisanto Grajales	Mixed relay	4:32	1:02	10:00	0:27	5:44	21:45	—N/a
Lizeth Rueda	Mixed relay	5:32	1:08	10:55	0:31	6:24	24:30	—N/a
Total	Mixed relay	—N/a					1:29:20	13

== Weightlifting ==
Mexico qualified one weightlifter into the Olympic competition. Janeth Gómez (women's 59 kg) secured one of the top ten slots, each in their respective weight divisions based on the IWF Olympic Qualification Rankings.

Athlete	Event	Snatch		Clean & Jerk		Total	Rank
Athlete	Event	Result	Rank	Result	Rank	Total	Rank
Janeth Gómez	Women's −59 kg	95	11	122	8	217	8

== Wrestling ==
Mexico qualified two wrestler for the following events. Roman Bravo-Young and Austin Gómez, qualified for the games, by advancing to the final match in their own division, through the 2024 Pan American Wrestling Olympic Qualification Tournament in Acapulco.

Key:

- VT (ranking points: 5–0 or 0–5) – Victory by fall.
- VB (ranking points: 5–0 or 0–5) – Victory by injury (VF for forfeit, VA for withdrawal or disqualification)
- PP (ranking points: 3–1 or 1–3) – Decision by points – the loser with technical points.
- PO (ranking points: 3–0 or 0–3) – Decision by points – the loser without technical points.
- ST (ranking points: 4–0 or 0–4) – Great superiority – the loser without technical points and a margin of victory of at least 8 (Greco-Roman) or 10 (freestyle) points.
- SP (ranking points: 4–1 or 1–4) – Technical superiority – the loser with technical points and a margin of victory of at least 8 (Greco-Roman) or 10 (freestyle) points.

Freestyle

Athlete	Event	Round of 16	Quarterfinal	Semifinal	Repechage	Final / BM	
Athlete	Event	Opposition Result	Opposition Result	Opposition Result	Opposition Result	Opposition Result	Rank
Roman Bravo-Young	Men's −57 kg	Harutyunyan (ARM); L 3–13^{SP}	Did not advance				12
Austin Gómez	Men's −65 kg	Aliyev (AZE); L 0–7^{PO}	Did not advance				12

== See also ==
- Mexico at the 2023 Pan American Games
- Mexico at the 2024 Summer Paralympics
- Mexico at the 2024 Winter Youth Olympics
