= Pan American Artistic Gymnastics Championships – Women's vault =

The Pan American Gymnastics Championships were first held in 1997.

Three medals are awarded: gold for first place, silver for second place, and bronze for third place.

== Medalists ==
| Year | Location | Gold | Silver | Bronze | Ref |
|---|---|---|---|---|---|
| 1997 | (Colombia) Medellín | (Mexico) Denisse López | (Mexico) Brenda Magaña | (Cuba) Leyanet González | |
| 2001 | (Mexico) Cancún | (Cuba) Janerki de la Peña | (United States) Tasha Schwikert | (Brazil) Daiane dos Santos | |
| 2004 | (Venezuela) Maracaibo | (United States) Alicia Sacramone | (United States) Melanie Sinclair | (Argentina) Celeste Andrea Carnevale | |
| 2005 | (Brazil) Rio de Janeiro | (United States) Alicia Sacramone | (United States) Jana Bieger | (Brazil) Laís Souza | |
| 2008 | (Argentina) Rosario | (United States) Corrie Lothrop | (United States) Olivia Courtney | (Argentina) Ayelén Tarabini (Puerto Rico) Sidney Sanabria-Robles | |
| 2010 | (Mexico) Guadalajara | (United States) McKayla Maroney | (Brazil) Daniele Hypólito | (Colombia) Jessica Gil Ortiz | |
| 2012 | (Colombia) Medellín | (Dominican Republic) Yamilet Peña | (Puerto Rico) Paula Mejías | (Brazil) Adrian Gomes | |
| 2013 | (Puerto Rico) San Juan | (Cuba) Dovélis Torres | (Brazil) Letícia Costa | (Peru) Sandra Collantes | |
| 2014 | (Canada) Mississauga | (United States) MyKayla Skinner | (Cuba) Yesenia Ferrera | (Cuba) Dovélis Torres | |
| 2016 | (Bolivia) Sucre | (Mexico) Nicolle Castro | (Brazil) Letícia Costa | (Argentina) Esperanza Fernandez | |
| 2017 | (Peru) Lima | (Mexico) Ahtziri Sandoval | (Canada) Brooklyn Moors | (Colombia) Dayana Ardila | |
| 2018 | (Peru) Lima | (United States) Jade Carey | (Cuba) Marcia Videaux | (United States) Grace McCallum | |
| 2021 | (Brazil) Rio de Janeiro | (Mexico) Natalia Escalera | (Panama) Hillary Heron | (Ecuador) Alaís Perea | |
| 2022 | (Brazil) Rio de Janeiro | (Panama) Karla Navas | (Mexico) Natalia Escalera | (Mexico) Ahtziri Sandoval | |
| 2023 | (Colombia) Medellín | (Mexico) Alexa Moreno | (United States) Joscelyn Roberson | (Mexico) Natalia Escalera | |
| 2024 | (Colombia) Santa Marta | (Panama) Karla Navas | (Panama) Hillary Heron | (Canada) Emma Spence | |
| 2025 | Panama City | (Panama) Karla Navas | (Canada) Lia Monica Fontaine | (United States) Jayla Hang | |
| 2026 | (Brazil) Rio de Janeiro | (Brazil) Rebeca Andrade | (Canada) Lia Monica Fontaine | (United States) Claire Pease | |

== Medal table ==
| Rank | Nation | Gold | Silver | Bronze | Total |
|---|---|---|---|---|---|
| 1 | United States (USA) | 6 | 5 | 3 | 14 |
| 2 | Mexico (MEX) | 5 | 2 | 2 | 9 |
| 3 | Panama (PAN) | 3 | 2 | 0 | 5 |
| 4 | Cuba (CUB) | 2 | 2 | 2 | 6 |
| 5 | Brazil (BRA) | 1 | 3 | 3 | 7 |
| 6 | Dominican Republic (DOM) | 1 | 0 | 0 | 1 |
| 7 | Canada (CAN) | 0 | 3 | 1 | 4 |
| 8 | Puerto Rico (PUR) | 0 | 1 | 1 | 2 |
| 9 | Argentina (ARG) | 0 | 0 | 3 | 3 |
| 10 | Colombia (COL) | 0 | 0 | 2 | 2 |
| 11 | Ecuador (ECU) | 0 | 0 | 1 | 1 |
| 11 | Peru (PER) | 0 | 0 | 1 | 1 |
| Totals (12 entries) | | 18 | 18 | 19 | 55 |
