= Gymnastics at the 2023 Pan American Games – Women's rhythmic group all-around =

Women's rhythmic group all-around at the 2023 Pan American Games
- Venue: Training Center for Collective Sport
- Dates: November 2
- Competitors: 35 from 7 nations
- Winning score: 64.450

Medalists
Gold medal	Bárbara Urquiza; Victória Borges; Gabriella Coradine; Giovanna Oliveira; Nicole Pircio	Brazil
Silver medal	Julia Gutiérrez; Ana Flores; Kimberly Salazar; Adirem Tejeda; Dalia Alcocer	Mexico
Bronze medal	Isabelle Connor; Gergana Petkova; Katrine Sakhnov; Karolina Saverino; Hana Starkman	United States

The women's rhythmic group all-around competition of the rhythmic gymnastics events at the 2023 Pan American Games was held on November 2, at the Training Center for Collective Sport in the National Stadium cluster in Santiago, Chile.

== Schedule ==
Date	Time	Round
November 2, 2023	18:30	Final

== Results ==
The results were as follows:

Position	Gymnast	5 Hoops	3 Ribbons, 2 Balls	Total
1st place, gold medalist(s)	Brazil; Bárbara Urquiza; Victória Borges; Gabriella Coradine; Giovanna Oliveira; Nicole Pircio	35.400 (1)	29.050 (1)	64.450
2nd place, silver medalist(s)	Mexico; Julia Gutiérrez; Ana Flores; Kimberly Salazar; Adirem Tejeda; Dalia Alcocer	34.150 (2)	27.600 (2)	61.750
3rd place, bronze medalist(s)	United States; Isabelle Connor; Gergana Petkova; Katrine Sakhnov; Karolina Saverino; Hana Starkman	31.500 (3)	26.800 (3)	58.300
4	Venezuela; María Domínguez; Rocelyn Palencia; Yelbery Rodríguez; Gabriela Rodríguez; Isabella Bellizzio	26.650 (6)	23.200 (4)	49.850
5	Colombia; Kizzy Rivas; Natalia Jiménez; Karen Duarte; Laura Patiño; Adriana Mantilla	26.250 (7)	20.550 (5)	46.800
6	Canada; Katherina Bakhmutova; Emily Huseynov; Karina Kamenetsky; Christina Savchenko; Victoria Smolianova	28.650 (4)	17.800 (7)	46.450
7	Chile; Anneli Sepúlveda; Martina Espejo; Josefina Romero; Isabel Lozano; Annabela Ley	26.650 (5)	19.650 (6)	46.300
