= Julia Gutiérrez =

Mexican rhythmic gymnast

- Full name: Julia Irene Gutiérrez Pereyra
- Nickname: July
- Born: 13 September 2007 (age 18) Mérida, Yucatán, Mexico

Gymnastics career
- Discipline: Rhythmic gymnastics
- Country represented: Mexico
- Training location: Mexico City, Mexico
- Club: Club Heymo
- Head coach: Blajaith Aguilar
Medal record
Rhythmic Gymnastics
Representing Mexico
Pan American Games
Silver medal – second place	2023 Santiago	Group all-around
Silver medal – second place	2023 Santiago	5 Hoops
Silver medal – second place	2023 Santiago	3 Ribbons + 2 Balls
Pan American Championships
Gold medal – first place	2024 Guatemala City	Group all-around
Gold medal – first place	2024 Guatemala City	3 Ribbons + 2 Balls
Silver medal – second place	2023 Guadalajara	Group all-around
Silver medal – second place	2023 Guadalajara	5 Hoops
Silver medal – second place	2023 Guadalajara	3 Ribbons + 2 Balls
Silver medal – second place	2024 Guatemala City	5 Hoops
Bronze medal – third place	2026 Rio de Janeiro	Group All-Around
Bronze medal – third place	2026 Rio de Janeiro	5 Balls
Central American and Caribbean Games
Gold medal – first place	2023 San Salvador	Group all-around
Gold medal – first place	2023 San Salvador	5 Hoops
Gold medal – first place	2023 San Salvador	3 Ribbons + 2 Balls
Gold medal – first place	2026 Santo Domingo	Group All-Around

Julia Irene Gutiérrez Pereyra (born 13 September 2007) is a Mexican rhythmic gymnast. As a member of the senior national group, she is a three-time Pan American Games silver medalist, a two-time Pan American champion, and a three-time Central American and Caribbean Games champion. She represented Mexico at the 2024 Summer Olympics.

== Career ==
=== 2023 ===
Gutiérrez became age-eligible for senior international competition in 2023 and joined Mexico's senior group. The group began the season at the 2023 Portimão World Cup, finishing seventh in the all-around and fifth in the 5 hoops final. Then at the Pan American Championships in Guadalajara, the group won silver medals in the all-around and both event finals, all behind Brazil. With these results, Mexico qualified groups for the upcoming World Championships and Pan American Games. The next month, the group swept the gold medals at the Central American and Caribbean Games.

Gutiérrez won a bronze medal with the Mexican group at the World Challenge Cup event in Cluj-Napoca in the 5 hoops event final. They also placed eighth in the all-around and seventh in 3 ribbons and 2 balls. Then at the final World Cup event in Milan, they finished 13th in the all-around. She then competed at the 2023 World Championships in Valencia alongside Dalia Alcocer, Sofia Flores, Kimberly Salazar, Adirem Tejeda and Karen Villanueva. The group finished 14th in the all-around and qualified for the 3 ribbons and 2 balls final, where they finished eighth.

In October, Gutiérrez and the Mexican group traveled to Israel for a training camp, but they had to be rescued by the Mexican Air Force because of the start of the Gaza war. Three weeks later, they competed at the Pan American Games and won the silver medal in the all-around. As the highest-placing team that had not already qualified for the 2024 Summer Olympics, Mexico earned its first-ever Olympic berth in group rhythmic gymnastics. Additionally, the group won the silver medals in both event finals.

=== 2024 ===
Gutiérrez and the Mexican group won a bronze medal in the 5 hoops final at the 2024 Sofia World Cup. The next month, the won a silver medal in 3 ribbons and 2 balls at the Portimão World Challenge Cup, and they finished fourth in 5 hoops. They then won the all-around title at the 2024 Pan American Championships. Then in the event finals, they won another gold medal in 3 ribbons and 2 balls and a silver medal in 5 hoops. Gutiérrez represented Mexico at the 2024 Summer Olympics alongside Dalia Alcocer, Sofia Flores, Kimberly Salazar, and Adirem Tejeda. The group finished 12th in the qualification round, missing out on the group all-around final.

=== 2026 ===
In 2026, Gutiérrez was one of four gymnasts on the national team to lodge a complaint against their coach, Blajaith Aguilar, alleging physical and psychological abuse dating back to 2017, such as being forced to train long hours without a chance to eat. They alleged that reporting the abuse led to them being removed from the national team. CONADE provided the gymnasts with a training location and support. Aguilar denied the allegations.
