= Gymnastics at the 2023 Pan American Games – Women's rhythmic group 3 ribbons + 2 balls =

Women's rhythmic group 3 ribbons + 2 balls at the 2023 Pan American Games
- Venue: Training Center for Collective Sport
- Dates: November 4
- Competitors: 35 from 7 nations
- Winning score: 31.800

Medalists
Gold medal	Bárbara Urquiza; Victória Borges; Gabriella Coradine; Giovanna Oliveira; Nicole Pircio	Brazil
Silver medal	Julia Gutiérrez; Ana Flores; Kimberly Salazar; Adirem Tejeda; Dalia Alcocer	Mexico
Bronze medal	Isabelle Connor; Gergana Petkova; Katrine Sakhnov; Karolina Saverino; Hana Starkman	United States

The women's rhythmic group 3 ribbons + 2 balls competition of the rhythmic gymnastics events at the 2023 Pan American Games was held on November 4, at the Training Center for Collective Sport in the National Stadium cluster in Santiago, Chile.

== Schedule ==
Date	Time	Round
November 4, 2023	18:30	Final

== Results ==
The results were as follows:

Position	Gymnasts	Execution	Artistry	Difficulty	Penalty	Total
1st place, gold medalist(s)	Brazil; Bárbara Urquiza; Victória Borges; Gabriella Coradine; Giovanna Oliveira; Nicole Pircio	6.850	8.050	16.9		31.800
2nd place, silver medalist(s)	Mexico; Julia Gutiérrez; Ana Flores; Kimberly Salazar; Adirem Tejeda; Dalia Alcocer	6.250	7.300	14.7	-0.05	28.200
3rd place, bronze medalist(s)	United States; Isabelle Connor; Gergana Petkova; Katrine Sakhnov; Karolina Saverino; Hana Starkman	5.500	6.850	13.9		26.250
4	Colombia; Kizzy Rivas; Natalia Jiménez; Karen Duarte; Laura Patiño; Adriana Mantilla	3.750	6.250	12.4	-0.05	22.350
5	Chile; Anneli Sepúlveda; Martina Espejo; Josefina Romero; Isabel Lozano; Annabela Ley	3.750	6.350	11.2		21.300
6	Venezuela; María Domínguez; Rocelyn Palencia; Yelbery Rodríguez; Gabriela Rodríguez; Isabella Bellizzio	3.300	6.150	11.7		21.150
7	Canada; Katherina Bakhmutova; Emily Huseynov; Karina Kamenetsky; Christina Savchenko; Victoria Smolianova	3.250	6.200	12.0	-0.30	21.150
