= Gymnastics at the 2023 Pan American Games – Women's artistic individual all-around =

Women's artistic individual all-around at the 2023 Pan American Games
- Venue: Training Center for Collective Sport
- Dates: October 23
- Competitors: 24 from 15 nations
- Winning score: 54.699

Medalists
Gold medal	Kayla DiCello	United States
Silver medal	Flávia Saraiva	Brazil
Bronze medal	Jordan Chiles	United States

The women's artistic individual all-around gymnastic event at the 2023 Pan American Games was held on October 23 at the Training Center for Collective Sport in Santiago, Chile.

== Results ==
=== Final ===
Rank	Gymnast	Vault (gymnastics)	Uneven bars	Balance beam	Floor (gymnastics)	Total
1st place, gold medalist(s)	Kayla DiCello (USA)	14.133	13.633	13.200	13.733	54.699
2nd place, silver medalist(s)	Flávia Saraiva (BRA)	13.966	13.533	14.166	12.900	54.565
3rd place, bronze medalist(s)	Jordan Chiles (USA)	14.300	12.700	13.466	13.533	53.999
4	Jade Barbosa (BRA)	13.900	13.100	12.900	13.433	53.333
5	Ava Stewart (CAN)	13.333	13.433	13.266	12.466	52.498
6	Natalia Escalera (MEX)	13.633	12.600	12.666	12.933	51.832
7	Aurélie Tran (CAN)	13.133	11.766	12.666	12.900	50.465
8	Luisa Blanco (COL)	13.633	11.700	12.200	12.566	50.099
9	Ahtziri Sandoval (MEX)	13.900	12.933	11.200	11.933	49.966
10	Hillary Heron (PAN)	13.066	11.866	11.833	12.533	49.298
11	Milagros Curti Ruiz (ARG)	12.066	11.933	12.666	12.133	48.798
12	Karla Navas (PAN)	12.933	12.566	11.300	11.466	48.265
13	Lynnzee Brown (HAI)	13.400	11.000	11.533	12.200	48.133
14	Alais Perea (ECU)	12.866	11.566	11.200	11.633	47.265
15	Makarena Pinto (CHI)	12.566	11.500	11.233	11.833	47.132
16	Nicole Iribarne (ARG)	12.666	11.900	10.600	11.933	47.099
17	Alexa Grande (ESA)	12.533	10.700	11.333	11.966	46.532
18	Anya Pilgrim (BAR)	12.900	10.733	10.500	11.633	45.766
19	Ashley Bohórquez (ECU)	12.766	10.300	10.600	12.066	45.732
20	Franciny Morales (CRC)	12.566	10.966	10.400	11.133	45.065
21	Deborah Salmina (VEN)	12.633	10.800	10.033	11.466	44.932
22	Stella Diaz Muñiz (PUR)	12.033	10.066	10.900	11.433	44.432
23	Alejandra Díaz (PUR)	12.633	10.600	9.133	11.266	43.632
24	Bárbara Achondo (CHI)	11.400	8.266	11.100	12.333	43.099

=== Qualification ===
Rank	Gymnast	Vault (gymnastics)	Uneven bars	Balance beam	Floor (gymnastics)	Total	Qual.
1	Jordan Chiles (USA)	14.366	14.100	13.000	13.200	54.666	Q
2	Kayla DiCello (USA)	14.066	13.800	13.066	13.633	54.565	Q
3	Flávia Saraiva (BRA)	14.000	13.633	13.433	13.400	54.466	Q
4	Tiana Sumanasekera (USA)	14.100	12.900	13.066	13.000	53.066	–
5	Aurélie Tran (CAN)	13.200	13.400	12.866	12.666	52.132	Q
6	Ava Stewart (CAN)	13.300	12.400	13.666	12.466	51.832	Q
7	Ahtziri Sandoval (MEX)	13.866	13.333	11.866	11.900	50.965	Q
8	Jade Barbosa (BRA)	13.800	10.933	12.600	13.333	50.666	Q
9	Natalia Escalera (MEX)	13.366	12.266	11.966	12.400	49.998	Q
10	Luisa Blanco (COL)	13.266	11.966	12.266	11.933	49.431	Q
11	Sydney Turner (CAN)	12.966	11.000	12.633	12.500	49.099	–
12	Nicole Iribarne (ARG)	12.766	12.000	12.133	11.833	48.732	–
13	Milagros Curti Ruiz (ARG)	12.833	11.200	11.466	12.433	47.932	Q
14	Lynnzee Brown (HAI)	13.400	11.066	11.300	11.866	47.632	Q
15	Paulina Campos (MEX)	11.566	12.600	11.200	11.833	47.199	–
16	Lucila Estarli (ARG)	12.766	11.100	11.933	11.100	46.899	–
17	Alais Perea (ECU)	12.633	11.700	10.833	11.533	46.699	Q
18	Karla Navas (PAN)	12.366	11.466	11.266	11.433	46.531	Q
19	Bárbara Achondo (CHI)	11.366	11.433	11.033	12.633	46.465	Q
20	Hillary Heron (PAN)	11.100	11.733	10.600	12.966	46.399	Q
21	Alexa Grande (ESA)	12.533	10.800	11.100	11.966	46.399	Q
22	Lana Herrera (PAN)	11.933	11.200	11.400	11.500	46.033	–
23	Makarena Pinto (CHI)	12.766	11.133	9.866	12.033	45.798	Q
24	Stella Diaz Muñiz (PUR)	12.366	10.733	11.700	10.866	45.665	Q
25	Leila Martínez (ARG)	12.000	11.866	11.366	10.233	45.465	–
26	Alejandra Díaz (PUR)	12.533	10.933	11.566	10.400	45.432	Q
27	Anya Pilgram (BAR)	12.800	9.900	11.400	11.266	45.366	Q
28	Franciny Morales (CRC)	12.666	10.733	10.333	11.600	45.332	Q
29	Karelys Diaz (PUR)	12.533	11.000	9.800	11.566	44.899	–
30	Deborah Salmina (VEN)	12.533	10.733	9.633	11.733	44.632	Q
31	Ashley Bohórquez (ECU)	11.600	11.766	9.166	11.933	44.465	Q
32	Anelena Rodríguez (CRC)	12.333	11.533	9.166	10.833	43.865	R1
33	Ginna Escobar (COL)	12.666	11.700	9.033	10.166	43.565	R2
34	Ana Karina Méndez (PER)	11.933	11.900	9.166	10.066	43.065	R3
