= Gymnastics at the 2023 Central American and Caribbean Games =

Aspect of the 2023 Central American and Caribbean Games

- Venue: Polideportivo Ciudad Merliot
- Location: San Salvador, El Salvador
- Dates: 25 June – 7 July
- Competitors: 151

The gymnastics competition at the 2023 Central American and Caribbean Games was held in San Salvador, El Salvador, from 27 June to 7 July 2023 at the Polideportivo Ciudad Merliot.

== Medal table ==
* Host nation (El Salvador)

Rank	Nation	Gold	Silver	Bronze	Total
1	Mexico (MEX)	19	7	4	30
2	Colombia (COL)	2	5	9	16
3	Cuba (CUB)	2	5	1	8
4	Panama (PAN)	1	3	2	6
5	Dominican Republic (DOM)	1	3	1	5
6	Centro Caribe Sports (CCS)	1	0	0	1
7	Venezuela (VEN)	0	3	4	7
8	Puerto Rico (PUR)	0	0	3	3
9	El Salvador (ESA)*	0	0	1	1
9	Jamaica (JAM)	0	0	1	1
Totals (10 entries)		26	26	26	78

== Medal summary ==
=== Artistic ===
==== Men's events ====
Event	Gold	Silver	Bronze
Team All-Around	Mexico (MEX); Isaac Núñez; Fabian De Luna; Josué Juárez; Maximiliano Galicia; Rodrigo Gomez	Cuba (CUB); Alejandro de la Cruz; Diorges Escobar; José Escandon; Pablo Pozo; Yohendry Villaverde	Colombia (COL); Andrés Martínez; Dilan Jiménez; José Martínez; Sergio Vargas; Kristopher Bohórquez
Individual All-Around	Diorges Escobar; Cuba	Audrys Nin Reyes; Dominican Republic	Dilan Jiménez; Colombia
Floor	Jorge Vega; Centro Caribe Sports (Note: In late 2022 the IOC banned the NOC of Guatemala. Athletes from Guatemala were unable to represent their country and compete under the country's flag.)	Adickxon Trejo; Venezuela	Dilan Jiménez; Colombia
Pommel Horse	Isaac Núñez; Mexico	José Martínez; Colombia	Audrys Nin Reyes; Dominican Republic
Rings	Kristopher Bohórquez; Colombia	Alejandro de la Cruz; Cuba	José López; Puerto Rico
Vault	Audrys Nin Reyes; Dominican Republic	Yohendry Villaverde; Cuba	Fabian de Luna; Mexico
Parallel Bars	Isaac Nuñez; Mexico	Pablo Pozo; Cuba	Adickxon Trejo; Venezuela
Horizontal Bar	Diorges Escobar; Cuba	Audrys Nin Reyes; Dominican Republic	Andres Perez; Puerto Rico

==== Women's events ====
Event	Gold	Silver	Bronze
Team All-Around	Mexico (MEX); Ahtziri Sandoval; Alexa Moreno; Cassandra Loustalot; Natalia Escalera; Paulina Campos	Panama (PAN); Hillary Heron; Karla Navas; Lana Herrera; Lucía Paulino; Valentina Brostella	Colombia (COL); Angelica Mesa; Ginna Escobar; Maria Villegas; Yiseth Valenzuela; Karen Cubillos
Individual All-Around	Karla Navas; Panama	Alexa Moreno; Mexico	Hillary Heron; Panama
Vault	Alexa Moreno; Mexico	Yamilet Peña; Dominican Republic	Ahtziri Sandoval; Mexico
Uneven Bars	Paulina Campos; Mexico	Karla Navas; Panama	Tyesha Mattis; Jamaica
Balance Beam	Paulina Campos; Mexico	Karla Navas; Panama	Alexa Moreno; Mexico
Floor	Alexa Moreno; Mexico	Natalia Escalera; Mexico	Hillary Heron; Panama

=== Rhythmic ===
==== Individual ====
Event	Gold	Silver	Bronze
Team All-Around	Mexico (MEX); Marina Malpica; Ledia Juárez; Karla Diaz	Colombia (COL); Oriana Viñas; Vanessa Galindo; Lina Dussan	Puerto Rico (PUR); Camille Maldonado; Danna Cortes; Giuliana Cusnier
Individual All-Around	Marina Malpica; Mexico	Lina Dussan; Colombia	Ledia Juárez; Mexico
Hoop	Marina Malpica; Mexico	Karla Diaz; Mexico	Lina Dussan; Colombia
Ball	Marina Malpica; Mexico	Ledia Juárez; Mexico	Oriana Viñas; Colombia
Clubs	Ledia Juárez; Mexico	Marina Malpica; Mexico	Lina Dussan; Colombia
Ribbon	Marina Malpica; Mexico	Ledia Juárez; Mexico	Gretel Mendoza; Cuba

==== Group ====
Event	Gold	Silver	Bronze
All-Around	Mexico (MEX); Kimberly Salazar; Julia Gutierrez; Ana Flores; Adirem Tejeda; Dalia Alcocer	Venezuela (VEN); Rocelyn Palencia; Yelbery Rodriguez; Maria Dominguez; Isabella Bellizzio; Dahilin Parra	Colombia (COL); Adriana Mantilla; Karen Duarte; Laura Patiño; Kizzy Rivas; Natalia Jiménez
5 Hoops	Mexico (MEX); Kimberly Salazar; Julia Gutierrez; Ana Flores; Adirem Tejeda; Dalia Alcocer	Colombia (COL); Adriana Mantilla; Karen Duarte; Laura Patiño; Kizzy Rivas; Natalia Jiménez	Venezuela (VEN); Rocelyn Palencia; Yelbery Rodriguez; Maria Dominguez; Isabella Bellizzio; Dahilin Parra
3 Ribbons & 2 Balls	Mexico (MEX); Kimberly Salazar; Julia Gutierrez; Ana Flores; Adirem Tejeda; Dalia Alcocer	Venezuela (VEN); Rocelyn Palencia; Yelbery Rodriguez; Maria Dominguez; Isabella Bellizzio; Dahilin Parra	Colombia (COL); Adriana Mantilla; Karen Duarte; Laura Patiño; Kizzy Rivas; Natalia Jiménez

=== Trampoline ===
Event	Gold	Silver	Bronze
Men's Individual	José Marin; Mexico	Adrian Martinez; Mexico	Sebastian Marquez; Venezuela
Men's Synchronised	Mexico (MEX); José Marin; Adrian Martinez	Cuba (CUB); Cristian Tamayo; Jardiel Crespo	Venezuela (VEN); Sebastian Marquez; Miguel Benavides
Women's Individual	Katish Hernández; Colombia	Alison Ossa; Colombia	Jessica Hernandez; El Salvador
