= 2022 Pan American Gymnastics Championships =

Gymnastics event in Rio de Janeiro, Brazil

Pan American Gymnastics Championships
- Venue: Carioca Arena 1
- Location: Rio de Janeiro, Brazil
- Date: June 26 – July 17, 2022

The 2022 Pan American Gymnastics Championships was held in Rio de Janeiro, Brazil starting in June 2022. Three gymnastics disciplines were contested: artistic gymnastics (from July 15–17), rhythmic gymnastics (from July 7–10), and trampoline (from June 26–28).

== Medalists ==
=== Artistic gymnastics ===
==== Senior ====
Event	Gold	Silver	Bronze
Men
Team all-around	United States; Taylor Burkhart; Riley Loos; Brody Malone; Yul Moldauer; Colt Walker; Shane Wiskus	Brazil; Lucas Bitencourt; Arthur Mariano; Patrick Sampaio; Diogo Soares; Caio Souza; Arthur Zanetti	Canada; Félix Dolci; Mathys Jalbert; Chris Kaji; Jayson Rampersad; Kenji Tamane
Individual all-around	Caio Souza (BRA)	Yul Moldauer (USA)	Félix Dolci (CAN)
Floor exercise	Yul Moldauer (USA)	Riley Loos (USA)	Félix Dolci (CAN)
Pommel horse	Yul Moldauer (USA)	Jayson Rampersad (CAN)	Andrés Martínez (COL)
Rings	Arthur Zanetti (BRA)	Caio Souza (BRA)	Riley Loos (USA)
Vault	Caio Souza (BRA)	Félix Dolci (CAN)	Daniel Villafañe (ARG)
Parallel bars	Yul Moldauer (USA)	Colt Walker (USA)	Caio Souza (BRA)
Horizontal bar	Brody Malone (USA)	Caio Souza (BRA)	Arthur Mariano (BRA)
Women
Team all-around	Brazil; Rebeca Andrade; Christal Bezerra; Lorrane Oliveira; Carolyne Pedro; Flávia Saraiva; Júlia Soares	United States; Skye Blakely; Kayla DiCello; Addison Fatta; Zoe Miller; Elle Mueller; Lexi Zeiss	Canada; Shallon Olsen; Denelle Pedrick; Ava Stewart; Sydney Turner; Rose-Kaying Woo
Individual all-around	Flávia Saraiva (BRA)	Lexi Zeiss (USA)	Skye Blakely (USA)
Vault	Karla Navas (PAN)	Natalia Escalera (MEX)	Ahtziri Sandoval (MEX)
Uneven bars	Rebeca Andrade (BRA)	Zoe Miller (USA)	Sydney Turner (CAN)
Balance beam	Flávia Saraiva (BRA)	Rebeca Andrade (BRA)	Lexi Zeiss (USA)
Floor exercise	Kayla DiCello (USA)	Flávia Saraiva (BRA)	Skye Blakely (USA)

==== Junior ====
Event	Gold	Silver	Bronze
Men
Team all-around	United States; Toby Liang; Alexandru Nitache; Cole Partridge; Fred Richard; Nathan Roman	Canada; Victor Canuel; Kai Iwaasa; Trentin Milligan; Xavier Olasz	Brazil; Guilherme Amorim; Bernardo Ferreira; Bruno Juvêncio; João Perdigão; Kayke Santos
Individual all-around	Fred Richard (USA)	Ángel Barajas (COL)	Camilo Vera (COL)
Floor exercise	Fred Richard (USA)	Ángel Barajas (COL)	Cole Partridge (USA)
Pommel horse	Camilo Vera (COL)	Xavier Olasz (CAN)	Fred Richard (USA)
Rings	Fred Richard (USA)	Ariel Villalobos (CRC)	Cole Partridge (USA)
Vault	Fred Richard (USA)	Ángel Barajas (COL)	Yerioth Soto (MEX)
Parallel bars	Camilo Vera (COL)	Fred Richard (USA)	Ángel Barajas (COL)
Horizontal bar	Ángel Barajas (COL)	Toby Liang (USA)	Cristóbal Cuevas (CHI)
Women
Team all-around	United States; Dulcy Caylor; Zoey Molomo; Audrey Snyder; Tiana Sumanasekera; Alicia Zhou	Canada; Cristella Brunetti-Burns; Victoriane Charron; Tegan Shaver; Evandra Zlobec	Argentina; Isabella Ajalla; Mia Corrente; Nicole Iribarne; Mia Mainardi
Individual all-around	Dulcy Caylor (USA)	Tiana Sumanasekera (USA)	Isabella Ajalla (ARG)
Vault	Tiana Sumanasekera (USA)	Dulcy Caylor (USA)	Darielis Aviles (PUR)
Uneven bars	Alicia Zhou (USA)	Evandra Zlobec (CAN)	Isabella Ajalla (ARG)
Balance beam	Tiana Sumanasekera (USA)	Cristella Brunetti-Burns (CAN)	Dulcy Caylor (USA)
Floor exercise	Tiana Sumanasekera (USA)	Mia Mainardi (ARG)	Isabella Ajalla (ARG)

=== Rhythmic gymnastics ===
==== Senior ====
Event	Gold	Silver	Bronze
Team	United States; Evita Griskenas; Alexandria Kautzman; Erica Foster	Brazil; Geovanna Santos; Ana Luísa Neiva; Maria Flávia Britto; Mariana Vitória Gonçalves	Canada; Carmel Kallemaa; Suzanna Shahbazian; Christina Savchenko; Margaret Kuts
Individual All-around	Evita Griskenas (USA)	Geovanna Santos (BRA)	Carmel Kallemaa (CAN)
Group All-around	Brazil; Maria Eduarda Arakaki; Déborah Medrado; Nicole Pircio; Gabrielle da Silva; Giovanna Oliveira; Bárbara Galvão	Mexico; Dalia Alcocer; Nicole Cejudo; Sofia Flores; Kenya Hernández; Kimberly Salazar; Adirem Tejeda	United States; Maria Bolkhovitinova; Gergana Petkova; Katrine Sakhnov; Karolina Saverino; Hana Starkman; Emily Wilson
Hoop	Marina Malpica (MEX)	Suzanna Shahbazian (CAN)	Sol Martínez (ARG)
Ball	Alexandria Kautzman (USA)	Sol Martínez (ARG)	Suzanna Shahbazian (CAN)
Clubs	Geovanna Santos (BRA)	Alexandria Kautzman (USA)	Carmel Kallemaa (CAN)
Ribbon	Geovanna Santos (BRA)	Sol Martínez (ARG)	Marina Malpica (MEX)
Group 5 Hoops	Brazil; Maria Eduarda Arakaki; Déborah Medrado; Nicole Pircio; Gabrielle da Silva; Giovanna Oliveira; Bárbara Galvão	Mexico; Dalia Alcocer; Nicole Cejudo; Sofia Flores; Kenya Hernández; Kimberly Salazar; Adirem Tejeda	United States; Maria Bolkhovitinova; Gergana Petkova; Katrine Sakhnov; Karolina Saverino; Hana Starkman; Emily Wilson
Group 3 Ribbons + 2 Balls	Mexico; Dalia Alcocer; Nicole Cejudo; Sofia Flores; Kenya Hernández; Kimberly Salazar; Adirem Tejeda	Brazil; Maria Eduarda Arakaki; Déborah Medrado; Nicole Pircio; Gabrielle da Silva; Giovanna Oliveira; Bárbara Galvão	United States; Maria Bolkhovitinova; Gergana Petkova; Katrine Sakhnov; Karolina Saverino; Hana Starkman; Emily Wilson

==== Junior ====
Event	Gold	Silver	Bronze
Team	United States; Rin Keys; Jaelyn Chin; Megan Chu; Ksenia Pototski	Brazil; Maria Eduarda Alexandre; Isadora Oliveira; Keila Santos; Emanuelle Felberk	Mexico; Sofia Pérez; Crista Hernández; Sofia García; Lili de León
Individual All-around	Rin Keys (USA)	Maria Eduarda Alexandre (BRA)	Jaelyn Chin (USA)
Group All-around	Brazil; Isadora Beduschi; Laura Gamboa; Fernanda Heinemann; Yumi Rodrigues; Lavinia Silvério	Mexico; Lili de León; Pamela Burguete; Idalia Lecuona; Annette Luna; Naomi Osorio; Ivanna Rodriguez	United States; Goda Balsys; Annabella Hantov; Isabelle Novoseltsky; Kristina Lee; Kalina Trayanov
Hoop	Megan Chu (USA)	Rin Keys (USA)	Maria Eduarda Alexandre (BRA)
Ball	Rin Keys (USA)	Jaelyn Chin (USA)	Maria Eduarda Alexandre (BRA)
Clubs	Maria Eduarda Alexandre (BRA)	Jaelyn Chin (USA)	Megan Chu (USA)
Ribbon	Rin Keys (USA)	Maria Eduarda Alexandre (BRA)	Isadora Oliveira (BRA)
Group 5 Ropes	Brazil; Isadora Beduschi; Laura Gamboa; Fernanda Heinemann; Yumi Rodrigues; Lavinia Silvério	Mexico; Lili de León; Pamela Burguete; Idalia Lecuona; Annette Luna; Naomi Osorio; Ivanna Rodriguez	United States; Goda Balsys; Annabella Hantov; Isabelle Novoseltsky; Kristina Lee; Kalina Trayanov
Group 5 Balls	Brazil; Isadora Beduschi; Laura Gamboa; Fernanda Heinemann; Yumi Rodrigues; Lavinia Silvério	Mexico; Lili de León; Pamela Burguete; Idalia Lecuona; Annette Luna; Naomi Osorio; Ivanna Rodriguez	United States; Goda Balsys; Annabella Hantov; Isabelle Novoseltsky; Kristina Lee; Kalina Trayanov

=== Trampoline gymnastics ===
==== Senior ====
Event	Gold	Silver	Bronze
Men
Trampoline team	Colombia; Ángel Hernández; Alvaro Calero; Manuel Sierra; Santiago Parra	Mexico; José Hugo Marín; Adrian Martínez; Amado Lozano; Esaul Ceballos	Argentina; Federico Cury; Santiago Ferrari; Tobias Weise; Ralph Stotz
Individual trampoline	Ángel Hernández (COL)	Keegan Soehn (CAN)	Federico Cury (ARG)
Synchronised trampoline	Alvaro Calero (COL); Ángel Hernández (COL)	Nathan Shuh (CAN); Keegan Soehn (CAN)	José Hugo Marín (MEX); Adrian Martínez (MEX)
Double mini trampoline	Trevor Harder (USA)	Federico Cury (ARG)	João Guilherme Silva (BRA)
Women
Trampoline team	Mexico; Dafne Navarro; Patricia Nuñez; Michelle Mares; Aylin Cobos	Brazil; Camilla Gomes; Alice Gomes; Maria Luiza Oliveira; Ana Luiza Soares	Argentina; Valentina Podesta; Lucila Maldonado; Florencia Braun; Candela Sacca
Individual trampoline	Camilla Gomes (BRA)	Alice Gomes (BRA)	Dafne Navarro (MEX)
Synchronised trampoline	Alice Gomes (BRA); Camilla Gomes (BRA)	Dafne Navarro (MEX); Michelle Mares (MEX)	Florencia Braun (ARG); Lucila Maldonado (ARG)

==== Junior ====
Event	Gold	Silver	Bronze
Men
Individual trampoline	Tomas Roberti (ARG)	Arthur Ferreira (BRA)	Marcos Pedro (BRA)
Women
Individual trampoline	Gabriela Rodrigues (BRA)	Alice Albuquerque (BRA)	Alma Figueiredo (ARG)

== Medal table ==
=== Overall ===
* Host nation (Brazil)

Rank	Nation	Gold	Silver	Bronze	Total
1	United States	26	14	16	56
2	Brazil*	18	15	8	41
3	Colombia	6	3	3	12
4	Mexico	3	8	6	17
5	Argentina	1	4	11	16
6	Panama	1	0	0	1
7	Canada	0	10	9	19
8	Costa Rica	0	1	0	1
9	Chile	0	0	1	1
9	Puerto Rico	0	0	1	1
Totals (10 entries)		55	55	55	165

=== Artistic ===
* Host nation (Brazil)

Rank	Nation	Gold	Silver	Bronze	Total
1	United States	17	10	8	35
2	Brazil*	7	5	3	15
3	Colombia	3	3	3	9
4	Panama	1	0	0	1
5	Canada	0	7	5	12
6	Argentina	0	1	5	6
7	Mexico	0	1	2	3
8	Costa Rica	0	1	0	1
9	Chile	0	0	1	1
9	Puerto Rico	0	0	1	1
Totals (10 entries)		28	28	28	84

==== Men ====
* Host nation (Brazil)

Rank	Nation	Gold	Silver	Bronze	Total
1	United States	10	5	4	19
2	Brazil*	3	3	3	9
2	Colombia	3	3	3	9
4	Canada	0	4	3	7
5	Costa Rica	0	1	0	1
6	Argentina	0	0	1	1
6	Chile	0	0	1	1
6	Mexico	0	0	1	1
Totals (8 entries)		16	16	16	48

==== Women ====
* Host nation (Brazil)

Rank	Nation	Gold	Silver	Bronze	Total
1	United States	7	5	4	16
2	Brazil*	4	2	0	6
3	Panama	1	0	0	1
4	Canada	0	3	2	5
5	Argentina	0	1	4	5
6	Mexico	0	1	1	2
7	Puerto Rico	0	0	1	1
Totals (7 entries)		12	12	12	36

=== Rhythmic ===
* Host nation (Brazil)

Rank	Nation	Gold	Silver	Bronze	Total
1	Brazil*	8	6	3	17
2	United States	8	4	8	20
3	Mexico	2	5	2	9
4	Argentina	0	2	1	3
5	Canada	0	1	4	5
Totals (5 entries)		18	18	18	54

=== Trampoline ===
* Host nation (Brazil)

Rank	Nation	Gold	Silver	Bronze	Total
1	Brazil*	3	4	2	9
2	Colombia	3	0	0	3
3	Mexico	1	2	2	5
4	Argentina	1	1	5	7
5	United States	1	0	0	1
6	Canada	0	2	0	2
Totals (6 entries)		9	9	9	27

== World Championships qualification ==
=== Artistic ===
This event served as qualification for the 2022 World Championships in Liverpool. The top four men's teams and top five women's teams during the qualification round qualified a team to the World Championships. For the men this was the United States, Brazil, Canada and Colombia; for the women this was Brazil, the United States, Canada, Argentina, and Mexico.

The top 6 men and top 11 women not part of a qualified team qualified as an individual to the World Championships (max two athletes per gender per country). For the men the individual qualifiers were Santiago Mayol (Argentina), Edward Gonzales (Peru), Jose Lopez (Puerto Rico), Isaac Nuñez (Mexico), Leandro Peña (Dominican Republic), and Joel Álvarez (Chile). The women who qualified were Tyesha Mattis (Jamaica), Valentina Pardo (Colombia), Ana Karina Mendez (Peru), Antonia Marihuan (Chile), Ginna Escobar (Colombia), Milca Leon (Venezuela), Franchesca Santi (Chile), Alais Perea (Ecuador), Annalise Newman-Achee (Trinidad and Tobago), Franciny Morales (Costa Rica), and Karla Navas (Panama).
