= Gymnastics at the 2023 Pan American Games – Men's parallel bars =

Men's parallel bars at the 2023 Pan American Games
- Venue: Training Center for Collective Sport
- Dates: October 25
- Competitors: 8 from 5 nations
- Winning score: 15.400

Medalists
Gold medal	Curran Phillips	United States
Silver medal	Colt Walker	United States
Bronze medal	Isaac Núñez	Mexico

The men's parallel bars gymnastic event at the 2023 Pan American Games was held on October 25 at the Training Center for Collective Sport.

== Results ==
=== Final ===
Rank	Gymnast	D Score	E Score	Pen.	Total
1st place, gold medalist(s)	Curran Phillips (USA)	6.8	8.600		15.400
2nd place, silver medalist(s)	Colt Walker (USA)	6.0	8.366		14.366
3rd place, bronze medalist(s)	Isaac Núñez (MEX)	5.9	7.933		13.833
4	Bernardo Miranda (BRA)	5.1	8.466		13.566
5	Zachary Clay (CAN)	5.5	8.066		13.566
6	William Émard (CAN)	5.5	7.766		13.266
7	Diorges Escobar (CUB)	5.6	7.133		12.733
8	Diogo Soares (BRA)	5.7	6.866		12.566

=== Qualification ===
Rank	Gymnast	D Score	E Score	Pen.	Total	Qual.
1	(United States) Curran Phillips	6.800	7.666		14.466	Q
2	(United States) Colt Walker	6.000	8.366		14.366	Q
3	(Cuba) Diorges Escobar	5.900	8.266		14.166	Q
4	(Brazil) Bernardo Miranda	5.600	8.533		14.133	Q
5	(Brazil) Diogo Soares	5.600	8.500		14.100	Q
6	(Mexico) Isaac Núñez	5.900	8.133		14.033	Q
7	(Canada) William Émard	5.500	8.366		13.866	Q
8	(Canada) Zachary Clay	5.200	8.633		13.833	Q
9	(United States) Donnell Whittenburg	5.800	8.033		13.833	–
10	(Brazil) Yuri Guimarães	5.200	8.566		13.766	–
11	(Cuba) José Carlos Escandón	5.700	8.033		13.733	R1
12	(Brazil) Arthur Mariano	5.100	8.533		13.633	–
13	(Puerto Rico) Andres Josue Perez Ginez	5.500	8.133		13.633	R2
14	(Colombia) Dilan Jiménez	5.900	7.733		13.633	R3
