= Natalia Escalera =

Mexican artistic gymnast

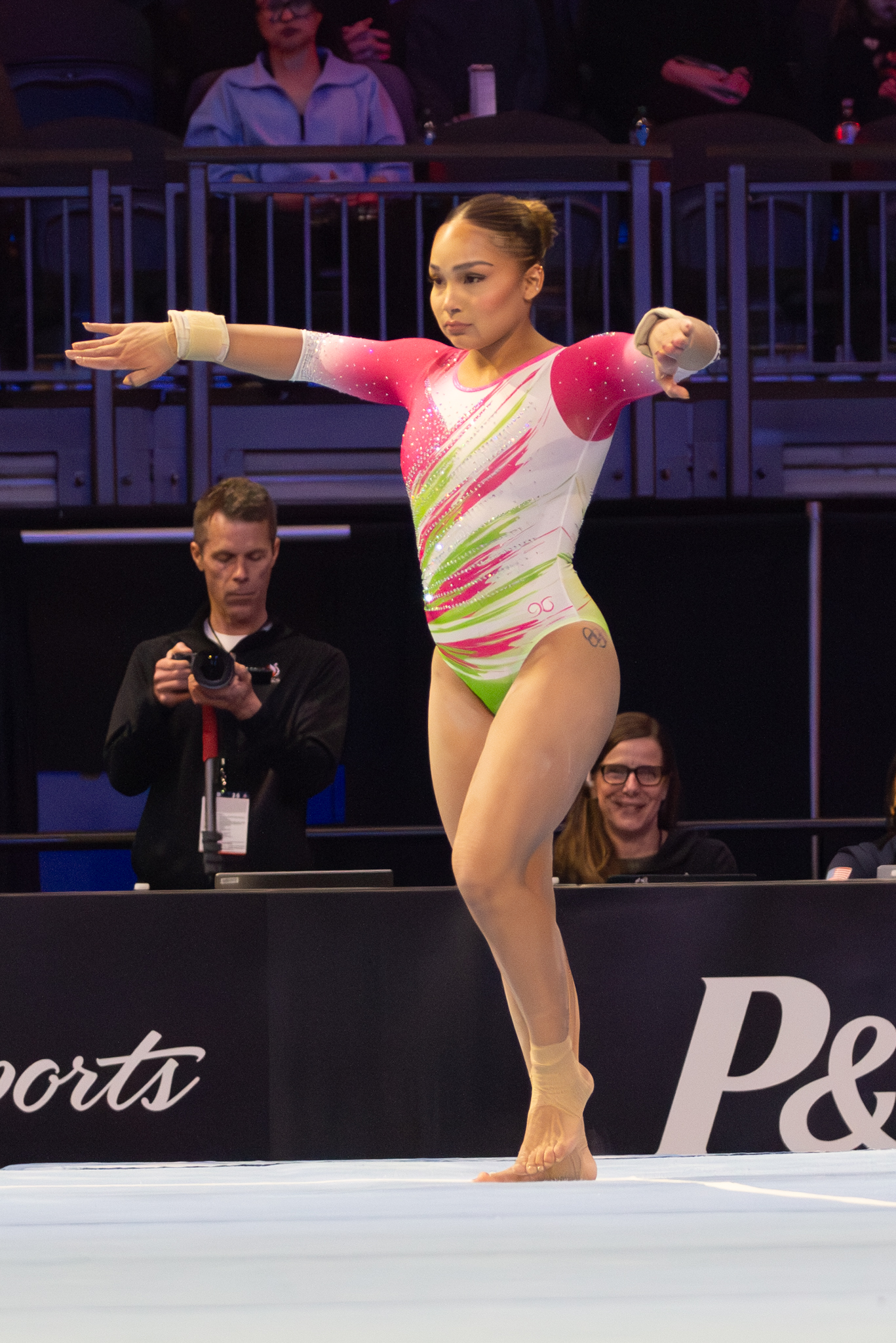
- Escalera at the 2026 American Cup

Personal information
- Full name: Natalia Isabel Escalera Cárdenas
- Born: 3 July 2002 (age 24) Ensenada, Baja California, Mexico

Gymnastics career
- Country represented: Mexico (2017–present)
- Club: Baja Dynamo
- Head coach: Pavel Oceguera
Medal record
Women's artistic gymnastics
Representing Mexico
Pan American Games
Bronze medal – third place	2023 Santiago	Vault
Pan American Championships
Gold medal – first place	2021 Rio de Janeiro	Vault
Silver medal – second place	2021 Rio de Janeiro	Team
Silver medal – second place	2022 Rio de Janeiro	Vault
Silver medal – second place	2023 Medellín	Team
Silver medal – second place	2023 Medellín	All-around
Bronze medal – third place	2018 Lima	Team
Bronze medal – third place	2023 Medellín	Vault
Bronze medal – third place	2023 Medellín	Uneven bars
Bronze medal – third place	2023 Medellín	Floor exercise
Central American and Caribbean Games
Gold medal – first place	2023 San Salvador	Team
Gold medal – first place	2026 Santo Domingo	Team
Gold medal – first place	2026 Santo Domingo	All-around
Gold medal – first place	2026 Santo Domingo	Vault
Silver medal – second place	2023 San Salvador	Floor exercise
Silver medal – second place	2026 Santo Domingo	Balance beam

Natalia Isabel Escalera Cárdenas (born 3 July 2002) is a Mexican artistic gymnast. She is the 2021 Pan American champion and the 2023 Pan American Games bronze medalist on the vault. She represented Mexico at the 2024 Summer Olympics.

== Early life ==
Escalera was born in Ensenada in 2002 and began gymnastics when she was three years old at Baja Dynamo, where she still trains.

== Gymnastics career ==
=== 2017 ===
At the 2017 Mexican Championships, Escalera finished third in the all-around in the junior division. Then at the Central American Sports Festival, she finished seventh in the all-around and won a silver medal on the vault.

=== 2018–2019 ===
Escalera became age-eligible for senior competition in 2018. She finished sixth at her first senior-level national championships. She was selected to represent Mexico at the 2018 Pan American Championships where she helped the team win the bronze medal.

At the 2019 Mexican Championships, Escalera placed twelfth in the all-around.

=== 2021 ===
At the 2021 Pan American Championships, Escalera finished fifth in the all-around and was less than 0.400 points away from winning a continental quota for the Olympic Games. She helped Mexico place second and qualified for three event finals, originally finishing second on vault behind Martina Dominici, fifth on uneven bars, and fifth on floor exercise. However, Dominici tested positive for a banned substance; as a result, her results were overturned, and Escalera was awarded the gold medal on vault. At the World Championships, she qualified for the vault final and placed seventh.

=== 2022 ===
Escalera began the 2022 season by winning the all-around silver medal behind Ahtziri Sandoval at the Mexican Championships. She then competed at the Pan American Championships where she helped Mexico place fourth as a team and qualify for the upcoming World Championships. Individually, she won a silver medal on the vault behind Karla Navas of Panama. At the Szombathely World Challenge Cup, she finished fourth on the uneven bars and fifth on the vault and floor exercise. She finished 32nd in the all-around during the qualification round of the World Championships, making her the third reserve for the all-around final.

=== 2023 ===
Escalera began the season by winning her first national all-around title. She then competed at the Pan American Championships where she won silver in the all-around behind Tiana Sumanasekera and also won three bronze medals on the vault, uneven bars, and floor exercise. Additionally, she helped the Mexican team win the silver medal behind the United States and secure qualification for the upcoming World Championships and Pan American Games. She then helped the Mexican team win the gold medal at the Central American & Caribbean Games. Individually, she won the silver medal on the floor exercise behind teammate Alexa Moreno.

At the 2023 World Championships, Escalera helped Mexico finish 14th in the qualification round. Although they did not qualify as a full team to the upcoming Olympic Games, they did earn Mexico a non-nominative berth. Escalera ended the year competing at the 2023 Pan American Games where she won bronze on vault behind Rebeca Andrade and Jordan Chiles.

=== 2024 ===
Escalera started the year competing at the Cottbus World Cup and placed fifth on vault and seventh on uneven bars. She also finished fifth on the vault at the Baku World Cup. In March, the Mexican Gymnastics Federation officially awarded Escalera the non-nominative Olympic berth they earned at the previous year's World Championships. She placed 52nd on uneven bars at the 2024 Summer Olympics in Paris.

=== 2025 ===
Escalera represented Mexico at the 2025 World Championships, competing on all four events. After qualifying in 23rd, she ultimately finished 17th in the all-around final.

=== 2026 ===
At the 2026 American Cup, Escalera competed as a part of the Mexican team, alongside teammates Paulina Guerra, Isaac Núñez, and Rodrigo Gomez. She contributed scores on uneven bars and floor exercise to Mexico's sixth-place finish.

In May, Escalera competed on vault, uneven bars, and balance beam at the Mexican Championships. Her best result was on uneven bars, where she won the silver medal behind Paulina Campos.

Escalera was named to the Mexican team for the 2026 Central American and Caribbean Games with teammates Campos, Paulina Guerra, Dominica Escartín, and Victoria Mata. They won the gold medal in the team competition. Individually, Escalera won the gold medal in the all-around, as well as gold on vault and a silver medal on balance beam.

== Competitive history ==
Competitive history of Natalia Escalera
Year	Event	Team	AA	VT	UB	BB	FX
2017	Junior Mexican Championships		3rd place, bronze medalist(s)				
2017	Junior Central American Sports Festival		7	2nd place, silver medalist(s)			
2018	Mexican Championships		6				
2018	Pan American Championships	3rd place, bronze medalist(s)					
2019	Mexican Championships		12				
2021
2021	Pan American Championships	2nd place, silver medalist(s)		1st place, gold medalist(s)	4		4
2021	World Championships			7			
2022	Mexican Championships		2nd place, silver medalist(s)				
2022	Pan American Championships	4	9	2nd place, silver medalist(s)			
2022	Szombathely World Challenge Cup			5	4		5
2022	World Championships		R3				
2023	Mexican Championships		1st place, gold medalist(s)				
2023	Pan American Championships	2nd place, silver medalist(s)	2nd place, silver medalist(s)	3rd place, bronze medalist(s)	3rd place, bronze medalist(s)		3rd place, bronze medalist(s)
2023	Central American & Caribbean Games	1st place, gold medalist(s)	4		5		2nd place, silver medalist(s)
2023	World Championships	14					
2023	Pan American Games	4	6	3rd place, bronze medalist(s)			
2024	Cottbus World Cup			5	7		
2024	Baku World Cup			5			
2024	Olympic Games				52		
2025
2025	World Championships	—N/a	17				
2026	American Cup	6					
2026	Mexican Championships				2nd place, silver medalist(s)		
2026	Central American and Caribbean Games	1st place, gold medalist(s)	1st place, gold medalist(s)	1st place, gold medalist(s)	4	2nd place, silver medalist(s)	
