= Nicole Cejudo =

Mexican rhythmic gymnast

- Full name: Nicole Cejudo Korkowski
- Born: 10 August 2005 (age 21) Guadalajara, Mexico

Gymnastics career
- Discipline: Rhythmic gymnastics
- Country represented: Mexico (2022-)
Medal record
Representing Mexico
Rhythmic Gymnastics
Event	1st	2nd	3rd
FIG World Cup	1	0	1
Total	1	0	1
Pan American Championships
Gold medal – first place	2022 Rio de Janeiro	3 Ribbons + 2 Balls
Silver medal – second place	2022 Rio de Janeiro	All-Around
Silver medal – second place	2022 Rio de Janeiro	5 Hoops
Silver medal – second place	2023 Guadalajara	Group All-around

Nicole Cejudo (born 10 August 2005) is a Mexican rhythmic gymnast, member of the national senior group.

== Career ==
In 2022 Cejudo was included into the national senior group, debuting at the World Cup in Portimão, being 4th in the All-Around and winning two historical medals, the first in the circuit for the country: bronze with 5 hoops and gold with 3 ribbons and 2 balls. A week later, in Pesaro, they took 7th place in the All-Around and 5th in both event finals. In July she competed at the Pan American Championships in Rio de Janeiro, winning silver in the All-Around and with 5 hoops and gold with 3 ribbons and 2 balls. A month later she was in Cluj-Napoca with the group for the last World Cup of the year, ending 4th in the All-Around and with 5 hoops as well as 6th with 3 ribbons and 2 balls. In September Adirem represented Mexico along Dalia Alcocer, Sofia Flores, Adirem Tejeda and Kimberly Salazar at the World Championships in Sofia, taking 6th place in the All-Around, 6th with 5 hoops and 8th with 3 ribbons and 2 balls.

== Achievements ==
- Part of the first group that was awarded a medal in the World Cup circuit when she won bronze in Portimão in 2022.
- Part of the first group that was awarded a gold medal in the World Cup circuit in Portimão in 2022.
