= Ahtziri Sandoval =

Mexican artistic gymnast

- Full name: Ahtziri Viridiana Sandoval Pérez
- Born: 5 October 1996 (age 30) Guadalajara, Mexico

Gymnastics career
- Country represented: Mexico; (2014–present)
- Club: Jalisco State
- Head coach: Pavel Oceguera
Medal record
Women's artistic gymnastics
Representing Mexico
Pan American Championships
Gold medal – first place	2017 Lima	Vault
Silver medal – second place	2017 Lima	Uneven bars
Silver medal – second place	2023 Medellín	Team
Bronze medal – third place	2014 Mississauga	Team
Bronze medal – third place	2014 Mississauga	Uneven bars
Bronze medal – third place	2022 Rio de Janeiro	Vault
Central American and Caribbean Games
Gold medal – first place	2018 Barranquilla	Uneven bars
Gold medal – first place	2023 San Salvador	Team
Bronze medal – third place	2018 Barranquilla	Team
Bronze medal – third place	2018 Barranquilla	Vault
Bronze medal – third place	2023 San Salvador	Vault
FIG World Cup
Event	1st	2nd	3rd
World Challenge Cup	1	0	0
Total	1	0	0

Ahtziri Viridiana Sandoval Pérez (born 5 October 1996 in Guadalajara) is a Mexican artistic gymnast. She is the 2017 Pan American vault champion and uneven bars silver medalist. She is the 2018 Central American and Caribbean Games uneven bars champion and team and vault bronze medalist. She represented Mexico at the 2024 Summer Olympics.

== Early life ==
Sandoval was born in Guadalajara on 5 October 1996, and she began practicing gymnastics at age five.

== Career ==
=== 2014 ===
Sandoval won the silver medal on the uneven bars and bronze medals on the vault and all-around at the Pan American Sports Festival. She then competed at the Pan American Championships, where she helped Mexico finish third as a team. Individually, she received bronze on the uneven bars behind Americans Ashton Locklear and Madison Kocian. At the World Championships, she helped the Mexican team finish 14th in the qualification round.

=== 2015 ===
Sandoval finished 11th in the all-around at the Mexican Championships. She then competed at the São Paulo Challenge Cup, where she placed sixth on both vault and uneven bars. She finished eighth all-around at the Olimpiada Nacional. In July, she competed at the Pan American Games where she helped Mexico finish fifth as a team. Individually, Sandoval qualified for the uneven bars final and finished sixth. Then at the World Championships, she finished 21st with the Mexican team.

=== 2017 ===
At the 2017 Mexican Championships, Sandoval finished third in the all-around. At the Central American Sports Festival she helped Mexico win gold as a team; individually she won silver on vault behind Yamilet Peña. Then at the Pan American Championships, she won gold on vault and silver on the uneven bars. She then competed at the World Championships on vault, uneven bars, and balance beam, but she did not qualify for any event finals.

=== 2018 ===
Sandoval won the bronze medal on uneven bars at the Mexican Championships. She then competed at the Guimarães Challenge Cup, where she won gold on uneven bars and placed sixth on vault. She next competed at the Central American and Caribbean Games, where she helped Mexico finish third. In the event finals, she won gold on uneven bars and bronze on vault. She withdrew from the World Championships due to torn ligaments and bone damage in her right foot.

=== 2019 ===
Sandoval returned to competition at the Mexican Championships and finished 11th in the all-around. She missed the rest of the season, including the Pan American Games, due to a toe injury that required surgery.

=== 2020 ===
Sandoval competed at the Melbourne World Cup, where she placed seventh on vault. She next competed at the Baku World Cup, placing sixth on vault during qualifications; however, event finals were canceled due to the COVID-19 pandemic in Azerbaijan.

=== 2022 ===
Sandoval returned to competition in 2022 as the captain of Mexico's national team. She placed first all-around at the Mexican Championships. She next competed at the 2022 Pan American Championships, where she helped Mexico place fourth as a team and qualify for the upcoming World Championships. Individually, she won bronze on vault behind Karla Navas of Panama and compatriot Natalia Escalera. She competed at the World Championships, helping the Mexican team finish 15th.

=== 2023 ===
Sandoval won the bronze medal in the all-around at the Mexican Championships. She competed at the 2023 Pan American Championships, where she helped Mexico win silver behind the United States. She next competed at the Central American and Caribbean Games where she helped Mexico win gold. Individually, she won the bronze medal on the vault. At the Paris World Challenge Cup, she finished fourth on vault and eighth on uneven bars.

At the 2023 World Championships Sandoval helped Mexico finish fourteenth in qualifications. Although Sandoval did not qualify for any individual finals, she earned a nominative berth to compete at the 2024 Olympic Games due to being the highest-placed eligible gymnast on the uneven bars. After the World Championships, she competed at the Pan American Games where the Mexican team placed fourth. In the event finals, she finished fourth on both vault and uneven bars.

=== 2024 ===
At the 2024 Olympic Games Sandoval finished fifty-fourth during qualifications and did not advance to any finals.

== Competitive history ==
Competitive history of Ahtziri Sandoval
Year	Event	Team	AA	VT	UB	BB	FX
2014	Pan American Sports Festival		3rd place, bronze medalist(s)	3rd place, bronze medalist(s)	1st place, gold medalist(s)		
2014	Pan American Championships	3rd place, bronze medalist(s)			3rd place, bronze medalist(s)		
2014	World Championships	14					
2015	Mexican Championships		11				
2015	São Paulo World Challenge Cup			6	6		
2015	Olimpiada Nacional		8				
2015	Pan American Games	5			6		
2015	World Championships	21					
2017	Mexican Championships		3rd place, bronze medalist(s)				
2017	Central American Sports Festival	1st place, gold medalist(s)		2nd place, silver medalist(s)			
2017	Pan American Championships			1st place, gold medalist(s)	2nd place, silver medalist(s)		
2017	World Championships			22	35	100	
2018	Mexican Championships				3rd place, bronze medalist(s)		
2018	Guimarães World Challenge Cup			6	1st place, gold medalist(s)		
2018	Central American & Caribbean Games	3rd place, bronze medalist(s)		3rd place, bronze medalist(s)	1st place, gold medalist(s)		
2019	Mexican Championships		11				
2020	Melbourne World Cup			6			
2020	Baku World Cup			6			
2022	Mexican Championships		1st place, gold medalist(s)				
2022	Pan American Championships	4	9	2nd place, silver medalist(s)			
2022	World Championships	15					
2023	Mexican Championships		3rd place, bronze medalist(s)				
2023	Pan American Championships	2nd place, silver medalist(s)					
2023	Central American & Caribbean Games	1st place, gold medalist(s)		3rd place, bronze medalist(s)			
2023	Paris World Challenge Cup			4	8		
2023	World Championships	14					
2023	Pan American Games	4	9	4	4		
2024
2024	Olympic Games		54				
