= Isaac Núñez =

Mexican artistic gymnast (born 1999)

- Full name: Isaac Núñez Farfan
- Born: 29 December 1999 (age 26)

Gymnastics career
- Discipline: Men's artistic gymnastics
- Country represented: Mexico
Medal record
Pan American Games
Gold medal – first place	2019 Lima	Parallel bars
Bronze medal – third place	2023 Santiago	Parallel bars
Central American and Caribbean Games
Gold medal – first place	2023 San Salvador	Team
Gold medal – first place	2023 San Salvador	Pommel Horse
Gold medal – first place	2023 San Salvador	Parallel Bars
Bronze medal – third place	2018 Barranquilla	Team
Bronze medal – third place	2026 Santo Domingo	Team

Isaac Núñez Farfan (Note: In this Spanish name, the first or paternal surname is Núñez and the second or maternal family name is Farfan.) (born 29 December 1999) is a Mexican artistic gymnast.

In 2019, he represented Mexico at the 2019 Pan American Games held in Lima, Peru and he won the gold medal in the men's parallel bars event.
