= Sofía Flores =

Mexican rhythmic gymnast

- Full name: Ana Sofía Flores Valdez
- Born: 20 December 2004 (age 21) Coahuila, Mexico

Gymnastics career
- Discipline: Rhythmic gymnastics
- Country represented: Mexico; (2022–2025)
- Retired: yes
Medal record
Rhythmic Gymnastics
Representing Mexico
Event	1st	2nd	3rd
FIG World Cup	1	0	1
Pan American Championships	3	7	1
Pan American Games	0	3	0
Central American and Caribbean Games	3	0	0
Total	7	10	2
Pan American Championships
Gold medal – first place	2022 Rio de Janeiro	Group 3 ribbons + 2 balls
Gold medal – first place	2024 Guatemala City	Group all-around
Gold medal – first place	2024 Guatemala City	Group 3 ribbons + 2 balls
Silver medal – second place	2022 Rio de Janeiro	Group all-around
Silver medal – second place	2022 Rio de Janeiro	Group 5 hoops
Silver medal – second place	2023 Guadalajara	Group all-around
Silver medal – second place	2023 Guadalajara	Group 3 ribbons + 2 balls
Silver medal – second place	2023 Guadalajara	Group 5 hoops
Silver medal – second place	2024 Guatemala City	Group 5 hoops
Silver medal – second place	2025 Asunción	Group 5 hoops
Bronze medal – third place	2025 Asunción	Group 3 ribbons + 2 balls
Pan American Games
Silver medal – second place	2023 Santiago	Group all-around
Silver medal – second place	2023 Santiago	Group 5 hoops
Silver medal – second place	2023 Santiago	Group 3 ribbons + 2 balls
Central American and Caribbean Games
Gold medal – first place	2023 San Salvador	Group all-around
Gold medal – first place	2023 San Salvador	Group 5 hoops
Gold medal – first place	2023 San Salvador	Group 3 ribbons + 2 balls

Ana Sofía Flores Valdez (Note: In this Spanish name, the first or paternal surname is Flores and the second or maternal family name is Valdez.) (born 20 December 2004) is a retired Mexican rhythmic gymnast. She was a member of the national senior group.

== Career ==
In 2022, Flores was included into the national senior group, debuting at the World Cup in Portimão, being 4th in the All-Around and winning two historical medals, the first in the circuit for the country: bronze with 5 hoops and gold with 3 ribbons and 2 balls. A week later, in Pesaro, they took 7th place in the All-Around and 5th in both event finals. In July she competed at the Pan American Championships in Rio de Janeiro, winning silver in the All-Around and with 5 hoops and gold with 3 ribbons and 2 balls. A month later she was in Cluj-Napoca with the group for the last World Cup of the year, ending 4th in the All-Around and with 5 hoops as well as 6th with 3 ribbons and 2 balls. In September, she represented Mexico along Dalia Alcocer, Nicole Cejudo, Adirem Tejeda and Kimberly Salazar at the World Championships in Sofia, taking 6th place in the All-Around, 6th with 5 hoops and 8th with 3 ribbons and 2 balls.

== Achievements ==
- Part of the first Mexican group that was awarded a medal in the World Cup circuit when she won bronze in Portimão in 2022.
- Part of the first Mexican group that was awarded a gold medal in the World Cup circuit in Portimão in 2022.
