= Dalia Alcocer =

Mexican rhythmic gymnast

- Full name: Dalia de Jesús Alcocer Piña
- Born: 2 January 2004 (age 22) Mérida, Mexico

Gymnastics career
- Discipline: Rhythmic gymnastics
- Country represented: Mexico; (2019-)
Medal record
Rhythmic Gymnastics
Representing Mexico
Event	1st	2nd	3rd
Pan American Championships	1	2	3
Central American and Caribbean Games	4	0	0
FIG World Cup	1	0	1
Total	6	2	4
Pan American Games
Silver medal – second place	2023 Santiago	Group all-Around
Silver medal – second place	2023 Santiago	5 Hoops
Silver medal – second place	2023 Santiago	3 Ribbons + 2 Balls
Pan American Championships
Gold medal – first place	2024 Guatemala	All-Around
Gold medal – first place	2024 Guatemala	3 Ribbons + 2 Balls
Gold medal – first place	2022 Rio de Janeiro	3 Ribbons + 2 Balls
Silver medal – second place	2025 Asuncion	5 Ribbons
Silver medal – second place	2024 Guatemala	5 Hoops
Silver medal – second place	2022 Rio de Janeiro	All-Around
Silver medal – second place	2022 Rio de Janeiro	5 Hoops
Bronze medal – third place	2025 Asuncion	3 Balls + 2 Hoops
Bronze medal – third place	2026 Rio de Janeiro	Group All-Around
Bronze medal – third place	2026 Rio de Janeiro	5 Balls
Central American and Caribbean Games
Gold medal – first place	2023 San Salvador	Group All-Around
Gold medal – first place	2023 San Salvador	5 Hoops
Gold medal – first place	2023 San Salvador	3 Ribbons + 2 Balls
Gold medal – first place	2026 Santo Domingo	Group All-Around

Dalia de Jesús Alcocer Piña (Note: In this Spanish name, the first or paternal surname is Alcocer and the second or maternal family name is Piña.) (born 2 January 2004) is a Mexican rhythmic gymnast and a member of the national senior group. She competed at the 2024 Summer Olympics.

== Career ==
Alcocer took up rhythmic gymnastics at age 3. She debuted as a member of the national team in 2019 at the first Junior World Championships in Moscow, competing with ball and taking 41st place in qualification.

In 2022, Alcocer became a member of the national senior group. She debuted at the World Cup in Portimão, where they were 4th in the all-around and won two historical medals, the first on the World Cup circuit for Mexico: bronze with 5 hoops and gold with 3 ribbons and 2 balls. A week later, at the World Cup in Pesaro, they took 7th place in the all-around and 5th in both event finals.

In July, she competed at the Pan American Championships in Rio de Janeiro, winning silver in the all-around and with 5 hoops and gold with 3 ribbons and 2 balls. A month later, she traveled to Cluj-Napoca with the group for the last World Cup of the year, ending 4th in the all-around and with 5 hoops as well as 6th with 3 ribbons and 2 balls.

In September, Alcocer represented Mexico along with her teammates Nicole Cejudo, Sofia Flores, Adirem Tejeda and Kimberly Salazar at the World Championships in Sofia. They took 6th place in the all-around, 6th with 5 hoops and 8th with 3 ribbons and 2 balls.

In June 2023, she helped the group win gold overall and in the two event finals at the Central American and Caribbean Games in San Salvador. In August, she took part in the World Championships in Valencia along with Sofia Flores, Julia Gutierrez, Kimberly Salazar, Adirem Tejeda and Karen Villanueva. There they were 14th in the all-around, 14th with 5 hoops and 8th with 3 ribbons & 2 balls. In September, Alcocer, her teammates and their coach were left stranded in Israel, where they were having a training camp, following the attacks of 7 October. They were able to return home with the help of the government. At the Pan American Games in Santiago, held in November, the group won all three silver medals, thus earning the quota for the following year's Olympics.

In March 2024, at the Aphrodite Cup, they won gold in the all-around, silver with 5 hoops and bronze with 3 ribbons & 2 balls. At the Thiais Grand Prix, the team won silver in the mixed apparatus event. At the World Cup in Sofia, they won bronze with 5 hoops behind Israel and Spain. At their next World Cup in Baku, they were among the top ten groups. At the World Cup in Portimão, they were 4th overall, 4th with 5 hoops and won silver with 3 ribbons & 2 balls.

In June, Alcocer participated in the Pan American Championships in Ciudad de Guatemala, winning gold in the all-around and in the mixed event as well as silver with 5 hoops. At the World Cup in Milan, the group took 5th and 8th place in the finals. In August, she competed along teammates Sofía Flores, Julia Gutiérrez, Kimberly Salazar and Adirem Tejeda, at the Olympic Games in Paris, taking 12th place in the qualifying event.

In 2025, she debuted for the season at the World Cup in Tashkent. The Mexican group was 7th overall, 7th with 5 ribbons and 8th with 3 balls & 2 hoops. At the World Cup in Portimão, she helped the group take 5th place with 5 ribbons.

In May, they competed at the Pan American Championships in Asunción and placed 4th in the all-around. In the event finals, they won bronze with 3 balls & 2 hoops as well as silver with 5 hoops. In July, they competed in the World Cup in Milan, where they were 11th overall, 14th with 5 ribbons and 9th in the mixed apparatus event. In August, Alcocer was selected for the World Championships in Rio de Janeiro, along with Sofia Flores, Julia Gutierrez, Fernanda Salas, Kimberly Salazar and Adirem Tejeda. The group took 11th place in the all-around, 17th with 5 ribbons and 11th with 3 hoop & 2 balls.

In 2026, Alcocer was one of four gymnasts on the national team to lodge a complaint against their coach, Blajaith Aguilar, alleging physical and psychological abuse dating back to 2017, such as being forced to train long hours without a chance to eat. They alleged that reporting the abuse led to them being removed from the national team. CONADE provided the gymnasts with a training location and support. Aguilar denied the allegations.

== Achievements ==
- Part of the first group that was awarded a medal in the World Cup circuit when she won bronze in Portimão in 2022.
- Part of the first group that was awarded a gold medal in the World Cup circuit in Portimão in 2022.
