= Kimberly Salazar =

Mexican rhythmic gymnast

- Full name: Kimberly Salazar López
- Born: 24 April 2004 (age 22) Xalapa, Mexico

Gymnastics career
- Discipline: Rhythmic gymnastics
- Country represented: Mexico; (2017-)
Medal record
Rhythmic Gymnastics
Representing Mexico
Event	1st	2nd	3rd
Pan American Games	0	3	0
Pan American Championships	1	3	2
Central American and Caribbean Games	4	0	0
FIG World Cup	1	0	1
Total	6	6	3
Pan American Games
Silver medal – second place	2023 Santiago	Group all-Around
Silver medal – second place	2023 Santiago	5 Hoops
Silver medal – second place	2023 Santiago	3 Ribbons + 2 Balls
Pan American Championships
Gold medal – first place	2022 Rio de Janeiro	3 Ribbons + 2 Balls
Silver medal – second place	2022 Rio de Janeiro	All-Around
Silver medal – second place	2022 Rio de Janeiro	5 Hoops
Silver medal – second place	2023 Guadalajara	Group All-around
Bronze medal – third place	2026 Rio de Janeiro	Group All-Around
Bronze medal – third place	2026 Rio de Janeiro	5 Balls
Central American and Caribbean Games
Gold medal – first place	2023 San Salvador	Group All-Around
Gold medal – first place	2023 San Salvador	5 Hoops
Gold medal – first place	2023 San Salvador	3 Ribbons + 2 Balls
Gold medal – first place	2026 Santo Domingo	Group All-Around

Kimberly Salazar López (Note: In this Spanish name, the first or paternal surname is Salazar and the second or maternal family name is López.) (born 24 April 2004) is a Mexican rhythmic gymnast and a member of the national senior group. She competed at the 2024 Summer Olympics.

== Personal life ==
Salazar took up the sport at age 7. She practised athletics, but after watching some girls and seeing how flexible they were, she enrolled in rhythmic gymnastics. She says the most influential people in her career are her parents and her coaches.

== Career ==
Salazar debuted at the 2017 Junior Pan American Championships, taking 10th place in the all-around, 8th place with hoop, 16th with ball, 13th with clubs and 17th with ribbon. In 2019, she competed at the first Junior World Championships in Moscow, competing with rope and ribbon and placing 52nd and 28th, respectively.

Beginning in 2022 she was included into the national senior group. She debuted at the World Cup in Portimão, where they were 4th in the all-around and won two historical medals, the first on the World Cup circuit for Mexico: bronze with 5 hoops and gold with 3 ribbons and 2 balls. A week later, at the World Cup in Pesaro, they took 7th place in the all-around and 5th in both event finals.

In July, she competed at the Pan American Championships in Rio de Janeiro, winning silver in the all-around and with 5 hoops and gold with 3 ribbons and 2 balls. A month later, she traveled to Cluj-Napoca with the group for the last World Cup of the year, ending 4th in the all-around and with 5 hoops as well as 6th with 3 ribbons and 2 balls.

In September, she represented Mexico along Dalia Alcocer, Nicole Cejudo, Sofia Flores and Adirem Tejeda at the World Championships in Sofia, taking 6th place in the all-around, 6th with 5 hoops and 8th with 3 ribbons and 2 balls.

In 2026, Salazar was one of four gymnasts on the national team to lodge a complaint against their coach, Blajaith Aguilar, alleging physical and psychological abuse dating back to 2017, such as being forced to train long hours without a chance to eat. They alleged that reporting the abuse led to them being removed from the national team. CONADE provided the gymnasts with a training location and support. Aguilar denied the allegations.

== Achievements ==
- Part of the first group that was awarded a medal in the World Cup circuit when she won bronze in Portimão in 2022.
- Part of the first group that was awarded a gold medal in the World Cup circuit in Portimão in 2022.
