= Karla Navas =

Panamanian artistic gymnast

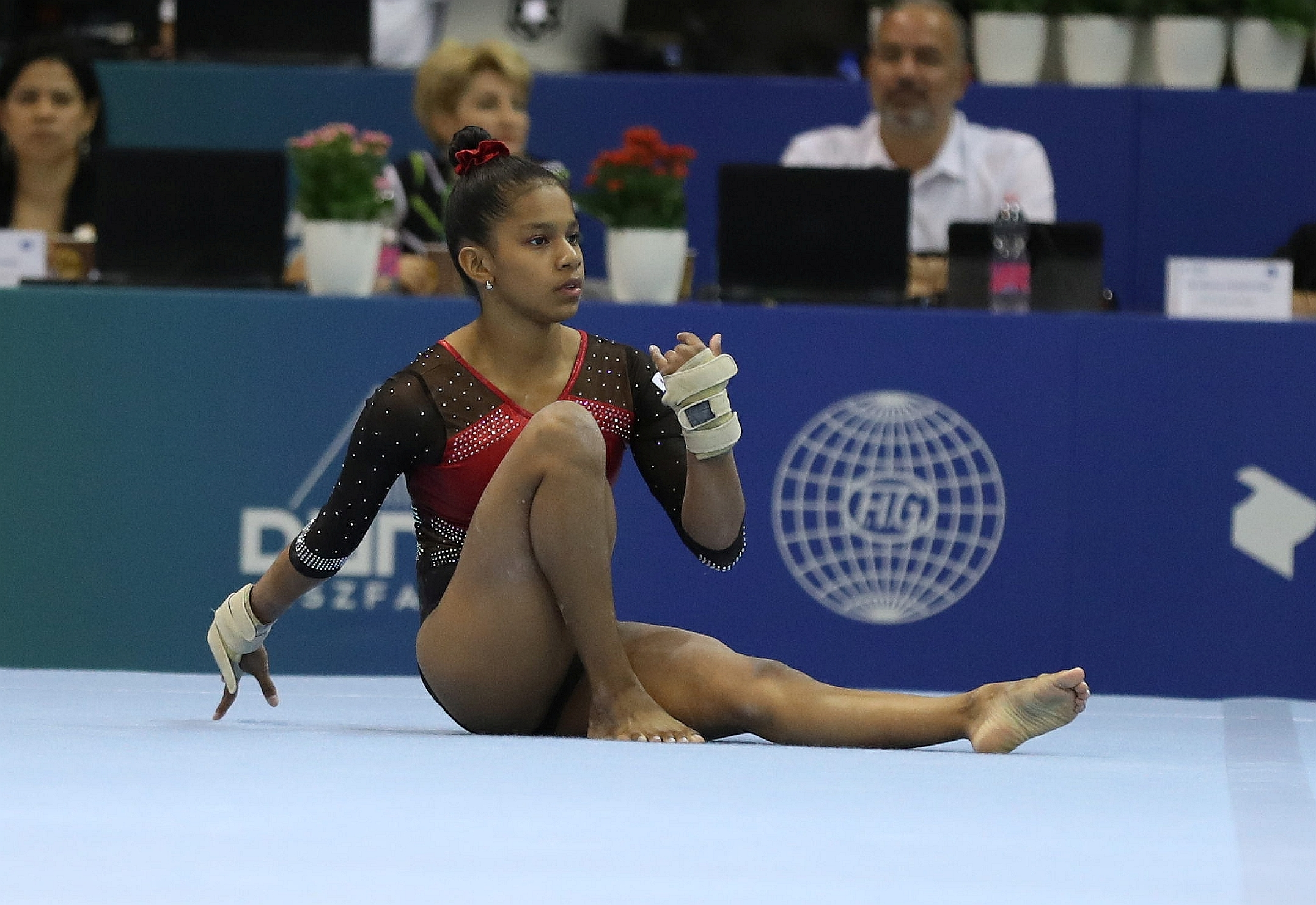
- Navas at the 2019 Junior World Championships

Personal information
- Full name: Karla Andrea Navas Boyd
- Born: 12 September 2004 (age 21) Panama City, Panama

Gymnastics career
- Discipline: Women's artistic gymnastics
- Country represented: Panama (2018–present)
- Club: No Limits
- Head coach: Carlos Rafael Gil
Medal record
Representing Panama
Pan American Championships
Gold medal – first place	2022 Rio de Janeiro	Vault
Gold medal – first place	2024 Santa Marta	Vault
Gold medal – first place	2025 Panama City	Vault
Central American and Caribbean Games
Gold medal – first place	2023 San Salvador	All-around
Silver medal – second place	2023 San Salvador	Team
Silver medal – second place	2023 San Salvador	Uneven bars
Silver medal – second place	2023 San Salvador	Balance beam
Bolivarian Games
Gold medal – first place	2025 Lima-Ayacucho	Team
Gold medal – first place	2025 Lima-Ayacucho	Vault
Silver medal – second place	2022 Valledupar	Vault
Bronze medal – third place	2022 Valledupar	Team
Bronze medal – third place	2022 Valledupar	Balance beam
South American Championships
Gold medal – first place	2024 Aracaju	Vault
Silver medal – second place	2024 Aracaju	Uneven bars
Bronze medal – third place	2024 Aracaju	Team
FIG World Cup
Event	1st	2nd	3rd
Apparatus World Cup	1	0	2
World Challenge Cup	0	0	1
Total	1	0	3

Karla Andrea Navas Boyd (born 12 September 2004) is a Panamanian artistic gymnast. She is the 2022, 2024, and 2025 Pan American champion on vault.

== Early life ==
Navas was born in Panama in 2004. Her mother Veronica Boyd was also a gymnast and her grandfather Guillermo Boyd represented Panama in weightlifting at the 1968 Olympic Games.

== Junior gymnastics career ==
=== 2018 ===
Navas made her international debut at the Pacific Rim Championships where she finished seventh in the all-around. She next competed at the Junior Pan American Championships, where she helped Panama finish seventh as team; Navas finished fifteenth in the all-around. In October Navas competed at the Junior South American Championships where she placed eleventh in the all-around.

=== 2019 ===
Navas was selected to compete at the inaugural Junior World Championships alongside Hillary Heron. Together they finished twenty-third as a team. Individually Navas finished 47th in the all-around. Navas ended the season competing at the Junior South American Championships. She placed sixth in the all-around and helped Panama place third as a team. During event finals she placed first on uneven bars, fourth on vault, and fifth on balance beam.

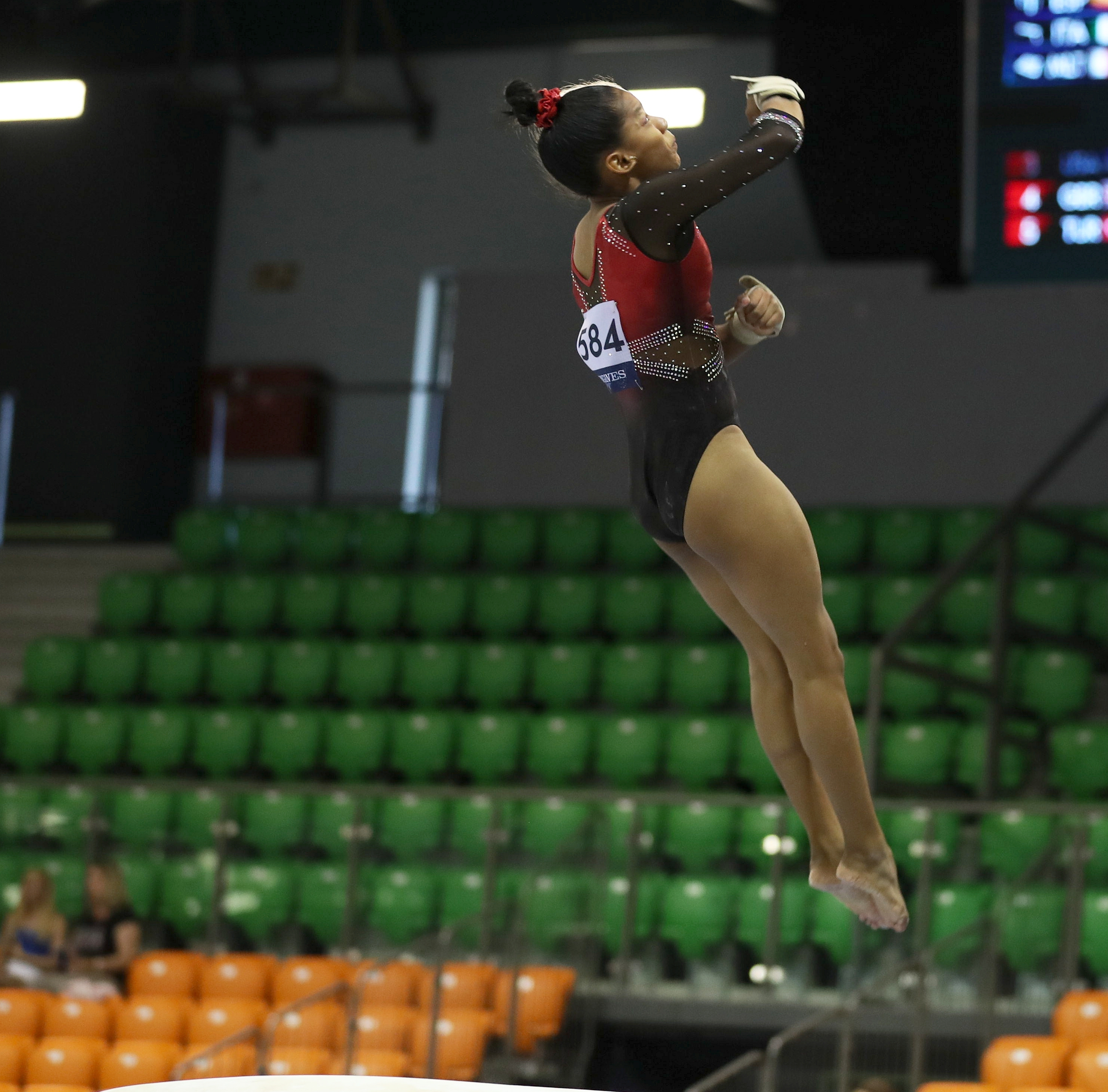
Vault

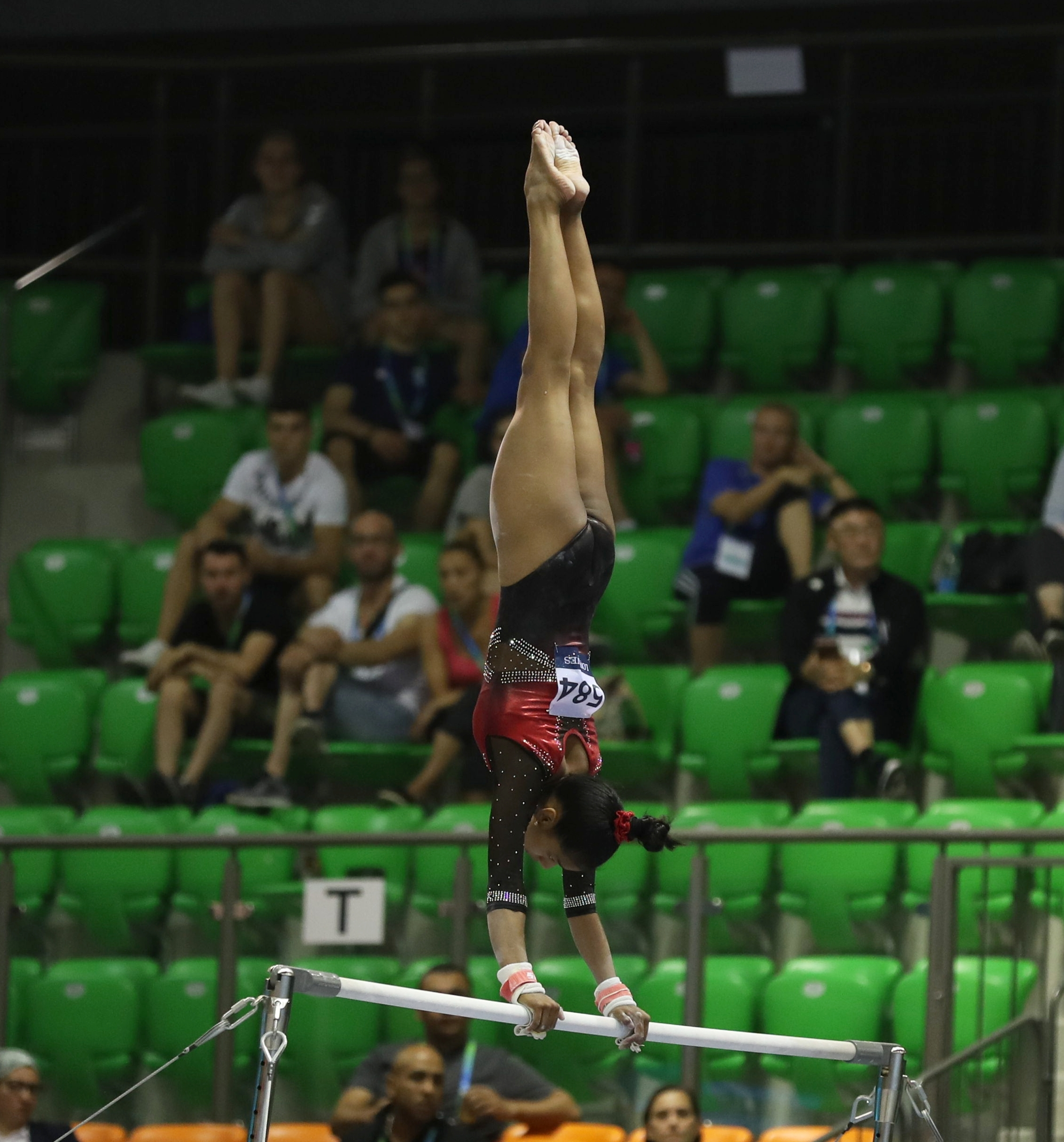
Uneven Bars

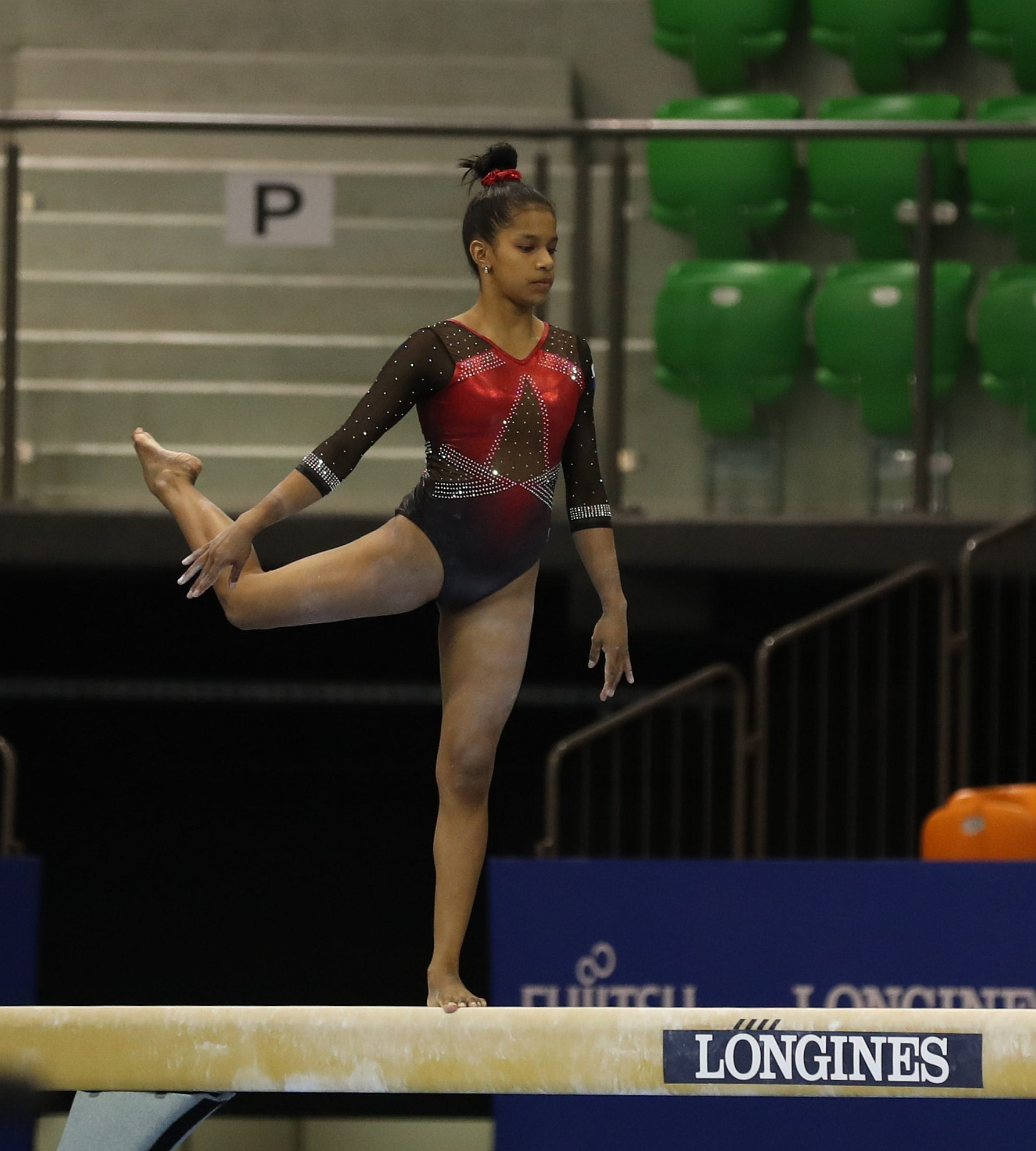
Balance Beam

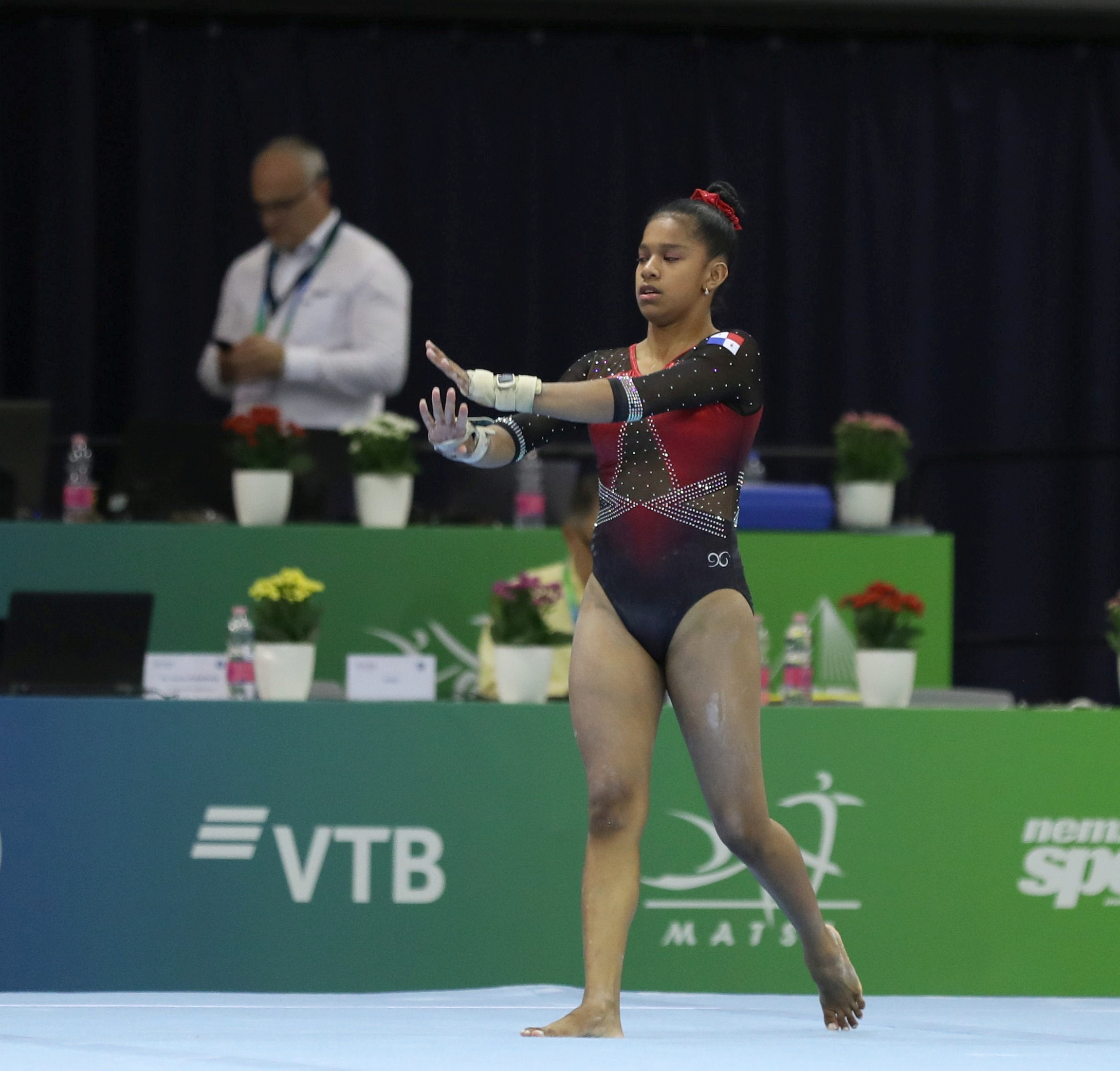
Floor Exercise

Navas at the 2019 Junior World Championships

== Senior gymnastics career ==
=== 2020–21 ===
Navas became age-eligible for senior competition in 2020; however most competitions were canceled or postponed in 2020 due to the global COVID-19 pandemic. Therefore Navas did not compete that year. She returned to competition at the 2021 Pan American Championships where she helped Panama place fourth as a team and individually she placed seventh in the all-around. During event finals she placed fourth on vault and sixth on balance beam.

=== 2022 ===
Navas competed at the Bolivarian Games where she helped Panama finish third as a team. Individually she finished ninth in the all-around. She won silver on vault behind Yamilet Peña and bronze on balance beam. She next competed at the Pan American Championships where she helped Panama finish tenth as a team during qualifications. Individually, she placed twenty-first in the all-around but won gold on vault. Additionally she qualified to compete at the upcoming World Championships as an individual. At the South American Games Navas helped Panama finish fifth as a team. Individually, she placed fifth in the all-around, fourth on the uneven bars and balance beam, and seventh on vault.

== Competitive history ==
Competitive history of Karla Navas at the junior level
Year	Event	Team	AA	VT	UB	BB	FX
2018	Pacific Rim Championships		7				
2018	Pan American Championships	7	15				
2018	South American Championships		11				
2018	Top Gym		26	17			18
2019
2019	Junior World Championships	23	47				
2019	South American Championships	3rd place, bronze medalist(s)	6	4	1st place, gold medalist(s)	5	

Competitive history of Karla Navas at the senior level
Year	Event	Team	AA	VT	UB	BB	FX
2021
2021	Pan American Championships	4	7	4		6	
2022	Bolivarian Games	3rd place, bronze medalist(s)	9	2nd place, silver medalist(s)		3rd place, bronze medalist(s)	
2022	Pan American Championships	10	21	1st place, gold medalist(s)			
2022	South American Games	5	5	7	4	4	
2022	World Championships		77				
2023
2023	Pan American Championships	7	11		10	17	
2023	Central American & Caribbean Games	2nd place, silver medalist(s)	1st place, gold medalist(s)	4	2nd place, silver medalist(s)	2nd place, silver medalist(s)	
2023	World Championships		43				
2023	Pan American Games	7	12				
2024	Cottbus World Cup			3rd place, bronze medalist(s)			
2024	Baku World Cup			3rd place, bronze medalist(s)			
2024	Doha World Cup			1st place, gold medalist(s)			
2024	Pan American Championships	5	6	1st place, gold medalist(s)			
2024	South American Championships	3rd place, bronze medalist(s)	7	1st place, gold medalist(s)	2nd place, silver medalist(s)		4
2025
2025	Pan American Championships	6	9	1st place, gold medalist(s)			4
2025	Paris World Challenge Cup			3rd place, bronze medalist(s)			
2025	World Championships			38			
2025	Bolivarian Games	1st place, gold medalist(s)		1st place, gold medalist(s)			
