= Adirem Tejeda =

Mexican rhythmic gymnast

- Full name: Adirem Tejeda Amaro
- Born: 21 June 2002 (age 24) Yucatan, Mexico

Gymnastics career
- Discipline: Rhythmic gymnastics
- Country represented: Mexico; (2021-)
Medal record
Rhythmic Gymnastics
Representing Mexico
Event	1st	2nd	3rd
Pan American Championships	1	6	2
Central American and Caribbean Games	4	0	0
FIG World Cup	1	0	1
Total	6	6	3
Pan American Games
Silver medal – second place	2023 Santiago	Group all-Around
Silver medal – second place	2023 Santiago	5 Hoops
Silver medal – second place	2023 Santiago	3 Ribbons + 2 Balls
Pan American Championships
Gold medal – first place	2022 Rio de Janeiro	3 Ribbons + 2 Balls
Silver medal – second place	2021 Rio de Janeiro	Group All-around
Silver medal – second place	2021 Rio de Janeiro	5 Balls
Silver medal – second place	2021 Rio de Janeiro	3 Hoops + 4 Clubs
Silver medal – second place	2022 Rio de Janeiro	All-Around
Silver medal – second place	2022 Rio de Janeiro	5 Hoops
Silver medal – second place	2023 Guadalajara	Group All-around
Bronze medal – third place	2026 Rio de Janeiro	Group All-Around
Bronze medal – third place	2026 Rio de Janeiro	5 Balls
Central American and Caribbean Games
Gold medal – first place	2023 San Salvador	Group All-Around
Gold medal – first place	2023 San Salvador	5 Hoops
Gold medal – first place	2023 San Salvador	3 Ribbons + 2 Balls
Gold medal – first place	2026 Santo Domingo	Group All-Around

Adirem Tejeda Amaro (Note: In this Spanish name, the first or paternal surname is Tejeda and the second or maternal family name is Amaro.) (born 21 June 2002) is a Mexican rhythmic gymnast and a member of the national senior group. She competed at the 2024 Summer Olympics.

== Career ==
Tejeda debuted as a member of the senior Mexican group at the 2021 World Cup in Sofia, finishing 7th in the all-around, 4th with 5 balls and 5th with 3 hoops and 4 clubs. At the World Cup in Tashkent, they reached 4th place in the all-around, 6th with 5 balls and 4th with 3 hoops and 4 clubs. In May, she travelled to Pesaro with the group to compete in another World Cup stage. They placed 8th in the all-around, 9th with 5 balls and 3 hoops and 4 clubs. A week later, she competed at the 2021 Pan American Gymnastics Championships in Rio de Janeiro along with her teammates Andrea Garza, Adriana Hernández, Sara Ruíz, and Karen Villanueva. The group won silver behind Brazil in the all-around and both event finals.

In 2022, Adirem and the group participated in the World Cup in Portimão, where they were 4th in the all-around and won two historical medals, the first on the World Cup circuit for Mexico: bronze with 5 hoops and gold with 3 ribbons and 2 balls. A week later, at the next World Cup in Pesaro, they took 7th place in the all-around and 5th in both event finals.

In July, she competed at the Pan American Championships in Rio de Janeiro, where the group won silver in the all-around and with 5 hoops and gold with 3 ribbons and 2 balls. A month later, she went to Cluj-Napoca with the group for the last World Cup of the year, ending 4th in the all-around and with 5 hoops as well as 6th with 3 ribbons and 2 balls. In September, Adirem represented Mexico along with her teammates, Dalia Alcocer, Nicole Cejudo, Sofia Flores and Kimberly Salazar, at the World Championships in Sofia. They took 6th place in the all-around, 6th with 5 hoops and 8th with 3 ribbons and 2 balls.

In 2026, Adirem was one of four gymnasts on the national team to lodge a complaint against their coach, Blajaith Aguilar, alleging physical and psychological abuse dating back to 2017, such as being forced to train long hours without a chance to eat. They alleged that reporting the abuse led to them being removed from the national team. CONADE provided the gymnasts with a training location and support. Aguilar denied the allegations.

== Achievements ==
- Part of the first group that was awarded a medal in the World Cup circuit when she won bronze in Portimão in 2022.
- Part of the first group that was awarded a gold medal in the World Cup circuit in Portimão in 2022.
