= CONADE =

CONADE logo

CONADE is Mexico's National Commission for Physical Culture and Sport (Spanish: Comisión Nacional de Cultura Física y Deporte). It is the arm of the Mexican government charged with fostering and promoting physical education, recreation, and sport. CONADE's headquarters are located in Mexico City.

== Goals ==
CONADE's goals are for the population to: exercise consistently, use free time in a positive way, and practice sports regularly.

CONADE also provides athletes with both support and training in order to ensure that they can dedicate themselves to training.

== SINADE ==
The National System of Physical Culture and Sports (Sistema Nacional de Cultura Física y Deporte) is a collegiate body that represents and governs CONADE. SINADE's purpose is to direct, control and accomplish the goals established by the government and CONADE. They are represented in a Directive Council (Collegiate Body).

== Financing ==
In 2016 the advertising budget increased 1,434%. This is equal to 13% of the total budget. 13% is commonly assigned to the main television companies linked with the Mexican President's political party. The CONADE director Alfredo Castillo Cervantez was also director of the police in Estado de Mexico when Enrique Peña Nieto was governor of that state. Since the early stages as director of CONADE, Castillo has had a strategy of cutting funding and making organizations return some of the money already spent. Despite this, some other federations, such as the Amateur Boxing Federation, had to ask their participants to ask for money on the streets.

== National Olympics ==
CONADE is responsible for organizing the National Olympics, as well as the qualifying events for the National Olympics.
