= 2021 Pan American Gymnastics Championships =

International sports competition

Pan American Gymnastics Championships
- Location: Rio de Janeiro, Brazil
- Date: June 4–13, 2021

The 2021 Pan American Gymnastics Championships was held in Rio de Janeiro, Brazil in June 2021. Three gymnastics disciplines were contested: artistic gymnastics (from June 4–6), rhythmic gymnastics (from June 11–13) and trampoline (from June 11–13). The event was originally to be held in the United States but was changed due to concerns around the COVID-19 pandemic. The event serves as qualification to the 2020 Olympic Games.

== Medalists ==
=== Artistic gymnastics ===
Event	Gold		Silver		Bronze	
Men
Team all-around	Brazil; Francisco Barretto; Tomás Florêncio; Arthur Mariano; Diogo Soares; Caio Souza	251.450	United States; Cameron Bock; Vitaliy Guimaraes; Paul Juda; Riley Loos; Donnell Whittenburg	248.00	Colombia; Kristopher Bohórquez; Jossimar Calvo; José Martínez; Javier Sandoval; José David Toro	241.750
Individual all-around	Caio Souza (BRA)	84.450	Paul Juda (USA)	83.000	Diogo Soares (BRA)	82.700
Floor exercise	Israel Chiriboga (ECU)	13.550	Tomás Florêncio (BRA)	13.100	Julián Jato (ARG)	13.050
Pommel horse	Santiago Mayol (ARG)	13.000	Javier Sandoval (COL)	13.000	Francisco Barretto (BRA)	13.000
Rings	Caio Souza (BRA)	14.700	Federico Molinari (ARG)	14.500	Kristopher Bohórquez (COL)	14.350
Vault	Caio Souza (BRA)	14.575	Fabián de Luna (MEX)	14.175	Daniel Villafañe (ARG)	14.025
Parallel bars	Caio Souza (BRA)	14.900	Javier Sandoval (COL)	14.500	Diogo Soares (BRA)	14.050
Horizontal bar	Javier Sandoval (COL)	13.900	José Martínez (COL)	13.500	Santiago Mayol (ARG)	12.900
Women
Team all-around	Brazil; Rebeca Andrade; Christal Bezerra; Ana Luiza Lima; Lorrane Oliveira; Júlia Soares	160.733	Mexico; Daniela Briceño; Paulina Campos; Natalia Escalera; Victoria Mata; Cinthia Ruiz	152.601	Argentina; Brisa Carraro; Luna Fernández; Abigail Magistrati; Rocio Saucedo	139.066
Individual all-around	Rebeca Andrade (BRA)	56.700	Luciana Alvarado (CRC)	50.833	Lorrane Oliveira (BRA)	50.700
Vault	Natalia Escalera (MEX)	13.433	Hillary Heron (PAN)	13.050	Alaís Perea (ECU)	12.783
Uneven bars	Lorrane Oliveira (BRA)	13.867	Christal Bezerra (BRA)	12.967	Daniela Briceño (MEX)	11.933
Balance beam	Luciana Alvarado (CRC)	13.033	Paulina Campos (MEX)	12.433	Júlia Soares (BRA)	12.333
Floor exercise	Ana Luiza Lima (BRA)	12.967	Christal Bezerra (BRA)	12.767	Abigail Magistrati (ARG)	12.333

Notes
On June 23, 2021, Argentinian gymnast Martina Dominici was provisionally suspended for using a banned substance during the 2021 Pan American Championships. Dominici's scores have been removed from the official results. She had previously won the vault gold medal, all-around and floor exercise silver medals, and the uneven bars bronze medal, along with a bronze medal with the team.

=== Rhythmic gymnastics ===
Event	Gold		Silver		Bronze	
Team	Brazil; Bárbara Domingos; Natália Gaudio; Andressa Jardim	208.550	Mexico; Rut Castillo; Karla Diaz; Ledia Juárez	208.300	United States; Lennox Hopkins-Wilkins; Alexandria Kautzman; Victoria Kobelev	196.400
Individual All-around	Rut Castillo (MEX)	91.500	Bárbara Domingos (BRA)	89.250	Natália Gaudio (BRA)	84.550
Group All-around	Brazil; Maria Eduarda Arakaki; Bárbara Galvão; Déborah Medrado; Geovanna Santos; Gabrielle da Silva; Beatriz Silva	74.400	Mexico; Andrea Garza; Adriana Hernández; Sara Ruíz; Adirem Tejeda; Karen Villanueva	73.700	United States; Isabelle Connor; Camilla Feeley; Nicole Sladkov; Yelyzaveta Merenzon; Lili Mizuno; Elizaveta Pletneva	71.000
Hoop	Karla Diaz (MEX)	21.850	Bárbara Domingos (BRA)	21.250	Lennox Hopkins-Wilkins (USA)	20.950
Ball	Bárbara Domingos (BRA)	23.300	Natália Gaudio (BRA)	23.250	Alexandria Kautzman (USA)	21.250
Clubs	Bárbara Domingos (BRA)	24.000	Sol Fainberg (ARG)	21.050	Karla Diaz (MEX)	20.900
Ribbon	Natália Gaudio (BRA)	20.650	Victoria Kobelev (USA)	19.300	Sol Fainberg (ARG)	19.250
Group 5 Balls	Brazil; Maria Eduarda Arakaki; Bárbara Galvão; Déborah Medrado; Geovanna Santos; Gabrielle da Silva; Beatriz Silva	40.250	Mexico; Andrea Garza; Adriana Hernández; Sara Ruíz; Adirem Tejeda; Karen Villanueva	39.300	United States; Isabelle Connor; Camilla Feeley; Nicole Sladkov; Yelyzaveta Merenzon; Lili Mizuno; Elizaveta Pletneva	36.100
Group 3 Hoops + 4 Clubs	Brazil; Maria Eduarda Arakaki; Bárbara Galvão; Déborah Medrado; Geovanna Santos; Gabrielle da Silva; Beatriz Silva	36.650	Mexico; Andrea Garza; Adriana Hernández; Sara Ruíz; Adirem Tejeda; Karen Villanueva	35.950	United States; Isabelle Connor; Camilla Feeley; Nicole Sladkov; Yelyzaveta Merenzon; Lili Mizuno; Elizaveta Pletneva	33.200

=== Trampoline gymnastics ===
Event	Gold		Silver		Bronze	
Men
Individual trampoline	Ángel Hernández (COL)	57.220	Jeffrey Gluckstein (USA)	56.610	Cody Gesuelli (USA)	56.095
Synchronised trampoline	Cody Gesuelli (USA); Ruben Padilla (USA)	50.415	Bernardo Aquino (ARG); Santiago Ferrari (ARG)	45.540	Alexander Giraldo (COL); Julián Esteban Alvis (COL)	43.400
Individual trampoline (17–21 age group)	Ruben Padilla (USA)	55.695	Zachary Ramacci (USA)	54.050	Adrian Martínez (MEX)	53.960
Women
Individual trampoline	Camilla Gomes (BRA)	52.300	Ingrid Maior (BRA)	51.300	Melissa Flores (MEX)	47.625
Synchronised trampoline	Alice Gomes (BRA); Camilla Gomes (BRA)	45.065	Florencia Braun (ARG); Lucila Maldonado (ARG)	41.465	None awarded	
Individual trampoline (17–21 age group)	Jennifer dos Santos (BRA)	48.710	Mariola García (MEX)	48.085	Lucila Maldonado (ARG)	47.465

== Medal table ==
Rank	Nation	Gold	Silver	Bronze	Total
1	Brazil (BRA)	19	7	6	32
2	Mexico (MEX)	3	8	4	15
3	United States (USA)	2	5	7	14
4	Colombia (COL)	2	3	3	8
5	Argentina (ARG)	1	4	7	12
6	Costa Rica (CRC)	1	1	0	2
7	Ecuador (ECU)	1	0	1	2
8	Panama (PAN)	0	1	0	1
Totals (8 entries)		29	29	28	86

== See also ==
- 2021 Junior Pan American Artistic Gymnastics Championships
- 2021 Junior Pan American Rhythmic Gymnastics Championships
