= Frida Esparza =

Mexican artistic gymnast

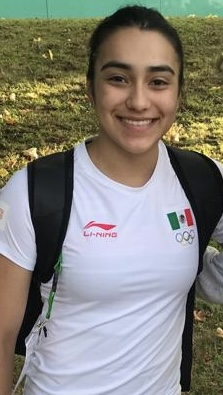
- Esparza in 2019

Personal information
- Born: January 17, 2001 (age 25) Concord, California, U.S.
- Height: 5 ft 4 in (163 cm)

Gymnastics career
- Discipline: Women's artistic gymnastics
- Country represented: Mexico (2018–2020)
- College team: UCLA Bruins
- Club: Head Over Heels
- Head coach: Chris Waller
- Former coach: Katreece Stone
Medal record
Women's artistic gymnastics
Representing Mexico
Event / 1st / 2nd / 3rd; World Challenge Cup / 1 / 0 / 0
Pan American Championships
Bronze medal – third place	2018 Lima	Team
Representing the UCLA Bruins
NCAA Championships
Silver medal – second place	2025 Fort Worth	Team

Frida Esparza (born 17 January 2001) is a Mexican-American artistic gymnast who represented Mexico at the 2018 and 2019 World Championships. Esparza was part of the Mexican team that won the bronze medal at the 2018 Pan American Championships. She is currently a member of the UCLA Bruins women's gymnastics team.

== Personal life ==
Esparza was born in Concord, California to Mexican parents. Her parents enrolled her in gymnastics when she was two years old.

Esparza holds dual citizenship for Mexico and the United States. She competed at the 2016 and 2017 U.S. Championships, but began representing Mexico in 2018.

== Career ==
In 2018, Esparza became the Mexican national all-around champion, also taking the gold on the uneven bars and the silver on the balance beam. She was selected to the Mexican team for the 2018 Pan American Championships alongside Paulina Campos, Alexa Moreno, Nicolle Castro and Natalia Escalera. They took the bronze medal in the team final behind the United States and Brazil. Individually, Esparza placed ninth in the all-around final. Esparza also competed at the 2018 World Championships in Doha, Qatar, where she placed 32nd in the individual all-around and 19th with the Mexican team.

In 2019, Esparza won the gold medal in the uneven bars final at the Guimarães World Challenge Cup in Portugal. At the 2019 World Championships in Stuttgart, Germany she placed 21st with the Mexican team during qualifications.

Esparza joined the UCLA Bruins women's gymnastics team as a freshman for the 2020–21 season. At the 2021 PAC-12 Championships, she contributed to the team's third-place finish and placed fourth on the uneven bars individually.

== Competitive history ==
Year	Event	Team	AA	VT	UB	BB	FX
Junior
2016	U.S. Classic		13				
2016	U.S. Championships		24				
Senior
2017	Brestyan's National Qualifier		3rd place, bronze medalist(s)				
2017	U.S. Classic		11				
2017	U.S. Championships		21				
2018	Mexican Championships		1st place, gold medalist(s)		1st place, gold medalist(s)	2nd place, silver medalist(s)	
2018	Mexican Trial		1st place, gold medalist(s)	3rd place, bronze medalist(s)	1st place, gold medalist(s)	1st place, gold medalist(s)	
2018	Pan American Championships	3rd place, bronze medalist(s)	9				
2018	World Championships	19	32				
2019	Guimarães World Challenge Cup				1st place, gold medalist(s)		
2019	World Championships	21					
NCAA
2021	PAC-12 Championships	3rd place, bronze medalist(s)			4		
