= Gymnastics at the 2019 Pan American Games – Women's artistic individual all-around =

Women's artistic team all-around at the 2019 Pan American Games
- Venue: Polideportivo Villa el Salvador
- Dates: July 29
- Competitors: 24 from 14 nations
- Winning score: 55.250

Medalists
Gold medal	Ellie Black	Canada
Silver medal	Riley McCusker	United States
Bronze medal	Flávia Saraiva	Brazil

The women's artistic individual all-around gymnastic event at the 2019 Pan American Games was held on July 29 at the Polideportivo Villa el Salvador in Lima, Peru. Ellie Black of Canada successfully defended her title from the 2015 Pan American Games.

== Schedule ==
All times are Peru Time (UTC-5).

Date	Time	Round
July 27	15:00	Subdivision 1
July 27	17:20	Subdivision 2
July 27	20:30	Subdivision 3
July 29	18:50	Final

== Results ==
=== Final ===
Oldest and youngest competitors

	Name	Country	Date of birth	Age
Youngest	Luna Fernandez	Argentina	June 23, 2003	16 years, 1 month and 6 days
Oldest	Simona Castro	Chile	January 11, 1989	30 years, 6 months and 18 days

Rank	Gymnast	Vault (gymnastics)	Uneven bars	Balance beam	Floor (gymnastics)	Total
1st place, gold medalist(s)	Ellie Black (CAN)	14.450	14.300	13.900	12.600	55.250
2nd place, silver medalist(s)	Riley McCusker (USA)	14.250	13.150	14.200	13.525	55.125
3rd place, bronze medalist(s)	Flávia Saraiva (BRA)	14.150	12.800	13.500	13.900	54.350
4	Kara Eaker (USA)	13.950	13.950	13.500	12.350	53.750
5	Martina Dominici (ARG)	13.850	13.300	12.800	12.850	52.800
6	Thais Fidelis (BRA)	13.700	12.750	13.000	13.250	52.700
7	Danusia Francis (JAM)	13.500	12.750	12.750	12.650	51.650
8	Victoria-Kayen Woo (CAN)	13.500	12.950	12.550	12.250	51.250
9	Luna Fernandez (ARG)	13.350	12.750	12.00	12.350	50.450
10	Marcia Vidiaux (CUB)	14.150	13.000	10.900	11.950	50.000
11	Andrea Maldonado (PUR)	13.400	12.000	11.100	12.400	48.900
12	Yesenia Ferrera (CUB)	14.500	10.450	11.250	12.500	48.700
13	Luciana Alvarado (CRC)	13.250	11.350	12.450	11.400	48.450
14	Simona Castro (CHI)	13.250	12.650	10.650	11.700	48.250
15	Anapaula Gutierrez (MEX)	13.900	11.850	11.100	10.900	47.750
16	Karelys Diaz (PUR)	13.050	11.300	11.475	11.650	47.475
17	Sandra Collantes (PER)	12.950	10.950	11.350	12.200	47.450
18	Paulina Campos (MEX)	12.050	10.950	11.500	12.100	46.600
19	Heika Salas (CRC)	12.350	12.350	10.200	11.400	46.300
20	Ariana Orrego (PER)	13.350	11.400	9.750	11.750	46.250
21	Katriel de Sousa (VEN)	12.950	11.750	9.550	11.650	45.900
22	Ana Palacios (GUA)	13.950	10.400	8.850	12.600	45.800
23	Paola Ruano (ESA)	12.150	10.825	11.700	11.100	45.775
24	María del Sol Pérez (CHI)	11.700	11.600	10.150	10.550	44.000

=== Qualification ===
Riley McCusker of the United States qualified in first place with 57.050 points. Eight gymnasts did not advance to either the final or as a reserve due to the two-per-country rule.

Rank	Gymnast	Vault (gymnastics)	Uneven bars	Balance beam	Floor (gymnastics)	Total	Qual.
1	Riley McCusker (USA)	13.850	14.900	14.250	14.050	57.050	Q
2	Kara Eaker (USA)	14.200	13.800	14.850	13.850	56.700	Q
3	Ellie Black (CAN)	14.550	14.050	12.950	13.550	55.100	Q
4	Morgan Hurd (USA)	14.300	14.250	13.100	13.300	54.950	–
5	Flávia Saraiva (BRA)	14.500	12.800	12.900	13.800	54.000	Q
6	Martina Dominici (ARG)	14.600	13.350	11.700	13.200	52.850	Q
7	Thais Fidelis (BRA)	13.550	12.950	12.200	13.300	52.000	Q
8	Danusia Francis (JAM)	13.350	12.875	12.950	12.800	51.975	Q
9	Victoria-Kayen Woo (CAN)	13.550	12.600	12.600	13.100	51.850	Q
10	Carolyne Pedro (BRA)	13.450	13.150	11.950	12.800	51.350	–
11	Ariana Orrego (PER)	13.700	12.000	12.750	12.850	51.300	Q
12	Brooklyn Moors (CAN)	12.500	13.100	11.950	13.500	51.050	–
13	Marcia Vidiaux (CUB)	14.200	12.700	11.200	12.800	50.900	Q
14	Sandra Collantes (PER)	13.700	12.575	11.700	12.550	50.525	Q
15	Ana Palacios (GUA)	14.200	11.350	11.500	12.950	50.000	Q
16	Anapaula Gutierrez (MEX)	13.750	12.375	11.900	11.950	49.975	Q
17	Yesenia Ferrera (CUB)	14.500	11.500	11.650	12.050	49.700	Q
18	Karelys Diaz (PUR)	13.050	11.500	12.350	12.100	49.000	Q
19	Luciana Alvarado (CRC)	13.350	11.350	12.150	11.950	48.800	Q
20	Simona Castro (CHI)	13.300	12.200	10.700	12.050	48.250	Q
21	Paulina Campos (MEX)	12.500	11.650	12.250	11.650	48.050	Q
22	Fabiola Diaz (PER)	13.300	10.500	12.950	11.250	48.000	–
23	Jimena Gutierrez (MEX)	12.650	12.250	11.350	11.700	47.950	–
24	Andrea Maldonado (PUR)	13.300	12.050	10.200	12.200	47.750	Q
25	Luna Fernandez (ARG)	11.650	12.300	11.750	11.800	47.500	Q
26	Heika Salas (CRC)	11.750	12.700	10.900	11.850	47.200	Q
27	Paola Ruano (ESA)	12.400	11.025	11.800	11.350	46.575	Q
28	Katriel de Sousa (VEN)	13.250	10.250	10.950	11.850	46.300	Q
29	María del Sol Pérez (CHI)	11.950	11.950	10.800	11.350	46.050	Q
30	Daniela Briceño (MEX)	11.800	12.700	10.500	10.300	45.300	–
31	Franchesca Santi (CHI)	14.050	10.650	8.350	12.100	45.150	–
32	Pierina Cedres (URU)	12.150	10.700	10.700	11.200	44.750	R1
33	Kiara Richmon (JAM)	12.600	11.400	9.950	10.650	44.600	R2
34	Paula Mejias (PUR)	13.700	10.400	9.300	11.000	44.400	–
35	Diana Vasquez (BOL)	13.200	9.350	10.750	10.950	44.250	R3
36	Angie Rodriguez (COL)	12.700	9.800	10.575	10.900	43.975	R4
