= Katrine Sakhnov =

American rhythmic gymnast (born 2006)

- Born: June 12, 2006 (age 20) Sammamish, Washington, U.S.
- Height: 5 ft 9 in (175 cm)

Gymnastics career
- Discipline: Rhythmic gymnastics
- Country represented: United States; (2021-2024)
- Head coach: Margarita Mamzina
Medal record
Rhythmic gymnastics
Representing United States
Pan American Games
Bronze medal – third place	2023 Santiago	Group all-Around
Bronze medal – third place	2023 Santiago	5 Hoops
Bronze medal – third place	2023 Santiago	3 ribbons + 2 balls
Pan American Championships
Bronze medal – third place	2022 Rio de Janeiro	Group All-around
Bronze medal – third place	2022 Rio de Janeiro	5 hoops
Bronze medal – third place	2022 Rio de Janeiro	3 ribbons + 2 balls
Bronze medal – third place	2023 Guadalajara	Group All-around

Katrine Sakhnov (born 12 June 2006) is a Russian-American rhythmic gymnast. She's a multiple Pan American medalist.

== Career ==
Sakhnov entered the starting five of the national senior group in 2022, taking part in the World Cup in Pamplona where they were 10th in the All-Around. A week later, she competed in Portimão, where the team again finished 10th in the All-Around and 5 hoops, as well as 9th with 3 ribbons and 2 balls. In June, she took part in the World Cup in Pesaro, where the team placed 13th in the All-Around, 11th with 5 hoops, and 13th with 3 ribbons and 2 balls. In late August, she competed at the World Cup in Cluj-Napoca, where the group was 12th in the All-Around, 14th with 5 hoops and 12th with 3 ribbons and 2 balls. In September, Sakhnov attended the World Championships in Sofia along with Karolina Saverino, Gergana Petkova and Emily Wilson; they took 15th place in the All-Around and with 5 hoops, and 16th with 3 ribbons and 2 balls.

In 2023, Sakhnov started the season winning bronze in the All-Around and silver with 5 hoops at Miss Valentine. At the Aphrodite Cup, the group won silver in the All-Around and with 5 hoops and bronze with 3 ribbons and two balls. At the World Cup in Athens, they were 12th in the All-Around. In Baku, they were 14th, and 11th in Portimão. At the Pan American Championships, she and the group won bronze in the All-Around and with 5 hoops. At the World Cup in Cluj-Napoca they were 10th and in Milan 15th. She was subsequently selected for the World Championships along Isabelle Connor, Gergana Petkova, Karolina Saverino, Hana Starkman and individuals Evita Griskenas and Lili Mizuno, ending 18th in the All-Around, 24th with 5 hoops and 16th with 3 ribbons & 2 balls. As part of Team USA, Katrine represented USA in Pan American Games, Santiago, Chile together with Isabelle Connor, Gergana Petkova, Karolina Saverino, Hana Starkman and individuals Evita Griskenas and Lili Mizuno, taking all around bronze and bronze in each five hoops and three ribbons and two balls
