= Gymnastics at the 2023 Pan American Games =

- Gymnastics pictograms
- Venue: Training Center for Collective Sport
- Start date: October 21, 2023
- End date: November 4, 2023
- No. of events: 26 (10 men, 16 women)
- Competitors: 197 from 22 nations

Gymnastics competitions at the 2023 Pan American Games in Santiago, Chile, took place between October 21 and November 4, 2023, at the Training Center for Collective Sport in the National Stadium Cluster.

The artistic competitions took place between October 21 and 25. The rhythmic competition took place between November 1 and 4. The trampoline competition took place between November 3 and 4.

26 medal events were contested; 14 in artistic gymnastics (eight for men, six for women), eight in rhythmic (all for women), and four in trampoline (two per gender). Synchronized trampoline was contested for the first time. A total of 197 gymnasts competed: 118 in artistic (59 per gender), 53 in rhythmic, and 26 in trampoline (13 per gender).

== Qualification ==
A total of up to 201 gymnasts are allowed to compete (122 in artistic, 53 in rhythmic and 26 in trampoline). A nation may enter a maximum of 21 athletes across all disciplines (five in each gender for artistic, five athletes in rhythmic group, two in individual and two in each trampoline event). All individual gold medalists from the 2021 Junior Pan American Games in Cali, Colombia also qualify in addition to the maximum quota per nation. All qualification was done via each discipline's 2023 Pan American Gymnastics Championships.

== Medal summary ==
=== Medal table ===
* Host nation (Chile)

Rank	Nation	Gold	Silver	Bronze	Total
1	Brazil	11	16	4	31
2	United States	10	4	9	23
3	Canada	3	3	5	11
4	Colombia	1	0	1	2
5	Dominican Republic	1	0	0	1
6	Mexico	0	3	4	7
7	Argentina	0	1	1	2
8	Puerto Rico	0	0	1	1
Totals (8 entries)		26	27	25	78

=== Artistic gymnastics ===
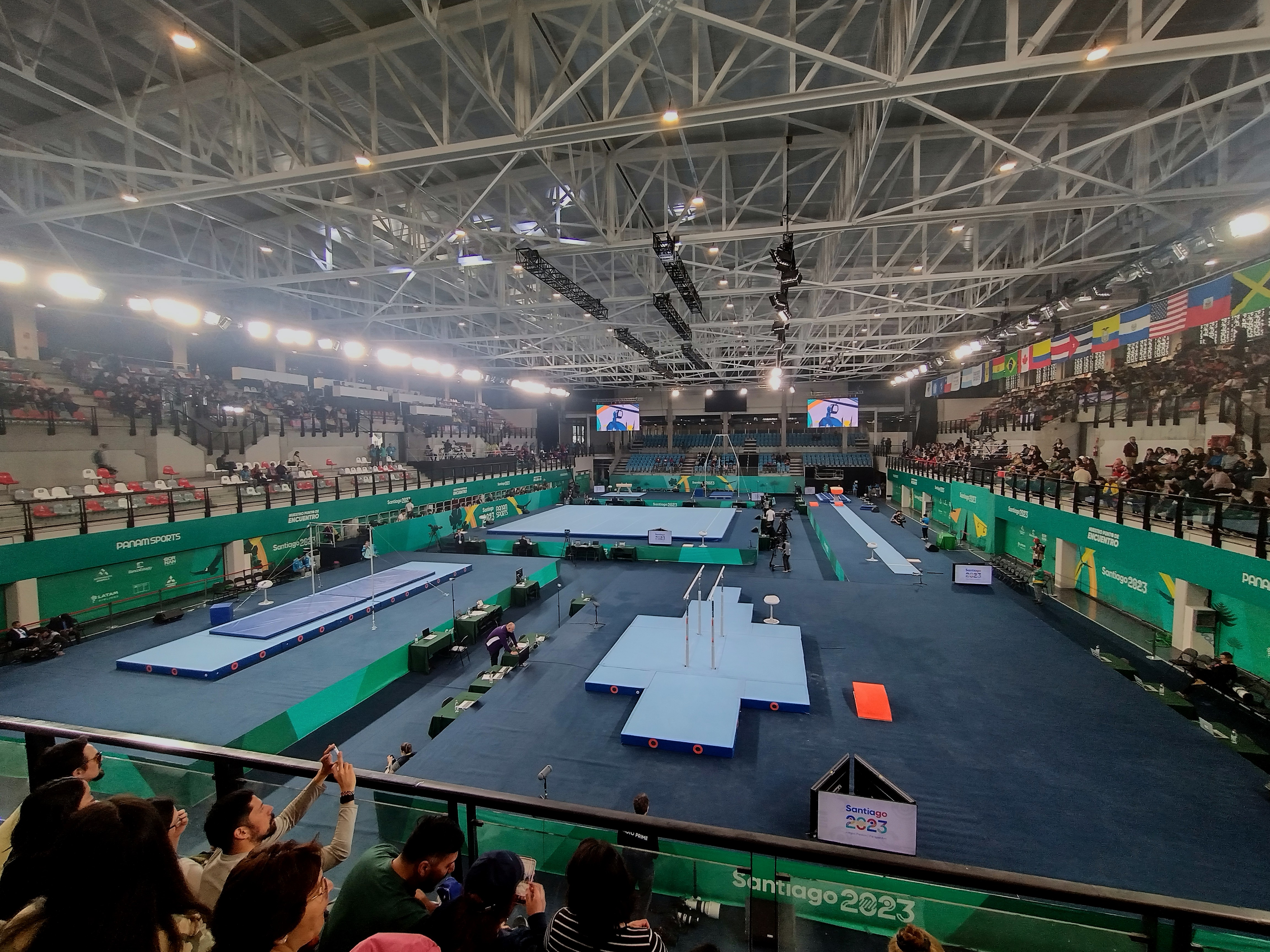
The gymnastics venue during the competition.

==== Men ====
Games	Gold	Silver	Bronze
Team all-around	United States; Cameron Bock; Stephen Nedoroscik; Curran Phillips; Colt Walker; Donnell Whittenburg	Canada; Zachary Clay; René Cournoyer; Félix Dolci; William Émard; Jayson Rampersad	Brazil; Yuri Guimarães; Arthur Mariano; Bernardo Miranda; Patrick Sampaio; Diogo Soares
Individual all-around	Félix Dolci; Canada	Diogo Soares; Brazil	Donnell Whittenburg; United States
Floor exercise	Félix Dolci; Canada	Arthur Mariano; Brazil	Juan Larrahondo; Colombia
Pommel horse	Zachary Clay; Canada	Jayson Rampersad; Canada	Nelson Guilbe; Puerto Rico
Rings	Donnell Whittenburg; United States	Daniel Villafañe; Argentina	Félix Dolci; Canada
Vault	Audrys Nin Reyes; Dominican Republic	Arthur Mariano; Brazil	Félix Dolci; Canada
Parallel bars	Curran Phillips; United States	Colt Walker; United States	Isaac Núñez; Mexico
Horizontal bar	Arthur Mariano; Brazil	Bernardo Miranda; Brazil	René Cournoyer; Canada

==== Women ====
Event	Gold	Silver	Bronze
Team all-around	United States; Jordan Chiles; Kayla DiCello; Kaliya Lincoln; Zoe Miller; Tiana Sumanasekera	Brazil; Rebeca Andrade; Jade Barbosa; Carolyne Pedro; Flávia Saraiva; Júlia Soares	Canada; Cassie Lee; Frédérique Sgarbossa; Ava Stewart; Aurélie Tran; Sydney Turner
Individual all-around	Kayla DiCello; United States	Flávia Saraiva; Brazil	Jordan Chiles; United States
Vault	Rebeca Andrade; Brazil	Jordan Chiles; United States	Natalia Escalera; Mexico
Uneven bars	Zoe Miller; United States	Rebeca Andrade; Brazil	Flávia Saraiva; Brazil
Balance beam	Rebeca Andrade; Brazil	Flávia Saraiva; Brazil	Ava Stewart; Canada
Floor exercise	Kaliya Lincoln; United States	Kayla DiCello; United States	Not awarded
Floor exercise	Kaliya Lincoln; United States	Flávia Saraiva; Brazil	Not awarded

=== Rhythmic gymnastics ===
==== Individual ====
Event	Gold	Silver	Bronze
Individual all-around	Bárbara Domingos; Brazil	Evita Griskenas; United States	Maria Eduarda Alexandre; Brazil
Ball	Bárbara Domingos; Brazil	Geovanna Santos; Brazil	Evita Griskenas; United States
Clubs	Maria Eduarda Alexandre; Brazil	Bárbara Domingos; Brazil	Evita Griskenas; United States
Hoop	Maria Eduarda Alexandre; Brazil	Bárbara Domingos; Brazil	Evita Griskenas; United States
Ribbon	Bárbara Domingos; Brazil	Maria Eduarda Alexandre; Brazil	Evita Griskenas; United States

==== Group ====
Event	Gold	Silver	Bronze
Group all-around	Brazil; Bárbara Urquiza; Gabriella Coradine; Victória Borges; Giovanna Oliveira; Nicole Pircio	Mexico; Julia Gutiérrez; Ana Flores; Kimberly Salazar; Adirem Tejeda; Dalia Alcocer	United States; Katrine Sakhnov; Gergana Petkova; Hana Starkman; Isabelle Connor; Karolina Saverino
5 hoops	Brazil; Bárbara Urquiza; Gabriella Coradine; Victória Borges; Giovanna Oliveira; Nicole Pircio	Mexico; Julia Gutiérrez; Ana Flores; Kimberly Salazar; Adirem Tejeda; Dalia Alcocer	United States; Katrine Sakhnov; Gergana Petkova; Hana Starkman; Isabelle Connor; Karolina Saverino
3 ribbons + 2 balls	Brazil; Bárbara Urquiza; Gabriella Coradine; Victória Borges; Giovanna Oliveira; Nicole Pircio	Mexico; Julia Gutiérrez; Ana Flores; Kimberly Salazar; Adirem Tejeda; Dalia Alcocer	United States; Katrine Sakhnov; Gergana Petkova; Hana Starkman; Isabelle Connor; Karolina Saverino

=== Trampoline ===
Event	Gold	Silver	Bronze
Men's individual	Ángel Hernández; Colombia	Rayan Dutra; Brazil	Santiago Ferrari; Argentina
Men's synchronized	United States; Aliaksei Shostak; Ruben Padilla	Canada; Rémi Aubin; Keegan Soehn	Brazil; Lucas Tobias; Rayan Dutra
Women's individual	Jessica Stevens; United States	Camilla Gomes; Brazil	Dafne Navarro; Mexico
Women's synchronized	United States; Jessica Stevens; Nicole Ahsinger	Brazil; Alice Gomes; Camilla Gomes	Mexico; Dafne Navarro; Mariola García

== Olympic berths ==
=== Artistic gymnastics ===
Two Olympic berths were contested at this event. The highest placing eligible gymnasts during the men's all-around final and the women's all-around final would earn these quotas. For the men this was Audrys Nin Reyes of the Dominican Republic. For women this was Luisa Blanco of Colombia.

=== Rhythmic gymnastics ===
Two Olympic berths were available for rhythmic gymnastics, one for an individual and one for a group. The berths went to the all-around silver medalists, individual Evita Griskenas and the group representing Mexico.

== See also ==
- Gymnastics at the 2024 Summer Olympics
