= Luciana Alvarado =

Costa Rican artistic gymnast

- Full name: Luciana Alvarado Reid
- Nickname: Luci
- Born: 16 September 2002 (age 23) San José, Costa Rica
- Height: 1.59 m (5 ft 3 in)

Gymnastics career
- Discipline: Women's artistic gymnastics
- Country represented: Costa Rica
- College team: Central Michigan Chippewas
- Club: Gym Stars Costa Rica
- Head coach: Sherlly Reid
- Assistant coach: Mariana Sanchez Reid
Medal record
Artistic gymnastics
Representing Costa Rica
Pan American Championships
Gold medal – first place	2021 Rio de Janeiro	Balance Beam
Silver medal – second place	2021 Rio de Janeiro	All-Around

Luciana Alvarado Reid (born 16 September 2002) is a Costa Rican artistic gymnast who represented her country at the 2019 World Championships and the 2019 Pan American Games. She took the silver medal in the all-around at the 2021 Pan American Championships, earning a continental berth for the 2020 Summer Olympics, and also became the Pan American champion on the balance beam. She is the first Costa Rican gymnast to qualify for the Olympics.

== Personal life ==
Alvarado was born on 16 September 2002 in San José, Costa Rica. She took up gymnastics at age two, and is coached by her mother, Sherlly Reid, who is a gym owner and former gymnast. Her sisters were also involved in gymnastics. Her middle sister, Mariana Sanchez Reid, is a former Costa Rica national team member.

== Career ==
=== Junior ===
Alvarado competed at the 2016 Pacific Rim Championships, placing 10th in the all-around and 9th with the Costa Rican team. She also qualified to the uneven bars final, but struggled in the final, finishing eighth. Later that year, Alvarado competed at the Pan American Championships, placing 10th in the all-around, fifth on the uneven bars and eighth on the balance beam, also contributing to the Costa Rican team's fifth-place finish. In June 2017, Alvarado competed at the Central American Sports Festival, placing fourth in the all-around and taking the silver medal on the uneven bars.

=== Senior ===
Alvarado turned senior in 2018. She competed vault, beam and floor at the 2018 Pacific Rim Championships, and bars and beam at the Central American and Caribbean Games, but did not reach the finals. She made her senior debut in the all-around at the 2018 Pan American Championships, placing 18th.

In 2019, Alvarado competed vault and beam at the FIT Challenge in Belgium, finishing 12th with the Costa Rican team. She represented Costa Rica at the 2019 Pan American Games, placing 13th in the all-around final. Alvarado made her World Championship debut at the 2019 World Championships. She placed 104th in the all-around during qualifications, missing out on an Olympic berth due to a fall.

At the 2021 Pan American Championships, Alvarado scored a 50.833, taking the bronze medal in the all-around behind Rebeca Andrade of Brazil and Martina Dominici of Argentina. However, Dominici was later disqualified after she had tested positive for a banned substance, making Alvarado the all-around silver medalist. Alvarado also qualified to the balance beam final, where she went on to win the gold medal. Based on the result of the all-around, she earned a continental quota spot to the Tokyo Olympics, becoming the first Costa Rican gymnast to qualify for an Olympic Games.

At the 2020 Summer Olympics, Alvarado placed 51st in the all-around during qualifications with a score of 51.306, and did not advance to the final. During the competition, Alvarado incorporated a tribute to the Black Lives Matter movement into her floor exercise choreography by taking the knee and raising her fist towards the sky.

== Collegiate career ==
Alvarado currently competes for Central Michigan University.

== Competitive history ==
Year	Event	Team	AA	VT	UB	BB	FX
Junior
2016	Pacific Rim Championships	9	10		8		
2016	Pan American Championships	5	10		5	8	
2017	Central American Sports Festival		4		2nd place, silver medalist(s)		
Senior
2018
2018	Pan American Championships		18				
2019	FIT Challenge	12					
2019	Pan American Games		13				
2019	World Championships		104				
2021
2021	Pan American Championships		2nd place, silver medalist(s)			1st place, gold medalist(s)	
2021	Olympic Games		51				
