= Gergana Petkova =

American rhythmic gymnast (born 2004)

- Born: May 31, 2004 (age 22) Illinois, United States of America

Gymnastics career
- Discipline: Rhythmic gymnastics
- Country represented: United States; (2021–)
- Head coach: Margarita Mamzina
Medal record
Rhythmic gymnastics
Representing United States
Pan American Games
Bronze medal – third place	2023 Santiago	Group all-Around
Bronze medal – third place	2023 Santiago	5 Hoops
Bronze medal – third place	2023 Santiago	3 ribbons + 2 balls
Pan American Championships
Bronze medal – third place	2022 Rio de Janeiro	Group All-around
Bronze medal – third place	2022 Rio de Janeiro	5 hoops
Bronze medal – third place	2022 Rio de Janeiro	3 ribbons + 2 balls
Bronze medal – third place	2023 Guadalajara	Group All-around

Gergana Petkova (born May 31, 2004) is an American rhythmic gymnast, member of the national group.

== Personal life ==
Petkova took up rhythmic gymnastics at age four at the Elite Sports Complex in Woodridge, following her sister Viara into the sport. Her dream is to compete at the 2024 Olympic Games in Paris.

== Career ==
Gergana entered the starting five of the national senior group in 2021, debuting at the World Championships in Kitakyushu along Camilla Feeley, Isabella Ivanova, Nicole Khoma, Karolina Saverino, Emily Wilson. The finished in 10th in the All-Around, with 5 hoops and 3 hoops and 4 clubs.

In 2022 she took part in the World Cup in Pamplona where they were 10th in the All-Around. A week later she competed in Portimão finishing 10th in the All-Around and with 5 hoops and 9th with 3 ribbons and 2 balls. In June she took part in the World Cup in Pesaro taking 13th place in the All-Around, 11th with 5 hoops and 13th with 3 ribbons and 2 balls. Petkova represented the USA at the Pan American Gymnastics Championships with Maria Bolkhovitinova, Katrine Sakhnov, Karolina Saverino, Hana Starkman, Emily Wilson, winning bronze in the All-Around as well as the two event finals. In late August she competed at the World Cup in Cluj-Napoca where the group was 12th in the All-Around, 14th with 5 hoops and 12th with 3 ribbons and 2 balls. In September Gergana attended the World Championships in Sofia along Katrine Sakhnov, Karolina Saverino, Hana Starkman, Emily Wilson, they took 15th place in the All-Around and with 5 hoops, 16th with 3 ribbons and 2 balls.
