= 2018 Pan American Gymnastics Championships =

International sports competition

Pan American Gymnastics Championships
- Location: Lima, Peru
- Date: September 5–30, 2018

The 2018 Pan American Gymnastics Championships was held in Lima, Peru, in September, 2018. Three gymnastics disciplines were contested: artistic gymnastics (from September 11 to 16), rhythmic gymnastics (from September 26 to 30) and trampoline (from September 5 to 9). The event was organized by the Peruvian Gymnastics Federation under the supervision of the Pan American Gymnastics Union and the International Gymnastics Federation, and served as qualification for the 2019 Pan American Games, which were also held in Lima, Peru.

== Medalists ==
=== Artistic gymnastics ===
Event	Gold	Silver	Bronze
Men
Team all-around	United States; Cameron Bock; Spencer Goodell; Riley Loos; Kanji Oyama; Genki Suzuki	Colombia; Jossimar Calvo; Didier Lugo; Andrés Martínez; Javier Sandoval; José David Toro	Brazil; Francisco Barreto; Lucas Bittencourt; Leonardo de Souza; Luís Porto; Caio Souza
Individual all-around	Manrique Larduet (CUB)	René Cournoyer (CAN)	Cameron Bock (USA)
Floor exercise	Tomás González (CHI)	Manrique Larduet (CUB)	Cameron Bock (USA)
Pommel horse	Genki Suzuki (USA)	Manrique Larduet (CUB) Cameron Bock (USA)	—N/a
Rings	Fabián de Luna (MEX)	Federico Molinari (ARG)	Daniel Villafañe (ARG)
Vault	Caio Souza (BRA)	Daniel Agüero (PER)	José David Toro (COL)
Parallel bars	Manrique Larduet (CUB)	Jossimar Calvo (COL)	Cameron Bock (USA)
Horizontal bar	Caio Souza (BRA)	Francisco Barreto (BRA)	Randy Lerú (CUB)
Women
Team all-around	United States; Jade Carey; Kara Eaker; Shilese Jones; Grace McCallum; Trinity Thomas	Brazil; Rebeca Andrade; Jade Barbosa; Thaís Fidélis; Lorrane Oliveira; Flávia Saraiva	Mexico; Paulina Campos; Nicolle Castro; Natalia Escalera; Frida Esparza; Alexa Moreno
Individual all-around	Grace McCallum (USA)	Trinity Thomas (USA)	Flávia Saraiva (BRA)
Vault	Jade Carey (USA)	Marcia Vidiaux (CUB)	Grace McCallum (USA)
Uneven bars	Grace McCallum (USA)	Trinity Thomas (USA)	Nicolle Castro (MEX)
Balance beam	Kara Eaker (USA)	Flávia Saraiva (BRA)	Grace McCallum (USA)
Floor exercise	Jade Carey (USA)	Flávia Saraiva (BRA)	Kara Eaker (USA)

=== Rhythmic gymnastics ===
Event	Gold	Silver	Bronze
Team all-around	United States; Nastasya Generalova; Lili Mizuno; Laura Zeng	Mexico; Rut Castillo; Karla Diaz; Marina Malpica	Brazil; Heloisa Bornal; Barbara Domingos; Natália Gaudio; Mariany Miyamoto
Individual all-around	Laura Zeng (USA)	Marina Malpica (MEX)	Natália Gaudio (BRA)
Group all-around	Mexico; Mildred Maldonado; Marcela Quijano; Sara Ruiz; Itzel Sainz; Karen Villanueva	United States; Dasha Baltovick; Isabelle Connor; Ugne Dragunas; Connie Du; Elizaveta Pletneva; Nicole Sladkov	Brazil; Vitoria Guerra; Jessica Maier; Deborah Medrado; Gabrielle Moraes; Nicole Pircio; Karine Walter
Hoop	Laura Zeng (USA)	Lili Mizuno (USA)	Marina Malpica (MEX)
Ball	Laura Zeng (USA)	Nastasya Generalova (USA)	Rut Castillo (MEX)
Clubs	Laura Zeng (USA)	Nastasya Generalova (USA)	Sophie Crane (CAN)
Ribbon	Laura Zeng (USA)	Karla Diaz (MEX)	Barbara Domingos (BRA)
Group 5 hoops	Brazil; Vitoria Guerra; Jessica Maier; Deborah Medrado; Gabrielle Moraes; Nicole Pircio; Karine Walter	Mexico; Mildred Maldonado; Marcela Quijano; Sara Ruiz; Itzel Sainz; Karen Villanueva	Canada; Elizabet Belittchenko; Vanessa Panov; Anastasia Shanko; Alexandra Udachina; Alexandra Zilyuk
Group 3 balls and 2 ropes	Mexico; Mildred Maldonado; Marcela Quijano; Sara Ruiz; Itzel Sainz; Karen Villanueva	United States; Dasha Baltovick; Isabelle Connor; Ugne Dragunas; Connie Du; Elizaveta Pletneva; Nicole Sladkov	Brazil; Vitoria Guerra; Jessica Maier; Deborah Medrado; Gabrielle Moraes; Nicole Pircio; Karine Walter

=== Trampoline gymnastics ===
Event	Gold	Silver	Bronze
Men
Individual trampoline	Jeffrey Gluckstein (USA)	Jason Burnett (CAN)	Esaul Ceballos (MEX)
Trampoline team	Canada; Jason Burnett; Jacob Cranham; Keegan Soehn; Trevor Stirling	United States; Jeffrey Gluckstein; Isaac Rowley; Joseph Isenberg	Mexico; Esaul Ceballos; Amado Lozano; Oswaldo Prieto; Luis Loria
Synchronised trampoline	Lucas Adorno (ARG); Federico Cury (ARG)	Lucas Tobias (BRA); João Fonseca (BRA)	Keegan Soehn (CAN); Trevor Stirling (CAN)
Double mini	Callum Sundquist (CAN)	Lucas Adorno (ARG)	Bernardo Aquino (ARG)
Double mini team	Argentina; Lucas Adorno; Bernardo Aquino; Federico Cury; Maximiliano Llanes	Canada; Callum Sundquist; Ryan Sheehan; Connar Tomalty; Mark Armstrong	—N/a
Women
Individual trampoline	Sophiane Methot (CAN)	Nicole Ahsinger (USA)	Jessica Stevens (USA)
Trampoline team	United States; Nicole Ahsinger; Jessica Stevens; Olivia Simpson	Argentina; Lucila Maldonado; Mara Colombo; Delfina Podesta; Marianela Galli	Mexico; Dafne Navarro; Katia Mariscal; Melissa Flores; Patricia Nuñez
Synchronised trampoline	Sophiane Methot (CAN); Sarah Milette (CAN)	Nicole Ahsinger (USA); Olivia Simpson (USA)	Camilla Gomes (BRA); Daienne Lima (BRA)
Double mini	Lucila Maldonado (ARG)	Laurence Roux (CAN)	Mara Colombo (ARG)
Double mini team	Canada; Laurence Roux; Danielle Grieve; Haley Nakonechni	Argentina; Mara Colombo; Lucila Maldonado; Marianela Galli	—N/a

== Medal table ==
Rank	Nation	Gold	Silver	Bronze	Total
1	United States (USA)	16	11	7	34
2	Canada (CAN)	5	4	3	12
3	Brazil (BRA)	3	5	8	16
4	Mexico (MEX)	3	4	7	14
5	Argentina (ARG)	3	4	3	10
6	Cuba (CUB)	2	3	1	6
7	Chile (CHI)	1	0	0	1
8	Colombia (COL)	0	2	1	3
9	Peru (PER)	0	1	0	1
Totals (9 entries)		33	34	30	97

== See also ==
- 2018 Junior Pan American Artistic Gymnastics Championships
- 2018 Pan American Aerobic Gymnastics Championships
