= Karolina Saverino =

American rhythmic gymnast (born 2004)

- Born: September 22, 2004 (age 22) Illinois, United States of America

Gymnastics career
- Discipline: Rhythmic gymnastics
- Country represented: United States; (2021–)
- Head coach: Margarita Mamzina
Medal record
Rhythmic gymnastics
Representing United States
Pan American Games
Bronze medal – third place	2023 Santiago	Group all-Around
Bronze medal – third place	2023 Santiago	5 Hoops
Bronze medal – third place	2023 Santiago	3 ribbons + 2 balls
Pan American Championships
Bronze medal – third place	2022 Rio de Janeiro	Group All-around
Bronze medal – third place	2022 Rio de Janeiro	5 hoops
Bronze medal – third place	2022 Rio de Janeiro	3 ribbons + 2 balls
Bronze medal – third place	2023 Guadalajara	Group All-around

Karolina Saverino (born 22 September 2004) is an American retired rhythmic gymnast who competed as a member of the national group.

== Personal life ==
Saverino took up the sport in 2008 after taking part in a summer class at the North Shore Rhythmic Gymnastics Center, although it took several months for her to enjoy the classes. Her favourite apparatus is hoop. Her dream is to compete at the Olympic Games. Outside the gym, her hobbies include reading, travel, drawing, journalling, and cooking.

== Career ==
Saverino entered the national senior group in 2021 and debuted at the World Championships in Kitakyushu along with her teammates Camilla Feeley, Isabella Ivanova, Nicole Khoma, Gergana Petkova, and Emily Wilson. The finished in 10th in the all-around as well as in both group apparatus finals.

In 2022 she took part in the World Cup in Pamplona where the group was 10th in the all-around. A week later she competed in the World Cup in Portimão, finishing 10th in the all-around and with 5 hoops and 9th with 3 ribbons and 2 balls. In June she took part in the World Cup in Pesaro, taking 13th place in the all-around, 11th with 5 hoops and 13th with 3 ribbons and 2 balls.

Saverino represented the US at the Pan American Gymnastics Championships in July with Maria Bolkhovitinova, Katrine Sakhnov, Gergana Petkova, Hana Starkman, Emily Wilson. They won bronze in the all-around as well as the two event finals. In late August she competed at the World Cup in Cluj-Napoca, where the group was 12th in the all-around, 14th with 5 hoops and 12th with 3 ribbons and 2 balls. In September Karolina attended the World Championships in Sofia along with her teammates Katrine Sakhnov, Gergana Petkova, Hana Starkman, and Emily Wilson. They took 15th place in the all-around and with 5 hoops and 16th with 3 ribbons and 2 balls.

At the 2023 Pan American Games, Saverino won three bronze medals with the group in the all-around and both event finals.

She announced her retirement in May 2024.
