= Hana Starkman =

American rhythmic gymnast (born 2004)

- Born: August 2, 2004 (age 22) Miami, United States of America

Gymnastics career
- Discipline: Rhythmic gymnastics
- Country represented: United States; (2021–)
- Head coach: Margarita Mamzina
Medal record
Rhythmic gymnastics
Representing United States
Pan American Games
Bronze medal – third place	2023 Santiago	Group all-Around
Bronze medal – third place	2023 Santiago	5 Hoops
Bronze medal – third place	2023 Santiago	3 ribbons + 2 balls
Pan American Championships
Bronze medal – third place	2022 Rio de Janeiro	Group All-around
Bronze medal – third place	2022 Rio de Janeiro	5 hoops
Bronze medal – third place	2022 Rio de Janeiro	3 ribbons + 2 balls
Bronze medal – third place	2023 Guadalajara	Group All-around

Hana Starkman (born 2 August 2004) is an American rhythmic gymnast. She's a multiple Pan American medalist.

== Personal life ==
She took up the sport at age five after having tried various activities. Her dream is to compete at the 2024 Olympic Games in Paris. She has been studying for a degree in health education with the University of Florida, in her free time she enjoys playing the piano and tennis.

== Career ==
Hana entered the starting five of the national senior group in 2022, taking part in the World Cup in Pamplona where they were 10th in the All-Around. A week later she competed in Portimão finishing 10th in the All-Around and with 5 hoops and 9th with 3 ribbons and 2 balls. In June she took part in the World Cup in Pesaro taking 13th place in the All-Around, 11th with 5 hoops and 13th with 3 ribbons and 2 balls. Petkova represented the USA at the Pan American Gymnastics Championships with Maria Bolkhovitinova, Katrine Sakhnov, Karolina Saverino, Gergana Petkova, Emily Wilson, winning bronze in the All-Around as well as the two event finals. In late August she competed at the World Cup in Cluj-Napoca where the group was 12th in the All-Around, 14th with 5 hoops and 12th with 3 ribbons and 2 balls. In September Gergana attended the World Championships in Sofia along Katrine Sakhnov, Karolina Saverino, Gergana Petkova, Emily Wilson, they took 15th place in the All-Around and with 5 hoops, 16th with 3 ribbons and 2 balls.

In 2023 she started the season winning bronze in the All-Around and silver with 5 hoops at Miss Valentine. At the Aphrodite Cup the group won silver in the All-Around and with 5 hoops and bronze with 3 ribbons & two balls. At the World Cup in Athens they were 12th in the All-Around. In Baku they were 14th and 11th in Portimão. At the Pan American Championships she and the group won bronze in the All-Around and with 5 hoops. At the World Cup in Cluj-Napoca they were 10th and in Milan15th. She was subsequently selected for the World Championships along Isabelle Connor, Gergana Petkova, Karolina Saverino, Katerine Sakhnov and individuals Evita Griskenas and Lili Mizuno, ending 18th in tha All-Around, 24th with 5 hoops and 3 ribbons & 2 balls.
