= Elizaveta Pletneva =

American rhythmic gymnast

- Nickname: Liza
- Born: January 21, 2002 (age 24) Saint Petersburg, Russia
- Height: 5 ft 8 in (173 cm)

Gymnastics career
- Discipline: Rhythmic gymnastics
- Country represented: United States; (2018 - present)
- Club: North Shore Rhythmic Gymnastics Center
Medal record
Rhythmic gymnastics
Representing United States
Pan American Games
| Silver medal – second place | 2019 Lima | Group all-around |
| Silver medal – second place | 2019 Lima | 5 balls |
Pan American Championships
| Silver medal – second place | 2018 Lima | Group all-around |
| Silver medal – second place | 2018 Lima | 3 balls + 2 ropes |
| Bronze medal – third place | 2021 Rio de Janeiro | Group All-around |
| Bronze medal – third place | 2021 Rio de Janeiro | 5 balls |
| Bronze medal – third place | 2021 Rio de Janeiro | 3 hoops + 4 clubs |

Elizaveta Pletneva (born January 21, 2002) is a Russian-born American group rhythmic gymnast who represented the United States at the 2020 Summer Olympics.

== Personal life ==
Pletneva and her family moved to the United States when she was three years old. She began rhythmic gymnastics when she was five years old.

== Career ==
Pletneva competed at the 2018 World Championships where the American group finished fourteenth in the all-around. Then at the 2018 Pan American Championships in Lima, she won the silver medal in both the group all-around and the 3 balls + 2 ropes event final, both behind Mexico.

Pletneva competed at the 2019 Pan American Games and won the silver medal in the group all-around and in the 5 balls event final, both times finishing behind Mexico. Then at the 2019 World Championships in Baku, the American group finished tenth.

At the 2021 Pan American Championships in Rio de Janeiro, Pletneva and the American group won the bronze medals in the all-around, and in both the 5 balls and the 3 hoops + 4 clubs event finals. The United States qualified for the 2020 Olympic Games after Japan's host spot was reallocated. Pletneva was selected to represent the United States at the 2020 Summer Olympics alongside Isabelle Connor, Camilla Feeley, Lili Mizuno, and Nicole Sladkov. They finished eleventh in the qualification round for the group all-around.
