= 2018 Junior Pan American Rhythmic Gymnastics Championships =

International sports competition

The 2018 Junior Pan American Rhythmic Gymnastics Championships was held in Medellín, Colombia, May 2–6, 2018.

== Medal summary ==
Event	Gold	Silver	Bronze
Team	United States; Elizabeth Kapitonova; Shannon Xiao; Matylda Marszalek	Canada; Haley Miller; Izabella Helbin; Natalie Garcia	Brazil; Maria Eduarda Arakaki; Amanda Santos; Maria Clara Souza
Individual all-around	Shannon Xiao (USA)	Natalie Garcia (CAN)	Elizabeth Kapitonova (USA)
Hoop	Shannon Xiao (USA)	Elizabeth Kapitonova (USA)	Natalie Garcia (CAN)
Ball	Elizabeth Kapitonova (USA)	Natalie Garcia (CAN)	Shannon Xiao (USA)
Clubs	Natalie Garcia (CAN)	Shannon Xiao (USA)	Elizabeth Kapitonova (USA)
Ribbon	Elizabeth Kapitonova (USA)	Shannon Xiao (USA)	Xitlaly Santana (MEX)
Group all-around	Chile	Brazil	United States
5 ropes	Chile	United States	Brazil
10 clubs	Brazil	United States	Chile

== Medal table ==
Rank	Nation	Gold	Silver	Bronze	Total
1	United States	5	5	4	14
2	Chile	2	0	1	3
3	Canada	1	3	1	5
4	Brazil	1	1	2	4
5	Mexico	0	0	1	1
Totals (5 entries)		9	9	9	27
