= Vitoria Guerra =

Brazilian rhythmic gymnast

- Born: June 3, 2001 (age 25)

Gymnastics career
- Discipline: Rhythmic gymnastics
- Country represented: Brazil; (2016-)
- Club: Gremio Nautico Uniao
- Head coach: Camila Ferezin
- Choreographer: Bruna Martins
Medal record
Rhythmic gymnastics
Representing Brazil
Junior Pan American Championships
Gold medal – first place	2016 Merida	Team
Gold medal – first place	2016 Merida	Hoop
Pan American Championships
Gold medal – first place	2018 Lima	5 hoops
Bronze medal – third place	2018 Lima	All-Around
Bronze medal – third place	2018 Lima	3 Balls & 2 Ropes
South American Championships
Gold medal – first place	2019 Bogotá	Group All-Around
Gold medal – first place	2019 Bogotá	5 Balls
Gold medal – first place	2019 Bogotá	3 Hoops & 2 Clubs
Pan American Games
Gold medal – first place	2019 Lima	3 Hoops & 2 Clubs
Bronze medal – third place	2019 Lima	Group All-Around
Bronze medal – third place	2019 Lima	5 Balls

Vitoria Guerra (born 3 June 2001) is a rhythmic gymnast and a member of the Brazilian national team. Guerra has won two gold medals and four bronze medals at Pan American Gymnastics Championships.

== Career ==
Guerra took up gymnastics at the age of eight. In 2016, she won gold in teams and with hoop at the Pan American Championships. As a senior, in 2017, Guerra placed 37th in the all-around at the World Cup in Sofia, Bulgaria.

In 2018, she became a member of the national group. The group competed at the World Championships in Sofia, finishing 18th in the all-around, 18th with 3 balls and 2 ropes, and 21st with 5 hoops. At the 2018 Pan American Championships, she won bronze in the all-around and with 3 balls and 2 ropes as well as gold with 5 hoops.

The following year, she won all three gold medals in the all-around and event finals at the South American Championships, and in August she went on to win bronze in the all-around and with 5 hoops and gold with 3 balls and 2 clubs at the Pan American Games. At the World Championships in Baku, the group was 13th in the all-around, 11th with 5 balls and 16th with 3 hoops and 2 clubs.

In 2021, Guerra finished 9th in the all-around, 7th with 5 balls and 11th with 3 hoops and 2 clubs at the World Championships along with her group teammates, Maria Arakaki, Deborah Medrado, Nicole Pircio, Beatriz Silva and Barbara Urquiza.
