= Haley de Jong =

Canadian artistic gymnast

- Born: 18 January 2001 (age 25) Vancouver, British Columbia, Canada

Gymnastics career
- Discipline: Women's artistic gymnastics
- Country represented: Canada (2016–19)
- College team: Georgia Gymdogs
- Club: Flicka Gymnastics
- Head coach: Dorina Stan
Medal record
Women's artistic gymnastics
Representing Canada
Pacific Rim Championships
Gold medal – first place	2018 Medellín	Uneven Bars
Silver medal – second place	2018 Medellín	Team
Bronze medal – third place	2018 Medellín	All-Around
Bronze medal – third place	2018 Medellín	Floor Exercise

Haley de Jong (born January 18, 2001) is a Canadian artistic gymnast and the 2018 Pacific Rim Uneven Bars champion.

== Early life ==
Haley de Jong was born in Vancouver, British Columbia in 2001.

== Gymnastics career ==
=== Junior ===
==== 2013–2015 ====
De Jong made her elite debut at Elite Canada in 2013 where she placed fourth in the novice division. In 2015 she once again competed at Elite Canada and placed seventh in the all-around in the Junior division. She also placed fifth on balance beam and won silver on floor exercise. In February 2015 she competed at the Canada Games where she placed eighth on the balance beam but won bronze with the team from British Columbia. In March 2015 de Jong made her international debut when she competed at International Gymnix where she placed eighteenth in the all-around and fourth in the team final. In May she competed at the Canadian Championships where she placed seventh in the all-around.

==== 2016 ====
De Jong competed at Elite Canada in February where she placed twelfth in the all-around, eighth on uneven bars, and won bronze on floor exercise. A week later she competed at the WOGA Classic where she placed second in the all-around behind Irina Alexeeva. In March de Jong competed at International Gymnix where she placed twenty-third in the all-around but won bronze in the team final. Later that year she competed at the Canadian Championships where she placed fourth in the all-around behind Ana Padurariu, Sayge Urban, and Brooklyn Moors. In September de Jong competed at the Pan American Championships where helped Canada win the team gold medal. Individually she placed fourth in the all-around behind Padurariu, Thais Fidelis of Brazil, and Urban, fifth on vault, and won bronze on balance behind Padurariu and Fidelis. In November de Jong competed at the Olympic Hopes Cup where she placed sixth in the all-around.

=== Senior ===
==== 2017 ====
In 2017 de Jong officially turned senior but spent most of the season dealing with injuries. She competed at the Salamunov Memorial in Maribor, Slovenia in October where she swept the competition. In December she competed at Toyota International in Japan where she placed fourth on floor exercise and eleventh on uneven bars and balance beam.

==== 2018 ====
In February de Jong competed at Elite Canada where she placed fourth in the all-around, third on vault, second on uneven bars, and eighth on balance beam and floor exercise. In March she competed at International Gymnix where she placed tenth in the all-around, seventh on vault, and tenth on uneven bars. She was later selected to represent Canada at the 2018 Pacific Rim Championships. While there she won bronze in the all-around and on floor exercise, gold on uneven bars, silver in the team final, and placed fifth on vault. A month later de Jong competed at the Canadian National Championships where she placed seventh in the all-around. In November de Jong signed her National Letter of Intent with the University of Georgia.

==== 2019 ====
De Jong competed at Elite Canada where she placed 22nd in the all-around and seventh on balance beam. The following month she competed at 2019 L'International Gymnix where she placed seventh in the all-around but won silver on vault, floor exercise, and in the team final alongside Laurie Denommée, Isabela Onyshko, and Emma Spence.

In May de Jong competed at the Canadian National Championships. She finished sixth in the all-around.

=== NCAA ===
==== 2019–20 ====
De Jong started her collegiate career in the 2019-2020 season with the Georgia Gymdogs. She competed on uneven bars and balance beam in all ten meets, earning a career high of 9.925 on the latter in a meet against Arkansas. All post-season meets, such as the SEC Championships and the NCAA Women's Gymnastics Championships, ended up being canceled due to the COVID-19 pandemic in the United States.

== Competitive history ==
Year	Event	Team	AA	VT	UB	BB	FX
Junior
2013	Elite Canada		4				
2015	Elite Canada		7			5	2nd place, silver medalist(s)
2015	Canada Games	3rd place, bronze medalist(s)				8	
2015	International Gymnix	4	18				
2015	Canadian Championships		7				
2016	Elite Canada		12		8		3rd place, bronze medalist(s)
2016	WOGA Classic		2nd place, silver medalist(s)				
2016	International Gymnix	3rd place, bronze medalist(s)	23				
2016	Canadian Championships		4				
2016	Pan American Championships	1st place, gold medalist(s)	4	5		3rd place, bronze medalist(s)	
2016	Olympic Hopes Cup		6				
Senior
2017	Salamunov Memorial		1st place, gold medalist(s)	1st place, gold medalist(s)	1st place, gold medalist(s)	1st place, gold medalist(s)	1st place, gold medalist(s)
2017	Toyota International				11	11	4
2018	Elite Canada		4	3rd place, bronze medalist(s)	2nd place, silver medalist(s)	8	8
2018	International Gymnix		10	7	10		
2018	Pacific Rim Championships	2nd place, silver medalist(s)	3rd place, bronze medalist(s)	7	1st place, gold medalist(s)		3rd place, bronze medalist(s)
2018	Canadian Championships		7				
2019	Elite Canada		22			7	
2019	International Gymnix	2nd place, silver medalist(s)	7	2nd place, silver medalist(s)			2nd place, silver medalist(s)
2019	Canadian Championships		6		12	6	5
NCAA
2020	SEC Championships	Canceled due to the COVID-19 pandemic in the USA					
2020	NCAA Championships	Canceled due to the COVID-19 pandemic in the USA					
