= Paulina Campos =

Mexican artistic gymnast (born 2000)

- Full name: Paulina Campos Martinez
- Nickname: Pepis
- Born: 13 April 2000 (age 26) San Luis Potosí, Mexico

Gymnastics career
- Discipline: Women's artistic gymnastics
- Country represented: Mexico; (since 2018)
- Head coach: Esmeralda Martínez
Medal record
Women's artistic gymnastics
Representing Mexico
Pan American Championships
Silver medal – second place	2021 Rio de Janeiro	Team
Silver medal – second place	2021 Rio de Janeiro	Balance beam
Silver medal – second place	2023 Medellín	Team
Bronze medal – third place	2018 Lima	Team
Pacific Rim Championships
Silver medal – second place	2018 Medellín	Balance beam
Central American and Caribbean Games
Gold medal – first place	2023 San Salvador	Team
Gold medal – first place	2023 San Salvador	Uneven bars
Gold medal – first place	2023 San Salvador	Balance beam
Gold medal – first place	2026 Santo Domingo	Team
Bronze medal – third place	2018 Barranquilla	Team

Paulina Campos Martínez (Note: In this Spanish name, the first or paternal surname is Campos and the second or maternal family name is Martínez.) (born 13 April 2000) is a Mexican artistic gymnast. She is the 2021 Pan American Championships and 2018 Pacific Rim Championships balance beam silver medalist. She won three gold medals at the 2023 Central American and Caribbean Games.

== Gymnastics career ==
Campos began gymnastics at the age of three and has been coached by her mother, Esmeralda Martínez, since the start of her career.

=== 2018–2019 ===
Campos won a silver medal on the balance beam at the 2018 Pacific Rim Championships behind Australia's Talia Folino. She then competed with the Mexican team that won a bronze medal at the 2018 Central American and Caribbean Games. She also helped Mexico win the team bronze medal at the 2018 Pan American Championships.

Campos won a silver medal in the all-around at the 2019 Mexican Championships. She then represented Mexico at the 2019 Pan American Games and finished 18th in the all-around final.

=== 2021–2022 ===
Campos helped Mexico win the silver medal behind Brazil at the 2021 Pan American Championships. Individually, she won a silver medal in the balance beam final behind Costa Rica's Luciana Alvarado. She competed at the 2021 World Championships but did not advance into any finals.

At the 2022 Mexican Championships, Campos won the bronze medal in the all-around. She competed with the Mexican team that finished fourth at the 2022 Pan American Championships. She finished seventh in the floor exercise final at the 2022 Szombathely World Challenge Cup. At the 2022 World Championships, Campos and the Mexican team finished 15th in the qualification round.

=== 2023–2024 ===
Campos helped Mexico win the team silver medal at the 2023 Pan American Championships. She then won a gold medal with the Mexican team at the 2023 Central American and Caribbean Games. In the event finals, she won the gold medals on both the uneven bars and the balance beam. At the 2023 World Championships, she helped Mexico finish 14th in the qualification round. She represented Mexico at the 2023 Pan American Games and helped Mexico finish fourth in the team event. She qualified for the uneven bars final and finished eighth.

Campos won a bronze medal on the uneven bars at the 2024 International Gymnix.
