= Huber Godoy =

Cuban artistic gymnast

- Full name: Huber Godoy Olmo
- Born: 29 July 1998 (age 28)

Gymnastics career
- Discipline: Men's artistic gymnastics
- Country represented: Cuba
Medal record
Men's artistic gymnastics
Representing Cuba
Pan American Games
Bronze medal – third place	2019 Lima	Horizontal bar

Huber Godoy Olmo (born 29 July 1998) is a Cuban artistic gymnast.

In 2019, he represented Cuba at the Pan American Games held in Lima, Peru and he won the bronze medal in the men's horizontal bar event.
