= Gymnastics at the 2023 Pan American Games – Women's uneven bars =

Women's uneven bars at the 2023 Pan American Games
- Venue: Training Center for Collective Sport
- Dates: October 24
- Competitors: 8 from 4 nations
- Winning score: 14.666

Medalists
Gold medal	Zoe Miller	United States
Silver medal	Rebeca Andrade	Brazil
Bronze medal	Flávia Saraiva	Brazil

The women's uneven bars gymnastic event at the 2023 Pan American Games was held on October 24 at the Training Center for Collective Sport.

== Results ==
=== Final ===
Rank	Gymnast	D Score	E Score	Pen.	Total
1st place, gold medalist(s)	Zoe Miller (USA)	6.4	8.266		14.666
2nd place, silver medalist(s)	Rebeca Andrade (BRA)	6.1	8.233		14.333
3rd place, bronze medalist(s)	Flávia Saraiva (BRA)	5.6	8.133		13.733
4	Ahtziri Sandoval (MEX)	5.7	7.766		13.466
5	Aurélie Tran (CAN)	5.3	7.800		13.100
6	Ava Stewart (CAN)	5.6	7.500		13.100
7	Jordan Chiles (USA)	5.2	7.200		12.400
8	Paulina Campos (MEX)	5.7	5.700		11.400

=== Qualification ===
Rank	Gymnast	D Score	E Score	Pen.	Total	Qual.
1	Zoe Miller (USA)	6.400	8.366		14.766	Q
2	Rebeca Andrade (BRA)	6.100	8.200		14.300	Q
3	Jordan Chiles (USA)	5.900	8.200		14.100	Q
4	Kayla DiCello (USA)	5.600	8.200		13.800	–
5	Flávia Saraiva (BRA)	5.600	8.033		13.633	Q
6	Katelyn Jong (USA)	5.900	7.733		13.633	–
7	Aurélie Tran (CAN)	5.300	8.100		13.400	Q
8	Ahtziri Sandoval (MEX)	5.500	7.833		13.333	Q
9	Tiana Sumanasekera (USA)	5.300	7.600		12.900	–
10	Paulina Campos (MEX)	5.300	7.300		12.600	Q
11	Ava Stewart (CAN)	5.400	7.000		12.400	Q
12	Natalia Escalera (MEX)	5.700	6.566		12.266	–
13	Frédérique Sgarbossa (CAN)	4.600	7.500		12.100	–
14	Nicole Iribarne (ARG)	4.200	7.800		12.000	R1
15	Tyesha Mattis (JAM)	5.300	6.700		12.000	R2
16	Luisa Blanco (COL)	3.700	8.266		11.966	R3
