= Gymnastics at the 2019 Pan American Games =

- Gymnastics pictograms
- Venue: Polideportivo Villa El Salvador
- Start date: July 27, 2019
- End date: August 5, 2019
- No. of events: 24 (9 men, 15 women)
- Competitors: 195 from 21 nations

Gymnastics competitions at the 2019 Pan American Games in Lima, Peru were held between July 27 and August 5, 2019 at the Polideportivo Villa El Salvador, which also hosted the karate competitions.

The artistic competitions took place between July 27 and 31. The rhythmic competition took place between August 2 and 5. The trampoline competition took place between August 4 and 5.

24 medal events were contested; 14 in artistic gymnastics (eight for men, six for women), eight in rhythmic (all for women), and 2 in trampoline (one per gender). A total of 195 gymnasts competed: 120 in artistic (60 per gender), 51 in rhythmic, and 24 in trampoline (12 per gender).

== Medal summary ==
=== Medal table ===
Rank	Nation	Gold	Silver	Bronze	Total
1	United States	8	11	6	25
2	Brazil	5	5	6	16
3	Canada	5	5	4	14
4	Mexico	4	1	2	7
5	Chile	1	0	0	1
5	Dominican Republic	1	0	0	1
7	Cuba	0	1	3	4
8	Guatemala	0	1	0	1
9	Colombia	0	0	2	2
10	Argentina	0	0	1	1
Totals (10 entries)		24	24	24	72

=== Artistic gymnastics ===
==== Men ====
Games	Gold	Silver	Bronze
Team all-around	Brazil; Francisco Barretto; Arthur Nory; Luís Guilherme Porto; Caio Souza; Arthur Zanetti	United States; Cameron Bock; Grant Breckenridge; Brody Malone; Robert Neff; Genki Suzuki	Canada; Zachary Clay; René Cournoyer; Justin Karstadt; Cory Paterson; Samuel Zakutney
Individual all-around	Caio Souza; Brazil	Arthur Nory; Brazil	Cory Paterson; Canada
Floor exercise	Tomás González; Chile	Robert Neff; United States	Andrés Martínez; Colombia
Pommel horse	Francisco Barretto; Brazil	Robert Neff; United States	Carlos Calvo; Colombia
Rings	Fabián de Luna; Mexico	Arthur Zanetti; Brazil	Federico Molinari; Argentina
Vault	Audrys Nin Reyes; Dominican Republic	Jorge Vega; Guatemala	Alejandro de la Cruz; Cuba
Parallel bars	Isaac Núñez; Mexico	Caio Souza; Brazil	Cameron Bock; United States
Horizontal bar	Francisco Barretto; Brazil	Arthur Nory; Brazil	Huber Godoy; Cuba

==== Women ====
Event	Gold	Silver	Bronze
Team	United States; Kara Eaker; Aleah Finnegan; Morgan Hurd; Riley McCusker; Leanne Wong	Canada; Ellie Black; Brooklyn Moors; Shallon Olsen; Isabela Onyshko; Victoria-Kayen Woo	Brazil; Jade Barbosa; Thaís Fidélis; Lorrane Oliveira; Carolyne Pedro; Flávia Saraiva
Individual all-around	Ellie Black; Canada	Riley McCusker; United States	Flávia Saraiva; Brazil
Vault	Ellie Black; Canada	Yesenia Ferrera; Cuba	Shallon Olsen; Canada
Uneven bars	Riley McCusker; United States	Leanne Wong; United States	Ellie Black; Canada
Balance beam	Kara Eaker; United States	Ellie Black; Canada	Riley McCusker; United States
Floor	Brooklyn Moors; Canada	Kara Eaker; United States	Flávia Saraiva; Brazil

=== Rhythmic gymnastics ===
==== Individual ====
Event	Gold	Silver	Bronze
Individual all-around	Evita Griskenas; United States	Camilla Feeley; United States	Natália Gaudio; Brazil
Ball	Evita Griskenas; United States	Katherine Uchida; Canada	Camilla Feeley; United States
Clubs	Camilla Feeley; United States	Natalie Garcia; Canada	Evita Griskenas; United States
Hoop	Evita Griskenas; United States	Katherine Uchida; Canada	Camilla Feeley; United States
Ribbon	Evita Griskenas; United States	Bárbara Domingos; Brazil	Karla Diaz; Mexico

==== Group ====
Event	Gold	Silver	Bronze
Group all-around	Mexico; Ana Galindo; Adriana Hernández; Mildred Maldonado; Britany Sainz; Karen Villanueva	United States; Isabelle Connor; Yelyzaveta Merenzon; Elizaveta Pletneva; Nicole Sladkov; Kristina Sobolevskaya	Brazil; Vitoria Guerra; Deborah Medrado; Nicole Pircio; Camila Rossi; Beatriz Silva
5 balls	Mexico; Ana Galindo; Adriana Hernández; Mildred Maldonado; Britany Sainz; Karen Villanueva	United States; Isabelle Connor; Yelyzaveta Merenzon; Elizaveta Pletneva; Nicole Sladkov; Kristina Sobolevskaya	Brazil; Vitoria Guerra; Deborah Medrado; Nicole Pircio; Camila Rossi; Beatriz Silva
3 hoops + 4 clubs	Brazil; Vitoria Guerra; Deborah Medrado; Nicole Pircio; Camila Rossi; Beatriz Silva	Mexico; Ana Galindo; Adriana Hernández; Mildred Maldonado; Britany Sainz; Karen Villanueva	Cuba; Claudia Arjona; Melissa Kindelán; Tatiana Frometa; Elaine Rojas; Danay Utria

=== Trampoline ===
Event	Gold	Silver	Bronze
Men's individual	Jérémy Chartier; Canada	Jeffrey Gluckstein; United States	Ruben Padilla; United States
Women's individual	Samantha Smith; Canada	Nicole Ahsinger; United States	Dafne Navarro; Mexico

== Qualification ==
A total of 184 gymnasts are allowed to compete (114 in artistic, 46 in rhythmic and 24 in trampoline). A nation may enter a maximum of 21 athletes across all disciplines (five in each gender for artistic, five athletes in rhythmic group, two in individual and two in each trampoline event). All qualification was done via the 2018 Pan American Gymnastics Championships.

== See also ==
- Gymnastics at the 2020 Summer Olympics
