= 2018 Pacific Rim Gymnastics Championships =

- Venues: Coliseo Iván de Bedout
- Location: Medellín, Colombia
- Dates: April 27–29, 2018

The 2018 Pacific Rim Gymnastics Championships is the fifteenth edition of the Pacific Rim Gymnastics Championships. The competition was held on April 27–29, 2018 at the Coliseo Iván de Bedout in Medellín, Colombia.

== Background ==
The 2018 edition of the Pacific Rim Championships took place in Medellín, Colombia from April 27 - 29.

== Venues ==
The Pacific Rim Championships took place at Coliseo Iván de Bedout.

== Broadcast ==
FloGymnastics broadcast the event.

== Participating nations ==
These nations participated in the competition:

- Argentina
- Australia
- Canada
- Chile
- Chinese Taipei
- Colombia
- Costa Rica
- Cuba
- Ecuador
- Hong Kong
- Mexico
- Japan
- Mexico
- New Zealand
- Panama
- Peru
- United States

== Medalists ==
=== Artistic gymnastics ===
==== Men's events ====
Event	Gold	Silver	Bronze
Team	United States; Sam Mikulak; Akash Modi; Marvin Kimble; Lazarus Barnhill; Asher Hong; Justin Ah Chow	Canada; Chris Kaji; Joel Gagnon; William Émard; David Sandro; Evgeny Siminiuc; Félix Dolci	Colombia; Carlos Calvo; Andrés Martínez; Erick Vargas; Sergio Vargas; Jefferson Medina; Marcos Aguilar
Senior
All-Around	Sam Mikulak (USA)	Akash Modi (USA)	Carlos Calvo (COL)
Floor exercise	Akash Modi (USA)	Sam Mikulak (USA)	Lee Chih-kai (TPE)
Pommel Horse	Marvin Kimble (USA)	Lee Chih-kai (TPE)	Carlos Calvo (COL)
Rings	Sam Mikulak (USA)	Akash Modi (USA)	Chris Kaji (CAN)
Vault	Lee Chih-kai (TPE)	Daniel Agüero (PER)	Tseng Wei-sheng (TPE)
Parallel Bars	Akash Modi (USA)	Sam Mikulak (USA)	Andrés Martínez (COL)
Horizontal Bar	Sam Mikulak (USA)	Israel Chiriboga (ECU)	Carlos Calvo (COL)
Junior
All-Around	Lazarus Barnhill (USA)	Asher Hong (USA)	David Sandro (CAN)
Floor exercise	Lazarus Barnhill (USA)	Asher Hong (USA)	David Sandro (CAN)
Pommel Horse	Asher Hong (USA)	Jorge Perez (MEX)	David Sandro (CAN)
Rings	Sam Dick (NZL)	Félix Dolci (CAN)	Asher Hong (USA)
Vault	Justin Ah Chow (USA)	Lazarus Barnhill (USA)	David Sandro (CAN)
Parallel Bars	Justin Ah Chow (USA)	Evgeny Siminiuc (CAN)	Asher Hong (USA)
Horizontal Bar	David Sandro (CAN)	Lazarus Barnhill (USA)	Jesse Moore (AUS)

==== Women's events ====
Event	Gold	Silver	Bronze
Team	United States; Grace McCallum; Morgan Hurd; Jordan Chiles; Jordan Bowers; Kayla DiCello; Sunisa Lee	Canada; Haley de Jong; Sophie Marois; Victoria Woo; Zoé Allaire-Bourgie; Emma Spence; Imogen Patterson	Australia; Talia Folino; Kate McDonald; Miriana Perkins; Elena Chipizubov; Sidney Stephens; Kate Sayer
Senior
All-Around	Grace McCallum (USA)	Morgan Hurd (USA)	Haley de Jong (CAN)
Vault	Jordan Chiles (USA)	Grace McCallum (USA)	Sophie Marois (CAN)
Uneven Bars	Haley de Jong (CAN)	Jimena Moreno (MEX)	Kate McDonald (AUS)
Balance Beam	Talia Folino (AUS)	Paulina Campos (MEX)	Jordan Chiles (USA)
Floor exercise	Jordan Chiles (USA)	Grace McCallum (USA)	Haley de Jong (CAN)
Junior
All-Around	Jordan Bowers (USA)	Kayla DiCello (USA)	Zoé Allaire-Bourgie (CAN)
Vault	Kayla DiCello (USA)	Sunisa Lee (USA)	Imogen Patterson (CAN)
Uneven Bars	Kayla DiCello (USA)	Zoé Allaire-Bourgie (CAN)	Jordan Bowers (USA)
Balance Beam	Zoé Allaire-Bourgie (CAN)	Sunisa Lee (USA)	Kate Sayer (AUS)
Floor exercise	Jordan Bowers (USA)	Sunisa Lee (USA)	Zoé Allaire-Bourgie (CAN)

Notes

Gymnasts from Cuba and Argentina were not eligible to win medals given they are not members of the Pacific Alliance of National Gymnastic Federations.

=== Rhythmic gymnastics ===
Event	Gold	Silver	Bronze
Team	United States; Camilla Feeley; Heather Chan; Elizabeth Kapitonova; Shannon Xiao; Lennox Hopkins Wilikins; Matylda Marszalek; Ellen Peng; Vianna Ngo; June Kim; Alexandra Militeeva; Valerie Militeeva; Anastasiya Ivanova	Canada; Athena Tsaltas; Jaedyn Andreotti; Michel Vivier; Natalie Garcia; Haley Miller; Izabella Helbin; Michelle Pik; Martha Litvikov; Victoria Smolianova; Leonella Rudiy; Tiffany Zhao	Colombia; Lina Dussan; Vanessa Galindo; Mariana Sanchez; Jenifer Rivera; Luz Adriana Molina; Luna Henao
Senior
All-Around	Camilla Feeley (USA)	Heather Chan (USA)	Lina Dussan (COL)
Hoop	Camilla Feeley (USA)	Jaedyn Andreotti (CAN)	Vanessa Galindo (COL)
Ball	Camilla Feeley (USA)	Heather Chan (USA)	Lina Dussan (COL)
Clubs	Camilla Feeley (USA)	Heather Chan (USA)	Lina Dussan (COL)
Ribbon	Camilla Feeley (USA)	Heather Chan (USA)	Lina Dussan (COL)
Junior
All-Around	Elizabeth Kapitanova (USA)	Shannon Xiao (USA)	Michel Vivier (CAN)
Hoop	Elizabeth Kapitanova (USA)	Michel Vivier (CAN)	Natalie Garcia (CAN)
Ball	Elizabeth Kapitanova (USA)	Shannon Xiao (USA)	Natalie Garcia (CAN)
Clubs	Elizabeth Kapitanova (USA)	Natalie Garcia (CAN)	Michel Vivier (CAN)
Ribbon	Elizabeth Kapitanova (USA)	Shannon Xiao (USA)	Michel Vivier (CAN)
Junior Groups
All-Around	Ellen Peng (USA); Vianna Ngo (USA); June Kim (USA); Alexandra Militeeva (USA); Valerie Militeeva (USA); Anastasiya Ivanova (USA)	Annalena Ley (CHI); Antonia Herrera (CHI); Martina Quintraman (CHI); Martina Rute (CHI); Martina Valdes (CHI); Josefina Romero (CHI)	Michelle Pik (CAN); Martha Litvikov (CAN); Victoria Smolianova (CAN); Leonella Rudiy (CAN); Tiffany Zhao (CAN)
Rope	Ellen Peng (USA); Vianna Ngo (USA); June Kim (USA); Alexandra Militeeva (USA); Valerie Militeeva (USA); Anastasiya Ivanova (USA)	Annalena Ley (CHI); Antonia Herrera (CHI); Martina Quintraman (CHI); Martina Rute (CHI); Martina Valdes (CHI); Josefina Romero (CHI)	Michelle Pik (CAN); Martha Litvikov (CAN); Victoria Smolianova (CAN); Leonella Rudiy (CAN); Tiffany Zhao (CAN)
Clubs	Ellen Peng (USA); Vianna Ngo (USA); June Kim (USA); Alexandra Militeeva (USA); Valerie Militeeva (USA); Anastasiya Ivanova (USA)	Annalena Ley (CHI); Antonia Herrera (CHI); Martina Quintraman (CHI); Martina Rute (CHI); Martina Valdes (CHI); Josefina Romero (CHI)	Michelle Pik (CAN); Martha Litvikov (CAN); Victoria Smolianova (CAN); Leonella Rudiy (CAN); Tiffany Zhao (CAN)

=== Trampoline ===
Event	Gold	Silver	Bronze
Men's team	Japan; Yasuhiro Ueyama; Ryohei Taniguchi; Ryusei Nishioka; Motoki Nakayama	United States; Isaac Rowley; Nicholas Steward; Zachary Ramacci; Logan Gilbert	Australia; Aiden Thomas; Ty Swadling; Liam Christie; Patrick Shulter
Women's team	Japan; Rana Nakano; Reina Satake; Saki Tanaka; Ena Sakurai	United States; Jessica Stevens; Sydney Senter; Miah Bruns	Mexico; Dafne Carolina Navarro; Melissa Guadalupe Flores; Beatriz Ayelen Segundo; Carolina Peregrina Garcia
Senior
Men's individual	Yasuhiro Ueyama (JPN)	Ángel Hernández (COL)	Ryohei Taniguchi (JPN)
Women's individual	Rana Nakano (JPN)	Reina Satake (JPN)	Dafne Carolina Navarro (MEX)
Men's synchro	Yasuhiro Ueyama (JPN); Ryohei Taniguchi (JPN)	Aiden Thomas (AUS); Ty Swadling (AUS)	Jacob Cranham (CAN); Andrew Martin (CAN)
Women's synchro	Reina Satake (JPN); Rana Nakano (JPN)	Laurence Roux (CAN); Kalena Soehn (CAN)	Katish Hernández (COL); Angie Peña (COL)
Junior
Men's individual	Logan Gilbert (USA)	Victor Ezequiel Rodriguez (MEX)	Ryusei Nishioka (JPN)
Women's individual	Saki Tanaka (JPN)	Britney Glazebrook (AUS)	Sydney Senter (USA)
Men's synchro	Logan Gilbert (USA); Zachary Ramacci (USA)	Ryusei Nishioka (JPN); Motoki Nakayama (JPN)	Victor Ezequiel Rodriguez (MEX); Kristian Alejandro Cueva (MEX)
Women's synchro	Saki Tanaka (JPN); Ena Sakurai (JPN)	Jessica Pickering (AUS); Britney Glazebrook (AUS)	Sydney Senter (USA); Miah Bruns (USA)

== Medal table ==
Rank	Nation	Gold	Silver	Bronze	Total
1	United States	36	24	6	66
2	Japan	8	2	2	12
3	Canada	3	10	20	33
4	Australia	1	3	5	9
5	Chinese Taipei	1	1	2	4
6	New Zealand	1	0	0	1
7	Mexico	0	4	3	7
8	Chile	0	3	0	3
9	Colombia	0	1	12	13
10	Ecuador	0	1	0	1
10	Peru	0	1	0	1
Totals (11 entries)		50	50	50	150
