= Fabián de Luna =

Mexican artistic gymnast (born 1996)

- Born: 23 September 1996 (age 29)

Gymnastics career
- Discipline: Men's artistic gymnastics
- Country represented: Mexico
Medal record
Representing Mexico
Pan American Games
Gold medal – first place	2019 Lima	Rings
Pan American Championships
Gold medal – first place	2018 Lima	Rings
Silver medal – second place	2021 Rio de Janeiro	Vault
Central American and Caribbean Games
Gold medal – first place	2023 San Salvador	Team
Silver medal – second place	2018 Barranquilla	Rings
Bronze medal – third place	2018 Barranquilla	Team
Bronze medal – third place	2023 San Salvador	Vault

Fabián de Luna (born 23 September 1996) is a Mexican artistic gymnast.

Born in Chicago to a Mexican father and an American mother, he represents Mexico at the international level.

In 2018, he won the gold medal in the rings event at the 2018 Pan American Gymnastics Championships held in Lima, Peru.

In 2019, he represented Mexico at the 2019 Pan American Games held in Lima, Peru and he won the gold medal in the men's rings event.
