= Genki Suzuki =

American artistic gymnast

- Full name: Genki Suzuki
- Born: February 24, 1997 (age 29) Okinawa, Japan
- Height: 5 ft 6 in (168 cm)

Gymnastics career
- Discipline: Men's artistic gymnastics
- Country represented: United States (2018–2019, 2021)
- College team: Oklahoma Sooners
- Head coach: Mark Williams
Medal record
Men's artistic gymnastics
Representing United States
Event	1st	2nd	3rd
Pan American Games	0	1	0
Pan American Championships	2	0	0
Total	2	1	0
Pan American Games
Silver medal – second place	2019 Lima	Team
Pan American Championships
Gold medal – first place	2018 Lima	Team
Gold medal – first place	2018 Lima	Pommel horse

Genki Suzuki (born February 24, 1997) is an American artistic gymnast and coach. He is a former member of the United States men's national artistic gymnastics team.

== Early life and education ==
Suzuki was born on February 24, 1997, in Okinawa, Japan, to Yoko and Yoshikazu Suzuki. He moved to the United States with his family when he was eight years old. He lived in Ann Arbor, Michigan and Iowa City, Iowa before settling in North Wales, Pennsylvania. As a teen, he was able to obtain his green card. He attended Wissahickon High School and later enrolled at the University of Oklahoma to pursue gymnastics.

== Gymnastics career ==
Suzuki, despite possessing a green card, was unable to compete in the USA Gymnastics National Championships which blocked his path from also representing the United States in international competition. Once he became a citizen in April 2018, he competed in the 2018 U.S. National Gymnastics Championships and was named to the United States national team shortly afterward. His first international assignment was at the 2018 Pan American Gymnastics Championships where he won two gold medals, one for the pommel horse and one for the team all-around. He later represented the United States at the 2019 Pan American Games held in Lima, Peru and he won a silver medal in the team event. He also won the silver medal both in the floor exercise and in the men's artistic team all-around event.

Domestically, Suzuki competed for the Oklahoma Sooners men's gymnastics team. The team won the 2016, 2017, and 2018 NCAA men's gymnastics championships with a second-place finish in 2019. He also was the 2021 Winter Cup horizontal bar champion.

== Coaching career ==
He is currently an assistant coach with Oklahoma.
