= Gabrielle da Silva =

Brazilian rhythmic gymnast

Gabrielle Moraes Da Silva
- Full name: Gabrielle Moraes Da Silva
- Born: 4 March 1997 (age 29)

Gymnastics career
- Discipline: Rhythmic gymnastics
- Country represented: Brazil (2014)
- Head coach: Camila Ferezin
Medal record
Rhythmic gymnastics
Representing Brazil
Event	1st	2nd	3rd
FIG World Cup	0	0	1
Total	0	0	1
Pan American Championships
Gold medal – first place	2014 Mississauga	Group All-around
Gold medal – first place	2014 Mississauga	10 clubs
Gold medal – first place	2014 Mississauga	3 balls + 2 ribbons
Gold medal – first place	2018 Lima	5 hoops
Gold medal – first place	2021 Rio de Janeiro	Group All-around
Gold medal – first place	2021 Rio de Janeiro	5 balls
Gold medal – first place	2021 Rio de Janeiro	3 hoops + 4 clubs
Bronze medal – third place	2018 Lima	Group All-around
Bronze medal – third place	2018 Lima	3 balls + 2 ropes
Gold medal – first place	2022 Rio de Janeiro	Group All-around
Gold medal – first place	2022 Rio de Janeiro	5 hoops
Silver medal – second place	2022 Rio de Janeiro	3 ribbons + 2 balls
South American Games
Gold medal – first place	2018 Cochabamba	Group All-around
Gold medal – first place	2018 Cochabamba	5 hoops
Gold medal – first place	2018 Cochabamba	3 balls + 2 ropes

Gabrielle Moraes Da Silva (born 4 March 1997) is a Brazilian group rhythmic gymnast. She represents her nation at international competitions. She competed at world championships, including at the 2014 World Rhythmic Gymnastics Championships.

In 2013, Gabrielle da Silva and the other members of the Brazilian group — Beatriz Pomini, Bianca Mendonça, Debora Falda, Francielly Pereira and Eliane Sampaio — earned the bronze medal on the 3 balls + 2 ribbons routine at the Minsk stage of the 2013 Rhythmic Gymnastics World Cup Series. This was not only Brazil's but also Latin America's first medal at the Rhythmic Gymnastics World Cup series, and only the second time a country from the Americas earned a medal at the World Cup, after Canada's Mary Fuzesi earned the bronze medal on ribbon at the 1990 FIG World Cup Final.

== See also ==
- List of Olympic rhythmic gymnasts for Brazil
