= Flávia Saraiva =

Brazilian artistic gymnast

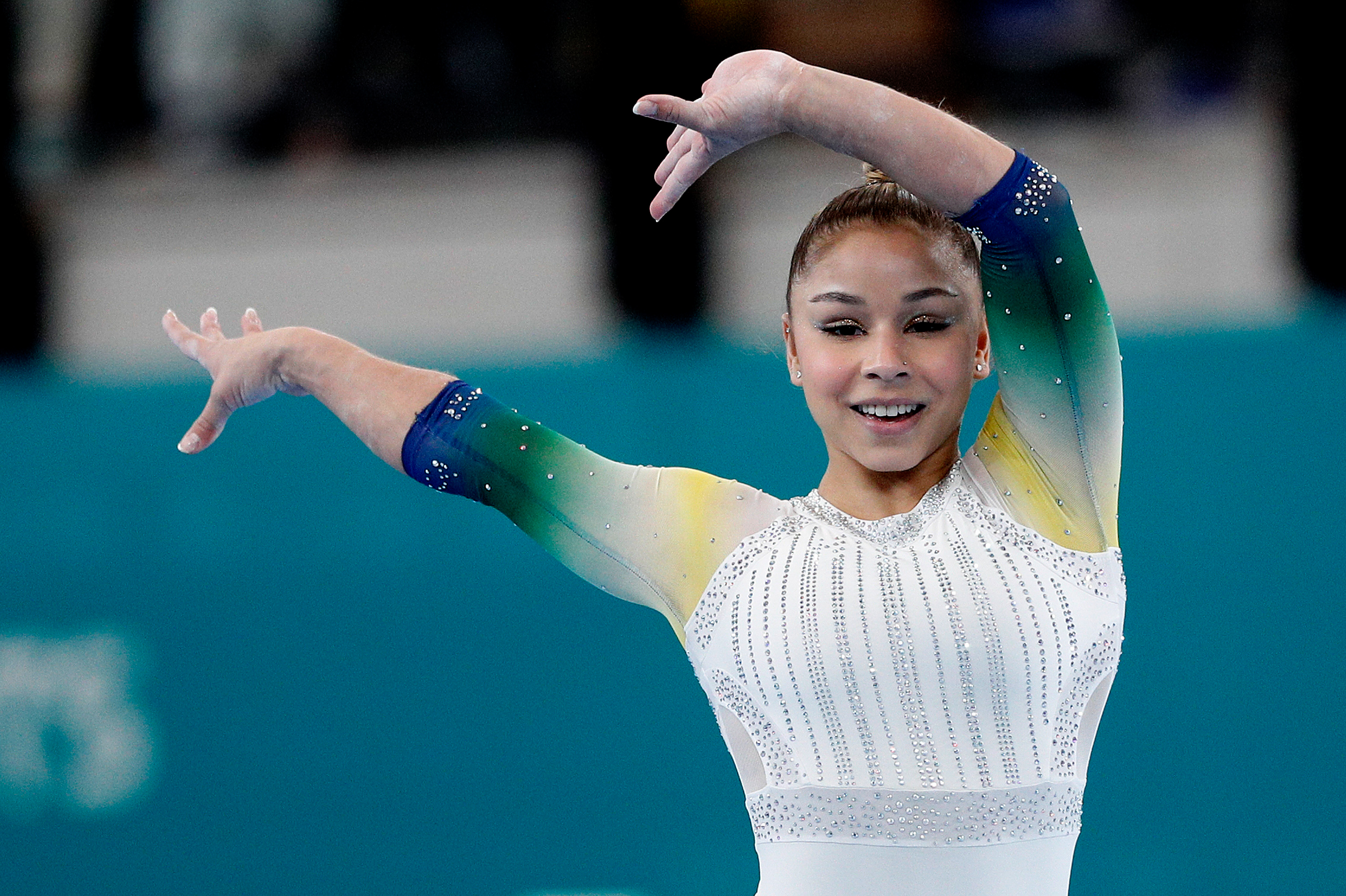
- Saraiva in 2023

Personal information
- Full name: Flávia Lopes Saraiva
- Nicknames: Flavinha, Sininho
- Born: 30 September 1999 (age 27) Rio de Janeiro, Brazil
- Height: 1.42 m (4 ft 8 in)

Gymnastics career
- Discipline: Women's artistic gymnastics
- Country represented: Brazil; (2012–present)
- Club: Flamengo
- Head coach: Francisco Porath Neto
- Assistant coach: Juliana Fajardo
- Former coach: Alexandre Carvalho
Medal record
Representing Brazil
Women's artistic gymnastics
Event	1st	2nd	3rd
Olympic Games	0	0	1
World Championships	0	1	2
Youth Olympic Games	1	2	0
Pan American Games	0	4	6
Pan American Championships	3	4	1
Total	4	11	10
Olympic Games
Bronze medal – third place	2024 Paris	Team
World Championships
Silver medal – second place	2023 Antwerp	Team
Bronze medal – third place	2023 Antwerp	Floor exercise
Bronze medal – third place	2026 Rotterdam	Balance beam
Pan American Games
Silver medal – second place	2023 Santiago	Team
Silver medal – second place	2023 Santiago	All-Around
Silver medal – second place	2023 Santiago	Balance beam
Silver medal – second place	2023 Santiago	Floor exercise
Bronze medal – third place	2015 Toronto	Team
Bronze medal – third place	2015 Toronto	All-around
Bronze medal – third place	2019 Lima	Team
Bronze medal – third place	2019 Lima	All-around
Bronze medal – third place	2019 Lima	Floor exercise
Bronze medal – third place	2023 Santiago	Uneven bars
Pan American Championships
Gold medal – first place	2022 Rio de Janeiro	Team
Gold medal – first place	2022 Rio de Janeiro	All-around
Gold medal – first place	2022 Rio de Janeiro	Balance beam
Silver medal – second place	2018 Lima	Team
Silver medal – second place	2018 Lima	Balance beam
Silver medal – second place	2018 Lima	Floor exercise
Silver medal – second place	2022 Rio de Janeiro	Floor exercise
Bronze medal – third place	2018 Lima	All-around
South American Games
Gold medal – first place	2018 Cochabamba	Team
Gold medal – first place	2018 Cochabamba	Uneven bars
Gold medal – first place	2018 Cochabamba	Balance beam
Silver medal – second place	2018 Cochabamba	All-around
Youth Olympic Games
Gold medal – first place	2014 Nanjing	Floor exercise
Silver medal – second place	2014 Nanjing	All-around
Silver medal – second place	2014 Nanjing	Balance beam
FIG World Cup
Event	1st	2nd	3rd
World Cup	1	1	0
World Challenge Cup	8	4	3
Total	9	5	3

Flávia Lopes Saraiva (born 30 September 1999) is a Brazilian artistic gymnast. She represented Brazil at the 2014 Summer Youth Olympics in Nanjing, the 2016 Summer Olympics in Rio, the 2020 Summer Olympics in Tokyo, and the 2024 Summer Olympics in Paris where she won a bronze medal as part of the Brazilian team. She was also part of the teams that won silver at the 2023 World Championships, gold at the 2018 South American Games and bronze at the 2015 and 2019 Pan American Games. Individually she is the 2014 Summer Youth Olympic floor exercise champion, the 2023 World floor bronze medalist, the 2026 World beam bronze medallist, and she is a multi-medalist at the Pan American Games, South American Games, and Pan American Championships.

== Gymnastics career ==
=== 2013 ===
Saraiva's first international competition was the Houston National Invitational, where she finished 10th in the all-around competition. In August she competed at the Junior South American Championships in Sogamoso, Colombia where she helped Brazil place first as a team. Individually she tied for gold in the all-around alongside Lorrane Oliveira, and won gold on balance beam and silver on floor exercise.

In December Saraiva competed at the 2013 Gymnasiade in her own country, where she helped her team win silver. Individually, she won gold on floor exercise and balance beam and placed sixth on the uneven bars.

=== 2014 ===
Saraiva started her 2014 season by competing at the WOGA Classic in Plano, Texas. She placed first on balance beam, second with her team, and fifth in the all-around. In March, she competed at the Junior Pan American Championships, a qualifier meet for the Youth Olympic Games. There she had an outstanding meet, as she placed first in the all-around and on floor, second with the team, and third on bars and beam. In August, she was crowned Brazilian National Junior Champion and added a bronze on beam to her medal haul. She replaced injured teammate Rebeca Andrade and competed at the 2014 Youth Olympic Games. She qualified to the all-around, balance beam, and floor exercise finals, where she medaled on all of them, winning silver in the all-around and on balance beam and gold on floor exercise.

=== 2015 ===
Saraiva made her senior international debut at the FIG World Challenge Cup in São Paulo. She won the floor exercise and got the silver medal on balance beam behind China's Shang Chunsong.

At the Pan American Games, she took the bronze medal in the all-around behind Canada's Ellie Black and USA's Madison Desch. In the team competition, Brazil took bronze behind the US and Canada.

=== 2016 ===
Saraiva represented Brazil at the 2016 Rio Olympic Games. She helped the team qualify 5th into the team finals and individually qualified in 19th and 3rd into the individual all-around and balance beam finals, respectively. In the team final, Brazil placed 8th. Although she had originally qualified for the all-around final, she was replaced by Jade Barbosa so she could focus on the beam final. In the balance beam final, Flavia was last to compete. After having several big wobbles, she placed 5th behind Marine Boyer of France (4th) and Simone Biles of the USA (3rd).

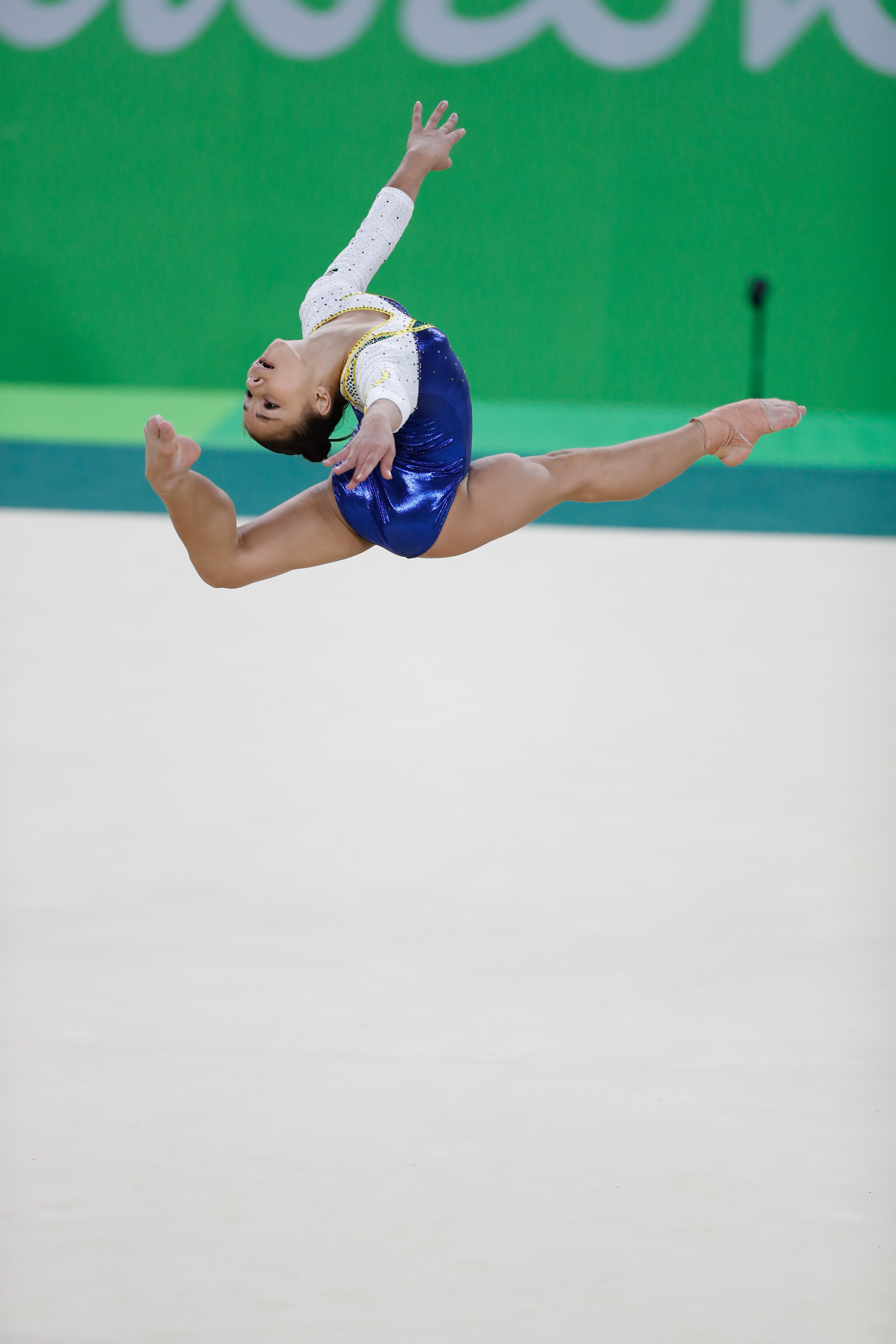
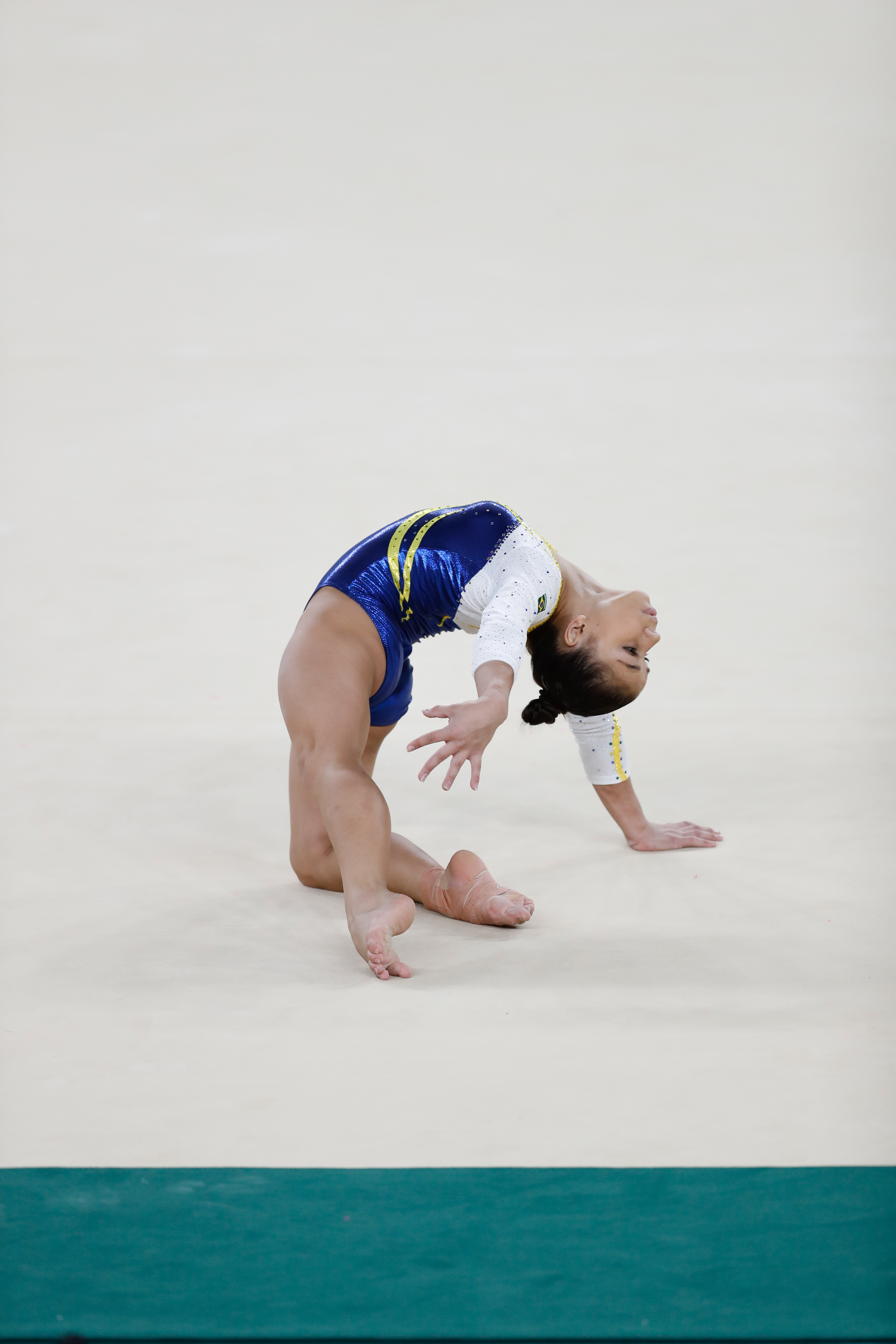
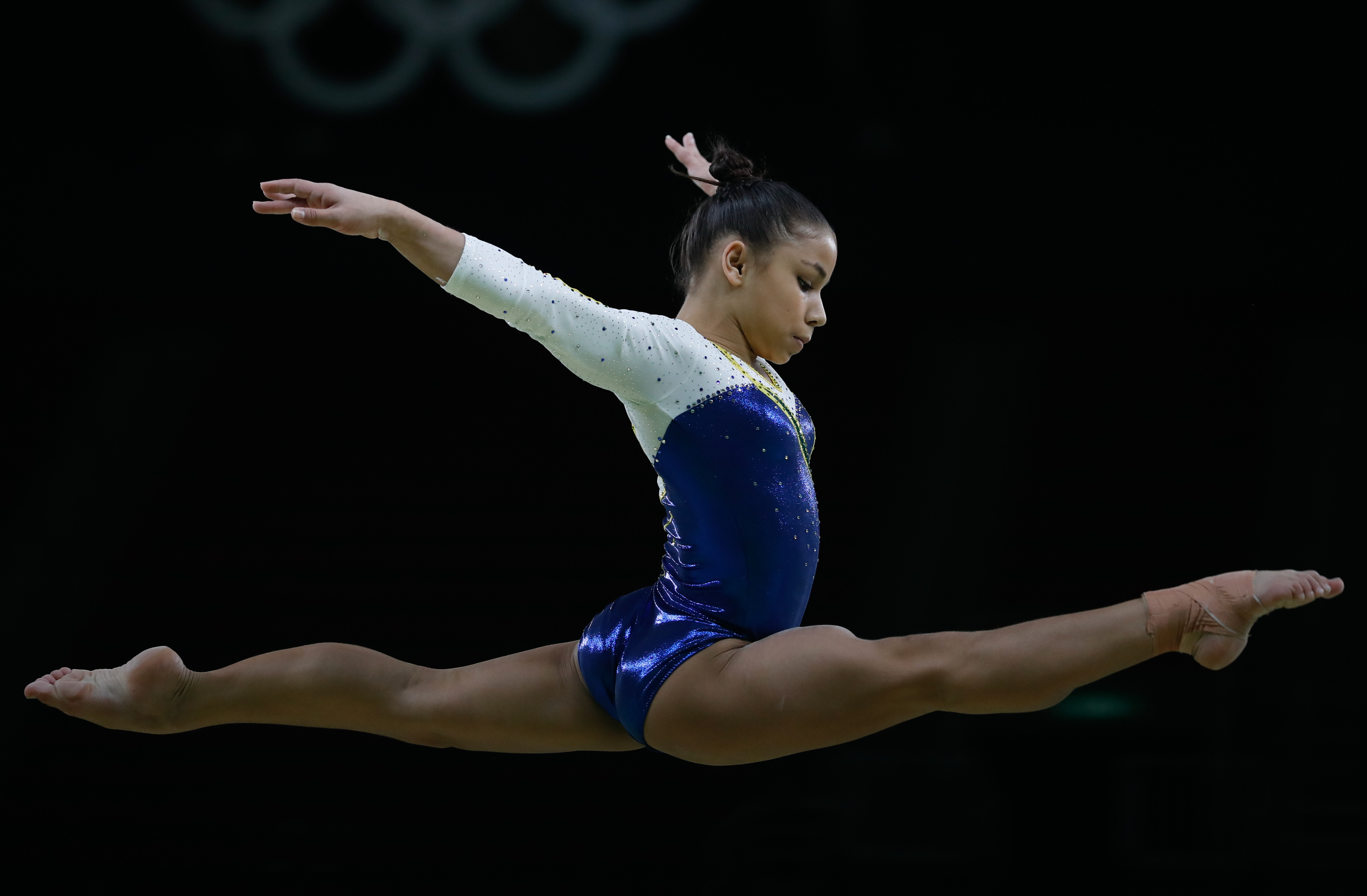
Saraiva at the 2016 Summer Olympics

=== 2017 ===
In 2017 Saraiva competed at the City of Jesolo Trophy, where she helped Brazil finish second behind the United States. Individually she placed fifth in the all-around, second on balance beam behind Riley McCusker of the United States, and was co-champion on floor exercise alongside Abby Paulson of the United States. In May she competed at the Koper Challenge Cup where she placed third on uneven bars behind Larisa Iordache of Romania and Ellie Black of Canada and placed fourth on balance beam and eighth on floor exercise after not being able to finish her routine due to an injury sustained during the balance beam final. The following week she competed at the Osijek Challenge Cup where she won silver on floor exercise behind compatriot Thais Fidelis, bronze on balance beam behind Fidelis and Anastasia Ilyankova of Russia, and placed fourth on uneven bars. In August, Saraiva suffered from a spinal injury and was out for the remainder of the season.

=== 2018 ===
In April, Saraiva competed at the City of Jesolo Trophy, where she helped Brazil win the silver medal behind Russia. Individually she placed eighth in the all-around and second on floor exercise behind Emma Malabuyo of the United States. The following month she competed at the 2018 South American Games where she helped Brazil win gold in the team final. Individually, she placed second in the all-around behind Martina Dominici of Argentina and won gold on uneven bars and balance beam. In June Saraiva placed fourth at the Brazilian Championships, finishing behind Daniele Hypólito, Jade Barbosa, and Thais Fidelis. The following month she competed at the Brazilian Event Championships where she placed first on balance beam and second on floor exercise behind Fidelis.

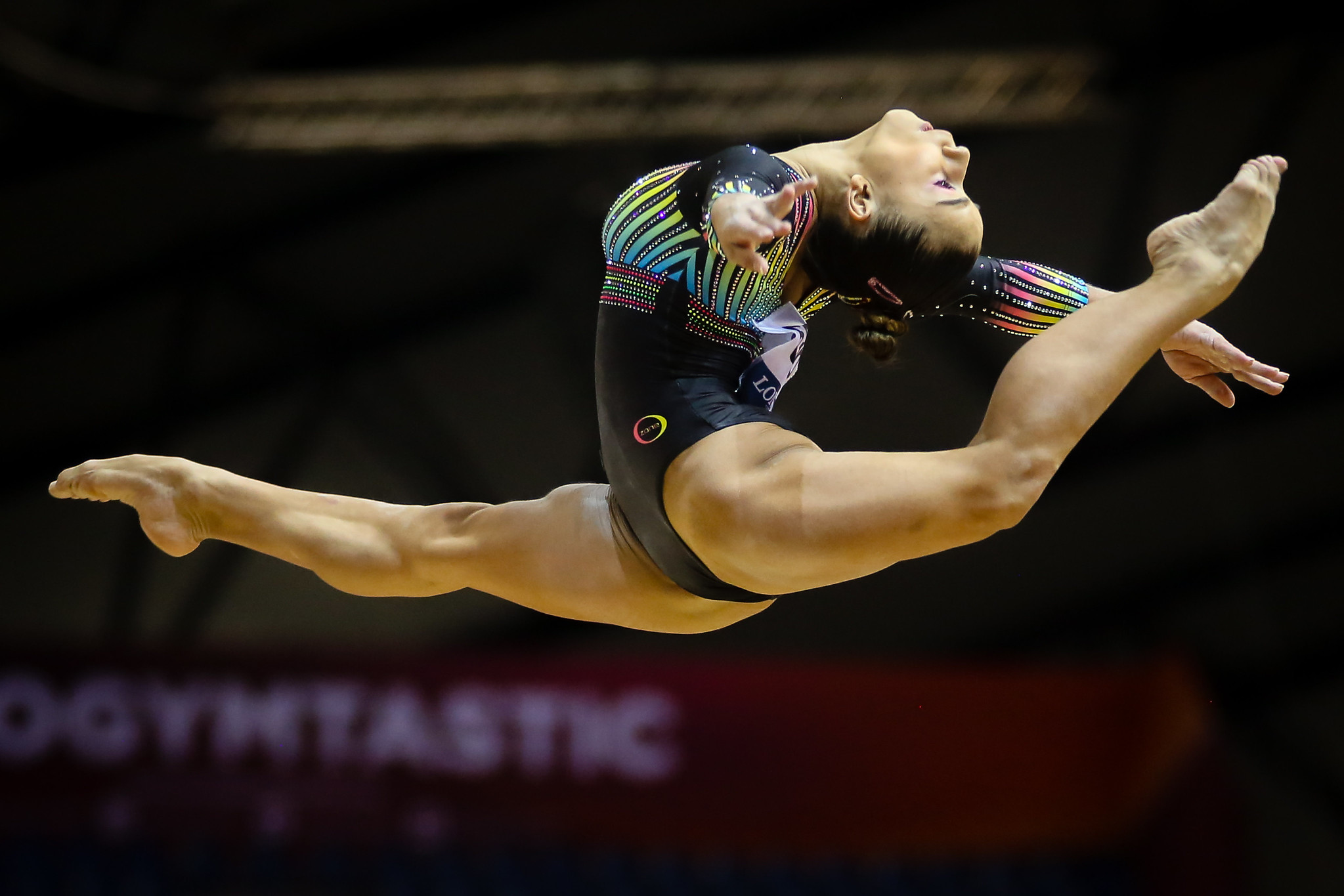
Saraiva competing at the 2018 World Championships

In August, she was selected for the team to compete at the 2018 Pan American Championships alongside Jade Barbosa, Rebeca Andrade, Thais Fidelis, and Lorrane Oliveira. She won a silver with the Brazilian team and one on floor exercise and beam. She also won a bronze in the all-around. She was later selected for the team to compete at the 2018 World Championships in Doha, Qatar. There she qualified for the individual all-around final in 10th place and the floor final in 5th. The Brazilian team qualified for the team final in 5th. After several mistakes on the uneven bars, Brazil finished in 7th place. After a fall on the balance beam in the all-around final, she finished in 8th place. She placed fifth on floor exercise after she had a step out of bounds.

In November, Saraiva competed at the Arthur Gander Memorial in Chiasso, Switzerland, where she placed second in the three-event all-around behind Barbosa. A few days later, she competed at the Swiss Cup in Zürich alongside Arthur Mariano, where they placed sixth in qualifications. Saraiva ended the season competing at the Cottbus World Cup where she placed first on floor exercise and second on balance beam behind teammate Andrade.

=== 2019 ===
Saraiva began the season competing at the DTB Team Challenge in Stuttgart, Germany, where Brazil won the gold medal ahead of second-place Russia. Individually, she placed fourth in the all-around behind compatriot Rebeca Andrade, Russian Angelina Melnikova, and Eythora Thorsdottir of the Netherlands. In June, she competed at the Brazilian Championships where she placed second in the all-around behind Thais Fidelis, second on uneven bars behind Lorrane Oliveira, and first on balance beam.

In July, Saraiva was named to the team to compete at the Pan American Games alongside Jade Barbosa, Thais Fidelis, Lorrane Oliveira, and Carolyne Pedro. Together the team won bronze in the team final. Individually, Saraiva won bronze in the all-around behind Ellie Black of Canada and Riley McCusker of the United States and won bronze on floor exercise behind Brooklyn Moors of Canada and Kara Eaker of the United States. She also placed fifth on balance beam after falling off the apparatus.

In October, Saraiva competed at the 2019 World Championships. Brazil finished in 14th place in team qualifications and did not advance to the team final or the 2020 Olympic Games. Saraiva, however, finished the all-around qualification in tenth place and therefore qualified as an individual to the 2020 Olympics in Tokyo. She also qualified for the balance beam and floor exercise event finals. During the all-around final, she finished in seventh place. During event finals, she finished sixth on balance beam and fourth on floor exercise.

=== 2020 ===
In July, Saraiva and numerous other Brazilian Olympic hopefuls traveled to Portugal as they were unable to resume training due to the COVID-19 pandemic in Brazil remaining unstable and gyms remaining closed.

=== 2021 ===
At the 2020 Olympic Games, Saraiva injured her ankle on her last tumbling pass on floor during qualifications, thus performing only on floor and balance beam. However, the gymnast was able to qualify for the balance beam event final and, despite the injury, her routine led her to finish 7th.

=== 2022 ===
In July, Saraiva was named to the team for the 2022 Pan American Championships alongside Rebeca Andrade, Christal Bezerra, Lorrane Oliveira, Carolyne Pedro, and Júlia Soares. Together, they won gold in the team final. Individually, Saraiva won gold in the all-around final ahead of Lexi Zeiss and Skye Blakely, gold on balance beam and silver on floor exercise. In September Saraiva competed at the Paris World Challenge Cup. She finished fifth on floor exercise.

Saraiva competed at the World Championships alongside Andrade, Pedro, Soares, and Oliveira. During qualifications, Saraiva suffered an ankle injury on vault but still managed to qualify to the all-around final in tenth place and the floor exercise final in first place. During the team final, Saraiva only competed on uneven bars and helped Brazil finish fourth as a team. Due to the injury, Saraiva withdrew from all individual finals.

=== 2023 ===
In September, Saraiva competed at the Paris World Challenge Cup, where she took the bronze medal in the balance beam final behind Marine Boyer and Kaylia Nemour. She next competed at the World Championships along with teammates Rebeca Andrade, Jade Barbosa, Lorrane Oliveira and Júlia Soares. The team took the silver medal behind the United States — Brazil's first team medal in World Championship history. Individually, Saraiva finished fifteenth in the all-around final and took the bronze medal in the floor final behind Simone Biles and Andrade. After the World Championships, Saraiva competed at the Pan American Games, where the Brazilian team once again took silver behind the United States. Additionally, she won individual silver medals in the all-around, balance beam and floor exercise finals, as well as a bronze on the uneven bars.

=== 2024 ===
Saraiva began the year competing at the Antalya World Challenge Cup where she won silver on balance beam behind Sun Xinyi of China. She next competed at the City of Jesolo Trophy where she helped Brazil finish second as a team behind Italy. Individually, she won gold on balance beam and floor exercise. Saraiva was named to the team to represent Brazil at the 2024 Summer Olympics alongside Rebeca Andrade, Jade Barbosa, Lorrane Oliveira, and Julia Soares. At the 2024 Olympic Games, Saraiva helped Brazil qualify to the team final in fourth place, and individually she qualified to the all-around final. While warming up for the team final, Saraiva suffered a fall off the uneven bars that resulted in her knee and eye colliding. After being attended to by the medical staff, Saraiva returned with her right eye bandaged and significantly bruised. Despite the injury, Saraiva competed on all four apparatuses, helping Brazil win the bronze medal behind the United States and Italy. This was the first ever Olympic team medal for Brazil. During the all-around final she placed ninth.

=== 2025 ===
In September, Saraiva competed at the Szombathely World Challenge Cup, performing on balance beam. She qualified for the event final and took the gold medal with a score of 13.800.

Saraiva represented Brazil at the 2025 World Gymnastics Championships in Jakarta, Indonesia, along with teammates Julia Coutinho, Sophia Weisberg, and Julia Soares. She competed on balance beam and floor exercise during the qualification round, qualifying for the balance beam final. In the final, she received a score of 13.900, finishing in fourth place.

=== 2026 ===
In October she competed at the 2026 World Championships with the Brazilian team alongside Rebeca Andrade, Lorrane Oliveira, Thais Fidelis and Sophia Weisberg. During the team final she contributed scores on all 4 apparatuses, and Brazil ended up taking the fifth place. Individually she qualified for the all-round and the beam final. In the all round final she ended up twelfth, and on beam she won the bronze medal, after Kaylia Nemour and Zhang Qingying..

== Competitive history ==
Year	Event	Team	AA	VT	UB	BB	FX
Junior
2013	Houston Invitational		10				
2013	South American Junior Championships	1st place, gold medalist(s)	1st place, gold medalist(s)			1st place, gold medalist(s)	2nd place, silver medalist(s)
2013	Gymnasiade	2nd place, silver medalist(s)	2nd place, silver medalist(s)		6	1st place, gold medalist(s)	1st place, gold medalist(s)
2014
2014	WOGA Classic		5		13	1st place, gold medalist(s)	4
2014	Pan American Championships	2nd place, silver medalist(s)	1st place, gold medalist(s)		3rd place, bronze medalist(s)	3rd place, bronze medalist(s)	1st place, gold medalist(s)
2014	Youth Olympic Games		2nd place, silver medalist(s)			2nd place, silver medalist(s)	1st place, gold medalist(s)
Senior
2015
2015	Pan American Games	3rd place, bronze medalist(s)	3rd place, bronze medalist(s)				
2015	São Paulo World Challenge Cup					2nd place, silver medalist(s)	1st place, gold medalist(s)
2015	FIT Challenge	3rd place, bronze medalist(s)	1st place, gold medalist(s)				
2015	Länderkampf Kunstturnen		1st place, gold medalist(s)			1st place, gold medalist(s)	2nd place, silver medalist(s)
2015	World Championships		24				
2016	Baku World Challenge Cup				3rd place, bronze medalist(s)	1st place, gold medalist(s)	1st place, gold medalist(s)
2016	City of Jesolo Trophy	2nd place, silver medalist(s)	4			5	4
2016	Olympic Test Event	1st place, gold medalist(s)	2nd place, silver medalist(s)			2nd place, silver medalist(s)	1st place, gold medalist(s)
2016	Anadia World Challenge Cup					1st place, gold medalist(s)	1st place, gold medalist(s)
2016	Olympic Games	8	WD			5	
2017	City of Jesolo Trophy	2nd place, silver medalist(s)	5			2nd place, silver medalist(s)	1st place, gold medalist(s)
2017	Koper World Challenge Cup				3rd place, bronze medalist(s)		
2017	Osijek World Challenge Cup				5	3rd place, bronze medalist(s)	2nd place, silver medalist(s)
2018	City of Jesolo Trophy	2nd place, silver medalist(s)	8				2nd place, silver medalist(s)
2018	South American Games	1st place, gold medalist(s)	2nd place, silver medalist(s)		1st place, gold medalist(s)	1st place, gold medalist(s)	
2018	Brazilian National Championships		4			2nd place, silver medalist(s)	1st place, gold medalist(s)
2018	Brazilian Event Championships					1st place, gold medalist(s)	2nd place, silver medalist(s)
2018	Pan American Championships	2nd place, silver medalist(s)	3rd place, bronze medalist(s)			2nd place, silver medalist(s)	2nd place, silver medalist(s)
2018	World Championships	7	8				5
2018	Arthur Gander Memorial		2nd place, silver medalist(s)				
2018	Swiss Cup	6					
2018	Cottbus World Cup					2nd place, silver medalist(s)	1st place, gold medalist(s)
2019	EnBW DTB-Pokal Team Cup	1st place, gold medalist(s)	4				
2019	Brazilian Championships		2nd place, silver medalist(s)		2nd place, silver medalist(s)	1st place, gold medalist(s)	
2019	Pan American Games	3rd place, bronze medalist(s)	3rd place, bronze medalist(s)			5	3rd place, bronze medalist(s)
2019	World Championships		7			6	4
2021	Doha World Cup					6	
2021	Olympic Games					7	
2022	Brazil Trophy					1st place, gold medalist(s)	
2022	Pan American Championships	1st place, gold medalist(s)	1st place, gold medalist(s)		7	1st place, gold medalist(s)	2nd place, silver medalist(s)
2022	Brazilian Championships	1st place, gold medalist(s)	2nd place, silver medalist(s)		3rd place, bronze medalist(s)	3rd place, bronze medalist(s)	1st place, gold medalist(s)
2022	Paris World Challenge Cup						5
2022	World Championships	4	WD				WD
2023	Brazil Trophy				WD		
2023	Brazilian Championships	1st place, gold medalist(s)			12	2nd place, silver medalist(s)	
2023	Paris World Challenge Cup				6	3rd place, bronze medalist(s)	4
2023	World Championships	2nd place, silver medalist(s)	15				3rd place, bronze medalist(s)
2023	Pan American Games	2nd place, silver medalist(s)	2nd place, silver medalist(s)		3rd place, bronze medalist(s)	2nd place, silver medalist(s)	2nd place, silver medalist(s)
2024	Antalya World Challenge Cup					2nd place, silver medalist(s)	
2024	City of Jesolo Trophy	2nd place, silver medalist(s)	4		4	1st place, gold medalist(s)	1st place, gold medalist(s)
2024	Brazil Trophy					4	
2024	Olympic Games	3rd place, bronze medalist(s)	9				
2025	Brazilian Championships	1st place, gold medalist(s)				1st place, gold medalist(s)	
2025	Szombathely World Challenge Cup					1st place, gold medalist(s)	
2025	World Championships					4	
2026	Brazil Trophy					1st place, gold medalist(s)	
2026	Brazilian Championships	1st place, gold medalist(s)	1st place, gold medalist(s)		2nd place, silver medalist(s)	1st place, gold medalist(s)	1st place, gold medalist(s)
2026	Szombathely World Challenge Cup				1st place, gold medalist(s)	1st place, gold medalist(s)	2nd place, silver medalist(s)
2026	World Championships	5	12			3rd place, bronze medalist(s)	

Awards
Preceded by Inaugural	Brazilian Athlete of the Year (Fan's Choice); 2014	Succeeded by Thiago Pereira
Preceded by Hugo Calderano	Brazilian Athlete of the Year (Fan's Choice); 2023	Succeeded by Caio Bonfim
