= Rana Nakano =

Japanese trampoline gymnast

- Born: 10 September 1997 (age 29) Ishikawa, Fukushima
- Height: 157 cm (5 ft 2 in)

Gymnastics career
- Discipline: Trampoline gymnastics
- Country represented: Japan; (2014-)
- Club: Seiryo Club
- Head coach: Norifumi Yamamoto
Medal record
Women's trampoline gymnastics
Representing Japan
Summer Youth Olympics
Silver medal – second place	2014 Nanjing	Individual
Pacific Rim Championships
Gold medal – first place	2018 Medellin	Individual
Gold medal – first place	2018 Medellin	Synchro
Gold medal – first place	2018 Medellin	Team

Rana Nakano (中野 蘭菜, Nakano Rana; born 10 September 1997) is a Japanese former trampoline gymnast who competed at the 2016 Summer Olympics. She won the individual silver medal at the 2014 Summer Youth Olympics and won three gold medals at the 2018 Pacific Rim Championships.

== Gymnastics career ==
Nakano began the sport at age four in Kanazawa, Japan. Her mother sent her to a trampolining class in order to overcome her shy personality. At the 2011 World Age Group Competition, she won the individual silver medal in the 13–14 age group, behind France's Léa Labrousse.

Nakano won the individual bronze medal at the 2014 Junior Asian Championships and qualified for the 2014 Summer Youth Olympics. There, she qualified for the individual final in seventh place and went on to win the silver medal, behind China's Zhu Xueying. She then competed at the 2014 World Championships and finished 13th in the individual qualifications. She placed 10th in the semifinals and did not advance to the final.

At the 2015 World Championships, Nakano finished 22nd in the individual qualifications and then placed 14th in the semi-finals. She competed with Hikaru Mori in the synchro event at the 2016 Brescia World Cup, and they won the silver medal. She represented Japan at the 2016 Summer Olympics and placd 13th in the individual qualifications. At the 2018 Pacific Rim Championships, she won the individual gold medal by one-tenth of a point ahead of teammate Reina Satake. Nakano and Satake won a gold medal together in the synchro event, and Japan won the team event.
