= Saki Tanaka =

Japanese shogi player (born 1994)

- Native name: 田中沙紀
- Born: November 18, 1994 (age 30)
- Hometown: Kanazawa, Ishikawa Prefecture, Japan

Career
- Achieved professional status: September 1, 2021 (aged 26)
- Badge Number: LPSA W-22
- Rank: Women's 1-kyū
- Teacher: Yaichio Ōno (7-dan)

Websites
- LPSA profile page

Saki Tanaka (田中 沙紀, Tanaka Saki; born November 11, 1994) is a Japanese women's professional shogi player ranked 1-kyū. She is a member of the Ladies Professional Shogi-players' Association of Japan.

== Women's shogi professional ==
=== Promotion history ===
Tanaka's promotion history is as follows.

- 3-kyū: June 2018
- 2-kyū: September 1, 2021
- 1-kyū: July 11, 2022

Note: All ranks are women's professional ranks.
