= Karen Villanueva =

Mexican rhythmic gymnast

- Full name: Karen Villanueva Vázquez
- Born: November 10, 1998 (age 27) Tampico, Tamaulipas, Mexico

Gymnastics career
- Country represented: Mexico
Medal record
Pan American Championships
Silver medal – second place	2021 Rio de Janeiro	Group All-around
Silver medal – second place	2023 Guadalajara	Group All-around
Pan American Games
Gold medal – first place	2019 Lima	Group all-around
Gold medal – first place	2019 Lima	5 balls
Silver medal – second place	2019 Lima	3 hoops + 2 clubs

Karen Villanueva Vázquez (Note: In this Spanish name, the first or paternal surname is Villanueva and the second or maternal family name is Vázquez.) (born 10 November 1998) is a Mexican rhythmic gymnast.

Villanueva competed at the 2019 Pan American Games where she won gold medals in the group all-around and 5 balls events and a silver medal in the 3 hoops + 2 clubs event.

Villanuevas was born in Tampico, Tamaulipas, Mexico.
