= Mildred Maldonado =

Mexican rhythmic gymnast

- Full name: Mildred Maldonado Ramírez
- Born: August 24, 2001 (age 25) Tamaulipas, Mexico

Gymnastics career
- Country represented: Mexico
Medal record
Pan American Games
Gold medal – first place	2019 Lima	Group all-around
Gold medal – first place	2019 Lima	5 balls
Silver medal – second place	2019 Lima	3 hoops + 2 clubs

Mildred Maldonado Ramírez (Note: In this Spanish name, the first or paternal surname is Maldonado and the second or maternal family name is Ramírez.) (born 24 August 2001) is a Mexican rhythmic gymnast.

Maldonado competed at the 2019 Pan American Games where she won gold medals in the group all-around and 5 balls events and a silver medal in the 3 hoops + 2 clubs event.
