= 2023 Pan American Gymnastics Championships =

2023 Pan American Gymnastics Championships refers to a number of competitions in different gymnastics disciplines comprising nations located in North America, Central America and the Caribbean, and South America.

== Competitions ==
- 2023 Pan American Artistic Gymnastics Championships
- 2023 Pan American Rhythmic Gymnastics Championships
- 2023 Pan American Trampoline and Tumbling Championships
