= Natalie Garcia (gymnast) =

Canadian rhythmic gymnast

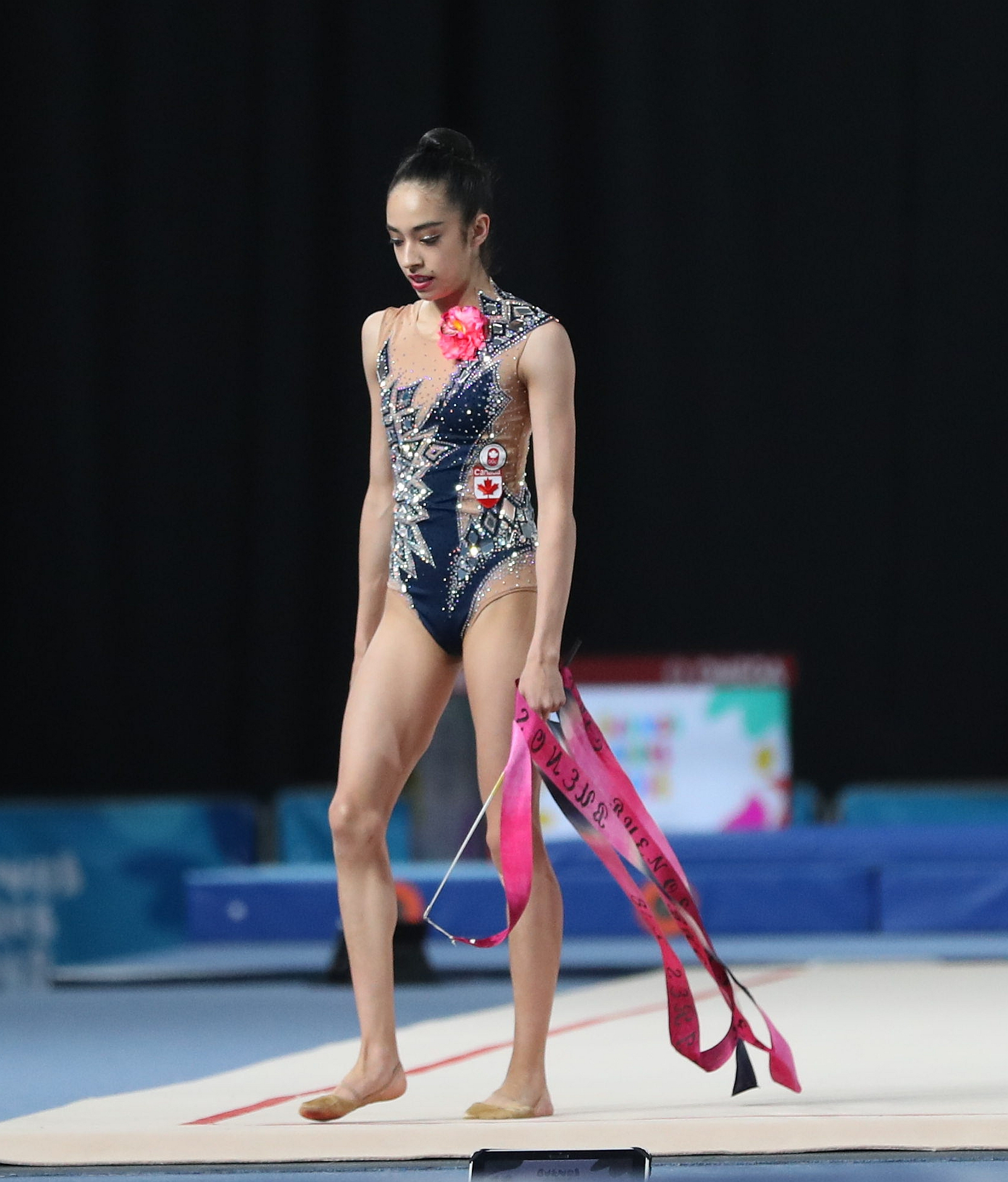
- Garcia at 2018 Summer Youth Olympics

Personal information
- Born: March 21, 2003 (age 23) Toronto, Ontario, Canada
- Height: 165 cm (5 ft 5 in)

Gymnastics career
- Country represented: Canada
Medal record
Pan American Games
Silver medal – second place	2019 Lima	Clubs
Pacific Rim Championships
Silver medal – second place	2016 Everett	Team
Silver medal – second place	2016 Everett	Junior ribbon
Silver medal – second place	2018 Medellín	Team
Silver medal – second place	2018 Medellín	Junior clubs
Bronze medal – third place	2018 Medellín	Junior hoop
Bronze medal – third place	2018 Medellín	Junior ball

Natalie Garcia (born March 21, 2003) is a Canadian retired individual rhythmic gymnast. She won the silver medal in the clubs final at the 2019 Pan American Games, and she also competed at the 2018 Summer Youth Olympics.

== Career ==
Garcia began gymnastics recreationally at age 7. Her coaches noted that she had natural talent and encouraged her to train for competitive gymnastics.

In 2014, Garcia won second place at the novice national championships, in addition to gold and two silver the event finals. The next year, she improved upon this result by becoming the novice national champion and winning three golds and a bronze in the event finals.

At the Pacific Rim Gymnastics Championships in April 2016, she won silver medals in the team and junior ribbon events, and she placed 4th in the all-around. In July, she won silver at the junior national championships. The next year, she was third at the junior national championships.

In 2018, she again competed at the Pacific Rim Championships, where she won another silver medal in the team event. In the all-around, she placed 5th, and she went on to win silver with clubs and bronze with hoop and ball. At the Junior Pan American Gymnastics Championships in May, she won another silver team medal with her teammates. Individually, she won silver in the all-around, and in the apparatus finals, she was 1st with clubs, 2nd with ball, 3rd with hoop, and 4th with ribbon.

Garcia won the junior national champion title. She was subsequently selected for the 2018 Summer Youth Olympics, where she finished 21st.

At the 2019 Canadian Championships, competing as a senior, she won silver in the all-around. Speaking about her transition to senior competition, she said, "My routines got a lot harder. We added a lot more difficulty. I also needed to be more precise and really work on my mental training. I've gotten better at that. I've been more confident in myself."

Competing at the 2019 Pan American Games, Garcia finished 10th in the all-around but won a silver medal in the clubs final. At her first World Championships, she placed 62nd in the all-around, with her best result being 45th with ribbon.

The World Championships were her last major international competition. Her last domestic competition was the 2020 Elite Canada, where she placed second in the all-around. She announced her retirement in September 2021, saying, "It was a very difficult decision to make but I am ready to move on from my gymnastics career."
