= Adriana Hernández =

Mexican rhythmic gymnast

- Born: January 16, 2003 (age 23) Tamaulipas, Mexico

Gymnastics career
- Country represented: Mexico
Medal record
Pan American Games
Gold medal – first place	2019 Lima	Group all-around
Gold medal – first place	2019 Lima	5 balls
Silver medal – second place	2019 Lima	3 hoops + 2 clubs

Adriana Hernández (born 16 January 2003) is a Mexican rhythmic gymnast.

Hernández competed at the 2019 Pan American Games where she won gold medals in the group all-around and 5 balls events and a silver medal in the 3 hoops + 2 clubs event.
