= Nicole Sladkov =

American rhythmic gymnast

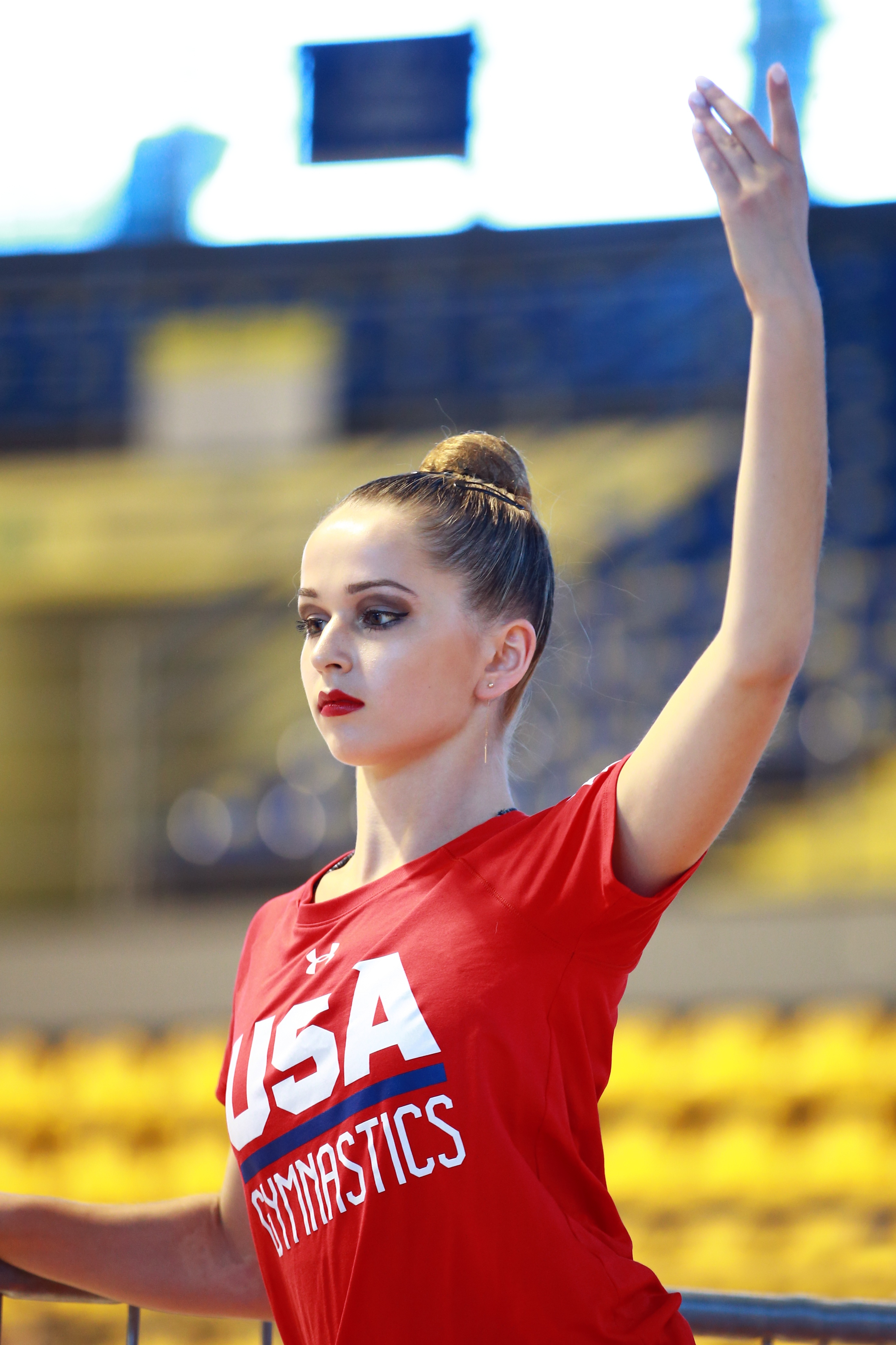
- Sladkov in June 2017

Personal information
- Born: November 2, 1999 (age 27) Lake Forest, Illinois
- Height: 5 ft 6 in (168 cm)

Gymnastics career
- Discipline: Rhythmic gymnastics
- Country represented: United States; (2012–2021)
- Club: North Shore Rhythmic Gymnastics Center
- Retired: August 25, 2021
Medal record
Rhythmic gymnastics
Representing United States
Pan American Games
Silver medal – second place	2019 Lima	Group all-around
Silver medal – second place	2019 Lima	5 balls
Pan American Championships
Gold medal – first place	2017 Daytona Beach	5 hoops
Silver medal – second place	2017 Daytona Beach	Group all-around
Silver medal – second place	2017 Daytona Beach	3 balls + 2 ropes
Silver medal – second place	2018 Lima	Group all-around
Silver medal – second place	2018 Lima	3 balls + 2 ropes

Nicole Sladkov (born November 2, 1999) is an American group rhythmic gymnast who represented the United States at the 2020 Summer Olympics.

== Career ==
Sladkov began rhythmic gymnastics because her mother is a coach. She competed as a junior at the 2014 Pacific Rim Championships and won a silver medal in the group all-around and in 5 clubs and a bronze medal in 5 hoops.

Sladkov competed with the senior U.S. group at the 2017 World Championships and finished twelfth in the group all-around. At the 2017 Pan American Championships in Daytona Beach, Florida, she won the gold medal in the 5 hoops and silver medals in the group all-around and 3 balls + 2 ropes, both behind Brazil.

Sladkov competed at the 2018 World Championships in Sofia where the American group finished fourteenth in the all-around. Then at the 2018 Pan American Championships in Lima, she won the silver medal in both the group all-around and the 3 balls + 2 ropes event final, both behind Mexico.

Sladkov competed at the 2019 Pan American Games in Lima and won the silver medal in the group all-around and in the 5 balls event final, both times finishing behind Mexico. Then at the 2019 World Championships in Baku, the American group finished tenth in the group all-around.

Sladkov was selected to represent the United States at the 2020 Summer Olympics alongside Isabelle Connor, Camilla Feeley, Lili Mizuno, and Elizaveta Pletneva. They finished eleventh in the qualification round for the group all-around.
