= Isabelle Connor =

American rhythmic gymnast

- Nickname: Izzy
- Born: July 22, 2000 (age 26)
- Height: 5 ft 7 in (170 cm)

Gymnastics career
- Discipline: Rhythmic gymnastics
- Country represented: (2018 - present)
- Club: North Shore Rhythmic Gymnastics Center
Medal record
Rhythmic gymnastics
Representing United States
Pan American Games
| Silver medal – second place | 2019 Lima | Group all-around |
| Silver medal – second place | 2019 Lima | 5 balls |
| Bronze medal – third place | 2023 Santiago | Group all-Around |
| Bronze medal – third place | 2023 Santiago | 5 Hoops |
| Bronze medal – third place | 2023 Santiago | 3 ribbons + 2 balls |
Pan American Championships
| Silver medal – second place | 2018 Lima | Group all-around |
| Silver medal – second place | 2018 Lima | 3 balls + 2 ropes |
| Bronze medal – third place | 2021 Rio de Janeiro | Group All-around |
| Bronze medal – third place | 2021 Rio de Janeiro | 5 balls |
| Bronze medal – third place | 2021 Rio de Janeiro | 3 hoops + 4 clubs |
| Bronze medal – third place | 2023 Guadalajara | Group All-around |

Isabelle Connor (born July 22, 2000) is an American group rhythmic gymnast who represented the United States at the 2020 Summer Olympics. She was the first student at the University of California, Santa Cruz to compete at the Olympics.

== Personal life ==
Connor was born on July 22, 2000, and her hometown is Manhattan Beach, California. She began artistic gymnastics when she was two years old, and she switched to rhythmic gymnastics when she was ten at the suggestion of her coaches. In 2017, she moved to Chicago to train with the U.S. national rhythmic gymnastics group. She was a student at Mira Costa High School, but she finished her senior year in homeschool after moving. She was a student at the University of California, Santa Cruz studying astronomy and astrophysics. She speaks both English and Russian.

== Career ==
Connor began her career as an individual rhythmic gymnast, but she switched to group rhythmic gymnastics and joined the U.S. National Team in 2018. She competed at the 2018 World Championships in Sofia where the American group finished fourteenth in the all-around. At the 2018 Pan American Championships, Connor and the U.S. team won the silver medal in both the group all-around and the 3 balls + 2 ropes event final.

Connor competed at the 2019 Pan American Games in Lima and helped the American team win the silver medal in the group all-around and in the 5 balls event final. Then at the 2019 World Championships in Baku, the American group finished tenth.

At the 2021 Pan American Championships in Rio de Janeiro, Connor and the American group won the bronze medals in the all-around, and in both the 5 balls and the 3 hoops + 4 clubs event finals. The United States qualified for the 2020 Olympic Games after Japan's host spot was reallocated because of their 2019 World Championship top-ten finish. Connor was selected to represent the United States at the 2020 Summer Olympics alongside Camilla Feeley, Lili Mizuno, Nicole Sladkov, and Elizaveta Pletneva. She was the first UC Santa Cruz student to compete at the Olympic Games. They finished eleventh in the qualification round for the group all-around.
