= Camilla Feeley =

American rhythmic gymnast

- Nickname: Cama
- Born: November 14, 1999 (age 27) Maryland, United States

Gymnastics career
- Discipline: Rhythmic gymnastics
- Country represented: United States
- Club: North Shore Rhythmic Gymnastics Center
Medal record
Rhythmic gymnastics
Representing United States
Pan American Games
Gold medal – first place	2019 Lima	Clubs
Silver medal – second place	2019 Lima	All-around
Bronze medal – third place	2019 Lima	Ball
Bronze medal – third place	2019 Lima	Hoop
Pacific Rim Championships
Gold medal – first place	2016 Everett	Team
Gold medal – first place	2016 Everett	Ribbon
Gold medal – first place	2018 Medellín	Team
Gold medal – first place	2018 Medellín	All-around
Gold medal – first place	2018 Medellín	Ribbon
Gold medal – first place	2018 Medellín	Hoop
Gold medal – first place	2018 Medellín	Ball
Gold medal – first place	2018 Medellín	Clubs
Silver medal – second place	2016 Everett	All-around
Silver medal – second place	2016 Everett	Hoop
Silver medal – second place	2016 Everett	Ball
Pan American Championships
Bronze medal – third place	2021 Rio de Janeiro	Group All-around
Bronze medal – third place	2021 Rio de Janeiro	5 Balls
Bronze medal – third place	2021 Rio de Janeiro	3 Hoops + 4 Clubs

Camilla Feeley (born November 14, 1999) is an American individual and Olympic group rhythmic gymnast. She won a total of four medals at the 2019 Pan American Games. She competed at the 2020 Summer Olympics in the group all-around. She swept the gold medals at the 2018 Pacific Rim Championships and won two gold medals at the 2016 Pacific Rim Championships.

== Gymnastics career ==
Feeley began rhythmic gymnastics when she was five years old.

At the 2014 Junior Pan American Championships, Feeley won a team gold medal and individual silver medals with the clubs and ribbon. She competed at her first World Championships in 2015 and finished ninth with the American team.

Feeley won a gold medal with the American team at the 2016 Pacific Rim Championships. Individually, she won a gold medal in the ribbon final, and she won silver medals in the all-around, hoop, and ball finals, all behind teammate Aliya Protto. She was an alternate for the 2016 Summer Olympics. At the 2018 Pacific Rim Championships, Feeley swept the individual gold medals and also won gold in the team event. At the 2018 World Championships, Feeley helped the United States finished seventh in the team event.

Feeley represented the United States at the 2019 Pan American Games and won the silver medal in the all-around behind teammate Evita Griskenas. She won bronze medals in both the hoop and ball finals. Then the next day, she won a gold medal in the clubs final. She then won a bronze medal in the ribbon final at the Portimao World Challenge Cup, becoming the first American rhythmic gymnast to win a World Challenge Cup medal. At the 2019 World Championships in Baku, Azerbaijan, the American team of Feeley, Griskenas, and Laura Zeng placed seventh.

Feeley began competing with the American national group in 2021. At the 2021 Pan American Championships in Rio de Janeiro, Feeley and the American group won the bronze medals in the all-around, and in both the 5 balls and the 3 hoops + 4 clubs event finals. She was selected to represent the United States at the 2020 Summer Olympics alongside Isabelle Connor, Lili Mizuno, Nicole Sladkov, and Elizaveta Pletneva. They finished 11th in the qualification round for the group all-around. After the Olympic Games, she competed at the 2021 World Championships where the American group finished tenth in the all-around.
