= Gymnastics at the 2023 Pan American Games – Women's rhythmic individual all-around =

Women's rhythmic individual all-around at the 2023 Pan American Games
- Venue: Training Center for Collective Sport
- Dates: November 2
- Competitors: 18 from 11 nations
- Winning score: 129.550

Medalists
Gold medal	Barbara Domingos	Brazil
Silver medal	Evita Griskenas	United States
Bronze medal	Maria Eduarda; Alexandre	Brazil

The women's rhythmic individual all-around competition of the rhythmic gymnastics events at the 2023 Pan American Games was held on November 2 at the Training Center for Collective Sport in the National Stadium cluster in Santiago, Chile.

== Schedule ==
Date	Time	Round
November 2, 2023	16:00	Final

== Results ==
The results were as follows:

Rank	Gymnast	Hoop (rhythmic gymnastics)	Ball (rhythmic gymnastics)	Clubs (rhythmic gymnastics)	Ribbon (rhythmic gymnastics)	Total
1st place, gold medalist(s)	Barbara Domingos (BRA)	32.000	33.200	32.200	32.150	129.550
2nd place, silver medalist(s)	Evita Griskenas (USA)	32.800	31.950	31.400	31.250	127.400
3rd place, bronze medalist(s)	Maria Eduarda Alexandre (BRA)	33.550	30.750	32.350	30.600	127.250
4	Marina Malpica (MEX)	32.650	31.850	31.500	30.300	126.300
5	Lili Mizuno (USA)	30.750	30.800	31.050	29.250	121.850
6	Geovanna Santos (BRA)	28.650	30.850	29.900	29.550	118.950
7	Celeste D'Arcángelo (ARG)	30.900	29.450	28.000	28.450	116.800
8	Carmel Kallemaa (CAN)	27.700	27.950	27.700	25.400	108.750
9	Tatiana Cocsanova (CAN)	26.650	28.850	27.000	24.250	106.750
10	Ledia Juárez (MEX)	28.150	26.050	26.750	25.300	106.250
11	Lina Dussan (COL)	27.550	28.150	27.050	22.500	105.250
12	Oriana Viñas (COL)	27.350	27.200	24.450	24.800	103.800
13	Javiera Rubilar (CHI)	25.500	26.700	25.250	25.900	103.350
14	Martina Gil (ARG)	25.600	24.950	23.000	23.650	97.200
15	Sophía Fernández (VEN)	25.500	25.150	23.400	22.800	96.850
16	Gretel Mendoza (CUB)	25.150	24.350	22.800	24.350	96.650
17	Sofía Lay (PER)	23.700	24.550	23.150	20.050	91.450
18	Gloriana Sánchez (CRC)	21.900	21.800	24.050	21.750	89.500
