= Gymnastics at the 2023 Pan American Games – Women's rhythmic individual ball =

Women's rhythmic individual ball at the 2023 Pan American Games
- Venue: Training Center for Collective Sport
- Dates: November 1, November 3
- Competitors: 18 from 10 nations
- Winning score: 33.000

Medalists
Gold medal	Barbara Domingos	Brazil
Silver medal	Geovanna Santos	Brazil
Bronze medal	Evita Griskenas	United States

The women's rhythmic individual ball competition of the rhythmic gymnastics events at the 2023 Pan American Games was held on November 1 and 3, at the Training Center for Collective Sport in the National Stadium cluster in Santiago, Chile.

== Schedule ==
Date	Time	Round
November 1, 2023	16:00	Qualification
November 3, 2023	11:50	Final

== Results ==
=== Qualification round ===
The highest eight scores advance to the final. Only 2 gymnasts per NOC could advance.

Rank	Gymnast	Ball (rhythmic gymnastics)	Notes
1	Barbara Domingos (BRA)	33.200	Q
2	Evita Griskenas (USA)	31.950	Q
3	Marina Malpica (MEX)	31.850	Q
4	Geovanna Santos (BRA)	30.850	Q
5	Lili Mizuno (USA)	30.800	Q
6	Maria Eduarda Alexandre (BRA)	30.750	
7	Celeste D'Arcángelo (ARG)	29.450	Q
8	Tatiana Cocsanova (CAN)	28.850	Q
9	Lina Dussan (COL)	28.150	Q
10	Carmel Kallemaa (CAN)	27.950	R1
11	Oriana Viñas (COL)	27.200	R2
12	Javiera Rubilar (CHI)	26.700	R3
13	Ledia Juárez (MEX)	26.050	
14	Sophia Fernández (VEN)	25.150	
15	Martina Gil (ARG)	24.950	
16	Sofía Lay (PER)	24.550	
17	Gretel Mendoza (CUB)	24.350	
18	Gloriana Sánchez (CRC)	21.800	

=== Final ===
The results were as follows:

Rank	Gymnast	Ball (rhythmic gymnastics)	Notes
1st place, gold medalist(s)	Barbara Domingos (BRA)	33.000	
2nd place, silver medalist(s)	Geovanna Santos (BRA)	31.650	
3rd place, bronze medalist(s)	Evita Griskenas (USA)	31.500	
4	Marina Malpica (MEX)	31.250	
5	Lili Mizuno (USA)	30.000	
6	Celeste D'Arcángelo (ARG)	29.150	
7	Tatiana Cocsanova (CAN)	28.100	
8	Lina Dussan (COL)	27.500	
