= Gymnastics at the 2023 Pan American Games – Women's rhythmic individual club =

Women's rhythmic individual club at the 2023 Pan American Games
- Venue: Training Center for Collective Sport
- Dates: November 2 and November 4
- Competitors: 18 from 10 nations
- Winning score: 33.000

Medalists
Gold medal	Maria Eduarda; Alexandre	Brazil
Silver medal	Barbara Domingos	Brazil
Bronze medal	Evita Griskenas	United States

The women's rhythmic individual club competition of the rhythmic gymnastics events at the 2023 Pan American Games was held on November 2 and 4, at the Training Center for Collective Sport in the National Stadium cluster in Santiago, Chile.

== Schedule ==
Date	Time	Round
November 2, 2023	16:00	Qualification
November 4, 2023	11:30	Final

== Results ==
=== Qualification round ===
The highest eight scores advance to the final. Only 2 gymnasts per NOC could advance.

Rank	Gymnast	Clubs (rhythmic gymnastics)	Notes
1	Maria Eduarda Alexandre (BRA)	32.350	Q
2	Barbara Domingos (BRA)	32.200	Q
3	Marina Malpica (MEX)	31.500	Q
4	Evita Griskenas (USA)	31.400	Q
5	Lili Mizuno (USA)	31.050	Q
6	Geovanna Santos (BRA)	29.900	
7	Celeste D'Arcangelo (ARG)	28.000	Q
8	Carmel Kallemaa (CAN)	27.700	Q
9	Lina Dussan (COL)	27.050	Q
10	Tatiana Cocsanova (CAN)	27.000	R1
11	Ledia Juárez (MEX)	26.750	R2
12	Javiera Rubilar (CHI)	25.250	R3
13	Oriana Viñas (COL)	24.450	
14	Gloriana Sánchez (CRC)	24.050	
15	Sophia Fernández (VEN)	23.400	
16	Sofía Lay (PER)	23.150	
17	Martina Gil (ARG)	23.000	
18	Gretel Mendoza (CUB)	22.800	

=== Final ===
The results were as follows:

Rank	Gymnast	Clubs (rhythmic gymnastics)	Notes
1st place, gold medalist(s)	Maria Eduarda Alexandre (BRA)	33.000	
2nd place, silver medalist(s)	Barbara Domingos (BRA)	31.000	
3rd place, bronze medalist(s)	Evita Griskenas (USA)	30.500	
4	Celeste D'Arcangelo (ARG)	29.150	
5	Marina Malpica (MEX)	28.750	
6	Carmel Kallemaa (CAN)	28.700	
7	Lina Dussan (COL)	27.350	
8	Lili Mizuno (USA)	27.350	
