= Gymnastics at the 2023 Pan American Games – Women's rhythmic individual ribbon =

Women's rhythmic individual ribbon at the 2023 Pan American Games
- Venue: Training Center for Collective Sport
- Dates: November 2 and November 4
- Competitors: 18 from 10 nations
- Winning score: 31.750

Medalists
Gold medal	Barbara Domingos	Brazil
Silver medal	Maria Eduarda; Alexandre	Brazil
Bronze medal	Evita Griskenas	United States

The women's rhythmic individual ribbon competition of the rhythmic gymnastics events at the 2023 Pan American Games was held on November 2 and 4, at the Training Center for Collective Sport in the National Stadium cluster in Santiago, Chile.

== Schedule ==
Date	Time	Round
November 2, 2023	16:00	Qualification
November 4, 2023	12:20	Final

== Results ==
=== Qualification round ===
The highest eight scores advance to the final. Only 2 gymnasts per NOC could advance.

Rank	Gymnast	Ribbon (rhythmic gymnastics)	Notes
1	Barbara Domingos (BRA)	32.150	Q
2	Evita Griskenas (USA)	31.250	Q
3	Maria Eduarda Alexandre (BRA)	30.600	Q
4	Marina Malpica (MEX)	30.300	Q
5	Geovanna Santos (BRA)	29.550	
6	Lili Mizuno (USA)	29.250	Q
7	Celeste D'Arcangelo (ARG)	28.450	Q
8	Javiera Rubilar (CHI)	25.900	Q
9	Carmel Kallemaa (CAN)	25.400	Q
10	Ledia Juárez (MEX)	25.300	R1
11	Oriana Viñas (COL)	24.800	R2
12	Gretel Mendoza (CUB)	24.350	R3
13	Tatiana Cocsanova (CAN)	24.520	
14	Martina Gil (ARG)	23.650	
15	Sophia Fernández (VEN)	22.800	
16	Lina Dussan (COL)	22.500	
17	Gloriana Sánchez (CRC)	21.750	
18	Sofía Lay (PER)	20.050	

=== Final ===
The results were as follows:

Rank	Gymnast	Ribbon (rhythmic gymnastics)	Notes
1st place, gold medalist(s)	Barbara Domingos (BRA)	31.750	
2nd place, silver medalist(s)	Maria Eduarda Alexandre (BRA)	31.600	
3rd place, bronze medalist(s)	Evita Griskenas (USA)	31.000	
4	Lili Mizuno (USA)	30.700	
5	Celeste D'Arcangelo (ARG)	29.600	
6	Marina Malpica (MEX)	29.600	
7	Carmel Kallemaa (CAN)	29.300	
8	Javiera Rubilar (CHI)	25.050	
