= Gymnastics at the 2023 Pan American Games – Women's rhythmic individual hoop =

Women's rhythmic individual hoop at the 2023 Pan American Games
- Venue: Training Center for Collective Sport
- Dates: November 1 and November 3
- Competitors: 18 from 10 nations
- Winning score: 32.700

Medalists
Gold medal	Maria Eduarda; Alexandre	Brazil
Silver medal	Barbara Domingos	Brazil
Bronze medal	Evita Griskenas	United States

The women's rhythmic individual hoop competition of the rhythmic gymnastics events at the 2023 Pan American Games was held on November 1 and 3, at the Training Center for Collective Sport in the National Stadium cluster in Santiago, Chile.

== Schedule ==
Date	Time	Round
November 1, 2023	16:00	Qualification
November 3, 2023	11:10	Final

== Results ==
=== Qualification round ===
The highest eight scores advance to the final. Only 2 gymnasts per NOC could advance.

Rank	Gymnast	Hoop (rhythmic gymnastics)	Notes
1	Maria Eduarda Alexandre (BRA)	33.550	Q
2	Evita Griskenas (USA)	32.800	Q
3	Marina Malpica (MEX)	32.650	Q
4	Barbara Domingos (BRA)	32.000	Q
5	Celeste D'Arcangelo (ARG)	30.900	Q
6	Lili Mizuno (USA)	30.750	Q
7	Geovanna Santos (BRA)	28.650	
8	Ledia Juárez (MEX)	28.150	Q
9	Carmel Kallemaa (CAN)	27.700	Q
10	Lina Dussan (COL)	27.550	R1
11	Oriana Viñas (COL)	27.350	R2
12	Tatiana Cocsanova (CAN)	26.650	R3
13	Martina Gil (ARG)	25.600	
14	Javiera Rubilar (CHI)	25.500	
15	Sophia Fernández (VEN)	25.500	
16	Gretel Mendoza (CUB)	25.150	
17	Sofía Lay (PER)	23.700	
18	Gloriana Sánchez (CRC)	21.900	

=== Final ===
The results were as follows:

Rank	Gymnast	Hoop (rhythmic gymnastics)	Notes
1st place, gold medalist(s)	Maria Eduarda Alexandre (BRA)	32.700	
2nd place, silver medalist(s)	Barbara Domingos (BRA)	32.550	
3rd place, bronze medalist(s)	Evita Griskenas (USA)	31.950	
4	Lili Mizuno (USA)	30.650	
5	Marina Malpica (MEX)	29.500	
6	Celeste D'Arcangelo (ARG)	29.200	
7	Ledia Juárez (MEX)	28.100	
8	Carmel Kallemaa (CAN)	26.700	
