= 2014 Pacific Rim Gymnastics Championships – Rhythmic Gymnastics =

The Rhythmic Gymnastics competition for the 2014 Pacific Rim Gymnastics Championships was held on 10 April to 12 April 2014 at the Richmond Olympic Oval. The juniors and seniors competed together in the team final and individual all-around, but competed separately during the apparatus finals. Only the juniors will compete in the group competition. The junior group competition as well as the ball and hoop portion of the team and all-around competition were held on 10 April. The ribbons and club portion of the team and all-around competition were held on 11 April, The apparatus finals were held on 12 April.

== Team ==
Results

Rank	Team	Hoop (rhythmic gymnastics)	Ball (rhythmic gymnastics)	Clubs (rhythmic gymnastics)	Ribbon (rhythmic gymnastics)	Total
1st place, gold medalist(s)	United States	56.800	56.450	57.300	55.150	225.700
1st place, gold medalist(s)	Nastasya Generalova	~~12.950~~	13.200	14.150	13.550	225.700
1st place, gold medalist(s)	Ekatherina Kapitonova	13.400	~~12.850~~	~~12.300~~	13.350	225.700
1st place, gold medalist(s)	Brigita Budginas					225.700
1st place, gold medalist(s)	Aliya Protto	14.850	15.100	14.250	14.550	225.700
1st place, gold medalist(s)	Cindy Lu	13.950	15.000	14.850	13.700	225.700
1st place, gold medalist(s)	Valeriya Sharipova	14.600	13.150	14.050	~~13.200~~	225.700
2nd place, silver medalist(s)	Canada	53.950	53.750	55.650	50.250	213.600
2nd place, silver medalist(s)	Katherine Uchida	12.450	~~10.900~~	12.900	~~10.750~~	213.600
2nd place, silver medalist(s)	Cindy Huh	~~11.250~~	11.600	~~12.200~~	10.950	213.600
2nd place, silver medalist(s)	Dana Tors					213.600
2nd place, silver medalist(s)	Annabelle Kovacs	13.100	12.350	13.550	12.800	213.600
2nd place, silver medalist(s)	Maria Kitkarska	13.550	13.600	13.800	11.550	213.600
2nd place, silver medalist(s)	Patricia Bezzoubenko	14.850	16.200	15.400	14.950	213.600
3rd place, bronze medalist(s)	China	51.150	48.650	52.850	50.450	203.100
3rd place, bronze medalist(s)	Wang Ruoqi	~~11.800~~	11.400	~~12.400~~	~~10.950~~	203.100
3rd place, bronze medalist(s)	Wang Yujia	12.400	~~9.800~~			203.100
3rd place, bronze medalist(s)	Zhao Yating	14.050	13.250	13.650	13.450	203.100
3rd place, bronze medalist(s)	Ma Qianhui			12.600	12.300	203.100
3rd place, bronze medalist(s)	Xu Xioalan	12.300	12.350	13.000	13.050	203.100
3rd place, bronze medalist(s)	Wang Yili	12.400	11.650	13.600	11.650	203.100
4	Australia	50.750	46.200	47.900	47.700	192.550
4	Maya Bennett	~~10.850~~	10.950	10.550	10.150	192.550
4	Ying Cui Chan	11.100	~~8.800~~	~~9.700~~	~~7.350~~	192.550
4	Choe Rhiannon					192.550
4	Danielle Prince	13.300	10.400	13.550	12.900	192.550
4	Jaelle Cohen	13.100	13.000	12.350	12.950	192.550
4	Taylor Tirahardjo	13.250	11.850	11.450	11.700	192.550
5	Chinese Taipei	46.350	47.150	45.950	44.450	183.900
5	Tzu-Wen Li	11.600	10.800	10.900	8.700	183.900
5	Ni-Chen Ku	12.600	12.300	11.900	12.550	183.900
5	Yun Kung	10.800	11.800	11.750	12.000	183.900
5	Chia-Hui Sung	11.350	12.250	11.400	11.200	183.900
6	Mexico	48.850	45.400	43.750	44.000	182.000
6	Edna Garcia	12.000	12.450	11.450	12.000	182.000
6	Marina Malpica	12.650	11.450	11.500	11.300	182.000
6	Ledia Juárez	~~10.550~~	10.300	9.650		182.000
6	Andrea Garza				~~9.450~~	182.000
6	Karen Villanueva	12.200	~~9.050~~	11.150	10.700	182.000
6	Alejandra Vazquez	12.000	11.200	~~8.600~~	10.000	182.000
7	New Zealand	44.950	38.550	43.450	43.050	170.000
7	Annaliese Graham	10.550	8.650	~~8.750~~	~~9.850~~	170.000
7	Clemintine Hutchison	10.200	8.950	11.250	10.050	170.000
7	Minette Prinsloo	~~10.100~~	9.700	9.250	9.900	170.000
7	Amelia Coleman	12.300	~~8.250~~	11.350	11.750	170.000
7	Ashleigh O'Neill	11.900	11.250	11.600	11.350	170.000
8	Singapore	41.100	39.000	38.200	39.550	157.850
8	Hwai Min Palada Tang	~~8.050~~	~~8.800~~	9.150	8.050	157.850
8	Michele Petrova Lau	10.250	9.300	8.750	9.850	157.850
8	Ying Avryl Tan	9.050	9.300	9.100	~~7.950~~	157.850
8	Yi Lin Phaan					157.850
8	Kah Mun Tong	11.900	10.050	11.200	12.000	157.850
8	Yun Xi Dawne Chua	9.900	10.350	8.650	~~9.450~~	157.850
9	Hong Kong	33.450	33.250	34.000	32.700	133.400
9	Tsz Ching Yau	8.800	7.100	7.400	7.500	133.400
9	Sze Nam Yu	7.400	~~6.950~~	8.300	7.750	133.400
9	Hilda Yeung	8.500	7.700	~~6.900~~	~~7.050~~	133.400
9	Stacey Devina Chan					133.400
9	Lia Chun Cheng	~~6.750~~	9.700	9.750	9.600	133.400
9	Jun Ying Wong	8.750	8.750	8.550	7.850	133.400

== Senior ==
=== All-Around ===
Results

Rank	Gymnast	Nation	Hoop (rhythmic gymnastics)	Ball (rhythmic gymnastics)	Clubs (rhythmic gymnastics)	Ribbon (rhythmic gymnastics)	Total
1st place, gold medalist(s)	Patricia Bezzoubenko	Canada	14.850	16.200	15.400	14.950	61.400
2nd place, silver medalist(s)	Aliya Protto	United States	14.850	15.100	14.250	14.550	58.750
3rd place, bronze medalist(s)	Cindy Lu	United States	13.950	15.000	14.850	13.700	57.500
4	Valeriya Sharipova	United States	14.600	13.150	14.050	13.200	55.000
5	Maria Kitkarska	Canada	13.550	13.600	13.800	11.550	52.500
6	Annabelle Kovacs	Canada	13.100	12.350	13.550	12.800	51.800
7	Jaelle Cohen	Australia	13.100	13.000	12.350	12.950	51.400
8	Xu Xioalan	China	12.300	12.350	13.000	13.050	50.700
9	Ma Qianhui	China	13.800	11.850	12.600	12.300	50.550
10	Danielle Prince	Australia	13.300	10.400	13.550	12.900	50.150
11	Ni-Chen Ku	Chinese Taipei	12.600	12.300	11.900	12.550	49.350
12	Wang Yili	China	12.400	11.650	13.600	11.650	49.300
13	Taylor Tirahardjo	Australia	13.250	11.850	11.450	11.700	48.250
14	Yun Kung	Chinese Taipei	10.800	11.800	11.750	12.000	46.350
15	Chia-Hui Sung	Chinese Taipei	11.350	12.250	11.400	11.200	46.200
16	Ashleigh O'Neill	New Zealand	11.900	11.250	11.600	11.350	46.100
17	Kah Mun Tong	Singapore	11.900	10.050	11.200	12.000	45.350
18	Amelia Coleman	New Zealand	12.300	8.250	11.350	11.750	43.650
19	Karen Villanueva	Mexico	12.200	9.050	11.150	10.700	43.100
20	Alejandra Vazquez	Mexico	12.000	11.200	8.600	10.000	41.800
21	Yun Xi Dawne Chua	Singapore	9.900	10.350	8.650	9.450	38.350
22	Stacey Devina Chan	Hong Kong	11.150	8.300	9.050	9.500	38.000
23	Yi Lin Phaan	Singapore	10.450	8.300	9.000	9.850	37.600
24	Lia Chun Cheng	Hong Kong	6.750	9.700	9.750	9.600	35.800
25	Jun Ying Wong	Hong Kong	8.750	8.750	8.550	7.850	33.900

=== Hoop ===
Results

Rank	Gymnast	Nation	D Score	E Score	Pen.	Total
1st place, gold medalist(s)	Aliya Protto	United States	7.550	7.650	0.000	15.200
1st place, gold medalist(s)	Patricia Bezzoubenko	Canada	7.700	7.500	0.000	15.200
3rd place, bronze medalist(s)	Valeriya Sharipova	United States	6.550	7.250	0.000	13.800
4	Ma Qianhui	China	5.650	7.550	0.000	13.200
5	Maria Kitkarska	Canada	6.100	6.900	0.000	13.000
6	Taylor Tirahardjo	Australia	5.250	7.000	0.000	12.250
7	Danielle Prince	Australia	5.050	6.700	0.000	11.750
8	Ni-Chen Ku	Chinese Taipei	5.250	6.250	0.000	11.500

=== Ball ===
Results

Rank	Gymnast	Nation	D Score	E Score	Pen.	Total
1st place, gold medalist(s)	Cindy Lu	United States	7.900	7.850	0.000	15.750
2nd place, silver medalist(s)	Aliya Protto	United States	7.800	7.850	0.000	15.650
3rd place, bronze medalist(s)	Patricia Bezzoubenko	Canada	7.950	7.600	0.000	15.550
4	Maria Kitkarska	Canada	6.350	7.650	0.000	14.000
5	Jaelle Cohen	Australia	5.350	7.200	0.000	12.550
6	Xu Xioalan	China	5.650	6.800	0.000	12.450
7	Chia-Hui Sung	Chinese Taipei	5.350	6.900	0.000	12.250
8	Ni-Chen Ku	Chinese Taipei	5.350	6.200	0.000	11.550

=== Clubs ===
Results

Rank	Gymnast	Nation	D Score	E Score	Pen.	Total
1st place, gold medalist(s)	Patricia Bezzoubenko	Canada	8.200	8.250	0.000	16.450
2nd place, silver medalist(s)	Cindy Lu	United States	7.850	7.750	0.150	15.450
3rd place, bronze medalist(s)	Aliya Protto	United States	7.650	7.500	0.000	15.150
4	Danielle Prince	Australia	5.900	6.900	0.000	12.800
5	Maria Kitkarska	Canada	5.600	7.150	0.000	12.750
6	Wang Yili	China	6.250	6.450	0.000	12.700
7	Jaelle Cohen	Australia	5.600	6.900	0.000	12.500
8	Xu Xioalan	China	5.350	6.350	0.000	11.700

=== Ribbon ===
Results

Rank	Gymnast	Nation	D Score	E Score	Pen.	Total
1st place, gold medalist(s)	Patricia Bezzoubenko	Canada	8.050	8.200	0.000	16.250
2nd place, silver medalist(s)	Cindy Lu	United States	7.950	7.650	0.000	15.600
3rd place, bronze medalist(s)	Aliya Protto	United States	7.650	7.450	0.000	15.100
4	Danielle Prince	Australia	6.500	7.350	0.000	13.850
5	Ni-Chen Ku	Chinese Taipei	6.300	7.200	0.000	13.500
6	Annabelle Kovacs	Canada	5.650	7.250	0.000	12.900
7	Jaelle Cohen	Australia	5.550	7.100	0.000	12.650
8	Xu Xioalan	China	5.100	6.100	0.000	11.200

== Junior ==
=== All-Around ===
Results

Rank	Gymnast	Nation	Hoop (rhythmic gymnastics)	Ball (rhythmic gymnastics)	Clubs (rhythmic gymnastics)	Ribbon (rhythmic gymnastics)	Total
1st place, gold medalist(s)	Zhao Yating	China	14.050	13.250	13.650	13.450	54.400
2nd place, silver medalist(s)	Nastasya Generalova	United States	12.950	13.200	14.150	13.550	53.850
3rd place, bronze medalist(s)	Ekatherina Kapitonova	United States	13.400	12.850	12.300	13.350	51.900
4	Brigita Budginas	United States	14.000	11.450	13.750	12.550	51.750
5	Edna Garcia	Mexico	12.000	12.450	11.450	12.000	47.900
6	Katherine Uchida	Canada	12.450	10.900	12.900	10.750	47.000
7	Marina Malpica	Mexico	12.650	11.450	11.500	11.300	46.900
8	Wang Ruoqi	China	11.800	11.400	12.400	10.950	46.550
9	Cindy Huh	Canada	11.250	11.600	12.200	10.950	46.000
10	Wang Yujia	China	12.400	9.800	11.750	11.500	45.450
11	Dana Tors	Canada	12.000	11.050	10.600	10.650	44.300
12	Maya Bennett	Australia	10.850	10.950	10.550	10.150	42.500
13	Tzu-Wen Li	Chinese Taipei	11.600	10.800	10.900	8.700	42.000
14	Choe Rhiannon	Australia	10.950	9.850	10.250	9.700	40.750
15	Ledia Juárez	Mexico	10.550	10.300	9.650	10.200	40.700
16	Clemintine Hutchison	New Zealand	10.200	8.950	11.250	10.050	40.450
17	Andrea Garza	Mexico	11.000	10.250	9.500	9.450	40.200
18	Minette Prinsloo	New Zealand	10.100	9.700	9.250	9.900	38.950
19	Michele Petrova Lau	Singapore	10.250	9.300	8.750	9.850	38.150
20	Annaliese Graham	New Zealand	10.550	8.650	8.750	9.850	37.800
21	Ying Cui Chan	Australia	11.100	8.800	9.700	7.350	36.950
22	Ying Avryl Tan	Singapore	9.050	9.300	9.100	7.950	35.400
23	Hwai Min Palada Tang	Singapore	8.050	8.800	9.150	8.050	34.050
24	Tsz Ching Yau	Hong Kong	8.800	7.100	7.400	7.500	30.800
25	Sze Nam Yu	Hong Kong	7.400	6.950	8.300	7.750	30.400
26	Hilda Yeung	Hong Kong	8.500	7.700	6.900	7.050	30.150

=== Hoop ===
Results

Rank	Gymnast	Nation	D Score	E Score	Pen.	Total
1st place, gold medalist(s)	Ekatherina Kapitonova	United States	6.450	7.550	0.000	
1st place, gold medalist(s)	Zhao Yating	China	6.050	7.950	0.000	
3rd place, bronze medalist(s)	Brigita Budginas	United States	6.000	7.750	0.000	
4	Edna Garcia	Mexico	5.050	7.750	0.000	
5	Wang Yujia	China	5.100	7.350	0.000	
6	Marina Malpica	Mexico	5.050	7.350	0.000	
7	Katherine Uchida	Canada	4.850	7.300	0.000	
8	Tzu-Wen Li	Chinese Taipei	4.200	6.450	0.600	

=== Ball ===
Results

Rank	Gymnast	Nation	D Score	E Score	Pen.	Total
1st place, gold medalist(s)	Ekatherina Kapitonova	United States	6.450	7.550	0.000	14.000
1st place, gold medalist(s)	Zhao Yating	China	5.950	8.050	0.000	14.000
3rd place, bronze medalist(s)	Nastasya Generalova	United States	6.000	7.650	0.000	13.650
4	Edna Garcia	Mexico	4.950	7.350	0.000	12.300
5	Marina Malpica	Mexico	4.850	7.050	0.000	11.900
6	Cindy Huh	Canada	4.450	7.250	0.000	11.700
6	Wang Ruoqi	China	4.400	7.300	0.000	11.700
8	Maya Bennett	Australia	3.750	5.900	0.000	9.650

=== Clubs ===
Results

Rank	Gymnast	Nation	D Score	E Score	Pen.	Total
1st place, gold medalist(s)	Nastasya Generalova	United States	6.950	7.900	0.000	14.850
2nd place, silver medalist(s)	Brigita Budginas	United States	6.300	7.600	0.000	13.900
3rd place, bronze medalist(s)	Zhao Yating	China	5.800	7.250	0.000	13.050
4	Edna Garcia	Mexico	5.200	7.500	0.000	12.700
5	Cindy Huh	Canada	4.700	7.600	0.000	12.300
6	Wang Ruoqi	China	5.000	7.050	0.000	12.050
7	Katherine Uchida	Canada	4.700	6.700	0.000	11.400
8	Marina Malpica	Mexico	4.200	6.300	0.000	10.500

=== Ribbon ===
Results

Rank	Gymnast	Nation	D Score	E Score	Pen.	Total
1st place, gold medalist(s)	Ekatherina Kapitonova	United States	7.200	7.400	0.000	14.600
2nd place, silver medalist(s)	Nastasya Generalova	United States	6.600	7.850	0.000	14.450
3rd place, bronze medalist(s)	Zhao Yating	China	5.400	7.900	0.000	13.300
4	Marina Malpica	Mexico	5.350	7.600	0.000	12.950
5	Edna Garcia	Mexico	5.350	7.700	0.200	12.850
6	Wang Yujia	China	5.300	7.200	0.000	12.500
7	Katherine Uchida	Canada	4.450	7.250	0.000	11.700
8	Cindy Huh	Canada	4.600	7.050	0.000	11.650

=== Group ===
Results

Rank	Gymnasts	Nation	5 Hoops	5 Clubs	Total
1st place, gold medalist(s)	Hu Yuhui; Li Ziyi; Liu Xin; Jin Kebing; Shi Jiayi; Siyuan You	China	12.900	13.800	26.700
2nd place, silver medalist(s)	Yelyzaveta Merenzon; Elina Nikerina; Sophia Popova; Emily Rakhnyansky; Nicole Sladkov; Nicky Wojtana	United States	12.000	13.100	25.100
3rd place, bronze medalist(s)	Jael Chew; Edlyn Zen Uee Ho; Noelle Goh; Alison Tan; Siew Lyn Yeo; Wan Xuan	Singapore	12.050	12.050	24.100
4	Elizabet Belittchenko; Diana Noskova; Anna-Marie Ondaatje; Dana Tors; Katherine Uchida	Canada	11.350	12.700	24.500
