= 2016 Pan American Rhythmic Gymnastics Championships =

International sports competition

The 2016 Pan American Rhythmic Gymnastics Championships were held in Merida, Yucatán, Mexico, November 4–9, 2016. The competition was organized by the Mexican Gymnastics Federation, and approved by the International Gymnastics Federation.

== Medal summary ==
=== Senior medalists ===
Event	Gold	Silver	Bronze
Team	Mexico; Karla Diaz; Cindy Gallegos; Marina Malpica	Brazil; Natália Gaudio; Barbara Domingos; Carolina Garcia	Canada; Megan Hamilton; Athena Tsaltas; Erika Bernard
Individual all-around	Natália Gaudio (BRA)	Karla Diaz (MEX)	Marina Malpica (MEX)
Hoop	Natália Gaudio (BRA)	Karla Diaz (MEX)	Barbara Domingos (BRA)
Ball	Karla Diaz (MEX)	Natália Gaudio (BRA)	Marina Malpica (MEX)
Clubs	Natália Gaudio (BRA)	Marina Malpica (MEX)	Karla Diaz (MEX)
Ribbon	Natália Gaudio (BRA)	Barbara Domingos (BRA) Karla Diaz (MEX)	—
Group all-around	Mexico; Diana Casillas; Edna Garcia; Guadalupe Resendiz; Pamela Reynolds; Karen Villanueva	Brazil; Drielly Daltoe; Carolina Garcia; Natália Gaudio; Simone Luiz; Fernanda Ribeiro; Jéssica Silveira	Chile; Catalina Araya; Catalina Zapata; Gabriela Vallejos; María Ignacia León; Maite Arce
Group 5 ribbons	Mexico; Diana Casillas; Edna Garcia; Guadalupe Resendiz; Pamela Reynolds; Karen Villanueva	Brazil; Drielly Daltoe; Carolina Garcia; Natália Gaudio; Simone Luiz; Fernanda Ribeiro; Jéssica Silveira	Chile; Catalina Araya; Catalina Zapata; Gabriela Vallejos; María Ignacia León; Maite Arce
Group 6 clubs + 2 hoops	Mexico; Diana Casillas; Edna Garcia; Guadalupe Resendiz; Pamela Reynolds; Karen Villanueva	Brazil; Drielly Daltoe; Carolina Garcia; Natália Gaudio; Simone Luiz; Fernanda Ribeiro; Jéssica Silveira	Chile; Catalina Araya; Catalina Zapata; Gabriela Vallejos; María Ignacia León; Maite Arce

=== Junior medalists ===
Event	Gold	Silver	Bronze
Team	Brazil; Heloisa Bornal; Mariany Miyamoto; Vitoria Guerra	Mexico; Ledia Juárez; Andrea Garza; Ana Patricia de Luna	Canada; Alexandra Chtrevenskii; Natalie Garcia; Sophie Crane
Individual all-around	Heloisa Bornal (BRA)	Mariany Miyamoto (BRA)	Ledia Juárez (MEX)
Rope	Heloisa Bornal (BRA)	Ledia Juárez (MEX)	Andrea Garza (MEX)
Hoop	Vitoria Guerra (BRA)	Alexandra Chtrevenskii (CAN)	Ana Aponte (PUR)
Ball	Heloisa Bornal (BRA)	Ledia Juárez (MEX)	Natalie Garcia (CAN)
Clubs	Ledia Juárez (MEX)	Heloisa Bornal (BRA)	Mariany Miyamoto (BRA) Ana Aponte (PUR)
Group all-around	Mexico	Canada	Chile
5 balls	Mexico	Canada	Chile
5 ribbons	Mexico	Canada	Chile

== Medal table ==
Senior
Rank	Nation	Gold	Silver	Bronze	Total
1	Mexico (MEX)	5	4	3	12
2	Brazil (BRA)	4	6	1	11
3	Chile (CHI)	0	0	3	3
4	Canada (CAN)	0	0	1	1
Totals (4 entries)		9	10	8	27

Junior
Rank	Nation	Gold	Silver	Bronze	Total
1	Brazil (BRA)	5	2	1	8
2	Mexico (MEX)	4	3	2	9
3	Canada (CAN)	0	4	2	6
4	Chile (CHI)	0	0	3	3
5	Puerto Rico (PUR)	0	0	2	2
Totals (5 entries)		9	9	10	28

Total
Rank	Nation	Gold	Silver	Bronze	Total
1	Brazil (BRA)	9	8	2	19
2	Mexico (MEX)	9	7	5	21
3	Canada (CAN)	0	4	3	7
4	Chile (CHI)	0	0	6	6
5	Puerto Rico (PUR)	0	0	2	2
Totals (5 entries)		18	19	18	55
