= Yelyzaveta Merenzon =

American rhythmic gymnast

- Nickname: Liza
- Born: August 12, 1999 (age 27) Ukraine

Gymnastics career
- Discipline: Rhythmic gymnastics
- Country represented: United States; (2014–present)
- Club: North Shore Rhythmic Gymnastics Center
Medal record
Rhythmic gymnastics
Representing United States
Pan American Games
Silver medal – second place	2019 Lima	Group all-around
Silver medal – second place	2019 Lima	5 balls
Pan American Championships
Gold medal – first place	2017 Daytona Beach	5 hoops
Silver medal – second place	2017 Daytona Beach	Group all-around
Silver medal – second place	2017 Daytona Beach	3 balls + 2 ropes
Bronze medal – third place	2021 Rio de Janeiro	Group All-around
Bronze medal – third place	2021 Rio de Janeiro	5 balls
Bronze medal – third place	2021 Rio de Janeiro	3 hoops + 4 clubs

Yelyzaveta Merenzon (born August 12, 1999) is a Ukrainian-born American group rhythmic gymnast. She was the alternate for the 2020 United States Olympic team. She won the 5 hoops event final with the American group at the 2017 Pan American Championships and won two silver medals at the 2019 Pan American Games.

== Early life and education ==
Merenzon attended Buffalo Grove High School in Buffalo Grove, Illinois. After graduating high school, she retired from the sport to focus on her education. She enrolled at the University of Chicago and majored in economics. After eight months, she decided come out of retirement and took a leave of absence from college to focus on training for the 2020 Summer Olympics. In 2024, she enrolled at the Medical College of Wisconsin.

== Career ==
Merenzon competed as a junior at the 2014 Pacific Rim Championships and won a silver medal in the group all-around. She also competed at the 2014 Junior Pan American Championships and won gold in the five hoops and 10 clubs, and bronze in the group all-around.

Merenzon competed with the senior U.S. team at the 2017 World Championships in Pesaro and finished twelfth in the group all-around. She then competed at the 2017 Pan American Championships in Daytona Beach, Florida, and won the gold medal in the 5 hoops and silver medals in the group all-around and 3 balls + 2 ropes.

Merenzon competed at the 2019 Pan American Games and won the silver medal in the group all-around and in the 5 balls. Then at the 2019 World Championships in Baku, the American team finished tenth in the group all-around.

At the 2021 Pan American Championships in Rio de Janeiro, Merenzon and the U.S. team won the bronze medals in the all-around, and in both the 5 balls and the 3 hoops + 4 clubs. The United States qualified for the 2020 Olympic Games after Japan's host spot was reallocated. Merenzon was selected to represent the United States at the 2020 Summer Olympics as a reserve.
