= 2014 Junior Pan American Rhythmic Gymnastics Championships =

International sports competition

The 2014 Junior Pan American Rhythmic Gymnastics Championships was held in Daytona Beach, United States, May 9–11, 2014.

== Medal summary ==
Event	Gold	Silver	Bronze
Team	United States; Laura Zeng; Nicole Kaloyanov; Camilla Feeley	Mexico; Edna Garcia; Marina Malpica; Ledia Juárez; Andrea Garza	Canada; Katherine Uchida; Cindy Huh; Athena Tsaltas
Individual all-around	Laura Zeng (USA)	Nicole Kaloyanov (USA)	Edna Garcia (MEX)
Hoop	Laura Zeng (USA)	Nicole Kaloyanov (USA)	Mayra Siñeriz (BRA)
Ball	Laura Zeng (USA)	Nicole Kaloyanov (USA)	Edna Garcia (MEX)
Clubs	Laura Zeng (USA)	Camilla Feeley (USA)	Edna Garcia (MEX)
Ribbon	Laura Zeng (USA)	Camilla Feeley (USA)	Edna Garcia (MEX)
Group all-around	Canada	Brazil	United States
5 hoops	United States	Canada	Brazil
10 clubs	United States	Canada	Brazil

== Medal table ==
Rank	Nation	Gold	Silver	Bronze	Total
1	United States	8	5	1	14
2	Canada	1	2	1	4
3	Mexico	0	1	4	5
4	Brazil	0	1	3	4
Totals (4 entries)		9	9	9	27
