= 2017 Pan American Rhythmic Gymnastics Championships =

International sports competition

The 2017 Pan American Rhythmic Gymnastics Championships were held in Daytona Beach, United States, October 13–15, 2017. The competition was organized by USA Gymnastics, and approved by the International Gymnastics Federation.

== Medal summary ==
=== Senior medalists ===
Event	Gold	Silver	Bronze
Team	United States; Nastasya Generalova; Evita Griskenas; Lili Mizuno	Mexico; Karla Diaz; Ledia Juárez; Marina Malpica	Brazil; Barbara Domingos; Natália Gaudio; Mariany Miyamoto; Karine Walter
Individual all-around	Evita Griskenas (USA)	Lili Mizuno (USA)	Marina Malpica (MEX)
Hoop	Evita Griskenas (USA)	Lili Mizuno (USA)	Natália Gaudio (BRA)
Ball	Evita Griskenas (USA)	Lili Mizuno (USA)	Natália Gaudio (BRA)
Clubs	Evita Griskenas (USA)	Nastasya Generalova (USA)	Karla Diaz (MEX)
Ribbon	Evita Griskenas (USA)	Lili Mizuno (USA)	Karla Diaz (MEX)
Group all-around	Brazil; Alanis Avila; Heloisa Bornal; Jéssica Maier; Gabrielle Moraes; Francielly Pereira; Marine Vieira	United States; Dasha Baltovick; Natalie Bourand; Connie Du; Yelyzaveta Merenzon; Nicole Sladkov; Kristina Soboloevskaya	Canada; Elizabet Belittchenko; Renna Cukier; Vanessa Panov; Anastasia Shanko; Alexandra Udachina
Group 5 hoops	United States; Dasha Baltovick; Natalie Bourand; Connie Du; Yelyzaveta Merenzon; Nicole Sladkov; Kristina Soboloevskaya	Brazil; Alanis Avila; Heloisa Bornal; Jéssica Maier; Gabrielle Moraes; Francielly Pereira; Marine Vieira	Mexico; Diana Casillas; Valeria Leon; Mildred Maldonado; Mariana Pacheco; Marcela Quijano; Karen Villanueva
Group 3 balls + 2 ropes	Brazil; Alanis Avila; Heloisa Bornal; Jéssica Maier; Gabrielle Moraes; Francielly Pereira; Marine Vieira	United States; Dasha Baltovick; Natalie Bourand; Connie Du; Yelyzaveta Merenzon; Nicole Sladkov; Kristina Soboloevskaya	Mexico; Diana Casillas; Valeria Leon; Mildred Maldonado; Mariana Pacheco; Marcela Quijano; Karen Villanueva

=== Junior medalists ===
Event	Gold	Silver	Bronze
Team	United States; Elizabeth Kapitonova; Shannon Xiao; Lennox Hopkins; Matylda Marszalek	Canada; Michel Vivier; Sophie Crane; Natalie Garcia	Mexico; Kimberly Salazar; Xitlaly Santana; Elianne Martinez
Individual all-around	Elizabeth Kapitonova (USA)	Michel Vivier (CAN)	Natalie Garcia (CAN)
Hoop	Michel Vivier (CAN)	Elizabeth Kapitonova (USA)	Shannon Xiao (USA)
Ball	Elizabeth Kapitonova (USA)	Shannon Xiao (USA)	Michel Vivier (CAN)
Clubs	Elizabeth Kapitonova (USA)	Lennox Hopkins (USA)	Michel Vivier (CAN)
Ribbon	Elizabeth Kapitonova (USA)	Michel Vivier (CAN)	Xitlaly Santana (MEX)
Group all-around	United States	Mexico	Chile
5 ropes	United States	Mexico	Chile
10 clubs	United States	Mexico	Canada

== Medal table ==
Senior
Rank	Nation	Gold	Silver	Bronze	Total
1	United States (USA)	7	7	0	14
2	Brazil (BRA)	2	1	3	6
3	Mexico (MEX)	0	1	5	6
4	Canada (CAN)	0	0	1	1
Totals (4 entries)		9	9	9	27

Junior
Rank	Nation	Gold	Silver	Bronze	Total
1	United States (USA)	8	3	1	12
2	Canada (CAN)	1	3	4	8
3	Mexico (MEX)	0	3	2	5
4	Chile (CHI)	0	0	2	2
Totals (4 entries)		9	9	9	27
