= Taylor Tirahardjo =

Australian rhythmic gymnast

- Born: 2 May 1995 (age 31) Victoria, Australia

Gymnastics career
- Discipline: Rhythmic gymnastics
- Country represented: Australia; (2008-2014 (?))

Taylor Tirahardjo (born 2 May 1995) is an Australian individual rhythmic gymnast. She has represented Australia at international competitions.

She has competed at world championships, including at the 2011 World Rhythmic Gymnastics Championships.
