= Nastasya Generalova =

American rhythmic gymnast (born 2000)

- Nickname: Stasya
- Born: January 19, 2000 (age 26) Beverly Hills, California, United States

Gymnastics career
- Discipline: Rhythmic gymnastics
- Country represented: United States; (2013–present)
- Head coach: Tatyana Itkina
- Assistant coach: Iryna Zhurenko
- World ranking: 26 WC 22 WCC (2017 Season)
Medal record
Rhythmic gymnastics
Representing United States
Grand Prix Final
Silver medal – second place	2018 Marbella	Clubs
Pacific Rim Championships
Gold medal – first place	2014 Richmond	Team
Pan American Championships
Gold medal – first place	2017 Daytona Beach	Team
Gold medal – first place	2018 Lima	Team
Silver medal – second place	2017 Daytona Beach	Clubs
Silver medal – second place	2018 Lima	Ball
Silver medal – second place	2018 Lima	Clubs
World Challenge Cup
Bronze medal – third place	2017 Portimao	Ball

Nastasya Generalova (born January 19, 2000, in Beverly Hills, California) is an American former individual rhythmic gymnast. After finishing her gymnastics career, she became a model.

== Personal life ==
Generalova's mother, Olga Generalova, immigrated to the United States from Russia, and her father is African-American. Generalova was raised by her mother. She began training in gymnastics in 2004. Generalova attended Palisades Charter High School and graduated in 2018. She committed to Columbia University, where she earned a bachelor's and a master's degree.

She appeared in Taylor Swift's music video "Shake It Off", performing as one of the rhythmic gymnasts. As well as the fifth season of the YouTube reality series SummerBreak

== Gymnastics career ==
Junior

In 2013, Generalova competed at her first U.S. Rhythmic Championships, placing 1st in clubs, 2nd in hoop, and 5th in the all-around. In 2014, she placed 4th in ball, 6th in hoop, 7th in clubs, and 5th in the all-around at the USA Gymnastics Championships.

She began competing internationally in 2014. She was first in all-around, hoop and ball at the 2014 International Tournament of Pas de Calais. Generalova was a member of the junior team at the 2014 Pacific Rim Championships where Team USA won the gold medal, and she placed second in the all-around. She won bronze in the all-around and silver in the clubs at the 2015 Irina Deleanu Cup.

Senior

In the 2016 season, Generalova began competing as a senior. Generalova competed in her first World Cup at the 2016 Tashkent World Cup, finishing 7th in the all-around and qualifying to all four apparatus finals. At her next event, the 2016 Sofia World Cup, she finished 12th in all-around. Before the 2016 Olympics, Generalova was profiled in the Lifetime series Gold Medal Families. She finished 5th in all-around at the 2016 USA Gymnastics National Championships and was not selected for the Olympic Team.

In the 2017 season, Generalova competed at the Kiev Grand Prix, where she finished 6th in the all-around and qualified to three apparatus finals. She then finished 10th in the all-around at the Tashkent World Cup and placed 7th in clubs final. At the World Challenge Cup in the Portimao World Cup, Generalova finished 5th in the all-around and qualified to three apparatus finals. She won her first medal in a World Cup by taking bronze in the ball final. She was also 4th place in hoop and 5th in ribbon.

In the 2018 season, on March 15–18, Generalova competed at the 2018 Grand Prix Kiev, finishing 5th in the all-around. She qualified for three apparatus finals and finished 6th in hoop, ball and clubs. On March 24–25, she finished 12th in the all-around at the 2018 Thiais Grand Prix. On April 20–22, at the 2018 Tashkent World Cup, Generalova finished 15th in the all-around and did not qualify for any apparatus finals. At the 2018 Pan American Gymnastics Championships in September, she took silver in ball and clubs. In October, she won her first Grand Prix series medal at the final event in Marbella, where she won the clubs final silver medal.

In February 2019, Generalova started her season by competing at the Rhythmic Challenge in Indianapolis, finishing second with ball, third all-around and with clubs and ribbon, and fourth with hoop. In April, she competed at Thiais Grand Prix, finishing 17th in the all-around. On May 4–5, Generalova competed at the Guadalajara World Challenge Cup, finishing eleventh all-around and qualifying to the ribbon final. She placed seventh in the final. At the Rhythmic Elite Qualifier on May 19, Generalova won gold with clubs and bronze in the all-around. At the USA Gymnastics Championships in July, Generalova finished fourth in the all-around. In the finals, she won the clubs bronze and was fourth with hoop, fifth with ball, and sixth with ribbon.

Generalova finished her gymnastics career in 2019. In 2024, she was featured in a documentary, Breaking Boundaries, which covers her career from 2016 to 2019 and discusses her experience with being black in a sport with very few black athletes.

== Modeling career ==
Generalova is signed to Wilhelmina Models. She has appeared in Teen Vogue.
