= Elise Trouw =

American singer-songwriter (born 1999)

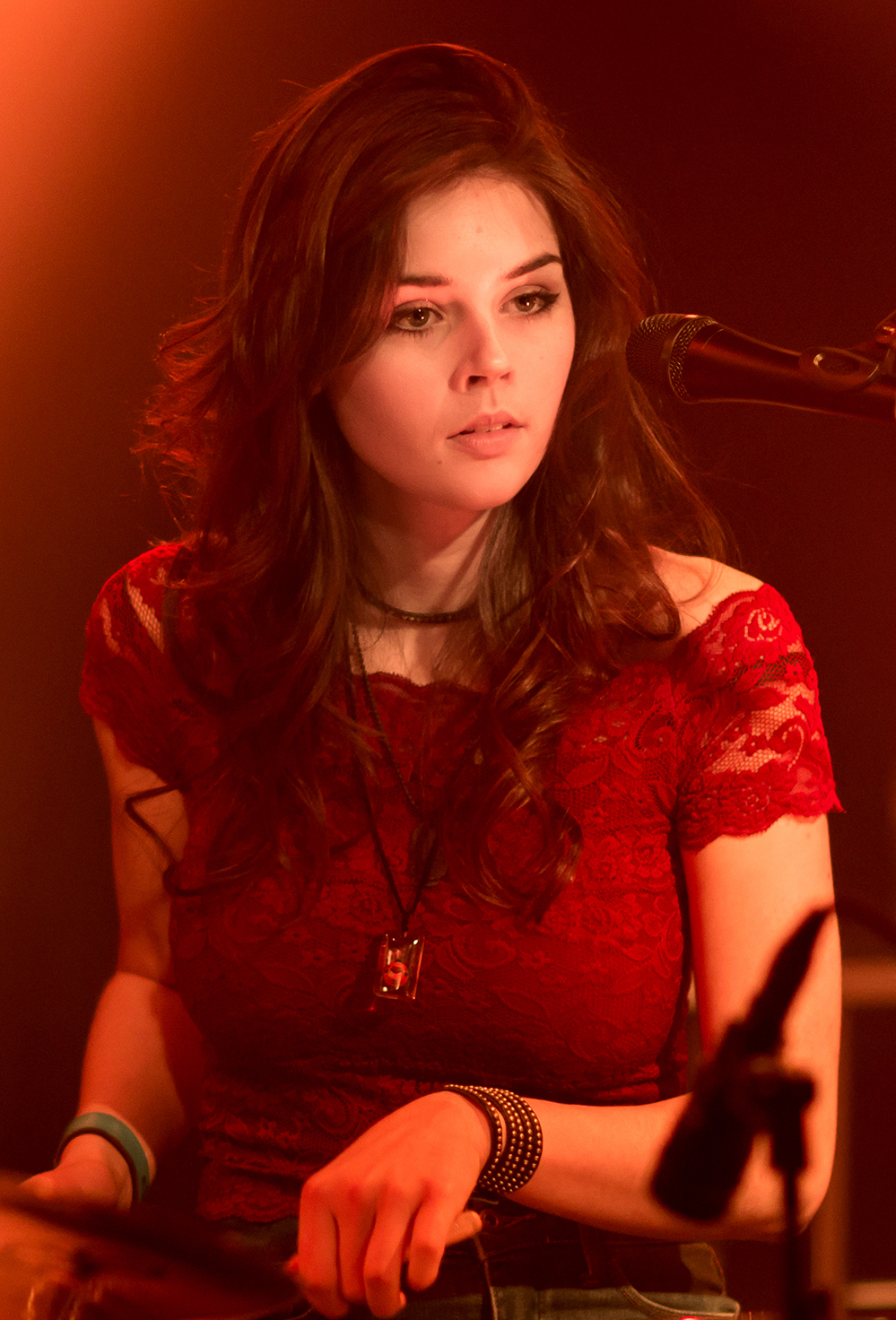
- Trouw performing at the Moroccan Lounge in downtown Los Angeles, October 2017

Background information
- Also known as: Elise
- Born: Elise Ashlyn Trouw; April 27, 1999 (age 27); Newport Beach, California, U.S.
- Origin: San Diego, California
- Genres: Alternative; pop
- Occupations: Musician, singer
- Instruments: Vocals; piano; drums; guitar; bass guitar
- Years active: 2015–present
- Label: Goober
- Website: Official website

Elise Ashlyn Trouw (born April 27, 1999) is an American singer-songwriter, multi-instrumentalist, and record producer.

== Early life and education ==
Trouw was born in Newport Beach, California to Arie and Anne Trouw. The family moved to San Diego when she was young. At six, she learned to play the piano and at age ten, she started taking drum lessons.

Trouw attended The Bishop's School in La Jolla, California from 7th to 11th grade, graduating before her senior year to pursue her music career. While in high school, she was selected to be a member of the Grammy Foundation's Grammy Camp alumni band, allowing her to perform at Club Nokia on February 11, 2016.

== Career ==
Trouw was signed in November 2015 to a one-album record deal by Pacific Records of San Diego. In September 2016, she left Pacific Records, buying out her contract and retaining the rights to her music. By October 2016, she had released four singles, "X Marks the Spot", "She Talking", "Your Way", and "Burn".

On February 24, 2017, Trouw released her ten-song debut album, Unraveling, under her own label, Goober Records based in San Diego. The album features her on drums, vocals, guitar, piano, and bass guitar; the tracks were mixed and mastered by Alan Sanderson and Christopher Hoffee. Trouw appeared as the drummer on Fox Wilde's "Soap" music video on April 4, 2017.

On May 7, 2017, Trouw celebrated the release of her debut album and her 18th birthday at The Loft at the University of California, San Diego. In late 2017 and early 2018, she released two live looping mashup videos. She is endorsed by Pearl Drums, Paiste Cymbals and Vater Percussion.

Trouw appeared on Jimmy Kimmel Live! on February 8, 2018, after being bumped from the January 30, 2018, episode. She was the first artist to be featured on the circular lobby stage at the show where she performed a Foo Fighters / Bobby Caldwell mashup, as well as the song "Awake." In 2019, she toured as the opening act with Incubus from October 16 to 27. For the Amazon Prime feature film Sound of Metal, she collaborated with Travis Barker to reimagine Metallica's Enter Sandman. In 2023, she released an EP titled “Losing Sleep” and went on tour.

== Critical reception ==
In 2016, she was listed as one of San Diego's best new bands by SoundDiego, and she was named 2017 "Breakout Artist" by NBC 7's SoundDiego. Her influences include Radiohead, The Police, Adele, John Mayer, and Tower of Power.

== Discography ==
- Unraveling (2017)
- 2017–2019 Collection (2020)
- Studio Live Session – Little Big Beat Studio (2020)
- Scary Pockets – Best Of 2020 Cover of "Dreams" by Fleetwood Mac (2021)
- Losing Sleep EP (2023)
- The Diary of Elon Lust (2026)
