= Marina Malpica =

Mexican rhythmic gymnast (born 2000)

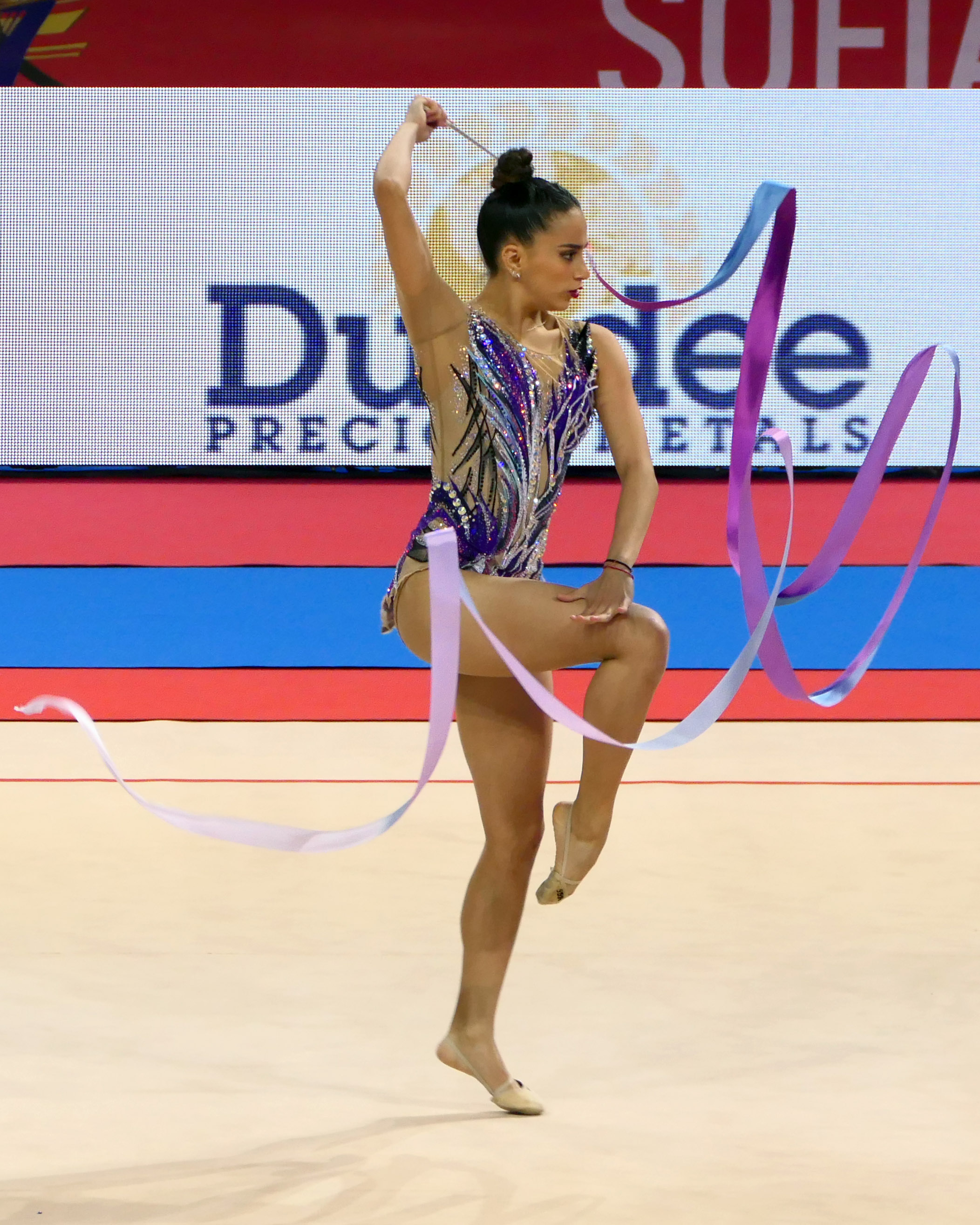
- Malpica in 2024

Personal information
- Full name: Marina Malpica Ramírez
- Born: 4 January 2000 (age 26) Quintana Roo, Mexico

Gymnastics career
- Discipline: Rhythmic gymnastics
- Country represented: Mexico; (2017-)
- Head coach: Eliza Meza
Medal record
Rhythmic Gymnastics
Representing Mexico
Pan American Championships
Gold medal – first place	2023 Guadalajara	Ball
Gold medal – first place	2022 Rio de Janeiro	Hoop
Silver medal – second place	2017 Daytona Beach	Team
Silver medal – second place	2018 Lima	Team
Silver medal – second place	2018 Lima	All-Around
Bronze medal – third place	2017 Daytona Beach	All-Around
Bronze medal – third place	2018 Lima	Hoop
Bronze medal – third place	2022 Rio de Janeiro	Ribbon
Bronze medal – third place	2024 Ciudad de Guatemala	Ribbon
Bronze medal – third place	2026 Rio de Janeiro	Team
Central American and Caribbean Games
Gold medal – first place	2018 Barranquilla	Hoop
Gold medal – first place	2018 Barranquilla	Ball
Gold medal – first place	2023 San Salvador	Team
Gold medal – first place	2023 San Salvador	All-Around
Gold medal – first place	2023 San Salvador	Hoop
Gold medal – first place	2023 San Salvador	Ball
Gold medal – first place	2023 San Salvador	Ribbon
Gold medal – first place	2026 Santo Domingo	Team
Gold medal – first place	2026 Santo Domingo	All-Around
Silver medal – second place	2018 Barranquilla	All-Around
Silver medal – second place	2018 Barranquilla	Clubs
Silver medal – second place	2023 San Salvador	Clubs

Marina Malpica Ramírez (Note: In this Spanish name, the first or paternal surname is Malpica and the second or maternal family name is Ramírez.) (born 4 January 2000) is a Mexican rhythmic gymnast. She is the first gymnast from Mexico to qualify to individual all-around final at the World Championships.

== Personal life ==
She is studying at National University of Costa Rica in Heredia, Costa Rica.

== Career ==
She took up the sport at age five in Veracruz.

=== 2014 ===
As a junior, Malpica competed at the 2014 Pacific Rim Gymnastics Championships in April. She placed 7th in the all-around and qualified to all four event finals. In May, she competed at the Junior Pan American Championships. As a member of the Mexican team, she contributed to the team silver medal, and she finished 6th in the all-around.

=== 2016 ===
Malpica debuted in senior international competition at the 2016 Pan American Championships, where she won bronze in the all-around behind Natália Gaudio and Karla Diaz. In the apparatus finals, she won silver with clubs and bronze with ball.

=== 2017 ===
Malpica again competed at the 2017 Pan American Championships, where she won silver in teams and bronze in the all-around. In the apparatus finals, she was 4th with hoop, 4th with ball, 7th with clubs and 7th with ribbon. In August, she performed at her first World Championships in Pesaro, finishing 49th in the all-around, 38th with hoop, 48th with ball, 68th with clubs and 39th with ribbon.

=== 2018 ===
In 2018 Malpica participated in the World Cup stages in Guadalajara. She took 28th place in the all-around and 25th with hoop, 35th with ball, 35th with clubs, 29th with ribbon. At the World Cup in Kazan, she placed 22nd in the all-around. She was then selected for the Central American and Caribbean Games, where she won gold with hoop and ball and silver in the all-around and with clubs.

In September, she competed at the World Championships in Sofia, where she was 18th in teams with Karla Diaz and Rut Castillo. Individually, she was 68th in the all-around, 56th with hoop, 105th with ball and 50th with clubs. Later that months, she also competed in the Pan American Championships in Lima. There she won silver in the all-around behind Laura Zeng and bronze with hoop behind Zeng and Lili Mizuno.

=== 2019 ===
Malpica competed in the World Cups in Guadalajara (29th in the all-around, 28th with hoop, 26th with ball, 31st with clubs and 29th with ribbon) and Tashkent (26th in the all-around, 27th with hoop, 24th with ball, 32nd with clubs and 25th with ribbon). At the World Championships in Baku, she only performed with ribbon. She was 58th place with the apparatus and 25th in the team competition.

=== 2021 ===
Malpica was again selected for the Mexican team that took part at the World Championships in Kitakyushu. She contributed to Mexico's team score on two apparatuses, ball and clubs, which ranked 30th and 40th respectively.

=== 2022 ===
Marina started her 2022 season at the World Cup in Portimão, where she finished 26th in the all-around, 31st with hoop, 36th with ball, 17th with clubs, and 19th with ribbon. A few days later, she was in Pesaro for another World Cup where she ranked 26th in the all-around, 27th with hoop, 29th with ball, 20th with clubs, and 32nd with ribbon.

In July, she performed at the Pan American Gymnastics Championships, where was 5th in the all-around and won gold with hoop and bronze with ribbon. In August, she competed at the last World Cup of the season in Cluj-Napoca, ending 26th in the all-around, 17th with hoop, 22nd with ball, 36th with clubs, and 15th with ribbon. She made history at the World Championships in Sofia by qualifying for the all-around final, becoming the first individual from Mexico qualify for a final at the tournament, and ending in 14th place.

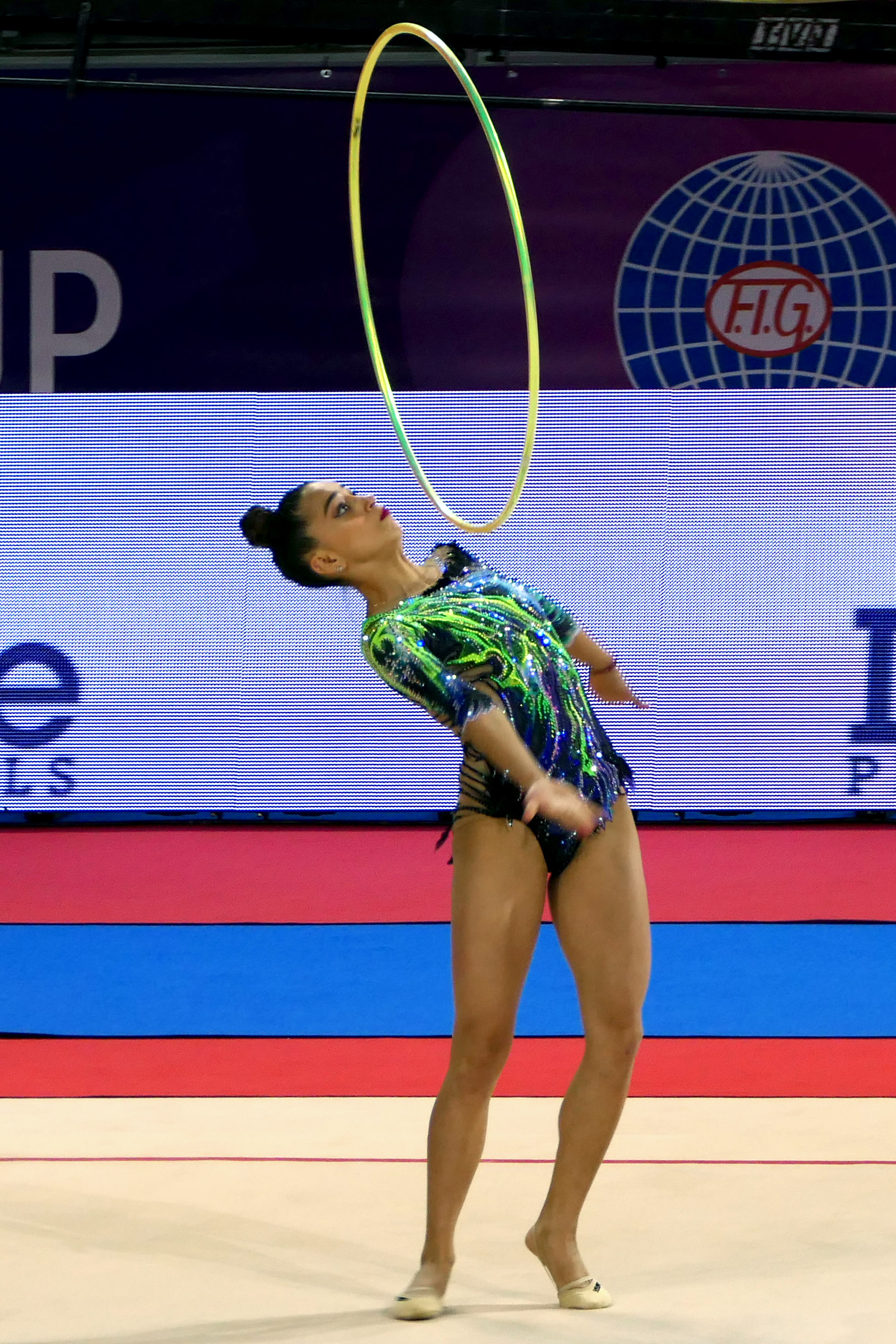
Malpica at the 2024 Sofia World Cup

=== 2023 ===
Malpica qualified to the ribbon final at Baku World Cup and finished in 8th place. In early June, she won the ball final at the Pan American Championships and finished 6th in the all-around. In late June, she competed at the Central American and Caribbean Games in San Salvador, where she won five golds and a silver - a gold in the team event with Ledia Juárez, Karla Diaz, and the senior group, and every individual final except for the clubs final, where she was silver behind Juárez.

She represented Mexico at the 2023 World Championships in Valencia, Spain; she finished in 29th place in the all-around qualifications and did not qualify to the final. Her best result was 13th place with ribbon.

In November, she competed at the 2023 Pan American Games. There was one Olympic berth available at the competition, which Malpica narrowly lost to Evita Griskenas. She ended the all-around in 4th place. Although she had qualified for all four event finals, she did not medal in any of them, which were dominated by the Brazilian gymnasts. Malpica made comments on her social media criticizing the Brazilian gymnasts and accusing the judges of bias based on nationality. She later apologized to the Brazilian gymnasts and deleted her comments, but she did not take back her comments about the judges.

=== 2024 ===
Malpica competed at the 2024 World Cup in Sofia, where she placed 30th. At the 2024 Pan American Championships in Guatemala City, she won bronze in the ribbon final behind Maria Eduarda Alexandre and Bárbara Domingos.

=== 2025 ===
On 4-6 April, she competed at the Sofia World Cup, where she took 35th place in the all-around. On April 18-20, she competed at the Baku World Cup and finished 42nd in the all-around. In June, Malpica represented Mexico at the 2025 Pan American Championships in Asunción, Paraguay. She ended on 7th place in all-around. In July, she competed at the World Challenge Cup in Cluj-Napoca and took 44th place in the all-around.

== Achievements ==
- First Mexican rhythmic gymnast to qualify for a World Championships final when she participated in the 2022 edition of the tournament in Sofia.

== Routine music information ==
Year	Apparatus	Music Title
2026	Hoop	Otto by Woodkid
2026	Ball	Keep Rising by Jessy Wilson and Angélique Kidjo
2026	Clubs	
2026	Ribbon	Honor By Duel by Brand X Music
2025	Hoop	Otto by Woodkid
2025	Ball	War, Real War (From Gladiator II) by Harry Gregson-Williams, Nelle tue mani (From Gladiator) by Andrea Bocelli
2025	Clubs	Puente Roto by Nicola Cruz
2025	Ribbon	Honor By Duel by Brand X Music
2024	Hoop	The Trail / Into the Light by Marcin Przybylowicz and District 78
2024	Ball	Gladiator Medley (Live) by Hans Zimmer
2024	Clubs	Conga (Psyk Remix) by Gloria Estefan & Miami Sound Machine
2024	Ribbon	Hypnotic by Havasi
2023	Hoop	The Trail / Into the Light by Marcin Przybylowicz and District 78
2023	Ball	Endangered Species by Dianne Reeves
2023	Clubs	Hip Hip Chin Chin by Club Des Belugas
2023	Ribbon	Hypnotic by Havasi
2022	Hoop	Qué Nivel De Mujer by Luis Miguel
2022	Ball	Endangered Species by Dianne Reeves
2022	Clubs	Hip Hip Chin Chin by Club Des Belugas
2022	Ribbon	Boom Boom by 2WEI
2021	Hoop	
2021	Ball	Crowds by Armand Amar & The City of Prague Philharmonic Orchestra
2021	Clubs	Shame On Me by Avicii
2021	Ribbon	
2019	Hoop	Akkadian Empire (Paul Dinletir Remix)
2019	Ball	Crowds by Armand Amar & The City of Prague Philharmonic Orchestra
2019	Clubs	Shame On Me by Avicii
2019	Ribbon	Total Eclipse of the Heart by Westlife
2018	Hoop	Prophecy by Full Tilt
2018	Ball	Soldier of Love by Sade
2018	Clubs	Echa Pa' Delante by Thalía
2018	Ribbon	
2017	Hoop	Prophecy by Full Tilt
2017	Ball	Io Ti Penso Amore by David Garrett feat Nicole Scherzinger
2017	Clubs	Echa Pa' Delante by Thalía
2017	Ribbon	Carmen Fantasy Violin
2016	Hoop	Prophecy by Full Tilt
2016	Ball	Merry-Go-Round (from "Howl's Moving Castle") by Joe Hisaishi
2016	Clubs	
2016	Ribbon	Buleria by David Bisbal
