= Karla Diaz (gymnast) =

Mexican rhythmic gymnast (born 1995)

Karla Díaz
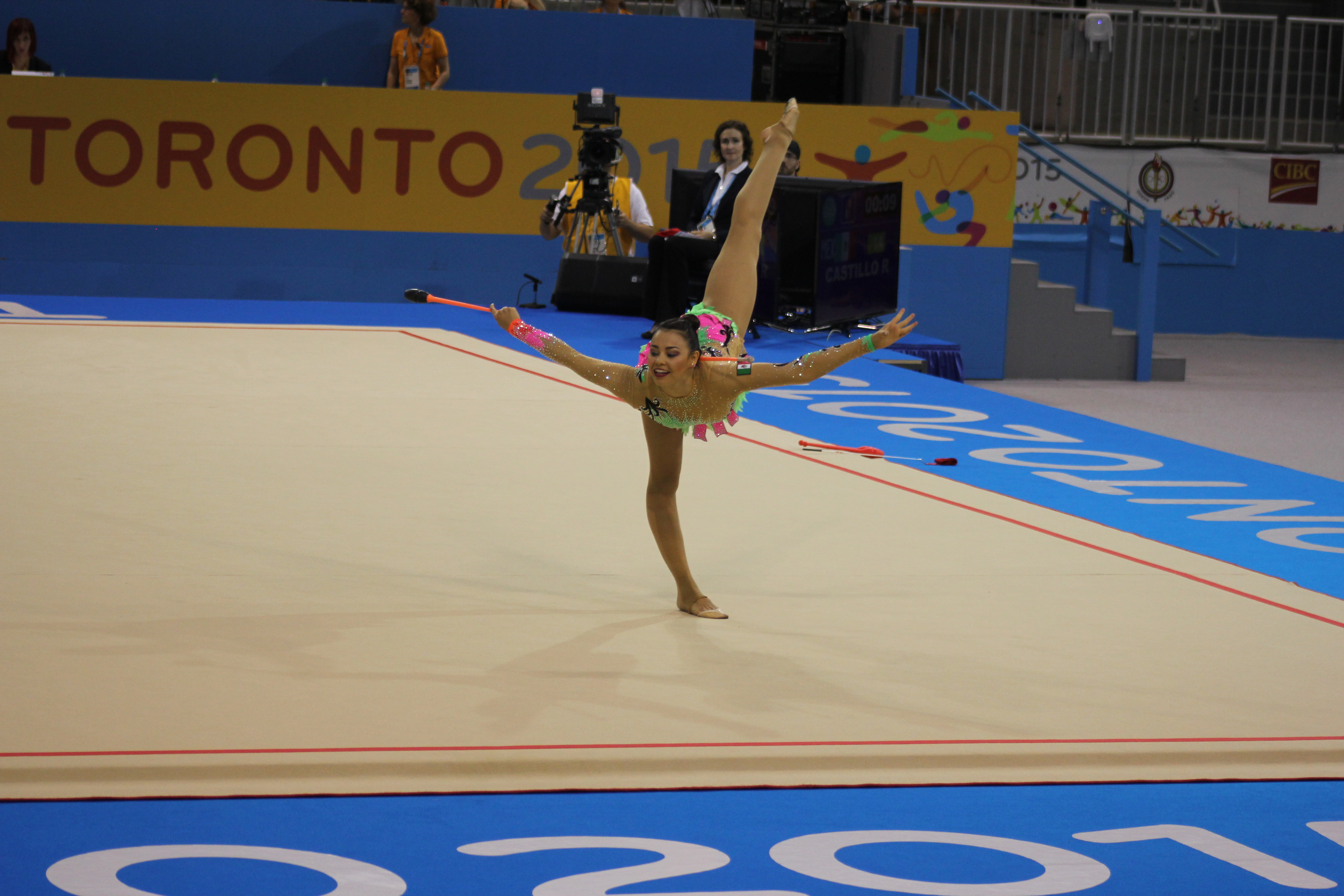
- Karla Diaz 2015 on Pan Am games

Personal information
- Full name: Karla Díaz Arnal
- Born: 5 July 1995 (age 31) Mexico City, Mexico

Gymnastics career
- Discipline: Rhythmic gymnastics
- Country represented: Mexico; (2014-)
- Head coach: Blajaith Aguilar
- Assistant coach: Efrossina Angelova
Medal record
Rhythmic Gymnastics
Representing Mexico
Pan American Games
Bronze medal – third place	2015 Toronto	Ball
Bronze medal – third place	2019 Lima	Ribbon
Pan American Championships
Gold medal – first place	2021 Rio de Janeiro	Hoop
Silver medal – second place	2017 Daytona Beach	Team
Silver medal – second place	2018 Lima	Team
Silver medal – second place	2018 Lima	Ribbon
Silver medal – second place	2021 Rio de Janeiro	Team
Bronze medal – third place	2017 Daytona Beach	Clubs
Bronze medal – third place	2017 Daytona Beach	Ribbon
Bronze medal – third place	2021 Rio de Janeiro	Clubs
Central American and Caribbean Games
Gold medal – first place	2023 San Salvador	Team
Silver medal – second place	2014 Veracruz	Clubs
Silver medal – second place	2023 San Salvador	Hoop

Karla Díaz Arnal (Note: In this Spanish name, the first or paternal surname is Díaz and the second or maternal family name is Arnal.) (born 5 July 1995) is a Mexican rhythmic gymnast. She is a multiple Pan American medalist.

== Personal life ==
She was born into a sporting family and was inspired to take up the sport at age 3 or 4, after having accompanied her sister to the hall. Her idol is Russian rhythmic gymnast Irina Tchachina. She studied communication at Anahuac University.

== Career ==
In 2014 she competed at the World Cup in Lisbon being 35th in the All-Around, 34th with hoop, 36th with ball, 35th with clubs and 32nd with ribbon. She was 40th in Corbeil-Essonnes and 36th in Minsk. At the World Championships in Izmir she ended 63rd in the All-Around, 89th with hoop, 63rd with ball, 58th with clubs and 17th in teams. In November she won silver with clubs at the Central American and Caribbean Games.

The following year she, again, debuted in Lisbon ending 38th in the All-Around, 45th with hoop, 41st with ball, 28th with clubs and 31st with ribbon. She was 31st at the World Cup in Sofia, 44th in Pesaro and 31st in Kazan. At the 2015 Pan American Games she was 5th in the All-Around, 7th with hoop, 6th with clubs, 5 with ribbon and won bronze with ball. At the World Championships she was 19th in teams, 42nd in the All-Around, 37th with hoop, 34th with ball, 41st with clubs and 77th with ribbon.

2016 saw her 34th in the World Cup in Pesaro, then she took part in the Olympics’ qualification where she took 12th place and was the first reserve for the Games.

In 2017 she started by being 23rd in the All-Around at the World Cup in Kazan. Selected for the World Championships in Pesaro she was 50th in the All-Around, 65th with hoop, 39th with ball, 67th with clubs and 21st with ribbon. At the Pan American Championships she was 5th in the All-Around, 6th with hoop, 6th with ball, won bronze with clubs and ribbon and silver in teams.

At the 2018 World Cup in Kazan she was 25th. At her fourth World Championships in Sofia she ended 50th in the All-Around, 67th with hoop, 46th with ball, 35th with clubs and 18th in teams. Then at the Pan American Championships she was 7th in the All-Around, 8th with hoop, 6th with clubs and with clubs, won silver in teams and with ribbon.

In 2019 she took 25th place in the All-Around at the World Cup in Tashkent. Later she was 43rd in Baku. Representing Mexico at the Universiade she ended in 19th place in the All-Around. She ended 38th in the World Cup in Kazan, 26th in Portimão. In July she won ribbon bronze at the Pan American Games. Diaz was again selected for the World Championships, ending 55th in the All-Around, 44th with hoop, 32nd with ball, 119th with clubs, 66th with ribbon and 25th in teams.

She was 50th in the All-Around at the World Cup in Sofia, 39th in Tashkent. At the Pan American Championships she won bronze with clubs, silver in teams and gold with hoop. Then at the World Championships she was 49th in the All-Around, 36th with hoop, 54th with ball, 50th with clubs and 53rd with ribbon.

In 2022 she only competed in the World Cup in Cluj-Napoca, finishing in 33rd place.

In 2023 she debuted at the World Cup in Athens where she was 32nd in the All-Around, in the stage in Sofia she was 31st. At the tournament in Portimão she was 10th in the All-Around, 5th with hoop and 7th with clubs. Karla won team gold and hoop silver at the Central American and Caribbean Games.
