= Edna Garcia =

American politician

Member of the Connecticut House of Representatives from the 128th district
- In office 1993–2001
- Preceded by: Joseph Grabarz
- Succeeded by: Lydia Martinez

Personal details
- Born: Humacao, Puerto Rico
- Party: Democratic
- Children: 2
- Education: Fairfield University (MEd)

Edna Iris Garcia is an American politician who served in the Connecticut House of Representatives from 1993 to 2001, representing the 128th district as a Democrat. She was born in Humacao, Puerto Rico, and she was a resident of Bridgeport, Connecticut, during her tenure. She has worked as a schoolteacher, taught English as a second language, and earned a master's degree in education from Fairfield University. Garcia is Catholic.
