= Bárbara Domingos =

Brazilian rhythmic gymnast

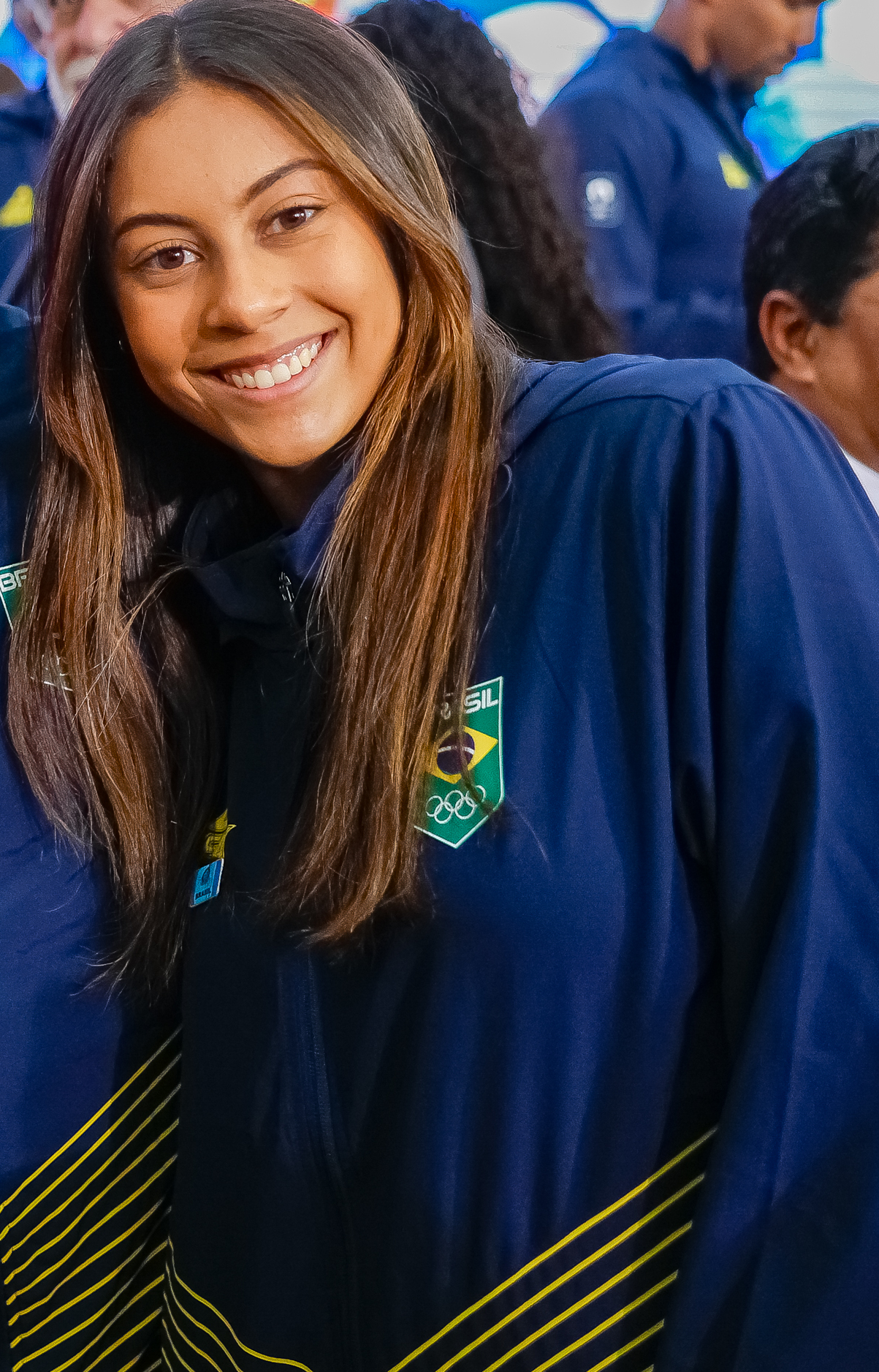
- Domingos in August 2024

Personal information
- Full name: Bárbara de Kassia Godoy Domingos
- Nickname: Babi
- Born: 2 March 2000 (age 26) Curitiba, Brazil
- Height: 1.67 m (5 ft 6 in)

Gymnastics career
- Discipline: Rhythmic gymnastics
- Country represented: Brazil
- Club: AGIR
- Head coach: Márcia Naves
Medal record
Rhythmic gymnastics
Representing Brazil
| Event | 1st | 2nd | 3rd |
|---|---|---|---|
| Pan American Games | 3 | 3 | 0 |
| Pan American Championships | 12 | 12 | 7 |
| South American Games | 6 | 5 | 0 |
| South American Championships | 17 | 4 | 3 |
| World Cup | 0 | 0 | 1 |
| World Challenge Cup | 0 | 0 | 2 |
| Grand Prix | 1 | 0 | 0 |
| Total | 39 | 24 | 13 |
Pan American Games
| Gold medal – first place | 2023 Santiago | All-Around |
| Gold medal – first place | 2023 Santiago | Ball |
| Gold medal – first place | 2023 Santiago | Ribbon |
| Silver medal – second place | 2023 Santiago | Hoop |
| Silver medal – second place | 2023 Santiago | Clubs |
| Silver medal – second place | 2019 Lima | Ribbon |
Pan American Championships
| Gold medal – first place | 2021 Rio de Janeiro | Team |
| Gold medal – first place | 2021 Rio de Janeiro | Ball |
| Gold medal – first place | 2021 Rio de Janeiro | Clubs |
| Gold medal – first place | 2023 Guadalajara | Team |
| Gold medal – first place | 2023 Guadalajara | All-Around |
| Gold medal – first place | 2023 Guadalajara | Clubs |
| Gold medal – first place | 2023 Guadalajara | Ribbon |
| Gold medal – first place | 2024 Guatemala City | Team |
| Gold medal – first place | 2024 Guatemala City | All-around |
| Gold medal – first place | 2024 Guatemala City | Hoop |
| Gold medal – first place | 2026 Rio de Janeiro | Team |
| Gold medal – first place | 2026 Rio de Janeiro | All-Around |
| Silver medal – second place | 2016 Merida | Team |
| Silver medal – second place | 2016 Merida | Ribbon |
| Silver medal – second place | 2021 Rio de Janeiro | All-around |
| Silver medal – second place | 2021 Rio de Janeiro | Hoop |
| Silver medal – second place | 2023 Guadalajara | Hoop |
| Silver medal – second place | 2024 Guatemala City | Clubs |
| Silver medal – second place | 2024 Guatemala City | Ribbon |
| Silver medal – second place | 2025 Asunción | Team |
| Silver medal – second place | 2025 Asunción | All-Around |
| Silver medal – second place | 2025 Asunción | Ball |
| Silver medal – second place | 2025 Asunción | Clubs |
| Silver medal – second place | 2026 Rio de Janeiro | Hoop |
| Bronze medal – third place | 2016 Merida | Hoop |
| Bronze medal – third place | 2017 Daytona Beach | Team |
| Bronze medal – third place | 2018 Lima | Team |
| Bronze medal – third place | 2018 Lima | Ribbon |
| Bronze medal – third place | 2025 Asunción | Hoop |
| Bronze medal – third place | 2025 Asunción | Ribbon |
| Bronze medal – third place | 2026 Rio de Janeiro | Ball |
South American Games
| Gold medal – first place | 2018 Cochabamba | Ball |
| Gold medal – first place | 2022 Asunción | All-around |
| Gold medal – first place | 2022 Asunción | Ball |
| Gold medal – first place | 2022 Asunción | Clubs |
| Gold medal – first place | 2022 Asunción | Ribbon |
| Gold medal – first place | 2026 Santa Fe | Ball |
| Silver medal – second place | 2018 Cochabamba | All-around |
| Silver medal – second place | 2018 Cochabamba | Hoop |
| Silver medal – second place | 2018 Cochabamba | Ribbon |
| Silver medal – second place | 2022 Asunción | Hoop |
| Silver medal – second place | 2026 Santa Fe | Ribbon |
South American Championships
| Gold medal – first place | 2018 Melgar | Team |
| Gold medal – first place | 2018 Melgar | All-around |
| Gold medal – first place | 2018 Melgar | Hoop |
| Gold medal – first place | 2018 Melgar | Clubs |
| Gold medal – first place | 2018 Melgar | Ribbon |
| Gold medal – first place | 2019 Bogotá | Ribbon |
| Gold medal – first place | 2021 Cali | Team |
| Gold medal – first place | 2021 Cali | All-around team |
| Gold medal – first place | 2021 Cali | All-around |
| Gold medal – first place | 2021 Cali | Hoop |
| Gold medal – first place | 2021 Cali | Ball |
| Gold medal – first place | 2021 Cali | Clubs |
| Gold medal – first place | 2021 Cali | Ribbon |
| Gold medal – first place | 2022 Paipa | Team |
| Gold medal – first place | 2022 Paipa | All-around team |
| Gold medal – first place | 2022 Paipa | All-around |
| Gold medal – first place | 2022 Paipa | Ball |
| Silver medal – second place | 2018 Melgar | Ball |
| Silver medal – second place | 2019 Bogotá | All-around |
| Silver medal – second place | 2019 Bogotá | Clubs |
| Silver medal – second place | 2022 Paipa | Clubs |
| Bronze medal – third place | 2019 Bogotá | Hoop |
| Bronze medal – third place | 2019 Bogotá | Ball |
| Bronze medal – third place | 2022 Paipa | Ribbon |

Bárbara de Kassia Godoy Domingos (born 2 March 2000) is a Brazilian individual rhythmic gymnast. She is a two-time (2023, 2024) Pan American Championships all-around champion and the first Brazilian rhythmic gymnast to qualify for the individual all-around final at the World Championships. She competed at the 2024 Paris Olympics in the rhythmic individual all-around and qualified for the final.

On the national level, she is a six-time (2017, 2019, 2021, 2022, 2025, 2026) Brazilian all-around champion.

== Career ==
Domingos took up gymnastics at age six. She began her training as an artistic gymnast, but she switched to rhythmic gymnastics upon a coach's recommendation.

=== 2016-17: First international events ===
Domingos competed at the 2016 Pan American Championships in Mérida, Mexico, winning team silver, silver in ribbon and bronze in hoop.

At the 2017 Pan American Championships in Daytona Beach, US, she won the bronze medal in the team competition with Natália Gaudio, Mariany Miyamoto and Karine Walter. On 2–4 June, she competed at the World Challenge Cup Guadalajara and took 24th place in the all-around.

=== 2018-19 ===
Domingos started the season competing at World Challenge Cup Guadalajara and took 30th place in the all-around. Next, she competed at World Challenge Cup Portimao, where she ended in 26th place in the all-around. She was most successful with ribbon (14th place). She won gold with ball and silver in the all-around and hoop and ribbon finals at the 2018 South American Games in Cochabamba.

In September, she made her World Championships debut alongside Natalia Gaudio at the 2018 World Championships. She finished 54th place in the all-around qualifications. Later in the month, she competed at the 2018 Pan American Championships in Lima, Peru, where she was 6th in the all-around and won bronze medals in team and ribbon. The next month, at the South American Championships in Melgar, she won gold medals in team, all-around, hoop, clubs and ribbon, and silver medal in ball.

In April 2019, Domingos competed at the World Cup Pesaro and took 47th place in the all-around. Then she competed at the World Cup Sofia, where she was 33rd in the all-around. She also attended World Cup Baku, where she was 39th in the all-around. At the end of May, she represented Brazil at the 2019 South American Championships in Bogotá, Colombia. She won a gold medal in ribbon, silver in all-around and clubs, and bronze in hoop and ball. In July, she competed at the 2019 Pan American Games in Lima, Peru, and won the silver medal in the ribbon final behind Evita Griskenas. On 6–8 September, she competed at the World Challenge Cup Portimão and took 16th place in the all-around.

At the 2019 World Championships in September, Domingos placed 31st in the all-around competition, which was the best finish by a Brazilian gymnast since the 1975 edition, and the best position achieved by an individual Brazilian gymnast in a fully attended World Championships.

=== 2021-22 ===
Domingos started her competition season at the World Cup Sofia, where she took 38th place in the all-around. She was 34th in all-around at the World Cup Tashkent and 31st at the World Cup Baku. In June, she became the 2021 Pan American Championships all-around silver medalist. She also won gold in team, ball and clubs and silver in hoop. This result meant that she fell short of winning a spot to compete at the 2020 Summer Olympics, which went to gold medalist Rut Castillo from Mexico.

At the 2021 World Championships, she had her highest-ever placement, finishing 13th in all-around qualifications and 17th in the all-around final. She was the first Brazilian to qualify to the all-around final. At the end of the year, she underwent surgery for a hip injury and was unable to train for six months.

In August, Domingos competed at the World Challenge Cup Cluj-Napoca and placed 30th in the all-around. On 14–18 September, she represented Brazil, alongside Geovanna Santos, at the 2022 World Championships in Sofia, Bulgaria. She ended 41st place in the all-around qualifications.

In October, she competed at the 2022 South American Games in Asunción, Paraguay. She won gold medals in the all-around, ball, clubs and ribbon, and a silver medal in hoop. In late November, she won team, all-around and ball gold medals at the 2022 South American Championships in Paipa, Colombia. In addition, she won silver in clubs and a bronze medal in the ribbon final.

=== 2023 ===
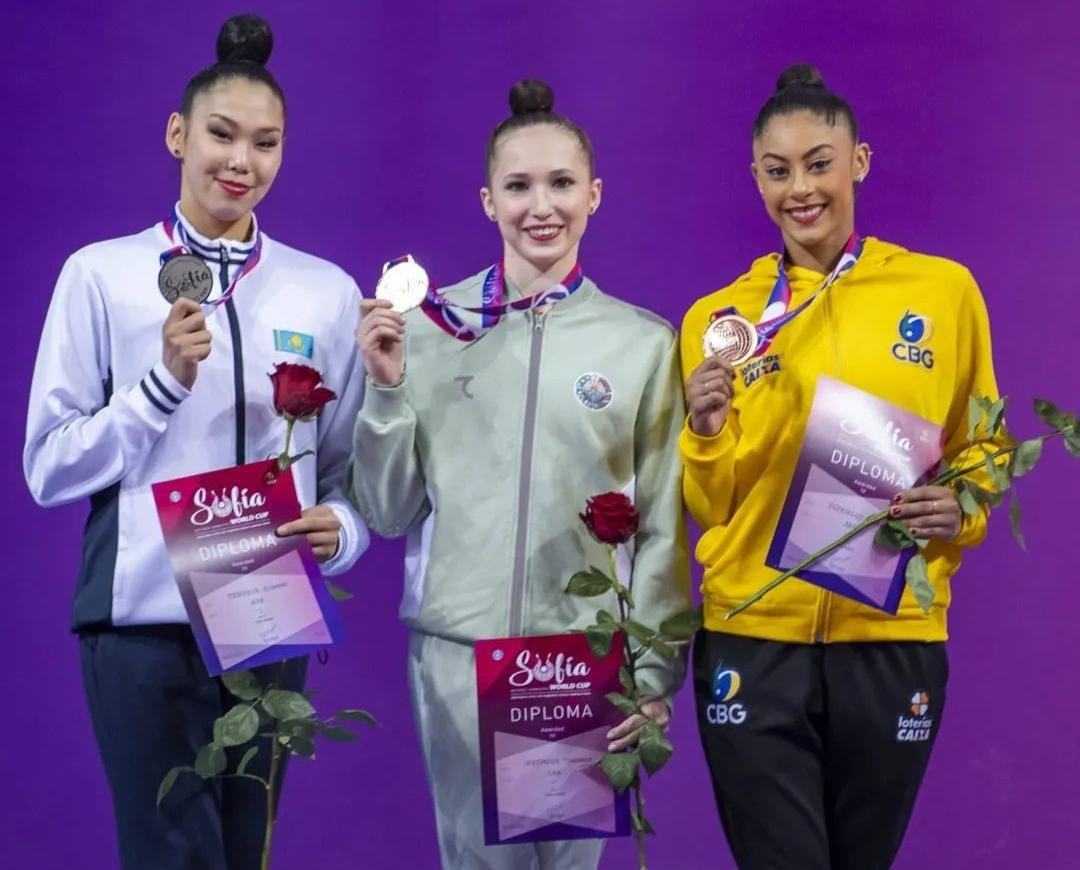
Domingos (right) on the 2023 World Cup Sofia ribbon podium with Takhmina Ikromova (center) and Elzhana Taniyeva (left).

On April 2, 2023, Domingos made history by winning bronze in the ribbon final at the World Cup in Sofia, becoming the first individual from her nation to medal in an event final in that type of competition. On 9 April, 2023, she also made history by winning gold in the ribbon final at the Grand Prix in Thiais, becoming the first Brazilian individual rhythmic gymnast to win a medal and a gold at the Grand Prix series.

At the 2023 World Championships in August, Domingos ended the all-around in 11th place. Her performance earned an individual berth for Brazil at the 2024 Summer Olympics. This was the first time a Brazilian rhythmic gymnasts had won a berth for the Olympics. Domingos said of the achievement, "What I feel today is a sense of fulfillment. That says it all." She was also the first Brazilian to qualify for an event final at the World Championships, as she qualified for the clubs final, where she finished in seventh place.

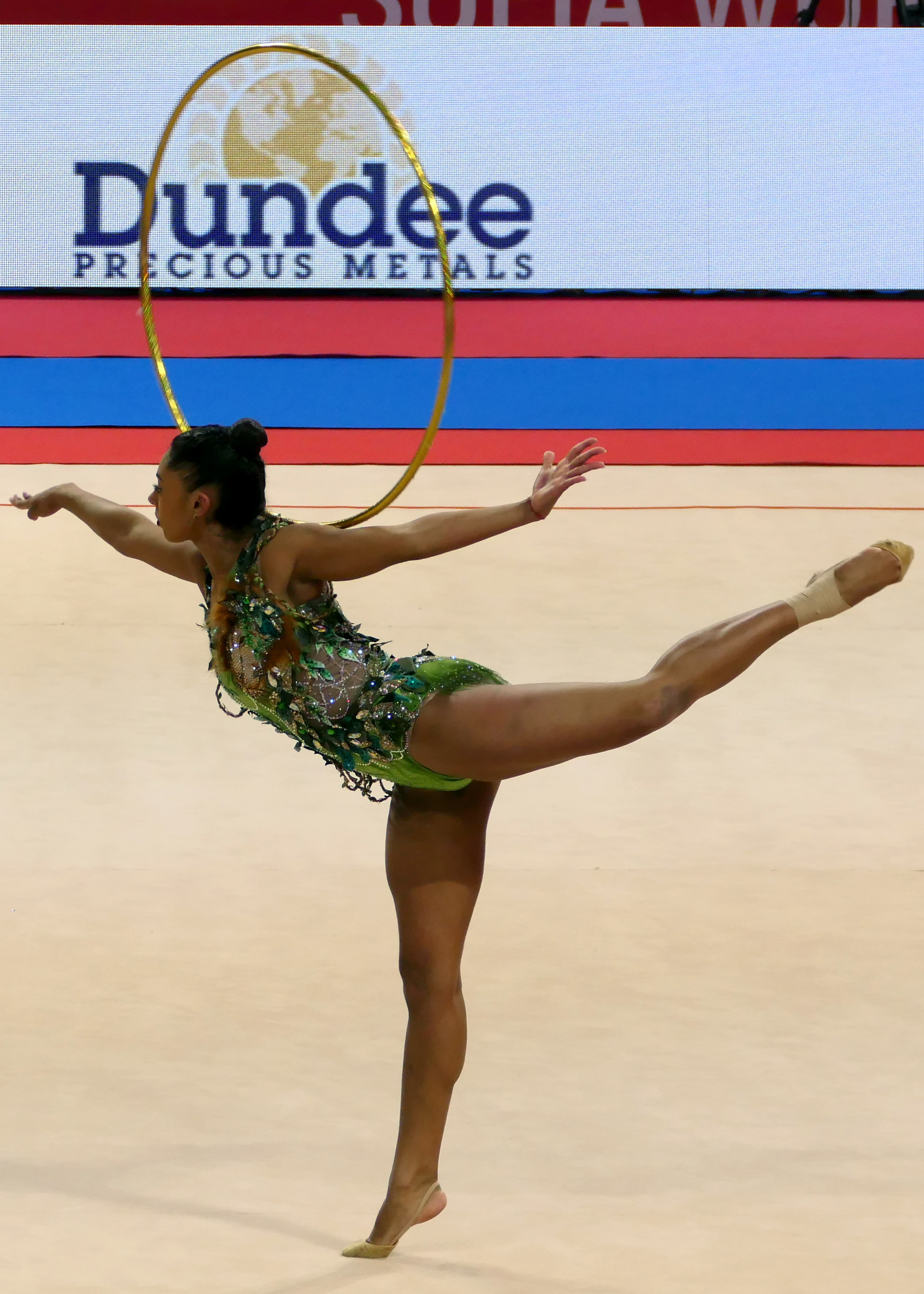
Domingos performing with the hoop at the 2024 Sofia World Cup

In September, Domingos competed at the Pan American Games in Santiago, winning gold in all-around, ball and ribbon, and silver in hoop and clubs. She was the first Brazilian to win the all-around gold and shared the podium with bronze medalist Maria Eduarda Alexandre, marking the first time two Brazilians made the all-around podium.

=== 2024 ===
Domingos began her 2024 season by competing at the Grand Prix in Thiais. She finished 10th in the all-around after dropping her apparatus in two routines and qualified for two event finals. At the World Cup in Sofia, she finished in 17th place and did not qualify for any finals.

At the 2024 Pan American Championships, Domingos defended her all-around title. She and the rest of the Brazilian gymnasts also won another team title. In the apparatus final, she won another gold in hoop and two silvers in clubs and ribbon. She said the competition served as preparation for the upcoming 2024 Summer Olympics. After that, she competed at the World Challenge Cup in Cluj-Napoca and won a bronze medal in the ribbon final.

At the 2024 Olympic Games in Paris, she became the first Brazilian to qualify for the final of the rhythmic gymnastics individual all-around after finishing 8th in the qualifying round. She was the only gymnast from the Americas in the final. During the final, she struggled with her first routine, hoop, including letting it fall of the podium at the end of her exercise. She also became entangled with the ribbon at the beginning of her ribbon routine. However, her other two routines were stronger. She said that despite the mistakes, she was proud to be one of the top ten gymnasts.

=== 2025 ===
In 2025, she competed at the Portimão World Challenge Cup, taking 9th place in all-around. At the Pan American Championships, she won silver in the all-around, as well as silver in the team competition. In the apparatus finals, she won silver with ball and clubs and bronze medals in hoop and ribbon. In June, she won the Brazilian all-around title in front of Geovanna Santos. The next month, she competed at the Milan World Cup and qualified to three apparatus finals. She finished 6th in ball and 7th in both the hoop and ribbon finals.

In August, she represented Brazil, alongside Geovanna Santos, at the 2025 World Championships in front of her home crowd. Together with the senior group, they took 4th place in the team competition. She also finished in 9th place in the all-around final.

=== 2026 ===
In April, Domingos competed at the Tashkent World Cup, taking 14th place in the all-around. She qualified to the ball and clubs finals, finishing 8th in both. At the Baku World Cup, she took 17th place in the all-around. In June, she represented Brazil at the 2026 Pan American Championships in Rio de Janeiro alongside Maria Eduarda Alexandre and Geovanna Santos. They won gold in the team competition, and Domingos won another gold in the all-around.

In July, she competed at the Milan World Cup and took 10th place in the all-around.

== Personal life ==
In early January 2026, she announced that she got engaged to her boyfriend, Eduardo Balzer.

== Achievements ==
- First Brazilian rhythmic gymnast to qualify for an individual final (all-around) at the World Championships.
- First Brazilian individual rhythmic gymnast to qualify for an apparatus final at the World Championships.
- First Brazilian individual rhythmic gymnast to qualify for an apparatus final at the FIG World Cup series.
- First Brazilian individual rhythmic gymnast to win a medal at the FIG World Cup series.
- First Brazilian individual rhythmic gymnast to win a medal at the FIG World Challenge Cup series.
- First Brazilian individual rhythmic gymnast to win a medal of any kind (gold) at the Rhythmic Gymnastics Grand Prix circuit.
- First Brazilian rhythmic gymnast to qualify for an individual final (all-around) at the Olympic Games.

== Routine music information ==
| Year | Apparatus | Music Title |
|---|---|---|
| 2026 | Hoop | Live Like Legends by Ruelle |
| 2026 | Ball | Never Tear Us Apart (from Fifty Shades Freed) by Bishop Briggs |
| 2026 | Clubs | Can't Get You out of My Head by Kylie Minogue |
| 2026 | Ribbon | Aquele abraço / Refazenda by Gilberto Gil |
| 2025 | Hoop | Circle Of Life by Carmen Twillie, Lebo M. |
| 2025 | Ball | Never Tear Us Apart (from Fifty Shades Freed) by Bishop Briggs |
| 2025 | Clubs | The Girl from Ipanema by Elise Trouw / Batucada Samba Enredo 2 by MML Latin / Garota de Ipanema by Melim |
| 2025 | Ribbon (first) | El Tango de Roxanne by José Feliciano & Ewan McGregror & Jacek Koman |
| 2025 | Ribbon (second) | Aquele abraço / Refazenda by Gilberto Gil |
| 2024 | Hoop | Circle Of Life by Carmen Twillie, Lebo M. |
| 2024 | Ball | Je Suis Malade by Lara Fabian |
| 2024 | Clubs | The Girl from Ipanema by Elise Trouw / Batucada Samba Enredo 2 by MML Latin / Garota de Ipanema by Melim |
| 2024 | Ribbon | Backstage Romance by Ricky Rojas & Robyn Hurder & Original Broadway Cast of Moulin Rouge! The Musical |
| 2023 | Hoop | Circle Of Life by Carmen Twillie, Lebo M. |
| 2023 | Ball | Warriors by League of Legends Music, 2WEI, Edda Hayes |
| 2023 | Clubs | The Girl from Ipanema by Elise Trouw / Batucada Samba Enredo 2 by MML Latin / Garota de Ipanema by Melim |
| 2023 | Ribbon | Backstage Romance by Ricky Rojas & Robyn Hurder & Original Broadway Cast of Moulin Rouge! The Musical |
