= Ledia Juárez =

Mexican rhythmic gymnast (born 2001)

- Full name: Ledia Damaris Juárez Alardo
- Born: 29 August 2001 (age 25) Tamaulipas, Mexico

Gymnastics career
- Discipline: Rhythmic gymnastics
- Country represented: Mexico; (2014–)
- Club: Escuela Municipal de Gimnasia Ritmica UNIDEP
- Head coach: Efrossina Angelova
Medal record
Rhythmic Gymnastics
Representing Mexico
Pan American Championships
Silver medal – second place	2017 Daytona Beach	Team
Silver medal – second place	2021 Rio de Janeiro	Team
Central American and Caribbean Games
Gold medal – first place	2023 San Salvador	Team
Gold medal – first place	2023 San Salvador	Clubs
Silver medal – second place	2018 Barranquilla	Ball
Silver medal – second place	2023 San Salvador	Ball
Silver medal – second place	2023 San Salvador	Ribbon
Bronze medal – third place	2023 San Salvador	All-Around
Junior Pan American Championships
Gold medal – first place	2016 Merida	Clubs
Silver medal – second place	2014 Daytona Beach	Team
Silver medal – second place	2016 Merida	Team
Silver medal – second place	2016 Merida	Rope
Silver medal – second place	2016 Merida	Ball
Bronze medal – third place	2016 Merida	All-Around

Ledia Damaris Juárez Alardo (Note: In this Spanish name, the first or paternal surname is Juárez and the second or maternal family name is Alardo.) (born 29 August 2001) is a Mexican rhythmic gymnast. She's a multiple Pan American medalist.

== Personal life ==
Ledia was born into a family with a rhythmic gymnastics tradition as her mother is a coach and her aunt is a judge. At an early age she was in training sessions and after watching the girls practising the sport she wanted to imitate them, taking up the sport at age four. Her dream is to compete at the Olympic Games. She was named the 2016 Athlete of the Year in Tampico. She's studying international relationships at the Anahuac University.

== Career ==
=== Junior ===
She made her international debut at the 2014 Pacif Rim Gymnastics Championships where she was 6th in teams and 15th in the All-Around. At the Junior Pan American Rhythmic Gymnastics Championships she won silver in teams.

In 2016, at the Pan American Championships she won silver in teams, bronze in the All-Around and with rope and ball as well as gold with clubs.

=== Senior ===
At the 2017 Pan American Championship she won silver in teams along Marina Malpica and Karla Diaz behind the United States.

In 2018 she competed in two World Cup stages: Guadalajara where she took 40th place in the All-Around, 48th with hoop, 44th with ball, 32nd with clubs, 32nd with ribbon and Portimão 28th in the All-Around, 35th with hoop, 31st with ball, 16th with clubs and 27th with ribbon.

She was again in Guadalajara for the World Cup, being 32nd in the All-Around, 32nd with hoop, 20th with ball, 30th with clubs and 43rd with ribbon. In September she was selected for her maiden World Championships in Baku to perform with clubs, with which she finished in 80th place.

At the 2021 Pan American Championships she won silver in teams behind Brazil along Rut Castillo and Karla Diaz. In October she competed with hoop and ribbon at the World Championships in Kitakyushu, finishing 38th and 56th.

During the 2022 season she was at the World Cup in Portimão, where she was 25th in the All-Around, 20th with hoop, 35th with ball, 24th with clubs and 23rd with ribbon.

In 2023 she started at the World Cup in Baku ending 48th in the All-Around, 54th with hoop, 48th with ball, 35th with clubs and 30th with ribbon. At the 2023 Central American and Caribbean Games in San Salvador she won gold in teams along Marina Malpica and Karla Diaz, bronze in the All-Around, silver with ball and ribbon and gold with clubs. At the 2023 Pan American Games in Santiago, Chile, she was 10th in the All-Around and 7th with hoop final.
