= Lili Mizuno =

American rhythmic gymnast

- Born: February 4, 2001 (age 25) Kawasaki, Japan

Gymnastics career
- Discipline: Rhythmic gymnastics
- Country represented: United States; (2015-Present)
- Club: North Shore Rhythmic Gymnastics Center
Medal record
Representing the United States
| Event | 1st | 2nd | 3rd |
|---|---|---|---|
| Pan American Championships | 2 | 5 | 1 |
| FIG World Cup | 0 | 0 | 1 |
| Total | 2 | 5 | 2 |
Pan American Championships
| Gold medal – first place | 2017 Daytona Beach | Team |
| Gold medal – first place | 2018 Lima | Team |
| Silver medal – second place | 2017 Daytona Beach | All-around |
| Silver medal – second place | 2017 Daytona Beach | Hoop |
| Silver medal – second place | 2017 Daytona Beach | Ball |
| Silver medal – second place | 2017 Daytona Beach | Ribbon |
| Silver medal – second place | 2018 Lima | Hoop |
| Bronze medal – third place | 2021 Rio de Janeiro | Group All-around |

Lili Mizuno (born February 4, 2001) is an American rhythmic gymnast. She is the Pan American Championships 2021 Group All-around bronze medalist and 2017 All-around silver medalist. She competed in the group all-around at the 2020 Summer Olympics, finishing eleventh in qualification.

== Gymnastics career ==
=== Junior ===
Mizuno began training in rhythmic gymnastics when she was eight years old, after an artistic gymnastics coach suggested it. She initially trained at Rhythmic Gymnastics Academy East Bay in California.

Mizuno joined the junior national team in 2015. In 2016, she moved from California to Illinois to train at North Shore Rhythmic Gymnastics Center.

In February 2016 she made her international debut at the Alina Cup in Moscow, finishing fourth in clubs with a score of 15.400. At the Pacific Rim Championships in April, Mizuno won the junior all-around. She took gold in all four apparatus finals as well. In June at the USA Gymnastics Championships, Mizuno won gold in hoops and clubs, silver in all-around and rope, and placed fourth in ball.

=== Senior ===
==== 2017 ====
Mizuno joined the senior national team in 2017. In March, she competed at the Rhythmic Challenge in Indianapolis, Indiana, winning gold in ball and bronze in all-around. At the end of March, she was assigned to three international competitions: Marbella Grand Prix in Marbella, Spain from March 31-April 2; Sofia International Tournament in Sofia, Bulgaria in May; and Guadalajara World Challenge Cup in Guadalajara, Spain from June 2–4. At the US Gymnastics Championships in June, she won clubs silver behind Olympian Laura Zeng. Mizuno competed at the Pan American Championships in October, capturing silver in hoop, ball, ribbon and all-around, behind teammate Evita Griskenas.

==== 2018 ====
At the 2018 Rhythmic Challenge in February, Mizuno was third all-around with a score of 63.800. At the end of March, Mizuno was assigned to four international competitions: Sofia International Tournament from March 30-April 1; Baku World Cup in Baku, Azerbaijan from April 27–29; Guadalajara World Challenge Cup from May 4–6; and Portimao World Challenge Cup in Portimao, Portugal from May 11–13. In July at the US Gymnastics Championships, Mizuno was fourth in clubs and fifth all-around. At the Pan American Championships in September, she won silver in hoop, behind teammate Laura Zeng and ahead of Mexico's Marina Malpica.

==== 2019 ====
Mizuno captured gold in all-around and ball, plus silver in hoop, clubs and ribbon at the Rhythmic Challenge in February. In March she competed at MTM Ljubljana International Tournament in Ljubljana, Slovenia, finishing fifth all-around. At the Pesaro World Cup in Pesaro, Italy, from April 5–7, Mizuno finished 35th all-around, far behind fellow American Evita Griskenas, who finished sixth. At the Tashkent World Cup in Tashkent, Uzbekistan on April 19–21, she finished 17th all-around and did not advance to any apparatus finals. At the US Gymnastics Championships in July, she won ball bronze with a score of 18.800, behind Laura Zeng and Evita Griskenas. Mizuno competed at the Kazan World Challenge Cup in Kazan, Russia from August 30-September 1, placing 28th all-around. At Japan's AEON Cup in October, the American team finished eighth and Mizuno finished fifteenth all-around.

==== 2020 ====
Mizuno started her 2020 season in February at the Rhythmic Challenge in Lake Placid, New York. Mizuno placed fourth all-around, behind Lennox Hopkins-Williams and ahead of Elena Shinohara. She was third with ball, fourth in hoop and ribbon, and seventh in clubs. The 2020 season was curtailed by the COVID-19 pandemic, and Mizuno, frustrated by three consecutive fifth-place finishes at the U.S. national championships, considered quitting the sport. However, in autumn 2020, Mizuno was invited to train with the national senior group, which had lost a member and needed a replacement, an experience that she said was enjoyable and invigorating.

==== 2021 ====
In 2021, Mizuno competed as a member of the United States senior group, winning both the 2021 Rhythmic Challenge and 2021 USA Gymnastics Championships. She was selected to represent the United States at the 2020 Summer Olympics alongside Camilla Feeley, Isabelle Connor, Nicole Sladkov, and Elizaveta Pletneva. They finished eleventh in the qualification round for the group all-around.

==== 2022 ====
Mizuno returned to competing as an individual gymnast in 2022. She won gold at the 2022 Rhythmic Challenge, the first national competition of the season. Her first international competition of the year was Marbella Grand Prix in March, where she finished fifth with hoop, sixth in all-around and clubs, and seventh with ball and ribbon. At the Sofia World Cup she placed sixth all-around, and at the Baku World Cup she was sixth with ball. She was sixth with clubs at the Pamplona World Challenge Cup. In May, Mizuno was third with ball and fifth with clubs at the Portimao World Challenge Cup. In June, she competed at the USA Gymnastics Championships, winning silver in all-around, behind Evita Griskenas and ahead of Erica Foster. At the 2022 World Games in Birmingham, she was seventh in ribbon and eighth with ball. At the Cluj-Napoca World Challenge Cup in August, Mizuno finished 17th all-around. In September at the 2022 World Championships, she contributed to the United States team's fifth place finish with her 12th place finish in the all-around. In October, at the Aeon Cup in Japan, she was eighth all-around and helped the United States team capture bronze.

==== 2023 ====
Mizuno began the season in February at the 2023 Rhythmic Challenge, coming second in the all-around behind Evita Griskenas, and first in clubs and ribbon. The Aphrodite Cup in March was Mizuno's first international competition of the season - she was fourth in the all-around and picked up a bronze medal in ball, and she was fifth in ribbon and eighth with hoop. The next week at the Faliro World Cup, Mizuno was injured during her qualification clubs routine and withdrew from the competition. She returned to competition in June at the 2023 Pharaoh's Cup in Cairo, Egypt, winning four medals: gold in ball and ribbon, and silver for hoop and clubs. Later that month, at the USA Gymnastics Championships, Mizuno became the individual all-around champion, ahead of Alexandria Kautzman. In July at the Cluj-Napoca World Challenge Cup in Romania, Mizuno finished 13th all-around and additionally placed fifth in ball and eighth in hoop. She was 27th all-around at the Milan World Cup later that month.

At the Rhythmic World Championships in August, Mizuno contributed to the United States team's 14th place finish. She did not qualify to any finals, finishing 32nd in the all-around. In September at the Aeon Cup, she was 11th all-around and the United States team was fifth. Competing at the 2023 Pan American Games, Mizuno finished fourth in the ribbon final, behind bronze medalist Evita Griskenas. In December, she was named USA Gymnastics' Sportsperson of the year in rhythmic gymnastics.

==== 2024 ====
At the 2024 Rhythmic Challenge, Mizuno came in third in the all-around and won with the ribbon. She was assigned the 2024 World Cup in Sofia but withdrew before the competition.

== Personal life ==
Mizuno graduated from high school in 2019.

== Routine music information ==
| Year | Apparatus | Music title |
|---|---|---|
| 2023 | Hoop | Mind Demons / The Afflicted by Audiomachine |
| 2023 | Ball | Maison en Feu by Jules Buckley, Metropole Orkest, Bókante |
| 2023 | Clubs | Spice Up Your Life by Spice Girls |
| 2023 | Ribbon | Animus by Sarah Álainn |
| 2022 | Hoop | Liberi Fatali by Nobuo Uematsu |
| 2022 | Ball | Mangta Hai Kya by A. H. Rakhman, Shwetha Shetty |
| 2022 | Clubs | Gunmetal Black by Varíen |
| 2022 | Ribbon | Piano Sonata No. 23 in F Minor, Op. 57 "Appassionata": III. Allegro ma non troppo by Lang Lang |
| 2021 | Hoop | Lacrimosa by David Garrett, Royal Philharmonic Orchestra & Franck van der Heijden |
| 2021 | Ball | Unsaleable Strings by Club des Belugas |
| 2021 | Clubs | Spitfire by Infected Mushroom |
| 2021 | Ribbon | Amar: Mongolia by Armand Amar |
