= Gretel Mendoza =

Cuban rhythmic gymnast

- Full name: Gretel Adelaida Mendoza Ramírez
- Born: 14 April 2000 (age 26)
- Height: 1.66 m (5 ft 5 in)

Gymnastics career
- Discipline: Rhythmic gymnastics
- Country represented: Cuba (2017–)
Medal record
Rhythmic gymnastics
Representing Cuba
Central American and Caribbean Games
Bronze medal – third place	2023 San Salvador	Ribbon

Gretel Adelaida Mendoza Ramírez (born 14 April 2000) is a Cuban rhythmic gymnast. She earned the bronze medal with ribbon at the 2023 Central American and Caribbean Games.

== Early life ==
Mendoza was born 14 April 2000 in Yara, Cuba. She has a younger brother. Mendoza began gymnastics when she was five.

== Career ==
In 2015, she won four medals at the Cuban senior national championships and five at the junior level, four of which were gold. In 2017, she won all five possible gold medals at the Cuban national championships.

Mendoza competed at the 2018 Central American and Caribbean Games. She also competed at the 2018 Pan American Championships, where she was 14th in the all-around. The next year, she competed at the 2019 Pan American Games and placed 13th.

In 2022, she placed 18th at the 2022 Pan American Championships.

In 2023, Mendoza spent time training in Russia and competed as a guest at the Russian national championships. Training there gave her the opportunity to compete at the World Cup stages in Tashkent (where she placed 30th in the all-around) and Baku (where she placed 41st). She returned to compete at the Pan American Championships in June, where she placed 9th, and the Central American and Caribbean Games in July, where she won the bronze medal in the ribbon final and was sixth in the all-around. In August, she competed at the CIS Games, where she placed 11th. In November, she competed at the Pan American Games, where she was the only Cuban rhythmic gymnast competing. She finished in 16th place in the all-around qualifications and did not advance to the final.
