= Evita Griskenas =

American individual rhythmic gymnast

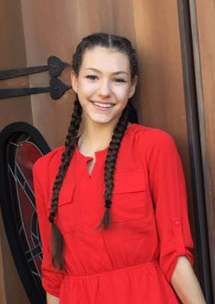
- Griskenas at Tokyo Disneyland in 2019

Personal information
- Born: December 3, 2000 (age 25) Chicago, Illinois, U.S.
- Height: 5 ft 8 in (173 cm)

Gymnastics career
- Discipline: Rhythmic gymnastics
- Country represented: United States
- Club: North Shore Rhythmic Gymnastics Center
- Head coach: Natalia Klimouk
- Assistant coaches: Angelina Yovcheva, Dani Takova
Medal record
Rhythmic Gymnastics
Representing United States
Event	1st	2nd	3rd
FIG World Challenge Cup	0	3	1
FIG World Cup	0	0	1
Grand Prix	0	0	2
Total	0	3	4
Grand Prix Final
Bronze medal – third place	2024 Brno	Ribbon
Pan American Games
Gold medal – first place	2019 Lima	All-around
Gold medal – first place	2019 Lima	Hoop
Gold medal – first place	2019 Lima	Ball
Gold medal – first place	2019 Lima	Ribbon
Silver medal – second place	2023 Santiago	All-around
Bronze medal – third place	2019 Lima	Clubs
Bronze medal – third place	2023 Santiago	Hoop
Bronze medal – third place	2023 Santiago	Ball
Bronze medal – third place	2023 Santiago	Clubs
Bronze medal – third place	2023 Santiago	Ribbon
Pan American Championships
Gold medal – first place	2017 Daytona Beach	Team
Gold medal – first place	2017 Daytona Beach	All-around
Gold medal – first place	2017 Daytona Beach	Hoop
Gold medal – first place	2017 Daytona Beach	Ball
Gold medal – first place	2017 Daytona Beach	Clubs
Gold medal – first place	2017 Daytona Beach	Ribbon
Gold medal – first place	2022 Rio de Janeiro	Team
Gold medal – first place	2022 Rio de Janeiro	All-around
Silver medal – second place	2023 Guadalajara	Team
Bronze medal – third place	2023 Guadalajara	All-around
Bronze medal – third place	2023 Guadalajara	Hoop

Evita Griskenas OLY (/ɛˈviːtə ɡrɪʃˈkɛnəs/ eh-VEE-tə grish-KEN-əss; born December 3, 2000) is an American individual rhythmic gymnast. She represented the United States at the 2024 Summer Olympics and the 2020 Summer Olympics. At the 2023 Portimao World Challenge Cup, she became the first American to win an all-around silver medal on the Rhythmic Gymnastics World Cup series.

On national level, she is the 2022 USA national all-around champion, a four-time national all-around silver medalist (2017, 2018, 2019, 2021), and the 2015 junior national all-around champion.

Griskenas was the most decorated athlete at the 2019 Pan American Games with four gold medals and one bronze medal, and she won five medals at the 2023 Pan American Games. She swept the gold medals at the 2017 Pan American Championships and is also the 2022 Pan American all-around champion. She is the 2024 Grand Prix Brno Final ribbon bronze medalist.

== Early life ==
Griskenas was born in Chicago and raised in Orland Park, Illinois. Her parents, Sigitas and Olga Griškėnas, are immigrants from Lithuania. Sigitas was the 1997 and 1999 World Fitness Champion, and Olga finished in fifth place in Fitness Aerobics in 1997 and fourth in 1999. She has a younger brother named Nathan. She began rhythmic gymnastics at the age of four after watching Alina Kabaeva competing on television.

She enrolled in Columbia University in 2020; due to a lack of training facilities, she typically traveled each week between New York to attend classes and Chicago to train at her gym. She graduated with a degree in psychology in 2024.

== Career ==
=== Junior ===
Griskenas competed at the 2013 U.S. Rhythmic Championships and placed 10th in hoop, 15th in ball, 12th in clubs, and eighth in ribbon. She then finished 11th in the all-around final. At the 2014 Rhythmic Challenge in Colorado Springs, Colorado, she finished fourth in clubs, fifth in ribbon, and seventh in the all-around, hoop, and ball. Then at the 2014 National Qualifier in Lake Placid, New York, she won the bronze medal in the all-around and qualified for the USA Gymnastics Championships. There, she finished fifth in ribbon, sixth in hoop and clubs, seventh in the all-around, and 10th in ball.

In February 2015, Griskenas made her international debut and finished third in the all-around at the Moscow Grand Prix Junior International Tournament. Then in March, she won the gold medals in the all-around, ball, and clubs, and silver medals in the hoop and rope at the Rhythmic Challenge. She competed at the Lisbon International Tournament and won the bronze medals in the hoop and clubs finals. She also finished fourth in ball and seventh in rope. She then won the all-around gold medal at the International Rhythmic Gymnastics Tournament held in Corbeil-Essonnes. At the National Qualifier, she won gold medals in the all-around, rope, ball, and clubs, and the bronze medal in hoop. She then won the junior all-around title at the USA Gymnastics Championships. She also won the gold medal in hoop, the silver medals in ball and clubs, and the bronze medal in rope.

=== Senior ===
==== 2016 ====
Griskenas made her senior debut at the Espoo World Cup and finished 21st in the all-around. At the Rhythmic Challenge, she finished second in the all-around. Then at the Lisbon World Cup, she once again finished 21st in the all-around. She then finished 28th in the all-around at the Pesaro World Cup. At the Brno Grand Prix, she placed eighth in ball, ninth in ribbon, and 12th in the all-around, hoop, and clubs. She won the gold medal in the all-around at the National Qualifier and qualified for the USA Gymnastics Championships where she finished fourth. In the event finals, she won the bronze medal in hoop and the silver medal in ribbon.

==== 2017 ====
At the Rhythmic Challenge, Griskenas won the all-around silver medal. Then at the Pesaro World Cup, she finished 17th in the all-around. She then placed sixth in the all-around and ribbon and seventh in the hoop at the Baku World Cup. At the Sofia World Cup, she placed fifth in the ball final and eighth in the hoop final. She won the silver medal in the all-around at the USA Gymnastics Championships, and won the event titles in hoop and ribbon. In August, she competed at the Kazan World Challenge Cup and finished 15th in the all-around. She then competed at her first World Championships in Pesaro, Italy. In the all-around final, she placed 11th, which was the fourth highest-ever finish for an American gymnast at the Rhythmic Gymnastics World Championships. She also advanced into both the ribbon and hoop finals along with Laura Zeng, marking the first time two American gymnasts advanced to the event finals at the World Championships. In the event finals, she finished eighth in the hoop and seventh in the ribbon. After the World Championships, she won the all-around gold medal and gold in all four apparatus finals at the Pan American Championship in Daytona Beach, Florida.

==== 2018 ====
Griskenas made her season debut at the Sofia World Cup and placed ninth in the all-around and sixth in the hoop and ball event finals. Then at the Pesaro World Cup, she placed eighth in the all-around, sixth in hoop, and seventh in ribbon. She then competed at the Guadalajara World Challenge Cup and finished sixth in ribbon, seventh in hoop, eighth in clubs, and 10th in the all-around. She won the silver medal in the all-around at the USA Gymnastics Championships, and she won the gold medal in the ball final. In August, she competed at the BSB Bank World Challenge Cup in Minsk and finished 16th in the all-around. The next week she competed at the Kazan World Challenge Cup where she placed eighth in the ribbon final and 13th in the all-around. At the World Championships, Griskenas, Laura Zeng, and Camilla Feeley finished seventh in the team event, the highest ever finish for the United States. Individually, she qualified for the all-around final and placed 17th with a total score of 66.950. After the World Championships, she competed at the AEON Cup in Takasaki and placed fifth in the all-around and in the team competition.

==== 2019 ====
Griskenas began her 2019 season at the Corbeil International Tournament in Corbeil-Essonnes, France and helped the American team win the bronze medal. Individually, she won the all-around bronze medal behind Belarusian gymnasts Alina Harnasko and Julia Evchik. In the event finals, she won the gold medal in the ball, the silver medal in ribbon behind Harnasko, and the bronze in clubs behind Talisa Torretti and Harnasko. Then at the MTM Ljubljana International Tournament, she won the all-around silver medal behind Italy's Alexandra Agiurgiuculese. She also won the hoop gold medal and the ball silver medal once again behind Agiurgiuculese. Her first World Cup of the season was in Pesaro, and she placed fifth in the ribbon, sixth in the all-around, and eighth in the hoop and ball. Then at the Sofia World Cup, she finished fifth in the hoop, sixth in the all-around and ribbon, and seventh in clubs. In May, she won the all-around silver medal behind teammate Camilla Feeley at the Rhythmic Elite Qualifier. She then competed at the Holon Grand Prix where she placed fifth all-around, sixth in ball, and seventh in hoop and ribbon. She won her third consecutive national all-around silver medal at the USA Gymnastics Championships.

Griskenas was selected to represent the United States at the 2019 Pan American Games and won five medals- gold in the all-around, ball, hoop, and ribbon, and bronze in clubs. She was the most decorated athlete in any sport at the 2019 Pan American Games. Then at the Kazan World Cup, she placed fifth in the ribbon final and eighth in the all-around. At the World Championships in Baku, Azerbaijan, the American team of Griskenas, Laura Zeng, and Camilla Feeley placed seventh. Individually, Griskenas qualified for the ball final and placed eighth with a score of 20.350. She also qualified for the all-around final where she placed eighth with a total score of 83.000. She secured one of two Olympic spots for Team USA for the 2020 Olympic Games, along with Laura Zeng, marking the first time since 1992 that the United States qualified two individual rhythmic gymnasts for the Olympics.

==== 2020-21 ====
Griskenas won the all-around silver medal at the 2020 Rhythmic Challenge in Lake Placid, New York. Then in March 2020, she placed fourth in all-around at the Grand Prix Brno, and she won the bronze medal in the ball final behind Ukrainians Vlada Nikolchenko and Yeva Meleshchuk. This was her final competition of 2020 due to the COVID-19 pandemic. She trained in her basement while her training center was closed. She returned to competition in February 2021 at the Rhythmic Challenge and won the all-around gold medal by more than four points ahead of Laura Zeng.

Griskenas competed at several events on the 2021 World Cup series. First in Sofia, she placed 27th in the all-around. Next in Tashkent, she finished 20th. Then in Baku, she placed 23rd in the all-around. At her final World Cup in Pesaro, she finished 18th. She finished second in the all-around at the 2021 USA Gymnastics Championships and was selected to represent the United States at the 2020 Summer Olympics. Her final competition prior to the Olympics was the Israel International Tournament, where she swept the gold medals in the all-around and in all four events.

At the 2020 Olympic Games in Tokyo, Griskenas was the highest-placing rhythmic gymnast from Team USA, finishing 12th in the qualification round for the individual all-around, and was the second reserve for the all-around final. After the Olympics, she competed at the 2021 World Championships and helped the American team place ninth.

==== 2022 ====
Griskenas competed in two events at the USA Rhythmic Challenge and won the gold medal in ball and the silver medal in clubs. At the Baku World Cup, she placed eighth in the all-around, ball, and ribbon. She won her first World Cup medal at the Portimão World Challenge Cup with a bronze in the ribbon final.

Griskenas won her first senior national all-around title at the USA Gymnastics Championships by nearly twelve points, and she also won gold in hoop and clubs and silver in ball and ribbon. At the Pan American Championships in Rio de Janeiro, she won all-around gold medal by more than two points and helped secure a gold team medal for the US. Although she qualified for event finals, Griskenas departed the event after the all-around competition to compete in the World Games, which were happening the same week. At the World Games in Birmingham, Alabama, she placed fifth in ribbon and seventh in hoop. Griskenas competed at the 2022 World Championships in Sofia, Bulgaria and placed 10th in the all-around final while leading the American team to a fifth-place finish. She also advanced to the hoop final, finishing in seventh place.

==== 2023 ====
At the USA Rhythmic Challenge, Griskenas won the all-around gold medal, as well as gold in hoop and ball, silver in clubs, and bronze in ribbon. In Athens, Greece, at the Aphrodite Cup, she placed second in the all-around competition and earned the gold medals in clubs and ribbon, and the bronze medal in hoop. At her first World Cup of the season, the Faliro World Cup in Athens, Greece, Griskenas placed ninth all-around. She earned her first World Cup bronze medal in ball and placed sixth in ribbon.

Griskenas made Team USA history at the Portimão World Challenge Cup in Portimão, Portugal, by earning a silver all-around medal, the highest all-around finish ever on the Rhythmic Gymnastics World Cup series by an American rhythmic gymnast. Griskenas advanced to all four event finals, winning additional silver medals in hoop and clubs, plus finishing fourth in ball and fifth in ribbon. She placed third all-around at the Pan American Championships in Guadalajara, Mexico, leading the team to a second-place finish. She qualified for all four event finals, but after earning the bronze medal in hoop, withdrew from the other events due to a broken foot.

Griskenas did not compete at the USA Gymnastics Championships due to the injury, but she was named to the USA Rhythmic Gymnastics National Team and World Championships Team, via petition. At the World Championships in Valencia, Spain, she finished 28th in the qualification round and did not qualify for the all-around final. At the 2023 Pan American Games, she won the all-around silver medal and received an individual quota to compete at the 2024 Olympic Games. Additionally, she won the bronze medals in all four event finals.

==== 2024 ====
Griskenas returned to training in February after spending several months healing from her broken foot. She began the Olympic season at the Portimão World Challenge Cup, finishing 17th in the all-around. She also qualified for the ribbon final and placed sixth. Then at the Grand Prix Final in Brno, Czech Republic, she placed fourth in the all-around. In the ribbon final, she won a bronze medal behind Bulgaria's Elvira Krasnobaeva and Ukraine's Taisiia Onofriichuk. She also placed fifth in the ball final and ninth in the hoop final.

In August, Griskenas competed at the 2024 Summer Olympics. She finished in 18th place in the qualification round and did not advance to the final. Afterward, she indicated that she intended to continue training and that she hoped to compete at the 2028 Summer Olympics.

==== 2025 ====
In April, she competed at the Tashkent World Cup, where she ended 11th place in the all-around. She qualified to the ball and ribbon finals, finishing 4th in both. On 17-19 July, she represented United States at the 2025 Summer Universiade in Essen, Germany. She finished 10th in the all-around. In the apparatus finals, she was 7th in clubs and 8th in ribbon.

==== 2026 ====
Griskenas started the competition season competing at Miss Valentine Grand Prix in Tartu, Estonia. She took 9th place in the all-around. In addition, she was 5th in the clubs and ribbon finals. In March, she competed at Marbella Grand Prix and finished 15th place in the all-around. She qualified to two apparatus finals, finishing 8th in clubs and 6th in ribbon. In April, she competed at the Tashkent World Cup and placed 19th in the all-around.

== Awards ==
In December 2019, Griskenas was honored as the NextGen Female (U-20) at the inaugural Panam Sports Awards. She was named one of ten finalists for the 90th Annual AAU James E. Sullivan Award in March 2020.

USA Gymnastics awarded Griskenas the title of Athlete of the Year in 2022 and 2023. In 2022, Griskenas was elected to the Athletes' Council of USA Gymnastics, serving as an advocate for elite athletes in USA Gymnastics.

== Eponymous skill ==
Griskenas has one eponymous skill listed in the code of points, which consists of an open Sakura turn with help. She performed it for the first time at the Tashkent World Cup in 2026, and it was added to the code of points the same year in June. Griskenas became the first-ever American rhythmic gymnast to have an eponymous skill.

Skill name	Description	Base rotation	Base value (Note: Base value in the 2025-2028 Code of Points)
Griskenas	Back split with help, trunk forward at the horizontal, with open (>90°) ring. The hand which holds the open ring should be straight	360°	0.4

== Personal life ==
Griskenas graduated from Carl Sandburg High School and Stanford Online High School in 2019. After graduating from high school, she took a gap year before enrolling full time at Columbia University in New York, where she studied psychology with underlying interests in social behavior and vision. She graduated in May 2024. Her goal is to earn a PhD and become a sports psychologist. Her hobbies include practicing calligraphy, writing, reading and dancing. She speaks English, Lithuanian and Russian.

== Routine music information ==
Year	Apparatus	Music title
2026	Hoop	Song for the Little Sparrow (Ouverture) by Patricia Kaas
2026	Ball	Tiny Riot (Orchestral Version) by Sam Ryder
2026	Clubs	Take Me To The Water by David Gerard Lawrence, Samuel Kenneth Brookes
2026	Ribbon	The New Orleans Tango (2024) by Tony DeSare
2025	Hoop	Piano Concerto No. 2 in C Minor, Op. 18: 1. Moderato by Valentina Lisitsa, London Symphony Orchestra & Michael Francis
2025	Ball	Why Don't You Do Right by Beth Hart & Joe Bonamassa
2025	Clubs	I Got It by Ryan Innes
2025	Ribbon	The New Orleans Tango (2024) by Tony DeSare
2024	Hoop	Piano Concerto No. 2 in C Minor, Op. 18: 1. Moderato by Valentina Lisitsa, London Symphony Orchestra & Michael Francis
2024	Ball	Way Down We Go by KALEO
2024	Clubs	Opening / Mysterious Ways by Color Purple New Broadway Cast
2024	Ribbon	La bohème by Charles Aznavour
2023	Hoop	Adiós by Benjamin Clementine
2023	Ball	You Were Mine by Tami Neilson
2023	Clubs	Madcap Masquerade by Caleb Swift & Hypersonic Music
2023	Ribbon	Modigliani Suite by Guy Farley
2022	Hoop	Seven Nation Army by Scott Bradlee's Postmodern Jukebox, feat. Haley Reinhart
2022	Ball	Ceux Qui Revent by Isak Danielson
2022	Clubs	Fate of the Clockmaker by Eternal Eclipse
2022	Ribbon	My Mother Told Me (Extended Mix) by L.B. One, Datamotion & Perly I Lotry

== Competitive history ==
Competitive history of Evita Griskenas at the junior level
Year	Event	Team	AA	HP	BA	CL	RB
2013	U.S. Rhythmic Championships		11	10	15	12	8
2014	Rhythmic Challenge		7	7	7	4	5
2014	National Qualifier		3rd place, bronze medalist(s)	4	3rd place, bronze medalist(s)	2nd place, silver medalist(s)	4
2014	USA Gymnastics Championships		7	6	10	6	5
Year	Event	Team	AA	HP	BA	CL	RP
2015	Moscow Junior International Tournament		3rd place, bronze medalist(s)				
2015	Rhythmic Challenge		1st place, gold medalist(s)	2nd place, silver medalist(s)	1st place, gold medalist(s)	1st place, gold medalist(s)	2nd place, silver medalist(s)
2015	Lisbon International Tournament			3rd place, bronze medalist(s)	4	3rd place, bronze medalist(s)	7
2015	International Rhythmic Gymnastics Tournament		1st place, gold medalist(s)				
2015	National Qualifier		1st place, gold medalist(s)	3rd place, bronze medalist(s)	1st place, gold medalist(s)	1st place, gold medalist(s)	1st place, gold medalist(s)
2015	USA Gymnastics Championships		1st place, gold medalist(s)	1st place, gold medalist(s)	2nd place, silver medalist(s)	2nd place, silver medalist(s)	3rd place, bronze medalist(s)

Competitive history of Evita Griskenas at the senior level
Year	Event	Team	AA	HP	BA	CL	RB
2016	Espoo World Cup		21				
2016	Rhythmic Challenge		2nd place, silver medalist(s)				
2016	Lisbon World Cup		21				
2016	Pesaro World Cup		28				
2016	Brno Grand Prix		12	12	8	12	9
2016	National Qualifier		1st place, gold medalist(s)	1st place, gold medalist(s)	1st place, gold medalist(s)	2nd place, silver medalist(s)	2nd place, silver medalist(s)
2016	USA Gymnastics Championships		4	3rd place, bronze medalist(s)	7	7	2nd place, silver medalist(s)
2017	Rhythmic Challenge		2nd place, silver medalist(s)	1st place, gold medalist(s)	5	1st place, gold medalist(s)	4
2017	Pesaro World Cup		17				
2017	Baku World Cup		6	7			6
2017	Sofia World Cup			8	5		
2017	USA Gymnastics Championships		2nd place, silver medalist(s)	1st place, gold medalist(s)	2nd place, silver medalist(s)	3rd place, bronze medalist(s)	1st place, gold medalist(s)
2017	Kazan World Challenge Cup		15				
2017	World Championships		11	8			7
2017	Pan American Championships		1st place, gold medalist(s)	1st place, gold medalist(s)	1st place, gold medalist(s)	1st place, gold medalist(s)	1st place, gold medalist(s)
2018	Sofia World Cup		9	6	6		
2018	Pesaro World Cup		8	6			7
2018	Guadalajara World Challenge Cup		10	7		8	6
2018	USA Gymnastics Championships		2nd place, silver medalist(s)	2nd place, silver medalist(s)	1st place, gold medalist(s)	6	4
2018	Baku World Challenge Cup		16				
2018	Kazan World Challenge Cup		13				8
2018	World Championships	7	17				
2018	AEON Cup	5	5				
2019	Corbeil International Tournament	3rd place, bronze medalist(s)	3rd place, bronze medalist(s)		1st place, gold medalist(s)	3rd place, bronze medalist(s)	2nd place, silver medalist(s)
2019	MTM Ljubljana International Tournament		2nd place, silver medalist(s)	1st place, gold medalist(s)	2nd place, silver medalist(s)		
2019	Pesaro World Cup		6	8	8		5
2019	Sofia World Cup		6	5		7	6
2019	Rhythmic Elite Qualifier		2nd place, silver medalist(s)	2nd place, silver medalist(s)	1st place, gold medalist(s)	3rd place, bronze medalist(s)	7
2019	Holon Grand Prix		5	7	6		7
2019	USA Gymnastics Championships		2nd place, silver medalist(s)	2nd place, silver medalist(s)	2nd place, silver medalist(s)	4	1st place, gold medalist(s)
2019	Pan American Games		1st place, gold medalist(s)	1st place, gold medalist(s)	1st place, gold medalist(s)	3rd place, bronze medalist(s)	1st place, gold medalist(s)
2019	Kazan World Cup		8				5
2019	World Championships	7	8		8		
2020	Rhythmic Challenge		2nd place, silver medalist(s)	1st place, gold medalist(s)	1st place, gold medalist(s)	4	1st place, gold medalist(s)
2020	Grand Prix Brno		4		3rd place, bronze medalist(s)		
2021	Rhythmic Challenge		1st place, gold medalist(s)	2nd place, silver medalist(s)	1st place, gold medalist(s)	1st place, gold medalist(s)	1st place, gold medalist(s)
2021	Sofia World Cup		27				
2021	Tashkent World Cup		20				
2021	Baku World Cup		23				
2021	Pesaro World Cup		18				
2021	USA Gymnastics Championships		2nd place, silver medalist(s)	8	1st place, gold medalist(s)	2nd place, silver medalist(s)	2nd place, silver medalist(s)
2021	Israel International Tournament		1st place, gold medalist(s)	1st place, gold medalist(s)	1st place, gold medalist(s)	1st place, gold medalist(s)	1st place, gold medalist(s)
2021	Olympic Games		12				
2021	World Championships	9					
2022	Rhythmic Challenge				1st place, gold medalist(s)	2nd place, silver medalist(s)	
2022	Baku World Cup		8		8		8
2022	Portimão World Challenge Cup		4	7	8	6	3rd place, bronze medalist(s)
2022	USA Gymnastics Championships		1st place, gold medalist(s)	1st place, gold medalist(s)	2nd place, silver medalist(s)	1st place, gold medalist(s)	2nd place, silver medalist(s)
2022	Pan American Championships	1st place, gold medalist(s)	1st place, gold medalist(s)				
2022	World Games			7			5
2022	World Championships	5	10	7			
2023	Rhythmic Challenge		1st place, gold medalist(s)	1st place, gold medalist(s)	1st place, gold medalist(s)	2nd place, silver medalist(s)	3rd place, bronze medalist(s)
2023	Aphrodite Cup		2nd place, silver medalist(s)	3rd place, bronze medalist(s)		1st place, gold medalist(s)	1st place, gold medalist(s)
2023	Faliro World Cup		9		3rd place, bronze medalist(s)		6
2023	Portimão World Challenge Cup		2nd place, silver medalist(s)	2nd place, silver medalist(s)	4	2nd place, silver medalist(s)	5
2023	Pan American Championships	2nd place, silver medalist(s)	3rd place, bronze medalist(s)	3rd place, bronze medalist(s)	WD	WD	WD
2023	World Championships	14					
2023	Pan American Games		2nd place, silver medalist(s)	3rd place, bronze medalist(s)	3rd place, bronze medalist(s)	3rd place, bronze medalist(s)	3rd place, bronze medalist(s)
2024	Portimão World Challenge Cup						6
2024	Grand Prix Final		4		5		3rd place, bronze medalist(s)
2024	Olympic Games		18				
