= Ana Luiza Franceschi =

Brazilian rhythmic gymnast (born 2008)

- Full name: Ana Luiza Franceschi De Souza
- Born: 18 February 2008 (age 18) Brazil

Gymnastics career
- Discipline: Rhythmic gymnastics
- Country represented: Brazil (2023-present)
- Club: Associacao de Ginastica Ritmica e Desportiva de Joinville
- Head coach: Camila Ferezin
- Former coach: Juliana Coradine
- Choreographer: Bruna Martins
Medal record
Representing Brazil
Rhythmic Gymnastics
| Event | 1st | 2nd | 3rd |
|---|---|---|---|
| FIG World Cup | 4 | 0 | 1 |
| Total | 4 | 0 | 1 |
Junior Pan American Championships
| Gold medal – first place | 2023 Guadalajara | Group All-Around |
| Gold medal – first place | 2023 Guadalajara | 5 Ropes |
| Gold medal – first place | 2023 Guadalajara | 5 Balls |

Ana Luiza Franceschi De Souza (born 18 February 2008) is a Brazilian rhythmic gymnast. She's a multiple Pan American champion as a member of the national junior group.

== Career ==
In 2023, Ana Luiza was incorporated into the national junior group and competed at the Pan American Championships along Laura Gamboa, Isadora Beduschi, Yumi Rodrigues, Maria Paula Caminha and Lavinia Silvério, winning all three titles. In July she was selected for the Junior World Championships in Cluj-Napoca, finishing 12th in teams, 6th in the All-Around, 6th with 5ropes and 8th with 5 balls.

Franceschi became a senior in 2024. In December she participated in the selection for the new Brazilian senior group. A week later it was revealed she was selected to integrate the group.

In May 2025 she made her debut at the World Cup in Portimão along Nicole Pircio, Bárbara Urquiza, Julia Kurunczi, Maria Eduarda Arakaki, Maria Paula Caminha, Mariana Vitória Gonçalves and Sofia Pereira, winning gold in the All-Around and in the two event finals.
