= Prêmio Brasil Olímpico =

- Description: The highest honor for Brazilian athletes (The "Oscars" of Brazilian Sport)
- Country: Brazil
- Presented by: Comitê Olímpico do Brasil (COB)
- Website: www.cob.org.br

Prêmio Brasil Olímpico (Brazil Olympic Prize) is the name given to the highest recognition that a Brazilian athlete can receive nationally.

== History and configuration ==
The award was created in 1999 by the Brazilian Olympic Committee (BOC), who wanted to have a form of maximum recognition that could be bestowed upon the Brazilian athletes that were considered to have been the best in the country.

The first installment of the award was held in São Paulo, but every other ceremony thereafter has been held in Rio de Janeiro. A strike of the Theatro Municipal employees in 2016 postponed the ceremony until March 29, 2017.

In order to be eligible, an athlete must be affiliated to a sport's Confederation whose sport is part of the Olympic Program. The athlete is then nominated by his or her Confederation for a vote that will determine the best athlete in the country for each sport — some Confederations have nominated only one athlete at times, which results in the need for only one vote in order for the athlete to be chosen as the best in the country.

The winners of each sport's election integrate the longlist for the highest award to be granted: the Athlete of the Year award. From the longlist, three finalists (or nominees) are selected, with the winner announced only at the Award Ceremony, which takes place in the first half of December. It is also possible that an athlete that may not have won in his or her sport (which serves as a longlist for the Athlete of the Year award), still be included in the shortlist, if said athlete is the winner of the previous year award. This was done in 2005, when female gymnast Daiane dos Santos, although not having won in her sport's category, was included in the shortlist for the female award as the winner of the 2004 award — this resulted in the unusual circumstance of having two athletes from the same sport running for the same award, since gymnast Laís Souza was also nominated for the female Athlete of the Year award.

A noteworthy discrepancy is that, in the election for best athlete in each sport, men and women run together (there is only one "best athlete" in each sport, man or woman), but for the nomination for Best Athlete of the Year, there are separate categories for male and female athletes. This has the effect of ensuring a variety of sports amidst the six athletes (between men and women) that run for the two awards, since no sport will have two nominees (one male and one female).

In the election, the candidates are voted on by two separate groups: a selected jury (chosen by the BOC) and the popular vote, both voting online. The results are then combined and the winner, chosen.

In addition, there is another award, which can be granted to both athletes and non-athletes: the Personalidade Olímpica (Olympic Personality) Award. This is granted to any public figure whose efforts were deemed to have helped advance sport in the country.

In 2004, for the first time, awards were given for the Best Paralympic Athlete of the Year (separately for men and women).

== Best athlete of the year ==
=== Men ===
Year	Date	Athlete	Discipline
1999	December 7	Gustavo Kuerten	Tennis
1999	December 7	Claudinei da Silva	Athletics
1999	December 7	Rodrigo Pessoa	Equestrian
2000	December 11	Gustavo Kuerten	Tennis
2000	December 11	Claudinei da Silva	Athletics
2000	December 11	Robert Scheidt	Sailing
2001	December 17	Robert Scheidt	Sailing
2001	December 17	Gustavo Kuerten	Tennis
2001	December 17	Nalbert Bitencourt	Volleyball
2002	December 17	Nalbert Bitencourt	Volleyball
2002	December 17	André Sá	Tennis
2002	December 17	Robert Scheidt	Sailing
2003	December 15	Fernando Meligeni	Tennis
2003	December 15	Giovane Gavio	Volleyball
2003	December 15	Robert Scheidt	Sailing
2004	December 7	Vanderlei de Lima	Athletics
2004	December 7	Robert Scheidt	Sailing
2004	December 7	Torben Grael	Sailing
2005	December 13	João Derly	Judo
2005	December 13	Giba	Volleyball
2005	December 13	Robert Scheidt	Sailing
2006	December 12	Giba	Volleyball
2006	December 12	Diego Hypólito	Artistic gymnastics
2006	December 12	Torben Grael	Sailing
2007	December 17	Thiago Pereira	Swimming
2007	December 17	Diego Hypólito	Artistic gymnastics
2007	December 17	Tiago Camilo	Judo
2008	December 16	César Cielo	Swimming
2008	December 16	Diego Hypólito	Artistic gymnastics
2008	December 16	Robert Scheidt	Sailing
2009	December 21	César Cielo	Swimming
2009	December 21	Diego Hypólito	Artistic gymnastics
2009	December 21	Torben Grael	Sailing
2010	December 20	Murilo Endres	Volleyball
2010	December 20	César Cielo	Swimming
2010	December 20	Leandro Guilheiro	Judo
2011	December 19	César Cielo	Swimming
2011	December 19	Diego Hypólito	Artistic gymnastics
2011	December 19	Emanuel Rego	Beach volleyball
2012	December 18	Arthur Zanetti	Artistic gymnastics
2012	December 18	Esquiva Falcão	Boxing
2012	December 18	Thiago Pereira	Swimming
2013	December 17	Jorge Zarif	Sailing
2013	December 17	Arthur Zanetti	Artistic gymnastics
2013	December 17	César Cielo	Swimming
2014	December 16	Arthur Zanetti	Artistic gymnastics
2014	December 16	Marcus Vinicius D'Almeida	Archery
2014	December 16	Tiago Splitter	Basketball
2015	December 15	Isaquias Queiroz	Canoe sprint
2015	December 15	Alison Cerutti and Bruno Oscar Schmidt	Beach volleyball
2015	December 15	Marcelo Melo	Tennis
2016	March 29, 2017	Isaquias Queiroz	Canoe sprint
2016	March 29, 2017	Sérgio Santos	Volleyball
2016	March 29, 2017	Thiago Braz da Silva	Athletics
2017	March 28, 2018	Marcelo Melo	Tennis
2017	March 28, 2018	Caio Bonfim	Athletics
2017	March 28, 2018	Evandro Oliveira and André Stein	Beach volleyball
2018	December 18	Isaquias Queiroz	Canoe sprint
2018	December 18	Gabriel Medina	Surfing
2018	December 18	Pedro Barros	Skateboarding
2019	December 10	Arthur Mariano	Artistic gymnastics
2019	December 10	Isaquias Queiroz	Canoe sprint
2019	December 10	Gabriel Medina	Surfing
2021	December 7	Isaquias Queiroz	Canoe sprint
2021	December 7	Italo Ferreira	Surfing
2021	December 7	Hebert Conceição	Boxing
2022	February 2, 2023	Alison dos Santos	Athletics
2022	February 2, 2023	Filipe Toledo	Surfing
2022	February 2, 2023	Isaquias Queiroz	Canoe sprint
2023	December 15	Marcus Vinicius D'Almeida	Archery
2023	December 15	Filipe Toledo	Surfing
2023	December 15	Hugo Calderano	Table tennis
2024	December 11	Caio Bonfim	Athletics
2024	December 11	Edival Pontes	Taekwondo
2024	December 11	Isaquias Queiroz	Canoe sprint
2025	December 11	Caio Bonfim	Athletics
2025	December 11	Henrique Marques	Taekwondo
2025	December 11	Hugo Calderano	Table tennis
2025	December 11	Yago Dora	Surfing

=== Women ===
Year	Date	Athlete	Sport
1999	December 7	Maurren Maggi	Athletics
1999	December 7	Daiane dos Santos	Artistic gymnastics
1999	December 7	Shelda Bede	Beach volleyball
2000	December 11	Leila Barros	Volleyball
2000	December 11	Janeth Arcain	Basketball
2000	December 11	Shelda Bede	Beach volleyball
2001	December 17	Daniele Hypólito	Artistic gymnastics
2001	December 17	Janeth Arcain	Basketball
2001	December 17	Maurren Maggi	Athletics
2002	December 17	Daniele Hypólito	Artistic gymnastics
2002	December 17	Adriana Behar	Beach volleyball
2002	December 17	Maurren Maggi	Athletics
2003	December 15	Daiane dos Santos	Artistic gymnastics
2003	December 15	Janeth Arcain	Basketball
2003	December 15	Juliana Veloso	Diving
2004	December 7	Daiane dos Santos	Artistic gymnastics
2004	December 7	Daniele Hypólito	Artistic gymnastics
2004	December 7	Shelda Bede	Beach volleyball
2005	December 13	Natália Falavigna	Taekwondo
2005	December 13	Daiane dos Santos	Artistic gymnastics
2005	December 13	Laís Souza	Artistic gymnastics
2006	December 12	Laís Souza	Artistic gymnastics
2006	December 12	Isabel Clark Ribeiro	Snowboarding
2006	December 12	Larissa França	Beach volleyball
2007	December 17	Jade Barbosa	Artistic gymnastics
2007	December 17	Fabiana Murer	Athletics
2007	December 17	Marta	Football
2008	December 16	Maurren Maggi	Athletics
2008	December 16	Ketleyn Quadros	Judo
2008	December 16	Natália Falavigna	Taekwondo
2009	December 21	Sarah Menezes	Judo
2009	December 21	Natália Falavigna	Taekwondo
2009	December 21	Poliana Okimoto	Open water swimming
2010	December 21	Fabiana Murer	Athletics
2010	December 21	Ana Marcela Cunha	Open water swimming
2010	December 21	Juliana Silva and Larissa França	Beach volleyball
2011	December 19	Fabiana Murer	Athletics
2011	December 19	Fabiana Beltrame	Rowing
2011	December 19	Maurren Maggi	Athletics
2012	December 18	Sheilla Castro	Volleyball
2012	December 18	Sarah Menezes	Judo
2012	December 18	Yane Marques	Modern pentathlon
2013	December 17	Poliana Okimoto	Open water swimming
2013	December 17	Rafaela Silva	Judo
2013	December 17	Yane Marques	Modern pentathlon
2014	December 16	Martine Grael and Kahena Kunze	Sailing
2014	December 16	Ana Marcela Cunha	Open water swimming
2014	December 16	Mayra Aguiar	Judo
2015	December 15	Ana Marcela Cunha	Open water swimming
2015	December 15	Ágatha Bednarczuk and Bárbara Seixas	Beach volleyball
2015	December 15	Fabiana Murer	Athletics
2016	March 29, 2017	Rafaela Silva	Judo
2016	March 29, 2017	Martine Grael and Kahena Kunze	Sailing
2016	March 29, 2017	Poliana Okimoto	Open water swimming
2017	March 28, 2018	Mayra Aguiar	Judo
2017	March 28, 2018	Ana Marcela Cunha	Open water swimming
2017	March 28, 2018	Ana Sátila	Canoe slalom
2018	December 18	Ana Marcela Cunha	Open water swimming
2018	December 18	Ana Sátila	Canoe slalom
2018	December 18	Marta	Football
2019	December 10	Beatriz Ferreira	Boxing
2019	December 10	Nathalie Moellhausen	Fencing
2019	December 10	Ana Marcela Cunha	Open water swimming
2021	December 7	Rebeca Andrade	Artistic gymnastics
2021	December 7	Ana Marcela Cunha	Open water swimming
2021	December 7	Rayssa Leal	Skateboarding
2022	February 2, 2023	Rebeca Andrade	Artistic gymnastics
2022	February 2, 2023	Ana Marcela Cunha	Open water swimming
2022	February 2, 2023	Rayssa Leal	Skateboarding
2023	December 15	Rebeca Andrade	Artistic gymnastics
2023	December 15	Beatriz Haddad Maia	Tennis
2023	December 15	Ana Patrícia Ramos and Duda Lisboa	Beach volleyball
2024	December 11	Rebeca Andrade	Artistic gymnastics
2024	December 11	Ana Sátila	Canoe slalom
2024	December 11	Beatriz Souza	Judo
2025	December 11	Maria Clara Pacheco	Taekwondo
2025	December 11	Gabi Guimarães	Volleyball
2025	December 11	Rayssa Leal	Skateboarding
2025	December 11	Rebeca Lima	Boxing

=== Fan's Choice ===
Year	Date	Athlete	Discipline
2014	December 16	Flávia Saraiva	Artistic gymnastics
2014	December 16	Aline Ferreira	Wrestling
2014	December 16	César Cielo	Swimming
2014	December 16	Diego Hypólito	Artistic gymnastics
2014	December 16	Isaquias Queiroz	Canoe sprint
2014	December 16	Kahena Kunze	Sailing
2014	December 16	Larissa França	Beach volleyball
2014	December 16	Marcus Vinicius D'Almeida	Archery
2014	December 16	Martine Grael	Sailing
2014	December 16	Matheus Santana	Swimming
2014	December 16	Mayra Aguiar	Judo
2014	December 16	Sheilla Castro	Volleyball
2014	December 16	Talita Antunes	Beach volleyball
2014	December 16	Tiago Splitter	Basketball
2015	December 15	Thiago Pereira	Swimming
2015	December 15	Alison Cerutti and Bruno Oscar Schmidt	Beach volleyball
2015	December 15	Ana Marcela Cunha	Open water swimming
2015	December 15	Érika Miranda	Judo
2015	December 15	Fabiana Murer	Athletics
2015	December 15	Isaquias Queiroz	Canoe sprint
2015	December 15	Marcelo Melo	Tennis
2015	December 15	Yane Marques	Modern pentathlon
2016	March 29, 2017	Rafaela Silva	Judo
2016	March 29, 2017	Alison Cerutti and Bruno Oscar Schmidt	Beach volleyball
2016	March 29, 2017	Arthur Mariano	Artistic gymnastics
2016	March 29, 2017	Diego Hypólito	Artistic gymnastics
2016	March 29, 2017	Isaquias Queiroz	Canoe sprint
2016	March 29, 2017	Martine Grael and Kahena Kunze	Sailing
2016	March 29, 2017	Robson Conceição	Boxing
2016	March 29, 2017	Poliana Okimoto	Open water swimming
2016	March 29, 2017	Sérgio Santos	Volleyball
2016	March 29, 2017	Thiago Braz da Silva	Athletics
2017	March 28, 2018	Caio Bonfim	Athletics
2017	March 28, 2018	Ana Marcela Cunha	Open water swimming
2017	March 28, 2018	Ana Sátila	Canoe slalom
2017	March 28, 2018	Bruno Fratus	Swimming
2017	March 28, 2018	Evandro Oliveira and André Stein	Beach volleyball
2017	March 28, 2018	Gabriel Medina	Surfing
2017	March 28, 2018	Letícia Bufoni	Skateboarding
2017	March 28, 2018	Marcelo Melo	Tennis
2017	March 28, 2018	Mayra Aguiar	Judo
2017	March 28, 2018	Rebeca Andrade	Artistic gymnastics
2018	December 18	Henrique Avancini	Mountain biking
2018	December 18	Ágatha Bednarczuk and Duda Lisboa	Beach volleyball
2018	December 18	Arthur Zanetti	Artistic gymnastics
2018	December 18	Bruno Fratus	Swimming
2018	December 18	Bruno Rezende	Volleyball
2018	December 18	Eduarda Amorim	Handball
2018	December 18	Érika Miranda	Judo
2018	December 18	Gabriel Medina	Surfing
2018	December 18	Letícia Bufoni	Skateboarding
2018	December 18	Marta	Football
2019	December 10	Hugo Calderano	Table tennis
2019	December 10	Flávia Saraiva	Artistic gymnastics
2019	December 10	Italo Ferreira	Surfing
2019	December 10	Nathalie Moellhausen	Fencing
2019	December 10	Ana Marcela Cunha	Open water swimming
2019	December 10	Bruno Rezende	Volleyball
2019	December 10	Mayra Aguiar	Judo
2019	December 10	Paulo André de Oliveira	Athletics
2019	December 10	Pedro Barros	Skateboarding
2019	December 10	Ana Sátila	Canoe slalom
2021	December 7	Fernanda Garay	Volleyball
2021	December 7	Alison dos Santos	Athletics
2021	December 7	Ana Marcela Cunha	Open water swimming
2021	December 7	Beatriz Ferreira	Boxing
2021	December 7	Bruno Fratus	Swimming
2021	December 7	Darlan Romani	Athletics
2021	December 7	Douglas Souza	Volleyball
2021	December 7	Gabriel Medina	Surfing
2021	December 7	Hebert Conceição	Boxing
2021	December 7	Isaquias Queiroz	Canoeing
2021	December 7	Italo Ferreira	Surfing
2021	December 7	Kahena Kunze	Sailing
2021	December 7	Martine Grael	Sailing
2021	December 7	Mayra Aguiar	Judo
2021	December 7	Pedro Barros	Skateboarding
2021	December 7	Rayssa Leal	Skateboarding
2021	December 7	Rebeca Andrade	Artistic gymnastics
2021	December 7	Robert Scheidt	Sailing
2021	December 7	Rosamaria Montibeller	Volleyball
2022	February 2, 2023	Hugo Calderano	Table tennis
2022	February 2, 2023	Alison dos Santos	Athletics
2022	February 2, 2023	Ana Marcela Cunha	Open water swimming
2022	February 2, 2023	Arthur Mariano	Artistic gymnastics
2022	February 2, 2023	Marcus Vinicius D'Almeida	Archery
2022	February 2, 2023	Rafaela Silva	Judo
2022	February 2, 2023	Rayssa Leal	Skateboarding
2022	February 2, 2023	Rebeca Andrade	Artistic gymnastics
2023	December 15	Flávia Saraiva	Artistic gymnastics
2023	December 15	Augusto Akio	Skateboarding
2023	December 15	Bárbara Domingos	Rhythmic gymnastics
2023	December 15	Beatriz Ferreira	Boxing
2023	December 15	Darlan Souza	Volleyball
2023	December 15	Guilherme Costa	Swimming
2024	December 11	Caio Bonfim	Athletics
2024	December 11	Alison dos Santos	Athletics
2024	December 11	Ana Sátila	Canoe slalom
2024	December 11	Beatriz Souza	Judo
2024	December 11	Darlan Souza	Volleyball
2024	December 11	Tatiana Weston-Webb	Surfing
2025	December 11	Men's category	
2025	December 11	João Fonseca	Tennis
2025	December 11	Alison dos Santos	Athletics
2025	December 11	Hugo Calderano	Table tennis
2025	December 11	Women's category	
2025	December 11	Gabi Guimarães	Volleyball
2025	December 11	Flávia Saraiva	Artistic gymnastics
2025	December 11	Duda Arakaki, Maria Paula Caminha, Mariana Gonçalves, Sofia Pereira and Nicole Pircio	Rhythmic gymnastics

=== Breakthrough Athlete ===
Year	Date	Athlete	Discipline
2023	December 15	Maria Eduarda Alexandre	Rhythmic gymnastics
2023	December 15	Miguel Hidalgo	Triathlon
2023	December 15	Renan Gallina	Athletics
2024	December 11	Gustavo Oliveira	Cycling BMX
2024	December 11	Maria Fernanda Costa	Swimming
2024	December 11	Raicca Ventura	Skateboarding
2025	December 11	Rebeca Lima	Boxing
