= Gabriella Coradine =

Brazilian rhythmic gymnast (born 2005)

- Full name: Gabriella Coradine Castilho
- Born: January 7, 2005 (age 21) Vila Velha, Brazil

Gymnastics career
- Discipline: Rhythmic gymnastics
- Country represented: Brazil (2019-2024)
- Club: UNOPAR
- Head coach: Camila Ferezin
- Former coach: Juliana Coradine
- Choreographer: Bruna Martins
- Retired: Yes
Medal record
Rhythmic gymnastics
Representing Brazil
Pan American Games
| Gold medal – first place | 2023 Santiago | Group all-around |
| Gold medal – first place | 2023 Santiago | 5 hoops |
| Gold medal – first place | 2023 Santiago | 3 ribbons + 2 balls |
South American Championships
| Gold medal – first place | 2023 Barranquilla | All-around team |
| Gold medal – first place | 2023 Barranquilla | Group all-around |
| Gold medal – first place | 2023 Barranquilla | 5 hoops |
| Gold medal – first place | 2023 Barranquilla | 3 ribbons + 2 balls |

Gabriella Coradine (born 7 January 2005) is a retired Brazilian rhythmic gymnast. She's a multiple Pan American and South American medalist.

== Personal life ==
She took up the sport at age six, as she went to the gym with her mother Juliana Coradine who worked as a coach, now she trains the national junior group, and was also a member of the group that won gold at the 1999 Pan American Games. Her idols are Bárbara Domingos, Linoy Ashram, Sofia Raffaeli, her dream is to compete at the 2024 Olympic Games.

== Career ==
In 2019 Gabriella competed at the junior Pan American Championships in the group category along Flavia Izidoro, Mel Gomes, Emily Almeida, Julia Kurunczi and Rafaela Elias, winning gold with 5 ribbons and silver in the All-Around and with 5 hoops. In July she took part in the 1st Junior World Championships in Moscow, ending 26th in teams, 28th in the All-Around, 27th with 5 hoops and 26th with 5 ribbons.

As a senior in 2023 she participated in the South American Championships where she won gold in the All-Around, with 5 hoops, with 3 ribbons and 2 balls and in teams along Victória Borges, Julia Kurunczi, Mariana Vitória Gonçalves, Maria Flávia Britto, Maria Fernanda Moraes and individuals Maria Eduarda Alexandre, Ana Luísa Neiva, Thainá Ramos. She was then selected for the Pan American Games in Santiago becoming the All-Around champion with Bárbara Galvão, Victória Borges, Giovanna Oliveira, Nicole Pircio.
