= Maria Paula Caminha =

Brazilian rhythmic gymnast

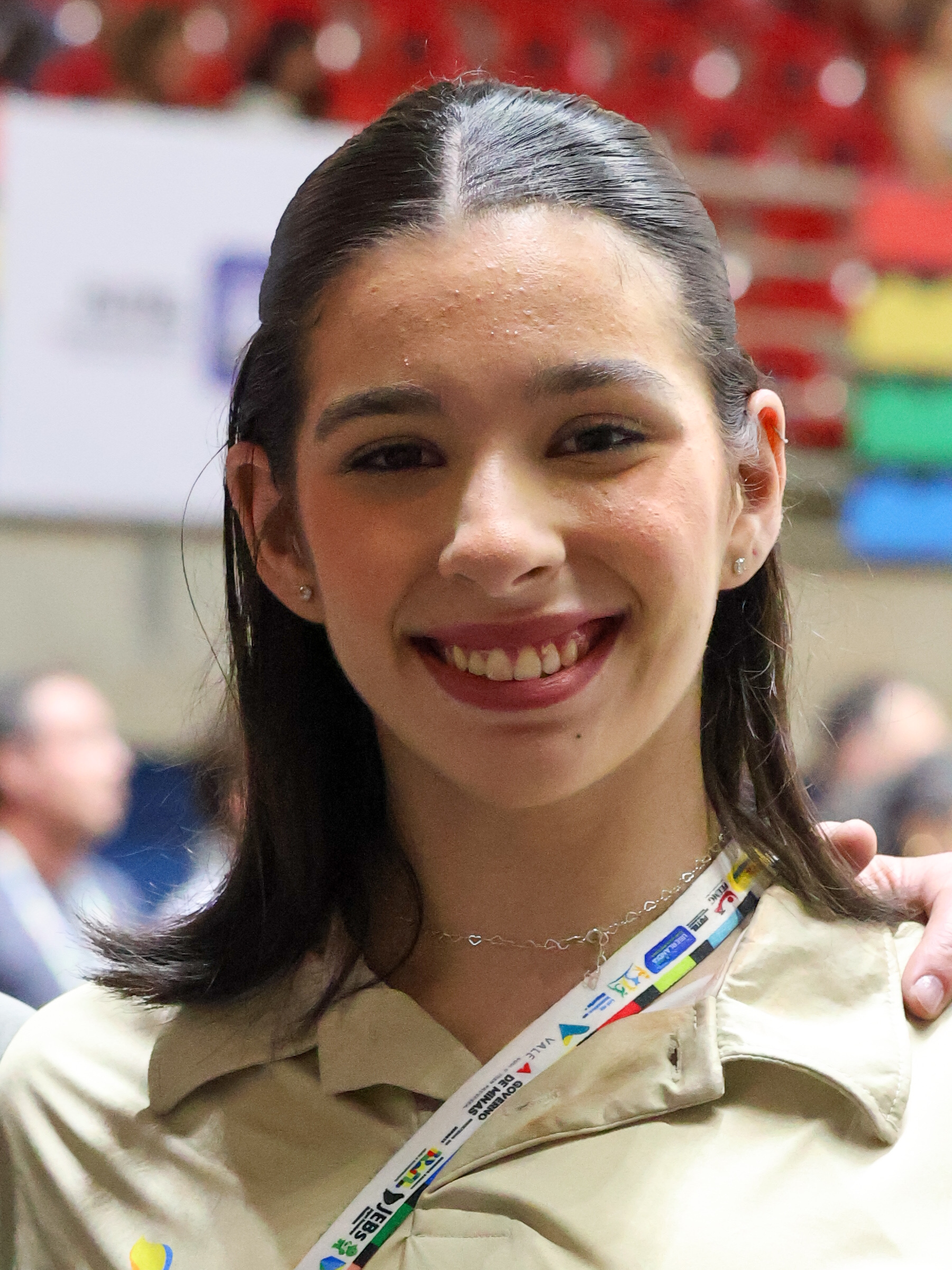
- Full name: Maria Paula Pereira Caminha
- Born: 30 September 2008 (age 18) Brazil

Gymnastics career
- Discipline: Rhythmic gymnastics
- Country represented: Brazil; (2023–present)
- Club: GORBA
- Head coach: Camila Ferezin
- Former coach: Juliana Coradine
- Choreographer: Bruna Martins
Medal record
Representing Brazil
Rhythmic Gymnastics
Event	1st	2nd	3rd
FIG World Cup	5	2	1
Total	5	2	1
World Championships
Gold medal – first place	2026 Frankfurt	5 Balls
Gold medal – first place	2026 Frankfurt	3 Hoops + 4 Clubs
Silver medal – second place	2025 Rio de Janeiro	Group All-Around
Silver medal – second place	2025 Rio de Janeiro	3 balls + 2 hoops
Bronze medal – third place	2026 Frankfurt	Group All Around
Pan American Championships
Gold medal – first place	2026 Rio de Janeiro	Group All-Around
Gold medal – first place	2026 Rio de Janeiro	5 Balls
Gold medal – first place	2026 Rio de Janeiro	3 Hoops + 4 Clubs
Junior Pan American Championships
Gold medal – first place	2023 Guadalajara	Group All-Around
Gold medal – first place	2023 Guadalajara	5 Ropes
Gold medal – first place	2023 Guadalajara	5 Balls

Maria Paula Pereira Caminha (born 30 September 2008) is a Brazilian rhythmic gymnast. She is the 2025 World group all-around silver medalist.

== Career ==
=== Junior ===
In 2023, Maria Paula was incorporated into the national junior group and competed at the Pan American Championships in Guadalajara, alongside Laura Gamboa, Isadora Beduschi, Yumi Rodrigues, Ana Luiza Franceschi and Lavinia Silvério, winning all three titles. In July, she was selected to compete at the Junior World Championships in Cluj-Napoca, finishing 12th in team competition, 6th in the All-Around, 6th with 5 ropes and 8th with 5 balls.

=== Senior ===
In December 2024 she participated in the selection for the new Brazilian senior group. A week later it was revealed she was selected to integrate the group.

In May 2025 she made her debut at the World Cup in Portimão together with Nicole Pircio, Bárbara Urquiza, Julia Kurunczi, Maria Eduarda Arakaki, Ana Luiza Franceschi, Mariana Vitória Gonçalves and Sofia Pereira, winning gold in the All-Around and in the two event finals. On July 18-20, the group won gold medal in all-around at Milan World Cup. They also won gold medal in 5 Ribbons final and bronze in 3 Balls and 2 Hoops.

In late August, she was selected to represent Brazil alongside Maria Eduarda Arakaki, Mariana Vitória Gonçalves, Sofia Pereira and Nicole Pircio at the 2025 World Championships in her hometown, Rio de Janeiro. They won silver medal in group all-around, 0.3 point behind Japan, being the first Pan-American medal winners of the World Championships. They won another silver medal in 3 balls + 2 hoops and took 6th place in 5 ribbons final.

In 2026, she and her group competed at Baku World Cup, taking 5th place in all-around. They won silver medal in 5 Balls final. Then they competed at Tashkent World Cup, and ended on 7th place in all-around. They won silver medal in 3 Hoops + 4 Clubs final. On June 5-7, Caminha and her teammates (Maria Eduarda Arakaki, Mariana Vitória Gonçalves, Julia Kurunczi, Sofia Pereira, Nicole Pircio) represented Brazil at the 2026 Pan American Championships in Rio de Janeiro, and won three gold medals (Group all-around, 5 Balls, 3 Hoops + 4 Clubs). In July, they competed at Milan World Cup and took gold medal in all-around in front of China and Spain. They also won silver medal in 5 Balls final.
