= Mariana Vitória Gonçalves =

Brazilian rhythmic gymnast (born 2005)

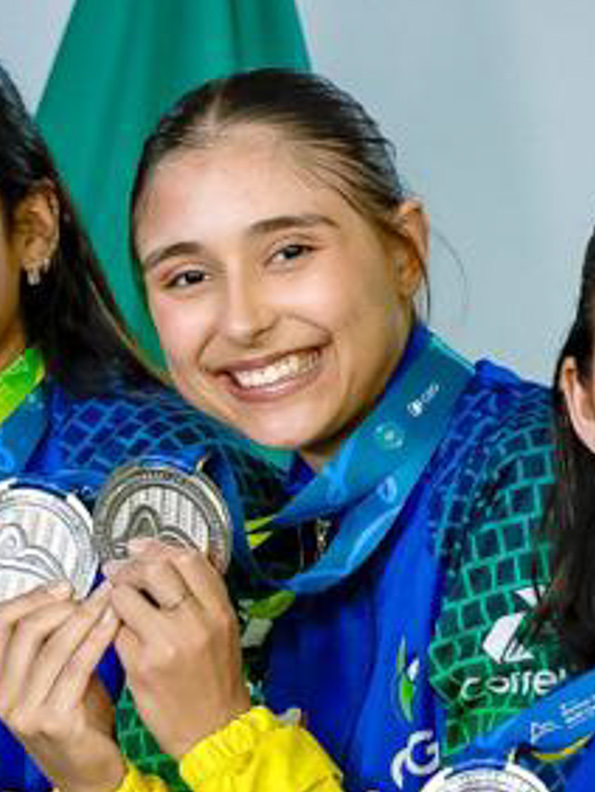
- Full name: Mariana Vitória Gonçalves Pinto
- Born: June 2, 2005 (age 21) Curitiba, Brazil

Gymnastics career
- Discipline: Rhythmic gymnastics
- Country represented: Brazil; (2019–present)
- Club: Associacao de Ginastica Ritmica
- Head coach: Camila Ferezin
- Former coach: Kareen Priscilla Cunha
- Choreographer: Bruna Martins
Medal record
Rhythmic gymnastics
Representing Brazil
Event	1st	2nd	3rd
FIG World Cup	6	6	1
Total	6	6	1
World Championships
Gold medal – first place	2026 Frankfurt	5 Balls
Gold medal – first place	2026 Frankfurt	3 Hoops + 4 Clubs
Silver medal – second place	2025 Rio de Janeiro	Group All-Around
Silver medal – second place	2025 Rio de Janeiro	3 Balls + 2 Hoops
Bronze medal – third place	2026 Frankfurt	Group All Around
Pan American Championships
Gold medal – first place	2026 Rio de Janeiro	Group all-around
Gold medal – first place	2026 Rio de Janeiro	5 balls
Gold medal – first place	2026 Rio de Janeiro	3 hoops + 4 clubs
Silver medal – second place	2022 Rio de Janeiro	Team
South American Games
Gold medal – first place	2026 Santa Fe	Group all-around
Gold medal – first place	2026 Santa Fe	5 balls
Gold medal – first place	2026 Santa Fe	3 hoops + 4 clubs
South American Championships
Gold medal – first place	2023 Barranquilla	All-around team
Gold medal – first place	2023 Barranquilla	Group all-around
Gold medal – first place	2023 Barranquilla	5 hoops
Gold medal – first place	2023 Barranquilla	3 ribbons + 2 balls

Mariana Vitória Gonçalves Pinto (born 2 June 2005) is a Brazilian rhythmic gymnast. She is the 2025 World group all-around silver medalist.

== Career ==
=== Junior ===
In 2017 Gonçalves read the athlete's oath at the opening ceremony of the Brazilian Youth Scholar Games in Curitiba. In July 2019 she was selected for the Junior World Championships in Moscow along with Maria Moraes, Viviane Oda, Ana Luísa Neiva and the national junior group. There she took 36th place with rope, the only event she competed in, and 26th in the team category.

=== Senior ===
She turned senior in 2021. At the 2021 Brazilian Championships she won gold medal in team competition along with Bárbara Domingos and Nicole Herkenkoff. The following year she took 6th place in all-around in the same competition.

In May 2023, Gonçalves was incorporated into the national senior group. In October she was selected for the South American Championships where she won gold in the All-Around, with 5 hoops, with 3 ribbons and 2 balls and in teams along with Victória Borges, Julia Kurunczi, Gabriella Coradine, Maria Flávia Britto, Maria Fernanda Moraes and individuals Maria Eduarda Alexandre, Ana Luísa Neiva, Thainá Ramos.

In 2024 she made her World Cup debut in Portimão, winning two silver medals in the All-Around and with 5 hoops as well as gold in the mixed event. A month later she won silver overall and with 5 hoops in the stage in Milan. On 6 July, at the selection of the group composition for the Olympic Games, Gonçalves was selected to be a reserve to Maria Eduarda Arakaki, Victória Borges, Déborah Medrado, Sofia Pereira and Nicole Pircio, along with Giovanna Oliveira, Gabriella Coradine and Bárbara Urquiza.

In May 2025 she made her debut at the World Cup in Portimão Nicole Pircio, Bárbara Urquiza, Maria Paula Caminha, Maria Eduarda Arakaki, Ana Luiza Franceschi, Julia Kurunczi and Sofia Pereira, winning gold in the All-Around and in the two event finals. On July 18-20, the group won gold medal in all-around at Milan World Cup. They also won gold medal in 5 Ribbons final and bronze in 3 Balls and 2 Hoops.

In late August, she was selected to represent Brazil alongside Maria Paula Caminha, Maria Eduarda Arakaki, Sofia Pereira and Nicole Pircio at the 2025 World Championships in Rio de Janeiro. They won silver medal in group all-around, 0.3 point behind Japan, being the first Pan-American medal winners of the World Championships. They won another silver medal in 3 balls + 2 hoops and took 6th place in 5 ribbons final.

In 2026, she and her group competed at Baku World Cup, taking 5th place in all-around. They won silver medal in 5 Balls final. Then they competed at Tashkent World Cup, and ended on 7th place in all-around. They won silver medal in 3 Hoops + 4 Clubs final. On June 5-7, Mariana and her teammates (Maria Paula Caminha, Maria Eduarda Arakaki, Julia Kurunczi, Sofia Pereira, Nicole Pircio) represented Brazil at the 2026 Pan American Championships in Rio de Janeiro, and won three gold medals (Group all-around, 5 Balls, 3 Hoops + 4 Clubs). In July, they competed at Milan World Cup and took gold medal in all-around in front of China and Spain. They also won silver medal in 5 Balls final.
