= Julia Kurunczi =

Brazilian rhythmic gymnast (born 2006)

- Born: May 10, 2006 (age 20) Londrina, Brazil

Gymnastics career
- Discipline: Rhythmic gymnastics
- Country represented: Brazil; (2019–present)
- Club: UNOPAR
- Head coach: Camila Ferezin
- Former coach: Juliana Coradine
- Choreographer: Bruna Martins
Medal record
Rhythmic gymnastics
Representing Brazil
Event	1st	2nd	3rd
FIG World Cup	1	3	0
Total	1	3	0
World Championships
Gold medal – first place	2026 Frankfurt	5 Balls
Gold medal – first place	2026 Frankfurt	3 Hoops + 4 Clubs
Bronze medal – third place	2026 Frankfurt	Group All-Around
Pan American Championships
Gold medal – first place	2025 Asunción	Group All-Around
Gold medal – first place	2025 Asunción	5 Ribbons
Gold medal – first place	2025 Asunción	3 Balls + 2 Hoops
Gold medal – first place	2026 Rio de Janeiro	Group All-Around
Gold medal – first place	2026 Rio de Janeiro	5 Balls
Gold medal – first place	2026 Rio de Janeiro	3 Hoops + 4 Clubs
Junior Pan American Championships
Gold medal – first place	2019 Monterrey	5 Ribbons
Silver medal – second place	2019 Monterrey	All-Around
Silver medal – second place	2019 Monterrey	5 Hoops
Junior Pan American Games
Gold medal – first place	2021 Cali	5 Ribbons
Silver medal – second place	2021 Cali]	Group All-around
Silver medal – second place	2021 Cali	5 Balls
South American Games
Gold medal – first place	2022 Asunción	Group all-around
Gold medal – first place	2022 Asunción	5 hoops
Gold medal – first place	2022 Asunción	3 ribbons + 2 balls
Gold medal – first place	2026 Santa Fe	Group All-Around
Gold medal – first place	2026 Santa Fe	5 Balls
Gold medal – first place	2026 Santa Fe	3 Hoops + 4 Clubs
South American Championships
Gold medal – first place	2023 Barranquilla	All-around team
Gold medal – first place	2023 Barranquilla	Group all-around
Gold medal – first place	2023 Barranquilla	5 hoops
Gold medal – first place	2023 Barranquilla	3 ribbons + 2 balls

Julia Kurunczi (born 10 May 2006) is a Brazilian rhythmic gymnast. She is the 2025 World group all-around silver medalist, and a multiple Pan American and South American medalist.

== Career ==
=== Junior ===
In 2019 Julia competed at the junior Pan American Championships in the group category along Flavia Izidoro, Mel Gomes, Emily Almeida, Gabriella Coradine and Rafaela Elias, winning gold with 5 ribbons and silver in the All-Around and with 5 hoops. In July she took part in the 1st Junior World Championships in Moscow, ending 26th in teams, 28th in the All-Around, 27th with 5 hoops and 26th with 5 ribbons.

In 2021 she was again part of the junior group along Fernanda Heinemann, Luiza Pugliese, Bianca Reis and Gabryela da Rocha. At the Pan American Games in Cali they won silver in the All-Around and with 5 balls as well as gold with 5 ribbons. In November they won gold in the All-Around, the two apparatus finals and in teams at the South American Championships.

=== Senior ===
In late 2022, she moved into the senior group and competed at the South American Games alongside Victória Borges, Gabriella Castilho, Bárbara Galvão, Sofia Pereira and Beatriz da Silva. At the competition, Brazil secured gold medals in all events.

In 2023, she took part in the South American Championships, where she obtained gold medals in the all-around, 5 hoops, 3 ribbons and 2 balls, as well as in the team event. The team included Victória Borges, Gabriella Coradine, Mariana Vitória Gonçalves, Maria Flávia Britto and Maria Fernanda Moraes, while the individual delegation featured Maria Eduarda Alexandre, Ana Luísa Neiva and Thainá Ramos.

In May 2025, she made her debut at the World Challenge Cup in Portimão, competing with Nicole Pircio, Bárbara Urquiza, Maria Paula Caminha, Maria Eduarda Arakaki, Ana Luiza Franceschi, Mariana Vitória Gonçalves and Sofia Pereira. The group won gold in the all-around and in both apparatus finals. Later that year, she was selected for the Pan American Championships in Asunción, together with Keila Santos, Lavinia Silvério, Maria Fernanda Moraes, Marianne Giovacchini and Rhayane Vitoria Ferreira Brum. The team won gold medals in the group all-around and in both apparatus finals.

In 2026, she and her group competed at Baku World Cup, taking 5th place in all-around. They won silver medal in 5 Balls final. Then they competed at Tashkent World Cup, and ended on 7th place in all-around. They won silver medal in 3 Hoops + 4 Clubs final. On June 5-7, Kurunczi and her teammates (Maria Paula Caminha, Maria Eduarda Arakaki, Mariana Vitória Gonçalves, Sofia Pereira, Nicole Pircio) represented Brazil at the 2026 Pan American Championships in Rio de Janeiro, and won three gold medals (Group all-around, 5 Balls, 3 Hoops + 4 Clubs). In July, they competed at Milan World Cup and took gold medal in all-around in front of China and Spain. They also won silver medal in 5 Balls final.
