= Barbara Urquiza =

Brazilian rhythmic gymnast (born 2003)

- Full name: Barbara Urquiza Galvão
- Born: January 24, 2003 (age 23) Brazil

Gymnastics career
- Discipline: Rhythmic gymnastics
- Country represented: Brazil (2021–)
- Head coach: Camila Ferezin
- Choreographer: Bruna Martins
Medal record
Rhythmic gymnastics
Representing Brazil
Event	1st	2nd	3rd
FIG World Cup	0	0	1
FIG World Challenge Cup	0	0	1
Total	0	0	2
Pan American Games
Gold medal – first place	2023 Santiago	Group all-Around
Gold medal – first place	2023 Santiago	5 Hoops
Gold medal – first place	2023 Santiago	3 Ribbons + 2 Balls
Pan American Championships
Gold medal – first place	2022 Rio de Janeiro	Group All-around
Gold medal – first place	2022 Rio de Janeiro	5 hoops
Gold medal – first place	2023 Guadalajara	Group All-around
Gold medal – first place	2023 Guadalajara	5 hoops
Gold medal – first place	2023 Guadalajara	3 ribbons + 2 balls
Silver medal – second place	2022 Rio de Janeiro	3 ribbons + 2 balls
South American Games
Gold medal – first place	2022 Asunción	Group all-around
Gold medal – first place	2022 Asunción	5 hoops
Gold medal – first place	2022 Asunción	3 ribbons + 2 balls
South American Championships
Gold medal – first place	2022 Paipa	All-around team
Gold medal – first place	2022 Paipa	Group all-around
Gold medal – first place	2022 Paipa	5 hoops
Gold medal – first place	2022 Paipa	3 ribbons + 2 balls
Gold medal – first place	2026 Asunción	Group All-Around
Gold medal – first place	2026 Asunción	5 Balls
Gold medal – first place	2026 Asunción	3 Hoops + 4 Clubs
Gold medal – first place	2026 Asunción	All-Around Team

Barbara Urquiza (born 24 January 2003) is a Brazilian rhythmic gymnastics, member of the national group.

== Personal life ==
Urquiza took up the sport at age 12, she first tried artistic gymnastics before being convinced to try rhythmic gymnastics. She now trains at the National Rhythmic Gymnastics Training Centre in Aracaju.

== Career ==
=== 2021 ===
In 2021 she entered the senior national group rooster getting to compete at the 2021 World Championships in Kitakyushu along Maria Arakaki, Vitoria Guerra, Deborah Medrado, Nicole Pircio and Beatriz Silva, the group was 9th in the All-Around, 7th with 5 balls and 11th with 3 hoops and 4 clubs.

=== 2022 ===
In 2022 she competed at two World Cups, Portimão where the group was 5th in the All-Around and with 5 hoops and 4th with 3 ribbons and 2 balls, and Pesaro where they finished 4th in the All-Around, 8th with 5 hoops and won bronze with 3 ribbons and 2 balls, the first World Cup medal since 2013 and only the second ever for Brazil. In July she won gold in the All-Around and 5 hoops as well as silver with 3 ribbons and 2 balls at the 2022 Pan American Gymnastics Championships in Rio de Janeiro along Maria Eduarda Arakaki, Déborah Medrado, Nicole Pircio, Gabrielle da Silva and Giovanna Oliveira.

In September 2022 she was selected for the World Championships in Sofia along Maria Arakaki, Deborah Medrado, Gabrielle Moraes, Nicole Pircio, Giovanna Oliveira and the two individuals Geovanna Santos and Barbara Domingos, finishing 10th in teams, 5th in the All-Around, 4th with 5 hoops and 10th with 3 ribbons and 2 balls.

=== 2023 ===
Next year, she represented Brazil at the 2023 World Championships in Valencia, Spain, where she and her teammates finished on 6th place in Group All-around and secured a quota place for the 2024 Olympic Games. They took 4th place in 5 Hoops final and 8th place in team competition.

=== 2024 ===
On 6 July, at the selection of the group composition for the Olympic Games, Gonçalves was selected to be a reserve to Maria Eduarda Arakaki, Victória Borges, Déborah Medrado, Sofia Pereira and Nicole Pircio, along with Giovanna Oliveira, Gabriella Coradine and Mariana Vitória Gonçalves.

=== 2025 ===
Together with Nicole Pircio, Maria Paula Caminha, Mariana Gonçalves, Ana Luiza Franceschi and Maria Eduarda Arakaki they presented new routines at Portimão World Challenge Cup and won gold medals in group all-around, 5 ribbons and 3 balls + 2 hoops.
