= Juliana Coradine =

Brazilian rhythmic gymnast

- Relatives: Gabriella Coradine (daughter)

Gymnastics career
- Discipline: Rhythmic gymnastics
- Country represented: Brazil; (1999-?)
- Retired: yes
Medal record
Rhythmic gymnastics
Representing Brazil
Pan American Games
Gold medal – first place	1999 Winnipeg	Group all-Around

Juliana Coradine is a retired Brazilian rhythmic gymnast and coach who represented Brazil in international competitions.

== Career ==
As a member of the national group Coradine won an historical gold medal at the 1999 Pan American Games in Winnipeg, the first ever in that competition for Brazil, along Camila Ferezin, Dayane Camilo, Flávia Faria, Michelle Salzano and Alessandra Ferezin. This result assured them a spot at the following year Olympics.

After her retirement she started to work as a coach. In late 2000s she trained girls for Fenice Spoleto in Italy. She then was hired at UNOPAR and, in 2017, travelled to the South American Championships in Guayaquil as her daughter's coach. At the 2018 South American Championships she was the trainer of the 13–14 years old group. In 2020 she participated in a national training camp for young gymnasts. The following year she was part of the judges that worked on a seminary for the national team.

In 2021 Juliana was appointed as the head coach of the national junior group. At the South American Championships in Cali, Bianca Reis, Fernanda Heinemann, Gabryela da Rocha, Julia Kurunczi and Luiza Pugliese won gold in the All-Around, in teams and in both finals. In December she guided the group to win gold with 5 ribbons as well as silver in the All-Around and with 5 balls at the Junior Pan American Games.

In October 2022 she travelled to Asunción for the South American Games to be the vice trainer of the senior group under her ex-teammate Camila Ferezin, Brazil won all three golds.

At the start of the 2023 season Coradine asked the world silver winning duo in aerobic gymnastics to teach her pupils some aerobic elements to include in their routines. In June Laura Gamboa, Isadora Beduschi, Yumi Rodrigues, Ana Luiza Franceschi, Maria Paula Caminha and Lavinia Silvério, won three gold medals in the All-Around and in the event finals at the Pan American Championships. A month later the group competed in the Junior World Championships in Cluj-Napoca, finishing 12th in teams, 6th in the All-Around, 6th with 5 ropes and 8th with 5 balls.

In June 2024 she travelled with the group to Guatemala City for the Pan American Championships. There Andriely Cichovicz, Júlia Colere, Luiza Miranda, Alice Neves, Giovana Parra and Clara Pereira won gold in the All-Around, with 5 hoops and with 5 pairs of clubs. In October she organised a training stage with renowned trainer, and Olympic medalist, Yulia Raskina in preparation for the Gymnasiade and the South American Championships.

== Personal life ==
Her eldest daughter Gabriella Coradine was a member of the Brazilian group and won medals internationally as both a junior and a senior.
