= Rusak =

Rusak is a surname. Notable people with the surname include:

- Edvárd Rusák
- Erika Rusak
- Petro Rusak
- Sergey Rusak

== See also ==
- Russak
- Rusack
