= Fernanda Heinemann =

Brazilian rhythmic gymnast

- Full name: Fernanda Francieli Lenz Heinemann
- Born: 8 April 2007 (age 19) Santa Rita, Paraguay

Gymnastics career
- Discipline: Rhythmic gymnastics
- Country represented: Paraguay; (2021-present)
- Former countries represented: Brazil
- Former coach: Juliana Coradine
Medal record
Rhythmic Gymnastics
Representing Brazil
Junior Pan American Games
Gold medal – first place	2021 Cali	5 Ribbons
Silver medal – second place	2021 Cali	Group All-around
Silver medal – second place	2021 Cali	5 Balls
Junior Pan American Championships
Gold medal – first place	2022 Rio de Janeiro	Group All-Around
Gold medal – first place	2022 Rio de Janeiro	5 Ropes
Gold medal – first place	2022 Rio de Janeiro	5 Balls
Representing Paraguay
South American Cup
Bronze medal – third place	2024 Santiago	Hoop
Bronze medal – third place	2024 Santiago	Ball

Fernanda Francieli Lenz Heinemann (born 8 April 2007) is a Paraguayan rhythmic gymnast who formerly represented Brazil. She is a multiple Pan American champion as a member of the junior Brazilian group.

== Career ==
Heinemann went into rhythmic gymnastics through taking circus classes as a child.

In 2021 she was selected for the Brazilian junior group along with Julia Kurunczi, Luiza Pugliese, Bianca Reis and Gabryela da Rocha. At the Pan American Games in Cali, they won silver in the all-around and with 5 balls as well as gold with 5 ribbons.

In March 2022, she was again selected for junior group along with Eloah de Oliveira, Laura Gamboa, Isadora Beduschi, Yumi Rodrigues, Lavinia Silvério and Nicole Vasques. In July they won gold in the all-around, with 5 ropes and with 5 balls at the Pan American Championships.

In 2024, she changed her nationality to represent Paraguay.

== Achievements ==
- First Paraguayan rhythmic gymnast to win a medal in an individual apparatus final at the South American Gymnastics Championships
