= Amanda Bosch =

Mexican rhythmic gymnast (born 2008)

- Full name: Amanda Mariona Bosch Rodarte
- Born: 12 July 2008 (age 18) Guadalajara, Mexico

Gymnastics career
- Discipline: Rhythmic gymnastics
- Country represented: Mexico (2023–present)
- Club: Mabel
- Head coach: Blanca Lopez Belda
Medal record
Representing Mexico
Rhythmic gymnastics
Junior Pan American Championships
Gold medal – first place	2023 Guadalajara	Clubs
Silver medal – second place	2023 Guadalajara	Team
Silver medal – second place	2023 Guadalajara	Ribbon
Bronze medal – third place	2023 Guadalajara	All-Around

Amanda Mariona Bosch Rodarte (born 12 July 2008) is a Mexican rhythmic gymnast. She's the 2023 junior Pan American champion with clubs.

== Career ==
=== Junior ===
In 2021, Bosch was fifth with rope and second in the regional ranking with the Valencian community thanks to her double citizenship.

The following year, she won silver with rope in the first stage of the Liga Iberdrola as part of Club Mabel. In May of that year, she was sixth with ball and 16th with rope at the Youth Championships, where she was first in the regional ranking. In November, she won bronze in the final of the Liga Iberdola.

In 2023, she was selected for the Pan American Championships in her native Guadalajara, where she won bronze in the All-Around, silver in teams and with ribbon, and gold with clubs. In July, she was selected for the Junior World Championships in Cluj-Napoca. In November, she won bronze with rope and gold in teams in the final of Liga Iberdrola.

=== Senior ===
In late 2025, she joins the Mexican senior group after Sofia Flores’ retirement.
