= Giovanna Oliveira (gymnast) =

Brazilian rhythmic gymnast

- Full name: Giovanna Oliveira Silva
- Born: 30 September 1998 (age 27) São Bernardo do Campo, Brazil

Gymnastics career
- Discipline: Rhythmic gymnastics
- Country represented: Brazil (2022-2024)
- Head coach: Camila Ferezin
- Choreographer: Bruna Martins
- Retired: Yes
Medal record
Rhythmic gymnastics
Representing Brazil
Event	1st	2nd	3rd
FIG World Cup	0	0	2
FIG World Challenge Cup	1	0	1
Total	1	0	3
Pan American Games
Gold medal – first place	2023 Santiago	Group all-around
Gold medal – first place	2023 Santiago	5 hoops
Gold medal – first place	2023 Santiago	3 ribbons + 2 balls
Pan American Championships
Gold medal – first place	2022 Rio de Janeiro	Group All-around
Gold medal – first place	2022 Rio de Janeiro	5 hoops
Gold medal – first place	2023 Guadalajara	Group all-around
Gold medal – first place	2023 Guadalajara	5 hoops
Gold medal – first place	2023 Guadalajara	3 ribbons + 2 balls
Silver medal – second place	2022 Rio de Janeiro	3 ribbons + 2 balls
South American Championships
Gold medal – first place	2022 Paipa	All-around team
Gold medal – first place	2022 Paipa	Group all-around
Gold medal – first place	2022 Paipa	5 hoops
Gold medal – first place	2022 Paipa	3 ribbons + 2 balls

Giovanna Oliveira Silva (born 30 September 1998) is a retired Brazilian rhythmic gymnastics, member of the national group.

== Personal life ==
Oliveira took up the sport at age seven in Maua, she moved out of state and left her parents at thirteen to follow her passion. Her dream is to compete at the Olympic Games like her idols, Camila Ferezin (her actual coach), Morgana Gmach, Linoy Ashram and Katsiaryna Halkina. She's studying accounting at the Pontifical Catholic University of Parana.

== Career ==
She won team bronze at the 2013 Gymnasiade, in 2022 she entered the senior national group rooster getting to compete at two World Cups, Portimão where the group was 5th in the All-Around and with 5 hoops and 4th with 3 ribbons and 2 balls, and Pesaro where they finished 4th in the All-Around, 8th with 5 hoops and won bronze with 3 ribbons and 2 balls, the first World Cup medal since 2013 and only the second ever for Brazil. In July she won gold in the All-Around and 5 hoops as well as silver with 3 ribbons and 2 balls at the 2022 Pan American Gymnastics Championships in Rio de Janeiro along Maria Eduarda Arakaki, Déborah Medrado, Nicole Pircio, Gabrielle da Silva and Bárbara Urquiza.

In September 2022 she was selected for the World Championships in Sofia along Maria Arakaki, Deborah Medrado, Gabrielle Moraes, Nicole Pircio, Barbara Urquiza and the two individuals Geovanna Santos and Barbara Domingos, finishing 10th in teams, 5th in the All-Around, 4th with 5 hoops and 10th with 3 ribbons and 2 balls. From November 28 to December 4 Giovanna competed at the 2022 South American Rhythmic Gymnastics Championships where the Brazilian group won gold in the All-Around, with 5 hoops and with 3 ribbons and 2 balls with Maria Eduarda Arakaki, Victória Borges, Bárbara Galvão, Sofia Madeira and Nicole Pírcio.
