= Russak =

Russak is a surname. Notable people with the surname include:

- Marie Russak (1865–1945), American opera singer and architect
- Rakefet Russak-Aminoach (born 1966), Israeli business executive

== See also ==
- Rusak
