= Maria Eduarda Arakaki =

Brazilian rhythmic gymnast

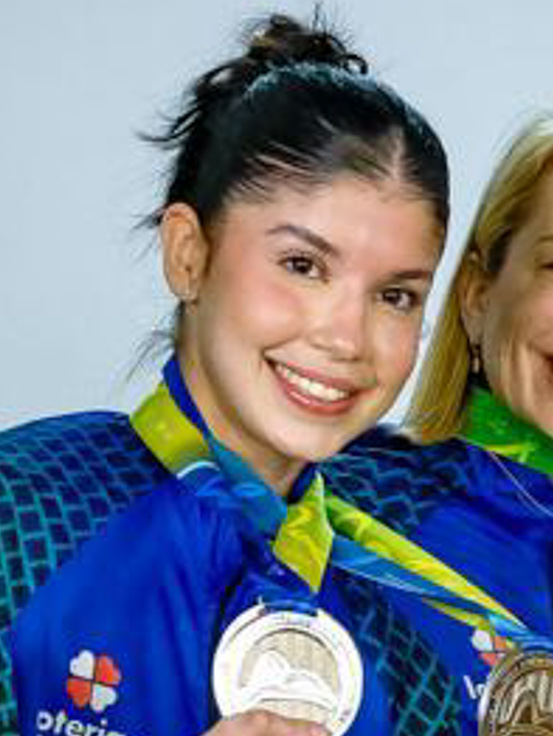
- Arakaki in 2025

Personal information
- Full name: Maria Eduarda De Almeida Arakaki
- Nickname: Duda
- Born: 12 August 2003 (age 23) Maceió, Alagoas, Brazil
- Height: 173 cm (5 ft 8 in)

Gymnastics career
- Discipline: Rhythmic gymnastics
- Country represented: Brazil; (2018-)
- Club: Colégio Marista de Maceió
- Head coaches: Carla Cabus, Camila Ferezin
Medal record
Rhythmic gymnastics
Representing Brazil
Event	1st	2nd	3rd
FIG World Cup	3	4	3
FIG World Challenge Cup	3	4	1
Total	6	8	4
World Championships
Gold medal – first place	2026 Frankfurt	5 balls
Gold medal – first place	2026 Frankfurt	3 hoops + 4 clubs
Silver medal – second place	2025 Rio de Janeiro	Group all-around
Silver medal – second place	2025 Rio de Janeiro	3 balls + 2 hoops
Bronze medal – third place	2026 Frankfurt	Group all-around
Pan American Championships
Gold medal – first place	2021 Rio de Janeiro	Group all-around
Gold medal – first place	2021 Rio de Janeiro	5 balls
Gold medal – first place	2021 Rio de Janeiro	3 hoops + 4 clubs
Gold medal – first place	2022 Rio de Janeiro	Group all-around
Gold medal – first place	2022 Rio de Janeiro	5 hoops
Gold medal – first place	2023 Guadalajara	Group all-around
Gold medal – first place	2023 Guadalajara	5 hoops
Gold medal – first place	2023 Guadalajara	3 ribbons + 2 balls
Gold medal – first place	2024 Guatemala City	5 hoops
Gold medal – first place	2026 Rio de Janeiro	Group all-around
Gold medal – first place	2026 Rio de Janeiro	5 balls
Gold medal – first place	2026 Rio de Janeiro	3 hoops + 4 clubs
Silver medal – second place	2022 Rio de Janeiro	3 ribbons + 2 balls
Silver medal – second place	2024 Guatemala City	Group all-around
Silver medal – second place	2024 Guatemala City	3 ribbons + 2 balls
South American Games
Gold medal – first place	2026 Santa Fe	Group All-Around
Gold medal – first place	2026 Santa Fe	5 Balls
Gold medal – first place	2026 Santa Fe	3 Hoops + 4 Clubs
South American Championships
Gold medal – first place	2022 Paipa	All-around team
Gold medal – first place	2022 Paipa	Group all-around
Gold medal – first place	2022 Paipa	5 hoops
Gold medal – first place	2022 Paipa	3 ribbons + 2 balls

Maria Eduarda De Almeida "Duda" Arakaki (born 12 August 2003) is a Brazilian rhythmic gymnast who has competed as both an individual and group member. She represented Brazil at the 2018 Summer Youth Olympics in the individual all-around, and at the 2020 Summer Olympics and 2024 Summer Olympics in the group all-around.

== Career ==
Arakaki began rhythmic gymnastics when she was six years old.

=== Junior ===
She competed at the 2018 Junior Pan American Championships and won the bronze medal in the team event and finished sixth in the individual all-around. She won the gold medal in the all-around at the 2018 South American Youth Championships. She competed at the 2018 Summer Youth Olympics in Buenos Aires. In the individual all-around, she finished thirty-fourth in the qualification round. Additionally, in the mixed multi-discipline team event, her team finished seventh. In 2019, she had surgery on her knee and did not compete that year.

=== Senior ===
==== 2020-2021 ====
Arakaki began training with Brazil's senior group in 2020. Her first major competition with the group was the 2021 Pan American Championships in Rio de Janeiro. The group won the gold medal in the group all-around and secured the continental quota place for the 2020 Olympic Games. They additionally won the gold medals in both the 5 balls and the 3 hoops + 4 clubs event finals.

Arakaki was selected to compete for Brazil at the 2020 Summer Olympics in the group all-around alongside Beatriz Linhares, Déborah Medrado, Nicole Pírcio, and Geovanna Santos. They finished twelfth in the qualification round for the group all-around.

==== 2022 ====
She continued being part of a national team after the Olympics. At the 2022 World Cup Pesaro, her group won the bronze medal in the 3 ribbons + 2 balls final, which was her first World Cup medal. She then competed with Nicole Pircio, Déborah Medrado, Gabrielle da Silva, Giovanna Oliveira, and Bárbara Galvão at the 2022 Pan American Championships, where they successfully defended their group all-around title. They also won gold in the 5 hoops event finals, and they won the silver behind Mexico in the 3 ribbons + 2 balls final. The same group then competed at the 2022 World Championships in Sofia, where they finished fifth in the group all-around. They also qualified for the 5 hoops final, where they finished fourth.

==== 2023 ====
In 2023, Arakaki won two bronze medals in the group all-around at the World Cups in Athens and Cluj Napoca. At the Portimão World Challenge Cup, she was part of the group that won a historic gold medal in the 5 hoops final. The group was 8th in the all-around. On 14–16 July, they competed at Cluj-Napoca World Challenge Cup and won the bronze medal in the all-around. They also won gold with 3 ribbons + 2 balls and silver in the 5 hoops final. Later that year, Arakaki represented Brazil at the 2023 World Championships in Valencia, Spain, where she and her teammates finished in 6th place in the group all-around and secured a quota place for the 2024 Olympic Games. They took 4th place in the 5 hoops final and 8th place in the team competition.

==== 2024 ====
On 10–12 May, she and her group won the gold medal in the 3 ribbons + 2 balls final and silver in the group all-around and 5 hoops final at the Portimão World Challenge Cup. At the Pan American Championships in Guatemala City, the Brazilian group won the gold medal in 5 hoops and won the silver in the all-around and 3 ribbons and 2 balls behind Mexico. On 21–23 June, they competed at Milan World Cup and won silver medals in both the group all-around and 5 hoops final. The next month, they won another silver medal in the group all-around at Cluj-Napoca World Challenge Cup.

In August 2024, Arakaki represented Brazil at the 2024 Summer Olympics alongside her team members Victória Borges, Déborah Medrado, Sofia Pereira, and Nicole Pircio. During the qualification round for the group all-around, the Brazilian group stood in fourth place after their first routine, 5 hoops. In the end they finished in ninth place, just outside of reaching the finals, due to group member Victória Borges injuring herself minutes before their second qualification routine (3 ribbons and 2 balls).

==== 2025 ====
Arakaki, Nicole Pircio and Sofia Pereira were the only team members who continued after the Olympics and continued training in 2025. Together with new team members Maria Paula Caminha, Mariana Gonçalves, Ana Luiza Franceschi and Bárbara Urquiza, they presented new routines at Portimão World Challenge Cup and won gold medals in group all-around, 5 ribbons and 3 balls + 2 hoops. On 18–20 July, the group won the gold medal in the all-around at Milan World Cup. They also won the gold medal in the 5 ribbons final and bronze with 3 balls and 2 hoops.

In late August, she was selected to represent Brazil at the 2025 World Championships in Rio de Janeiro, alongside Maria Paula Caminha, Mariana Vitória Gonçalves, Sofia Pereira and Nicole Pircio. They won silver medal in group all-around, 0.3 point behind Japan, being the first Pan-American medal winners of the World Championships. They won another silver medal in 3 balls + 2 hoops and took 6th place in 5 ribbons final.

==== 2026 ====
In April, she and her group started the season competing at Baku World Cup, and taking 5th place in all-around. They won silver medal in 5 Balls final. Then they competed at Tashkent World Cup, and ended on 7th place in all-around. They won silver medal in 3 Hoops + 4 Clubs final. On June 5-7, Arakaki and her teammates (Maria Paula Caminha, Mariana Vitória Gonçalves, Julia Kurunczi, Sofia Pereira, Nicole Pircio) represented Brazil at the 2026 Pan American Championships in Rio de Janeiro, and won three gold medals (Group all-around, 5 Balls, 3 Hoops + 4 Clubs). In July, they competed at Milan World Cup and took gold medal in all-around in front of China and Spain. They also won silver medal in 5 Balls final.

In August, she was part of the group that represented Brazil at the 2026 World Championships in Frankfurt, Germany. They won bronze medal in all-around behind Spain and Japan, and also won an Olympic quota for the 2028 Olympic Games. In team competition they placed 7th alongside Bárbara Domingos, Geovanna Santos and Maria Eduarda Alexandre. They took gold medals in both apparatus finals (5 balls and 3 hoops + 4 clubs). This was the first time any country from Americas won gold medal at Rhythmic Gymnastics World Championships.

== Achievements ==
- First and only group from the Americas to win a medal at the Rhythmic Gymnastics World Championships (silver in 2025 World Championships).
- First and only group from the Americas to win a gold medal at the Rhythmic Gymnastics World Championships (in 2026 World Championships).
- Part of the first Brazilian group to win a gold medal at a World Cup series event (5 hoops at the 2023 Portimão World Challenge Cup).

== Personal life ==
She studies Physical Education at Estácio de Sá University in Rio de Janeiro. Since 2024, she has been dating a lawyer Marcos Ygor.
