= 2023 Pan American Rhythmic Gymnastics Championships =

International sports competition

- Venue: Polideportivo López Mateos
- Location: Guadalajara, Mexico
- Start date: 8 June 2023
- End date: 11 June 2023

The 2023 Pan American Rhythmic Gymnastics Championships was held in Guadalajara, Mexico, June 8-11 2023. The competitionalso served as a qualifier for the 2023 World Championships.

== Participating countries ==
- Argentina
- Bolivia
- Brazil
- Canada
- Chile
- Colombia
- Costa Rica
- Cuba
- El Salvador
- Guatemala
- Mexico
- Peru
- Puerto Rico
- United States
- Venezuela

== Competition schedule ==
All times in local time (UTC−06:00).

- Thursday, 8 June
  - 09:00 - 10:40 - Junior Individual Qualification: Hoop and Ball (Group A)
  - 10:50 - 12:20 - Junior Individual Qualification: Hoop and Ball (Group B)
  - 13:00 - 13:40 - Junior Group Qualification: 5 Ropes
- Friday, 9 June
  - 09:00 - 10:40 - Junior Individual Qualification: Clubs and Ribbon (Group A)
  - 10:50 - 12:20 - Junior Individual Qualification: Clubs and Ribbon (Group B)
  - 13:00 - 13:40 - Junior Group Qualification: 5 Balls
  - 16:00 - 17:30 - Senior Individual Qualification: Hoop and Ball (Group A)
  - 17:40 - 19:10 - Senior Individual Qualification: Hoop and Ball (Group B)
  - 20:00 - 20:55 - Senior Group Qualification: 5 Hoops
- Saturday, 10 June
  - 09:00 - 10:00 - Junior Individual Finals: Hoop and Ball
  - 10:10 - 10:50 - Junior Group Final: 5 Ropes
  - 11:20 - 12:20 - Junior Individual Finals: Clubs and Ribbon
  - 12:30 - 13:10 - Junior Group Final: 5 Balls
  - 16:00 - 17:30 - Senior Individual Qualification: Clubs and Ribbon (Group A)
  - 17:40 - 19:10 - Senior Individual Qualification: Clubs and Ribbon (Group B)
  - 20:00 - 20:55 - Senior Group Qualification: 3 Ribbons + 2 Balls
- Sunday, 11 June
  - 10:00 a 11:00 - Senior Individual Finals: Hoop and Ball
  - 11:10 a 11:50 - Senior Group Final: 5 Hoops
  - 12:20 a 13:20 - Individual Finals: Clubs and Ribbon
  - 13:30 a 14:10 - Senior Group Final: 3 Ribbons + 2 Balls

== Medal winners ==
=== Senior ===
Event	Gold	Silver	Bronze
Team
Team	Brazil; Bárbara Domingos; Geovanna Santos	United States; Evita Griskenas; Alexandria Kautzman	Canada; Tatiana Cocsanova; Carmel Kallemaa; Suzanna Shahbazian
Individual Finals
All-Around	(Brazil) Bárbara Domingos	(Brazil) Geovanna Santos	(United States) Evita Griskenas
Hoop	(Brazil) Geovanna Santos	(Brazil) Bárbara Domingos	(United States) Evita Griskenas
Ball	(Mexico) Marina Malpica	(Brazil) Geovanna Santos	(United States) Alexandria Kautzman
Clubs	(Brazil) Bárbara Domingos	(United States) Alexandria Kautzman	(Brazil) Geovanna Santos
Ribbon	(Brazil) Bárbara Domingos	(Brazil) Geovanna Santos	(Canada) Tatiana Cocsanova
Group Finals
All-Around	Brazil; Maria Eduarda Arakaki; Nicole Pircio; Barbara Urquiza; Déborah Medrado; Sofia Pereira; Giovanna Oliveira	Mexico; Nicole Cejudo; Ana Flores; Julia Gutierrez; Kimberly Salazar; Adirem Tejeda; Karen Villanueva	United States; Isabelle Connor; Daria Merkulova; Gergana Petkova; Karolina Saverino; Hana Starkman; Katerine Sakhnov
5 Hoops	Brazil; Maria Eduarda Arakaki; Nicole Pircio; Barbara Urquiza; Déborah Medrado; Sofia Pereira; Giovanna Oliveira	Mexico; Nicole Cejudo; Ana Flores; Julia Gutierrez; Kimberly Salazar; Adirem Tejeda; Karen Villanueva	United States; Isabelle Connor; Daria Merkulova; Gergana Petkova; Karolina Saverino; Hana Starkman; Katerine Sakhnov
3 Ribbons + 2 Balls	Brazil; Maria Eduarda Arakaki; Nicole Pircio; Barbara Urquiza; Déborah Medrado; Sofia Pereira; Giovanna Oliveira	Mexico; Nicole Cejudo; Ana Flores; Julia Gutierrez; Kimberly Salazar; Adirem Tejeda; Karen Villanueva	Canada; Katherina Bakhmutova; Victoria Smolianova; Karin Kamenetsky; Christina Savchenko; Emily Huseynov; Elizabet Piskunov

=== Junior ===
Event	Gold	Silver	Bronze
Team
Team	United States; Rin Keys; Megan Chu; Erika Rusak	Mexico; Amanda Bosch; Valentina Moya; Constanza Galindo	Brazil; Keila Santos; Fernanda Alvaz; Letícia Evangelista
Individual Finals
All-Around	(United States) Rin Keys	(United States) Megan Chu	(Mexico) Amanda Bosch
Hoop	(United States) Rin Keys	(United States) Erika Rusak	(Brazil) Keila Santos
Ball	(United States) Rin Keys	(United States) Megan Chu	(Mexico) Valentina Moya
Clubs	(Mexico) Amanda Bosch	(United States) Rin Keys	(Mexico) Valentina Moya
Ribbon	(United States) Megan Chu	(Mexico) Amanda Bosch	(United States) Rin Keys
Group Finals
All-Around	Brazil; Laura Gamboa; Isadora Beduschi; Yumi Rodrigues; Ana Luiza Franceschi; Maria Paula Caminha; Lavinia Silvério	United States; Annabella Hantov; Greta Pavilonyte; Kristina Lee; Goda Balsys; Alaini Spata	Mexico; Lili De León; Ivanna Rodriguez; Samantha Reyes; Daniela Guzmán; Mariela Lozano; Barbara Ponce
5 Balls	Brazil; Laura Gamboa; Isadora Beduschi; Yumi Rodrigues; Ana Luiza Franceschi; Maria Paula Caminha; Lavinia Silvério	United States; Annabella Hantov; Greta Pavilonyte; Kristina Lee; Goda Balsys; Alaini Spata	Mexico; Lili De León; Ivanna Rodriguez; Samantha Reyes; Daniela Guzmán; Mariela Lozano; Barbara Ponce
5 Ropes	Brazil; Laura Gamboa; Isadora Beduschi; Yumi Rodrigues; Ana Luiza Franceschi; Maria Paula Caminha; Lavinia Silvério	Mexico; Lili De León; Ivanna Rodriguez; Samantha Reyes; Daniela Guzmán; Mariela Lozano; Barbara Ponce	United States; Annabella Hantov; Greta Pavilonyte; Kristina Lee; Goda Balsys; Alaini Spata

== Results ==
=== Senior team ===
Rank	Nation	Hoop (rhythmic gymnastics)	Ball (rhythmic gymnastics)	Clubs (rhythmic gymnastics)	Ribbon (rhythmic gymnastics)	Total
1st place, gold medalist(s)	Brazil	64.900	63.150	62.700	61.150	251.900
2nd place, silver medalist(s)	United States	56.750	61.500	61.250	59.600	239.100
3rd place, bronze medalist(s)	Canada	57.350	56.350	54.450	54.900	223.050
4	Mexico	59.650	56.000	53.400	50.000	219.050
5	Colombia	55.800	54.550	52.050	54.050	216.450
6	Argentina	56.200	55.900	54.750	49.050	215.900
7	Chile	50.550	52.750	44.950	45.250	193.500
8	Cuba	48.700	44.450	49.750	49.200	192.100
9	Venezuela	50.450	47.050	47.150	47.250	191.900
10	Puerto Rico	49.450	48.700	45.350	46.950	190.450
11	Bolivia	47.900	40.850	45.800	48.150	182.700
12	Peru	44.700	48.600	40.300	44.200	177.800
13	El Salvador	41.250	43.900	39.850	37.500	162.500
14	Costa Rica	26.850	21.250	24.750	23.750	96.600
15	Guatemala	25.150	24.850	21.950	20.700	92.650

=== Senior Individual ===
==== All-Around ====
Rank	Gymnast	Nation	Hoop (rhythmic gymnastics)	Ball (rhythmic gymnastics)	Clubs (rhythmic gymnastics)	Ribbon (rhythmic gymnastics)	Total
1st place, gold medalist(s)	Bárbara Domingos	Brazil	32.500	32.100	31.100	32.250	127.950
2nd place, silver medalist(s)	Geovanna Santos	Brazil	32.400	31.050	31.600	28.900	123.950
3rd place, bronze medalist(s)	Evita Griskenas	United States	31.400	30.100	30.500	31.100	123.100
4	Alexandria Kautzman	United States	25.350	31.400	30.750	28.500	116.000
5	Celeste D'Arcángelo	Argentina	30.000	29.000	28.550	25.950	113.500
6	Marina Malpica	Mexico	33.150	28.500	25.850	24.950	112.450
7	Oriana Viñas	Colombia	28.300	27.900	26.650	27.400	110.250
8	Lina Dussan	Colombia	27.500	26.650	25.400	26.650	106.200
9	Gretel Mendoza	Cuba	27.800	24.350	26.350	27.500	106.000
10	Javiera Rubilar	Chile	25.600	27.950	24.700	24.000	102.250
11	Sophia Fernandez	Venezuela	26.050	24.600	25.750	22.700	99.100
12	Gloriana Sánchez	Costa Rica	26.850	21.250	24.750	23.750	96.600
13	Sofía Lay	Peru	22.550	25.950	21.950	24.400	94.850
14	Camille Maldonado	Puerto Rico	24.150	23.750	22.650	23.350	93.900
15	María González	Guatemala	25.150	24.850	21.950	20.700	92.650
16	Fabiana Abastoflor	Bolivia	21.600	20.300	22.450	22.800	87.150
17	Leslie Porras	Guatemala	21.050	22.150	20.800	22.850	86.850
18	Tatiana Cocsanova	Canada	28.800	30.050	—	27.400	86.250
19	Ariana Rosales	El Salvador	22.400	22.950	20.650	17.800	83.800
20	Carmel Kallemaa	Canada	28.550	—	27.250	27.500	83.300
21	Isabella Orellana	El Salvador	18.850	20.950	19.200	19.700	78.700
22	Karla Díaz	Mexico	26.500	—	27.550	—	54.050
23	Agostina Vargas	Argentina	—	26.900	26.200	—	53.100
24	Mayte Guzman	Bolivia	26.300	—	—	25.350	51.650

==== Senior Hoop ====
Rank	Gymnast	Nation	D Score	A Score	E Score	Pen.	Total
1st place, gold medalist(s)	Geovanna Santos	Brazil	15.900	8.450	8.550		32.900
2nd place, silver medalist(s)	Bárbara Domingos	Brazil	15.900	8.550	8.350		32.800
3rd place, bronze medalist(s)	Evita Griskenas	United States	15.700	8.450	8.600	0.10	32.650
4	Tatiana Cocsanova	Canada	14.300	8.300	8.100		30.700
5	Celeste D'Arcángelo	Argentina	14.500	7.750	7.550		29.800
6	Oriana Viñas	Colombia	13.200	8.150	7.550	0.10	28.800
7	Carmel Kallemaa	Canada	12.500	7.800	7.400		27.700
8	Marina Malpica	Mexico	13.800	7.800	6.700	0.95	27.350

==== Senior Ball ====
Rank	Gymnast	Nation	D Score	A Score	E Score	Pen.	Total
1st place, gold medalist(s)	Marina Malpica	Mexico	14.900	8.650	8.350		31.900
2nd place, silver medalist(s)	Geovanna Santos	Brazil	14.600	8.550	8.450		31.600
3rd place, bronze medalist(s)	Alexandria Kautzman	United States	14.400	8.550	8.150		31.100
4	Tatiana Cocsanova	Canada	13.300	8.150	8.500		29.950
5	Bárbara Domingos	Brazil	13.900	8.050	7.400	0.30	29.050
6	Oriana Viñas	Colombia	12.300	8.300	8.000	0.10	28.500
7	Javiera Rubilar	Chile	10.600	7.700	7.300		25.600
8	Celeste D'Arcángelo	Argentina	11.400	7.550	6.750	0.15	25.550

- (United States) Evita Griskenas withdrew and was replaced by (Colombia) Oriana Viñas.

==== Senior Clubs ====
Rank	Gymnast	Nation	D Score	A Score	E Score	Pen.	Total
1st place, gold medalist(s)	Bárbara Domingos	Brazil	14.200	8.600	8.300		31.100
2nd place, silver medalist(s)	Alexandria Kautzman	United States	14.500	8.350	7.900	0.05	30.700
3rd place, bronze medalist(s)	Geovanna Santos	Brazil	13.900	8.500	8.050		30.450
4	Carmel Kallemaa	Canada	13.700	8.350	8.050		30.100
5	Celeste D'Arcángelo	Argentina	14.000	8.150	7.900		30.050
6	Suzanna Shahbazian	Canada	12.600	8.450	8.050		29.100
7	Oriana Viñas	Colombia	10.400	8.400	7.650	0.05	26.400
8	Karla Díaz	Mexico	10.100	7.700	7.150		24.950

- (United States) Evita Griskenas withdrew and was replaced by (Colombia) Oriana Viñas.

==== Senior Ribbon ====
Rank	Gymnast	Nation	D Score	A Score	E Score	Pen.	Total
1st place, gold medalist(s)	Bárbara Domingos	Brazil	15.700	8.500	8.350		32.550
2nd place, silver medalist(s)	Geovanna Santos	Brazil	14.700	8.450	8.150		31.300
3rd place, bronze medalist(s)	Tatiana Cocsanova	Canada	14.200	7.950	8.050		30.200
4	Carmel Kallemaa	Canada	13.000	8.100	7.950		29.050
5	Alexandria Kautzman	United States	12.700	8.050	7.850		28.600
6	Oriana Viñas	Colombia	12.000	8.000	7.650		27.650
7	Lina Dussan	Colombia	12.700	7.700	7.100		27.500
8	Gretel Mendoza	Cuba	11.800	7.100	6.150		25.050

- (United States) Evita Griskenas withdrew and was replaced by (Colombia) Lina Dussan.

=== Senior Group ===
==== All-Around ====
Rank	Nation	5	3, 2	Total
1st place, gold medalist(s)	Brazil	32.700	28.150	60.850
2nd place, silver medalist(s)	Mexico	30.000	28.200	58.200
3rd place, bronze medalist(s)	United States	28.150	23.150	51.300
4	Canada	24.500	20.300	44.800
5	Venezuela	24.750	17.050	41.800
6	Chile	24.350	17.200	41.550
7	Colombia	21.500	18.050	39.550
8	Costa Rica	18.550	16.250	34.800
9	Argentina	20.150	13.650	33.800
10	Cuba	17.400	16.100	33.500
11	Guatemala	15.850	13.450	29.300

==== 5 Hoops ====
Rank	Nation	D Score	A Score	E Score	Pen.	Total
1st place, gold medalist(s)	Brazil	19.100	8.450	7.650	0.05	35.150
2nd place, silver medalist(s)	Mexico	16.900	7.850	6.650	0.10	31.300
3rd place, bronze medalist(s)	United States	15.500	6.850	5.450	0.05	27.750
4	Venezuela	14.100	6.550	5.750		26.400
5	Chile	11.300	6.050	5.450		22.800
6	Canada	12.900	6.000	2.950	0.05	21.800
7	Colombia	10.300	5.850	2.450	0.60	18.000
8	Argentina	9.000	4.700	1.650	0.60	14.750

==== 3 Ribbons + 2 Balls ====
Rank	Nation	D Score	A Score	E Score	Pen.	Total
1st place, gold medalist(s)	Brazil	15.300	8.200	6.500		30.000
2nd place, silver medalist(s)	Mexico	14.600	7.900	5.900	0.35	28.050
3rd place, bronze medalist(s)	Canada	13.600	7.000	4.550		25.150
4	United States	12.000	7.400	5.450		24.850
5	Venezuela	10.200	6.650	5.300	0.30	21.850
6	Colombia	8.900	6.750	4.200	0.10	19.750
7	Chile	8.400	6.150	5.000		19.550
8	Costa Rica	8.800	6.100	4.050	0.05	18.900

=== Junior team ===
Rank	Nation	Hoop (rhythmic gymnastics)	Ball (rhythmic gymnastics)	Clubs (rhythmic gymnastics)	Ribbon (rhythmic gymnastics)	Total
1st place, gold medalist(s)	United States	87.500	89.900	57.900	59.000	294.300
2nd place, silver medalist(s)	Mexico	77.550	80.300	51.800	52.400	262.050
3rd place, bronze medalist(s)	Brazil	80.450	75.350	51.150	52.250	259.200
4	Canada	52.100	77.350	77.300	49.500	256.250
5	Argentina	69.100	43.750	46.500	70.950	230.300
6	Venezuela	65.650	23.600	67.900	64.700	221.850
7	Colombia	70.950	41.600	65.000	42.450	220.000
8	Chile	67.700	40.350	41.850	67.250	217.150
9	Costa Rica	61.050	55.600	39.650	38.900	195.200

=== Junior Individual ===
==== All-Around ====
Rank	Gymnast	Nation	Hoop (rhythmic gymnastics)	Ball (rhythmic gymnastics)	Clubs (rhythmic gymnastics)	Ribbon (rhythmic gymnastics)	Total
1st place, gold medalist(s)	Rin Keys	United States	31.150	30.700	29.700	30.300	121.850
2nd place, silver medalist(s)	Megan Chu	United States	27.950	30.000	28.200	28.700	114.850
3rd place, bronze medalist(s)	Amanda Bosch	Mexico	28.600	28.300	26.950	26.200	110.050
4	Veronika Drevylo	Canada	27.550	28.400	26.900	26.650	109.500
5	Keila Santos	Brazil	26.850	25.050	26.200	25.850	103.950
6	Fernanda Alvaz	Brazil	26.800	25.750	24.950	26.400	103.900
7	Valentina Moya	Mexico	24.450	27.300	24.850	26.200	102.800
8	Jimena Dominguez	Venezuela	26.150	23.600	24.300	24.250	98.300
9	Jana Alemam	Canada	20.350	25.150	26.200	22.850	94.550
10	Livia Bustos	Argentina	22.300	21.400	23.100	24.650	91.450
11	Camila Arce	Argentina	23.400	20.450	23.400	24.100	91.350
12	Emiliana Vargas	Colombia	25.450	21.350	20.750	22.200	89.750
13	Juliana Villareal	Colombia	23.150	20.250	23.900	20.250	87.550
14	Josefa Cornejo	Chile	21.850	20.350	18.750	24.800	85.750
15	Laura Rich	Chile	21.750	20.000	20.950	21.900	84.600
16	Thaycaramaloa Arias	Venezuela	19.600	17.450	21.000	21.800	79.850
17	Zhara Rocabado	Bolivia	19.600	20.250	16.850	18.650	75.350
18	Maria Baltodano	Costa Rica	18.200	18.300	19.250	18.950	74.700
19	Maria Acunã	Costa Rica	20.750	18.600	17.650	17.500	74.500
20	Ines Pereyra	Bolivia	18.950	19.000	18.000	17.750	73.700
21	Valeria Carias	El Salvador	16.850	18.700	18.000	19.800	73.350
22	Maria Castillo	El Salvador	11.600	14.350	16.550	15.700	58.200

==== Junior Hoop ====
Rank	Gymnast	Nation	D Score	A Score	E Score	Pen.	Total
1st place, gold medalist(s)	Rin Keys	United States	13.200	8.500	8.800		30.500
2nd place, silver medalist(s)	Erika Rusak	United States	12.300	8.050	8.550		28.900
3rd place, bronze medalist(s)	Keila Santos	Brazil	11.200	7.800	7.600		26.600
4	Letícia Evangelista	Brazil	11.500	7.550	7.250	0.05	26.250
5	Amanda Bosch	Mexico	11.700	7.750	6.800	0.05	26.200
6	Veronika Drevylo	Canada	11.200	7.150	7.300	0.10	25.550
7	Jimena Dominguez	Venezuela	10.700	7.250	7.150	0.10	25.000
8	Emiliana Vargas	Colombia	10.100	7.150	7.400		24.650

==== Junior Ball ====
Rank	Gymnast	Nation	D Score	A Score	E Score	Pen.	Total
1st place, gold medalist(s)	Rin Keys	United States	14.100	8.400	8.500		31.000
2nd place, silver medalist(s)	Megan Chu	United States	13.200	8.250	8.600	0.05	30.000
3rd place, bronze medalist(s)	Valentina Moya	Mexico	12.000	8.150	8.050	0.05	28.150
4	Amanda Bosch	Mexico	11.800	8.000	8.200		28.000
4	Keila Santos	Brazil	11.800	8.100	8.100		28.000
5	Veronika Drevylo	Canada	12.300	7.600	7.750		27.650
6	Jana Alemam	Canada	12.500	7.550	7.450		27.500
7	Fernanda Alvaz	Brazil	9.900	7.950	7.950		25.800

==== Junior Clubs ====
Rank	Gymnast	Nation	D Score	A Score	E Score	Pen.	Total
1st place, gold medalist(s)	Amanda Bosch	Mexico	12.500	8.300	8.350		29.150
2nd place, silver medalist(s)	Rin Keys	United States	12.600	8.300	8.200	0.05	29.050
3rd place, bronze medalist(s)	Valentina Moya	Mexico	12.100	7.950	8.400		28.450
4	Keila Santos	Brazil	11.700	7.950	8.300		27.950
5	Fernanda Alvaz	Brazil	10.700	7.750	7.900		26.350
6	Megan Chu	United States	10.900	7.950	7.500	0.05	26.300
7	Jana Alemam	Canada	10.500	7.400	7.350		25.250
8	Veronika Drevylo	Canada	9.300	7.550	7.200		24.050

==== Junior Ribbon ====
Rank	Gymnast	Nation	D Score	A Score	E Score	Pen.	Total
1st place, gold medalist(s)	Megan Chu	United States	13.100	8.250	8.450	0.05	29.750
2nd place, silver medalist(s)	Amanda Bosch	Mexico	12.600	8.200	8.000		28.800
3rd place, bronze medalist(s)	Rin Keys	United States	11.700	8.300	7.850		27.850
4	Valentina Moya	Mexico	10.700	8.100	8.100		26.900
5	Keila Santos	Brazil	10.100	8.100	7.950		26.150
6	Fernanda Alvaz	Brazil	10.300	7.850	7.450		25.600
7	Veronika Drevylo	Canada	9.600	7.850	7.150		24.600
8	Josefa Cornejo	Chile	6.600	7.550	6.300		20.450

=== Junior Group ===
==== All-Around ====
Rank	Nation	5	5	Total
1st place, gold medalist(s)	Brazil	24.950	28.350	53.300
2nd place, silver medalist(s)	United States	24.250	26.800	51.050
3rd place, bronze medalist(s)	Mexico	21.600	21.650	43.250
4	Canada	21.300	21.350	42.650
5	Chile	16.700	17.800	34.500
6	Colombia	14.700	18.900	33.600
7	Argentina	13.750	16.900	30.650
8	Bolivia	10.450	11.150	21.600

==== 5 Balls ====
Rank	Nation	D Score	A Score	E Score	Pen.	Total
1st place, gold medalist(s)	Brazil	12.400	8.150	7.750		28.300
2nd place, silver medalist(s)	United States	12.600	7.450	7.000		27.050
3rd place, bronze medalist(s)	Mexico	11.900	7.650	6.750		26.300
4	Canada	11.500	6.450	6.100		24.050
5	Colombia	8.900	6.250	5.150		20.300
6	Chile	8.300	6.200	4.950		19.450
7	Argentina	7.800	6.000	5.300		19.100
8	Bolivia	5.400	6.000	3.950		15.350

==== 5 Ropes ====
Rank	Nation	D Score	A Score	E Score	Pen.	Total
1st place, gold medalist(s)	Brazil	10.800	7.900	7.050		25.750
2nd place, silver medalist(s)	Mexico	11.300	7.400	6.550		25.250
3rd place, bronze medalist(s)	United States	10.200	6.900	6.450		23.550
4	Canada	8.600	6.450	4.900	0.05	19.900
5	Colombia	7.800	6.150	4.350		18.300
6	Chile	5.500	6.100	3.950	0.30	15.250
7	Argentina	6.900	5.400	2.850	0.30	14.850
8	Bolivia	4.300	5.700	2.600	0.60	12.000

== Medal count ==
=== Overall ===
* Host nation (Mexico)

Rank	Nation	Gold	Silver	Bronze	Total
1	Brazil (BRA)	11	4	3	18
2	United States (USA)	5	8	7	20
3	Mexico (MEX)*	2	6	5	13
4	Canada (CAN)	0	0	3	3
Totals (4 entries)		18	18	18	54

=== Senior ===
* Host nation (Mexico)

Rank	Nation	Gold	Silver	Bronze	Total
1	Brazil (BRA)	8	4	1	13
2	Mexico (MEX)*	1	3	0	4
3	United States (USA)	0	2	5	7
4	Canada (CAN)	0	0	3	3
Totals (4 entries)		9	9	9	27

=== Junior ===
* Host nation (Mexico)

Rank	Nation	Gold	Silver	Bronze	Total
1	United States (USA)	5	6	2	13
2	Brazil (BRA)	3	0	2	5
3	Mexico (MEX)*	1	3	5	9
Totals (3 entries)		9	9	9	27
