= Erika Rusak =

American rhythmic gymnast (born 2008)

- Born: February 19, 2008 (age 18) Belarus

Gymnastics career
- Discipline: Rhythmic gymnastics
- Country represented: United States; (2021–present)
- Club: Evergreen Rhythmics
- Head coach: Marina Kukhta
Medal record
Rhythmic gymnastics
Representing United States
Junior Pan American Championships
Gold medal – first place	2021 Guatemala City	Team
Gold medal – first place	2023 Guadalajara	Team
Silver medal – second place	2023 Guadalajara	Hoop

Erika Rusak (born February 19, 2008) is an American rhythmic gymnast of Belarusian descent. She won team gold medals at the 2021 and 2023 Junior Pan American Championships.

== Career ==
Rusak made her junior international debut at the 2021 Ritam Cup, finishing seventh in the all-around. At the Irina Deleanu Tournament, she took 13th place. At the 2021 Junior Pan American Championships, she won a gold medal with the American team.

In 2023, she won silver medals in the team and ball events at the Gymnastik International in Schmiden. She won the hoop title at the 2023 Rhythmic Challenge, where she also finished fourth in the all-around. In March, she took 10th place in the all-around at the Aphrodite Cup in Athens. Then in the event finals, she won bronze with clubs and silver with ribbon. In May, she won gold in the all-around and with ball and ribbon, silver with clubs and bronze with hoop at the Ritam Cup. At the Pan American Championships in Guadalajara, she won a gold medal in the team event alongside Rin Keys and Megan Chu. She then won a silver medal in the hoop final, behind Keys.

Rusak became age-eligible for senior competitions in 2024. At the 2024 Rhythmic Challenge, she finished 13th in the all-around, and her best apparatus result was ball, where she finished fourth. At the 2024 USA Gymnastics Championships, she finished seventh in the all-around. As a result, she was added to the senior U.S. national team. She finished 13th in the all-around at the 2025 Rhythmic Challenge. She won the all-around competition among athletes born in 2008 at the 2025 USA Gymnastics Championships.
