= Yumi Rodrigues =

Brazilian rhythmic gymnast

- Full name: Yumi Rodrigues Moriyama
- Born: 14 January 2008 (age 18) Brazil

Gymnastics career
- Discipline: Rhythmic gymnastics
- Country represented: Brazil; (2022-present)
- Club: UNOPAR
- Head coach: Juliana Coradine
Medal record
Representing Brazil
Rhythmic Gymnastics
Junior Pan American Championships
Gold medal – first place	2022 Rio de Janeiro	Group All-Around
Gold medal – first place	2022 Rio de Janeiro	5 Ropes
Gold medal – first place	2022 Rio de Janeiro	5 Balls
Gold medal – first place	2023 Guadalajara	Group All-Around
Gold medal – first place	2023 Guadalajara	5 Ropes
Gold medal – first place	2023 Guadalajara	5 Balls

Yumi Rodrigues Moriyama (born 14 January 2008) is a Brazilian rhythmic gymnast. She's a multiple Pan American champion as a member of the national junior group.

== Career ==
Yumi took up gymnastics at age 7. In March 2022 she was selected for the junior national group along Eloah de Oliveira, Fernanda Heinemann, Isadora Beduschi, Laura Gamboa, Lavinia Silvério and Nicole Vasques. In July they won gold in the All-Around, with 5 ropes and 5 balls at the Pan American Championships.

The following year she again competed at the Pan American Championships winning all three titles. In July she was selected for the Junior World Championships in Cluj-Napoca, finishing 12th in teams, 6th in the All-Around, 6th with 5ropes and 8th with 5 balls. In December she won All-Around gold at the South American Championships as a member of the group of UNOPAR.
