= Isadora Beduschi =

Brazilian rhythmic gymnast

- Full name: Isadora Lucia Beduschi Liberato
- Nickname: Isa
- Born: 26 March 2008 (age 18) Brazil

Gymnastics career
- Discipline: Rhythmic gymnastics
- Country represented: Brazil (2022-present)
- Club: Associacao de Ginastica Artistica de Blumenau
- Assistant coach: Amanda Gallo
- Former coach: Juliana Coradine
Medal record
Representing Brazil
Rhythmic Gymnastics
South American Championships
Gold medal – first place	2025 Cochabamba	Duo + Trio
Gold medal – first place	2025 Cochabamba	Trio
Junior Pan American Championships
Gold medal – first place	2022 Rio de Janeiro	Group all-around
Gold medal – first place	2022 Rio de Janeiro	5 ropes
Gold medal – first place	2022 Rio de Janeiro	5 balls
Gold medal – first place	2023 Guadalajara	Group all-around
Gold medal – first place	2023 Guadalajara	5 ropes
Gold medal – first place	2023 Guadalajara	5 balls

Isadora Lucia Beduschi Liberato (born 26 March 2008) is a Brazilian rhythmic gymnast who is a multiple Junior Pan American champion as a member of the national junior group.

== Career ==
Beduschi took up the sport at age 8 in Blumenau.

=== Junior ===
In March 2022 she was selected for the junior national group along Eloah de Oliveira, Fernanda Heinemann, Laura Gamboa, Yumi Rodrigues, Lavinia Silvério and Nicole Vasques. In July they won gold in the All-Around, with 5 ropes and 5 balls at the Pan American Championships.

The following year she again competed at the Pan American Championships winning all three titles. In July she was selected for the Junior World Championships in Cluj-Napoca, finishing 12th in teams, 6th in the All-Around, 6th with 5ropes and 8th with 5 balls.

=== Senior ===
In September 2025 she was called up to compete in the trio category at the South American Championships in Cochabamba, earning the gold medal in two events.
