= Déborah Medrado =

Brazilian rhythmic gymnast

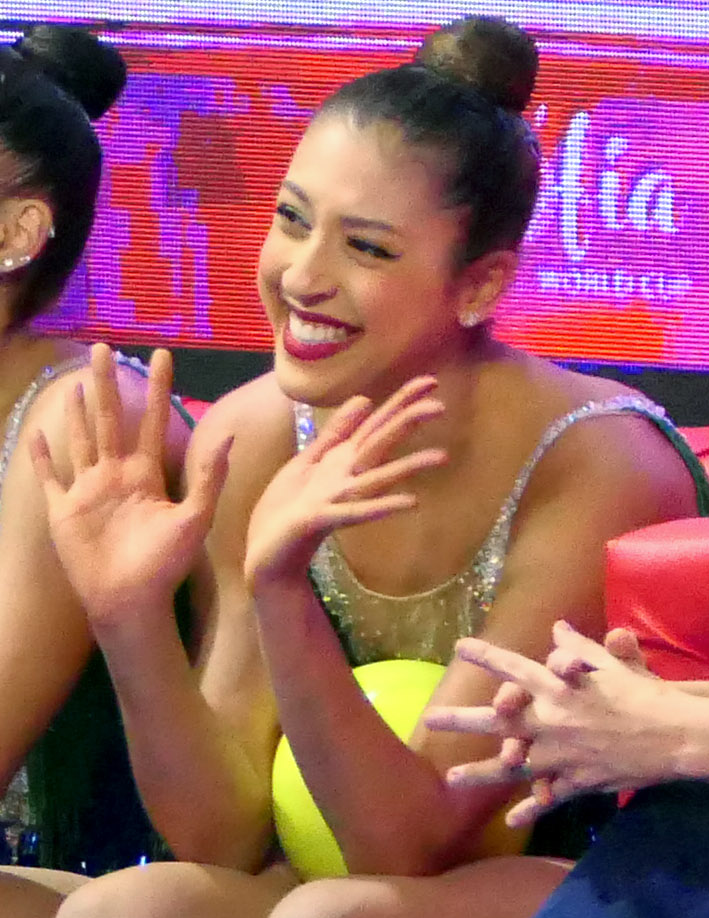
- Medrado in 2024

Personal information
- Full name: Déborah Medrado Barbosa
- Born: July 13, 2002 (age 24) Serra, Espírito Santo, Brazil
- Height: 165 cm (5 ft 5 in)

Gymnastics career
- Discipline: Rhythmic gymnastics
- Country represented: Brazil (2018 - 2024)
- Head coach: Camila Ferezin
- Retired: yes
Medal record
Rhythmic gymnastics
Representing Brazil
Pan American Games
Gold medal – first place	2019 Lima	3 hoops + 4 clubs
Bronze medal – third place	2019 Lima	Group all-around
Bronze medal – third place	2019 Lima	5 balls
Pan American Championships
Gold medal – first place	2018 Lima	5 hoops
Gold medal – first place	2021 Rio de Janeiro	Group all-around
Gold medal – first place	2021 Rio de Janeiro	5 balls
Gold medal – first place	2021 Rio de Janeiro	3 hoops + 4 clubs
Gold medal – first place	2022 Rio de Janeiro	Group all-around
Gold medal – first place	2022 Rio de Janeiro	5 hoops
Gold medal – first place	2023 Guadalajara	Group All-around
Gold medal – first place	2023 Guadalajara	5 hoops
Gold medal – first place	2023 Guadalajara	3 ribbons + 2 balls
Silver medal – second place	2022 Rio de Janeiro	3 ribbons + 2 balls
Bronze medal – third place	2018 Lima	Group all-around
Bronze medal – third place	2018 Lima	3 balls + 2 ropes
South American Games
Gold medal – first place	2018 Cochabamba	Group all-around
Gold medal – first place	2018 Cochabamba	5 hoops
Gold medal – first place	2018 Cochabamba	3 balls + 2 ropes
South American Championships
Gold medal – first place	2019 Bogotá	Group all-around
Gold medal – first place	2019 Bogotá	5 balls
Gold medal – first place	2019 Bogotá	3 hoops + 4 clubs
Event	1st	2nd	3rd
FIG World Cup	0	0	1
FIG World Challenge Cup	0	0	1
Total	0	0	2

Déborah Medrado Barbosa (born 13 July 2002) is a Brazilian former group rhythmic gymnast. She is the 2021 and 2022 Pan American group all-around champion and the 2019 Pan American Games 3 hoops + 4 clubs champion. She won three gold medals at the 2018 South American Games and at the 2019 South American Championships. Medrado represented Brazil at the 2020 Summer Olympics and at the 2024 Summer Olympics. She announced her retirement in November 2024.

== Career ==
Medrado began rhythmic gymnastics when she was nine and joined the Brazilian senior national group in 2018. At the 2018 South American Games Medrado and her teammates swept the gold medals in the group all-around and both apparatus finals. She competed at the 2018 Pan American Championships where the Brazilian group won the gold medal in 5 balls and the bronze medals in the group all-around and 3 balls + 2 ropes. She was unable to compete at the 2018 World Championships due to a foot injury.

Medrado and the Brazilian group swept the gold medals at the 2019 South American Championships. She then competed at the 2019 Pan American Games where she won a gold medal in the 3 hoops + 2 clubs event and bronze medals in the group all-around and 5 balls event. Then at the 2019 World Championships in Baku, the Brazilian group placed thirteenth in the all-around.

In 2020, Medrado had surgery on both feet because her second metatarsal bones were causing pain.

Medrado competed at the 2021 Pan American Championships in Rio de Janeiro. The group won the gold medal in the group all-around and secured the continental quota place for the 2020 Olympic Games. The group additionally won the gold medals in both the 5 balls and the 3 hoops + 4 clubs event finals. She was then selected to compete for Brazil at the 2020 Summer Olympics in the group all-around alongside Beatriz Linhares, Maria Eduarda Arakaki, Nicole Pírcio, and Geovanna Santos. They finished twelfth in the qualification round for the group all-around. After the Olympic Games, she competed at the 2021 World Championships where the Brazilian group placed ninth in the all-around.

Medrado competed with Maria Eduarda Arakaki, Nicole Pircio, Gabrielle da Silva, Giovanna Oliveira, and Bárbara Galvão at the 2022 Pan American Championships and successfully defended their group all-around title. They also won gold in the 5 hoops event finals, and they won the silver behind Mexico in the 3 ribbons + 2 balls final. The same group then competed at the 2022 World Championships in Sofia where they finished fifth in the group all-around. They also qualified for the 5 hoops final where they finished fourth.

At the 2023 World Championships, Medrado competed as part of the group. She and her teammates finished high enough to win the Brazilian group a quota at the upcoming 2024 Summer Olympics, the first time a group representing Brazil had done so.

In August 2024, Medrado competed at the 2024 Summer Olympics. The Brazilian group finished in ninth place, just outside of reaching the finals, due to group member Victória Borges injuring herself minutes before their second qualifications routine.

Medrado announced her retirement on 27 November 2024 at the opening of the Brazilian national championships, where she performed an exhibition with her teammates.

== Post-gymnastics career ==
Medrado qualified to become a national-level judge. She has also worked as a commentator and choreographer.

She was selected as the gymnastics ambassador of the 2025 World Championships, held in Brazil, in recognition of her gymnastics accomplishments and her continued work in the sport.
