= Nicole Pircio =

Brazilian rhythmic gymnast

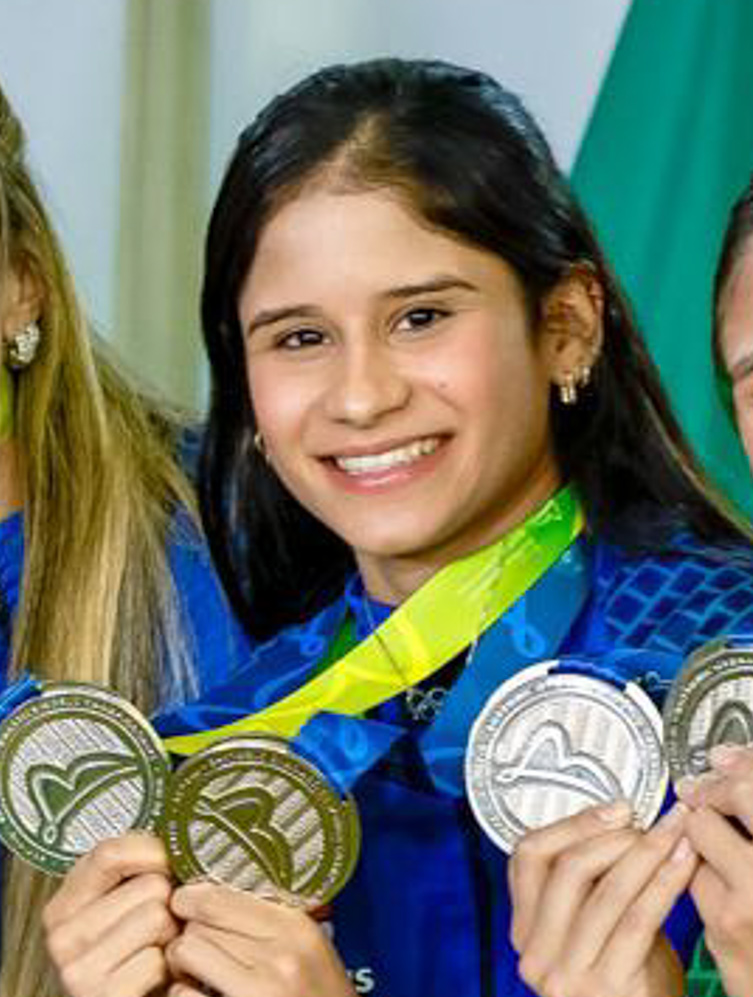
- Pircio in 2025

Personal information
- Full name: Nicole Pircio Nunes Duarte
- Born: 24 July 2002 (age 24) Piracicaba, Brazil
- Height: 166 cm (5 ft 5 in)

Gymnastics career
- Discipline: Rhythmic gymnastics
- Country represented: Brazil; (2018 - present)
- Head coach: Camila Ferezin
Medal record
Rhythmic gymnastics
Representing Brazil
Event	1st	2nd	3rd
FIG World Cup	2	2	4
FIG World Challenge Cup	7	1	1
Total	9	3	5
World Championships
Gold medal – first place	2026 Frankfurt	5 balls
Gold medal – first place	2026 Frankfurt	3 hoops + 4 clubs
Silver medal – second place	2025 Rio de Janeiro	Group all-around
Silver medal – second place	2025 Rio de Janeiro	3 balls + 2 hoops
Bronze medal – third place	2026 Frankfurt	Group all-around
Pan American Games
Gold medal – first place	2019 Lima	3 hoops + 2 clubs
Gold medal – first place	2023 Santiago	Group all-around
Gold medal – first place	2023 Santiago	5 hoops
Gold medal – first place	2023 Santiago	3 ribbons + 2 balls
Bronze medal – third place	2019 Lima	Group all-around
Bronze medal – third place	2019 Lima	5 balls
Pan American Championships
Gold medal – first place	2018 Lima	5 hoops
Gold medal – first place	2021 Rio de Janeiro	Group all-around
Gold medal – first place	2021 Rio de Janeiro	5 balls
Gold medal – first place	2021 Rio de Janeiro	3 hoops + 4 clubs
Gold medal – first place	2022 Rio de Janeiro	Group all-around
Gold medal – first place	2022 Rio de Janeiro	5 hoops
Gold medal – first place	2023 Guadalajara	Group All-around
Gold medal – first place	2023 Guadalajara	5 hoops
Gold medal – first place	2023 Guadalajara	3 ribbons + 2 balls
Gold medal – first place	2024 Guatemala City	5 hoops
Gold medal – first place	2026 Rio de Janeiro	Group All-Around
Gold medal – first place	2026 Rio de Janeiro	5 Balls
Gold medal – first place	2026 Rio de Janeiro	3 Hoops + 4 Clubs
Silver medal – second place	2022 Rio de Janeiro	3 ribbons + 2 balls
Silver medal – second place	2024 Guatemala City	Group all-around
Silver medal – second place	2024 Guatemala City	3 ribbons + 2 balls
Bronze medal – third place	2018 Lima	Group all-around
Bronze medal – third place	2018 Lima	3 balls + 2 ropes
South American Games
Gold medal – first place	2018 Cochabamba	Group all-around
Gold medal – first place	2018 Cochabamba	5 hoops
Gold medal – first place	2018 Cochabamba	3 balls + 2 ropes
Gold medal – first place	2026 Santa Fe	Group All-Around
Gold medal – first place	2026 Santa Fe	5 balls
Gold medal – first place	2026 Santa Fe	3 hoops + 4 clubs
South American Championships
Gold medal – first place	2019 Bogotá	Group all-around
Gold medal – first place	2019 Bogotá	5 balls
Gold medal – first place	2019 Bogotá	3 hoops + 4 clubs
Gold medal – first place	2022 Paipa	All-around team
Gold medal – first place	2022 Paipa	Group all-around
Gold medal – first place	2022 Paipa	5 hoops
Gold medal – first place	2022 Paipa	3 ribbons + 2 balls

Nicole Pircio Nunes Duarte OLY (born 24 July 2002) is a Brazilian rhythmic gymnast. She is a four-time (2021-2023, 2026) Pan American group all-around champion and the 2019 Pan American Games 3 hoops + 4 clubs champion. She won three gold medals at the 2018 South American Games and at the 2019 South American Championships, and she won four gold medals at the 2022 South American Championships. She represented Brazil at the 2020 Summer Olympics and finished twelfth in qualifications for the group all-around.

== Career ==
=== 2018 ===
Pircio began rhythmic gymnastics when she was ten years old and was invited to join the Brazilian national team in 2018. At the 2018 South American Games Pircio and her teammates swept the gold medals in the group all-around and both apparatus finals. She competed at the 2018 Pan American Championships where the Brazilian group won the gold medal in 5 balls and the bronze medals in the group all-around and 3 balls + 2 ropes. She then competed at the 2018 World Championships where the Brazilian group finished eighteenth in the all-around.

=== 2019 ===
Pircio and the Brazilian group swept the gold medals at the 2019 South American Championships. She then competed at the 2019 Pan American Games where she won a gold medal in the 3 hoops + 2 clubs event and bronze medals in the group all-around and 5 balls event. Then at the 2019 World Championships in Baku, the Brazilian group placed thirteenth in the all-around.

=== 2021 ===
Pircio competed at the 2021 Pan American Championships in Rio de Janeiro. The group won the gold medal in the group all-around and secured the continental quota place for the 2020 Olympic Games. The group additionally won the gold medals in both the 5 balls and the 3 hoops + 4 clubs event finals. She was selected to compete for Brazil at the 2020 Summer Olympics in the group all-around alongside Beatriz Linhares, Déborah Medrado, Maria Eduarda Arakaki, and Geovanna Santos. They finished twelfth in the qualification round for the group all-around. After the Olympic Games, she competed at the 2021 World Championships where the Brazilian group placed ninth in the all-around. They also finished seventh in the 5 balls final.

=== 2022 ===
Pircio competed at the 2022 South American Championships where the Brazilian group won the gold medals in the team, all-around, 5 hoops, and 3 ribbons + 2 balls. She then competed with Maria Eduarda Arakaki, Déborah Medrado, Gabrielle da Silva, Giovanna Oliveira, and Bárbara Galvão at the 2022 Pan American Championships and successfully defended their group all-around title. They also won gold in the 5 hoops event finals, and they won the silver behind Mexico in the 3 ribbons + 2 balls final. The same group then competed at the 2022 World Championships in Sofia where they finished fifth in the group all-around. They also qualified for the 5 hoops final where they finished fourth.

=== 2023 ===
Later that year, Piricio represented Brazil at the 2023 World Championships in Valencia, Spain, where she and her teammates finished in 6th place in the group a-around and secured a quota place for the 2024 Olympic Games. They took 4th place in the 5 hoops final and 8th place in the team competition.

=== 2024 ===
On May 10–12, she and her group won gold medal in 3 Ribbons + 2 Balls and silver in group all-around and 5 Hoops at Portimão World Challenge Cup. At the Pan American Championships in Guatemala City, the Brazilian group won the gold medal in 5 hoops but won the silver in the all-around and 3 ribbons and 2 balls behind Mexico. On June 21–23, they competed at Milan World Cup and won silver medals in both group all-around and 5 Hoops. Next month, they won another silver medal in group all-around at Cluj-Napoca World Challenge Cup.

In August 2024, Pircio represented Brazil at the 2024 Summer Olympics alongside Victória Borges, Déborah Medrado, Sofia Pereira, and Maria Eduarda Arakaki. During the qualification round for the group all-around, the Brazilian group stood in fourth place after their first routine, 5 hoops. In the end they finished in ninth place, just outside of reaching the finals, due to group member Victória Borges injuring herself minutes before their second qualifications routine (3 ribbons and 2 balls).

=== 2025 ===
Nicole and Maria Eduarda Arakaki were the only ones left from the Olympic team and continued training in 2025. Together with Maria Paula Caminha, Mariana Vitória Gonçalves, Ana Luiza Franceschi and Bárbara Urquiza they presented new routines at Portimão World Challenge Cup and won gold medals in group all-around, 5 ribbons and 3 balls + 2 hoops. On July 18-20, the group won gold medal in all-around at Milan World Cup. They also won gold medal in 5 Ribbons final and bronze in 3 Balls and 2 Hoops.

In late August, she was selected to represent Brazil alongside Maria Paula Caminha, Mariana Vitória Gonçalves, Sofia Pereira and Maria Eduarda Arakaki at the 2025 World Championships in Rio de Janeiro. They won silver medal in group all-around, 0.3 point behind Japan, being the first Pan-American medal winners of the World Championships. They won another silver medal in 3 balls + 2 hoops and took 6th place in 5 ribbons final.

=== 2026 ===
In April, she and her group competed at Baku World Cup, taking 5th place in all-around. They won silver medal in 5 Balls final. Then they competed at Tashkent World Cup, and ended on 7th place in all-around. They won silver medal in 3 Hoops + 4 Clubs final. On June 5-7, Pircio and her teammates (Maria Paula Caminha, Maria Eduarda Arakaki, Mariana Vitória Gonçalves, Julia Kurunczi, Sofia Pereira) represented Brazil at the 2026 Pan American Championships in Rio de Janeiro, and won three gold medals (Group all-around, 5 Balls, 3 Hoops + 4 Clubs). In July, they competed at Milan World Cup and took gold medal in all-around in front of China and Spain. They also won silver medal in 5 Balls final.

In August, she was part of the group that represented Brazil at the 2026 World Championships in Frankfurt, Germany. They won bronze medal in all-around behind Spain and Japan, and also won an Olympic quota for the 2028 Olympic Games. In team competition they placed 7th alongside Bárbara Domingos, Geovanna Santos and Maria Eduarda Alexandre. They took gold medals in both apparatus finals (5 balls and 3 hoops + 4 clubs). This was the first time any country from Americas won gold medal at Rhythmic Gymnastics World Championships.
