= Lavinia Silvério =

Brazilian rhythmic gymnast

- Full name: Lavinia Rocha Silvério
- Born: 2 May 2009 (age 17) Brazil

Gymnastics career
- Discipline: Rhythmic gymnastics
- Country represented: Brazil (2022-present)
- Head coach: Juliana Coradine
Medal record
Representing Brazil
Rhythmic Gymnastics
Pan American Gymnastics Championships
| Gold medal – first place | 2025 Asunción | Group All-Around |
| Gold medal – first place | 2025 Asunción | 5 Ribbons |
Junior Pan American Championships
| Gold medal – first place | 2022 Rio de Janeiro | Group All-Around |
| Gold medal – first place | 2022 Rio de Janeiro | 5 Ropes |
| Gold medal – first place | 2022 Rio de Janeiro | 5 Balls |
| Gold medal – first place | 2023 Guadalajara | Group All-Around |
| Gold medal – first place | 2023 Guadalajara | 5 Ropes |
| Gold medal – first place | 2023 Guadalajara | 5 Balls |

Lavinia Rocha Silvério (born 2 May 2009) is a Brazilian rhythmic gymnast. She's a multiple Pan American champion as a member of the national junior group.

== Career ==
Lavinia took up the sport at age six after she took part in an exhibition class of rhythmic gymnastics at a local training ground in her neighbourhood.

In March 2022 she was selected for the junior national group along Eloah de Oliveira, Fernanda Heinemann, Isadora Beduschi, Yumi Rodrigues, Laura Gamboa and Nicole Vasques. In July they won gold in the All-Around, with 5 ropes and 5 balls at the Pan American Championships.

The following year she again competed at the Pan American Championships winning all three titles. In July she was selected for the Junior World Championships in Cluj-Napoca, finishing 12th in teams, 6th in the All-Around, 6th with 5ropes and 8th with 5 balls.

In December 2024 she participated in the selection for the new Brazilian senior group. A week later it was revealed she was selected to integrate the group.

In May 2025 it was revealed she was selected for the Pan American Championships in Asunción, along Julia Kurunczi, Keila Santos, Maria Fernanda Moraes, Marianne Giovacchini, Rhayane Vitoria Ferreira Brum.
