= Maria Fernanda Moraes =

Brazilian rhythmic gymnast

- Full name: Maria Fernanda Lucio Moraes
- Born: 17 October 2006 (age 19) Santo Antônio de Pádua

Gymnastics career
- Discipline: Rhythmic gymnastics
- Country represented: Brazil (2022-present)
- Club: Associação Atletica Banco Do Brasil
- Head coach: Camila Ferezin
- Choreographer: Bruna Martins
Medal record
Representing Brazil
Rhythmic Gymnastics
Pan American Gymnastics Championships
Gold medal – first place	2025 Asunción	Group All-Around
Gold medal – first place	2025 Asunción	5 Ribbons
Gold medal – first place	2025 Asunción	3 Balls & 2 Hoops

Maria Fernanda Lucio Moraes (born 17 October 2006) is a Brazilian rhythmic gymnast. She represents Brazil in international competitions as part of the group.

== Career ==
Moraes debuted in August 2022 when she competed at the Brazilian Championships, taking 29th place among seniors. In November she took part in the national group championship being 7th overall, 6th with 3 ribbons & 2 balls and 8th with 5 hoops.

In December 2024 she was confirmed into the Brazilian senior group, of which she was already a reserve. In late May 2025 she was selected for the Pan American Championships in Asunción, along Julia Kurunczi, Keila Santos, Lavinia Silvério, Marianne Giovacchini and Rhayane Ferreira. There she won gold in the All-Around, with 5 ribbons and with 3 balls & 2 hoops.
