= Sofia Pereira (gymnast) =

Brazilian rhythmic gymnast (born 2003)

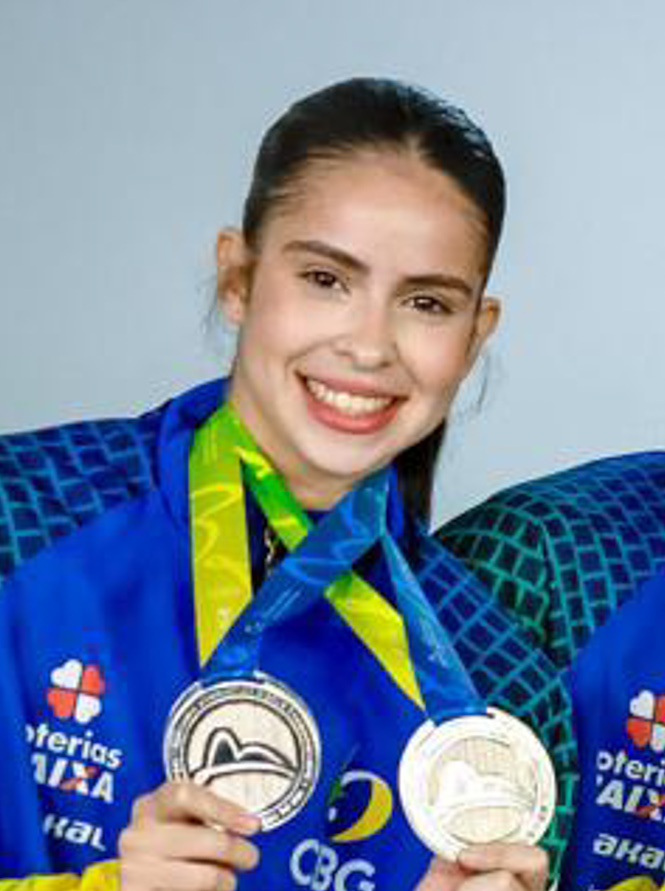
- Pereira in 2025

Personal information
- Full name: Sofia Madeira Pereira
- Nickname: Sofi
- Born: September 15, 2003 (age 23) Brazil

Gymnastics career
- Discipline: Rhythmic gymnastics
- Country represented: Brazil; (2020–)
- Head coach: Camila Ferezin
- Choreographer: Bruna Martins
Medal record
Rhythmic gymnastics
Representing Brazil
Event	1st	2nd	3rd
FIG World Cup	3	4	2
FIG World Challenge Cup	2	4	1
Total	5	8	3
World Championships
Gold medal – first place	2026 Frankfurt	5 balls
Gold medal – first place	2026 Frankfurt	3 hoops + 4 clubs
Silver medal – second place	2025 Rio de Janeiro	Group all-around
Silver medal – second place	2025 Rio de Janeiro	3 balls + 2 hoops
Bronze medal – third place	2026 Frankfurt	Group all-around
Pan American Championships
Gold medal – first place	2023 Guadalajara	Group all-around
Gold medal – first place	2023 Guadalajara	5 hoops
Gold medal – first place	2023 Guadalajara	3 ribbons + 2 balls
Gold medal – first place	2024 Guatemala City	5 hoops
Gold medal – first place	2026 Rio de Janeiro	Group all-around
Gold medal – first place	2026 Rio de Janeiro	5 balls
Gold medal – first place	2026 Rio de Janeiro	3 hoops + 4 clubs
Silver medal – second place	2024 Guatemala City	Group all-around
Silver medal – second place	2024 Guatemala City	3 ribbons + 2 balls
South American Games
Gold medal – first place	2022 Asunción	Group all-around
Gold medal – first place	2022 Asunción	5 hoops
Gold medal – first place	2022 Asunción	3 ribbons + 2 balls
Gold medal – first place	2026 Santa Fe	Group All-Around
Gold medal – first place	2026 Santa Fe	5 Balls
Gold medal – first place	2026 Santa Fe	3 Hoops + 4 Clubs
South American Championships
Gold medal – first place	2022 Paipa	Team (Combined)
Gold medal – first place	2022 Paipa	Group all-around
Gold medal – first place	2022 Paipa	5 hoops
Gold medal – first place	2022 Paipa	3 ribbons + 2 balls

Sofia Madeira Pereira (born 15 September 2003) is a Brazilian rhythmic gymnast, and a member of the national group. She is the 2025 World group all-around silver medalist and represented 2024 Summer Olympics in the group all-around.

== Career ==
Pereira took up the sport at age 9 in the Italo Brasileiro club. At the 2016 national championships, she was 15th in the All-Around and 7th in teams.

In November 2018, she was selected by Camila Ferezin, the national group's coach, along five other gymnasts for an evaluation period to become part of the group. In April 2020, she was again selected for a virtual training with the senior group, and again in January 2022. In late 2022, she become a starter in the group, competing at the South American Championships where Brazil won all the gold medals.

=== 2023 ===
At the start of the 2023 season, she competed at the World Cup in Athens, Brazil won bronze in the All-Around and took 8th place with 5 hoops. In Sofia, the group was 7th in the All-Around, 6th with 5 hoops and 4th with 3 ribbons and 2 balls. In May, she took part in the World Cup in Portimão, the group was 8th in the All-Around and then won an historical gold medal in the 5 hoops final, the first for Brazil. In June, she was selected for the Pan American Championships, where the group won gold in all three events. On July 14–16, they competed at Cluj-Napoca World Challenge Cup and won bronze medal in all-around. They also won gold in 3 Ribbons + 2 Balls and silver in 5 Hoops final. Later that year, she represented Brazil at the 2023 World Championships in Valencia, Spain, where she and her teammates finished on 6th place in Group All-around and secured a quota place for the 2024 Olympic Games. They took 4th place in 5 Hoops final and 8th place in team competition.

=== 2024 ===
On May 10–12, she and her group won gold medal in 3 Ribbons + 2 Balls and silver in group all-around and 5 Hoops at Portimão World Challenge Cup. At the Pan American Championships in Guatemala City, the Brazilian group won the gold medal in 5 hoops but won the silver in the all-around and 3 ribbons and 2 balls behind Mexico. On June 21–23, they competed at Milan World Cup and won silver medals in both group all-around and 5 Hoops. Next month, they won another silver medal in group all-around at Cluj-Napoca World Challenge Cup.

In August 2024, Medrado competed represented Brazil at the 2024 Summer Olympics alongside Victória Borges, Déborah Medrado, Maria Eduarda Arakaki, and Nicole Pircio. During the qualification round for the group all-around, the Brazilian group stood in fourth place after their first routine, 5 hoops. In the end they finished in ninth place, just outside of reaching the finals, due to group member Victória Borges injuring herself minutes before their second qualifications routine (3 ribbons and 2 balls).

=== 2025 ===
On July 18-20, the group won gold medal in all-around at Milan World Cup. They also won gold medal in 5 Ribbons final and bronze in 3 Balls and 2 Hoops. In late August, she was selected to represent Brazil alongside Maria Paula Caminha, Mariana Vitória Gonçalves, Maria Eduarda Arakaki and Nicole Pircio at the 2025 World Championships in Rio de Janeiro. They won silver medal in group all-around, 0.3 point behind Japan, being the first Pan-American medal winners of the World Championships. They won another silver medal in 3 balls + 2 hoops and took 6th place in 5 ribbons final.

=== 2026 ===
In April, she and her group competed at Baku World Cup, taking 5th place in all-around. They won silver medal in 5 Balls final. Then they competed at Tashkent World Cup, and ended on 7th place in all-around. They won silver medal in 3 Hoops + 4 Clubs final. On June 5-7, Pereira and her teammates (Maria Paula Caminha, Maria Eduarda Arakaki, Mariana Vitória Gonçalves, Julia Kurunczi, Nicole Pircio) represented Brazil at the 2026 Pan American Championships in Rio de Janeiro, and won three gold medals (Group all-around, 5 Balls, 3 Hoops + 4 Clubs). In July, they competed at Milan World Cup and took gold medal in all-around in front of China and Spain. They also won silver medal in 5 Balls final.
