= Beatriz Linhares =

Brazilian rhythmic gymnast

- Full name: Beatriz Linhares da Silva
- Nickname: Bia
- Born: 4 February 2003 (age 23) Florianópolis, Santa Catarina, Brazil
- Height: 1.58 m (5 ft 2 in)

Gymnastics career
- Discipline: Rhythmic gymnastics
- Country represented: Brazil (2019 - present)
- Head coach: Camila Ferezin
Medal record
Rhythmic gymnastics
Representing Brazil
Event	1st	2nd	3rd
FIG World Cup	0	0	1
Total	0	0	1
Pan American Games
Gold medal – first place	2019 Lima	3 hoops + 4 clubs
Bronze medal – third place	2019 Lima	Group all-around
Bronze medal – third place	2019 Lima	5 balls
Pan American Championships
Gold medal – first place	2021 Rio de Janeiro	Group all-around
Gold medal – first place	2021 Rio de Janeiro	5 balls
Gold medal – first place	2021 Rio de Janeiro	3 hoops + 4 clubs
South American Games
Gold medal – first place	2022 Asunción	Group all-around
Gold medal – first place	2022 Asunción	5 hoops
Gold medal – first place	2022 Asunción	3 ribbons + 2 balls

Beatriz Linhares da Silva (born 4 February 2003) is a Brazilian rhythmic gymnast. She represented Brazil at the 2020 Summer Olympics in the group all-around.

== Career ==
Linhares grew up training in ballet, but she switched to rhythmic gymnastics when she was nine years old. In 2017, she moved away from her family to Aracaju so she could train with the Brazilian group.

Linhares represented Brazil at the 2019 Pan American Games, and the Brazilian group won the bronze medal in the group all-around behind Mexico and the United States. They also won the bronze medal in the 5 balls event final. Then in the 3 hoops + 4 clubs, they won the gold medal.

Linhares competed at the 2021 Pan American Championships in Rio de Janeiro. The group won the gold medal in the group all-around and secured the continental quota place for the 2020 Olympic Games. The group additionally won the gold medals in both the 5 balls and the 3 hoops + 4 clubs event finals.

She was selected to compete for Brazil at the 2020 Summer Olympics in the group all-around alongside Maria Eduarda Arakaki, Déborah Medrado, Nicole Pírcio, and Geovanna Santos. They finished twelfth in the qualification round for the group all-around.
