= Geovanna Santos =

Brazilian rhythmic gymnast

- Full name: Geovanna Santos da Silva
- Nickname: Jojô
- Born: 15 February 2002 (age 24) Pinheiros, Espírito Santo, Brazil
- Height: 1.56 m (5 ft 1 in)

Gymnastics career
- Discipline: Rhythmic gymnastics
- Country represented: Brazil
- Club: Clube Italo Brasileiro
- Head coaches: Gizela Batista (individual), Camila Ferezin (group)
Medal record
Rhythmic gymnastics
Representing Brazil
Event	1st	2nd	3rd
Pan American Games	0	1	0
Pan American Championships	10	6	1
South American Games	2	5	1
South American Championships	4	1	1
Grand Prix	0	1	1
FIG World Cup	0	0	1
Total	16	14	5
Pan American Games
Silver medal – second place	2023 Santiago	Ball
Pan American Championships
Gold medal – first place	2021 Rio de Janeiro	Group all-around
Gold medal – first place	2021 Rio de Janeiro	5 balls
Gold medal – first place	2021 Rio de Janeiro	3 hoops + 4 clubs
Gold medal – first place	2022 Rio de Janeiro	Clubs
Gold medal – first place	2022 Rio de Janeiro	Ribbon
Gold medal – first place	2023 Guadalajara	Team
Gold medal – first place	2023 Guadalajara	Hoop
Gold medal – first place	2024 Guatemala City	Team
Gold medal – first place	2026 Rio de Janeiro	Team
Gold medal – first place	2026 Rio de Janeiro	Hoop
Silver medal – second place	2022 Rio de Janeiro	Team
Silver medal – second place	2022 Rio de Janeiro	All-around
Silver medal – second place	2023 Guadalajara	All-around
Silver medal – second place	2023 Guadalajara	Ball
Silver medal – second place	2023 Guadalajara	Ribbon
Silver medal – second place	2024 Guatemala City	Hoop
Silver medal – second place	2025 Asunción	Team
Silver medal – second place	2025 Asunción	Hoop
Bronze medal – third place	2023 Guadalajara	Clubs
Bronze medal – third place	2025 Asunción	All-Around
South American Games
Gold medal – first place	2022 Asunción	Hoop
Gold medal – first place	2026 Santa Fe	Clubs
Silver medal – second place	2022 Asunción	All-around
Silver medal – second place	2022 Asunción	Ball
Silver medal – second place	2022 Asunción	Ribbon
Silver medal – second place	2026 Santa Fe	All-Around
Silver medal – second place	2026 Santa Fe	Hoop
Bronze medal – third place	2022 Asunción	Clubs
South American Championships
Gold medal – first place	2022 Paipa	Team
Gold medal – first place	2022 Paipa	All-around team
Gold medal – first place	2022 Paipa	Hoop
Gold medal – first place	2022 Paipa	Ribbon
Silver medal – second place	2022 Paipa	All-around
Bronze medal – third place	2022 Paipa	Clubs

Geovanna Santos da Silva (born 15 February 2002) is a Brazilian rhythmic gymnast who has competed both as an individual and a group member. She represented Brazil at the 2020 Summer Olympics in the group all-around.

== Career ==
Santos began rhythmic gymnastics when she was six years old in Pinheiros. Her father left his job so the family could move to another city for her to train, and her brother stopped his own sport, badminton, to become a rhythmic gymnastics judge to help evaluate her routines.

=== 2021 ===
She began competing with Brazil's senior rhythmic group in 2021. Santos competed at the 2021 Pan American Championships in Rio de Janeiro. The group won the gold medal in the group all-around and secured the continental quota place for the 2020 Olympic Games. The group additionally won the gold medals in both the 5 balls and the 3 hoops + 4 clubs event finals.

She was selected to compete for Brazil at the 2020 Summer Olympics in the group all-around alongside Maria Eduarda Arakaki, Déborah Medrado, Nicole Pírcio, and Beatriz Linhares. Santos ruptured a ligament in her knee ahead of the Olympics, but she recovered in time to compete. They finished twelfth in the qualification round for the group all-around.

After the Olympics, Santos resumed competing as an individual, saying that she had achieved her goal as a group member. She also said that she wanted to be the first gymnast to compete at the Olympics as both a group member and individual gymnast.

=== 2022 ===
As individual Santos participated in World Cups, such as Pesaro 2022. She competed at the 2022 Pan American Gymnastics Championship in Rio de Janeiro, Brazil, winning silver in the team competition as well as the all-around. Her ribbon routine, with which she won gold, went viral. The routine was performed to the song Rajadão by Pabllo Vittar, who commented positively on a video of her routine. Santos expressed joy about the comment and also said, "I want to continue taking the LGBTQIA+ community to the top, rising higher and higher, and giving voice to the cause. I am very happy for the affection they have given me."

On September 14–18 she represented Brazil alongside Bárbara Domingos at the 2022 World Championships in Sofia, Bulgaria. She ended on 23rd place in all-around qualifications. In October she competed at the 2022 South American Games in Asunción, Paraguay. She won gold medal in hoop, and silver medals in all-around, ball and ribbon, and bronze in clubs. In late November, she won team, hoop and ribbon gold medals at the 2022 South American Championships in Paipa, Colombia. In addition, she won bronze medal in clubs.

=== 2023 ===
Santos started the season in March, competing at World Cup Palaio Faliro. She was 21st in all-around. In May, she competed at World Challenge Cup in Portimao, and ended on 13th place in all-around. She qualified to ribbon final, finishing 6th.

In August, she was selected to represent Brazil at the 2023 World Championships in Valencia, and took 21st place in all-around qualifications. She was 8th in team competition with senior group and teammate Bárbara Domingos.

=== 2024 ===
She competed at the 2024 Pan American Championship in Guatemala City, Guatemala, and wong gold medal in team event and silver in hoop final. In September 2024, she became the national silver medalist behind Maria Eduarda Alexandre and ahead of Ana Luísa Neiva.

=== 2025 ===
In 2025, she began her season at the World Cup in Sofia, where she placed 10th overall. At the Pan American Championships, she won bronze in the all-around, as well as silver in the team competition. In the apparatus finals, she won another silver with hoop and a second bronze with clubs. In June, she won silver medal in all-around behind Domingos at Brazilian National Championships. On July 25-27, she competed at the Cluj-Napoca World Challenge Cup and finished 10th in the all-around. She took 6th place in clubs and 7th in ribbon final.

In August, she represented Brazil at the 2025 World Championships in front of her home crowd. She took 13th place in all-around qualifications and advance into all-around final, where she made a huge mistake in ribbon routine and finished on 18th place.

=== 2026 ===
Santos started her 2026 season competing at Tartu Grand Prix, where she placed 6th in the all-around. In addition, she won bronze in hoop and silver in ball final. In April, she won her first World Cup medal (bronze) in ribbon final at Tashkent World Cup.

== Routine music information ==
Year	Apparatus	Music title
2026	Hoop	Ambition (No Choir Mix)-15297 by Really Slow Motion & Giant Apes
2026	Ball	
2026	Clubs	The Cad-15297 by Unchained
2026	Ribbon	Gaston (from Beauty and the Beast) by Josh Gad, Luke Evans; Be Our Guest (from Beauty and the Beast) by Alan Menken, Howard Ashman
2025	Hoop	
2025	Ball	My Heart Will Go On (Love Theme from Titanic) by Céline Dion
2025	Clubs	The Cad-15297 by Unchained
2025	Ribbon	Tudo bom by Static & Ben El
2023	Hoop	Obsidian by Audiomachine
2023	Ball	All By Myself by Celine Dion
2023	Clubs	Stanga by Sagi Abitbul & Guy Haliva
2023	Ribbon	Rajadão (Ao Vivo) by Pabllo Vittar
2022	Hoop	Obsidian by Audiomachine
2022	Ball	Il Mondo by Il Volo
2022	Clubs	Stanga by Sagi Abitbul & Guy Haliva
2022	Ribbon	Rajadão by Pabllo Vittar
