= Victória Borges =

Brazilian rhythmic gymnast (born 2002)

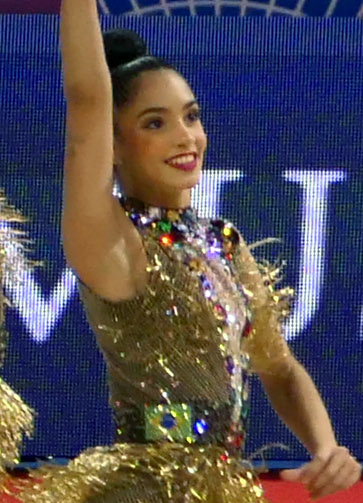
- Borges at the 2024 Sofia World Cup

Personal information
- Nickname: Vic
- Born: 13 July 2002 (age 24) Aracaju, Brazil

Gymnastics career
- Discipline: Rhythmic gymnastics
- Country represented: Brazil; (2018 – 2024)
- Club: Club Sportivo Sergipe
- Head coach: Camila Ferezin
- Choreographer: Bruna Martins
Medal record
Representing Brazil
Rhythmic Gymnastics
Event	1st	2nd	3rd
FIG World Cup	0	0	1
FIG World Challenge Cup	2	1	1
Total	2	1	2
Pan American Games
Gold medal – first place	2023 Santiago	Group all-around
Gold medal – first place	2023 Santiago	5 Hoops
Gold medal – first place	2023 Santiago	3 Ribbons + 2 Balls
Pan American Championships
Gold medal – first place	2024 Guatemala City	5 Hoops
Silver medal – second place	2024 Guatemala City	Group all-around
Silver medal – second place	2024 Guatemala City	3 Ribbons + 2 Balls
South American Championships
Gold medal – first place	2022 Paipa	Team
Gold medal – first place	2022 Paipa	Group all-around
Gold medal – first place	2022 Paipa	5 Hoops
Gold medal – first place	2022 Paipa	3 Ribbons + 2 Balls
Gold medal – first place	2023 Barranquilla	Team
Gold medal – first place	2023 Barranquilla	Group all-around
Gold medal – first place	2023 Barranquilla	5 Hoops
Gold medal – first place	2023 Barranquilla	3 Ribbons + 2 Balls
Gold medal – first place	2026 Asuncion	Group all-around
Gold medal – first place	2026 Asunción	5 Balls
Gold medal – first place	2026 Asunción	3 Hoops + 4 Clubs
Gold medal – first place	2026 Asunción	All-Around Team

Victória Borges (born 13 July 2002) is a Brazilian rhythmic gymnast. As a member of the senior national group, she won three gold medals at the 2023 Pan American Games, three medals at the 2024 Pan American Championships, and eight gold medals at the South American Championships. She represented Brazil at the 2024 Summer Olympics but was injured during the qualification round for the group all-around.

== Career ==
=== 2017–19 ===
Borges began rhythmic gymnastics in her hometown, Aracaju, and was invited to join the national team in 2017. She joined the senior national group in 2019. She competed at the 2019 Guadalajara World Challenge Cup where Brazil finished seventh in the all-around, eighth in 5 balls, and seventh in 2 hoops and 3 clubs.

=== 2021–22 ===
After training in Portugal in 2020 due to the COVID-19 pandemic in Brazil, in 2021, she was selected to compete at the World Cups in Baku and Tashkent. However, Brazil withdrew from the Tashkent World Cup due to COVID-19 cases within the group, and Borges was replaced for the World Cup in Baku.

Borges competed at the 2022 South American Games in Asunción, where the Brazilian group swept the gold medals. Then at the South American Championships, Brazil swept the group gold medals and also won a team gold medal alongside the individual gymnasts.

=== 2023 ===
Borges helped Brazil win its first FIG World Cup group all-around medal, a bronze, at the 2023 Athens World Cup. Then at the Sofia World Cup, the group finished seventh in the all-around, fifth in 5 hoops, and fourth in 3 ribbons and 2 balls. At the Portimão World Challenge Cup, she was part of the group that won a historic gold medal in the 5 hoops final. Then at the World Challenge Cup in Cluj-Napoca, they won the gold medal in 3 ribbons and 2 balls, the silver medal in 5 hoops, and the bronze medal in the all-around. At the final World Cup stage in Milan, the group finished ninth in the all-around and fifth in 3 ribbons and 2 balls.

Borges competed at the South American Championships in Barranquilla, where Brazil swept the group gold medals and also won a team gold medal alongside the individual gymnasts. She then helped the Brazilian group sweep the gold medals at the 2023 Pan American Games.

=== 2024 ===
Borges competed with Brazil at the 2024 Sofia World Cup, where the group finished fifth in the all-around. At the Pan American Championships in Guatemala City, the Brazilian group won the gold medal in 5 hoops but won the silver in the all-around and 3 ribbons and 2 balls behind Mexico.

Borges represented Brazil at the 2024 Summer Olympics alongside Maria Eduarda Arakaki, Déborah Medrado, Sofia Pereira, and Nicole Pircio. During the qualification round for the group all-around, the Brazilian team sat in fourth place after their first routine, 5 hoops. However, minutes before the 3 ribbons and 2 balls routine, Borges injured her left calf. Because rhythmic gymnastics does not allow substitute athletes at the Olympic Games, Borges competed despite the injury. She was not able to complete all of the elements in the routine. The group ultimately finished in ninth place, making them the first reserves for the group all-around final. The injury was later discovered to be a partially torn Achilles tendon, and Borges had surgery upon her return to Brazil.

=== 2026 ===
After a long almost two-year recovery, Borges has returned to international competitions as part of national reserve group. In June, she and her teammates (Bárbara Galvão, Maria Moraes, Rhayane Ferreira, Andriely Cichovicz, Marianne Giovacchini) competed at the 2026 South American Championships in Asunción, Paraguay. They won gold medal in all-around competition.
