= 2017 South American Rhythmic Gymnastics Championships =

International rhythmic gymnastics competition

The 2017 South American Rhythmic Gymnastics Championships were held in Cochabamba, Bolivia, September 27–29, 2017. The competition was organized by the Bolivian Gymnastics Federation and approved by the International Gymnastics Federation.

== Participating nations ==
- Argentina
- Bolivia
- Brazil
- Chile
- Colombia

== Medal summary ==
Event	Gold	Silver	Bronze
Team all-around	Brazil; Natália Gaudio; Mariany Miyamoto; Karine Walter	Colombia; Lina Dussan; Isabella Arevalo; Mariana Sanchez	Chile; Javiera Rubilar; Montserrat Urrutia; Maria José Silva; Fernanda Labra
Individual all-around	Natália Gaudio (BRA)	Mariany Miyamoto (BRA)	Lina Dussan (COL)
Hoop	Lina Dussan (COL)	Mariany Miyamoto (BRA)	Natália Gaudio (BRA)
Ball	Natália Gaudio (BRA)	Lina Dussan (COL)	Mariany Miyamoto (BRA)
Clubs	Natália Gaudio (BRA)	Lina Dussan (COL)	Karine Walter (BRA)
Ribbon	Natália Gaudio (BRA)	Mariany Miyamoto (BRA)	Javiera Rubilar (CHI)
Group all-around	Brazil; Jessica Maier; Francielly Pereira; Gabrielle Moraes; Heloisa Bornal; Alanis Avila; Marine Vieira	Chile; Antonia Muñoz; Valentina Castro; Valentina Aguirre; Rocio Caibul; Antonia Badilla; Catalina Villavicencio	Argentina; Lucia Acosta; Guadalupe Gonzalez; Candela Alvarez; Guadalupe de la Torre; Ana Gaitan
Group 5 hoops	Brazil; Jessica Maier; Francielly Pereira; Gabrielle Moraes; Heloisa Bornal; Alanis Avila; Marine Vieira	Chile; Antonia Muñoz; Valentina Castro; Valentina Aguirre; Rocio Caibul; Antonia Badilla; Catalina Villavicencio	Argentina; Lucia Acosta; Guadalupe Gonzalez; Candela Alvarez; Guadalupe de la Torre; Ana Gaitan
Group 3 balls and 2 ropes	Brazil; Jessica Maier; Francielly Pereira; Gabrielle Moraes; Heloisa Bornal; Alanis Avila; Marine Vieira	Chile; Antonia Muñoz; Valentina Castro; Valentina Aguirre; Rocio Caibul; Antonia Badilla; Catalina Villavicencio	Argentina; Lucia Acosta; Guadalupe Gonzalez; Candela Alvarez; Guadalupe de la Torre; Ana Gaitan

=== Medal table ===
Rank	Nation	Gold	Silver	Bronze	Total
1	Brazil (BRA)	8	3	3	14
2	Colombia (COL)	1	3	1	5
3	Chile (CHI)	0	3	2	5
4	Argentina (ARG)	0	0	3	3
Totals (4 entries)		9	9	9	27
