= Gordon Rice =

Canadian artist (born 1933)

Gordon Allen Rice (born 1933) is a Canadian artist.

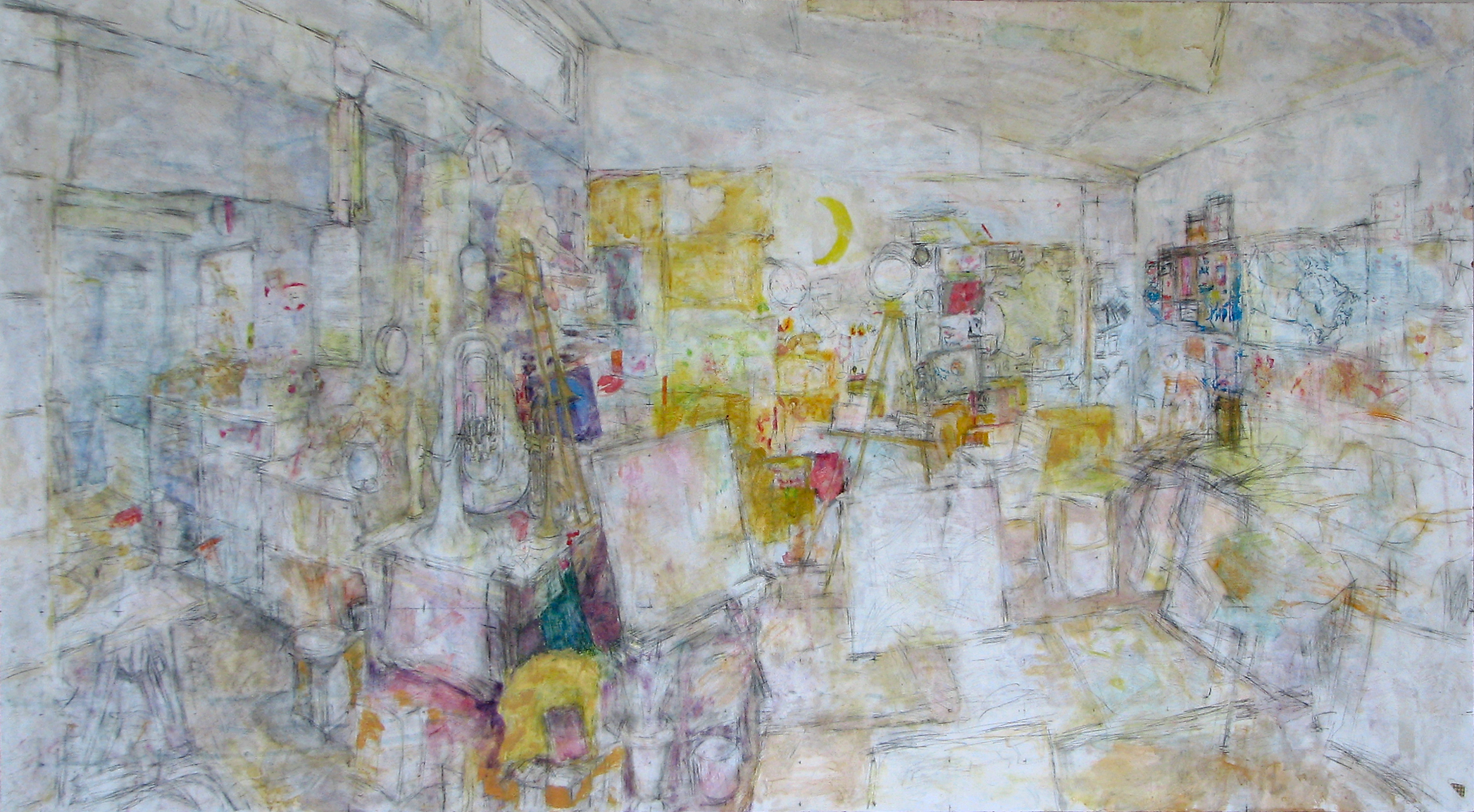
Studio Panorama #3: Oil Painting by Gordon Rice

== Biography, education ==
Gordon Rice was born on 27 September 1933 in Los Angeles, California and educated at Los Angeles City College, University of California, Berkeley, University of California, Los Angeles, and the University of Hawaiʻi (Master of Fine Arts). He exhibited in Los Angeles and Hawaii 1961-1968. Rice is a Canadian citizen who emigrated to Canada in 1968, and has lived and shown in Victoria, British Columbia, Nakusp, Vancouver, and currently White Rock, British Columbia. He has maintained his associations with Los Angeles area artists, and has been notably an associate of Chicano artists Roberto Chavez, Marcus Villagran, and Roberto Gutiérrez. He has shown in Vancouver with his close California friend, Robert Ross, at the Pender Street Gallery in 1977. Rice and Ross exchange collage materials by mail continuously. In recent years Rice has shown mainly in various commercial galleries or at private shows in Vancouver. From 1977 through the 1990s Rice was active as an assistant curator with the Surrey Art Gallery, Surrey, British Columbia and also as a painting instructor at numerous community colleges and the Emily Carr College extension program. His teaching activity carried beyond, into the 2000s.

== Work ==
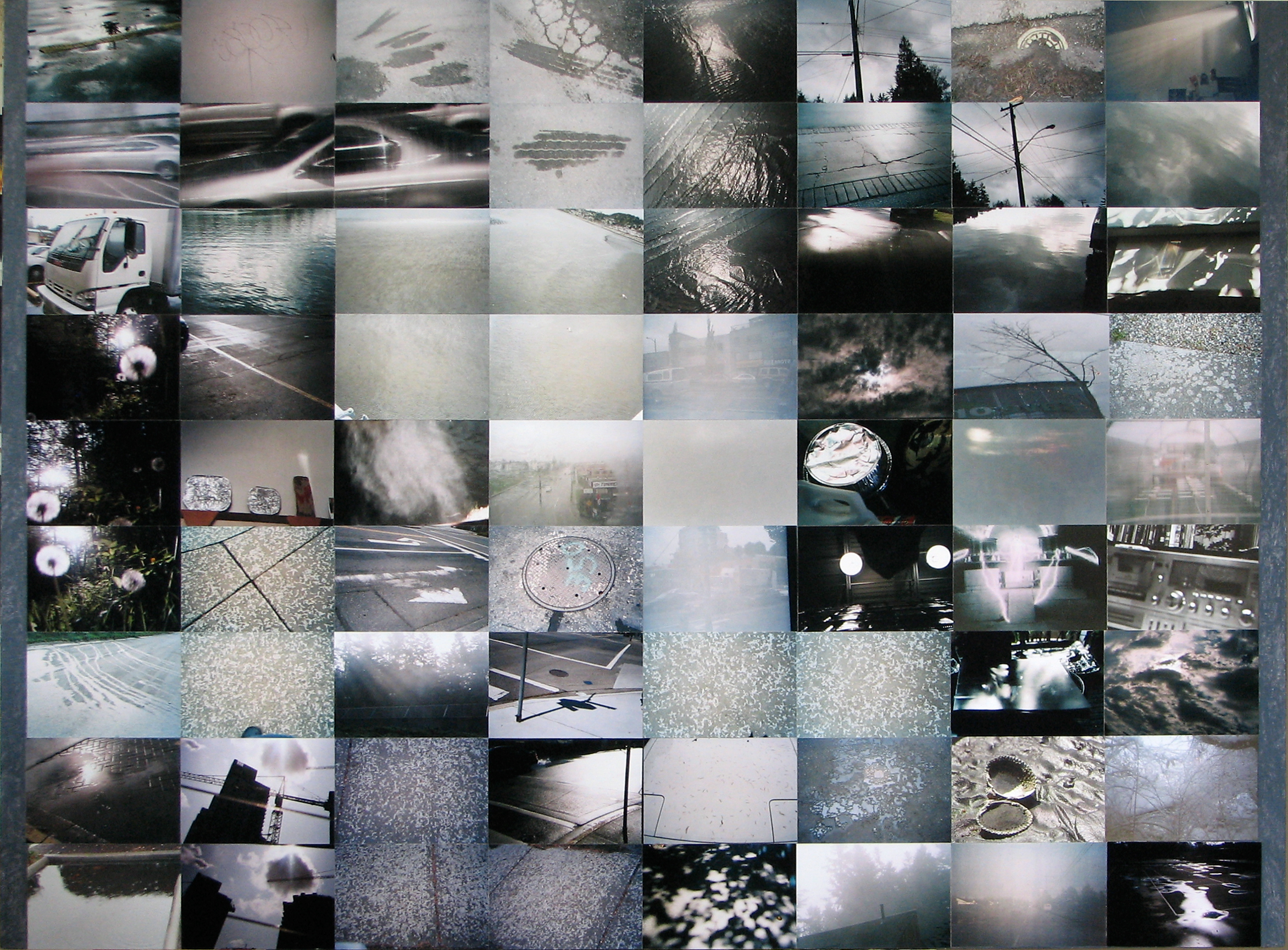
Silver Landscape: Photocollage by Gordon Rice

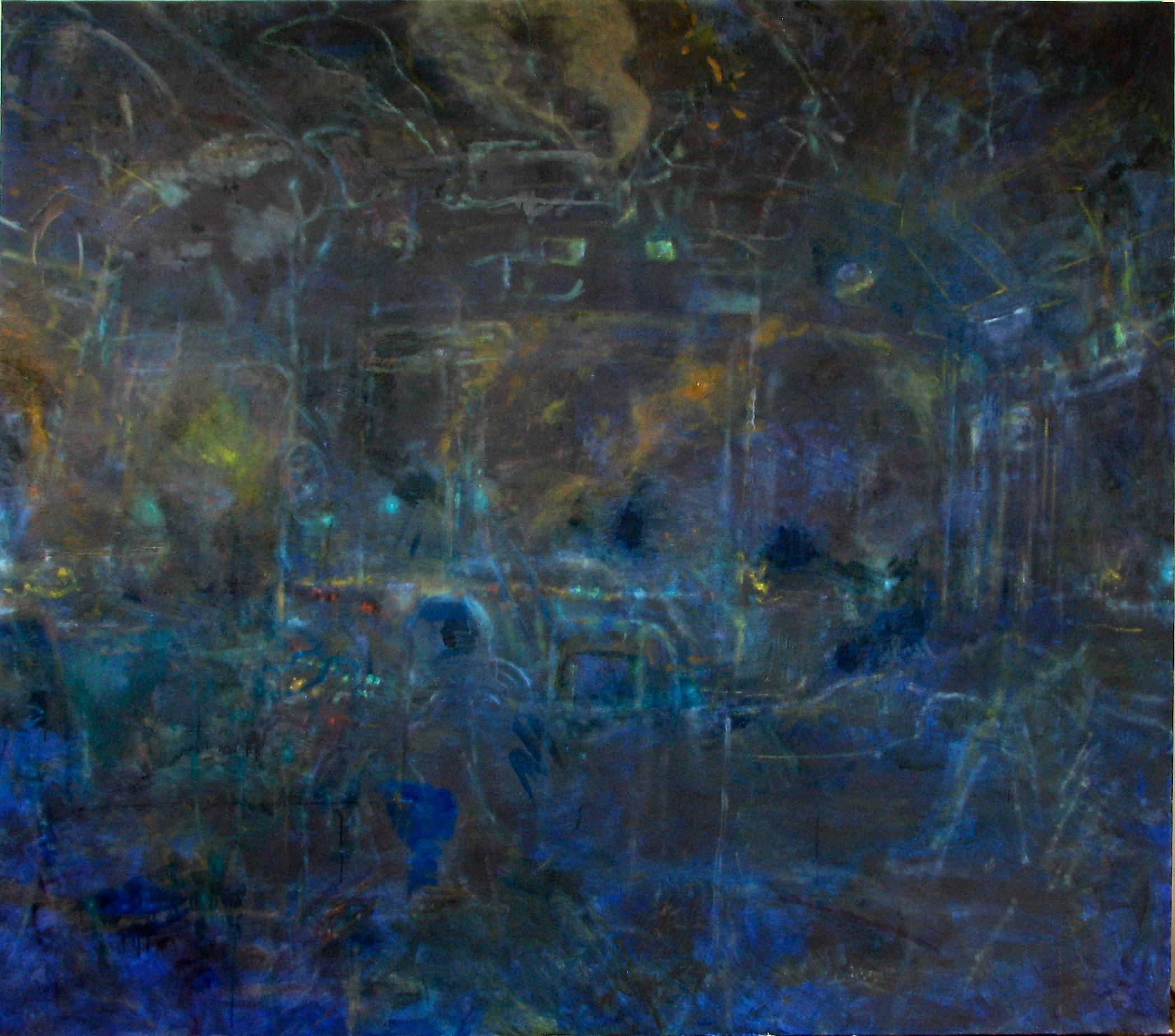
Night Bus: Oil Painting by Gordon Rice

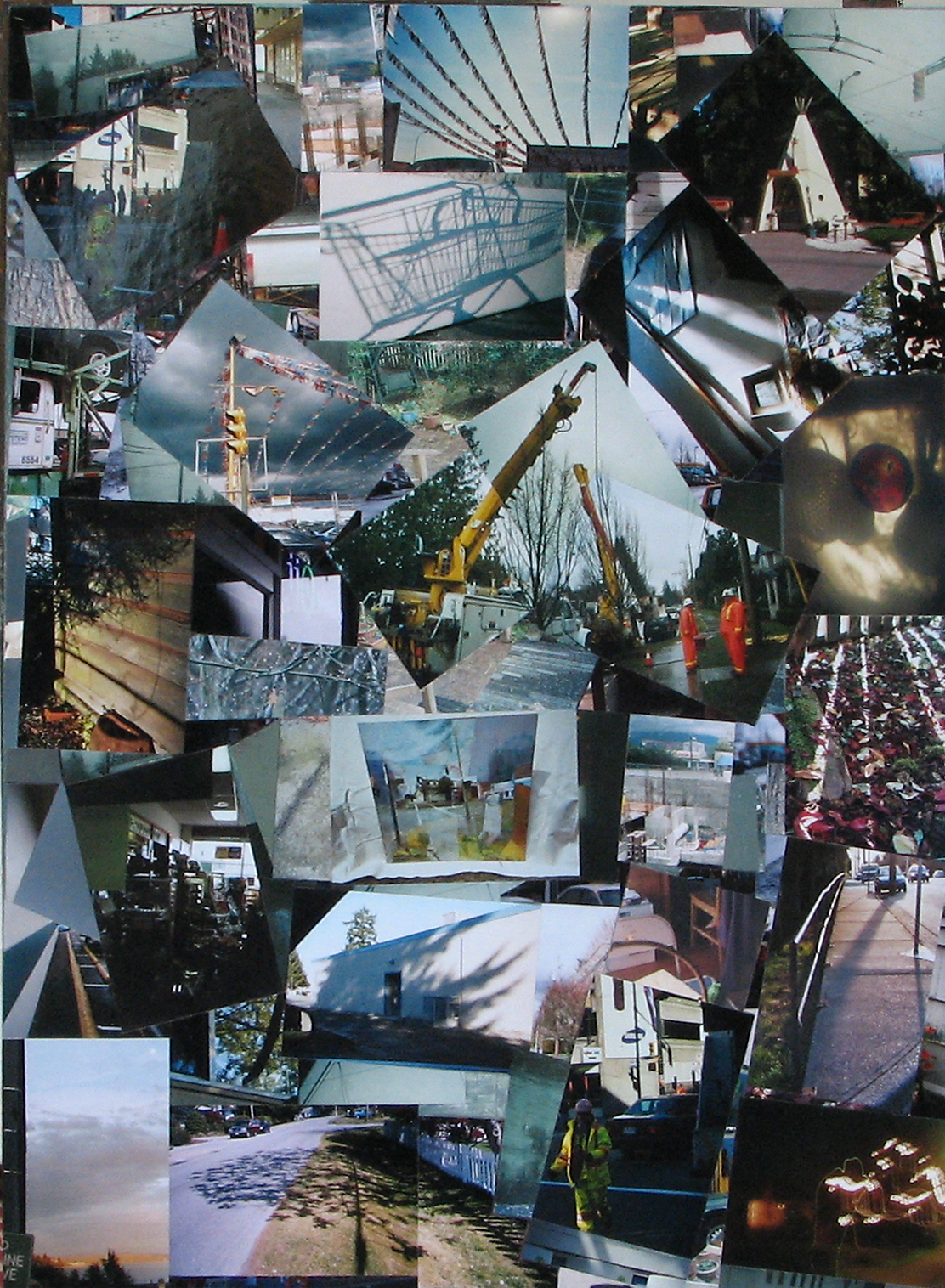
Wrenched Perspective: Photocollage by Gordon Rice

Through all this time, Gordon Rice has made and continues to make work in these formats: large oil paintings (one of which is in the collection of the Vancouver Art Gallery and another in the collection of the Honolulu Museum of Art), large scale collages, many incorporating photographs; and small or very small collages on paper, watercolours, and drawings. Many of these works are in private collections; one piece on public view is the large oil Corner Still Life in the collection of Fairmont Hotels, hanging in the lobby of the Fairmont Chateau Whistler in Whistler, BC

Rice's work reveals his interest in classical drawing and painting, but also in abstraction and media/surface play, with Asian influences and allusions. Many diverse themes can be found in Rice's work: observation of suburban life; significant themes emerging from mundane materials and subjects; Asian and Pacific Rim influences on North American culture; cluttered interiors and still lifes; human figures in everyday settings (including portraits of his wife Ester); gardens and plants, art films, movies, music, astronomy, literary or philosophical texts, cars and industrial sites/equipment; themes common to the hipster movement of the 1950s and 1960s such as Buddhism, Americana and Canadiana; abstract visual relationships, especially those generated by camera optics or distortions of light and reflections; children's art (including collaged elements from his own daughters and grandchildren); advertising, kitsch, and even camp, especially in elements (labels, advertisements, etc.) which evoke an ironic appreciation of the populist expressiveness of "debased" sentimental, ethnic or commercial material. In the 21st century, the predominant work has been large oil paintings with complex surfaces and evocations of luminosity, and medium-sized collages interpolating photographs, often in large numbers.

The rate of Rice's output has remained consistent from the 1960s to the present (2010), including this use of photographs. The interest in photography pre-dates the rise of the Vancouver School of Photoconceptualism, which Rice took notice of without entering into a particular dialogue with it in his work. Commenting on a tendency to remain aloof from art world trends, Curator and first director of the Charles H. Scott Gallery, Ted Lindberg was already writing in 1974 that "Rice has brought ... to Nakusp fragments of ... the peculiarly Pacific world...," and that "he has an almost panoramic knowledge of the interactions and/or disparities between western European art and several hundred other cultures and subcultures.... This is perhaps why he doesn't worry too much about current vogues."

This or similar ideas appeared in an article Lindberg wrote for Vanguard magazine in 1974, according to a summary entry in the book Art and Architecture in Canada, citing "Gordon Rice's ... interest in manual skill and the Topographical tradition... contrasted with his lack of interest in contemporary art trends."

Curator Greg Bellerby has made the following assessment: "In all his work, he imparts a sense of inquiry and delight with the ordinary life around us."

== Bibliography ==
- Balkind, Alvin (1977), From This Point of View: 60 British Columbia Painters, Sculptors, Photographers, Graphic and Video Artists, September 7-October 2, 1977, Vancouver Art Gallery
- Bellerby, Greg (1984), Gordon Rice works on paper : Art Gallery of Greater Victoria, May 3 to June 3, 1984, Art Gallery of Greater Victoria, ISBN 978-0-88885-091-1
- Gordon Rice: The Art Gallery of Greater Victoria, May 27 to June 15, 1969, Art Gallery of Greater Victoria, 1969
- Lindberg, Ted (1974), Gordon Rice: Catalogue of an exhibition held at the Vancouver Art Gallery, 17 Apr.-12 May 1974, Vancouver: Vancouver Art Gallery Introduction by Ted Lindberg.
- Lindberg, Ted (1974), Gordon Rice (Article in Vanguard Magazine 3 No. 3 April 1974, 3-4, 9 ill., cited in Lerner/ Williamson book, p. 717, in external links), Vancouver Art Gallery Article 6995 in this book is a précis of Ted Lindberg's article "Gordon Rice" in Vanguard 3 no. 3 (April 1974) 3-4. 9 ill.
- Malkin, Peter (1976), Current Pursuits: an exhibition of the explorations and expressions of nine contemporary British Columbia artists: Keith Allan Detheridge, Sherry Grauer, Jean Heriot, Dan MacDougall, Richard Prince, Gordon Rice, Ron Stonier, Alan Wood, Robert Young: Catalogue of an exhibition held at the Vancouver Art Gallery, 8 Oct.-14 Nov., 1976, Vancouver Art Gallery
- Morris, Jerrold (1980), 100 years of Canadian Drawings, Methuen, ISBN 0-458-94570-6
- Varley, Christopher (1979), Gordon Rice: BC Painter: April 27 - June 10, 1979, Edmonton Art Gallery
