= 2018 South American Rhythmic Gymnastics Championships =

International rhythmic gymnastics competition

The 2018 South American Rhythmic Gymnastics Championships were held in Melgar, Colombia, October 22–29, 2018. The competition was organized by the Colombian Gymnastics Federation.

== Participating nations ==
- Argentina
- Bolivia
- Brazil
- Chile
- Colombia
- Ecuador
- Peru
- Uruguay
- Venezuela

== Medal summary ==
=== Senior ===
| Event | Gold | Silver | Bronze |
|---|---|---|---|
| Team all-around | Brazil; Heloisa Bornal; Barbara Domingos; Natália Gaudio | Colombia; Lina Dussan; Vanessa Galindo; Oriana Viñas | Chile; Fernanda Labra; Javiera Rubilar; Montserrat Urrutia |
| Individual all-around | Barbara Domingos (BRA) | Natália Gaudio (BRA) | Lina Dussan (COL) |
| Hoop | Barbara Domingos (BRA) | Heloisa Bornal (BRA) | Vanessa Galindo (COL) |
| Ball | Natália Gaudio (BRA) | Barbara Domingos (BRA) | Oriana Viñas (COL) |
| Clubs | Barbara Domingos (BRA) | Natália Gaudio (BRA) | Lina Dussan (COL) |
| Ribbon | Barbara Domingos (BRA) | Natália Gaudio (BRA) | Sofia Bergliaffa (ARG) |
| Group all-around | Brazil; Drielly Daltoé; Carolina Garcia; Simone Luiz; Fernanda de Paula; Jéssica Silveira | Chile; Catalina Araya; Isidora Vergara; Javiera Aravena; Maria Ignacia León; Valentina Cuello; Catalina Zapata | Peru; Aitana Orrego; Georgina Vidalon; Camila Rodriguez; Sharon Davila; Carmen Leon |
| Group 5 hoops | Chile; Catalina Araya; Isidora Vergara; Javiera Aravena; Maria Ignacia León; Valentina Cuello; Catalina Zapata | Brazil; Drielly Daltoé; Carolina Garcia; Simone Luiz; Fernanda de Paula; Jessica Silveira | Peru; Aitana Orrego; Georgina Vidalon; Camila Rodriguez; Sharon Davila; Carmen Leon |
| Group 3 balls and 2 ropes | Brazil; Drielly Daltoé; Carolina Garcia; Simone Luiz; Fernanda de Paula; Jessica Silveira | Chile; Catalina Araya; Isidora Vergara; Javiera Aravena; Maria Ignacia León; Valentina Cuello; Catalina Zapata | Peru; Aitana Orrego; Georgina Vidalon; Camila Rodriguez; Sharon Davila; Carmen Leon |

=== Senior ===
| Rank | Nation | Gold | Silver | Bronze | Total |
|---|---|---|---|---|---|
| 1 | Brazil (BRA) | 8 | 6 | 0 | 14 |
| 2 | Chile (CHI) | 1 | 2 | 1 | 4 |
| 3 | Colombia (COL) | 0 | 1 | 4 | 5 |
| 4 | Peru (PER) | 0 | 0 | 3 | 3 |
| 5 | Argentina (ARG) | 0 | 0 | 1 | 1 |
| Totals (5 entries) | | 9 | 9 | 9 | 27 |
