= Donald Maxwell (illustrator) =

English writer and illustrator

Donald Maxwell (14 April 1877 – 25 July 1936) was an English writer and illustrator, still notable for his topographical paintings. Several of his works were displayed as prints in railway carriages.

== Life and family ==
Donald Maxwell was born in Clapham, Surrey (now part of London), the son of Dr Frederick Charles Maxwell, a Methodist clergyman and schoolmaster, and his wife Lucilla, also an illustrator. His father had founded the Manor House School in Clapham in 1876, where Donald's childhood was probably spent. He had at least four siblings: Stanley, Colin, and Gordon (1883–1942), who also became an author and illustrator, and a sister Maud. Both Donald and Gordon became keen yachtsmen and served as official Admiralty artists in World War I.

Maxwell trained in London at the Clapham School of Art, the University College London Slade School of Fine Art, and the Royal College of Art. In 1907, he married Fanny Eveline Marie Morgan (died 1954) and lived with her initially in a yacht moored on the River Thames at Southend-on-Sea named "Puffin". They moved to Rochester, Kent and then to the adjacent village of Borstal, where their elder daughter Audrey Eveline Lucilla was born in 1909. A second daughter, Veronica Edith Stanley, was born in 1914. In 1930, Maxwell bought the large mid-18th century East Farleigh House near Maidstone in Kent, but moved to the late-18th century Goddington House in nearby Harrietsham shortly before he died in 1936, of septicaemia brought on by a chill. He was buried in East Farleigh churchyard.

== Artist and author ==
Maxwell trained in London at the Clapham School of Art, the Slade School of Fine Art, and the Royal College of Art. He was soon writing and illustrating extensively for The Yachting Monthly and other magazines. In about 1909, he became a regular correspondent for the Daily Graphic and the illustrated weekly The Graphic and continued so until the latter closed in 1932. In later life he wrote weekly illustrated articles for the Church Times.

Most of Maxwell's thirty or more self-illustrated books were about voyages in (Europe, Mesopotamia, Palestine, and India) and later about the sights of Southern England.One of his books 'New Lights of London', is compiled of pictures first published in the Graphic. In the text he discusses the hidden rivers of London and new tunnels under the Thames, amongst other themes. Maxwell also illustrated books by many other authors, including Hilaire Belloc and also Rudyard Kipling, to whom his mother was related.

Interest in Maxwell's work as an artist has continued. Several of his topographical paintings were bought by the Southern Railway and displayed as prints in railway carriages. These have since become collector's items. A lithograph of a water colour by Maxwell showing Shap Fell in Cumbria, printed for the London, Midland and Scottish Railway, sold at auction for £517 in 1999, and a marine oil painting for £5520 in 1998. A folio of unframed drawings by Maxwell fetched £840 at auction in 2005, .
