= Carmen Leon =

American painter

Carmen Leon is an American painter and teacher known for her work in the Watsonville, Santa Cruz area.

== Biography ==
Carmen Leon was born in San Francisco to Peruvian and Mexican immigrant parents. Leon began her art education by attending the Ecole des Beaux Art in Paris, France. Through this, she was able to travel across Europe visiting museums and expanding her knowledge on classical art. Leon decided to come back to California to reconnect to her cultural heritage which coincided with the Chicano movement. Leon would enroll at the University of California Santa Cruz and received a Bachelor of Arts in 1975. This is where Leon would meet artist and professor Eduardo Carrillo who would then become a mentor for Leon. When asked about her relationship with Carrillo she states, “having Eduardo Carrillo as my mentor and my teacher was like being given an opening into a world that I never dreamed I would find a place in. Not only did he teach me to be part of something larger than myself, but he also allowed me to take pride in and express my cultural heritage”. While studying at University of California Santa Cruz Leon participated in the Academia del Arte Chicano de Aztlan, which painted the first murals around Watsonville. In 1985, she began teaching art for the Cultural Council of Santa Cruz program called Spectra which focused on Latinx communities. Leon helped co-found the Galeria Tonantzin, a gallery for women to share their artwork in San Juan Bautista, CA. Leon received the Calabash Award as visual artist of the year, for her career as a painter and teacher in 2003.

== Art ==
- Leon's work with the Califas Legacy Project led her to becoming a featured artist on Google Arts & Culture online exhibition.
- Leon often works with the Pajaro Valley Arts presenting and guest speaking.
- Leon was featured at Eduardo Carrillo: Comunidad De Califas Virtual Gallery hosted by the University of California Santa Cruz.
- Leon was a featured guest for the Monterey Museum of Art’s third annual Art of the State Symposium, Change=Action/Time, Generational Activism in Chicanx and Latinx Art.
- Leon collaborated with writer Alma Luz Villanueva to create the cover art for her book Naked Ladies.
- Leon's art was published in Contextos: Poemas by Juvenal Acosta Hernández.
