= Juliette Carrillo =

American theatre director

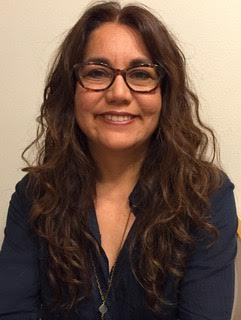
- Born: Los Angeles, CA
- Education: UC Santa Cruz, Yale School of Drama
- Known for: theater, film, playwriting
- Notable work: "Lydia" at the Denver Theater Center, "Anna in the Tropics" at South Coast Repertory, "References to Salvador Dali Make Me Hot" at South Coast Repertory, "I Am Not Your Perfect Mexican Daughter" at Seattle Repertory Theater, "Mojada" at the Oregon Shakespeare Festival
- Style: Naturalism, Magical Realism, Drama, Comedy, Realism
- Awards: Princess Grace Award, NEA/TCG Directing Fellowship, Gypsy Rose Lee Awards, GLAAD Award, Drama-Logue Award
- Elected: Stage Directors and Choreographers Society
- Website: https://www.juliettecarrillo.com/index.html

Juliette Carrillo is an American theatre director, playwright, and filmmaker. She has directed plays and musicals at the Denver Theater Center, Yale Repertory Theater, South Coast Repertory, Mark Taper Forum, the Oregon Shakespeare Festival, Seattle Repertory Theatre, the Magic Theatre, Alliance Theatre, Arizona Theater Company, and the Actor's Theatre of Louisville.

For seven years, she served as an Artistic Associate of South Coast Repertory and led their Hispanic Playwright's Project. She is also a member of Cornerstone Theatre Company, where she writes and directs community-centered new plays. Carrillo primarily develops new plays and has directed workshops at New York Theatre Workshop, The Public, INTAR, and The Women's Project. She has received the Princess Grace Award and the National Endowment of the Arts/Theatre Communications Group Directing Fellowship.

== Early life ==
Carrillo was born in a multicultural household in Los Angeles, CA. She grew up in La Paz, Baja California Sur in Mexico and in Northern California. She has Mexican-American and Jewish heritage, and her father is the Chicano painter Eduardo Carrillo. She is currently a board member of the Museo Eduardo Carrillo. She currently resides in Los Angeles.

== Education ==
Carrillo received her BA in Theatre Arts from the University of California, Santa Cruz before obtaining her MFA in directing from the Yale School of Drama.

== Career ==
Carrillo has directed several premieres of new plays and often collaborates with Hispanic playwrights. She directed the world premiere of "Lydia" by Octavio Solis at the Denver Theater Center, and its subsequent productions at Mark Taper Forum and Yale Repertory Theater. The New York Times said of the play, "Seductive and strong. Juliette Carrillo has directed with enormous skill and knowing compassion."

Other World and West Coast premieres include Nilo Cruz' "Anna in the Tropics," Jose Rivera's "References to Salvador Dalí Make Me Hot"; and Karen Zacarías' "Jane of the Jungle" at South Coast Repertory; Eduardo Machado’s "The Cook" and Isaac Gomez' adaptation of "I Am Not Your Perfect Mexican Daughter" at Seattle Repertory Theater; Sam Shepard's "Eyes for Consuela" at the Magic Theatre; Karen Zacarías' "Oliverio" at the Kennedy Center; Octavio Solis’ "Lethe" at Cornerstone Theater; Carmen Aguirre's "Anywhere But Here" at The Electric Company; Melinda Lopez' "Sonia Flew" at Laguna Playhouse; and Benjamin Benne's "Alma" at Center Theatre Group.

Her other American regional theater productions include "Two Trains Running" by August Wilson at Arena Stage, and "The Sign on Sidney Brustein's Window" by Lorraine Hansberry and "Mojada" by Luis Alfaro at the Oregon Shakespeare Festival.

As an ensemble member of Cornerstone Theater, Carrillo has directed numerous productions and collaborated with communities in creating original work. She has worked with communities such as the Los Angeles River community, the addiction and recovery community, the senior community, and the Hindu community. Productions she directed at Cornerstone include "The Cardinal" by Cusi Cram, "Bliss Point" by Shishir Kurup, "It’s All Bueno" by Sigrid Gilmer, "Touch The Water" by Julie Hébert, "Warriors Don’t Cry" adapted by Eisa Davis, "As Vishnu Dreams" by Shishir Kurup, and "House on Mango Street" by Sandra Cisnersos.

Carrillo was an artistic associate at South Coast Repertory for seven years, directing in their season and running the Hispanic Playwright's Project, which collaborated with Latino playwrights such as Jose Rivera and Nilo Cruz.

Carrillo has also ventured into film directing and screenwriting. She participated in the American Film Institute Directing Workshop for Women, where she wrote and directed the short film "Spiral". It was screened at film festivals in the United States and Europe. Carrillo wrote the screenplay "SuperChicas", which was selected for the National Association of Latino Independent Producer’s Latino Producer’s Lab in Santa Fe. The screenplay was then selected for the Emerging Narratives pitchfest at Independent Film Week, and endorsed by Francis Ford Coppola. Carrillo also participated in the Honolulu 48 Hour Film Project, where her short film a-litter-a-tion won Best Overall, Best Writing, and Best Acting.

Carrillo is currently the Head of Directing program at the Claire Trevor School of the Arts.

== Playwriting ==
Carrillo has written four plays that were commissioned by Cornerstone Theater Company. These include "Plumas Negras", produced with artists and audience members from the East Salinas farmworker community, "Little Voice", a play about eating habits for teen audiences, "Ghost Town", produced for and with the Venice, CA community, and "Pedro Play" performed by and for the San Pedro, CA community. "Plumas Negras" was later produced at UC Irvine Drama in 2018.

Additionally, a reading of her play "Tailbone" was done at Chautauqua Theater Company in 2021, and was selected by Milagro and Teatros Unidos as a finalist for the Ingenio Virtual Theatre Festival.

== Awards and recognition ==
=== Awards and honors ===
- Princess Grace Award
- NEA/TCG Directing Fellowship
- Gypsy Rose Lee Awards in Seattle in the Excellence in Production, Direction, and Ensemble for "Brothers Size" at Seattle Repertory.
- GLAAD award for Outstanding Los Angeles Theater, "Lydia" at the Mark Taper Forum
- Selected to participate in the Sundance Theater Director's Retreat in Arles, France.
- "Mojada" at Mark Taper Forum selected to represent USA for the Prague Quadrennial
- Selected to participate in the Fornes Playwriting Workshop at Fornes Institute in Chicago
- Award for Outstanding Advocacy for Latina/o voices in the New American Theatre, Latino Theater Commons
- Examiner Awards ("Xammies") for Best Director and Production, "The Glass Menagerie" at Arizona Theater Company
- Henry Awards for Best Production, New Play and Ensemble, "Lydia" at the Denver Theater Center
- Ten Drama-Logue Awards for "Sidney Bechet Killed a Man" at South Coast Repertory

=== Nominations ===
- United States Artist Award in Theater
- Finalist - Alan Schneider Award for Directing, six-time nominee
- Ovation Awards for Best Director and Best Production, "Lydia" at the Denver Theater Center
- Ovation Awards, "Lydia" at the Mark Taper Forum
- Finalist - Zelda Fichandler Award
- Gregory Award for Best Production, "Two Trains Running" at Seattle Repertory Theater
- Runner up - Nuestras Voces Playwriting Competition, Repertorio Español, "Plumas Negras"
