= Bianca Mendonça =

Brazilian rhythmic gymnast

- Full name: Bianca Maia Mendonça
- Born: 18 August 1993 (age 33) Manaus

Gymnastics career
- Discipline: Rhythmic gymnastics
- Country represented: Brazil (2011-2013)
- Head coach: Camila Ferezin
- Retired: yes
Medal record
Representing Brazil
Rhythmic Gymnastics
Event	1st	2nd	3rd
FIG World Cup	0	0	1
Total	0	0	1
Pan American Games
Gold medal – first place	2011 Guadalajara	Group all-around
Gold medal – first place	2011 Guadalajara	5 balls
Gold medal – first place	2011 Guadalajara	3 ribbons + 2 hoops
South American Championships
Gold medal – first place	2011 Maracaibo	Group all-around
Gold medal – first place	2011 Maracaibo	5 balls
Gold medal – first place	2011 Maracaibo	3 ribbons + 2 hoops
Gold medal – first place	2012 Cali	Group all-around
Gold medal – first place	2012 Cali	5 balls
Gold medal – first place	2012 Cali	3 ribbons + 2 hoops
Gold medal – first place	2013 Santiago	Group all-around
Gold medal – first place	2013 Santiago	10 clubs
Gold medal – first place	2013 Santiago	3 balls + 2 ribbons

Bianca Maia Mendonça (born 18 August 1993) is a retired Brazilian rhythmic gymnast. She represented her country in international competitions.

== Biography ==
Bianca took up rhythmic gymnastics at five years old, joining the ADIEE/UDESC club, later she joimed the Brazilian national team.

In 2011, as part of the Brazilian group, she took 11th place at the World Cup in Portimão. In May of the same year the group took 6th place at the stage in Kyiv. In September she was selected for the World Championships in Montpellier, along Dayane Amaral, Debora Andreazi Falda, Luisa Matsuo, Drielly Neves Daltoe and Eliane Rosa Sampaio, took 22nd place in the All-Around. In October the group won gold overall, with 5 balls and with 3 ribbons & 2 hoops at the South American Championships. A month later they again won all golds at the Pan American Games.

At the 2012 South American Championships the group repeated the success of the year before. In May 2013 Bianca was part of the group that won an historical bronze medal with 3 ribbons & 2 hoops at the World Cup in Minsk, it was the first World Cup medal for Brazil and Latin America and also only the second medal for America at the event. Again selected for the World Championships the group made of Bianca, Debora Andreazi Falda, Gabriela Paixao Ribeiro, Dayane Amaral, Beatriz Francisco and Francielly Machado Pereira, took 12th place in the All-Around. In December the group won all three gold medals at the 2013 South American Championships.

After her retirement she worked as a coach and as commentator for Rete Globo at the 2016 Olympic Games.
