= 2014 South American Rhythmic Gymnastics Championships =

The 2014 South American Rhythmic Gymnastics Championships were held in Cúcuta, Colombia, October 15–19, 2014. The competition was organized by the Colombian Gymnastics Federation and approved by the International Gymnastics Federation.

== Medalists ==
Event	Gold	Silver	Bronze
Team all-around	Brazil; Natália Gaudio; Andressa Jardim; Ana Paula Ribeiro; Stephany Gonçalves	Colombia; Lina Dussan; Wendy Cifuentes; Carolina Vélez; Laura Angarita	Argentina; Darya Shara; Ayelen Paez; Virginia Pucheta; Agustina Flores
Individual all-around	Natália Gaudio (BRA)	Andressa Jardim (BRA)	Lina Dussan (COL)
Hoop	Natália Gaudio (BRA)	Stephany Gonçalves (BRA)	Lina Dussan (COL)
Ball	Andressa Jardim (BRA)	Stephany Gonçalves (BRA)	Lina Dussan (COL)
Ribbon	Natália Gaudio (BRA)	Andressa Jardim (BRA)	Lina Dussan (COL)
Clubs	Natália Gaudio (BRA)	Andressa Jardim (BRA)	Lina Dussan (COL)
