= Natália Sanchez =

Brazilian rhythmic gymnast

Natalia Sanchez
- Full name: Natalia Peixinho Sanchez
- Born: 12 May 1988 (age 38) São Bernardo do Campo
- Height: 161 cm (5 ft 3 in)

Gymnastics career
- Discipline: Rhythmic gymnastics
- Country represented: Brazil (2005-2009 (?))
Medal record
Pan American Games
Gold medal – first place	2007 Rio de Janeiro	Group all-around
Gold medal – first place	2007 Rio de Janeiro	5 ropes
Gold medal – first place	2007 Rio de Janeiro	3 hoops + 4 clubs
Pan American Championships
Gold medal – first place	2005 Vitória	Groups all-around
Gold medal – first place	2005 Vitória	5 ribbons
Gold medal – first place	2005 Vitória	3 hoops + 4 clubs
South American Championships
Gold medal – first place	2010 Cochabamba	Group all-around
Gold medal – first place	2010 Cochabamba	5 hoops
Gold medal – first place	2010 Cochabamba	3 ribbons + 2 ropes

Natalia Peixinho Sanchez (Note: This name uses Portuguese naming customs: the first or maternal family name is Peixinho and the second or paternal family name is Sanchez.) (born 12 May 1988) is a Brazilian group rhythmic gymnast. She represents her nation at international competitions. She competed at world championships, including at the 2005, 2007 and 2009 World Rhythmic Gymnastics Championships.
