= 2012 South American Rhythmic Gymnastics Championships =

Cali 2012 Rhythmic Gymnastics of South America

The 2012 South American Rhythmic Gymnastics Championships were held in Cali, Colombia, September 20–23, 2012. The competition was organized by the Colombian Gymnastics Federation and approved by the International Gymnastics Federation.

== Medalists ==
Event	Gold	Silver	Bronze
Team all-around	Argentina; Ana Carrasco Pini; Camila Giorgi; Nicole Martinez; Evelyn Mast	Venezuela; Andreina Lopez; Maria Martinez; Michelle Sanchez; Damelis Valero	Chile; Valeska Gonzalez; Cristina Bello; Rocio Caibul
Individual all-around	Bruna Morais (BRA)	Simone Luiz (BRA)	Ana Carrasco Pini (ARG)
Hoop	Bruna Morais (BRA)	Simone Luiz (BRA)	Ana Carrasco Pini (ARG)
Ball	Simone Luiz (BRA)	Ana Carrasco Pini (ARG)	Bruna Morais (BRA)
Ribbon	Bruna Morais (BRA)	Ana Carrasco Pini (ARG)	Simone Luiz (BRA)
Clubs	Bruna Morais (BRA)	Simone Luiz (BRA)	Camila Giorgi (ARG)
Group all-around	Brazil; Dayane Amaral; Debora Falda; Beatriz Francisco; Mayra Gmach; Eliane Sampaio; Bianca Mendonça	Venezuela; Marian Parra; Edgarvy Garces; Rosimar Marvez; Kimberly Ordonez; Mary Sevilla; Damelis Valero	None awarded
Group 5 balls	Brazil; Dayane Amaral; Debora Falda; Beatriz Francisco; Mayra Gmach; Eliane Sampaio; Bianca Mendonça	Venezuela; Marian Parra; Edgarvy Garces; Rosimar Marvez; Kimberly Ordonez; Mary Sevilla; Damelis Valero	None awarded
Group 3 ribbons / 2 hoops	Brazil; Dayane Amaral; Debora Falda; Beatriz Francisco; Mayra Gmach; Eliane Sampaio; Bianca Mendonça	Venezuela; Marian Parra; Edgarvy Garces; Rosimar Marvez; Kimberly Ordonez; Mary Sevilla; Damelis Valero	None awarded
