= 2019 South American Rhythmic Gymnastics Championships =

2019 gymnastics competition

The 2019 South American Rhythmic Gymnastics Championships were held in Bogotá, Colombia, May 30 – June 2, 2019. The competition was organized by the Colombian Gymnastics Federation, and approved by the International Gymnastics Federation.

== Participating nations ==
- Argentina
- Bolivia
- Brazil
- Chile
- Colombia
- Peru
- Venezuela

== Medal summary ==
=== Senior ===
Event	Gold	Silver	Bronze
Individual all-around	Natália Gaudio (BRA)	Barbara Domingos (BRA)	Sol Fainberg (ARG)
Hoop	Natália Gaudio (BRA)	Sol Fainberg (ARG)	Barbara Domingos (BRA)
Ball	Natália Gaudio (BRA)	Sol Fainberg (ARG)	Barbara Domingos (BRA)
Clubs	Sol Fainberg (ARG)	Barbara Domingos (BRA)	Lina Dussan (COL)
Ribbon	Barbara Domingos (BRA)	Natália Gaudio (BRA)	Vanessa Galindo (COL)
Group all-around	Brazil; Camila Rossi; Morgana Gmach; Deborah Medrado; Vitoria Guerra; Nicole Pircio; Beatriz Pomini	Venezuela; Maria Waleska Ojeda; Juliette Quiroz; Dahilin Parra; Kizzy Rivas; Sofia Suarez; Jadeliz Zambrano	Argentina; Virginia Lopez; Valentina Londero; Ana Paula Arrascaeta; Karen Morales; Giuliana Casini; Maria Eugenia Reyna
Group 5 balls	Brazil; Camila Rossi; Morgana Gmach; Deborah Medrado; Vitoria Guerra; Nicole Pircio; Beatriz Pomini	Venezuela; Maria Waleska Ojeda; Juliette Quiroz; Dahilin Parra; Kizzy Rivas; Sofia Suarez; Jadeliz Zambrano	Argentina; Virginia Lopez; Valentina Londero; Ana Paula Arrascaeta; Karen Morales; Giuliana Casini; Maria Eugenia Reyna
Group 4 clubs and 3 hoops	Brazil; Camila Rossi; Morgana Gmach; Deborah Medrado; Vitoria Guerra; Nicole Pircio; Beatriz Pomini	Venezuela; Maria Waleska Ojeda; Juliette Quiroz; Dahilin Parra; Kizzy Rivas; Sofia Suarez; Jadeliz Zambrano	Argentina; Virginia Lopez; Valentina Londero; Ana Paula Arrascaeta; Karen Morales; Giuliana Casini; Maria Eugenia Reyna

=== Senior ===
Rank	Nation	Gold	Silver	Bronze	Total
1	Brazil (BRA)	7	3	2	12
2	Argentina (ARG)	1	2	4	7
3	Venezuela (VEN)	0	3	0	3
4	Colombia (COL)	0	0	2	2
Totals (4 entries)		8	8	8	24
