= Javiera Rubilar =

Chilean rhythmic gymnast

- Full name: Javiera Victoria Rubilar Sanhueza
- Born: 6 April 2000 (age 26) Temuco, Chile
- Height: 165 cm (5 ft 5 in)

Gymnastics career
- Discipline: Rhythmic gymnastics
- Country represented: Chile (2016–2025)
- Head coach: Pamela Salazar
Medal record
Rhythmic gymnastics
Representing Chile
South American Championships
Bronze medal – third place	2017 Cochabamba	Team
Bronze medal – third place	2017 Cochabamba	Ribbon
Bronze medal – third place	2018 Melgar	Team
Bronze medal – third place	2022 Paipa	Hoop
Bolivarian Games
Silver medal – second place	2022 Valledupar	Ribbon
Bronze medal – third place	2022 Valledupar	All-around
Bronze medal – third place	2022 Valledupar	Ball

Javiera Victoria Rubilar Sanhueza (born 6 April 2000) is a Chilean former rhythmic gymnast. She participated at the Rhythmic Gymnastics World Championships in 2018 and 2021 and is a four-time South American Championships medalist.

== Gymnastics career ==
Rubilar began rhythmic gymnastics when she was four years old.

Rubilar won two bronze medals at the 2017 South American Championships, including in the ribbon final. At the 2017 Bolivarian Games, she won bronze medals in the all-around, ball, and clubs finals. She placed fourth in the hoop final at the 2018 South American Games, and she won a bronze medal in the team event at the 2018 South American Championships.

Rubilar participated at the 2018 World Championships and finished 108th in the all-around qualifications. She placed 15th in the all-around at the 2019 Pan American Games and did not advance into any apparatus finals. She finished 51st in the all-around qualifications at the 2021 World Championships.

At the 2022 South American Games, Rubilar finished fourth in the hoop, fifth in the ribbon, and sixth in the all-around, ball, and clubs. She won the bronze medal in the all-around at the 2022 Bolivarian Games and also won a silver medal in the ribbon final and a bronze medal in the ball final. She then won a bronze medal at the 2022 South American Championships in the hoop final, behind Geovanna Santos and Oriana Viñas.

Rubilar was the only rhythmic gymnast selected to represent Chile at the 2023 Pan American Games. She placed 13th in the all-around final, and she advanced into the ribbon final, where she finished eighth.

Rubilar announced her retirement from the sport in 2025.
