= Ana Carrasco Pini =

Argentinian gymnast (born 1991)

- Full name: Ana Milagros Carrasco Pini
- Born: 28 August 1991 (age 35)

Gymnastics career
- Discipline: Rhythmic gymnastics
- Country represented: Argentina (2010-2014)
- Retired: yes
Medal record
Rhythmic gymnastics
Representing Argentina
Pan American Games
Bronze medal – third place	2011 Guadalajara	Ribbon
South American Games
Gold medal – first place	2014 Santiago	Clubs
Silver medal – second place	2010 Medellín	Team
Silver medal – second place	2014 Santiago	Hoop
Bronze medal – third place	2010 Medellín	Hoop
Bronze medal – third place	2014 Santiago	All-Around
Bronze medal – third place	2014 Santiago	Ribbon
South American Championships
Gold medal – first place	2012 Cali	Team
Silver medal – second place	2012 Cali	Ball
Silver medal – second place	2012 Cali	Ribbon
Silver medal – second place	2013 Santiago	Team
Bronze medal – third place	2012 Cali	All-Around
Bronze medal – third place	2012 Cali	Hoop
Bronze medal – third place	2013 Santiago	All-Around
Bronze medal – third place	2013 Santiago	Hoop
Bronze medal – third place	2013 Santiago	Ball
Bronze medal – third place	2013 Santiago	Clubs
Bronze medal – third place	2013 Santiago	Ribbon

Ana Milagros Carrasco Pini (born 28 August 1991) is an Argentine retired rhythmic gymnast. She represented her country in international competitions.

== Career ==
In 2010 Ana competed at the South Amnerican Games in Medellín where she won silver in teams and bronze with hoop. In September she was selected for the World Championships in Moscow, finishing 95th in the All-Around, 104th with rope, 119th with hoop, 93rd with ball, 77th with ribbon and 31st in teams.

In 2011 she again competed at the World Championships in Montpellier, she took 85th in the All-Around, 87th with hoop, 91st with ball, 79rd with clubs, 68th with ribbon. In October she took part in the 2011 Pan American Games where she was 8th overall, 5th with hoop, 6th with ball and won bronze with ribbon. Carrasco won team gold, ball and ribbon silver and bronze in the All-Around and with hoop at the 2012 South American Championships. The following year she won silver in teams and bronze in the All-Around and in all finals at the 2013 South American Championships.

Ana competed at the 2014 South American Games, winning bronze in the All-Around and with ribbon, silver with hoop and gold with clubs. At 2014 Pan American Championships in Mississagua, she was 5th in teams, 8th in the All-Around, 7th with hoop and 5th with ribbon. In September she participated first in the World Cup in Kazan, ending 38th overall, and then in the 2014 World Championships in Izmir, ending 88th in the All-Around, 109th with hoop, 107th with ball, 86th with clubs, 64th with ribbon.
