= Andressa Jardim =

Brazilian rhythmic gymnast

Andressa Wendel Jardim
- Full name: Andressa Wendel Jardim
- Born: 28 August 1998 (age 28)

Gymnastics career
- Discipline: Rhythmic gymnastics
- Country represented: Brazil (2014)
Medal record
Rhythmic gymnastics
Representing Brazil
Pan American Championships
Gold medal – first place	2021 Rio de Janeiro	Team
Silver medal – second place	2014 Mississauga	Team
South American Games
Bronze medal – third place	2014 Santiago	Clubs
South American Championships
Gold medal – first place	2014 Cúcuta	Team
Gold medal – first place	2014 Cúcuta	Ball
Gold medal – first place	2021 Cali	Team
Gold medal – first place	2021 Cali	All-around team
Gold medal – first place	2022 Paipa	Team
Gold medal – first place	2022 Paipa	All-around team
Silver medal – second place	2014 Cúcuta	All-around
Silver medal – second place	2014 Cúcuta	Clubs
Silver medal – second place	2014 Cúcuta	Ribbon
Gymnasiade
Bronze medal – third place	2013 Brasilia	All-Around
Bronze medal – third place	2013 Brasilia	Ribbon

Andressa Wendel Jardim (born 28 August 1998) is a Brazilian individual rhythmic gymnast. She represents her nation at international competitions. She competed at world championships, including at the 2014 World Rhythmic Gymnastics Championships.
