= Roberto Esteban Chavez =

American artist (1932–2024)

Roberto Chavez
- Roberto Chavez, El Tamalito del Hoyo, 1959, Smithsonian American Art Museum
- Born: Roberto Esteban Chavez; August 3, 1932; Los Angeles, California, U.S.
- Died: December 17, 2024 (aged 92); Arivaca, Arizona, U.S.
- Education: University of California, Los Angeles
- Notable work: El Tamalito Del Hoyo, 1959; Jealousy or Guilt (The Tale of Genji), 1980
- Spouses: Juliette Salinas (m. 1953; div. 1955); Anna Bardez (m. 1960; div. 1976); Betty Lane Gwinn (m. 1979; sep. 1983); Janet Kassner (m. 2002)
- Children: 6
- Website: RobertoChavez.art

Roberto Esteban Chavez (August 3, 1932 – December 17, 2024) was an American artist, known as "a major figure within U.S. Latinx art history whose work has influenced generations of artists that followed." His personally symbolic portraits, public murals, and "funny-grotesque" paintings reflect the multicultural landscape of Los Angeles. His work has been exhibited in the Getty Center's Pacific Standard Time: Art in L.A., 1945–1980, the Smithsonian’s Our America: The Latino Presence in American Art exhibits and at the Museo del Palacio de Bellas Artes in Mexico City.

== Background ==
Chavez was born in Los Angeles, California, to Mexican immigrants who left the chaos and dangers of post-Revolution Mexico. Chavez and his seven siblings were raised in the Maravilla neighborhood in East Los Angeles, which at the time was inhabited by a mixture of working class families, mostly Latino, but also Jewish, Mexican, Armenian, Italian, Russian and Japanese emigres.

Chavez earned his Master of Fine Arts in 1961 at the University of California at Los Angeles, where he met and worked alongside Charles Garabedian, Gordon Rice, Eduardo Carrillo and Maxwell Hendler. In the early 1960s, Chavez became part of the "emerging gallery scene along La Cienega Boulevard" at the Ceeje Gallery, which in contrast to the Ferus and Landau Galleries that often exhibited New York artists, highlighted local, ethnic and women artists.

Chavez died in Arivaca, Arizona on December 17, 2024, at the age of 92.

== Murals ==
In the mid-1970s, Chavez began painting public murals throughout the city of Los Angeles, especially East L.A. where the La Raza political movement was gaining ground. His 1972 anti-war mural Porque Se Pelean? Que No Son Carnales became part of artist Sandra de la Loza's Mural Remix show at LACMA Mural Remixed.

In 1974, Chavez painted The Path to Knowledge and the False University, a 200 by 30 foot mural on the Rosco C. Ingalls Auditorium on the East Los Angeles Community College campus, where he worked as an arts educator and chair of the Chicano Studies department. Although the mural was destroyed by the college, the mural, its impact and the political questions surrounding the destruction were detailed in two museum exhibits: "Roberto Chavez and The False University: A Retrospective" at the Vincent Price Museum and "¡Murales Rebeldes!: L.A. Chicana/o Murals under Siege" Pacific Standard Time: LA/LA Beyond Borders in 2017, which is accompanied by an exhibition catalogue titled “¡Murales Rebeldes! L.A. Chicana/Chicano Murals Under Siege” published on August 1, 2017.

In 1982, Chavez painted a mural in response to the destruction of The Path to Knowledge and the False University titled The Execution. The mural consisted of a man strapped to an electric chair while a group of people stand around him. The process of painting the mural was recorded by filmmaker Jeff Boice, who at the end of the recording paints over the mural with white. The video ends with a dedication to The Path to Knowledge and the False University.

== Later exhibitions ==
- Advance of the Rear Guard: Ceeje Gallery in the 1960s ArtCenter School of Design, Pasadena, California. October 2023 - March 2024.
- Zapata Después de Zapata Museo del Palacio de Bellas Artes, Mexico City, Mexico November 2019 - February 2020.
- Pacific Standard Time: LA/LA
  - MURALES REBELDES!: Contested Chicana/o Public Art, LA Plaza de Cultura y Artes, Los Angeles, September 2017 - March 2018; San Francisco, California Historical Society, April - September 2018; Sacramento, California Museum, July - December 2019.
  - A Universal History of Infamy, August 2017 - February 2018, LACMA (Los Angeles County Museum of Art
- Our American: The Latino Presence in American Art, Smithsonian American Art Museum, Washington DC, October 2013 - March 2014, National Tour through 2017
- Pacific Standard Time: Art in L.A. 1945 - 1980 exhibits:
  - Art Along the Hyphen: The Mexican-American Generation Autry National Center, Los Angeles October 2011 - January 2012
  - L.A. Raw: Abject Expressionism in Los Angeles, 1945-1980, From Rico Lebrun to Paul McCarthy, Pasadena Museum of California Art 2012 January - May 2012
- Roberto Chavez and The False University: A Retrospective, Vincent Price Art Museum, September - December 2014
