= Lina Dussan =

Colombian rhythmic gymnast (born 1998)

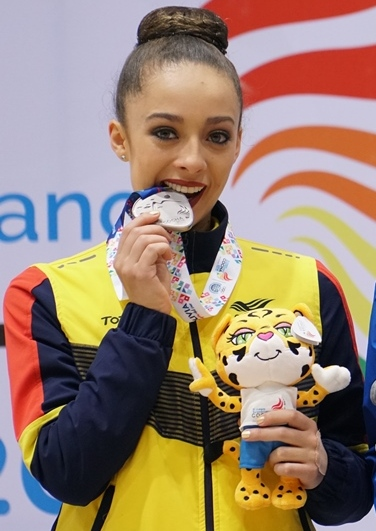
- Full name: Lina Marcela Dussan Orozco
- Born: 15 March 1998 (age 28) Florencia, Colombia
- Height: 164 cm (5 ft 5 in)

Gymnastics career
- Discipline: Rhythmic gymnastics
- Country represented: Colombia; (2014–)
- Club: Bogota District
Medal record
Rhythmic gymnastics
Representing Colombia
Event	1st	2nd	3rd
Pan American Sports Festival	1	1	2
South American Games	0	1	3
South American Championships	1	10	21
CAC Games	0	2	6
Bolivarian Games	7	2	0
Total	9	16	32
Pan American Sports Festival
Gold medal – first place	2014 Guadalajara	Hoop
Silver medal – second place	2014 Guadalajara	Ball
Bronze medal – third place	2014 Guadalajara	Clubs
Bronze medal – third place	2014 Guadalajara	Ribbon
South American Games
Silver medal – second place	2018 Cochabamba	Ball
Bronze medal – third place	2018 Cochabamba	All-around
Bronze medal – third place	2018 Cochabamba	Hoop
Bronze medal – third place	2018 Cochabamba	Clubs
South American Championships
Gold medal – first place	2017 Cochabamba	Hoop
Silver medal – second place	2014 Cúcuta	Team
Silver medal – second place	2015 Cochabamba	Team
Silver medal – second place	2015 Cochabamba	All-around
Silver medal – second place	2016 Paipa	Ball
Silver medal – second place	2017 Cochabamba	Team
Silver medal – second place	2017 Cochabamba	Ball
Silver medal – second place	2017 Cochabamba	Clubs
Silver medal – second place	2018 Melgar	Team
Silver medal – second place	2023 Barranquilla	Ball
Silver medal – second place	2023 Barranquilla	Ribbon
Bronze medal – third place	2014 Cúcuta	All-around
Bronze medal – third place	2014 Cúcuta	Hoop
Bronze medal – third place	2014 Cúcuta	Ball
Bronze medal – third place	2014 Cúcuta	Clubs
Bronze medal – third place	2014 Cúcuta	Ribbon
Bronze medal – third place	2015 Cochabamba	Hoop
Bronze medal – third place	2015 Cochabamba	Ribbon
Bronze medal – third place	2016 Paipa	Team
Bronze medal – third place	2016 Paipa	All-around
Bronze medal – third place	2016 Paipa	Clubs
Bronze medal – third place	2016 Paipa	Ribbon
Bronze medal – third place	2017 Cochabamba	All-around
Bronze medal – third place	2018 Melgar	All-Around
Bronze medal – third place	2018 Melgar	Clubs
Bronze medal – third place	2019 Bogotá	Clubs
Bronze medal – third place	2021 Cali	Team
Bronze medal – third place	2021 Cali	Clubs
Bronze medal – third place	2021 Cali	All-around team
Bronze medal – third place	2023 Barranquilla	Team
Bronze medal – third place	2023 Barranquilla	Hoop
Bronze medal – third place	2023 Barranquilla	All-around team
Central American and Caribbean Games
Silver medal – second place	2023 San Salvador	Team
Silver medal – second place	2023 San Salvador	All-around
Bronze medal – third place	2014 Veracruz	Hoop
Bronze medal – third place	2018 Barranquilla	All-around
Bronze medal – third place	2018 Barranquilla	Hoop
Bronze medal – third place	2018 Barranquilla	Ball
Bronze medal – third place	2023 San Salvador	Hoop
Bronze medal – third place	2023 San Salvador	Clubs
Bolivarian Games
Gold medal – first place	2017 Santa Marta	Team
Gold medal – first place	2017 Santa Marta	All-around
Gold medal – first place	2017 Santa Marta	Ball
Gold medal – first place	2017 Santa Marta	Clubs
Gold medal – first place	2017 Santa Marta	Ribbon
Gold medal – first place	2022 Valledupar	All-around
Gold medal – first place	2022 Valledupar	Hoop
Silver medal – second place	2017 Santa Marta	Hoop
Silver medal – second place	2022 Valledupar	Ball

Lina Dussan (born 15 March 1998) is a Colombian rhythmic gymnast. She participated at the Rhythmic Gymnastics World Championships in 2015, 2019, 2021 and 2022.

== Personal life ==
She took up the sport at age seven in Bogotá; after she attended the National Games and fell in love with the sport, she now trains up to eight hours per day. Her idols are Ukrainian rhythmic gymnasts Alina Maksimenko and Anna Bessonova. In 2017 she won the Utadeo Prize as the Best Athlete at Jorge Tadeo Lozano University in Colombia, where she studies journalism and social and behavioural Science.

== Career ==
Lina debuted at the 2015 World Championships in Stuttgart, ending 95th in the All-Around, 75th with hoop, 94th with ball, 107th with clubs and 109th with ribbon. In October, she won silver in teams and the All-Around and bronze with hoops and ribbon at the South American Championships.

The following year she competed at the World Cups in Sofia, being 33rd in the All-Around,32nd with hoop, 34th with the ball, 29th with clubs and 33rd with ribbon and Guadalajara, where she was 28th in the All-Around, 30th with hoop, 25th with the ball, 21st with clubs and 28th with ribbon. She then won bronze in the teams, in the All-Around and with clubs and ribbon, and silver with the ball at the South American Championships.

In 2017 Dussan competed at the World Cup in Guadalajara, being 32nd in the All-Around, 36th with hoop, 27th with ball, and 30th with clubs and ribbon. At the Pan American Rhythmic Gymnastics Championships, taking 9th place in the All-Around, 18th with hoop, 10th with ball, 8th with clubs and ribbon.

She participated in the World Cup in Portimão, ending 24th in the All-Around, 26th with hoop,19th with ball, 24th with clubs and 23rd with ribbon. In September, she was selected for the 2018 Pan American Championship; she was 5th in teams and 16th in the All-Around. In October, she won silver in teams and bronze in the All-Around and with clubs at the South American Championships.

In 2019 she participated in the World Cups in Baku, 65th in the All-Around, 61st with hoop, 67th with a ball, 52nd with clubs and 65th with ribbon, and Guadalajara was 31st in the All-Around, 34th with hoop, 35th with the ball, 29th with clubs and 34th with ribbon. In September, she competed at the World Championships in Baku, ending 72nd in the All-Around, 63rd with hoop, 73rd with ball, 97th in clubs and 100th with ribbon.

After the 2020 season was cut short because of the COVID-19 pandemic, Lina returned to competition at the 2021 World Cup in Baku, ending 49th in the All-Around, 43rd with hoop, 48th with ball, 45th with clubs and 52nd with ribbon, then in Minsk ending 17th in the All-Around, 14th with hoop, 19th with ball,17th with clubs and 15th with ribbon. In June, she participated in the Pan American Championships, taking 10th place in the All-Around, 13th with hoop, 8th with the ball, 9th with the ball, 9th with clubs, 11th with ribbon and 5th in teams. At the World Championships, she took 45th place in the All-Around, 47th with hoop, 48th with ball, 44th with clubs and 42nd with ribbon. She then participated in the South American Championships, winning two bronze medals in teams and with clubs.

In 2022 she made her debut at the World Cup in Tashkent, ending 18th in the All-Around, 14th with hoop, 20th with ball, 19th with clubs and 18th with ribbon. After that, she was in Portimão 22nd in the All-Around, 18th with hoop, 25th with ball, 28th with clubs and 26th with ribbon. In July, she competed at the Pan American Championships, being 12th in the All-Around, 8th with hoop, 13th with ball, 15th with clubs and 13th with ribbon. Dussan was then selected for the World Championships. She was 52nd in the All-Around, 48th with hoop, 46th with the ball, 64th with clubs and 65th with ribbon. In October, she competed at the South American Games ending 4th in the All-Around, 6th with hoop, 4th with ball, 4th with clubs and 6th with ribbon.
