= 2013 South American Rhythmic Gymnastics Championships =

International sporting competition

The 2013 South American Rhythmic Gymnastics Championships were held in Santiago, Chile, December 10–15, 2013.

== Medalists ==
Event	Gold	Silver	Bronze
Team all-around	Brazil; Natália Gaudio; Angélica Kvieczynski; Emanuelle Lima; Simone Luiz	Argentina; Ana Carrasco Pini; Ayelen Paez; Camila Giorgi; Evelyn Mast	Chile; Valeska Gonzalez; Valentina Castro; Ignacia Baeza
Individual all-around	Natália Gaudio (BRA)	Angélica Kvieczynski (BRA)	Ana Carrasco Pini (ARG)
Hoop	Natália Gaudio (BRA)	Emanuelle Lima (BRA)	Ana Carrasco Pini (ARG)
Ball	Angélica Kvieczynski (BRA)	Natália Gaudio (BRA)	Ana Carrasco Pini (ARG)
Ribbon	Angélica Kvieczynski (BRA)	Natália Gaudio (BRA)	Ana Carrasco Pini (ARG)
Clubs	Angélica Kvieczynski (BRA)	Natália Gaudio (BRA)	Ana Carrasco Pini (ARG)
Group all-around	Brazil; Bianca Mendonça; Beatriz Pomini; Dayane Amaral; Debora Falda; Francielly Pereira; Mayra Gmach	Chile	Argentina
Group 10 clubs	Brazil; Bianca Mendonça; Beatriz Pomini; Dayane Amaral; Debora Falda; Francielly Pereira; Mayra Gmach	Chile	Argentina
Group 3 balls + 2 ribbons	Brazil; Bianca Mendonça; Beatriz Pomini; Dayane Amaral; Debora Falda; Francielly Pereira; Mayra Gmach	Chile	Argentina
