= 2010 South American Rhythmic Gymnastics Championships =

International rhythmic gymnastics competition

The 2010 South American Rhythmic Gymnastics Championships were held in Cochabamba, Bolivia, November 18–23, 2010. The competition was organized by the Bolivian Gymnastics Federation and approved by the International Gymnastics Federation.

== Medalists ==
Event	Gold	Silver	Bronze
Team all-around	Brazil; Natália Gaudio; Samyra Zumak; Luísa França	Argentina; Sofia Speratti; Yanina Liendro; Evelyn Mast	Chile; Rocio Caibul; Magdalena Miranda; Catalina Magnere; Catalina Oelckers
Individual all-around	Natália Gaudio (BRA)	Samyra Zumak (BRA)	Luísa França (BRA)
Rope	Natália Gaudio (BRA)	Luísa França (BRA)	Evelyn Mast (ARG)
Hoop	Natália Gaudio (BRA)	Samyra Zumak (BRA)	Evelyn Mast (ARG)
Ball	Natália Gaudio (BRA)	Samyra Zumak (BRA)	Sofia Speratti (ARG)
Ribbon	Natália Gaudio (BRA)	Samyra Zumak (BRA)	Evelyn Mast (ARG)
Group all-around	Brazil; Natália Gaudio; Natalia Peixinho; Luciane Hammes; Luísa França; Samyra Zumak; Marcela Rocha	Chile	Unknown
Group 5 hoops	Brazil; Natália Gaudio; Natalia Peixinho; Luciane Hammes; Luísa França; Samyra Zumak; Marcela Rocha	Chile	Unknown
Group 3 ribbons + 2 ropes	Brazil; Natália Gaudio; Natalia Peixinho; Luciane Hammes; Luísa França; Samyra Zumak; Marcela Rocha	Chile	Unknown
