= Camila Rossi =

Brazilian rhythmic gymnast

- Full name: Camila Rossi Godinho
- Born: 8 October 1999 (age 26)

Gymnastics career
- Discipline: Rhythmic gymnastics
- Country represented: Brazil
Medal record
Rhythmic gymnastics
Representing Brazil
Pan American Games
Gold medal – first place	2019 Lima	3 hoops + 2 clubs
Bronze medal – third place	2019 Lima	Group all-around
Bronze medal – third place	2019 Lima	5 balls
South American Championships
Gold medal – first place	2019 Bogotá	Group all-around
Gold medal – first place	2019 Bogotá	5 balls
Gold medal – first place	2019 Bogotá	3 hoops + 4 clubs

Camila Rossi (born 8 October 1999) is a Brazilian rhythmic gymnast.

She competed at the 2019 Pan American Games where she won a gold medal in the 3 hoops + 2 clubs event and bronze medals in the group all-around and 5 balls event.
