= 2011 South American Rhythmic Gymnastics Championships =

International rhythmic gymnastics competition

The 2011 South American Rhythmic Gymnastics Championships were held in Maracaibo, Venezuela, September 6–12, 2011.

== Participating nations ==
- Argentina
- Bolivia
- Brazil
- Chile
- Colombia
- Ecuador
- Peru
- Venezuela

== Medalists ==
Event	Gold	Silver	Bronze
Team all-around	Brazil; Morgana Gmach; Monize Gmach; Jéssica Silveira	Argentina; Ayelen Paez; Florencia Aracama; Diana Vazquez; Evelyn Mast	Chile; Valeska Gonzalez; Cristina Bello; Rocio Caibul
Individual all-around	Morgana Gmach (BRA)	Monize Gmach (BRA)	Evelyn Mast (ARG)
Hoop	Morgana Gmach (BRA)	Monize Gmach (BRA)	Diana Vazquez (ARG)
Ball	Monize Gmach (BRA)	Ayelen Paez (ARG)	Morgana Gmach (BRA)
Ribbon	Morgana Gmach (BRA)	Ayelen Paez (ARG)	Florencia Aracama (ARG)
Clubs	Monize Gmach (BRA)	Morgana Gmach (BRA)	Florencia Aracama (ARG)
Group all-around	Brazil; Luisa Matsuo; Jessica Maier; Debora Falda; Drielly Daltoe; Bianca Mendonça; Eliane Sampaio	Venezuela	None awarded
Group 5 balls	Brazil; Luisa Matsuo; Jessica Maier; Debora Falda; Drielly Daltoe; Bianca Mendonça; Eliane Sampaio	Venezuela	None awarded
Group 3 ribbons + 2 hoops	Brazil; Luisa Matsuo; Jessica Maier; Debora Falda; Drielly Daltoe; Bianca Mendonça; Eliane Sampaio	Venezuela	None awarded
