= Natália Gaudio =

Brazilian rhythmic gymnast

Natalia Gaudio
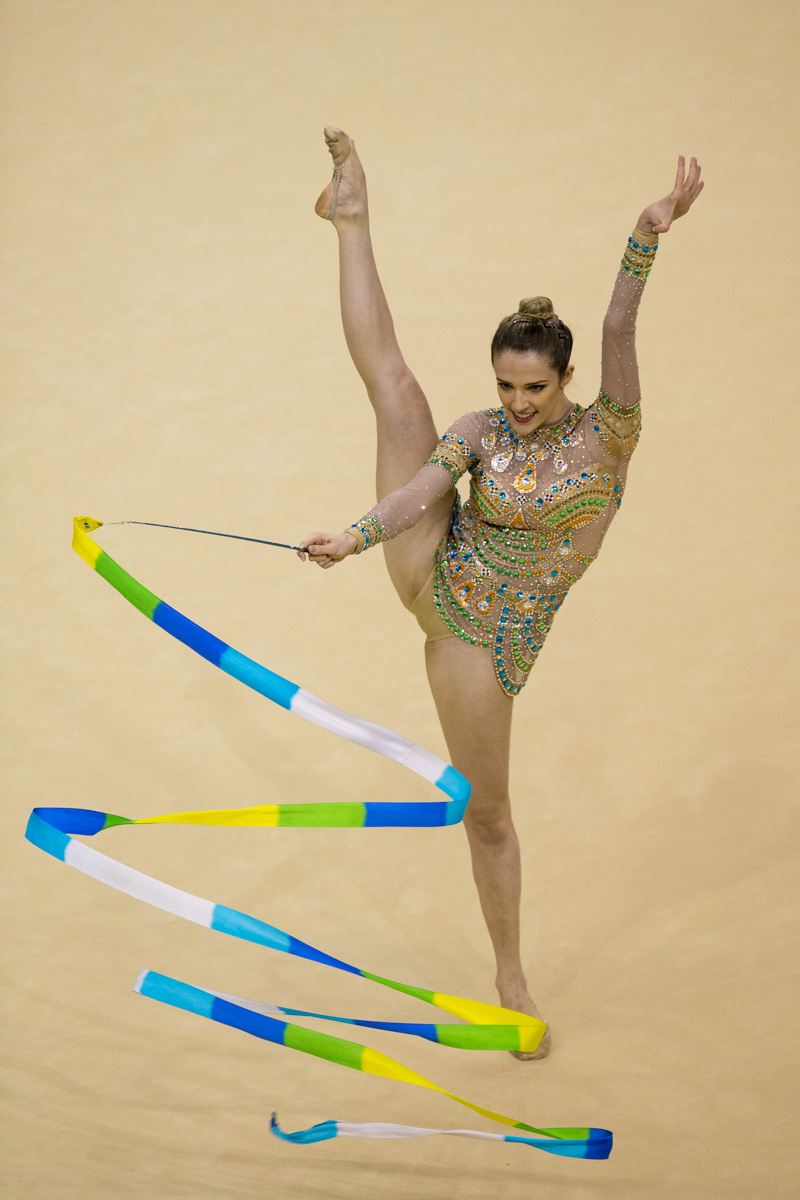

Personal information
- Full name: Natalia Azevedo Gaudio
- Nickname: Naty
- Born: 18 December 1992 (age 33) Vitória, Brazil
- Height: 170 cm (5 ft 7 in)

Gymnastics career
- Discipline: Rhythmic gymnastics
- Country represented: Brazil
- College team: University of Vila Velha
- Club: Escola de Campeas
- Head coach: Monika Queiroz
- Choreographer: Anna Bessonova
- Retired: 2021
Medal record
Rhythmic gymnastics
Representing Brazil
Pan American Games
Bronze medal – third place	2019 Lima	All-around
Pan American Championships
Gold medal – first place	2016 Merida	All-around
Gold medal – first place	2016 Merida	Hoop
Gold medal – first place	2016 Merida	Clubs
Gold medal – first place	2016 Merida	Ribbon
Gold medal – first place	2021 Rio de Janeiro	Team
Gold medal – first place	2021 Rio de Janeiro	Ribbon
Silver medal – second place	2010 Guadalajara	Team
Silver medal – second place	2014 Mississauga	Team
Silver medal – second place	2016 Merida	Team
Silver medal – second place	2016 Merida	Ball
Silver medal – second place	2016 Merida	Group all-around
Silver medal – second place	2016 Merida	5 ribbons
Silver medal – second place	2016 Merida	6 clubs + 2 hoops
Silver medal – second place	2021 Rio de Janeiro	Ball
Bronze medal – third place	2017 Daytona Beach	Team
Bronze medal – third place	2017 Daytona Beach	Hoop
Bronze medal – third place	2017 Daytona Beach	Ball
Bronze medal – third place	2018 Lima	Team
Bronze medal – third place	2018 Lima	All-around
Bronze medal – third place	2021 Rio de Janeiro	All-around
South American Games
Gold medal – first place	2014 Santiago	Ball
Gold medal – first place	2014 Santiago	Clubs
Gold medal – first place	2018 Cochabamba	All-around
Gold medal – first place	2018 Cochabamba	Hoop
Gold medal – first place	2018 Cochabamba	Clubs
Gold medal – first place	2018 Cochabamba	Ribbon
Silver medal – second place	2014 Santiago	All-around
Silver medal – second place	2014 Santiago	Ribbon
Bronze medal – third place	2014 Santiago	Hoop
South American Championships
Gold medal – first place	2010 Cochabamba	Team
Gold medal – first place	2010 Cochabamba	All-around
Gold medal – first place	2010 Cochabamba	Rope
Gold medal – first place	2010 Cochabamba	Hoop
Gold medal – first place	2010 Cochabamba	Ball
Gold medal – first place	2010 Cochabamba	Ribbon
Gold medal – first place	2010 Cochabamba	Group all-around
Gold medal – first place	2010 Cochabamba	5 hoops
Gold medal – first place	2010 Cochabamba	3 ribbons + 2 ropes
Gold medal – first place	2013 Santiago	Team
Gold medal – first place	2013 Santiago	All-around
Gold medal – first place	2013 Santiago	Hoop
Gold medal – first place	2014 Cúcuta	Team
Gold medal – first place	2014 Cúcuta	All-around
Gold medal – first place	2014 Cúcuta	Hoop
Gold medal – first place	2014 Cúcuta	Ball
Gold medal – first place	2014 Cúcuta	Clubs
Gold medal – first place	2015 Cochabamba	Team
Gold medal – first place	2015 Cochabamba	All-around
Gold medal – first place	2015 Cochabamba	Hoop
Gold medal – first place	2015 Cochabamba	Ball
Gold medal – first place	2015 Cochabamba	Clubs
Gold medal – first place	2015 Cochabamba	Ribbon
Gold medal – first place	2016 Paipa	All-around
Gold medal – first place	2016 Paipa	Hoop
Gold medal – first place	2016 Paipa	Ball
Gold medal – first place	2016 Paipa	Clubs
Gold medal – first place	2016 Paipa	Ribbon
Gold medal – first place	2016 Paipa	Team
Gold medal – first place	2017 Cochabamba	Team
Gold medal – first place	2017 Cochabamba	All-around
Gold medal – first place	2017 Cochabamba	Ball
Gold medal – first place	2017 Cochabamba	Clubs
Gold medal – first place	2017 Cochabamba	Ribbon
Gold medal – first place	2018 Melgar	Team
Gold medal – first place	2018 Melgar	Ball
Gold medal – first place	2019 Bogotá	All-around
Gold medal – first place	2019 Bogotá	Hoop
Gold medal – first place	2019 Bogotá	Ball
Silver medal – second place	2013 Santiago	Ball
Silver medal – second place	2013 Santiago	Clubs
Silver medal – second place	2013 Santiago	Ribbon
Silver medal – second place	2018 Melgar	All-around
Silver medal – second place	2018 Melgar	Clubs
Silver medal – second place	2018 Melgar	Ribbon
Silver medal – second place	2019 Bogotá	Ribbon
Bronze medal – third place	2017 Cochabamba	Hoop

Natália Azevedo Gaudio (born 18 December 1992) is a Brazilian individual rhythmic gymnast. She is the 2018 South American Games all-around gold medalist, and the 2019 Pan American Games all-around bronze medalist.

== Personal life ==
Gaudio speaks 3 languages: English, Portuguese, and Spanish. Her hobbies are going to the beach and travelling. Her rhythmic gymnastics idol is Ukrainian Ganna Rizatdinova.

== Career ==
Gaudio started rhythmic gymnastics to 6 years old after she saw some friends practising gymnastics and decided to join them. At 8 years of age she was the runner-up in the All-around rhythmic gymnastics in the state of Espirito Santo, Brazil. Gaudio made her international debut in competitions at 14 years of age, since then she has represented her nation at international competitions.

At the 2014 South American Games, Gaudio won the all-around silver medal behind teammate Angélica Kvieczynski, in the apparatus finals; she won gold in ball, clubs, silver in ribbon and bronze in hoop. She competed at the 2015 Pan American Games where she finished 8th in the all-around, an improvement from her 10th-place finish at the 2011 Pan American Games.

Gaudio has competed at world championships including at the 2014 and at the 2015 World Rhythmic Gymnastics Championships where she was the highest ranked Brazilian rhythmic gymnast ahead of teammate Angélica Kvieczynski. Gaudio also competed at the 2016 Gymnastics Olympic Test Event in Rio de Janeiro and qualified through a wildcard entry for the 2016 Rio Olympics as an automatic berth for the host country of the Olympics. She finished 21st in the all-around at the 2016 Minsk World Cup. On July 1–3, Gaudio competed at the 2016 Berlin World Cup finishing 17th in the all-around.

On August 19–20, Gaudio competed at the 2016 Summer Olympics held in Rio de Janeiro, Brazil. She finished 23rd in the rhythmic gymnastics individual all-around qualifications and did not advance into the top 10 finals.

On August 11–13, Gaudio competed at the 2017 Kazan World Challenge Cup finishing 30th in the all-around. On August 30 - September 3, Gaudio competed at the 2017 World Championships in Pesaro, Italy; finishing 35th in the all-around qualifications and thus not making the top 24 all-around finalists.

In 2018, Gaudio competed at the 2018 Guadalajara World Challenge Cup finishing 31st in the all-around.

In 2019, Gaudio competed at the 2019 Pan American Games in Lima finishing 3rd in the all around, qualifying for the hoop, clubs and ribbon finals.

== See also ==
- List of Olympic rhythmic gymnasts for Brazil
