= Mayra de Fatima Gmach =

Brazilian rhythmic gymnast

- Born: 9 May 1996 (age 30) Toledo, Paraná

Gymnastics career
- Discipline: Rhythmic gymnastics
- Country represented: Brazil (2014)
- Head coach: Camila Ferezin
Medal record
Pan American Championships
Gold medal – first place	2014 Mississauga	Group all-around
Gold medal – first place	2014 Mississauga	10 clubs
Gold medal – first place	2014 Mississauga	3 balls + 2 ribbons
South American Championships
Gold medal – first place	2012 Cali	Group all-around
Gold medal – first place	2012 Cali	5 balls
Gold medal – first place	2012 Cali	3 ribbons + 2 hoops
Gold medal – first place	2013 Santiago	Group all-around
Gold medal – first place	2013 Santiago	10 clubs
Gold medal – first place	2013 Santiago	3 balls + 2 ribbons

Mayra de Fatima Gmach (born 9 May 1996) is a Brazilian group rhythmic gymnast. She represents her nation at international competitions. She competed at world championships, including at the 2014 World Rhythmic Gymnastics Championships.

She has two sisters who are also rhythmic gymnasts: Morgana Gmach and Monize Gmach. All three sisters have represented Brazil internationally, winning medals at the South American Rhythmic Gymnastics Championships.
