= 2016 South American Rhythmic Gymnastics Championships =

International rhythmic gymnastics competition

The 2016 South American Rhythmic Gymnastics Championships were held in Paipa, Colombia, October 6–9, 2016. The competition was organized by the Colombian Gymnastics Federation and approved by the International Gymnastics Federation.

== Medal summary ==
=== Senior medalists ===
Event	Gold	Silver	Bronze
Team all-around	Brazil; Natália Gaudio; Gabriela Ribeiro; Carolina Tonelloto	Venezuela; Michelle Sanchez; Grisbel Lopez; Damelis Valero	Colombia; Lina Dussan; Isabella Arevalo; Veronica Orozco
Individual all-around	Natália Gaudio (BRA)	Michelle Sanchez (VEN)	Lina Dussan (COL)
Hoop	Natália Gaudio (BRA)	Michelle Sanchez (VEN)	Isabella Arevalo (COL)
Ball	Natália Gaudio (BRA)	Lina Dussan (COL)	Michelle Sanchez (VEN)
Clubs	Natália Gaudio (BRA)	Michelle Sanchez (VEN)	Lina Dussan (COL)
Ribbon	Natália Gaudio (BRA)	Michelle Sanchez (VEN)	Lina Dussan (COL)
Group all-around	Chile; Maria Leon; Catalina Araya; Catalina Zapata; Gabriela Vallejo; Tania Fuentes; Maite Arce	Argentina; Gina Polenta; Abril Casella; Trinidad Bahim; Delfina Matheu; Julieta Caballero; Maria Bordoy	—N/a

=== Medal table ===
Senior events

Rank	Nation	Gold	Silver	Bronze	Total
1	Brazil (BRA)	6	0	0	6
2	Chile (CHI)	1	0	0	1
3	Venezuela (VEN)	0	5	1	6
4	Colombia (COL)	0	1	5	6
5	Argentina (ARG)	0	1	0	1
Totals (5 entries)		7	7	6	20
