= 2015 South American Rhythmic Gymnastics Championships =

The 2015 South American Rhythmic Gymnastics Championships were held in Cochabamba, Bolivia, October 8–11, 2015. The competition was organized by the Bolivian Gymnastics Federation and approved by the International Gymnastics Federation.

== Medalists ==
Event	Gold	Silver	Bronze
Team all-around	Brazil; Natália Gaudio; Simone Luiz; Mayra Siñeriz; Carolina Garcia	Colombia; Lina Dussan; Carolina Vélez; Laura Angarita; Daniela Molina	Chile; Valeska Gonzalez; Ignacia Baeza; Valentina Castro
Individual all-around	Natália Gaudio (BRA)	Lina Dussan (COL)	Melissa Pérez (ECU)
Hoop	Natália Gaudio (BRA)	Simone Luiz (BRA)	Lina Dussan (COL)
Ribbon	Natália Gaudio (BRA)	Carolina Garcia (BRA)	Lina Dussan (COL)
Clubs	Natália Gaudio (BRA)	Valeska Gonzalez (CHI)	Simone Luiz (BRA)
Ball	Natália Gaudio (BRA)	Valeska Gonzalez (CHI)	Melissa Pérez (ECU)
