= Simone Luiz =

Brazilian rhythmic gymnast

- Born: 30 April 1992 (age 34) Toledo, Paraná

Gymnastics career
- Discipline: Rhythmic gymnastics
- Country represented: Brazil; (2010-2018)
- Head coach: Camila Ferezin
Medal record
Pan American Championships
Silver medal – second place	2010 Guadalajara	Team
Silver medal – second place	2016 Merida	Group all-around
Silver medal – second place	2016 Merida	5 ribbons
Silver medal – second place	2016 Merida	6 clubs + 2 hoops
South American Championships
Gold medal – first place	2012 Cali	Ball
Gold medal – first place	2013 Santiago	Team
Gold medal – first place	2015 Cochabamba	Team
Gold medal – first place	2018 Melgar	Group all-around
Gold medal – first place	2018 Melgar	3 balls + 2 ropes
Silver medal – second place	2012 Cali	All-around
Silver medal – second place	2012 Cali	Hoop
Silver medal – second place	2012 Cali	Clubs
Silver medal – second place	2018 Melgar	5 hoops
Silver medal – second place	2015 Cochabamba	Hoop
Bronze medal – third place	2015 Cochabamba	Clubs
Bronze medal – third place	2012 Cali	Ribbon

Simone Luiz (born 30 April 1992) is a Brazilian individual rhythmic gymnast. She represents her nation at international competitions. She competed at world championships, including at the 2011 World Rhythmic Gymnastics Championships.
