= Beatriz Francisco =

Brazilian rhythmic gymnast

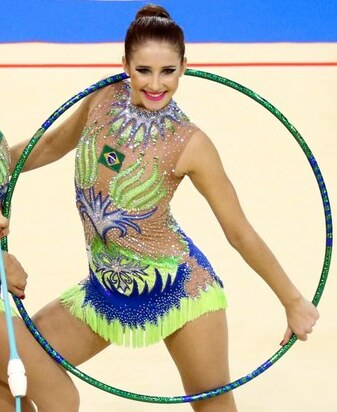
- Francisco at the 2015 Pan American Games

Personal information
- Born: 11 July 1996 (age 30)

Gymnastics career
- Discipline: Rhythmic gymnastics
- Country represented: Brazil; (2013-)
- Head coach: Camila Ferezin
Medal record
Representing Brazil
Rhythmic gymnastics
Event	1st	2nd	3rd
FIG World Cup	0	0	1
Total	0	0	1
Pan American Games
Gold medal – first place	2015 Toronto	Group all-around
Gold medal – first place	2015 Toronto	5 ribbons
Silver medal – second place	2015 Toronto	6 clubs + 2 hoops
Pan American Championships
Gold medal – first place	2014 Mississauga	Group all-around
Gold medal – first place	2014 Mississauga	10 clubs
Gold medal – first place	2014 Mississauga	3 balls + 2 ribbons
South American Championships
Gold medal – first place	2012 Cali	Group all-around
Gold medal – first place	2012 Cali	5 balls
Gold medal – first place	2012 Cali	3 ribbons + 2 hoops
Gold medal – first place	2013 Santiago	Group all-around
Gold medal – first place	2013 Santiago	10 clubs
Gold medal – first place	2013 Santiago	3 balls + 2 ribbons
Gold medal – first place	2019 Bogotá	Group all-around
Gold medal – first place	2019 Bogotá	5 balls
Gold medal – first place	2019 Bogotá	4 clubs + 3 hoops

Beatriz Pomini Francisco (born 11 July 1996) is a Brazilian group rhythmic gymnast. She represents her nation at international competitions. She competed at world championships, including at the 2015 World Rhythmic Gymnastics Championships.

In 2013, Beatriz Francisco and the other members of the Brazilian group — Eliane Sampaio, Bianca Mendonça, Debora Falda, Francielly Pereira and Gabrielle Silva — earned the bronze medal on the 3 balls + 2 ribbons routine at the Minsk stage of the 2013 Rhythmic Gymnastics World Cup Series. This was not only Brazil's but also Latin America's first medal at the Rhythmic Gymnastics World Cup series, and only the second time a country from the Americas earned a medal at the World Cup, after Canada's Mary Fuzesi earned the bronze medal on ribbon at the 1990 FIG World Cup Final.
