= Luciane Hammes =

Brazilian rhythmic gymnast (born 1988)

- Born: 7 August 1988 (age 38) Blumenau, Santa Catarina

Gymnastics career
- Discipline: Rhythmic gymnastics
- Country represented: Brazil (2005)
Medal record
Pan American Championships
Gold medal – first place	2005 Vitória	Groups all-around
Gold medal – first place	2005 Vitória	5 ribbons
Gold medal – first place	2005 Vitória	3 hoops + 4 clubs
South American Games
Gold medal – first place	2006 Buenos Aires	Group all-around
Gold medal – first place	2006 Buenos Aires	5 ribbons
Gold medal – first place	2006 Buenos Aires	3 hoops + 4 clubs
South American Championships
Gold medal – first place	2010 Cochabamba	Group all-around
Gold medal – first place	2010 Cochabamba	5 hoops
Gold medal – first place	2010 Cochabamba	3 ribbons + 2 ropes

Luciane Hammes (born 7 August 1988) is a Brazilian group rhythmic gymnast. She represents her nation at international competitions. She competed at world championships, including at the 2005 World Rhythmic Gymnastics Championships in Baku, Azerbaijan.
