= Drielly Neves Daltoe =

Brazilian rhythmic gymnast

- Born: 10 December 1993 (age 32) Vila Velha, Brazil

Gymnastics career
- Discipline: Rhythmic gymnastics
- Country represented: Brazil (2010-2016 (?))
- Head coach: Camila Ferezin
Medal record
Representing Brazil
Pan American Games
Gold medal – first place	2011 Guadalajara	Group all-around
Gold medal – first place	2011 Guadalajara	5 balls
Gold medal – first place	2011 Guadalajara	3 ribbons + 2 hoops
Pan American Championships
Silver medal – second place	2016 Merida	Group all-around
Silver medal – second place	2016 Merida	5 ribbons
Silver medal – second place	2016 Merida	6 clubs + 2 hoops
Bronze medal – third place	2010 Guadalajara	Team
South American Games
Gold medal – first place	2010 Medellín	Team
South American Championships
Gold medal – first place	2011 Maracaibo	Group all-around
Gold medal – first place	2011 Maracaibo	5 balls
Gold medal – first place	2011 Maracaibo	3 ribbons + 2 hoops

Drielly Neves Daltoe (born 10 December 1993) is a Brazilian group rhythmic gymnast. She represents her nation at international competitions. She competed at world championships, including at the 2011 World Rhythmic Gymnastics Championships.
