= Francielly Pereira =

Brazilian group rhythmic gymnast

Francielly Machado Pereira
- Born: 10 November 1995 (age 30)

Gymnastics career
- Discipline: Rhythmic gymnastics
- Country represented: Brazil (2014)
- Head coach: Camila Ferezin
Medal record
Representing Brazil
Rhythmic gymnastics
| Event | 1st | 2nd | 3rd |
|---|---|---|---|
| FIG World Cup | 0 | 0 | 1 |
| Total | 0 | 0 | 1 |
Pan American Championships
| Gold medal – first place | 2014 Mississauga | Group all-around |
| Gold medal – first place | 2014 Mississauga | 10 clubs |
| Gold medal – first place | 2014 Mississauga | 3 balls + 2 ribbons |
| Gold medal – first place | 2017 Daytona Beach | Group all-around |
| Gold medal – first place | 2017 Daytona Beach | 3 balls + 2 ropes |
| Silver medal – second place | 2017 Daytona Beach | 5 hoops |
South American Championships
| Gold medal – first place | 2013 Santiago | Group all-around |
| Gold medal – first place | 2013 Santiago | 10 clubs |
| Gold medal – first place | 2013 Santiago | 3 balls + 2 ribbons |

Francielly Machado Pereira (born 10 November 1995) is a Brazilian group rhythmic gymnast. She represents her nation at international competitions. She competed at world championships, including at the 2014 World Rhythmic Gymnastics Championships.

In 2013, Francielly Pereira and the other members of the Brazilian group — Beatriz Pomini, Bianca Mendonça, Debora Falda, Eliane Sampaio and Gabrielle Silva — earned the bronze medal on the 3 balls + 2 ribbons routine at the Minsk stage of the 2013 Rhythmic Gymnastics World Cup Series. This was not only Brazil's but also Latin America's first medal at the Rhythmic Gymnastics World Cup series, and only the second time a country from the Americas earned a medal at the World Cup, after Canada's Mary Fuzesi earned the bronze medal on ribbon at the 1990 FIG World Cup Final.

== See also ==
- List of Olympic rhythmic gymnasts for Brazil
