= Eduardo Carrillo =

Mexican American artist (1937–1997)

- Born: April 8, 1937; Santa Monica, California, United States
- Died: July 14, 1997 (aged 60); Tijuana, Baja California, Mexico
- Education: University of California, Los Angeles (BA 1962, MA 1964)
- Known for: El Grito, Califas: Chicano Art and Culture in California conference
- Notable work: El Grito, Las Tropicanas, Birth, Death and Regeneration
- Spouse(s): first wife, Shiela Carrillo, married to Alison Carrillo
- Children: Juliette Carrillo, Ruben Carrillo, Olivia Carrillo, Isabel Carrillo
- Awards: Copley Foundation Grant; 1966

Eduardo Carrillo (April 8, 1937 – July 14, 1997) was a Mexican American artist in El Movimiento who worked for the advancement of Chicano/a/x artists, culture, and civil rights. He was known for his paintings and murals which drew upon his extensive study of European and Mexican art and history. While his formative technical skill was rooted in his study and appreciation of western European Renaissance and Mannerists painters, his time spent living in Baja California also educated him in indigenous peoples art-making techniques and philosophies. The scope of his subject matter spanned surrealist-inspired landscapes, the intersection of Mexican history and myth and Chicano cultural identity, figurative and portrait paintings, traditional landscapes, and still lifes. In 1982, at a time in history when Chicano culture had been engaged with cultural reclamation and identification for over a decade, Carrillo organized the groundbreaking conference Califas: Chicano Art and Culture in California, which brought together artists, cultural workers, art historians, and educators to look at the contributions of Chicano art from 1965 to 1981.

== Biography ==
Eduardo Carrillo was born on April 8, 1937, in Santa Monica, California. He was the youngest of five children who grew up in Los Angeles. His artistic nature was greatly influenced by his father, a commercial artist, and his older brother Alex, who was an artist and teacher. After his father died of meningitis when Carrillo was five-years old, his maternal grandmother moved into his family home. Raised by his devout Catholic mother and grandmother, he was an altar boy at Saint Michael's church in South Los Angeles and educated in Catholic schools. His family maintained their close ties to his grandmother's home town of San Ignacio, Baja California Sur, to which they often returned.

In 1955, Carrillo attended Los Angeles City College, where he received an award from the art department, then the following year transferred to University of California, Los Angeles. His instructors included William Brice, Jack Hooper, Mary Holmes, and Stanton Macdonald-Wright. Stanton Macdonald-Wright recalled spending "whole afternoons with Eddie, as he was called, talking to him about paintings." Carrillo credited Brice with introducing him to the work of the great Mexican muralists, Diego Rivera, José Clemente Orozco, and David Alfaro Siqueiros. The 1957 exhibition German Expressionist Painting held at Pomona College, curated by Peter Selz, had a significant impact on L.A. artists. Two years later, in 1959, the Ceeje Gallery was founded. The majority of the artists the represented by Ceeje were young and enrolled in the masters' of arts program at UCLA. Many of Carrillo's fellow Ceeje artists such as Charles Garabedian, Roberto Chavez, Louie Lunetta, Lance Richbourg, Arleen Goldberg, Aron Goldberg, and Les Biller were influenced by the German expressionists Max Beckmann, Otto Dix, Ernst Ludwig Kirchner and Erich Heckel. Carrillo and his Cejee Gallery contemporaries were inspired by the possibilities of invented narratives, non-pictorial space and aggressive brushwork they found in the work of the German Expressionists, differing from the dominant influence of abstract expressionist and pop artists in America during this time.

UCLA instructor Mary Holmes was a supportive influence and lifelong friend of Carrillo and encourage him to pursue a grant to study in Spain. He continued working and in 1960 paid for his own travel to Spain. While studying abroad in Madrid's Círculo de Bellas Artes and at the Prado Museum, he analyzed works by Hieronymus Bosch, Diego Velázquez, El Greco, and other European Renaissance and mannerist painters. He practiced replicating these masters' oil painting glazing techniques in his efforts to understand their manipulation of light and its luminescence. In 1960, he created a copy of a likely follower of Bosch's The Temptation of Saint Anthony from c. 1500–1525.

Upon returning to the United States, Carrillo's paintings continued to show his interest in surrealistic spatial construction and are noted for a heightened stillness often associated with Giorgio de Chirico's work. In 1964, Carrillo painted the four evangelists in the style of El Greco for the pendentive roundels in the Mission of San Ignacio de Kadakamen, San Ignacio, Baja California Sur.

In 1966, he was awarded a grant from the Copley Foundation, San Diego to found a regional center for art in La Paz, Baja California. He and his first wife Sheila embarked on hiring craftsmen to teach traditional arts and crafts using indigenous materials and methods. A shop was established to sell the products and to provide economic support to the community.

Carrillo had a natural gift for teaching and was appointed as an assistant professor at San Fernando State College, Northridge in 1969. The following year he joined the faculty of Sacramento State College, then was recruited to the University of California, Santa Cruz, in 1972. During his tenure at UCSC teaching studio painting, watercolors, and drawing, Carrillo's classes also included group mural painting, hand-built ceramics for which he and his students personally dug local clay, and art history courses on Mexican art that included his extensive original research. As a teacher, he was known for his emotional and intellectual engagement with his students; his inspiration in their own work reverberated throughout and influenced their careers. He was connected to the founding of Oakes and Porter Colleges, and taught at University of California, Santa Cruz for twenty-five years until his death of cardiac arrest in 1997.

He was a leader in the Chicano mural painting movement in Los Angeles during the 1970s. Throughout his lifetime, he created a diverse array of paintings in oil and watercolor. His paintings are held in private collections and museums in the United States.

He was married twice and had four children. He died in 1997 in Tijuana, Baja California and was buried in his maternal ancestral homeland of San Ignacio.

The Eduardo Carrillo Gallery was dedicated in his honor at UCSC for senior student exhibitions.

Museo Eduardo Carrillo was created posthumously and is the only Artist-Endowed Foundation in the United States devoted to the work of a Mexican American artist.

== Career ==
=== El Centro de Arte Regional, La Paz, Baja California (1966) ===
Carrillo and his first wife, Shiela, moved to La Paz, Baja California in 1966. Here they founded a school that taught indigenous weaving, ceramics, and leatherwork. By creating a market of purchasable crafts, the work the school artists produced created an economic opportunity for the community. During this time, Carrillo learned ceramics from Daniel Zenteño, a Zapotec potter who also taught him about the indigenous cultures of Oaxaca.

=== Teaching (1969–1997) ===
- 1969–70: Appointed Assistant Professor of Art, San Fernando State College, Northridge, California
- 1970–72: Appointed Assistant Professor of Art, Sacramento State College (now California State University, Sacramento)
- 1972–97: Recruited as associate professor, tenured Professor, Art and Humanities, University of California, Santa Cruz

== Works ==
=== El Grito (1972) ===
The 44-foot long tile mural originally entitled, Father Hidalgo in front of the Church of Dolores also known as El Grito (The Cry) was composed of approximately 300 hand-made tiles each measuring 12 inches square by one inch thick, and weighing close to ten pounds each. These tiles were produced in a studio set up in Santa Cruz County. The mural, along with the Placita de Dolores, was dedicated in 1979 to commemorate the historic events of the morning of September 16, 1810. In front of the church in Dolores, Guanajuato, Father Miguel Hidalgo y Costilla gave a rousing speech to convince the Mexican population to fight against the Spanish colonial government; this led to the beginning of what became Mexico's independence movement. Father Hidalgo is located just to the right of center holding the standard of the Virgin of Guadelupe. His gaze is cast downward to the left where a cross symbol can be seen brightly illuminated in pale yellow indicating the movement from darkness to light and his belief in the divinity of this rebellion. Dark blue was used predominantly in the color scheme of the mural: it can be understood as an expression of the ability to transcend oppression and, conversely, inextricably connected to the oppressed people, for they and the open sky above are both depicted using the same blue. The active contrast of the orange hue of the street against the blue figures emphasized the energy leading away from the colonial church.

Carrillo's interpretation of the contemporary rebels in their urban environment is shown on the left, whereas a rural scene on the right was set against a field of corn and depicts farmers, gatherers, and indigenous people. In concert, the totality of the scene conveys the emergence of Mexicans from Spanish dominion and honors their ancestral right of independence.

=== Las Tropicanas (1972–73) ===
In 1972–73, Carrillo created Las Tropicanas, a monumental oil on panel (84 × 132 inches). In this work, the convergence of all that Carrillo had mastered was expressed.

In Las Tropicanas, the imprint of Bosch's use of disjointed and compressed space and the Mannerists use of forced perspective can be seen in Carrillo's composition composed of an amalgamation of subjects intersecting and converging: mythical figures, glowing tattooed figures, nude female figures rendered with naturalistic attention —one splayed on a balcony grasps and points an arrow from a bow — neon-hued skeletons stacked in a pyramid, a UFO that hovers in the upper right, an enormous rainbow-plumed hummingbird, an emerald green spinytail iguana coiled tightly in the center, modern-day buildings with cast-iron railings merged with Mesoamerican pyramids that abut a massive windowless structure detailed in "X" patterns, a menacing feline baring its fangs and poised to attack is threateningly just visible through a balcony trellis, a small Grecian vase is placed strategically at the base of a pillar, a tortoise and orb all co-exist. Bodies, architecture, animals, foreground, background, myth and reality are compressed in fantastical spatial balance. Carrillo referenced David Alfaro Siqueiros's "depth of space" as a major influence on Las Tropicanas.

The hummingbird can be seen as the reincarnation of Huītzilōpōchtli the Aztec god of sun and war. In Carrillo's composition, the perspective of the bird is rendered in a scale disproportionate to reality thus making it equivalent to the size of a large section of the night sky. This use of scale emphasizes the strength and power of the creature thereby intentionally invoking these same qualities associated with mythical warriors. Carrillo incorporated images derived from Mexico's pre-conquest art that he believed still held aesthetic power for Mexicans and their descendants in the United States. Carrillo stated:

I tried to introduce themes that seemed to be more Mexican than anything else. I had skeletons in this painting. Prior to this time, even way back in the 1960s, I was already painting skulls and so forth, but this was coming out of the Spanish tradition or the Flemish use of skulls. It was trying to bring together what I had learned in Spain and what I had learned in Mexico. It was a major step for me.

=== Birth, Death, and Regeneration (1976) ===
In 1976, Carrillo, whose work was deeply informed by the Mexican mural masters, especially David Alfaro Siqueiros, painted a mural in the Palomar Arcade (17 × 40 × 8 feet) entitled "Birth, Death, and Regeneration". The work was created in a narrow passageway that led from the back steps of the Santa Cruz County Jail to a quiet shopping arcade. In this route, Carrillo saw the potentially transformational nature of this path leading away from a structure that disproportionately incarcerated people of color to the spirit of something inherent to all and transcendent beyond. Carrillo described it as "the work in which I best synthesized the Spanish and Indian cultures."

With permission, and with friends and students from his university classes, the artist spent eight months painting every surface "out of pure love to humanity." Carrillo considered the space sacred. The mural depicted a crucified Indio, identified by a symbol on his solar plexus as the Maize God, a Mezoamerican symbol of the gift of life that dies in Winter. Above Indio, a dark cloud that framed a grimacing figure on a diagonal cross was Quetzacoatl: who sacrificed himself to give birth to the Maize God to feed the people.The space was filled with imagery of sacrifice, death, and rebirth.

The once unremarkable thoroughfare had been transformed into a color-infused and spiritually enlivened destination that through its art became a popular destination for musicians, artists, hippies, tourists, and the homeless. Without warning, the building's manager ordered the work destroyed; it was painted out overnight in 1979. As Shafira M. Goldman observed, "The loss was a cautionary tale documented in the history of mural paintings."

=== Califas: Chicano Art and Culture in California (1982) ===
In 1982, Carrillo launched Califas: Chicano Art and Culture in California, a conference to bring together educators, artists, scholars, and cultural workers to take stock of La Raza and El Movimiento after several decades of political awakening and action. Together with Philip Brookman, Tomàs Ybarra-Frausto, and Juventino Esparza, he assembled a visionary group for a multi-day symposium. Participants debated the Chicano Movement, in all its variety and manifestations, was very much alive and needed continued nurturance. Cultural reclamation was one of the driving forces of the movement. Carrillo along with his fellow artists Luis Valdez, Judith Baca, and Carmen Lomas Garza were already producing work that dealt with the recovery of identity. As a participating artist and scholar, Amalia Mesa-Baines explained, "We saw ourselves as offspring from an indigenous coalition, so our sense of belonging and origin went back symbolically." She credited Carrillo's vision for Califas for having included a strong role for women, which up to this point had not existed.

Over forty years later, the Califas Legacy Project continues its work focusing on the art and ideas of our region's Chicano/a/x and Latinx creative leaders, the elders in the movement, and the next generation of artists.
