= Museo Eduardo Carrillo =

- Established: 2001
- Location: Online
- Type: Art Museum
- Founder: Alison Carrillo
- Director: Nicole Rudolph-Vallerga (Previous Director Betsy Andersen)
- Owner: Alison Carrillo
- Website: http://www.museoeduardocarrillo.org

Museo Eduardo Carrillo is an Artist Endowed Foundation in the United States, devoted to the work of Mexican-American artist Eduardo Carrillo. Museo aims to share Carrillo's legacy through online exhibitions, collaborations, publications, etc.

It is one of nine organisations involved in the Califas Legacy Project, initiated by Carrillo himself in 1982. The project showcases the work of Latinx and Chicanx artists in Monterey Bay. Museo also awards the annual Eduardo Carrillo Scholarship, which aims to help artists refine their skills in painting, sculpture, and drawing. Since 1997, the scholarship has been awarded to more than 300 students from UC Santa Cruz.

Eduardo Carrillo: A Life of Engagement, an award-winning biographical documentary film by Chilean director Pedro Pablo Celedón, was released in 2015 to highlight the artist's life. The documentary examines Carrillo's life trajectory from Los Angeles, California, and explores his connection to Baja California, Mexico, his ancestral homeland. In 2018, an exhibition of his artwork, titled Testament of the Spirit, was held at the Crocker Art Museum in California.
