= Topographical tradition =

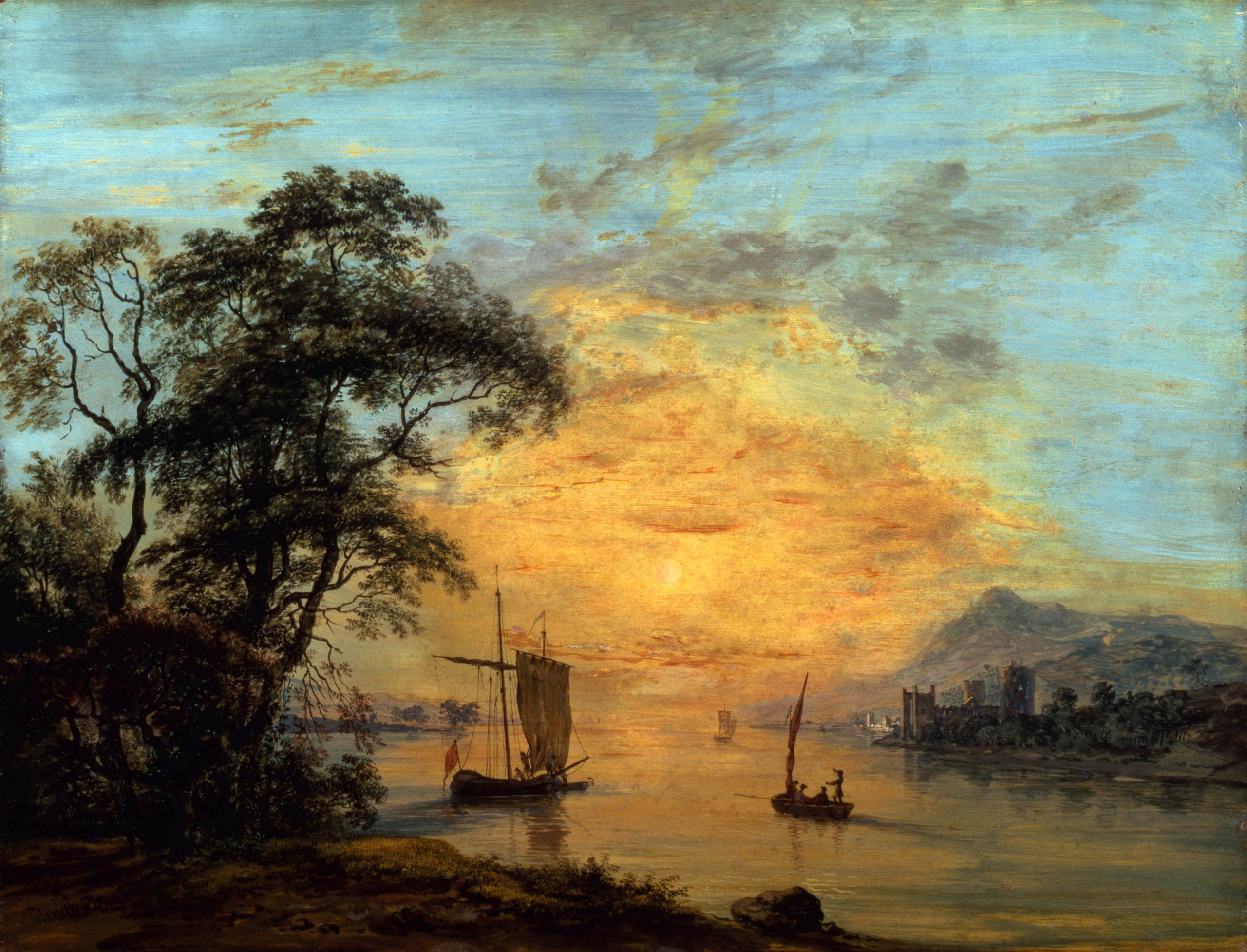
A Welsh Sunset River Landscape by Paul Sandby, oil on panel (c. 1775-1800)

The topographical tradition describes a long-established tradition of painting largely or entirely concerned with specific places on the earth and their topography.

In his article "The Topographical Tradition", Bruce MacEvoy states that the topographical tradition is rooted in 18th-century British watercolour painting intended to serve practical as well as aesthetic purposes: "At the beginning of the 18th century, the topographical watercoulor was primarily used as an objective record of an actual place in an era before photography."

== See also ==
- Landscape art
- Veduta
