= Andriely Cichovicz =

Brazilian rhythmic gymnast (born 2010)

- Full name: Andriely Letícia Cichovicz
- Born: November 8, 2010 (age 15) Chapecó

Gymnastics career
- Discipline: Rhythmic gymnastics
- Country represented: Brazil (2023–)
- Club: La Bella
- Head coach: Camila Ferezin
- Former coach: Juliana Coradine
- Choreographer: Bruna Martins
Medal record
Rhythmic gymnastics
Representing Brazil
South American Championships
Gold medal – first place	2026 Asunción	Group All-Around
Gold medal – first place	2026 Asunción	5 Balls
Gold medal – first place	2026 Asunción	3 Hoops + 4 Clubs
Gold medal – first place	2026 Asunción	All-Around Team
Junior World Championships
Silver medal – second place	2025 Sofia	All-around
Silver medal – second place	2025 Sofia	5 Hoops
Junior Pan American Championships
Gold medal – first place	2024 Ciudad de Guatemala	Group All-Around
Gold medal – first place	2024 Ciudad de Guatemala	5 Hoops
Gold medal – first place	2024 Ciudad de Guatemala	10 Clubs
Gold medal – first place	2025 Asunción	Group All-Around
Silver medal – second place	2025 Asunción	5 Hoops
Silver medal – second place	2025 Asunción	10 Clubs
Junior Pan American Games
Gold medal – first place	2025 Asunción	5 Hoops
Bronze medal – third place	2025 Asunción	Group All-around
Bronze medal – third place	2025 Asunción	10 Clubs
Gymnasiades
Gold medal – first place	Bahrain 2024	All-around
Gold medal – first place	Bahrain 2024	10 Clubs
Silver medal – second place	Bahrain 2024	5 Hoops
Junior South American Championships
Gold medal – first place	2024 Aracaju	Group All-Around
Gold medal – first place	2024 Aracaju	5 Hoops
Gold medal – first place	2024 Aracaju	10 Clubs
Gold medal – first place	2024 Aracaju	All-Around Team

Andriely Letícia Cichovicz (born 8 November 2010) is a Brazilian rhythmic gymnast. She represents her country in international competitions.

== Career ==
Cichovicz debuted nationally in 2021 when she competed at the Brazilian Championships in the children category, doing so again the following year.

=== Junior ===
In 2023 she became a junior and, after competing at nationals in April, was scouted for a period of trainings at the national centre to enter the national team.

In early June 2024 it was announced she was selected for the Brazilian junior group, trained by Juliana Coradine, that was going to compete at the Pan American Championships in Guatemala City. There she won gold in the All-Around, with 5 hoops and with 5 pair of clubs along Júlia Colere, Luiza Miranda, Alice Neves, Giovana Parra and Clara Pereira. In October she participated in a stage with renowned trainer, and Olympic medalist, Yulia Raskina in preparation for the Gymnasiade and the South American Championships. In late October her and her teammates competed at the Gymnasiade in Bahrain, winning gold in the All-Around ahead of Ukraine and Hungary. In December she won gold overall, in teams and in the two finals at the Junior South American Championships in Aracaju.

In May 2025 she made her debut at the Junior Pan American Championships in Asunción along Júlia Colere, Clara Pereira, Amanda Manente and Alice Neves, winning gold in the All-Around and silver in the two event finals. Then she was named into the five group gymnasts that will compete at the 3rd Junior World Championships in Sofia. There the group won silver in the Group All-Around and with 5 hoops, the first medals for Brazil in a World Championships at either junior and senior level. In late December it was revealed that she was called up to integrate the Brazilian senior group.

=== Senior ===
She started competing as a senior in 2026 as a part of national reserve group. In June, Andriely and her teammates (Bárbara Galvão, Maria Moraes, Rhayane Ferreira, Victória Borges, Marianne Giovacchini) competed at the 2026 South American Championships in Asunción, Paraguay. They won gold medal in all-around competition.
