= Luiza Miranda =

Brazilian rhythmic gymnast (born 2010)

- Full name: Luiza Miranda Ocampos
- Born: 2010 (age 15–16) Londrina

Gymnastics career
- Discipline: Rhythmic gymnastics
- Country represented: Brazil (2023–)
- Club: UNOPAR
- Head coach: Juliana Coradine
Medal record
Rhythmic gymnastics
Representing Brazil
Junior Pan American Championships
| Gold medal – first place | 2024 Ciudad de Guatemala | Group All-Around |
| Gold medal – first place | 2024 Ciudad de Guatemala | 5 Hoops |
| Gold medal – first place | 2024 Ciudad de Guatemala | 10 Clubs |

Luiza Miranda Ocampos (born 2010) is a Brazilian rhythmic gymnast. She represents her country in international competitions.

== Career ==
Miranda debuted nationally in 2021 when she competed at the Brazilian Championships in the children category, doing so again the following year. In 2023 she became a junior and, after competing at nationals in April, was scouted for a period of trainings at the national centre to enter the national team.

In 2024 it was announced she was selected for the Brazilian junior group, trained by Juliana Coradine, that was going to compete at the Pan American Championships in Guatemala City. There she won gold in the All-Around, with 5 hoops and with 5 pair of clubs along Andriely Cichovicz, Júlia Colere, Alice Neves, Giovana Parra and Clara Pereira. In October she participated in a stage with renowned trainer, and Olympic medalist, Yulia Raskina in preparation for the Gymnasiade and the South American Championships.
