= Júlia Colere =

Brazilian rhythmic gymnast (born 2010)

- Full name: Júlia Anny Colere Da Cruz
- Born: 7 September 2010 (age 16) Bridgeport, Connecticut

Gymnastics career
- Discipline: Rhythmic gymnastics
- Country represented: Brazil; (2023–)
- Club: AGIR
- Head coach: Juliana Coradine
Medal record
Rhythmic gymnastics
Representing Brazil
Junior World Championships
Silver medal – second place	2025 Sofia	All-around
Silver medal – second place	2025 Sofia	5 Hoops
Junior Pan American Championships
Gold medal – first place	2024 Ciudad de Guatemala	Group All-Around
Gold medal – first place	2024 Ciudad de Guatemala	5 Hoops
Gold medal – first place	2024 Ciudad de Guatemala	10 Clubs
Gold medal – first place	2025 Asunción	Group All-Around
Silver medal – second place	2025 Asunción	5 Hoops
Silver medal – second place	2025 Asunción	10 Clubs
Junior Pan American Games
Gold medal – first place	2025 Asunción	5 Hoops
Bronze medal – third place	2025 Asunción	Group All-around
Bronze medal – third place	2025 Asunción	10 Clubs
Gymnasiades
Gold medal – first place	Bahrain 2024	All-around
Gold medal – first place	Bahrain 2024	10 Clubs
Silver medal – second place	Bahrain 2024	5 Hoops
Junior South American Championships
Gold medal – first place	2024 Aracaju	Group All-Around
Gold medal – first place	2024 Aracaju	5 Hoops
Gold medal – first place	2024 Aracaju	10 Clubs
Gold medal – first place	2024 Aracaju	All-Around Team

Júlia Anny Colere Da Cruz (born 7 September 2010) is a Brazilian rhythmic gymnast. She represents her country in international competitions.

== Career ==
Colere debuted nationally in 2021 when she competed at the Brazilian Championships in the children category, doing so again the following year. In 2023 she became a junior and, after competing at nationals in April, was scouted for a period of trainings at the national centre to enter the national team.

In 2024 it was announced she was selected for the Brazilian junior group, trained by Juliana Coradine, that was going to compete at the Pan American Championships in Guatemala City. There she won gold in the All-Around, with 5 hoops and with 5 pair of clubs along Andriely Cichovicz, Luiza Miranda, Alice Neves, Giovana Parra and Clara Pereira. In October she participated in a stage with trainer, and Olympic medalist, Yulia Raskina in preparation for the Gymnasiade and the South American Championships. In late October her and her teammates competed at the Gymnasiade in Bahrain, winning gold in the All-Around ahead of Ukraine and Hungary. In December she won gold overall, in teams and in the two finals at the Junior South American Championships in Aracaju.

In May 2025 she made her debut at the Junior Pan American Championships in Asunción along Andriely Cichovicz, Clara Pereira, Amanda Manente and Alice Neves, winning gold in the All-Around and silver in the two event finals. Then she was named into the five group gymnasts that will compete at the 3rd Junior World Championships in Sofia. There the group won silver in the Group All-Around and with 5 hoops, the first medals for Brazil in a World Championships at either junior and senior level.
