= Anna Filipp =

American rhythmic gymnast (born 2011)

- Nickname: Anya
- Born: 11 February 2011 (age 15) Dnipro, Ukraine

Gymnastics career
- Discipline: Rhythmic gymnastics
- Country represented: United States; (2025–)
- Training location: Santa Clarita, California
- Club: Burlo Gymnastics
- Head coach: Yenia Burlo
- Assistant coaches: Nastya Ivankova, Karina Lykhvar
Medal record
Representing United States
Rhythmic gymnastics
Junior World Championships
Silver medal – second place	2025 Sofia	Team
Junior Pan American Championships
Gold medal – first place	2025 Asunción	Team
Gold medal – first place	2026 Rio de Janeiro	Team
Gold medal – first place	2026 Rio de Janeiro	All-Around
Gold medal – first place	2026 Rio de Janeiro	Hoop
Gold medal – first place	2026 Rio de Janeiro	Ball
Silver medal – second place	2025 Asunción	Clubs
Silver medal – second place	2026 Rio de Janeiro	Clubs
Silver medal – second place	2026 Rio de Janeiro	Ribbon
Junior Pan American Games
Gold medal – first place	2025 Asunción	Clubs
Gold medal – first place	2025 Asunción	Ribbon
Silver medal – second place	2025 Asunción	All-around
Silver medal – second place	2025 Asunción	Hoop
Bronze medal – third place	2025 Asunción	Ball

Anna Filipp (born 11 February 2011) is an American rhythmic gymnast of Ukrainian descent. She represents the United States in international competitions.

== Personal life ==
Filipp took up the sport at age three, in 2014, after her mother encouraged her to try it. Her dream is to become an Olympic champion and to establish herself as an athlete. She has a sister named Lilianna. Filipp attends California Online PublicSchool.

== Biography ==
In her international debut, at the 2023 Miss Valentine in Tartu, Filipp won gold with ribbon among the pre-juniors born in 2011.

=== Junior ===
She became a junior in 2025, competing at the Aphrodite Cup along Josephine Weber, winning bronze overall in the 2011 age group. In April she took part in the Shining Star International Tournament in Tashkent, taking silver in teams as well as with ball and with bronze hoop. At the Elite Qualifier she won bronze in the junior category. In late May she was selected for the Pan American Championships in Asunción where she performed with hoop and ribbon, winning team gold with Natalie de la Rosa, Dawn Kim and Alicia Liu, and silver with clubs She was then named to represent USA at the 3rd Junior World Championships in Sofia. There she won an historical silver medal in teams with Natalie de la Rosa, Alicia Liu and the national group, being the first time the USA won a team medal and a silver medal at the World Championships among both juniors and seniors. In August she competed at the Junior Pan American Games in Asunción, winning silver in the All-Around. In apparatus finals, she won gold medals in clubs and ribbon and silver medal in hoop. A month later she took part in the AEON Cup along Rin Keys and Megan Chu, she finished 4th among juniors, won silver in the hoop final as well as bronze with ball and clubs, and Burlo Gymnastics took bronze in teams.

After returning from an injury she won the Elite qualifier among junior, and then was selected for the 2026 Pan American Championships in Rio de Janeiro. In Brazil she won gold in teams, along Nina Keys, Izabella Oleynik and Josephine Weber, in the All-Around, with hoop and with ball as well as silver with clubs and with ribbon.

== Competitive highlights ==
Year	Event	Team	AA	Hoop	Ball	Clubs	Ribb.
International
2026	Aeon Cup	2nd	2nd J				

== Routine music information ==
Year	Apparatus	Music title
2026	Hoop	The Sublime by Mattia Turzo
2026	Ball	New Day Will Rise by Yuval Raphael
2026	Clubs	
2026	Ribbon	Si j'avais su by Claudio Capéo
2025	Hoop	Where Angels Fear to Tread by Kirill Richter
2025	Ball	SOS by Dimash
2025	Clubs	Still Life by Adrian Berenguer
2025	Ribbon	Si j’avais su by Claudio Capéo
