= Alicia Liu (gymnast) =

American rhythmic gymnast (born 2010)

- Born: 27 June 2010 (age 16)

Gymnastics career
- Discipline: Rhythmic gymnastics
- Country represented: United States; (2023–)
- Club: Pacific Stars Rhythmic Academy
- Head coach: Svitlana Prokopova
Medal record
Representing United States
Rhythmic gymnastics
Junior World Championships
Silver medal – second place	2025 Sofia	Team
Junior Pan American Championships
Gold medal – first place	2024 Ciudad de Guatemala	Team
Gold medal – first place	2025 Asunción	Team
Bronze medal – third place	2025 Asunción	Ribbon

Alicia Liu (born 27 June 2010) is an American rhythmic gymnast. She represents the United States in international competitions.

== Career ==
Liu started rhythmic gymnastics at the age of 6.

=== Junior ===
She made her international debut in 2023, competing at the Miss Valentine tournament in Tartu, being 5th with hoop among the girls born in 2010.

In 2024 she took part in the Elite Qualifier in Naperville, finishing in 6th place. In June she was selected for the Pan American Championships in Guatemala City. There she won gold in teams along Natalie de la Rosa, Isabella Chong and Dawn Kim. Two weeks later she participated in the USA Championships in Minneapolis, being 6th with clubs, 5th in the All-Around and won bronze with hoop and with ball.

In February 2025 she won All-Around gold in the junior department at the Rhythmic Challenge and Invitational. The following month she won silver in teams and with ribbon as well as gold with hoop at the Gymnastik International in Schmiden. She then competed in the Aphrodite Cup, being 15th overall. In May she took part in the Portimão International Tournament, winning gold in teams, with ball and with ribbon. At the Elite Qualifier she was 4th in the junior category. In late May she was selected for the Pan American Championships in Asunción where she performed with hoop and ribbon, winning team gold with Natalie de la Rosa, Dawn Kim and Anna Filipp, and bronze with ribbon. She was then named to represent USA at the 3rd Junior World Championships performing with ribbon. There she qualified for the event final and helped Team USA won team silver, the first team medal won by the U.S. at rhythmic World Championships.

=== Senior ===
Liu became age eligible for senior competitions in 2026, debuting at the Miss Valentine tournament in Tartu. She was a part of the Team USA, which earned gold in team event.
