= Alexandria Kautzman =

American rhythmic gymnast (born 2005)

- Nickname: Sasha
- Born: November 22, 2005 (age 20) California

Gymnastics career
- Discipline: Rhythmic gymnastics
- Country represented: United States; (2019–)
- Club: California Rhythms
- Head coach: Tatyana Itkina
Medal record
Rhythmic gymnastics
Representing United States
Pan American Championships
Gold medal – first place	2022 Rio de Janeiro	Team
Gold medal – first place	2022 Rio de Janeiro	Ball
Silver medal – second place	2022 Rio de Janeiro	Clubs
Silver medal – second place	2023 Guadalajara	Team
Silver medal – second place	2023 Guadalajara	Clubs
Silver medal – second place	2024 Ciudad de Guatemala	Team
Bronze medal – third place	2021 Rio de Janeiro	Team
Bronze medal – third place	2021 Rio de Janeiro	Ball
Bronze medal – third place	2023 Guadalajara	Ball
Event	1st	2nd	3rd
Grand Prix	0	0	1
Total	0	0	1

Alexandria Kautzman (born November 22, 2005) is an American rhythmic gymnast. She won gold with ball at the 2022 Pan American Championships.

== Gymnastics career ==
=== Junior ===
Kautzman took up gymnastics in 2014.

She joined the junior national team in 2019 after winning all-around at the Elite Qualifier in Lake Placid. At the USA Gymnastics Championships in June that year, she was third in the junior all-around. She was selected to represent the United States at the inaugural Junior World Championships in Moscow along with Victoria Kobelev, Jenna Zhao and the junior group. She competed with rope and ball, finishing 25th and 17th with the apparatuses and contributing to the United States team's 20th place finish.

At the 2020 Rhythmic Challenge, the first national competition of the year, Kautzman won gold in rope and ball, and silver in the all-around. The 2020 season was curtailed by the COVID-19 pandemic.

=== Senior ===
==== 2021 ====
Kautzman competed as a senior for the first time at the 2021 Rhythmic Challenge, where she won bronze in hoop and clubs, and was fifth all-around. At the Pan American Championships in Rio de Janeiro, she took eighth place in the all-around, bronze with ball, 16th in ribbon, and fourth in hoop and clubs. She contributed to the United States' team bronze, alongside teammates Lennox Hopkins Wilkins and Victoria Kobelev. At the USA Gymnastics Championships, she was fourth in all-around and hoop and sixth with ball. She was an alternate for the 2021 World Championships team.

==== 2022 ====
She took part in the World Cups in Tashkent - where she placed ninth in the all-around, 11th with hoop, seventh with ball, 16th with clubs and eighth with ribbon - and Pesaro - placing 17th in the all-around, 21st with hoop, 11th with ball, 17th with clubs and ninth with ribbon.

==== 2023 ====
Kautzman competed in the World Cups in Sofia - 25th in the All-Around, 34th with hoop, 26th with ball, 16th with clubs and 29th with ribbon - and Tashkent - 13th in the all-around, 11th with hoop, eighth with ball, 18th with clubs and 15th with ribbon. In April at the Thiais Grand Prix in France, Kautzman won bronze with clubs, behind silver medalist Fanni Pigniczki, and was fifth all-around. In June she competed at the Pan American Championships in Guadalajara, winning team silver, clubs silver, bronze with ball, and taking 4th all-around.

==== 2024 ====
She competed at the Pan American Championships in Guatemala City and won silver medal in team competition alongside Jaelyn Chin, Megan Chu and Rin Keys.

==== Personal life ====
Kautzman currently attends Northwestern University as an Economics and International Relations Major. Her favorite apparatus is all of them. Her younger sister Mischa was also a gymnast. In her free time her hobbies are drawing, shopping, and hanging out with her friend Julia Wolfson :).

== Routine music information ==
Year	Apparatus	Music Title
2024	Hoop	Sail by AWOLNATION
2024	Ball	La boxeuse amoureuse by Arthur H
2024	Clubs	Americano by Lady Gaga
2024	Ribbon	Seven Devils by Florence + the Machine
2023	Hoop	Nureyev (From "The White Crow" Soundtrack) by Lisa Batiashvili & Dudana Mazmanishvili
2023	Ball	La Malagueña by Gaby Moreno
2023	Clubs	Baby Outlaw by Elle King
2023	Ribbon	Seven Devils by Florence + the Machine
2022	Hoop	Desert Rose by Sting
2022	Ball	La Malagueña by Gaby Moreno
2022	Clubs	Survive / Brothers in Arms by Junkie XL
2022	Ribbon	Eye Of The Tiger by Tommee Proffit feat. FJØRA
2021	Hoop	New World Concerto by Maksim & Royal Philharmonic Orchestra
2021	Ball	Arrival of the Birds by The Cinematic Orchestra
2021	Clubs	ANOTHER LEVEL by On the Larceny
2021	Ribbon	Eye Of The Tiger by Tommee Proffit feat. FJØRA
