= Jimena Dominguez =

Venezuelan rhythmic gymnast (born 2009)

- Full name: Jimena Eugenia Dominguez Martinez
- Born: 25 September 2009 (age 17) Miranda

Gymnastics career
- Discipline: Rhythmic gymnastics
- Country represented: Venezuela; (2022-)
- Club: Miami Rhythmic Gymnastics Club
- Gym: Rhythmic Art
- Head coach: Elena Nikolashkina
Medal record
Rhythmic gymnastics
Representing Venezuela
Central American and Caribbean Games
Silver medal – second place	2026 Santo Domingo	Team
South American Gymnastics Championships
Gold medal – first place	2025 Cochabamba	All-Around
Bronze medal – third place	2025 Cochabamba	Team
Bronze medal – third place	2025 Cochabamba	All-Around Team
Junior South American Championships
Gold medal – first place	2023 Asunción	Hoop
Gold medal – first place	2023 Asunción	Clubs
Gold medal – first place	2023 Asunción	Ribbon
Gold medal – first place	2024 Aracaju	All-Around
Gold medal – first place	2024 Aracaju	Hoop
Gold medal – first place	2024 Aracaju	Ball
Gold medal – first place	2024 Aracaju	Clubs
Silver medal – second place	2024 Aracaju	Ribbon
Silver medal – second place	2024 Aracaju	Team
Bronze medal – third place	2022 Paipa	Team
Bronze medal – third place	2023 Asunción	Team
Bronze medal – third place	2023 Asunción	Ball
Bronze medal – third place	2023 Asunción	All-around team
Junior Pan American Championships
Bronze medal – third place	2024 Ciudad de Guatemala	Ribbon
Bolivarian Games
Gold medal – first place	2025 Peru	Hoop
Gold medal – first place	2025 Peru	Ball
Gold medal – first place	2025 Peru	Clubs
Gold medal – first place	2025 Peru	Ribbon
Silver medal – second place	2025 Peru	Team
Silver medal – second place	2025 Peru	All-Around

Jimena Eugenia Dominguez Martinez (born 25 September 2009) is a Venezuelan rhythmic gymnast. She represents her country at international level.

== Career ==
Jimena took up the sport at age 5.

2022

In July 2022 she competed in the Junior Pan American Championships in Rio de Janeiro, taking 11th place in the All-Around, 11th with hoop, 16th with ball, 20th with clubs. In November of the same year she won bronze in teams along Maria Victoria Escobar and Gabriela Rodríguez at the South American Championships in Paipa.

2023

In 2023 she took part in the Pan American Championships in Guadalajara, being 6th in teams, 8th in the All-Around and 7th with hoop. In July she was selected for the Junior World Championships in Cluj-Napoca, taking 34th place with hoop, 49th with ball, 43rd with clubs and 37th with ribbon. In November Dominguez won bronze in teams (with Luciana Caraballo and Samantha Rojas) and with ball, as well as gold with hoop, clubs and ribbon, at the Junior South American Championships in Asunción.

2024

In 2024 she competed at the Pan American Championships in Guatemala City, she was 8th in the All-Around, 4th with hoop, 5th with clubs 5th in teams and won bronze in the ribbon final.

In December 2024 she participated in the 2024 Junior South American Rhythmic Gymnastics Championships, in Aracaju, Brazil, winning a historic gold medal in the all-around, as well as 3 more gold medals in the hoop, ball and clubs, finals and a silver in the ribbon final.

2025

In June 2025, she participated in the 2025 Pan American Championships in Asunción, finishing 6th in the all-around, 8th in clubs and ribbon. In July, she participated in Milan World Cup, finishing 47th in the All-Around. The next month in August, she made her World Championships debut in Rio de Janeiro, finishing 58th in the All-Around.

In September, she participated in the 2025 South American Rhythmic Gymnastics Championships, in Cochabamba, Bolivia, winning a historic gold medal in the All-Around, being the first Venezuelan gymnast to do so. She won a bronze medal in both the hoop and clubs finals, and placed 4th in the ball and 5th in ribbon.

=== 2026 ===
In February 2026, she took part to the international tournament Miss Valentine in Tartu, where she got into clubs final finishing in 7th place. In March she competed in the Marbella Grand Prix, finishing 23rd in the all-around. In the same month, she participated to the World Cup stage in Sofia, reaching 62nd place in the all-around. In April she participated in the Koop Cup in Markham, finishing 5th in the all-around and winning a bronze medal in the hoop final.

At the 2026 Pan American Championships, held in June in Rio de Janeiro, she finished 7th in the all-around. She qualified for hoop, clubs and ribbon finals, finishing respectively in 7th, 7th and 5th place; additionally, she placed 6th in the team ranking together with teammates Alejandra Montilla and Luciana Caraballo.

At the 2026 Central American and Caribbean Games in Santo Domingo, she placed 7th in the all-around; she qualified for hoop, clubs and ribbon finals, finishing 4th, 3rd and 7th respectively.

In August she took part to the World Championships in Frankfurt am Main, finishing 76th in the all-around, with hoop being her best apparatus.

== Routine music information ==
Year	Apparatus	Music title
2026	Hoop	Vandals by Jo Blankenburg
2026	Ball	
2026	Clubs	
2026	Ribbon	La Copa de la Vida by Ricky Martin
2025	Hoop	Vandals by Jo Blankenburg
2025	Ball	
2025	Clubs	
2025	Ribbon	La Copa de la Vida by Ricky Martin
2024	Hoop	A Kiss by Phonograph Sympho-Jazz
2024	Ball	Quizás, Quizás, Quizás by Lucrecia
2024	Clubs	
2024	Ribbon	La Copa de la Vida by Ricky Martin
2023	Hoop	A Kiss by Phonograph Sympho-Jazz
2023	Ball	Quizás, Quizás, Quizás by Lucrecia
2023	Clubs	On the Floor by Jennifer Lopez, feat. Pitbull
2023	Ribbon	Havana (from Havana) by Linda Eder / Happy Brasilia by James Last
