= 2023 Junior South American Rhythmic Gymnastics Championships =

Rhythmic Gymnastics competition

- Venue: Gymnastics Pavillon Secretaría Nacional de Deportes' Complex
- Location: Asunción, Paraguay
- Start date: 27 November 2023
- End date: 04 December 2023

The 2023 Junior South American Rhythmic Gymnastics Championships were held in Asunción, Paraguay, from November 27 to December 4, 2023. The competition was organized by the Paraguayan Gymnastics Federation and approved by the International Gymnastics Federation.

== Medalists ==
Event	Gold	Silver	Bronze
Team all-around	Brazil; Fernanda Alvaz; Júlia Bessa; Keila Santos	Argentina; Livia Bustos; Camila Arce; Pilar Montenegro; Clara Squillari	Venezuela; Jimena Dominguez; Luciana Caraballo; Samantha Rojas
Individual all-around	Fernanda Alvaz (BRA)	Júlia Bessa (BRA)	Keila Santos (BRA)
Hoop	Jimena Dominguez (VEN)	Júlia Bessa (BRA)	Keila Santos (BRA)
Ball	Fernanda Alvaz (BRA)	Júlia Bessa (BRA)	Jimena Dominguez (VEN)
Clubs	Jimena Dominguez (VEN)	Keila Santos (BRA)	Fernanda Alvaz (BRA)
Ribbon	Jimena Dominguez (VEN)	Emiliana Vargas (COL)	Keila Santos (BRA)
Group all-around	Brazil	Argentina	Venezuela
Group 5 ropes	Brazil	Chile	Venezuela
Group 5 balls	Brazil	Chile	Argentina
All-around team	Brazil	Argentina	Venezuela

=== Age group ===
Event	Gold	Silver	Bronze
Team all-around	Brazil; Sarah Mourão; Alice Neves; Nicolle Zacchia	Chile; Isidora Gonzalez; Constanza Ortiz; Matilde Trivique	Argentina; Emma Ceballos; Paz Terreno; Federica Barria
Individual all-around	Sarah Mourão (BRA)	Alice Neves (BRA)	Emma Ceballos (ARG)
Ball	Isidora Gonzalez (CHI)	Alice Neves (BRA)	Sarah Mourão (BRA)
Clubs	Sarah Mourão (BRA)	Alice Neves (BRA)	Isidora Gonzalez (CHI)
Ribbon	Sarah Mourão (BRA)	Alice Neves (BRA)	Isidora Gonzalez (CHI)
