= Dawn Kim =

American rhythmic gymnast (born 2010)

- Born: 30 March 2010 (age 16)

Gymnastics career
- Discipline: Rhythmic gymnastics
- Country represented: United States (2023–)
- Club: Pacific Stars Rhythmic Academy
Medal record
Representing United States
Rhythmic gymnastics
Pacific Rim Championships
Gold medal – first place	2024 Cali	Team
Silver medal – second place	2024 Cali	All-Around
Silver medal – second place	2024 Cali	Ball
Silver medal – second place	2024 Cali	Ribbonl
Junior Pan American Championships
Gold medal – first place	2024 Ciudad de Guatemala	Team
Gold medal – first place	2024 Ciudad de Guatemala	Clubs
Gold medal – first place	2025 Asunción	Team
Silver medal – second place	2025 Asunción	All-Around
Bronze medal – third place	2025 Asunción	Ball

Dawn Kim (born 30 March 2010) is an American rhythmic gymnast. She represents the United States in international competitions.

== Career ==
Dawn entered the national team in 2023, her first year as a junior. In February she competed at Miss Valentine in Tartu, she finished 8th among the gymnasts born in 2010 and won silver with ball. At the USA Gymnastics Championships in Tulsa she was 24th in the All-Around.

In 2024 she took part in the Aphrodite Cup in Athens, being 37th overall. In late April she was selected for the Pacific Rim in Cali, there she won gold in the team competition, along Jaelyn Chin, Isabella Chong, Megan Chu, Yana Golovan and Natalie de la Rosa, silver in the All-Around, with ball and with ribbon. A week later she was 5th overall at the Gdynia Rhythmic Stars tournament. She was then selected for the Pan American Championships in Guatemala City, there she was the gold medalist in teams, and with clubs. At nationals she was 7th in the All-Around and won silver with ribbon.

In 2025 she won bronze at the USA's championships, behind Alicia Liu and Natalie de la Rosa. A month later she took 11th place among those born in 2010 at the Aphrodite Cup. At the Pan American Championships she won gold in teams, silver in the All-Around and bronze with ball.
