= Rin Keys =

American rhythmic gymnast (born 2008)

- Full name: Rin Alessia Keys
- Born: 23 September 2008 (age 18) Tokyo, Japan
- Relatives: Nina Keys

Gymnastics career
- Discipline: Rhythmic gymnastics
- Country represented: United States; (2021–present)
- Club: Burlo Gymnastics
- Head coach: Yenia Burlo
Medal record
Representing United States
Rhythmic gymnastics
Event	1st	2nd	3rd
World Championships	0	1	0
FIG World Cup	0	2	1
FIG World Challenge Cup	0	5	0
Total	0	8	1
World Championships
Silver medal – second place	2025 Rio de Janeiro	Ball
Pan American Championships
Gold medal – first place	2024 Ciudad de Guatemala	Clubs
Gold medal – first place	2025 Asunción	Team
Gold medal – first place	2025 Asunción	All-Around
Gold medal – first place	2025 Asunción	Ball
Gold medal – first place	2025 Asunción	Clubs
Silver medal – second place	2024 Ciudad de Guatemala	Team
Silver medal – second place	2024 Ciudad de Guatemala	All-Around
Silver medal – second place	2024 Ciudad de Guatemala	Ball
Silver medal – second place	2025 Asunción	Ribbon
Junior World Championships
Bronze medal – third place	2023 Cluj-Napoca	Clubs
Junior Pan American Championships
Gold medal – first place	2021 Guatemala City	Team
Gold medal – first place	2022 Rio de Janeiro	Team
Gold medal – first place	2022 Rio de Janeiro	All-Around
Gold medal – first place	2022 Rio de Janeiro	Ball
Gold medal – first place	2022 Rio de Janeiro	Ribbon
Gold medal – first place	2023 Guadalajara	Team
Gold medal – first place	2023 Guadalajara	All-Around
Gold medal – first place	2023 Guadalajara	Hoop
Gold medal – first place	2023 Guadalajara	Ball
Silver medal – second place	2022 Rio de Janeiro	Hoop
Silver medal – second place	2023 Guadalajara	Clubs
Bronze medal – third place	2021 Guatemala City	All-Around
Bronze medal – third place	2021 Guatemala City	Ball
Bronze medal – third place	2021 Guatemala City	Clubs
Bronze medal – third place	2023 Guadalajara	Ribbon

Rin Alessia Keys (born 23 September 2008) is an American rhythmic gymnast. She is the Pan American champion (2025 in team, all-around, ball and clubs and 2024 in clubs) and the 2025 World ball silver medalist, where she was the first gymnast from the Americas to win an individual medal at the senior World championships. As a junior, she won a bronze medal in clubs at the 2023 Junior World Championships, becoming the first American to win a World Championships medal.

At the national level, she is a three-time (2024-2026) USA national all-around champion and 2023 USA junior national all-around champion.

== Personal life ==
Keys was born in Tokyo, Japan. At age six, her family moved to Los Angeles, where she started training at the Burlo Gymnastics Club. Her younger sister Nina is also a rhythmic gymnast and a member of the USA national team.

== Career ==
=== Junior ===
In 2021, Keys joined the junior national team. She competed at the 2021 Junior Pan American Championships, where she won team gold. Individually, she won bronze in the all-around as well as with ball and with clubs.

The following year, at the Pan American Championships in Rio de Janeiro, she won another team gold and gold in the junior all-around. In the apparatus finals, she won two more golds with ball and with ribbon as well as silver with hoop. At the national level, she was the all-around junior silver medalist.

In 2023, Keys became the all-around junior national champion. At the Pan American Championships in Guadalajara in June, she won a third team gold and second consecutive gold in the junior all-around. She won two more golds in the apparatus finals, with hoop and with ball, in addition to silver with clubs and bronze with ribbon. In July, she was selected for the Junior World Championships in Cluj-Napoca along with Megan Chu and the junior group. She won an historic bronze medal in the clubs final, becoming the first rhythmic gymnast from the United States, or any country in the Americas, to win a World Championships medal at either the junior or senior level.

=== Senior ===
==== 2024 ====
In 2024, she began competing in the senior category. She made her international debut in March at her first World Cup in Palaio Faliro, Greece, where she placed 7th in the all-around and qualified for two finals. In the finals, she finished 4th with the ball and 6th with the clubs. In April, she competed at the World Cup in Tashkent, Uzbekistan, where she placed 12th in all-around but did not qualify for any finals.

In June, she competed at the 2024 Pan American Championships and won a silver medal in the team competition together with Jaelyn Chin, Megan Chu and Alexandria Kautzman. She also won a silver medal in the all-around behind Bárbara Domingos from Brazil. In the apparatus finals, she won gold with clubs and silver with ball, and she placed 4th in the hoop and ribbon finals. She won the all-around at the 2024 USA National Championships, as well as gold in hoop, silver in ribbon and bronze in clubs. At the end of September, Keys, along with her teammates Megan Chu and Natalia de la Rosa, participated in the international club competition Aeon Cup in Japan, where they won a historic gold medal ahead of the Ukrainian and Italian teams. She placed 5th in the all-around.

==== 2025 ====
In 2025, Keys competed at the Sofia World Cup in April and finished in 6th place in the all-around. In the ribbon final, she won the bronze medal behind Taisiia Onofriichuk and Liliana Lewinska, and she also took 6th place in the clubs and ball finals. Later in April, she competed at the Baku World Cup and took 9th place in the all-around. In the apparatus finals, she was 4th with hoop and 7th with clubs. On 9-11 May, she competed at the World Challenge Cup Portimão and won the silver medal in the all-around behind Alina Harnasko. She also won two additional silver medals in the clubs and ball finals.

At the 2025 Pan American Championships in June, she won gold in the all-around. She also won the gold medal in the team competition together with Megan Chu and three more individual medals in the apparatus finals: gold with ball and clubs and silver with ribbon. On June 20-22, Keys competed at the USA National Championships and won gold in the all-around. In July, she competed at the Milan World Cup, where she took 12th place in the all-around and advanced to the ribbon final, finishing 8th. On July 25-27, she competed at the Cluj-Napoca World Challenge Cup and finished 8th in the all-around. She won the silver medal in ribbon and took 7th place in the ball final.

In August, she made her World Championships debut in Rio de Janeiro, Brazil, where she took 6th place in all-around qualifications and qualified to three apparatus finals. She ended in 7th place in the all-around final, the best all-around Worlds finish for a U.S. athlete since Laura Zeng at the 2017 World Championships (6th). Together with Megan Chu and senior group, she finished in 12th place in the team competition. In the event finals, she won an historic silver medal in the ball final, the first-ever World medal won by gymnast from the Americas. She also finished 4th in the hoop final and 5th in the ribbon final. Later in the year, she competed at the Aeon Cup in Tokyo, with her teammates Megan Chu and Anna Filipp. They represented the Burlo/Pacific club, which won the bronze medal behind the Deriugina School and AIN2. In the senior all-around, Keys won a silver medal behind Taisiia Onofriichuk and ahead of Amalia Lică.

==== 2026 ====
In 2026, Keys again started her season competing at Sofia World Cup, where she took 11th place in the all-around. She was 5th in hoop and 4th in the clubs final. In April, she competed at Tashkent World Cup, finishing 4th in the all-around. She won silver medals in the ball and ribbon finals. On May 15-17, she competed at Portimão World Challenge Cup, taking 8th place in all-around. She won silver medal in hoop final behind Sofia Raffaeli and Hatice Gokce Emir. In June, she won the gold medal in the all-around at the USA National Championships, held in Tulsa, Oklahoma, for the third consecutive year. She also won two gold medals in ball and ribbon and silver in the clubs final. In July, she took 12th place in the all-around at the Milan World Cup and qualified to the ribbon final, finishing in 6th place.

In August, she was selected to represent the United States at the 2026 World Championships in Frankfurt, Germany, alongside Megan Chu and the senior group. She qualified for the all-around final, where she obtained better scores on each apparatus than she had in the qualifying round, and finished in 8th place. Later in the year, she competed at the Aeon Cup in Tokyo, with her teammates Megan Chu and Anna Filipp. They represented the Burlo/Pacific club, which won the silver medal behind Sky Grace.

== Achievements ==
- First American gymnast to win a medal at the World Championships at either the junior and senior level by winning bronze with clubs at the 2023 Junior World Championships.
- First American gymnast to win a medal (silver) in an individual apparatus final at the senior World Championships.

== Routine music information ==
Year	Apparatus	Music Title
2023	Hoop	Whole Lotta Love by Beth Hart
2023	Ball	Black Horse and the Cherry Tree by KT Tunstall
2023	Clubs	Days Pass by Adrian Berenguer
2023	Ribbon	Footloose by Kenny Loggins
2024	Hoop	Whole Lotta Love by Beth Hart
2024	Ball	Not About Angels by Birdy
2024	Clubs	Check it out by Oh the Larceny
2024	Ribbon	Theory of Light by Eternal Eclipse
2025	Hoop	Killer Game by FreshmanSound / Same Old Stories by Gothic Storm
2025	Ball	Somewhere Over the Rainbow by Joseph William Morgan, Shadow Royale
2025	Clubs	Scratch by Power-Haus
2025	Ribbon	Theory of Light by Eternal Eclipse
2026	Hoop	Killer Game by FreshmanSound / Same Old Stories by Gothic Storm
2026	Ball	Lose My Faith by Gold Brother
2026	Clubs	Scratch by Power-Haus
2026	Ribbon	Black Betty by Ram Jam

== Competitive highlights ==
(Team competitions in seniors are held only at the World Championships, Europeans and other Continental Games.)

International: Senior
Year	Event	AA	Team	Hoop	Ball	Clubs	Ribbon
2026	World Championships Frankfurt	8th	8th	21st (Q)	27th (Q)	4th	9th (Q)
2026	World Cup Milan	12th		24th (Q)	17th (Q)	11th (Q)	6th
2026	World Challenge Cup Portimao	8th		3rd	26th (Q)	7th	12th (Q)
2026	World Cup Tashkent	4th		4th	2nd	4th	2nd
2026	World Cup Sofia	11th		5th	30th (Q)	4th	10th (Q)
2025	Aeon Cup	2nd	3rd				
2025	World Championships Frankfurt	7th	12th	4th	2nd	21st (Q)	5th
2025	World Challenge Cup Cluj-Napoca	8th		14th (Q)	7th	17th (Q)	2nd
2025	World Cup Milan	12th		21st (Q)	17th (Q)	19th (Q)	8th
2025	Pan American Championships	1st	1st	4th	1st	1st	2nd
2025	World Challenge Cup Portimao	2nd		9th (Q)	2nd	2nd	4th
2025	World Cup Baku	9th		4th	10th (Q)	7th	11th (Q)
2025	World Cup Sofia	6th		43rd (Q)	6th	6th	3rd
2024	Aeon Cup	5th	1st				
2024	Pan American Championships	2nd	2nd	4th	2nd	1st	4th
2024	IT Gdynia Rhythmic Stars	3rd		2nd	1st	1st	1st
2024	World Cup Tashkent	12th		12th (Q)	13th (Q)	11th (Q)	15th (Q)
2024	World Cup Palaio Faliro	7th		27th (Q)	4th	6th	10th (Q)
International: Junior
Year	Event	AA	Team	Hoop	Ball	Clubs	Ribbon
2023	Aeon Cup	3rd	5th				
2023	Junior World Championships		11th	8th		3rd	
2023	Pan American Championships	1st	1st	1st	1st	2nd	3rd
2023	IT Gdynia Rhythmic Stars	2nd	3rd	4th	3rd		3rd
2023	IT Portimao			1st	1st		1st
2023	IT Sofia Cup	8th			6th	4th	
2022	Aeon Cup	2nd	3rd				
2022	Pan American Championships	1st	1st	2nd	1st		1st
2022	IT Portimao		2nd	2nd		1st	3rd
2022	IT Sofia Cup	3rd			2nd		4th
2021	Pan American Championships	3rd	1st	4th	3rd	3rd	
National: Senior
Year	Event	AA	Team	Hoop	Ball	Clubs	Ribbon
2026	USA National Championships	1st		5th	1st	2nd	1st
2025	USA National Championships	1st		1st	1st	1st	1st
2024	USA National Championships	1st		1st		3rd	2nd
National: Junior
Year	Event	AA	Team	Hoop	Ball	Clubs	Ribbon
2023	USA National Championships	1st		1st	1st	1st	4th
2022	USA National Championships	2nd		1st	1st	3rd	7th
Q = Qualifications (Did not advance to Event Final due to the 2 gymnast per country rule, only Top 8 highest score); WR = World Record; WD = Withdrew; NT = No Team Competition; OC = Out of Competition(competed but scores not counted for qualifications/results)
