= Alice Neves =

Brazilian rhythmic gymnast (born 2010)

Alice Neves de Medeiros
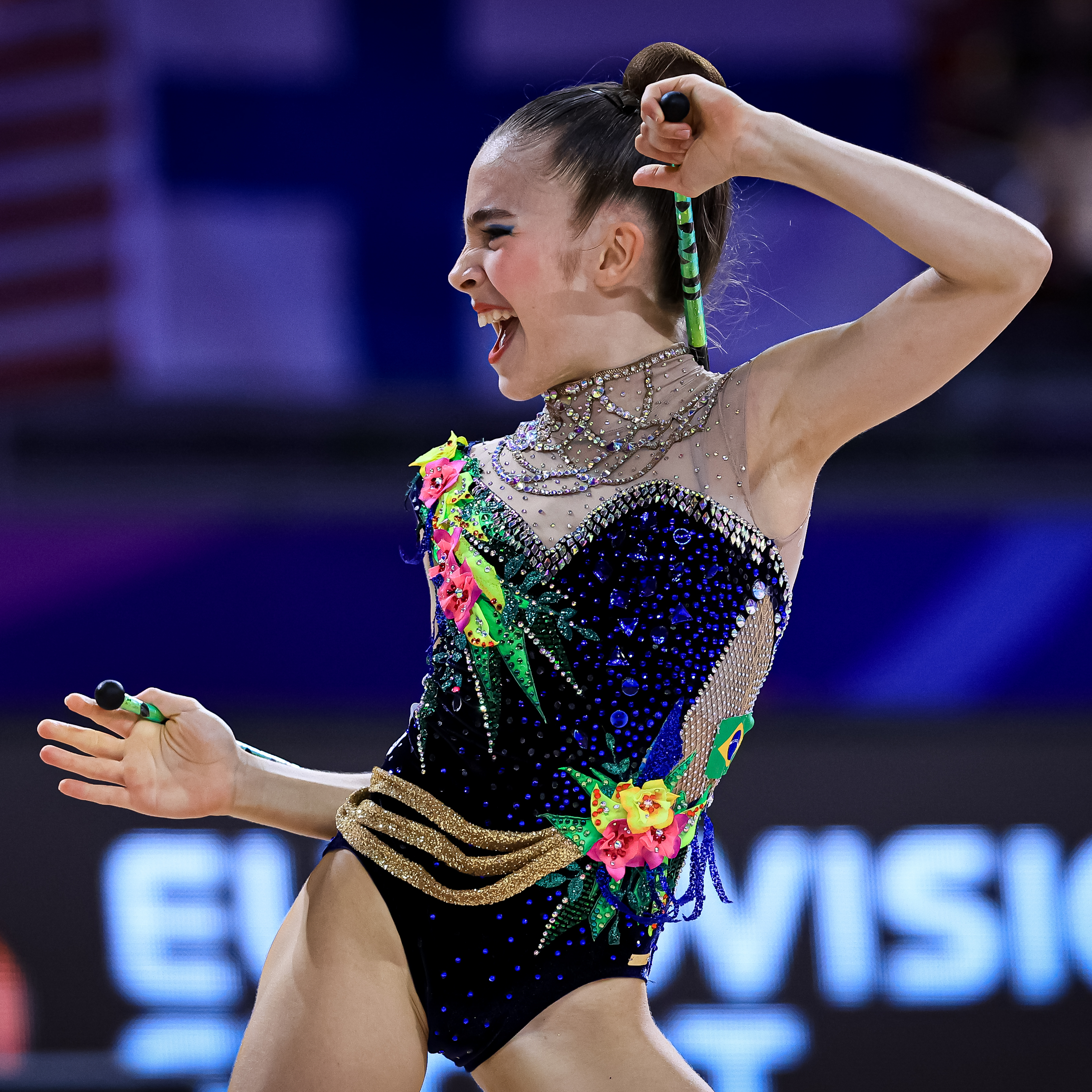

Personal information
- Full name: Alice Neves de Medeiros
- Born: 13 September 2010 (age 15) Recife

Gymnastics career
- Discipline: Rhythmic gymnastics
- Country represented: Brazil (2023–)
- Club: IFCgym - CCR
- Head coaches: Juliana Coradine, Fátima Coelho
Medal record
Rhythmic gymnastics
Representing Brazil
Junior World Championships
Silver medal – second place	2025 Sofia	Group All-Around
Silver medal – second place	2025 Sofia	5 Hoops
Junior Pan American Championships
Gold medal – first place	2025 Asunción	Group All-Around
Silver medal – second place	2025 Asunción	5 Hoops
Silver medal – second place	2025 Asunción	10 Clubs
Gold medal – first place	2024 Guatemala City	Group All-Around
Gold medal – first place	2024 Guatemala City	5 Hoops
Gold medal – first place	2024 Guatemala City	10 Clubs
Junior Pan American Games
Gold medal – first place	2025 Asunción	5 Hoops
Bronze medal – third place	2025 Asunción	Group All-around
Bronze medal – third place	2025 Asunción	10 Clubs
Gymnasiade
Gold medal – first place	2024 Bahrain	Group All-Around
Gold medal – first place	2024 Bahrain	10 Clubs
Silver medal – second place	2024 Bahrain	5 Hoops
Junior South American Championships
Gold medal – first place	2024 Aracaju	Group All-Around
Gold medal – first place	2024 Aracaju	5 Hoops
Gold medal – first place	2024 Aracaju	10 Clubs
Gold medal – first place	2024 Aracaju	Team All-Around
Silver medal – second place	2023 Asunción	Individual All-Around
Gold medal – first place	2022 Paipa	Individual All-Around

Alice Neves de Medeiros (born 13 September 2010) is a Brazilian rhythmic gymnast. She represents her country in international competitions.

== Career ==
Medeiros made her national debut in 2021, competing in the Brazilian Rhythmic Gymnastics Championships in the infant category (11 years). On that occasion, she became the Brazilian all-around champion and won four medals in the apparatus finals: gold in free hands, hoop, and clubs, and silver in ribbon. That same year, she also won a bronze medal at the Brazilian School Games (JEBs).

In 2022, she placed third at the Brazilian Championships and, representing Brazil, became the South American infant champion, winning gold in the all-around, hoop, and ribbon, and silver in free hands. She was also runner-up in the all-around and ball apparatus at the Brazilian School Games, and won team gold in the Série Ouro event representing the Pernambuco team, alongside gymnasts Bruna Jordão, Isabela Alcântara, and Gabriela Flexa.

At the end of 2022, Medeiros was invited to a training camp at the Brazilian Gymnastics Confederation’s national center, where she began to be closely monitored by the national coaching staff—a process that continued throughout 2023.

=== Junior ===
In 2023, she advanced to the junior category. She became national runner-up among 13-year-olds and earned a bronze medal in the hoop final. She also participated in an international training camp in Aruba alongside gymnast Sarah Mourão. That same year, she earned a bronze medal in the level II all-around and gold in both the hoop and ball finals at the Youth School Games, organized by the Brazilian Olympic Committee (COB). At the end of the year, she again represented Brazil at the South American Championships, where she was all-around runner-up and won silver in the ball, clubs, and ribbon finals.

In 2024, Medeiros was officially selected to join the Brazil junior group, coached by Juliana Coradine. The team won medals at all competitions they attended. That year, they became champions at the 2024 Pan American Rhythmic Gymnastics Championships, held in Guatemala City, alongside Andriely Cichovicz, Luiza Miranda, Júlia Colere, Giovana Parra, and Clara Pereira. In October, Medeiros took part in a training camp led by Olympic medalist Yulia Raskina, in preparation for the Gymnasiade and the 2024 Junior South American Rhythmic Gymnastics Championships. Later that month, she and her teammates competed at the Gymnasiade in Bahrain, winning gold in the group all-around, ahead of teams from Ukraine and Hungary. In December, she won gold in the all-around, team competition, and both apparatus finals at the 2024 Junior South American Rhythmic Gymnastics Championships in Aracaju.

In 2025, the Brazilian junior group was once again crowned champion at the 2025 Pan American Rhythmic Gymnastics Championships in Asunción, alongside Júlia Colere, Clara Pereira, Amanda Manente, and Andriely Cichovicz. Medeiros won gold in the group all-around and silver in both event finals. In June, the group achieved its greatest result to date: a historic medal at the 2025 Junior World Rhythmic Gymnastics Championships in Sofia. The team, composed of Alice, Andriely Cichovicz, Júlia Colere, Clara Pereira, and Amanda Manente, won silver in the group all-around and in the hoop final, marking the first time Brazil had ever reached the podium at a World Championships at both junior and senior levels.
