= Isabella Chong =

American rhythmic gymnast (born 2009)

- Nickname: Bella
- Born: April 25, 2009 (age 17) Pittsburgh, Pennsylvania, U.S.

Gymnastics career
- Discipline: Rhythmic gymnastics
- Country represented: United States (2021-)
- Club: Burlo Gymnastics
- Head coach: Jenya Tkachenko
- Assistant coach: Anastasiya Ivankova
Medal record
Representing United States
Rhythmic gymnastics
Pacific Rim Championships
Gold medal – first place	2024 Cali	Team
Gold medal – first place	2024 Cali	Hoop
Gold medal – first place	2024 Cali	Clubs
Pan American Championships
Gold medal – first place	2024 Ciudad de Guatemala	Team
Gold medal – first place	2024 Ciudad de Guatemala	Ball
Gold medal – first place	2024 Ciudad de Guatemala	Ribbon
Silver medal – second place	2024 Ciudad de Guatemala	All-Around
Silver medal – second place	2024 Ciudad de Guatemala	Ball

Isabella Chong (born April 25, 2009) is an American rhythmic gymnast. She represents her country in international competitions.

== Biography ==
Isabella took up rhythmic gymnastics after seeing a gymnast on a magazine. As a pre junior, in 2021, she competed at the Ritam Cup in Belgrade where she topped the All-Around.

A year later she again took part in the Ritam Cup, this time as a junior, but out of competition. In June 2022 she was 11th at the USA Rhythmic Championships. In 2023 she took 16th place in the Gdynia Rhythmic Stars tournament, at the USA Gymnastics Championships in Tulsa she was 6th in the All-Around, 8th with hoop and ribbon, 7th with ribbon and won bronze with ball.

In 2024 she took part in the Aphrodite Cup in Athens, being 5th with club, 6th with hoop and 8th in the All-Around. In late April she was selected for the Pacific Rim in Cali, there she won gold with hoop and clubs and in the team competition, along Jaelyn Chin, Natalie de la Rosa, Megan Chu, Yana Golovan and Dawn Kim. At the Gdynia Cup she took silver in the All-Around and with clubs. She was then selected for the Pan American Championships in Guatemala City, there she was the gold medalist in teams, All-Around and with ball.
