= Sofiya Mammadova =

Azeri rhythmic gymnast (born 2009)

- Born: 23 December 2009 (age 16)

Gymnastics career
- Discipline: Rhythmic gymnastics
- Country represented: Azerbaijan; (2024-present)
- Club: Ojaq Sports Club
- Head coach: Abdusalimova Nigar
Medal record
Rhythmic Gymnastics
Representing Azerbaijan
European Cup
Gold medal – first place	2025 Baku	3 Balls & 2 Hoops
Bronze medal – third place	2025 Baku	Cross Battle
Gymnasiade
Gold medal – first place	Bahrain 2024	Hoop
Silver medal – second place	Bahrain 2024	Ball
Bronze medal – third place	Bahrain 2024	All-Around

Sofiya Mammadova (born 23 December 2009) is an Azeri rhythmic gymnast. She represents Azerbaijan in international competitions.

== Career ==
=== Junior ===
In 2024 Mammadova won silver in team and with ball as well as bronze with hoop at the Irina Deleanu Cup. In October she was selected for the Gymnasiade in Bahrain, there she won gold with hoop, silver with ball and bronze in the All-Around. In December she won silver with ribbon at the LUXGR Cup 2024.

=== Senior ===
She became a senior in 2025, being incorporated into the Azeri group. In May Mammadova, Kamilla Aliyeva, Laman Alimuradova, Yelyzaveta Luzan and Darya Sorokina, competed at the 2nd European Cup in Baku winning bronze in the cross battle and gold with 3 balls & 2 hoops.
