= Nina Keys =

American rhythmic gymnast (born 2011)

- Born: 23 July 2011 (age 15)
- Relatives: Rin Keys

Gymnastics career
- Discipline: Rhythmic gymnastics
- Country represented: United States; (2025-present)
- Club: Burlo Gymnastics
- Head coach: Kamelia Dunavska
- Assistant coach: Margarita Mamzina
Medal record
Representing United States
Rhythmic gymnastics
Junior World Championships
Silver medal – second place	2025 Sofia	Team
Junior Pan American Championships
Gold medal – first place	2026 Rio de Janeiro	Team
Gold medal – first place	2026 Rio de Janeiro	Clubs
Gold medal – first place	2026 Rio de Janeiro	Ribbon
Silver medal – second place	2025 Asunción	Group All-Around
Silver medal – second place	2025 Asunción	5 Hoops
Bronze medal – third place	2025 Asunción	10 Clubs
Junior Pan American Games
Silver medal – second place	2025 Asunción	Group All-around
Silver medal – second place	2025 Asunción	10 Clubs
Bronze medal – third place	2025 Asunción	5 Hoops

Nina Keys (born 23 July 2011) is an American rhythmic gymnast who has competed as both an individual and group member.

== Personal life ==
Keys's older sister, Rin, is also a rhythmic gymnast and the first World Championship medalist for the United States.

== Career ==
In 2024, Keys became a member of her club's junior group, which won the domestic Rhythmic Challenge in February.

=== Junior ===
Keys became a junior in 2025. In March, she helped her teammates take gold at the Rhythmic Challenge. They made their international debut at the Aphrodite Cup in Athens, where they placed 11th overall and won bronze with 10 clubs. In May, they won bronze in the all-around as well as silver with 5 hoops and 10 clubs, as well as in the team event (along with Natalie De la Rosa and Anna Filipp), at the Shining Star International Tournament. The group went on to win all three golds at the Elite Qualifier.

Keys then participated in the Pan American Championships in Asunción, taking silver in the all-around and with 5 hoops and bronze with 10 clubs. On 20 June, their group was again named the national junior group for 2025–2026. In late June, she was selected for the 3rd Junior World Championships in Sofia, where she won a silver in the team event along with her groupmates, Sasha Kuliyev, Leyla Kukhmazova, Ziah Khan, Alana Hirota and Katherine Roytman, and individuals Natalie De la Rosa and Anna Filipp. The was the first time that US gymnasts had medaled at the Junior World Championships. In August, they won silver in the all-aound and with 10 clubs as well as bronze with 5 hoops at the Junior Pan American Games.

For 2026, Keys switched back to competing as an individual. In May, she competed at the Gdynia Rhythmic Stars, where she was 7th with hoop and 4th with ribbon. Later, she took silver at the Elite Qualifier, behind Anna Filipp. She was then selected to compete with clubs and ribbon at the Pan American Championships in Rio de Janeiro. She won gold in the two event finals and in the team event (with Anna Filipp, Izabella Oleynik and Josephine Weber). The following month, she won gold with ribbon at the USA Championships, after which she was confirmed as a national team member. In October, she was called up for a choreography camp to select gymnasts for the national senior group for the upcoming season, for which she was chosen.

== Competitive highlights ==
As an individual gymnast

Year	Event	Team	AA	Hoop	Ball	Clubs	Ribb.
International
2022	Aeon Cup	3rd	2nd J				
2023	Aeon Cup		3rd J				
2025	Aeon Cup	3rd	2nd				
