= Jana Alemam =

Canadian rhythmic gymnast

- Full name: Jana Ekramy Ali Ismail Sayed Ah Alemam
- Born: 19 September 2009 (age 16) Egypt

Gymnastics career
- Discipline: Rhythmic gymnastics
- Country represented: Canada (2023-)
- Club: Kalev Estienne
- Head coach: Janika Mölder
- Former coach: Svetlana Joukova
Medal record
Rhythmic Gymnastics
Representing Canada
Pan American Championships
Silver medal – second place	2025 Asunción	Group all-around
Junior Pan American Championships
Bronze medal – third place	2024 Ciudad de Guatemala	Team
Bronze medal – third place	2024 Ciudad de Guatemala	Clubs
Pacific Rim Championships
Silver medal – second place	2024 Cali	Team
Silver medal – second place	2024 Cali	Hoop (junior)
Bronze medal – third place	2024 Cali	All-around (junior)
Bronze medal – third place	2024 Cali	Ribbon (junior)

Jana Alemam (born 19 September 2009) is a Canadian rhythmic gymnast of Egyptian origin who has competed as both an individual and group member. She won a silver medal in the group all-around at the 2025 Pan American Championships.

== Early life ==
Aleman was born in Egypt. In 2018, when she was nine years old, her family moved with her and her two brothers to Regina, Saskatchewan. She speaks three languages: Arabic, English, and French.

== Career ==
Aleman took up gymnastics at age three, encouraged by her mother.

=== Junior ===
Alemam competed at the 2023 Pan American Championships in June. She and her teammates finished fourth in the team competition, and individually, she placed 12th in the all-around. She qualified for the ball and clubs finals and finished 7th in each.

In July, Aleman was selected for the Junior World Championships in Cluj-Napoca, Romania along with Veronika Drevylo and the junior group. There she competed with two of the four apparatuses, and she took 29th place with hoop, 37th with clubs and 28th in the team competition.

In late April 2024, she competed at the Pacific Rim Championships in Cali, Colombia. There she won bronze in the all-around; she posted the fourth-highest score, but the top three gymnasts were all from the United States, and due to the two-per-country rule, Aleman won the bronze medal. In the apparatus final, she won silver with hoop and another bronze with ribbon. She also won silver in the team competition, along with her teammates, Eva Cao, Tatiana Cocsanova, Carmel Kallemaa, Suzanna Shahbazian and Kate Vetricean.

In May, Aleman won the junior national title. She was then selected for the Pan American Championships in Guatemala City, where she placed 9th in the all-around. However, she won the bronze in the team competition (along with teammates Cao and Vetricean) and with clubs, the only apparatus final that she qualified for. She scored the same as the silver medalist in the clubs final, Fernanda Alvaz, but Alvaz won the tiebreak.

=== Senior ===
In 2025, Alemam began competing as a member of the senior national group. The group competed at three events on the 2025 World Cup series, the World Cup held in Milan and the World Challenge Cups held in Cluj-Napoca and Portimão, Portugal; their best result was in Portimão, where they qualified for both event finals, placing 6th in the 5 ribbons final and 4th in the 3 balls + 2 hoops final.

The group won silver in the all-around at the 2025 Pan American Championships and placed 4th in both finals. At the World Championships, held in Rio de Janeiro, Brazil, they finished in 24th place in the all-around.

In February 2026, Alemam began competing as an individual again and entered the Rhythmic Elite Canada competition, where she placed 5th. She was selected for the 2026 Pan American Championships, where she competed with two apparatuses, hoops and clubs. Along with her Canadian teammates, she finished 4th in the team competition.

== Routine music information ==
Year	Apparatus	Music title
2026	Hoop	Irna / Valsapena by Cirque du Soleil
2026	Ball	Revolution by Eternal Eclipse
2026	Clubs	Madcap Masquerade by Caleb Swift and Hypersonic Music
2026	Ribbon	Warhammer Titan Theme by Samuel Kim
2024	Hoop	Show Me How You Burlesque by Christina Aguilera
2024	Ball	Grande Amore by Il Volo
2024	Clubs	Papi by Jennifer Lopez
2024	Ribbon	
2023	Hoop	Show Me How You Burlesque by Christina Aguilera
2023	Ball	
2023	Clubs	Strength of a Thousand Men (Instrumental) by Two Steps From Hell
2023	Ribbon	
