= 2024 Pan American Rhythmic Gymnastics Championships =

International sports competition

- Venue: Gimnasio Teodoro Palacios Flores
- Location: Guatemala City, Guatemala
- Start date: 6 June 2024
- End date: 9 June 2024

The 2024 Pan American Rhythmic Gymnastics Championships were held in Guatemala City, Guatemala, June 6–9, 2024. The competition was approved by the International Gymnastics Federation.

== Medal summary ==
=== Senior ===
Event	Gold	Silver	Bronze
Team	Brazil; Maria Eduarda Alexandre; Bárbara Domingos; Geovanna Santos	United States; Jaelyn Chin; Megan Chu; Alexandria Kautzman; Rin Keys	Canada; Tatiana Cocsanova; Carmel Kallemaa; Suzanna Shahbazian
Individual all-around	(Brazil) Bárbara Domingos	(United States) Rin Keys	(Brazil) Maria Eduarda Alexandre
Hoop	(Brazil) Bárbara Domingos	(Brazil) Geovanna Santos	(United States) Megan Chu
Ball	(Brazil) Maria Eduarda Alexandre	(United States) Rin Keys	(United States) Megan Chu
Clubs	(United States) Rin Keys	(Brazil) Bárbara Domingos	(Brazil) Maria Eduarda Alexandre
Ribbon	(Brazil) Maria Eduarda Alexandre	(Brazil) Bárbara Domingos	(Mexico) Marina Malpica
Group all-around	Mexico; Dalia Alcocer; Ana Flores; Julia Gutierrez; Kimberly Salazar; Adirem Tejeda	Brazil; Maria Eduarda Arakaki; Victória Borges; Sofia Pereira; Déborah Medrado; Nicole Pircio	Colombia; Karen Duarte; Paula Flechas; Natalia Jiménez; Adriana Mantilla; Laura Patiño; Kizzy Rivas
Group 5 hoops	Brazil; Maria Eduarda Arakaki; Victória Borges; Sofia Pereira; Déborah Medrado; Nicole Pircio	Mexico; Dalia Alcocer; Ana Flores; Julia Gutierrez; Kimberly Salazar; Adirem Tejeda	Chile; Martina Espejo; Antonia Gallegos; Annalena Ley; Isabel Lozano; Martina Valdez
Group 3 ribbons + 2 balls	Mexico; Dalia Alcocer; Ana Flores; Julia Gutierrez; Kimberly Salazar; Adirem Tejeda	Brazil; Maria Eduarda Arakaki; Victória Borges; Sofia Pereira; Déborah Medrado; Nicole Pircio	Argentina; Lara Aimeri; Lucia Arrascaeta; Pilar Cattaneo; Lucia González; Gabriela Vega

=== Junior ===
Event	Gold	Silver	Bronze
Team	United States; Natalie de la Rosa; Isabella Chong; Dawn Kim; Alicia Liu	Brazil; Fernanda Alvaz; Sarah Mourão; Gabriela Cunha; Stefhany Popoatzki	Canada; Kate Vetricean; Jana Alemam; Eva Cao
Individual all-around	(United States) Natalie de la Rosa	(United States) Isabella Chong	(Canada) Kate Vetricean
Hoop	(United States) Isabella Chong	(Mexico) Ana Luisa Abraham	(Brazil) Sarah Mourão
Ball	(United States) Natalie de la Rosa	(United States) Isabella Chong	(Brazil) Fernanda Alvaz
Clubs	(United States) Dawn Kim	(Brazil) Fernanda Alvaz	(Canada) Jana Alemam
Ribbon	(United States) Isabella Chong	(Mexico) Constanza Galindo	(Venezuela) Jimena Dominguez
Group all-around	Brazil; Andriely Cichovicz; Júlia Colere; Luiza Miranda; Alice Neves; Giovana Parra; Clara Pereira	Mexico; Eva Arevalo; Renata Carrasco; Mariela Lozano; Jaydi Novelo; Barbara Ponce	United States; Claire Glukovsky; Sasha Kuliyev; Joy Lee; Katerina Levit; Natalia Serobian; Aurora Sullivan
Group 5 hoops	Brazil; Andriely Cichovicz; Júlia Colere; Luiza Miranda; Alice Neves; Giovana Parra; Clara Pereira	United States; Claire Glukovsky; Sasha Kuliyev; Joy Lee; Katerina Levit; Natalia Serobian; Aurora Sullivan	Canada; Sofie Belova; Natalie Grigore; Angelica Hing; Martina Ma; Emily Pimenovsky; Anastasia Sennikov
Group 5 clubs	Brazil; Andriely Cichovicz; Júlia Colere; Luiza Miranda; Alice Neves; Giovana Parra; Clara Pereira	Mexico; Eva Arevalo; Renata Carrasco; Mariela Lozano; Jaydi Novelo; Barbara Ponce	United States; Claire Glukovsky; Sasha Kuliyev; Joy Lee; Katerina Levit; Natalia Serobian; Aurora Sullivan

=== Age group ===
Event	Gold	Silver	Bronze
Team	United States; Riko Kawai; Josephine Weber	Canada; Lillian Yevzlin; Gillian Lu; Milana Sholkavich; Iana Ivanova	Brazil; Anna Júlia de Carvalho; Beatriz Vieira
Hoop	(United States) Josephine Weber	(Canada) Lillian Yevzlin	(Mexico) Marijose Delgado
Ball	(Brazil) Anna Júlia de Carvalho	(United States) Josephine Weber	(Mexico) Marijose Delgado
Clubs	(United States) Riko Kawai	(Canada) Milana Sholkavich	(Brazil) Anna Júlia de Carvalho
Ribbon	(Brazil) Beatriz Vieira	(Canada) Iana Ivanova	(United States) Riko Kawai

== Medal table ==
Rank	Nation	Gold	Silver	Bronze	Total
1	Brazil	11	7	6	24
2	United States	10	7	5	22
3	Mexico	2	5	3	10
4	Canada	0	4	5	9
5	Argentina	0	0	1	1
5	Chile	0	0	1	1
5	Colombia	0	0	1	1
5	Venezuela	0	0	1	1
Totals (8 entries)		23	23	23	69
