= Gymnastics at the 2024 Summer Gymnasiade =

Gymnasiade
- Location: Manama, Bahrain
- Date: October 23–31, 2024

The gymnastics competitions at the 2024 Summer Gymnasiade were held from October 23 to 31, 2024 in Manama, Bahrain.

== Medal winners ==
=== Artistic gymnastics ===
Event	Gold	Silver	Bronze
Men
Team	France; Elias Brèche; Valentin le Pivert; Karim Mangala-Bima; Naël Sakouhi; Leeroy Traoré Malatre	Hungary; Bence Hamza-Vargity; Dominik Kis; Nándor Sas; Zala Samu Zambori	Turkey; Kartın Metehan; Oğuz Kağan Kaya; Deniz Şen; Çağrı Yılmaz
All-around	(France) Naël Sakouhi	(Hungary) Zala Samu Zambori	(France) Leeroy Traoré Malatre
Floor exercise	(France) Naël Sakouhi	(Hungary) Zala Samu Zambori (Chinese Taipei) Liu Yen-fu	Not awarded
Pommel horse	(Hungary) Nándor Sas	(France) Karim Mangala Bima	(Cyprus) Petros Gogos
Still rings	(Hungary) Zala Samu Zambori	(Cyprus) Stylianos Vasiliades	(France) Naël Sakouhi (Armenia) Robert Gyulumyan
Vault	(Ukraine) Valentyn Havrylchenko	(Hungary) Dominik Kis (Turkey) Kartın Metehan	Not awarded
Parallel bars	(France) Naël Sakouhi	(France) Leeroy Traoré Malatre	(Turkey) Kartın Metehan (Greece) Emmanouil Stoupakis
Horizontal bar	(France) Naël Sakouhi	(France) Leeroy Traoré Malatre	(Hungary) Dominik Kis
Women
Team	France; Noélie Ayuso; Juliette Certain; Romane Hamelin; Inaya Lamri; Astria Nélo	Brazil; Nicole Campos; Julia Coutinho; Maria Eduarda Montesino; Sophia Weisberg	Ukraine; Daria Chorna; Kristina Hrudetska; Maryna Klishchevska; Anastasia Lev
All-around	(Romania) Alexia Blanaru	(Brazil) Maria Eduarda Montesino	(France) Inaya Lamri (Ukraine) Anastasia Lev
Vault	(Brazil) Nicole Campos	(Romania) Alexia Blanaru	(Turkey) İrem Karabalık
Uneven bars	(France) Romane Hamelin	(Brazil) Sophia Weisberg	(Brazil) Maria Eduarda Montesino
Balance beam	(France) Noélie Ayuso	(France) Inaya Lamri	(Malta) Sophie St. John
Floor exercise	(France) Juliette Certain	(Romania) Alexia Blanaru	(France) Noélie Ayuso

=== Rhythmic gymnastics ===
Event	Gold	Silver	Bronze
Individual all-around	(China) Wang Qi	(Azerbaijan) Shams Aghahuseynova	(Azerbaijan) Sofiya Mammadova
Hoop	(Azerbaijan) Sofiya Mammadova	(Hungary) Elena Vukmir	(Azerbaijan) Shams Aghahuseynova
Ball	(China) Wang Qi	(Azerbaijan) Sofiya Mammadova	(Hungary) Elena Vukmir
Clubs	(China) Wang Qi	(Hungary) Boglarka Barkóczi	(Ukraine) Taisiia Redka
Ribbon	(China) Wang Qi	(Azerbaijan) Shams Aghahuseynova	(Brazil) Sarah Mourão
Group all-around	Brazil; Andriely Cichovicz; Júlia Colere; Alice Neves; Clara Pereira; Sophia Xavier; Maria Fernanda Medeiros	Ukraine; Khrystyna Shkolnykova; Oleksandra Nikol Samoukina; Svitlana Apatkina; Anna Shcherbukha; Kateryna Shershen	Hungary; Szulamit Greta Bunda; Reka Barbara Titonelli; Georgina Koszegi-Kohary; Boglarka Barkóczi; Fruzsina Grek
5 Hoops	Brazil; Andriely Cichovicz; Júlia Colere; Alice Neves; Clara Pereira; Sophia Xavier	Ukraine; Khrystyna Shkolnykova; Oleksandra Nikol Samoukina; Svitlana Apatkina; Anna Shcherbukha; Kateryna Shershen	Hungary; Szulamit Greta Bunda; Reka Barbara Titonelli; Georgina Koszegi-Kohary; Boglarka Barkóczi; Fruzsina Grek
10 Clubs	Ukraine; Khrystyna Shkolnykova; Oleksandra Nikol Samoukina; Svitlana Apatkina; Anna Shcherbukha; Kateryna Shershen	Brazil; Andriely Cichovicz; Júlia Colere; Alice Neves; Clara Pereira; Maria Fernanda Medeiros	Hungary; Szulamit Greta Bunda; Reka Barbara Titonelli; Georgina Koszegi-Kohary; Boglarka Barkóczi; Fruzsina Grek

== Medal table ==
Rank	Nation	Gold	Silver	Bronze	Total
1	France (FRA)	9	4	4	17
2	China (CHN)	4	0	0	4
3	Brazil (BRA)	3	4	1	8
4	Hungary (HUN)	2	6	5	13
5	Ukraine (UKR)	2	2	3	7
6	Azerbaijan (AZE)	1	2	2	5
7	Romania (ROU)	1	2	0	3
8	Turkey (TUR)	0	1	3	4
9	Cyprus (CYP)	0	1	1	2
10	Chinese Taipei (TPE)	0	1	0	1
11	Armenia (ARM)	0	0	1	1
11	Greece (GRE)	0	0	1	1
11	Malta (MLT)	0	0	1	1
Totals (13 entries)		22	23	22	67
