= 2024 Pacific Rim Gymnastics Championships =

Gymnastics event in Cali, Colombia

- Venues: Coliseo El Pueblo
- Location: Cali, Colombia
- Dates: April 21–28, 2024
- Competitors: in 52 events

The 2024 Pacific Rim Gymnastics Championships (20th Pacific Rim Championships) was held from April 21–28, 2024 at the Coliseo El Pueblo in Cali, Colombia. It featured men's and women's artistic gymnastics, rhythmic gymnastics, trampoline, and aerobic gymnastics.

== Background ==
This was the first Pacific Rim Championships held since 2018. The 2020 edition, which was scheduled to be held in New Zealand, was cancelled due to the global COVID-19 pandemic and no plans were made for the event in 2022.

== Medalists ==
=== Artistic gymnastics ===
==== Men's events ====
Event	Gold	Silver	Bronze
Team	United States; Cameron Bock; Caden Clinton; Danila Leykin; Yul Moldauer; Kai Uemura	Canada; Zachary Clay; René Cournoyer; Félix Dolci; Chris Kaji; Jayson Rampersad; Sam Zakutney	Colombia; Jordan Castro; Manuel López; José Martínez; Thomas Mejía; Camilo Vera; Yan Zabala
Senior (Note: Two-per-country rule：Each country in each item can being awarded two most medals.)
All-Around	(United States) Yul Moldauer	(United States) Cameron Bock	(Canada) René Cournoyer
Floor exercise	(United States) Yul Moldauer	(New Zealand) Benjamin Stein	(Canada) Sam Zakutney
Pommel Horse	(Canada) Jayson Rampersad	(Canada) Zachary Clay	(United States) Caden Clinton
Rings	(United States) Cameron Bock (United States) Yul Moldauer	Not awarded	(Canada) Chris Kaji
Vault	(Philippines) John Ivan Cruz	(Hong Kong) Ng Ka Ki	(Philippines) Juancho Miguel Besana
Parallel Bars	(United States) Yul Moldauer	(United States) Cameron Bock	(Canada) René Cournoyer
Horizontal Bar	(Canada) Sam Zakutney	(Canada) René Cournoyer	(United States) Cameron Bock
Junior
All-Around	(Colombia) Camilo Vera	(Philippines) Eldrew Yulo	(Mexico) David Hernández
Floor exercise	(Philippines) Eldrew Yulo	(Mexico) David Hernández	(Colombia) Camilo Vera
Pommel Horse	(Mexico) David Hernández	(Philippines) Eldrew Yulo (Mexico) Francisco Ibarra (Colombia) Yan Zabala (United States) Danila Leykin	Not awarded
Rings	(Colombia) Camilo Vera	(Philippines) Eldrew Yulo	(Mexico) Mauricio Solorza
Vault	(Philippines) Eldrew Yulo	(Chile) Agustín Espinoza	(Hong Kong) Cheung Ching
Parallel Bars	(Colombia) Manuel López	(Australia) William Cooper	(Mexico) Francisco Ibarra
Horizontal Bar	(Colombia) Camilo Vera	(Colombia) Manuel López	(United States) Danila Leykin

==== Women's events ====
Event	Gold	Silver	Bronze
Team	United States; Kieryn Finnell; Jayla Hang; Madray Johnson; Simone Rose	Canada; Laurie Denommée; Maddison Hajjar; Amy Jorgensen; Kahlyn Lawson; Evandra Zlobec	Guatemala; Krystal Cancax Saquec; Mishell Echeverría; Brithany Herrera; Vania Herrera; Mersi Xep Max
Senior
All-Around	(United States) Jayla Hang	(United States) Madray Johnson	(Canada) Kahlyn Lawson
Vault	(Costa Rica) Franciny Morales	(New Zealand) Ava Fitzgerald	(Philippines) Ancilla Mari Lucia Manzano
Uneven Bars	(United States) Simone Rose	(Canada) Evandra Zlobec	(United States) Jayla Hang
Balance Beam	(United States) Kieryn Finnell	(Canada) Amy Jorgensen	(United States) Jayla Hang
Floor exercise	(United States) Simone Rose	(United States) Jayla Hang	(Canada) Maddison Hajjar
Junior
All-Around	(Panama) Alyiah Lide de León	(Panama) Ana Lucía Beitía	(Guatemala) Vania Herrera
Vault	(Panama) Alyiah Lide de León	(Guatemala) Mishell Echeverría	(Colombia) Sofia Marin
Uneven Bars	(Panama) Alyiah Lide de León	(Colombia) Sofia Marin	(Panama) Ana Lucía Beitía
Balance Beam	(Panama) Alyiah Lide de León	(Guatemala) Mishell Echeverría	(Colombia) Sofia Marin
Floor exercise	(Panama) Alyiah Lide de León	(Guatemala) Mersi Xep Max	(Colombia) Luisana Padilla

=== Rhythmic gymnastics ===
Event	Gold	Silver	Bronze
Team	United States; Jaelyn Chin; Isabella Chong; Megan Chu; Yana Golovan; Dawn Kim; Natalie de la Rosa	Canada; Jana Alemam; Eva Cao; Tatiana Cocsanova; Carmel Kallemaa; Suzanna Shahbazian; Kate Vetricean	Colombia; Sara Correa; Vanessa Galindo; Luna Henao; Emiliana Vargas; Juliana Villareal; Oriana Viñas
Senior
Individual All-Around	(United States) Megan Chu	(United States) Jaelyn Chin	(Canada) Tatiana Cocsanova
Hoop	(United States) Megan Chu	(United States) Jaelyn Chin	(Canada) Suzanna Shahbazian
Ball	(United States) Jaelyn Chin	(United States) Megan Chu	(Canada) Suzanna Shahbazian
Clubs	(United States) Megan Chu	(United States) Jaelyn Chin	(Canada) Tatiana Cocsanova
Ribbon	(United States) Megan Chu	(United States) Yana Golovan	(Canada) Suzanna Shahbazian
Senior Groups
Group All-Around	Canada	Chile; Antonia Gallegos; Annalena Ley; Martina Valdés; Isabel Lozano; Martina Espejo; Josefina Romero	Colombia; Karen Duarte; Natalia Jiménez; Adriana Mantilla; Laura Patiño; Kizzy Rivas; Isabela Salazar
Group 5 Hoops	Canada	Chile; Antonia Gallegos; Annalena Ley; Martina Valdés; Isabel Lozano; Martina Espejo; Josefina Romero	Colombia; Karen Duarte; Natalia Jiménez; Adriana Mantilla; Laura Patiño; Kizzy Rivas; Isabela Salazar
Group 3 Ribbons + 2 Balls	Chile; Antonia Gallegos; Annalena Ley; Martina Valdés; Isabel Lozano; Martina Espejo; Josefina Romero	Canada	Colombia; Karen Duarte; Natalia Jiménez; Adriana Mantilla; Laura Patiño; Kizzy Rivas; Isabela Salazar
Junior
Individual All-Around	(United States) Natalie de la Rosa	(United States) Dawn Kim	(Canada) Jana Alemam
Hoop	(United States) Isabella Chong	(Canada) Jana Alemam	(Canada) Eva Cao
Ball	(United States) Natalie de la Rosa	(United States) Dawn Kim	(Canada) Eva Cao
Clubs	(United States) Isabella Chong	(United States) Natalie de la Rosa	(Canada) Kate Vetricean
Ribbon	(United States) Natalie de la Rosa	(United States) Dawn Kim	(Canada) Jana Alemam

=== Trampoline ===
Event	Gold	Silver	Bronze
Men's team	Japan; Daiki Kishi; Ryosuke Sakai; Tsuzuku Kanato; Yusei Matsumoto	Colombia; Julian Alvis; Gabriel Pinzon; Manuel Sierra	United States; Nate Erkert; Ryan Maccagnan; Alexander Rozenshteyn; Elijah Vogel
Women's team	United States; Grace Danley; Ava DeHanes; Leah Edelman; Alexandra Mytnik	Canada; Gabriella Flynn; Brooklyn Lee-McMeeken; Amylia Lepore; Rachel Tam	Mexico; Veronica Borges; Aixa de Leon; Dafne Navarro; Patricia Nuñez
Senior
Men's individual	(Japan) Ryosuke Sakai	(Japan) Yusei Matsumoto	(United States) Ryan Maccagnan
Women's individual	(Japan) Yuka Misawa	(Mexico) Dafne Navarro	(Canada) Gabriella Flynn
Junior
Men's individual	(United States) Alexander Rozenshteyn	(Colombia) Gabriel Pinzon	(Canada) Tristan Bloom
Women's individual	(Canada) Amylia Lepore	(United States) Grace Danley	(Canada) Brooklyn Lee-Mcmeeken

=== Aerobic ===
Event	Gold	Silver	Bronze
Senior
Men's individual	(Mexico) Ivan Veloz	(Mexico) Alberto Nava	(Colombia) Elian Florez
Women's individual	(Peru) Thais Fernández	(Mexico) Fernanda González	(Peru) María Méndez
Trio	Mexico	Peru	Colombia
Junior
Men's individual	(Mexico) Malek Iniestra	(Colombia) Sebastián Rodríguez	(Colombia) Alberto Forero
Women's individual	(Colombia) Valentina Noriega	(Mexico) Fernanda Padilla	(Panama) Sofia Gutiérrez
Trio	Colombia	Mexico	Not awarded

== Medal table ==
Rank	Nation	Gold	Silver	Bronze	Total
1	United States	24	15	7	46
2	Colombia	6	7	12	25
3	Canada	5	10	19	34
4	Panama	5	1	2	8
5	Mexico	4	6	4	14
6	Philippines	3	3	2	8
7	Japan	3	1	0	4
8	Chile	1	3	0	4
9	Peru	1	1	1	3
10	Costa Rica	1	0	0	1
11	Guatemala	0	3	2	5
12	New Zealand	0	2	0	2
13	Hong Kong	0	1	1	2
14	Australia	0	1	0	1
Totals (14 entries)		53	54	50	157

1. Artistic gymnastics: 26 events
2. Rhythmic gymnastics: 14 events
3. Trampoline gymnastics: 6 events
4. Aerobic gymnastics: 6 events
