= 2021 Junior Pan American Rhythmic Gymnastics Championships =

International sports competition

The 2021 Junior Pan American Rhythmic Gymnastics Championships was held in Guatemala City, Guatemala, June 25–27, 2021.

== Medal summary ==
Event	Gold	Silver	Bronze
Team	United States; Megan Chu; Rin Keys; Sarah Mariotti; Erika Rusak	Mexico; Crista Hernández; Sofía Pérez; Désirée Portugal	Argentina; Eugenia Angelin; Maria Victoria Cantale; Lara Granero; Agostina Vargas Re
Individual all-around	Megan Chu (USA)	Sofía Pérez (MEX)	Rin Keys (USA)
Hoop	Megan Chu (USA)	Sofía Pérez (MEX)	Crista Hernández (MEX)
Ball	Désirée Portugal (MEX)	Megan Chu (USA)	Rin Keys (USA)
Clubs	Megan Chu (USA)	Sofía Pérez (MEX)	Rin Keys (USA)
Ribbon	Megan Chu (USA)	Sofía Pérez (MEX)	Sarah Mariotti (USA)
Group all-around	Mexico	United States	Chile
5 balls	Mexico	United States	Chile
5 ribbons	Mexico	United States	Chile

== Medal table ==
* Host nation (Guatemala)

Rank	nation	Gold	Silver	Bronze	Total
1	United States (USA)	5	4	4	13
2	Mexico (MEX)	4	5	1	10
3	Chile (CHI)	0	0	3	3
4	Argentina (ARG)	0	0	1	1
Totals (4 entries)		9	9	9	27
