= Barbara Ponce =

Mexican rhythmic gymnast

- Full name: Barbara Gabriela Ponce Vite
- Born: 3 February 2010 (age 16) Tampico

Gymnastics career
- Discipline: Rhythmic gymnastics
- Country represented: Mexico; (2023-present)
- Club: Unidep
- Head coach: Citlaly Quintá
Medal record
Representing Mexico
Rhythmic Gymnastics
Junior Pan American Games
Gold medal – first place	2025 Asunción	Group All-around
Gold medal – first place	2025 Asunción	10 Clubs
Silver medal – second place	2025 Asunción	5 Hoops
Junior Pan American Championships
Gold medal – first place	2025 Asunción	5 Hoops
Gold medal – first place	2025 Asunción	10 Clubs
Silver medal – second place	2023 Guadalajara	5 Ropes
Silver medal – second place	2024 Guatemala City	Group All-Around
Silver medal – second place	2024 Guatemala City	10 Clubs
Bronze medal – third place	2023 Guadalajara	Group All-Around
Bronze medal – third place	2023 Guadalajara	5 Balls
Bronze medal – third place	2025 Asunción	Group All-Around

Barbara Gabriela Ponce Vite (born 3 February 2010) is a Mexican rhythmic gymnast. She represents Mexico in international competitions.

== Career ==
Ponce took up rhythmic gymnastics at five years old.

=== Junior ===
In May 2023 her club, Unidep, was selected to represent Mexico at the Pan American Championships in Guadalajara. There they won silver with 5 ropes as well as bronze with 5 balls and in the All-Around. In July she competed, with Lili de Leon, Daniela Guzman, Zoe Lozano and Ivanna Rodriguez, at the 2nd Junior World Championships in Cluj-Napoca, being 33rd in the All-Around, 29th with 5 ropes, 33rd with 5 ropes and 26th in teams (along individuals Constanza Galindo, Valentina Moya and Amanda Bosch). The following month she won gold at the Mexican group championships.

The next season she was again called up for the 2024 Pan American Championships in Guatemala City alongside Eva Arevalo, Renata Carrasco, Mariela Lozano and Jaydi Novelo, winning silver in the All-Around and with 10 clubs. Later in the year she was confirmed into the national junior group.

In 2025 the group made its debut at the Aphrodite Cup in Athens, being 6th overall and winning two silver medals in the event finals. In May she competed at the Pan American Championships in Asunción, winning bronze in the All-Around and gold with both 5 hoops and 10 clubs. The following month she took part in the 3rd Junior World Championships in Sofia, being 14th overall, 9th with 5 hoops, 21st with 10 clubs and 17th in teams. In August she was selected for the Junior Pan American Games along Martha Coldwell, Jaydi Novelo, Ana Carolina Martínez and Fernanda Ramírez. There they won gold in the All-Around and with 5 pairs of clubs as well as silver with 5 hoops.
