= Gabriela Cunha =

Brazilian rhythmic gymnast (born 2009)

- Full name: Gabriela Ozeas Viamonte Cunha
- Born: 2009 (age 16–17) Natal, Rio Grande do Norte

Gymnastics career
- Discipline: Rhythmic Gymnastics
- Country represented: Brazil (2024-)
- Club: Aginat
Medal record
Rhythmic gymnastics
Representing Brazil
Junior South American Championships
Gold medal – first place	2024 Aracaju	Team
Bronze medal – third place	2024 Aracaju	Ball
Junior Pan American Championships
Silver medal – second place	2024 Ciudad de Guatemala	Team

Gabriela Ozeas Viamonte Cunha (born 2009) is a Brazilian rhythmic gymnast. She represents Brazil in international competitions.

== Career ==
Cunha took up the sport at age 6. In 2021 she started training at the club Aginat and became the national champion.

In 2022 she won bronze overall at the Brazilian Championships among those born in 2009. She also won bronze in the ball final. In December she was called up for a training camp of the national team.

The following year, she won gold in teams at nationals, along with her teammates Júlia Bessa and Isabella Anselmo. Individually, she took 9th place in the all-Around. In September she won silver in teams and was 10th overall at the national youth games. In November she won silver in duos at the group championships.

In June 2024 she competed at the Pan American Championships in Guatemala City, where she won silver in teams, along with Fernanda Alvaz, Sarah Mourão and Stefhany Popoatzki. In July she won bronze with hoop at the Brazilian Junior Championships. In October she ranked 9th in the all-around at the Gymnasiade in Bahrain. A month later she took 5th place overall and won bronze in teams at the Brazilian Youth Championships. In December she won gold in teams (along with her teammates Mourão and Popoatzki) as well as bronze with ball at the Junior South American Championships.
