= Martha Coldwell =

Mexican rhythmic gymnast

- Full name: Martha Coldwell Ruiz
- Born: 27 January 2010 (age 16) Mérida, Yucatán

Gymnastics career
- Discipline: Rhythmic gymnastics
- Country represented: Mexico (2024-present)
- Club: Heymo Gimnasia Ritmica
- Head coach: Blajaith Aguilar
- Former coach: Citlaly Quintá
Medal record
Rhythmic gymnastics
Representing Mexico
Junior Pan American Games
Gold medal – first place	2025 Asunción	Group All-around
Gold medal – first place	2025 Asunción	10 Clubs
Silver medal – second place	2025 Asunción	5 Hoops
Junior Pan American Championships
Gold medal – first place	2025 Asunción	5 Hoops
Gold medal – first place	2025 Asunción	10 Clubs
Bronze medal – third place	2025 Asunción	Group All-Around

Martha Coldwell Ruiz (born 27 January 2010) is a Mexican rhythmic gymnast. She represents Mexico in international competitions.

== Career ==
=== Junior ===
In late 2024 it was announced that Coldwell was selected for the Mexican junior group for the upcoming season.

The group made its debut at the Aphrodite Cup in Athens, being 6th overall and winning two silver medals in the event finals. In May she competed at the Pan American Championships in Asunción, winning bronze in the All-Around and gold with both 5 hoops and 10 clubs. The following month she took part in the 3rd Junior World Championships in Sofia, being 14th overall, 9th with 5 hoops, 21st with 10 clubs and 17th in teams. In August she was selected for the Junior Pan American Games along Barbara Ponce, Jaydi Novelo, Ana Carolina Martínez and Fernanda Ramírez. There they won gold in the All-Around and with 5 pairs of clubs as well as silver with 5 hoops.

=== Senior ===
She became age eligible for senior competitions in 2026, being incorporated into the Mexican senior group. In March, she was called up for a training camp in Beijing, China.
