= Sarah Mourão =

Brazilian rhythmic gymnast (born 2010)

- Full name: Sarah Ferreira Mourão
- Born: February 8, 2010 (age 16) Belo Horizonte

Gymnastics career
- Discipline: Rhythmic gymnastics
- Country represented: Brazil; (2022–)
- Head coach: Maria Inês Salles
Medal record
Rhythmic gymnastics
Representing Brazil
South American Championships
| Gold medal – first place | 2026 Asunción | Team |
| Gold medal – first place | 2026 Asunción | Clubs |
| Gold medal – first place | 2026 Asunción | All-Around Team |
Gymnasiade
| Bronze medal – third place | Bahrain 2024 | Ribbon |
Junior Pan American Games
| Silver medal – second place | 2025 Asunción | Clubs |
| Silver medal – second place | 2025 Asunción | Ribbon |
| Bronze medal – third place | 2025 Asunción | All-around |
| Bronze medal – third place | 2025 Asunción | Ball |
Junior Pan American Championships
| Silver medal – second place | 2024 Ciudad de Guatemala | Team |
| Silver medal – second place | 2025 Asunción | Hoop |
| Silver medal – second place | 2025 Asunción | Ribbon |
| Bronze medal – third place | 2024 Ciudad de Guatemala | Hoop |
Junior South American Championships
| Gold medal – first place | 2024 Aracaju | Team |
| Gold medal – first place | 2025 Posadas | Team |
| Gold medal – first place | 2025 Posadas | All-Around |
| Gold medal – first place | 2025 Posadas | Ball |
| Gold medal – first place | 2025 Posadas | Clubs |
| Silver medal – second place | 2024 Aracaju | All-Around |
| Silver medal – second place | 2024 Aracaju | Hoop |
| Silver medal – second place | 2024 Aracaju | Clubs |
| Bronze medal – third place | 2025 Posadas | Hoop |

Sarah Ferreira Mourão (born 8 February 2010) is a Brazilian rhythmic gymnast. She represents her country in international competitions.

== Biography ==
Sarah took up rhythmic gymnastics at age five, being influenced by her mother Karina who's a coach.

In 2022, as a pre-junior, she was selected for the South American Championships in Paipa. There she won silver in the All-Around, behind teammate Alice Medeiros, and gold in free hands.

=== Junior ===
In 2023 she became a junior and in July she was crowned national champion in the 13 years old category.

In 2024 she competed at the Pan American Championships in Guatemala City, she was 6th in the All-Around and won silver in teams, along Fernanda Alvaz, Gabriela Cunha and Stefhany Popoatzki, and bronze with hoop. In July she won gold in team, the All-Around and hoop as well as silver with clubs and bronze with ball at the Brazilian Junior Championships.

In May 2025 she was selected for the Junior Pan American Championships in Asunción, being 4th in teams, in the All-Around and with ball, winning silver with hoop. In June she took part in the 3rd edition of the Junior World Championships in Sofia, being 23rd with ball, 22nd with clubs and 7th in teams along Beatriz Vieira and the national junior group. In August she competed at the Junior Pan American Games in Asunción, winning bronze in the All-Around and with ball, as well as silver with clubs and with ribbon.

=== Senior ===
Mourão became age-eligible for senior competitions in 2026. In May, she made her debut in the category at the World Cup in Portimão. She took 20th place in all-around. In July, she represented Brazil at the 2026 South American Championships in Asunción, Paraguay, alongside Ana Luísa Neiva and Samara Sibin. They won gold medal in team competition. She took 4th place in all-around.

== Routine music information ==
| Year | Apparatus | Music title |
|---|---|---|
| 2026 | Hoop | |
| 2026 | Ball | |
| 2026 | Clubs | |
| 2026 | Ribbon | |
| 2025 | Hoop | |
| 2025 | Ball | Beyond by Gorm Sorensen |
| 2025 | Clubs | Você Chegou (Portuguese Version) by Barbatuques |
| 2025 | Ribbon | |
| 2024 | Hoop | Decimus (No Choir) by Audiomachine |
| 2024 | Ball | Red Violin Based On En Aranjuez Tu Amor by Ikuko Kawai |
| 2024 | Clubs | Trouble (feat. MC Spyder) by Wiwek, Gregor Salto |
| 2024 | Ribbon | Running with the Bulls by Benise |
