= Amanda Manente =

Brazilian rhythmic gymnast (born 2011)

- Full name: Amanda Silvares Dos Santos Manente
- Born: 27 August 2011 (age 15) São Mateus, Espírito Santo

Gymnastics career
- Discipline: Rhythmic gymnastics
- Country represented: Brazil; (2024–)
- Club: Instituto Capixaba Esportivo
- Head coach: Juliana Coradine
Medal record
Rhythmic gymnastics
Representing Brazil
Junior World Championships
Silver medal – second place	2025 Sofia	All-around
Silver medal – second place	2025 Sofia	5 Hoops
Junior Pan American Championships
Gold medal – first place	2025 Asunción	Group All-Around
Silver medal – second place	2025 Asunción	5 Hoops
Silver medal – second place	2025 Asunción	10 Clubs
Silver medal – second place	2026 Rio de Janeiro	Team
Bronze medal – third place	2026 Rio de Janeiro	Clubs
Junior Pan American Games
Gold medal – first place	2025 Asunción	5 Hoops
Bronze medal – third place	2025 Asunción	Group All-around
Bronze medal – third place	2025 Asunción	10 Clubs
South American Championships
Gold medal – first place	2024 Santiago	Age Group Team
Gold medal – first place	2024 Santiago	Age Group Ball
Gold medal – first place	2024 Santiago	Age Group Clubs
Junior South American Championships
Gold medal – first place	2024 Aracaju	Team
Gold medal – first place	2024 Aracaju	All-Around
Gold medal – first place	2024 Aracaju	Ribbon
Gold medal – first place	2026 Medellín	Team
Gold medal – first place	2026 Medellín	All-Around
Silver medal – second place	2024 Aracaju	Clubs
Bronze medal – third place	2024 Aracaju	Ribbon

Amanda Silvares Dos Santos Manente (born 27 August 2011) is a Brazilian rhythmic gymnast. She represents Brazil in international competitions.

== Career ==
In August 2024 Manente won gold at the Brazilian national group championships among juniors. In November of that year she took part in the South American Championships in Santiago, winning gold in teams (along Mariana Sartori), with ball and with clubs. A month later she competed in the Junior South American Championships in Aracaju, winning gold in teams, along Anna Julia De Carvalho and Beatriz Vieira, the All-Around team, in the All-Around and with ribbon, silver with clubs and bronze with hoop. In December she was called up to integrate the Brazilian junior group, it was later announced she was selected to be part of the group rooster.

In May 2025 she made her debut with the group at the Junior Pan American Championships in Asunción along Júlia Colere, Clara Pereira, Andriely Cichovicz and Alice Neves, winning gold in the All-Around and silver in the two event finals. Then she was named into the five group gymnasts that will compete at the 3rd Junior World Championships in Sofia. There the group won silver in the All-Around and with 5 hoops, the first medals for Brazil in a World Championships at either junior and senior level.

The following year she was selected, as an individual, to compete at the 2026 Pan American Championships in Rio de Janeiro. There she won silver in teams (along Beatriz Vieira, Linda Petersen and Mariana Sartori) and bronze with clubs.

== Routine music information ==
Year	Apparatus	Music title
2026	Hoop	Margherita by Riccardo Cocciante
2026	Ball	The Sound Of Silence (Live) by Paolo Belli Big Band
2026	Clubs	The Pitch (Spectacular Spectacular) by Friday Night At The Movies
2026	Ribbon	Angels Like You by Miley Cyrus
2024	Hoop	Encore un soir by Céline Dion
2024	Ball	
2024	Clubs	They Don't Care About Us by Matty Carter + Ariel
2024	Ribbon	Rocky This Party (Everybody Dance Now) by Bob Sinclair and Cutee B., feat Dollarman, Big Ali and Makedah
