= Stefhany Popoatzki =

Brazilian rhythmic gymnast (born 2009)

- Full name: Stefhany Beatriz Silva Popoatzki
- Born: October 13, 2009 (age 16) Cascavel

Gymnastics career
- Discipline: Rhythmic gymnastics
- Country represented: Brazil; (2024–)
- Head coach: Margarete Saffanauer
Medal record
Rhythmic gymnastics
Representing Brazil
Junior Pan American Championships
| Silver medal – second place | 2024 Ciudad de Guatemala | Team |
Junior South American Championships
| Gold medal – first place | 2024 Aracaju | Team |
| Gold medal – first place | 2024 Aracaju | Ribbon |
| Bronze medal – third place | 2024 Aracaju | All-Around |
South American Cup
| Gold medal – first place | 2025 Cochabamba | Team |
| Gold medal – first place | 2025 Cochabamba | All-Around Team |

Stefhany Beatriz Silva Popoatzki (born 14 October 2009) is a Brazilian rhythmic gymnast. She represents her country in international competitions.

== Career ==
In October 2018 Stefhany won gold in the All-Around and in free hands as well as silver with ball in a national tournament in São Bernardo do Campo. In 2019 she became Parana champion in the pre-children championships and the Brazilian Championships, also winning gold in the South American Championships.

Two years later she retained the Parana title, being champion also in 2020, topping the national and South American rankings too. In September 2022 she represented Paraná at the Youth Games along Maria Eduarda Alexandre and Isadora Oliveira. Later in the year she was called up for a training stage with the national team.

In 2024 she competed at the Pan American Championships in Guatemala City, she competed with two apparatuses and won silver in teams, along Fernanda Alvaz, Gabriela Cunha and Sarah Mourão. In July she won bronze in the All-Around and gold with ball at the Brazilian Junior Championships.
