= 2025 Pan American Rhythmic Gymnastics Championships =

International sports competition

- Venue: Gymnastics Pavillon Secretaría Nacional de Deportes' Complex
- Location: Asunción, Paraguay
- Start date: juniors May 22 to 25 2025, seniors May 30 to June 1 2025

The 2025 Pan American Rhythmic Gymnastics Championships was held in Asunción, Paraguay, from May 22 to 25 for juniors and from May 30 to June 1 2025 for seniors. The competition was organized by the Paraguayan Gymnastics Federation and approved by the International Gymnastics Federation.

== Participating countries ==
- Argentina
- Aruba
- Bolivia
- Brazil
- Canada
- Chile
- Colombia
- Costa Rica
- Cuba
- El Salvador
- Ecuador
- United States
- Guatemala
- Mexico
- Paraguay
- Peru
- Puerto Rico
- Dominican Republic
- Venezuela

== Competition schedule ==
=== Juniors ===
- Thursday, May 22
  - 09:30 - 10:30 Age Group Individual Qualification - (Hoop and Ball)
  - 10:45 - 13:00 Junior Individual Qualification - Group A (Hoop and Ball)
  - 14:00 Opening Ceremony
  - 14:30 - 16:45 Junior Individual Qualification - Group B (Hoop and Ball)
- Friday, May 23
  - 09:30 - 10:30 Age Group Individual Qualification - (Clubs and Ribbon)
  - 10:35 - 10:45 Age Group Team Awards Ceremony
  - 11:00 - 13:45 Junior Individual Qualification - Group B (Clubs and Ribbon)
  - 14:30 - 16:45 Junior Individual Qualification - Group A (Maces and Ribbon)
  - 16:55 - 17:10 Junior Team Awards Ceremony
  - 18:00 - 19:00 Junior Group Qualification - (5 Hoops)
- Saturday, May 24
  - 10:30 - 12:45 Individual Age Group Apparatus Finals
  - 12:55 - 13:10 Age Group Apparatus Awards Ceremony
  - 14:30 - 15:40 Junior Individual Apparatus Finals - Hoop and Ball
  - 15:45 - 15:55 Junior Individual Apparatus Awards Ceremony (Hoop and Ball)
  - 17:00 - 18:00 Junior Group Qualifying - (5 Clubs)
  - 18:10 - 18:20 Junior Group Awards Ceremony
- Sunday, May 25
  - 10:00 - 10:40 Junior Group Finals - 5 Hoops
  - 11:00 - 12:10 Junior Apparatus Finals - Clubs and Ribbon
  - 10:00 - 10:40 Junior Group Finals - 5 Clubs
  - 13:20 - 13:30 Junior Apparatus Awards Ceremony (Individual and Groups) (Clubs and Ribbon, 5 Hoops and 5 Clubs)

=== Seniors ===
- Friday, May 30
  - Senior Individual Qualification - Group A (Hoop and Ball)
  - Senior Individual Qualification - Group B (Hoop and Ball)
  - Senior Group Qualification - (5 Ribbons)
- Saturday, May 31
  - Senior Individual Qualification - Group B (Clubs and Ribbon)
  - Senior Individual Qualification - Group A (Clubs and Ribbon)
  - Senior Group Qualification - (3 Balls + 2 Hoops)
- Sunday, June 1
  - Senior Individual Final - Hoop
  - Senior Individual Final - Ball
  - Senior Group Final - 5 Ribbons
  - Senior Individual Final - Clubs
  - Senior Individual Final - Ribbon
  - Senior Group Final - 3 Balls + 2 Hoops

== Medal summary ==
=== Senior ===
Event	Gold	Silver	Bronze
Team	United States; Megan Chu; Rin Keys	Brazil; Bárbara Domingos; Geovanna Santos	Canada; Pin Rong Lee; Carmel Kallemaa; Suzanna Shahbazian
Individual all-around	(United States) Rin Keys	(Brazil) Barbara Domingos	(Brazil) Geovanna Santos
Hoop	(United States) Megan Chu	(Brazil) Geovanna Santos	(Brazil) Barbara Domingos
Ball	(United States) Rin Keys	(Brazil) Barbara Domingos	(United States) Megan Chu
Clubs	(United States) Rin Keys	(Brazil) Barbara Domingos	(Brazil) Geovanna Santos
Ribbon	(United States) Megan Chu	(United States) Rin Keys	(Brazil) Barbara Domingos
Group all-around	Brazil; Julia Kurunczi; Keila Santos; Lavinia Silvério; Maria Fernanda Moraes; Marianne Giovacchini; Rhayane Ferreira	Canada; Audrey Lu; Dina Burak; Elise Ghosh; Elizabet Piskunov; Jana Alemam; Margaret Kuts	United States; Alaini Spata; Anastasia Slipets; Annabella Hantov; Goda Balsys; Greta Pavilonyte; Natalia Ye-Granda
Group 5 ribbons	Brazil; Julia Kurunczi; Keila Santos; Lavinia Silvério; Maria Fernanda Moraes; Marianne Giovacchini; Rhayane Ferreira	Mexico; Adirem Tejeda; Ana Flores; Dalia Alcocer; Julia Gutierrez; Karen Villanueva	United States; Alaini Spata; Anastasia Slipets; Annabella Hantov; Goda Balsys; Greta Pavilonyte; Natalia Ye-Granda
Group 3 balls + 2 hoops	Brazil; Julia Kurunczi; Keila Santos; Lavinia Silvério; Maria Fernanda Moraes; Marianne Giovacchini; Rhayane Ferreira	United States; Alaini Spata; Anastasia Slipets; Annabella Hantov; Goda Balsys; Greta Pavilonyte; Natalia Ye-Granda	Mexico; Adirem Tejeda; Ana Flores; Dalia Alcocer; Julia Gutierrez; Karen Villanueva

=== Junior ===
Event	Gold	Silver	Bronze
Team	United States; Natalie de la Rosa; Dawn Kim; Anna Filipp; Alicia Liu	Mexico; Ana Luisa Abraham; Marijose Delgado; Mariann Estrada	Canada; Kate Vetricean; Olivia Nguyen; Eva Cao
Individual all-around	(United States) Natalie de la Rosa	(United States) Dawn Kim	(Mexico) Ana Luisa Abraham
Hoop	(United States) Natalie de la Rosa	(Brazil) Sarah Mourão	(Mexico) Ana Luisa Abraham
Ball	(United States) Natalie de la Rosa	(Mexico) Ana Luisa Abraham	(United States) Dawn Kim
Clubs	(United States) Natalie de la Rosa	(United States) Anna Filipp	(Mexico) Ana Luisa Abraham
Ribbon	(United States) Natalie de la Rosa	(Brazil) Sarah Mourão	(United States) Alicia Liu
Group all-around	Brazil; Júlia Colere; Clara Pereira; Andriely Cichovicz; Amanda Manente; Alice Neves	United States; Sasha Kuliyev; Nina Keys; Leyla Kukhmazova; Ziah Khan; Alana Hirota; Katherine Roytman	Mexico; Barbara Ponce; Jaydi Camila Novelo Evia; Ana Carolina Martinez; Martha Coldwell; Fernanda Ramirez Del Puerto
Group 5 hoops	Mexico; Barbara Ponce; Jaydi Camila Novelo Evia; Ana Carolina Martinez; Martha Coldwell; Fernanda Ramirez Del Puerto	Brazil; Júlia Colere; Clara Pereira; Andriely Cichovicz; Amanda Manente; Alice Neves United States; Sasha Kuliyev; Nina Keys; Leyla Kukhmazova; Ziah Khan; Alana Hirota; Katherine Roytman	Not awarded
Group 5 clubs	Mexico; Barbara Ponce; Jaydi Camila Novelo Evia; Ana Carolina Martinez; Martha Coldwell; Fernanda Ramirez Del Puerto	Brazil; Júlia Colere; Clara Pereira; Andriely Cichovicz; Amanda Manente; Alice Neves	United States; Sasha Kuliyev; Nina Keys; Leyla Kukhmazova; Ziah Khan; Alana Hirota; Katherine Roytman

=== Age group ===
Event	Gold	Silver	Bronze
Team	United States; Varvara Poniatovskaya; Valerie Magduk	Mexico; Sofia Mai Ruiz; Arantza Diaz; Alexa Hernandez	Canada; Elenora Khristoforova; Emeline Hagi
Hoop	(United States) Varvara Poniatovskaya	(Brazil) Melissa Varejão	(Canada) Emeline Hagi
Ball	(United States) Varvara Poniatovskaya	(Mexico) Sofia Mai Ruiz	(Brazil) Júlia Lorenzatto
Clubs	(United States) Valerie Magduk	(Brazil) Júlia Lorenzatto	(Canada) Elenora Khristoforova
Ribbon	(United States) Valerie Magduk	(Brazil) Melissa Varejão	(Mexico) Arantza Diaz

== Medal table ==
* Host nation (Paraguay)

Rank	Nation	Gold	Silver	Bronze	Total
1	United States	17	6	6	29
2	Brazil	4	12	5	21
3	Mexico	2	5	6	13
4	Canada	0	1	5	6
Totals (4 entries)		23	24	22	69
