= 2024 Junior South American Rhythmic Gymnastics Championships =

Rhythmic Gymnastics competition

- Location: Aracaju, Brazil
- Start date: 03 December 2024
- End date: 09 December 2024

The 2024 Junior South American Rhythmic Gymnastics Championships was held in Aracaju, Brazil from December 3 to December 9, 2024. The competition is organized by the Brazilian Gymnastics Federation and approved by the International Gymnastics Federation.

== Medalists ==
=== Junior ===
Event	Gold	Silver	Bronze
Team all-around	Brazil; Gabriela Cunha; Sarah Mourão; Stefhany Popoatzki	Venezuela; Jimena Dominguez; Luciana Caraballo; Thaycaramaloa Arias	Argentina; Livia Bustos; Emma Ceballos; Olivia Paez; Clara Squillari
Individual all-around	Jimena Dominguez (VEN)	Sarah Mourão (BRA)	Stefhany Popoatzki (BRA)
Hoop	Jimena Dominguez (VEN)	Sarah Mourão (BRA)	Constanza Ortiz (CHI)
Ball	Jimena Dominguez (VEN)	Adriana Zuleta (COL)	Gabriela Cunha (BRA)
Clubs	Jimena Dominguez (VEN)	Sarah Mourão (BRA)	Emma Ceballos (ARG)
Ribbon	Stefhany Popoatzki (BRA)	Jimena Dominguez (VEN)	Constanza Ortiz (CHI)
Group all-around	Brazil; Andriely Cichovicz; Júlia Colere; Alice Neves; Clara Pereira; Sophia Xavier	Chile; Karime Meneses; Sofia Vallejos; Amanda Depaux; Laura Avila; Florencia Lopez	Bolivia; Ines Pereyra; Andere Knez; Maria Saldias; Rafaela Añez; Ariane Chacon; Isabella Montero
Group 5 hoops	Brazil; Andriely Cichovicz; Júlia Colere; Alice Neves; Clara Pereira; Sophia Xavier	Colombia; Emilia Ospina; Danna Diaz; Susana Torres; Ashlee Patiño; Maria Mendoza Perutti	Bolivia; Ines Pereyra; Andere Knez; Maria Saldias; Rafaela Añez; Ariane Chacon; Isabella Montero
Group 10 clubs	Brazil; Andriely Cichovicz; Júlia Colere; Alice Neves; Clara Pereira; Sophia Xavier	Colombia; Emilia Ospina; Danna Diaz; Susana Torres; Ashlee Patiño; Maria Mendoza Perutti	Chile; Karime Meneses; Sofia Vallejos; Amanda Depaux; Laura Avila; Florencia Lopez
All-around team	Brazil; Gabriela Cunha; Sarah Mourão; Stefhany Popoatzki; Andriely Cichovicz; Júlia Colere; Alice Neves; Clara Pereira; Sophia Xavier	Chile; Constanza Ortiz; Isidora Gonzalez; Matilde Trivique; Karime Meneses; Sofia Vallejos; Amanda Depaux; Laura Avila; Florencia Lopez	Venezuela; Jimena Dominguez; Luciana Caraballo; Thaycaramaloa Arias; Amarantha Acosta; Albany Calles; Yoelenys Hernandez; Mariagabriela Rosriguez; Fabiana Marin

=== Age group ===
Event	Gold	Silver	Bronze
Team all-around	Brazil; Anna Julia De Carvalho; Amanda Manente; Beatriz Vieira	Argentina; Clara Marzo; Catalina Neri; Martina Tolosa	Chile; Dominga Badilla; Paula Hernandez; Leyla Zenteno
Individual all-around	Amanda Manente (BRA)	Anna Júlia De Carvalho (BRA)	Beatriz Vieira (BRA)
Hoop	Beatriz Vieira (BRA)	Catalina Neri (ARG)	Amanda Manente (BRA)
Clubs	Anna Julia De Carvalho (BRA)	Amanda Manente (BRA)	Melissa Parra (ECU)
Ribbon	Amanda Manente (BRA)	Leyla Zenteno (CHI)	Camila Arismendi (VEN)
Group All-Around	Brazil; Anna Laura Schutt; Danieli Girolometto; Emili Bello; Gabriela Girolometto; Heloyse Lima; Karen Ortolan	Ecuador; Valentina Sigcho; Abigail Melo; Karla Quinahuano; Camila Pillajo; Julieth Andrade	Venezuela; Maria Araujo; Mariangela Parra; Victoria Ordoñez; Lucia Ojeda; Iria Bohorquez
Group 5 hoops	Brazil; Anna Laura Schutt; Danieli Girolometto; Emili Bello; Gabriela Girolometto; Heloyse Lima; Karen Ortolan	Venezuela; Maria Araujo; Mariangela Parra; Victoria Ordoñez; Lucia Ojeda; Iria Bohorquez	Ecuador; Valentina Sigcho; Abigail Melo; Karla Quinahuano; Camila Pillajo; Julieth Andrade
Group 10 clubs	Brazil; Anna Laura Schutt; Danieli Girolometto; Emili Bello; Gabriela Girolometto; Heloyse Lima; Karen Ortolan	Venezuela; Maria Araujo; Mariangela Parra; Victoria Ordoñez; Lucia Ojeda; Iria Bohorquez	Chile; Martina Fernandez; Fernanda Aldunate; Isabella Farfan; Agustina Suzarte; Agustina Sepuleveda
All-around team	Brazil; Anna Julia De Carvalho; Amanda Manente; Beatriz Vieira; Anna Laura Schutt; Danieli Girolometto; Emili Bello; Gabriela Girolometto; Heloyse Lima; Karen Ortolan	Argentina; Clara Marzo; Catalina Neri; Martina Tolosa; Isabella Brochero; Danieli Girolometto; Bianca Chioso; Delfina Dallavalle; Malena Dre; Josefina Altamirano; Julia Teijero	Chile; Paula Hernandez; Dominga Badilla; Leyla Zenteno; Martina Fernandez; Fernanda Aldunate; Isabella Farfan; Agustina Suzarte; Agustina Sepuleveda

== Medal table ==
Rank	Nation	Gold	Silver	Bronze	Total
1	Brazil (BRA)	15	5	4	24
2	Venezuela (VEN)	4	4	3	11
3	Chile (CHI)	0	3	6	9
4	Argentina (ARG)	0	3	2	5
5	Colombia (COL)	0	3	0	3
6	Ecuador (ECU)	0	1	2	3
7	Bolivia (BOL)	0	0	2	2
Totals (7 entries)		19	19	19	57
