= 2016 Summer Gymnasiade =

- Host: Trabzon
- Country: Turkey
- Opening: 11 July 2018
- Closing: 18 July

16th Gymnasiade was held in Trabzon, Turkey, from 11 to 18 July 2016.

It was held in 10 sports (12 disciplines) with school sport athletes from 25 countries with 2500 athletes (Armenia, Belgium, Belarus, Brazil, Bulgaria, Cyprus, England, Estonia, France, Georgia, Greece, Hungary, India, Latvia, Morocco, Northern Ireland, Puerto Rico, Qatar, Romania, Russia, Slovakia, Chinese Taipei, Tunisia, Turkey, Ukraine). Present in the previous edition, five countries decided to boycott this edition due to the 2016 Turkish coup d'état attempt (Albania, Algeria, Azerbaijan, Croatia and the Islamic Republic of Iran).

== Sports ==
- Athletics ()
- Gymnastics ()
  - Artistic gymnastics
  - Rhythmic gymnastics
  - Aerobic Gymnastics
- Swimming
- Archery
- Fencing
- Judo
- Karate
- Wrestling
- Chess
- Tennis

== Medal table ==
Rank	Nation	Gold	Silver	Bronze	Total
1	Brazil	57	32	39	128
2	Turkey	47	45	27	119
3	France	15	18	23	56
4	Greece	12	17	7	36
5	India	10	19	26	55
6	Chinese Taipei	9	11	13	33
7	Romania	6	5	19	30
8	Morocco	6	5	6	17
9	Belarus	5	4	2	11
10	Armenia	5	2	8	15
11	Cyprus	4	4	5	13
12	Hungary	4	4	4	12
13	Georgia	2	6	3	11
14	Russia	1	4	7	12
15	Bulgaria	0	3	1	4
16	England	0	0	2	2
17	Latvia	0	0	1	1
17	Puerto Rico	0	0	1	1
17	Tunisia	0	0	1	1
20	Azerbaijan	0	0	0	0
20	Belgium	0	0	0	0
20	Croatia	0	0	0	0
20	Estonia	0	0	0	0
20	Northern Ireland	0	0	0	0
20	Qatar	0	0	0	0
Totals (25 entries)		183	179	195	557
