= World School Sport Games =

International multi-sport event

Gymnasiade
- Purpose: International multisport event for youth
- Frequency: Every 2 years
- Inaugurated: 1974
- Most recent: 2024 in Bahrain
- Next event: 2026 in Brazil
- Headquarters: Brussels, Belgium
- Website: http://www.isfsports.org International School Sport Federation

The Gymnasiade, or World Gymnasiade, or World School Sport Games, or ISF World School Sport Games is an international multi-sport event which is organised by the International School Sport Federation (ISF). It is the largest event among many other sport events held by the ISF. Aligned with the philosophy of the organisation, only individuals between the ages of 13 and 18 are eligible to compete.

The current regulations estipulate that the program of Gymnasiade is composed of twelve mandatory individual sports with five optional sports (three optional sports, along with two additional, chosen by the organizing committee). The current obligatory sports are: archery, athletics, boxing, chess, fencing, gymnastics, judo, karate, swimming, taekwondo, tennis, and wrestling. At the edition held in 2018, the organizing committee chose as optional sports: petanque, road cycling, surfing, and golf.

The first edition of the Gymnasiade was held in 1974 in Wiesbaden, Germany and it featured solely gymnastics, athletics and swimming competitions. Since then, numerous editions of Gymnasiade had been held. In 2018, Morocco staged the event, receiving more than 3000 young athletes representing 58 countries. It was the biggest edition so far and the first ever International Multisport event for youth held in Africa. The 2022 edition took place in May 2022 and was hosted in Normandy, France.

== Editions ==
=== ISF World School Summer Games U18 ===
First held in 1974 the ISF World Gymnasiade is a multi-sport games organised by the International School Sport Federation for athletes in the under 18 age group. The 1974 athletics competition was not included as part of the main event held in Wiesbaden (FRG). The event was originally held every 2 years but after 1990 was only held every 4 years. From 1974 to 2009 only three compulsory sports made part of the event program: gymnastics, athletics, swimming.

#	Year	Host	Dates	Sports	Nations	Top nation
Gymnasiade (Athletics, Swimming, Gymnastics)
1	1974	(West Germany) Wiesbaden	23–28 September	2	13	
2	1976	(France) Orléans	21–27 June	3	26	
3	1978	(Turkey) İzmir	18–24 July	3	17	
4	1979	(Italy) Turin	1–7 June	3	20	
5	1982	(France) Lille	1–6 June	3	24	
6	1984	(Italy) Florence	5–9 June	3	19	
7	1986	(France) Nice	2–7 June	3	22	
8	1988	(Spain) Barcelona	3–9 June	3	23	
9	1990	(Belgium) Bruges	20–27 May	3	30	
10	1994	(Cyprus) Nicosia	14–21 May	3	26	
11	1998	(China) Shanghai	12–19 October	3	33	
12	2002	(France) Caen	27 May–3 June	3	35	
13	2006	(Greece) Athens/Thessaloniki	26 June–3 July	3	36	
14	2009	(Qatar) Doha	7–12 December	3	39	
Gymnasiade (World School Sport Games)
15	2013	(Brazil) Brasília	28 November–4 December	8	35	
16	2016	(Turkey) Trabzon	11–18 July	12	28	
17	2018	(Morocco) Marrakesh	2–9 May	18	58	
U18 Gymnasiade (World School Sport Games)
18	2022	(France) Normandy	14–22 May	20	69	France
19	2024	Bahrain	23–31 October	26	71	Brazil
20	2026	(Brazil) Rio de Janeiro	2–9 December			
21	2028	TBD	TBD			
22	2032	TBD	TBD			

The 2020 Gymnasiade was scheduled to host in Jinjiang, China during 17–24 October, but after several postponements due to COVID-19 pandemic, ISF decided to cancel this event.

- 2013:
- 2016:
- 2018:
- 2022:
- 2024:

=== ISF World School Summer Games U15 ===
#	Year	Host	Dates	Sports
1	2021	(Serbia) Belgrade	11–19 September	14
2	2023	(Brazil) Rio de Janeiro	19–27 August	18
3	2025	(Serbia) Zlatibor	4–14 April	25

=== ISF World School Winter Games ===
Ages: 13 to 18

Year	Host	Dates
2023	(Turkey) Erzurum	cancelled
2025	(Switzerland) Lucerne	11–19 February (not held)
2027	(Brazil) São Roque and Campos do Jordão	10–17 July
2029	(Turkey) Erzurum	8–17 February

The 2023 Winter Gymnasiade was scheduled to host in Erzurum, Turkey during 11–18 February, but after the earthquake near the Syria–Turkey border regions, ISF decided to cancel the event.

- 2018 Trial Edition: 2018 Winter Games was held in 5 to 10 February the city of Grenoble in France. During five days, 500 young athletes coming from 19 countries participated in this multi winter sports event.

Countries: Germany, England, Argentina, France, Hungary, Russia, Republic of Belarus, Austria, Belgium, Serbia, Slovakia, Slovenia, Switzerland, Scotland, Chile, Turkey, Spain, Estonia and Ukraine.

Sports: alpine ski, freestyle ski, snowboard cross and freestyle, biathlon, cross country ski, ski jumping (all mentioned events were supported by FIS), curling, speed skating and hockey.

Main sports

- Alpine Skiing
- Biathlon
- Cross Country
- Snowboard

Demonstration Sports

- Speed Skating
- Ski Jumping
- Ice Hockey

== Recognized Sports ==
21 sports in 2015 and 31 in 2017 and 45 sports in 2025.

Team Sports

1. Basketball - 1973
2. Basketball 3x3 - 2014
3. Volleyball - 1972
4. Beach Volleyball - 2011
5. Football - 1972
6. Futsal - 2007
7. Handball - 1973
8. Rugby Sevens - 2000
9. Curling ‡
10. Ice Hockey ‡

Individual Sports

1. Alpine Skiing ‡
2. Biathlon ‡
3. Cross Country Skiing ‡
4. Figure Skating ‡
5. Ski Orienteering ‡
6. Snowboarding ‡
7. Artistic Gymnastics - 1974
8. Aerobic Gymnastics - 2013
9. Rhythmic Gymnastics - 2006
10. Athletics - 1973
11. Cross Country - 1975
12. Boxing - 2018
13. Fencing - 2016
14. Judo - 2013
15. Karate - 2013
16. Sambo - 2016
17. Taekwondo - 2015
18. Wrestling - 2015
19. Wushu - 2016
20. Para Athletics - 2022
21. Para Badminton - 2024
22. Para Judo - 2022
23. Para Swimming - 2022
24. Archery - 2016
25. Chess - 2013
26. Dance Sport - 2022
27. Golf - 2018
28. Jump Rope - 2022
29. Orienteering - 1987
30. Badminton - 1998
31. Tennis - 2003
32. Padel - 2024
33. Table Tennis - 1991
34. Surfing - 2018
35. Swimming - 1974

‡ No event but recognized in 2017

Not Recognized: Cycling and Petanque in 2018 Games.

Past Sports: Floorball, Baseball, Cricket, Triathlon

== Results ==
=== 2024 U18 ===
Rank	Nation	Gold	Silver	Bronze	Total
1	Brazil	53	61	50	164
2	China	39	26	25	90
3	Chinese Taipei	35	21	23	79
4	Romania	28	36	43	107
5	Iran	26	8	13	47
6	Ukraine	24	17	30	71
7	Azerbaijan	23	26	38	87
8	Hungary	20	16	26	62
9	United Arab Emirates	17	15	15	47
10	Morocco	16	12	16	44
11	United States	15	14	24	53
12	Algeria	14	12	24	50
13	Bahrain	13	21	32	66
14	France	12	11	6	29
15	Hong Kong	7	10	10	27
16	Kazakhstan	6	3	5	14
17	Greece	5	6	12	23
18	Turkey	4	12	22	38
19	Armenia	3	5	10	18
20	Canada	3	4	9	16
21	Thailand	3	1	5	9
22	Chile	3	1	0	4
23	Nepal	3	0	3	6
24	Argentina	2	3	2	7
25	Saudi Arabia	1	11	15	27
26	Mexico	1	4	9	14
27	India	1	4	5	10
28	Cyprus	1	2	5	8
29	Nigeria	1	2	0	3
29	Oman	1	2	0	3
31	Croatia	1	1	3	5
32	Italy	1	1	1	3
32	Poland	1	1	1	3
34	Slovenia	1	0	1	2
35	Uganda	0	2	1	3
36	Kuwait	0	2	0	2
37	Qatar	0	1	3	4
38	Egypt	0	1	2	3
39	Ivory Coast	0	1	1	2
40	Belgium	0	1	0	1
40	Puerto Rico	0	1	0	1
42	Bangladesh	0	0	1	1
42	England	0	0	1	1
42	Luxembourg	0	0	1	1
42	Malta	0	0	1	1
42	Mauritius	0	0	1	1
Totals (46 entries)		384	378	495	1,257

=== 2025 U15 ===
Rank	Nation	Gold	Silver	Bronze	Total
1	China	61	21	16	98
2	Ukraine	43	43	61	147
3	Brazil	38	42	57	137
4	Azerbaijan	33	23	28	84
5	Romania	32	41	48	121
6	Iran	29	32	25	86
7	Chinese Taipei	24	26	24	74
8	Turkey	16	22	26	64
9	England	11	10	11	32
10	Serbia	10	11	28	49
11	Thailand	9	12	23	44
12	United States	8	5	12	25
13	Kazakhstan	6	1	4	11
14	Croatia	4	4	1	9
15	India	2	6	4	12
16	Armenia	2	5	4	11
17	Argentina	2	4	1	7
18	Hungary	2	3	3	8
19	Bosnia and Herzegovina	2	0	0	2
20	Mongolia	1	4	5	10
21	Cyprus	1	4	4	9
22	Estonia	1	2	3	6
23	Slovakia	1	2	1	4
24	Italy	1	1	1	3
25	Canada	1	0	2	3
26	Chile	0	2	1	3
27	Mexico	0	1	9	10
28	Benin	0	0	4	4
28	Malta	0	0	4	4
30	Finland	0	0	3	3
31	Poland	0	0	2	2
31	Qatar	0	0	2	2
33	Bahrain	0	0	1	1
33	Belgium	0	0	1	1
33	Czech Republic	0	0	1	1
33	Guinea	0	0	1	1
33	Nepal	0	0	1	1
33	Uganda	0	0	1	1
Totals (38 entries)		340	327	423	1,090

== Sports ==
=== Summer sports ===
- 3x3 basketball
- Archery
- Athletics
- Badminton
- Basketball
- Boxing
- Chess
- Cycling
- Dancesport
- Fencing
- Football
- Golf
- Gymnastics
  - Aerobic gymnastics
  - Artistic gymnastics (2013, 2018, 2022, 2024)
  - Rhythmic gymnastics
- Judo
- Karate
- Orienteering
- Pétanque
- Surfing
- Swimming
- Taekwondo
- Table tennis
- Tennis
- Volleyball
- Wrestling
- Wushu

=== Winter sports ===
- Alpine skiing
- Biathlon
- Cross-country skiing
- Curling
- Freestyle skiing
- Ice hockey
- Ski jumping
- Snowboarding
- Speed skating

== Events Games ==
#	Events	First
1	ISF School U18 Summer Games	1974
2	ISF School U18 Winter Games	2018
3	ISF School U15 Summer Games	2021
4	ISF Combat Games	2017
5	ISF Inclusive Games	2019
6	ISF Educational Games	2014
7	ISF E-Sport Games	2019
8	ISF World Cool Games	2019
9	ISF Universal Teacher Games	2021
10	ISF Beach Games	2022
11	ISF She Runs	2019

=== ISF Combat Games ===
- 2017 ISF Combat Games consisted of four combat sports: Judo, Karate, Taekwondo and Wrestling.
- In 2017, 300 athletes from 6 countries (India, China, Russia, Brazil, UAE and France) attended the ISF Combat Games.

ISF Combat Games consist of the following sport disciplines:

- Judo
- Karate
- Taekwondo
- Wrestling

Edition	Year	City	Country	Date
1	2017	Agra	India	7–14 July
2	2019	Budapest	Hungary	16–20 June

From August 22–26, 2018, the first ever World Schools Championships in sambo took place in Oryol, Russian Federation.

Exclude Sambo and Boxing.

Source :

=== ISF Inclusive Games ===
First games in 2019.

- 2019 Póvoa de Varzim Portugal

=== ISF Educational Games ===
- 1st 2014 in Greece
- 2nd 2015 in Greece
- 3rd 2016 in Greece
- 4th 2017 in Greece
- 5th 2018 in Greece
- 6th 2019 in Greece
- 7th 2020 in Greece

=== ISF E-Sport Games ===
First games in 2019.

- 2019 Kiev Ukraine
- 2020 Kiev Ukraine
- 2021 Kiev Ukraine
- 2022 Kiev Ukraine

=== ISF World Cool Games ===
First games in 2019.

- 2019 Kiev Ukraine
- 2020 Kiev Ukraine
- 2021 Kiev Ukraine

=== ISF Universal Teacher Games ===
First games in 2021.

World Teacher Games 2025. May 5 - May 10. France.

=== ISF Beach Games ===
2020 Cancelled, 2022 Argentina.

=== ISF She Runs ===
ISF Active Girls' Lead

1st - 2019 Paris France

2nd - 2021 Brussels Belgium

=== Regional ===
==== Pan American ====
3rd Pan American Schools Games - Aracaju - Brazil 2017

==== European ====
First European Schools Games Caen, France 2–8 July 1992.

Quadrennial event introduced in 1992 to fill the void created by the reduction in frequency of the ISF World Gymnasiade from every 2 to every 4 years.

Both the 1996 and 2000 events are believed to have been cancelled.

Venues: 1992 Caen (FRA), 2004 Milan (ITA)

== World School Championship ==
ISF International School Sport Federation World School Championship.

== See also ==
- FINA Youth World Swimming Championships
- Junior World Gymnastics Championships
- SELL Student Games
- Universiade
- Youth Olympic Games
- World Youth Championships in Athletics
