= Jaelyn Chin =

American rhythmic gymnast (born 2007)

- Born: 24 December 2007 (age 18) Texas

Gymnastics career
- Discipline: Rhythmic gymnastics
- Country represented: United States; (2022–present)
- Club: Bessonova’s schhol
Medal record
Representing United States
Rhythmic gymnastics
Pacific Rim Championships
Gold medal – first place	2024 Cali	Team
Gold medal – first place	2024 Cali	Ball
Silver medal – second place	2024 Cali	All-Around
Silver medal – second place	2024 Cali	Hoop
Silver medal – second place	2024 Cali	Clubs
Pan American Championships
Silver medal – second place	2024 Ciudad de Guatemala	Team
Junior Pan American Championships
Gold medal – first place	2022 Rio de Janeiro	Team
Silver medal – second place	2022 Rio de Janeiro	Ball
Silver medal – second place	2022 Rio de Janeiro	Clubs
Bronze medal – third place	2022 Rio de Janeiro	All-Around

Jaelyn Dana Mingsum Chin (born 24 December 2007) is an American rhythmic gymnast. She's a multiple Pan American medalist and the 2023 national hoop champion.

== Career ==
In 2022 she debuted internationally at the Pan American Championships in Rio de Janeiro, winning gold in teams along Rin Keys, Megan Chu and Kseniya Pototski, as well as silver with ball and clubs and bronze in the All-Around. That same year she became the national All-Around, clubs and ribbon champion, also winning silver with hoop and ball.

The following year she became a senior, competing at the Fellnach-Schmiden Tournament where she was 6th in the All-Around, with hoop and clubs, 4th with ball and 5th with ribbon. At the World Cup in Sofia she ended 24th in the All-Around, 22nd with hoop, 18th with ball, 23rd with clubs and 19th with ribbon. At the stage in Tashkent she took 22nd place in the All-Around, 31st with hoop, 9th with ball, 31st with clubs and 16th with ribbon.

In April 2024 she competed at the Pacific Rim Championships in Cali, winning gold in teams and silver in the All-Around.
