= Natalie de la Rosa =

American rhythmic gymnast (born 2010)

- Born: 22 September 2010 (age 16) Santa Monica, California, U.S.

Gymnastics career
- Discipline: Rhythmic gymnastics
- Country represented: United States; (2022–)
- Club: Burlo Gymnastics
- Head coach: Jenya Tkachenko
- Assistant coaches: Anastasiya Ivankova, Karina Lykhvar
Medal record
Representing United States
Rhythmic gymnastics
Pan American Championships
Silver medal – second place	2026 Rio de Janeiro	Team
Bronze medal – third place	2026 Rio de Janeiro	All-Around
Junior World Championships
Silver medal – second place	2025 Sofia	Team
Bronze medal – third place	2025 Sofia	Hoop
Junior Pacific Rim Championships
Gold medal – first place	2024 Cali	Team
Gold medal – first place	2024 Cali	All-Around
Gold medal – first place	2024 Cali	Ball
Silver medal – second place	2024 Cali	Ribbon
Silver medal – second place	2024 Cali	Clubs
Junior Pan American Championships
Gold medal – first place	2024 Ciudad de Guatemala	Team
Gold medal – first place	2024 Ciudad de Guatemala	All-Around
Gold medal – first place	2024 Ciudad de Guatemala	Ball
Gold medal – first place	2025 Asunción	Team
Gold medal – first place	2025 Asunción	All-Around
Gold medal – first place	2025 Asunción	Hoop
Gold medal – first place	2025 Asunción	Ball
Gold medal – first place	2025 Asunción	Clubs
Gold medal – first place	2025 Asunción	Ribbon
Junior Pan American Games
Gold medal – first place	2025 Asunción	All-around
Gold medal – first place	2025 Asunción	Hoop
Silver medal – second place	2025 Asunción	Ball
Bronze medal – third place	2025 Asunción	Clubs
Bronze medal – third place	2025 Asunción	Ribbon

Natalie de la Rosa (born 22 September 2010) is an American rhythmic gymnast. She represents the United States in international competitions. She is a silver medalist in team and bronze in hoop of the 2025 Junior World Championships and a two-time (2024, 2025) Junior Pan American all-around champion.

== Personal life ==
De la Rosa began gymnastics at age four. A coach suggested that she try rhythmic gymnastics, on account of her back flexibility. She has two brothers, Brando and Elliott.

== Career ==
=== Junior ===
==== 2023 ====
De la Rosa debuted as a Junior Elite in 2023, debuting at the Aprodite Cup, topping the All-Around for the girls born in 2010 and finishing 6th in the ball final. In April, she finished 10th in the All-Around and 8th in clubs at the international tournament in Sofia. At the USA Gymnastics Championships in Tulsa, she finished 4th in the All-Around and won silver in clubs.

==== 2024 ====
In 2024, she competed in the Aphrodite Cup in Athens, winning silver in the ribbon final. In late April she was selected for the Pacific Rim in Cali, winning gold in the team final alongside Jaelyn Chin, Isabella Chong, Megan Chu, Yana Golovan and Dawn Kim. Individually, she won gold in the All-Around, ball and ribbon finals, as well as silver in clubs. A week later she won gold in the All-Around, with ball and ribbon as well as silver with hoop at the Gdynia Rhythmic Stars. She was then selected for the Pan American Championships in Guatemala City, there she was the gold medalist in teams, All-Around and with ball.

==== 2025 ====
In March 2025 she won bronze with hoop and ball, as well as silver with ribbon and gold with clubs, at the Aphrodite Cup. At the 2025 Pan American Championships she won six gold medals in team, all-around and in all apparatus finals. In June, she was selected to participate in the 2025 Junior World Championships, held in Bulgarian capital, Sofia. She helped Team USA won team silver, the first team medal won by the U.S. at rhythmic World Championships. She also won bronze in hoop, with a score 26.450. In August she competed at the Junior Pan American Games in Asunción, winning gold in the All-Around. In apparatus finals, she won gold in hoop, silver in ball and bronze medals in clubs and ribbon.

=== Senior ===
==== 2026 ====
In May, she took 4th place in all-around at Gdynia Rhythmic Stars tournament. She won bronze medal in clubs, and took 4th place in hoop and ribbon finals. On May 15-17, she competed at Portimão World Challenge Cup, taking 12th place in all-around. She qualified to two apparatus finals, finishing 5th in hoop and 7th in ribbon.

In June, she represented United States alongside Megan Chu at the 2026 Pan American Championships in Rio de Janeiro, Brazil. They won silver medal in team competition, while Natalie took bronze in all-around behind Megan Chu. Then she won bronze medal in all-around at her first senior USA National Championships, held in Tulsa, Oklahoma. In apparatus finals, she won gold medal in clubs, and silver medals in hoop, ball and ribbon.

== Routine music information ==
Year	Apparatus	Music title
2026	Hoop	Crowd Caffeine by SOFIA ISELLA
2026	Ball	No Good by KALEO
2026	Clubs	We Will Find It by Emily Glass, Dasychira
2026	Ribbon	Leather for Hell by Bitter Ruin
2024/2025	Hoop	House of the Rising Sun by Jeremy Renner
2024/2025	Ball	Money, Money, Money (From Mamma Mia! Original Motion Picture Soundtrack) by Meryl Streep, Julie Walters, Christine Baranski
2024/2025	Clubs	The Shape of Lies by Eternal Eclipse
2024/2025	Ribbon	Wild by LOLO
