= Megan Chu =

American rhythmic gymnast (born 2008)

- Nickname: Chuchu
- Born: 25 February 2008 (age 18) California, U.S.

Gymnastics career
- Discipline: Rhythmic gymnastics
- Country represented: United States; (2021–present)
- Club: Pacific Stars Rhythmic Academy
- Head coach: Svitlana Prokopova
- Assistant coach: Daria Farshbafshakhriiari
Medal record
Representing United States
Rhythmic gymnastics
Event	1st	2nd	3rd
FIG World Challenge Cup	0	0	1
Grand Prix	1	2	3
Total	1	2	4
Pacific Rim Championships
Gold medal – first place	2024 Cali	Team
Gold medal – first place	2024 Cali	All-Around
Gold medal – first place	2024 Cali	Hoop
Gold medal – first place	2024 Cali	Clubs
Gold medal – first place	2024 Cali	Ribbon
Silver medal – second place	2024 Cali	Ball
Pan American Championships
Gold medal – first place	2025 Asunción	Team
Gold medal – first place	2025 Asunción	Hoop
Gold medal – first place	2025 Asunción	Ribbon
Gold medal – first place	2026 Rio de Janeiro	Ball
Silver medal – second place	2024 Ciudad de Guatemala	Team
Silver medal – second place	2026 Rio de Janeiro	Team
Silver medal – second place	2026 Rio de Janeiro	All-Around
Silver medal – second place	2026 Rio de Janeiro	Ribbon
Bronze medal – third place	2024 Ciudad de Guatemala	Hoop
Bronze medal – third place	2024 Ciudad de Guatemala	Ball
Bronze medal – third place	2025 Asunción	Ball
Bronze medal – third place	2026 Rio de Janeiro	Hoop
Bronze medal – third place	2026 Rio de Janeiro	Clubs
Junior Pan American Championships
Gold medal – first place	2021 Guatemala City	Team
Gold medal – first place	2021 Guatemala City	All-Around
Gold medal – first place	2021 Guatemala City	Hoop
Gold medal – first place	2021 Guatemala City	Clubs
Gold medal – first place	2021 Guatemala City	Ribbon
Gold medal – first place	2022 Rio de Janeiro	Team
Gold medal – first place	2022 Rio de Janeiro	Hoop
Gold medal – first place	2023 Guadalajara	Team
Gold medal – first place	2023 Guadalajara	Ribbon
Silver medal – second place	2021 Guatemala City	Ball
Silver medal – second place	2023 Guadalajara	All-Around
Silver medal – second place	2023 Guadalajara	Ball
Silver medal – second place	2023 Guadalajara	Clubs
Bronze medal – third place	2022 Rio de Janeiro	Clubs

Megan Chu (born 25 February 2008) is an American rhythmic gymnast. She is the 2026 Pan American all-around Silver medalist. On junior level, she is the 2021 Pan American all-around champion and the 2023 Pan American all-around silver medalist.

== Personal life ==
She has one sister Melody. She is going to California Online Public School.

== Career ==
She took up the sport in 2012 at the age of 4.

=== Junior ===
Chu joined the junior national team in 2021. Chu competed at the 2021 Junior Pan American Rhythmic Gymnastics Championships, where she won team gold, gold in the all-around, hoop, clubs and ribbon and silver with ball.

The following year, she won team gold, gold with hoop as well as bronze with clubs at the Pan American Championships.

In 2023, at the Pan American Championships in Guadalajara, she won team gold, gold with ribbon, silver in the all-around and with ball. In July, she was selected for the Junior World Championships in Cluj-Napoca along with Rin Keys and the junior group. The team finished in 11th place, and Chu was 8th in the ball final.

=== Senior ===
==== 2024 ====
In 2024 she became a senior. In February, she competed in her first Grand Prix and won a silver medal in the Ribbon final. In April she competed at the Pacific Rim Championships in Cali, winning gold in teams and the All-Around. In her first senior Pan American Championships she earned a bronze medal in the hoop and ball finals. At the end of September, Chu, along with her teammates Rin Keys and Natalia de la Rosa, participated in the international club competition Aeon Cup in Japan, where they won a historic gold medal ahead of the Ukrainian and Italian teams. She placed 5th in the All-Around.

==== 2025 ====
In 2025, she started her competition season in Tartu, Estonia, at Miss Valentine Grand Prix and won bronze medal in All-around. She also won gold medal in ribbon, silver in hoop and bronze in ball and clubs finals. On 4-6 April, she competed at 2025 World Cup Sofia and took 8th place in the all-around and advanced into ribbon final, where she ended on 7th place. On May 9-11, she competed at World Challenge Cup Portimão and took 6th place in all-around. She also won bronze in hoop final.

At the 2025 Pan American Championships in June, she took 4th place in the all-around. She won the gold medal in the team competition together with Rin Keys and three more individual medals in the apparatus finals: gold with hoop and ribbon and bronze with ball. On June 20-22, Chu competed at the USA National Championships and won silver medal in the all-around behind Rin Keys. In July, she competed at the Milan World Cup, where she took 8th place in the all-around. On July 25-27, she competed at the Cluj-Napoca World Challenge Cup and finished on 15th place in the all-around.

In August, she made her World Championships debut in Rio de Janeiro, Brazil, where she took 16th place in all-around qualifications and advanced into the all-around final, where she ended on 12th place.

==== 2026 ====
In 2026, Chu started the season competing at the Marbella Grand Prix in March. She took 10th place in the all-around. She was 5th in clubs and 7th in the ribbon final. In April, she competed at the Baku World Cup and ended 19th place in the all-around.

In June, she represented the United States alongside Natalie de la Rosa at the 2026 Pan American Championships in Rio de Janeiro, Brazil. Later in June, she won the silver medal in the all-around at USA National Championships, held in Tulsa, Oklahoma. In the apparatus finals, she won gold in hoop and bronze medals in ball and clubs. She ended in 4th place with the ribbon.

In August, she was selected to represent the United States at the 2026 World Championships in Frankfurt, Germany, alongside Rin Keys and the senior group. She qualified for the all-around final and finished one place higher than she had the year before, in 11th. She qualified for hoop, clubs and ribbon finals, finishing 6th, 8th and 5th respectively; additionally, she finished 8th in the team ranking with her teammates.

Later in the year, she competed at the Aeon Cup in Tokyo, with her teammates Rin Keys and Anna Filipp. They represented the Burlo/Pacific club, which won the silver medal behind Sky Grace. In the senior all-around, Chu won a bronze medal behind Sofia Ilteriakova and Mariia Borisova.

== Competitive highlights ==
Year	Event	Team	AA	Hoop	Ball	Clubs	Ribb.
International
2026	Aeon Cup	2nd	3rd				

== Routine music information ==
Year	Apparatus	Music Title
2026	Hoop	Bang That Drum by DJ Aligator, Copenhagen Drummers
2026	Ball	CHEKELELE (Extended Mix) by JETFIRE & MEITAL DE RAZON & EYAL DAN
2026	Clubs	San Sanana by Anu Malik, Alka Yagnik, Hema Sardesai
2026	Ribbon	Belleville Rendez-Vous by Robert Wells
2025	Hoop	Goodbye Peggy Sue by The Baseballs
2025	Ball	Scat by Club des Belugas, Iain Mackenzie
2025	Clubs	San Sanana by Anu Malik, Alka Yagnik, Hema Sardesai
2025	Ribbon	Belleville Rendez-Vous by Robert Wells
2024	Hoop	Fantasy On Ice by Sarah Àlainn
2024	Ball	Scat by Club des Belugas, Iain Mackenzie
2024	Clubs	Stanga by Sagi Abitbul & Guy Haliva
2024	Ribbon	Belleville Rendez-Vous by Robert Wells
2023	Hoop	Fantasy On Ice by Sarah Àlainn
2023	Ball	Se Dice De Mí (from Betty La Fea) by Yolanda Rayo
2023	Clubs	Stanga by Sagi Abitbul & Guy Haliva
2023	Ribbon	Done by Frankie Moreno
