= 2024 Summer Gymnasiade =

Multi-sport event in Manama, Bahrain

- Host: Manama
- Country: Bahrain
- Athletes: 5.510 from 67 countries and regions
- Opening: 23 October
- Closing: 31 October

The 2024 Summer Gymnasiade was the 20th edition held in Manama Capital of Bahrain from 23 to 31 October 2024.

== Sports ==
- Archery ()
- Athletics ()
  - Para-athletics
- Aquatics ()
  - Swimming ()
  - Para swimming
- Badminton ()
  - Para badminton
- Basketball 3x3 ()
- Boxing ()
- Chess ()
- Dancesport ()
- Fencing ()
- Gymnastics ()
  - Aerobic gymnastics
  - Artistic gymnastics
  - Rhythmic gymnastics
- Handball ()
- Judo ()
  - Para judo
- Karate ()
- Orienteering ()
- Padel ()
- Tennis ()
  - Table tennis ()
- Taekwondo ()
- Wrestling ()

== Participating nations ==
Participating nations of 2024 Summer Gymnasiade
- Algeria
- Argentina
- Armenia
- Austria
- Azerbaijan
- Bahrain (Host)
- Bangladesh
- Belgium
- Benin
- Brazil
- Bulgaria
- Cameroon
- Chile
- China
- Ivory Coast
- Croatia
- Cyprus
- Czech Republic
- Egypt
- England
- Estonia
- France
- Greece
- Hong Kong
- Hungary
- India
- Iran
- Italy
- Jordan
- Kazakhstan
- Kuwait
- Luxembourg
- Malawi
- Mali
- Malta
- Mauritius
- Mexico
- Moldova
- Mongolia
- Montenegro
- Morocco
- Namibia
- Nepal
- Nigeria
- North Macedonia
- Oman
- Pakistan
- Philippines
- Poland
- Puerto Rico
- Qatar
- Quebec
- Republika Srpska
- Romania
- Sierra Leone
- Saudi Arabia
- Slovenia
- South Africa
- Switzerland
- Chinese Taipei
- Tajikistan
- Thailand
- Togo
- Turkey
- Uganda
- Ukraine
- United Arab Emirates
- United States

== Medal table ==
Rank	Nation	Gold	Silver	Bronze	Total
1	Brazil	53	61	50	164
2	China	39	26	25	90
3	Chinese Taipei	35	21	23	79
4	Romania	28	36	43	107
5	Iran	26	8	13	47
6	Ukraine	24	17	30	71
7	Azerbaijan	23	26	38	87
8	Hungary	20	16	26	62
9	United Arab Emirates	17	15	15	47
10	Morocco	16	12	16	44
11	United States	15	14	24	53
12	Algeria	14	12	24	50
13	Bahrain	13	21	32	66
14	France	12	11	6	29
15	Hong Kong	7	10	10	27
16	Kazakhstan	6	3	5	14
17	Greece	5	6	12	23
18	Turkey	4	12	22	38
19	Armenia	3	5	10	18
20	Canada	3	4	9	16
21	Thailand	3	1	5	9
22	Chile	3	1	0	4
23	Nepal	3	0	3	6
24	Argentina	2	3	2	7
25	Saudi Arabia	1	11	15	27
26	Mexico	1	4	9	14
27	India	1	4	5	10
28	Cyprus	1	2	5	8
29	Nigeria	1	2	0	3
29	Oman	1	2	0	3
31	Croatia	1	1	3	5
32	Italy	1	1	1	3
32	Poland	1	1	1	3
34	Slovenia	1	0	1	2
35	Uganda	0	2	1	3
36	Kuwait	0	2	0	2
37	Qatar	0	1	3	4
38	Egypt	0	1	2	3
39	Ivory Coast	0	1	1	2
40	Belgium	0	1	0	1
40	Puerto Rico	0	1	0	1
42	Bangladesh	0	0	1	1
42	England	0	0	1	1
42	Luxembourg	0	0	1	1
42	Malta	0	0	1	1
42	Mauritius	0	0	1	1
Totals (46 entries)		384	378	495	1,257
