= Maria Flávia Britto =

Brazilian rhythmic gymnast (born 2005)

- Full name: Maria Flávia Barros De Mello Britto
- Born: October 30, 2005 (age 20) Aracaju, Brazil

Gymnastics career
- Discipline: Rhythmic gymnastics
- Country represented: Brazil (2019-present)
- Club: Colégio Jardins
- Head coach: Camila Ferezin
- Assistant coach: Iracema Alves
Medal record
Rhythmic gymnastics
Representing Brazil
Pan American Championships
| Silver medal – second place | 2022 Rio de Janeiro | Team |
South American Championships
| Gold medal – first place | 2023 Barranquilla | All-around team |
| Gold medal – first place | 2023 Barranquilla | Group all-around |
| Gold medal – first place | 2023 Barranquilla | 5 hoops |
| Gold medal – first place | 2023 Barranquilla | 3 ribbons + 2 balls |
| Gold medal – first place | 2025 Cochabamba | Duo + Trio |
| Bronze medal – third place | 2025 Cochabamba | Duo |
South American Cup
| Gold medal – first place | 2026 Asunción | Team |
| Gold medal – first place | 2026 Asunción | All-Around Team |
| Silver medal – second place | 2026 Asunción | All-Around |
| Silver medal – second place | 2026 Asunción | Hoop |
| Silver medal – second place | 2026 Asunción | Ribbon |

Maria Flávia Barros De Mello Britto (born 30 October 2005) is a Brazilian rhythmic gymnast. She represents Brazil in international competitions.

== Career ==
=== Junior ===
In 2019 Britto became the national junior champion and took part in the selection for the Junior World Championships in Moscow.

=== Senior ===
Britto became age-eligible for senior competitions in 2021, competing in for the first time among seniors at the Brazilian Championships.

In March of the following year she won gold with hoop, silver in the All-Around, with ball and in teams at the national selection for the 2022 Gymnasiade. In Normandy she was 9th overall. The following month she was selected for the Pan American Championships in Rio de Janeiro, being 7th with hoop, 6th with ball and won silver in teams along Geovanna Santos, Ana Luísa Neiva and Mariana Vitória Gonçalves. At nationals she was 7th in the All-Around, 4th with ball, 4th with clubs and 9th with ribbon. In October she competed in the South American Games in Asunción, finishing 12th in the All-Around and not advancing to the final.

In 2023, Britto was incorporated into the national senior group. In October she was selected for the South American Championships where she won gold in the All-Around, with 5 hoops, with 3 ribbons and 2 balls and in teams along with Victória Borges, Julia Kurunczi, Gabriella Coradine, Mariana Vitória Gonçalves, Maria Fernanda Moraes and individuals Maria Eduarda Alexandre, Ana Luísa Neiva, Thainá Ramos.

At the 2024 Brazilian group championships she was 15th with 2 balls. In June 2025 she took 10th place in the All-Around at nationals, also being 6th with hoop and 7the with ribbon. In September she was selected for the South American Championships in Cochabamba, there she won bronze in with 2 balls along Maria Clara Fabri, as well as gold in duo & trio (with Isadora Beduschi, Kendra Ávila and Nathália Nogueira).

In April 2026 she participated in the Sofia Cup in Bulgaria, being 17th in the All-Around.
