= Keila Santos =

Brazilian rhythmic gymnast

- Full name: Keila Souza Santos
- Born: May 2, 2008 (age 18) Salvador, Bahia

Gymnastics career
- Discipline: Rhythmic gymnastics
- Country represented: Brazil (2022-)
- Club: Centro de Treinamento de Ginástica Olímpica e Rítmica
- Head coach: Camila Ferezin
- Former coach: Joseane Coelho
Medal record
Rhythmic gymnastics
Representing Brazil
South American Championships
Gold medal – first place	2022 Paipa	Team
Gold medal – first place	2023 Asunción	Team
Gold medal – first place	2024 Santiago	Team
Gold medal – first place	2024 Santiago	All-Around Team
Silver medal – second place	2022 Paipa	Ball
Silver medal – second place	2023 Asunción	Clubs
Bronze medal – third place	2023 Asunción	All-Around
Bronze medal – third place	2023 Asunción	Hoop
Bronze medal – third place	2023 Asunción	Ribbon
Pan American Gymnastics Championships
Gold medal – first place	2025 Asunción	Group All-Around
Gold medal – first place	2025 Asunción	5 Ribbons
Gold medal – first place	2025 Asunción	3 Balls & 2 Hoops
Junior Pan American Championships
Silver medal – second place	2022 Rio de Janeiro	Team
Bronze medal – third place	2023 Guadalajara	Team
Bronze medal – third place	2023 Guadalajara	Hoop

Keila Souza Santos (born 2 May 2008) is a Brazilian rhythmic gymnast. She represents her country in international competitions.

== Career ==
Santos made her international debut at the South American Championships, where she won silver in the 13 years old category. Inearly July 2022 she was selected, as a junior, for the Pan American Championships in Rio de Janeiro. There she won silver in team along with Maria Eduarda Alexandre, Isadora Oliveira and Emanuelle Felberk. In December she competed in the South American Championships in Paipa, winning gold in teams (along with Maria Eduarda Alexandre and Isadora Oliveira) as well as silver with ball.

A year later, Santos took part in the 2023 Pan American Championships in Guadalajara along with Fernanda Alvaz, Letícia Evangelista and the national junior group, winning bronze in teams and with hoop. In July she was selected for the Junior World Championships in Cluj-Napoca, along with Fernanda Alvaz and the junior group, where she competed with hoop and clubs, taking 25th and 16th place with apparatuses and 12th in teams. Weeks later she won silver in teams, in the All-Around, with hoop and with ball at the Brazilian Championships. In November she won gold in teams, along with Fernanda Alvaz and Júlia Bessa, silver with clubs and bronze in the All-Around, with hoop and with ribbon at the Junior South American Championships in Asunción.

Santos became a senior in 2024, winning bronze in the ball final at the Brazilian Championships. In December she participated in the selection for the new Brazilian senior group. A week later it was revealed she was selected to integrate the group.

In May 2025 it was revealed she was selected for the Pan American Championships in Asunción, along Julia Kurunczi, Lavinia Silvério, Maria Fernanda Moraes, Marianne Giovacchini, Rhayane Vitoria Ferreira Brum.
