= Emiliana Vargas =

Colombian rhythmic gymnast

- Full name: Emiliana Vargas Silva
- Born: 30 June 2009 (age 17) Bogotá

Gymnastics career
- Discipline: Rhythmic gymnastics
- Country represented: Colombia (2022-)
- Head coach: Alla Dimchoglo
Medal record
Rhythmic gymnastics
Representing Colombia
Central American and Caribbean Games
Bronze medal – third place	2026 Santo Domingo	Team
South American Championships
Silver medal – second place	2022 Paipa	Age Group Team
Bronze medal – third place	2022 Paipa	Age Group Ribbon
Bronze medal – third place	2026 Asunción	Team
Bronze medal – third place	2026 Asunción	Ball
Bolivarian Games
Gold medal – first place	2025 Peru	Team
Bronze medal – third place	2025 Peru	Hoop
Junior South American Championships
Silver medal – second place	2023 Asunción	Ribbon
Pacific Rim Championships
Bronze medal – third place	2024 Cali	Team

Emiliana Vargas Silva (born 30 June 2009) is a Colombian rhythmic gymnast. She represents Colombia in international competitions.

== Career ==
In late 2022 Vargas competed in the age group (13 years old) category at the South American Championships in Paipa, winning silver in teams, with Sara Correa and Salome Muñoz, as well as bronze with ribbon.

=== Junior ===
In May 2023 she took part in the national championships, earning the chance to represent Colombia at the Junior Worlds and at the Pan Am Championships. In early June she was 7th in teams, 12th in the All-Around and 8th in the hoop final at the Pan American Championships in Guadalajara. At the 2nd Junior World Championships in Cluj-Napoca she competed with hoop and ribbon, being 51st with both apparatuses. Later in the year she represented the Bogotá region at the national games and won silver with ribbon at the South American Championships in Asunción.

In April 2024 she participated in the Pacific Rim Championships in Cali, taking 10th place overall, 11th with hoop, 8th with ball, 12th with clubs, 20th with ribbon and won bronze in teams (along Sara Correa, Vanessa Galindo, Luna Henao, Juliana Villareal and Oriana Viñas). In June she was selected for the Pan American Championships in Ciudad de Guatemala, being 8th in teams, 16th with ball, 15th with clubs and 16th with ribbon. In November she was crowned national champion.

=== Senior ===
Vargas became age eligible for senior competitions in 2025, making her international debut at the South American Championships in Cochabamba, being 6th in teams (with Maria Salome Ricaurte and Juliana Villareal) and 12th in the All-Around. In December she competed in the Bolivarian Games in Peru, winning gold in teams, along Natalia Dreszer and Oriana Viñas, as well as bronze with hoop.
