= Fernanda Alvaz =

Brazilian rhythmic gymnast (born 2009)

- Full name: Fernanda Regalo Alvaz
- Born: March 23, 2009 (age 17) São Paulo

Gymnastics career
- Discipline: Rhythmic gymnastics
- Country represented: Brazil; (2022–)
Medal record
Rhythmic gymnastics
Representing Brazil
South American Cup
Gold medal – first place	2025 Cochabamba	Team
Gold medal – first place	2025 Cochabamba	All-Around Team
Gold medal – first place	2026 Asunción	Team
Gold medal – first place	2026 Asunción	All-Around
Gold medal – first place	2026 Asunción	Hoop
Silver medal – second place	2025 Cochabamba	All-Around
Silver medal – second place	2026 Asunción	Clubs
Junior Pan American Championships
Silver medal – second place	2024 Ciudad de Guatemala	Team
Silver medal – second place	2024 Ciudad de Guatemala	Clubs
Bronze medal – third place	2023 Guadalajara	Team
Bronze medal – third place	2024 Ciudad de Guatemala	Ball

Fernanda Regalo Alvaz (born 23 March 2009) is a Brazilian rhythmic gymnast. She represents her country in international competitions.

== Career ==
Alvaz made her international debut in early December 2022, her first year as a junior, when she was selected for the South American Championships in Paipa. A few days before the championship she was invited along with Maria Eduarda Alexandre and Keila Souza to a training stage to upgrade the level of rhythmic gymnastics in America. In Colombia, in the 13–14 years old category, she won silver in the All-Around behind teammate Renata Diniz as well as gold in teams and with ribbon. In mid-December she participated in a training camp for young gymnast held by the Brazilian federation.

A year later she took part in the Pan American Championships in Guadalajara along with Keila Santos, Letícia Evangelista and the national junior group, winning bronze in teams. In July she was selected for the Junior World Championships in Cluj-Napoca, along with Keila Santos and the junior group, where she competed with ball and ribbon, taking 19th and 35th place with apparatuses and 12th in teams. Weeks later she won gold in the All-Around, with hoop, ball and clubs as well as silver with ribbon at the Brazilian Championships.

In 2024 Alvaz competed at the Pan American Championships in Guatemala City. She was 4th in the All-Around and won silver in teams, along with Sarah Mourão, Gabriela Cunha and Stefhany Popoatzki, and with clubs and bronze with ball. In July she won silver in team, the All-Around, hoop and ball as well as silver with clubs and ribbon at the Brazilian Junior Championships.
