= 2022 South American Rhythmic Gymnastics Championships =

Rhythmic Gymnastics competition

- Location: Paipa, Colombia
- Start date: 28 November 2022
- End date: 04 December 2022

The 2022 South American Rhythmic Gymnastics Championships were held in Paipa, Colombia, from November 28 to December 4, 2022. The competition was organized by the Colombian Gymnastics Federation and approved by the International Gymnastics Federation.

== Medalists ==
=== Senior ===
Event	Gold	Silver	Bronze
Team all-around	Brazil; Bárbara Domingos; Andressa Jardim; Viviane Miranda; Geovanna Santos	Argentina; Celeste D'Arcángelo; Martina Gil; Lara Granero; Agostina Vargas Re	Colombia; Vanessa Galindo; Nathalia Hurtado; Oriana Viñas
Individual all-around	Bárbara Domingos (BRA)	Geovanna Santos (BRA)	Celeste D'Arcángelo (ARG)
Hoop	Geovanna Santos (BRA)	Oriana Viñas (COL)	Javiera Rubilar (CHI)
Ball	Bárbara Domingos (BRA)	Celeste D'Arcángelo (ARG)	Martina Gil (ARG)
Clubs	Celeste D'Arcángelo (ARG)	Bárbara Domingos (BRA)	Geovanna Santos (BRA)
Ribbon	Geovanna Santos (BRA)	Celeste D'Arcángelo (ARG)	Bárbara Domingos (BRA)
Group all-around	Brazil; Maria Eduarda Arakaki; Victória Borges; Barbara Urquiza; Sofia Pereira; Giovanna Oliveira; Nicole Pírcio	Argentina; Milagros Centeno; Evangelina Cordier; Karema Jara; Agustina Luján; Ludmila Miravet; Macarena Rodríguez	Colombia; Karen Duarte; Paula Flechas; Natalia Jiménez; Adriana Mantilla; Kizzy Rivas; Isabella Salazar
Group 5 hoops	Brazil; Maria Eduarda Arakaki; Victória Borges; Barbara Urquiza; Sofia Pereira; Giovanna Oliveira; Nicole Pírcio	Chile; Valentina Cuello; Martina Inostroza; Isabel Lozano; Josefina Romero; Anneli Sepúlveda	Argentina; Milagros Centeno; Evangelina Cordier; Karema Jara; Agustina Luján; Ludmila Miravet; Macarena Rodríguez
Group 3 ribbons + 2 balls	Brazil; Maria Eduarda Arakaki; Victória Borges; Barbara Urquiza; Sofia Pereira; Giovanna Oliveira; Nicole Pírcio	Argentina; Milagros Centeno; Evangelina Cordier; Karema Jara; Agustina Luján; Ludmila Miravet; Macarena Rodríguez	Colombia; Karen Duarte; Paula Flechas; Natalia Jiménez; Adriana Mantilla; Kizzy Rivas; Isabella Salazar
All-around team	Brazil; Bárbara Domingos; Andressa Jardim; Viviane Miranda; Geovanna Santos; Maria Eduarda Arakaki; Victória Borges; Barbara Urquiza; Sofia Pereira; Giovanna Oliveira; Nicole Pírcio	Argentina; Celeste D'Arcángelo; Martina Gil; Lara Granero; Agostina Vargas Re; Milagros Centeno; Evangelina Cordier; Karema Jara; Agustina Luján; Ludmila Miravet; Macarena Rodríguez	Colombia; Vanessa Galindo; Nathalia Hurtado; Oriana Viñas; Karen Duarte; Paula Flechas; Natalia Jiménez; Adriana Mantilla; Kizzy Rivas; Isabella Salazar

=== Age group ===
Event	Gold	Silver	Bronze
Team all-around	Brazil; Fernanda Alvaz; Julia Bessa; Renata Diniz	Colombia; Sara Correa; Emiliana Vargas; Salome Muñoz	Argentina; Camila Arce; Livia Bustos; Pilar Montenegro
Individual all-around	Renata Diniz (BRA)	Fernanda Alvaz (BRA)	Thaycaramaloa Arias (VEN)
Hoop	Renata Diniz (BRA)	Fernanda Alvaz (BRA)	Thaycaramaloa Arias (VEN)
Ball	Julia Bessa (BRA)	Renata Diniz (BRA)	Pilar Montenegro (ARG)
Ribbon	Fernanda Alvaz (BRA)	Renata Diniz (BRA)	Emiliana Vargas (COL)

=== Junior ===
Event	Gold	Silver	Bronze
Team all-around	Brazil; Maria Eduarda Alexandre; Isadora Oliveira; Keila Santos	Colombia; Maria Bedoya; Helena Londoño; Olivia Medina; Laura Patiño	Venezuela; Jimena Dominguez; Maria Victoria Escobar; Gabriela Rodríguez
Individual all-around	Maria Eduarda Alexandre (BRA)	Isadora Oliveira (BRA)	Olivia Medina (COL)
Hoop	Maria Eduarda Alexandre (BRA)	Isadora Oliveira (BRA)	Olivia Medina (COL)
Ball	Maria Eduarda Alexandre (BRA)	Keila Santos (BRA)	Ana Laura Acosta (ARG)
Clubs	Maria Eduarda Alexandre (BRA)	Isadora Oliveira (BRA)	Ana Laura Acosta (ARG)
Ribbon	Maria Eduarda Alexandre (BRA)	Gabriela Rodríguez (VEN)	Isadora Oliveira (BRA)
Group all-around	Brazil; Isadora Beduschi; Maria Paula Caminha; Laura Gamboa; Yumi Rodrigues; Lavinia Silvério; Ana Luiza Souza	Argentina; Lara Aimeri; Lucia Arrascaeta; Lucia González; Morena Martinengo; Victoria Torres	Colombia; Geraldine Castaño; María del Mar Quiroga; Salome Jiménez; Mariana Joyas; Luciana Lombana; Isabella Rengifo
Group 5 ropes	Brazil; Isadora Beduschi; Maria Paula Caminha; Laura Gamboa; Yumi Rodrigues; Lavinia Silvério; Ana Luiza Souza	Chile; Sofía Delgado; Amanda Depaux; Belén Diaz; Leonor Fuente-Alba; Karime Meneses	Argentina; Lara Aimeri; Lucia Arrascaeta; Lucia González; Morena Martinengo; Victoria Torres
Group 5 balls	Brazil; Isadora Beduschi; Maria Paula Caminha; Laura Gamboa; Yumi Rodrigues; Lavinia Silvério; Ana Luiza Souza	Argentina; Lara Aimeri; Lucia Arrascaeta; Lucia González; Morena Martinengo; Victoria Torres	Colombia; Geraldine Castaño; María del Mar Quiroga; Salome Jiménez; Mariana Joyas; Luciana Lombana; Isabella Rengifo
All-around team	Brazil; Maria Eduarda Alexandre; Isadora Beduschi; Keila Santos; Isadora Beduschi; Maria Paula Caminha; Laura Gamboa; Yumi Rodrigues; Lavinia Silvério; Ana Luiza Souza	Argentina; Ana Laura Acosta; Camila Adoue; Maria Victoria Cantale; Pilar Cattaneo; Lara Aimeri; Lucia Arrascaeta; Lucia González; Morena Martinengo; Victoria Torres	Colombia; Maria Bedoya; Helena Londoño; Olivia Medina; Laura Patiño; Geraldine Castaño; María del Mar Quiroga; Salome Jiménez; Mariana Joyas; Luciana Lombana; Isabella Rengifo

== Medal table ==
=== Senior ===
Rank	Nation	Gold	Silver	Bronze	Total
1	Brazil (BRA)	9	2	2	13
2	Argentina (ARG)	1	6	3	10
3	Colombia (COL)	0	1	4	5
4	Chile (CHI)	0	1	1	2
Totals (4 entries)		10	10	10	30

=== Junior ===
Rank	Nation	Gold	Silver	Bronze	Total
1	Brazil (BRA)	10	4	1	15
2	Argentina (ARG)	0	3	3	6
3	Colombia (COL)	0	1	5	6
4	Venezuela (VEN)	0	1	1	2
5	Chile (CHI)	0	1	0	1
Totals (5 entries)		10	10	10	30

=== Combined ===
Rank	Nation	Gold	Silver	Bronze	Total
1	Brazil (BRA)	19	6	3	28
2	Argentina (ARG)	1	9	6	16
3	Colombia (COL)	0	2	9	11
4	Chile (CHI)	0	2	1	3
5	Venezuela (VEN)	0	1	1	2
Totals (5 entries)		20	20	20	60

== Participating nations ==
- Argentina
- Bolivia
- Brazil
- Chile
- Colombia
- Ecuador
- Peru
- Venezuela

== See also ==
- Gymnastics at the 2022 South American Games
