= Celeste D'Arcángelo =

Argentine rhythmic gymnast

Celeste D’Arcángelo
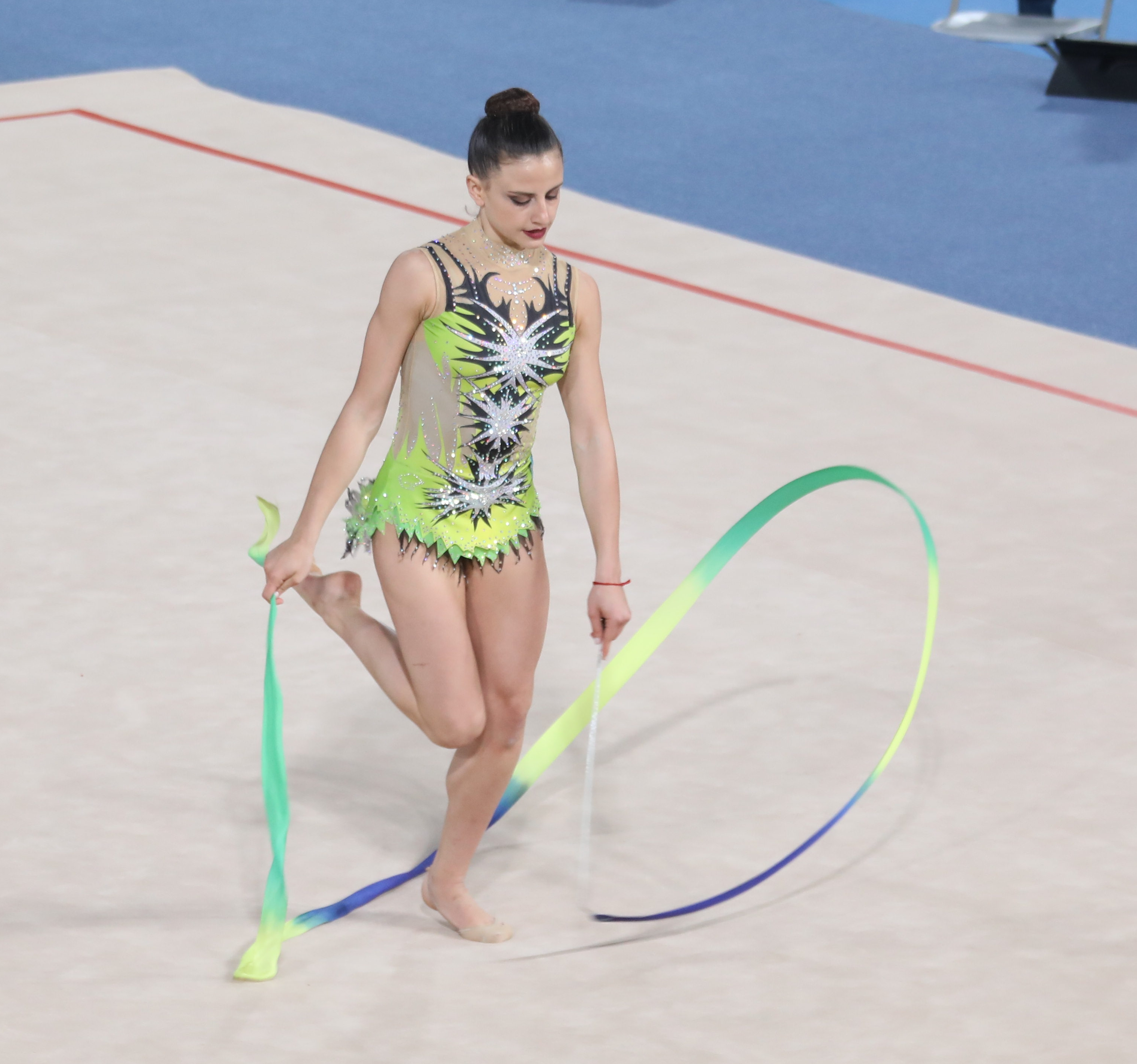

Personal information
- Full name: Celeste Abril D’Arcángelo
- Born: 7 July 2003 (age 23) Córdoba, Argentina
- Relatives: Hernán D'Arcangelo (brother)

Gymnastics career
- Discipline: Rhythmic gymnastics
- Country represented: Argentina; (2012-present)
- Club: Club Municipalidad
- Head coach: Vanina Lorefice
Medal record
Rhythmic gymnastics
Representing Argentina
South American Games
Bronze medal – third place	2022 Asunción	Ribbon
Bronze medal – third place	2026 Santa Fe	All-Around
Bronze medal – third place	2026 Santa Fe	Ball
Bronze medal – third place	2026 Santa Fe	Clubs
Bronze medal – third place	2026 Santa Fe	Ribbon
South American Championships
Gold medal – first place	2022 Paipa	Clubs
Gold medal – first place	2023 Barranquilla	Hoop
Gold medal – first place	2023 Barranquilla	Ball
Gold medal – first place	2024 Santiago	Hoop
Gold medal – first place	2024 Santiago	Ball
Gold medal – first place	2024 Santiago	Clubs
Gold medal – first place	2024 Santiago	Ribbons
Gold medal – first place	2025 Cochabamba	Team
Gold medal – first place	2025 Cochabamba	All-Around Team
Gold medal – first place	2026 Asunción	Hoop
Gold medal – first place	2026 Asunción	Ribbon
Silver medal – second place	2021 Cali	Team
Silver medal – second place	2021 Cali	All-around team
Silver medal – second place	2022 Paipa	Team
Silver medal – second place	2022 Paipa	All-around team
Silver medal – second place	2022 Paipa	Ball
Silver medal – second place	2022 Paipa	Ribbon
Silver medal – second place	2023 Barranquilla	All-Around
Silver medal – second place	2023 Barranquilla	Team
Silver medal – second place	2023 Barranquilla	All-around team
Silver medal – second place	2023 Barranquilla	Clubs
Silver medal – second place	2024 Santiago	Team
Silver medal – second place	2024 Santiago	All-Around
Silver medal – second place	2024 Santiago	All-Around Team
Silver medal – second place	2025 Cochabamba	All-Around
Silver medal – second place	2026 Asunción	All-Around
Silver medal – second place	2026 Asunción	Team
Silver medal – second place	2026 Asunción	Clubs
Silver medal – second place	2026 Asunción	All-Around Team
Bronze medal – third place	2022 Paipa	All-around

Celeste D’Arcángelo (born 7 July 2003) is an Argentine rhythmic gymnast known for being the first Argentinian in this discipline to qualify at the Olympic Games, in this case, the Youth of Buenos Aires 2018. She is also an eight-time national champion.

== Personal life ==
Celeste D'Arcángelo is the youngest of four brothers and sisters, one of them being Hernán D'Arcángelo, a medalist at the 2011 Pan American Games in squash. She took up gymnastics at age four in Córdoba after having tried many sports. Her sport ambitions are to compete at the Olympic Games and World Championships. After the end of her competitive career D’Arcángelo aspires to study accounting or law at university.

== Career ==
=== Junior ===
D'Arcangelo began training at Córdoba Athletic at the age of four, until that activity at the sports center was closed. After that, being interested in sports, she joined the Club Municipalidad de Córdoba, where she was able to train with Silvina Márquez, Sandra Ré, Anahí Sosa, Antonella Yacobelli, Laura Arribas and Vanina Lorefice (her current coach). At the age of 9, she participated in her first South American Championship in the pre-child category.

In 2017 she was selected for Pan American Championship in Daytona Beach, qualifying for the hoop final where she ended up 6th.

She participated in the 2018 Pan American Junior Championship, in Medellín, where she was 5th in the All Around, 5th in the team competition along with Candela Urso, Martina Hadrowa and Karema Jara, and went on to three apparatus finals. In addition, this tournament gave her the pass for the 2018 Youth Olympic Games, in Buenos Aires, where she became the first Argentine rhythmic gymnast to qualify for an Olympic Games.

At the 2018 Youth Olympic Games she placed 29th in the rankings and fourth in the mixed multidisciplinary team event, she was also the youngest of the Argentine delegation that participated in the multidisciplinary event.

=== Senior ===
D'Arcangelo debuted in the World Cup circuit in Pesaro in 2019 and she then competed at the Lima Pan American Games, where she placed 8th in the ball final and 14th in the All-Around. In 2021, she took part to the 2021 Pan American Rhythmic Gymnastics Championships, in Rio de Janeiro, where she finished 13th in the All-Around, she was also 7th in the clubs final, and 4th with the team, along with Sol Fainberg, Candela Urso and Martina Gil.

In 2022 she competed in the World Cups in Pamplona and Baku, finishing mid ranking and not qualifying for finals. She competed in the 2022 Pan American Gymnastics Championships in Rio de Janeiro, where she placed 13th overall, and fifth in the team with Martina Gil and Sol Martinez Fainberg. In October, she participated in the 2022 South American Games in Asuncion, Paraguay, where she was fifth in the individual overall final, eighth in the club final, and won the bronze medal in the ribbon final. In December she participated in the 2022 South American Rhythmic Gymnastics Championships in Paipa, Colombia where she won bronze in the all-around behind the two Brazilians Barbara Domingos and Geovanna Santos, and also won silver for teams and in the ball and ribbon final and gold in the club final.

In 2023, she started the season competing at World Challenge Cup in Portimão, where she finished on 32nd place in all-around. She made her World Championships debut at the 2023 World Championships in Valencia, Spain. She was 38th in all-around qualifications. In October, she competed at the 2023 South American Championships in Barranquilla, Colombia. She won silver medal in team competition alongside Martina Gil and Agostina Vargas Re. She also won gold medals in hoop and ball and silver medals in all-around and clubs.

In 2024, she ended on 9th place in all-around at Pan American Championships in Guatemala. She qualified to ball final, finishing on 8th place. in November, she represented Argentina at the 2024 South American Championships in Santiago, Chile. She won gold medals in all four apparatus finals and silver in all-around and team competition.

In 2026, she started the season competing at Sofia World Cup and took 72nd place in all-around. In June, she represented Argentina at the 2026 Pan American Championships in Rio de Janeiro, and took 4th place in the all-around. She took 5th place in team competition alongside Agostina Vargas Re and Lara Granero. She was 8th in hoop, 7th in ball and 4th in ribbon final. In July, she competed at the 2026 South American Championships in Asunción, Paraguay, alongside Agostina Vargas Re and Martina Espejo. They won silver medal in team competition. She took another silver in all-around behind Samara Sibin. In August, she represented Argentina at the 2026 World Championships in Frankfurt, Germany, placing 56th in the all-around.

== Routine music information ==
Year	Apparatus	Music Title
2026	Hoop	El Tango De Roxanne by José Feliciano, Ewan McGregor, Jacek Koman
2026	Ball	Pacto de Olivos by Sergei Grosny
2026	Clubs	Bad Blood by Rok Nardin
2026	Ribbon	Get the Party Started by Shirley Bassey
2025	Hoop	El Tango De Roxanne by José Feliciano, Ewan McGregor, Jacek Koman
2025	Ball	Garganta Con Arena by Cacho Castaña
2025	Clubs	
2025	Ribbon	Get the Party Started by Shirley Bassey
2024	Hoop	El Tango De Roxanne by José Feliciano, Ewan McGregor, Jacek Koman
2024	Ball	Garganta Con Arena by Cacho Castaña
2024	Clubs	
2024	Ribbon	Granada by Luciano Pavarotti
2023	Hoop	Heist by Dresz
2023	Ball	Garganta con arena by Cacho Castaña
2023	Clubs	Bring The Pain by Brand X Music
2023	Ribbon	Granada by Luciano Pavarotti
2022	Hoop	Heist by Dresz
2022	Ball	Garganta con arena by Cacho Castaña
2022	Clubs	Season Of The Witch by Audiomachine feat Molly
2022	Ribbon	Don't Stop Me Now by Queen
2021	Hoop	???
2021	Ball	El Choclo by Destiny Quartet
2021	Clubs	Season Of The Witch by Audiomachine feat Molly
2021	Ribbon	Don't Stop Me Now by Queen
2019	Hoop	???
2019	Ball	El Choclo by Destiny Quartet
2019	Clubs	Power Trip (Geometry Dash SubZero) by Boom Kitty
2019	Ribbon	Boat Chase / Chopper Chase & Face Off by John Powell
2018	Hoop	The Puss Suite by Henry Jackman
2018	Ball	El Choclo by Destiny Quartet
2018	Clubs	Bamboleo by Gipsy Kings
2018	Ribbon	Boat Chase / Chopper Chase & Face Off by John Powell
