= Giovacchini =

Giovacchini is an Italian surname. Notable people with the surname include:

- Marianne Giovacchini (born 2005), Brazilian rhythmic gymnast
- Petru Giovacchini (1910–1955), Corsican activist
