= Isadora Oliveira =

Brazilian rhythmic gymnast (born 2007)

- Full name: Isadora Carnielli de Oliveira
- Born: April 23, 2007 (age 19) Campo Mourão, Brazil

Gymnastics career
- Discipline: Rhythmic gymnastics
- Country represented: Brazil (2021-present)
- Club: Clube Agire
Medal record
Rhythmic gymnastics
Representing Brazil
Junior Pan American Games
| Silver medal – second place | 2021 Cali | Ribbon |
| Bronze medal – third place | 2021 Cali | Ball |
| Bronze medal – third place | 2021 Cali | Clubs |
Junior Pan American Championships
| Silver medal – second place | 2022 Rio de Janeiro | Team |
| Bronze medal – third place | 2022 Rio de Janeiro | Ribbon |
Junior South American Championships
| Gold medal – first place | 2021 Cali | Team |
| Gold medal – first place | 2021 Cali | All-around team |
| Gold medal – first place | 2021 Cali | Ball |
| Gold medal – first place | 2021 Cali | Clubs |
| Gold medal – first place | 2022 Paipa | Team |
| Silver medal – second place | 2021 Cali | All-Around |
| Silver medal – second place | 2021 Cali | Hoop |
| Silver medal – second place | 2021 Cali | Ribbon |
| Silver medal – second place | 2022 Paipa | All-Around |
| Silver medal – second place | 2022 Paipa | Hoop |
| Silver medal – second place | 2022 Paipa | Clubs |
| Bronze medal – third place | 2022 Paipa | Ribbon |

Isadora Carnielli de Oliveira (born 23 April 2007) is a Brazilian rhythmic gymnast. She is a double junior Pan American medalist.

== Career ==
In 2021, Isadora won gold with hoop, ball, clubs, ribbon and in teams, silver in the All-Around at the Brazilian Championships in São Caetano do Sul. In November Isadora won gold in teams (along Maria Eduarda Alexandre and Emanuelle Felberk), with ball and with clubs as well as silver in the All-Around, with hoop and ribbon at the South American Championships. Then she was selected for the Junior Pan American Games in Cali, she finished won bronze with ball and with clubs as well as silver with ribbon.

The following year she was part of the junior individual team, along Maria Eduarda Alexandre, Keila Santos and Emanuelle Felberk, that won silver at the 2022 Pan American Championships in Rio de Janeiro. In the same competition she finished 4th in the All-Around and won bronze win ribbon behind Rin Keys and Maria Eduarda Alexandre. In September she represented Paraná at the Youth Games along Alexandre and Stefhany Popoatzki. From November 28th to December 4th she won gold in teams, silver in the All-Around, with hoops and with clubs and bronze with ribbon at the South American Championships.

In 2023 she became a senior, in May she was the bronze medalist in the All-Around and with ribbon at the Paranense's championships. Later she competed at the Brazilian Championships where she was the bronze medalist with ball and clubs.
