= Renata Diniz (gymnast) =

Brazilian rhythmic gymnast

- Full name: Renata Brum Diniz
- Born: 30 May 2008 (age 18) Belo Horizonte

Gymnastics career
- Discipline: Rhythmic gymnastics
- Country represented: Brazil; (2022-)
- Club: Espaço Cultural GRM
Medal record
Rhythmic gymnastics
Representing Brazil
South American Games
Gold medal – first place	2026 Santa Fe	Group All-Around
Gold medal – first place	2026 Santa Fe	5 Balls
Gold medal – first place	2026 Santa Fe	3 Hoops + 4 Clubs
South American Cup
Gold medal – first place	2024 Santiago	Team
Gold medal – first place	2025 Cochabamba	Team
Gold medal – first place	2025 Cochabamba	All-Around
Gold medal – first place	2025 Cochabamba	Ball
Gold medal – first place	2025 Cochabamba	All-Around Team
Silver medal – second place	2024 Santiago	Hoop
Silver medal – second place	2025 Cochabamba	Hoop
Silver medal – second place	2025 Cochabamba	Clubs
Silver medal – second place	2025 Cochabamba	Ribbon
South American Championships
Gold medal – first place	2022 Paipa	Age Group Team
Gold medal – first place	2022 Paipa	Age Group All-Around
Gold medal – first place	2022 Paipa	Age Group Hoop
Silver medal – second place	2022 Paipa	Age Group Ball
Silver medal – second place	2022 Paipa	Age Group Ribbonl

Renata Brum Diniz (born 30 May 2008) is a Brazilian rhythmic gymnast. She represents Brazil in international competitions.

== Career ==
In August 2021 Diniz participated in the Brazilian Championships, where she took bronze in the 2nd level category.

=== Junior ===
In July 2022 she was 7th in the 1st level category at nationals. She made her international debut in early December 2022, her first year as a junior, when she was selected for the South American Championships in Paipa. In Colombia, age group category (13 years old), she won gold in the All-Around, with hoop and in team along Julia Bessa and Fernanda Alvaz, as well as silver with ball and ribbon.

=== Senior ===
In 2024 she became age eligible for senior competitions and, in June, she won bronze in the All-Around, bronze with ribbon and silver with ball and clubs in the 1st level category at nationals. In November she was called up for the South American Championships in Santiago winning bronze with clubs, silver with hoop and gold in teams (along Marianne Giovacchini and Geane Silva) in the Cup part of the competition.

At the 2025 Brazilian Championships she was 5th overall. In September she won silver with hoop, with clubs and with ribbon, gold in the All-Around, with ball and in teams (with Fernanda Alvaz and Stefhany Popoatzki) in the Cup part of the South American Championships in Cochabamba.
