= Emanuelle Felberk =

Brazilian rhythmic gymnast (born 2007)

- Born: October 19, 2007 (age 18) Vitória, Espírito Santo, Brazil

Gymnastics career
- Discipline: Rhythmic gymnastics
- Country represented: Brazil; (2018-present)
- Club: Escola de Campeãs
- Head coach: Monika Mello Queiroz
Medal record
Rhythmic gymnastics
Representing Brazil
South American Championships
Gold medal – first place	2023 Barranquilla	Team (Senior A)
Gold medal – first place	2023 Barranquilla	Ribbon (Senior A)
Silver medal – second place	2023 Barranquilla	All-Around (Senior A)
Silver medal – second place	2025 Cochabamba	Team
Silver medal – second place	2025 Cochabamba	All-Around Team
Bronze medal – third place	2023 Barranquilla	Hoop (Senior A)
Junior Pan American Championships
Silver medal – second place	2022 Rio de Janeiro	Team
Junior South American Championships
Gold medal – first place	2021 Cali	Team
Gold medal – first place	2021 Cali	All-around team
Silver medal – second place	2021 Cali	Ball

Emanuelle Felberk (born 19 October 2007) is a Brazilian rhythmic gymnast. She represents Brazil in international competitions.

== Career ==
In 2017, aged 10, Emanuelle was called up for the Pan American Club Championships in Rosario. The following year she was the national champion in the children category, also winning in free-hands and clubs, getting silver with ball and bronze with rope. In October she competed in the South American Championships in the pre-junior category, winning gold in teams, silver in the All-Around and bronze with hoop.

=== Junior ===
In 2021, as a junior, she got bronze in the All-Around and with clubs, silver with ribbon at the Brazilian Championships. In November Emanuelle won gold in teams, along Maria Eduarda Alexandre and Isadora Oliveira, and silver with ball at the South American Championships. At the 2022 Junior Pan American Championships in Rio de Janeiro, Brazil, she won silvers in teams and was 7th with hoop.

=== Senior ===
Felberk became age eligible for senior competitions in 2023. After training in the United States for a bit, in early April Felberk took part in the Harlem Invitational and won gold in the All-Around, with hoop, ball, and clubs as well as silver with ribbon. In October she competed in the Senior A category of the South American Championships in Barranquilla, winning gold in teams (with Júlia Castro and Samara Sibin) and with ribbon, silver in the All-Around and bronze with hoop.

In September 2025 she was selected for the South American Championships in Cochabamba, winning silver in teams (with Ana Luísa Neiva and Samara Sibin) and in all-around teams.
