= Lucía González =

Lucía González may refer to:

- Lucía González Blanco (born 1990), Spanish cyclo-cross and road racing cyclist
- Lucía González (gymnast, born 2006), Spanish rhythmic gymnast
- Lucia González (gymnast, born 2007), Argentine rhythmic gymnast
