= Martina Gil =

Argentine rhythmic gymnast

- Born: 3 November 2003 (age 22) Haedo, Argentina

Gymnastics career
- Discipline: Rhythmic gymnastics
- Country represented: Argentina (2021-present)
Medal record
Rhythmic gymnastics
Representing Argentina
South American Championships
Gold medal – first place	2025 Cochabamba	Team
Gold medal – first place	2025 Cochabamba	All-Around Team
Silver medal – second place	2022 Paipa	Team
Silver medal – second place	2022 Paipa	All-around team
Silver medal – second place	2023 Barranquilla	Team
Silver medal – second place	2023 Barranquilla	All-around team
Silver medal – second place	2024 Santiago	Team
Silver medal – second place	2024 Santiago	All-Around Team
Silver medal – second place	2024 Santiago	Ribbon
Bronze medal – third place	2022 Paipa	Ball

Martina Gil (born 3 November 2003) is an Argentinian rhythmic gymnast. She represents her country in international competitions.

== Career ==
In June 2021 Martina competed with two apparatuses in the Pan American Championships in Rio de Janeiro, she took 17th place with both hoop and ball and 4th in the team competition.

In June 2022 she competed in the Pan American Championships, being 5th in teams and 15th in the All-Around. In October she was selected for the South American Games in Assuncion, she was 18th in the All-Around and 8th in both the hoop and ball finals. In late November she won silver in teams, with Celeste D'Arcángelo, Lara Granero and Agostina Vargas Re, and bronze with ball at the South American Championships in Paipa.

In 2023 she participated in the World Cup in Portimão, where she took 49th place overall. In June she took part in the Pan American Championships in Guadalajara, she was 6th in teams, 14th with hoop and 20th with ribbon. A month later she tool 18th place in the All-Around at the 2021 Summer World University Games in Chengdu. In October she won silver in the team competition along Celeste D'Arcángelo and Agostina Vargas Re, at the South American Championships in Barranquilla.

In June 2024 Gil participated in the Pan American Championships in Ciudad de Guatemala, finishing 5th in teams and 17th in the All-Around.

In September 2025 she was selected for the South American Championships in Cochabamba, winning gold in teams (with Celeste D'Arcángelo and Agostina Vargas Re) and in all-around teams.
