= Marianne Giovacchini =

Brazilian rhythmic gymnast

- Full name: Marianne Giovacchini dos Santos
- Born: 2005 (age 20–21) São Paulo, Brazil

Gymnastics career
- Discipline: Rhythmic gymnastics
- Country represented: Brazil (2024-present)
- Club: Clube Espéria
- Head coach: Camila Ferezin
- Choreographer: Bruna Martins
Medal record
Representing Brazil
Rhythmic Gymnastics
Pan American Gymnastics Championships
Gold medal – first place	2025 Asunción	Group All-Around
Gold medal – first place	2025 Asunción	5 Ribbons
Gold medal – first place	2025 Asunción	3 Balls & 2 Hoops
South American Championships
Gold medal – first place	2026 Asunción	Group All-Around
Gold medal – first place	2026 Asunción	5 Balls
Gold medal – first place	2026 Asunción	3 Hoops + 4 Clubs
Gold medal – first place	2026 Asunción	All-Around Team
South American Cup
Gold medal – first place	2024 Santiago	Team
Bronze medal – third place	2024 Santiago	All-Around

Marianne Giovacchini dos Santos (born 2005) is a Brazilian rhythmic gymnast. She represents Brazil in international competitions as part of the national group.

== Career ==
Giovacchini competed in the 2023 Brazilian Championships, winning bronze in the All-Around as well as silver with ball and with clubs in the 1st level category. In November of that same year she won silver in the trio completion at the national group championships.

In 2024, she took 7th place overall at the Brazilian Championships. In November she participated in the South American Championships in Santiago, winning bronze in the All-Around and gold in teams (along Renata Diniz and Geane Silva) in the Cup part of the competition. Following these results, in early December she was selected for a selection for the national group. A week later it was revealed she was selected to integrate the group.

In May 2025 it was revealed she was selected for the 2025 Pan American Championships in Asunción, alongside Julia Kurunczi, Lavinia Silvério, Maria Fernanda Moraes, Keila Santos and Rhayane Vitoria Ferreira Brum. There she won gold in the All-Around, with 5 ribbons and with 3 balls & 2 hoops. In late December she was confirmed into the group.

In 2026, she was a part of national reserve group. In June, Marianne and her teammates (Bárbara Galvão, Maria Moraes, Rhayane Ferreira, Victória Borges, Andriely Cichovicz) competed at the 2026 South American Championships in Asunción, Paraguay. They won gold medal in all-around competition.
