= Lara Aimeri =

Argentine rhythmic gymnast

- Full name: Lara Agostina Aimeri Vicentin
- Born: 8 January 2007 (age 19) Córdoba, Argentina

Gymnastics career
- Discipline: Rhythmic gymnastics
- Country represented: Argentina (2022-present)
Medal record
Rhythmic gymnastics
Representing Argentina
South American Championships
| Silver medal – second place | 2022 Paipa | Group All-Around |
| Silver medal – second place | 2022 Paipa | 5 Balls |
| Silver medal – second place | 2026 Asunción | All-Around Team |
| Bronze medal – third place | 2022 Paipa | 5 Ropes |
| Bronze medal – third place | 2026 Asunción | Group All-Around |
| Bronze medal – third place | 2026 Asunción | 5 Balls |
| Bronze medal – third place | 2026 Asunción | 3 Hoops + 4 Clubs |
Pan American Championships
| Bronze medal – third place | 2024 Ciudad de Guatemala | 3 Ribbons + 2 Balls |

Lara Agostina Aimeri Vicentin (born 8 January 2007) is an Argentine rhythmic gymnast. She represents her country in international competitions.

== Career ==
Lara was part of junior group, along Lucia Arrascaeta, Lucia González, Morena Martinengo and Victoria Torres, that won silver in the All-Around and with 5 balls as well as bronze with 5 ropes at the 2022 South American Championships.

She became a senior the following year, competing at the 2023 Pan American Championships in Guadalajara as a member of the national group along Pilar Cattaneo, Maria Cantale, Ana Acosta, Lucia Arrascaeta, and Lucia González. They took 9th place in the All-Around, 8th with 5 hoops and 10 with 3 ribbons & 2 balls.

In 2024 she won an historical bronze medal in the 3 ribbons & 2 balls at the Pan American Championships in Ciudad de Guatemala along Lucia Arrascaeta, Pilar Cattaneo, Lucia González and Gabriela Vega.
