= 2024 South American Rhythmic Gymnastics Championships =

Rhythmic Gymnastics competition

- Location: Santiago, Chile
- Start date: 04 November 2024
- End date: 10 November 2024

The 2024 South American Rhythmic Gymnastics Championships were held in Santiago, Chile, from November 4 to 10, 2024. The competition is organized by the Chilean Gymnastics Federation and approved by the International Gymnastics Federation. A parallel event, the South American Cup, was held alongside the South American Championships.

== Medalists ==
=== South American Championships ===
==== Age group ====
Event	Gold	Silver	Bronze
Team	Brazil; Amanda Manente; Mariana Sartori	Argentina; Clara Marzo; Martina Tolosa	Colombia; Dhanna Castro; Sara Suaterna
Hoop	Mariana Sartori (BRA)	Martina Tolosa (ARG)	Sara Suaterna (COL)
Ball	Amanda Manente (BRA)	Clara Marzo (ARG)	Dhanna Castro (COL)
Clubs	Amanda Manente (BRA)	Martina Tolosa (ARG)	Dhanna Castro (COL)
Ribbon	Clara Marzo (ARG)	Aranza Conde (VEN)	Mariana Sartori (BRA)

==== Senior ====
Event	Gold	Silver	Bronze
Team all-around	Brazil; Ana Luísa Neiva; Samara Sibin; Keila Santos	Argentina; Celeste D'Arcángelo; Martina Gil; Agostina Vargas Re	Chile; Martina Ferrari; Trinidad González; Emilia Soto; Trinidad Urrutia
Individual all-around	Ana Luísa Neiva (BRA)	Celeste D'Arcángelo (ARG)	Samara Sibin (BRA)
Hoop	Celeste D'Arcángelo (ARG)	Ana Luísa Neiva (BRA)	Oriana Viñas (COL)
Ball	Celeste D'Arcángelo (ARG)	Oriana Viñas (COL)	Samara Sibin (BRA)
Clubs	Celeste D'Arcángelo (ARG)	Ana Luísa Neiva (BRA)	Samara Sibin (BRA)
Ribbon	Celeste D'Arcángelo (ARG)	Martina Gil (ARG)	Samara Sibin (BRA)
Group all-around	Brazil	Chile	Argentina
Group 5 hoops	Brazil	Chile	Argentina
Group 3 ribbons + 2 balls	Brazil	Chile	Argentina
Duo + Trio	Brazil	Chile	Colombia
Duo	Brazil	Colombia	Venezuela
Trio	Colombia	Brazil	Chile
All-around team	Brazil	Argentina	Chile

=== South American Cup ===
==== Age group ====
Event	Gold	Silver	Bronze
Team	Argentina; Catalina Neri; Martina Peralta	Brazil; Anarue Lima; Helena Ratis	Venezuela; Ema Lopez; Susana Valbuena
Hoop	Catalina Neri (ARG)	Ema Lopez (VEN)	Anarue Lima (BRA)
Ball	Catalina Neri (ARG)	Helena Ratis (BRA)	Ema Lopez (VEN)
Clubs	Susana Valbuena (VEN)	Agustina Claveria (CHI)	Anarue Lima (BRA)
Ribbon	Helena Ratis (BRA)	Agustina Claveria (CHI)	Susana Valbuena (VEN)

==== Senior ====
Event	Gold	Silver	Bronze
Team	Brazil; Renata Diniz; Geane Silva; Marianne Giovacchini	Argentina; Martina Espejo; Lara Granero; Karema Jara; Mia Pomato	Chile; Josefa Cornejo; Sofía Delgado; Maite Urrutia; Anastacia Venegas
Individual All-Around	Geane Silva (BRA)	Lara Granero (ARG)	Marianne Giovacchini (BRA)
Hoop	Geane Silva (BRA)	Renata Diniz (BRA)	Fernanda Heinemann (PAR)
Ball	Lara Granero (ARG)	Geane Silva (BRA)	Fernanda Heinemann (PAR)
Clubs	Lara Granero (ARG)	Geane Silva (BRA)	Renata Diniz (BRA)
Ribbon	Geane Silva (BRA)	Mia Pomato (ARG)	Lara Granero (ARG)
Group all-around	Brazil	Argentina	Chile
Group 5 hoops	Argentina	Chile	Brazil
Group 3 ribbons + 2 balls	Brazil	Argentina	Chile
Duo + Trio	Brazil	Venezuela	Chile
Duo	Brazil	Chile	Venezuela
Trio	Brazil	Venezuela	Chile
All-around team	Brazil	Argentina	Chile

== Medal table ==
Rank	Nation	Gold	Silver	Bronze	Total
1	Brazil (BRA)	23	8	10	41
2	Argentina (ARG)	11	14	4	29
3	Venezuela (VEN)	1	4	5	10
4	Colombia (COL)	1	2	6	9
5	Chile (CHI)	0	8	9	17
6	Paraguay (PAR)	0	0	2	2
Totals (6 entries)		36	36	36	108

== Participating nations ==
- Argentina
- Bolivia
- Brazil
- Chile
- Colombia
- Ecuador
- Paraguay
- Peru
- Venezuela

== See also ==
- 2024 Pan American Rhythmic Gymnastics Championships
- 2024 Junior South American Rhythmic Gymnastics Championships
