= Agostina Vargas Re =

Argentine rhythmic gymnast

- Born: 18 August 2006 (age 20) Cordoba, Argentina

Gymnastics career
- Discipline: Rhythmic gymnastics
- Country represented: Argentina; (2021-present)
Medal record
Rhythmic gymnastics
Representing Argentina
South American Games
| Bronze medal – third place | 2026 Santa Fe | Hoop |
South American Championships
| Gold medal – first place | 2025 Cochabamba | Team |
| Gold medal – first place | 2025 Cochabamba | All-Around Team |
| Gold medal – first place | 2025 Cochabamba | Hoop |
| Silver medal – second place | 2022 Paipa | Team |
| Silver medal – second place | 2022 Paipa | All-around team |
| Silver medal – second place | 2023 Barranquilla | Team |
| Silver medal – second place | 2023 Barranquilla | All-around team |
| Silver medal – second place | 2024 Santiago | Team |
| Silver medal – second place | 2024 Santiago | All-Around Team |
| Silver medal – second place | 2026 Asunción | Team |
| Silver medal – second place | 2026 Asunción | All-Around Team |
| Bronze medal – third place | 2025 Cochabamba | All-Around |
| Bronze medal – third place | 2026 Asunción | All-Around |
| Bronze medal – third place | 2026 Asunción | Hoop |
| Bronze medal – third place | 2026 Asunción | Ribbon |
Junior Pan American Championships
| Bronze medal – third place | 2021 Guatemala City | Team |
Junior South American Championships
| Silver medal – second place | 2021 Cali | Team |
| Silver medal – second place | 2021 Cali | All-around team |

Agostina Vargas Re (born 18 August 2006) is an Argentinian rhythmic gymnast. She represents her country in international competitions.

== Career ==
=== 2021 ===
In November 2021, as a junior, Agostina won silver in teams (along Lara Granero and Eugenia Angelin) as well as bronze with clubs at the South American Championships. In December, she competed at the 2021 Junior Pan American Games in Cali, Colombia, taking 13th place in the All-Around and 7th in the clubs final. For that achievement she received an Incentive Award.

=== 2022 ===
She became a senior in 2022 In late November she won silver in teams, with Celeste D'Arcángelo, Lara Granero and Martina Gil, at the South American Championships in Paipa.

=== 2023 ===
In June she took part in the Pan American Championships in Guadalajara, she was 6th in teams, 11th with both ball and clubs, the only apparatuses she competed with. In October she won silver in the team competition along Celeste D'Arcángelo and Martina Gil, at the South American Championships in Barranquilla.

=== 2024 ===
In June Gil participated in the Pan American Championships in Ciudad de Guatemala, finishing 5th in the team ranking, 8th with hoop and 6th with ribbon.

=== 2025 ===
In August she was selected to participate to the World Championships in Rio de Janeiro, where she finished 72nd in the all-around and had her best placement with ribbon (63rd).

In September she was selected for the South American Championships in Cochabamba, winning gold in teams (with Celeste D'Arcángelo and Martina Gil), with hoop and in all-around teams, as well as bronze in the All-Around.

=== 2026 ===
In March, she competed at the Sofia World Cup, finishing 61st in the all-around and with her best apparatus being ribbon (43rd).

In June, she participated to the Pan American Championships in Rio de Janeiro, competing with only hoop and ribbon and finishing 13th and 10th respectively. She also placed 5th in the team ranking with teammates Lara Granero and Celeste D'Arcangelo.

In July, she participated to the South American Championships in Asunción, winning bronze medals in the all-around, with hoop and ribbon, and placing 4th with ball and clubs; additionally, she won silver medal in the team ranking, together with teammates Celeste D'Arcangelo, Lara Granero, Martina Espejo and the group.

== Routine music information ==
| Year | Apparatus | Music title |
|---|---|---|
| 2026 | Hoop | Misfortune by Brand X Music |
| 2026 | Ball | In Odd We Trust by Jasha Alain Klebe |
| 2026 | Clubs | Vogue by Madonna |
| 2026 | Ribbon | Voulez-Vous by the cast of Mamma Mia! the Movie |
| 2025 | Hoop | Misfortune by Brand X Music |
| 2025 | Ball | Caruso by Benedetta Caretta |
| 2025 | Clubs | Vogue by Madonna |
| 2025 | Ribbon | Voulez-Vous by the cast of Mamma Mia! the Movie |
| 2024 | Hoop | Tokyo Drift by Teriyaki Boyz |
| 2024 | Ball | Там нет меня by Sevara Nazarkhan |
| 2024 | Clubs | Gayatri Mantra by Deva Premal / Sind' by Faraualla |
| 2024 | Ribbon | Voulez-Vous by the cast of Mamma Mia! the Movie |
