= Vanessa Galindo =

Colombian rhythmic gymnast (born 2002)

- Full name: Vanessa Galindo Saavedra
- Born: 17 March 2002 (age 24) Bogotá, Colombia

Gymnastics career
- Discipline: Rhythmic gymnastics
- Country represented: Colombia; (2017–)
- Head coach: Marta Pardo / Mariangel Balza
Medal record
Rhythmic gymnastics
Representing Colombia
Event	1st	2nd	3rd
Pacific Rim Championships	0	0	1
CAC Games	0	1	0
South American Championships	0	1	8
Bolivarian Games	2	2	1
Total	2	4	10
Pacific Rim Championships
Bronze medal – third place	2024 Cali	Team
Central American and Caribbean Games
Silver medal – second place	2023 San Salvador	Team
South American Championships
Silver medal – second place	2018 Melgar	Team
Bronze medal – third place	2018 Melgar	Hoop
Bronze medal – third place	2019 Bogotá	Hoop
Bronze medal – third place	2021 Cali	Team
Bronze medal – third place	2021 Cali	All-around team
Bronze medal – third place	2022 Paipa	Team
Bronze medal – third place	2022 Paipa	All-around team
Bronze medal – third place	2023 Barranquilla	Team
Bronze medal – third place	2023 Barranquilla	All-around team
Bolivarian Games
Gold medal – first place	2022 Valledupar	Ball
Gold medal – first place	2022 Valledupar	Clubs
Silver medal – second place	2022 Valledupar	All-around
Silver medal – second place	2022 Valledupar	Hoop
Bronze medal – third place	2022 Valledupar	Ribbon

Vanessa Galindo (born 17 March 2002) is a Colombian rhythmic gymnast. She's a multiple South American Championships medalist.

== Career ==
Vanessa debuted at the 2017 Pan American Championships in Daytona Beach where she ended 7th in teams and 14th in the All-Around.

In 2018, at the World Cup in Portimão she was 24th in the All-Around, 26th with hoop,19th with ball, 24th with clubs and 23rd with ribbon. In the summer she took part in the Central American and Caribbean Games. In September, she was selected for the 2018 Pan American Championship; she was 5th in teams and 17th in the All-Around. In October, she won silver in teams and bronze with hoop at the South American Championships.

She competed at the 2019 World Cup in Guadalajara, finishing 33rd in the All-Around, 31st with hoop, 27th with ball, 35th with clubs and 35th with ribbon. Then she took part in the South American Championships where she won bronze in the hoop final. She was selected for her maiden World Championships, finishing 34th in teams, 80th in the All-Around, 75th with hoop, 101st with ball, 79th with ribbon.

After the 2020 season was cut short because of the COVID-19 pandemic, she returned to competition at the 2021 World Cup in Minsk, ending 19th in the All-Around, 19th with hoop, 18th with ball, 18th with clubs and 18th with ribbon. In June she competed at the Pan American Championships being 5th in teams, 14th in the All-Around, 12th with hoop, 15th with ball, 16th with clubs and 7th with ribbon. Then at the 2021 South American Championships she won bronze in teams along Lina Dussan, Nathalia Hurtado and Oriana Viñas.

In 2022 she performed at the World Cup in Portimão ending 23rd in the All-Around, 22nd with hoop, 24th with ball, 27th with clubs and 27th with ribbon. At the Bolivarian Games in Valledupar she won gold with ball and clubs, silver in the All-Around, with hoop and bronze with ribbon. During the South American Championships she, again won bronze in teams with Nathalia Hurtado and Oriana Viñas.

In 2023 she won team silver at the Central American and Caribbean Games. In October she competed at the South American Championships where she won bronze in teams alongside Lina Dussan and Oriana Viñas.
