= 2026 South American Rhythmic Gymnastics Championships =

Rhythmic Gymnastics competition

- Location: Asunción, Paraguay
- Start date: 02 July 2026
- End date: 05 July 2026

The 2026 South American Rhythmic Gymnastics Championships are going to be held in Asunción, Paraguay from July 2 to 5, 2026. The competition is organised by the Paraguayan Gymnastics Federation and approved by World Gymnastics. A parallel event, the South American Cup, was held alongside the South American Championships.

== Participating nations ==
- Argentina
- Bolivia
- Brazil
- Chile
- Colombia
- Ecuador
- Paraguay
- Peru
- Uruguay
- Venezuela*

*On July 2nd it was revealed that the Venezuelan team withdrawed from the competition following the earthquakes that hit the country.

== Medalists ==
=== South American Championships ===
==== Senior ====
Event	Gold	Silver	Bronze
Team all-around	Brazil; Sarah Mourão; Ana Luísa Neiva; Samara Sibin	Argentina; Celeste D'Arcángelo; Martina Espejo; Lara Granero; Agostina Vargas Re	Colombia; Natalia Dreszer; Helena Londoño; Emiliana Vargas
Individual all-around	Samara Sibin (BRA)	Celeste D'Arcángelo (ARG)	Agostina Vargas Re (ARG)
Hoop	Celeste D'Arcángelo (ARG)	Samara Sibin (BRA)	Agostina Vargas Re (ARG)
Ball	Samara Sibin (BRA)	Lara Granero (ARG)	Emiliana Vargas (COL)
Clubs	Sarah Mourão (BRA)	Celeste D'Arcángelo (ARG)	Samara Sibin (BRA)
Ribbon	Celeste D'Arcángelo (ARG)	Samara Sibin (BRA)	Agostina Vargas Re (ARG)
Group all-around	Brazil; Andriely Cichovicz; Victoria Borges; Rhayane Ferreira; Marianne Giovacchini; Maria Moraes; Barbara Urquiza	Chile; Antonia Gallegos; Annalena Galleguillos; Isabel Lozano; Martina Inostroza; Josefina Romero	Argentina; Lara Aimeri; Pilar Cattaneo; Milena López; Franca Miravet; Camila Schaffer
Group 5 Balls	Brazil; Andriely Cichovicz; Victoria Borges; Rhayane Ferreira; Marianne Giovacchini; Maria Moraes; Barbara Urquiza	Chile; Antonia Gallegos; Annalena Galleguillos; Isabel Lozano; Martina Inostroza; Josefina Romero	Argentina; Lara Aimeri; Pilar Cattaneo; Milena López; Franca Miravet; Camila Schaffer
Group 3 Hoops + 4 Clubs	Brazil; Andriely Cichovicz; Victoria Borges; Rhayane Ferreira; Marianne Giovacchini; Maria Moraes; Barbara Urquiza	Chile; Antonia Gallegos; Annalena Galleguillos; Isabel Lozano; Martina Inostroza; Josefina Romero	Argentina; Lara Aimeri; Pilar Cattaneo; Milena López; Franca Miravet; Camila Schaffer
Trio	Brazil; Maryah Oni; Giulia Portela; Isa Borba	Chile; Amaral Andrade; Josefa González; Paula Hernández	—N/a
All-around team	Brazil; Sarah Mourão; Ana Luísa Neiva; Samara Sibin; Andriely Cichovicz; Victoria Borges; Rhayane Ferreira; Marianne Giovacchini; Maria Moraes; Barbara Urquiza	Argentina; Celeste D'Arcángelo; Martina Espejo; Lara Granero; Agostina Vargas Re; Lara Aimeri; Pilar Cattaneo; Milena López; Franca Miravet; Camila Schaffer	Chile; Josefa Cornejo; Trinidad González; Constanza Ortiz; Emilia Soto; Annalena Galleguillos; Antonia Gallegos; Isabel Lozano; Josefina Romero; Martina Inostroza

=== South American Cup ===
==== Age group ====
Event	Gold	Silver	Bronze
Team	Brazil; Anny Lima; Sophia Rocha; Maria Vitória Silva	Chile; Violeta Galleguillos; Antonella Leal	Paraguay; Milagros Sánchez; María Paz Rolón
Hoop	Sophia Rocha (BRA)	Milena Bazila (ARG)	Violeta Galleguillos (CHI)
Ball	Anny Lima (BRA)	Antonella Leal (CHI)	Milagros Sánchez (PAR)
Clubs	Sophia Rocha (BRA)	Antonella Leal (CHI)	Milena Bazila (ARG)
Ribbon	Maria Vitória Silva (BRA)	Antonella Leal (CHI)	Milagros Sánchez (PAR)

==== Senior ====
Event	Gold	Silver	Bronze
Team all-around	Brazil; Fernanda Alvaz; Maria Flávia Britto; Natalie Gittelson	Colombia; Luna Henao; Mariadelmar Quiroga; Salome Ricaurte	Chile; Belen Diaz; Dominga Badilla; Matilde Trivique; Montserrat Urrutia
Individual all-around	Fernanda Alvaz (BRA)	Maria Flávia Britto (BRA)	Ana Carolina de Conto (PAR)
Hoop	Fernanda Alvaz (BRA)	Maria Flávia Britto (BRA)	Ana Carolina de Conto (PAR)
Ball	Natalie Gittelson (BRA)	Ana Carolina de Conto (PAR)	Belen Diaz (CHI)
Clubs	Natalie Gittelson (BRA)	Fernanda Alvaz (BRA)	Ana Carolina de Conto (PAR)
Ribbon	Fernanda Alvaz (BRA)	Maria Flávia Britto (BRA)	Ana Carolina de Conto (PAR)
Group all-around	Brazil; Alice Costa; Roberta Goudel; Amanda Mafacioli; Marcela Pinheiro; Emilly Santos; Larissa Santos	Paraguay; Camila Arrúa; Kamila Chávez; Luna Coronel; Susana Domínguez; Melany Núñez; Luján Salas	Bolivia; Ariane Chacón; Emma Jiménez; Andere Knez; Inés Pereyra; Zhara Rocabado; María Saldías
Group 5 Balls	Brazil; Alice Costa; Roberta Goudel; Amanda Mafacioli; Marcela Pinheiro; Emilly Santos; Larissa Santos	Paraguay; Camila Arrúa; Kamila Chávez; Luna Coronel; Susana Domínguez; Melany Núñez; Luján Salas	Argentina; Julieta Battaglia; Triana Degli Esposti; Malena Gómez; Selena Lafuente; Guadalupe Salvo; Milagros Vannelli
Group 3 Hoops + 4 Clubs	Brazil; Alice Costa; Roberta Goudel; Amanda Mafacioli; Marcela Pinheiro; Emilly Santos; Larissa Santos	Paraguay; Camila Arrúa; Kamila Chávez; Luna Coronel; Susana Domínguez; Melany Núñez; Luján Salas	Chile; Francisca Benitez; Valentina Bravo; Pascal Infante; Sofia Muñoz; Emily Zúñiga
Trio	Brazil; Agatha Monteiro; Luiza Traspadini; Sophia Loubac	Chile; Florencia Rebolledo; Rocío Rebolledo; Fernanda Ramírez	Argentina; Ana Orazzi; Emiliana Bárcena; Francesca Tavella
All-around team	Brazil; Fernanda Alvaz; Maria Flávia Britto; Natalie Gittelson; Alice Costa; Roberta Goudel; Amanda Mafacioli; Marcela Pinheiro; Emilly Santos; Larissa Santos	Chile; Belen Diaz; Dominga Badilla; Matilde Trivique; Montserrat Urrutia; Francisca Benitez; Valentina Bravo; Pascal Infante; Sofia Muñoz; Emily Zúñiga	Argentina; Emma Ceballos; Paloma López; Olivia Páez; Maia Valeiras; Julieta Battaglia; Triana Degli Esposti; Malena Gómez; Selena Lafuente; Guadalupe Salvo; Milagros Vannelli

== Medal table ==
* Host nation (Paraguay)

Rank	Nation	Gold	Silver	Bronze	Total
1	Brazil	25	6	1	32
2	Argentina	2	6	10	18
3	Chile	0	10	5	15
4	Paraguay*	0	4	7	11
5	Colombia	0	1	2	3
6	Bolivia	0	0	1	1
Totals (6 entries)		27	27	26	80

== See also ==
- 2026 Pan American Rhythmic Gymnastics Championships
- 2026 Junior South American Rhythmic Gymnastics Championships
