= 2023 South American Rhythmic Gymnastics Championships =

Rhythmic Gymnastics competition

- Location: Barranquilla, Colombia
- Start date: 13 October 2023
- End date: 15 October 2023

The 2023 South American Rhythmic Gymnastics Championships were held in Barranquilla, Colombia, from October 13 to 15, 2023. The competition was organized by the Colombian Gymnastics Federation and approved by the International Gymnastics Federation. For the first time, the event has two different categories: Elite, and A. Both categories are open to senior gymnasts regardless of previous international results.

== Medalists ==
=== Senior Elite ===
Event	Gold	Silver	Bronze
Team all-around	Brazil; Maria Eduarda Alexandre; Ana Luísa Neiva; Thainá Ramos	Argentina; Celeste D'Arcángelo; Martina Gil; Agostina Vargas Re	Colombia; Lina Dussan; Vanessa Galindo; Oriana Viñas
Individual all-around	Maria Eduarda Alexandre (BRA)	Celeste D'Arcángelo (ARG)	Ana Luísa Neiva (BRA)
Hoop	Celeste D'Arcángelo (ARG)	Ana Luísa Neiva (BRA)	Lina Dussan (COL)
Ball	Celeste D'Arcángelo (ARG)	Lina Dussan (COL)	Ana Luísa Neiva (BRA)
Clubs	Maria Eduarda Alexandre (BRA)	Celeste D'Arcángelo (ARG)	Lina Dussan (COL)
Ribbon	Maria Eduarda Alexandre (BRA)	Lina Dussan (COL)	Ana Luísa Neiva (BRA)
Group all-around	Brazil; Victória Borges; Julia Kurunczi; Mariana Vitória Gonçalves; Gabriella Coradine; Maria Flávia Britto; Maria Fernanda Moraes	Chile; Martina Espejo; Antonia Gallegos; Annalena Ley; Isabel Lozano; Josefina Romero; Anneli Sepúlveda	Argentina; Milagros Centeno; Evangelina Cordier; Karema Jara; Agustina Luján; Ludmila Miravet; Macarena Rodríguez
Group 5 hoops	Brazil; Victória Borges; Julia Kurunczi; Mariana Vitória Gonçalves; Gabriella Coradine; Maria Flávia Britto; Maria Fernanda Moraes	Chile; Martina Espejo; Antonia Gallegos; Annalena Ley; Isabel Lozano; Josefina Romero; Anneli Sepúlveda	Argentina; Milagros Centeno; Evangelina Cordier; Karema Jara; Agustina Luján; Ludmila Miravet; Macarena Rodríguez
Group 3 ribbons + 2 balls	Brazil; Victória Borges; Julia Kurunczi; Mariana Vitória Gonçalves; Gabriella Coradine; Maria Flávia Britto; Maria Fernanda Moraes	Argentina; Milagros Centeno; Evangelina Cordier; Karema Jara; Agustina Luján; Ludmila Miravet; Macarena Rodríguez	Colombia; Lorena Duarte; Natalia Jiménez; Adriana Mantilla; Anamaría Márquez; Laura Patiño; Kizzy Rivas
All-around team	Brazil; Maria Eduarda Alexandre; Ana Luísa Neiva; Thainá Ramos; Victória Borges; Julia Kurunczi; Mariana Vitória Gonçalves; Gabriella Coradine; Maria Flávia Britto; Maria Fernanda Moraes	Argentina; Celeste D'Arcángelo; Martina Gil; Agostina Vargas Re; Milagros Centeno; Evangelina Cordier; Karema Jara; Agustina Luján; Ludmila Miravet; Macarena Rodríguez	Colombia; Lina Dussan; Vanessa Galindo; Oriana Viñas; Lorena Duarte; Natalia Jiménez; Adriana Mantilla; Anamaría Márquez; Laura Patiño; Kizzy Rivas

=== Senior A ===
Event	Gold	Silver	Bronze
Team all-around	Brazil; Júlia Castro; Emanuelle Felberk; Samara Sibin	Colombia; Manuela Gallego; Helena Londoño; Olivia Medina	Argentina; Camila Adoue; Martina Espejo; Lara Granero; Valentina Soza Lami
Individual all-around	Samara Sibin (BRA)	Emanuelle Felberk (BRA)	Gloriana Sánchez (CRC)
Hoop	Samara Sibin (BRA)	Manuela Gallego (COL)	Emanuelle Felberk (BRA)
Ball	Samara Sibin (BRA)	Sofia Delgado (CHI)	Olivia Medina (COL)
Clubs	Lara Granero (ARG)	Gloriana Sánchez (CRC)	Samara Sibin (BRA)
Ribbon	Emanuelle Felberk (BRA)	Manuela Gallego (COL)	Olivia Medina (COL)
Group all-around	Argentina	Colombia	—
Group 5 hoops	Colombia	Argentina	—
Group 3 ribbons + 2 balls	Argentina	Colombia	—
All-around team	Colombia	Argentina	—

== Medal table ==
Rank	Nation	Gold	Silver	Bronze	Total
1	Brazil (BRA)	13	2	5	20
2	Argentina (ARG)	5	7	3	15
3	Colombia (COL)	2	7	7	16
4	Chile (CHI)	0	3	0	3
5	Costa Rica (CRC)	0	1	1	2
Totals (5 entries)		20	20	16	56

== Participating nations ==
- Argentina
- Aruba
- Bolivia
- Brazil
- Chile
- Colombia
- Costa Rica (invited by Consugi)
- Peru
- Venezuela

== See also ==
- Gymnastics at the 2023 Pan American Games
