= Kaily Ramírez =

Venezuelan rhythmic gymnast

Personal information
- Full name: Kaily Roxet Ramírez Romero
- Born: 8 May 2007 (age 19) Miranda

Gymnastics career
- Discipline: Rhythmic gymnastics
- Country represented: Venezuela; (2025-present)
- Head coaches: Marilyz Cabello, Katty Araujo
Medal record
Rhythmic gymnastics
Representing Venezuela
South American Games
Silver medal – second place	2026 Santa Fe	Group All-Around
Silver medal – second place	2026 Santa Fe	5 Balls
Silver medal – second place	2026 Santa Fe	3 Hoops + 4 Clubs
South American Championships
Gold medal – first place	2025 Cochabamba	5 Ribbon
Gold medal – first place	2025 Cochabamba	3 Balls + 2 Hoops
Bronze medal – third place	2025 Cochabamba	All-Around Team
Bolivarian Games
Gold medal – first place	2025 Peru	Group All-Around
Gold medal – first place	2025 Peru	5 Ribbons

Kaily Roxet Ramírez Romero (born 8 May 2007) is a Venezuelan rhythmic gymnast. She represents Venezuela in international competitions as part of the senior group.

== Career ==
Ramírez integrated the Venezuelan national senior group in 2025, debuting at the Pan American Championships in Asunción where the group was 7th in the All-Around, 9th with 5 ribbons and 5th with 3 balls & 2 hoops. In August she was selected for the World Championships in Rio de Janeiro along Mariana Dona, Maria Victoria Escobar, Gabriela Rodriguez and Samantha Rojas. In Brazil they were 29th in the All-Around, 31st with 5 ribbons and 28th with 3 balls & 2 hoops. The following month the group won gold in the two event finals, as well as bronze in the all-around team, at the South American Championships in Cochabamba. In December she participated in the Bolivarian Games in Lima, winning gold in the All-Around and with 5 ribbons.

In March 2026 the group won silver with 3 hoops & 4 clubs at the Grand Prix in Saint Petersburg. She then competed at the European Cup in Baku, being 13th overall, 12th with 5 balls and 13th in the mixed event. At the Pan American Championships they were 6th in the All-Around, 7th with 5 balls and 6th with 3 hoops & 4 clubs. In September she was selected, with Camila Campos, Mariana Dona, Maria Escobar, Gabriela Rodriguez and Samanta Rojas, for the South American Games in Santa Fe where she won silver in the All-Around and in both event finals.
