= Martina Espejo =

Chilean rhythmic gymnast

- Full name: Martina Isidora Espejo Jeraldo
- Born: 7 February 2007 (age 19) Copiapo

Gymnastics career
- Discipline: Rhythmic gymnastics
- Country represented: Chile (2023-)
Medal record
Rhythmic gymnastics
Representing Chile
Pacific Rim Championships
| Gold medal – first place | 2024 Cali | 3 Ribbons + 2 Balls |
| Silver medal – second place | 2024 Cali | Group All-Around |
| Silver medal – second place | 2024 Cali | 5 Hoops |
South American Championships
| Silver medal – second place | 2023 Barranquilla | Group All-around |
| Silver medal – second place | 2023 Barranquilla | 5 Hoops |
| Silver medal – second place | 2025 Cochabamba | All-Around |
| Bronze medal – third place | 2025 Cochabamba | 5 Ribbons |
Pan American Championships
| Bronze medal – third place | 2024 Ciudad de Guatemala | 5 Hoops |
Bolivarian Games
| Gold medal – first place | 2025 Peru | 3 Balls + 2 Hoops |
| Silver medal – second place | 2025 Peru | Group All-Around |
| Silver medal – second place | 2025 Peru | 5 Ribbons |

Martina Isidora Espejo Jeraldo (born 7 February 2007) is a Chilean rhythmic gymnast. She represents her country in international competitions.

== Career ==
Martina debuted as a senior in 2023 when being incorporated into the national group, she took 7th place in the All-Around, 7th place with 5 hoops and 5th place with 3 ribbons & 2 balls at the Pan American Games. In October Espejo, along Antonia Gallegos, Annalena Ley, Isabel Lozano, Josefina Romero and Anneli Sepúlveda, won silver in the All-Around and with 5 hoops at the South American Championships.

In 2024 the group won two silver medal (All-Around and 5 hoops) and one gold in the mixed event at the Pacific Rim in Cali. In June she won an historical bronze medal in the 5 hoops final along Antonia Gallegos, Annalena Ley, Isabel Lozano and Martina Valdez, at the Pan American Championships in Ciudad de Guatemala.

In September 2025 she was selected for the South American Championships in Cochabamba along Antonia Gallegos, Annalena Ley, Isabel Lozano, Josefina Romero and Martina Valdes, winning silver in the All-Around and bronze with 5 ribbons.
