= Ana Luísa Neiva =

Brazilian rhythmic gymnast

Ana Luísa Passos Neiva
- Born: March 11, 2004 (age 22) Brasília, Brazil

Gymnastics career
- Discipline: Rhythmic gymnastics
- Country represented: Brazil (2019–)
- Club: Clube de Associados da Aeronáutica de Brasília (CASSAB)
- Head coach: Kely Espinola
Medal record
Rhythmic gymnastics
Representing Brazil
Pan American Championships
Silver medal – second place	2022 Rio de Janeiro	Team
South American Championships
Gold medal – first place	2021 Cali	Team
Gold medal – first place	2021 Cali	All-around team
Gold medal – first place	2023 Barranquilla	Team
Gold medal – first place	2023 Barranquilla	All-around team
Gold medal – first place	2024 Santiago	Team
Gold medal – first place	2024 Santiago	All-Around
Gold medal – first place	2024 Santiago	All-Around team
Gold medal – first place	2026 Asunción	Team
Silver medal – second place	2021 Cali	Ball
Silver medal – second place	2023 Barranquilla	Hoop
Silver medal – second place	2024 Santiago	Hoop
Silver medal – second place	2024 Santiago	Clubs
Silver medal – second place	2025 Cochabamba	Team
Silver medal – second place	2025 Cochabamba	All-Around Team
Silver medal – second place	2025 Cochabamba	Ball
Bronze medal – third place	2021 Cali	All-around
Bronze medal – third place	2021 Cali	Hoop
Bronze medal – third place	2021 Cali	Ribbon
Bronze medal – third place	2023 Barranquilla	All-around
Bronze medal – third place	2023 Barranquilla	Ball
Bronze medal – third place	2023 Barranquilla	Ribbon
Silver medal – second place	2025 Cochabamba	Ribbon

Ana Luísa Passos Neiva (born 11 March 2004) is a Brazilian rhythmic gymnast. She represents her country in international competitions.

== Personal life ==
Neiva took up the sport at age three in Brasília. Her dream is to compete at the Olympic Games like her idol Yana Kudryavtseva. She was named Best Rhythmic Gymnast of the Year in 2015 and 2017, as well as Outstanding Gymnast of the Year in 2017, by the Brasília Gymnastics Federation. In 2016 she was presented with the Brasília Sports Award in rhythmic gymnastics by the Brasília government.

== Career ==
=== Junior ===
Neiva debuted at the 2019 Junior Pan American Rhythmic Gymnastics Championships, taking 7th place. Then she represented Brazil at the Junior World Championships in Moscow, Russia, where she ended on 26th place in team competition and 29th place with clubs.

=== Senior ===
Ana became age-eligible for senior competitions in 2021. She participated in the World Championships in Kitakyushu, Japan, ending on 35th place in the all-around, 26th with hoop, 27th with ball, 51st with clubs and 38th with ribbon.

In 2022, at the Baku World Cup, she was 38th in the All-Around, 41st with hoop, 33rd with ball, 31st with clubs and 34th with ribbon. In Portimão she ended 34th in the All-Around and with hoop, 27th with ball, 29th with clubs and 41st with ribbon. In Pesaro she was 27th in the All-Around, 25th with hoop, 31st with ball, 27th with clubs and 29th with ribbon. In July she took part in the Pan American Championships in Rio de Janeiro being 11th in the All-Around and winning silver in teams, and the World Games in Birmingham taking 17th place with hoop and ball and 19th with clubs and ribbon. In the last World Cup stage of the year in Cluj-Napoca she was 27th in the All-Around, 28th with hoop, 26th with ball, 27th with clubs and 22nd with ribbon.

In 2023, she competed at the South American Rhythmic Gymnastics Championships where she won gold in teams (both individual and combined), silver with hoop and bronze in the All-Around as well as with ball and ribbon.

At the 2024 Brazilian Championships she won bronze in the All-Around, with hoop and with clubs.

In September 2025 she was selected for the South American Championships in Cochabamba, winning silver in teams (with Emanuelle Felberk and Samara Sibin), with ball and in all-around teams, as well as bronze with ribbon.

In July 2026, she represented Brazil at the 2026 South American Championships in Asunción, Paraguay, alongside Sarah Mourão and Samara Sibin. They won gold medal in team competition. She took 5th place in all-around.
