= 2025 South American Rhythmic Gymnastics Championships =

Rhythmic Gymnastics competition

- Location: Cochabamba, Bolivia
- Start date: 08 September 2025
- End date: 14 September 2025

The 2025 South American Rhythmic Gymnastics Championships were held in Cochabamba, Bolivia, from September 8 to 14, 2025. The competition is organised by the Bolivian Gymnastics Federation and approved by the International Gymnastics Federation. A parallel event, the South American Cup, was held alongside the South American Championships.

== Medalists ==
=== South American Championships ===
==== Senior ====
Event	Gold	Silver	Bronze
Team all-around	Argentina; Celeste D'Arcángelo; Martina Gil; Agostina Vargas Re	Brazil; Emanuelle Felberk; Ana Luísa Neiva; Samara Sibin	Venezuela; Luciana Caraballo; Jimena Dominguez; Alejandra Montilla
Individual all-around	Jimena Dominguez (VEN)	Celeste D'Arcángelo (ARG)	Agostina Vargas Re (ARG)
Hoop	Agostina Vargas Re (ARG)	Celeste D'Arcángelo (ARG)	Jimena Dominguez (VEN)
Ball	Celeste D'Arcángelo (ARG)	Ana Luísa Neiva (BRA)	Samara Sibin (BRA)
Clubs	Celeste D'Arcángelo (ARG)	Samara Sibin (BRA)	Jimena Dominguez (VEN)
Ribbon	Celeste D'Arcángelo (ARG)	Samara Sibin (BRA)	Ana Luísa Neiva (BRA)
Group all-around	Brazil; Beatriz Pereira; Bianca Reis; Thainá dos Santos; Mariana Spolon; Maria Fernanda Tashiro; Karoline Teles	Chile; Martina Espejo; Antonia Gallegos; Annalena Ley; Isabel Lozano; Josefina Romero; Martina Valdes	Argentina; Lucia Arrascaeta; Pilar Cattaneo; Lucia González; Camila Schaffer; Lara Vicentin
Group 5 ribbons	Venezuela; Mariana Dona; Maria Escobar; Kaily Ramírez; Gabriela Rodríguez; Samantha Rojas	Argentina; Lucia Arrascaeta; Pilar Cattaneo; Lucia González; Camila Schaffer; Lara Vicentin	Chile; Martina Espejo; Antonia Gallegos; Annalena Ley; Isabel Lozano; Josefina Romero; Martina Valdes
Group 3 balls + 2 hoops	Venezuela; Mariana Dona; Maria Escobar; Kaily Ramírez; Gabriela Rodríguez; Samantha Rojas	Brazil; Beatriz Pereira; Bianca Reis; Thainá dos Santos; Mariana Spolon; Maria Fernanda Tashiro; Karoline Teles	Argentina; Lucia Arrascaeta; Pilar Cattaneo; Lucia González; Camila Schaffer; Lara Vicentin
Duo + Trio	Brazil; Duo; Maria Flávia Britto; Maria Clara Fabri; Trio; Isadora Beduschi; Kendra Ávila; Nathália Nogueira	Chile; Duo; Martina Torrealba; Catalina Zapata; Trio; Martina Bracelis; Martina Chandia; Laura Yañez	Venezuela; Duo; Alessia Quintero; Fabiola Sulbaran; Trio; Angélica Briceño; Betania Melillo; Kamila Regardiz
Duo	Peru; Hannat Millet; Antonella Rocha	Argentina; Maria Paz González; Maria Sol González	Brazil; Maria Flávia Britto; Maria Clara Fabri
Trio	Brazil; Isadora Beduschi; Kendra Ávila; Nathália Nogueira	Venezuela; Angélica Briceño; Betania Melillo; Kamila Regardiz	Chile; Martina Bracelis; Martina Chandia; Laura Yañez
All-around team	Argentina; Celeste D'Arcángelo; Lucia Arrascaeta; Pilar Cattaneo; Martina Gil; Lucia González; Agostina Vargas Re; Camila Schaffer; Lara Vicentin	Brazil; Emanuelle Felberk; Ana Luísa Neiva; Beatriz Pereira; Bianca Reis; Thainá dos Santos; Samara Sibin; Mariana Spolon; Maria Fernanda Tashiro; Karoline Teles	Venezuela; Luciana Caraballo; Jimena Dominguez; Mariana Dona; Maria Escobar; Alejandra Montilla; Kaily Ramírez; Gabriela Rodríguez; Samantha Rojas

=== South American Cup ===
==== Age group ====
Event	Gold	Silver	Bronze
Team	Brazil; Lays Jorge; Linda Petersen	Venezuela; María Salas; Fiorella Varesano	Chile; Amanda Carreño; Matilde Yanucci
Hoop	Lays Jorge (BRA)	Abigail Riquelme (PAR)	María Salas (VEN)
Ball	Linda Petersen (BRA)	Catalina Ganino (ARG)	Amanda Carreño (CHI)
Clubs	Linda Petersen (BRA)	Fiorella Varesano (VEN)	Catalina Ganino (ARG)
Ribbon	Lays Jorge (BRA)	Abigail Riquelme (PAR)	María Salas (VEN)

==== Senior ====
Event	Gold	Silver	Bronze
Team	Brazil; Fernanda Alvaz; Renata Diniz; Stefhany Popoatzki	Colombia; Paula Flechas; Luna Henao; Manuela Gallego	Chile; Belen Díaz; Camila Hernández; Maite Urrutia; Anastacia Venegas
Individual All-Around	Renata Diniz (BRA)	Fernanda Alvaz (BRA)	Lara Granero (ARG)
Hoop	Fernanda Alvaz (BRA)	Renata Diniz (BRA)	Paula Flechas (COL)
Ball	Renata Diniz (BRA)	Fernanda Alvaz (BRA)	Paula Flechas (COL)
Clubs	Fernanda Alvaz (BRA)	Renata Diniz (BRA)	Lara Granero (ARG)
Ribbon	Fernanda Alvaz (BRA)	Renata Diniz (BRA)	Lara Granero (ARG)
Group all-around	Brazil; Giovana Aranda; Júlia Barrim; Letícia Gonçalves; Munique Jaskulski; Maria Clara Rocha; Rafaella Valaski	Chile; Florencia Avila; Florencia Cueto; Sofía Delgado; Amanda Depaux; Laura Machuca; Anastacia Venegas	—N/a
Group 5 ribbons	Brazil; Giovana Aranda; Júlia Barrim; Letícia Gonçalves; Munique Jaskulski; Maria Clara Rocha; Rafaella Valaski	Chile; Florencia Avila; Florencia Cueto; Sofía Delgado; Amanda Depaux; Laura Machuca; Anastacia Venegas	—N/a
Group 3 balls + 2 hoops	Brazil; Giovana Aranda; Júlia Barrim; Letícia Gonçalves; Munique Jaskulski; Maria Clara Rocha; Rafaella Valaski	Chile; Florencia Avila; Florencia Cueto; Sofía Delgado; Amanda Depaux; Laura Machuca; Anastacia Venegas	—N/a
Duo + Trio	Brazil; Duo; Isabella Ishikawa; Gabriela Oliveira; Trio; Mariana Alencar; Louise Farias; Luiza Magnan	Venezuela; Duo; Mariangelica Rivas; Kamila Villabona; Trio; Sofía Montilla; Valeria Pérez; Wilmerys Valera	Chile; Duo; Camila Rodríguez; Isidora Tapia; Trio; Antonia Fernández; Ziomara Mansilla; Maite Stocker
Duo	Brazil; Isabella Ishikawa; Gabriela Oliveira	Chile; Camila Rodriguez; Isidora Tapia	Venezuela; Mariangelica Rivas; Kamila Villabona
Trio	Brazil; Mariana Alencar; Louise Farias; Luiza Magnan	Venezuela; Sofía Montilla; Valeria Pérez; Wilmerys Valera	Uruguay; Agustina Hitateguy; María Sara Luque; Agustina Rodríguez
All-around team	Brazil; Fernanda Alvaz; Giovana Aranda; Júlia Barrim; Renata Diniz; Letícia Gonçalves; Munique Jaskulski; Stefhany Popoatzki; Maria Clara Rocha; Rafaella Valaski	Chile; Florencia Avila; Florencia Cueto; Sofía Delgado; Amanda Depaux; Belen Díaz; Camila Hernández; Laura Machuca; Maite Urrutia; Anastacia Venegas	—N/a

== Medal table ==
Rank	Nation	Gold	Silver	Bronze	Total
1	Brazil (BRA)	21	11	3	35
2	Argentina (ARG)	6	5	7	18
3	Venezuela (VEN)	3	5	8	16
4	Peru (PER)	1	0	0	1
5	Chile (CHI)	0	7	6	13
6	Paraguay (PAR)	0	2	0	2
7	Colombia (COL)	0	1	2	3
8	Uruguay (URU)	0	0	1	1
Totals (8 entries)		31	31	27	89

== Participating nations ==
- Argentina
- Bolivia
- Brazil
- Chile
- Colombia
- Ecuador
- Paraguay
- Peru
- Uruguay
- Venezuela

== See also ==
- 2025 Pan American Rhythmic Gymnastics Championships
- 2025 Junior South American Rhythmic Gymnastics Championships
