= 2021 South American Rhythmic Gymnastics Championships =

International rhythmic gymnastics competition

The 2021 South American Rhythmic Gymnastics Championships were held in Cali, Colombia, from November 4–7, 2021. The competition was organized by the Colombian Gymnastics Federation and approved by the International Gymnastics Federation.

== Medalists ==
=== Senior ===
Event	Gold	Silver	Bronze
Team all-around	Brazil; Bárbara Domingos; Andressa Jardim; Ana Luísa Neiva	Argentina; Sol Fainberg; Celeste D'Arcángelo; Candela Urso	Colombia; Lina Dussan; Vanessa Galindo; Nathalia Hurtado; Oriana Viñas
Individual all-around	Bárbara Domingos (BRA)	Sol Fainberg (ARG)	Ana Luísa Neiva (BRA)
Hoop	Bárbara Domingos (BRA)	Sol Fainberg (ARG)	Ana Luísa Neiva (BRA)
Ball	Bárbara Domingos (BRA)	Ana Luísa Neiva (BRA)	Sol Fainberg (ARG)
Clubs	Bárbara Domingos (BRA)	Sol Fainberg (ARG)	Lina Dussan (COL)
Ribbon	Bárbara Domingos (BRA)	Sol Fainberg (ARG)	Ana Luísa Neiva (BRA)
Group all-around	Brazil; Emilly de Almeida; Maria Eduarda Pedrinho; Mel Gomes; Rafaela Elias; Thainá Ramos	Argentina; Sol Raimo; Lucía Maccioni; Agustina Lujan; Evangelina Cordier; Karema Jara; Milagros Centeno	Peru; Antonella Rocha; Camila Rodríguez; Fabiana Presentación; Hannah Navas; Nicole Cumpa
Group 5 balls	Brazil; Emilly de Almeida; Maria Eduarda Pedrinho; Mel Gomes; Rafaela Elias; Thainá Ramos	Peru; Antonella Rocha; Camila Rodríguez; Fabiana Presentación; Hannah Navas; Nicole Cumpa	Argentina; Sol Raimo; Lucía Maccioni; Agustina Lujan; Evangelina Cordier; Karema Jara; Milagros Centeno
Group 3 hoops + 4 clubs	Brazil; Emilly de Almeida; Maria Eduarda Pedrinho; Mel Gomes; Rafaela Elias; Thainá Ramos	Colombia; Salomé Ricaurte; Isabela Salazar; Manuela Ramirez; Angelica Guerrero; Nicol Mora	Argentina; Sol Raimo; Lucía Maccioni; Agustina Lujan; Evangelina Cordier; Karema Jara; Milagros Centeno
All-around team	Brazil; Bárbara Domingos; Andressa Jardim; Ana Luísa Neiva; Emilly de Almeida; Maria Eduarda Pedrinho; Mel Gomes; Rafaela Elias; Thainá Ramos	Argentina; Sol Fainberg; Celeste D'Arcángelo; Candela Urso; Sol Raimo; Lucía Maccioni; Agustina Lujan; Evangelina Cordier; Karema Jara; Milagros Centeno	Colombia; Lina Dussan; Vanessa Galindo; Nathalia Hurtado; Oriana Viñas; Salomé Ricaurte; Isabela Salazar; Manuela Ramirez; Angelica Guerrero; Nicol Mora

=== Junior ===
Event	Gold	Silver	Bronze
Team all-around	Brazil; Maria Eduarda Alexandre; Isadora Oliveira; Emanuelle Felberk	Argentina; Lara Granero; Eugenia Angelin; Agostina Vargas Re	Colombia; Maria Jose Bedoya; Olivia Medina; Helena Londoño
Individual all-around	Maria Eduarda Alexandre (BRA)	Isadora Oliveira (BRA)	Lara Granero (ARG)
Hoop	Maria Eduarda Alexandre (BRA)	Isadora Oliveira (BRA)	Cibelle González (BOL)
Ball	Isadora Oliveira (BRA)	Emanuelle Felberk (BRA)	Lara Granero (ARG)
Clubs	Isadora Oliveira (BRA)	Lara Granero (ARG)	Agostina Vargas Re (ARG)
Ribbon	Maria Eduarda Alexandre (BRA)	Isadora Oliveira (BRA)	Lara Granero (ARG)
Group all-around	Brazil; Bianca Reis; Fernanda Heinemann; Gabryela da Rocha; Julia Kurunczi; Luiza Pugliese	Chile; María Fernanda Cerda; Consuelo Oelckers; Martina Acevedo; Stella Gasic; Maite Cárdenas	Argentina; Camila Schaffer; Paulina Anliker; Martina Olivera; Guillermina Santarone; Lucía Olivera
Group 5 balls	Brazil; Bianca Reis; Fernanda Heinemann; Gabryela da Rocha; Julia Kurunczi; Luiza Pugliese	Chile; María Fernanda Cerda; Consuelo Oelckers; Martina Acevedo; Stella Gasic; Maite Cárdenas	Argentina; Camila Schaffer; Paulina Anliker; Martina Olivera; Guillermina Santarone; Lucía Olivera
Group 5 ribbons	Brazil; Bianca Reis; Fernanda Heinemann; Gabryela da Rocha; Julia Kurunczi; Luiza Pugliese	Chile; María Fernanda Cerda; Consuelo Oelckers; Martina Acevedo; Stella Gasic; Maite Cárdenas	Colombia; Laura Patiño; Ana Maria Márquez; Isabella Ospina; Adriana Mantilla; Natalia Jiménez
All-around team	Brazil; Maria Eduarda Alexandre; Isadora Oliveira; Emanuelle Felberk; Bianca Reis; Fernanda Heinemann; Gabryela da Rocha; Julia Kurunczi; Luiza Pugliese	Argentina; Lara Granero; Eugenia Angelin; Agostina Vargas Re; Camila Schaffer; Paulina Anliker; Martina Olivera; Guillermina Santarone; Lucía Olivera	Chile; Trinidad Urrutia; Martina Ferrari; Nicole Torres; Catarina Ansejo; María Fernanda Cerda; Consuelo Oelckers; Martina Acevedo; Stella Gasic; Maite Cárdenas

== Medal table ==
=== Senior ===
Rank	Nation	Gold	Silver	Bronze	Total
1	Brazil (BRA)	10	1	3	14
2	Argentina (ARG)	0	7	3	10
3	Colombia (COL)	0	1	3	4
4	Peru (PER)	0	1	1	2
Totals (4 entries)		10	10	10	30

=== Junior ===
Rank	Nation	Gold	Silver	Bronze	Total
1	Brazil (BRA)	10	4	0	14
2	Argentina (ARG)	0	3	6	9
3	Chile (CHI)	0	3	1	4
4	Colombia (COL)	0	0	2	2
5	Bolivia (BOL)	0	0	1	1
Totals (5 entries)		10	10	10	30

=== Combined ===
Rank	Nation	Gold	Silver	Bronze	Total
1	Brazil (BRA)	20	5	3	28
2	Argentina (ARG)	0	10	9	19
3	Chile (CHI)	0	3	1	4
4	Colombia (COL)	0	1	5	6
5	Peru (PER)	0	1	1	2
6	Bolivia (BOL)	0	0	1	1
Totals (6 entries)		20	20	20	60
