= Isabel Lozano =

Chilean rhythmic gymnast

- Full name: Isabel Lozano Voticky
- Born: 17 March 2005 (age 21) Mexico

Gymnastics career
- Discipline: Rhythmic gymnastics
- Country represented: Chile; (2023-)
Medal record
Rhythmic gymnastics
Representing Chile
Pacific Rim Championships
Gold medal – first place	2024 Cali	3 Ribbons + 2 Balls
Silver medal – second place	2024 Cali	Group All-Around
Silver medal – second place	2024 Cali	5 Hoops
South American Championships
Silver medal – second place	2023 Barranquilla	Group All-around
Silver medal – second place	2023 Barranquilla	5 Hoops
Silver medal – second place	2025 Cochabamba	All-Around
Silver medal – second place	2026 Asunción	Group All-Around
Silver medal – second place	2026 Asunción	Group All-Around
Silver medal – second place	2026 Asunción	5 Balls
Silver medal – second place	2026 Asunción	3 Hoops + 4 Clubs
Bronze medal – third place	2025 Cochabamba	5 Ribbons
Bronze medal – third place	2026 Asunción	All-Around Team
Pan American Championships
Bronze medal – third place	2024 Ciudad de Guatemala	5 Hoops
South American Games
Bronze medal – third place	2022 Asunción	5 Hoops
Bolivarian Games
Gold medal – first place	2025 Peru	3 Balls + 2 Hoops
Silver medal – second place	2025 Peru	Group All-Around
Silver medal – second place	2025 Peru	5 Ribbons

Isabel Lozano Voticky (born 17 March 2005) is a Chilean-Mexican rhythmic gymnast.

== Career ==
Isabel was incorporated into the national group of Chile in 2023, she then took 7th place in the All-Around, 7th place with 5 hoops and 5th place with 3 ribbons & 2 balls at the Pan American Games. In October Espejo, along Antonia Gallegos, Annalena Ley, Martina Espejo, Josefina Romero and Anneli Sepúlveda, won silver in the All-Around and with 5 hoops at the South American Championships.

In 2024 the group won two silver medal (All-Around and 5 hoops) and one gold in the mixed event at the Pacific Rim in Cali. In June she won an historical bronze medal in the 5 hoops final along Antonia Gallegos, Martina Espejo, Annalena Ley and Martina Valdez, at the Pan American Championships in Ciudad de Guatemala.
