= Pilar Cattaneo =

Argentine rhythmic gymnast

- Born: 12 November 2007 (age 18) Cordoba, Argentina

Gymnastics career
- Discipline: Rhythmic gymnastics
- Country represented: Argentina (2022-present)
Medal record
Rhythmic gymnastics
Representing Argentina
Pan American Championships
Bronze medal – third place	2024 Ciudad de Guatemala	3 Ribbons + 2 Balls
South American Championships
Silver medal – second place	2025 Cochabamba	5 Ribbons
Silver medal – second place	2026 Asunción	All-Around Team
Bronze medal – third place	2025 Cochabamba	All-Around
Bronze medal – third place	2025 Cochabamba	3 Balls & 2 Hoops
Bronze medal – third place	2026 Asunción	Group All-Around
Bronze medal – third place	2026 Asunción	5 Balls
Bronze medal – third place	2026 Asunción	3 Hoops + 4 Clubs

Pilar Cattaneo (born 12 November 2007) is an Argentine rhythmic gymnast.

== Career ==
Cattaneo became a senior in 2023. She was asked to join the Argentine senior group and competed at the Pan American Championships in Guadalajara along with the other group members, Lara Aimeri, Maria Cantale, Ana Acosta, Lucia Arrascaeta, and Lucia González. They took 9th place in the all-around, 8th with 5 hoops and 10th with 3 ribbons and 2 balls.

In 2024 she won a historic bronze medal in the 3 ribbons & 2 balls final at the Pan American Championships in Ciudad de Guatemala, along with Lucia Arrascaeta, Lara Aimeri, Lucia González and Gabriela Vega.

In September 2025 she was selected for the South American Championships in Cochabamba along Lucia Arrascaeta, Lucia González, Camila Schaffer and Lara Vicentin, winning silver with 5 ribbons, bronze in the All-Around and with 3 balls & 2hoops.
