= Lucia González (gymnast, born 2007) =

Argentine rhythmic gymnast

- Full name: Lucia Belen González Negri
- Born: 15 May 2007 (age 19)

Gymnastics career
- Discipline: Rhythmic gymnastics
- Country represented: Argentina; (2022-present)
Medal record
Rhythmic gymnastics
Representing Argentina
Pan American Championships
Bronze medal – third place	2024 Guatemala City	3 Ribbons + 2 Balls
South American Championships
Gold medal – first place	2025 Cochabamba	All-Around Team
Silver medal – second place	2025 Cochabamba	5 Ribbons
Bronze medal – third place	2025 Cochabamba	Group All-Around
Bronze medal – third place	2025 Cochabamba	3 Balls + 2 Hoops
Junior South American Championships
Silver medal – second place	2022 Paipa	Group All-Around
Silver medal – second place	2022 Paipa	All-Around Team
Silver medal – second place	2022 Paipa	5 Balls
Bronze medal – third place	2022 Paipa	5 Ropes

Lucia Belen González Negri (born 2007) is an Argentine rhythmic gymnast.

== Career ==
Lara was part of junior group, along Lucia Arrascaeta, Lara Aimeri, Morena Martinengo and Victoria Torres, that won silver in the All-Around and with 5 balls as well as bronze with 5 ropes at the 2022 South American Championships.

She became a senior the following year, competing at the 2023 Pan American Championships in Guadalajara as a member of the national group along Pilar Cattaneo, Victoria Cantale Olivero, Ana Laura Acosta, Lucia Arrascaeta, and Lara Aimeri. They took 9th place in the All-Around, 8th with 5 hoops and 10 with 3 ribbons & 2 balls.

In 2024 she won an historical bronze medal in the 3 ribbons & 2 balls at the Pan American Championships in Ciudad de Guatemala along Lucia Arrascaeta, Pilar Cattaneo, Lara Aimeri and Gabriela Vega.
