= Sol Martinez Fainberg =

Spanish-Argentine rhythmic gymnast

Sol Martínez Fainberg
- Born: 13 November 2002 (age 23) Oviedo, Spain

Gymnastics career
- Discipline: Rhythmic gymnastics
- Country represented: Argentina; (2015–2023)
- Club: Team Ritmo
- Head coach: Ruth Fernández Menéndez
- Retired: 2023
Medal record
Rhythmic gymnastics
Representing Argentina
Event	1st	2nd	3rd
FIG World Cup	0	0	1
Total	0	0	1
Pan American Championships
Silver medal – second place	2021 Rio de Janeiro	Clubs
Silver medal – second place	2022 Rio de Janeiro	Ball
Silver medal – second place	2022 Rio de Janeiro	Ribbon
Bronze medal – third place	2021 Rio de Janeiro	Ribbon
Bronze medal – third place	2022 Rio de Janeiro	Hoop
South American Games
Silver medal – second place	2022 Asunción	Clubs
Bronze medal – third place	2022 Asunción	Hoop
Bronze medal – third place	2022 Asunción	Ball
Bronze medal – third place	2022 Asunción	All-around
South American Championships
Gold medal – first place	2019 Bogotá	Clubs
Silver medal – second place	2019 Bogotá	Hoop
Silver medal – second place	2019 Bogotá	Ball
Silver medal – second place	2021 Cali	Team
Silver medal – second place	2021 Cali	All-around team
Silver medal – second place	2021 Cali	All-around
Silver medal – second place	2021 Cali	Hoop
Silver medal – second place	2021 Cali	Clubs
Silver medal – second place	2021 Cali	Ribbon
Bronze medal – third place	2021 Cali	Ball

Sol Martínez Fainberg (born 13 November 2002, Oviedo) is a retired Spanish-Argentine rhythmic gymnast. She is a three-time Pan American Gymnastics Championships medalist and the first Argentine gymnast to win a medal at the World Challenge Cup. She announced her retirement on 24 March 2023.

== Career ==
Martínez began competing in rhythmic gymnastics at age 7 and, while she was born in, lives in, and competed locally for Spain, she represented Argentina at the international level from 2015 until her 2023 retirement. She competed in the 2017 Pan American Acrobatic Gymnastics Championships in Daytona Beach, Florida, United States and finished 7th in the all-around final, 10th with hoop, 8th with ball, 6th with clubs, and 7th with ribbon.

She debuted in the senior category in 2018 at the Rhythmic Gymnastics Grand Prix in Moscow but did not advance to the finals. She competed in but did not place at the Pan American Championship in Lima, Peru in 2018 or at the World Challenge Cup in Pesaro, Italy and Guadalajara, Spain in 2018 or 2019.

In 2021, she competed in the World Cup in Sofia, Bulgaria, part of the qualifying rounds for the 2020 Tokyo Olympics. She placed 4th in the team competition and as all-around, and won silver with clubs and bronze with ribbon. Martínez started 2022 by competing at the World Cup in Sofia and then Baku, garnering average scores at both events. Still, she became the first Argentine gymnast to earn a medal in the World Cup circuit when she won bronze with hoop. At the 2022 South American Games, she earned silver in clubs and two bronzes in hoop and ball.

== Routine music information ==
Year	Apparatus	Music title and artist	Ref
2018	Hoop	"Love Remembered" by Wojciech Kilar	
2018	Ball	"Dangerous" by David Garrett, Royal Philharmonic Orchestra, and Franck van der Heijden	
2018	Clubs	"Весёлая кадриль" by Anna Litvinenko	
2018	Ribbon	"Мегаполис" by Bel Suono	
2019	Hoop	"Love Remembered" by Wojciech Kilar	
2019	Ball	"Happiness Does Not Wait" by Ólafur Arnalds	
2019	Clubs	"Yo Soy Maria" by Milva and Astor Piazzolla	
2019	Ribbon	"It's Raining Men" by Geri Halliwell	
2020	Hoop	"Fringe Theme" by David Wilde	
2020	Ball	"Happiness Does Not Wait" by Ólafur Arnalds	
2020	Clubs	"Yo Soy Maria" by Milva and Astor Piazzolla	
2020	Ribbon	"It's Raining Men" by Geri Halliwell	
2021	Hoop	"Fringe Theme" by David Wilde	
2021	Ball	"Happiness Does Not Wait" by Ólafur Arnalds	
2021	Clubs	"Yo Soy Maria" by Milva and Astor Piazzolla	
2021	Ribbon	"It's Raining Men" by Geri Halliwell	
2022	Hoop	"A Taste of Elegance" by Anne-Sophie Versnaeyen and Gabriel Saban	
2022	Ball	"La Terre Vue Du Ciel" by Armand Amar	
2022	Clubs	"Alegrias" by Luis Moneo, Antonio Jero, and Santiago Moreno	
2022	Ribbon	"Carnavalera by Havana Delirio	
2023	Hoop	"A Taste of Elegance" by Anne-Sophie Versnaeyen and Gabriel Saban	
2023	Ball	"With Or Without You" by U2	
2023	Clubs	"Alegrias" by Luis Moneo, Antonio Jero, and Santiago Moreno	
2023	Ribbon	"Carnavalera" by Havana Delirio	
