= Samara Sibin =

Brazilian rhythmic gymnast (born 2002)

- Full name: Samara Arcalá Sibin
- Born: May 29, 2002 (age 24) Cascavel

Gymnastics career
- Discipline: Rhythmic gymnastics
- Country represented: Brazil; (2017-present)
- Club: AGITO
Medal record
Rhythmic gymnastics
Representing Brazil
South American Championships
| Gold medal – first place | 2023 Barranquilla | Team (Senior A) |
| Gold medal – first place | 2023 Barranquilla | All-Around (Senior A) |
| Gold medal – first place | 2023 Barranquilla | Hoop (Senior A) |
| Gold medal – first place | 2023 Barranquilla | Ball (Senior A) |
| Gold medal – first place | 2024 Santiago | Team |
| Gold medal – first place | 2024 Santiago | All-Around Team |
| Gold medal – first place | 2026 Asunción | Team |
| Gold medal – first place | 2026 Asunción | All-Around |
| Gold medal – first place | 2026 Asunción | Ball |
| Gold medal – first place | 2026 Asunción | All-Around Team |
| Silver medal – second place | 2025 Cochabamba | Team |
| Silver medal – second place | 2025 Cochabamba | All-Around Team |
| Silver medal – second place | 2026 Asunción | Hoop |
| Silver medal – second place | 2026 Asunción | Ribbon |
| Bronze medal – third place | 2023 Barranquilla | Clubs (Senior A) |
| Bronze medal – third place | 2024 Santiago | All-Around |
| Bronze medal – third place | 2024 Santiago | Ball |
| Bronze medal – third place | 2024 Santiago | Clubs |
| Bronze medal – third place | 2024 Santiago | Ribbon |
| Bronze medal – third place | 2026 Asunción | Clubs |

Samara Arcalá Sibin (born 29 May 2002) is a Brazilian rhythmic gymnast. She represents Brazil in international competitions.

== Career ==
In 2017 Sibin was selected for the Pan American Championships in Daytona Beach, being 5th in teams, 19th overall, 14th with hoop, 28th with ball, 21st with clubs and 18th with ribbon.

She became a senior in 2018, competing for the first time in this category at the Brazilian Championships, taking 5th place in the All-Around and winning bronze in teams.

In 2023 she took part in the Aphrodite Cup in Athens where she was 36th overall. In July she won silver with ribbon, behind Geovanna Santos, at nationals. In October she competed in the “Senior A” section of the South American Championships in Barranquilla, winning gold in teams (along Júlia Castro and Emanuelle Felberk), the All-Around, with hoop, with ball as well as bronze with clubs.

In 2024 she competed in the World Cup in Milan, being 32nd in the All-Around, 28th with hoop, 22nd with ball, 39th with clubs and 31st with ribbon. At the Brazilian Championships she won gold in teams and bronze with ribbon.

Competing at the 2025 World Challenge Cup in Portimão she took 16th placein the All-Around, 20th with hoop, 16th with ball, 22nd with clubs and 13th with ribbon. In September 2025 she was selected for the South American Championships in Cochabamba, winning silver in teams (with Emanuelle Felberk and Ana Luísa Neiva), with clubs, with ribbon and in all-around teams, as well as bronze with ball.

At the 2026 Brazilian Championships she won bronze with hoop and with ball.

In September 2026, Sibin competed at the inaugural edition of the Troféu Brasil de Ginástica Rítmica, held in Florianópolis, Santa Catarina. She won the all-around title with a score of 103.850 points. She also won gold medals in the hoop, ball and ribbon finals.
