= Thainá Ramos =

Brazilian rhythmic gymnast

- Full name: Thainá Ramos dos Santos
- Born: October 9, 2001 (age 24) São Paulo

Gymnastics career
- Discipline: Rhythmic gymnastics
- Country represented: Brazil; (2017)
- Head coach: Camila Ferezin
Medal record
Rhythmic gymnastics
Representing Brazil
South American Championships
Gold medal – first place	2021 Cali	Group all-around
Gold medal – first place	2021 Cali	All-around team
Gold medal – first place	2021 Cali	5 balls
Gold medal – first place	2021 Cali	3 hoops + 4 clubs
Gold medal – first place	2023 Barranquilla	Team
Gold medal – first place	2023 Barranquilla	All-around team
Silver medal – second place	2021 Florianópolis	All-around team
Gold medal – first place	2023 Curitiba	All-around team
Gold medal – first place	2023 Mato Grosso	All-around
Gold medal – first place	2015 Cochabamba	5 balls
Gold medal – first place	2015 Cochabamba	5 ribbon
Silver medal – second place	2016 Trabzon	Group all-around
Bronze medal – third place	2016 Trabzon	All-around team
Gold medal – first place	2015 Espírito Santo	All-around team
Silver medal – second place	2016 Florianópolis	All-around team

Thainá Ramos (born 09 October 2001) is a Brazilian rhythmic gymnast. She represents her country in international competitions.

== Career ==
In July 2020 Thainá has been called up to join the Brazilian team, aiming to prepare for qualifying for the Tokyo Olympics. The following year she competed World Cups in Sofia and Tashkent and then at the South American Championships in Cali, winning gold in the All-Around, with 5 balls, 3 hoops + 4 clubs and in the overall team.

In 2023 she competed as an individual at the 2023 South American Championships winning gold in team, both individual and combined.
