= Oriana Viñas =

Colombian rhythmic gymnast

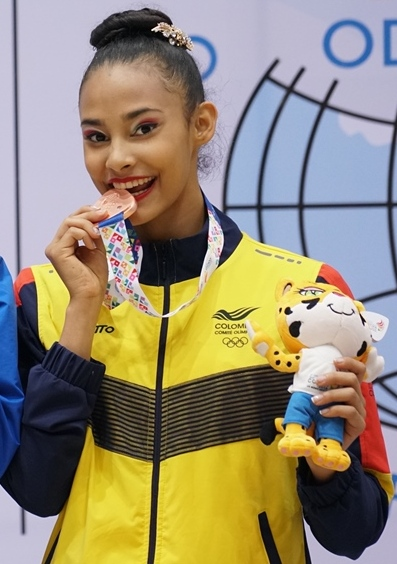
- Viñas at the 2018 South American Games
- Full name: Oriana Valentina Viñas Perez
- Born: 29 January 2002 (age 24) Caracas, Venezuela
- Height: 168 cm (5 ft 6 in)

Gymnastics career
- Discipline: Rhythmic gymnastics
- Country represented: Colombia; (2018–)
- Training location: Sogamoso, Colombia
- Head coach: Mariangel Balza
Medal record
Rhythmic gymnastics
Representing Colombia
Pacific Rim Championships
Bronze medal – third place	2024 Cali	Team
Central American and Caribbean Games
Silver medal – second place	2023 San Salvador	Team
Bronze medal – third place	2023 San Salvador	Ball
Bronze medal – third place	2026 Santo Domingo	Team
South American Games
Bronze medal – third place	2018 Cochabamba	Ball
South American Championships
Silver medal – second place	2018 Melgar	Team
Silver medal – second place	2022 Paipa	Hoop
Silver medal – second place	2024 Santiago	Ball
Bronze medal – third place	2018 Melgar	Ball
Bronze medal – third place	2021 Cali	Team
Bronze medal – third place	2021 Cali	All-around team
Bronze medal – third place	2022 Paipa	Team
Bronze medal – third place	2022 Paipa	All-around team
Bronze medal – third place	2023 Barranquilla	Team
Bronze medal – third place	2021 Barranquilla	All-around team
Bronze medal – third place	2024 Santiago	Hoop
Bolivarian Games
Gold medal – first place	2025 Peru	Team
Gold medal – first place	2025 Peru	All-Around
Silver medal – second place	2025 Peru	Hoop
Silver medal – second place	2025 Peru	Clubs
Silver medal – second place	2025 Peru	Ribbon
Bronze medal – third place	2025 Peru	Ball

Oriana Valentina Viñas Perez (born 29 January 2002) is a Venezuelan-born rhythmic gymnast who represents Colombia in competitions. She participated in the Rhythmic Gymnastics World Championships in 2019 and 2023.

== Early life ==
Viñas took up rhythmic gymnastics at age six. She was initially a swimmer but had to stop swimming after suffering from hypothermia. Born in Venezuela, she has held Colombian citizenship since the age of 12, as her father is from Colombia. She moved there at age 14, following coach Mariangel Balza, who encouraged her to begin representing Colombia. The International Gymnastics Federation cleared her to compete for Colombia in 2017.

== Career ==
At the 2017 Junior Pan American Championships, Viñas helped Colombia finish seventh in the team event. Individually, she finished 12th in the all-around and 8th in the ribbon final.

Viñas became age-eligible for senior competitions in 2018. She won a bronze medal with the ball at the 2018 South American Games, behind Bárbara Domingos and Lina Dussan. At the Pan American Championships, she was 18th in the all-around and fifth with the team. In October 2018, she won a silver medal in the team event and a bronze medal with the ball at the South American Championships.

Viñas competed at the 2019 World Championships and finished 81st in the all-around qualifications. She helped Colombia finish 34th in the team competition. She helped Colombia win the team bronze medal at the 2021 South American Championships. At the 2022 South American Games, she finished fifth in the clubs final and seventh in the ribbon final. Then at the 2022 South American Championships, she won a bronze medal with team Colombia. She won a silver medal in the hoop final behind Geovanna Santos.

At the 2023 Pan American Championships, Viñas finished seventh in the all-around and clubs, sixth in the hoop, ball, and ribbon. She then won a team silver medal and a ball bronze medal at the 2023 Central American and Caribbean Games. She competed at the 2023 World Championships and finished 64th in the all-around qualifications. She then represented Colombia at the 2023 Pan American Games and finished 12th in the all-around. She then helped Colombia win the team bronze medal at the 2023 South American Championships.

Viñas won a team bronze medal at the 2024 Pacific Rim Championships. At the 2024 South American Championships, she won a bronze medal with the hoop and a silver medal with the ball.
