= Maria Eduarda Alexandre =

Brazilian rhythmic gymnast (born 2007)

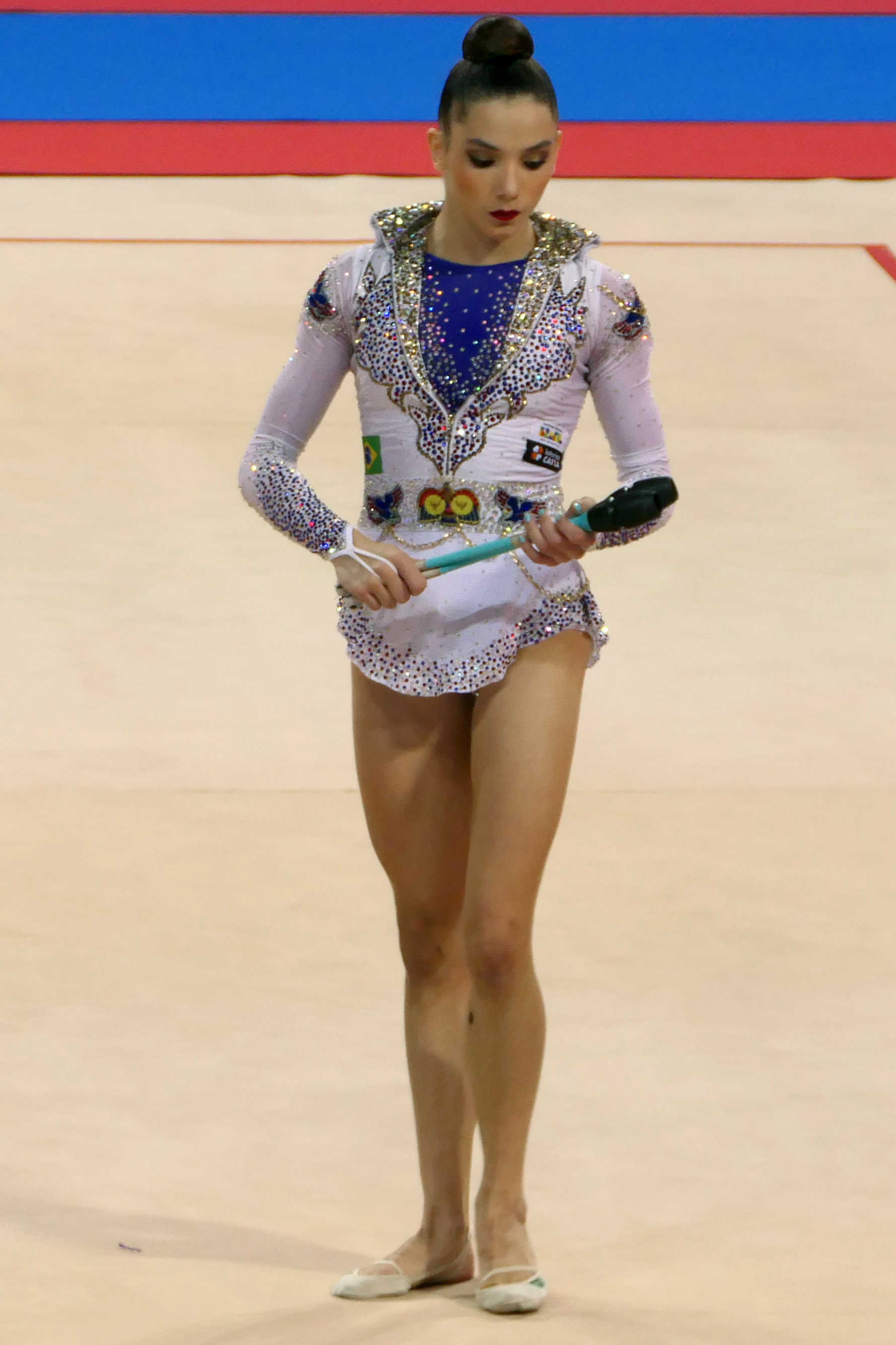
- Alexandre in 2024

Personal information
- Born: May 15, 2007 (age 19) Florianópolis, Brazil

Gymnastics career
- Discipline: Rhythmic gymnastics
- Country represented: Brazil; (2021–)
- Club: AGITO/PR
- Head coach: Solange Martins Paludo
Medal record
Rhythmic gymnastics
Representing Brazil
Pan American Games
Gold medal – first place	2023 Santiago	Hoop
Gold medal – first place	2023 Santiago	Clubs
Silver medal – second place	2023 Santiago	Ribbon
Bronze medal – third place	2023 Santiago	All-around
Pan American Championships
Gold medal – first place	2024 Ciudad de Guatemala	Team
Gold medal – first place	2024 Ciudad de Guatemala	Ball
Gold medal – first place	2024 Ciudad de Guatemala	Ribbon
Gold medal – first place	2026 Rio de Janeiro	Team
Silver medal – second place	2026 Rio de Janeiro	Ball
Silver medal – second place	2026 Rio de Janeiro	Clubs
Bronze medal – third place	2024 Ciudad de Guatemala	All-around
Bronze medal – third place	2024 Ciudad de Guatemala	Clubs
South American Games
Gold medal – first place	2026 Santa Fe	All-Around
Gold medal – first place	2026 Santa Fe	Hoop
Gold medal – first place	2026 Santa Fe	Ribbon
Silver medal – second place	2026 Santa Fe	Ball
Silver medal – second place	2026 Santa Fe	Clubs
South American Championships
Gold medal – first place	2023 Barranquilla	Team
Gold medal – first place	2023 Barranquilla	All-around
Gold medal – first place	2023 Barranquilla	Clubs
Gold medal – first place	2023 Barranquilla	Ribbon
Gold medal – first place	2023 Barranquilla	All-around team
Junior Pan American Games
Gold medal – first place	2021 Cali	All-around
Gold medal – first place	2021 Cali	Ball
Gold medal – first place	2021 Cali	Clubs
Silver medal – second place	2021 Cali	Hoop
Junior Pan American Championships
Gold medal – first place	2022 Rio de Janeiro	Clubs
Silver medal – second place	2022 Rio de Janeiro	Team
Silver medal – second place	2022 Rio de Janeiro	All-around
Silver medal – second place	2022 Rio de Janeiro	Ribbon
Bronze medal – third place	2022 Rio de Janeiro	Hoop
Bronze medal – third place	2022 Rio de Janeiro	Ball
Junior South American Championships
Gold medal – first place	2021 Cali	Team
Gold medal – first place	2021 Cali	All-around team
Gold medal – first place	2021 Cali	All-around
Gold medal – first place	2021 Cali	Hoop
Gold medal – first place	2021 Cali	Ribbon
Gold medal – first place	2022 Paipa	Team
Gold medal – first place	2022 Paipa	All-around team
Gold medal – first place	2022 Paipa	All-around
Gold medal – first place	2022 Paipa	Hoop
Gold medal – first place	2022 Paipa	Ball
Gold medal – first place	2022 Paipa	Clubs
Gold medal – first place	2022 Paipa	Ribbon

Maria Eduarda Alexandre (born 15 May 2007) is a Brazilian rhythmic gymnast. She is the 2023 Pan American Games all-around bronze medalist and the 2024 Pan American Championships all-around bronze medalist.

On national level, she is the 2024 Brazilian all-around champion and the 2026 all-around bronze medalist.

== Career ==
=== Junior ===
At the South American Championships in November 2021, Alexandre won the junior all-around and the junior hoop and ribbon finals, in addition to team gold along with the other Brazilian gymnasts.

In December, she competed at the 2021 Junior Pan American Games in Cali, Colombia. As it was the event's first edition, she became its first winner by winning the all-around. In the apparatus finals, she also won ball and clubs gold and silver with hoop.

The following year, she appeared in the International Tournament Junior at Portimao. At the Junior Pan American Championships in Rio de Janeiro, Brazil, she won gold with clubs, silvers in teams, the all-around and ribbon, and bronze with hoop and ball. She also defended her title of South American Junior Champion in Paipa at the 2022 South American Championships, and she won gold in every apparatus final and the team event as well.

=== Senior ===
==== 2023 ====
In 2023 she debuted in the senior category at the Aphrodite Cup in Athens, where she placed 13th in the all-around. She qualified for the clubs final and placed fourth. At the World Cup in Tashkent, she took 17th place in the all-around, 26th with ball, 36th with clubs and 12th with ribbon. She advanced to the hoop final and placed 7th. At the World Cup stage in Baku, she was 34th in the all-around, 31st with ball, 51st with clubs and 36th with ribbon. She again qualified for the hoop final, where she placed 5th.

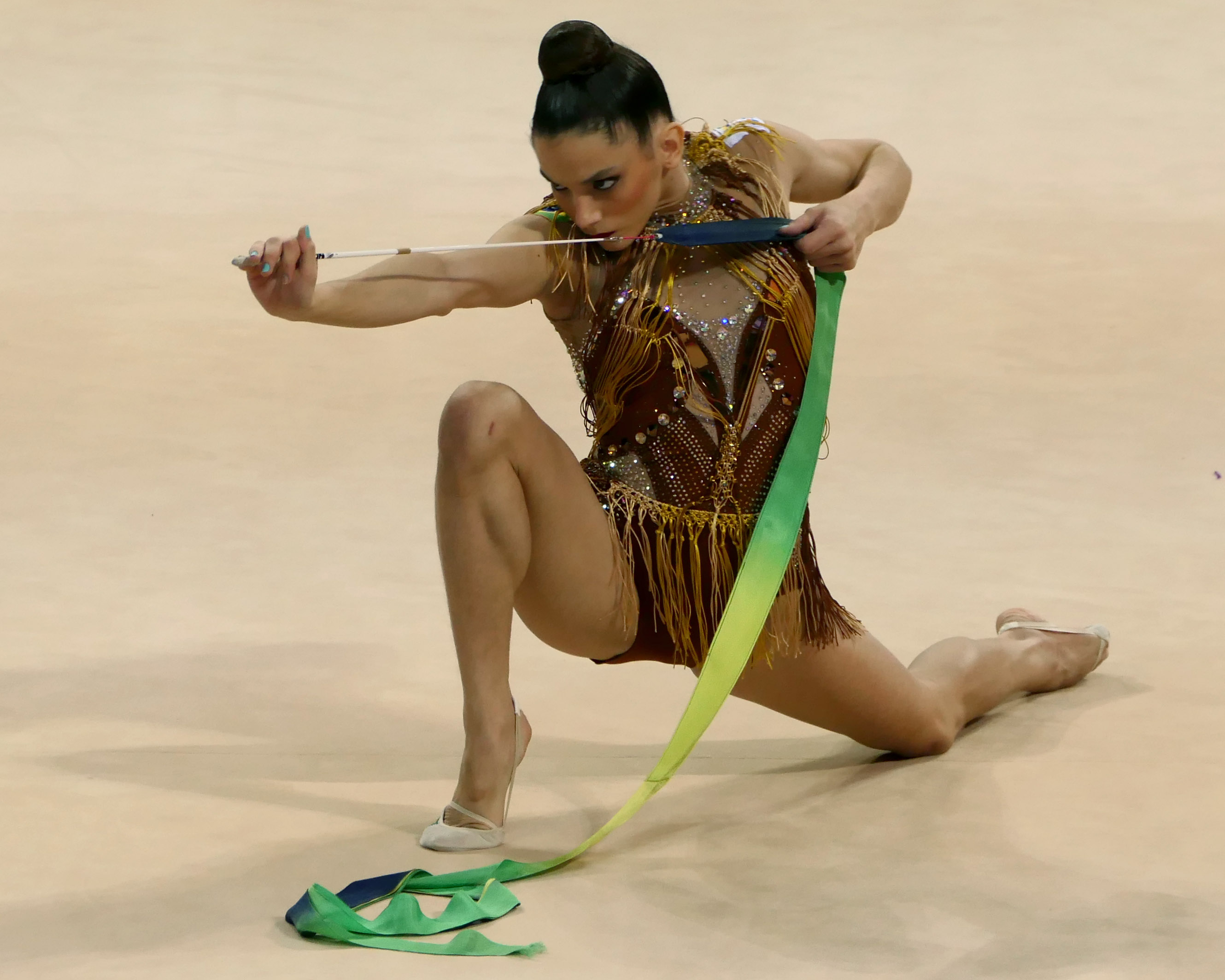
Alexandre's starting pose with ribbon at the 2024 Sofia World Cup

In July she participated in the Brazilian Championship, where she won the all-around silver medal behind Geovanna Santos. She also won gold in hoop and silver in ball and clubs. In November she competed at her first senior Pan American Games in Santiago, Chile. She won bronze in the all-around. In the finals, she won gold in the hoop and clubs and silver in ribbon.

==== 2024 ====
In 2024, she competed at the Sofia World Cup and finished 15th in the all-around. She qualified to the ball final and took 6th place. In June, she participated in the 2024 Pan American Championships in Guatemala City. There she won the all-around bronze and three additional medal in the apparatus finals, gold with clubs and hoop and silver with ribbon. She also won gold in the team competition with the other Brazilian gymnasts. She continued her season in July at the Milan World Cup, taking 9th place in the all-around and 8th in the ribbon final. In September, she won gold medal in all-around at Brazilian National Championships. She also won gold in hoop and clubs and silver in ball final.

==== 2025 ====
In 2025, Alexandre started the season competing at the Sofia World Cup, where she took 27th place in the all-around. She qualified to the ribbon final and finished in 8th place. In April, she took 18th place in the all-around at the Baku World Cup. In May, she participated in the Cluj-Napoca World Challenge Cup and ended in 12th place.

==== 2026 ====
In 2026, she again started the season by competing at the Sofia World Cup; she finished in 20th place in the all-around. On 3-5 April, she competed at the Grand Prix Thiais, where she placed 6th place in the all-around. She was also 6th in clubs and 7th in the ribbon final. On 17-19 April, she was 12th in the all-around at the Baku World Cup and qualified to two apparatus finals (ball, ribbon). She finished 6th in both. In May, she won bronze medal in all-around at Brazilian National Championships.

In June, she represented Brazil at the 2026 Pan American Championships in Rio de Janeiro. Together with Barbara Domingos and Geovanna Santos, she won the gold medal in the team competition. She also won two silver medals in the ball and clubs finals. Then she competed at World Challenge Cup Cluj-Napoca and took 11th place in the all-around, due to mistakes in two out of four routines. She qualified to two apparatus finals, placing 6th in ball and 4th in ribbon. She was tied in her ribbon score with Daniela Munits, who won the bronze medal because of her higher execution score.

In August, she represented Brazil at the 2026 World Championships in Frankfurt, Germany. She took 10th place in ball and 12th place in ribbon qualifications. In the team competition, she placed 7th alongside Bárbara Domingos, Geovanna Santos and the senior group. In September, she represented Brazil alongside Geovanna Santos and Barbara Domingos at the 2026 South American Games in Rosario, Argentina. She won gold medals in the all-around, hoop and ribbon, and silver in ball and clubs.

== Routine music information ==
Year	Apparatus	Music Title
2026	Hoop	
2026	Ball	Everybody Wants to Rule the World by Cinematic Pop, Spencer Jones & Mckenna Breinholt
2026	Clubs	
2026	Ribbon	Berghain by Rosalía, Björk & Yves Tumor
2025	Hoop	Emoções by Roberto Carlos
2025	Ball	Clouds, The Mind on the (Re)wind by Ezio Bosso
2025	Clubs	
2025	Ribbon	Mana Part 2 by Last Voices, Quest For Souls by David Marsden, Jungle by Last Voices
2024	Hoop	Симфоническая by Vitas
2024	Ball	Clouds, The Mind on the (Re)wind by Ezio Bosso
2024	Clubs	A Big Hunk o' Love by Elvis Presley, The Royal Philharmonic Orchestra
2024	Ribbon	Mana Part 2 by Last Voices, Quest For Souls by David Marsden, Jungle by Last Voices
2023	Hoop	Симфоническая by Vitas
2023	Ball	Clouds, The Mind on the (Re)wind by Ezio Bosso
2023	Clubs	A Big Hunk o' Love by Elvis Presley, The Royal Philharmonic Orchestra
2023	Ribbon	Mana Part 2 by Last Voices, Quest For Souls by David Marsden, Jungle by Last Voices
