= Brazilian Rhythmic Gymnastics Championships =

The Brazilian Rhythmic Gymnastics Championships is one of the main annual national rhythmic gymnastics competitions held in Brazil. Its first edition took place in 1971, with the participation of three federations, the Carioca Gymnastics Federation (FCG), the Rio de Janeiro State Gymnastics Federation (FGRJ) and the Minas Gerais Gymnastics Federation (FMG). The Brazilian Championship is divided into two different events, one for individual events and the other for group events, known as the Ilona Peuker Brazilian Rhythmic Gymnastics Championships.

== Medalists ==
=== Teams ===
Games	Gold	Silver	Bronze
1971-2010	Unknown	Unknown	Unknown
2011 Guarulhos			
2012 Goiânia			
2013 Vitória			
2014 Vitória	Grêmio Náutico União	Escola de Campeãs	Clube dos Oficias
2015 Vitória	Escola de Campeãs	AER Sadia	Clube Agir
2016 Aracaju	Escola de Campeãs	Clube Agir	AER Sadia
2017 Vitória	Escola de Campeãs	Clube Agir	AER Sadia
2018 Curitiba	Escola de Campeãs	Clube Agir	AER Sadia
2019 Rio de Janeiro	Clube Agir	Escola de Campeãs	Clube Ítalo Brasileiro
2021 Aracaju	Clube Agir	Escola de Campeãs	Grêmio Náutico União
2022 São Caetano do Sul	Clube Agir	AGITO	Grêmio Náutico União
2023 Campo Grande	AGITO	Instituto Capixaba Esportivo	
2024 Lauro de Freitas	AGITO	INCESP	Escola de Campeãs

=== Individual ===
==== All-Around ====
Games	Gold	Silver	Bronze
1971-1999	Unknown	Unknown	Unknown
2000	Ana Maria Maciel (Unopar)		
2001-2010	Unknown	Unknown	Unknown
2011 Guarulhos			
2012 Goiânia			
2013 Vitória			
2014 Vitória	Natália Gaudio (Escola de Campeãs)	Andressa Jardim (Grêmio Náutico União)	Ana Paula Ribeiro (Clube dos Oficias); Stephany Gonçalves (Grêmio Náutico União)
2015 Vitória	Natália Gaudio (Escola de Campeãs)	Angélica Kvieczynski (AER Sadia)	Simone Luiz (AER Sadia)
2016 Aracaju	Natália Gaudio (Escola de Campeãs)	Bárbara Domingos (Clube Agir)	Karine Walter (AER Sadia)
2017 Vitória	Bárbara Domingos (Clube Agir)	Natália Gaudio (Escola de Campeãs)	Mariany Miyamoto (AGRDJ)
2018 Curitiba	Natália Gaudio (Escola de Campeãs)	Bárbara Domingos (Clube Agir)	Heloisa Bornal (ADR Unopar)
2019 Rio de Janeiro	Bárbara Domingos (Clube Agir)	Natália Gaudio (Escola de Campeãs)	Geovanna Santos (Clube Ítalo Brasileiro)
2021 Aracaju	Bárbara Domingos (Clube Agir)	Natália Gaudio (Escola de Campeãs)	Ana Luísa Neiva (CASSAB)
2022 São Caetano do Sul	Bárbara Domingos (Clube Agir)	Geovanna Santos (Clube Ítalo Brasileiro)	Ana Luísa Neiva (CASSAB)
2023 Campo Grande	Geovanna Santos (Clube Ítalo Brasileiro)	Maria Eduarda Alexandre (AGITO/PR)	Emanuelle Rocha (EC/ES)
2024 Lauro de Freitas	Maria Eduarda Alexandre (AGITO/PR)	Geovanna Santos (Clube Ítalo Brasileiro)	Ana Luísa Neiva
2025 Rio de Janeiro	Bárbara Domingos (Clube Agir)	Geovanna Santos (Clube Ítalo Brasileiro)	Ana Luísa Neiva
2026 Natal	Bárbara Domingos (Clube Agir)	Geovanna Santos (Clube Ítalo Brasileiro)	Maria Eduarda Alexandre (AGITO/PR)

==== Hoop ====
Games	Gold	Silver	Bronze
1971-2010	Unknown	Unknown	Unknown
2011 Guarulhos			
2012 Goiânia			
2013 Vitória			
2014 Vitória	Natália Gaudio (Escola de Campeãs)	Emanuelle Lima (Clube Ítalo Brasileiro)	Stephany Gonçalves (Grêmio Náutico União)
2015 Vitória	Natália Gaudio (Escola de Campeãs)	Angélica Kvieczynski (AER Sadia)	Bárbara Domingos (Clube Agir)
2016 Aracaju	Natália Gaudio (Escola de Campeãs)	Bárbara Domingos (Clube Agir)	Karine Walter (AER Sadia)
2017 Vitória	Natália Gaudio (Escola de Campeãs	Bárbara Domingos (Clube Agir)	Karine Walter (AER Sadia)
2018 Curitiba	Bárbara Domingos (Clube Agir)	Natália Gaudio (Escola de Campeãs)	Mariany Miyamoto (AGRDJ)
2019 Rio de Janeiro	Natália Gaudio (Escola de Campeãs)	Bárbara Domingos (Clube Agir)	Geovanna Santos (Clube Ítalo Brasileiro)
2021 Aracaju	Bárbara Domingos (Clube Agir)	Ana Luísa Neiva (CASSAB)	Nicole Herkenhoff (Clube Agir)
2022 São Caetano do Sul	Ana Luísa Neiva (CASSAB)	Geovanna Santos (Clube Ítalo Brasileiro)	Bárbara Domingos (Clube Agir)
2023 Campo Grande	Maria Eduarda Alexandre (AGITO/PR)	Geovanna Santos (INCESP/ES)	Emanuelle Rocha (EC/ES)
2024 Lauro de Freitas	Maria Eduarda Alexandre (AGITO/PR)	Geovanna Santos (Clube Ítalo Brasileiro)	Ana Luísa Neiva
2025 Rio de Janeiro			
2026 Natal	Geovanna Santos (Clube Ítalo Brasileiro)	Bárbara Domingos (Clube Agir)	Samara Sibin

==== Ball ====
Games	Gold	Silver	Bronze
1971-2010	Unknown	Unknown	Unknown
2011 Guarulhos			
2012 Goiânia			
2013 Vitória			
2014 Vitória	Natália Gaudio (Escola de Campeãs)	Stephany Gonçalves (Grêmio Náutico União)	Andressa Jardim (Grêmio Náutico União); Emanuelle Lima (Clube Ítalo Brasileiro)
2015 Vitória	Angélica Kvieczynski (AER Sadia)	Natália Gaudio (Escola de Campeãs)	Mayra Siñeriz (Clube Ítalo Brasileiro)
2016 Aracaju	Natália Gaudio (Escola de Campeãs)	Bárbara Domingos (Clube Agir)	Carolina Garcia (Escola de Campeãs)
2017 Vitória	Bárbara Domingos (Clube Agir)	Karine Walter (AER Sadia)	Mariany Miyamoto (AGRDJ)
2018 Curitiba	Natália Gaudio (Escola de Campeãs)	Bárbara Domingos (Clube Agir)	Heloisa Bornal (ADR Unopar)
2019 Rio de Janeiro	Natália Gaudio (Escola de Campeãs)	Bárbara Domingos (Clube Agir)	Heloisa Bornal (ADR Unopar)
2021 Aracaju	Bárbara Domingos (Clube Agir)	Natália Gaudio (Escola de Campeãs)	Ana Luísa Neiva (CASSAB)
2022 São Caetano do Sul	Bárbara Domingos (Clube Agir)	Ana Luísa Neiva (CASSAB)	Geovanna Santos (Clube Ítalo Brasileiro)
2023 Campo Grande	Geovanna Santos (Clube Ítalo Brasileiro)	Maria Eduarda Alexandre (AGITO/PR)	Isadora Oliveira (AGIR/PR)
2024 Lauro de Freitas	Geovanna Santos (Clube Ítalo Brasileiro)	Maria Eduarda Alexandre (AGITO/PR)	Keila Santos

==== Clubs ====
Games	Gold	Silver	Bronze
1971-2010	Unknown	Unknown	Unknown
2011 Guarulhos			
2012 Goiânia			
2013 Vitória			
2014 Vitória	Emanuelle Lima (Clube Ítalo Brasileiro)	Natália Gaudio (Escola de Campeãs)	Stephany Gonçalves (Grêmio Náutico União)
2015 Vitória	Natália Gaudio (Escola de Campeãs)	Angélica Kvieczynski (AER Sadia)	Mayra Siñeriz (Clube Ítalo Brasileiro)
2016 Aracaju	Natália Gaudio (Escola de Campeãs)	Bárbara Domingos (Clube Agir)	Carolina Garcia (Escola de Campeãs)
2017 Vitória	Natália Gaudio (Escola de Campeãs)	Bárbara Domingos (Clube Agir)	Vitoria Guerra (Grêmio Náutico União)
2018 Curitibs	Natália Gaudio (Escola de Campeãs)	Bárbara Domingos (Clube Agir)	Heloisa Bornal (ADR Unopar)
2019 Rio de Janeiro	Natália Gaudio (Escola de Campeãs)	Bárbara Domingos (Clube Agir)	Geovanna Santos (Clube Ítalo Brasileiro)
2021 Aracaju	Bárbara Domingos (Clube Agir)	Ana Luísa Neiva (CASSAB)	Viviane Miranda (FAE Osasco)
2022 São Caetano do Sul	Geovanna Santos (Clube Ítalo Brasileiro)	Bárbara Domingos (Clube Agir)	Andressa Jardim (Grêmio Náutico União)
2023 Campo Grande	Geovanna Santos (Clube Ítalo Brasileiro)	Maria Eduarda Alexandre (AGITO/PR)	Isadora Oliveira (AGIR/PR)
2024 Lauro de Freitas	Maria Eduarda Alexandre (AGITO/PR)	Geovanna Santos (Clube Ítalo Brasileiro)	Ana Luísa Neiva

==== Ribbon ====
Games	Gold	Silver	Bronze
1971-2010	Unknown	Unknown	Unknown
2011 Guarulhos			
2012 Goiânia			
2013 Vitória			
2014 Vitória	Stephany Gonçalves (Grêmio Náutico União)	Natália Gaudio (Escola de Campeãs)	Emanuelle Lima (Clube Ítalo Brasileiro)
2015 Vitória	Natália Gaudio (Escola de Campeãs)	Angélica Kvieczynski (AER Sadia)	Carolina Garcia (Escola de Campeãs)
2016 Aracaju	Natália Gaudio (Escola de Campeãs)	Bárbara Domingos (Clube Agir)	Carolina Garcia (Escola de Campeãs)
2017 Vitória	Bárbara Domingos (Clube Agir)	Natália Gaudio (Escola de Campeãs)	Mariany Miyamoto (AGRDJ)
2018 Curitiba	Natália Gaudio (Escola de Campeãs)	Bárbara Domingos (Clube Agir)	Heloisa Bornal (ADR Unopar)
2019 Rio de Janeiro	Bárbara Domingos (Clube Agir)	Natália Gaudio (Escola de Campeãs)	Heloisa Bornal (ADR Unopar)
2021 Aracaju	Natália Gaudio (Escola de Campeãs)	Viviane Miranda (FAE Osasco)	Andressa Jardim (Grêmio Náutico União)
2022 São Caetano do Sul	Bárbara Domingos (Clube Agir)	Geovanna Santos (Clube Ítalo Brasileiro)	Ana Luísa Neiva (CASSAB)
2023 Campo Grande	Geovanna Santos (Clube Ítalo Brasileiro)	Samara Sibin (AGITO)	Emanuelle Rocha (EC/ES)
2024 Lauro de Freitas	Geovanna Santos (Clube Ítalo Brasileiro)	Ana Luísa Neiva	Samara Sibin

=== Groups ===
==== All-Around ====
Games	Gold	Silver	Bronze
1971-2010	Unknown	Unknown	Unknown
2011 Belém	Clube dos Oficiais	Adiee/Udesc	Escola de Campeãs
2012 Manaus			
2013 Palmas			
2014 Manaus	Clube dos Oficiais		
2015 Vitória	Escola de Campeãs		
2016 Florianópolis	AER Sadia	Clube Agir	Adiee/Udesc
2017 Florianópolis	Escola de Campeãs	Adiee/Udesc	AER Sadia
2018 Aracaju	Escola de Campeãs	AER Sadia	Adiee/Udesc
2019 Londrina	SERC Santa Maria	AGIBLU	Grêmio Náutico União
2021 Florianópolis	Clube Ítalo Brasileiro	ADR Unopar	AGIBLU
2022 Florianópolis	Adiee/Udesc	AGIBLU	Grêmio Náutico União
2023 Curitiba			
2024			

==== Single Apparatus ====
Games	Gold	Silver	Bronze
1971-2010	Unknown	Unknown	Unknown
2011 Belém	Clube Agir	Clube dos Oficiais	Adiee/Udesc
2012 Manaus			
2013 Palmas			
2014 Manaus	Clube dos Oficiais		
2015 Vitória	AER Sadia		
2016 Florianópolis	ADR Unopar	Clube Agir	SERC Santa Maria
2017 Florianópolis	AER Sadia	Escola de Campeãs	Adiee/Udesc
2018 Aracaju	AER Sadia	Clube Ítalo Brasileiro	Adiee/Udesc
2019 Londrina	SERC Santa Maria	AGIBLU	ADR Unopar
2021 Florianópolis	Adiee/Udesc	Clube Ítalo Brasileiro	ADR Unopar
2022 Florianópolis	Grêmio Náutico União	Adiee/Udesc	Escola de Campeãs
2023 Curitiba			
2024			

==== Mixed Apparatus ====
Games	Gold	Silver	Bronze
1971-2010	Unknown	Unknown	Unknown
2011 Belém	Clube Agir	Clube dos Oficiais	Adiee/Udesc
2012 Manaus			
2013 Palmas			
2014 Manaus	Clube dos Oficiais		
2015 Virória	AER Sadia		
2016 Florianópolis	Adiee/Udesc	ADR Unopar	Associação Ginástica Rítmica Colibri
2017 Florianópolis	Escola de Campeãs	AER Sadia	P.M. São José dos Campos
2018 Aracaju	AER Sadia	Escola de Campeãs	Clube Ítalo Brasileiro
2019 Londrina	SERC Santa Maria	AGIBLU	Adiee/Udesc
2021 Florianópolis	Clube Ítalo Brasileiro	AGIBLU	Adiee/Udesc
2022 Florianópolis	Escola de Campeãs	AGIBLU	SESI Taguatinga
2023 Curitiba			
2024			
