= Canada at the Pan American Games =

- IOC code: CAN
- NOC: Canadian Olympic Committee
- Medals Ranked 3rd: Gold 536 Silver 775 Bronze 920 Total 2,231

Pan American Games appearances (overview)
- 1955; 1959; 1963; 1967; 1971; 1975; 1979; 1983; 1987; 1991; 1995; 1999; 2003; 2007; 2011; 2015; 2019; 2023

Canada has competed at every edition of the Pan American Games since the second edition of the multi-sport event in 1955. As of the last Pan American Games in 2019, Canada is third on the all time medals list, only behind the United States and Cuba. Canada is also one of nine countries to have competed at the only Winter Pan American Games, and only of one two (the other being the United States) to win a medal at the games.

== Hosted Games ==
Canada has hosted the Pan American Games on three occasions:

Games	Host city	Dates
1967 Pan American Games	Winnipeg	July 23 – August 6
1999 Pan American Games	Winnipeg	July 23 – August 8
2015 Pan American Games	Toronto	July 10 – July 26

== Pan American Games ==
=== Medals by games ===
^{1}	Hosting edition

To sort the tables by host city, total medal count, or any other column, click on the icon next to the column title.

Year	Ref.	Edition	Host city	# of athletes	Rank	Gold	Silver	Bronze	Total
1951		I	(Argentina) Buenos Aires		Did not participate				
1955		II	Mexico City	24	5th	4	4	3	11
1959 ^{a}		III	(United States) Chicago	177	5th	7	21	28	46
1963 ^{b}		IV	(Brazil) São Paulo	134	3rd	10	27	25	62
1967 ^{c}		V	(Canada) Winnipeg ^{1}	438	2nd	12	37	43	92
1971 ^{d}		VI	(Colombia) Cali	319	3rd	19	20	42	81
1975 ^{e}		VII	Mexico City	343	3rd	18	35	38	91
1979 ^{f}		VIII	(Puerto Rico) San Juan	451	3rd	24	43	70	137
1983 ^{g}		IX	(Venezuela) Caracas	376	3rd	22	41	55	118
1987 ^{h}		X	(United States) Indianapolis	469	3rd	30	57	75	162
1991		XI	(Cuba) Havana	457	3rd	22	46	59	127
1995		XII	(Argentina) Mar del Plata	470	3rd	47	61	69	177
1999		XIII	(Canada) Winnipeg ^{1}	618	3rd	64	52	81	197
2003 ^{i}		XIV	(Dominican Republic) Santo Domingo	421	3rd	29	57	42	128
2007		XV	(Brazil) Rio de Janeiro	468	4th	39	44	55	138
2011		XVI	(Mexico) Guadalajara	492	5th	30	40	49	119
2015		XVII	(Canada) Toronto ^{1}	723	2nd	78	70	71	219
2019		XVIII	(Peru) Lima	477	4th	35	65	52	152
2023		XIX	(Chile) Santiago	469	4th	46	55	63	164
Total ^{j}					3rd	536	775	920	2,231

Notes

- ^a Some sources appoint 7 gold medals, 21 silver medals and 28 bronze medals, instead of 5, 19 and 24, respectively. This would result in a total of 56 medals earned during the 1959 Games, instead of 48.
- ^b Some sources appoint 10 gold medals and 25 bronze medals, instead of 11 and 26, respectively. This would result in a total of 62 medals earned during the 1963 Games, instead of 64.
- ^c Some sources appoint 12 gold medals, 37 silver medals and 43 bronze medals, instead of 17, 39 and 50, respectively. This would result in a total of 92 medals earned during the 1967 Games, instead of 106.
- ^d Some sources appoint 42 bronze medals, instead of 41. This would result in a total of 81 medals earned during the 1971 Games, instead of 80.
- ^e Some sources appoint 18 gold medals and 38 bronze medals, instead of 19 and 40, respectively. This would result in a total of 94 medals earned during the 1975 Games, instead of 91.
- ^f Some sources appoint 70 bronze medals, instead of 71. This would result in a total of 137 medals earned during the 1979 Games, instead of 138.
- ^g Some sources appoint 22 gold medals, 42 silver medals and 55 bronze medals, instead of 18, 44 and 47, respectively. This would result in a total of 119 medals earned during the 1983 Games, instead of 109.
- ^h Some sources appoint 57 silver medals, instead of 56. This would result in a total of 162 medals earned during the 1987 Games, instead of 161.
- ^i Some sources appoint 41 bronze medals, instead of 42. This would result in a total of 127 medals earned during the 2003 Games, instead of 128.
- ^j According to those sources, the historical medal table for Canada counts 455 gold medals, 655 silver medals and 802 bronze medals, instead of 456, 656 and 801, respectively. This would result in a total number of 1912 Pan American medals.

=== Medals by sport ===
Canadians have won medals in most of the current Summer Pan American sports. The exceptions are 3x3 basketball, basque pelota and BMX freestyle cycling.

As of the conclusion of the 2019 Pan American Games

Leading in that sport

Sport	Gold	Silver	Bronze	Total
Athletics	55	71	88	214
Swimming	53	122	144	319
Gymnastics	37	50	57	144
Rowing	33	39	30	102
Cycling	33	16	19	68
Canoeing	26	33	26	85
Shooting	23	43	59	125
Diving	23	19	22	64
Badminton	21	22	12	55
Equestrian	20	22	14	56
Water skiing	19	26	11	56
Weightlifting	18	21	40	79
Wrestling	15	37	66	118
Judo	15	24	45	84
Squash	14	14	13	41
Artistic swimming	11	21	4	36
Sailing	11	19	20	50
Softball	10	6	1	17
Table tennis	8	8	24	40
Fencing	6	19	39	64
Boxing	6	13	28	47
Taekwondo	5	10	16	31
Archery	4	10	14	28
Field hockey	4	10	5	19
Bowling	4	3	6	13
Rugby	4	1	0	5
Karate	2	6	10	18
Triathlon	2	5	5	12
Baseball	2	2	1	5
Water polo	1	7	6	14
Tennis	1	3	2	6
Basketball	1	2	3	6
Football	1	1	1	3
Beach volleyball	1	0	0	1
Sambo	1	0	0	1
Racquetball	0	8	10	18
Handball	0	3	0	3
Roller sports	0	2	8	10
Modern pentathlon	0	2	2	4
Volleyball	0	0	4	4
Golf	0	0	1	1
Surfing	0	0	1	1
Totals (42 entries)	490	720	857	2,067

Best results in non-medaling sports:

Summer
Sport	Rank	Athlete	Event and year
3x3 basketball	Did not participate		
Basque pelota	Did not participate		
BMX freestyle	7th	Jaden Chipman	Men's park in 2019

=== Flag bearers ===
==== Opening ceremonies ====
Flag bearers carry the national flag of their country at the opening ceremony of the Pan American Games.

#	Event year	Flag bearer	Sport	References
19	2023	Melissa Humana-Paredes; Brandie Wilkerson	Beach volleyball	
18	2019	Scott Tupper	Field hockey	
17	2015	Mark Oldershaw	Canoeing	
16	2011	Christine Sinclair	Football (soccer)	
15	2007	Susan Nattrass	Shooting	
14	2003	Jaret Llewellyn	Water skiing	
13	1999	Tanya Dubnicoff	Cycling	
12	1995	Paul Chohan	Field hockey	
11	1991	Lorraine Stubbs	Equestrian (Dressage)	
10	1987	Nancy Charlton	Field hockey	
9	1983	Brad Farrow	Judo	
8	1979	Sylvia Sweeney	Basketball	
7	1975			
6	1971	Henri Corbeil	Baseball	
5	1967	George Puce	Athletics (track and field)	
4	1963			
3	1959			
2	1955			

== Winter Pan American Games ==
=== Medals by games ===
Year	Ref.	Edition	Host city	Rank	Gold	Silver	Bronze	Total
1990		I	(Argentina) Las Leñas	2nd	2	4	1	7
Total				2nd	2	4	1	7

=== Medals by sport ===
Leading in that sport

Sport	Gold	Silver	Bronze	Total
Alpine skiing	2	4	1	7
Totals (1 entries)	2	4	1	7

== Junior Pan American Games ==
=== Medals by games ===
Year	Ref.	Edition	Host city	Athletes	Rank	Gold	Silver	Bronze	Total
2021		I	(Colombia) Cali-Valle	31	14th	4	1	5	10
2025		II	(Paraguay) Asunción	157	6th	19	22	22	63
Total					—N/a	23	23	27	73

=== Medals by sport ===
Leading in that sport

Sport	Gold	Silver	Bronze	Total
Athletics	7	7	1	15
Badminton	5	1	0	6
Gymnastics	2	4	3	9
Diving	2	1	2	5
Water skiing	2	0	3	5
Karate	2	0	0	2
Taekwondo	1	0	1	2
Basketball	1	0	0	1
Weightlifting	1	0	0	1
Canoeing	0	2	1	3
Triathlon	0	2	0	2
Table tennis	0	1	5	6
Judo	0	1	3	4
Rowing	0	1	3	4
Archery	0	1	1	2
Artistic swimming	0	1	0	1
Field hockey	0	1	0	1
Rugby sevens	0	0	1	1
Sailing	0	0	1	1
Squash	0	0	1	1
Wrestling	0	0	1	1
Totals (21 entries)	23	23	27	73

=== Medallists ===
Medal	Name	Sport	Event	Year
Gold	Brian Yang; Rachel Chan	Badminton	Mixed doubles	2021
Gold	Rachel Chan	Badminton	Women's singles	2021
Gold	Brian Yang	Badminton	Men's singles	2021
Gold	Yamina Lahyanssa	Karate	Women's 50 kg	2021
Gold	Rielle Bonne; Mélina Corriveau	Gymnastics	Women's synchronized trampoline	2025
Gold	Rachel Chan	Badminton	Women's singles	2025
Gold	Victor Lai	Badminton	Men's singles	2025
Gold	Gabrielle Beaulieu	Taekwondo	Women's 67 kg	2025
Gold	Marah Dykstra; Gage Grassick; Mackenzie Smith; Jade Belmore	3x3 Basketball	Women's tournament	2025
Gold	Jadyn Keeler	Athletics	Women's 10,000 metres	2025
Gold	Katelyn Fung; Kate Miller	Diving	Women's synchronized 10 metre platform	2025
Gold	Matt Cullen; Benjamin Tessier	Diving	Men's synchronized 10 metre platform	2025
Gold	Charles Ross	Water skiing	Men's slalom	2025
Gold	Kate Pinsonneault	Water skiing	Women's jump	2025
Gold	Jennifer Elizarov	Athletics	Women's pole vault	2025
Gold	Dianna Proctor	Athletics	Women's 400 metres	2025
Gold	Izzy Goudros	Athletics	Women's heptathlon	2025
Gold	Thomas Tittley	Gymnastics	Men's floor exercise	2025
Gold	Jude Wheeler-Dee	Athletics	Men's 1,500 metres	2025
Gold	Charlotte Simoneau	Weightlifting	Women's 69 kg	2025
Gold	Maria Ouyahia	Karate	Women's 55 kg	2025
Gold	Praise Aniamaka	Athletics	Men's triple jump	2025
Gold	Izzy Goudros; Emily Martin; Avery Pearson; Dianna Proctor	Athletics	Women's 4 × 400 metres relay	2025
Silver	Aurélie Tran	Gymnastics	Women's uneven bars	2021
Silver	Arthur Karpukov	Judo	Men's 81 kg	2025
Silver	Janna Hawash	Rowing	Women's eight	2025
Silver	Janna Hawash	Archery	Women's individual recurve	2025
Silver	Étienne Cloutier; Cody Cyman	Gymnastics	Men's synchronized trampoline	2025
Silver	Victor Lai; Rachel Chan	Badminton	Mixed doubles	2025
Silver	Benjamin Tessier	Diving	Men's 10 metre platform	2025
Silver	Brooklyn Aranha; Parmveer Basra; Gurwinder Brar; Josiah Campbell; Christopher Chalut; Navdip Chandi; Leighton De Souza; Satpreet Dhadda; Caleb Fitch; Morgan Garside; Ravpreet Gill; Kirin Robinson; Sawyer Ross; Harjas Sanghera; Kale Simonson; Grant Simpson	Field hockey	Men's tournament	2025
Silver	Natalie Chan	Table tennis	Women's singles	2025
Silver	Avery Pearson	Athletics	Women's 800 metres	2025
Silver	Elizabeth Desrosiers-McArthur	Canoeing	Women's C-1 200 metres	2025
Silver	Sidney Clement	Triathlon	Women's individual	2025
Silver	Jeremiah Nubbe	Athletics	Men's hammer throw	2025
Silver	Heather Abadie	Athletics	Women's pole vault	2025
Silver	Jadyn Keeler	Athletics	Women's 5,000 metres	2025
Silver	Émile Toupin	Athletics	Men's 1,500 metres	2025
Silver	Liv Sands	Athletics	Women's shot put	2025
Silver	Thomas Tittley	Gymnastics	Men's horizontal bars	2025
Silver	Stella Letendre	Gymnastics	Women's floor exercise	2025
Silver	Sidney Clement; Daniel Epp; Molly Lakustiak; Blake Harris	Triathlon	Mixed relay	2025
Silver	Charlie Breault; Olena Verbinska	Artistic swimming	Women's duet	2025
Silver	John O'Reilly	Athletics	Men's 800 metres	2025
Silver	Jérémy Lantz; Brianna Smith	Canoeing	Mixed K-2 500 metres	2025
Bronze	Nicholas Hoefling	Taekwondo	Men's 58 kg	2021
Bronze	Aurélie Tran	Gymnastics	Women's artistic individual all-around	2021
Bronze	Hannah Blatt; Sydney Maxwell; Iman Shaheen	Squash	Women's team	2021
Bronze	Jeremy Hazin; Sophie Gauthier	Table tennis	Mixed doubles	2021
Bronze	Jeremy Hazin	Table tennis	Men's singles	2021
Bronze	Alessandra Tuttle; Ella McKinley; Riley Richardson; Firinne Rolfe	Rowing	Women's coxless four	2025
Bronze	Carla van Zyl	Judo	Women's 57 kg	2025
Bronze	Charlie Thibault	Judo	Women's 70 kg	2025
Bronze	Ella McKinley; Riley Richardson	Rowing	Women's coxless pair	2025
Bronze	Jalyn Mowry; Tess Friar	Rowing	Women's double sculls	2025
Bronze	Janna Hawash; Kylie Oliver	Archery	Women's team recurve	2025
Bronze	John Jr Messé A Bessong	Judo	Men's +100 kg	2025
Bronze	Katelyn Fung	Diving	Women's 10 metre platform	2025
Bronze	Bomi Lawal; Kiki Idowu; Sarah Schonfeld; Olivia Newsome; Adia Pye; Zina Umeh; Ivy Poetker; Kennedi Stevenson; Adelaide Holmes; Charlotte Hilton; Elle Douglas; Kelsa Kempf	Rugby sevens	Women's tournament	2025
Bronze	James Huynh	Sailing	Men's kite	2025
Bronze	Natalie Chan; Jessie Xu	Table tennis	Women's doubles	2025
Bronze	Kenny Ly; Laurent Jutras	Table tennis	Men's doubles	2025
Bronze	Jessie Xu	Table tennis	Women's singles	2025
Bronze	Carson Paul	Diving	Men's 3 metre springboard	2025
Bronze	Jérémy Lantz	Canoeing	Men's K-1 1000 metres	2025
Bronze	Hannah Stopnicki	Water skiing	Women's tricks	2025
Bronze	Jacob Chambers	Water skiing	Men's jump	2025
Bronze	Coralie Demers; Maryam Saber; Samantha Couture; Stella Letendre	Gymnastics	Women's artistic team	2025
Bronze	Jacob Chambers	Water skiing	Men's overall	2025
Bronze	Coralie Demers	Gymnastics	Women's vault	2025
Bronze	Mia Friesen	Wrestling	Women's freestyle 57 kg	2025
Bronze	Tricia Madourie	Athletics	Women's high jump	2025

=== Flag bearers ===
==== Opening ceremonies ====
Flag bearers carry the national flag of their country at the opening ceremony of the Junior Pan American Games.

#	Event year	Flag bearer	Sport	References
1	2021	Brian Yang	Badminton	
1	2021	Aurélie Tran	Gymnastics	
2	2025	Victor Lai	Badminton	
2	2025	Rielle Bonne	Gymnastics	

==== Closing ceremonies ====
Flag bearers carry the national flag of their country at the closing ceremony of the Junior Pan American Games.

#	Event year	Flag bearer	Sport	Reference
1	2021	Remi Aubin	Gymnastics	
1	2021	Yamina Lahyanssa	Karate	
2	2025	Thomas Tittley	Gymnastics	
2	2025	Charlotte Simoneau	Weightlifting	
