= Grassick =

Grassick is a surname of Scottish origin derived from the occupation of shoemaker. Notable people with the surname include:

- Chris Grassick (born 1990), Scottish field hockey player
- Gage Grassick (born 2002), Canadian basketball player
- James Grassick (1868–1956), Canadian businessman and politician
