= Mazzuchelli =

Mazzuchelli or Mazzucchelli is a surname. Notable people with the surname include:

== Mazzuchelli ==
- Samuel Mazzuchelli (1806–1864), Italian Catholic missionary

== Mazzucchelli ==
- David Mazzucchelli (born 1960), American comic book artist and illustrator
- Giammaria Mazzucchelli (1707–1765), Italian writer, bibliographer and literary historian
- Pier Francesco Mazzucchelli (1573–1626), Italian painter and draughtsman
- Santino Mazzucchelli (born 2004), Argentine basketball player
- Ugo Mazzucchelli (1903–1997), Italian anarchist, anti-fascist and wartime partisan leader
