= Squash at the 2023 Pan American Games – Qualification =

The following are the qualification system and qualified countries for the Squash at the 2023 Pan American Games competition in Santiago, Chile.

== Qualification system ==
A total of 50 squash athletes (25 men and 25 women) will qualify to compete. Each nation may enter a maximum of 6 athletes (three per gender), except for the NOCs that have qualified in Cali 2021. The host nation, Chile automatically qualified the maximum team size. Other seven men's and women's teams (of three athletes) will qualify through different qualification tournaments.

== Qualification timeline ==
| Event | Date | Venue |
|---|---|---|
| 2021 Junior Pan American Games | November 26 – December 1, 2021 | (Colombia) Cali |
| 2022 South American Games | October 1–15, 2022 | (Paraguay) Asunción |
| 2023 Pan American Squash Championships | 29 May – 4 June | (Colombia) Cartagena |

== Qualification summary ==
A total of ten countries qualified athletes.

| Nation | Men | | | Women | | | Mixed | Total |
| Nation | Individual | Doubles | Team | Individual | Doubles | Team | Doubles | Athletes |
|---|---|---|---|---|---|---|---|---|
| Argentina | 2 | 1 | X | | | | | 3 |
| Barbados | | | | 2 | 1 | X | | 3 |
| Canada | 2 | 1 | X | 2 | 1 | X | 1 | 6 |
| Chile | 2 | 1 | X | 2 | 1 | X | 1 | 6 |
| Colombia | 2 | 1 | X | 2 | 1 | X | 1 | 6 |
| Ecuador | | | | 2 | 1 | X | | 3 |
| Guatemala | 2 | 1 | X | 2 | 1 | X | 1 | 6 |
| Mexico | 3 | 1 | X | 2 | 1 | X | 1 | 7 |
| Peru | 2 | 1 | X | | | | | 3 |
| United States | 2 | 1 | X | 3 | 1 | X | 1 | 7 |
| Total: 10 NOCs | 17 | 8 | 8 | 17 | 8 | 8 | 6 | 50 |

== Men ==
| Event | Criterion | Qualified | Athletes per NOC | Total |
|---|---|---|---|---|
| Host nation | —N/a | Chile | 3 | 3 |
| 2021 Junior Pan American Games | Gold medalist | Mexico | 1 | 1 |
| 2022 South American Games | Gold medalists | Argentina | 3 | 3 |
| 2023 Pan American Squash Championships | Top 6 not qualified | Colombia; Peru; United States; Mexico; Canada; Guatemala | 3 | 18 |
| TOTAL | | | | 25 |

== Women ==
| Event | Criterion | Qualified | Athletes per NOC | Total |
|---|---|---|---|---|
| Host nation | —N/a | Chile | 3 | 3 |
| 2021 Junior Pan American Games | Gold medalist | United States | 1 | 1 |
| 2022 South American Games | Gold medalists | Colombia | 3 | 3 |
| 2023 Pan American Squash Championships | Top 6 not qualified | United States; Canada; Barbados; Mexico; Ecuador; Guatemala | 3 | 18 |
| TOTAL | | | | 25 |
