= Thomas Mejía =

Colombian gymnast

- Full name: Thomás Edén Mejía Cartagena
- Born: 13 July 2008 (age 18) Envigado, Colombia

Gymnastics career
- Discipline: Men's artistic gymnastics
- Country represented: Colombia; (2024–present)
- Gym: Jorge Hugo Giraldo Coliseum
- Head coach: Leonardo González
Medal record
Representing Colombia
Men's artistic gymnastics
Pan American Championships
Silver medal – second place	2026 Rio de Janeiro	Team
Central American and Caribbean Games
Gold medal – first place	2026 Santo Domingo	Team
South American Games
Gold medal – first place	2026 Santa Fe	All-around
Gold medal – first place	2026 Santa Fe	Floor exercise
Silver medal – second place	2026 Santa Fe	Team
Silver medal – second place	2026 Santa Fe	Pommel horse

Thomás Edén Mejía Cartagena (born July 13, 2008) is a Colombian artistic gymnast. He is the 2026 South American Games all-around and floor exercise champion and the 2025 Junior Pan American Games champion.

== Early life ==
Mejía was born in Envigado, Antioquia, Colombia in 2008. When he was five years old, his parents showed him videos of different sports so he could learn about them and be encouraged to try one. He was inspired to go into gymnastics after watching Jorge Hugo Giraldo.

== Gymnastics career ==
=== 2025 ===
Mejía competed at the 2025 Junior Pan American Games where he helped Colombia win silver as a team behind the United States. Individually he won gold in the all-around and bronze on floor exercise.

Mejía competed at the 2025 Junior World Championships alongside Camilo Vera and Jorman Álvarez. Together they finished twelfth as a team. Individually Mejía qualified to the parallel bars final where he ultimately finished eighth.

=== 2026 ===
Mejía became age-eligible for senior level competition in 2026. At the 2026 Pan American Championships, he helped Colombia win silver behind Canada. Mejía competed at the 2026 Central American and Caribbean Games where he helped Colombia win gold as a team. At the 2026 South American Games, Mejía helped Colombia win silver as a team. Individually he won gold in the all-around and on floor exercise and won silver on pommel horse.

At the 2026 World Championships, Mejía helped Colombia qualify for their first team final in history where they ultimately finished eighth.

== Competitive history ==
Competitive history of Thomas Mejía at the junior level
Year	Event	Team	AA	FX	PH	SR	VT	PB	HB
2023	Colombian Championships		2nd place, silver medalist(s)						
2023	2nd Colombian Championships		2nd place, silver medalist(s)						
2024	Bolivarian Youth Games								3rd place, bronze medalist(s)
2024	Pacific Rim Championships	3rd place, bronze medalist(s)	4	5	6	8		5	
2024	Colombian Championships		3rd place, bronze medalist(s)						
2024	Junior Pan American Championships	2nd place, silver medalist(s)	5	3rd place, bronze medalist(s)		5			2nd place, silver medalist(s)
2025
2025	Junior Pan American Games	2nd place, silver medalist(s)	1st place, gold medalist(s)	3rd place, bronze medalist(s)	4				8
2025	South American Junior Championships	1st place, gold medalist(s)	2nd place, silver medalist(s)						
2025	Junior World Championships	12						8	

Competitive history of Thomas Mejía at the senior level
Year	Event	Team	AA	FX	PH	SR	VT	PB	HB
2026	Colombian Championships		1st place, gold medalist(s)	4			3rd place, bronze medalist(s)	1st place, gold medalist(s)	5
2026	Pan American Championships	2nd place, silver medalist(s)							
2026	Central American and Caribbean Games	1st place, gold medalist(s)		7					
2026	South American Games	2nd place, silver medalist(s)	1st place, gold medalist(s)	1st place, gold medalist(s)	2nd place, silver medalist(s)			4	4
2026	World Championships	8							
