= Miguel Pujol =

Argentinian squash player

Personal information
- Born: 22 September 1999 (age 26) São Paulo, Brazil

Sport
- Country: Argentina
- Turned pro: 2021
- Retired: Active

Men's singles
- Highest ranking: No. 380 (August 2025)
- Current ranking: No. 380 (August 2025)
Medal record
Representing Argentina
Men's squash
Junior Pan American Games
Bronze medal – third place	2021 Cali-Valle	Singles
Bronze medal – third place	2021 Cali-Valle	Doubles
Bronze medal – third place	2021 Cali-Valle	Team

Miguel Pujol (born 22 September 1999) is an Argentinian professional squash player. He reached a career high ranking of 380 in the world during August 2025.

== Career ==
Pujol won the 2021 Head Open. In 2024, Pujol won his 2nd PSA title after securing victory in the II PSA AnyósPark and in July 2025, he won his 3rd PSA title after securing victory in the Bio Por Cento Open during the 2024–25 PSA Squash Tour.
