= Ana Luisa Abraham =

Mexican rhythmic gymnast (born 2010)

- Full name: Ana Luisa Abraham Habib
- Born: 1 December 2010 (age 15) Mérida, Yucatán

Gymnastics career
- Discipline: Rhythmic gymnastics
- Country represented: Mexico; (2024–)
Medal record
Representing Mexico
Rhythmic gymnastics
Pan American Championships
Bronze medal – third place	2026 Rio de Janeiro	Team
Central American and Caribbean Games
Gold medal – first place	2026 Santo Domingo	Team
Gold medal – first place	2026 Santo Domingo	Hoop
Silver medal – second place	2026 Santo Domingo	All-Around
Silver medal – second place	2026 Santo Domingo	Clubs
Junior Pan American Championships
Silver medal – second place	2024 Guatemala City	Hoop
Silver medal – second place	2025 Asunción	Team
Silver medal – second place	2025 Asunción	Ball
Bronze medal – third place	2025 Asunción	All-Around
Bronze medal – third place	2025 Asunción	Hoop
Bronze medal – third place	2025 Asunción	Clubs
Junior Pan American Games
Gold medal – first place	2025 Asunción	Ball

Ana Luisa Abraham Habib (born 1 December 2010) is a Mexican individual rhythmic gymnast. She represents Mexico in international competitions.

== Career ==
=== Junior ===
Abraham became a junior in 2024 and debuted at the Portimão International Tournament, where she won gold in the all-around, silver with ball and bronze with ribbon. In June, she competed at the Pan American Championships in Guatemala City, where she was 4th in teams (along with teammates Constanza Galindo, Sarah Dueñas and Eva Arevalo), 7th in the all-around, and 6th with ball. In the hoop final, she won silver.

In May 2025, she took part in the Pan American Championships, winning bronze in the all-around, with hoop and with clubs as well as silver with ball. She also won silver in teams, along with her teammates Marijose Delgado and Mariann Estrada. In June, she was selected for the 3rd Junior World Championships in Sofia, where she was 36th with ball, 24th with clubs and 17th in teams (along with Marijose Delgado and the national junior group). In August, she participated in the Junior Pan American Games in Asunción, winning gold with ball in front of Natalie de la Rosa and Sarah Mourão.

=== Senior ===
Abraham became age eligible for senior competitions in 2026. She debuted at the World Cup in Baku, being 40th overall. In June she competed at the Pan American Championships in Rio de Janeiro and took bronze medal in team competition alongside Marina Malpica.
