= Gymnastics at the 2025 Junior Pan American Games =

- Gymnastics pictograms
- Venue: Gymnastics Pavilion
- Dates: August 11, 2025 – August 12, 2025 (trampoline); August 11, 2025 – August 13, 2025 (rhythmic); August 18, 2025 – August 22, 2025 (artistic)

Gymnastics competitions at the 2025 Junior Pan American Games were contested at the Gymnastics Pavilion of the SND Complex in Asunción, Paraguay. Trampoline gymnastics took place on August 11–12; rhythmic gymnastics took place on August 11–13 and artistic gymnastics took place on August 18–22.

== Medal summary ==
=== Medal table ===
| Rank | Nation | Gold | Silver | Bronze | Total |
|---|---|---|---|---|---|
| 1 | United States | 14 | 8 | 9 | 31 |
| 2 | Colombia | 5 | 2 | 2 | 9 |
| 3 | Mexico | 4 | 2 | 6 | 12 |
| 4 | Brazil | 2 | 5 | 7 | 14 |
| 5 | Canada | 2 | 3 | 2 | 7 |
| 6 | Argentina | 0 | 2 | 1 | 3 |
| 7 | Chile | 0 | 2 | 0 | 2 |
| 8 | Puerto Rico | 0 | 1 | 1 | 2 |
| Totals (8 entries) | | 27 | 25 | 28 | 80 |

== Medalists ==
=== Artistic gymnastics ===
==== Men's events ====
| Event | Gold | Silver | Bronze |
|---|---|---|---|
| Team all-around | United States; Dominick Camarena; Jason Hao; William McCrea; Nixon Miles | Colombia; Jorman Álvarez; Thomas Mejía; Matías Ramos; Camilo Vera | Mexico; Juan Pablo Dueñas; Aaron Ibarra; Gael Rosales; Lorenzo Zaragoza |
| Individual all-around | Thomas Mejía; Colombia | Pedro Henrique Silvestre; Brazil | Jason Hao; United States |
| Floor exercise | Thomas Tittley; Canada | Arturo Rossel; Chile | Thomas Mejía; Colombia |
| Pommel horse | Pedro Henrique Silvestre; Brazil | Matías Martínez; Chile | Jason Hao; United States |
| Rings | Lorenzo Zaragoza; Mexico | Jensuel Soto Rodriguez; Puerto Rico | Nixon Miles; United States |
| Vault | Camilo Vera; Colombia | William McCrea; United States | Jensuel Soto Rodriguez; Puerto Rico |
| Parallel bars | Jorman Álvarez; Colombia Camilo Vera; Colombia | None awarded | Aaron Ibarra; Mexico |
| Horizontal bar | Camilo Vera; Colombia | Thomas Tittley; Canada | Pedro Henrique Silvestre; Brazil |

==== Women's events ====
| Event | Gold | Silver | Bronze |
|---|---|---|---|
| Team all-around | United States; Charleigh Bullock; Lavi Crain; Kylie Smith; Addalye VanGrinsven | Brazil; Isabel Aguilar; Kauany Aquino; Sophia Carvalho; Francine Oliveira | Canada; Samantha Couture; Coralie Demers; Stella Letendre; Maryam Saber |
| Individual all-around | Charleigh Bullock; United States | Julieta Lucas; Argentina | Addalye VanGrinsven; United States |
| Vault | Addalye VanGrinsven; United States | Kauany Aquino; Brazil | Coralie Demers; Canada |
| Uneven bars | Charleigh Bullock; United States | Julieta Lucas; Argentina | Dominica Escartín; Mexico |
| Balance beam | Charleigh Bullock; United States | Addalye VanGrinsven; United States | Isabel Aguilar; Brazil |
| Floor exercise | Charleigh Bullock; United States | Stella Letendre; Canada | Dominica Escartín; Mexico Addalye VanGrinsven; United States |

=== Rhythmic gymnastics ===
==== Individual ====
| Event | Gold | Silver | Bronze |
|---|---|---|---|
| Individual all-around | Natalie de la Rosa; United States | Anna Filipp; United States | Sarah Mourão; Brazil |
| Hoop | Natalie de la Rosa; United States | Anna Filipp; United States | Marijose Delgado; Mexico |
| Ball | Ana Luisa Abraham; Mexico | Natalie de la Rosa; United States | Sarah Mourão; Brazil Anna Filipp; United States |
| Clubs | Anna Filipp; United States | Sarah Mourão; Brazil | Natalie de la Rosa; United States |
| Ribbon | Anna Filipp; United States | Sarah Mourão; Brazil | Natalie de la Rosa; United States |

==== Group ====
| Event | Gold | Silver | Bronze |
|---|---|---|---|
| Group all-around | Mexico; Barbara Ponce; Jaydi Novelo; Ana Carolina Martínez; Martha Coldwell; Fernanda Ramírez | United States; Sasha Kuliyev; Nina Keys; Leyla Kukhmazova; Ziahayana Khan; Alana Hirota | Brazil; Júlia Colere; Maria Luiza Albuquerque; Andriely Cichovicz; Amanda Manente; Alice Neves |
| 5 club pairs | Mexico; Barbara Ponce; Jaydi Novelo; Ana Carolina Martínez; Martha Coldwell; Fernanda Ramírez | United States; Sasha Kuliyev; Nina Keys; Leyla Kukhmazova; Ziahayana Khan; Alana Hirota | Brazil; Júlia Colere; Maria Luiza Albuquerque; Andriely Cichovicz; Amanda Manente; Alice Neves |
| 5 hoops | Brazil; Júlia Colere; Maria Luiza Albuquerque; Andriely Cichovicz; Amanda Manente; Alice Neves | Mexico; Barbara Ponce; Jaydi Novelo; Ana Carolina Martínez; Martha Coldwell; Fernanda Ramírez | United States; Sasha Kuliyev; Nina Keys; Leyla Kukhmazova; Ziahayana Khan; Alana Hirota |

=== Trampoline ===
| Event | Gold | Silver | Bronze |
|---|---|---|---|
| Men's individual | Ryan Maccagnan; United States | Donovan Guevara; Mexico | Manuel Sierra; Colombia |
| Men's synchronized | United States; Taj Gleitsman; Ryan Maccagnan | Canada; Étienne Cloutier; Cody Cyman | Argentina; Tomás Roberti; Tobías Weise |
| Women's individual | Kennedi Roberts; United States | Nicole Castellanos; Colombia | Maria Luiza Marcante; Brazil |
| Women's synchronized | Canada; Rielle Bonne; Mélina Corriveau | United States; Logan McCoy; Kennedi Roberts | Mexico; Verónica Borges; Aixa de León |

== Results ==
=== Artistic gymnastics ===
==== Men's team all-around ====
Final – August 19

| Rank | Team | Floor (gymnastics) | Pommel horse | Rings (gymnastics) | Vault (gymnastics) | Parallel bars | Horizontal bar | Total |
|---|---|---|---|---|---|---|---|---|
| 1st place, gold medalist(s) | United States | 38.000 (1) | 36.650 (1) | 35.600 (2) | 40.350 (1) | 37.300 (2) | 37.100 (2) | 225.000 |
| 1st place, gold medalist(s) | Dominick Camarena | 12.400 | 12.300 | 11.150 | 12.600 | 12.850 | 12.400 | 225.000 |
| 1st place, gold medalist(s) | Jason Hao | 12.850 | 12.450 | 11.750 | 13.250 | 11.950 | 12.500 | 225.000 |
| 1st place, gold medalist(s) | William McCrea | 12.750 | 11.800 | 11.900 | 13.900 | 12.250 | 11.250 | 225.000 |
| 1st place, gold medalist(s) | Nixon Miles | 11.300 | 11.900 | 11.950 | 13.200 | 12.200 | 12.200 | 225.000 |
| 2nd place, silver medalist(s) | Colombia | 37.500 (2) | 35.250 (3) | 36.050 (1) | 38.850 (5) | 39.500 (1) | 37.350 (1) | 224.500 |
| 2nd place, silver medalist(s) | Jorman Álvarez | 12.350 | 11.300 | 11.700 | 12.200 | 13.200 | 11.600 | 224.500 |
| 2nd place, silver medalist(s) | Thomas Mejía | 13.100 | 12.200 | 11.600 | 13.100 | 12.950 | 12.400 | 224.500 |
| 2nd place, silver medalist(s) | Matías Ramos | 12.050 | 11.750 | 10.800 | 12.450 | 9.800 | 11.650 | 224.500 |
| 2nd place, silver medalist(s) | Camilo Vera | 11.100 | 10.650 | 12.750 | 13.300 | 13.350 | 13.300 | 224.500 |
| 3rd place, bronze medalist(s) | Mexico | 37.100 (5) | 35.150 (4) | 35.400 (3) | 39.100 (4) | 37.300 (2) | 35.050 (5) | 219.100 |
| 3rd place, bronze medalist(s) | Juan Pablo Dueñas | 11.550 | 11.900 | 11.100 | 13.250 | 12.350 | 11.450 | 219.100 |
| 3rd place, bronze medalist(s) | Aaron Ibarra | 12.950 | 11.800 | 11.700 | 12.300 | 12.750 | 10.600 | 219.100 |
| 3rd place, bronze medalist(s) | Gael Rosales | 11.700 | 10.200 | 11.350 | 12.400 | 12.200 | 11.350 | 219.100 |
| 3rd place, bronze medalist(s) | Lorenzo Zaragoza | 12.450 | 11.450 | 12.350 | 13.450 | 11.550 | 12.250 | 219.100 |
| 4 | Brazil | 36.400 (6) | 36.050 (2) | 35.100 (4) | 38.650 (6) | 35.500 (4) | 35.350 (4) | 217.050 |
| 4 | Ivan Botelho | 12.300 | 12.000 | 11.800 | 12.550 | 11.350 | 11.700 | 217.050 |
| 4 | Eduardo Belli | 12.000 | 10.550 | 11.400 | 12.350 | 11.650 | 11.250 | 217.050 |
| 4 | Pedro Henrique Silvestre | 12.100 | 12.960 | 11.900 | 13.400 | 12.500 | 12.400 | 217.050 |
| 4 | Caio Pereira | 11.850 | 11.100 | 11.250 | 12.700 | 10.300 | 10.350 | 217.050 |
| 5 | Canada | 37.450 (3) | 34.300 (7) | 33.850 (5) | 39.750 (3) | 34.800 (6) | 36.400 (3) | 216.550 |
| 5 | Aiden Gonzalez | 12.450 | 11.750 | 11.000 | 13.150 | 12.100 | 12.150 | 216.550 |
| 5 | Keita Kuramoto | DNS | DNS | 11.250 | 13.450 | DNS | DNS | 216.550 |
| 5 | Parker Smith | 11.700 | 10.750 | 10.600 | 12.750 | 11.050 | 11.500 | 216.550 |
| 5 | Thomas Tittley | 13.300 | 11.800 | 11.600 | 13.150 | 11.650 | 12.750 | 216.550 |
| 6 | Chile | 37.300 (4) | 34.350 (6) | 33.100 (7) | 39.850 (2) | 34.100 (7) | 34.200 (6) | 212.900 |
| 6 | Agustín Espinoza | 12.700 | 10.100 | 11.350 | 13.600 | 11.300 | 11.650 | 212.900 |
| 6 | Matías Martínez | 10.600 | 12.150 | 10.800 | 12.600 | 9.850 | 10.500 | 212.900 |
| 6 | Arturo Rossell | 12.500 | 10.600 | 10.950 | 13.650 | 11.800 | 11.500 | 212.900 |
| 6 | Nicolás Toro | 12.100 | 11.600 | 10.300 | 12.250 | 11.000 | 11.050 | 212.900 |
| 7 | Argentina | 35.400 (7) | 34.550 (5) | 33.400 (6) | 38.550 (7) | 35.000 (5) | 33.800 (7) | 210.700 |
| 7 | Dylan Bratoz | 12.200 | 6.400 | 11.200 | 12.350 | 11.450 | 11.050 | 210.700 |
| 7 | Benjamín Fernández | 12.200 | 11.250 | 10.650 | 13.450 | 11.600 | 11.200 | 210.700 |
| 7 | Luciano Guerra | 10.350 | 11.650 | 11.550 | 12.750 | 11.000 | 10.750 | 210.700 |
| 7 | Juan Pozzi | 11.000 | 11.650 | 10.250 | 12.350 | 11.950 | 11.550 | 210.700 |
| 8 | Bolivia | 31.600 (8) | 23.500 (8) | 26.750 (8) | 34.100 (8) | 30.700 (8) | 29.900 (8) | 176.550 |
| 8 | Luis Arancibia | 10.550 | 7.550 | 4.050 | 10.550 | 10.300 | 9.400 | 176.550 |
| 8 | Dereck Cueto | 9.050 | 8.400 | 9.900 | 11.650 | 9.450 | 10.150 | 176.550 |
| 8 | José Mateo Garvizu | 10.500 | 6.650 | 7.950 | 11.350 | 10.650 | 9.850 | 176.550 |
| 8 | Yerick Leigue | 10.550 | 7.550 | 8.900 | 11.100 | 9.750 | 9.900 | 176.550 |

==== Men's individual all-around ====
Final – August 19

| Rank | Gymnast | Floor (gymnastics) | Pommel horse | Rings (gymnastics) | Vault (gymnastics) | Parallel bars | Horizontal bar | Total |
|---|---|---|---|---|---|---|---|---|
| 1st place, gold medalist(s) | Thomas Mejía (COL) | 13.100 | 12.200 | 11.600 | 13.100 | 12.950 | 12.400 | 75.350 |
| 2nd place, silver medalist(s) | Pedro Henrique Silvestre (BRA) | 12.100 | 12.960 | 11.900 | 13.400 | 12.500 | 12.400 | 75.250 |
| 3rd place, bronze medalist(s) | Jason Hao (USA) | 12.850 | 12.450 | 11.750 | 13.250 | 11.950 | 12.500 | 74.740 |
| 4 | Camilo Vera (COL) | 11.100 | 10.650 | 12.750 | 13.300 | 13.350 | 13.300 | 74.450 |
| 5 | Thomas Tittley (CAN) | 13.300 | 11.800 | 11.600 | 13.150 | 11.650 | 12.750 | 74.250 |
| 6 | William McCrea (USA) | 12.750 | 11.800 | 11.900 | 13.900 | 12.250 | 11.250 | 73.850 |
| 7 | Dominick Camarena (USA) | 12.400 | 12.300 | 11.150 | 12.600 | 12.850 | 12.400 | 73.700 |
| 8 | Lorenzo Zaragoza (MEX) | 12.450 | 11.450 | 12.350 | 13.450 | 11.550 | 12.250 | 73.500 |
| 9 | Nixon Miles (USA) | 11.300 | 11.900 | 11.950 | 13.200 | 12.200 | 12.200 | 72.750 |
| 10 | Aiden Gonzalez (CAN) | 12.450 | 11.750 | 11.000 | 13.150 | 12.100 | 12.150 | 72.600 |
| 11 | Jorman Álvarez (COL) | 12.350 | 11.300 | 11.700 | 12.200 | 13.200 | 11.600 | 72.350 |
| 12 | Aaron Ibarra (MEX) | 12.950 | 11.800 | 11.700 | 12.300 | 12.750 | 10.600 | 72.100 |
| 13 | Stefano Alessandro (ECU) | 12.250 | 12.350 | 11.850 | 13.250 | 11.200 | 10.950 | 71.850 |
| 14 | Ivan Botelho (BRA) | 12.300 | 12.000 | 11.800 | 12.550 | 11.350 | 11.700 | 71.700 |
| 15 | Jensuel Soto (PUR) | 12.000 | 11.400 | 12.150 | 14.000 | 10.450 | 11.650 | 71.650 |
| 16 | Juan Pablo Dueñas (MEX) | 11.550 | 11.900 | 11.100 | 13.250 | 12.350 | 11.450 | 71.600 |
| 17 | Arturo Rossell (CHI) | 12.500 | 10.600 | 10.950 | 13.650 | 11.800 | 11.500 | 71.000 |
| 18 | Agustín Espinoza (CHI) | 12.700 | 10.100 | 11.350 | 13.600 | 11.300 | 11.650 | 70.700 |
| 19 | Benjamín Fernández (ARG) | 12.200 | 11.250 | 10.650 | 13.450 | 11.600 | 11.200 | 70.350 |
| 20 | Domenick Godoy (ECU) | 9.900 | 10.900 | 11.500 | 13.000 | 11.400 | 12.550 | 69.250 |
| 21 | Eduardo Belli (BRA) | 12.000 | 10.550 | 11.400 | 12.350 | 11.650 | 11.250 | 69.200 |
| 21 | Gael Rosales (MEX) | 11.700 | 10.200 | 11.350 | 12.400 | 12.200 | 11.350 | 69.200 |
| 23 | Juan Pozzi (ARG) | 11.000 | 11.650 | 10.250 | 12.350 | 11.950 | 11.550 | 68.750 |
| 24 | Matías Ramos (COL) | 12.050 | 11.750 | 10.800 | 12.450 | 9.800 | 11.650 | 68.500 |
| 25 | Parker Smith (CAN) | 11.700 | 10.750 | 10.600 | 12.750 | 11.050 | 11.500 | 68.350 |
| 26 | Nicolás Toro (CHI) | 12.100 | 11.600 | 10.300 | 12.250 | 11.000 | 11.050 | 68.300 |
| 27 | Luciano Guerra (ARG) | 10.350 | 11.650 | 11.550 | 12.750 | 11.000 | 10.750 | 68.050 |
| 28 | Caio Pereira (BRA) | 11.850 | 11.100 | 11.250 | 12.700 | 10.300 | 10.350 | 67.550 |
| 29 | Jefferson García (GUA) | 12.500 | 11.000 | 10.450 | 13.350 | 10.150 | 9.800 | 67.250 |
| 30 | Matías Martínez (CHI) | 10.600 | 12.150 | 10.800 | 12.600 | 9.850 | 10.500 | 66.500 |
| 31 | David Ayala (PUR) | 11.000 | 10.500 | 10.200 | 12.500 | 11.400 | 10.150 | 65.750 |
| 32 | Dylan Bratoz (ARG) | 12.200 | 6.400 | 11.200 | 12.350 | 11.450 | 11.050 | 64.650 |
| 33 | Sebastián Torres (VEN) | 10.950 | 11.000 | 8.550 | 12.650 | 9.550 | 9.100 | 61.800 |
| 34 | Gael Zamora (CRC) | 9.150 | 9.100 | 10.650 | 11.050 | 9.100 | 10.350 | 59.400 |
| 35 | Dereck Cueto (BOL) | 9.050 | 8.400 | 9.900 | 11.650 | 9.450 | 10.150 | 58.600 |
| 36 | Yerick Leigue (BOL) | 10.550 | 7.550 | 8.900 | 11.100 | 9.750 | 9.900 | 57.750 |
| 37 | José Mateo Garvizu (BOL) | 10.500 | 6.650 | 7.950 | 11.350 | 10.650 | 9.850 | 56.950 |
| 38 | Luis Arancibia (BOL) | 10.550 | 7.550 | 4.050 | 10.550 | 10.300 | 9.400 | 52.400 |
| 39 | Valentin Fumont (URU) | 9.450 | 7.300 | 2.950 | 10.750 | 10.300 | 9.450 | 50.200 |
| | Caleb Ysava (VEN) | DNS | 9.700 | 9.850 | 13.500 | 12.000 | 10.850 | DNF |
| | Maicol Falero (URU) | 9.550 | 2.250 | 8.350 | 9.600 | 8.150 | DNS | DNF |
| | Keita Kuramoto (CAN) | DNS | DNS | 11.250 | 13.450 | DNS | DNS | DNF |

==== Men's floor ====
Final – August 21

| Rank | Gymnast | D Score | E Score | Pen. | Total |
|---|---|---|---|---|---|
| 1st place, gold medalist(s) | Thomas Tittley (CAN) | 4.9 | 8.300 | | 13.200 |
| 2nd place, silver medalist(s) | Arturo Rossell (CHI) | 5.1 | 7.566 | | 12.666 |
| 3rd place, bronze medalist(s) | Thomas Mejía (COL) | 4.5 | 7.933 | | 12.433 |
| 4 | Aaron Ibarra (MEX) | 4.4 | 7.933 | | 12.333 |
| 5 | Agustín Espinoza (CHI) | 4.9 | 7.333 | | 12.233 |
| 6 | Jefferson García (GUA) | 4.7 | 7.600 | 0.3 | 12.000 |
| 7 | William McCrea (USA) | 5.1 | 7.166 | 0.3 | 11.966 |
| 8 | Jason Hao (USA) | 4.7 | 7.233 | | 11.933 |

==== Men's pommel horse ====
Final – August 21

| Rank | Gymnast | D Score | E Score | Pen. | Total |
|---|---|---|---|---|---|
| 1st place, gold medalist(s) | Pedro Henrique Silvestre (BRA) | 4.2 | 8.066 | | 12.266 |
| 2nd place, silver medalist(s) | Matías Martínez (CHI) | 4.4 | 7.800 | | 12.200 |
| 3rd place, bronze medalist(s) | Jason Hao (USA) | 4.2 | 7.900 | | 12.100 |
| 4 | Thomas Mejía (COL) | 3.6 | 8.266 | | 11.866 |
| 4 | Juan Pablo Dueñas (MEX) | 3.8 | 8.066 | | 11.866 |
| 4 | Dominick Camarena (USA) | 3.8 | 8.066 | | 11.866 |
| 7 | Ivan Botelho (BRA) | 3.5 | 8.300 | | 11.800 |
| 8 | Stefano Alessandro (ECU) | 3.6 | 6.433 | | 10.033 |

==== Men's rings ====
Final – August 21

| Rank | Gymnast | D Score | E Score | Bon. | Pen. | Total |
|---|---|---|---|---|---|---|
| 1st place, gold medalist(s) | Lorenzo Zaragoza (MEX) | 4.1 | 8.400 | | 0.1 | 12.600 |
| 2nd place, silver medalist(s) | Jensuel Soto (PUR) | 4.0 | 8.566 | | | 12.566 |
| 3rd place, bronze medalist(s) | Nixon Miles (USA) | 3.2 | 8.733 | | 0.1 | 12.033 |
| 4 | Camilo Vera (COL) | 4.3 | 7.666 | | | 11.966 |
| 5 | William McCrea (USA) | 3.8 | 8.133 | | | 11.933 |
| 6 | Stefano Alessandro (ECU) | 4.2 | 7.566 | | | 11.766 |
| 7 | Pedro Henrique Silvestre (BRA) | 3.5 | 7.000 | | 0.1 | 10.600 |
| 8 | Ivan Botelho (BRA) | 3.5 | 6.933 | | | 10.433 |

==== Men's vault ====
Final – August 22

| Rank | Gymnast | Vault 1 | | | | Vault 2 | | | | | Total |
| Rank | Gymnast | D Score | E Score | Pen. | Score 1 | D Score | E Score | Pen. | Bon. | Score 2 | Total |
|---|---|---|---|---|---|---|---|---|---|---|---|
| 1st place, gold medalist(s) | Camilo Vera (COL) | 4.8 | 9.233 | | 14.033 | 4.8 | 9.133 | | | 13.933 | 13.983 |
| 2nd place, silver medalist(s) | William McCrea (USA) | 4.8 | 8.900 | | 13.700 | 4.8 | 9.100 | | | 13.900 | 13.800 |
| 3rd place, bronze medalist(s) | Jensuel Soto (PUR) | 4.8 | 8.666 | | 13.466 | 4.8 | 8.833 | | | 13.633 | 13.549 |
| 4 | Agustín Espinoza (CHI) | 4.4 | 8.866 | | 13.266 | 4.4 | 8.933 | | | 13.333 | 13.299 |
| 5 | Pedro Henrique Silvestre (BRA) | 4.4 | 8.900 | | 13.300 | 4.4 | 8.833 | | | 13.233 | 13.266 |
| 6 | Arturo Rossell (CHI) | 4.4 | 8.900 | | 13.300 | 4.4 | 8.633 | | | 13.033 | 13.166 |
| 7 | Benjamín Fernández (ARG) | 4.4 | 8.466 | | 12.866 | 3.6 | 9.133 | | 0.1 | 12.833 | 12.849 |
| 8 | Juan Pablo Dueñas (MEX) | 3.2 | 8.033 | 0.3 | 10.933 | 3.6 | 8.400 | 0.1 | | 11.900 | 11.416 |

==== Men's parallel bars ====
Final – August 22

| Rank | Gymnast | D Score | E Score | Pen. | Bon. | Total |
|---|---|---|---|---|---|---|
| 1st place, gold medalist(s) | Jorman Álvarez (COL) | 5.5 | 7.700 | | 0.1 | 13.300 |
| 1st place, gold medalist(s) | Camilo Vera (COL) | 4.9 | 8.400 | | | 13.300 |
| 3rd place, bronze medalist(s) | Aaron Ibarra (MEX) | 4.1 | 8.433 | | | 12.533 |
| 4 | Pedro Henrique Silvestre (BRA) | 3.8 | 8.600 | | | 12.400 |
| 5 | Dominick Camarena (USA) | 4.0 | 8.166 | | | 12.166 |
| 6 | Aiden Gonzalez (CAN) | 3.8 | 8.333 | | | 12.133 |
| 7 | William McCrea (USA) | 4.1 | 7.833 | | | 11.933 |
| 8 | Juan Pablo Dueñas (MEX) | 3.8 | 7.333 | | | 11.133 |

==== Men's horizontal bar ====
Final – August 22

| Rank | Gymnast | D Score | E Score | Pen. | Bon. | Total |
|---|---|---|---|---|---|---|
| 1st place, gold medalist(s) | Camilo Vera (COL) | 5.8 | 8.000 | | | 13.800 |
| 2nd place, silver medalist(s) | Thomas Tittley (CAN) | 4.4 | 8.433 | | | 12.833 |
| 3rd place, bronze medalist(s) | Pedro Henrique Silvestre (BRA) | 4.6 | 8.200 | | | 12.800 |
| 4 | Domenick Godoy (ECU) | 4.5 | 8.133 | | | 12.633 |
| 5 | Lorenzo Zaragoza (MEX) | 4.4 | 8.166 | | | 12.566 |
| 6 | Jason Hao (USA) | 4.1 | 7.933 | | | 12.033 |
| 7 | Dominick Camarena (USA) | 3.2 | 7.566 | | | 10.766 |
| 8 | Thomas Mejía (COL) | 3.2 | 7.366 | | 0.1 | 10.666 |

==== Women's team all-around ====
Final – August 20

| Rank | Team | Vault (gymnastics) | Uneven bars | Balance beam | Floor (gymnastics) | Total |
|---|---|---|---|---|---|---|
| 1st place, gold medalist(s) | United States | 41.000 (1) | 37.050 (1) | 36.350 (1) | 37.900 (1) | 152.300 |
| 1st place, gold medalist(s) | Addalye VanGrinsven | 13.700 | 12.300 | 12.050 | 12.550 | 152.300 |
| 1st place, gold medalist(s) | Charleigh Bullock | 13.550 | 12.450 | 12.800 | 12.850 | 152.300 |
| 1st place, gold medalist(s) | Kylie Smith | 13.400 | 12.300 | 11.500 | 12.500 | 152.300 |
| 1st place, gold medalist(s) | Lavienna Crain | 13.900 | 11.700 | DNS | | 152.300 |
| 2nd place, silver medalist(s) | Brazil | 39.150 (3) | 35.800 (3) | 35.850 (3) | 35.050 (4) | 145.850 |
| 2nd place, silver medalist(s) | Francine Oliveira | 13.300 | 11.050 | 12.150 | 11.800 | 145.850 |
| 2nd place, silver medalist(s) | Isabel Aguilar | 12.850 | 12.700 | 12.100 | 10.900 | 145.850 |
| 2nd place, silver medalist(s) | Sophia Carvalho | 10.800 | 12.050 | 11.600 | 11.400 | 145.850 |
| 2nd place, silver medalist(s) | Kauany Aquino | 13.300 | 9.650 | 11.100 | 11.850 | 145.850 |
| 3rd place, bronze medalist(s) | Canada | 39.700 (2) | 36.000 (2) | 34.300 (5) | 35.450 (3) | 145.450 |
| 3rd place, bronze medalist(s) | Coralie Demers | 13.300 | 11.700 | 12.000 | 11.750 | 145.450 |
| 3rd place, bronze medalist(s) | Maryam Saber | 13.100 | 12.050 | 9.750 | 10.350 | 145.450 |
| 3rd place, bronze medalist(s) | Samantha Couture | 12.150 | 11.800 | 10.950 | 11.600 | 145.450 |
| 3rd place, bronze medalist(s) | Stella Letendre | 13.300 | 12.150 | 11.350 | 12.100 | 145.450 |
| 4 | Argentina | 38.100 (4) | 34.850 (4) | 36.350 (1) | 36.000 (2) | 145.300 |
| 4 | Amparo Diez | 12.600 | 11.500 | 12.200 | 9.800 | 145.300 |
| 4 | Juana Azerman | 12.350 | 10.650 | 9.050 | 11.800 | 145.300 |
| 4 | Julieta Lucas | 13.150 | 12.700 | 12.750 | 12.500 | 145.300 |
| 4 | Luana Olivetto | 12.150 | 10.400 | 11.400 | 11.700 | 145.300 |
| 5 | Mexico | 37.600 (5) | 31.250 (6) | 33.600 (7) | 34.750 (5) | 137.200 |
| 5 | Debanhi Ochoa | 11.800 | 9.850 | 10.550 | 11.650 | 137.200 |
| 5 | Dominica Escartin | 13.200 | 12.150 | 10.850 | 11.950 | 137.200 |
| 5 | Emma Martínez | 11.350 | 7.200 | 11.650 | 11.150 | 137.200 |
| 5 | Maia Abascal | 12.600 | 9.250 | 11.100 | 11.150 | 137.200 |
| 6 | Panama | 35.550 (9) | 33.700 (5) | 34.600 (4) | 32.400 (8) | 136.250 |
| 6 | Ana Beitia | 12.350 | 11.850 | 12.300 | 11.350 | 136.250 |
| 6 | Aylin Goon | 11.550 | 10.150 | 9.750 | 10.250 | 136.250 |
| 6 | María Eloisa Rojas | 0.000 | 9.700 | 10.500 | 8.450 | 136.250 |
| 6 | Susan Madera | 11.650 | 11.700 | 11.800 | 10.800 | 136.250 |
| 7 | Venezuela | 35.100 (11) | 29.300 (8) | 34.050 (6) | 34.300 (7) | 132.750 |
| 7 | Oriana Fernández | 11.450 | 8.600 | 9.050 | 10.700 | 132.750 |
| 7 | Sofía García | 12.050 | 10.650 | 11.400 | 12.200 | 132.750 |
| 7 | Sofía Rojas | 11.350 | 9.750 | 12.000 | 11.150 | 132.750 |
| 7 | Valeria Villamizar | 11.600 | 8.900 | 10.650 | 10.950 | 132.750 |
| 8 | Guatemala | 35.650 (7) | 29.500 (7) | 32.600 (8) | 34.600 (6) | 132.350 |
| 8 | Ana García | 11.750 | 8.700 | 11.550 | 11.500 | 132.350 |
| 8 | Mersi Xep | 11.700 | 9.700 | 9.850 | 11.400 | 132.350 |
| 8 | Vania Herrera | 11.950 | 9.900 | 11.200 | 11.700 | 132.350 |
| 8 | Wendoly Guzmán | 11.950 | 9.900 | 9.700 | 11.100 | 132.350 |
| 9 | Ecuador | 35.300 (10) | 28.250 (9) | 31.150 (9) | 32.400 (8) | 127.100 |
| 9 | Isabella Kozhaya | 11.950 | DNS | 9.750 | DNS | 127.100 |
| 9 | Safina Tenorio | 10.200 | 9.250 | 7.850 | 10.550 | 127.100 |
| 9 | Viviana Villavicencio | 11.800 | 8.300 | 10.850 | 10.800 | 127.100 |
| 9 | Ximena Estrada | 11.550 | 10.700 | 10.550 | 11.050 | 127.100 |
| 10 | Chile | 36.600 (6) | 26.550 (10) | 26.850 (10) | 31.300 (10) | 121.300 |
| 10 | Maite Morales | 12.350 | 8.400 | 7.250 | 10.850 | 121.300 |
| 10 | Mayra Pereira | 12.250 | 8.400 | 8.300 | 10.150 | 121.300 |
| 10 | Pascal Jiménez | 11.300 | 9.750 | 9.350 | 10.150 | 121.300 |
| 10 | Taís Goncalves | 12.000 | 7.900 | 9.200 | 10.300 | 121.300 |
| 11 | Dominican Republic | 34.550 (12) | 23.100 (11) | 25.650 (11) | 30.450 (11) | 113.750 |
| 11 | Abby Tejeda | 10.800 | 7.650 | 4.050 | 9.450 | 113.750 |
| 11 | Analis Pérez | 12.100 | 7.600 | 11.700 | 10.950 | 113.750 |
| 11 | Mía Lugo | 11.650 | 7.850 | 9.900 | 10.050 | 113.750 |
| 12 | Bolivia | 35.650 (7) | 22.300 (12) | 25.500 (12) | 29.350 (12) | 112.800 |
| 12 | Mayte Burgos | 11.850 | 7.550 | 6.100 | 9.450 | 112.800 |
| 12 | Mila Ormachea | 11.750 | 6.000 | 9.150 | 10.150 | 112.800 |
| 12 | Miriam Pérez | 10.850 | 5.650 | 5.950 | 8.500 | 112.800 |
| 12 | Sara Castellon | 12.050 | 8.750 | 10.250 | 9.750 | 112.800 |

==== Women's individual all-around ====
Final – August 20

| Rank | Gymnast | Vault (gymnastics) | Uneven bars | Balance beam | Floor (gymnastics) | Total |
|---|---|---|---|---|---|---|
| 1st place, gold medalist(s) | Charleigh Bullock (USA) | 13.550 | 12.450 | 12.800 | 12.850 | 51.450 |
| 2nd place, silver medalist(s) | Julieta Lucas (ARG) | 13.150 | 12.700 | 12.750 | 12.500 | 51.100 |
| 3rd place, bronze medalist(s) | Addalye VanGrinsven (USA) | 13.700 | 12.300 | 12.050 | 12.550 | 50.600 |
| 4 | Kylie Smith (USA) | 13.400 | 12.300 | 11.500 | 12.500 | 49.700 |
| 5 | Stella Letendre (CAN) | 13.300 | 12.150 | 11.350 | 12.100 | 48.900 |
| 6 | Coralie Demers (CAN) | 13.300 | 11.700 | 12.000 | 11.750 | 48.750 |
| 7 | Isabel Aguilar (BRA) | 12.850 | 12.700 | 12.100 | 10.900 | 48.550 |
| 8 | Dominica Escartin (MEX) | 13.200 | 12.150 | 10.850 | 11.950 | 48.150 |
| 9 | Francine Oliveira (BRA) | 13.300 | 11.050 | 12.150 | 11.800 | 48.000 |
| 10 | Ana Beitia (PAN) | 12.350 | 11.850 | 12.300 | 11.350 | 47.850 |
| 11 | Samantha Couture (CAN) | 12.150 | 11.800 | 10.950 | 11.600 | 46.500 |
| 12 | Sofía García (VEN) | 12.050 | 10.650 | 11.400 | 12.200 | 46.300 |
| 13 | Amparo Diez (ARG) | 12.600 | 11.500 | 12.200 | 9.800 | 46.100 |
| 14 | Susan Madera (PAN) | 11.650 | 11.700 | 11.800 | 10.800 | 45.950 |
| 15 | Kauany Aquino (BRA) | 13.300 | 9.650 | 11.100 | 11.850 | 45.900 |
| 16 | Sophia Carvalho (BRA) | 10.800 | 12.050 | 11.600 | 11.400 | 45.850 |
| 17 | Luana Olivetto (ARG) | 12.150 | 10.400 | 11.400 | 11.700 | 45.650 |
| 18 | Isabella Marenco (URU) | 12.700 | 10.000 | 11.500 | 11.300 | 45.500 |
| 19 | Maryam Saber (CAN) | 13.100 | 12.050 | 9.750 | 10.350 | 45.250 |
| 20 | Vania Herrera (GUA) | 11.950 | 9.900 | 11.200 | 11.700 | 44.750 |
| 21 | Sofía Rojas (VEN) | 11.350 | 9.750 | 12.000 | 11.150 | 44.250 |
| 22 | Camila Buck (URU) | 11.600 | 11.100 | 10.450 | 11.050 | 44.200 |
| 23 | Maia Abascal (MEX) | 12.600 | 9.250 | 11.100 | 11.150 | 44.100 |
| 24 | Juana Azerman (ARG) | 12.350 | 10.650 | 9.050 | 11.800 | 43.850 |
| 25 | Ximena Estrada (ECU) | 11.550 | 10.700 | 10.550 | 11.050 | 43.850 |
| 25 | Debanhi Ochoa (MEX) | 11.800 | 9.850 | 10.550 | 11.650 | 43.850 |
| 27 | Ana García (GUA) | 11.750 | 8.700 | 11.550 | 11.500 | 43.500 |
| 28 | Mersi Xep (GUA) | 11.700 | 9.700 | 9.850 | 11.400 | 42.650 |
| 28 | Wendoly Guzmán (GUA) | 11.950 | 9.900 | 9.700 | 11.100 | 42.650 |
| 30 | Alanis Pérez (DOM) | 12.100 | 7.600 | 11.700 | 10.950 | 42.350 |
| 31 | Valeria Villamizar (VEN) | 11.600 | 8.900 | 10.650 | 10.950 | 42.100 |
| 32 | Viviana Villavicencio (ECU) | 11.800 | 8.300 | 10.850 | 10.800 | 41.750 |
| 33 | Aylin Goon (PAN) | 11.550 | 10.150 | 9.750 | 10.250 | 41.700 |
| 34 | Alessia Suárez (PER) | 10.950 | 9.450 | 10.500 | 10.500 | 41.400 |
| 35 | Emma Martínez (MEX) | 11.350 | 7.200 | 11.650 | 11.150 | 41.350 |
| 36 | Sara Castellon (BOL) | 12.050 | 8.750 | 10.250 | 9.750 | 40.800 |
| 37 | Pascal Jiménez (CHI) | 11.300 | 9.750 | 9.350 | 10.150 | 40.550 |
| 38 | Salome Ubeda (CRC) | 10.650 | 9.200 | 9.900 | 10.150 | 39.900 |
| 39 | Oriana Fernández (VEN) | 11.450 | 8.600 | 9.050 | 10.700 | 39.800 |
| 40 | Mía Lugo (DOM) | 11.650 | 7.850 | 9.900 | 10.050 | 39.450 |
| 41 | Taís Goncalves (CHI) | 12.000 | 7.900 | 9.200 | 10.300 | 39.400 |
| 42 | Mayra Pereira (CHI) | 12.250 | 8.400 | 8.300 | 10.150 | 39.100 |
| 43 | Maite Morales (CHI) | 12.350 | 8.400 | 7.250 | 10.850 | 38.850 |
| 44 | Safina Tenorio (ECU) | 10.200 | 9.250 | 7.850 | 10.550 | 37.850 |
| 45 | Mila Ormachea (BOL) | 11.750 | 6.000 | 9.150 | 10.150 | 37.050 |
| 46 | Ana Mendieta (PAR) | 11.000 | 8.300 | 7.900 | 9.200 | 36.400 |
| 47 | Mayte Burgos (BOL) | 11.850 | 7.550 | 6.100 | 9.450 | 34.950 |
| 48 | Luana Malpartida (PER) | 11.650 | 10.700 | 0.000 | 10.400 | 32.750 |
| 49 | Abby Tejeda (DOM) | 10.800 | 7.650 | 4.050 | 9.450 | 31.950 |
| 50 | Miriam Pérez (BOL) | 10.850 | 5.650 | 5.950 | 8.500 | 30.950 |
| 51 | María Eloisa Rojas (PAN) | 0.000 | 9.700 | 10.500 | 8.450 | 28.650 |
| 52 | Akary Valle (NCA) | 9.500 | 7.300 | 0.000 | 8.800 | 25.600 |
| | Isabella Kozhaya (ECU) | 11.950 | DNS | 9.750 | DNS | DNF |

==== Women's floor ====
Final – August 22

| Rank | Gymnast | D Score | E Score | Pen. | Total |
|---|---|---|---|---|---|
| 1st place, gold medalist(s) | Charleigh Bullock (USA) | 4.5 | 8.000 | | 12.500 |
| 2nd place, silver medalist(s) | Stella Letendre (CAN) | 4.6 | 7.800 | | 12.400 |
| 3rd place, bronze medalist(s) | Dominica Escartin (MEX) | 4.4 | 7.866 | | 12.266 |
| 4 | Addalye VanGrinsven (USA) | 4.6 | 7.666 | | 12.266 |
| 5 | Julieta Lucas (ARG) | 4.8 | 7.400 | | 12.200 |
| 6 | Francine Oliveira (BRA) | 4.3 | 7.800 | | 12.100 |
| 7 | Sofía García (VEN) | 4.0 | 7.933 | | 11.933 |
| 8 | Juana Azerman (ARG) | 4.3 | 7.366 | 0.1 | 11.566 |
| 9 | Kauany Aquino (BRA) | 4.4 | 7.133 | | 11.533 |

==== Women's balance beam ====
Final – August 22

| Rank | Gymnast | D Score | E Score | Pen. | Total |
|---|---|---|---|---|---|
| 1st place, gold medalist(s) | Charleigh Bullock (USA) | 4.6 | 7.933 | | 12.533 |
| 2nd place, silver medalist(s) | Addalye VanGrinsven (USA) | 4.2 | 8.200 | | 12.400 |
| 3rd place, bronze medalist(s) | Isabel Aguilar (BRA) | 4.6 | 7.666 | | 12.266 |
| 4 | Francine Oliveira (BRA) | 4.3 | 6.900 | | 11.200 |
| 5 | Amparo Diez (ARG) | 4.4 | 6.733 | | 11.133 |
| 6 | Coralie Demers (CAN) | 4.5 | 6.466 | | 10.966 |
| 6 | Ana Beitia (PAN) | 4.4 | 6.566 | | 10.966 |
| 8 | Julieta Lucas (ARG) | 5.1 | 5.566 | | 10.666 |

==== Women's vault ====
Final – August 21

| Rank | Gymnast | Vault 1 | | | | Vault 2 | | | | Total |
| Rank | Gymnast | D Score | E Score | Pen. | Score 1 | D Score | E Score | Pen. | Score 2 | Total |
|---|---|---|---|---|---|---|---|---|---|---|
| 1st place, gold medalist(s) | Addalye VanGrinsven (USA) | 4.6 | 9.133 | | 13.733 | 4.2 | 9.033 | | 13.233 | 13.483 |
| 2nd place, silver medalist(s) | Kauany Aquino (BRA) | 4.2 | 8.966 | | 13.166 | 3.6 | 9.133 | | 12.733 | 12.949 |
| 3rd place, bronze medalist(s) | Coralie Demers (CAN) | 4.2 | 8.866 | | 13.066 | 3.6 | 9.200 | | 12.800 | 12.933 |
| 4 | Dominica Escartin (MEX) | 4.2 | 8.733 | | 12.933 | 3.6 | 9.133 | | 12.733 | 12.833 |
| 5 | Isabel Aguilar (BRA) | 4.2 | 8.800 | | 13.000 | 3.6 | 9.000 | | 12.600 | 12.800 |
| 6 | Julieta Lucas (ARG) | 4.2 | 8.466 | | 12.666 | 3.6 | 8.866 | | 12.466 | 12.566 |
| 7 | Lavienna Crain (USA) | 5.0 | 7.600 | 0.3 | 12.300 | 4.2 | 8.166 | | 12.366 | 12.333 |
| 8 | Stella Letendre (CAN) | 4.2 | 7.366 | 0.3 | 11.266 | 3.6 | 8.933 | | 12.533 | 11.899 |

==== Women's uneven bars ====
Final – August 21

| Rank | Gymnast | D Score | E Score | Pen. | Total |
|---|---|---|---|---|---|
| 1st place, gold medalist(s) | Charleigh Bullock (USA) | 5.8 | 8.200 | | 14.000 |
| 2nd place, silver medalist(s) | Julieta Lucas (ARG) | 5.1 | 7.200 | | 12.300 |
| 3rd place, bronze medalist(s) | Dominica Escartin (MEX) | 4.7 | 7.466 | | 12.166 |
| 4 | Addalye VanGrinsven (USA) | 4.2 | 7.833 | | 12.033 |
| 5 | Stella Letendre (CAN) | 4.4 | 7.400 | | 11.800 |
| 6 | Sophia Carvalho (BRA) | 4.6 | 7.000 | | 11.600 |
| 7 | Maryam Saber (CAN) | 4.5 | 6.966 | | 11.466 |
| 8 | Isabel Aguilar (BRA) | 4.8 | 6.366 | | 11.166 |

=== Rhythmic gymnastics ===
==== Individual all-around ====
Date: August 12

| Rank | Gymnast | Nation | Hoop (rhythmic gymnastics) | Ball (rhythmic gymnastics) | Clubs (rhythmic gymnastics) | Ribbon (rhythmic gymnastics) | Total | Notes |
|---|---|---|---|---|---|---|---|---|
| 1st place, gold medalist(s) | Natalie de la Rosa | United States | 25.350 | 25.150 | 26.200 | 24.700 | 101.400 | |
| 2nd place, silver medalist(s) | Anna Filipp | United States | 24.450 | 25.200 | 24.500 | 25.250 | 99.400 | |
| 3rd place, bronze medalist(s) | Sarah Mourão | Brazil | 23.700 | 24.950 | 25.750 | 23.050 | 97.450 | |
| 4 | Ana Luisa Abraham | Mexico | 23.050 | 23.800 | 24.700 | 24.050 | 95.600 | |
| 5 | Marijose Delgado | Mexico | 24.150 | 23.000 | 24.250 | 22.800 | 94.200 | |
| 6 | Beatriz Vieira | Brazil | 21.600 | 23.300 | 24.050 | 23.050 | 92.000 | |
| 7 | Susana Valbuena | Venezuela | 21.500 | 22.350 | 21.850 | 20.500 | 86.200 | |
| 8 | Camila Arismendi | Venezuela | 21.250 | 21.500 | 20.550 | 20.900 | 84.200 | |
| 9 | Ana Carolina de Conto | Paraguay | 20.850 | 20.900 | 21.550 | 17.000 | 80.300 | |
| 10 | Catalina Neri | Argentina | 22.100 | 19.650 | 20.300 | 17.850 | 79.900 | |
| 11 | Emma Ceballos | Argentina | 21.050 | 20.000 | 19.600 | 19.150 | 79.800 | |
| 12 | Dominga Badilla | Chile | 20.650 | 19.550 | 18.900 | 20.100 | 79.2000 | |
| 13 | Rachel Levin | Costa Rica | 20.300 | 19.900 | 19.450 | 18.450 | 78.100 | |
| 14 | Melissa Parra | Ecuador | 18.600 | 19.150 | 20.300 | 19.550 | 77.600 | |
| 15 | Sofía Eguez | Bolivia | 18.900 | 19.850 | 19.350 | 17.100 | 75.200 | |
| 16 | Matilde Trivique | Chile | 19.250 | 19.600 | 18.850 | 15.750 | 73.450 | |
| 17 | Lizabeth Godales | Cuba | 18.950 | 17.050 | 20.800 | 16.200 | 73.000 | |
| 18 | Samantha Lay | Peru | 18.150 | 15.700 | 15.950 | 15.600 | 65.400 | |
| 19 | Ivanna Montes | El Salvador | 17.550 | 15.850 | 15.250 | 15.650 | 64.300 | |
| 20 | Zoe Sosa | Guatemala | 16.500 | 15.900 | 15.200 | 14.300 | 61.900 | |

==== Individual hoop ====
Qualification round – August 11

| Rank | Gymnast | Nation | Hoop (rhythmic gymnastics) | Notes |
|---|---|---|---|---|
| 1 | Natalie de la Rosa | United States | 25.350 | Q |
| 2 | Anna Filipp | United States | 24.450 | Q |
| 3 | Marijose Delgado | Mexico | 24.150 | Q |
| 4 | Sarah Mourão | Brazil | 23.700 | Q |
| 5 | Ana Luisa Abraham | Mexico | 23.050 | Q |
| 6 | Catalina Neiri | Argentina | 22.100 | Q |
| 7 | Beatriz Vieira | Brazil | 21.600 | Q |
| 8 | Susana Valbuena | Venezuela | 21.500 | Q |
| 9 | Camila Arismendi | Venezuela | 21.250 | R1 |
| 10 | Emma Ceballos | Argentina | 21.050 | R2 |
| 11 | Ana Carolina de Conto | Paraguay | 20.850 | R3 |
| 12 | Dominga Badilla | Chile | 20.650 | |
| 13 | Rachel Levin | Costa Rica | 20.300 | |
| 14 | Matilde Trivique | Chile | 19.250 | |
| 15 | Lizabeth Godales | Cuba | 18.950 | |
| 16 | Sofía Eguez | Bolivia | 18.900 | |
| 17 | Melissa Parra | Ecuador | 18.600 | |
| 18 | Samantha Lay | Peru | 18.150 | |
| 19 | Ivanna Montes | El Salvador | 17.550 | |
| 20 | Zoe Sosa | Guatemala | 16.500 | |

Final – August 13

| Rank | Gymnast | Nation | Hoop (rhythmic gymnastics) | Notes |
|---|---|---|---|---|
| 1st place, gold medalist(s) | Natalie de la Rosa | United States | 25.200 | |
| 2nd place, silver medalist(s) | Anna Filipp | United States | 24.650 | |
| 3rd place, bronze medalist(s) | Marijose Delgado | Mexico | 23.950 | |
| 4 | Ana Luisa Abraham | Mexico | 23.900 | |
| 5 | Sarah Mourão | Brazil | 23.200 | |
| 6 | Susana Valbuena | Venezuela | 22.900 | |
| 7 | Beatriz Vieira | Brazil | 21.650 | |
| 8 | Catalina Neiri | Argentina | 20.250 | |

==== Individual ball ====
Qualification round – August 11

| Rank | Gymnast | Nation | Ball (rhythmic gymnastics) | Notes |
|---|---|---|---|---|
| 1 | Anna Filipp | United States | 25.200 | Q |
| 2 | Natalie de la Rosa | United States | 25.150 | Q |
| 3 | Sarah Mourão | Brazil | 24.950 | Q |
| 4 | Ana Luisa Abraham | Mexico | 23.800 | Q |
| 5 | Beatriz Vieira | Brazil | 23.300 | Q |
| 6 | Marijose Delgado | Mexico | 23.000 | Q |
| 7 | Susana Valbuena | Venezuela | 22.350 | Q |
| 8 | Camila Arismendi | Venezuela | 21.500 | Q |
| 9 | Ana Carolina de Conto | Paraguay | 20.900 | R1 |
| 10 | Emma Ceballos | Argentina | 20.000 | R2 |
| 11 | Rachel Levin | Costa Rica | 19.900 | R3 |
| 12 | Sofía Eguez | Bolivia | 19.850 | |
| 13 | Catalina Neiri | Argentina | 19.650 | |
| 14 | Matilde Trivique | Chile | 19.600 | |
| 15 | Dominga Badilla | Chile | 19.550 | |
| 16 | Melissa Parra | Ecuador | 19.150 | |
| 17 | Lizabeth Godales | Cuba | 17.050 | |
| 18 | Zoe Sosa | Guatemala | 15.900 | |
| 19 | Ivanna Montes | El Salvador | 15.850 | |
| 20 | Samantha Lay | Peru | 15.700 | |

Final – August 13

| Rank | Gymnast | Nation | Ball (rhythmic gymnastics) | Notes |
|---|---|---|---|---|
| 1st place, gold medalist(s) | Ana Luisa Abraham | Mexico | 24.000 | |
| 2nd place, silver medalist(s) | Natalie de la Rosa | United States | 23.750 | |
| 3rd place, bronze medalist(s) | Sarah Mourão | Brazil | 23.450 | |
| 3rd place, bronze medalist(s) | Anna Filipp | United States | 23.450 | |
| 5 | Beatriz Vieira | Brazil | 21.800 | |
| 6 | Susana Valbuena | Venezuela | 20.950 | |
| 7 | Marijose Delgado | Mexico | 19.850 | |
| 8 | Camila Arismendi | Venezuela | 18.900 | |

==== Individual clubs ====
Qualification round – August 11

| Rank | Gymnast | Nation | Clubs (rhythmic gymnastics) | Notes |
|---|---|---|---|---|
| 1 | Natalie de la Rosa | United States | 26.200 | Q |
| 2 | Sarah Mourão | Brazil | 25.750 | Q |
| 3 | Ana Luisa Abraham | Mexico | 24.700 | Q |
| 4 | Anna Filipp | United States | 24.500 | Q |
| 5 | Marijose Delgado | Mexico | 24.250 | Q |
| 6 | Beatriz Vieira | Brazil | 24.050 | Q |
| 7 | Susana Valbuena | Venezuela | 21.850 | Q |
| 8 | Ana Carolina de Conto | Paraguay | 21.550 | Q |
| 9 | Lizabeth Godales | Cuba | 20.800 | R1 |
| 10 | Camila Arismendi | Venezuela | 20.550 | R2 |
| 11 | Melissa Parra | Ecuador | 20.300 | R3 |
| 12 | Catalina Neiri | Argentina | 20.300 | |
| 13 | Emma Ceballos | Argentina | 19.600 | |
| 14 | Rachel Levin | Costa Rica | 19.450 | |
| 15 | Sofía Eguez | Bolivia | 19.350 | |
| 16 | Dominga Badilla | Chile | 18.900 | |
| 17 | Matilde Trivique | Chile | 18.850 | |
| 18 | Samantha Lay | Peru | 15.950 | |
| 19 | Ivanna Montes | El Salvador | 15.250 | |
| 20 | Zoe Sosa | Guatemala | 15.200 | |

Final – August 13

| Rank | Gymnast | Nation | Clubs (rhythmic gymnastics) | Notes |
|---|---|---|---|---|
| 1st place, gold medalist(s) | Anna Filipp | United States | 25.950 | |
| 2nd place, silver medalist(s) | Sarah Mourão | Brazil | 25.650 | |
| 3rd place, bronze medalist(s) | Natalie de la Rosa | United States | 25.250 | |
| 4 | Ana Luisa Abraham | Mexico | 24.750 | |
| 5 | Susana Valbuena | Venezuela | 22.900 | |
| 6 | Marijose Delgado | Mexico | 22.600 | |
| 7 | Beatriz Vieira | Brazil | 22.200 | |
| 8 | Ana Carolina de Conto | Paraguay | 21.450 | |

==== Individual ribbon ====
Qualification round – August 11

| Rank | Gymnast | Nation | Ribbon (rhythmic gymnastics) | Notes |
|---|---|---|---|---|
| 1 | Anna Filipp | United States | 25.250 | Q |
| 2 | Natalie de la Rosa | United States | 24.700 | Q |
| 3 | Ana Luisa Abraham | Mexico | 24.050 | Q |
| 4 | Sarah Mourão | Brazil | 23.050 | Q |
| 5 | Beatriz Vieira | Brazil | 23.050 | Q |
| 6 | Marijose Delgado | Mexico | 22.800 | Q |
| 7 | Camila Arismendi | Venezuela | 20.900 | Q |
| 8 | Susana Valbuena | Venezuela | 20.500 | Q |
| 9 | Dominga Badilla | Chile | 20.100 | R1 |
| 10 | Melissa Parra | Ecuador | 19.550 | R2 |
| 11 | Emma Ceballos | Argentina | 19.150 | R3 |
| 12 | Rachel Levin | Costa Rica | 18.450 | |
| 13 | Catalina Neiri | Argentina | 17.850 | |
| 14 | Sofía Eguez | Bolivia | 17.100 | |
| 15 | Ana Carolina de Conto | Paraguay | 17.000 | |
| 16 | Lizabeth Godales | Cuba | 16.200 | |
| 17 | Matilde Trivique | Chile | 15.750 | |
| 18 | Ivanna Montes | El Salvador | 15.650 | |
| 19 | Samantha Lay | Peru | 15.600 | |
| 20 | Zoe Sosa | Guatemala | 14.300 | |

Final – August 13

| Rank | Gymnast | Nation | Ribbon (rhythmic gymnastics) | Notes |
|---|---|---|---|---|
| 1st place, gold medalist(s) | Anna Filipp | United States | 25.550 | |
| 2nd place, silver medalist(s) | Sarah Mourão | Brazil | 25.100 | |
| 3rd place, bronze medalist(s) | Natalie de la Rosa | United States | 24.550 | |
| 4 | Ana Luisa Abraham | Mexico | 23.100 | |
| 5 | Camila Arismendi | Venezuela | 22.900 | |
| 6 | Marijose Delgado | Mexico | 22.450 | |
| 7 | Beatriz Vieira | Brazil | 22.100 | |
| 8 | Susana Valbuena | Venezuela | 22.000 | |

==== Group all-around ====
Date: August 12

| Position | Gymnast | Nation | 5 Hoops | 5 Clubs | Total |
|---|---|---|---|---|---|
| 1st place, gold medalist(s) | Martha Coldwell; Ana Carolina Martínez; Jaydi Novelo; Fernanda Ramírez; Bárbara Ponce | Mexico | 23.200 (2) | 22.750 (1) | 45.950 |
| 2nd place, silver medalist(s) | Alana Hirota; Leyla Kukhmazova; Nina Keys; Sasha Kuliyev; Ziahayana Khan | United States | 23.150 (3) | 21.100 (2) | 44.250 |
| 3rd place, bronze medalist(s) | Júlia Colere; Maria Luiza Albuquerque; Andriely Cichovicz; Amanda Manente; Alice Neves | Brazil | 24.650 (1) | 18.400 (4) | 43.050 |
| 4 | Fabiana Marin; Sofía Arrechedera; Sofía Ovalles; Camila Aguillon; Yoelenys Hernández | Venezuela | 18.800 (4) | 19.300 (3) | 38.100 |
| 5 | Agustina Clavería; Isidora González; Josefa Muñoz; Matilde Trivique; Leyla Zenteno | Chile | 15.600 (5) | 15.000 (6) | 30.600 |
| 6 | Alys Pacheco; Nathalia Bistuer; Thalia Lara; Aridays Johnson; Samantha Muñoz | Cuba | 14.650 (6) | 15.650 (5) | 30.300 |
| 7 | Isabella Brochero; Josefina Altamirano; Bianca Chioso; Julia Teijeiro; Malena Dre | Argentina | 14.000 (7) | 14.900 (7) | 28.900 |
| 8 | Ana Paula Ortiz; Cecilia Caballero; Fátima Solabarrieta; Luna Coronel; Kamila Chávez | Paraguay | 12.850 (8) | 14.150 (8) | 27.000 |

==== Group 5 hoops ====
Qualification round – August 11

| Rank | Gymnast | Nation | Hoop (rhythmic gymnastics) | Notes |
|---|---|---|---|---|
| 1 | Júlia Colere; Maria Luiza Albuquerque; Andriely Cichovicz; Amanda Manente; Alice Neves | Brazil | 24.650 | Q |
| 2 | Martha Coldwell; Ana Carolina Martínez; Jaydi Novelo; Fernanda Ramírez; Bárbara Ponce | Mexico | 23.200 | Q |
| 3 | Alana Hirota; Leyla Kukhmazova; Nina Keys; Sasha Kuliyev; Ziahayana Khan | United States | 23.150 | Q |
| 4 | Fabiana Marin; Sofía Arrechedera; Sofía Ovalles; Camila Aguillon; Yoelenys Hernández | Venezuela | 18.800 | Q |
| 5 | Agustina Clavería; Isidora González; Josefa Muñoz; Matilde Trivique; Leyla Zenteno | Chile | 15.600 | Q |
| 6 | Alys Pacheco; Nathalia Bistuer; Thalia Lara; Aridays Johnson; Samantha Muñoz | Cuba | 14.650 | Q |
| 7 | Isabella Brochero; Josefina Altamirano; Bianca Chioso; Julia Teijeiro; Malena Dre | Argentina | 14.000 | Q |
| 8 | Ana Paula Ortiz; Cecilia Caballero; Fátima Solabarrieta; Luna Coronel; Kamila Chávez | Paraguay | 12.850 | Q |

Final – August 13

| Rank | Gymnast | Nation | Hoop (rhythmic gymnastics) | Notes |
|---|---|---|---|---|
| 1st place, gold medalist(s) | Júlia Colere; Maria Luiza Albuquerque; Andriely Cichovicz; Amanda Manente; Alice Neves | Brazil | 24.550 | |
| 2nd place, silver medalist(s) | Martha Coldwell; Ana Carolina Martínez; Jaydi Novelo; Fernanda Ramírez; Bárbara Ponce | Mexico | 23.750 | |
| 3rd place, bronze medalist(s) | Alana Hirota; Leyla Kukhmazova; Nina Keys; Sasha Kuliyev; Ziahayana Khan | United States | 23.250 | |
| 4 | Fabiana Marin; Sofía Arrechedera; Sofía Ovalles; Camila Aguillon; Yoelenys Hernández | Venezuela | 20.250 | |
| 5 | Agustina Clavería; Isidora González; Josefa Muñoz; Matilde Trivique; Leyla Zenteno | Chile | 18.650 | |
| 6 | Isabella Brochero; Josefina Altamirano; Bianca Chioso; Julia Teijeiro; Malena Dre | Argentina | 16.600 | |
| 7 | Alys Pacheco; Nathalia Bistuer; Thalia Lara; Aridays Johnson; Samantha Muñoz | Cuba | 13.650 | |
| 8 | Ana Paula Ortiz; Cecilia Caballero; Fátima Solabarrieta; Luna Coronel; Kamila Chávez | Paraguay | 13.000 | |

==== Group 5 club pairs ====
Qualification round – August 11

| Rank | Gymnast | Nation | Clubs (rhythmic gymnastics) | Notes |
|---|---|---|---|---|
| 1 | Martha Coldwell; Ana Carolina Martínez; Jaydi Novelo; Fernanda Ramírez; Bárbara Ponce | Mexico | 22.750 | Q |
| 2 | Alana Hirota; Leyla Kukhmazova; Nina Keys; Sasha Kuliyev; Ziahayana Khan | United States | 21.100 | Q |
| 3 | Fabiana Marin; Sofía Arrechedera; Sofía Ovalles; Camila Aguillon; Yoelenys Hernández | Venezuela | 19.300 | Q |
| 4 | Júlia Colere; Maria Luiza Albuquerque; Andriely Cichovicz; Amanda Manente; Alice Neves | Brazil | 18.400 | Q |
| 5 | Alys Pacheco; Nathalia Bistuer; Thalia Lara; Aridays Johnson; Samantha Muñoz | Cuba | 15.650 | Q |
| 6 | Agustina Clavería; Isidora González; Josefa Muñoz; Matilde Trivique; Leyla Zenteno | Chile | 15.000 | Q |
| 7 | Isabella Brochero; Josefina Altamirano; Bianca Chioso; Julia Teijeiro; Malena Dre | Argentina | 14.900 | Q |
| 8 | Ana Paula Ortiz; Cecilia Caballero; Fátima Solabarrieta; Luna Coronel; Kamila Chávez | Paraguay | 14.150 | Q |

Final – August 13

| Rank | Gymnast | Nation | Clubs (rhythmic gymnastics) | Notes |
|---|---|---|---|---|
| 1st place, gold medalist(s) | Martha Coldwell; Ana Carolina Martínez; Jaydi Novelo; Fernanda Ramírez; Bárbara Ponce | Mexico | 23.650 | |
| 2nd place, silver medalist(s) | Alana Hirota; Leyla Kukhmazova; Nina Keys; Sasha Kuliyev; Ziahayana Khan | United States | 23.000 | |
| 3rd place, bronze medalist(s) | Júlia Colere; Maria Luiza Albuquerque; Andriely Cichovicz; Amanda Manente; Alice Neves | Brazil | 22.800 | |
| 4 | Fabiana Marin; Sofía Arrechedera; Sofía Ovalles; Camila Aguillon; Yoelenys Hernández | Venezuela | 20.950 | |
| 5 | Agustina Clavería; Isidora González; Josefa Muñoz; Matilde Trivique; Leyla Zenteno | Chile | 17.600 | |
| 6 | Ana Paula Ortiz; Cecilia Caballero; Fátima Solabarrieta; Luna Coronel; Kamila Chávez | Paraguay | 16.550 | |
| 7 | Isabella Brochero; Josefina Altamirano; Bianca Chioso; Julia Teijeiro; Malena Dre | Argentina | 15.700 | |
| 8 | Alys Pacheco; Nathalia Bistuer; Thalia Lara; Aridays Johnson; Samantha Muñoz | Cuba | 15.650 | |

=== Trampoline gymnastics ===
==== Men's individual ====
Qualification round – August 11

| Rank | Athlete | Nation | Diff. | Exce. | Time of F. | Horizon | Pen. | Scores | Total | Notes |
|---|---|---|---|---|---|---|---|---|---|---|
| 1 | Ryan Maccagnan | United States | 3.50; 17.00 | 18.30; 15.20 | 17.75; 16.49 | 8.70; 9.50 | | 49.25; 58.19 | 107.44 | Q |
| 2 | Donovan Guevara | Mexico | 2.80; 15.30 | 18.20; 15.10 | 17.18; 16.78 | 8.70; 8.50 | | 47.88; 56.68 | 104.56 | Q |
| 3 | Étienne Cloutier | Canada | 2.80; 14.90 | 18.40; 16.40 | 16.30; 15.56 | 9.40; 9.40 | | 46.90; 56.26 | 103.16 | Q |
| 4 | Wallace Celestino | Brazil | 2.80; 13.50 | 16.80; 15.80 | 17.30; 17.05 | 9.60; 9.60 | | 46.50; 55.95 | 102.45 | Q |
| 5 | Aldo Zuñiga | Mexico | 2.80; 14.90 | 17.90; 15.10 | 16.77; 16.07 | 9.30; 9.50 | | 46.77; 55.57 | 102.34 | Q |
| 6 | Cody Cyman | Canada | 2.80; 15.30 | 16.30; 14.30 | 16.95; 16.24 | 9.50; 9.10 | | 45.55; 54.94 | 100.49 | Q |
| 7 | Gabriel Ferreira | Brazil | 3.00; 13.00 | 17.10; 14.90 | 16.80; 16.25 | 9.40; 8.70 | | 46.30; 52.85 | 99.15 | Q |
| 8 | Manuel Sierra | Colombia | 2.80; 14.70 | 16.70; 13.10 | 16.79; 15.83 | 9.90; 9.20 | | 46.19; 52.83 | 99.00 | Q |
| 9 | Taj Gleitsman | United States | 1.10; 16.70 | 15.40; 13.00 | 15.59; 15.47 | 8.50; 9.30 | | 40.59; 54.47 | 95.06 | |
| 10 | Tomás Roberti | Argentina | 3.80; 13.70 | 15.30; 12.50 | 16.37; 14.33 | 9.10; 8.20 | | 44.57; 48.73 | 93.30 | |
| 11 | Zackdhyel Montoya | Venezuela | 2.30; 10.30 | 15.20; 13.00 | 15.75; 14.71 | 9.70; 9.20 | | 42.95; 47.21 | 90.16 | |
| 12 | Tobías Weise | Argentina | 0.00; 13.40 | 10.80; 15.60 | 10.75; 16.39 | 5.60; 9.00 | | 27.15; 54.39 | 81.54 | |

Final – August 12

| Rank | Athlete | Nation | Diff. | Exce. | Time of F. | Horizon | Pen. | Total | Notes |
|---|---|---|---|---|---|---|---|---|---|
| 1st place, gold medalist(s) | Ryan Maccagnan | United States | 17.00 | 1.60 | 16.50 | 9.70 | | 58.80 | |
| 2nd place, silver medalist(s) | Donovan Guevara | Mexico | 16.30 | 15.30 | 16.73 | 9.70 | | 58.03 | |
| 3rd place, bronze medalist(s) | Manuel Sierra | Colombia | 16.60 | 14.60 | 16.19 | 9.20 | | 56.59 | |
| 4 | Cody Cyman | Canada | 14.40 | 15.40 | 16.31 | 9.20 | | 55.31 | |
| 5 | Gabriel Ferreira | Brazil | 15.80 | 14.40 | 16.24 | 8.50 | | 54.94 | |
| 6 | Étienne Cloutier | Canada | 14.90 | 16.20 | 15.23 | 8.60 | | 54.93 | |
| 7 | Wallace Celestino | Brazil | 8.70 | 10.00 | 11.26 | 6.20 | | 36.16 | |
| 8 | Aldo Zuñiga | Mexico | 4.00 | 2.90 | 3.39 | 1.70 | | 11.99 | |

==== Women's individual ====
Qualification round – August 11

| Rank | Athlete | Nation | Diff. | Exce. | Time of F. | Horizon | Pen. | Scores | Total | Notes |
|---|---|---|---|---|---|---|---|---|---|---|
| 1 | Kennedi Roberts | United States | 2.60; 14.00 | 17.40; 15.00 | 15.18; 14.61 | 9.20; 8.80 | | 44.38; 52.41 | 96.79 | Q |
| 2 | Logan McCoy | United States | 2.80; 13.50 | 17.20; 13.80 | 15.61; 14.66 | 9.60; 8.80 | | 45.21; 50.76 | 98.97 | Q |
| 3 | Nicole Castellanos | Colombia | 1.90; 11.10 | 17.40; 15.70 | 15.26; 15.48 | 9.40; 9.30 | | 43.96; 51.58 | 95.54 | Q |
| 4 | Maria Luiza Marcante | Brazil | 2.60; 9.30 | 17.10; 17.10 | 15.24; 14.92 | 9.40; 9.10 | | 44.34; 50.42 | 94.76 | Q |
| 5 | Mélina Corriveau | Canada | 2.00; 13.40 | 16.20; 14.00 | 15.33; 14.48 | 9.60; 9.60 | | 43.13; 51.48 | 94.61 | Q |
| 6 | Rielle Bonne | Canada | 2.20; 14.10 | 15.10; 13.60 | 15.22; 14.99 | 9.20; 9.60 | | 41.72; 52.29 | 94.01 | Q |
| 7 | Jazmín Chaneton | Argentina | 1.50; 9.20 | 16.60; 14.00 | 14.64; 14.79 | 9.10; 9.10 | | 41.84; 47.09 | 88.93 | Q |
| 8 | Martina Quintana | Argentina | 2.80; 7.90 | 16.60; 15.00 | 14.70; 12.94 | 8.90; 8.10 | | 43.00; 43.94 | 86.94 | Q |
| 9 | Julia Rocha | Brazil | 2.80; 5.60 | 17.90; 10.30 | 16.44; 10.11 | 9.30; 5.60 | | 46.44; 31.61 | 78.05 | |
| 10 | Aixa de León | Mexico | 2.20; 7.80 | 16.50; 10.50 | 14.76; 10.34 | 8.90; 6.50 | | 42.36; 35.14 | 77.50 | |
| 11 | Maya Quinteros | Bolivia | 2.10; 5.20 | 15.00; 7.30 | 14.96; 7.46 | 9.40; 4.20 | | 41.46; 24.16 | 65.62 | |
| 12 | Verónica Borges | Mexico | 2.60; 3.90 | 6.00; 6.00 | 6.09; 5.86 | 3.40; 3.50 | | 18.09; 19.26 | 37.35 | |

Final – August 12

| Rank | Athlete | Nation | Diff. | Exce. | Time of F. | Horizon | Pen. | Total | Notes |
|---|---|---|---|---|---|---|---|---|---|
| 1st place, gold medalist(s) | Kennedi Roberts | United States | 14.00 | 14-90 | 14.94 | 9.40 | | 53.24 | |
| 2nd place, silver medalist(s) | Nicole Castellanos | Colombia | 11.10 | 16.30 | 15.75 | 9.60 | | 52.75 | |
| 3rd place, bronze medalist(s) | Maria Luiza Marcante | Brazil | 10.80 | 17.00 | 14.94 | 9.30 | | 52.04 | |
| 4 | Rielle Bonne | Canada | 14.10 | 13.70 | 14.88 | 9.10 | | 51.78 | |
| 5 | Mélina Corriveau | Canada | 14.30 | 13.50 | 14.37 | 9.30 | | 51.47 | |
| 6 | Martina Quintana | Argentina | 9.20 | 16.90 | 14.47 | 9.30 | | 49.87 | |
| 7 | Jazmín Chaneton | Argentina | 9.20 | 14.80 | 14.69 | 9.10 | | 47.79 | |
| 8 | Logan McCoy | United States | 6.00 | 6.40 | 7.57 | 4.30 | | 24.27 | |

==== Men's synchronized ====
Qualification round – August 11

| Rank | Athletes | Nation | Diff. | Exce. | Sync. | Horizon | Pen. | Total | Notes |
|---|---|---|---|---|---|---|---|---|---|
| 1 | Donovan Guevara; Aldo Zuñiga | Mexico | 15.30 | 7.42 | 17.08 | 8.90 | 0.40 | 48.30 | Q |
| 2 | Tomás Roberti; Tobías Weise | Argentina | 11.90 | 8.05 | 18.14 | 9.40 | 0.20 | 47.29 | Q |
| 3 | Étienne Cloutier; Cody Cyman | Canada | 13.30 | 7.80 | 14.66 | 9.30 | | 45.06 | Q |
| 4 | Gabriel Ferreira; Wallace Celestino | Brazil | 10.70 | 7.35 | 16.06 | 8.15 | | 42.26 | Q |
| 5 | Taj Gleitsman; Ryan Maccagnan | United States | 2.00 | 0.85 | 2.00 | 0.90 | | 5.75 | Q |

Final – August 12

| Rank | Athletes | Nation | Diff. | Exce. | Sync. | Horizon | Pen. | Total | Notes |
|---|---|---|---|---|---|---|---|---|---|
| 1st place, gold medalist(s) | Taj Gleitsman; Ryan Maccagnan | United States | 15.90 | 7.50 | 18.38 | 9.35 | | 51.13 | |
| 2nd place, silver medalist(s) | Étienne Cloutier; Cody Cyman | Canada | 13.30 | 8.02 | 17.44 | 9.35 | | 48.11 | |
| 3rd place, bronze medalist(s) | Tomás Roberti; Tobías Weise | Argentina | 11.90 | 8.30 | 17.60 | 9.45 | | 47.25 | |
| 4 | Gabriel Ferreira; Wallace Celestino | Brazil | 12.80 | 7.55 | 17.26 | 9.40 | | 47.01 | |
| 5 | Donovan Guevara; Aldo Zuñiga | Mexico | 10.60 | 5.00 | 12.36 | 6.40 | | 34.36 | |

==== Women's synchronized ====
Qualification round – August 11

| Rank | Athletes | Nation | Diff. | Exce. | Sync. | Horizon | Pen. | Total | Notes |
|---|---|---|---|---|---|---|---|---|---|
| 1 | Verónica Borges; Aixa de León | Mexico | 9.20 | 7.95 | 18.26 | 9.25 | | 44.66 | Q |
| 2 | Julia Rocha; Maria Luiza Marcante | Brazil | 9.00 | 7.72 | 17.16 | 9.30 | | 43.18 | Q |
| 3 | Jazmín Chaneton; Martina Quintana | Argentina | 9.00 | 7.67 | 13.36 | 9.45 | | 39.48 | Q |
| 4 | Logan McCoy; Kennedi Roberts | United States | 8.10 | 5.00 | 11.98 | 6.30 | | 31.38 | Q |
| 5 | Rielle Bonne; Mélina Corriveau | Canada | 5.40 | 2.75 | 7.64 | 3.65 | | 19.44 | Q |

Final – August 12

| Rank | Athletes | Nation | Diff. | Exce. | Sync. | Horizon | Pen. | Total | Notes |
|---|---|---|---|---|---|---|---|---|---|
| 1st place, gold medalist(s) | Rielle Bonne; Mélina Corriveau | Canada | 11.80 | 7.27 | 19.08 | 9.45 | | 47.60 | |
| 2nd place, silver medalist(s) | Logan McCoy; Kennedi Roberts | United States | 12.70 | 7.25 | 17.70 | 9.20 | | 46.85 | |
| 3rd place, bronze medalist(s) | Verónica Borges; Aixa de León | Mexico | 9.20 | 7.85 | 19.00 | 9.00 | | 45.05 | |
| 4 | Julia Rocha; Maria Luiza Marcante | Brazil | 9.00 | 8.45 | 16.56 | 9.60 | | 43.61 | |
| 5 | Jazmín Chaneton; Martina Quintana | Argentina | 4.70 | 4.00 | 8.92 | 4.55 | | 22.17 | |

== See also ==
- 2025 Pan American Artistic Gymnastics Championships
- 2025 Pan American Rhythmic Gymnastics Championships
- 2025 Pan American Trampoline and Tumbling Championships
