= Ryan Maccagnan =

American trampoline gymnast (born 2005)

- Born: December 1, 2005 (age 20) Colorado Springs, Colorado, U.S.

Gymnastics career
- Discipline: Trampoline gymnastics
- Country represented: United States
- Club: Merino Trampoline Gymnastics Academy
- Head coach: Nuno Merino
Medal record
Men's trampoline gymnastics
Representing United States
Pan American Championships
Gold medal – first place	2025 Santa Tecla	Individual
Gold medal – first place	2025 Santa Tecla	Synchro
Gold medal – first place	2025 Santa Tecla	Team
Pacific Rim Championships
Bronze medal – third place	2024 Cali	Team
Bronze medal – third place	2024 Cali	Individual
Junior Pan American Games
Gold medal – first place	2025 Asunción	Individual
Gold medal – first place	2025 Asunción	Synchro

Ryan Maccagnan (born December 1, 2005) is an American trampoline gymnast. He is a three-time Pan American Championships gold medalist.

== Gymnastics career ==
In May 2025, Maccagnan represented the United States at the 2025 Pan American Trampoline and Tumbling Championships, and won gold medals in the individual, synchro, and team events. In August 2025, he represented the United States at the 2025 Junior Pan American Games and won gold medals in the individual and synchro events. With the win, he earned an automatic berth to the 2027 Pan American Games.
