= Marijose Delgado =

American rhythmic gymnast (born 2010)

- Full name: Marijose Delgado Davila
- Born: 23 April 2011 (age 15) Cuernavaca

Gymnastics career
- Discipline: Rhythmic gymnastics
- Country represented: Mexico (2024–)
Medal record
Representing Mexico
Rhythmic gymnastics
Junior Pan American Championships
Silver medal – second place	2025 Asunción	Team
Silver medal – second place	2026 Rio de Janeiro	All-Around
Silver medal – second place	2026 Rio de Janeiro	Ball
Bronze medal – third place	2024 Guatemala City	Hoop
Bronze medal – third place	2024 Guatemala City	Ball
Junior Pan American Games
Bronze medal – third place	2025 Asunción	Hoop

Marijose Delgado Davila (born 23 April 2011) is a Mexican rhythmic gymnast. She represents Mexico in international competitions.

== Biography ==
In 2024 Delgado competed in the age group category (13 years old) at the Pan American Championships in Guatemala City, winning bronze with hoop and ball. In October she was invited to a training camp in Panama.

=== Junior ===
She became a junior in 2025, in May she took part in the Pan American Championships winning silver in teams along Ana Luisa Abraham and Mariann Estrada. It was then revealed she was chosen to represent Mexico at the 3rd Junior World Championships in Sofia along Abraham and the national junior group, being 24th with hoop, 18th with ribbon and 17th in teams. In August she participated in the Junior Pan American Games in Asunción, winning bronze with hoop behind Natalie de la Rosa and Anna Filipp.
