= Maria Luiza Albuquerque =

Brazilian rhythmic gymnast (born 2011)

- Full name: Maria Luiza Lima de Albuquerque
- Nickname: Malu
- Born: 5 November 2011 (age 14) Maceió

Gymnastics career
- Discipline: Rhythmic gymnastics
- Country represented: Brazil (2024–)
- Club: Clube Arena
- Head coach: Gabrielle Moraes
- Former coach: Juliana Coradine
Medal record
Rhythmic gymnastics
Representing Brazil
Junior Pan American Games
Gold medal – first place	2025 Asunción	5 Hoops
Bronze medal – third place	2025 Asunción	Group All-around
Bronze medal – third place	2025 Asunción	10 Clubs
Junior Pan American Championships
Gold medal – first place	2026 Rio de Janeiro	Group All-Around
Gold medal – first place	2026 Rio de Janeiro	5 Balls
Gold medal – first place	2026 Rio de Janeiro	5 Ribbons
Junior South American Championships
Gold medal – first place	2022 Paipa	3 Hoops

Maria Luiza Lima de Albuquerque (born 5 November 2011) is a Brazilian rhythmic gymnast. She represents Brazil in international competitions.

== Biography ==
In 2022 Albuquerque took 6th place in teams and 19th in the All-Around at the Brazilian Championships. In November she took part in the national group championships, winning gold in trio with 3 hoops among pre juniors. In December she won gold with 3 hoops at the South American Championships in Paipa, along Maria Fernanda Fausto and Isabella Correia.

The following year she got bronze at the 2023 Brazilian Championships. In November, she took silver in duo among pre juniors at the group championships.

In July 2024 she was 15th at the Brazilian national group championships among juniors. In December she was called up to integrate the Brazilian junior group, it was later announced she was selected to be part of the group rooster.

In August 2025 she made her debut with the group at the Junior Pan American Games in Asunción along Júlia Colere, Andriely Cichovicz, Amanda Manente and Alice Neves. There Brazil won gold with 5 hoops as well as bronze in the All-Around and with 5 pair of clubs. In December she was called up for a national training camp.

The following year she competed, with a renewed group, at the Pan American Championships in Rio de Janeiro. There, along Leticia Rosa, Isabella Tenorio, Leona Torres and Melissa Varejão, she won gold in the All-Around.
