= Santino Mazzucchelli =

Argentine basketball player (born 2004)

Personal information
- Born: July 2, 2004 (age 22) Baradero, Argentina
- Listed height: 6 ft 7 in (2.01 m)

Career information
- Playing career: 2021–present
- Position: Power forward / Small forward

Career history
- 2021–present: Club Atlético Platense
Medals
Representing Argentina
Men's basketball
Junior Pan American Games
Gold medal – first place	Asuncion 2025	Men's 3x3

Santino Mazzucchelli (born July 2, 2004) is an Argentine professional basketball player for Club Atlético Platense of the Liga Nacional de Básquet (LNB), the top division of Argentine basketball. He also plays for the Argentine 3x3 team.

== Professional career ==
Both a small forward and a power forward, Mazzucchelli started playing basketball at Club Atlético Baradero in Baradero, Buenos Aires Province. Since 2021, he has played for Club Atlético Platense, in the Argentine League.

== National team career ==
Mazzucchelli competed internationally with the Argentina men's national 3x3 team at the 2025 Junior Pan American Games, having won the gold medal. He competed again in the 2025 FIBA 3x3 AmeriCup and the team ranked 7th.
