= Coralie Demers =

Canadian artistic gymnast (born 2010)

- Born: April 23, 2010 (age 16) LaSalle, Ontario, Canada

Gymnastics career
- Country represented: Canada; (2026–present)
Medal record
Women's artistic gymnastics
Representing Canada
Junior Pan American Games
Bronze medal – third place	2025 Asunción	Team
Bronze medal – third place	2025 Asunción	Vault
FIG World Cup
Event	1st	2nd	3rd
World Challenge Cup	0	0	1
Total	0	0	1

Coralie Demers (born April 23, 2010) is a Canadian artistic gymnast. She represented Canada at the 2026 World Championships.

== Junior gymnastics career ==
In August 2025, Demers competed at the 2025 Junior Pan American Games and won a bronze medal in the team event. She also won a bronze medal on vault with a score of 12.933 and placed sixth on balance beam with a score of 10.966.

On October 28, 2025, she was selected to represent Canada at the 2025 Junior World Artistic Gymnastics Championships.

She also claimed the all-around titles at both Elite Canada and the Canadian Championship. Following the season she was named the 2025 Junior Athlete of the Year by Gymnastics Canada.

== Senior gymnastics career ==
In May 2026, she made her senior international debut at the Varna Challenge Cup and won a bronze medal on uneven bars.

On September 28, 2026, she was named to the Canadian team for the 2026 World Championships. She was the youngest member of the Canadian team at the World Championships. Canada finished in eighth place in the team event.

== Competitive history ==
Competitive history of Coralie Demers at the junior level
Year	Event	Team	AA	VT	UB	BB	FX
2023	Elite Canada		3rd place, bronze medalist(s)	2nd place, silver medalist(s)	3rd place, bronze medalist(s)	2nd place, silver medalist(s)	3rd place, bronze medalist(s)
2023	Canadian Championships			3rd place, bronze medalist(s)		2nd place, silver medalist(s)	
2024	Elite Canada				2nd place, silver medalist(s)		
2024	City of Jesolo Trophy	3rd place, bronze medalist(s)					
2024	Canadian Championships				3rd place, bronze medalist(s)		
2025	Elite Canada		1st place, gold medalist(s)			1st place, gold medalist(s)	1st place, gold medalist(s)
2025	Canadian Championships		1st place, gold medalist(s)		1st place, gold medalist(s)	2nd place, silver medalist(s)	3rd place, bronze medalist(s)
2025	Junior Pan American Games	3rd place, bronze medalist(s)		3rd place, bronze medalist(s)			
2025	Junior World Championships		47	26	26	52	83

Competitive history of Coralie Demers at the senior level
Year	Event	Team	AA	VT	UB	BB	FX
2026	Varna Challenge Cup				3rd place, bronze medalist(s)		
2026	Canadian Championships				1st place, gold medalist(s)		
2026	World Championships	8					
