= 2025 Pan American Trampoline and Tumbling Championships =

Gymnastics competition

- Location: Santa Tecla, El Salvador
- Date: May 16, 2025–May 18, 2025

The 2025 Senior Pan American Trampoline and Tumbling Championships were held in Santa Tecla, El Salvador, from May 16 to 18, 2025. The competition was organized by the Peruvian Gymnastics Federation and approved by the International Gymnastics Federation.

== Medalists ==
Event	Gold	Silver	Bronze
Men
Individual trampoline	(United States) Ryan Maccagnan	(United States) Cody Gesuelli	(Brazil) Gabriel Sousa
Synchronized trampoline	(United States) Ryan Maccagnan (United States) Elijah Vogel	(Mexico) Saúl Zuñiga (Mexico) Johar Guevara	(Colombia) Diego Giraldo (Colombia) Manuel Sierra
Trampoline team	United States; Cody Gesuelli; Ryan Maccagnan; Elijah Vogel; Lourens Willekes	Mexico; Elías Carballo; Jorge García; Johar Guevara; Hugo Mata	Brazil; Wallace Celestino; Vinicius Celestino; Rayan Dutra; Gabriel Sousa
Double mini	(Argentina) Santiago Federico Ferrari	(Argentina) Agustin Messuti	(Ecuador) Joseph Solorzano
Women
Individual trampoline	(Brazil) Camilla Gomes	(Mexico) Dafne Navarro	(Colombia) Nicole Castellanos
Synchronized trampoline	(Mexico) Dafne Navarro (Mexico) Mariola García García	(Canada) Kalena Soehn (Canada) Gabriella Katharina Flynn	(Colombia) Nicole Castellanos (Colombia) Anny Sánchez
Trampoline team	Brazil; Camilla Gomes; Maria Luiza Marcante; Luara Rezende; Julia Rocha	United States; Faith Avery; Clare Bretscher; Leah Garafalo; Kennedi Roberts	Mexico; Mariola García; Aixa de León; Dafne Navarro; Patricia Nuñez
Double mini	Only one group, not awarded		

== Medal table ==
* Host nation (El Salvador)

Rank	Nation	Gold	Silver	Bronze	Total
1	United States	3	2	0	5
2	Brazil	2	0	2	4
3	Mexico	1	3	1	5
4	Argentina	1	1	0	2
5	Canada	0	1	0	1
6	Colombia	0	0	3	3
7	Ecuador	0	0	1	1
Totals (7 entries)		7	7	7	21
