= Jorman Álvarez =

Colombian gymnast

- Full name: Jorman Andrés Álvarez Delgado
- Born: 16 February 2007 (age 19) Cúcuta, Colombia

Gymnastics career
- Discipline: Men's artistic gymnastics
- Country represented: Colombia; (2023–present)
- Club: Liga Norte de Santander
- Head coach: Jairo Ruiz
- Assistant coach: Jossimar Calvo
Medal record
Representing Colombia
Men's artistic gymnastics
Pan American Championships
Silver medal – second place	2026 Rio de Janeiro	Team
Central American and Caribbean Games
Gold medal – first place	2026 Santo Domingo	Team
South American Games
Silver medal – second place	2026 Santa Fe	Team

Jorman Andrés Álvarez Delgado (born February 16, 2007) is a Colombian artistic gymnast. He was part of the silver medal-winning team at the 2026 Pan American Championships. Individually he is the 2025 Junior Pan American Games co-champion on parallel bars.

== Gymnastics career ==
In early 2024, Álvarez competed at the inaugural Bolivarian Youth Games, where he won gold on parallel bars. At the 2024 Junior Pan American Championships, he won silver with the team. Álvarez competed at the 2025 Junior Pan American Games where he helped Colombia win the silver medal as a team. Individually he co-won the parallel bars title alongside teammate Camilo Vera.

Álvarez began competing at the senior level in 2026. He competed at numerous World Cups, with his best placements being in Cairo and Osijek, where he finished eighth and seventh on the parallel bars respectively. At the 2026 Pan American Championships, Álvarez helped Colombia win the silver medal behind Canada. Individually, he finished eighth in the parallel bars final. Álvarez next competed at the 2026 Central American and Caribbean Games where he helped Colombia win team gold. At the 2026 South American Games, Álvarez helped Colombia win silver as a team.

At the 2026 World Championships, Álvarez helped Colombia qualify for their first team final in history where they ultimately finished eighth.

== Competitive history ==
Competitive history of Jorman Álvarez
Year	Event	Team	AA	FX	PH	SR	VT	PB	HB
2023	Colombian Championships		5						
2023	2nd Colombian Championships		6						
2024	Bolivarian Youth Games							1st place, gold medalist(s)	
2024	Colombian Championships		4						
2024	Junior Pan American Championships	2nd place, silver medalist(s)						8	
2025	Colombian Championships		2nd place, silver medalist(s)						
2025	Junior Pan American Games	2nd place, silver medalist(s)						1st place, gold medalist(s)	
2025	South American Junior Championships	1st place, gold medalist(s)	5	7		2nd place, silver medalist(s)		2nd place, silver medalist(s)	
2025	Junior World Championships	12							
2026	Cairo World Cup							8	
2026	Osijek World Cup							7	
2026	Colombian Championships		5		4	2nd place, silver medalist(s)		3rd place, bronze medalist(s)	3rd place, bronze medalist(s)
2026	Pan American Championships	2nd place, silver medalist(s)						8	
2026	Central American and Caribbean Games	1st place, gold medalist(s)							
2026	South American Games	2nd place, silver medalist(s)				7			
2026	World Championships	8							
