= 3x3 basketball at the 2025 Junior Pan American Games =

3x3 basketball at the 2025 Junior American Games
- Venue: Olympic Training Centre
- Start date: August 15, 2025
- End date: August 17, 2025
- No. of events: 2 (1 men, 1 women)
- Competitors: 96 from 15 nations

The 3x3 basketball tournaments at the 2025 Junior Pan American Games were held at the Olympic Training Centre, located in the Olympic Park in Luque, in the Greater Asuncion area. The events were contested between August 15 and 17, 2025.

Two tournaments were contested with twelve teams each. The winner of each event qualified for the 2027 Pan American Games in Lima, Peru.

== Qualification ==
Qualification for the games was based on the FIBA 3x3 rankings as of May 1, 2025.

=== Qualification summary ===
Event/Criteria	Quotas	Men	Women
Host nation	1	Paraguay	Paraguay
FIBA Rankings	11	Argentina; Brazil; Canada; Cayman Islands; Chile; Dominican Republic; Ecuador; El Salvador; Mexico; Puerto Rico; Trinidad and Tobago	Argentina; Brazil; Canada; Chile; Costa Rica; Ecuador; El Salvador; Guatemala; Mexico; Puerto Rico; Uruguay
Total	12	12	12

== Medal summary ==
=== Medal table ===
* Host nation (Paraguay)

Rank	Nation	Gold	Silver	Bronze	Total
1	Argentina	1	0	0	1
1	Canada	1	0	0	1
3	Chile	0	1	0	1
3	Mexico	0	1	0	1
5	Ecuador	0	0	1	1
5	Paraguay*	0	0	1	1
Totals (6 entries)		2	2	2	6

=== Medalists ===
Event	Gold	Silver	Bronze
Men's tournament	Argentina; Santino Mazzucchelli; Alejo Maggi; Juan Frontera; Martin Molina	Chile; Gabriel Soto; Juan Aguayo; Oscar Barría; Vicente Schulz	Ecuador; Kevin Pazmino; Andrés Jaramillo; Kevin Preciado; Michael Torres
Women's tournament	Canada; Marah Dykstra; Gage Grassick; Jade Belmore; Mackenzie Smith	Mexico; Anisa Jeffries; Loriette Maciel; Laura Plascencia; Regina Espinosa	Paraguay; Antonella Luraghi; Manuela Ramírez; Agostina Ochipinti; Ana Brítez

== Men's tournament ==
=== Preliminary round ===
==== Group A ====
Pos	Team	Pld	W	L	PF	PA	PD	Qualification
1	Chile	2	2	0	40	28	+12	Quarterfinals
2	Ecuador	2	1	1	38	30	+8	Quarterfinals
3	Trinidad and Tobago	2	0	2	22	42	−20	

Source: Report
Rules for classification: 1) Wins; 2) Head-to-head record; 3) Points scored.

15 August 2025
11:00

Report

Chile	19–17 (OT)	Ecuador
Pts: Barría 8		Pts: Preciado 7

Olympic Training Centre, Luque
Referees: Gonzalo Paz Chiapponi (URU) / María Fernanda Olivieri (ARG)

15 August 2025
17:00

Report

Trinidad and Tobago	11–21	Ecuador
Pts: Friday 5		Pts: Pazmino 9

Olympic Training Centre, Luque
Referees: Gonzalo Paz Chiapponi (URU) / Cynthia Pamela Nuñez (DOM)

16 August 2025
11:00

Report

Chile	21–11	Trinidad and Tobago
Pts: Barría 9		Pts: Fields, Friday 4

Olympic Training Centre, Luque
Referees: Gonzalo Paz Chiapponi (URU) / María Fernanda Olivieri (ARG)

==== Group B ====
Pos	Team	Pld	W	L	PF	PA	PD	Qualification
1	Argentina	2	2	0	42	14	+28	Quarterfinals
2	Dominican Republic	2	1	1	31	28	+3	Quarterfinals
3	El Salvador	2	0	2	11	42	−31	

Source: Report
Rules for classification: 1) Wins; 2) Head-to-head record; 3) Points scored.

15 August 2025
11:30

Report

Argentina	21–10	Dominican Republic
Pts: Mazzucchelli 8		Pts: De Los Santos 4

Olympic Training Centre, Luque
Referees: Sonia Maldonado (PUR) / Fernando Obreque (CHI)

15 August 2025
17:30

Report

El Salvador	7–21	Dominican Republic
Pts: Aviles 4		Pts: Puello 9

Olympic Training Centre, Luque
Referees: Sonia Maldonado (PUR) / Katiuska Marchant (CHI)

16 August 2025
11:30

Report

Argentina	21–4	El Salvador
Pts: Frontera 8		Pts: Sanchez 2

Olympic Training Centre, Luque
Referees: Cynthia Pamela Nuñez (DOM) / Fernando Obreque (CHI)

==== Group C ====
Pos	Team	Pld	W	L	PF	PA	PD	Qualification
1	Puerto Rico	2	2	0	41	37	+4	Quarterfinals
2	Canada	2	1	1	41	34	+7	Quarterfinals
3	Brazil	2	0	2	30	41	−11	

Source: Report
Rules for classification: 1) Wins; 2) Head-to-head record; 3) Points scored.

15 August 2025
13:00

Report

Puerto Rico	21–20	Canada
Pts: Tirado 10		Pts: Rhooms 8

Olympic Training Centre, Luque
Referees: Fernando Obreque (CHI) / Hélio Augusto Santos (BRA)

15 August 2025
19:20

Report

Brazil	13–21	Canada
Pts: Fernandes 8		Pts: Sam 8

Olympic Training Centre, Luque
Referees: Fernando Obreque (CHI) / Sonia Maldonado (PUR)

16 August 2025
13:00

Report

Puerto Rico	20–17	Brazil
Pts: Tirado 8		Pts: Fernandes 8

Olympic Training Centre, Luque
Referees: Fernando Obreque (CHI) / Gonzalo Paz Chiapponi (URU)

==== Group D ====
Pos	Team	Pld	W	L	PF	PA	PD	Qualification
1	Paraguay	2	2	0	40	22	+18	Quarterfinals
2	Cayman Islands	2	1	1	28	36	−8	Quarterfinals
3	Mexico	2	0	2	30	40	−10	

Source: Report
Rules for classification: 1) Wins; 2) Head-to-head record; 3) Points scored.

15 August 2025
13:30

Report

Cayman Islands	9–19	Paraguay
Pts: Lansdell 7		Pts: Montiel 9

Olympic Training Centre, Luque
Referees: Gonzalo Paz Chiapponi (URU) / Sonia Maldonado (PUR)

15 August 2025
19:50

Report

Mexico	13–21	Paraguay
Pts: Barea, Maciel 4		Pts: Ruiz Diaz 12

Olympic Training Centre, Luque
Referees: Gonzalo Paz Chiapponi (URU) / María Fernanda Olivieri (ARG)

16 August 2025
13:50

Report

Cayman Islands	19–17	Mexico
Pts: Lansdell 14		Pts: Moreno 7

Olympic Training Centre, Luque
Referees: Hélio Augusto Santos (BRA) / Sonia Maldonado (PUR)

=== Knockout round ===
Quarterfinals
Chile	21
Canada	16
Paraguay	14
Dominican Republic	16
Argentina	21
Cayman Islands	10
Puerto Rico	20
Ecuador	21

Semifinals
Chile	18
Dominican Republic	16
Argentina	21
Ecuador	14

Final
Chile	11
Argentina	21
Bronze medal match
Dominican Republic	16
Ecuador	21

=== Quarterfinals ===
16 August 2025
16:30

Report

Chile	21–16	Canada
Pts: Soto 8		Pts: Smid 6

Olympic Training Centre, Luque
Referees: Gonzalo Paz Chiapponi (URU) / Hélio Augusto Santos (BRA)

16 August 2025
17:30

Report

Paraguay	14–16	Dominican Republic
Pts: Ruiz Diaz 7		Pts: Puello 7

Olympic Training Centre, Luque
Referees: Fernando Obreque (CHI) / Sonia Maldonado (PUR)

16 August 2025
18:30

Report

Argentina	21–10	Cayman Islands
Pts: Frontera, Mazzucchelli 7		Pts: Lansdell 6

Olympic Training Centre, Luque
Referees: Gonzalo Paz Chiapponi (URU) / Sonia Maldonado (PUR)

16 August 2025
19:30

Report

Puerto Rico	20–21	Ecuador
Pts: Navarro 7		Pts: Pazmino 9

Olympic Training Centre, Luque
Referees: Gonzalo Paz Chiapponi (URU) / Fernando Obreque (CHI)

==== 5–8th place semifinals ====
17 August 2025
10:30

Report

Cayman Islands	14–21	Puerto Rico
Pts: Lansdell 8		Pts: Martinez 10

Olympic Training Centre, Luque
Referees: María Fernanda Olivieri (ARG) / Fernando Obreque (CHI)

17 August 2025
11:30

Report

Canada	21–11	Paraguay
Pts: Smid 8		Pts: Medina 5

Olympic Training Centre, Luque
Referees: Fernando Obreque (CHI) / Sonia Maldonado (PUR)

=== Semifinals ===
17 August 2025
12:30

Report

Chile	18–16	Dominican Republic
Pts: Aguayo, Soto 5		Pts: De Los Santos 6

Olympic Training Centre, Luque
Referees: Gonzalo Paz Chiapponi (URU) / Sonia Maldonado (PUR)

17 August 2025
13:30

Report

Argentina	21–14	Ecuador
Pts: Molina 6		Pts: Pazmino 6

Olympic Training Centre, Luque
Referees: Gonzalo Paz Chiapponi (URU) / Fernando Obreque (CHI)

=== Seventh place game ===
17 August 2025
16:30

Report

Cayman Islands	12–16	Paraguay
Pts: Hurlston-Anderson 8		Pts: Ruiz Diaz 7

Olympic Training Centre, Luque
Referees: Fernando Obreque (CHI) / María Fernanda Olivieri (ARG)

=== Fifth place game ===
17 August 2025
17:30

Report

Puerto Rico	20–19 (OT)	Canada
Pts: Tirado 7		Pts: Smid 7

Olympic Training Centre, Luque
Referees: Fernando Obreque (CHI) / Gonzalo Paz Chiapponi (URU)

=== Bronze medal game ===
17 August 2025
18:50

Report

Dominican Republic	16–21	Ecuador
Pts: Abad, De Los Santos 6		Pts: Preciado 8

Olympic Training Centre, Luque
Referees: Hélio Augusto Santos (BRA) / Gonzalo Paz Chiapponi (URU)

=== Gold medal game ===
17 August 2025
19:50

Report

Chile	11–21	Argentina
Pts: Schulz 8		Pts: Frontera, Molina 7

Olympic Training Centre, Luque
Referees: Sonia Maldonado (PUR) / Gonzalo Paz Chiapponi (URU)

== Women's tournament ==
=== Preliminary round ===
==== Group A ====
Pos	Team	Pld	W	L	PF	PA	PD	Qualification
1	Chile	2	2	0	39	21	+18	Quarterfinals
2	Uruguay	2	1	1	32	24	+8	Quarterfinals
3	El Salvador	2	0	2	11	37	−26	

Source: Report
Rules for classification: 1) Wins; 2) Head-to-head record; 3) Points scored.

15 August 2025
10:00

Report

Chile	20–14	Uruguay
Pts: Ovalle 12		Pts: Herrera 6

Olympic Training Centre, Luque
Referees: Sonia Maldonado (PUR) / Hélio Augusto Santos (BRA)

15 August 2025
16:00

Report

El Salvador	4–18	Uruguay
Pts: Medina, Morales 2		Pts: Herrera 6

Olympic Training Centre, Luque
Referees: Cynthia Pamela Nuñez (DOM) / María Fernanda Olivieri (ARG)

16 August 2025
10:00

Report

Chile	19–7	El Salvador
Pts: Ovalle 10		Pts: Vides 4

Olympic Training Centre, Luque
Referees: María Fernanda Olivieri (ARG) / Cynthia Pamela Nuñez (DOM)

==== Group B ====
Pos	Team	Pld	W	L	PF	PA	PD	Qualification
1	Argentina	2	1	1	28	26	+2	Quarterfinals
2	Costa Rica	2	1	1	26	27	−1	Quarterfinals
3	Ecuador	2	1	1	23	24	−1	

Source: Report
Rules for classification: 1) Wins; 2) Head-to-head record; 3) Points scored.

15 August 2025
10:30

Report

Argentina	17–13	Costa Rica
Pts: Gentinetta 7		Pts: Araya, Fernandez 4

Olympic Training Centre, Luque
Referees: Cynthia Pamela Nuñez (DOM) / Katiuska Marchant (CHI)

15 August 2025
16:30

Report

Ecuador	10–13	Costa Rica
Pts: Valencia 4		Pts: Alfaro 6

Olympic Training Centre, Luque
Referees: Fernando Obreque (CHI) / Katiuska Marchant (CHI)

16 August 2025
10:30

Report

Argentina	11–13	Ecuador
Pts: Buzzetti 6		Pts: Valencia 6

Olympic Training Centre, Luque
Referees: Hélio Augusto Santos (BRA) / Katiuska Marchant (CHI)

==== Group C ====
Pos	Team	Pld	W	L	PF	PA	PD	Qualification
1	Mexico	2	2	0	36	18	+18	Quarterfinals
2	Brazil	2	1	1	35	23	+12	Quarterfinals
3	Guatemala	2	0	2	12	42	−30	

Source: Report
Rules for classification: 1) Wins; 2) Head-to-head record; 3) Points scored.

15 August 2025
12:00

Report

Mexico	21–4	Guatemala
Pts: Espinosa 10		Pts: Aranki 2

Olympic Training Centre, Luque
Referees: Hélio Augusto Santos (BRA) / Cynthia Pamela Nuñez (DOM)

15 August 2025
18:00

Report

Brazil	21–8	Guatemala
Pts: Moura 9		Pts: Escobar 3

Olympic Training Centre, Luque
Referees: Fernando Obreque (CHI) / María Fernanda Olivieri (ARG)

16 August 2025
12:00

Report

Mexico	15–14	Brazil
Pts: Jeffries 7		Pts: Moura 6

Olympic Training Centre, Luque
Referees: Sonia Maldonado (PUR) / Katiuska Marchant (CHI)

==== Group D ====
Pos	Team	Pld	W	L	PF	PA	PD	Qualification
1	Canada	2	1	1	29	23	+6	Quarterfinals
2	Paraguay	2	1	1	28	29	−1	Quarterfinals
3	Puerto Rico	2	1	1	24	29	−5	

Source: Report
Rules for classification: 1) Wins; 2) Head-to-head record; 3) Points scored.

15 August 2025
12:30

Report

Puerto Rico	16–13	Paraguay
Pts: Z. González 7		Pts: Brítez 6

Olympic Training Centre, Luque
Referees: María Fernanda Olivieri (ARG) / Katiuska Marchant (CHI)

15 August 2025
18:30

Report

Canada	13–15	Paraguay
Pts: Smith 7		Pts: Brítez, Luraghi 7

Olympic Training Centre, Luque
Referees: Cynthia Pamela Nuñez (DOM) / Katiuska Marchant (CHI)

16 August 2025
12:30

Report

Puerto Rico	8–16	Canada
Pts: A. González 5		Pts: Belmore 7

Olympic Training Centre, Luque
Referees: María Fernanda Olivieri (ARG) / Cynthia Pamela Nuñez (DOM)

=== Knockout round ===
Quarterfinals
Chile	18
Brazil (OT)	19
Canada	21
Costa Rica	6
Argentina	15
Paraguay	17
Mexico	21
Uruguay	8

Semifinals
Brazil	10
Canada	13
Paraguay	8
Mexico	14

Final
Canada	18
Mexico	13
Bronze medal match
Brazil	15
Paraguay (OT)	16

=== Quarterfinals ===
16 August 2025
16:00

Report

Chile	18–19 (OT)	Brazil
Pts: Ovalle 13		Pts: Moura 8

Olympic Training Centre, Luque
Referees: Sonia Maldonado (PUR) / Cynthia Pamela Nuñez (DOM)

16 August 2025
17:00

Report

Canada	21–6	Costa Rica
Pts: Grassick 9		Pts: Fernandez 3

Olympic Training Centre, Luque
Referees: María Fernanda Olivieri (ARG) / Katiuska Marchant (CHI)

16 August 2025
18:00

Report

Argentina	15–17	Paraguay
Pts: Buzzetti, Gentinetta 7		Pts: Luraghi 12

Olympic Training Centre, Luque
Referees: Cynthia Pamela Nuñez (DOM) / Hélio Augusto Santos (BRA)

16 August 2025
19:00

Report

Mexico	21–8	Uruguay
Pts: Maciel 9		Pts: Cordara 4

Olympic Training Centre, Luque
Referees: Katiuska Marchant (CHI) / María Fernanda Olivieri (ARG)

==== 5–8th place semifinals ====
17 August 2025
10:00

Report

Argentina	17–7	Uruguay
Pts: Gentinetta 13		Pts: Kirschenbaum 5

Olympic Training Centre, Luque
Referees: Cynthia Pamela Nuñez (DOM) / Katiuska Marchant (CHI)

17 August 2025
11:00

Report

Chile	15–8	Costa Rica
Pts: Ovalle 6		Pts: Araya 3

Olympic Training Centre, Luque
Referees: Hélio Augusto Santos (BRA) / Cynthia Pamela Nuñez (DOM)

=== Semifinals ===
17 August 2025
12:00

Report

Brazil	10–13	Canada
Pts: Moura 4		Pts: Smith 5

Olympic Training Centre, Luque
Referees: Katiuska Marchant (CHI) / María Fernanda Olivieri (ARG)

17 August 2025
13:00

Report

Paraguay	8–14	Mexico
Pts: Brítez 3		Pts: Jeffries 7

Olympic Training Centre, Luque
Referees: Hélio Augusto Santos (BRA) / Cynthia Pamela Nuñez (DOM)

=== Seventh place game ===
17 August 2025
16:00

Report

Uruguay	13–10	Costa Rica
Pts: Kirschenbaum 6		Pts: Fernandez 6

Olympic Training Centre, Luque
Referees: Katiuska Marchant (CHI) / Cynthia Pamela Nuñez (DOM)

=== Fifth place game ===
17 August 2025
17:00

Report

Argentina	13–17	Chile
Pts: Buzzetti, Maggi 5		Pts: Ovalle 10

Olympic Training Centre, Luque
Referees: Hélio Augusto Santos (BRA) / Sonia Maldonado (PUR)

=== Bronze medal game ===
17 August 2025
18:20

Report

Brazil	15–16 (OT)	Paraguay
Pts: Francisco 7		Pts: Brítez 10

Olympic Training Centre, Luque
Referees: Sonia Maldonado (PUR) / Cynthia Pamela Nuñez (DOM)

=== Gold medal game ===
17 August 2025
19:20

Report

Canada	18–13	Mexico
Pts: Grassick 11		Pts: Jeffries 7

Olympic Training Centre, Luque
Referees: Fernando Obreque (CHI) / María Fernanda Olivieri (ARG)
