= Gage Grassick =

Canadian basketball player

Saskatchewan Huskies
- Position: Guard
- League: U Sports

Personal information
- Born: Prince Albert, Saskatchewan
- Listed height: 5 ft 8 in (1.73 m)

Career information
- High school: Carlton Comprehensive
- College: Saskatchewan Huskies
- Playing career: 2020–present
- Number: 5

Career highlights
- (U Sports Player of the Year 2024-25)
Medals
Representing Canada
Women's basketball
Junior Pan American Games
Gold medal – first place	Asuncion 2025	Women's 3x3

Gage Sierra Grassick (born 30 September 2002) is a Canadian basketball player who plays for the Saskatchewan Huskies.

== Early life ==
Grassick was raised on a farm outside of Prince Albert, Saskatchewan, and at first played and practiced basketball on grass on her family's farm. She attended and played her high school basketball for Carlton Comprehensive.

== University career ==
Grassick joined the University of Saskatchewan Huskies in 2020, though her first season with the team was cancelled due to the COVID-19 pandemic.

=== 2021–22 season ===
Grassick was part of the Huskies team which won the Canada West championship in the 2021–22 season, beating the Winnipeg Wesmen 68-59.

=== 2023–24 season ===
In the 2023–24 season, Grassick was part of the team which won the Canada West conference. She scored 30 points in the national championship final as the Huskies lost 70-67 against the Carleton Ravens. She was named a Canada West First Team All-Star for the 2023–24 season.

=== 2024–25 season ===
On November 12, 2024, in the Huskies' season opener, Grassick became the first Saskatchewan-born woman in U Sports history to record a triple double. In the 2024–25 season she set the single-season program record for assists (120). On March 16, 2025, Grassick played in the Huskies' 85-66 victory over the Carleton Ravens in the 2025 championship final, as she led the team with 35 points. Her individual performance earned particular praise, and she was named the championship MVP. Describing the spirit of her championship-winning team, she said “We’re just so capable. We push each other and support each other, and that's what makes the difference. It's a team of athletes who want to make an impact not only in the national game, but in our communities too.”

On March 12, 2025, Grassick won the Nan Copp trophy, being named as the 2025 U Sports Women's Basketball player of the season, the third Huskie in program history to win the award. In June 2025, Grassick was named as the winner of the Lois and Doug Mitchell Athlete of the Year award, the highest achievement for an athlete in U Sports, becoming the first woman athlete from the University of Saskatchewan to be named as the best athlete from across U Sports for the year. She also won the Mary Ethel Cartwright Trophy as the Most Outstanding Female Athlete at the University of Saskatchewan for that year. Speaking about Grassick's performance across the 2024–25 season, Huskies head coach Lisa Thomaidas said “Gage was absolutely unbelievable. She showed why she was MVP of the country this year and, each game, she was just the best player on the court.”

=== 2025–26 season ===
Grassick was part of the team which achieved a perfect 2025–26 regular season, their second in program history (the other being the 1971–72 season), on February 7, 2026, following a 84-54 win over the Winnipeg Wesmen which also extended the Huskies overall win streak to 50 games. She averaged 15.8 points and 5.4 assists per game during the regular season, earning her a third-consecutive selection to the Canada West All-Star first team. She was ranked 6th overall in Canada West for points scored during the regular season. She was part of the team which lost 61-58 to the Calgary Dinos in the Canada West playoff semifinal on February 21, 2026, which marked the end of the Huskies' stretch of 51 consecutive wins. She was named the Canada West women’s basketball player of the year for the second consecutive season, becoming the second player in Huskies history to attain the achievement, after Sarah Crooks. The Huskies qualified for the 2026 national championship as the wild card entry, with Grassick playing in the semifinal as the Huskies defeated the Laval Rouge et Or by 55-43 to advance to the 2026 championship final. Grassick scored 16 points in the final as the Huskies beat University of New Brunswick Reds by 77-68 to win their second consecutive national championship in what was Grassick's final game for the team. Grassick was named as a 2026 tournament all-star. She won the University of Saskatchewan's Mary Ethel Cartwright Trophy (Female Athlete of the Year award) for the second year in a row, becoming the ninth athlete in the university's history to win the award twice, as well as winning that season's Valerie Girsberger Trophy (Female All-Around Athlete award).

Grassick finished her university career holding the Huskies' program record for steals (290) as well as being ranked in the top six in games played (114), points (1,572), assists (486), rebounds (643), as well as minutes played (3,457). Speaking after her final game with the team in the 2026 national final, Grassick said she was considering coaching following her playing career, and that her time with the Huskies "shaped who I am today. It's shaped what I want to do in the community. It shaped what I want to do in the future and how I want to uphold myself". After completing a degree in kinesiology, Grassick began studies at the College of Pharmacy at the University of Saskatchewan.

== International career ==
On July 19, 2025, Grassick was named to the Canadian roster for the FIBA U23 3x3 Nations League 2025 – Americas 2 competition. Grassick was fourth in the tournament's scoring as Canada finished third in their conference, being named Canada Basketball player of the week for July 21–27.

On August 17, 2025, Grassick was part of the Canada 3x3 team which beat Mexico 18-13 to win gold in the 2025 Junior Pan American Games in Luque, Paraguay.

== Awards and honours ==
- U Sports Champion: 2024-25, 2025-26
- U Sports Silver Medalist: 2023-24
- Nan Copp Trophy: 2024-25
- Lois and Doug Mitchell Athlete of the Year (U Sports Player of the year): 2024-25
- U Sports Final 8 Tournament MVP: 2024-25
- U Sports First Team All-Canadian: 2024-25
- U Sports Second Team All-Canadian: 2023-24
- U Sports Final 8 Tournament All-Star: 2023-24, 2024-25, 2024-25
- Canada West women’s basketball player of the year: 2024-25, 2025-26
- Mary Ethel Cartwright Trophy: 2024-25, 2025-26
- Valerie Girsberger Trophy: 2025-26
- Prince Albert Female Athlete of the Year: 2023
- U Sports Academic All-Canadian (2020-2021, 2021-2022, 2023–24)
