= Squash at the 2021 Junior Pan American Games =

- Squash pictogram
- Venue: Club Campestre de Cali
- Dates: 26 November–1 December
- Competitors: 57 from 17 nations

Squash competitions at the 2021 Junior Pan American Games in Cali, Colombia were held from 26 November to 1 December 2021.

== Medal summary ==
=== Medal table ===
* Host nation (Colombia)

Rank	Nation	Gold	Silver	Bronze	Total
1	Mexico	4	3	0	7
2	United States	2	0	0	2
3	Colombia*	1	4	1	6
4	Argentina	0	0	4	4
4	Ecuador	0	0	4	4
6	Brazil	0	0	2	2
6	Guatemala	0	0	2	2
8	Canada	0	0	1	1
Totals (8 entries)		7	7	14	28

== Medalists ==
Event	Gold	Silver	Bronze
Men's singles	Leonel Cárdenas; Mexico	Matías Knudsen; Colombia	Junior Alejandro Franco; Guatemala
Men's singles	Leonel Cárdenas; Mexico	Matías Knudsen; Colombia	Miguel Pujol; Argentina
Men's doubles	Colombia; Juan José Torres; Matías Knudsen	Mexico; Juan Sebastian Salazar; Leonardo Vargas	Argentina; Jeremias Azaña; Miguel Pujol
Men's doubles	Colombia; Juan José Torres; Matías Knudsen	Mexico; Juan Sebastian Salazar; Leonardo Vargas	Brazil; Gabriel Garcia Pederiva; Rhuan Neves de Sousa
Men's team	Mexico; Juan Sebastian Salazar; Leonardo Vargas; Leonel Cárdenas	Colombia; Juan José Torres; Matías Knudsen; Nicolás Serna	Argentina; Jeremias Azaña; Lisandro Ortiz; Miguel Pujol
Men's team	Mexico; Juan Sebastian Salazar; Leonardo Vargas; Leonel Cárdenas	Colombia; Juan José Torres; Matías Knudsen; Nicolás Serna	Brazil; Gabriel Garcia Pederiva; Rhuan Neves de Sousa; Yuri Pelbart
Women's singles	Marina Stefanoni; United States	Dina Anguiano; Mexico	María Moya; Ecuador
Women's singles	Marina Stefanoni; United States	Dina Anguiano; Mexico	Lucía Bautista; Colombia
Women's doubles	Mexico; Fabiola Cabello; Paola Franco	Colombia; María clara Velasquez; Valentina Sierra	Guatemala; Darlyn Sandoval; María Pinot
Women's doubles	Mexico; Fabiola Cabello; Paola Franco	Colombia; María clara Velasquez; Valentina Sierra	Ecuador; María Buenaño; María Falconí
Women's team	United States; Lucie Stefanoni; Marina Stefanoni; Serena Daniel	Mexico; Dina Soledad Anguiano; Fabiola Cabello; Paola Franco	Ecuador; María Buenaño; María Falconí; María Moya
Women's team	United States; Lucie Stefanoni; Marina Stefanoni; Serena Daniel	Mexico; Dina Soledad Anguiano; Fabiola Cabello; Paola Franco	Canada; Hannah Blatt; Iman Shaheen; Sydney Elizabeth Maxwell
Mixed doubles	Mexico; Dina Soledad Anguiano; Leonel Cárdenas	Colombia; Lucía Bautista; Nicolás Serna	Ecuador; David Costales; María Moya
Mixed doubles	Mexico; Dina Soledad Anguiano; Leonel Cárdenas	Colombia; Lucía Bautista; Nicolás Serna	Argentina; Lisandro Ortiz; Valentina Portieri
