= Aurora Sullivan =

American rhythmic gymnast

- Born: June 25, 2010 (age 16) Los Angeles

Gymnastics career
- Discipline: Rhythmic gymnastics
- Country represented: United States; (2023–present)
- Club: Burlo Gymnastics
- Head coach: Kamelia Dunavska
- Assistant coach: Margarita Mamzina
Medal record
Representing United States
Rhythmic gymnastics
Pan American Championships
Silver medal – second place	2026 Rio de Janeiro	Group All-Around
Silver medal – second place	2026 Rio de Janeiro	5 Balls
Junior Pan American Championships
Silver medal – second place	2024 Guatemala City	5 Hoops
Bronze medal – third place	2024 Guatemala City	Group All-Around
Bronze medal – third place	2024 Guatemala City	10 Clubs

Aurora Sullivan (born June 25, 2010) is an American rhythmic gymnast. She represents the United States in international competitions as a member of the national group.

== Career ==
=== Junior ===
Sullivan took 30th place at the 2023 Elite Qualifier. In May 2024 she made her international debut at the Portimão International Tournament, being 10th in the All-Around, 19th with hoop, 7th with ball, 9th with clubs and 11th with ribbon. The following year she was integrated into the national junior group and competed in the Pan American Championships in Guatemala City alongside Claire Glukovsky, Sasha Kuliyev, Joy Lee, Katerina Levit and Natalia Serobian, winning silver with 5 hoops and bronze in both the All-Around and with 10 clubs.

In February 2025 she won silver, behind Anna Filipp, at the Rhythmic Invitational. In May she took part in the Portimão International Tournament, winning silver in teams along Josephine Weber. The next month she was included into the American national junior team. In June she was 7th at the USA National Championships, winning gold with clubs.

=== Senior ===
She became age eligible for senior competitions in 2026, being included into the roster of the national senior group. Debuting at the Miss Valentine Grand Prix in Tartu where, as a member of USA Group A along Greta Pavilonyte, Kalina Trayanov, Natalia Ye-Granda, Goda Balsys and Kristina Lee, she was 4th overall and won silver with 3 hoops & 4 clubs. In March she took part in the World Cup in Sofia, being 14th in the All-Around, 8th with 5 balls and 20th with 3 hoops & 4 clubs. In Tashkent team USA was 9th in the All-Around and 6th in the mixed apparatus final. A month later she participated in the stage in Portimão, being 7th in the All-Around, 8th with 5 balls and 4th with 3 hoops & 4 clubs. In June she was selected for the Pan American Championships in Rio de Janeiro, winning silver in the All-Around.
