= Gisely Benevenuto =

Brazilian rhythmic gymnast

- Full name: Gisely Bastos Benevenuto
- Born: 28 July 2011 (age 15)

Gymnastics career
- Discipline: Rhythmic gymnastics
- Country represented: Brazil; (2025–present)
- Club: Instituto Capixaba Esportivo
- Head coach: Gizela Batista
Medal record
Rhythmic gymnastics
Representing Brazil
Junior South American Championships
Gold medal – first place	2025 Posadas	Age Group Team
Gold medal – first place	2025 Posadas	Age Group All-Around
Gold medal – first place	2025 Posadas	Age Group Hoop
Gold medal – first place	2025 Posadas	Age Group Ball
Gold medal – first place	2025 Posadas	Age Group Clubs
Gold medal – first place	2026 Medellín	Team
Gold medal – first place	2026 Medellín	Clubs

Gisely Bastos Benevenuto (born July 28 2011) is a Brazilian rhythmic gymnast. She represents Brazil in international competitions.

== Career ==
In December 2024 Benevenuto won three silver medals in the pre-junior category of the Brazilian Group Championships, alongside Agatha Monteiro, Amanda Manente, Esther Brunow and Sophia Louback. As an individual she won bronze with ball at nationals.

=== Junior ===
She became a junior in 2025, in September she took gold with hoop and bronze in the All-Around at the Brazilian Championships. The following month she was selected for the Junior South American Championships in Posadas, Misiones, where she won gold in teams, the All-Around, with hoop, with ball and with clubs in the AC4 (14 years old) category. In December she was called up for a national training stage for junior gymnasts.

In 2026 she won bronze in teams at nationals. In October she won bronze with hoop and with clubs, as well as gold overall in the Youth Games. She was then called up for the Junior South American Championships, winning gold in teams, with Amanda Manente, Mariana Sartori and Beatriz Vieira, and in the clubs final.
