= Kristina Lee =

American rhythmic gymnast

- Born: July 23, 2008 (age 18)

Gymnastics career
- Discipline: Rhythmic gymnastics
- Country represented: United States; (2022–present)
- Club: North Shore Rhythmic Gymnastics Center
- Head coach: Kamelia Dunavska
- Assistant coach: Margarita Mamzina
Medal record
Representing United States
Rhythmic gymnastics
Event	1st	2nd	3rd
FIG World Cup	0	1	1
Total	0	1	1
Pan American Championships
Silver medal – second place	2026 Rio de Janeiro	Group All-Around
Silver medal – second place	2026 Rio de Janeiro	5 Balls
Junior Pan American Championships
Silver medal – second place	2023 Guadalajara	Group All-Around
Silver medal – second place	2023 Guadalajara	5 Balls
Bronze medal – third place	2022 Rio de Janeiro	Group All-Around
Bronze medal – third place	2022 Rio de Janeiro	5 Ropes
Bronze medal – third place	2022 Rio de Janeiro	5 Balls
Silver medal – second place	2023 Guadalajara	5 Ropes

Kristina Lee (born July 23, 2008) is an American rhythmic gymnast. She represents the United States in international competitions as a member of the national group.

== Career ==
=== Junior ===
In 2022 Lee integrated into the national junior group, she subsequently competed in the Pan American Championships where she won three bronze medals in the All-Around and in the two event finals along Kalina Trayanov, Annabella Hantov, Isabelle Novoseltsky and Goda Balsys.

In 2023 she made her seasonal debut at the Gymnastik International in Schmiden, taking 5th place with 5 balls. In April she took part in the Sofia International Tournament being 11th overall. At the Portimão International Tournament they won bronze with 5 ropes and silver in the All-Around and with 5 balls. In June she competed at the Pan American Championships in Guadalajara (along Annabella Hantov, Goda Balsys, Greta Pavilonyte and Alaini Spata) winning bronze with 5 ropes and silver in the All-Around and with 5 balls. At the 2nd Junior World Championships in Sofia the group took 22nd place in the All-Around, 23rd with 5 ropes, 20th with 5 balls and 11th in teams.

=== Senior ===
She became age eligible for senior competitions in 2024, after the members of the previous group retired, she was called up to form the new senior group under the orders of Kamelia Dunavska and Margarita Mamzina.

The new group made its debut at the Friendship Cup in Alkmaar, winning gold overall. At the World Cup in Sofia they finished 10th overall, 12th with 3 balls & 2 hoops and 8th with ribbons. In Baku they were 11th in the All-Around, 13th with 5 ribbons and 9th in the mixed event. At the Portimão World Challenge Cup they were 5th overall, winning bronze with 5 ribbons and silver with 3 balls & 2 hoops.

She was confirmed into the group in 2026, first competing at the Miss Valentine Grand Prix in Tartu where, as a member of USA Group A along Greta Pavilonyte, Kalina Trayanov, Natalia Ye-Granda, Goda Balsys and Aurora Sullivan, she was 4th overall and won silver with 3 hoops & 4 clubs. In March she took part in the World Cup in Sofia, being 14th in the All-Around, 8th with 5 balls and 20th with 3 hoops & 4 clubs. In Tashkent team USA was 9th in the All-Around and 6th in the mixed apparatus' final. A month later she participated in the stage in Portimão, being 7th in the All-Around, 8th with 5 balls and 4th with 3 hoops & 4 clubs. In June she was selected for the Pan American Championships in Rio de Janeiro, winning silver in the All-Around.
