= Júlia Lorenzatto =

Brazilian rhythmic gymnast (born 2011)

Julia Lorenzatto
- Full name: Julia Valentina dos Santos Lorenzatto
- Born: 15 December 2012 (age 13) Marechal Cândido Rondon

Gymnastics career
- Discipline: Rhythmic gymnastics
- Country represented: Brazil; (2025–present)
- Club: Associação de Ginástica de Toledo
- Head coach: Yasmin Verissimo
- Assistant coach: Mayana Francisco
- Former coach: Gracieli Morais
Medal record
Rhythmic gymnastics
Representing Brazil
Junior Pan American Championships
Silver medal – second place	2025 Asunción	Age Group Clubs
Bronze medal – third place	2025 Asunción	Age Group Ball
Junior South American Championships
Gold medal – first place	2026 Medellín	Group All-Around
Gold medal – first place	2026 Medellín	5 Balls
Gold medal – first place	2026 Medellín	5 Ribbons

Julia Valentina dos Santos Lorenzatto (born 15 December 2012) is a Brazilian rhythmic gymnast. She represents Brazil in international competitions.

== Career ==
In 2023 Lorenzatto became the national champion among 11 years old. The following year she took silver overall and gold with ribbon at the 2024 Brazilian Championships. At the South American Championships in Aracaju she won gold in the All-Around, in free-hands, with hoop, in teams and in the overall team.

In 2025 she competed in the age group category of the Pan American Championships in Asunción. There she was 4th in teams, along Melissa Varejão, and won silver with clubs and bronze with ball. In October she became the national champion among gymnasts born in 2012. The following month she won three gold medals (team, overall team and clubs) at the Junior South American Championships in Posadas, Misiones. In December she was called up for a national training camp.

=== Junior ===
Entering the junior category in 2026, in August she was called up for the new Brazilian junior group selection. In September she was incorporated into the new national junior group made of her, Ana Clara Ravazio, Ana Laura Signori, Anita Grandi, Cecília Pufal, Melissa Varejão, Laura Silva and Rafaela Godoy, under the guidance of Yasmin Verissimo and Mayana Francisco. She was also called up for the upcoming Junior South American Championships in Medellín.
