= Catalina Neri =

Argentine rhythmic gymnast

- Born: 4 April 2011 (age 15) Buenos Aires

Gymnastics career
- Discipline: Rhythmic gymnastics
- Country represented: Argentina; (2022–present)
- Head coach: Camila Quintans
Medal record
Rhythmic gymnastics
Representing Argentina
South American Championships
Gold medal – first place	2024 Santiago	Age Group Team
Gold medal – first place	2024 Santiago	Age Group Hoop
Gold medal – first place	2024 Santiago	Age Group Ball
Junior South American Championships
Silver medal – second place	2024 Aracaju	Team
Silver medal – second place	2024 Aracaju	Hoop
Bronze medal – third place	2025 Posadas	Team
Bronze medal – third place	2026 Medellín	Team

Catalina Neri (born 4 April 2011) is an Argentinian rhythmic gymnast. She represents Argentina in international competitions.

== Biography ==
Neri took up the sport at age four. In July 2022 she won bronze in the All-Around, with hoop and with ribbon at the Metropolitan Tournament. In early September she was selected for the South American Championships, being 7th in the All-Around. The following year she took 4th place overall, winning silver with ribbon and bronze with hoop at the Misiones regional championships.

In June 2024 she took part in the Pan American Championships in Guatemala City, being 9th in the All-Around, 4th with hoop and 5th with ball in the age group category. In November she competed at the South American Cup, winning gold in team (along Martina Peralta) and with hoop and ball. A month later she won silver in team (with Clara Marzo and Martina Tolosa) and with hoop behind Beatriz Vieira, at the Junior South American Championships.

=== Junior ===
Neri became a junior in 2025. Selected for the Junior Pan American Championships in Asunción she took 4th place in team (with Emma Ceballos and Martina Tolosa) and 10th overall. Then she was named to represent Argentina at the 3rd Junior World Championships in Sofia. There she was 44th with hoop and 60th with ball. In August she participated in the Junior Pan American Games, being 10th in the All-Around and 8th in the hoop final. In late October and early November she competed in the South American Championships in Posadas, winning bronze in teams (alongside Martina Tolosa, Emma Ceballos and Clara Squillari).
