= Emma Ceballos =

Argentine rhythmic gymnast

- Born: 22 June 2010 (age 16) Cordoba, Argentina

Gymnastics career
- Discipline: Rhythmic gymnastics
- Country represented: Argentina (2023–present)
- Head coach: Vanina Lorefice
Medal record
Rhythmic gymnastics
Representing Argentina
South American Gymnastics Championships
Bronze medal – third place	2026 Asunción	All-Around Team
Junior South American Championships
Silver medal – second place	2025 Posadas	Hoop
Bronze medal – third place	2023 Asunción	Age Group Team
Bronze medal – third place	2023 Asunción	Age Group All-Around
Bronze medal – third place	2024 Aracaju	Team
Bronze medal – third place	2024 Aracaju	Clubs
Bronze medal – third place	2025 Posadas	Team
Bronze medal – third place	2025 Posadas	Ribbon

Emma Ceballos Rapi (born 22 June 2010) is an Argentinian rhythmic gymnast. She represents Argentina in international competitions.

== Biography ==
Ceballos took up the sport at age 4 at the Gimnasio Poeta Lugones under Julieta Groba. She made her international debut at the 2023 South American Championships in Asunción, there she won bronze in teams (along Paz Terreno and Federica Barria) and in the All-Around in the age group category.

=== Junior ===
In June 2024 she competed in the Pan American Championships in Guatemala City, being 7th in teams (with Livia Bustos, Clara Squillari and Olivia Paez) and 16th overall. In December she took part in the Junior South American Championships, winning bronze in teams and with clubs.

In 2025 she participated in the Pan American Championships being 5th in teams and 17th in the All-Around. In June she was selected to represent Argentina at the Junior World Championships in Sofia, the first time the country took part in that event, along Catalina Neri. Competing with clubs and ribbon she took 56th and 54th place respectively. In August she participated in the Junior Pan American Games, being 11th overall. In late October and early November she competed in the South American Championships in Posadas, winning bronze in teams (alongside Martina Tolosa, Catalina Neri and Clara Squillari) and with ribbon as well as silver with hoop.

=== Senior ===
Ceballos became age-eligible for senior competitions in 2026.
