= 2026 Pan American Rhythmic Gymnastics Championships =

International sports competition

- Venue: Carioca Arena 1
- Location: Rio de Janeiro, Brazil
- Start date: May 31 to June 2, 2026 (juniors); June 5 to 7, 2026 (seniors)

The 2026 Pan American Rhythmic Gymnastics Championships were held in Rio de Janeiro, Brazil, from May 31 to June 2 for juniors and from June 5 to 7, 2026 for seniors. The competition was organized by the Brazilian Gymnastics Federation and approved by World Gymnastics.

== Participating countries ==
- Argentina
- Aruba
- Bolivia
- Brazil
- Canada
- Chile
- Colombia
- Costa Rica
- Cuba
- El Salvador
- Ecuador
- United States
- Guatemala
- Mexico
- Paraguay
- Peru
- Puerto Rico
- Dominican Republic
- Venezuela

== Competition schedule ==
=== Juniors ===
- Sunday, May 31
  - 09:30 - 10:40 Age group tournament qualification (Hoop and Ball)
  - 11:00 - 12:45 Junior Individuals qualification - Group A (Hoop and Ball)
  - 15:00 - 16:45 Junior Individuals qualification - Group B (Hoop and Ball)
  - 18:00 - 18:30 Junior Groups qualification (5 Balls)
- Monday, June 1
  - 09:30 - 10:40 Age group tournament qualification (Clubs and Ribbon)
  - 10:50 - 11:00 Award Ceremony - Age Group Teams
  - 11:15 - 13:00 Junior Individuals qualification - Group B (Clubs and Ribbon)
  - 15:00 - 16:45 Junior Individuals qualification - Group A (Clubs and Ribbon)
  - 17:00 - 17:20 Award Ceremony - Individual All-Around and Junior Teams
  - 18:00 - 18:30 Junior Groups qualification (5 Ribbons)
  - 18:40 - 19:00 Award Ceremony - Junior Groups All-Around
- Tuesday, June 2
  - 09:30 - 11:30 Apparatus Finals Age Group Tournament
  - 11:40 - 12:00 Award Ceremony - Age Group Apparatus Finals
  - 14:30 - 15:40 Junior Individuals Apparatus Finals - Hoop and Ball
  - 15:50 - 16:20 Junior Groups Apparatus Finals - 5 Balls
  - 16:30 - 16:50 Award Ceremony - Junior Individual Apparatus Finals (Hoop and Ball)
  - 17:00 - 18:10 Junior Individuals Apparatus Finals - Clubs and Ribbon
  - 18:20 - 18:50 Junior Groups Apparatus Finals - 5 Ribbons
  - 19:00 - 19:20 Award Ceremony - Junior Individual & Groups Apparatus Finals (Clubs and Ribbon, 5 Balls and 5 Ribbons)

=== Senior ===
- Friday, 5 June
  - 10:40 Opening Ceremony
  - 11:00 - 13:00 Senior Individuals qualification - Group A (Hoop and Ball)
  - 15:00 - 17:00 Senior Individuals qualification - Group B (Hoop and Ball)
  - 18:30 - 19:35 Senior Groups qualification (5 Balls)
- Saturday, 6 June
  - 11:00 - 13:00 Senior Individuals qualification - Group B (Clubs and Ribbon)
  - 15:00 - 17:00 Senior Individuals qualification - Group A (Clubs and Ribbon)
  - 16:30 - 16:50 Award Ceremony - Individual All-Around and Senior Teams
  - 18:30 - 19:35 Senior Groups qualification (3 Hoop & 2 Clubs)
  - 19:45 - 20:00 Award Ceremony - Senior Groups All-Around
- Sunday, 7 June
  - 13:00 - 14:10 Senior Individuals Apparatus Finals - Hoop and Ball
  - 14:20 - 15:00 Senior Groups Apparatus Finals - 5 Balls
  - 15:10 - 15:30 Award Ceremony - Senior Individual and Groups Apparatus Finals (Hoop and Ball, 5 Balls)
  - 16:00 - 17:10 Senior Individuals Apparatus Finals - Clubs and Ribbon
  - 17:20 - 18:00 Senior Groups Apparatus Finals - 3 Hoop & 2 Clubs
  - 18:10 - 18:30 Award Ceremony - Junior Individual & Groups Apparatus Finals (Clubs and Ribbon, 3 Hoop & 2 Clubs)

== Medal summary ==
=== Senior ===
Event	Gold	Silver	Bronze
Team
Team	Brazil; Maria Eduarda Alexandre; Barbara Domingos; Geovanna Santos	United States; Megan Chu; Natalie de la Rosa	Mexico; Ana Luisa Abraham; Marina Malpica
Individual Finals
All-Around	(Brazil) Bárbara Domingos	(United States) Megan Chu	(United States) Natalie de la Rosa
Hoop	(Brazil) Geovanna Santos	(Brazil) Bárbara Domingos	(United States) Megan Chu
Ball	(United States) Megan Chu	(Brazil) Maria Eduarda Alexandre	(Brazil) Bárbara Domingos
Clubs	(Brazil) Bárbara Domingos	(Brazil) Maria Eduarda Alexandre	(United States) Megan Chu
Ribbon	(Brazil) Geovanna Santos	(United States) Megan Chu	(Brazil) Bárbara Domingos
Group Finals
All-Around	Brazil; Maria Eduarda Arakaki; Maria Paula Caminha; Mariana Vitória Gonçalves; Julia Kurunczi; Sofia Pereira; Nicole Pircio	United States; Goda Balsys; Kristina Lee; Alaini Spata; Aurora Sullivan; Kalina Trayanov; Natalia Ye-Granda	Mexico; Dalia Alcocer; Julia Gutierrez; Jaydi Novelo; Kimberly Salazar; Adirem Tejeda; Giselle Torres
5 Balls	Brazil; Maria Eduarda Arakaki; Maria Paula Caminha; Mariana Vitória Gonçalves; Julia Kurunczi; Sofia Pereira; Nicole Pircio	United States; Goda Balsys; Kristina Lee; Alaini Spata; Aurora Sullivan; Kalina Trayanov; Natalia Ye-Granda	Mexico; Dalia Alcocer; Julia Gutierrez; Jaydi Novelo; Kimberly Salazar; Adirem Tejeda; Giselle Torres
3 Hoops & 2 Clubs	Brazil; Maria Eduarda Arakaki; Maria Paula Caminha; Mariana Vitória Gonçalves; Julia Kurunczi; Sofia Pereira; Nicole Pircio|	Mexico; Dalia Alcocer; Julia Gutierrez; Jaydi Novelo; Kimberly Salazar; Adirem Tejeda; Giselle Torres	United States; Goda Balsys; Kristina Lee; Alaini Spata; Aurora Sullivan; Kalina Trayanov; Natalia Ye-Granda

=== Junior ===
Event	Gold	Silver	Bronze
Team
Team	United States; Anna Filipp; Nina Keys; Izabella Oleynik; Josephine Weber	Brazil; Amanda Manente; Linda Petersen; Mariana Sartori; Beatriz Vieira	Canada; Nava Laksman; Milana Sholkavich; Lillian Yevzlin
Individual Finals
All-Around	(United States) Anna Filipp	(Mexico) Marijose Delgado	(Brazil) Beatriz Vieira
Hoop	(United States) Anna Filipp	(United States) Izabella Oleynik	(Brazil) Beatriz Vieira
Ball	(United States) Anna Filipp	(Mexico) Marijose Delgado	(Brazil) Linda Petersen
Clubs	(United States) Nina Keys	(United States) Anna Filipp	(Brazil) Amanda Manente
Ribbon	(United States) Nina Keys	(United States) Anna Filipp	(Brazil) Beatriz Vieira
Group Finals
All-Around	Brazil; Maria Luiza Albuquerque; Leticia Rosa; Isabella Tenorio; Leona Torres; Melissa Varejão	Mexico; Natalia Barrera; Victoria Brambila; Ximena Gomez; Jenny Juarez; Ana Carolina Martinez; Deila Torres	Canada; Bargina Ablikim; Chiara Buchignani; Evelyn Cheng; Alika Kozak; Gaomingze Li; Maple Wu
5 Balls	Brazil; Maria Luiza Albuquerque; Leticia Rosa; Isabella Tenorio; Leona Torres; Melissa Varejão	Canada; Bargina Ablikim; Chiara Buchignani; Evelyn Cheng; Alika Kozak; Gaomingze Li; Maple Wu	Mexico; Natalia Barrera; Victoria Brambila; Ximena Gomez; Jenny Juarez; Ana Carolina Martinez; Deila Torres
5 Ribbons	Brazil; Maria Luiza Albuquerque; Leticia Rosa; Isabella Tenorio; Leona Torres; Melissa Varejão	Mexico; Natalia Barrera; Victoria Brambila; Ximena Gomez; Jenny Juarez; Ana Carolina Martinez; Deila Torres	Chile; Isidora Aguilar; Fernanda Aldunate; Amanda Avila; Isabella Farfan; Pascuala Molina; Agustina Suzarte

=== Age group ===
Event	Gold	Silver	Bronze
Team	Brazil; Anny Beatriz Lima; Sophia Rocha; Maria Vitoria Silva	United States; Viktoria Bukareva; Gloria Ruiya	Canada; Siana Etchein; Amelia Zhong
Hoop	(United States) Viktoria Bukareva	(Canada) Siana Etchein	(Brazil) Sophia Rocha
Ball	(United States) Gloria Ruiya	(Brazil) Anny Beatriz Lima	(Canada) Amelia Zhong
Clubs	(United States) Gloria Ruiya	(Canada) Amelia Zhong	(Brazil) Sophia Rocha
Ribbon	(Brazil) Maria Vitoria Silva	(United States) Viktoria Bukareva	(Canada) Siana Etchein

== Results ==
=== Seniors ===
==== Individual all-around ====
The top eight scores in each apparatus qualified for the apparatus finals.

Senior individual all-around results
Rank	Gymnast	Nation	Hoop (rhythmic gymnastics)	Ball (rhythmic gymnastics)	Clubs (rhythmic gymnastics)	Ribbon (rhythmic gymnastics)	Total
1st place, gold medalist(s)	Bárbara Domingos	Brazil	28.550	27.050	27.600	28.500	111.700
2nd place, silver medalist(s)	Megan Chu	United States	27.700	26.450	28.150	28.050	110.350
3rd place, bronze medalist(s)	Natalie de la Rosa	United States	26.900	26.500	28.300	28.200	109.900
4	Celeste D'Arcángelo	Argentina	25.300	24.950	23.400	25.700	99.350
5	Suzanna Shahbazian	Canada	25.350	23.450	26.400	24.050	99.250
6	Ana Luisa Abraham	Mexico	23.400	23.550	27.150	24.850	98.950
7	Jimena Dominguez	Venezuela	25.250	22.750	25.800	24.400	98.200
8	Marina Malpica	Mexico	26.150	24.950	23.500	22.300	96.900
9	Gloriana Sanchez	Costa Rica	24.550	22.450	24.700	23.100	94.800
10	Oriana Viñas	Colombia	24.350	22.800	24.350	20.850	92.350
11	Isabella Rojas	Cuba	23.600	23.150	25.200	20.200	92.150
12	Maria Daniella Gonzalez	Guatemala	21.950	23.250	23.700	22.650	91.550
13	Mayte Guzman	Bolivia	22.200	20.600	22.300	23.350	88.450
14	Josefa Cornejo	Chile	19.750	19.550	22.450	22.550	84.300
15	Ana Marina Cerna	Ecuador	19.800	21.550	23.150	17.850	82.350
16	Luisa Velasquez	Guatemala	21.950	20.100	21.900	17.800	81.750
17	Galilea Alvarez	Costa Rica	18.900	18.450	20.500	19.250	77.100
18	Danna Cortes	Puerto Rico	20.150	19.200	18.600	17.900	75.850
19	Camille Maldonado	Puerto Rico	19.500	17.750	19.650	18.800	75.700
20	Ana Carolina De Conto	Paraguay	16.300	18.550	21.500	19.200	75.550
21	Samantha Lay Zea	Peru	20.250	17.600	20.000	17.350	75.200
22	Sol Solorzano	El Salvador	18.500	18.100	18.050	17.350	72.000
23	Diana Mendoza	Ecuador	17.550	17.400	17.700	16.700	69.350
24	Viva Summer Oduber	Aruba	16.500	16.950	17.500	15.600	66.550
25	Geovanna Santos	Brazil	28.600	—	—	28.100	56.700
26	Suyani Palacios	Nicaragua	13.050	12.650	12.650	15.000	53.350
27	Maria Eduarda Alexandre	Brazil	—	27.250	24.750	—	52.000
28	Sapphire Tellez	Nicaragua	11.900	13.850	12.350	12.550	50.650
29	Zhara Rocabado	Bolivia	16.900	16.800	14.850	—	48.550
30	Pin Rong Lee	Canada	—	23.450	—	23.850	47.300
31	Agostina Vargas Re	Argentina	23.100	—	—	23.800	46.900
32	Jana Alemam	Canada	21.700	—	24.150	—	45.850
33	Emiliana Vargas	Colombia	22.450	—	22.100	—	44.550
34	Alejandra Montilla	Venezuela	—	20.650	23.600	—	44.250
35	Beatriz Rotchi	Dominican Republic	8.550	12.050	11.650	11.600	43.850
36	Lara Granero	Argentina	—	21.850	21.200	—	43.050
37	Luciana Caraballo	Venezuela	21.200	—	—	20.850	42.050
38	Briseida Briceno	Peru	—	—	21.600	19.750	41.350
39	Lizabeth Godales	Cuba	—	—	21.100	20.000	41.100
40	Constanza Ortiz	Chile	20.650	—	—	20.300	40.950
41	Daliana Concepcion	Cuba	20.400	19.750	—	—	40.150
42	Valeriia Cumpa	Peru	18.750	21.050	—	—	39.800
43	Trinidad Gonzalez	Chile	—	20.200	19.600	—	39.800
44	Natalia Dreszer	Colombia	—	22.350	—	16.600	38.950
45	Maria Eugenia Castillo	El Salvador	18.350	—	—	18.400	36.750
46	Gabriela Guevara	El Salvador	—	16.000	16.300	—	32.300
47	Abigail Rodriguez	Dominican Republic	—	11.750	—	13.450	25.200
48	Naovy Feliz	Dominican Republic	10.600	—	11.950	—	22.550
49	Mel Schock	Bolivia	—	—	—	19.450	19.450

==== Hoop ====
Senior hoop final results
Rank	Gymnast	Nation	D Score	E Score	A Score	Pen.	Total
1st place, gold medalist(s)	Geovanna Santos	Brazil	13.600	7.600	7.750		28.950
2nd place, silver medalist(s)	Bárbara Domingos	Brazil	13.700	7.500	7.500	0.100	28.600
3rd place, bronze medalist(s)	Megan Chu	United States	12.800	7.700	7.700		28.200
4	Natalie de la Rosa	United States	12.400	7.550	7.550		27.500
5	Marina Malpica	Mexico	11.700	7.300	7.250		26.250
6	Suzanna Shahbazian	Canada	11.900	7.150	7.250	0.050	26.250
7	Jimena Dominguez	Venezuela	11.700	7.000	7.250		25.950
8	Celeste D'Arcángelo	Argentina	11.400	6.800	7.000		25.200

==== Ball ====
Senior ball final results
Rank	Gymnast	Nation	D Score	E Score	A Score	Pen.	Total
1st place, gold medalist(s)	Megan Chu	United States	11.900	7.900	7.700		27.500
2nd place, silver medalist(s)	Maria Eduarda Alexandre	Brazil	12.100	6.800	7.800		26.700
3rd place, bronze medalist(s)	Bárbara Domingos	Brazil	12.400	6.700	7.550	0.050	26.600
4	Marina Malpica	Mexico	10.700	7.650	7.400		25.750
5	Natalie de la Rosa	United States	11.000	6.950	7.450		25.400
6	Ana Luisa Abraham	Mexico	10.200	7.350	7.500		25.050
7	Celeste D'Arcángelo	Argentina	10.600	7.350	7.050	0.050	24.950
8	Pin Rong Lee	Canada	9.500	7.200	7.100		23.800

==== Clubs ====
Senior clubs final results
Rank	Gymnast	Nation	D Score	E Score	A Score	Pen.	Total
1st place, gold medalist(s)	Bárbara Domingos	Brazil	13.600	7.750	7.750	0.100	29.000
2nd place, silver medalist(s)	Maria Eduarda Alexandre	Brazil	13.100	7.750	7.750		28.600
3rd place, bronze medalist(s)	Megan Chu	United States	13.000	7.450	7.650		28.100
4	Suzanna Shahbazian	Canada	12.000	7.400	7.600		27.000
5	Ana Luisa Abraham	Mexico	12.000	7.250	7.200		26.450
6	Natalie de la Rosa	United States	11.700	7.200	7.450	0.600	25.750
7	Jimena Dominguez	Venezuela	10.800	7.350	7.050	0.050	24.950
8	Isabella Rojas	Cuba	9.900	6.450	7.000		23.350

==== Ribbon ====
Senior ribbon final results
Rank	Gymnast	Nation	D Score	E Score	A Score	Pen.	Total
1st place, gold medalist(s)	Geovanna Santos	Brazil	13.000	7.650	7.750		28.400
2nd place, silver medalist(s)	Megan Chu	United States	13.000	7.600	7.750		28.350
3rd place, bronze medalist(s)	Bárbara Domingos	Brazil	12.900	7.700	7.750	0.100	28.250
4	Celeste D'Arcángelo	Argentina	11.100	7.200	6.950	0.050	25.200
5	Jimena Dominguez	Venezuela	10.700	6.850	7.000		24.550
6	Natalie de la Rosa	United States	10.700	6.700	7.000	0.050	25.750
7	Suzanna Shahbazian	Canada	9.800	7.100	6.800		23.700
8	Ana Luisa Abraham	Mexico	8.600	6.700	7.100		22.400

==== Groups all-around ====
The top eight scores in each apparatus qualified for the apparatus finals.

Senior group all-around results
Rank	Nation	5	3 + 2	Total
1st place, gold medalist(s)	Brazil	28.850	28.600	57.450
2nd place, silver medalist(s)	United States	23.950	25.100	49.050
3rd place, bronze medalist(s)	Mexico	24.300	23.650	47.950
4	Canada	24.050	23.600	47.650
5	Chile	20.850	22.000	42.850
6	Venezuela	20.900	20.250	41.150
7	Colombia	20.500	19.200	39.700
8	Paraguay	17.900	19.400	37.300
9	Argentina	18.600	16.100	34.700
10	Bolivia	14.500	15.000	29.500
11	Peru	9.550	15.900	25.450

==== 5 Balls ====
Senior group 5 balls final results
Rank	Nation	D Score	E Score	A Score	Pen.	Total
1st place, gold medalist(s)	Brazil	14.100	7.600	7.550		29.250
2nd place, silver medalist(s)	United States	12.300	7.250	7.100		26.650
3rd place, bronze medalist(s)	Mexico	11.700	6.150	7.800	0.050	25.550
4	Canada	11.500	7.150	6.500		25.150
5	Colombia	10.500	5.400	7.650		24.750
6	Chile	10.000	5.950	6.150		22.100
7	Venezuela	9.300	6.250	6.100		21.650
8	Argentina	7.800	5.050	5.700		18.550

==== 3 Hoops + 2 Clubs ====
Senior group 3 hoops + 2 clubs final results
Rank	Nation	D Score	E Score	A Score	Pen.	Total
1st place, gold medalist(s)	Brazil	13.800	7.450	7.650		28.900
2nd place, silver medalist(s)	Mexico	12.600	7.200	6.800		26.600
3rd place, bronze medalist(s)	United States	10.800	6.700	7.800	0.300	25.800
4	Canada	10.200	6.650	7.100		23.950
5	Venezuela	9.100	5.950	6.300		21.350
6	Paraguay	8.200	5.150	5.950		19.000
7	Chile					
8	Colombia					

=== Junior ===
==== Hoop ====
Rank	Gymnast	Nation	Total
1st place, gold medalist(s)	Anna Filipp	United States	25.300
2nd place, silver medalist(s)	Izabella Oleynik	United States	24.800
3rd place, bronze medalist(s)	Beatriz Vieira	Brazil	24.750
4	Marijose Delgado	Mexico	23.650
5	Amanda Manente	Brazil	23.500
6	Lillian Yevzlin	Canada	23.150
7	Susana Valbuena	Venezuela	22.000
8	Nava Laksman	Canada	20.050

==== Ball ====
Rank	Gymnast	Nation	Total
1st place, gold medalist(s)	Anna Filipp	United States	25.150
2nd place, silver medalist(s)	Marijose Delgado	Mexico	24.000
3rd place, bronze medalist(s)	Linda Petersen	Brazil	23.600
4	Amanda Manente	Brazil	23.050
5	Lillian Yevzlin	Canada	22.950
6	Mia Salcedo	Peru	22.650
7	Izabella Oleynik	United States	22.500
8	Nava Laksman	Canada	22.100
9	Arantza Diaz	Mexico	21.800

==== Clubs ====
Rank	Gymnast	Nation	Total
1st place, gold medalist(s)	Nina Keys	United States	25.200
2nd place, silver medalist(s)	Anna Filipp	United States	24.700
3rd place, bronze medalist(s)	Amanda Manente	Brazil	23.950
4	Beatriz Vieira	Brazil	23.550
5	Marijose Delgado	Mexico	22.750
6	Lillian Yevzlin	Canada	22.550
7	Sofia Ruiz	Mexico	22.050
8	Milana Sholkavich	Canada	20.650

==== Ribbon ====
Rank	Gymnast	Nation	Total
1st place, gold medalist(s)	Nina Keys	United States	24.800
2nd place, silver medalist(s)	Anna Filipp	United States	24.450
3rd place, bronze medalist(s)	Beatriz Vieira	Brazil	23.550
4	Milana Sholkavich	Canada	22.650
5	Mia Salcedo	Peru	22.400
6	Lillian Yevzlin	Canada	21.400
7	Marijose Delgado	Mexico	20.950
8	Arantza Diaz	Mexico	18.450

==== Groups All-Around ====
Rank	Nation	5	5	Total
1st place, gold medalist(s)	Brazil	21.500	22.100	43.600
2nd place, silver medalist(s)	Mexico	21.350	18.550	39.900
3rd place, bronze medalist(s)	Canada	20.700	15.750	36.450
4	Argentina	16.100	14.900	31.000
5	Chile	16.700	13.800	30.500
6	Colombia	11.200	11.250	22.450

==== 5 Balls ====
Rank	Nation	Total
1st place, gold medalist(s)	Brazil	23.650
2nd place, silver medalist(s)	Canada	21.300
3rd place, bronze medalist(s)	Mexico	20.200
4	Chile	16.250
5	Argentina	15.650
6	Colombia	14.300

==== 5 Ribbons ====
Rank	Nation	Total
1st place, gold medalist(s)	Brazil	20.250
2nd place, silver medalist(s)	Mexico	18.350
3rd place, bronze medalist(s)	Chile	15.550
4	Canada	15.000
5	Argentina	13.800
6	Colombia	12.100

== Medal table ==
* Host nation (Brazil)

Rank	Nation	Gold	Silver	Bronze	Total
1	Brazil*	12	5	9	26
2	United States	10	10	3	23
3	Mexico	0	4	4	8
4	Canada	0	3	5	8
5	Chile	0	0	1	1
Totals (5 entries)		22	22	22	66
