= Lillian Yevzlin =

Canadian rhythmic gymnast (born 2011)

- Born: 30 December 2011 (age 14) Toronto, Ontario

Gymnastics career
- Discipline: Rhythmic gymnastics
- Country represented: Canada (2024-present)
- Club: Trillium Gymnastics Club
Medal record
Rhythmic Gymnastics
Representing Canada
Junior Pan American Championships
Silver medal – second place	2024 Guatemala City	Age Group Team
Silver medal – second place	2024 Guatemala City	Age Group Hoop
Bronze medal – third place	2026 Rio de Janeiro	Team

Lillian Yevzlin (born 30 December 2011) is a Canadian rhythmic gymnast. She represents Canada in international competitions.

== Career ==
Yevzlin made her international debut at the 2024 Pan American Championships in Guatemala City where, competing in the age group category, she won silver with hoop and in teams (along Gillian Lu, Milana Sholkavich and Iana Ivanova).

=== Junior ===
In 2025 Yevzlin became a junior and was included into the Canadian national group. In early May the group won two gold medals in the two event finals at the Portimão International Tournament. Later in the month she took part in the Pan American Championships in Asunción, being 4th in the All-Around, 5th with 5 hoops and 4th with 10 clubs. At the Canadian Championships the group won gold overall. She was then selected to compete at the 3rd Junior World Championships in Sofia alongside Eliza Bendeliani, Iana Ivanova, Cynthia Leng and Gillian Lu, being 16th in the All-Around, 23rd with 5 hoops, 12th with 10 clubs and 19th in teams (with individuals Kate Vetricean and Eva Cao).

The following year she returned to the individual modality, taking part in the Elite Canada where she won the gold medal. In April she won gold in all four apparatus finals and in teams, along Milana Sholkavich, at the Koop Cup. Competing at the Canadian Championships she was crowned national champion. From May 31 to June 2 she competed in the 2026 Pan American Championships, being 5th in the All-Around, 6th with hoop, 5th with ball, 6th with clubs, 6th with ribbon and winning bronze in teams with Nava Laksman and Milana Sholkavich.
