= Melissa Varejão =

Brazilian rhythmic gymnast (born 2011)

- Full name: Melissa Dias Ricas Varejão
- Born: 8 February 2012 (age 14) Vitória, Espírito Santo

Gymnastics career
- Discipline: Rhythmic gymnastics
- Country represented: Brazil; (2025–present)
- Club: Escola de Campeãs
- Head coach: Yasmin Verissimo
- Assistant coach: Mayana Francisco
Medal record
Rhythmic gymnastics
Representing Brazil
Junior Pan American Championships
Gold medal – first place	2026 Rio de Janeiro	Group All-Around
Gold medal – first place	2026 Rio de Janeiro	5 Balls
Gold medal – first place	2026 Rio de Janeiro	5 Ribbons
Junior South American Championships
Gold medal – first place	2022 Paipa	Hoop
Gold medal – first place	2022 Paipa	Rope
Gold medal – first place	2026 Medellín	Group All-Around
Gold medal – first place	2026 Medellín	5 Balls
Gold medal – first place	2026 Medellín	5 Ribbons
Bronze medal – third place	2022 Paipa	Teams
Bronze medal – third place	2022 Paipa	Free-Hands

Melissa Dias Ricas Varejão (born 8 February 2012) is a Brazilian rhythmic gymnast. She represents Brazil in international competitions.

== Career ==
In 2022 Viarejão was selected for the South American Championships in Paipa, winning gold with hoop and rope as well as bronze in free-hands and in teams (alongside Andressa Martins and Nycolle Pereira) among pre juniors.

At the 2024 Brazilian Championships she became the national pre junior champion. The following year she won gold in teams and with clubs, silver in free-hands and bronze in the All-Around in the same competition.

In 2025 she competed in the age group category of the Pan American Championships in Asunción. There she was 4th in teams, along Júlia Lorenzatto, and won silver with hoop and with ribbon. In December she was called up for a national training camp.

=== Junior ===
The following year she was incorporated into the new national junior group made of her, Maria Luiza Albuquerque, Leona Torres, Leticia Rosa, Anna Julia Carvalho, Cecília Pufal, Isabella Tenorio, Manuela Rezende and Maria Eduarda Brustolin. In late May she competed at the 2026 Pan American Championships in Rio de Janeiro, winning gold in the All-Around and in both event finals. In September she was confirmed into the group, alongside Ana Clara Ravazio, Ana Laura Signori, Anita Grandi, Cecília Pufal, Júlia Lorenzatto, Laura Silva and Rafaela Godoy, under the guidance of Yasmin Verissimo and Mayana Francisco. She was also called up for the upcoming Junior South American Championships in Medellín.
