= Goda Balsys =

American rhythmic gymnast

- Born: February 6, 2008 (age 18) Hinsdale, Illinois, U.S.

Gymnastics career
- Discipline: Rhythmic gymnastics
- Country represented: United States; (2022-present)
- Club: North Shore Rhythmic Gymnastics Center
- Head coach: Kamelia Dunavska
- Assistant coach: Margarita Mamzina
Medal record
Representing United States
Rhythmic gymnastics
Event	1st	2nd	3rd
FIG World Cup	0	1	1
Total	0	1	1
Pan American Championships
Silver medal – second place	2025 Asunción	3 Balls & 2 Hoops
Silver medal – second place	2026 Rio de Janeiro	Group All-Around
Silver medal – second place	2026 Rio de Janeiro	5 Balls
Bronze medal – third place	2025 Asunción	Group All-Around
Bronze medal – third place	2025 Asunción	5 Ribbons
Junior Pan American Championships
Silver medal – second place	2023 Guadalajara	Group All-Around
Silver medal – second place	2023 Guadalajara	5 Balls
Bronze medal – third place	2022 Rio de Janeiro	Group All-Around
Bronze medal – third place	2022 Rio de Janeiro	5 Ropes
Bronze medal – third place	2022 Rio de Janeiro	5 Balls
Bronze medal – third place	2023 Guadalajara	5 Ropes

Goda Balsys (born February 6, 2008) is an American rhythmic gymnast. She represents the United States in international competitions as a member of the national group.

== Personal life ==
She took up the sport in 2012. Her younger sister Nida is also a rhythmic gymnast.

== Career ==
=== Junior ===
In 2022 Balsys integrated into the national junior group, she subsequently competed in the Pan American Championships where she won three bronze medals in the All-Around and in the two event finals along Kalina Trayanov, Annabella Hantov, Isabelle Novoseltsky and Kristina Lee.

In 2023 she made her seasonal debut at the Gymnastik International in Schmiden, taking 5th place with 5 balls. In April she took part in the Sofia International Tournament being 11th overall. At the Portimão International Tournament they won bronze with 5 ropes and silver in the All-Around and with 5 balls. In June she competed at the Pan American Championships in Guadalajara (along Annabella Hantov, Kristina Lee, Greta Pavilonyte and Alaini Spata) winning bronze with 5 ropes and silver in the All-Around and with 5 balls. At the 2nd Junior World Championships in Sofia the group took 22nd place in the All-Around, 23rd with 5 ropes, 20th with 5 balls and 11th in teams.

=== Senior ===
She became a senior in 2024 and in September, after the members of the previous group retired, she was called up to form the new senior group under the orders of Kamelia Dunavska and Margarita Mamzina.

The new group made its debut at the Friendship Cup in Alkmaar, winning gold overall. At the World Cup in Sofia they finished 10th overall, 12th with 3 balls & 2 hoops and 8th with ribbons. In Baku they were 11th in the All-Around, 13th with 5 ribbons and 9th in the mixed event. At the Portimão World Challenge Cup they were 5th overall, winning bronze with 5 ribbons and silver with 3 balls & 2 hoops. In June she participated in the Pan American Championships in Asunción, winning bronze in the All-Around and with 5 ribbons as well as silver in the mixed event. In July she performed at the World Cup in Milan, being 13th in the All-Around, 10th with 5 ribbons and 14th with 3 balls & 2 hoops. A week later the group participated in the stage in Cluj-Napoca, finishing 10th overall, 10th with 5 ribbons and 12th in the mixed event. She was then selected for the World Championships in Rio de Janeiro along Kalina Trayanov, Anabella Hantov, Greta Pavilonyte, Alaini Spata and Natalia Ye-Granda.

In 2026 she first competed at the Miss Valentine Grand Prix in Tartu where, as a member of USA Group A along Greta Pavilonyte, Kalina Trayanov, Natalia Ye-Granda, Kristina Lee and Aurora Sullvian, she was.
