= Linda Petersen =

Brazilian rhythmic gymnast (born 2012)

- Full name: Linda Stefenon Petersen
- Born: 4 January 2012 (age 14) United States of America

Gymnastics career
- Discipline: Rhythmic gymnastics
- Country represented: Brazil; (2024–)
- Club: Sociedade Ginástica de Porto Alegre / Nely's School of Rhythmic Gymnastics
- Head coaches: Roberta Dornelles Cassel, Ionela Bobrischew
Medal record
Rhythmic gymnastics
Representing Brazil
Junior Pan American Championships
Silver medal – second place	2026 Rio de Janeiro	Team
Bronze medal – third place	2026 Rio de Janeiro	Ball
South American Cup
Gold medal – first place	2025 Cochabamba	Age Group Team
Gold medal – first place	2025 Cochabamba	Age Group Ball
Gold medal – first place	2025 Cochabamba	Age Group Clubs

Linda Stefenon Petersen (born 4 January 2012) is a Brazilian-American rhythmic gymnast. She represents Brazil in international competitions.

== Career ==
In 2024 Petersen competed among pre-juniors at the Brazilian Championships, winning gold with clubs and silver with hoop. In December she was selected to compete at the Junior South American Championships in Aracaju, winning gold in teams and with clubs among 12 years olds.

The following year she was 7th among gymnasts born in 2012 at the USA Championships. In September she took part in the 2025 South American Cup in the age group (13 years old) category, winning gold with ball, with clubs and in teams along Lays Jorge. Then she took gold with ball and in free hands, silver in the All-Around, with clubs and with ribbon, at the Brazilian Championships. In December she was called up for a national training stage for junior gymnasts.

=== Junior ===
Petersen debuted as a junior at the 2026 Sofia Cup, competing in team with Mariana Sartori, being 15th with ball and 29th with ribbon. In May she was selected to compete with ball and with ribbon at the Pan American Championships in Rio de Janeiro, she was 13th with ribbon and won bronze with ball and silver in teams with Amanda Manente, Mariana Sartori and Beatriz Vieira.

== Routine music information ==
Year	Apparatus	Music title
2026	Hoop	
2026	Ball	from Wonder Woman (2017) / False Impressions by Brand X Music
2026	Clubs	
2026	Ribbon	Heavyweight by Infected Mushroom
2025	Hoop	
2025	Ball	from Wonder Woman (2017) / False Impressions by Brand X Music
2025	Clubs	Rikitikitavi by Faraualla
2025	Ribbon	End Credits (from Coraline) by Bruno Coulais and The Children's Choir of Nice
2025	Freehand	Haze by Power-Haus and Christian Reindl
2024	Hoop	Dance of the Knights by Sergei Prokofiev
2024	Ball	
2024	Clubs	Rikitikitavi by Faraualla
2024	Ribbon	
2024	Freehand	Haze by Power-Haus and Christian Reindl
2023	Hoop	
2023	Ball	The Greatest Show by Hugh Jackman, Keala Settle, Zac Efron, Zendaya and The Greatest Showman Ensemble
2023	Clubs	
2023	Ribbon	Good Omens Opening Title (from BBC's Good Omens) by David Arnold / End Titles - The Theme That Got Left in the Car (from BBC's Good Omens) by David Arnold
2023	Freehand	excerpts from Don Quixote
