= Kalina Trayanov =

Bulgarian-American rhythmic gymnast

- Nickname: Kiki
- Born: August 28, 2007 (age 19) Newport Beach, California, U.S.

Gymnastics career
- Discipline: Rhythmic gymnastics
- Country represented: United States; (2022–present)
- Club: North Shore Rhythmic Gymnastics Center
- Head coach: Kamelia Dunavska
- Assistant coach: Margarita Mamzina
Medal record
Representing United States
Rhythmic gymnastics
Pan American Championships
Silver medal – second place	2026 Rio de Janeiro	Group All-Around
Silver medal – second place	2026 Rio de Janeiro	5 Balls
Junior Pan American Championships
Bronze medal – third place	2022 Rio de Janeiro	Group All-Around
Bronze medal – third place	2022 Rio de Janeiro	5 Ropes
Bronze medal – third place	2022 Rio de Janeiro	5 Balls

Kalina Trayanov (born August 28, 2007) is a Bulgarian-American rhythmic gymnast. She represents the United States in international competitions as a member of the national group.

== Biography ==
=== Junior ===
In 2022 Trayanov integrated into the national junior group, she subsequently competed in the Pan American Championships where she won three bronze medals in the All-Around and in the two event finals along Goda Balsys, Annabella Hantov, Isabelle Novoseltsky and Kristina Lee.

=== Senior ===
She became age eligible for senior competitions in 2023, debuting at the Sofia International Tournament. In June she took 21st place at the USA Gymnastics Championships.

In 2024 she was part of the group of North Shore Rhythmic Gymnastics Center, winning the national title. In September, after the members of the previous group retired, she was called up to form the new senior group under the orders of Kamelia Dunavska and Margarita Mamzina.

In February 2025 she took the national group title. In May the group won gold overall at the Friendship Cup in Alkmaar. A month later she was confirmed into the national team. In July she performed at the World Cup in Milan, being 13th in the All-Around, 10th with 5 ribbons and 14th with 3 balls & 2 hoops. A week later the group participated in the stage in Cluj-Napoca, finishing 10th overall, 10th with 5 ribbons and 12th in the mixed event. She was then selected for the World Championships in Rio de Janeiro along Goda Balsys, Annabella Hantov, Greta Pavilonyte, Alaini Spata and Natalia Ye-Granda.
