= Mariana Sartori =

Brazilian rhythmic gymnast (born 2011)

- Full name: Mariana Radeva Sartori
- Born: 13 January 2011 (age 15) Porto Alegre

Gymnastics career
- Discipline: Rhythmic gymnastics
- Country represented: Brazil; (2024-present)
- Club: Grêmio Náutico União
- Head coach: Anna Danielyan
- Assistant coach: Silvia Miteva
Medal record
Rhythmic gymnastics
Representing Brazil
Junior Pan American Championships
Silver medal – second place	2026 Rio de Janeiro	Team
South American Championships
Gold medal – first place	2024 Santiago	Age Group Team
Gold medal – first place	2024 Santiago	Age Group Ball
Bronze medal – third place	2024 Santiago	Age Group Ribbon
Junior South American Championships
Gold medal – first place	2026 Medellín	Team

Mariana Radeva Sartori (born 13 January 2011) is a Brazilian rhythmic gymnast of Bulgarian descent. She represents Brazil in international competitions.

== Career ==
In November 2024 Sartori competed in the age group (13 years old) at the South American Championships in Santiago, there she won bronze with ribbon, gold with hoop and in teams with Amanda Manente. In December she won gold with 3 ribbons at the Brailian Group Championships.

=== Junior ===
Sartori debuted as a junior in 2025, being selected to compete with ball and with clubs at the Pan American Championships in Asunción. There she was 16th with ball, 7th with clubs and 4th in teams alongside Sarah Mourão, Anna Julia De Carvalho and Nicolle Zacchia. At the Brazilian Championships she was 5th overall and won gold with ball and silver with clubs. In December she was called up for a national training stage for junior gymnasts.

In early 2026, thanks to her Bulgarian roots as her mother is Bulgarian, she trained in Bulgaria under the guidance of Silvia Miteva who created Sartori's new hoop, ball and clubs routines. In April she competed, in a team along Linda Petersen, in the Sofia Cup, competing, being 13th in teams, 19th with hoop and 33rd with clubs. In May she was selected to compete with ball and with ribbon at the Pan American Championships in Rio de Janeiro, she was 13th with ribbon and won bronze with ball and silver in teams with Amanda Manente, Linda Petersen and Beatriz Vieira.
