= 2026 Junior South American Rhythmic Gymnastics Championships =

Rhythmic Gymnastics competition

- Venue: Coliseo De Gimnasia Jorge Hugo Giraldo
- Location: Medellín, Colombia
- Start date: 05 November 2026
- End date: 08 November 2026

The 2026 Junior South American Rhythmic Gymnastics Championships were held in Medellín, Colombia from November 5 to 8, 2026. The competition was organised by the Colombian Gymnastics Federation and approved by the International Gymnastics Federation.

== Medalists ==
=== Junior FIG ===
Event	Gold	Silver	Bronze
Team all-around	Brazil; Gisely Benevenuto; Amanda Manente; Mariana Sartori; Beatriz Vieira	Venezuela; Aranza Conde; Ambar Parra; Susana Valbuena; Fiorella Varesano	Argentina; Delfina Dallavalle; Catalina Neri; Maria Sibilia; Martina Tolosa
Individual all-around	Amanda Manente (BRA)	Beatriz Vieira (BRA)	Susana Valbuena (VEN)
Hoop	Beatriz Vieira (BRA)	Susana Valbuena (VEN)	Amanda Manente (BRA)
Ball	Beatriz Vieira (BRA)	Amanda Manente (BRA)	Catalina Neri (ARG)
Clubs	Gisely Benevenuto (BRA)	Amanda Manente (BRA)	Mia Salcedo (PER)
Ribbon	Amanda Manente (BRA)	Beatriz Vieira (BRA)	Mia Salcedo (PER)
Trio	Brazil; Maria Heckert; Maria Lobo Macedo; Alice Stelzer	Venezuela; Daniela Araujo Colina; Valeria Corzo Adjunta; Emma Lopez Dimarco	Bolivia; Lourdes Piovoso Gallinatti; Galilea Romero Valdivia; Claudia Villagomez Paris
Group all-around	Brazil; Anita Grandi; Rafaela Godoy; Júlia Lorenzatto; Ana Laura Signori; Laura Silva; Melissa Varejão	Argentina; Lara Diaz; Maria Forlino Belzunce; Luana Lopez Galiano; Manuela Rosales; Maria Spillman Brugorello	Colombia; Nicole Iguaran; María Lopez Gonzalez; Isabella Peña; Isabella Posada; Paula Puentes
Group 5 balls	Brazil; Anita Grandi; Rafaela Godoy; Júlia Lorenzatto; Ana Laura Signori; Laura Silva; Melissa Varejão	Peru; Daira Marin Torres; Valeria Rodriguez Rubio; Kamila Salazar Clemente; Luciana Tolentino Aliaga; Rafaella Vera Berrocal	Chile; Isidora Aguillar Aguirre; Amanda Avila; Isabella Farfan; Pascuala Molina; Agustina Suzarte
Group 5 ribbons	Brazil; Anita Grandi; Rafaela Godoy; Júlia Lorenzatto; Ana Laura Signori; Laura Silva; Melissa Varejão	Argentina; Lara Diaz; Maria Forlino Belzunce; Luana Lopez Galiano; Manuela Rosales; Maria Spillman Brugorello	Chile; Isidora Aguillar Aguirre; Amanda Avila; Isabella Farfan; Pascuala Molina; Agustina Suzarte
All-around team			

=== Age group AC4 (14 years old) ===
Event	Gold	Silver	Bronze
Team all-around	Brazil; Anny Lima; Lays Jorge; Amanda Pinto; Sophia Rocha	Venezuela; Anais Cordova Santos; Marcela Corzo Adjunta; Alessandra Dávila Elbarouki; María Salas Meneses	Argentina; Milena Bazila; Stefania Garcia; Lara Perrote; Margarita Ruiz
Individual all-around	Amanda Pinto (BRA)	Lays Jorge (BRA)	María Salas Meneses (VEN)
Hoop	Sophia Rocha (BRA)	Lays Jorge (BRA)	Alessandra Dávila Elbarouki (VEN)
Ball	Amanda Pinto (BRA)	Anny Lima (BRA)	María Salas Meneses (VEN)
Clubs	Sophia Rocha (BRA)	María Salas Meneses (VEN)	Amanda Pinto (BRA)
Ribbon	Lays Jorge (BRA)	Amanda Pinto (BRA)	Stefania Garcia (ARG)
Trio	Venezuela; Ivana Ortegano Fontalvo; Sofia Rangel Villasmil; María Salas Meneses	Brazil; Isabella Casenote Andrade; Isabela De Barros Lima Sica; Rafaela Macchi Kendzerski	Chile; Emilia Bachmann; Amanda Morales Villanueva; Isabela Saldias
Group all-around	Chile; Camila Brintrup; Antonia España Gutierrez; Amanda Martinez Vargas; Fernanda Revillard; Matilda Silva Maldonado	Argentina; Victoria Castro; Milagros Coello Lopez; Uma D'Elia; Juliana Garcia; Visedo Micaela Iara	Venezuela; Yisbanny Caicedo Contreras; Alessandra Dávila Elbarouki; Victoria Gonzalez Benavides; Victoria Jaimes Arteaga; Leymar Murillo Grosso
Group 5 Balls	Chile; Camila Brintrup; Antonia España Gutierrez; Amanda Martinez Vargas; Fernanda Revillard; Matilda Silva Maldonado	Venezuela; Yisbanny Caicedo Contreras; Alessandra Dávila Elbarouki; Victoria Gonzalez Benavides; Victoria Jaimes Arteaga; Leymar Murillo Grosso	Argentina; Victoria Castro; Milagros Coello Lopez; Uma D'Elia; Juliana Garcia; Visedo Micaela Iara
Group 5 Ribbons	Argentina; Victoria Castro; Milagros Coello Lopez; Uma D'Elia; Juliana Garcia; Visedo Micaela Iara	Chile; Camila Brintrup; Antonia España Gutierrez; Amanda Martinez Vargas; Fernanda Revillard; Matilda Silva Maldonado	Venezuela; Yisbanny Caicedo Contreras; Alessandra Dávila Elbarouki; Victoria Gonzalez Benavides; Victoria Jaimes Arteaga; Leymar Murillo Grosso

=== Age group AC3 (12-13 years old) ===
Event	Gold	Silver	Bronze
Team all-around	Brazil; Alice Barbosa Inacio; Giovana Gifoni Cruz Fernandes; Maria Reis Osorio	Venezuela; Camila Cruz García; Shiarisey Monsalve Borrero; Sofía Parra Velásquez	Argentina; Nina Braico; Julia Latorre; Clara Sabic
Individual all-around	Shiarisey Monsalve Borrero (VEN)	Alice Barbosa Inacio (BRA)	Giovana Gifoni Cruz Fernandes (BRA)
Hoop	Alice Barbosa Inacio (BRA)	Shiarisey Monsalve Borrero (VEN)	Giovana Gifoni Cruz Fernandes (BRA)
Clubs	Giovana Gifoni Cruz Fernandes (BRA)	Alice Barbosa Inacio (BRA)	Martina Perez Filipovich (BOL)
Ribbon	Alice Barbosa Inacio (BRA)	Shiarisey Monsalve Borrero (VEN)	Maria Reis Osorio (BRA)
Trio	Brazil; Emmanuella Coradine Castilho; Lara Porto Prates Do Nascimiento; Maria Santos Silva	Bolivia; Ana Mendieta Ribera; Matilde Simon Martinez; Emilia Terrazas Cabrera	Venezuela; Angie Acosta Castellano; Camila Añanguren Besteiro; Franchesca Zerpa Linares
Group all-around	Brazil; Paola Cordeiro Alves; Lara Lima Hutter; Heloisa Melo Martin; Heloisa Pinheiro De Souza; Giovana Queiroz Cavalaro	Venezuela; Camila Cruz Garcia; Mia Garcia Motta; Luna Lozada Pinto; Kelaia Noguera Escalona; Sofía Parra Velasquez; Natalia Perez Dominguez	Bolivia; Mariana Arabe Mendoza; Amanda Cantin Forteza; Valeria Escobar Barba; Dariana Hurtado Cuellar; Victoria Ponzano Cuellar
Group free-hands	Venezuela; Camila Cruz Garcia; Mia Garcia Motta; Luna Lozada Pinto; Kelaia Noguera Escalona; Sofía Parra Velasquez; Natalia Perez Dominguez	Brazil; Paola Cordeiro Alves; Lara Lima Hutter; Heloisa Melo Martin; Heloisa Pinheiro De Souza; Giovana Queiroz Cavalaro	Paraguay; Noa Blanco Nayar; Arianna Britez Keim; Ana Caceres Quintana; Mayra Gamarra Miranda; Milagros Sanchez Meza
Group 5 balls	Brazil; Paola Cordeiro Alves; Lara Lima Hutter; Heloisa Melo Martin; Heloisa Pinheiro De Souza; Giovana Queiroz Cavalaro	Paraguay; Noa Blanco Nayar; Arianna Britez Keim; Ana Caceres Quintana; Mayra Gamarra Miranda; Milagros Sanchez Meza	Venezuela; Camila Cruz Garcia; Mia Garcia Motta; Luna Lozada Pinto; Kelaia Noguera Escalona; Sofía Parra Velasquez; Natalia Perez Dominguez

=== Age group AC2 (10-11 years old) ===
Event	Gold	Silver	Bronze
Team all-around	Brazil; Maria Clara Ferezin Resende; Bruna Siqueira Sacaramento; Valentina Wolski	Venezuela; Angelina Ferreira Chávez; Sarah Rivas Correa; Massiel Sánchez Rojas	Ecuador; América Cerna Robledo; Genesis Mera Esparza; Diana Quirola Castillo
Individual all-around	Bruna Siqueira Sacaramento (BRA)	Maria Clara Ferezin Resende (BRA)	Diana Quirola Castillo (ECU)
Free-hands	Bruna Siqueira Sacaramento (BRA)	Maria Clara Ferezin Resende (BRA)	Genesis Mera Esparza (ECU)
Rope	Bruna Siqueira Sacaramento (BRA)	Massiel Sánchez Rojas (VEN)	Diana Quirola Castillo (ECU)
Hoop	Bruna Siqueira Sacaramento (BRA)	Maria Clara Ferezin Resende (BRA)	Diana Quirola Castillo (ECU)
Trio	Brazil; Heloisa Heil Colombi; Maria Hemmer; Valentina Rocha Ragonha	Venezuela; Jhoseiré Pérez Velásquez; Massiel Sánchez Rojas; Andrea Rincón Medina	Chile; Sahaly Garcia; Renata Jara; Luciana Rehl
Group free-hands	Brazil; Maria Dos Santos Santana; Maria Clara Ferezin Resende; Alice Monteiro Oliveira; Maria Rodrigues Souza; Bruna Siqueira Sacaramento	Venezuela; Marcela Alvarez Contreras; Julieta Hernandez Cohen; Grecia Lopez Chavez; Julieta Rincón Abreu; Amanda Ortigoza Rodriguez	Bolivia; Paula Duran Pastor; Mya Gil Correa; Alexia Gonzalez Aguilera; Maria Moreno Ortuño; Aimi Tamashiro Serrath

== Medal table ==
* Host nation (Colombia)

Rank	Nation	Gold	Silver	Bronze	Total
1	Brazil (BRA)	30	15	5	50
2	Venezuela (VEN)	3	14	8	25
3	Chile (CHI)	2	1	4	7
4	Argentina (ARG)	1	3	6	10
5	Bolivia (BOL)	0	1	4	5
6	Peru (PER)	0	1	2	3
7	Paraguay (PAR)	0	1	1	2
8	Ecuador (ECU)	0	0	5	5
9	Colombia (COL)*	0	0	1	1
Totals (9 entries)		36	36	36	108
