= Giselle Torres =

Mexican rhythmic gymnast

- Full name: Giselle Anahi Torres Martin
- Born: 23 March 2010 (age 16) Guadalajara, Mexico

Gymnastics career
- Discipline: Rhythmic gymnastics
- Country represented: Mexico; (2026–present)
- Training location: Mexico City, Mexico
- Head coach: María Eugenia Figueroa
Medal record
Rhythmic Gymnastics
Representing Mexico
Pan American Championships
| Silver medal – second place | 2026 Rio de Janeiro | 3 Hoops & 4 Clubs |
| Bronze medal – third place | 2026 Rio de Janeiro | Group All-Around |
| Bronze medal – third place | 2026 Rio de Janeiro | 5 Balls |
Central American and Caribbean Games
| Gold medal – first place | 2026 Santo Domingo | Group All-Around |
| Gold medal – first place | 2026 Santo Domingo | 5 Balls |
| Gold medal – first place | 2026 Santo Domingo | 3 Hoops & 4 Clubs |

Giselle Anahi Torres Martin (born 23 March 2010) is a Mexican rhythmic gymnast. She represents Mexico in international competitions.

== Career ==
=== Junior ===
In 2024 Torress helped her native Jalisco win gold in teams at the national championships.

=== Senior ===
Torres became age eligible for senior competitions in 2026, being incorporated into the Mexican senior group. In March, she was called up for a training camp in Beijing, China. The following month the group debuted at the Grand Prix in Thiais, being 10th overall and 6th in the mixed event final. At the World Cup in Tashkent, being 13th in the All-Around, 14th with 5 balls and 9th with 3 hoops & 4 clubs. In June she competed at the Pan American Championships in Rio de Janeiro, along Dalia Alcocer, Julia Gutierrez, Jaydi Novelo, Kimberly Salazar and Adirem Tejeda, winning bronze in the All-Around and with 5 balls as well as silver with 3 hoops & 4 clubs. At the Milan World Cup they were 7th in the All-Around, 4th with 5 balls and 5th in the mixed event. The group then took part in the Central American & Caribbean Games in Santo Domingo, winning all three gold medals. In August she was selected for the World Championships in Frankfurt alongside Dalia Alcocer, Martha Coldwell, Julia Gutierrez, Kimberly Salazar and Adirem Tejeda.
