= Nicolle Zacchia =

Brazilian rhythmic gymnast (born 2010)

- Full name: Nicolle Abelini Zacchia
- Born: July 27, 2010 (age 16) Santo André, São Paulo

Gymnastics career
- Discipline: Rhythmic gymnastics
- Country represented: Brazil (2022–present)
- Club: Ginástica Rítmica São Caetano do Sul
Medal record
Rhythmic gymnastics
Representing Brazil
Junior South American Championships
Gold medal – first place	2023 Asunción	Age Group Team
Gold medal – first place	2025 Posadas	Team
Gold medal – first place	2025 Posadas	Overall Team
Silver medal – second place	2025 Posadas	All-Around
Silver medal – second place	2025 Posadas	Ball
Silver medal – second place	2025 Posadas	Ribbon

Nicolle Abelini Zacchia (born 27 July 2010) is a Brazilian rhythmic gymnast. She represents Brazil in international competitions.

== Career ==
In August 2022 Zacchia took 4th place overall, as well as winning bronze with hoop and silver with ribbon in the junior level 2 category at the Brazilian Championships. In November she took silver in the All-Around and gold in both event finals at the Brazilian Group Championships. Following these results she was called up to represent Brazil in the group category among 12 years old gymnasts.

=== Junior ===
In 2023 she became a junior and in July she won bronze with ribbon and silver in teams, along Manuela Simone and Fernanda Alvaz, at the Brazilian Championships. In late November she took gold in teams with Sarah Mourão and Alice Neves, at the South American Championships in Asunción.

In May 2025 she was selected for the Junior Pan American Championships in Asunción, being 4th in teams and 7th in the ribbon final. In September she took silver with ball and bronze with clubs at nationals. In late October she competed in the South American Championships in Posadas, Misiones, winning gold in teams and overall teams, silver in the All-Around, with ball and with ribbon.

=== Senior ===
Zacchia became age-eligible for senior competitions in 2026.
