= 2025 Junior South American Rhythmic Gymnastics Championships =

Rhythmic Gymnastics competition

- Venue: Centro Provincial de Alto Rendimiento Deportivo
- Location: Posadas, Misiones, Argentina
- Start date: 27 October 2025
- End date: 03 November 2025

The 2025 Junior South American Rhythmic Gymnastics Championships were held in Posadas, Misiones, Argentina, from October 27 to November 3, 2025. The competition was organised by the Argentinian Gymnastics Federation and approved by the International Gymnastics Federation.

== Medalists ==
=== Junior ===
Event	Gold	Silver	Bronze
Team all-around	Brazil; Sarah Mourão; Nicolle Zacchia; Beatriz Vieira	Venezuela; Susana Valbuena; Camila Arismendi; Ambar Parra; Aranza Conde	Argentina; Emma Ceballos; Martina Tolosa; Catalina Neri; Clara Squillari
Individual all-around	Sarah Mourão (BRA)	Nicolle Zacchia (BRA)	Susana Valbuena (VEN)
Hoop	Beatriz Vieira (BRA)	Emma Ceballos (ARG)	Sarah Mourão (BRA)
Ball	Sarah Mourão (BRA)	Nicolle Zacchia (BRA)	Camila Arismendi (VEN)
Clubs	Sarah Mourão (BRA)	Susana Valbuena (VEN)	Melissa Parra (ECU)
Ribbon	Sarah Mourão (BRA)	Nicolle Zacchia (BRA)	Emma Ceballos (ARG)
Group all-around	Brazil; Carolina Bessa; Isabella Anselmo; Julia Diogenes; Lara Melo; Luisa Dos Santos	Argentina; Ailin Escudero; Catalina Galvan; Jazmin Lujan; Martina Peralta; Sofia Salas	Colombia; Isabela Gomez; Isabel Peña Muñoz; Salome Ochoa; Sara Yañez; Valeria Rojas
Group 5 hoops	Brazil; Carolina Bessa; Isabella Anselmo; Julia Diogenes; Lara Melo; Luisa Dos Santos	Argentina; Ailin Escudero; Catalina Galvan; Jazmin Lujan; Martina Peralta; Sofia Salas	Colombia; Isabela Gomez; Isabel Peña Muñoz; Salome Ochoa; Sara Yañez; Valeria Rojas
Group 10 clubs	Brazil; Carolina Bessa; Isabella Anselmo; Julia Diogenes; Lara Melo; Luisa Dos Santos	Colombia; Isabela Gomez; Isabel Peña Muñoz; Salome Ochoa; Sara Yañez; Valeria Rojas	Argentina; Ailin Escudero; Catalina Galvan; Jazmin Lujan; Martina Peralta; Sofia Salas
All-around team	Brazil; Sarah Mourão; Nicolle Zacchia; Beatriz Vieira; Carolina Bessa; Isabella Anselmo; Julia Diogenes; Lara Melo; Luisa Dos Santos	Argentina; Emma Ceballos; Martina Tolosa; Catalina Neri; Clara Squillari; Ailin Escudero; Catalina Galvan; Jazmin Lujan; Martina Peralta; Sofia Salas	Chile; Dominga Badilla; Isidora Gonzalez; Matilde Trivique; Leyla Zenteno; Agustina Claveria; Josefa Muñoz

=== Age group ===
Event	Gold	Silver	Bronze
Team all-around	Brazil; Gisely Benevenuto; Isabella Correia Tenorio; Helena Balarini Ratis	Chile; Josefa Muñoz; Ignacia Calfuquir; Amalia Martinez	Venezuela; Emma Valentina López Dimarco; Mariangela Isabel Parra Bahamon; Leymar Sarahy Murillo Grosso; Daniela Victoria Araujo Colina
Individual all-around	Gisely Benevenuto (BRA)	Isabella Correia Tenorio (BRA)	Helena Balarini Ratis (BRA)
Hoop	Gisely Benevenuto (BRA)	Isabella Correia Tenorio (BRA)	Josefa Muñoz (CHI)
Ball	Gisely Benevenuto (BRA)	Isabella Correia Tenorio (BRA)	Ignacia Calfuquir (CHI)
Clubs	Gisely Benevenuto (BRA)	Isabella Correia Tenorio (BRA)	Ignacia Calfuquir (CHI)
Ribbon	Helena Balarini Ratis (BRA)	Isabella Correia Tenorio (BRA)	Daniela Victoria Araujo Colina (VEN)

== Medal table ==
* Host nation (Argentina)

Rank	Nation	Gold	Silver	Bronze	Total
1	Brazil (BRA)	15	8	2	25
2	Argentina (ARG)*	0	3	3	6
3	Venezuela (VEN)	0	2	4	6
4	Chile (CHI)	0	1	3	4
5	Colombia (COL)	0	1	2	3
6	Ecuador (ECU)	0	0	1	1
Totals (6 entries)		15	15	15	45
