= Beatriz Vieira =

Brazilian rhythmic gymnast (born 2011)

- Born: 11 March 2011 (age 15) Guaratinguetá, Brazil

Gymnastics career
- Discipline: Rhythmic gymnastics
- Country represented: Brazil; (2024–)
- Head coach: Carol Nogueira de Oliveira
Medal record
Rhythmic gymnastics
Representing Brazil
Junior Pan American Championships
| Gold medal – first place | 2024 Guatemala City | Age Group Ribbon |
| Silver medal – second place | 2026 Rio de Janeiro | Team |
| Bronze medal – third place | 2024 Guatemala City | Age Group Team |
| Bronze medal – third place | 2026 Rio de Janeiro | All-Around |
| Bronze medal – third place | 2026 Rio de Janeiro | Hoop |
| Bronze medal – third place | 2026 Rio de Janeiro | Ribbon |
Junior South American Championships
| Gold medal – first place | 2024 Aracaju | Team |
| Gold medal – first place | 2024 Aracaju | All-Around Team |
| Gold medal – first place | 2025 Posadas | Team |
| Gold medal – first place | 2025 Posadas | Hoop |
| Gold medal – first place | 2026 Medellín | Team |
| Silver medal – second place | 2026 Medellín | All-Around |
| Bronze medal – third place | 2024 Aracaju | All-Around |

Beatriz Vieira (born 11 March 2011) is a Brazilian rhythmic gymnast. She represents Brazil in international competitions.

== Biography ==
In 2021 Vieira took bronze at the Brazilian Championships among gymnasts born in 2011 and silver with rope among pre-junior.

The following year she won silver with hoops and with ribbon at the 2022 Championships. In December of that year she was called up for a national training stage.

In 2024 she competed in the age group category (13 years old) at the Pan American Championships in Guatemala City, winning gold with ribbon and bronze in teams along Anna Júlia de Carvalho. In December she competed in the Junior South American Championships in Aracaju, winning gold in teams, along Anna Julia De Carvalho and Sarah Mourão, the All-Around team, as well as bronze in the All-Around.

=== Junior ===
Vieira became a junior in 2025, in May it was revealed she was chosen to represent Brazil at the 3rd Junior World Championships in Sofia along Sarah Mourão and the national junior group. There she was 7th in teams, 18th with hoop and 16th with ribbon. In July she was selected for the Junior Pan American Games in Asunción, Paraguay. She took 6th place in the all-around. She took 5th place in ball and 7th in hoop, clubs and ribbon finals.

The following year she was selected to compete at the 2026 Pan American Championships in Rio de Janeiro. There she won silver in teams (along Amanda Manente, Linda Petersen and Mariana Sartori) and bronze in the All-Around, with hoop and with ribbon.

== Routine music information ==
| Year | Apparatus | Music title |
|---|---|---|
| 2026 | Hoop | Deliver Us by Ofra Haza and Egen Riegel, from The Prince of Egypt (1998) |
| 2026 | Ball | Somewhere Over the Rainbow |
| 2026 | Clubs | When I Climb to the Top of Mount Rock by the Original Broadway Cast of School of Rock |
| 2026 | Ribbon | The Flight of the Bumblebee |
| 2025 | Hoop | Deliver Us by Ofra Haza and Egen Riegel, from The Prince of Egypt (1998) |
| 2025 | Ball | Somewhere Over the Rainbow |
| 2025 | Clubs | When I Climb to the Top of Mount Rock by the Original Broadway Cast of School of Rock |
| 2025 | Ribbon | Can Can (Rock version) |
| 2024 | Hoop | Hallelujah by No Resolve |
| 2024 | Ball | Vou Voar (Música do filme Netflix "A Caminho da Lua") by PRISCILLA |
| 2024 | Clubs | Forró do Xenhenhem (Ao Vivo) by Elba Ramalho |
| 2024 | Ribbon | Can Can (Rock version) |
