= Natalia Ye-Granda =

American gymnast

- Born: May 19, 2008 (age 18) San Diego

Gymnastics career
- Discipline: Rhythmic gymnastics
- Country represented: United States; (2021–present)
- Head coach: Kamelia Dunavska
- Assistant coach: Margarita Mamzina
Medal record
Representing United States
Rhythmic gymnastics
Event	1st	2nd	3rd
FIG World Cup	0	1	1
Total	0	1	1
Pan American Championships
Silver medal – second place	2025 Asunción	3 Balls & 2 Hoops
Silver medal – second place	2026 Rio de Janeiro	Group All-Around
Silver medal – second place	2026 Rio de Janeiro	5 Balls
Bronze medal – third place	2025 Asunción	Group All-Around
Bronze medal – third place	2025 Asunción	5 Ribbons

Natalia Ye-Granda (born May 19, 2008) is an American rhythmic gymnast. She represents the United States in international competitions as a member of the national group.

== Career ==
In 2021 Ye-Granda participated in the Irina Cup in Warsaw, being 14th among juniors. At the USA Gymnastics Championships she was 17th in the All-Around.

In 2023 she competed at Miss Valentine in Tartu, winning bronze in the All-Around and gold with hoop and with ribbon among gymnasts born in 2008. In June she was 10th overall at nationals and was named part of the national team.

She became a senior in 2024 and in September, after the members of the previous group retired, she was called up to form the new senior group under the orders of Kamelia Dunavska and Margarita Mamzina.

The new group made its debut at the Friendship Cup in Alkmaar, winning gold overall. At the World Cup in Sofia they finished 10th overall, 12th with 3 balls & 2 hoops and 8th with ribbons. In Baku they were 11th in the All-Around, 13th with 5 ribbons and 9th in the mixed event. At the Portimão World Challenge Cup they were 5th overall, winning bronze with 5 ribbons and silver with 3 balls & 2 hoops. In June she participated in the Pan American Championships in Asunción, winning bronze in the All-Around and with 5 ribbons as well as silver in the mixed event. In July she performed at the World Cup in Milan, being 13th in the All-Around, 10th with 5 ribbons and 14th with 3 balls & 2 hoops. A week later the group participated in the stage in Cluj-Napoca, finishing 10th overall, 10th with 5 ribbons and 12th in the mixed event. She was then selected for the World Championships in Rio de Janeiro along Kalina Trayanov, Anabella Hantov, Greta Pavilonyte, Alaini Spata and Goda Balsys.
