= Kamelia Dunavska =

Bulgarian rhythmic gymnast

- Born: April 21, 1969 (age 57) Sofia, Bulgaria

Gymnastics career
- Discipline: Rhythmic gymnastics
- Country represented: Bulgaria
- Club: CSKA Sofia

Kamelia Dunavska (Bulgarian: Камелия Дунавска, born 21 April 1969) is a Bulgarian female former rhythmic gymnast and trainer. She is the head coach of the American rhythmic gymnastics national group. She previously worked with the Turkey national group.

Dunavska competed as part of the Bulgarian group and won gold medals at the 1987 World Championships held in Varna, Bulgaria and at the 1988 European Championships in Helsinki, Finland. Her twin sister Adriana is also a former rhythmic gymnast.

After retiring from active sports, she became a coach in rhythmic gymnastics. For a short period, she served as coach of the Bulgarian national ensemble.

In 2020, she was appointed head coach of the Turkey national team. She continued to live in Bulgaria and traveled to Turkey to coach the national group, for two weeks to a month at a time. The Turkish group she coached won the gold medal in the 3 Hoops + 4 Clubs final at the 2020 European Championships held in Ukraine. She also worked with the German national group. In 2024, she became the coach of the American senior group.

In October 2024, she organized an international competition in Samokov that drew competitors from twelve countries. Olympic champion Darja Varfolomeev and European champion Stiliana Nikolova performed exhibitions.
