= Rachel Stoyanov =

Bulgarian rhythmic gymnast

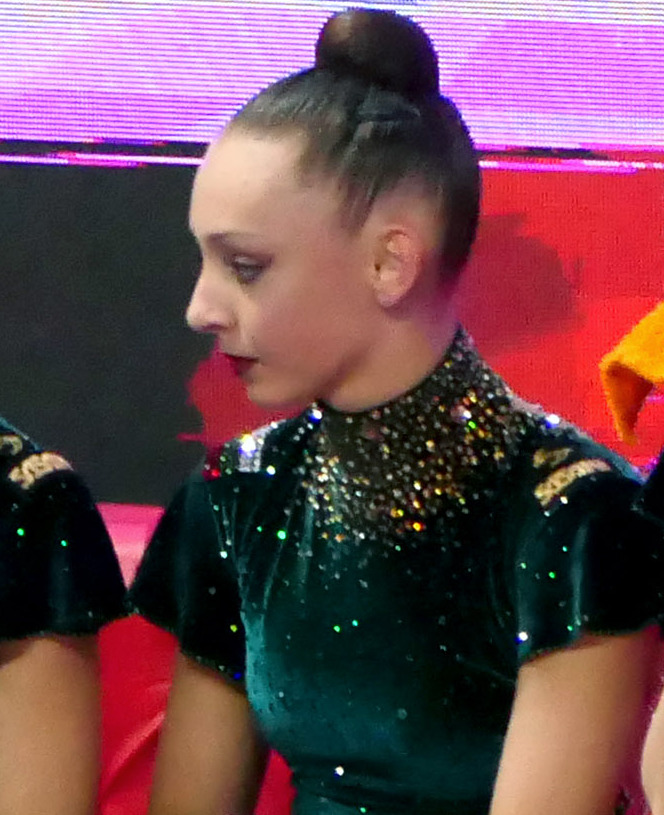
- Stoyanov in 2024

Personal information
- Alternative name: Rachel
- Nickname: Reichi
- Born: March 14, 2003 (age 23) Los Angeles, United States

Gymnastics career
- Discipline: Rhythmic gymnastics
- Country represented: Bulgaria; (2021 - present)
- Former countries represented: North Macedonia
- Club: Levski
- Head coach: Vesela Dimitrova
- Assistant coaches: Mihaela Maevska, Yasena Stoyneva
- Former coach: Neshka Robeva
- World ranking: 1 WC
Medal record
International Gymnastics Competitions
Event	1st	2nd	3rd
World Championships	3	3	1
European Championships	5	1	0
Grand Prix Series	3	2	1
FIG World Cup	5	5	2
European Cup	3	2	2
Total	19	13	6
Representing Bulgaria
Rhythmic Gymnastics
World Championships
Gold medal – first place	2022 Sofia	Group All-Around
Gold medal – first place	2022 Sofia	3 ribbon + 2 balls
Gold medal – first place	2023 Valencia	Team
Silver medal – second place	2025 Rio de Janeiro	Team
Silver medal – second place	2026 Frankfurt	Team
Bronze medal – third place	2026 Frankfurt	5 Balls
European Championships
Gold medal – first place	2022 Tel Aviv	Team
Gold medal – first place	2023 Baku	Group All-Around
Gold medal – first place	2023 Baku	Team
Gold medal – first place	2024 Budapest	Group All-Around
Gold medal – first place	2024 Budapest	Team
Silver medal – second place	2023 Baku	5 Hoops
European Cup
Gold medal – first place	2024 Baku	3 Ribbons + 2 Balls
Gold medal – first place	2025 Baku	Cross Battle
Gold medal – first place	2025 Burgas	3 Balls & 2 Hoops
Silver medal – second place	2025 Burgas	Cross Battle
Silver medal – second place	2025 Burgas	5 Ribbons
Bronze medal – third place	2024 Baku	5 Hoops
Bronze medal – third place	2025 Baku	5 Ribbons

Rachel Stoyanov (born March 14, 2003) is a Bulgarian rhythmic gymnast. She formerly represented North Macedonia in individual competition until 2021, when she joined the Bulgarian group.

She is the 2022 World Group all-around champion, a two-time (2023, 2024) European group all-around champion and a three-time (2022–2024) European Team champion.

== Gymnastics career ==
Stoyanov was born in the United States; her mother is from North Macedonia, while her father is from Bulgaria. She started practicing rhythmic gymnastics at the age of 4, when her mother took her to the Levski Club in Sofia, where Neshka Robeva trained her. Although she lived and trained in Bulgaria, she chose to represent North Macedonia as an individual rhythmic gymnast.

=== Junior ===
She participated in the 2018 Junior European Championships in Guadalajara, Spain. She was 15th in the individual all-around competition, with her best apparatus being ball and clubs (34th place for both).

=== Senior ===
==== 2019 ====
In her first year in the senior category, Stoyanov participated in the Ritam Cup in Serbia, where she obtained bronze in the all-around.

Her first appearance in the senior category and in the FIG World Cup Series was the World Cup Pesaro. That same year she also participated in the Sofia and the Baku World Cups and in the World Cup Challenge in Cluj-Napoca. She also participated in the 2019 Rhythmic Gymnastics European Championships in Baku, Azerbaijan, where she was 42nd in the all-around.

Stoyanov participated in her first world championship, the 2019 World Championships in Baku, Azerbaijan, where she was ranked 68th in the all-around.

==== 2020 ====
In February, Stoyanov participated in the Irina Deleanu Cup in Bucharest, Romania, where she placed eighth in the all-around.

Due to the COVID-19 pandemic, she was unable to compete in the FIG World Cup series, which were cancelled. In October, she participated in the International RG Online Tournament in Moscow organized by Irina Viner, where she obtained ninth place in the all-around and the silver medal with the hoop. She also participated in the International Online Tournament of Julieta Shishmanova, where she obtained silver in the all-around.

At the end of the year, she participated in the 2020 Rhythmic Gymnastics European Championships in Kyiv, Ukraine where she obtained 16th place in the all-around

==== 2021 ====
Stoyanov participated in all four World Cups: the Sofia World Cup in March, Tashkent (where she obtained her best placement) and Baku in April, and Pesaro in May.

In June, she participated in the 2021 Rhythmic Gymnastics European Championships in Varna, Bulgaria, where she made it to the top 24 all-around final and became the first gymnast from North Macedonia to do so. She also had the opportunity to fight for the last remaining place to enter the Olympic Games, the European continental spot. However, she was ranked 23rd in the final and did not obtain the Olympic quota. She also won the "Shooting Star" award.

==== 2022 ====
At the end of the 2021 season, Stoyanov was selected to compete with the Bulgarian group, led by Vesela Dimitrova and her assistant Mihaela Maevska. In February 2022, the International Gymnastics Federation (FIG) approved her change of nationality to represent Bulgaria and leave North Macedonia.

Although the first competition of the Bulgarian group was in March, at the Grand Prix in Marbella, Stoyanov was selected to compete beginning the World Cup Challenge in Pamplona in May, where they obtained fourth place in the all-around, fifth in the 5 hoops final and the silver medal in the mixed apparatus final with 3 ribbons and 2 balls. In June they competed in the World Cup in Pesaro, where the Bulgarian group won the silver medal all-around and the mixed apparatus final, as well as the bronze medal in the 5 hoops final.

She was selected to compete at 2022 Rhythmic Gymnastics European Championships in Tel Aviv, Israel with the group, along with her teammates Zhenina Trashlieva, Sofia Ivanova, Kamelia Petrova, Vaya Draganova and Margarita Vasileva. They finished fourth in the all-around and 5-hoops final, and 6th in the 3 ribbons and 2 balls final. The Bulgarian group, along with the individuals Boryana Kaleyn and Stiliana Nikolova, also won the team gold.

The group also participated in the last World Cup of the year in August and the last competition before the World Championship, the World Cup Challenge in Cluj-Napoca where the Bulgarian group won gold overall and in the 5 hoops and mixed apparatus final.

In September 2022, Stoyanov, along with her teammates, Sofia Ivanova, Kamelia Petrova, Radina Tomova, Zhenina Trashlieva and Margarita Vasileva, participated in the 2022 Rhythmic Gymnastics World Championships in Sofia, Bulgaria. They won the all-around gold and as well as the mixed apparatus final, and they obtained a group quota for the Olympic Games in Paris 2024.

==== 2023 ====
In 2023 the group began their season at the Grand Prix in Marbella. There they won the all-around as well as the both event finals. Later they won all-around silver at the World Cup in Athens, and they won gold in the same category two weeks later in Sofia. At the 2023 European Championships, held in Baku, Stoyanov won gold medals in both the group all-around and team competition. In the 5 hoops final, she won the silver medal, and she placed fifth in the 3 ribbons + 2 balls final.

==== 2024 ====
In March 2024, Stoyanov and the group were fifth in the all-around and 6th with 2 balls and 3 ribbons at the World Cup in Athens. In April they won bronze in the all-around and silver with 3 ribbons and 2 balls at the World Cup in Sofia. In June, the group won the gold medal in the all-around at the 2024 European Championships in Budapest, Hungary. They also won gold in the Team event together with the individual gymnasts, Boryana Kaleyn, Elvira Krasnobaeva and Stiliana Nikolova. They placed fourth in the 5 hoops final and 8th in the 3 ribbons + 2 balls final.

In August, Stoyanov was selected to compete as part of the group at the Olympic Games in Paris, where she, Kamelia Petrova, Sofia Ivanova, Margarita Vasileva and Magdalina Minevska, took fourth place in the final after making mistakes in their 5 hoops routine.

In October it was announced that she made the decision to retire along with Petrova, Vasileva and Minevska. However, it was announced in December that she had decided to continue after all after undergoing surgery on her meniscus and that she was included in the 2025 national team. In the current Bulgarian group are also Sofia Ivanova (also part of the previous team), Viktoria Georgieva, Sofia Pavlova, Suzan Pouladian, Alina Kolomiets, Ivon Boshkilova and Danaya Atanasova. The captain of the team is Sofia Ivanova.

==== 2025 ====
In April 2025 the new group debuted at their domestic World Cup stage in Sofia, being 4th in the All-Around and winning gold with 5 ribbons. In Baku, they won gold in the All-Around and bronze with 3 balls & 2 hoops. In May, they won gold medals in cross battle at both European Cups (Baku, Burgas). Next month, they competed at the 2025 European Championships in Tallinn, Estonia. Due to many mistakes in both routines, they finished on 15th place in all-around and failed to qualify to apparatus finals. In July, the group took 5th place in all-around at Cluj-Napoca World Challenge Cup and won bronze medal in 5 ribbons final.

In August she was selected to compete at the 2025 World Championships in Rio de Janeiro, Brazil along Danaya Atanasova, Sofia Ivanova, Alina Kolomiets and Emilia Obretenova. They took 6th place in the All-Around, after a drop in mixed routine, winning silver in the team event together with Eva Brezalieva and Stiliana Nikolova. Right after World Championships, Rachel underwent her second knee surgery and is still recovering to start competing again.

==== 2026 ====
She returned to the competition in July, competing at Milan World Cup, where she and her group took 9th place in all-around and debuted new 5 balls routine, which got them 5th place in the apparatus final. She was chosen to represent Bulgaria alongside Raya Bozhilova, Magdalina Minevska, Emilia Obretenova and Margarita Vasileva at the 2026 World Championships in Frankfurt, Germany. In group all-around competition they finished off the podium, on 6th place, due to mistakes in 5 Balls routine. They won bronze medals in both apparatus finals and silver medal in team competition alongside Eva Brezalieva and Stiliana Nikolova.

== Detailed Olympic results ==
Year	Competition Description	Location	Music	Apparatus	Rank	Score-Final	Rank	Score-Qualifying
2024	Olympics	Paris		All-around	4th	67.800	1st	70.400
2024	Olympics	Paris	Chi Mai, Dona Is Sick by Ennio Morricone, Bulgarian Voices	5 Hoops	7th	34.100	2nd	37.700
2024	Olympics	Paris	Someone else (Acapella)' by Allegro	3 Ribbons + 2 Balls	1st	33.700	2nd	32.700

== See also ==
- Nationality changes in gymnastics
