= Radina Tomova =

Bulgarian rhythmic gymnast

- Радина Томова
- Born: 2 December 2005 (age 20) Sofia, Bulgaria

Gymnastics career
- Discipline: Rhythmic gymnastics
- Country represented: Bulgaria (2020-present)
- Club: Lokomotiv Sofia
- Head coach: Vesela Dimitrova
- Assistant coach: Mihaela Maevska
- Former coach: Valentina Ivanova
- Choreographer: Margarita Budinova
Medal record
Rhythmic Gymnastics
Representing Bulgaria
Event	1st	2nd	3rd
World Championships	3	0	0
European Championships	2	1	0
Grand Prix	3	0	0
FIG World Cup	1	1	0
Total	10	2	0
World Championships
Gold medal – first place	2022 Sofia	Group All-Around
Gold medal – first place	2022 Sofia	3 Ribbons + 2 Balls
Gold medal – first place	2023 Valencia	Team
European Championships
Gold medal – first place	2023 Baku	Group All-Around
Gold medal – first place	2023 Baku	Team
Silver medal – second place	2023 Baku	5 Hoops

Radina Tomova (Bulgarian: Радина Томова; born 2 December 2005) is a Bulgarian rhythmic gymnast. She won a gold medal in the group all-around at the 2022 World Championships as well as in the 3 ribbons + 2 balls final. She is the European all-around champion and team champion with the Bulgarian team in 2023, as well as a silver medalist in the 5 hoops final.

== Career ==
Tomova switched from individual gymnastics to the national group in late summer 2022, where she replaced Vaya Draganova. On September 16, 2022, she, along with her teammates Sofia Ivanova, Kamelia Petrova, Rachel Stoyanov, Zhenina Trashlieva, Margarita Vasileva, won gold in the group all-around at the World Championships and won Bulgaria a spot for the 2024 Olympic Games in Paris.

In 2023, the group competed at the Grand Prix Marbella, where she won the all-around as well as the gold medals in the both event finals. They went on to the win the all-around silver at the World Cup in Athens, and they won the all-around gold at their next World Cup two weeks later in Sofia. At the 2023 European Championships, held in Baku, she won gold medals in both the group all-around and the team competition. In the 5 hoops final, she won a silver medal, and the group placed 5th in the 3 ribbons + 2 balls final. She was removed from the group after the 2023 World Championships, where the group had a disappointing performance, and began coaching.

Tomova tested positive for hydrochlorothiazide, a banned diuretic, in 2024. She was disqualified from competing for three years until October 1, 2027.
