= Margarita Vasileva =

Bulgarian rhythmic gymnast (born 2005)

- Маргарита Василева
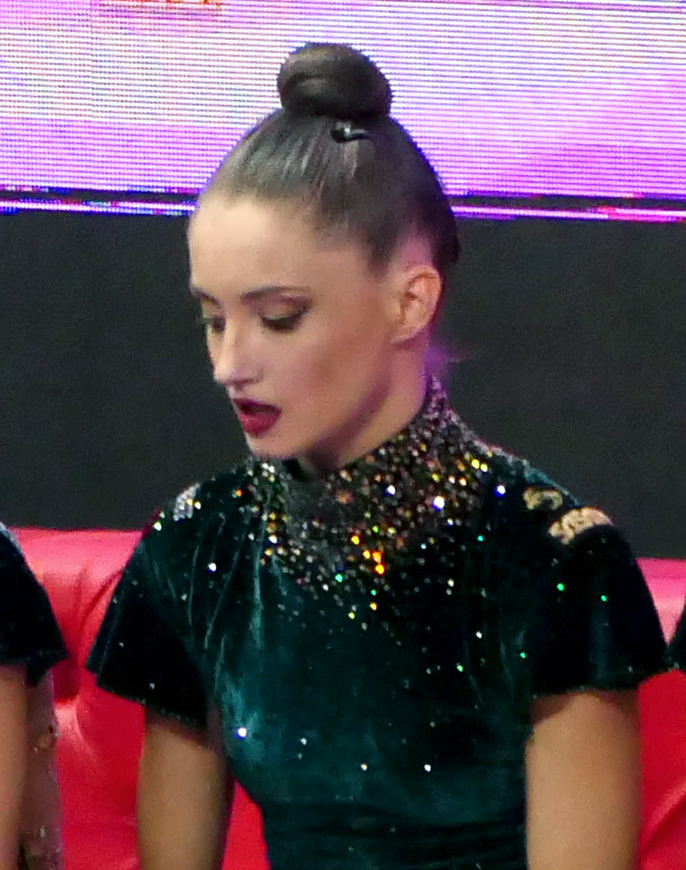
- Vasileva in 2024

Personal information
- Nickname: Margi
- Born: 30 May 2005 (age 21) Sofia, Bulgaria

Gymnastics career
- Discipline: Rhythmic gymnastics
- Country represented: Bulgaria; (2017-2024, 2026-)
- Head coach: Vesela Dimitrova
- Assistant coaches: Mihaela Maevska, Yasena Stoyneva
- Former coaches: Rumyana Metodieva, Vyara Vatashka, Cvetelina Naydenova
- Choreographer: Margarita Budinova
Medal record
Representing Bulgaria
| Event | 1st | 2nd | 3rd |
|---|---|---|---|
| World Championships | 2 | 1 | 1 |
| European Championships | 4 | 0 | 0 |
| FIG World Cup | 4 | 5 | 4 |
| FIG European Cup | 1 | 0 | 1 |
| Total | 11 | 6 | 6 |
World Championships
| Gold medal – first place | 2022 Sofia | Group All-Around |
| Gold medal – first place | 2022 Sofia | 3 ribbons+2 balls |
| Silver medal – second place | 2026 Frankfurt | Team |
| Bronze medal – third place | 2026 Frankfurt | 5 Balls |
European Championships
| Gold medal – first place | 2022 Tel Aviv | Team |
| Gold medal – first place | 2024 Budapest | Group All-Around |
| Gold medal – first place | 2024 Budapest | Team |
| Gold medal – first place | 2026 Varna | Team |
European Cup
| Gold medal – first place | 2024 Baku | 3 Ribbons + 2 Balls |
| Bronze medal – third place | 2024 Baku | 5 Hoops |
Junior European Championships
| Bronze medal – third place | 2019 Baku | Team |

Margarita Vasileva (Bulgarian: Маргарита Василева; born 30 May 2005) is a Bulgarian rhythmic gymnast. She is world champion with the Bulgarian team in All-around at the world championship 2022 in Sofia and world champion in final with 3 ribbons+2balls. She is the 2024 European all-around champion and team champion. She won gold in the senior team competition at the 2022 European Championships.

== Personal life ==
She started to train in rhythmic gymnastics when she was 7, encouraged by her mother. Her idol is former group captain Simona Dyankova and her goal is to become Olympic champion.

== Career ==
=== Junior ===
Vasileva was selected for the Bulgarian junior group in 2017, winning medals internationally.

She was a member of the group that competed at the 2019 Junior European Championships in Baku, Azerbaijan, where they took 12th place in group all-around. At the Junior World Championships in Moscow, they took 12th place in group all-around and did not advance into any apparatus finals.

=== Senior ===
==== 2024 Olympic cycle ====
In 2022, when the girls of the previous senior group retired after becoming Olympic champions, Vasileva became a starter in the two routines since the World Cup in Pesaro, where the group won silver in the All-Around and 3 ribbons + 2 balls and bronze with 5 hoops. She also took part in the stages of Pamplona (bronze with 5 hoops and silver with 3 ribbons + 2 balls) and Cluji-Napoca (All-Around, 5 hoops and 3 ribbons + 2 balls gold). In June she was part of the group for the European Championship in Tel Aviv, she won gold in the senior team category along with Vaya Draganova, Zhenina Trashlieva, Sofia Ivanova, Rachel Stoyanov, Kamelia Petrova and the individuals Boryana Kaleyn and Stiliana Nikolova.

In 2023 the group started in Marbella, where she won the All-Around as well as the gold medals in the finals with 5 hoops and with 2 balls and 3 ribbons. Later they won All-Around silver at the World Cup in Athens, they won gold in the same category two weeks later in Sofia.

In March 2024 Margarita and the group were 5th in the All-Around and 6th with 2 balls and 3 ribbons at the World Cup in Athens. In April the girls won bronze in the All-Around and silver with 3 ribbons and 2 balls in Sofia. In June, Margarita and the group won gold medal in the All-around at the 2024 European Championships in Budapest, Hungary. They also won gold in Team event, together with Boryana Kaleyn, Elvira Krasnobaeva and Stiliana Nikolova. They placed 4th in 5 Hoops final and 8th in 3 Ribbons + 2 Balls final.

In August she was selected for the Olympic Games in Paris, where Margarita, Kamelia Petrova, Sofia Ivanova, Rachel Stoyanov and Magdalina Minevska, took 4th place in the final after making mistakes in the 5 hoops routine. In October she announced she made the decision to retire along Petrova, Minevska and Stoyanov.

==== 2028 Olympic cycle ====
In September 2025 it was revealed she returned to the national group.

In 2026 the group debuted at the World Cup in Sofia, being 4th with 5 balls, 8th with 3 hoops & 4 clubs, winning bronze in the All-Around. In Baku they were 8th in the All-Around, 12th with 5 balls and took bronze with 3 hoops & 4 clubs. In May, the team competed at the 2026 European Championships in Varna, Bulgaria. They took 6th place in group all-around competition, and qualified to 5 Balls final, where they were 8th. They won gold medal in team competition alongside Eva Brezalieva and Stiliana Nikolova. In August, she was chosen to represent Bulgaria alongside Raya Bozhilova, Magdalina Minevska, Emilia Obretenova and Rachel Stoyanov at the 2026 World Championships in Frankfurt, Germany. In group all-around competition they finished off the podium, on 6th place, due to mistakes in 5 Balls routine. They won bronze medals in both apparatus finals and silver medal in team competition alongside Eva Brezalieva and Stiliana Nikolova.

== Detailed Olympic results ==
| Year | Competition Description | Location | Music | Apparatus | Rank | Score-Final | Rank | Score-Qualifying |
|---|---|---|---|---|---|---|---|---|
| 2024 | Olympics | Paris | | All-around | 4th | 67.800 | 1st | 70.400 |
| 2024 | Olympics | Paris | Chi Mai, Dona Is Sick by Ennio Morricone, Bulgarian Voices | 5 Hoops | 7th | 34.100 | 2nd | 37.700 |
| 2024 | Olympics | Paris | Someone else (Acapella)' by Allegro | 3 Ribbons + 2 Balls | 1st | 33.700 | 2nd | 32.700 |
