= Sofia Ivanova =

Bulgarian rhythmic gymnast (born 2005)

- София Иванова
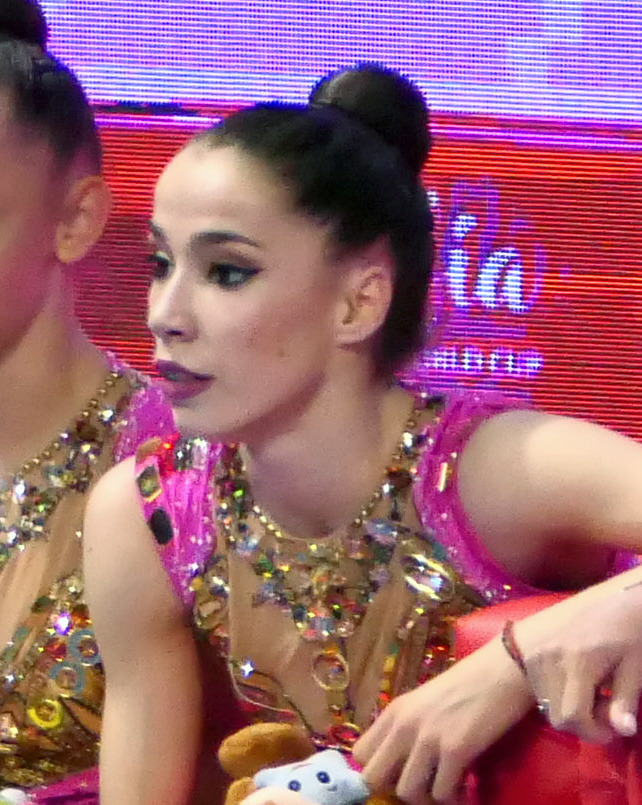
- Ivanova in 2024

Personal information
- Nickname: Sofi
- Born: 15 September 2005 (age 21) Sofia, Bulgaria

Gymnastics career
- Discipline: Rhythmic gymnastics
- Country represented: Bulgaria; (2017-)
- Club: Levski Iliana
- Head coach: Vesela Dimitrova
- Assistant coaches: Mihaela Maevska, Yasena Stoyneva
- Choreographer: Margarita Budinova
Medal record
Representing Bulgaria
Event	1st	2nd	3rd
World Championships	3	1	0
European Championships	6	1	0
Grand Prix Series	3	2	1
FIG World Cup	9	6	6
FIG European Cup	4	2	2
Total	25	12	9
World Championships
Gold medal – first place	2022 Sofia	Group All-Around
Gold medal – first place	2022 Sofia	3 ribbons + 2 balls
Gold medal – first place	2023 Valencia	Team
Silver medal – second place	2025 Rio de Janeiro	Team
European Championships
Gold medal – first place	2022 Tel Aviv	Team
Gold medal – first place	2023 Baku	Group All-Around
Gold medal – first place	2023 Baku	Team
Gold medal – first place	2024 Budapest	Group All-Around
Gold medal – first place	2024 Budapest	Team
Gold medal – first place	2026 Varna	Team
Silver medal – second place	2023 Baku	5 Hoops
European Cup
Gold medal – first place	2024 Baku	3 Ribbons + 2 Balls
Gold medal – first place	2025 Baku	Cross Battle
Gold medal – first place	2025 Burgas	3 Balls & 2 Hoops
Gold medal – first place	2026 Baku	Cross Battle
Silver medal – second place	2025 Burgas	Cross Battle
Silver medal – second place	2025 Burgas	5 Ribbons
Bronze medal – third place	2024 Baku	5 Hoops
Bronze medal – third place	2025 Baku	5 Ribbons

Sofia Ivanova (Bulgarian: София Иванова; born 15 September 2005) is a Bulgarian rhythmic gymnast. She is a world champion with the Bulgarian team in World Championships 2022 in Sofia and world champion with 3 ribbons+2 balls. She is the European all-around champion and team champion with the Bulgarian team in 2023 and 2024, as well as a silver medalist in the 5-hoop final. She won gold in the senior team competition at the 2022 European Championships.

== Career ==
=== Junior ===
She first entered the spotlight in 2017, when she entered the national team and started to attend competitions abroad.

=== Senior ===
In 2021 Ivanova started competing in the senior category, winning bronze in the national championship and gold in the team competition. She competed at minor tournaments, like the Sofia cup and the Irina Deleanu cup as she was not considered among the top individuals.

In late 2021 Ivanova was included in the group. In 2022, when the girls of the previous group retired after becoming Olympic champions, she became a starter in the two routines. Her first competition was the Grand Prix in Marbella, Spain. The group then took part in the World Cup stages in Sofia (All-Around and 5 hoops gold, silver with 3 ribbons + 2 balls), Tashkent (All-Around and 5 hoops gold, bronze with 3 ribbons + 2 balls), Pesaro (All-Around and 3 ribbons + 2 balls silver and 5 hoops bronze), Pamplona (bronze with 5 hoops and silver with 3 ribbons + 2 balls) and Cluj-Napoca (All-Around, 5 hoops and 3 ribbons + 2 balls gold). In June she was part of the group for the European Championship in Tel Aviv, she won gold in the senior team category along with Vaya Draganova, Zhenina Trashlieva, Kamelia Petrova, Rachel Stoyanov, Margarita Vasileva and the individuals Boryana Kaleyn and Stiliana Nikolova.

In 2023 the group started in Marbella, where she won the All-Around as well as the gold medals in the finals with 5 hoops and with 2 balls and 3 ribbons. Later they won All-Around silver at the World Cup in Athens, they won gold in the same category two weeks later in Sofia. At the 2023 European Championships, held in Baku, she won gold medals in both Group All-around and Team competition. In 5 Hoops final, she won silver medal and placed 5th in 3 Ribbons + 2 Balls final.

In March 2024 Sofia and the group were 5th in the All-Around and 6th with 2 balls and 3 ribbons at the World Cup in Athens. In April the girls won bronze in the All-Around and silver with 3 ribbons and 2 balls in Sofia. In June, Sofia and the group won gold medal in the All-around at the 2024 European Championships in Budapest, Hungary. They also won gold in Team event, together with Boryana Kaleyn, Elvira Krasnobaeva and Stiliana Nikolova. They placed 4th in 5 Hoops final and 8th in 3 Ribbons + 2 Balls final. In August she was selected for the Olympic Games in Paris, where Sofia, Kamelia Petrova, Margarita Vasileva, Rachel Stoyanov and Magdalina Minevska, took 4th place in the final after making mistakes in the 5 hoops routine. In October, all Ivanova's teammates announced their decision to retire, leaving her as the only old member in the new national team. However, in December it was announced that Rachel Stoyanov also had decided to continue after undergoing surgery on her meniscus.

Ivanova is the captain of the current Bulgarian group consisting of Rachel Stoyanov, Viktoria Georgieva, Sofia Pavlova, Suzan Pouladian, Alina Kolomiets, Ivon Boshkilova and Danaya Atanasova. In April 2025 the new group debuted at their domestic World Cup stage in Sofia, being 4th in the All-Around and winning gold with 5 ribbons. In May, they won gold medals in cross battle at both European Cups (Baku, Burgas). Next month, they competed at the 2025 European Championships in Tallinn, Estonia. Due to many mistakes in both routines, they finished on 15th place in all-around and failed to qualify to apparatus finals. In July, the group won bronze medal in 5 Ribbons final of World Challenge Cup in Cluj-Napoca. In August she was selected to compete at the 2025 World Championships in Rio de Janeiro, Brazil along Rachel Stoyanov, Danaya Atanasova, Alina Kolomiets and Emilia Obretenova. They took 6th place in the All-Around, after a drop in mixed routine, winning silver in the team event together with Eva Brezalieva and Stiliana Nikolova.

In 2026, Ivanova, Magdalina Minevska and Emilia Obretenova remained in the group together with newcomers Raya Bozhilova and Magdalena Valkova. On March 28–30, they competed at Sofia World Cup, and won bronze medal in all-around. In Baku they were 8th in the All-Around, 12th with 5 balls and took bronze with 3 hoops & 4 clubs. In May, the team competed at the 2026 European Championships in Varna, Bulgaria. They took 6th place in group all-around competition, and qualified to 5 Balls final, where they were 8th. They won gold medal in team competition alongside Eva Brezalieva and Stiliana Nikolova.

== Detailed Olympic results ==
Year	Competition Description	Location	Music	Apparatus	Rank	Score-Final	Rank	Score-Qualifying
2024	Olympics	Paris		All-around	4th	67.800	1st	70.400
2024	Olympics	Paris	Chi Mai, Dona Is Sick by Ennio Morricone, Bulgarian Voices	5 Hoops	7th	34.100	2nd	37.700
2024	Olympics	Paris	Someone else (Acapella)' by Allegro	3 Ribbons + 2 Balls	1st	33.700	2nd	32.700
