= Kamelia Petrova =

Bulgarian rhythmic gymnast

- Камелия Петрова
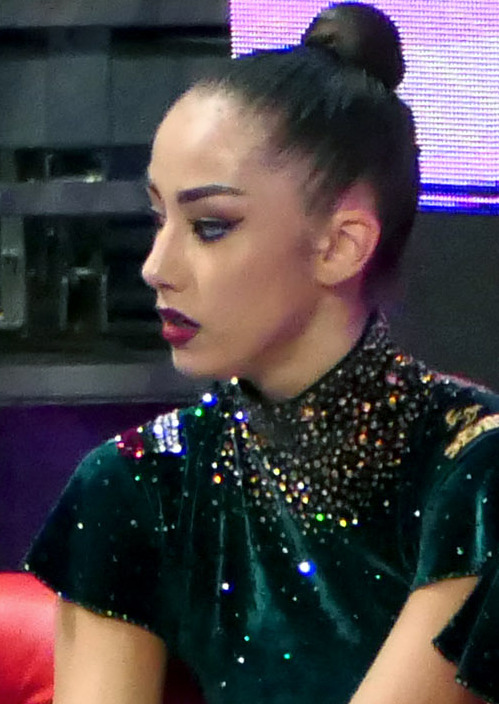
- Petrova in 2024

Personal information
- Born: 1 May 2006 (age 20) Sofia, Bulgaria

Gymnastics career
- Discipline: Rhythmic gymnastics
- Country represented: Bulgaria (2020-2024)
- Club: Levski
- Head coach: Vesela Dimitrova
- Assistant coaches: Mihaela Maevska, Yasena Stoyneva
- Former coaches: Eva Gogova, Valentina Simeonova, Vyara Vatashka, Cvetelina Naydenova
- Choreographer: Margarita Budinova
- Retired: yes
Medal record
Representing Bulgaria
Event	1st	2nd	3rd
World Championships	3	0	0
European Championships	5	1	0
Grand Prix Series	3	2	1
FIG World Cup	4	5	2
FIG European Cup	1	0	1
Junior European Championships	0	3	0
Total	16	11	4
Rhythmic Gymnastics
Representing Bulgaria
World Championships
Gold medal – first place	2022 Sofia	Group All-Around
Gold medal – first place	2022 Sofia	3 Ribbons + 2 Balls
Gold medal – first place	2023 Valencia	Team
European Championships
Gold medal – first place	2022 Tel Aviv	Team
Gold medal – first place	2023 Baku	Group All-Around
Gold medal – first place	2023 Baku	Team
Gold medal – first place	2024 Budapest	Group All-Around
Gold medal – first place	2024 Budapest	Team
Silver medal – second place	2023 Baku	5 Hoops
European Cup
Gold medal – first place	2024 Baku	3 Ribbons + 2 Balls
Bronze medal – third place	2024 Baku	5 Hoops
Junior European Championships
Silver medal – second place	2021 Varna	All-Around
Silver medal – second place	2021 Varna	5 Balls
Silver medal – second place	2021 Varna	5 Ribbons

Kamelia Petrova (Bulgarian: Камелия Петрова; born 1 May 2006) is a retired Bulgarian rhythmic gymnast. She is the 2022 World group all-around champion, a two-time (2023, 2024) European group all-around champion and a three-time (2022–2024) European Team champion. As a junior, she is the 2021 European group all-around silver medalist.

== Personal life ==
Petrova started practicing rhythmic gymnastics at the age of 6, along her sister, encouraged by her mother, a former athlete. Petrova's favorite school subject is maths. Her motto is "God loves the brave".

== Career ==
=== Junior ===
Petrova was selected for the 2020-2021 junior group along with Kristiana Doycheva, Suzan Pouladian, Maria Stamenova, Gergana Trendafilova and Aleksandra Vasileva. In February they competed at the 2021 Moscow Grand Prix, winning all the silver medals. They followed this with a bronze with 5 balls at the Deleanu Cup. In June the team won three silver medals 2021 Junior European Championships in the all-around and event finals.

=== Senior ===
In 2022, when the gymnasts comprising the previous senior group retired after becoming Olympic champions, Petrova began competing in both senior group routines beginning at the World Cup in Pesaro. There, the group won silver in the all-around and the 3 ribbons + 2 balls final and bronze with 5 hoops. She also took part in the World Cup stages in Pamplona (bronze with 5 hoops and silver with 3 ribbons + 2 balls) and Cluj-Napoca (all-around, 5 hoops and 3 ribbons + 2 balls gold).

In June she was part of the group competing at the European Championship in Tel Aviv. She won gold in the senior team category along with her teammates, Vaya Draganova, Zhenina Trashlieva, Sofia Ivanova, Rachel Stoyanov, Margarita Vasileva, and the individuals Boryana Kaleyn and Stiliana Nikolova.

In 2023 the group began their season at the Grand Prix stage in Marbella. Petrova won gold in the all-around as well as in both event finals. They went on to win silver in the all-around at the World Cup in Athens, and they won gold in the same category two weeks later at the World Cup in Sofia.

At the 2023 European Championships, held in Baku, Petrova and her group won gold medals in both the all-around and team competition, together with Boryana Kaleyn, Stiliana Nikolova and Eva Brezalieva. In the 5 hoops final, she won the silver medal, and she placed 5th in the 3 ribbons + 2 balls final.

In March 2024 the group were 5th in the all-around and 6th with 2 balls and 3 ribbons at the World Cup in Athens. In April, they won bronze in the all-around and silver with 3 ribbons and 2 balls at the World Cup in Sofia. In June, they won the gold medal in the all-around at the 2024 European Championships in Budapest, Hungary. They also won gold in the Team event, together with Boryana Kaleyn, Elvira Krasnobaeva and Stiliana Nikolova. They placed fourth in the 5 hoops final and 8th in the 3 ribbons + 2 balls final.

In August, Petrova was selected to compete in the group at the Olympic Games in Paris, where she, Margarita Vasileva, Sofia Ivanova, Rachel Stoyanov and Magdalina Minevska, took fourth place in the final after making mistakes in their 5 hoops routine. She competed with severe pains in her legs due to serious injuries.

In October she announced she had made the decision to retire, along with Vasileva, Minevska and Stoyanov. However, in December it was announced that Rachel Stoyanov had decided to continue after undergoing surgery on her meniscus. So, Stoyanov is included in the new national team along with her old teammate Sofia Ivanova who is the captain of the group.

== Detailed Olympic results ==
Year	Competition Description	Location	Music	Apparatus	Rank	Score-Final	Rank	Score-Qualifying
2024	Olympics	Paris		All-around	4th	67.800	1st	70.400
2024	Olympics	Paris	Chi Mai, Dona Is Sick by Ennio Morricone, Bulgarian Voices	5 Hoops	7th	34.100	2nd	37.700
2024	Olympics	Paris	Someone else (Acapella)' by Allegro	3 Ribbons + 2 Balls	1st	33.700	2nd	32.700

== See also ==
- List of medalists at the Rhythmic Gymnastics Junior European Championships
