= Magdalina Minevska =

Bulgarian rhythmic gymnast (born 2005)

- Магдалина Миневска
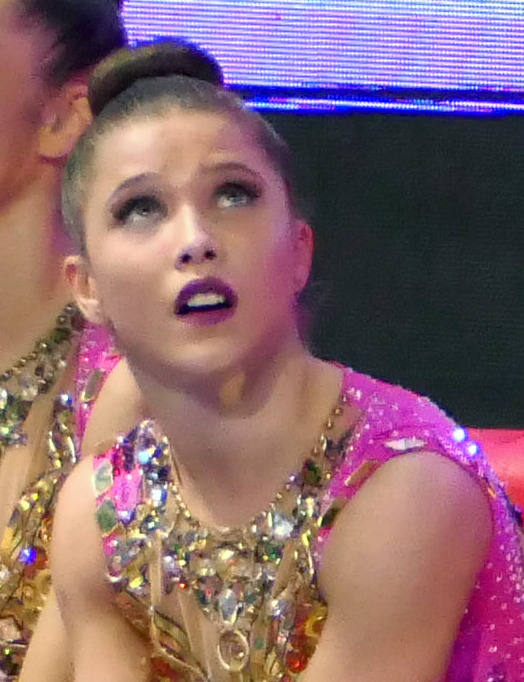
- Minevska in 2024

Personal information
- Nickname: Maggie
- Born: 2 December 2005 (age 20) Sofia, Bulgaria

Gymnastics career
- Discipline: Rhythmic gymnastics
- Country represented: Bulgaria; (2020-2024, 2026-)
- Club: Iliana
- Head coach: Vesela Dimitrova
- Assistant coaches: Mihaela Maevska, Yasena Stoyneva
- Former coaches: Violeta Masterska, Violeta Gospodorska
- Choreographer: Margarita Budinova
Medal record
Representing Bulgaria
Event	1st	2nd	3rd
European Championships	3	0	0
FIG World Cup	0	1	4
European Cup	2	0	1
Total	5	1	5
Rhythmic Gymnastics
Representing Bulgaria
World Championships
Silver medal – second place	2026 Frankfurt	Team
Bronze medal – third place	2026 Frankfurt	5 Balls
European Championships
Gold medal – first place	2024 Budapest	Group All-Around
Gold medal – first place	2024 Budapest	Team
Gold medal – first place	2026 Varna	Team
European Cup
Gold medal – first place	2024 Baku	3 Ribbons + 2 Balls
Gold medal – first place	2026 Baku	Cross Battle
Bronze medal – third place	2024 Baku	5 Hoops

Magdalina Minevska (Bulgarian: Магдалина Миневска; born 2 December 2005) is a Bulgarian rhythmic gymnast. She is a 2024 European Group All-Around champion with the Bulgarian team as well as Team champion.

== Biography ==
In 2020 she won silver in the national clubs championships as a member of Levski Iliana along Sofia Ivanova and Monika Mladenova. At the individual championships she took 8th place in the All-Around. The following year she won silver in the group championships along Rosena Nikolova, Anastasia Yosifova, Savina Kovacheva, and Kristen Stoilova.

=== 2024 Olympic cyle ===
In early February 2022 she took third place in the national control training behind Eva Brezalieva and Sofia Ivanova. At the second control she was 5th. At the Aphrodite Cup in Greece she won silver in the All-Around, as well as with hoop and ribbon and gold with clubs. At the Sofia Cup she won silver with clubs. As a member of Ilana she won the national clubs championships along Nikola Atanasova, Iva Vitkinova and Tatyana Volozhanina and was 4th in the individual championships. In May Magdalina won bronze with clubs, behind Darja Varfolomeev and Adi Asya Katz, at the World Challenge Cup in Portimão.

In 2023 she won gold in the National clubs championships with Ilana. She then took part in the Gymnastik International where she finished 4th in the All-Around, she was again 4th with hoop, clubs and ribbon and 8th with ball. In March she was selected for the Sofia Cup. In April she competed at the World Cup in Tashkent, being 12th in the All-Around and with hoop, 16th with ball, 7th with clubs and 11th with ribbon.

In 2024 she switched from individuals to the group modality. At the first World Cup of the season in Athens Magdalina, Sofia Ivanova, Kamelia Petrova, Rachel Stoyanov and Margarita Vasileva were 5th in the All-Around and 6th in the 3 ribbons & 2 balls' final. At the stage in Sofia the group won bronze in the All-Around and silver with 3 ribbons & 2 balls. In Baku they took 4th place in the All-Around, 6th with 5 hoops and 4th with 3 ribbons & 2 balls. In early May she competed with the group in the 1st Rhythmic Gymnastics European Cup, being 4th in the All-Around and winning bronze with 5 hoop and gold with 3 ribbons & 2 balls. In June, Magdalina and the group won gold medal in the All-around at the 2024 European Championships in Budapest, Hungary. They also won gold in Team event, together with Boryana Kaleyn, Elvira Krasnobaeva and Stiliana Nikolova. They placed 4th in 5 Hoops final and 8th in 3 Ribbons + 2 Balls final.

In August she was selected for the Olympic Games in Paris, where Magdalina, Kamelia Petrova, Sofia Ivanova, Rachel Stoyanov and Margarita Vasileva, took 4th place in the final after making mistakes in the 5 hoops routine. In October she announced she made the decision to retire along Vasileva, Petrova and Stoyanov.

=== 2028 Olympic cycle ===
However, as of 2026, Minevska is included in the new national team along with her old teammate Sofia Ivanova who is the captain of the group. On March 28-30, they competed at Sofia World Cup, and won bronze medal in all-around. At Baku World Cup they were 8th in the All-Around, 12th with 5 balls and took bronze with 3 hoops & 4 clubs. In May, the team competed at the 2026 European Championships in Varna, Bulgaria. They took 6th place in group all-around competition, and qualified to 5 Balls final, where they were 8th. They won gold medal in team competition alongside Eva Brezalieva and Stiliana Nikolova. In August, she was chosen to represent Bulgaria alongside Raya Bozhilova, Margarita Vasileva, Emilia Obretenova and Rachel Stoyanov at the 2026 World Championships in Frankfurt, Germany. In group all-around competition they finished off the podium, on 6th place, due to mistakes in 5 Balls routine. They won bronze medals in both apparatus finals and silver medal in team competition alongside Eva Brezalieva and Stiliana Nikolova.

== Detailed Olympic results ==
Year	Competition Description	Location	Music	Apparatus	Rank	Score-Final	Rank	Score-Qualifying
2024	Olympics	Paris		All-around	4th	67.800	1st	70.400
2024	Olympics	Paris	Chi Mai, Dona Is Sick by Ennio Morricone, Bulgarian Voices	5 Hoops	7th	34.100	2nd	37.700
2024	Olympics	Paris	Someone else (Acapella)' by Allegro	3 Ribbons + 2 Balls	1st	33.700	2nd	32.700
