= Vaya Draganova =

Bulgarian rhythmic gymnast (born 2003)

- Born: 25 September 2003 (age 23) Kyustendil, Bulgaria

Gymnastics career
- Discipline: Rhythmic gymnastics
- Country represented: Bulgaria; (2017-2023)
- Club: Levski Triaditsa
- Head coach: Vesela Dimitrova
- Assistant coach: Mihaela Maevska
- Choreographer: Margarita Budinova
Medal record
Representing Bulgaria
Event	1st	2nd	3rd
Grand Prix	0	1	3
FIG World Cup	7	4	2
European Championships	1	0	0
Total	8	5	6
European Championships
Gold medal – first place	2022 Tel Aviv	Team

Vaya Draganova (Bulgarian: Вая Драганова; born 25 September 2003) is a retired Bulgarian rhythmic gymnast. She is a 2022 European Champion in teams.

== Career ==
=== Junior ===
She started competing internationally in 2017 as an individual. In 2018 she was among the girls that competed to represent Bulgaria at the Youth Olympic Games, but she didn't succeed in getting the spot, that went to Tatyana Volozhanina.

=== Senior ===
In 2019 she was included in the national senior team, getting to compete at various World Cups, Grand Prix and tournaments. In late 2020 Draganova was included in the group. In 2022, when the girls of the previous group retired after becoming Olympic champions, she became a starter in the two routines. Her first competition was the Grand Prix in Marbella, Spain. The group then took part in the World Cup stages in Sofia (All-Around and 5 hoops gold, silver with 3 ribbons + 2 balls), Tashkent (All-Around and 5 hoops gold, bronze with 3 ribbons + 2 balls), Pesaro (All-Around and 3 ribbons + 2 balls silver and 5 hoops bronze), Pamplona (bronze with 5 hoops and silver with 3 ribbons + 2 balls) and Cluji-Napoca (All-Around, 5 hoops and 3 ribbons + 2 balls gold). In June she was part of the group for the European Championship in Tel Aviv, she won gold in the senior team category along with Zhenina Trashlieva, Sofia Ivanova, Kamelia Petrova, Rachel Stoyanov, Margarita Vasileva and the individuals Boryana Kaleyn and Stiliana Nikolova.
