= Zhenina Trashlieva =

Bulgarian rhythmic gymnast

- Женина Трашлиева
- Born: 14 April 1997 (age 29) Burgas, Bulgaria

Gymnastics career
- Discipline: Rhythmic gymnastics
- Country represented: Bulgaria; (2013-2017, 2020-present)
- Club: Chernomorets
- Head coach: Vesela Dimitrova
- Assistant coach: Mihaela Maevska
- Former coaches: Hristina Georgieva, Rositsa Ivanova
- Choreographer: Margarita Budinova
Medal record
Representing Bulgaria
Event	1st	2nd	3rd
World Championships	3	0	0
European Championships	3	1	0
FIG World Cup	8	5	3
Grand Prix	1	1	3
Total	15	7	6
World Championships
Gold medal – first place	2022 Sofia	Group All-Around
Gold medal – first place	2022 Sofia	3 Ribbons + 2 Balls
Gold medal – first place	2023 Valencia	Team
European Championships
Gold medal – first place	2022 Tel Aviv	Team
Gold medal – first place	2023 Baku	Group All-Around
Gold medal – first place	2023 Baku	Team
Silver medal – second place	2023 Baku	5 Hoops

Zhenina Trashileva (Bulgarian: Женина Трашлиева; born 14 April 1997) is a Bulgarian rhythmic gymnast. She is world champion in All-Around with the Bulgarian team and world champion in the final with 3 ribbons+2 balls in 2022 World Championships. She is European Champion with Team Bulgaria at the 2023 European Championships and Team Champion as well as silver medalist in the Five Hoops Final. Zhenina is also a team champion with the Bulgarian team at the European Championship in 2022 in Tel Aviv.

== Career ==
Trashileva had been part of the Bulgarian national team competing internationally since 2012, including the 2012 junior European Championships.

In 2013 she was invited to integrate the senior individuals by the national coordinator, Efrosina Angelova. Zhenina competed mainly nationally, not managing to breakthrough the national ranking. In 2015 Trashileva had a fallout with Angelova, causing her expulsion from the national team, the motivation given was "a systematic violation of discipline, non-compliance with the instructions of the coaches and the creation of an unfavorable atmosphere, which interferes with the normal course of the training process".

However a year later, in July 2016, Zhenina was invited to take part in the national group selection for the 2017-2020 Olympic cycle. She was made a reserve and continued to compete individually in Bulgaria and also in Italy under the team "Evoluzione Danza".

In 2022, when the girls of the previous group retired after becoming Olympic champions, she became a starter in the two routines. Her first competition was the Grand Prix in Marbella, Spain. The group then took part in the World Cup stages in Sofia (All-Around and 5 hoops gold, silver with 3 ribbons + 2 balls), Tashkent (All-Around and 5 hoops gold, bronze with 3 ribbons + 2 balls), Pesaro (All-Around and 3 ribbons + 2 balls silver and 5 hoops bronze), Pamplona (bronze with 5 hoops and silver with 3 ribbons + 2 balls) and Cluji-Napoca (All-Around, 5 hoops and 3 ribbons + 2 balls gold). In June she was part of the group for the European Championship in Tel Aviv, she won gold in the senior team category along with Vaya Draganova, Sofia Ivanova, Kamelia Petrova, Rachel Stoyanov, Margarita Vasileva and the individuals Boryana Kaleyn and Stiliana Nikolova. At the 2022 World Championships in Sofia, she and her teammates won the All-around, as well as the gold medals in the 2-ball and 3-ribbons combination.

The 2023 season started in Marbella, where she won the All-Around with the Bulgarian team, as well as the gold medals in the finals with 5 hoops and with 2 balls and 3 ribbons.

At the World Cup in Athens 2023, she, together with the Bulgarian team, won the silver medal in the All-around.

At the World Cup in Sofia 2023, she and girls from the Bulgarian team won the gold medal in the All-Around.

At the European Championship in 2023, Zhenina and the Bulgarian team became champions in the all-around, as well as team champions. She is also a silver medalist in the five-hoop final.
