= Karen Ruimy =

Moroccan-born author and spiritual teacher

Karen Benhamou Ruimy
- Born: May 17, 1965
- Education: ESSEC Business School
- Occupations: Author; philanthropist; spiritual teacher; dancer; singer
- Years active: 1987 - present
- Spouse: Ely Michel Ruimy
- Website: karenruimy.com

Karen Ruimy is a Moroccan-born author and spiritual teacher who is founder of the lifestyle brand Kalmar. She started in 1987 as a banker in mergers and acquisitions at CCF-HSBC then became a director of FINACOR at the age of 28. She changed careers at age 30 to become a spiritual author. She wrote The Angel’s Metamorphosis, published in France in 2000 and an English-language version in 2010 by Quartet Books. She then published The Voice of the Angel in 2012, a collection of spiritual writings designed to guide the reader on a voyage to the soul.

Ruimy founded The Goddess Manifestation Circle, a community for spiritual healing and high vibrational living.

In 2010 Ruimy set up the GREAT (Gender Rights Equality Action Trust) Initiative with broadcaster Mariella Frostrup and human rights lawyer Jason McCue. This charity helped to write and pass the Gender Equality Act in England. As the founder of wellness brand Kalmar, she partners with Forest Carbon, Women for Women International, Black Minds Matter, and NHS Charities Together for their environmental and social sustainability efforts.

In November 2013 Ruimy co-founded the Marrakech Museum of Photography and Visual Arts (MMPVA). She has also been invited to sit on the board of Tate, Outset and the ICA and is a patron of Serpentine.

Ruimy is a contributor to the UK's Psychologies Magazine, for which she has conducted a series of interviews, including with Eva Longoria. She is also part of their expert LifeLab series. Ruimy is a regular contributor to The Huffington Post and Harper’s Bazaar's online Arts Channel.

== Early life and family ==
Ruimy was born in Casablanca, Morocco. Her family moved to Paris when she was seven. She earned an MBA at the Grand École ESSEC in Paris. During her studies, she learned flamenco dance with Adrian y Blanca from Seville.

She mostly lives in London, and frequently travels to Paris, Morocco, Los Angeles and Arizona.

== Music and dance ==
Ruimy became a professional flamenco dancer at the age of 35. She has produced dance shows called Flamen'ka at Casino de Paris, Flamen’ka Nueva at Folies Bergeres, Cabaret Flamen'ka at La Cigale, Sangre (directed and choreographed by Redha Benterifour; opened at the Riverside Studios),), Zik’r (co-produced and co-written by Martin Glover; performed at the World Sufi Spirit Festival in Jodphur, India), ZIK'r (also created with Martin Glover; performed at Sufi Sutra Festival in India), the Marrakech Biennale, Sadler's Wells Lilian Baylis, Union Chapel, La Linea Festival at The Peacock Theatre, and When Jazz Meets Flamenco in Sadler’s Wells, London.

Ruimy has released the following albums: Essence de Femme, and Come With Me, which were recorded at Peter Gabriel’s Real World Studios with Justin Adams. The album was co-written with Adams and produced by Martin Glover. A version of "Shake it Up" featured on the Telegraph Live Music Sessions. In 2021, she released Black Coffee, a trajectory into jazz territory featuring six tracks sung in English and French, with legendary producer and Grammy awards winner Phil Ramone and Martin Glover and producer-musician Tim Bran.

In 2022, Ruimy co-created and performed House of Flamenka with dance director Arlene Phillips, and choreographers James Cousins and Francisco Hidalgo. The show was a mixture of modern dance and flamenco with a multi-level performance space designed by Jasmine Swan. The concept behind the show is set in a fantasy world of a Goddess of Music and Dance who adores collecting beautiful objects – depicted by the 22 dancers and musicians. It delivered elements of traditional flamenco with opulent boudoir and individual artistry. The final section of the show channeled celebration in a Flamenco fiesta.

== Activism ==
In 2015 Ruimy signed an open letter by the ONE Campaign to Angela Merkel and Nkosazana Dlamini-Zuma, urging them to focus on women as they serve as the head of the G7 in Germany and the AU in South Africa respectively, which will start to set the priorities in development funding before a main UN summit in September 2015 that will establish new development goals for the generation.

== Founder of Kalmar ==
Founded by Ruimy in 2016, Kalmar is a London-based wellness brand built on the values of wellbeing and self-care.

== Works ==
- The Angel’s Metamorphosis (France, 2000, ISBN 9782844451149 and in UK, 2010, IBN 070437188X )
- The Voice of the Angel, IBN 070437286X (2012)
- Deep Healing of the Inner Child: Virtual Webinar and Activation (2021)
- Healing of the Inner Child Workshop at Mind Body Spirit Festival London (2022)
- Flamen'ka at Casino de Paris
- Flamen’ka Nueva at Folies Bergeres Cabaret
- Flamen'ka at La Cigale, Sangre
- Zik’r at World Sufi Spirit Festival in Jodphur, India
- ZIK'rat Sufi Sutra Festival in India, the Marrakech Biennale, Sadler's Wells Lilian Baylis, Union Chapel
- La Linea Festival at The Peacock Theatre
- When Jazz Meets Flamenco in Sadler’s Wells, London
- Essence de Femme
- Come With Me
- "Shake it Up" on Telegraph Live Music Sessions.
- Black Coffee (2021)
- House of Flamenka
