= 2024 FIG Rhythmic Gymnastics World Cup series =

International gymnastics contest

FIG Rhythmic Gymnastics World Cup series
- Location: various — see locations
- Date: March 22 – July 14, 2024 see schedule

The 2024 FIG World Cup circuit in Rhythmic Gymnastics was a series of competitions officially organized and promoted by the International Gymnastics Federation.

== Formats ==
World Cup
| Date | Event | Location | Type |
| March 22–24 | FIG World Cup 2024 | (Greece) Athens | Individuals and groups |
| April 12–14 | FIG World Cup 2024 | (Bulgaria) Sofia | Individuals and groups |
| April 19–21 | FIG World Cup 2024 | (Azerbaijan) Baku | Individuals and groups |
| April 26–28 | FIG World Cup 2024 | (Uzbekistan) Tashkent | Individuals and groups |
| June 21–23 | FIG World Cup 2024 | (Italy) Milan | Individuals and groups |

World Challenge Cup
| May 10–12 | FIG World Challenge Cup 2024 | (Portugal) Portimão | Individuals and groups |
| ~~June 26–28~~ | ~~FIG World Challenge Cup 2024~~ | ~~(Israel) Jerusalem~~ | ~~Individuals and groups~~ |
| July 12–14 | FIG World Challenge Cup 2023 | (Romania) Cluj Napoca | Individuals and groups |

== Medal winners ==
=== All-around ===
==== Individual ====
| Competitions | Gold | Silver | Bronze |
|---|---|---|---|
World Cup
| Athens | (Bulgaria) Elvira Krasnobaeva | (Bulgaria) Eva Brezalieva | (Individual Neutral Athletes) Alina Harnasko |
| Sofia | (Bulgaria) Boryana Kaleyn | (Bulgaria) Stiliana Nikolova | (Israel) Daria Atamanov |
| Baku | (Germany) Darja Varfolomeev | (Bulgaria) Elvira Krasnobaeva | (Italy) Sofia Raffaeli |
| Tashkent | (Germany) Darja Varfolomeev | (Uzbekistan) Takhmina Ikromova | (Bulgaria) Boryana Kaleyn |
| Milan | (Germany) Darja Varfolomeev | (Italy) Sofia Raffaeli | (Ukraine) Viktoriia Onopriienko |
World Challenge Cup
| Portimão | (Germany) Darja Varfolomeev | (Individual Neutral Athletes) Alina Harnasko | (Spain) Alba Bautista |
| Cluj Napoca | (Bulgaria) Stiliana Nikolova | (Germany) Darja Varfolomeev | (Israel) Daria Atamanov |

==== Group ====
| Competitions | Gold | Silver | Bronze |
|---|---|---|---|
World Cup
| Athens | Israel | China | Italy |
| Sofia | Israel | Italy | Bulgaria |
| Baku | Spain | Italy | Azerbaijan |
| Tashkent | China | France | Poland |
| Milan | China | Brazil | Italy |
World Challenge Cup
| Portimão | Spain | Brazil | France |
| Cluj Napoca | Bulgaria | Brazil | Israel |

=== Apparatus ===
==== Hoop ====
| Competitions | Gold | Silver | Bronze |
|---|---|---|---|
World Cup
| Athens | (Bulgaria) Elvira Krasnobaeva | (Italy) Sofia Raffaeli | (Poland) Liliana Lewińska |
| Sofia | (Israel) Daria Atamanov | (Bulgaria) Stiliana Nikolova | (Italy) Sofia Raffaeli |
| Baku | (Germany) Darja Varfolomeev | (Italy) Sofia Raffaeli | (Bulgaria) Eva Brezalieva |
| Tashkent | (Uzbekistan) Takhmina Ikromova | (Germany) Darja Varfolomeev | (Bulgaria) Boryana Kaleyn |
| Milan | (China) Wang Zilu | (Individual Neutral Athletes) Alina Harnasko | (Uzbekistan) Takhmina Ikromova |
World Challenge Cup
| Portimão | (Germany) Darja Varfolomeev | (Kazakhstan) Milana Parfilova | (Individual Neutral Athletes) Alina Harnasko |
| Cluj Napoca | (Israel) Daria Atamanov | (Bulgaria) Stiliana Nikolova | (Germany) Margarita Kolosov |

==== Ball ====
| Competitions | Gold | Silver | Bronze |
|---|---|---|---|
World Cup
| Athens | (Israel) Daniela Munits | (Italy) Sofia Raffaeli | (Bulgaria) Eva Brezalieva |
| Sofia | (Bulgaria) Stiliana Nikolova | (Uzbekistan) Takhmina Ikromova | (Israel) Daria Atamanov |
| Baku | (Germany) Darja Varfolomeev | (Bulgaria) Eva Brezalieva | (Ukraine) Taisiia Onofriichuk |
| Tashkent | (Uzbekistan) Takhmina Ikromova | (Germany) Darja Varfolomeev | (Germany) Margarita Kolosov |
| Milan | (Germany) Darja Varfolomeev | (Italy) Sofia Raffaeli | (Uzbekistan) Takhmina Ikromova |
World Challenge Cup
| Portimão | (Individual Neutral Athletes) Alina Harnasko | (Kazakhstan) Erika Zhailauova | (Slovenia) Ekaterina Vedeneeva |
| Cluj Napoca | (Germany) Darja Varfolomeev | (Bulgaria) Stiliana Nikolova | (Bulgaria) Boryana Kaleyn |

==== Clubs ====
| Competitions | Gold | Silver | Bronze |
|---|---|---|---|
World Cup
| Athens | (China) Wang Zilu | (Bulgaria) Elvira Krasnobaeva | (Bulgaria) Eva Brezalieva |
| Sofia | (Italy) Sofia Raffaeli | (Bulgaria) Boryana Kaleyn | (Ukraine) Viktoriia Onopriienko |
| Baku | (Italy) Sofia Raffaeli | (Ukraine) Taisiia Onofriichuk | (Germany) Darja Varfolomeev |
| Tashkent | (Germany) Darja Varfolomeev | (Uzbekistan) Takhmina Ikromova | (Uzbekistan) Nataliya Usova |
| Milan | (Germany) Darja Varfolomeev | (Italy) Sofia Raffaeli | (Ukraine) Taisiia Onofriichuk |
World Challenge Cup
| Portimão | (Germany) Darja Varfolomeev | (Individual Neutral Athletes) Alina Harnasko | (Slovenia) Ekaterina Vedeneeva |
| Cluj Napoca | (Germany) Darja Varfolomeev | (Bulgaria) Stiliana Nikolova | (Israel) Daria Atamanov |

==== Ribbon ====
| Competitions | Gold | Silver | Bronze |
|---|---|---|---|
World Cup
| Athens | (Individual Neutral Athletes) Alina Harnasko | (Bulgaria) Elvira Krasnobaeva | (Cyprus) Vera Tugolukova |
| Sofia | (Bulgaria) Stiliana Nikolova | (Israel) Daria Atamanov | (Ukraine) Taisiia Onofriichuk |
| Baku | (Germany) Darja Varfolomeev | (Bulgaria) Elvira Krasnobaeva | (Ukraine) Taisiia Onofriichuk |
| Tashkent | (Germany) Darja Varfolomeev | (Uzbekistan) Takhmina Ikromova | (Poland) Liliana Lewinska |
| Milan | (Italy) Sofia Raffaeli | (Germany) Darja Varfolomeev | (Ukraine) Taisiia Onofriichuk |
World Challenge Cup
| Portimão | (Germany) Darja Varfolomeev | (Slovenia) Ekaterina Vedeneeva | (Kazakhstan) Milana Parfilova |
| Cluj Napoca | (Ukraine) Taisiia Onofriichuk | (Hungary) Fanni Pigniczki | (Brazil) Bárbara Domingos |

==== 5 Hoops ====
| Competitions | Gold | Silver | Bronze |
|---|---|---|---|
World Cup
| Athens | Italy | Israel | China |
| Sofia | Israel | Spain | Mexico |
| Baku | Japan | Italy | Azerbaijan |
| Tashkent | China | Poland | Germany |
| Milan | Italy | Brazil | China |
World Challenge Cup
| Portimão | Spain | Brazil | France |
| Cluj Napoca | Israel | Italy | Bulgaria |

==== 3 Ribbons and 2 Balls ====
| Competitions | Gold | Silver | Bronze |
|---|---|---|---|
World Cup
| Athens | Poland | Italy | China |
| Sofia | Israel | Bulgaria | Poland |
| Baku | Japan | Spain | Italy |
| Tashkent | France | Uzbekistan | Poland |
| Milan | China | France | Ukraine |
World Challenge Cup
| Portimão | Brazil | Mexico | Spain |
| Cluj Napoca | Spain | France | Ukraine |

== Overall medal table ==
| Rank | Nation | Gold | Silver | Bronze | Total |
|---|---|---|---|---|---|
| 1 | Germany (GER) | 16 | 4 | 4 | 24 |
| 2 | Israel (ISR) | 8 | 2 | 5 | 15 |
| 3 | Bulgaria (BUL) | 7 | 13 | 8 | 28 |
| 4 | China (CHN) | 6 | 1 | 3 | 10 |
| 5 | Italy (ITA) | 5 | 11 | 5 | 21 |
| 6 | Spain (ESP) | 4 | 2 | 2 | 8 |
| 7 | Uzbekistan (UZB) | 2 | 5 | 3 | 10 |
| 8 | Individual Neutral Athletes (AIN) | 2 | 3 | 2 | 7 |
| 9 | Japan (JPN) | 2 | 0 | 0 | 2 |
| 10 | Brazil (BRA) | 1 | 5 | 1 | 7 |
| 11 | France (FRA) | 1 | 3 | 2 | 6 |
| 12 | Ukraine (UKR) | 1 | 1 | 9 | 11 |
| 13 | Poland (POL) | 1 | 1 | 5 | 7 |
| 14 | Kazakhstan (KAZ) | 0 | 2 | 1 | 3 |
| 15 | Slovenia (SLO) | 0 | 1 | 2 | 3 |
| 16 | Mexico (MEX) | 0 | 1 | 1 | 2 |
| 17 | Hungary (HUN) | 0 | 1 | 0 | 1 |
| 18 | Azerbaijan (AZE) | 0 | 0 | 2 | 2 |
| 19 | Cyprus (CYP) | 0 | 0 | 1 | 1 |
| Totals (19 entries) | | 56 | 56 | 56 | 168 |

== See also ==
- 2024 FIG Artistic Gymnastics World Cup series
