= Eva Brezalieva =

Bulgarian rhythmic gymnast (born 2005)

- Full name: Eva Alyosheva Brezalieva
- Born: January 13, 2005 (age 21) Burgas, Bulgaria

Gymnastics career
- Discipline: Rhythmic gymnastics
- Country represented: Bulgaria; (2018-present)
- Club: Club Iliana
- Head coaches: Valentina Ivanova (2018-2021), Branimira Markova (2023-present)
Medal record
Representing Bulgaria
Rhythmic gymnastics
Event	1st	2nd	3rd
World Championships	1	2	0
European Championships	2	1	0
FIG World Cup	2	6	9
Grand Prix Series	2	4	1
Junior European Championships	0	0	1
Total	7	13	11
World Championships
Gold medal – first place	2023 Valencia	Team
Silver medal – second place	2025 Rio de Janeiro	Team
Silver medal – second place	2026 Frankfurt	Team
European Championships
Gold medal – first place	2023 Baku	Team
Gold medal – first place	2026 Varna	Team
Silver medal – second place	2023 Baku	Ribbon
Junior European Championships
Bronze medal – third place	2020 Kyiv	Rope

Eva Brezalieva (Bulgarian: Ева Брезалиева; born 13 January 2005 in Burgas, Bulgaria) is a Bulgarian individual rhythmic gymnast. She is the 2023 European silver medalist with ribbon and team champion and the 2020 European junior bronze medalist with rope.

On national level, she is a five-time (2021–2025) senior all-around bronze medalist and the 2019 Bulgarian Junior all-around bronze medalist.

== Career ==
She took up rhythmic gymnastics at the age of 6 in Burgas.

=== Junior ===
She competed at the 2019 Bulgarian Junior National Championships, where she won bronze medals in all-around and clubs final and a silver medal in the ball final. Later that year, she competed at the 2019 Junior World Championships in Moscow, Russia, where she placed 8th in the team event and 6th in rope in qualifications.

In 2020, she became the Bulgarian Junior National champion with rope and won the silver medal with ball. She competed at the International Tournament in Moscow, where she and her teammate Stiliana Nikolova took second place in the team competition. She also won silver medals with rope and ball and the bronze medal with ribbon. At the 2020 Junior European Championships in Kyiv, Ukraine, she qualified to two apparatus finals. She won a bronze medal in the rope final.

=== Senior ===
Eva turned senior in 2021. She won bronze medal in all-around, hoop, ball and ribbon at Bulgarian National Championships. In April, she competed at Sofia Cup and won bronze in all-around and hoop. On 17-23 May, she competed at Irina Deleanu Cup in Romania. She took 9th place in all-around and won bronze medal with clubs.

She started the 2022 season by competing at the World Cup in Athens, Greece, where she took the bronze medal in the ribbon final. At Grand Prix in Marbella, Spain, she took a gold medal in the all-around, a gold medal in the ribbon final, and silver medals in the hoop final and clubs finals. At the Portimão World Challenge Cup, she won a bronze medal in the all-around. She represented Bulgaria at the 2022 World Games in Birmingham, United States. She qualified to Clubs final and took 5th place.

In 2023, Brezalieva began her season by competing at the Grand Prix in Marbella, Spain, where she took a bronze medal in the all-around and silver medals in the hoop and ball finals. She next participated (instead of Boryana Kaleyn) in the World Cup in Sofia and qualified for the hoops and clubs finals. She won a silver medal in the clubs final. At the Baku World Cup, she won the all-around bronze medal. She also won silver medals in the hoop and ribbon finals and bronze with ball. She represented Bulgaria together with Stiliana Nikolova and Boryana Kaleyn at the 2023 European Championships in Baku. She competed with ribbon only, and took silver medal in apparatus final.

In 2024, she once again won bronze medal in all-around at Bulgarian National Championships. In June, she competed at Milan World Cup and ended on 14th place in all-around. She qualified to two apparatus finals and finished 6th in hoop and 8th in clubs final.

In 2025, she won bronze medal in Clubs final at Sofia World Cup. On 25-27 April, she competed at World Cup Tashkent where she took 19th place in all-around. She qualified to clubs final and finished on 4th place. On May 9–11, she competed at World Challenge Cup Portimão and won bronze medal in all-around. She was 4th in Hoop, 8th in Ball and 5th in Ribbon final. In the end of May, she won bronze medal in all-around behind Stiliana Nikolova and Dara Stoyanova at Bulgarian National Championships. She also won silver medal in hoop and gold in ribbon final. In June, she represented Bulgaria at the 2025 European Championships in Tallinn, Estonia. She qualified to all-around final, where she finished on 11th place. She was 5th in team competition, 6th in hoop and 7th in ball. In August, she competed at the 2025 World Championships in Rio de Janeiro, Brazil. Together with Stiliana Nikolova and senior group she won silver medal in team competition. She was 8th in all-around final and qualified to ribbon final only, finishing 7th.

In 2026, she started the season competing at World Cup Sofia, taking 6th place in all-around. She won gold medal in clubs final and took 5th place with ribbon. On April 17–19, she competed at World Cup Baku, where she took 21st place in all-around and did not advance into apparatus finals. In June, she represented Bulgaria alongside Stiliana Nikolova at the 2026 European Championships in Varna, Bulgaria. They won gold medal in team competition together with senior group. She took 19th place in all-around final and qualified to three apparatus finals - 7th place with hoop, 8th place with ball and 6th place with ribbon. In August, she competed at the 2026 World Championships in Frankfurt, Germany, and ended on 21st place in all-around qualifications.

== Routine music information ==
Year	Apparatus	Music title
2026	Hoop	Moonlight Sonata
2026	Ball	Black Velvet (song) by Alannah Myles
2026	Clubs	Lolaï by Ishtar Alabina
2026	Ribbon	ТАНГО by Lili Ivanova
2025	Hoop	Hope by NF
2025	Ball	Dune Mosse (feat. Miles Davis) by Zucchero
2025	Clubs	Where Have You Been by Rihanna
2025	Ribbon	Rosa by Fabi Hernandez & Mathieu Ruz
2024	Hoop	Ready or Not by Mischa Book Chillak and Esthero
2024	Ball	Un Amore Grande by Peppino Gagliardi
2024	Clubs	Remix Oriental 2020 Darbuka by Mehdi Ryan
2024	Ribbon	Power (feat. Donna Missal and Travis Poutrelli) by Elliott Wheeler
2023	Hoop	Adiós by Benjamin Clementine
2023	Ball	Flamen'ka y Gitana by Karen Ruimy
2023	Clubs	The Race by Yello
2023	Ribbon	"Rock This Party" (feat. Dollarman, Big Ali, Makedah, Cutee B) (Everybody Dance Now) by Bob Sinclair
2022	Hoop	Butterflies and Hurricanes by Muse
2022	Ball	Isaac (Live) by Madonna
2022	Clubs	The Race by Yello
2022	Ribbon	Born This Way by Lady Gaga
2021	Hoop	The 5th by David Garrett
2021	Ball	Nothing Else Matters by ?
2021	Clubs	Carmen Suite Ballet: II. Dance by Boston Pops Orchestra
2021	Ribbon	El amor brujo: Danza Rituel del Fuego by Manuel de Falla
2020	Rope	I Love Rock 'N Roll by Joan Jett
2020	Ball	Nothing Else Matters by ?
2020	Clubs	Carmen Suite Ballet: II. Dance by Boston Pops Orchestra
2020	Ribbon	Who Wants To Live Forever by Queen / The Tenors feat. Lindsey Stirling
2019	Rope	Samba Do Mundo by Gregor Salto Feat. Saxsymbol & Todorov
2019	Ball	Winter Days December by Vadim Kiselev
2019	Clubs	Shot Me Down by David Guetta ft. Skylar Grey
2019	Ribbon	

== Competitive highlights ==
(Team competitions in seniors are held only at the World Championships, Europeans and other Continental Games.)

International: Senior
Year	Event	AA	Team	Hoop	Ball	Clubs	Ribbon
2026	World Championships	21th (Q)	2nd	22nd (Q)	25th (Q)	19th (Q)	14th (Q)
2026	World Cup Milan	22nd		19th (Q)	24th (Q)	29th (Q)	22nd (Q)
2026	European Championships	19th	1st	7th	8th		6th
2026	World Cup Baku	21st		14th (Q)	27th (Q)	17th (Q)	27th (Q)
2026	World Cup Sofia	6th		18th (Q)	9th (Q)	1st	5th
2025	World Championships	8th	2nd	13th (Q)	11th (Q)		7th
2025	European Championships	11th	5th	6th	7th	10th (Q)	
2025	World Challenge Cup Portimão	3rd		4th	8th	13th (Q)	5th
2025	World Cup Tashkent	19th		21st (Q)	36th (Q)	4th	23rd (Q)
2025	World Cup Sofia	7th		12th (Q)	9th (Q)	3rd	16th (Q)
2025	IT Sofia Cup			1st	7th (Q)	3rd (Q)	1st
2024	World Cup Milan	14th		6th	23rd (Q)	8th	19th (Q)
2023	World Championships Valencia		1st				21st (Q)
2023	European Championships Baku						2nd
2023	World Cup Baku	3rd		3rd	2nd	5th	2nd
2023	World Cup Sofia	6th		7th	24th (Q)	2nd	13th (Q)
2023	Grand Prix Marbella	3rd		2nd	2nd		
2022	World Games Birmingham			14th (Q)	13th (Q)	5th	16th (Q)
2022	World Cup Pesaro	16th		13th (Q)	18th (Q)	2nd	26th (Q)
2022	World Challenge Cup Portimão	3rd		3rd	5th	7th	1st
2022	World Cup Baku	13th		8th	13th (Q)	17th (Q)	15th (Q)
2022	Grand Prix Marbella	1st		2nd		2nd	1st
2022	World Cup Palaio Faliro	10th		15th (Q)	21st (Q)	5th	3rd
International: Junior
Year	Event	AA	Team	Rope	Ball	Clubs	Ribbon
2020	Junior European Championships			3rd		4th	
2019	Junior World Championships		8th	6th (Q)			
National
Year	Event	AA	Team	Hoop	Ball	Clubs	Ribbon
2025	Bulgarian Championships	3rd		2nd			1st
2024	Bulgarian Championships	3rd		2nd			
2023	Bulgarian Championships	3rd					
2022	Bulgarian Championships	3rd					
2021	Bulgarian Championships	3rd		3rd	3rd		3rd
Q = Qualifications (Did not advance to Event Final due to the 2 gymnast per country rule, only Top 8 highest score); WR = World Record; WD = Withdrew; NT = No Team Competition; OC = Out of Competition(competed but scores not counted for qualifications/results), DNS = Did Not Start, DNF = Did Not Finish

== See also ==
- List of medalists at the Rhythmic Gymnastics Junior European Championships
