= 2023 FIG Rhythmic Gymnastics World Cup series =

International gymnastics contest

FIG Rhythmic Gymnastics World Cup series
- Location: various — see locations
- Date: March 17 – July 16, 2023 see schedule

The 2023 FIG World Cup circuit in Rhythmic Gymnastics is a series of competitions officially organized and promoted by the International Gymnastics Federation.

== Formats ==
World Cup
Date	Event	Location	Type
March 17–19	FIG World Cup 2023	(Greece) Athens	Individuals and groups
March 31–April 2	FIG World Cup 2023	(Bulgaria) Sofia	Individuals and groups
April 14–16	FIG World Cup 2023	(Uzbekistan) Tashkent	Individuals and groups
April 21–23	FIG World Cup 2023	(Azerbaijan) Baku	Individuals and groups
July 21–23	FIG World Cup 2023	(Italy) Milan	Individuals and groups

World Challenge Cup
May 5–7	FIG World Challenge Cup 2023	(Portugal) Portimão	Individuals and groups
July 14–16	FIG World Challenge Cup 2023	(Romania) Cluj Napoca	Individuals and groups

== Medal winners ==
=== All-around ===
==== Individual ====
Competitions	Gold	Silver	Bronze
World Cup
Athens	(Italy) Sofia Raffaeli	(Bulgaria) Stiliana Nikolova	(Bulgaria) Boryana Kaleyn
Sofia	(Bulgaria) Stiliana Nikolova	(Italy) Sofia Raffaeli	(Uzbekistan) Takhmina Ikromova
Tashkent	(Italy) Sofia Raffaeli	(Uzbekistan) Takhmina Ikromova	(Germany) Margarita Kolosov
Baku	(Bulgaria) Stiliana Nikolova	(Italy) Sofia Raffaeli	(Bulgaria) Eva Brezalieva
Milan	(Germany) Darja Varfolomeev	(Italy) Sofia Raffaeli	(Bulgaria) Stiliana Nikolova
World Challenge Cup
Portimão	(Germany) Darja Varfolomeev	(United States) Evita Griskenas	(Kazakhstan) Aibota Yertaikyzy
Cluj Napoca	(Italy) Sofia Raffaeli	(Bulgaria) Boryana Kaleyn	(Germany) Darja Varfolomeev

==== Group ====
Competitions	Gold	Silver	Bronze
World Cup
Athens	Israel	Bulgaria	Brazil
Sofia	Bulgaria	Israel	France
Tashkent	China	Germany	Uzbekistan
Baku	China	Israel	Azerbaijan
Milan	Italy	Israel	China
World Challenge Cup
Portimão	Spain	Italy	Azerbaijan
Cluj Napoca	Italy	Bulgaria	Brazil

=== Apparatus ===
==== Hoop ====
Competitions	Gold	Silver	Bronze
World Cup
Athens	(Italy) Sofia Raffaeli	(Hungary) Fanni Pigniczki	(Spain) Polina Berezina
Sofia	(Bulgaria) Stiliana Nikolova	(Israel) Adi Asya Katz	(Italy) Sofia Raffaeli
Tashkent	(Italy) Sofia Raffaeli	(Germany) Margarita Kolosov	(Uzbekistan) Takhmina Ikromova
Baku	(Bulgaria) Stiliana Nikolova	(Italy) Sofia Raffaeli	(Bulgaria) Eva Brezalieva
Milan	(Italy) Sofia Raffaeli	(Ukraine) Viktoriia Onopriienko	(Germany) Darja Varfolomeev
World Challenge Cup
Portimão	(Germany) Darja Varfolomeev	(United States) Evita Griskenas	(Kazakhstan) Aibota Yertaikyzy
Cluj Napoca	(Italy) Sofia Raffaeli	(Bulgaria) Eva Brezalieva	(Germany) Margarita Kolosov

==== Ball ====
Competitions	Gold	Silver	Bronze
World Cup
Athens	(Bulgaria) Stiliana Nikolova	(Italy) Sofia Raffaeli	(United States) Evita Griskenas
Sofia	(Bulgaria) Stiliana Nikolova	(Italy) Sofia Raffaeli	(Uzbekistan) Takhmina Ikromova
Tashkent	(Italy) Sofia Raffaeli	(Germany) Margarita Kolosov	(Slovenia) Ekaterina Vedeneeva
Baku	(Germany) Darja Varfolomeev	(Bulgaria) Eva Brezalieva	(Uzbekistan) Takhmina Ikromova
Milan	(Germany) Darja Varfolomeev	(Bulgaria) Boryana Kaleyn	(Bulgaria) Stiliana Nikolova
World Challenge Cup
Portimão	(Kazakhstan) Elzhana Taniyeva	(Kazakhstan) Aibota Yertaikyzy	(Germany) Darja Varfolomeev
Cluj Napoca	(Bulgaria) Boryana Kaleyn	(Italy) Milena Baldassarri	(Italy) Sofia Raffaeli

==== Clubs ====
Competitions	Gold	Silver	Bronze
World Cup
Athens	(Germany) Margarita Kolosov	(Uzbekistan) Takhmina Ikromova	(Kazakhstan) Elzhana Taniyeva
Sofia	(Bulgaria) Stiliana Nikolova	(Bulgaria) Eva Brezalieva	(Italy) Sofia Raffaeli
Tashkent	(Italy) Sofia Raffaeli	(Germany) Darja Varfolomeev	(Hungary) Fanni Pigniczki
Baku	(Bulgaria) Stiliana Nikolova	(Ukraine) Viktoriia Onopriienko	(Germany) Darja Varfolomeev
Milan	(Germany) Darja Varfolomeev	(Italy) Sofia Raffaeli	(Bulgaria) Stiliana Nikolova
World Challenge Cup
Portimão	(Germany) Darja Varfolomeev	(United States) Evita Griskenas	(China) Zhao Yating
Cluj Napoca	(Bulgaria) Boryana Kaleyn	(Germany) Darja Varfolomeev	(Italy) Sofia Raffaeli

==== Ribbon ====
Competitions	Gold	Silver	Bronze
World Cup
Athens	(Slovenia) Ekaterina Vedeneeva	(Israel) Adi Asya Katz	(Bulgaria) Stiliana Nikolova
Sofia	(Uzbekistan) Takhmina Ikromova	(Kazakhstan) Elzhana Taniyeva	(Brazil) Bárbara Domingos
Tashkent	(Italy) Sofia Raffaeli	(Germany) Darja Varfolomeev	(Germany) Margarita Kolosov
Baku	(Bulgaria) Stiliana Nikolova	(Bulgaria) Eva Brezalieva	(Uzbekistan) Takhmina Ikromova
Milan	(Ukraine) Viktoriia Onopriienko	(Bulgaria) Boryana Kaleyn	(Germany) Darja Varfolomeev
World Challenge Cup
Portimão	(Germany) Darja Varfolomeev	(France) Hélène Karbanov	(Kazakhstan) Elzhana Taniyeva
Cluj Napoca	(Germany) Darja Varfolomeev	(Bulgaria) Eva Brezalieva	(Brazil) Bárbara Domingos

==== 5 Hoops ====
Competitions	Gold	Silver	Bronze
World Cup
Athens	Israel	Italy	Poland
Sofia	Italy	Israel	France
Tashkent	China	Kazakhstan	Uzbekistan
Baku	Israel	China	Ukraine
Milan	Israel	Italy	Bulgaria
World Challenge Cup
Portimão	Brazil	Spain	Italy
Cluj Napoca	Italy	Brazil	Mexico

==== 3 Ribbons and 2 Balls ====
Competitions	Gold	Silver	Bronze
World Cup
Athens	Italy	Israel	Greece
Sofia	Poland	Greece	France
Tashkent	China	Germany	Kazakhstan
Baku	Israel	China	Azerbaijan
Milan	Italy	Israel	China
World Challenge Cup
Portimão	Italy	France	Japan
Cluj Napoca	Brazil	Italy	Bulgaria

== Overall medal table ==
Rank	Nation	Gold	Silver	Bronze	Total
1	Italy (ITA)	17	12	5	34
2	Bulgaria (BUL)	12	11	9	32
3	Germany (GER)	10	7	8	25
4	Israel (ISR)	5	8	0	13
5	China (CHN)	4	2	3	9
6	Brazil (BRA)	2	1	4	7
7	Kazakhstan (KAZ)	1	3	5	9
8	Uzbekistan (UZB)	1	2	7	10
9	Ukraine (UKR)	1	2	1	4
10	Spain (ESP)	1	1	1	3
11	Poland (POL)	1	0	1	2
11	Slovenia (SLO)	1	0	1	2
13	United States (USA)	0	3	1	4
14	France (FRA)	0	2	3	5
15	Greece (GRE)	0	1	1	2
15	Hungary (HUN)	0	1	1	2
17	Azerbaijan (AZE)	0	0	3	3
18	Japan (JPN)	0	0	1	1
18	Mexico (MEX)	0	0	1	1
Totals (19 entries)		56	56	56	168

== See also ==
- 2023 FIG Artistic Gymnastics World Cup series
- 2023 Rhythmic Gymnastics Grand Prix circuit
