= 2022 FIG Rhythmic Gymnastics World Cup series =

International gymnastics contest

FIG Rhythmic Gymnastics World Cup series
- Location: various — see locations
- Date: March 18 – August 28, 2022 see schedule

The 2022 FIG World Cup circuit in Rhythmic Gymnastics is a series of competitions officially organized and promoted by the International Gymnastics Federation.

== Formats ==
World Cup
| Date | Event | Location | Type |
| March 18–20 | FIG World Cup 2022 | (Greece) Athens | Individuals and groups |
| April 8–10 | FIG World Cup 2022 | (Bulgaria) Sofia | Individuals and groups |
| April 15–17 | FIG World Cup 2022 | (Uzbekistan) Tashkent | Individuals and groups |
| April 22–24 | FIG World Cup 2022 | (Azerbaijan) Baku | Individuals and groups |
| June 3–5 | FIG World Cup 2022 | (Italy) Pesaro | Individuals and groups |

World Challenge Cup
| May 20–22 | FIG World Challenge Cup 2022 | (Spain) Pamplona | Individuals and groups |
| May 27–29 | FIG World Challenge Cup 2022 | (Portugal) Portimão | Individuals and groups |
| August 26–28 | FIG World Challenge Cup 2022 | (Romania) Cluj Napoca | Individuals and groups |

On February 26, 2022, the International Gymnastics Federation cancelled all events scheduled to take place in Russia and Belarus due to the 2022 Russian invasion of Ukraine. The Moscow World Challenge Cup, originally planned for 19–21 August and the Minsk World Challenge Cup, originally planned for 2–4 September, were affected by this decision and removed from the FIG calendar.

== Medal winners ==
=== All-around ===
==== Individual ====
| Competitions | Gold | Silver | Bronze |
|---|---|---|---|
World Cup
| Athens | (Italy) Sofia Raffaeli | (Israel) Daria Atamanov | (Israel) Michelle Segal |
| Sofia | (Bulgaria) Boryana Kaleyn | (Italy) Sofia Raffaeli | (Bulgaria) Stiliana Nikolova |
| Tashkent | (Uzbekistan) Takhmina Ikromova | (Slovenia) Ekaterina Vedeneeva | (Germany) Darja Varfolomeev |
| Baku | (Italy) Sofia Raffaeli | (Bulgaria) Boryana Kaleyn | (Italy) Milena Baldassarri |
| Pesaro | (Italy) Sofia Raffaeli | (Italy) Milena Baldassarri | (Bulgaria) Stiliana Nikolova |
World Challenge Cup
| Pamplona | (Bulgaria) Boryana Kaleyn | (Bulgaria) Stiliana Nikolova | (Slovenia) Ekaterina Vedeneeva |
| Portimão | (Israel) Adi Asya Katz | (Germany) Darja Varfolomeev | (Bulgaria) Eva Brezalieva |
| Cluj Napoca | (Italy) Sofia Raffaeli | (Bulgaria) Stiliana Nikolova | (Israel) Daria Atamanov |

==== Group ====
| Competitions | Gold | Silver | Bronze |
|---|---|---|---|
World Cup
| Athens | France | Greece | Poland |
| Sofia | Bulgaria | Greece | France |
| Tashkent | Bulgaria | Uzbekistan | Kazakhstan |
| Baku | Italy | Azerbaijan | Israel |
| Pesaro | Italy | Bulgaria | China |
World Challenge Cup
| Pamplona | Italy | Israel | Spain |
| Portimão | Israel | Spain | Poland |
| Cluj Napoca | Bulgaria | Israel | Spain |

=== Apparatus ===
==== Hoop ====
| Competitions | Gold | Silver | Bronze |
|---|---|---|---|
World Cup
| Athens | (Israel) Daria Atamanov | (Italy) Sofia Raffaeli | (Germany) Melanie Dargel |
| Sofia | (Bulgaria) Boryana Kaleyn | (Italy) Sofia Raffaeli | (France) Maelle Millet |
| Tashkent | (Uzbekistan) Takhmina Ikromova | (Slovenia) Ekaterina Vedeneeva | (Germany) Darja Varfolomeev |
| Baku | (Italy) Sofia Raffaeli | (Bulgaria) Boryana Kaleyn | (Israel) Adi Asya Katz |
| Pesaro | (Italy) Sofia Raffaeli | (Bulgaria) Stiliana Nikolova | (Latvia) Jelizaveta Polstjanaja |
World Challenge Cup
| Pamplona | (Germany) Margarita Kolosov | (Slovenia) Ekaterina Vedeneeva | (Argentina) Sol Martinez Fainberg |
| Portimão | (Israel) Adi Asya Katz | (Germany) Darja Varfolomeev | (Bulgaria) Eva Brezalieva |
| Cluj Napoca | (Italy) Sofia Raffaeli | (Bulgaria) Boryana Kaleyn | (Bulgaria) Stiliana Nikolova |

==== Ball ====
| Competitions | Gold | Silver | Bronze |
|---|---|---|---|
World Cup
| Athens | (Italy) Sofia Raffaeli | (Israel) Daria Atamanov | (Germany) Margarita Kolosov |
| Sofia | (Bulgaria) Boryana Kaleyn | (Italy) Sofia Raffaeli | (Italy) Milena Baldassarri |
| Tashkent | (Germany) Margarita Kolosov | (Germany) Darja Varfolomeev | (Slovenia) Ekaterina Vedeneeva |
| Baku | (Bulgaria) Boryana Kaleyn | (Italy) Milena Baldassarri | (Italy) Sofia Raffaeli |
| Pesaro | (Italy) Sofia Raffaeli | (Slovenia) Ekaterina Vedeneeva | (Bulgaria) Stiliana Nikolova |
World Challenge Cup
| Pamplona | (Germany) Darja Varfolomeev | (Bulgaria) Stiliana Nikolova | (Israel) Noga Block |
| Portimão | (Germany) Darja Varfolomeev | (Israel) Adi Asya Katz | (United States) Lili Mizuno |
| Cluj Napoca | (Israel) Daria Atamanov | (Bulgaria) Boryana Kaleyn | (Italy) Milena Baldassarri |

==== Clubs ====
| Competitions | Gold | Silver | Bronze |
|---|---|---|---|
World Cup
| Athens | (Italy) Sofia Raffaeli | (Israel) Daria Atamanov | (Greece) Panagiota Lytra |
| Sofia | (Bulgaria) Stiliana Nikolova | (Italy) Sofia Raffaeli | (Kazakhstan) Elzhana Taniyeva |
| Tashkent | (Uzbekistan) Takhmina Ikromova | (Slovenia) Ekaterina Vedeneeva | (Germany) Margarita Kolosov |
| Baku | (Israel) Daria Atamanov | (Latvia) Jelizaveta Polstjanaja | (Italy) Sofia Raffaeli |
| Pesaro | (Italy) Sofia Raffaeli | (Bulgaria) Eva Brezalieva | (Bulgaria) Stiliana Nikolova |
World Challenge Cup
| Pamplona | (Bulgaria) Stiliana Nikolova | (Israel) Adi Asya Katz | (Slovenia) Ekaterina Vedeneeva |
| Portimão | (Germany) Darja Varfolomeev | (Israel) Adi Asya Katz | (Bulgaria) Magdalina Minevska |
| Cluj Napoca | (Bulgaria) Stiliana Nikolova | (Israel) Daria Atamanov | (Italy) Sofia Raffaeli |

==== Ribbon ====
| Competitions | Gold | Silver | Bronze |
|---|---|---|---|
World Cup
| Athens | (Israel) Daria Atamanov | (Germany) Margarita Kolosov | (Bulgaria) Eva Brezalieva |
| Sofia | (Bulgaria) Boryana Kaleyn | (Bulgaria) Stiliana Nikolova | (Ukraine) Viktoriia Onopriienko |
| Tashkent | (Slovenia) Ekaterina Vedeneeva | (Germany) Darja Varfolomeev | (Uzbekistan) Takhmina Ikromova |
| Baku | (Bulgaria) Boryana Kaleyn | (Israel) Daria Atamanov | (Slovenia) Ekaterina Vedeneeva |
| Pesaro | (Ukraine) Viktoriia Onopriienko | (Italy) Sofia Raffaeli | (Slovenia) Ekaterina Vedeneeva |
World Challenge Cup
| Pamplona | (Germany) Darja Varfolomeev | (Slovenia) Ekaterina Vedeneeva | (Spain) Teresa Gorospe |
| Portimão | (Bulgaria) Eva Brezalieva | (Israel) Alona Hillel | (United States) Evita Griskenas |
| Cluj Napoca | (Italy) Sofia Raffaeli | (Israel) Daria Atamanov | (Hungary) Fanni Pigniczki |

==== 5 Hoops ====
| Competitions | Gold | Silver | Bronze |
|---|---|---|---|
World Cup
| Athens | Israel | Poland | Kazakhstan |
| Sofia | Bulgaria | Japan | France |
| Tashkent | Bulgaria | Uzbekistan | Kazakhstan |
| Baku | Azerbaijan | Italy | Israel |
| Pesaro | Italy | China | Bulgaria |
World Challenge Cup
| Pamplona | Italy | Spain | Azerbaijan |
| Portimão | Israel | Spain | Mexico |
| Cluj Napoca | Bulgaria | Israel | Spain |

==== 3 Ribbons and 2 Balls ====
| Competitions | Gold | Silver | Bronze |
|---|---|---|---|
World Cup
| Athens | Israel | Greece | Poland |
| Sofia | Greece | Bulgaria | Japan |
| Tashkent | Uzbekistan | Kazakhstan | Bulgaria |
| Baku | Italy | Japan | Kazakhstan |
| Pesaro | Italy | Bulgaria | Brazil |
World Challenge Cup
| Pamplona | Italy | Bulgaria | Azerbaijan |
| Portimão | Mexico | Spain | Poland |
| Cluj Napoca | Bulgaria | Spain | Germany |

== Overall medal table ==
| Rank | Nation | Gold | Silver | Bronze | Total |
|---|---|---|---|---|---|
| 1 | Italy (ITA) | 20 | 9 | 6 | 35 |
| 2 | Bulgaria (BUL) | 18 | 14 | 11 | 43 |
| 3 | Israel (ISR) | 10 | 13 | 6 | 29 |
| 4 | Germany (GER) | 6 | 5 | 6 | 17 |
| 5 | Uzbekistan (UZB) | 4 | 2 | 1 | 7 |
| 6 | Slovenia (SLO) | 1 | 6 | 5 | 12 |
| 7 | Greece (GRE) | 1 | 3 | 1 | 5 |
| 8 | Azerbaijan (AZE) | 1 | 1 | 2 | 4 |
| 9 | France (FRA) | 1 | 0 | 3 | 4 |
| 10 | Mexico (MEX) | 1 | 0 | 1 | 2 |
| 10 | Ukraine (UKR) | 1 | 0 | 1 | 2 |
| 12 | Spain (ESP) | 0 | 5 | 4 | 9 |
| 13 | Japan (JPN) | 0 | 2 | 1 | 3 |
| 14 | Kazakhstan (KAZ) | 0 | 1 | 5 | 6 |
| 15 | Poland (POL) | 0 | 1 | 4 | 5 |
| 16 | China (CHN) | 0 | 1 | 1 | 2 |
| 16 | Latvia (LAT) | 0 | 1 | 1 | 2 |
| 18 | United States (USA) | 0 | 0 | 2 | 2 |
| 19 | Argentina (ARG) | 0 | 0 | 1 | 1 |
| 19 | Brazil (BRA) | 0 | 0 | 1 | 1 |
| 19 | Hungary (HUN) | 0 | 0 | 1 | 1 |
| Totals (21 entries) | | 64 | 64 | 64 | 192 |

== See also ==
- 2022 FIG Artistic Gymnastics World Cup series
- 2022 Rhythmic Gymnastics Grand Prix circuit
