= Boryana Kaleyn =

Bulgarian rhythmic gymnast (born 2000)

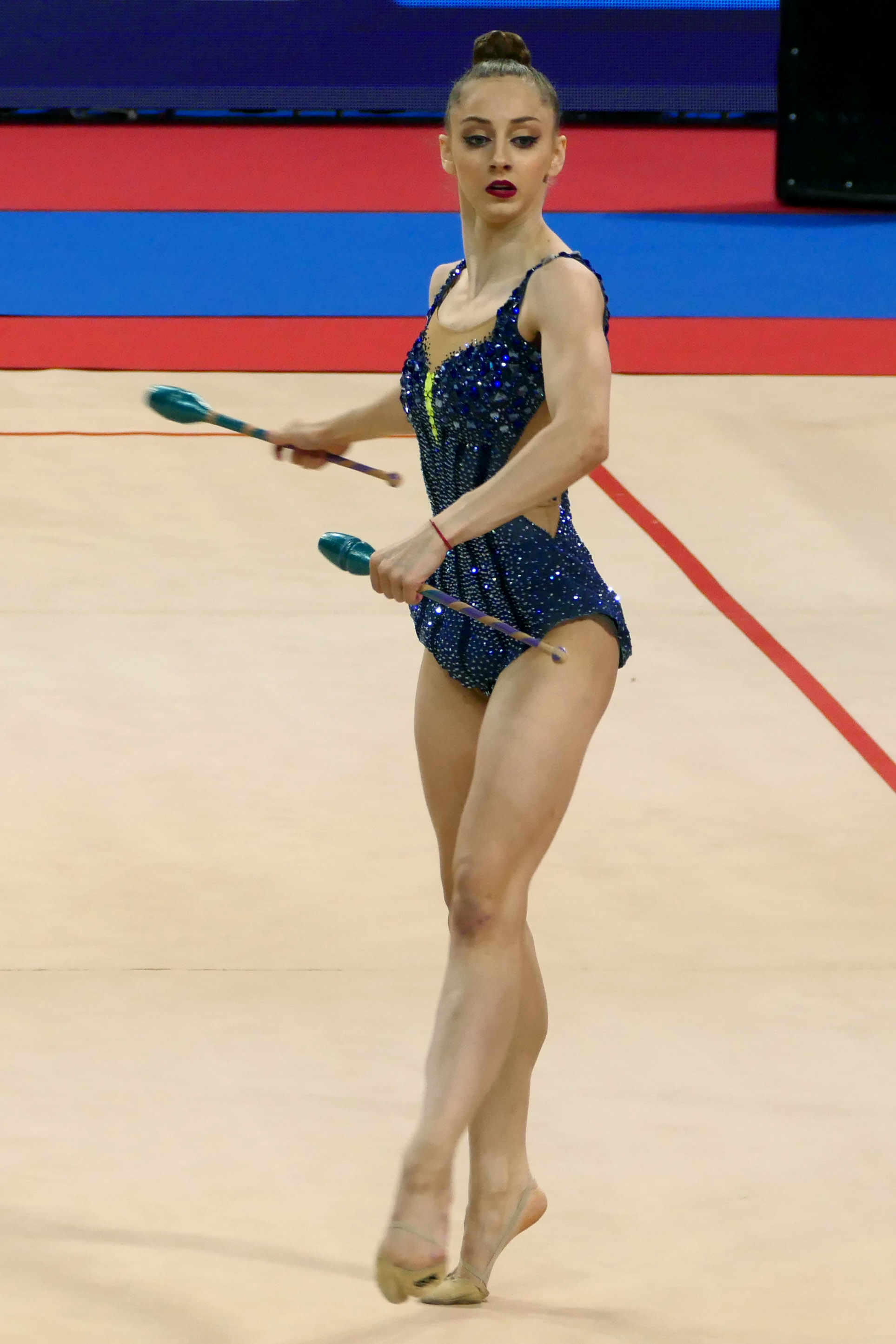
- Kaleyn in 2024

Personal information
- Full name: Boryana Nikolaeva Kaleyn
- Nicknames: Buba, Bubi
- Born: 23 August 2000 (age 26) Sofia, Bulgaria

Gymnastics career
- Discipline: Rhythmic gymnastics
- Country represented: Bulgaria; (2011 – 2024)
- Club: Levski Triaditsa
- Gym: Rakovski
- Head coach: Branimira Markova
- Assistant coach: Mariana Pamukova
- World ranking: 11 WC 19 WCC (2017 Season) 7 WC (2018 Season) 10 WCC (2019 Season) 5 WC 3 WCC (2021 Season) 5 WC 4 WCC (2022 Season) 5 WC (2023 Season)
Medal record
Rhythmic Gymnastics
Representing Bulgaria
Event	1st	2nd	3rd
Olympic Games	0	1	0
World Championships	1	3	0
European Championships	7	3	6
World Games	1	1	0
FIG European Cup	2	1	0
FIG World Cup	19	15	14
Grand Prix Series	4	6	9
Junior European Championships	0	0	1
Total	34	30	30
Olympic Games
Silver medal – second place	2024 Paris	All-Around
World Championships
Gold medal – first place	2023 Valencia	Team
Silver medal – second place	2018 Sofia	Team
Silver medal – second place	2023 Valencia	Clubs
Silver medal – second place	2023 Valencia	Ribbon
European Championships
Gold medal – first place	2022 Tel Aviv	Team
Gold medal – first place	2022 Tel Aviv	Ball
Gold medal – first place	2022 Tel Aviv	Ribbon
Gold medal – first place	2023 Baku	All-Around
Gold medal – first place	2023 Baku	Team
Gold medal – first place	2024 Budapest	Team
Gold medal – first place	2024 Budapest	Hoop
Silver medal – second place	2021 Varna	All-Around
Silver medal – second place	2022 Tel Aviv	All-Around
Silver medal – second place	2023 Baku	Clubs
Bronze medal – third place	2019 Baku	Team
Bronze medal – third place	2019 Baku	Ball
Bronze medal – third place	2019 Baku	Ribbon
Bronze medal – third place	2022 Tel Aviv	Hoop
Bronze medal – third place	2023 Baku	Hoop
Bronze medal – third place	2024 Budapest	Clubs
World Games
Gold medal – first place	2022 Birmingham	Hoop
Silver medal – second place	2022 Birmingham	Ribbon
European Cup
Gold medal – first place	2024 Baku	Ball
Gold medal – first place	2024 Baku	Ribbon
Silver medal – second place	2024 Baku	Hoop
Junior European Championships
Bronze medal – third place	2014 Baku	Ball

Boryana Nikolaeva Kaleyn (Bulgarian: Боряна Николаева Калейн; born 23 August 2000) is a Bulgarian retired individual rhythmic gymnast. She is the 2024 Paris Olympic all-around silver medalist. She is the 2023 European all-around champion, the 2024 European champion with hoop, the 2021 and 2022 European all-around silver medalist, and the 2022 European champion with ball, ribbon, and in the team competition. Kaleyn is also the 2023 World Team all-around champion and the 2022 World Cup Series all-around champion in Sofia and runner-up in Baku. She competed at the 2020 Summer Olympics, finishing fifth in the all-around.

At the national level, she is a four-time Bulgarian National Champion (in 2019, 2020, 2021, and 2022), twice silver medalist (in 2018 and 2023) and once bronze medalist (in 2017).

== Personal life ==
Kaleyn started rhythmic gymnastics at age six. Her favorite gymnast is Maria Petrova. Outside of gymnastics, she enjoys painting and has said she would like to do an exhibition of her work in the future.

== Career ==
=== Junior ===
Kaleyn began appearing in international junior competitions in 2008. She competed in the Junior World Cup and the Junior Grand Prix events. In 2013, she broke her left leg at her first Junior World Cup event. On June 10–16, 2014, Kaleyn competed at the 2014 European Junior Championships. Together with Erika Zafirova and Katerina Marinova, she finished fourth in the team event. She qualified to the ball final and won the bronze medal, which was the only medal won by a Bulgarian at the event. In 2015, Kaleyn won the all-around bronze at the 2015 Sofia Junior World Cup.

=== Senior ===
==== 2016 ====
Kaleyn debuted as a senior in the 2016 season. She finished 10th in the all-around at the Baltic Hoop International tournament. In her next event at the end of March, the Lisbon Senior International Tournament, she finished 4th in the all-around. She qualified for all the apparatus finals and won silver in hoop and ribbon and bronze with clubs and ball. In May, she broke her left ankle and was not able to compete at the European Championships. Later in the season, she finished 10th in the all-around at the Corbeil-Essonnes Cup.

==== 2017 ====
In the 2017 season, Kaleyn competed at the Moscow senior International Tournament, where she won silver in the all-around. She won bronze in the all-around at the 2017 Bulgarian National Championships behind Neviana Vladinova and Katrin Taseva.

She then competed at the 2017 Tashkent World Cup, where she finished 4th in the all-around behind teammate Katrin Taseva and qualified to three event finals. In the finals, she won bronze in clubs and placed 7th in hoop and ball. Her next competition was at the 2017 Baku World Cup, where she finished 9th in the all-around behind Nicol Zelikman.

On May 3–7, Kaleyn won gold in the all-around at the MT Sofia Cup. On May 12–14, Kaleyn competed at the 2017 World Challenge Cup in Portimao, where she finished 4th in the all-around behind Victoria Veinberg Filanovsky. She qualified to three event finals, where she won bronze in clubs and finished 5th in hoop and 6th in ball.

Kaleyn competed at the 2017 World Games in Wrocław, Poland from July 20 to 30. However she did not advance to any of the apparatus finals.

==== 2018 ====
In the 2018 season, Kaleyn participated in the 2018 Grand Prix Moscow, finishing 10th in the all-around. She qualified to three finals and won gold with ball, silver with hoop and bronze with ribbon. On March 30 – April 1, Kaleyn began competing on the World Cup circuit with the 2018 Sofia World Cup. She finished 6th in the all-around; she qualified for two event finals, where she won bronze in hoop and finished 5th in ball. On March 23–25, Kaleyn competed at the 2018 Grand Prix Thiais, where she won the bronze medal in the all-around competition ahead of teammate Katrin Taseva. In the apparatus finals she won bronze with ball and clubs and finished 5th in hoop and 9th in ribbon.

On April 20–22, at the 2018 Tashkent World Cup, Kaleyn finished 9th in the all-around and qualified to two apparatus finals. She won bronze in hoop and finished 8th in ribbon. On April 27–29, Kaleyn competed at the next World Cup event, the 2018 Baku World Cup, where she finished 9th in the all-around. She qualified for two apparatus finals and took silver in clubs and finished 4th in hoop.

At her first World Championships, held in her hometown of Sofia, Kaleyn won a silver medal with the Bulgarian team. In the qualifications, she received the highest score on hoop of the Bulgarian gymnasts, but she received the lowest with ball after missing a difficulty, which she expressed disappointment about. She won silver in teams with the other Bulgarian gymnasts and qualified to two apparatus finals.

==== 2019 ====
Kaleyn started her 2019 season competing at the GCP Lisbon senior International Tournament, where she ranked 5th in the all-around. She qualified to two finals, winning gold with hoop and bronze with ball. On March 28 – April 1, she competed at the 2019 Grand Prix Thiais, where she placed 4th in the all-around behind Arina Averina, Linoy Ashram, and Dina Averina. She qualified for three apparatus finals, winning silver with ribbon and placing 5th with ball and 8th with hoop.

Kaleyn then competed at the 2019 Pesaro World Cup, where she won her first World Cup all-around medal by finishing in third place behind Dina and Arina Averina. She qualified for three apparatus finals, winning silver in ball, and placing 4th in hoop and 5th in clubs. At her next event, the 2019 Tashkent World Cup, Kaleyn won silver in the all-around and qualified to all four apparatus finals; she won silver with ball and ribbon and finished 7th with clubs and 8th with hoop.

On April 16–19, she competed in the 2019 European Championships with her teammates Katrin Taseva and Neviana Vladinova, with whom she won the bronze medal in the team event. She qualified for three apparatus finals, winning bronze in ball and ribbon and placing 7th with hoop.

==== 2021 ====
Kaleyn represented Bulgaria at the 2020 Summer Olympics and finished 5th in the individual all-around final. She said that she was glad that she had qualified for the Olympics, but expressed disappointment and frustration with the mistakes she made.

==== 2022 ====
At the European Championships in Tel Aviv, Kaleyn won the all-around silver and also won the team gold along with the other Bulgarian gymnasts. In the event finals, she won gold with ball and ribbon and bronze with hoop. At the World Games in Birmingham, she won hoop gold and silver for ribbon. She was selected to compete in the 2022 World Championships; however, she missed competing there as she was hospitalized with a high fever due to a virus.

==== 2023: European title ====
At the European Championships in Baku, Kaleyn won her first European title after competing the last routine in the all-around final. She also won gold in the team competition, silver with clubs, and bronze with hoop. At the World Championships in Valencia, she came in sixth in the all-around final after dropping her apparatus in two routines. However, she won team gold with the rest of the Bulgarian team, along with silver medals in clubs and ribbon.

==== 2024: Olympic silver medalist ====
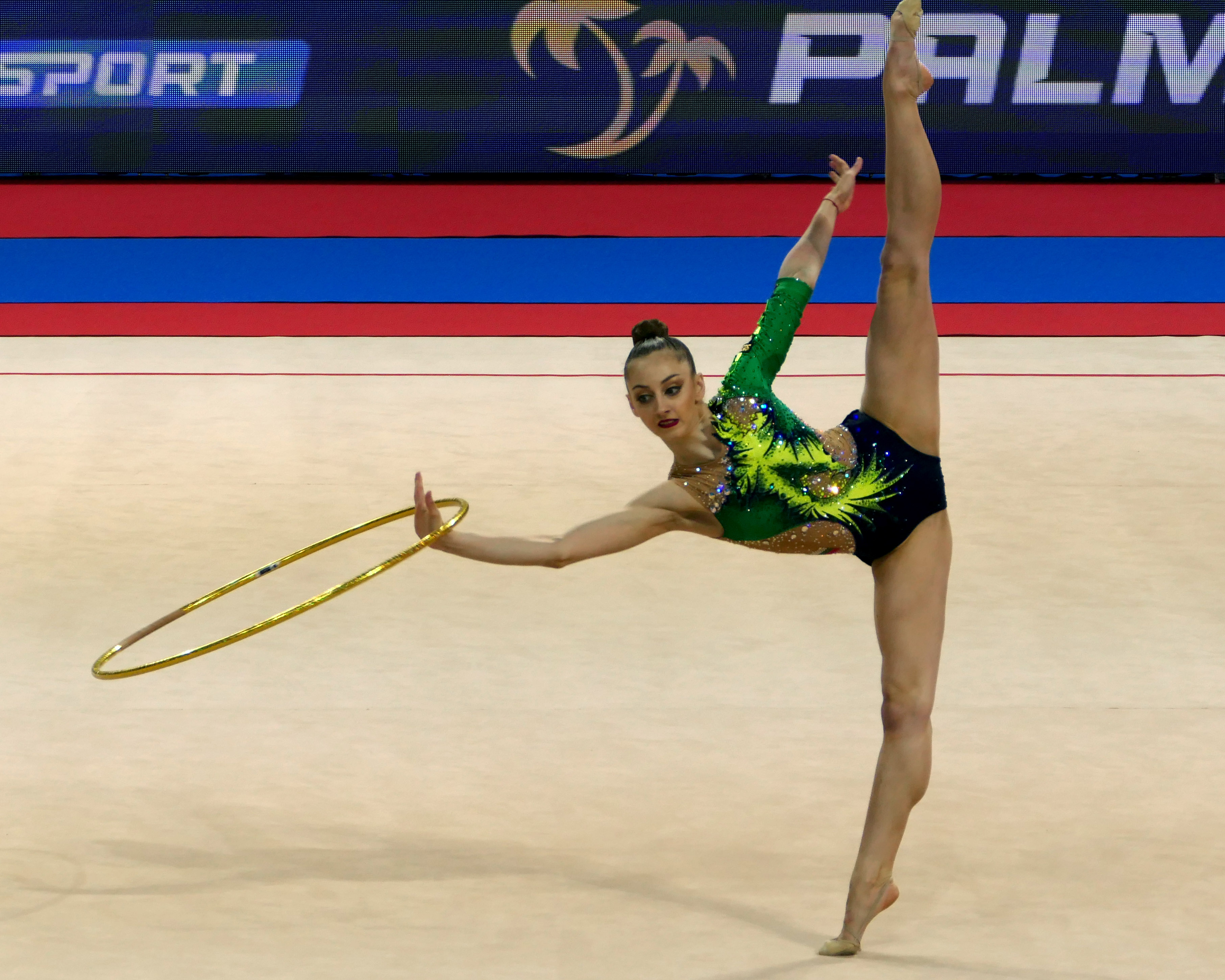
Kaleyn performing a side split pivot at the 2024 Sofia World Cup

Kaleyn's routines for the 2024 season were unusual in that they were connected rather than separate and intended to portray the personal story of her career. Her ribbon music was composed especially for her.

In April, Kaelyn competed at the World Cup held in Sofia, Bulgaria. There she won the all-around ahead of fellow Bulgarian Stiliana Nikolova and Daria Atamanov. She qualified to every apparatus final and won silver with clubs. Both Kaleyn and Nikolova expressed gratitude for the supportive home crowd and stated that they were aiming to win gold at the upcoming 2024 Summer Olympics. At the end of April, she competed at the next World Cup in Tashkent, Uzbekistan, where she came in bronze in the all-around; she again qualified to every apparatus final and won a second bronze with hoop.

Ahead of the European Championships, Kaleyn participated in the inaugural Rhythmic Gymnastics European Cup, which had an unusual knock-out round format for the all-around final. In the apparatus finals, she won gold in ball and ribbon and silver with hoop behind Sofia Raffaeli. She said that she was happy to be competing in the same arena where had won the European Championship the previous year. At the European Championships, she ended in fourth place in the all-around after mistakes in her hoop and ball routines. However, she went on to win bronze in the clubs final and gold in the hoop final, the first European hoop title for Bulgaria since 1988, and she won gold in the team competition with the other Bulgarian competitors.

Kaleyn was chosen to represent Bulgaria at the 2024 Olympics. After the European Championships, she revised her routines. At the last competition before the Olympics, the World Challenge Cup in Cluj-Napoca in July, she finished fourth in the all-around and qualified for three apparatus finals. She won a bronze with ball.

In August, she competed at the 2024 Summer Olympics. She qualified for the all-around final in third place. In the final, she won the silver medal, which was the first for Bulgaria in individual rhythmic gymnastics since Adriana Dunavska won silver at the 1988 Summer Olympics. She said afterward, "When I was six years old I started to train gymnastics with this dream to win an Olympic medal. That finally came true."

After the award ceremony, Iliana Raeva, the president of the Bulgarian Rhythmic Gymnastics Federation, called Kaleyn ‘The Queen’ and said she had never had such a successful competition, with eight out of eight routines performed with a high level of difficulty and without mistakes.

Kaleyn announced her retirement from the sport on December 9. At the same time, the Bulgarian Rhythmic Gymnastics Federation announced the final selection for the new individual national team. Kaleyn was replaced by Eva Brezalieva. She said that she planned to become a coach.

== Style ==
Kaleyn performing fouette turns at the 2024 Sofia World Cup

Kaleyn is distinctive in her approach to rhythmic gymnastics for her routine music choices, which use a diverse array of styles from folk music to heavy metal and alternative rock. She has said that "If I listen to the music for the first time and I cannot imagine how I would perform to that music or what movements I would do and where, I know this is not my music." Her choreography has been described as creative. She is also known for her strong work with fouetté turns and her ability to perform a number of revolutions.

Kaleyn's routines for the Paris Olympics are considered innovative, as the four routines were connected to tell her story about her path in rhythmic gymnastics. The storyline begins with the hoop routine, which focuses on her childhood years in the gym when everything was easy. The ball routine is about the time when Kaleyn began winning medals at major competitions, while the clubs routine is about the difficulties she experienced. The story ends with the ribbon routine and is about the last part of her career, in which she found faith in herself. The music and the final poses of the four compositions serve as a link between them. Each routine begins with the final music and the final pose of the previous one in the sequence.

== Detailed Olympic results ==
Year	Competition Description	Location	Music	Apparatus	Rank-Final	Score-Final	Rank-Qualifying	Score-Qualifying
2020	Olympics	Tokyo		All-around	5th	100.625	8th	95.650
2020	Olympics	Tokyo	"Kakamora" from Moana by Mark Mancina	Hoop	5th	25.900	9th	24.100
2020	Olympics	Tokyo	"Vecheray, Rado" by Slavi Trifonov	Ball	6th	25.625	6th	25.800
2020	Olympics	Tokyo	"3 to Tango" by Pitbull	Clubs	5th	26.650	4th	26.600
2020	Olympics	Tokyo	"Enter Sandman" by New Orleans Band (the first part is from Mozart's Symphony No. 40)	Ribbon	3rd	22.450	18th	19.150
2024	Olympics	Paris		All-around	2nd	140.600	3rd	136.450
2024	Olympics	Paris	"특(S-Class)" by Stray Kids	Hoop	2nd	35.850	2nd	35.350
2024	Olympics	Paris	"Never Enough" (from The Greatest Showman) by Loren Allred	Ball	2nd	36.450	4th	34.600
2024	Olympics	Paris	"SOS d'un terrien en détresse" by Dimash Qudaibergen	Clubs	3rd	34.550	5th	33.600
2024	Olympics	Paris	"The Power in Me" by Emelina Gorcheva	Ribbon	1st	33.750	2nd	32.900

== Competitive highlights ==
(Team competitions in seniors are held only at the World Championships, Europeans and other Continental Games.)

International: Senior
Year	Event	AA	Team	Hoop	Ball	Clubs	Ribbon
2024	2024 Olympic Games	2nd					
2024	World Challenge Cup Cluj-Napoca	4th		7th	3rd	6th	10th (Q)
2024	European Championships	4th	1st	1st		3rd	
2024	European Cup	4th		2nd	1st	4th (Q)	1st
2024	World Cup Tashkent	3rd		3rd	5th	4th	8th
2024	World Cup Sofia	1st		8th	8th	2nd	6th
2024	IT Sofia Cup	1st			2nd	2nd	2nd
2023	World Championships	6th	1st	4th	4th	2nd	2nd
2023	World Cup Milan	4th		7th	2nd		2nd
2023	World Challenge Cup Cluj-Napoca	2nd			1st	1st	4th
2023	European Championships	1st	1st	3rd	6th	2nd	
2023	World Cup Athens	3rd					
2023	Grand Prix Tartu	4th		7th(Q)	9th(Q)	3rd	1st
2022	World Championships	DNS	DNS	DNS	DNS	DNS	DNS
2022	World Challenge Cup Cluj-Napoca	4th		2nd	2nd	12th (Q)	5th
2022	World Games			1st	5th	4th	2nd
2022	European Championships	2nd	1st	3rd	1st	8th	1st
2022	World Challenge Cup Pamplona	1st		WD	WD	WD	WD
2022	World Cup Baku	2nd		2nd	1st	10th (Q)	1st
2022	World Cup Sofia	1st		1st	1st	6th	1st
2022	Grand Prix Marbella	2nd					2nd
2021	World Championships	4th		4th	4th	4th	8th
2021	World Challenge Cup Cluj-Napoca	1st		1st	1st	1st	1st
2021	Olympic Games	5th					
2021	European Championships	2nd	4th	7th	6th	4th	9th (Q)
2021	World Cup Baku	2nd		9th (Q)	3rd	2nd	1st
2021	World Cup Sofia	2nd		1st	3rd	1st	1st
2021	Grand Prix Moscow	4th		3rd	3rd	1st	2nd
2020	European Championships	4th					
2020	Grand Prix Brno	3rd		4th		1st	2nd
2019	World Championships	4th	6th	5th	5th	10th (Q)	12th (Q)
2019	World Challenge Cup Kazan	4th		4th	3rd	5th	11th (Q)
2019	World Challenge Cup Minsk	6th		24th (Q)	4th	6th	7th
2019	Grand Prix final: Brno	5th		2nd	3rd		
2019	European Championships		3rd	7th	3rd		3rd
2019	World Cup Tashkent	2nd		8th	2nd	7th	2nd
2019	World Cup Pesaro	3rd		4th	2nd	5th	
2018
2018	World Championships		2nd	4th			6th
2018	Kazan World Cup	4th		3rd	6th	4th	7th
2018	Baku World Cup	9th		4th		2nd	
2018	Tashkent World Cup	9th		3rd			8th
2018	Grand Prix Thiais	3rd		5th	3rd	3rd	9th
2018	Sofia World Cup	6th		3rd	5th		
2018	Grand Prix Moscow	10th		2nd	1st		3rd
2017	World Games			9th (Q)	9th (Q)	10th (Q)	9th (Q)
2017	World Challenge Cup in Portimao	4th		5th	6th	3rd	
2017	MT Sofia Cup	1st		2nd	1st	1st	1st
2017	World Cup Baku	9th		20th (Q)	10th (Q)	15th (Q)	7th
2017	World Cup Tashkent	4th		7th	7th	3rd	
2017	Alina International Tournament	2nd					
2016	Corbeil-Essonnes Cup	10th					
2016	International Tournament of Lisbon	4th		2nd	2nd	2nd	2nd
2016	Baltic Hoop	10th					
International: Junior
Year	Event	AA	Team	Hoop	Ball	Clubs	Ribbon
2014	European Junior Championships		4th		3rd		
National
Year	Event	AA	Team	Hoop	Ball	Clubs	Ribbon
2023	Bulgarian Championships	2nd		1st	2nd	3rd	4th
2022	Bulgarian Championships	1st		2nd	1st	5th	1st
2021	Bulgarian Championships	1st		1st	1st	1st	1st
2020	Bulgarian Championships	1st		1st	1st	2nd	1st
2019	Bulgarian Championships	1st		1st	2nd	1st	3rd
2018	Bulgarian Championships	2nd		6th	1st	3rd	2nd
2017	Bulgarian Championships	3rd		2nd	3rd		1st
Q = Qualifications (Did not advance to Event Final due to the 2 gymnast per country rule, only Top 8 highest score); WR = World Record; WD = Withdrew; NT = No Team Competition; OC = Out of Competition(competed but scores not counted for qualifications/results), DNS = Did Not Start, DNF = Did Not Finish

== Routine music information ==
Year	Apparatus	Music title
2024
2024	Hoop	"특(S-Class)" by Stray Kids
2024	Ball	"Never Enough" (from The Greatest Showman) by Loren Allred
2024	Clubs	"SOS d'un terrien en détresse" by Dimash Qudaibergen
2024	Ribbon	"The Power in Me" by Emelina Gorcheva
2023	Hoop	"Boryano, Balgarko" by Emelina Gorcheva
2023	Ball	"Storm" by Otyken
2023	Clubs	"L'ambôccá (Steven Richard Davis Remix)" by Califato ¾
2023	Ribbon	"Total Eclipse of the Heart" by Bonnie Tyler
2022	Hoop	"When You're Good To Mama" (from Chicago) by Queen Latifah and Taye Diggs
2022	Ball	"Creep" by Postmodern Jukebox
2022	Clubs	"Mutant Brain (feat. Agent Sasco (Assassin))" by Sam i & Ape Drums
2022	Ribbon	"Izlel ye Delyo Haydutin"
2021	Hoop	"Kakamora" (from Moana) by Mark Mancina
2021	Ball	"Vecheray, Rado" by Slavi Trifonov
2021	Clubs	"3 to Tango" by Pitbull
2021	Ribbon	"Enter Sandman" by New Orleans Band (the first part is from Mozart's Symphony No. 40)
2020	Hoop	"Kakamora" (from Moana) by Mark Mancina
2020	Ball	"Vecheray, Rado" by Slavi Trifonov
2020	Clubs	"3 to Tango" by Pitbull
2020	Ribbon	"Enter Sandman" by New Orleans Band
2019	Hoop	"The Phantom of the Opera" by Prague Cello Quartet
2019	Ball	"I'm Trouble" by Linda Roan
2019	Clubs (first)	"The Road" by Balázs Havasi
2019	Clubs (Second)	"I'm So Excited (Instrumental)" by Retro Spectres
2019	Ribbon	"Dance of Curse" by Yoko Kanno
2018	Hoop	"You Don't Own Me" by Saygrace and G-Eazy
2018	Ball	"Can You Hear Me" by Mariana Popova and Orlin Goranov
2018	Clubs	"Fireplaces Escape" (from Harry Potter and the Deathly Hallows – Part 1) by Alexandre Desplat
2018	Ribbon	"Kairos" by Derek Hough
2017	Hoop	"You Don't Own Me" by Saygrace and G-Eazy
2017	Ball	"Complici" by Musica Nuda
2017	Clubs	"Into the Void" by Nine Inch Nails
2017	Ribbon	"Gitanos" by Csilla Szentpéteri
