= Stiliana Nikolova =

Bulgarian rhythmic gymnast (born 2005)

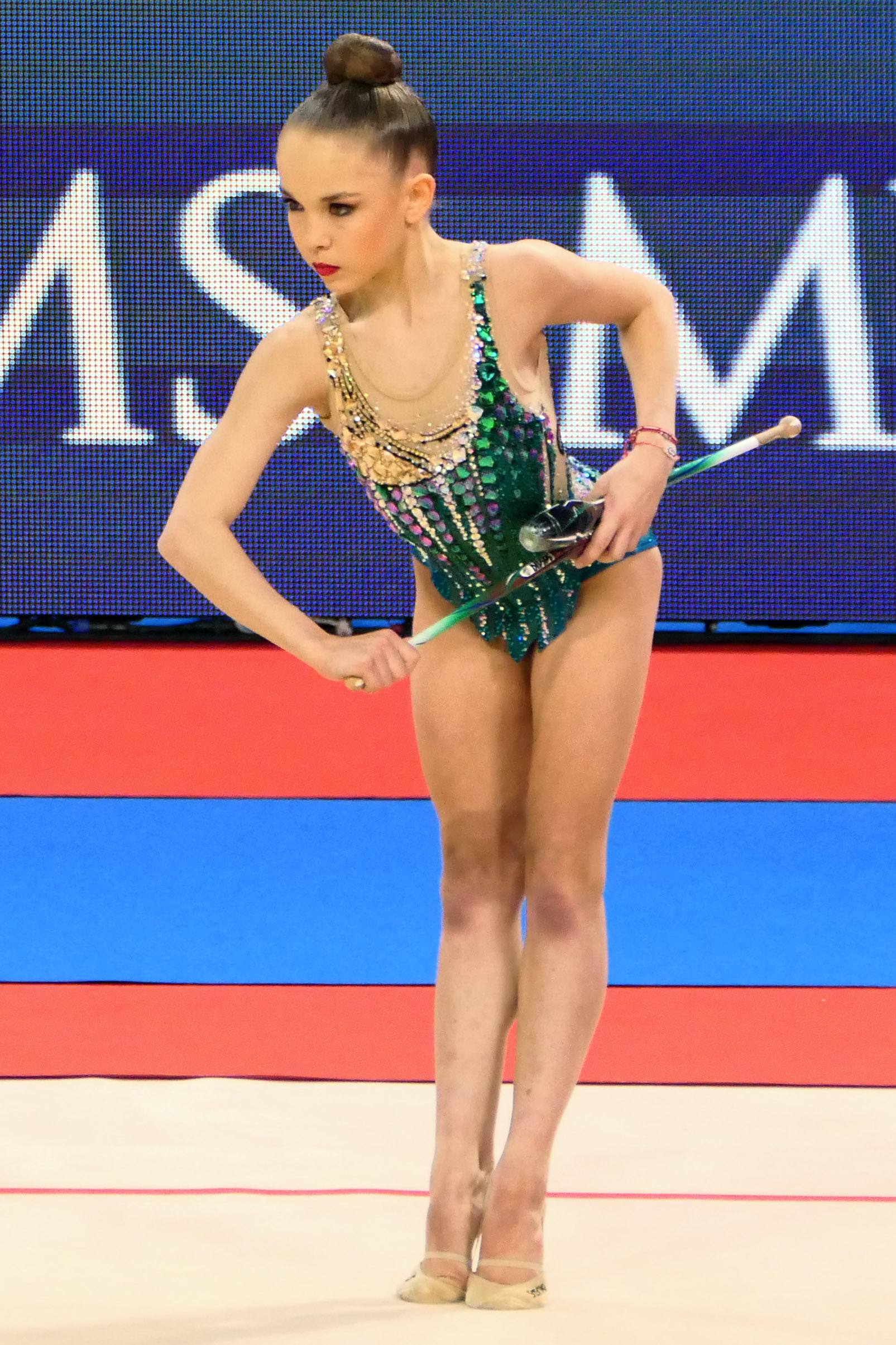
- Nikolova at the 2024 FIG Rhythmic Gymnastics World Cup series in Sofia, Bulgaria

Personal information
- Full name: Stiliana Nikolova
- Nicknames: Stili, Stilito
- Born: August 22, 2005 (age 21) Cairo, Egypt
- Height: 141 cm (4 ft 8 in)
- Relatives: Paulina Nikolova (mother); Iliya Dyakov (father)

Gymnastics career
- Discipline: Rhythmic gymnastics
- Country represented: Bulgaria; (2019–present)
- Club: SC’Iliana’
- Head coach: Valentina Ivanova
- World ranking: 4 (2026 Season ) 3 (2025 Season ) 17 (2024 Season ) 2 (2023 Season); 7 (2022 Season)
Medal record
Rhythmic Gymnastics
Representing Bulgaria
Event	1st	2nd	3rd
World Championships	2	10	3
European Championships	9	6	3
FIG World Cup	16	11	12
FIG World Challenge Cup	3	6	1
FIG European Cup	5	1	0
Grand Prix Series	9	3	4
Junior European Championships	1	1	0
Total	45	38	23
Representing Bulgaria
World Championships
Gold medal – first place	2023 Valencia	Team
Gold medal – first place	2026 Frankfurt	Clubs
Silver medal – second place	2022 Sofia	Hoop
Silver medal – second place	2022 Sofia	Clubs
Silver medal – second place	2022 Sofia	Ribbon
Silver medal – second place	2025 Rio de Janeiro	All-Around
Silver medal – second place	2025 Rio de Janeiro	Team
Silver medal – second place	2025 Rio de Janeiro	Hoop
Silver medal – second place	2025 Rio de Janeiro	Ribbon
Silver medal – second place	2026 Frankfurt	All-Around
Silver medal – second place	2026 Frankfurt	Team
Silver medal – second place	2026 Frankfurt	Ribbon
Bronze medal – third place	2022 Sofia	All-Around
Bronze medal – third place	2023 Valencia	Ball
Bronze medal – third place	2025 Rio de Janeiro	Clubs
European Championships
Gold medal – first place	2022 Tel Aviv	Team
Gold medal – first place	2023 Baku	Team
Gold medal – first place	2024 Budapest	All-Around
Gold medal – first place	2024 Budapest	Team
Gold medal – first place	2025 Tallinn	Hoop
Gold medal – first place	2025 Tallinn	Ball
Gold medal – first place	2025 Tallinn	Clubs
Gold medal – first place	2026 Varna	Team
Gold medal – first place	2026 Varna	Clubs
Silver medal – second place	2023 Baku	Ball
Silver medal – second place	2024 Budapest	Hoop
Silver medal – second place	2025 Tallinn	All-Around
Silver medal – second place	2026 Varna	All-Around
Silver medal – second place	2026 Varna	Ball
Silver medal – second place	2026 Varna	Ribbon
Bronze medal – third place	2022 Tel Aviv	All-Around
Bronze medal – third place	2023 Baku	All-Around
Bronze medal – third place	2023 Baku	Ribbon
European Cup
Gold medal – first place	2024 Baku	Cross Battle
Gold medal – first place	2024 Baku	Clubs
Gold medal – first place	2025 Burgas	Ball
Gold medal – first place	2025 Burgas	Clubs
Gold medal – first place	2025 Burgas	Ribbon
Silver medal – second place	2025 Burgas	Cross Battle
Junior European Championships
Gold medal – first place	2020 Kyiv	Ribbon
Silver medal – second place	2020 Kyiv	Ball
- Last updated on: 14 August 2026.

Stiliana Nikolova (Bulgarian: Стилияна Николова; born 22 August 2005) is a Bulgarian individual rhythmic gymnast. She is the 2024 European all-around champion, the 2025 and 2026 World all-around silver medalist, 2022 World all-around bronze medalist and hoop, clubs, and ribbon silver medalist, the 2023 World ball bronze medalist and team competition champion, and a two-time (2022, 2023) European all-around bronze medalist and champion in the team competition. She competed at the 2024 Summer Olympics, where she came in 11th place in all-around qualifications. At the junior level, she is the 2020 European Junior ribbon champion and ball silver medalist.

At the national level, she is a three-time (2023-2025) national champion and the 2022 national all-around silver medalist. She is also a two-time (2019, 2020) Bulgarian Junior all-around champion.

== Personal life ==
Nikolova was born 22 August 2005 in Cairo, Egypt. Her father, Iliya Dyakov, was a football player who represented Bulgaria at the 1986 Football World Cup in Mexico. Her mother, Paulina Nikolova, was a group rhythmic gymnast who competed for Bulgaria and is the 1983 and 1985 World group all-around champion. Nikolova has one sister, Paola, and a brother, Denis, both of whom are more than fifteen years older than her.

Since a very young age, Nikolova spent all her time at the training all together with her mother and older sister, who both work as rhythmic gymnastic coaches in Egypt. She moved alone to Bulgaria in 2018 at age of 13 to join the Bulgarian national team.

She speaks four languages - Arabic, Bulgarian, English and Russian. In August 2024, she enrolled in the National Sports Academy "Vasil Levski".

== Career ==
=== Junior ===
==== 2019 ====
She competed at the 2019 Bulgarian Junior National Championships, where she won the gold medal in the all-around in addition to the ball and ribbon finals, and the silver medal in the rope and clubs finals. She competed at the 2019 Junior World Championships in Moscow, Russia, where she placed 8th in the team competition and 16th in clubs qualifications.

==== 2020 ====
In 2020, she became the Bulgarian junior national all-around champion once again. She also won gold with ball, clubs and ribbon and a bronze medal with rope. Next, Nikolova competed at the International Tournament in Moscow, where she and her teammate Eva Brezalieva took second place in the team competition and Nikolov won the silver medal in clubs. She also won the gold medal in the all-around at the International Tournament Corbeil-Essonnes in France. In the finals, she placed first with rope and ball and third with ribbon. In November, she competed at the 2020 Junior European Championships in Kyiv, Ukraine and qualified for two apparatus finals. She won the gold medal with ribbon and the silver medal with ball.

=== Senior ===
==== 2021 ====
She made her debut in the senior category in 2021. Since it was an Olympic year, the two Bulgarian gymnasts selected to compete at the Olympics, Boryana Kaleyn and Katrin Taseva, were given priority for competing. Nevertheless, Nikolova represented Bulgaria at the Pesaro World Cup in April, where she took 9th place in the all-around. The next day, she qualified for the clubs final and finished in 8th place. She also competed at the Minsk World Challenge Cup and was 10th in the all-around, but she did not advance into apparatus finals.

==== 2022 ====
In the 2022 season, she participated at the 2022 Grand Prix Marbella, where she won the all-around bronze. She qualified for three apparatus finals, winning gold in hoop and clubs and taking the silver in the ball final. On April 8–10, she competed at Sofia World Cup, where she placed third in the all-around. She also won gold in clubs and silver in the ribbon final. In May, Nikolova participated at the 2022 World Challenge Cup in Pamplona, where she won silver in the all-around behind teammate Boryana Kaleyn. She also won the gold in the clubs final and silver in ball. On June 3–5, she competed at the Pesaro World Cup, where she finished 3rd in the all-around and qualified for three apparatus finals, winning bronze medals with clubs and ball and silver in hoop.

From June 15–19, Nikolova competed at the 2022 European Championships in Tel Aviv, Israel, where she won gold as part of the Bulgarian team and bronze in the all-around. On August 26–28, she competed at the 2022 World Challenge Cup Cluj-Napoca and won the silver in all-around. She also won two medals in the apparatus finals - gold in clubs and bronze in the hoop final.

She was then selected to compete at the 2022 Rhythmic Gymnastics World Championships, in Sofia, Bulgaria, along with teammate Boryana Kaleyn. She qualified to the individual all-around final and three apparatus finals. In the all-around final, she won bronze, and she also won three silver medals in the hoop, clubs and ribbon finals. She also won an Olympic quota for Bulgaria.

==== 2023 ====
Her first competition in the 2023 season was Grand Prix Miss Valentine in Tartu, Estonia, where she finished second in the all-around behind in Viktoriia Onopriienko and qualified to the ball, clubs and ribbon finals. She won both the ball and clubs finals.

Afterward, she competed at the 2023 Grand Prix Marbella, where she won silver in the all-around. She qualified for all four apparatus finals, winning gold in ball and clubs and bronze in hoop and ribbon.

She also took part in the Athens World Cup, where she won silver in all-around, gold in ball and bronze in the ribbon final. At the next World Cup in Sofia, she won the all-around. She qualified for all four finals, winning three more gold medals with hoop, ball and clubs. Two weeks later at the Baku World Cup, she again won gold in all-around as well as gold in the hoop, clubs and ribbon finals.

Nikolova was then selected to compete at the 2023 Rhythmic Gymnastics European Championships, in Baku, Azerbaijan. She qualified in first place for the all-around final and also for three apparatus finals. In the all-around final, she won bronze, repeating her achievement from the previous year. In the event finals the next day, she also won silver with ball and bronze with ribbon.

At the 2023 World Championships, Nikolova came in fourth in the all-around final after several mistakes. She had a drop in her ball routine, and she did not hear the signal to start her ribbon routine on time; on restarting, she had a knot in her ribbon. However, she and the rest of the Bulgarian gymnasts won first place in the team competition. She also qualified to the hoop and ball finals. Although she ended in eighth place in the hoop final, she won bronze with the ball behind Darja Varfolomeev and Sofia Raffaeli.

==== 2024: First European title ====
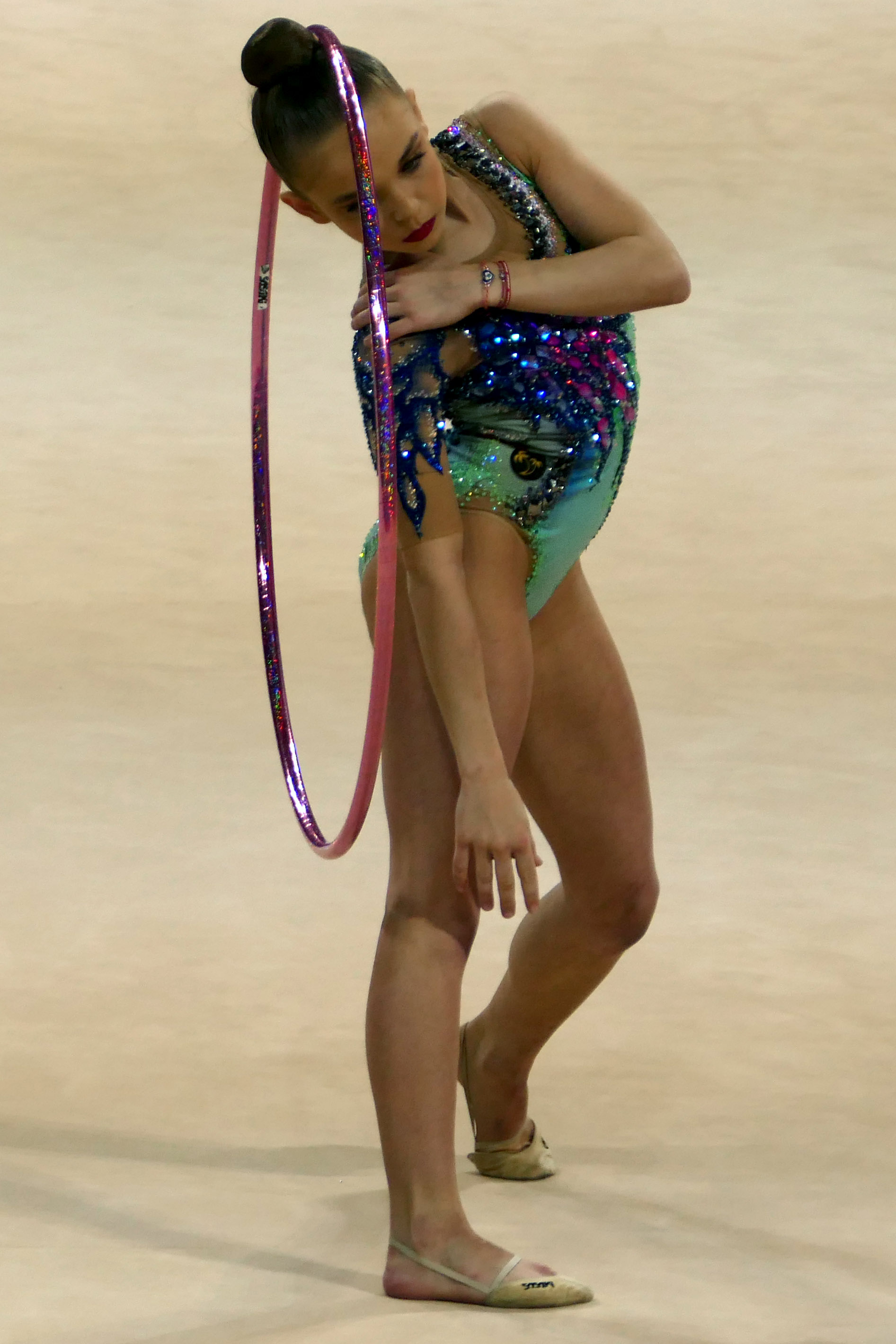
Nikolova's starting pose for her hoop routine at the 2024 Sofia World Cup

In March, Nikolova participated in the Grand Prix stage in Marbella, Spain. She was first place in the all-around ahead of Takhmina Ikromova and the previous season's World champion, Varfolomeev. She also won the clubs and ribbon finals. Her next competition was the World Cup held in Sofia, Bulgaria. There she won the all-around silver behind fellow Bulgarian Boryana Kaleyn and ahead of Daria Atamanov. She also qualified to three of the apparatus finals: hoop, ball, and ribbon. Nikolova won the ball final with the highest score that had been awarded thus far under the 2022-2024 Code of Points, and she also won the ribbon final and took silver with hoop. Both Nikolova and Kaleyn expressed gratitude for the supportive home crowd and stated that they were aiming to win gold at the upcoming 2024 Summer Olympics.

In May, Nikolova participated in the inaugural Rhythmic Gymnastics European Cup, which had an unusual knock-out round format for the all-around final. She was the event's first winner, and she expressed interest in the new competition format. She won another Bulgarian national all-around title.

At the 2024 European Championships, Nikolova won her first European all-around title ahead of Raffaeli and Varfolomeev. She also won a silver medal in the hoop final, and she placed fourth in the ribbon final and fifth in the ball final.

In August, Nikolova competed at the 2024 Summer Olympics. In the qualifying round, she made multiple mistakes in her routines, especially in her club routines, where she dropped her apparatus twice. She finished in 11th place, meaning that she did not advance to the final, though she was the first reserve. In an interview afterward, Nikolova said that she had felt nervous before the beginning of the qualifying round. She added that while she found watching the final difficult after failing to qualify, she was very happy for her friend Kaleyn, who won the silver medal.

==== 2025 ====
Nikolova won the first internal control competition of the year in February. She said that she was happy with the new code of points, which had just entered into effect, and that she aimed to show a different character in her new routines than she had previously. Her first international competition of the year was the International Tournament Sofia Cup, held 28-30 March, where she won the all-around and the ball and clubs finals. The following week, she competed at the Sofia World Cup, where she won the all-around silver medal behind Taisiia Onofriichuk. She qualified for three apparatus finals, winning gold in the hoop and ball.

On April 18-20, she competed at the Baku World Cup and won the bronze medal in the all-around behind Sofia Raffaeli and Taisiia Onofriichuk. She qualified for all four apparatus finals and won the silver medal in the clubs final. In May, she won the gold medal in the all-around at Bulgarian National Championships. She also won gold in the hoop and ball finals and silver in the ribbon final, and she took 7th place in clubs.

From June 4 to 8, Nikolova competed in the 2025 Rhythmic Gymnastics European Championships in Tallinn, Estonia. She qualified for the three finals (she made mistakes on the ribbon). She won the silver medal in the all-around final behind Taisiia Onofriichuk, and the Bulgarian team (Eva Brezalieva, Dara Stoyanova, and the group) finished fifth. Nikolova won three gold medals in the hoop, ball, and clubs finals. In July, she was 4th in the all-around at the Milan World Cup. In the apparatus finals, she won the gold medal in clubs, silver medal in ball and bronze in hoop.

In August, Nikolova represented Bulgaria along with Eva Brezalieva at the 2025 World Championships. Together with the senior group, they won the silver medal in the team competition. Nikolova qualified for every apparatus final. In the all-around final, she made a mistake at the end of her hoop routine, but she otherwise put up good performances to win the silver medal behind Darja Varfolomeev and ahead of Sofia Raffaeli.

==== 2026 ====
Nikolova started the season on March 28-30, competing at Sofia World Cup. She won the silver medal in the all-around behind Taisiia Onofriichuk. In the apparatus finals, she won silver with ball and bronze with clubs. In May, she represented Bulgaria at the 2026 European Championships in Varna, and she won a silver medal in the all-around final. She won the gold medal in the team competition alongside Eva Brezalieva and the senior group. In the apparatus finals, she won gold with clubs and silver medals with ball and ribbon. She was 8th in the hoop final.

In August, Nikolova competed at the 2026 World Championships held in Frankfurt, Germany. She won a second consecutive silver in the all-around final, which also meant that she won Bulgaria an Olympic quota for the 2028 Summer Olympics, and she also won silver in the team competition with her teammates. In the apparatus finals, she won another silver in the ribbon final and gold in the clubs final; this was the first World apparatus title for a Bulgarian gymnast in 25 years, since Simona Peycheva won three at the 2001 World Championships. Afterward, Nikolova thanked her teammates and coaching team but declined to share any personal goals for the upcoming seasons.

== Achievements ==
- She is the first Bulgarian individual gymnast (since 2001) to have won an individual gold medal at a Rhythmic Gymnastics World Championships.

== Routine music information ==
Year	Apparatus	Music title
2026	Hoop	"Piano Concerto No. 1 in B-Flat Minor, Op. 23" by Pyotr Ilyich Tchaikovsky
2026	Ball	Les damnés (from Le Grand Bal OST) by Patrick De Oliveira and Dyptik
2026	Clubs	Earthquake by Andries de Haan / Kung Fu Performance "Yin Yang" by ESAEM
2026	Ribbon 1	She by Daniel Boaventura
2026	Ribbon 2	We No Speak Americano by Yolanda Be Cool & DCUP
2025
2025	Hoop	Mein Herr by Ute Lemper
2025	Ball	Les damnés (from Le Grand Bal OST) by Patrick De Oliveira and Dyptik
2025	Clubs	Earthquake by Andries de Haan / Kung Fu Performance "Yin Yang" by ESAEM
2025	Ribbon	She by Daniel Boaventura
2024
2024	Hoop	Hello by Lionel Richie
2024	Ball	Arabian Nights/Harvest Dance – Cover by Grace Park, feat. Waltz/Alan Menken
2024	Clubs	Хубава си моя горо by Kristina Kokorska & Krasimir Todorov
2024	Ribbon	Anastasia - Paris, Tu Nous Ouvres Ton by Stephen Flaherty & David Newman
2023
2023	Hoop	Mama by Gianna Nannini
2023	Ball	Arabian Nights/Harvest Dance – Cover by Grace Park, feat. Waltz/Alan Menken
2023	Clubs	Jailhouse Rock – Elvis Presley/ The Blues Brothers
2023	Ribbon	Paris Holds The Key (To Your Heart) – Lynn Ahrens, Stephen Flaherty
2022
2022	Hoop	Вярвам в чудеса (feat. Hassan & Ibrahim) by Krisia Todorova, Ku-Ku Band and Slavi Trifonov
2022	Ball	Beauty Never Lies by Bojana Stamenov
2022	Clubs	Maniac (remix) by Prime Orchestra
2022	Ribbon	Les Yeux Noirs (Dark Eyes) cover by Polmamoose ft The Vignes Rooftop Revival
2021	Hoop	
2021	Ball	All About That Bass by Postmodern Jukebox
2021	Clubs	Maniac (remix) by Prime Orchestra
2021	Ribbon	Infernal Galop (Can Can) by Jacques Offenbach
2020	Rope	Money, Money, Money by Meryl Streep & Julie Walters & Christine Baranski
2020	Ball	All About That Bass by Postmodern Jukebox
2020	Clubs	Flight of the Bumblebee by Rousseau
2020	Ribbon	Infernal Galop (Can Can) by Jacques Offenbach
2019	Rope	Money, Money, Money by Meryl Streep & Julie Walters & Christine Baranski
2019	Ball	
2019	Clubs	Flight of the Bumblebee by Rousseau
2019	Ribbon	Wake Me Up Before You Go-Go bt Wham!

== Competitive highlights ==
(Team competitions in seniors are held only at the World Championships, Europeans and other Continental Games.)

International: Senior
Year	Event	AA	Team	Hoop	Ball	Clubs	Ribbon
2026	World Championships Frankfurt	2nd	2nd	7th	13th (Q)	1st	2nd
2026	World Cup Milan	7th		34th(Q)	7th	2nd	1st
2026	European Championships Varna	2nd	1st	8th	2nd	1st	2nd
2026	World Cup Baku	3rd		2nd	3rd	6th	8th
2026	World Cup Sofia	2nd		4th	2nd	3rd	4th
2025	World Championships Rio de Janeiro	2nd	2nd	2nd	5th	3rd	2nd
2025	World Cup Milan	4th		3rd	2nd	1st	14th (Q)
2025	European Championships Tallinn	2nd	5th	1st	1st	1st	
2025	European Cup Burgas	2nd			1st	1st	1st
2025	World Cup Baku	3rd		7th	7th	2nd	4th
2025	World Cup Sofia	2nd		1st	1st	8th	20th (Q)
2025	IT Sofia Cup	1st		3rd (Q)	1st	1st	3rd (Q)
2024	Olympic Games	11th (Q)					
2024	World Challenge Cup Cluj-Napoca	1st		2nd	2nd	2nd	5th
2024	European Championships Budapest	1st	1st	2nd	5th		4th
2024	European Cup Baku	1st		2nd (Q)	8th (Q)	1st	4th (Q)
2024	World Cup Sofia	2nd		2nd	1st	9th (Q)	1st
2024	Grand Prix Marbella	1st		6th		1st	1st
2023	World Championships Valencia	4th	1st	8th	3rd	6th	
2023	World Cup Milan	3rd		6th	3rd	3rd	7th
2023	European Championships Baku	3rd	1st	7th	2nd	10th (Q)	3rd
2023	World Cup Baku	1st		1st	8th	1st	1st
2023	World Cup Sofia	1st		1st	1st	1st	4th
2023	World Cup Athens	2nd		6th	1st	9th (Q)	3rd
2023	Grand Prix Marbella	2nd		3rd	1st	1st	3rd
2023	Grand Prix Tartu	2nd		9th (Q)	1st	1st	3rd
2022	World Championships Sofia	3rd		2nd	11th (Q)	2nd	2nd
2022	World Challenge Cup Cluj-Napoca	2nd		3rd	5th	1st	8th
2022	European Championships Tel Aviv	3rd	1st	8th	4th	5th	4th
2022	World Cup Pesaro	3rd		2nd	3rd	3rd	14th(Q)
2022	World Challenge Cup Pamplona	2nd		8th	2nd	1st	4th
2022	World Cup Sofia	3rd		8th	11th (Q)	1st	2nd
2022	Grand Prix Marbella	3rd		1st	2nd	1st	
2021	World Challenge Cup Minsk	10th		10th (Q)	9th (Q)	10th (Q)	10th (Q)
2021	World Cup Pesaro	9th		10th (Q)	16th (Q)	8th	12th (Q)
International: Junior
Year	Event	AA	Team	Rope	Ball	Clubs	Ribbon
2020	Junior European Championships			6th (Q)	2nd	16th (Q)	1st
2019	Junior World Championships		8th			16th (Q)	
National
Year	Event	AA	Team	Hoop	Ball	Clubs	Ribbon
2025	Bulgarian Championships	1st		1st	1st	7th	2nd
2024	Bulgarian Championships	1st					
2023	Bulgarian Championships	1st		3rd	1st	1st	3rd
Q = Qualifications (Did not advance to Event Final due to the 2 gymnast per country rule, only Top 8 highest score); WR = World Record; WD = Withdrew; NT = No Team Competition; OC = Out of Competition(competed but scores not counted for qualifications/results), DNS = Did Not Start, DNF = Did Not Finish

== See also ==
- List of medalists at the Rhythmic Gymnastics Junior European Championships
- List of medalists at the Rhythmic Gymnastics World Championships
