= List of gymnasts at the 2024 Summer Olympics =

This is a list of the gymnasts who are set to represent their respective countries at the 2024 Summer Olympics in Paris, France from 27 July to 10 August 2024. Gymnasts across three disciplines (artistic gymnastics, rhythmic gymnastics and trampoline) will participate in the Games.

== Male artistic gymnasts ==
	Name	Country	Date of birth
Youngest competitor	Ángel Barajas	Colombia	12 August 2006 (aged 17)
Oldest competitor	Vahagn Davtyan	Armenia	18 August 1988 (aged 35)

=== Team ===
NOC	Name	Date of birth	Hometown	Reserves
Canada	Zachary Clay	5 July 1995 (aged 29)	Chilliwack, British Columbia	Ioannis Chronopoulos
Canada	René Cournoyer	23 April 1997 (aged 27)	Repentigny, Quebec	Ioannis Chronopoulos
Canada	Félix Dolci	5 May 2002 (aged 22)	Saint-Eustache, Quebec	Ioannis Chronopoulos
Canada	William Émard	17 March 2000 (aged 24)	Laval, Quebec	Ioannis Chronopoulos
Canada	Samuel Zakutney	6 October 1998 (aged 25)	Ottawa, Ontario	Ioannis Chronopoulos
China	Liu Yang	10 September 1994 (aged 29)	Anshan	Lan Xingyu; Shi Cong; You Hao
China	Su Weide	19 March 2000 (aged 24)	Guangdong	Lan Xingyu; Shi Cong; You Hao
China	Xiao Ruoteng	30 January 1996 (aged 28)	Beijing	Lan Xingyu; Shi Cong; You Hao
China	Zhang Boheng	4 March 2000 (aged 24)	Hunan	Lan Xingyu; Shi Cong; You Hao
China	Zou Jingyuan	3 January 1998 (aged 26)	Yibin	Lan Xingyu; Shi Cong; You Hao
Germany	Pascal Brendel	15 September 2003 (aged 20)	Wehrheim	Milan Hosseini; Glenn Trebing; Alexander Kunz
Germany	Lukas Dauser	15 June 1993 (aged 31)	Ebersberg	Milan Hosseini; Glenn Trebing; Alexander Kunz
Germany	Nils Dunkel	20 February 1997 (aged 27)	Erfurt	Milan Hosseini; Glenn Trebing; Alexander Kunz
Germany	Timo Eder	11 June 2005 (aged 19)	Ludwigsburg	Milan Hosseini; Glenn Trebing; Alexander Kunz
Germany	Andreas Toba	2 October 1990 (aged 33)	Hanover	Milan Hosseini; Glenn Trebing; Alexander Kunz
Great Britain	Joe Fraser	6 December 1998 (aged 25)	Birmingham	James Hall; Courtney Tulloch
Great Britain	Harry Hepworth	6 December 2003 (aged 20)	Leeds	James Hall; Courtney Tulloch
Great Britain	Jake Jarman	3 December 2001 (aged 22)	Peterborough	James Hall; Courtney Tulloch
Great Britain	Luke Whitehouse	2 July 2002 (aged 22)	Halifax	James Hall; Courtney Tulloch
Great Britain	Max Whitlock	13 January 1993 (aged 31)	Hemel Hempstead	James Hall; Courtney Tulloch
Italy	Yumin Abbadini	6 May 2001 (aged 23)	Bergamo	
Italy	Nicola Bartolini	2 February 1996 (aged 28)	Milan	
Italy	Lorenzo Minh Casali	12 September 2002 (aged 21)	Offagna	
Italy	Mario Macchiati	27 November 1999 (aged 24)	Fermo	
Italy	Carlo Macchini	5 May 1996 (aged 28)	Ancona	
Japan	Daiki Hashimoto	7 August 2001 (aged 22)	Chiba	
Japan	Kazuma Kaya	19 November 1996 (aged 27)	Funabashi	
Japan	Shinnosuke Oka	31 October 2003 (aged 20)	Okayama	
Japan	Takaaki Sugino	18 October 1998 (aged 25)	Mie	
Japan	Wataru Tanigawa	23 July 1996 (aged 28)	Funabashi	
Netherlands	Loran de Munck	9 May 1999 (aged 25)	Haarlem	Amine Abaidi; Rick Jacobs; Yazz Ramsahai
Netherlands	Martijn de Veer	21 November 2002 (aged 21)	Rotterdam	Amine Abaidi; Rick Jacobs; Yazz Ramsahai
Netherlands	Jermain Grünberg	2 September 2000 (aged 23)	Tilburg	Amine Abaidi; Rick Jacobs; Yazz Ramsahai
Netherlands	Frank Rijken	24 November 1996 (aged 27)	Westvoorne	Amine Abaidi; Rick Jacobs; Yazz Ramsahai
Netherlands	Casimir Schmidt	31 October 1995 (aged 28)	Hoofddorp	Amine Abaidi; Rick Jacobs; Yazz Ramsahai
Spain	Néstor Abad	29 March 1993 (aged 31)	Madrid	
Spain	Thierno Diallo	22 November 2000 (aged 23)	Manresa	
Spain	Nicolau Mir	10 May 2000 (aged 24)	Palma de Mallorca	
Spain	Joel Plata	20 March 1998 (aged 26)	Barcelona	
Spain	Rayderley Zapata	26 May 1993 (aged 31)	Las Palmas	
Switzerland	Luca Giubellini	1 April 2003 (aged 21)	Rebstein	Christian Baumann; Andrin Frey; Moreno Kratter
Switzerland	Matteo Giubellini	7 November 2004 (aged 19)	Rebstein	Christian Baumann; Andrin Frey; Moreno Kratter
Switzerland	Florian Langenegger	26 March 2003 (aged 21)	Bühler	Christian Baumann; Andrin Frey; Moreno Kratter
Switzerland	Noe Seifert	29 October 1998 (aged 25)	Sevelen	Christian Baumann; Andrin Frey; Moreno Kratter
Switzerland	Taha Serhani	25 March 1995 (aged 29)	Huttwil	Christian Baumann; Andrin Frey; Moreno Kratter
Turkey	Ferhat Arıcan	28 July 1993 (aged 30)	İzmir	
Turkey	Adem Asil	21 February 1999 (aged 25)	Alexandria, Egypt	
Turkey	İbrahim Çolak	7 January 1995 (aged 29)	İzmir	
Turkey	Emre Dodanlı	24 October 2002 (aged 21)	Milton, Canada	
Turkey	Ahmet Önder	11 July 1996 (aged 28)	Istanbul	
Ukraine	Nazar Chepurnyi	3 September 2002 (aged 21)	Cherkasy	
Ukraine	Illia Kovtun	10 August 2003 (aged 20)	Cherkasy	
Ukraine	Igor Radivilov	19 October 1992 (aged 31)	Mariupol	
Ukraine	Radomyr Stelmakh	18 August 2005 (aged 18)	Zaporizhzhia	
Ukraine	Oleg Verniaiev	29 September 1993 (aged 30)	Donetsk	
United States	Asher Hong	23 March 2004 (aged 20)	Tomball, Texas	Shane Wiskus; Khoi Young
United States	Paul Juda	7 July 2001 (aged 23)	Deerfield, Illinois	Shane Wiskus; Khoi Young
United States	Brody Malone	7 January 2000 (aged 24)	Summerville, Georgia	Shane Wiskus; Khoi Young
United States	Stephen Nedoroscik	28 October 1998 (aged 25)	Worcester, Massachusetts	Shane Wiskus; Khoi Young
United States	Fred Richard	23 April 2004 (aged 20)	Stoughton, Massachusetts	Shane Wiskus; Khoi Young

=== Individual ===
NOC	Name	Date of birth	Hometown
Australia	Jesse Moore	13 February 2003 (aged 21)	Ashford
Armenia	Artur Davtyan	8 August 1992 (aged 31)	Yerevan
Armenia	Vahagn Davtyan	18 August 1988 (aged 35)	Yerevan
Belgium	Glen Cuyle	25 July 2002 (aged 22)	Izegem
Belgium	Noah Kuavita	28 July 1999 (aged 24)	Borgerhout
Belgium	Luka van den Keybus	14 April 1997 (aged 27)	Lokeren
Brazil	Arthur Mariano	18 September 1993 (aged 30)	Campinas
Brazil	Diogo Soares	12 April 2002 (aged 22)	Piracicaba
Bulgaria	Kevin Penev	30 March 2000 (aged 24)	Penfield, U.S.
Chinese Taipei	Tang Chia-hung	23 September 1996 (aged 27)	Taipei
Colombia	Ángel Barajas	12 August 2006 (aged 17)	Cúcuta
Croatia	Aurel Benović	14 July 2000 (aged 24)	Osijek
Croatia	Tin Srbić	11 September 1996 (aged 27)	Zagreb
Cyprus	Marios Georgiou	10 November 1997 (aged 26)	Limassol
Dominican Republic	Audrys Nin Reyes	2 January 1995 (aged 29)	Barahona
Egypt	Omar Mohamed	10 February 1999 (aged 25)	Alexandria
France	Samir Aït Saïd	1 November 1989 (aged 34)	Champigny-sur-Marne
Greece	Eleftherios Petrounias	30 November 1990 (aged 33)	Athens
Hong Kong	Shek Wai-hung	10 October 1991 (aged 32)	Hong Kong
Hungary	Krisztofer Mészáros	5 September 2001 (aged 22)	Győr
Iran	Mahdi Olfati	6 March 2001 (aged 23)	Gorgan
Ireland	Rhys McClenaghan	21 July 1999 (aged 25)	Newtownards, U.K.
Israel	Artem Dolgopyat	16 June 1997 (aged 27)	Dnipro, Ukraine
Jordan	Ahmad Abu Al-Soud	7 May 1995 (aged 29)	Amman
Kazakhstan	Milad Karimi	21 June 1999 (aged 25)	Almaty
Kazakhstan	Nariman Kurbanov	6 December 1997 (aged 26)	Almaty
Lithuania	Robert Tvorogal	5 October 1994 (aged 29)	Vilnius
Philippines	Carlos Yulo	16 February 2000 (aged 24)	Malate
Romania	Andrei Muntean	30 January 1993 (aged 31)	Sibiu
South Korea	Hur Woong	18 December 1999 (aged 24)	Seoul
South Korea	Lee Jun-ho	22 October 1995 (aged 28)	Seoul
South Korea	Ryu Sung-hyun	22 October 2002 (aged 21)	Seoul
Syria	Lais Najjar	8 October 2002 (aged 21)	Chicago, U.S.
Uzbekistan	Rasuljon Abdurakhimov	3 October 1996 (aged 27)	Fergana
Uzbekistan	Abdulla Azimov	20 March 1996 (aged 28)	Tashkent
Uzbekistan	Khabibullo Ergashev	6 May 1999 (aged 25)	Fergana

== Female artistic gymnasts ==
	Name	Country	Date of birth
Youngest competitor	Hezly Rivera	United States	4 June 2008 (aged 16)
Oldest competitor	Jade Barbosa	Brazil	1 July 1991 (aged 33)

=== Team ===
NOC	Name	Date of birth	Hometown	Reserves
Australia	Kate McDonald	1 August 2000 (aged 23)	Balwyn	Kate Sayer; Annabelle Burrows
Australia	Emma Nedov	11 March 1996 (aged 28)	Sydney	Kate Sayer; Annabelle Burrows
Australia	Ruby Pass	17 May 2007 (aged 17)	Figtree	Kate Sayer; Annabelle Burrows
Australia	Breanna Scott	12 December 2001 (aged 22)	Sydney	Kate Sayer; Annabelle Burrows
Australia	Emily Whitehead	11 December 2000 (aged 23)	Mornington	Kate Sayer; Annabelle Burrows
Brazil	Rebeca Andrade	8 May 1999 (aged 25)	Guarulhos	Andreza Lima; Carolyne Pedro
Brazil	Jade Barbosa	1 July 1991 (aged 33)	Rio de Janeiro	Andreza Lima; Carolyne Pedro
Brazil	Lorrane Oliveira	13 April 1998 (aged 26)	Rio de Janeiro	Andreza Lima; Carolyne Pedro
Brazil	Flávia Saraiva	30 September 1999 (aged 24)	Rio de Janeiro	Andreza Lima; Carolyne Pedro
Brazil	Júlia Soares	24 August 2005 (aged 18)	Colombo	Andreza Lima; Carolyne Pedro
Canada	Ellie Black	8 September 1995 (aged 28)	Halifax, Nova Scotia	Emma Spence; Sydney Turner; Rose-Kaying Woo
Canada	Cassie Lee	15 October 2005 (aged 18)	Toronto, Ontario	Emma Spence; Sydney Turner; Rose-Kaying Woo
Canada	Shallon Olsen	10 July 2000 (aged 24)	Surrey, British Columbia	Emma Spence; Sydney Turner; Rose-Kaying Woo
Canada	Ava Stewart	30 September 2005 (aged 18)	Bowmanville, Ontario	Emma Spence; Sydney Turner; Rose-Kaying Woo
Canada	Aurélie Tran	25 May 2006 (aged 18)	Repentigny, Quebec	Emma Spence; Sydney Turner; Rose-Kaying Woo
China	Luo Huan	6 March 2000 (aged 24)	Xiantao	Du Siyu; Huang Zhuofan; Zhang Qingying
China	Ou Yushan	13 January 2004 (aged 20)	Guangdong	Du Siyu; Huang Zhuofan; Zhang Qingying
China	Qiu Qiyuan	24 May 2007 (aged 17)	Fujian	Du Siyu; Huang Zhuofan; Zhang Qingying
China	Zhang Yihan	24 January 2008 (aged 16)	Henan	Du Siyu; Huang Zhuofan; Zhang Qingying
China	Zhou Yaqin	12 November 2005 (aged 18)	Hunan	Du Siyu; Huang Zhuofan; Zhang Qingying
France	Marine Boyer	22 May 2000 (aged 24)	Saint-Benoît, Réunion	
France	Coline Devillard	9 October 2000 (aged 23)	Digoin	
France	Mélanie de Jesus dos Santos	5 March 2000 (aged 24)	Schœlcher, Martinique	
France	Morgane Osyssek	15 December 2002 (aged 21)	Haguenau	
France	Ming van Eijken	3 April 2008 (aged 16)	Lyon	
Great Britain	Becky Downie	24 January 1992 (aged 32)	Nottingham	Ruby Stacey; Charlotte Booth
Great Britain	Ruby Evans	17 March 2007 (aged 17)	Cardiff	Ruby Stacey; Charlotte Booth
Great Britain	Georgia-Mae Fenton	2 November 2000 (aged 23)	Kent	Ruby Stacey; Charlotte Booth
Great Britain	Alice Kinsella	13 March 2001 (aged 23)	Sutton Coldfield	Ruby Stacey; Charlotte Booth
Great Britain	Abigail Martin	19 April 2008 (aged 16)	Devon	Ruby Stacey; Charlotte Booth
Italy	Angela Andreoli	6 June 2006 (aged 18)	Brescia	Martina Maggio
Italy	Alice D'Amato	7 February 2003 (aged 21)	Genoa	Martina Maggio
Italy	Manila Esposito	2 November 2006 (aged 17)	Boscotrecase	Martina Maggio
Italy	Elisa Iorio	21 March 2003 (aged 21)	Modena	Martina Maggio
Italy	Giorgia Villa	23 February 2003 (aged 21)	Ponte San Pietro	Martina Maggio
Japan	Rina Kishi	23 September 2007 (aged 16)	Toda	Aiko Sugihara; Chiaki Hatakeda
Japan	Haruka Nakamura	18 May 2008 (aged 16)	Osaka	Aiko Sugihara; Chiaki Hatakeda
Japan	Mana Okamura	28 May 2005 (aged 19)	Mie	Aiko Sugihara; Chiaki Hatakeda
Japan	Kohane Ushioku	17 August 2004 (aged 19)	Tokyo	Aiko Sugihara; Chiaki Hatakeda
Japan	No fifth athlete (Note: Shoko Miyata was removed from the Japanese team due to smoking and drinking alcohol, which is prohibited in Japan for those under 20. No athlete substitution was made due to Miyata being removed for something other than injury.)			Aiko Sugihara; Chiaki Hatakeda
Netherlands	Sanna Veerman	29 January 2002 (aged 22)	Edam-Volendam	Floor Slooff
Netherlands	Naomi Visser	21 August 2001 (aged 22)	Papendrecht	Floor Slooff
Netherlands	Tisha Volleman	26 October 1999 (aged 24)	Eindhoven	Floor Slooff
Netherlands	Lieke Wevers	17 September 1991 (aged 32)	Heerenveen	Floor Slooff
Netherlands	Sanne Wevers	17 September 1991 (aged 32)	Heerenveen	Floor Slooff
Romania	Ana Bărbosu	26 July 2006 (aged 18)	Focșani	
Romania	Lilia Cosman	6 August 2007 (aged 16)	Lansing, U.S.	
Romania	Amalia Ghigoarță	28 January 2007 (aged 17)	Lugoj	
Romania	Andreea Preda	23 May 2006 (aged 18)	Constanța	
Romania	Sabrina Voinea	4 June 2007 (aged 17)	Constanța	
South Korea	Eom Do-hyun	26 February 2003 (aged 21)	Seoul	
South Korea	Lee Da-yeong	28 December 2004 (aged 19)	Seoul	
South Korea	Lee Yun-seo	3 May 2003 (aged 21)	Seoul	
South Korea	Shin Sol-yi	14 July 2004 (aged 20)	Chungju	
South Korea	Yeo Seo-jeong	20 February 2002 (aged 22)	Yongin	
United States	Simone Biles	14 March 1997 (aged 27)	Spring, Texas	Joscelyn Roberson; Leanne Wong
United States	Jade Carey	27 May 2000 (aged 24)	Phoenix, Arizona	Joscelyn Roberson; Leanne Wong
United States	Jordan Chiles	15 April 2001 (aged 23)	Vancouver, Washington	Joscelyn Roberson; Leanne Wong
United States	Sunisa Lee	9 March 2003 (aged 21)	Saint Paul, Minnesota	Joscelyn Roberson; Leanne Wong
United States	Hezly Rivera	4 June 2008 (aged 16)	Oradell, New Jersey	Joscelyn Roberson; Leanne Wong

=== Individual ===
NOC	Name	Date of birth	Hometown
Algeria	Kaylia Nemour	30 December 2006 (aged 17)	Saint-Benoît-la-Forêt, France
Austria	Charlize Mörz	10 October 2005 (aged 18)	Eisenstadt
Belgium	Maellyse Brassart	22 June 2001 (aged 23)	Uccle
Belgium	Nina Derwael	26 March 2000 (aged 24)	Ghent
Bulgaria	Valentina Georgieva	28 July 2006 (aged 17)	Sofia
Chinese Taipei	Ting Hua-tien	11 October 2002 (aged 21)	Taipei
Colombia	Luisa Blanco	18 November 2001 (aged 22)	Dallas, U.S.
Czech Republic	Soňa Artamonova	9 October 2007 (aged 16)	Murmansk, Russia
Egypt	Jana Mahmoud	17 August 2004 (aged 19)	Giza
Germany	Helen Kevric	21 March 2008 (aged 16)	Ostfildern
Germany	Pauline Schäfer-Betz	4 January 1997 (aged 27)	Chemnitz
Germany	Sarah Voss	21 October 1999 (aged 24)	Dormagen
Haiti	Lynnzee Brown	4 September 1998 (aged 25)	Kansas City, U.S.
Hungary	Csenge Bácskay	3 April 2003 (aged 21)	Budapest
Hungary	Bettina Lili Czifra	20 April 2007 (aged 17)	Dunaújváros
Hungary	Zója Székely	5 May 2003 (aged 21)	Budapest
Indonesia	Rifda Irfanaluthfi	16 October 1999 (aged 24)	Jakarta
Israel	Lihie Raz	14 September 2003 (aged 20)	Ramat HaSharon
Mexico	Natalia Escalera	3 July 2002 (aged 22)	Ensenada
Mexico	Alexa Moreno	8 August 1994 (aged 29)	Mexicali
Mexico	Ahtziri Sandoval	5 October 1996 (aged 27)	Guadalajara
New Zealand	Georgia-Rose Brown	22 January 1995 (aged 29)	Auchenflower, Australia
North Korea	An Chang-ok	23 April 2003 (aged 21)	Pyongyang
Panama	Hillary Heron	29 January 2004 (aged 20)	Panama City
Philippines	Aleah Finnegan	4 January 2003 (aged 21)	Lee's Summit, U.S.
Philippines	Emma Malabuyo	5 November 2002 (aged 21)	Milpitas, U.S.
Philippines	Levi Ruivivar	3 May 2006 (aged 18)	Los Angeles, U.S.
Portugal	Filipa Martins	9 January 1996 (aged 28)	Porto
Slovenia	Lucija Hribar	15 October 2001 (aged 22)	Ljubljana
South Africa	Caitlin Rooskrantz	5 November 2001 (aged 22)	Johannesburg
Spain	Laura Casabuena	26 December 2005 (aged 18)	Alcoy
Spain	Ana Pérez	14 December 1997 (aged 26)	Seville
Spain	Alba Petisco	1 January 2003 (aged 21)	Villarino de los Aires
Switzerland	Lena Bickel	22 December 2004 (aged 19)	Ticino
Ukraine	Anna Lashchevska	20 November 2007 (aged 16)	Ivano-Frankivsk

== Rhythmic gymnasts ==
	Name	Country	Date of birth
Youngest competitor	Vera Tugolukova	Cyprus	16 September 2008 (aged 15)
Oldest competitor	Ekaterina Vedeneeva	Slovenia	23 June 1994 (aged 30)

=== Individual ===
NOC	Name	Date of birth	Hometown
Australia	Alexandra Kiroi-Bogatyreva	4 March 2002 (aged 22)	Melbourne
Azerbaijan	Zohra Aghamirova	8 August 2001 (aged 23)	Baku
Brazil	Bárbara Domingos	2 March 2000 (aged 24)	Curitiba
Bulgaria	Boryana Kaleyn	23 August 2000 (aged 23)	Sofia
Bulgaria	Stiliana Nikolova	22 August 2005 (aged 18)	Cairo, Egypt
China	Wang Zilu	18 June 2003 (aged 21)	Guangdong
Cyprus	Vera Tugolukova	16 September 2008 (aged 15)	Moscow, Russia
Egypt	Aliaa Saleh	4 August 2004 (aged 20)	Giza
France	Hélène Karbanov	29 December 2004 (aged 19)	Calais
Germany	Margarita Kolosov	11 March 2004 (aged 20)	Potsdam
Germany	Darja Varfolomeev	4 November 2006 (aged 17)	Barnaul, Russia
Hungary	Fanni Pigniczki	23 January 2000 (aged 24)	Budapest
Kazakhstan	Elzhana Taniyeva	6 September 2005 (aged 18)	Almaty
Israel	Daria Atamanov	6 December 2005 (aged 18)	Tel Aviv
Italy	Sofia Raffaeli	19 January 2004 (aged 20)	Chiaravalle
Italy	Milena Baldassarri	16 October 2001 (aged 22)	Ravenna
Laos	Praewa Misato Philaphandeth	6 December 2004 (aged 19)	Bangkok, Thailand
Romania	Annaliese Dragan	15 September 2005 (aged 18)	Irvine, U.S.
Slovenia	Ekaterina Vedeneeva	23 June 1994 (aged 30)	Irkutsk, Russia
Spain	Polina Berezina	5 December 1997 (aged 26)	Alicante
Spain	Alba Bautista	13 July 2002 (aged 22)	Teruel
United States	Evita Griskenas	3 December 2000 (aged 23)	Orland Park, Illinois
Ukraine	Taisiia Onofriichuk	26 May 2008 (aged 16)	Kyiv
Uzbekistan	Takhmina Ikromova	6 August 2004 (aged 20)	Samarkand

=== Group ===
NOC	Name	Date of birth	Hometown	Reserves
Australia	Saskia Broedelet	20 February 2004 (aged 20)	Waverley	
Australia	Emmanouela Frroku	31 July 2007 (aged 17)	Brisbane	
Australia	Lidiia Iakovleva	28 August 2003 (aged 20)	Brisbane	
Australia	Phoebe Learmont	23 June 2005 (aged 19)	Jamboree Heights	
Australia	Jessica Weintraub	20 March 2007 (aged 17)	Melbourne	
Azerbaijan	Zeynab Hummatova	6 December 1999 (aged 24)	Shaki	
Azerbaijan	Yelyzaveta Luzan	14 March 2003 (aged 21)	Baku	
Azerbaijan	Darya Sorokina	29 November 2002 (aged 21)	Baku	
Azerbaijan	Gullu Aghalarzade	25 October 2003 (aged 20)	Baku	
Azerbaijan	Laman Alimuradova	29 November 2004 (aged 19)	Baku	
Brazil	Déborah Medrado	13 July 2002 (aged 22)	Serra	Mariana Pinto; Giovanna Oliveira; Gabriella Coradine; Bárbara Urquiza
Brazil	Sofia Pereira	15 September 2003 (aged 20)	Vitória	Mariana Pinto; Giovanna Oliveira; Gabriella Coradine; Bárbara Urquiza
Brazil	Nicole Pircio	22 July 2002 (aged 22)	Piracicaba	Mariana Pinto; Giovanna Oliveira; Gabriella Coradine; Bárbara Urquiza
Brazil	Victória Borges	13 July 2002 (aged 22)	Aracaju	Mariana Pinto; Giovanna Oliveira; Gabriella Coradine; Bárbara Urquiza
Brazil	Maria Eduarda Arakaki	12 August 2003 (aged 20)	Maceió	Mariana Pinto; Giovanna Oliveira; Gabriella Coradine; Bárbara Urquiza
Bulgaria	Magdalina Minevska	2 December 2005 (aged 18)	Sofia	
Bulgaria	Sofia Ivanova	15 September 2005 (aged 18)	Sofia	
Bulgaria	Kamelia Petrova	1 May 2006 (aged 18)	Sofia	
Bulgaria	Rachel Stoyanov	14 March 2003 (aged 21)	Los Angeles, U.S.	
Bulgaria	Margarita Vasileva	30 May 2005 (aged 19)	Sofia	
China	Huang Zhangjiayang	15 February 2000 (aged 24)	Sichuan	
China	Ding Xinyi	27 August 2004 (aged 19)	Chongqing	
China	Wang Lanjing	10 May 2005 (aged 19)	Hangzhou	
China	Guo Qiqi	7 August 1998 (aged 26)	Chongqing	
China	Hao Ting	23 March 2001 (aged 23)	Jiangsu	
Egypt	Abeer Ramadan	31 July 2007 (aged 17)	Cairo	Jomana Abouelmagd
Egypt	Farida Hussein	7 February 2006 (aged 18)	Cairo	Jomana Abouelmagd
Egypt	Johara Eldeeb	24 May 2007 (aged 17)	Cairo	Jomana Abouelmagd
Egypt	Amina Sobeih	18 August 2006 (aged 17)	Cairo	Jomana Abouelmagd
Egypt	Lamar Behairi	1 August 2007 (aged 17)	Cairo	Jomana Abouelmagd
France	Manelle Inaho	26 September 2003 (aged 20)	Villeneuve-Saint-Georges	
France	Lozea Vilarino	3 February 2003 (aged 21)	Rillieux-la-Pape	
France	Justine Lavit	19 July 2006 (aged 18)	Tarbes	
France	Ainhoa Dot-Espinosa	15 May 2005 (aged 19)	Orléans	
France	Celia Joseph-Noel	5 November 2003 (aged 20)	Issy-les-Moulineaux	
Germany	Anja Kosan	12 December 2002 (aged 21)	Berlin	Melanie Dargel
Germany	Daniella Kromm	17 February 2004 (aged 20)	Waiblingen	Melanie Dargel
Germany	Alina Oganesyan	13 June 2004 (aged 20)	Tashkent, Uzbekistan	Melanie Dargel
Germany	Hannah Vester	2 May 2006 (aged 18)	Zornheim	Melanie Dargel
Germany	Emilia Wickert	25 January 2007 (aged 17)	Ulm	Melanie Dargel
Israel	Shani Bakanov	27 February 2006 (aged 18)	Haifa	
Israel	Diana Svertsov	15 November 2004 (aged 19)	Bat Yam	
Israel	Romi Paritzki	17 June 2004 (aged 20)	Netanya	
Israel	Ofir Shaham	23 November 2004 (aged 19)	Zikhron Ya'akov	
Israel	Adar Friedmann	18 July 2006 (aged 18)	Petah Tikva	
Italy	Laura Paris	7 September 2002 (aged 21)	Rho	
Italy	Martina Centofanti	19 May 1998 (aged 26)	Rome	
Italy	Agnese Duranti	18 December 2000 (aged 23)	Spoleto	
Italy	Alessia Maurelli	22 August 1996 (aged 27)	Rivoli	
Italy	Daniela Mogurean	16 July 2001 (aged 23)	Mestre	
Mexico	Dalia Alcocer	2 January 2004 (aged 20)	Mérida	
Mexico	Julia Gutiérrez	13 September 2007 (aged 16)	Mérida	
Mexico	Sofia Flores	20 December 2004 (aged 19)	Coahuila	
Mexico	Kimberly Salazar	24 April 2004 (aged 20)	Xalapa	
Mexico	Adirem Tejeda	21 June 2002 (aged 22)	Yucatán	
Spain	Inés Bergua	29 May 2004 (aged 20)	Huesca	
Spain	Mireia Martínez	21 April 2005 (aged 19)	La Pobla de Vallbona	
Spain	Patricia Pérez	8 August 2004 (aged 20)	Valencia	
Spain	Salma Solaun	2 March 2005 (aged 19)	Vitoria-Gasteiz	
Spain	Ana Arnau	20 September 2005 (aged 18)	Madrid	
Ukraine	Alina Melnyk	17 May 2005 (aged 19)	Lviv	
Ukraine	Diana Baieva	9 August 2004 (aged 20)	Makiivka	
Ukraine	Kira Shyrykina	4 June 2008 (aged 16)	Dnipro	
Ukraine	Valeriia Peremeta	25 September 2007 (aged 16)	Mykolaiv	
Ukraine	Mariia Vysochanska	10 September 2002 (aged 21)	Lviv	
Uzbekistan	Evelina Atalyants	1 July 2007 (aged 17)	Tashkent	
Uzbekistan	Shakhzoda Ibragimova	24 November 2002 (aged 21)	Nukus	
Uzbekistan	Mumtozabonu Iskhokzoda	31 December 2005 (aged 18)	Tashkent	
Uzbekistan	Amaliya Mamedova	29 August 2008 (aged 15)	Samarkand	
Uzbekistan	Irodakhon Sadikova	5 September 2007 (aged 16)	Tashkent	

== Male trampoline gymnasts ==
	Name	Country	Date of birth
Youngest competitor	Brock Batty	Australia	4 January 2007 (aged 17)
Oldest competitor	Ángel Hernández	Colombia	6 January 1995 (aged 29)

NOC	Name	Date of birth	Hometown
Austria	Benny Wizani	26 June 2001 (aged 23)	Tulln an der Donau
Australia	Brock Batty	4 January 2007 (aged 17)	Frankston
Brazil	Rayan Dutra	29 March 2002 (aged 22)	Belo Horizonte
China	Wang Zisai	18 June 2006 (aged 18)	Jiangsu
China	Yan Langyu	31 August 1999 (aged 24)	Hunan
Colombia	Ángel Hernández	6 January 1995 (aged 29)	Albacete, Spain
France	Pierre Gouzou	17 December 1998 (aged 25)	Meaux
Germany	Fabian Vogel	12 March 1995 (aged 29)	Düsseldorf
Great Britain	Zak Perzamanos	17 June 2003 (aged 21)	Liverpool
Individual Neutral Athletes (Note: Athletes from Belarus and Russia will compete under the name Individual Neutral Athletes (AIN) at the 2024 Summer Olympics due to the Russian invasion of Ukraine.)	Ivan Litvinovich	26 June 2001 (aged 23)	Vilyeyka, Belarus
Japan	Ryusei Nishioka	1 November 2003 (aged 20)	Osaka
Kazakhstan	Danil Mussabayev	13 September 1998 (aged 25)	Karaganda
New Zealand	Dylan Schmidt	7 January 1997 (aged 27)	Te Anau
Portugal	Gabriel Albuquerque	9 April 2006 (aged 18)	Lisbon
Spain	David Vega	4 August 1998 (aged 25)	Barcelona
United States	Aliaksei Shostak	8 February 1995 (aged 29)	Lafayette, Louisiana

== Female trampoline gymnasts ==
	Name	Country	Date of birth
Youngest competitor	Anzhela Bladtceva	Individual Neutral Athletes	23 July 2005 (aged 19)
Oldest competitor	Luba Golovina	Georgia	20 April 1990 (aged 34)

NOC	Name	Date of birth	Hometown
Azerbaijan	Seljan Mahsudova	28 August 2003 (aged 20)	Baku
Brazil	Camilla Gomes	27 May 1994 (aged 30)	Rio de Janeiro
Canada	Sophiane Méthot	3 August 1998 (aged 25)	La Prairie, Quebec
China	Hu Yicheng	13 November 1998 (aged 25)	Shanxi
China	Zhu Xueying	2 March 1998 (aged 26)	Beijing
Egypt	Malak Hamza	5 November 2001 (aged 22)	Giza
France	Léa Labrousse	6 April 1997 (aged 27)	Beaumont
Georgia	Luba Golovina	20 April 1990 (aged 34)	Tbilisi
Great Britain	Bryony Page	10 December 1990 (aged 33)	Wrenbury-cum-Frith
Great Britain	Isabelle Songhurst	16 January 1999 (aged 25)	Poole
Individual Neutral Athletes	Anzhela Bladtceva	23 July 2005 (aged 19)	Saint Petersburg, Russia
Individual Neutral Athletes	Viyaleta Bardzilouskaya	7 June 2005 (aged 19)	Mogilev, Belarus
Japan	Hikaru Mori	7 July 1999 (aged 25)	Tokyo
New Zealand	Maddie Davidson	8 January 1999 (aged 25)	Christchurch
Spain	Noemi Romero Rosario	4 October 2000 (aged 23)	Madrid
United States	Jessica Stevens	5 July 2000 (aged 24)	Ellicott City, Maryland
