= 2025 in rhythmic gymnastics =

Below is a list of notable rhythmic gymnastics international events scheduled to be held in 2025 as well as the medalists.

== Retirements ==
Gymnasts who announced retirements in 2025
Gymnast	Country	Date	Ref
Elzhana Taniyeva	Kazakhstan	15 January 2025	
Alexandra Kiroi-Bogatyreva	Australia	20 February 2025	
Arzu Jalilova	Azerbaijan	18 March 2025	
Ekaterina Vedeneeva	Slovenia	9 May 2025	
Alessia Verstappen	Belgium	14 June 2025	
Kamila Grigorenko	Estonia	29 June 2025	
Polina Berezina	Spain	4 September 2025	
Sofia Flores	Mexico	14 September 2025	
Emily Beznos	Moldova	21 September 2025	
Ayuka Suzuki	Japan	3 October 2025	
Rinako Inaki	Japan	3 October 2025	
Yael Aloni Goldblatt	Israel	11 October 2025	
Anastasiia Salos	Belarus	19 October 2025	
Eleonora Tagliabue	Italy	22 October 2025	
Giulia Dellafelice	Italy	24 October 2025	
Szofia Bernat	Hungary	29 November 2025	
Yana Golovan	United States	4 December 2025	
Ng Joe Ee	Malaysia	17 December 2025	
Lidiia Iakovleva	Australia	31 December 2025	

== Nationality changes ==
Gymnasts who changed nationalities in 2025
Gymnast	From	To	Ref
Anna Khutsishvili	Georgia	France	
Olivia Fischer	United States	El Salvador	
Eva Blanka Gyulai	Hungary	Portugal	
Stephanie Drositis	France	United Kingdom	

== Calendar of events ==
Date	Location	Event	Individual winners	Group winners
April 4–6	(Bulgaria) Sofia	FIG World Cup	AA: (Ukraine) Taisiia Onofriichuk HO: (Bulgaria) Stiliana Nikolova BA: (Bulgaria) Stiliana Nikolova CL: (Ukraine) Taisiia Onofriichuk RI: (Ukraine) Taisiia Onofriichuk	AA: Spain 5 RI: Bulgaria 3 BA & 2 HO: Spain
April 18–20	(Azerbaijan) Baku	FIG World Cup	AA: (Italy) Sofia Raffaeli HO: (Ukraine) Taisiia Onofriichuk BA: (Cyprus) Vera Tugolukova CL: (Germany) Darja Varfolomeev RI: (Germany) Darja Varfolomeev	AA: Bulgaria 5 RI: China 3 BA & 2 HO: Japan
April 25–27	(Uzbekistan) Tashkent	FIG World Cup	AA: (Uzbekistan) Takhmina Ikromova HO: (Uzbekistan) Takhmina Ikromova BA: (Germany) Darja Varfolomeev CL: (Germany) Darja Varfolomeev RI: (Germany) Darja Varfolomeev	AA: Poland 5 RI: China 3 BA & 2 HO: Poland
May 1–4	(Azerbaijan) Baku	European Cup	Cross battle: (Italy) Sofia Raffaeli HO: (Ukraine) Taisiia Onofriichuk BA: (Italy) Sofia Raffaeli CL: (Ukraine) Taisiia Onofriichuk RI: (Ukraine) Taisiia Onofriichuk	Cross battle: Bulgaria 5 RI: Italy 3 BA & 2 HO: Azerbaijan
May 2–3	(Egypt) Cairo	African Championships	TF: Egypt AA: (Angola) Luana Gomes HO: (Egypt) Alia Ahmed BA: (Egypt) Alia Ahmed CL: (Egypt) Alia Ahmed RI: (Egypt) Alia Ahmed	
May 9–11	(Portugal) Portimão	FIG World Challenge Cup	AA: (Authorised Neutral Athletes) Alina Harnasko HO: (Authorised Neutral Athletes) Alina Harnasko BA: (Authorised Neutral Athletes) Alina Harnasko CL: (Authorised Neutral Athletes) Alina Harnasko RI: (Authorised Neutral Athletes) Alina Harnasko	AA: Brazil 5 RI: Brazil 3 BA & 2 HO: Brazil
May 15–18	(Bulgaria) Burgas	European Cup	Cross battle: (Israel) Meital Maayam Sumkin HO: (Israel) Meital Maayam Sumkin BA: (Bulgaria) Stiliana Nikolova CL: (Bulgaria) Stiliana Nikolova RI: (Bulgaria) Stiliana Nikolova	Cross battle: Hungary 5 RI: Israel 3 BA & 2 HO: Bulgaria
May 16–18	Singapore	Asian Championships	TF: Uzbekistan AA: (Uzbekistan) Takhmina Ikromova HO: (Uzbekistan) Takhmina Ikromova BA: (Uzbekistan) Anastasiya Sarantseva CL: (Uzbekistan) Takhmina Ikromova RI: (Kazakhstan) Aibota Yertaikyzy	AA: Kazakhstan 5 RI: Uzbekistan 3 BA & 2 HO: Kazakhstan
May 30 – June 1	(Paraguay) Asunción	Pan American Championships	TF: United States AA: (United States) Rin Keys HO: (United States) Megan Chu BA: (United States) Rin Keys CL: (United States) Rin Keys RI: (United States) Megan Chu	AA: Brazil 5 RI: Brazil 3 BA & 2 HO: Brazil
June 4–8	(Estonia) Tallinn	European Championships	TF: Italy AA: (Ukraine) Taisiia Onofriichuk HO: (Bulgaria) Stiliana Nikolova BA: (Bulgaria) Stiliana Nikolova CL: (Bulgaria) Stiliana Nikolova RI: (Germany) Darja Varfolomeev	AA: Spain 5 RI: Spain 3 BA & 2 HO: Spain
June 18–22	(Bulgaria) Sofia	Junior World Championships	TF: Bulgaria HO: (Bulgaria) Magdalena Valkova BA: (Kazakhstan) Akmaral Yerekesheva CL: (Kyrgyzstan) Zlata Arkatova RI: (Kazakhstan) Akmaral Yerekesheva	AA: Bulgaria 5 HO: Bulgaria 5 CL: Ukraine
July 16–27	(Germany) Rhine-Ruhr	World University Games	AA: (Individual Neutral Athletes) Alina Harnasko HO: (Uzbekistan) Takhmina Ikromova BA: (Germany) Margarita Kolosov CL: (Individual Neutral Athletes) Alina Harnasko RI: (Uzbekistan) Takhmina Ikromova	AA: Azerbaijan 5 RI: Azerbaijan 3 BA & 2 HO: Ukraine
July 18–20	(Italy) Milan	FIG World Cup	AA: (Italy) Sofia Raffaeli HO: (Italy) Sofia Raffaeli BA: (Germany) Darja Varfolomeev CL: (Bulgaria) Stiliana Nikolova RI: (Italy) Tara Dragas	AA: Brazil 5 RI: Italy 3 BA & 2 HO: China
July 25–27	(Romania) Cluj-Napoca	FIG World Challenge Cup	AA: (Germany) Darja Varfolomeev HO: (Israel) Meital Maayam Sumkin BA: (Germany) Darja Varfolomeev CL: (Ukraine) Taisiia Onofriichuk RI: (Ukraine) Taisiia Onofriichuk	AA: Spain 5 RI: Spain 3 BA & 2 HO: Spain
August 11–13	(Paraguay) Asunción	Junior Pan American Games	AA: (United States) Natalie de la Rosa HO: (United States) Natalie de la Rosa BA: (Mexico) Ana Luisa Abraham CL: (United States) Anna Filipp RI: (United States) Anna Filipp	AA: Mexico 5 HO: Brazil 5 CL: Mexico
August 20–24	(Brazil) Rio de Janeiro	World Championships	TF: Germany AA: (Germany) Darja Varfolomeev HO: (Italy) Sofia Raffaeli BA: (Germany) Darja Varfolomeev CL: (Germany) Darja Varfolomeev RI: (Germany) Darja Varfolomeev	AA: Japan 5 RI: China 3 BA & 2 HO: Ukraine
December 2–4	Peru	Bolivarian Games	TF: Colombia AA: (Colombia) Oriana Viñas HO: (Venezuela) Jimena Dominguez BA: (Venezuela) Jimena Dominguez CL: (Venezuela) Jimena Dominguez RI: (Venezuela) Jimena Dominguez	AA: Venezuela 5 RI: Venezuela 3 BA & 2 HO: Chile
December 9–20	Thailand	Southeast Asian Games	AA: (Philippines) Jasmine Ramilo	AA: Thailand

== Medalists ==
=== International events ===
Competition	Event	Gold	Silver	Bronze
World Championships	Individual All-Around	(Germany) Darja Varfolomeev	(Bulgaria) Stiliana Nikolova	(Italy) Sofia Raffaeli
World Championships	Hoop	(Italy) Sofia Raffaeli	(Bulgaria) Stiliana Nikolova	(Germany) Anastasia Simakova
World Championships	Ball	(Germany) Darja Varfolomeev	(United States) Rin Keys	(Italy) Sofia Raffaeli
World Championships	Clubs	(Germany) Darja Varfolomeev	(Romania) Amalia Lică	(Bulgaria) Stiliana Nikolova
World Championships	Ribbon	(Germany) Darja Varfolomeev	(Bulgaria) Stiliana Nikolova	(Ukraine) Taisiia Onofriichuk
World Championships	Group All-Around	Japan	Brazil	Spain
World Championships	5 Ribbon	China	Japan	Spain
World Championships	3 Balls + 2 Hoops	Ukraine	Brazil	China
Junior World Championships	Team	Bulgaria	United States	Uzbekistan
Junior World Championships	Hoop	Magdalena Valkova (BUL)	Akmaral Yerekesheva (KAZ)	Natalie de la Rosa (USA)
Junior World Championships	Ball	Akmaral Yerekesheva (KAZ)	Wang Qi (CHN)	Nita Jamagidze (GEO)
Junior World Championships	Clubs	Zlata Arkatova (KGZ)	Farida Bahnas (EGY) Kseniya Zhyzhych (POL)	Not awarded
Junior World Championships	Ribbon	Akmaral Yerekesheva (KAZ)	Lina Heleika (EGY)	Magdalena Valkova (BUL)
Junior World Championships	Group All-Around	Bulgaria	Brazil	Ukraine
Junior World Championships	5 Hoops	Bulgaria	Brazil	Estonia Italy
Junior World Championships	10 Clubs	Ukraine	Italy	Bulgaria

=== Regional championships ===
Competition	Event	Gold	Silver	Bronze
African	Team	Egypt	South Africa	Angola
African	All-Around	Luana Gomes (ANG)	Alia Ahmed (EGY)	Stephanie Dimitrova (RSA)
African	Hoop	Alia Ahmed (EGY)	Stephanie Dimitrova (RSA)	Farida Mansy (EGY)
African	Ball	Alia Ahmed (EGY)	Luana Gomes (ANG)	Stephanie Dimitrova (RSA)
African	Clubs	Alia Ahmed (EGY)	Luana Gomes (ANG)	Stephanie Dimitrova (RSA)
African	Ribbon	Alia Ahmed (EGY)	Luana Gomes (ANG)	Ledia Behairy (EGY)
Asian	Team	Uzbekistan	Kazakhstan	Japan
Asian	Individual All-Around	(Uzbekistan) Takhmina Ikromova	(Uzbekistan) Anastasiya Sarantseva	(Kazakhstan) Aibota Yertaikyzy
Asian	Hoop	(Uzbekistan) Takhmina Ikromova	(Japan) Mirano Kita	(Uzbekistan) Anastasiya Sarantseva
Asian	Ball	(Uzbekistan) Anastasiya Sarantseva	(Japan) Reina Matsusaka	(Uzbekistan) Takhmina Ikromova
Asian	Clubs	(Uzbekistan) Takhmina Ikromova	(Japan) Reina Matsusaka	(Kazakhstan) Aiym Meirzhanova
Asian	Ribbon	(Kazakhstan) Aibota Yertaikyzy	(Uzbekistan) Nataliya Usova	(Japan) Reina Matsusaka
Asian	Groups All-Around	Kazakhstan	Republic of Korea	Uzbekistan
Asian	5 Ribbons	Uzbekistan	Kazakhstan	Republic of Korea
Asian	3 Balls + 2 Hoops	Kazakhstan	Uzbekistan	Republic of Korea
European	Team	Italy	Ukraine	Israel
European	All-Around	(Ukraine) Taisiia Onofriichuk	(Bulgaria) Stiliana Nikolova	(Germany) Darja Varfolomeev
European	Hoop	(Bulgaria) Stiliana Nikolova	(Italy) Sofia Raffaeli	(Ukraine) Taisiia Onofriichuk
European	Ball	(Bulgaria) Stiliana Nikolova	(Germany) Anastasia Simakova	(Israel) Meital Maayam Sumkin
European	Clubs	(Bulgaria) Stiliana Nikolova	(Ukraine) Taisiia Onofriichuk	(Italy) Sofia Raffaeli
European	Ribbon	(Germany) Darja Varfolomeev	(Israel) Meital Maayam Sumkin	(Ukraine) Taisiia Onofriichuk
European	Group All-Around	Spain	Israel	Hungary
European	5 Ribbons	Spain	France	Italy
European	3 Balls + 2 Hoops	Spain	Ukraine	Germany
Oceania	All-Around	(Australia) Miyabi Akiya	(New Zealand) Havana Hopman	(Australia) Polina Leonova
Pan American	Team	United States	Brazil	Canada
Pan American	All-Around	(United States) Rin Keys	(Brazil) Barbara Domingos	(Brazil) Geovanna Santos
Pan American	Hoop	(United States) Megan Chu	(Brazil) Geovanna Santos	(Brazil) Barbara Domingos
Pan American	Ball	(United States) Rin Keys	(Brazil) Barbara Domingos	(United States) Megan Chu
Pan American	Clubs	(United States) Rin Keys	(Brazil) Barbara Domingos	(Brazil) Geovanna Santos
Pan American	Ribbon	(United States) Megan Chu	(United States) Rin Keys	(Brazil) Barbara Domingos
Pan American	Group All-Around	Brazil	Canada	United States
Pan American	5 Ribbons	Brazil	Mexico	United States
Pan American	3 Balls + 2 Hoops	Brazil	United States	Mexico

== Season's best international scores ==
Note: Only the scores of senior gymnasts from international events have been included below. Only one score per gymnast is included.

=== Individuals ===
==== All-Around ====
Rank	Name	Country	Score	Event
1	Taisiia Onofriichuk	Ukraine	116.250	Marbella Grand Prix AA
2	Stiliana Nikolova	Bulgaria	115.950	Sofia International Tournament AA
3	Sofia Raffaeli	Italy	115.300	Marbella Grand Prix AA
4	Alina Harnasko	Authorised Neutral Athletes	115.250	Portimão World Cup AA
5	Anastasia Simakova	Germany	113.700	Gymnastik International AA
6	Dara Stoyanova	Bulgaria	112.950	Sofia International Tournament AA
7	Eva Brezalieva	Bulgaria	112.450	Sofia International Tournament AA
8	Darja Varfolomeev	Germany	112.250	Tashkent World Cup
8	Takhmina Ikromova	Uzbekistan	112.250	Tashkent World Cup
10	Liliana Lewisnska	Poland	112.100	Marbella Grand Prix AA
11	Rin Keys	United States	110.550	Portimão World Cup AA
12	Tara Dragas	Italy	110.050	European Cup Baku AA
12	Lola Djuraeva	Uzbekistan	110.050	European Cup Baku Cross Battle
14	Anastasiia Salos	Authorised Neutral Athletes	109.350	Marbella Grand Prix AA

==== Hoop ====
Rank	Name	Country	Score	Event
1	Taisiia Onofriichuk	Ukraine	30.750	Miss Valentine Grand Prix EF
2	Sofia Raffaeli	Italy	30.650	Marbella Grand Prix EF
3	Stiliana Nikolova	Bulgaria	30.300	European Championships EF
4	Darja Varfolomeev	Germany	30.000	European Championships QF
5	Meital Maayam Sumkin	Israel	29.750	European Championships EF
6	Eva Brezalieva	Bulgaria	29.600	Sofia International Tournament EF
7	Alina Harnasko	Authorised Neutral Athletes	29.500	Portimão World Cup EF
8	Anastasiia Salos	Authorised Neutral Athletes	29.250	Portimão World Cup EF
