= Egypt at the 2024 Summer Olympics =

- IOC code: EGY
- NOC: Egyptian Olympic Committee
- Website: www.egyptianolympic.org (in Arabic and English)

in Paris, France 26 July 2024 – 11 August 2024
- Competitors: 148 (97 men and 52 women) in 24 sports
- Flag bearers (opening): Ahmed El-Gendy & Sara Ahmed
- Flag bearers (closing): Ahmed El-Gendy & Sara Ahmed
- Medals Ranked 52nd: Gold 1 Silver 1 Bronze 1 Total 3

Summer Olympics appearances (overview)
- 1912; 1920; 1924; 1928; 1932; 1936; 1948; 1952; 1956; 1960–1964; 1968; 1972; 1976; 1980; 1984; 1988; 1992; 1996; 2000; 2004; 2008; 2012; 2016; 2020; 2024; 2028

Other related appearances
- 1906 Intercalated Games –––– United Arab Republic (1960, 1964)

Egypt competed at the 2024 Summer Olympics in Paris from 26 July to 11 August 2024. Egyptian athletes won three medals at this edition of the Olympic. Since the nation's debut in 1912, Egyptian athletes have appeared in every edition of the Summer Olympic Games except for two occasions: the 1932 Summer Olympics in Los Angeles because of the worldwide Great Depression and the 1980 Summer Olympics in Moscow, as part of the United States-led boycott.

== Medalists ==
The following Egyptian athletes won medals at the Games. In the discipline sections below, medalists' names are bolded.

Medal	Name	Sport	Event	Date
Gold	Ahmed El-Gendy	Modern pentathlon	Men's individual	10 August
Silver	Sara Ahmed	Weightlifting	Women's 81 kg	10 August
Bronze	Mohamed El-Sayed	Fencing	Men's épée	28 July

**Medals by sport**
**Sport**	1st place, gold medalist(s)	2nd place, silver medalist(s)	3rd place, bronze medalist(s)	**Total**
Fencing	0	0	1	**1**
Modern Pentathlon	1	0	0	**1**
Weightlifting	0	1	0	**1**
**Total**	**1**	**1**	**1**	**3**

Medals by gender
Gender	1st place, gold medalist(s)	2nd place, silver medalist(s)	3rd place, bronze medalist(s)	Total
Male	1	0	1	**2**
Female	0	1	0	**1**
Mixed	0	0	0	**0**
Total	1	1	1	3

Medals by date
**Date**	1st place, gold medalist(s)	2nd place, silver medalist(s)	3rd place, bronze medalist(s)	**Total**
28 July	0	0	1	**1**
10 August	1	1	0	**2**
**Total**	**1**	**1**	**1**	3

== Competitors ==
The following is the list of number of Egyptian competitors in the Games. Note that reserves in football are not counted:

Sport	Men	Women	Total
Archery	1	1	2
Artistic swimming	0	8	8
Athletics	5	1	6
Boxing	2	1	3
Canoeing	0	1	1
Cycling	1	2	3
Diving	2	2	4
Equestrian	1	0	1
Fencing	9	8	17
Football	18	0	18
Gymnastics	1	8	9
Handball	14	0	14
Judo	2	0	2
Modern pentathlon	2	2	4
Rowing	3	0	3
Sailing	1	1	2
Shooting	5	6	11
Swimming	1	1	2
Table tennis	3	3	6
Taekwondo	2	1	3
Tennis	0	1	1
Volleyball	12	2	14
Weightlifting	2	3	5
Wrestling	10	1	11
Total	97	52	149

== Archery ==
Two Egyptian archers qualified for the 2024 Summer Olympics men's and women's individual recurve competitions by virtue of their results at the 2023 African Continental Qualification Tournament in Nabeul, Tunisia.

Athlete	Event	Ranking round		Round of 64	Round of 32	Round of 16	Quarterfinals	Semifinals	Final / BM	
Athlete	Event	Score	Seed	Opposition Score	Opposition Score	Opposition Score	Opposition Score	Opposition Score	Opposition Score	Rank
Youssof Tolba	Men's individual	624	62	Unruh (GER); **L** 0–6	Did not advance					
Jana Ali	Women's individual	573	63	Nam S-h (KOR); **L** 1–7	Did not advance					
Youssof Tolba; Jana Ali	Mixed team	1197	27	—N/a		Did not advance				27

== Artistic swimming ==
Egypt fielded a squad of eight artistic swimmers to compete in the women's duet and mixed team event as the highest-ranked African nation eligible for qualification at the 2023 FINA World Championships in Fukuoka, Japan.

Athlete	Event	Technical routine		Free routine			Acrobatic routine		
Athlete	Event	Points	Rank	Points	Total (technical + free)	Rank	Points	Total (technical + free + acrobatic)	Rank
Nadine Barsoum; Hanna Hiekal	Duet	196.5250	16	225.6541	422.1791	15	—N/a		
Farida Abdelbary; Mariam Ahmed; Nadine Barsoum; Amina Elfeky; Hanna Hiekal; Salma Marei; Sondos Mohamed; Nihal Saafan	Team	242.7651	9	243.9896	486.7547	10	219.2267	705.9814	10

== Athletics ==
Egyptian track and field athletes achieved the entry standards for Paris 2024 by world ranking in the following events (a maximum of 3 athletes each):

Key

- Note–Ranks given for track events are within the athlete's heat only
- **Q** = Qualified for the next round
- **q** = Qualified for the next round as the fastest loser or, in field events, by position without achieving the qualifying target
- **NR** = National record
- N/A = Round not applicable for the event
- Bye = Athlete not required to compete in round

Field events

Athlete	Event	Qualification		Final	
Athlete	Event	Result	Rank	Result	Rank
Mohamed Khalifa	Men's shot put	19.27	25	Did not advance	
Mostafa Amr Hassan	Men's shot put	19.70	20	Did not advance	
Mostafa Elgamel	Men's hammer throw	70.09	30	Did not advance	
Ihab Abdelrahman	Men's javelin throw	72.98	30	Did not advance	
Moustafa Mahmoud	Men's javelin throw	74.87	29	Did not advance	
Esraa Owis	Women's long jump	6.20	29	Did not advance	

== Boxing ==
Egypt entered three boxers into the Olympic tournament. Yomna Ayyad secured her spots in the women's bantamweight division by advancing to the final match, while Omar Elawady (men's welterweight) and Abdelrahman Oraby (men's middleweight) secured a spot in their respective events, through the 2023 African Olympic Qualification Tournament in Dakar, Senegal.

Athlete	Event	Round of 32	Round of 16	Quarterfinals	Semifinals	Final	
Athlete	Event	Opposition Result	Opposition Result	Opposition Result	Opposition Result	Opposition Result	Rank
Omar Elawady	Men's 71 kg	Bye	Muydinkhujaev (UZB); **L** 0–5	Did not advance			
Abdelrahman Oraby	Men's 80 kg	Bye	Allahverdiyev (AZE); **L** 0–5	Did not advance			
Yomna Ayyad	Women's 54 kg	Uktamova (UZB); **L** w/o	Did not advance				

== Canoeing ==
=== Sprint ===
Egyptian female canoeists qualified one boat for the Games by being the highest-ranking eligible nation in the K-1 500 metres event at the 2023 African Olympics in Abuja, Nigeria.

Athlete	Event	Heats		Quarterfinals		Semifinals		Final	
Athlete	Event	Time	Rank	Time	Rank	Time	Rank	Time	Rank
Samaa Ahmed	Women's K-1 500 m	2:18.52	7 **QF**	2:14.39	7	Did not advance			

Qualification Legend: FA = Qualify to final (medal); FB = Qualify to final B (non-medal)

== Cycling ==
=== Track ===
Egypt entered one men's rider and two women's riders to compete in the following events, based on the nation's performances, through the final UCI Olympic rankings.

Sprint

Saeed did not compete.

Athlete	Event	Qualification		Round 1	Repechage 1	Round 2	Repechage 2	Round 3	Repechage 3	Quarterfinals	Semifinals	Finals / BM	
Athlete	Event	Time Speed (km/h)	Rank	Opposition Time Speed (km/h)	Opposition Time Speed (km/h)	Opposition Time Speed (km/h)	Opposition Time Speed (km/h)	Opposition Time Speed (km/h)	Opposition Time Speed (km/h)	Opposition Time Speed (km/h)	Opposition Time Speed (km/h)	Opposition Time Speed (km/h)	Rank
Shahd Saeed	Women's sprint	DNS											

Keirin

Athlete	Event	Round 1	Repechage	Quarterfinals	Semifinals	Final
Athlete	Event	Rank	Rank	Rank	Rank	Rank
Shahd Saaed	Women's keirin	DNS				

Omnium

Athlete	Event	Scratch race		Tempo race		Elimination race		Points race		Total	
Athlete	Event	Rank	Points	Rank	Points	Rank	Points	Rank	Points	Rank	Points
Youssef Abouelhassan	Men's omnium	22	-39	22	1	15	12	DNF	-40	22	-66
Ebtissam Mohamed	Women's omnium	11	20	21	1	14	14	21	35	21	15

== Diving ==
Egyptian divers secured four quota places for Paris 2024 by winning the gold medal in all of the individual events through the 2023 African Diving Qualifier in Durban, South Africa.

Athlete	Event	Preliminary		Semifinal		Final	
Athlete	Event	Points	Rank	Points	Rank	Points	Rank
Mohamed Farouk	Men's 3 m springboard	317.40	23	Did not advance			
Ramez Sobhy	Men's 10 m platform	266.95	26	Did not advance			
Maha Amer	Women's 3 m springboard	250.20	24	Did not advance			
Malak Tawfik	Women's 10 m platform	193.75	28	Did not advance			

== Equestrian ==
Egypt entered one rider in the individual jumping event through the establishment of final Olympics ranking for Group F (Africa & Middle East).

=== Jumping ===
Athlete	Horse	Event	Qualification		Final		
Athlete	Horse	Event	Penalties	Rank	Penalties	Time	Rank
Nayel Nasser	Coronado	Individual	DNS				

== Fencing ==
Egypt entered a full squad of male fencers and nine female fencers into the Olympic competition. Nada Hafez secured her quota places in the women's individual sabre after being nominated as the highest-ranked individual fencers eligible for the African zone; meanwhile, all of the men's team, women's épée, and foil events qualified for the games after becoming the highest-ranked African team through the release of the FIE Official ranking for Paris 2024.

Men

Athlete	Event	Round of 64	Round of 32	Round of 16	Quarterfinal	Semifinal	Final / BM	
Athlete	Event	Opposition Score	Opposition Score	Opposition Score	Opposition Score	Opposition Score	Opposition Score	Rank
**Mohamed El-Sayed**	Épée	Bye	Rodríguez (COL); **W** 15–7	Santarelli (ITA); **W** 15–10	Loyola (BEL); **W** 9–8	Borel (FRA); **L** 9–15	Andrásfi (HUN); **W** 8–7	3rd place, bronze medalist(s)
Mohammed Yasseen	Épée	Bye	Minobe (JPN); **L** 8–9	Did not advance				22
Mahmoud Mohsen	Épée	Jurka (CZE); **L** 8–15	Did not advance					33
Mohammed Yasseen; Mohamed El-Sayed; Mahmoud Mohsen; Mahmoud El-Sayed	Team épée	—N/a			France; **L** 39–45	Classification Semifinal Kazakhstan; **L** 21–34	Seventh place final Venezuela; **L** 35–41	8
Alaaeldin Abouelkassem	Foil	Bye	Iimura (JPN); **L** 8–15	Did not advance				24
Mohamed Hamza	Foil	Bye	Jurkiewicz (POL); **W** 15–14	Llavador (ESP); **W** 15–12	Macchi (ITA); **L** 9–15	Did not advance		5
Abdelrahman Tolba	Foil	Bye	Dósa (HUN); **W** 15–14	Itkin (USA); **L** 8–15	Did not advance			16
Alaaeldin Abouelkassem; Mohamed Hamza; Abdelrahman Tolba	Team foil	—N/a			United States; **L** 35–45	Classification Semifinal Poland; **L** 36–45	Seventh place final Canada; **L** 38–45	8
Ziad El-Sissy	Sabre	Bye	di Tella (ARG); **W** 15–11	Saron (USA); **W** 15–13	Szabo (GER); **W** 15–14	Ferjani (TUN); **L** 11–15	Samele (ITA); **L** 12–15	4
Adham Moataz	Sabre	Bye	Amer (EGY); **L** 8–15	Did not advance				22
Mohamed Amer	Sabre	Bye	Moataz (EGY); **W** 15–8	Bazadze (GEO); **W** 15–14	Samele (ITA); **L** 13–15	Did not advance		6
Ziad El-Sissy; Adham Moataz; Mohamed Amer Yassin Khodir	Team sabre	—N/a			France; **L** 41–45	Classification Semifinal; Canada; **W** 45–41	Fifth place final Italy; **L** 38–45	6

Women

Athlete	Event	Round of 64	Round of 32	Round of 16	Quarterfinal	Semifinal	Final / BM	
Athlete	Event	Opposition Score	Opposition Score	Opposition Score	Opposition Score	Opposition Score	Opposition Score	Rank
Nardin Ehab	Épée	Gaber (EGY); **W** 15–9	Candassamy (FRA); **L** 10–15	Did not advance				31
Aya Hussein	Épée	Diongue (SEN); **W** 15–14	Kong (HKG); **L** 11–15	Did not advance				30
Shirwit Gaber	Épée	Ehab (EGY); **L** 9–15	Did not advance					34
Nardin Ehab; Aya Hussein; Shirwit Gaber	Team épée	—N/a			Italy; **L** 26–39	Classification Semifinal; Ukraine; **L** 31–45	Seventh place final United States; **L** 30–44	8
Yara El-Sharkawy	Foil	Bye	Qianqian (CHN); **L** 5–15	Did not advance				21
Sara Amr Hossny	Foil	Bye	Favaretto (ITA); **L** 5–15	Did not advance				29
Malak Hamza	Foil	Bye	Sauer (GER); **L** 3–15	Did not advance				27
Yara El-Sharkawy; Sara Amr Hossny; Malak Hamza	Team foil	—N/a			Italy; **L** 14–45	Classification Semifinal Poland; **L** 21–45	Seventh place final China; **L** 18–45	8
Nada Hafez	Sabre	Bye	Tartakovsky (USA); **W** 15–13	Jeon (KOR); **L** 7–15	Did not advance			16

== Football ==
Summary

Key:

- A.E.T – After extra time.
- P – Match decided by penalty-shootout.

Team	Event	Group Stage				Quarterfinal	Semifinal	Final / BM	
Team	Event	Opposition Score	Opposition Score	Opposition Score	Rank	Opposition Score	Opposition Score	Opposition Score	Rank
Egypt men's	Men's tournament	Dominican Republic; **D** 0–0	Uzbekistan; **W** 1–0	Spain; **W** 2–1	1 **Q**	Paraguay; **W** 1–1 (5–4)	France; **L** 1–3 (a.e.t)	Third place match Morocco; **L** 0–6	4

=== Men's tournament ===
Egypt men's football team qualified for the Olympics by advancing to the final match of the 2023 U-23 Africa Cup of Nations in Rabat, Morocco.

Team roster

Egypt announced their initial 22-men squad on 4 July 2024.

Head coach: (Brazil) Rogério Micale

No.	Pos.	Player	Date of birth (age)	Club
1	GK	Hamza Alaa	1 March 2001 (aged 23)	(Egyptian Football Association) Al-Ahly
2	DF	Omar Fayed	4 July 2003 (aged 21)	(Football Association of Serbia) Novi Pazar
3	MF	Ahmed Atef	19 December 2002 (aged 21)	(Egyptian Football Association) ZED FC
4	DF	Ahmed Eid	1 January 2001 (aged 23)	(Egyptian Football Association) Al-Masry
5	DF	**Hossam Abdelmaguid**	30 April 2001 (aged 23)	(Egyptian Football Association) Zamalek
6	MF	Mohamed Shehata	8 February 2001 (aged 23)	(Egyptian Football Association) Zamalek
7	MF	Mahmoud Saber	30 July 2001 (aged 22)	(Egyptian Football Association) Pyramids
8	MF	Ziad Kamal	1 January 2001 (aged 23)	(Egyptian Football Association) Zamalek
9	FW	**Osama Faisal**	1 January 2001 (aged 23)	(Egyptian Football Association) National Bank of Egypt
10	MF	**Ibrahim Adel**	23 April 2001 (aged 23)	(Egyptian Football Association) Pyramids
11	MF	Mostafa Saad	22 August 2001 (aged 22)	(Egyptian Football Association) ZED FC
12	MF	**Ahmed Koka**	4 July 2001 (aged 23)	(Egyptian Football Association) Al-Ahly
13	DF	Karim El Debes	3 June 2003 (aged 21)	(Egyptian Football Association) Al-Ahly
14	MF	**Ahmed Sayed***	10 January 1996 (aged 28)	(Egyptian Football Association) Zamalek
15	DF	Mohamed Tarek	20 April 2002 (aged 22)	(Egyptian Football Association) Al-Masry
16	GK	Ali El Gabry	14 February 2001 (aged 23)	(Egyptian Football Association) Ceramica Cleopatra
17	MF	**Mohamed Elneny*** (captain)	11 July 1992 (aged 32)	(The Football Association) Arsenal
18	FW	Bilal Mazhar	21 November 2003 (aged 20)	(Hellenic Football Federation) Panathinaikos
19	MF	Mohamed Hamdy	26 February 2003 (aged 21)	(Egyptian Football Association) ENPPI

* Overage player.

Group play

Pos	Team	Pld	W	D	L	GF	GA	GD	Pts	Qualification
1	Egypt	3	2	1	0	3	1	+2	**7**	Advance to knockout stage
2	Spain	3	2	0	1	6	4	+2	**6**	Advance to knockout stage
3	Dominican Republic	3	0	2	1	2	4	−2	**2**	
4	Uzbekistan	3	0	1	2	2	4	−2	**1**	

Source: FIFA
Rules for classification: Group stage tiebreakers
24 July 2024
17:00

Egypt	0–0	Dominican Republic
	Report

Stade de la Beaujoire, Nantes
Attendance: 13,945
Referee: Yoshimi Yamashita (Japan)

27 July 2024
17:00

Uzbekistan	0–1	Egypt
	Report	Koka 11'

Stade de la Beaujoire, Nantes
Attendance: 20,658
Referee: Campbell-Kirk Kawana-Waugh (New Zealand)

30 July 2024
15:00

Spain	1–2	Egypt
Aghehowa 90'	Report	Adel 40', 62'

Stade de Bordeaux, Bordeaux
Attendance: 12,180
Referee: Drew Fischer (Canada)

Quarterfinal

2 August 2024
19:00

Egypt	1–1 (a.e.t.)	Paraguay
Adel 88'	Report	D. Gómez 71'
Penalties
Koka (penalty scored); Elneny (penalty scored); El Debes (penalty scored); Abdelmaguid (penalty scored); Adel (penalty scored)	5–4	(penalty scored) D. Gómez; (penalty missed) Pérez; (penalty scored) Viera; (penalty scored) M. Gómez; (penalty scored) Balbuena

Stade de Marseille, Marseille
Attendance: 23,753
Referee: Glenn Nyberg (Sweden)

Semifinal

5 August 2024
21:00

France	3–1 (a.e.t.)	Egypt
Mateta 83', 99'; Olise 108'	Report	Saber 62'

Stade de Lyon, Décines-Charpieu
Attendance: 47,530
Referee: Saíd Martínez (Honduras)

Bronze medal match

8 August 2024
17:00

Egypt	0–6	Morocco
	Report	Ezzalzouli 23'; Rahimi 26', 64'; El Khannouss 51'; Nakach 73'; Hakimi 87'

Stade de la Beaujoire, Nantes
Attendance: 27,391
Referee: Espen Eskås (Norway)

== Gymnastics ==
=== Artistic ===
Egypt entered two gymnasts into the games. Omar Mohamed and Jana Mahmoud secured their spot directly for the games, in their respective events, by being the highest-ranked eligible athletes in the all-around at the 2024 African Championships in Marrakesh, Morocco.

Men

Athlete	Event	Qualification								Final							
Athlete	Event	Apparatus						Total	Rank	Apparatus						Total	Rank
Athlete	Event	F	PH	R	V	PB	HB	Total	Rank	F	PH	R	V	PB	HB	Total	Rank
Omar Mohamed	All-around	12.466	13.066	13.600	12.700	14.133	12.700	78.665	40	Did not advance							

Women

Athlete	Event	Qualification						Final					
Athlete	Event	Apparatus				Total	Rank	Apparatus				Total	Rank
Athlete	Event	V	UB	BB	F	Total	Rank	V	UB	BB	F	Total	Rank
Jana Mahmoud	All-around	11.866	11.066	11.400	12.366	46.698	58	Did not advance					

=== Rhythmic ===
Egypt entered a full squad of rhythmic gymnast into the games by virtue of winning the gold medal, at the 2024 African Championships in Kigali, Rwanda.

Athlete	Event	Qualification						Final					
Athlete	Event	Hoop	Ball	Clubs	Ribbon	Total	Rank	Hoop	Ball	Clubs	Ribbon	Total	Rank
Aliaa Saleh	Individual	28.700	28.150	27.850	27.000	111.700	23	Did not advance					

Athletes	Event	Qualification				Final			
Athletes	Event	5 apps	3+2 apps	Total	Rank	5 apps.	3+2 apps	Total	Rank
Lamar Behairi; Johara Eldeeb; Farida Hussein; Abeer Ramadan; Amina Sobeih	Group	30.850	25.050	55.900	14	Did not advance			

=== Trampoline ===
Egypt qualified one gymnast by winning the gold medal in the women's trampoline event at the 2024 African Championships in Bizerte, Tunisia.

Athlete	Event	Qualification		Final	
Athlete	Event	Score	Rank	Score	Rank
Malak Hamza	Women's	9.650	16	Did not advance	

== Handball ==
Summary

Key:

- ET: After extra time
- P – Match decided by penalty-shootout.

Team	Event	Group Stage						Quarterfinal	Semifinal	Final / BM	
Team	Event	Opposition Score	Opposition Score	Opposition Score	Opposition Score	Opposition Score	Rank	Opposition Score	Opposition Score	Opposition Score	Rank
Egypt	Men's tournament	Hungary; **W** 35–32	Denmark; **L** 27–30	France; **D** 26–26	Norway; **W** 26–25	Argentina; **W** 34–27	2 **Q**	Spain; **L** 28–29^{ET}	Did not advance		5

=== Men's tournament ===
Egypt men's national handball team qualified for the Olympics by winning the gold medal at the 2024 African Men's Handball Championship.

Team roster

A 20-player roster was announced on 13 June 2024. The final squad was revealed on 15 July 2024.

Head coach: (Spain) Juan Carlos Pastor

No.	Pos.	Name	Date of birth (age)	Height	App.	Goals	Club
5	RB	Yahia Omar	9 September 1997 (aged 26)	1.95 m	62	221	(France) Paris Saint-Germain
10	LB	Abdelrahman Abdou	30 January 1996 (aged 28)	1.96 m	15	25	(Egypt) Al Ahly
15	LB	Ahmed Hesham	15 May 2000 (aged 24)	1.91 m	58	77	(France) Montpellier Handball
21	P	Mohamed Tarek	15 January 2002 (aged 22)	2.02 m	0	0	(Egypt) Zamalek
24	P	Ibrahim El-Masry	11 March 1989 (aged 35)	1.96 m	62	81	(Egypt) Al Ahly
31	LW	Omar El-Wakil	14 May 1988 (aged 36)	1.74 m	224	302	(Egypt) Zamalek
39	CB	Yehia El-Deraa	17 July 1995 (aged 29)	1.92 m	162	319	(Hungary) Telekom Veszprém
45	CB	Seif El-Deraa	19 September 1998 (aged 25)	1.87 m	58	93	(France) Limoges Handball
48	RW	Mohab Abdelhak	20 January 2003 (aged 21)	1.94 m	35	65	(France) USAM Nîmes Gard
53	RW	Akram Yosri	22 November 1994 (aged 29)	1.80 m	53	147	(Egypt) Zamalek
80	P	Ahmed Adel	25 November 1994 (aged 29)	1.84 m	27	24	(Egypt) Al Ahly
88	GK	Karim Handawy	1 May 1988 (aged 36)	1.88 m	175	2	(Saudi Arabia) Al Safa
90	LB	Ali Zein	14 December 1990 (aged 33)	1.91 m	310	464	(Romania) Dinamo București
91	RW	Mohamed Sanad	16 January 1991 (aged 33)	1.88 m	171	418	(France) USAM Nîmes Gard
92	GK	Mohamed Aly	13 November 1992 (aged 31)	1.90 m	15	0	(Portugal) Benfica

Group play

Pos	Team	Pld	W	D	L	GF	GA	GD	Pts	Qualification
1	Denmark	5	5	0	0	165	133	+32	10	Quarterfinals
2	Egypt	5	3	1	1	148	140	+8	7	Quarterfinals
3	Norway	5	3	0	2	139	136	+3	6	Quarterfinals
4	France (H)	5	2	1	2	129	131	−2	5	Quarterfinals
5	Hungary	5	1	0	4	137	138	−1	2	
6	Argentina	5	0	0	5	131	171	−40	0	

Source: Olympics Paris 2024 rankings
Rules for classification: 1) Points; 2) Head-to-head points; 3) Head-to-head goal difference; 4) Head-to-head goals scored; 5) Goal difference; 6) Goals scored; 7) Draw.
(H) Hosts

27 July 2024; 11:00	**Hungary**	**32–35**	**Egypt**	Paris Expo Porte de Versailles, Paris; Attendance: 5,776; Referees: Nachevski, Nikolov (MKD)
27 July 2024; 11:00	Imre 7	(15–19)	Adel, Omar 9	Paris Expo Porte de Versailles, Paris; Attendance: 5,776; Referees: Nachevski, Nikolov (MKD)
27 July 2024; 11:00	4× (suspension)	Report	1× (yellow card) 2× (suspension)	Paris Expo Porte de Versailles, Paris; Attendance: 5,776; Referees: Nachevski, Nikolov (MKD)

29 July 2024; 14:00	**Egypt**	**27–30**	**Denmark**	Paris Expo Porte de Versailles, Paris; Attendance: 5,764; Referees: Lah, Sok (SLO)
29 July 2024; 14:00	three players 5	(9–19)	Arnoldsen, Gidsel 8	Paris Expo Porte de Versailles, Paris; Attendance: 5,764; Referees: Lah, Sok (SLO)
29 July 2024; 14:00	1× (yellow card) 3× (suspension)	Report	1× (yellow card) 3× (suspension)	Paris Expo Porte de Versailles, Paris; Attendance: 5,764; Referees: Lah, Sok (SLO)

31 July 2024; 19:00	**France**	**26–26**	**Egypt**	Paris Expo Porte de Versailles, Paris; Attendance: 5,780; Referees: Kurtagic, Wetterwik (SWE)
31 July 2024; 19:00	Fabregas 5	(11–15)	Omar 8	Paris Expo Porte de Versailles, Paris; Attendance: 5,780; Referees: Kurtagic, Wetterwik (SWE)
31 July 2024; 19:00	3× (suspension)	Report	2× (suspension)	Paris Expo Porte de Versailles, Paris; Attendance: 5,780; Referees: Kurtagic, Wetterwik (SWE)

2 August 2024; 21:00	**Norway**	**25–26**	**Egypt**	Paris Expo Porte de Versailles, Paris; Attendance: 5,652; Referees: Schulze, Tönnies (GER)
2 August 2024; 21:00	Reinkind 7	(13–14)	Omar 7	Paris Expo Porte de Versailles, Paris; Attendance: 5,652; Referees: Schulze, Tönnies (GER)
2 August 2024; 21:00	2× (suspension) 1× (red card)	Report	2× (suspension)	Paris Expo Porte de Versailles, Paris; Attendance: 5,652; Referees: Schulze, Tönnies (GER)

4 August 2024; 11:00	**Egypt**	**34–27**	**Argentina**	Paris Expo Porte de Versailles, Paris; Attendance: 5,808; Referees: Bíró, Kiss (HUN)
4 August 2024; 11:00	S. El-Deraa, Zein 6	(14–15)	F. Pizarro 6	Paris Expo Porte de Versailles, Paris; Attendance: 5,808; Referees: Bíró, Kiss (HUN)
4 August 2024; 11:00	4× (suspension)	Report	1× (suspension)	Paris Expo Porte de Versailles, Paris; Attendance: 5,808; Referees: Bíró, Kiss (HUN)

Quarterfinal

7 August 2024
09:30
Spain
**29–28** **(ET)**
Egypt
Stade Pierre-Mauroy, Lille
Attendance: 25,697
Referees: Horáček, Novotný (CZE)
Gómez 9
(8–12)
Y. El-Deraa 8
2× (suspension)
Report
5× (suspension)

FT: 25–25 ET: 4–3

== Judo ==
Egypt qualified two judokas for the following weight classes at the Games. Youssry Samy (men's extra-lightweight, 60 kg) and Abdelrahman Abdelghany (men's half-middleweight, 81 kg) qualified via quota based on the IJF World Ranking List and continental quota based on the Olympic point rankings.

Athlete	Event	Round of 64	Round of 32	Round of 16	Quarterfinals	Semifinals	Repechage	Final / BM	
Athlete	Event	Opposition Result	Opposition Result	Opposition Result	Opposition Result	Opposition Result	Opposition Result	Opposition Result	Rank
Youssry Samy	Men's –60 kg	—N/a	Enkhtaivany (MGL); **L** 00–10	Did not advance					
Abdelrahman Abdelghany	Men's –81 kg	Djalo (FRA); **L** 00–01	Did not advance						

== Modern pentathlon ==
Egyptian modern pentathletes confirmed four quota places for Paris 2024. Mohanad Shaban secured an outright berth in the men's event by winning the gold medal in a dramatic sprint to the finish line at the 2023 UIPM World Cup Final in Ankara, Turkey; Ahmed El-Gendy and Malak Ismail secured an outright berth in their respective gender events by winning the 2023 Africa & Oceania Championships in Cairo; and Salma Abdelmaksoud qualified through the final Olympic ranking.

Athlete	Event		Fencing (épée one touch)				Riding (show jumping)			Swimming (200 m freestyle)			Combined: shooting/running (10 m laser pistol)/(3000 m)			Total points	Final rank
Athlete	Event		RR	BR	Rank	MP points	Penalties	Rank	MP points	Time	Rank	MP points	Time	Rank	MP points	Total points	Final rank
Mohanad Shaban	Men's	Semifinal	20–15	0	8	225	14	10	286	2:04.72	12	301	10:15.82	6	685	1497	9 **Q**
Mohanad Shaban	Men's	Final	20–15	2	8	227	EL		0	2:05.35	14	300	10:46.68	17	654	1181	18
**Ahmed El-Gendy**	Men's	Semifinal	24–11	0	1	245	33	17	267	1:59.76	4	311	10:07.61	6	693	1516 **OR**	1 **Q**
**Ahmed El-Gendy**	Men's	Final	24–11	0	1	245	0	6	300	1:59.30	6	312	10:02.47	11	698	1555 **WR**	1st place, gold medalist(s)
Malak Ismail	Women's	Semifinal	17–18	6	7	216	14	13	286	2:15.70	7	279	11:30.82	6	610	1391	8 **Q**
Malak Ismail	Women's	Final	17–18	2	9	212	7	10	293	2:16.94	9	277	11:27.35	11	613	1395	12
Salma Abdelmaksoud	Women's	Semifinal	16–19	0	15	205	EL		0	2:13.55	5	283	11:44.31	9	596	1084	17
Salma Abdelmaksoud	Women's	Final	16–19	Did not advance													

== Rowing ==
Egyptian rowers qualified two boats, each in the men's lightweight double sculls and single sculls for the Games through the 2023 African Qualification Regatta in Tunis, Tunisia.

Athlete	Event	Heats		Repechage		Quarterfinals		Semifinals		Final	
Athlete	Event	Time	Rank	Time	Rank	Time	Rank	Time	Rank	Time	Rank
Abdelkhalek El-Banna	Men's single sculls	7:05.06	3 **QF**	Bye		7:18.59	6 **SC/D**	7:02.76	4 **FD**	6:58.44	21
Ahmed Abdelaal; Mohamed Kota	Men's lightweight double sculls	7:20.92	5 **R**	7:14.95	5 **FC**	Bye				6:37.92	16

Qualification Legend: FA=Final A (medal); FB=Final B (non-medal); FC=Final C (non-medal); FD=Final D (non-medal); FE=Final E (non-medal); FF=Final F (non-medal); SA/B=Semifinals A/B; SC/D=Semifinals C/D; SE/F=Semifinals E/F; QF=Quarterfinals; R=Repechage

== Sailing ==
Egyptian sailors qualified one boat in each of the following classes through the 2023 African Regatta in Soma Bay, Egypt.

Medal race events

Athlete	Event	Race											Net points	Final rank
Athlete	Event	1	2	3	4	5	6	7	8	9	10	M*	Net points	Final rank
Aly Badawy	Men's ILCA 7	37	40	38	36	41^{†}	41	29	39	—N/a			260	41
Khouloud Mansy	Women's ILCA 6	40	36	31	39	41^{†}	41	35	40	36	—N/a		298	39

M = Medal race; EL = Eliminated – did not advance into the medal race

== Shooting ==
Egyptian shooters achieved quota places for the following events based on their results at the 2022 and 2023 ISSF World Championships, 2023 African Championships, and 2024 ISSF World Olympic Qualification Tournament.

Men

Athlete	Event	Qualification		Semifinal		Final	
Athlete	Event	Points	Rank	Points	Rank	Points	Rank
Ibrahim Korayiem	50 m rifle 3 positions	576-17x	41	Did not advance			
Mohamed Handy Abdelkader	10 m air rifle	627.8	24	Did not advance			
Ibrahim Korayiem	10 m air rifle	625.3	39	Did not advance			
Omar Mohamed	25 m rapid fire pistol	576-18x	24	Did not advance			
Azmy Mehelba	Skeet	121	10	Did not advance			
Omar Hesham Ibrahim	Skeet	106	29	Did not advance			

Women

Athlete	Event	Qualification		Semifinal		Final	
Athlete	Event	Points	Rank	Points	Rank	Points	Rank
Remas Khalil	10 m air rifle	625.5	29	Did not advance			
Mai Magdy Elsayed Abuqarn	10 m air rifle	624.7	35	Did not advance			
Nour Abbas Mohammed	25 m pistol	568-18x	38	Did not advance			
Nour Abbas Mohammed	10 m air pistol	DNS		Did not advance			
Hala El-Gohari	10 m air pistol	574-15x	12	Did not advance			
Maggy Ashmawy	Trap	110	27	Did not advance			
Amira Aboushokka	Skeet	107	29	Did not advance			

Mixed

Athlete	Event	Qualification		Final	
Athlete	Event	Points	Rank	Points	Rank
Ibrahim Korayiem; Remas Khalil	10 m air rifle team	620.6	28	Did not advance	
Mohamed Abdelkader; Mai Magdy Elsayed	10 m air rifle team	626.3	11	Did not advance	

== Swimming ==
Egyptian swimmers achieved the entry standards in the following events for Paris 2024 (a maximum of two swimmers under the Olympic Qualifying Time (OST) and potentially at the Olympic Consideration Time (OCT)):

Athlete	Event	Heat		Semifinal		Final	
Athlete	Event	Time	Rank	Time	Rank	Time	Rank
Marwan El-Kamash	Men's 800 m freestyle	8:07.00	8	Did not advance			27
Marwan El-Kamash	Men's 1500 m freestyle	DNS		Did not advance			
Lojine Abdalla Salah	Women's 200 m freestyle	2:07.19	8	Did not advance			24

== Table tennis ==
Egypt entered a full squad of male & female table tennis player into the Games, by virtue of their gold medal results at the 2023 ITTF African Championships in Tunis, Tunisia.

Men

Athlete	Event	Preliminary	Round of 64	Round of 32	Round of 16	Quarterfinals	Semifinals	Final / BM	
Athlete	Event	Opposition Result	Opposition Result	Opposition Result	Opposition Result	Opposition Result	Opposition Result	Opposition Result	Rank
Omar Assar	Singles	Bye	Rakotoarimanana (MAD); **W** 4–1	Mino (ECU); **W** 4–0	Gerassimenko (KAZ); **W** 4–2	T Möregårdh (SWE); **L** 1–4	Did not advance		
Mohamed El-Beiali	Singles	Bye	Redzimski (POL); **L** 0–4	Did not advance					
Omar Assar; Mohamed El-Beiali; Youssef Abdel-Aziz	Team	—N/a			Chinese Taipei; **L** 0–3	Did not advance			

Women

Athlete	Event	Preliminary	Round of 64	Round of 32	Round of 16	Quarterfinals	Semifinals	Final / BM	
Athlete	Event	Opposition Result	Opposition Result	Opposition Result	Opposition Result	Opposition Result	Opposition Result	Opposition Result	Rank
Dina Meshref	Singles	Bye	Xiao (ESP); **W** 4–1	Hayata (JPN); **L** 0–4	Did not advance				
Hana Goda	Singles	Bye	Eerland (NED); **L** 0–4	Did not advance					
Dina Meshref; Hana Goda; Mariam Alhodaby	Team	—N/a			China; **L** 0–3	Did not advance			

Mixed

Athlete	Event	Round of 16	Quarterfinals	Semifinals	Final / BM	
Athlete	Event	Opposition Result	Opposition Result	Opposition Result	Opposition Result	Rank
Omar Assar; Dina Meshref	Doubles	Wang C (CHN); Sun Y (CHN); **L** 0–4	Did not advance			

== Taekwondo ==
Egypt qualified three athletes to compete at the games. Seif Eissa obtained one of five available spots in the men's 80 kg division through the final Olympics ranking. Meanwhile, Ahmed Nassar and Aya Shehata qualified for Paris 2024 following the triumph of their victory in the semifinal round in their own respective division at the 2024 African Qualification Tournament in Dakar, Senegal.

Athlete	Event	Qualification	Round of 16	Quarterfinals	Semifinals	Repechage	Final / BM	
Athlete	Event	Opposition Result	Opposition Result	Opposition Result	Opposition Result	Opposition Result	Opposition Result	Rank
Ahmed Nassar	Men's –68 kg	Bye	Alaphilippe (FRA); **L** 0–2	Did not advance				
Seif Eissa	Men's –80 kg	Bye	Hrnic (DEN); **L** 0–2	Did not advance				
Aya Shehata	Women's –67 kg	—N/a	Castro (ESP); **W** 2–1	Chaâri (BEL); **L** 0–2	Did not advance			

== Tennis ==
Egypt entered only one tennis player into the Olympic tournament. Mayar Sherif secured an outright berth by winning the bronze medal at the 2023 African Games in Accra, Ghana, who replaced the gold medalist Angella Okutoyi of Kenya.

Athlete	Event	Round of 64	Round of 32	Round of 16	Quarterfinal	Semifinal	Final / BM	
Athlete	Event	Opposition Result	Opposition Result	Opposition Result	Opposition Result	Opposition Result	Opposition Result	Rank
Mayar Sherif	Women's singles	Wozniacki (DEN); **L** 6–2, 5–7, 1–6	Did not advance					

== Volleyball ==
=== Beach ===
Egypt women's pair qualified for Paris after winning the 2024 CAVB Continental Cup Final in Martil, Morocco.

Athletes	Event	Preliminary round				Round of 16	Quarterfinal	Semifinal	Final / BM	
Athletes	Event	Opposition Score	Opposition Score	Opposition Score	Rank	Opposition Score	Opposition Score	Opposition Score	Opposition Score	Rank
Marwa Abdelhady; Doaa Elghobashy	Women's	Ana Patricia / Duda (BRA); **L** (14–21, 19–21)	Gottardi / Menegatti (ITA); **L** (16–21, 10–21)	Fernández / Soria (ESP); **L** (18–21, 14–21)	4	Did not advance				19

=== Indoor ===
Summary

Team	Event	Group stage				Quarterfinal	Semifinal	Final / BM	
Team	Event	Opposition Score	Opposition Score	Opposition Score	Rank	Opposition Score	Opposition Score	Opposition Score	Rank
Egypt men's	Men's tournament	Poland; **L** 0–3	Italy; **L** 0–3	Brazil; **L** 0–3	4	Did not advance			

==== Men's tournament ====
Egypt's men's volleyball team qualified for the Olympics by finishing as the top-ranked African nation in the June 2024 edition of the FIVB World Rankings.

Team roster

The roster was announced on 9 July 2024.

Head coach: (Spain) Fernando Muñoz

- 2 Ahmed Azab Abdelrahman OH
- 5 Mohamed Osman Elhaddad MB
- 6 Mohamed Hassan L
- 8 Abdelrahman Elhossiny Eissa OH
- 9 Mohamed Sayedin Asran OH
- 10 Mohamed Masoud MB
- 12 Hossam Abdalla (c) S
- 14 Seifeldin Hassan Aly OP
- 15 Abdelrahman Seoudy MB
- 16 Mostafa Gaber Abdelsalam Abdelmoaty S
- 17 Reda Haikal OP
- 22 Mohamed Moustafa Issa OH

Group play

Pos	Team	Pld	W	L	Pts	SW	SL	SR	SPW	SPL	SPR	Qualification
1	Italy	3	**3**	0	9	9	2	4.500	269	224	1.201	Quarterfinals
2	Poland	3	**2**	1	5	7	5	1.400	260	256	1.016	Quarterfinals
3	Brazil	3	**1**	2	4	6	6	1.000	273	241	1.133	Quarterfinals
4	Egypt	3	**0**	3	0	0	9	0.000	144	225	0.640	

Source: Olympics
Rules for classification: Tiebreakers

27 July 2024; 17:00	**Poland**	**3–0**	Egypt	South Paris Arena 1, Paris; Attendance: 9,408; Referees: Epaminondas Gerothodoros (GRE), Ivaylo Ivanov (BUL)
27 July 2024; 17:00	(25–21, 25–19, 25–13); P2 Report			South Paris Arena 1, Paris; Attendance: 9,408; Referees: Epaminondas Gerothodoros (GRE), Ivaylo Ivanov (BUL)

30 July 2024; 09:00	**Italy**	**3–0**	Egypt	South Paris Arena 1, Paris; Attendance: 9,415; Referees: Hamid Al-Rousi (UAE), Wojciech Maroszek (POL)
30 July 2024; 09:00	(25–15, 25–16, 25–20); P2 Report			South Paris Arena 1, Paris; Attendance: 9,415; Referees: Hamid Al-Rousi (UAE), Wojciech Maroszek (POL)

2 August 2024; 13:00	**Brazil**	**3–0**	Egypt	South Paris Arena 1, Paris; Attendance: 9,407; Referees: Scott Dziewirz (CAN), Wang Ziling (CHN)
2 August 2024; 13:00	(25–11, 25–13, 25–16); P2 Report			South Paris Arena 1, Paris; Attendance: 9,407; Referees: Scott Dziewirz (CAN), Wang Ziling (CHN)

== Weightlifting ==
Egypt entered five weightlifters into the Olympic competition. Karim Abokahla (men's 89 kg), Abdelrahman El-Sayed (men's +102 kg), Neama Said (women's 71 kg), Sara Ahmed (women's 81 kg) and Halima Abbas (women's +81 kg) secured one of the top ten slots in their respective weight divisions based on the IWF Olympic Qualification Rankings.

Athlete	Event	Snatch		Clean & Jerk		Total	Rank
Athlete	Event	Result	Rank	Result	Rank	Total	Rank
Karim Abokahla	Men's −89 kg	165	8	—N/a		DNF	
Abdelrahman El-Sayed	Men's +102 kg	183	8	233	7	416	7
Neama Said	Women's −71 kg	97	10	125	8	222	9
Sara Ahmed	Women's −81 kg	117	3	151	2	268	2nd place, silver medalist(s)
Halima Abbas	Women's +81 kg	115	9	145	8	260	7

== Wrestling ==
Egypt qualified eleven wrestlers for the following classes in the Olympic competition. Abdellatif Mohamed qualified for the games by virtue of top five results through the 2023 World Championships in Belgrade, Serbia; nine wrestlers qualified by winning the semifinal round at the 2024 African & Oceania Olympic Qualification Tournament in Alexandria, Egypt; and one wrestler qualified for the games through the 2024 World Qualification Tournament in Istanbul, Turkey.

Key:

- VT (ranking points: 5–0 or 0–5) – Victory by fall.
- VB (ranking points: 5–0 or 0–5) – Victory by injury (VF for forfeit, VA for withdrawal or disqualification)
- PP (ranking points: 3–1 or 1–3) – Decision by points – the loser with technical points.
- PO (ranking points: 3–0 or 0–3) – Decision by points – the loser without technical points.
- ST (ranking points: 4–0 or 0–4) – Great superiority – the loser without technical points and a margin of victory of at least 8 (Greco-Roman) or 10 (freestyle) points.
- SP (ranking points: 4–1 or 1–4) – Technical superiority – the loser with technical points and a margin of victory of at least 8 (Greco-Roman) or 10 (freestyle) points.

Freestyle

Athlete	Event	Round of 32	Round of 16	Quarterfinal	Semifinal	Repechage	Final / BM	
Athlete	Event	Opposition Result	Opposition Result	Opposition Result	Opposition Result	Opposition Result	Opposition Result	Rank
Gamal Mohamed	Men's −57 kg	—N/a	Cruz (PUR); **L** 1–4	Did not advance				
Amr Reda Hussen	Men's −74 kg	Bye	Lu (CHN); **L** 4–14	Did not advance				
Mostafa El-Ders	Men's −97 kg	—N/a	Yergali (KAZ); **L** 2–6	Did not advance				
Diaaeldin Kamal	Men's −125 kg	—N/a	Meshvildishvili (AZE); **L** 0–4	Did not advance				
Nada Medani	Women's −50 kg	—N/a	Feng (CHN); **L** 2–7	Did not advance				

Greco-Roman

Athlete	Event	Round of 32	Round of 16	Quarterfinals	Semifinals	Repechage	Final / BM	
Athlete	Event	Opposition Result	Opposition Result	Opposition Result	Opposition Result	Opposition Result	Opposition Result	Rank
Moamen Ahmed Mohamed	Men's −60 kg	Bye	Cao (CHN); **L** 2–6	Did not advance		Rodríguez (VEN); **L** 1–12	Did not advance	
Mohamed Ibrahim El-Sayed	Men's −67 kg	—N/a	Jafarov (AZE); **L** 0–9	Did not advance				
Mahmoud Abdelrahman	Men's −77 kg	—N/a	Vardanyan (UZB); **L** 0–9	Did not advance				
Mohamed Metwally	Men's −87 kg	—N/a	Tursynov (KAZ); **L** 1–10	Did not advance				
Mohamed Ali Gabr	Men's −97 kg	—N/a	Kajaia (SRB); **W** 6–1	Khaslakhanau (AIN); **W** 4–1	Saravi (IRI); **L** 0–6	Bye	Dzhuzupbekov (KGZ); **L** 1–2	5
Abdellatif Mohamed	Men's −130 kg	—N/a	Bakır (TUR); **W** 3–1	Acosta (CHI); **L** 1–2	Did not advance	Milov (BUL); **W** 6–4	Lingzhe (CHN); **L** 2–5	5
