= Aysha Morgado =

Angolan rhythmic gymnast (born 2006)

- Born: 2006 (age 19–20) Luanda

Gymnastics career
- Discipline: Rhythmic gymnastics
- Country represented: Angola (2022-)
- Club: Clube Recreativo do Feijó
Medal record
Rhythmic Gymnastics
Representing Angola
African Championships
Bronze medal – third place	2022 Cairo	Team
Bronze medal – third place	2023 Moka	Team
Bronze medal – third place	2025 Cairo	Team
Bronze medal – third place	2026 Tshwane	Team}

Aysha Morgado (born 2006) is an Angolan rhythmic gymnast. She's a multiple medalist at the African Championships.

== Career ==
Morgado became age eligible for senior competitions in 2022, being selected for the African Championships in Cairo where she was 19th in the All-Around and won bronze in teams along Luana Gomes and Sofia Higino.

In 2023 she competed in the 2023 African Championships in Moka, being 14th overall and taking bronze in teams with Luana Gomes and Elizabeth Mangundo.

At the 2025 African Championships in Cairo she took 10th place in the All-Around, 12th with hoop, 8th with ball, 13th with clubs, 11th with ribbon and won bronze in teams with Luana Gomes.

The following year she was selected for the 2026 African Championships in Tshwane, being 10th with hoop, 9th with ball and won bronze in teams with Luana Gomes and Florencia Missende.

== Routine music information ==
Year	Apparatus	Music title
2026	Hoop	
2026	Ball	
2026	Clubs	
2026	Ribbon	
2025	Hoop	
2025	Ball	La Bohème by Kendji Girac
2025	Clubs	
2025	Ribbon	
