= Chade Jansen =

South African rhythmic gymnast

- Full name: Chade Gillian Jansen
- Born: 26 August 2009 (age 17)

Gymnastics career
- Discipline: Rhythmic gymnastics
- Country represented: South Africa (2022-)
Medal record
Rhythmic Gymnastics
Representing South Africa
African Championships
Silver medal – second place	2022 Cairo	Team
Silver medal – second place	2024 Kigali	Team
Silver medal – second place	2025 Cairo	Team
Silver medal – second place	2026 Tshwane	Team
Bronze medal – third place	2022 Cairo	Clubs
Bronze medal – third place	2024 Kigali	All-Around
Bronze medal – third place	2024 Kigali	Hoop
Bronze medal – third place	2024 Kigali	Clubs
Bronze medal – third place	2024 Kigali	Ribbon

Chade Gillian Jansen (born 26 August 2009) is a South African rhythmic gymnast. She represents her country in international competitions.

== Biography ==
=== Junior ===
Jansen debuted internationally in 2022, when she was selected for the African Championships in Cairo. She won silver in teams and bronze with clubs.

The following year, she competed at the Julieta Shishmanova tournament in Bulgaria, where she placed 5th in the ribbon final and was also awarded a special prize for artistry. In July, she was selected for the Junior World Championships in Cluj-Napoca along with Tricha Richards and the junior group. There, she was 31st in teams, 44th with ball and 38th with clubs. In September, she won silver in the all-around and won gold in all the event finals at the Gym Games.

In 2024, she won silver in teams (along with her teammates Jeanne Marie Kitshoff, Kristen Hannie and Tricha Richards) at the African Championships in Kigali. Individually, she won four bronze medals, one in the all-around and three in the event finals with hoop, clubs and ribbon. At the Gym Games, she won gold in the all-around.

=== Senior ===
Jansen became a senior in 2025. In May, she was selected for the African Championships in Cairo along with Stephanie Dimitrova.
