= Yulia Galukhin =

South African rhythmic gymnast

- Born: 6 January 2005 (age 21)

Gymnastics career
- Discipline: Rhythmic gymnastics
- Country represented: South Africa; (2022-)
- Club: Cape Olympia Rhythmic Gymnastics Club
- Head coach: Natasha Galukhina
Medal record
Rhythmic Gymnastics
Representing South Africa
African Championships
Silver medal – second place	2022 Cairo	Team
Bronze medal – third place	2022 Cairo	All-Around
Bronze medal – third place	2022 Cairo	Ribbon

Yulia Galukhin (born 6 January 2005) is a South African rhythmic gymnast. She's a multiple African Championships' medalist.

== Personal life ==
Her mother Natasha Galukhina founded Cape Olympia Rhythmic Gymnastics Club in 1997 in Cape Town. Her sisters Daria and Alina have competed in rhythmic gymnastics at national level in South Africa. She took up the sport at age four, as her mom brought her along to her club, and began competing at age five. Her idol is Georgian rhythmic gymnast Salome Pazhava. She was named 2020 Junior Rhythmic Gymnast of the Year by Gymnastics South Africa.

== Career ==
Yulia debuted internationally at the 2022 African Championships in Cairo winning silver in teams, along Stephanie Dimitrova, Kayla Rondi and Shannon Gardiner, as well as bronze in the All-Around and with ribbon. In early September of the same year she was selected to compete at the World Championships in Sofia, taking 74th place in the All-Around, 78th with hoop and ball, 74th with clubs and 63rd with ribbon.
