= 2024 African Rhythmic Gymnastics Championships =

Rhythmic gymnastics competition

2024 African Gymnastics Championships
- Venue: Amahoro Stadium
- Location: Kigali, Rwanda
- Start date: 25 April 2024
- End date: 26 April 2024

The 2024 African Rhythmic Gymnastics Championships also known as The 18th African Championships were held from 25 to 26 April 2024 in Kigali, Rwanda. The competition was a qualifying event for the 2024 Olympic Games. The Olympic berths went to the winners of the all-around competition, individual Aliaa Saleh and the Egyptian group.

== Medal winners ==
=== Senior ===
Event	Gold	Silver	Bronze
Team
Team	Egypt; Aliaa Saleh; Habiba Marzouk; Ledia Behairy; Mariam Selim	South Africa; Alina Galukhin; Kgaogelo Maake; Stephanie Dimitrova; Wothabo Nene	Tunisia; Chahd Ouechtati; Eya Boushih; Malak Sellami; Molka Letifi
Individual Finals
All-Around	Aliaa Saleh (EGY)	Luana Gomes (ANG)	Habiba Marzouk (EGY)
Hoop	Aliaa Saleh (EGY)	Luana Gomes (ANG)	Habiba Marzouk (EGY)
Ball	Aliaa Saleh (EGY)	Habiba Marzouk (EGY)	Luana Gomes (ANG)
Clubs	Luana Gomes (ANG)	Habiba Marzouk (EGY)	Aliaa Saleh (EGY)
Ribbon	Mariam Selim (EGY)	Aliaa Saleh (EGY)	Luana Gomes (ANG)
Group Finals
All-Around	Egypt; Amina Sobeih; Farida Hussein; Lamar Behairi; Johara Eldeeb; Abeer Ramadan; Jomana Abouelmagd	South Africa; Babalwa Mkhize; Bericia Le Roux; Crystal Viljoen; Emily Impson; Nina Gaspar	Angola; Sofia Higino; Celma Nunda; Evaudina Severino; Abigail Sousa; Laurinda Tito

=== Junior ===
Event	Gold	Silver	Bronze
Team
Team	Egypt; Alia Ahmed; Farida Bahnas; Iman Abdelhalim; Lina Heleika	South Africa; Chade Jansen; Jeanne Marie Kitshoff; Kristen Hannie; Tricha Richards	Tunisia; Beya Zouaoui; Ghofrane Bouabidi; Mariem Karray; Mayssoun Said
Individual Finals
All-Around	Alia Ahmed (EGY)	Lina Heleika (EGY)	Chade Jansen (RSA)
Hoop	Alia Ahmed (EGY)	Lina Heleika (EGY)	Chade Jansen (RSA)
Ball	Alia Ahmed (EGY)	Lina Heleika (EGY)	Tricha Richards (RSA)
Clubs	Alia Ahmed (EGY)	Lina Heleika (EGY)	Chade Jansen (RSA)
Ribbon	Lina Heleika (EGY)	Alia Ahmed (EGY)	Chade Jansen (RSA)
Group Finals
All-Around	Egypt	South Africa	Tunisia
5 Balls	Egypt	South Africa	Tunisia
5 Ropes	Egypt	South Africa	Tunisia

== Medal count ==
Rank	Nation	Gold	Silver	Bronze	Total
1	Egypt	15	8	3	26
2	Angola	1	2	3	6
3	South Africa	0	6	5	11
4	Tunisia	0	0	5	5
Totals (4 entries)		16	16	16	48
