= Tricha Richards =

South African rhythmic gymnast

- Born: 17 June 2009 (age 17)

Gymnastics career
- Discipline: Rhythmic gymnastics
- Country represented: South Africa; (2022-)
Medal record
Rhythmic Gymnastics
Representing South Africa
African Championships
Silver medal – second place	2022 Cairo	Team
Silver medal – second place	2024 Kigali	Team
Bronze medal – third place	2024 Kigali	Ball

Tricha Richards (born 17 June 2009) is a South African rhythmic gymnast. She represents her country in international competitions.

== Career ==
Richards debuted internationally in 2022 when she was selected for the African Championships in Cairo, when she won silver in teams along Chade Jansen, Kgaogelo Maake, Zara Rodt.

The following year she placed 5th with ball, 8th with clubs and 9th with hoop at the Julieta Shishmanova tournament in Bulgaria. In July she was selected for the Junior World Championships in Cluj-Napoca along Chade Jansen and the junior group, she was 31st in teams, 52nd with hoop and 44th with ribbon. In September she won bronze in the All-Around and silver with hoop at the Gym Games.

In 2024 she won silver in teams (along Jeanne Marie Kitshoff, Kristen Hannie and Chade Jansen), and won bronze with ball at the African Championships in Kigali.
