= Farida Hussein =

Egyptian rhythmic gymnast

- فريدة حسين
- Full name: Farida Adel Hussein Omar Hussein
- Nicknames: Foffa, Foufy
- Born: 7 February 2006 (age 20) Cairo, Egypt

Gymnastics career
- Discipline: Rhythmic gymnastics
- Country represented: Egypt (2022 - present)
- Club: Maadi Sporting and Yacht Club
- Head coaches: Noha Hossam, Mayar Ragab
Medal record
Rhythmic Gymnastics
Representing Egypt
African Championships
Gold medal – first place	2022 Cairo	Team
Gold medal – first place	2022 Cairo	Hoop
Gold medal – first place	2022 Cairo	Clubs
Gold medal – first place	2023 Moka	Team
Gold medal – first place	2023 Moka	Ribbon
Gold medal – first place	2024 Kigali	Group all-around
Silver medal – second place	2022 Cairo	All-around
Silver medal – second place	2022 Cairo	Ribbon
Bronze medal – third place	2023 Moka	Hoop
Bronze medal – third place	2023 Moka	Ball

Farida Adel Hussein Omar Hussein (Arabic: فريدة حسين; born 7 February 2006) is an Egyptian rhythmic gymnast. As an individual gymnast, she won five medals at the 2022 African Championships and four medals at the 2023 African Championships. She was incorporated into the senior national group in 2024 and helped them win the 2024 African group all-around title, allowing them to compete at the 2024 Summer Olympics.

== Early life ==
Hussein was born on 7 February 2006 in Cairo and has an older brother, Omar, and an older sister, Nour. She began rhythmic gymnastics when she was three years old because her older sister was an artistic gymnast and Hussein was interested in watching the rhythmic gymnasts training in the same club.

== Career ==
At the 2022 African Championships in Cairo, Hussein won the all-around silver medal behind teammate Aliaa Saleh. In the event finals, she won gold medals in hoop and clubs and a silver medal behind Saleh in ribbon. Additionally, the Egyptian team won the gold medal.

At the 2023 African Championships in Moka, Hussein won gold medals with the Egyptian team and in the ribbon final. She also won bronze medals in the hoop and ball finals. She competed with the clubs and hoop at the 2023 World Championships in Valencia, finishing 66th and 52nd in the qualification round, respectively.

In 2024, Hussein was incorporated into the senior group, winning gold in the all-around, alongside Johara Eldeeb, Abeer Ramadan, Lamar Behairi and Amina Sobeih, at the African Championships in Kigali, thus earning a quota for the 2024 Olympic Games in Paris. In June, the group competed at the Pharaoh’s Cup and finished fourth in 5 hoops and won the bronze medal in 3 ribbons and 2 balls. At the Olympic Games, Hussein and the Egyptian group finished 14th in the qualification round for the group all-around and did not advance to the final.
