= Alia Ahmed =

Egyptian rhythmic gymnast (born 2009)

- Born: 1 March 2009 (age 17) Alexandria, Egypt

Gymnastics career
- Discipline: Rhythmic gymnastics
- Country represented: Egypt (2022-)
Medal record
Rhythmic Gymnastics
Representing Egypt
African Championships
| Gold medal – first place | 2022 Cairo | Team |
| Gold medal – first place | 2022 Cairo | All-Around |
| Gold medal – first place | 2022 Cairo | Hoop |
| Gold medal – first place | 2022 Cairo | Clubs |
| Gold medal – first place | 2022 Cairo | Ribbon |
| Gold medal – first place | 2024 Kigali | Team |
| Gold medal – first place | 2024 Kigali | All-Around |
| Gold medal – first place | 2024 Kigali | Hoop |
| Gold medal – first place | 2024 Kigali | Ball |
| Gold medal – first place | 2024 Kigali | Clubs |
| Gold medal – first place | 2025 Cairo | Hoop |
| Gold medal – first place | 2025 Cairo | Ball |
| Gold medal – first place | 2025 Cairo | Clubs |
| Gold medal – first place | 2025 Cairo | Ribbons |
| Silver medal – second place | 2022 Cairo | Ball |
| Silver medal – second place | 2024 Kigali | Ribbon |
| Silver medal – second place | 2025 Cairo | All-Around |

Alia Ahmed (born 1 March 2009) is an Egyptian rhythmic gymnast. She's a multiple medalist at the African Championships.

== Career ==
The daughter of Noha Abu Shabana, president of the International technical committee of the FIG for rhythmic gymnastics since 2021, Alia took up gymnastics at a young age.

In 2022 she competed in her first African Championships, where she won gold in teams, the All-Around, hoop, clubs and ribbon as well as silver with ball.

Selected to represent Egypt at the junior Mediterranean Championships she won All-Around gold, silver with hoop, ball and clubs and bronze with ribbon. At the Junior World Championships she competed with ball and clubs, being 17th and 12th respectively, the Egyptian team was 16th.

In 2024 she took part in the international tournament in Sofia where she took 4th place in the ribbon final. A the African Championships she took gold in teams, the All-Around, with hoop, ball and clubs and silver with ribbon.
