= 2023 African Rhythmic Gymnastics Championships =

Rhythmic gymnastics competition

2023 African Gymnastics Championships
- Venue: Cote D'or National Sports Complex
- Location: Moka, Mauritius
- Start date: 19 May 2023
- End date: 20 May 2023

The 2023 African Rhythmic Gymnastics Championships also known as The 17th African Championships was held from 19 to 20 May 2023 in Moka, Mauritius.

== Medal winners ==
Event	Gold	Silver	Bronze
All-around
Individual	Habiba Marzouk (EGY)	Aliaa Saleh (EGY)	Luana Gomes (ANG)
Team	Egypt; Farida Hussein; Habiba Marzouk; Aliaa Saleh	South Africa; Azra Dewan; Stephanie Dimitrova; Kgaogelo Maake	Angola; Luana Gomes; Aysha Morgado; Elizabeth Natalia Camati Mangundo
Hoop	Luana Gomes (ANG)	Aliaa Saleh (EGY)	Farida Hussein (EGY)
Ball	Aliaa Saleh (EGY)	Luana Gomes (ANG)	Farida Hussein (EGY)
Clubs	Luana Gomes (ANG)	Stephanie Dimitrova (RSA)	Azra Dewan (RSA)
Ribbon	Farida Hussein (EGY)	Luana Gomes (ANG)	Stephanie Dimitrova (RSA)

== Medal count ==
Rank	Nation	Gold	Silver	Bronze	Total
1	Egypt	4	2	2	8
2	Angola	2	2	2	6
3	South Africa	0	2	2	4
Totals (3 entries)		6	6	6	18
