= 2022 African Rhythmic Gymnastics Championships =

Rhythmic Gymnastic Championship

2022 African Gymnastics Championships
- Venue: Sports Development Center
- Location: Cairo, Egypt
- Start date: 17 June 2022
- End date: 19 June 2022

The 2022 African Rhythmic Gymnastics Championships also known as The 16th African Championships was held from 17 to 19 June 2022 in Cairo, Egypt.

== Medal winners ==
=== Senior ===
==== Team ====
| Event | Gold | Silver | Bronze |
|---|---|---|---|
| All-around | Egypt; Aliaa Saleh; Farida Hussein; Jomana Abouelmagd; Amina Sobeih | South Africa; Yulia Galukhin; Stephanie Dimitrova; Kayla Rondi; Shannon Gardiner | Angola; Luana Gomes; Sofia Higino; Aysha Morgado |

==== Individual ====
| Event | Gold | Silver | Bronze |
|---|---|---|---|
| All-around | Aliaa Saleh (EGY) | Farida Hussein (EGY) | Yulia Galukhin (RSA) |
| Hoop | Farida Hussein (EGY) | Aliaa Saleh (EGY) | Stephanie Dimitrova (RSA) |
| Ball | Aliaa Saleh (EGY) | Stephanie Dimitrova (RSA) | Jomana Abouelmagd (EGY) |
| Clubs | Farida Hussein (EGY) | Aliaa Saleh (EGY) | Luana Gomes (ANG) |
| Ribbon | Aliaa Saleh (EGY) | Farida Hussein (EGY) | Yulia Galukhin (RSA) |

==== Group ====
| Event | Gold | Silver | Bronze |
|---|---|---|---|
| All-around | Egypt; Nazly Bahnas; Khadija Byoumy; Sandrie Behairy; Laila Darwish; Malak Gaber; Dana Salem | Tunisia; Eya Derouiche; Khadija El Cadhi; Islem Karabi; Rym Ouechteti; Yakin Sghaier | —N/a |
| 5 Balls | Egypt; Nazly Bahnas; Khadija Byoumy; Sandrie Behairy; Laila Darwish; Malak Gaber; Dana Salem | Tunisia; Eya Derouiche; Khadija El Cadhi; Islem Karabi; Rym Ouechteti; Yakin Sghaier | —N/a |
| 3 Hoops + 2 Clubs | Egypt; Nazly Bahnas; Khadija Byoumy; Sandrie Behairy; Laila Darwish; Malak Gaber; Dana Salem | Tunisia; Eya Derouiche; Khadija El Cadhi; Islem Karabi; Rym Ouechteti; Yakin Sghaier | —N/a |

=== Junior ===
==== Team ====
| Event | Gold | Silver | Bronze |
|---|---|---|---|
| All-around | Egypt; Alia Ahmed; Lamar Behairi; Farida Mansy; Abeer Ramadan | South Africa; Chade Jansen; Kgaogelo Maake; Tricha Richards; Zara Rodt | Tunisia; Mayssa Arfa; Maram Ben Larbi; Eya Boushis; Chahd Ouechtati |

==== Individual ====
| Event | Gold | Silver | Bronze |
|---|---|---|---|
| All-around | Alia Ahmed (EGY) | Abeer Ramadan (EGY) | Kgaogelo Maake (RSA) |
| Hoop | Alia Ahmed (EGY) | Lamar Behairi (EGY) | Kgaogelo Maake (RSA) |
| Ball | Abeer Ramadan (EGY) | Alia Ahmed (EGY) | Kgaogelo Maake (RSA) |
| Clubs | Alia Ahmed (EGY) | Abeer Ramadan (EGY) | Chade Jansen (RSA) |
| Ribbon | Alia Ahmed (EGY) | Lamar Behairi (EGY) | Kgaogelo Maake (RSA) |

==== Group ====
| Event | Gold | Silver | Bronze |
|---|---|---|---|
| All-around | Egypt | Tunisia | —N/a |
| 5 Balls | Egypt | Tunisia | —N/a |
| 5 Ropes | Egypt | Tunisia | —N/a |
