= 2000 African Rhythmic Gymnastics Championships =

2000 African Gymnastics Championships
- Location: Tunis, Tunisia
- Start date: 18 November 2000
- End date: 26 November 2000

The 2000 African Rhythmic Gymnastics Championships were held from 18 November to 26 November 2000 in Tunis, Tunisia,

The championships were organised along the 2000 African Artistic Gymnastics Championships.

== Medal winners ==
Games	Gold	Silver	Bronze
Seniors
Teams	Egypt	South Africa	
Rope	Sherin Taama (EGY)	Maha El Kachlan (EGY)	Jo-Anne Nelson (RSA)
Hoop	Sherin Taama (EGY)	Maha El Kachlan (EGY)	Jo-Anne Nelson (RSA)
Ball	Y Adli Yesmin (EGY)	Sherin Taama (EGY)	Jo-Anne Nelson (RSA)
Ribbon	Y Adli Yesmin (EGY)	Maha El Kachlan (EGY)	Jo-Anne Nelson (RSA)
Juniors
Teams	Egypt	South Africa	
Rope	Belinda Potgieter (RSA)	Renate Janse van Ransburg (RSA)	N Hoseei el Said (EGY)
Hoop	N Hoseei el Said (EGY)	Shalene Arnold (RSA)	A Mai Karam (EGY)
Ball	Renate Janse van Ransburg (RSA)	N Hoseei el Said (EGY)	Belinda Potgieter (RSA)
Clubs	Belinda Potgieter (RSA)	Shalene Arnold (RSA)	N Hoseei el Said (EGY)
