= Amina Sobeih =

Egyptian rhythmic gymnast

- أمينة صبيح
- Born: 18 August 2006 (age 20) Cairo, Egypt

Gymnastics career
- Discipline: Rhythmic gymnastics
- Country represented: Egypt (2022-)
Medal record
Rhythmic Gymnastics
Representing Egypt
African Championships
Gold medal – first place	2022 Cairo	Team
Gold medal – first place	2024 Kigali	Group All-Around

Amina Sobeih (Arabic: أمينة صبيح; born 18 August 2006) is an Egyptian rhythmic gymnast. She is a multiple time African champion.

== Career ==
In her first year as a senior, Amina debuted at the World Cup in Baku, ending 39th in the All-Around, 29th with hoop, 39th with ball, 40th with clubs and 36th with ribbon. In May she won gold in team along Aliaa Saleh, Farida Hussein and Jomana Abouelmagd at the 2022 African Rhythmic Gymnastics Championships in Cairo.

The following year she participated in the 2023 World Cup in Baku, being 47th in the All-Around, 53rd with hoop, 46th with ball, 38th with clubs and 34th with ribbon.

In 2024 she was incorporated into the senior group winning gold in the All-Around, along Johara Eldeeb, Farida Hussein, Abeer Ramadan and Lamar Behairi, at the African Championships in Kigali, thus earning a quota for the 2024 Olympic Games in Paris.
