= Abeer Ramadan =

Egyptian rhythmic gymnast

- عبير رمضان
- Born: 31 July 2007 (age 19) Giza, Egypt

Gymnastics career
- Discipline: Rhythmic gymnastics
- Country represented: Egypt; (2022-)
Medal record
Rhythmic Gymnastics
Representing Egypt
African Championships
Gold medal – first place	2022 Cairo	Team
Gold medal – first place	2022 Cairo	Ball
Gold medal – first place	2024 Kigali	Group All-Around
Silver medal – second place	2022 Cairo	All-Around
Silver medal – second place	2022 Cairo	Clubs

Abeer Ramadan (Arabic: عبير رمضان; born 31 July 2007) is an Egyptian rhythmic gymnast. She is a multiple time African champion.

== Career ==
As a junior Abeer competed at the 2022 African Rhythmic Gymnastics Championships in Cairo, where she won gold in teams and with ball, silver in the All-Around and with clubs.

In 2023 she became a senior, taking part in the World Cup in Portimão, being 41st in the All-Around, 36th with hoop, 36th with ball, 38th with clubs and 47th with ribbon.

In 2024 she was incorporated into the senior group winning gold in the All-Around, along Johara Eldeeb, Farida Hussein, Lamar Behairi and Amina Sobeih, at the African Championships in Kigali, thus earning a quota for the 2024 Olympic Games in Paris.
