= Brock Batty =

Australian trampoline gymnast

- Born: 4 January 2007 (age 19) Frankston, Victoria, Australia

Gymnastics career
- Discipline: Trampoline gymnastics
- Country represented: Australia
- Club: Cheltenham Youth Club
- Head coach: Dani Robb

Brock Batty (born 4 January 2007) is an Australian trampoline gymnast. He represented Australia at the 2024 Summer Olympics and is the youngest athlete to ever compete in men's trampoline at the Olympics.

== Early and personal life ==
Batty was born on 4 January 2007 in Frankston, Victoria. As a child, he enjoyed going to trampoline parks and jumping, so his mother eventually enrolled him in trampoline classes at Cheltenham Youth Club. He also played Australian rules football and basketball but chose to focus on trampolining. Because of the ceiling height at his home club, he travels to Melbourne's State Gymnastics Centre for some training sessions. As of 2024, he is a student at Frankston High School. He enjoys fishing in his free time.

== Career ==
Within two years of starting trampoline, Batty won two Australian national titles and was selected to make his international debut at the 2018 World Age Group Competitions in Saint Petersburg, Russia. While there, he finished 13th in the individual trampoline qualification round and 10th in the double mini qualification round. Then at the 2019 World Age Group Competitions, he won a bronze medal in double mini trampoline. He then won a silver medal in double mini trampoline at the 2022 World Age Group Competitions.

At the 2023 World Age Group Competitions in Birmingham, Batty won gold medals in both individual and synchronized trampoline in the 15–16 age group. Then at the 2023 Junior World Championships, he won another medal with his synchro partner Nicolas Diaz Ballas, this time a silver.

In 2024, Batty received a Tier 2 scholarship from the Sport Australia Hall of Fame. He made his senior international debut at the 2024 Baku World Cup and placed seventh in the synchro competition with Shaun Swadling. He won his first senior Australian national title in individual trampoline ahead of Swadling. As a result, he was selected to represent Australia at the 2024 Summer Olympics. At 17 years 211 days old on the day of the competition, he is the youngest male trampoline gymnast to compete at an Olympic Games.
