= 2025 African Rhythmic Gymnastics Championships =

Rhythmic gymnastics competition

2025 African Gymnastics Championships
- Venue: Cairo International stadium
- Location: Cairo, Egypt
- Start date: 2 May 2025
- End date: 3 May 2025

The 2025 African Rhythmic Gymnastics Championships also known as The 19th African Championships was held from 2 to 3 May 2025 in Cairo, Egypt.

== Medal winners ==
=== Senior ===
Event	Gold	Silver	Bronze
Team
Team	Egypt; Aliaa Saleh; Ledia Behairy; Farida Mansy	South Africa; Stephanie Dimitrova; Chade Jansen	Angola; Luana Gomes; Aysha Morgado
Individual Finals
All-Around	Luana Gomes (ANG)	Alia Ahmed (EGY)	Stephanie Dimitrova (RSA)
Hoop	Alia Ahmed (EGY)	Stephanie Dimitrova (RSA)	Farida Mansy (EGY)
Ball	Alia Ahmed (EGY)	Luana Gomes (ANG)	Stephanie Dimitrova (RSA)
Clubs	Alia Ahmed (EGY)	Luana Gomes (ANG)	Stephanie Dimitrova (RSA)
Ribbon	Alia Ahmed (EGY)	Luana Gomes (ANG)	Ledia Behairy (EGY)

== Medal count ==
* Host nation (Egypt)

Rank	Nation	Gold	Silver	Bronze	Total
1	Egypt*	5	1	2	8
2	Angola	1	3	1	5
3	South Africa	0	2	3	5
Totals (3 entries)		6	6	6	18
