= Stephanie Dimitrova =

South African rhythmic gymnast

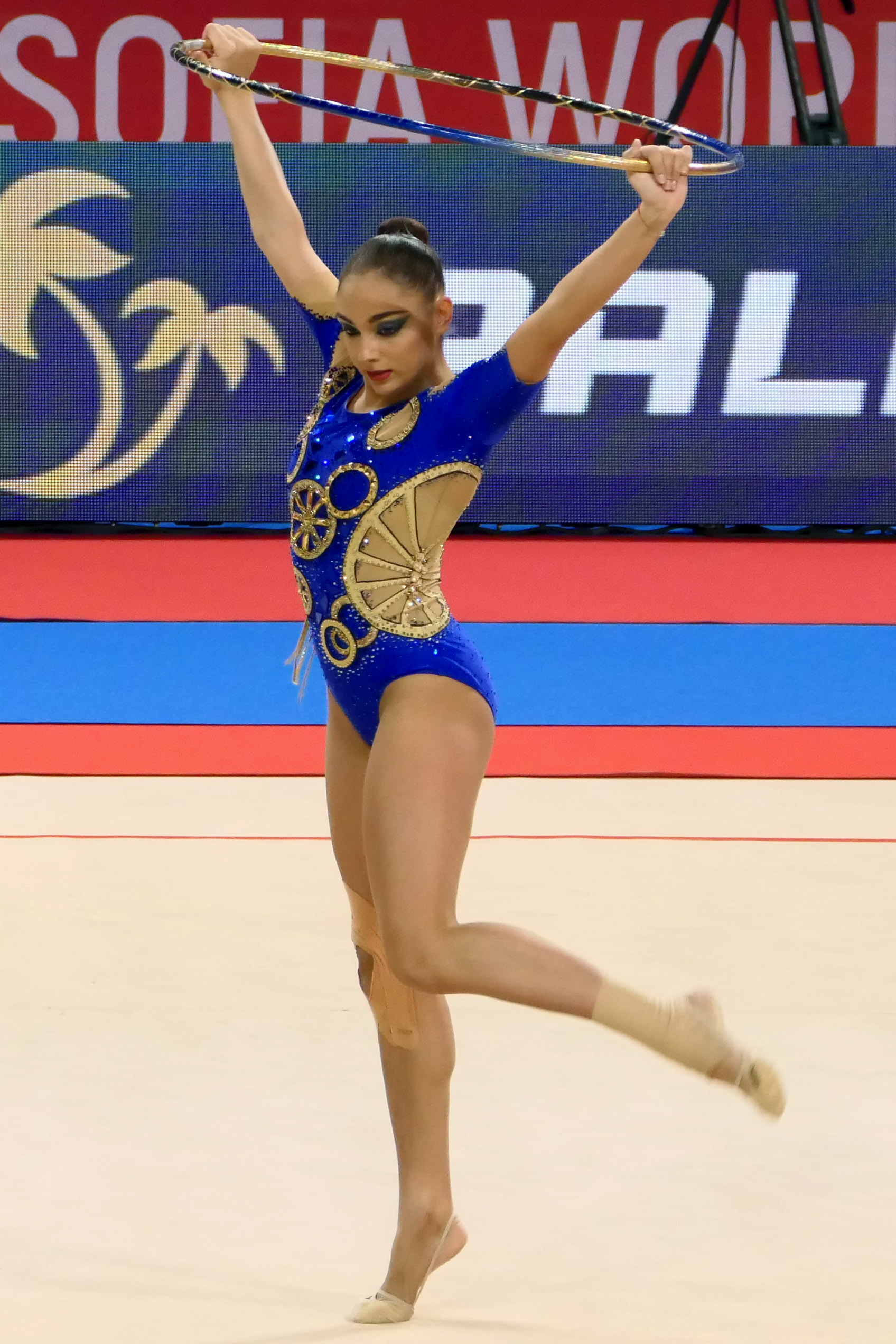
- Dimitrova in 2024
- Born: 22 October 2004 (age 21)

Gymnastics career
- Discipline: Rhythmic gymnastics
- Country represented: South Africa; (2022-)
- Club: CSKA Gymnastics
- Head coach: Lazarina Dimitrova
Medal record
Rhythmic Gymnastics
Representing South Africa
African Championships
Silver medal – second place	2023 Moka	Team
Silver medal – second place	2023 Moka	Clubs
Silver medal – second place	2022 Cairo	Team
Silver medal – second place	2022 Cairo	Ball
Silver medal – second place	2025 Cairo	Team
Silver medal – second place	2025 Cairo	Hoop
Silver medal – second place	2026 Tshwane	Team
Bronze medal – third place	2022 Cairo	Hoop
Bronze medal – third place	2023 Moka	Ribbon
Bronze medal – third place	2025 Cairo	All-Around
Bronze medal – third place	2025 Cairo	Ball
Bronze medal – third place	2025 Cairo	Clubs
Bronze medal – third place	2026 Tshwane	All-Around
Bronze medal – third place	2026 Tshwane	Ball
Bronze medal – third place	2026 Tshwane	Clubs
Bronze medal – third place	2026 Tshwane	Ribbon

Stephanie Dimitrova (born 22 October 2004) is a South African rhythmic gymnast. She has medaled multiple times at the African Championships.

== Career ==
Stephanie debuted at the 2018 World Cup in Sofia, where she was 34th in the all-around, 32nd with hoop, 35th with ball, 29th with clubs and 36th with ribbon.

In June 2022 she competed at the African Championships in Cairo and won silver in teams along with fellow South African gymnasts Yulia Galukhin, Kayla Rondi and Shannon Gardiner. She also won silver with ball and a bronze with hoop.

In 2023, she started her season at the World Cup in Sofia. She ended 43rd in the all-around, 32nd with hoop, 42nd with ball, 44th with clubs and 47th with ribbon. At the World Cup in Tashkent, she was 33rd in the all-around, 25th with hoop, 32nd with ball, 24th with clubs and 36th with ribbon. In May she took part in the African Championships in Moka, taking silvers in the team competition and with clubs and bronze with ribbon. At the last World Cup of the season in Cluj-Napoca, she was 48th in the all-around. She was then selected to represent South Africa at the World Championships in Valencia, finishing 72nd in the all-around, 66th with hoop, 71st with ball, 72nd with clubs and 81st with ribbon.

In April 2024 she took part in the World Cup in Sofia, being 53rd in the All-Around, 48th with hoop, 54th with ball, 52nd with clubs and 56th with ribbon. At the stage in Milan she retired after performing hoop.

In 2025, she debuted at the Sofia World Cup, taking 75th place overall, 81st with hoop, 76th with ball, 68th with clubs and 68th with ribbon. In May, she was selected for the African Championships in Cairo, along with Chade Jansen, and won the bronze medal in the all-around.

== Routine music information ==
Year	Apparatus	Music Title
2025	Hoop	We Can Runaway (Trailerized) by Juneau Marie
2025	Ball	Nelle tue mani (From "Gladiator") by Andrea Bocelli
2025	Clubs	Hello Afrika by Dr. Alban
2025	Ribbon	En lo Alto del Cerro by Estrella Morente
