= Aliaa Saleh =

Egyptian gymnast

- علياء صالح
- Born: 4 August 2004 (age 22) Giza, Egypt

Gymnastics career
- Discipline: Rhythmic gymnastics
- Country represented: Egypt; (2018-present)
- Club: Gezira Sporting Club
- Head coach: Noha Hossam
Medal record
Rhythmic Gymnastics
Representing Egypt
African Championships
Gold medal – first place	2020 Sharm El Sheikh	Team
Gold medal – first place	2022 Cairo	Team
Gold medal – first place	2022 Cairo	All-around
Gold medal – first place	2022 Cairo	Ball
Gold medal – first place	2022 Cairo	Ribbon
Gold medal – first place	2023 Moka	Team
Gold medal – first place	2023 Moka	Ball
Gold medal – first place	2024 Kigali	Team
Gold medal – first place	2024 Kigali	All-around
Gold medal – first place	2024 Kigali	Hoop
Gold medal – first place	2024 Kigali	Ball
Gold medal – first place	2025 Cairo	Team
Silver medal – second place	2020 Sharm El Sheikh	Ball
Silver medal – second place	2022 Cairo	Hoop
Silver medal – second place	2022 Cairo	Clubs
Silver medal – second place	2023 Moka	All-around
Silver medal – second place	2023 Moka	Hoop
Silver medal – second place	2024 Kigali	Ribbon
Bronze medal – third place	2024 Kigali	Clubs

Aliaa Saleh (Arabic: علياء صالح; born 4 August 2004) is an Egyptian rhythmic gymnast. She represented Egypt at the 2024 Summer Olympics in the women's rhythmic individual all-around. She is a 11-time African champion, including a two-time African all-around champion (2022, 2024).

== Early life ==
Saleh was born on 4 August 2004 in Giza. Before gymnastics, she tried tennis and swimming.

== Junior career ==
Saleh debuted internationally as a junior at the 2018 African Championships in Cairo. She won medals in every event: gold with the team, hoop, and clubs, silver in the all-around and with ball, and bronze with ribbon. In 2019, she was selected for the inaugural Junior World Championships in Moscow. Egypt was 23rd in the team competition, and Saleh finished 16th with the ball and 46th with clubs.

== Senior career ==
Saleh became age-eligible for senior competitions in 2020. At the 2020 African Championships in Sharm el-Sheikh, she won gold with the Egyptian team and silver with the ball. She had the third-highest score in the all-around, but she did not receive the bronze medal due to the two-per-country rule, finishing behind Habiba Marzouk and Mariam Selim.

=== 2022 ===
In 2022, she took part in the Baku World Cup, finishing 35th in the all-around. In June she competed at the African Championships in Cairo, where she won gold with the team, in the all-around, and with ball and ribbon. Additionally, she won two silver medals with hoop and clubs. In September, she was selected for the World Championships in Sofia. She finished 45th in the all-around during the qualification round.

=== 2023 ===
Saleh started the 2023 season by taking part in the Sofia World Cup, finishing 34th in the all-around. At the 2023 African Rhythmic Gymnastics Championships in Moka, she won gold with the Egyptian team and with the ball, and silver in the all-around behind teammate Habiba Marzouk and with the hoop behind Angola's Luana Gomes. At the Pharaoh's Cup in Cairo, she won the silver medal in the ball final behind American Lili Mizuno, and she won the bronze medal in the ribbon final. She once again represented Egypt at the World Championships and finished in 52nd place in the all-around during the qualification round.

=== 2024 ===
At the Miss Valentine Tartu Grand Prix, Saleh finished 21st in the all-around. She won the all-around title at the African Championships. With this result, she received the continental berth for the 2024 Summer Olympics. In the event finals, she won two additional gold medals with the hoop and ball, a silver medal with the ribbon, and a bronze medal with the clubs.

== Personal life ==
As of 2024, Saleh is studying architectural engineering at New Giza University.

== Competitive history ==
Year	Event	Team	AA	HP	BA	CL	RB
Junior
2018
2018	African Championships	1st place, gold medalist(s)	2nd place, silver medalist(s)	1st place, gold medalist(s)	2nd place, silver medalist(s)	1st place, gold medalist(s)	3rd place, bronze medalist(s)
2019
2019	Junior World Championships	23					
Senior
2020
2020	African Championships	1st place, gold medalist(s)			2nd place, silver medalist(s)		
2022	Baku World Cup		35				
2022	African Championships	1st place, gold medalist(s)	1st place, gold medalist(s)	2nd place, silver medalist(s)	1st place, gold medalist(s)	2nd place, silver medalist(s)	1st place, gold medalist(s)
2022	World Championships		45				
2023	Sofia World Cup		34				
2023	African Championships	1st place, gold medalist(s)	2nd place, silver medalist(s)	2nd place, silver medalist(s)	1st place, gold medalist(s)	4	4
2023	Pharaoh's Cup			7	2nd place, silver medalist(s)	5	3rd place, bronze medalist(s)
2023	World Championships		52				
2024	Miss Valentine Tartu Grand Prix		21				
2024	African Championships	1st place, gold medalist(s)	1st place, gold medalist(s)	1st place, gold medalist(s)	1st place, gold medalist(s)	3rd place, bronze medalist(s)	2nd place, silver medalist(s)
2024	Olympic Games		23				
