= Lamar Behairi =

Egyptian rhythmic gymnast

- لامار البحيري
- Nickname: Lamoory
- Born: 1 August 2007 (age 19) Cairo, Egypt

Gymnastics career
- Discipline: Rhythmic gymnastics
- Country represented: Egypt (2022-)
- Club: Gezira Sporting Club
- Head coaches: Mayar Ragab, Noha Hossam
Medal record
Rhythmic Gymnastics
Representing Egypt
African Championships
| Gold medal – first place | 2022 Cairo | Team |
| Gold medal – first place | 2024 Kigali | Group All-Around |
| Silver medal – second place | 2022 Cairo | Hoop |
| Silver medal – second place | 2022 Cairo | Ribbon |

Lamar Behairi (Arabic: لامار البحيري, also transliterated Lamar Behairy, born 1 August 2007) is an Egyptian rhythmic gymnast. She is a multiple time African champion.

== Personal life ==
Lamar took up the sport following her older sister, Sandrie, who is a retired elite gymnast. Her younger sister Ledia is also a successful rhythmic gymnast.

== Career ==
As a junior Lamar competed at the 2022 African Rhythmic Gymnastics Championships in Cairo, where she won gold in teams, silver with hoop and ribbon.

In 2023 she became a senior, taking part in the World Cup in Portimão, being 30th in the All-Around, 27th with hoop, 30th with ball, 21st with clubs and 50th with ribbon.

In 2024 she was incorporated into the senior group winning gold in the All-Around, along Johara Eldeeb, Farida Hussein, Abeer Ramadan and Amina Sobeih, at the African Championships in Kigali, thus earning a quota for the 2024 Olympic Games in Paris.
