= Johara Eldeeb =

Egyptian rhythmic gymnast

- جوهرة الديب
- Full name: Johara Tarek Ahmed Mohamed Eldeeb
- Nickname: Jojo
- Born: 24 May 2007 (age 19) Cairo, Egypt

Gymnastics career
- Discipline: Rhythmic gymnastics
- Country represented: Egypt (2024-)
- Club: Gezira Sporting Club
- Head coaches: Noha Hossam, Mayar Ragab
Medal record
Rhythmic Gymnastics
Representing Egypt
African Championships
Gold medal – first place	2024 Kigali	Group All-Around

Johara Eldeeb (Arabic: جوهرة الديب; born 24 May 2007) is an Egyptian rhythmic gymnast. She is a multiple time African champion.

== Personal life ==
Johara took up rhythmic gymnastics following her older sister Jacinthe, who is a former member of the Egyptian national team and competed at the 2010 Youth Olympic Games in Singapore, winning silver in the group competition.

== Career ==
In 2024 Johara was incorporated into the senior group winning gold in the All-Around, along Lamar Behairi, Farida Hussein, Abeer Ramadan and Amina Sobeih, at the African Championships in Kigali, thus earning a quota for the 2024 Olympic Games in Paris.
