= Luana Gomes =

Angolan rhythmic gymnast (born 2003)

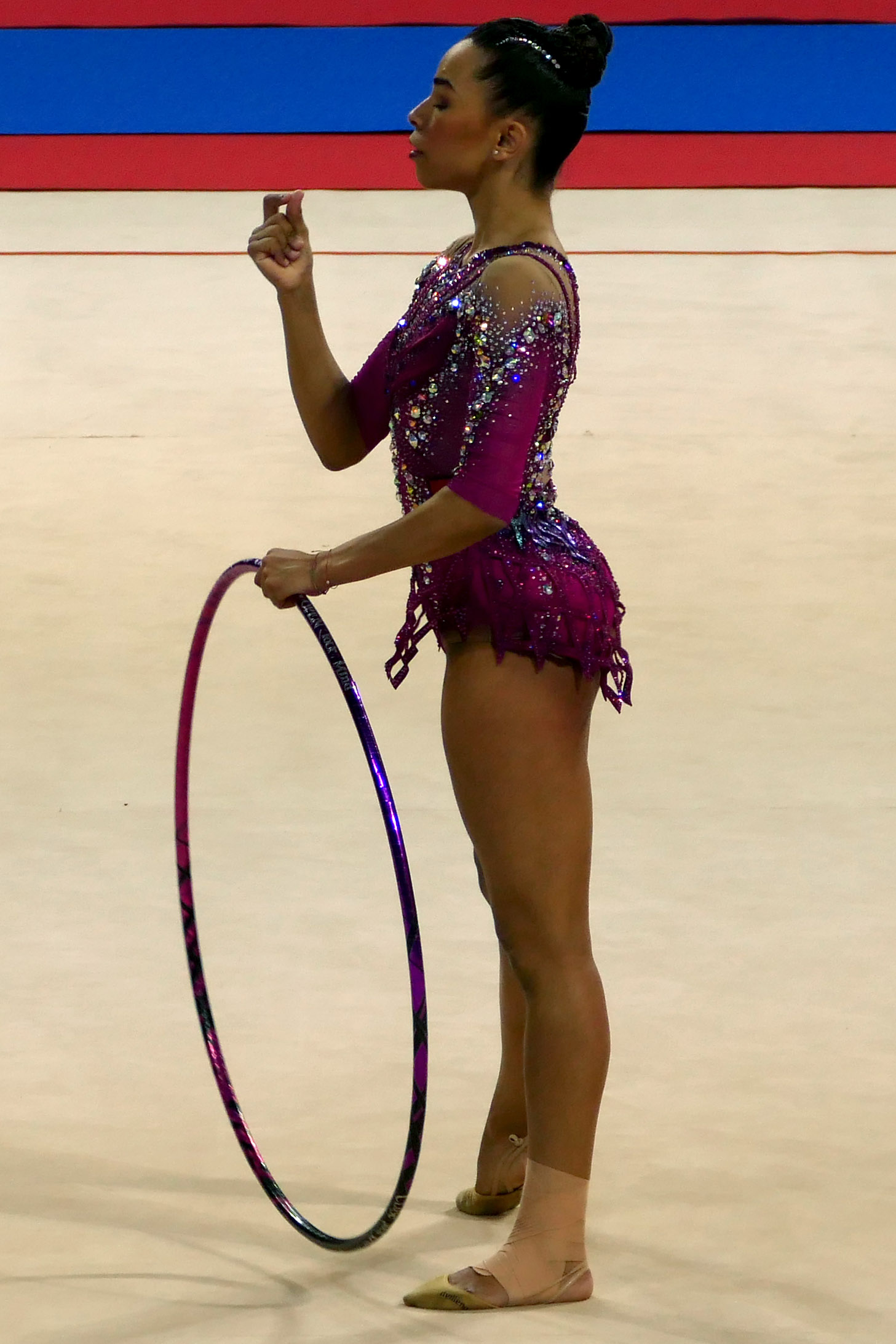
- Gomes in 2024
- Full name: Luana Mercedes Gomes
- Born: 30 January 2003 (age 23) Almada, Portugal

Gymnastics career
- Discipline: Rhythmic gymnastics
- Country represented: Angola (2019-)
- Club: Ivanova Academy-Rhythmic Gymnastics
- Head coach: Renata Filhó
- Former coach: Caterina Ivanova
Medal record
Rhythmic Gymnastics
Representing Angola
African Championships
Gold medal – first place	2023 Moka	Hoop
Gold medal – first place	2023 Moka	Clubs
Gold medal – first place	2024 Kigali	Clubs
Gold medal – first place	2025 Cairo	All-Around
Silver medal – second place	2023 Moka	Ball
Silver medal – second place	2023 Moka	Ribbon
Silver medal – second place	2024 Kigali	All-Around
Silver medal – second place	2024 Kigali	Hoop
Silver medal – second place	2025 Cairo	Ball
Silver medal – second place	2025 Cairo	Club
Silver medal – second place	2025 Cairo	Ribbon
Silver medal – second place	2026 Tshwane	Ribbon
Bronze medal – third place	2020 Sharm El Sheikh	Hoop
Bronze medal – third place	2020 Sharm El Sheikh	Ball
Bronze medal – third place	2020 Sharm El Sheikh	Ribbon
Bronze medal – third place	2022 Cairo	Team
Bronze medal – third place	2022 Cairo	Clubs
Bronze medal – third place	2023 Moka	Team
Bronze medal – third place	2023 Moka	All-Around
Bronze medal – third place	2024 Kigali	Ball
Bronze medal – third place	2024 Kigali	Ribbon
Bronze medal – third place	2025 Cairo	Team
Bronze medal – third place	2026 Tshwane	Team
Bronze medal – third place	2026 Tshwane	Hoop

Luana Gomes (born 30 January 2003) is a Portuguese-Angolan rhythmic gymnast. She is the 2025 African champion.

== Career ==
Gomes debuted at the 2019 World Championships in Baku, ending 42nd in teams, 102nd in the all-around, 105th with hoop, 95th with ball, 125th with clubs and 139th with ribbon.

At the 2020 African Championships in Sharm el-Sheikh, she won bronze with hoop, ball and ribbon. She took 7th place in the all-around.

In 2021, she was the only Angolan representative at the World Championships in Kitakyushu, Japan. She was 60th in the all-around, 61st with hoop, 62nd with ball, 62nd with clubs and 57th with ribbon.

At the 2022 African Championships in Cairo, she won bronze in teams and with clubs. She was 5th in the all-around. In September she was selected for the 2022 World Championships in Sofia, Bulgaria, finishing 71st in the all-around, 77th with hoop, 72nd with ball, 78th with clubs and 55th with ribbon.

She competed at the 2023 World Cup in Sofia where she was 46th in the all-around, 46th with hoop, 45th with ball, 43rd with clubs and 42nd with ribbon. She next competed at the World Cup in Baku, taking 51st place in the all-around, 50th with hoop, 51st with ball, 31st with clubs and 53rd with ribbon. She also competed at the World Challenge Cup in Portimão, being 26th in the all-around, 29th with hoop, 34th with ball, 19th with clubs and 33rd with ribbon.

At the 2023 African Championships in Moka, Mauritius, she won bronze in teams and in the all-around, silver with ball and ribbon and gold with hoop and clubs. In August, she competed at the 2023 World Championships in Valencia, Spain, and she placed 61st in the all-around.

In early 2024, Gomes traveled to Baku for a training camp. In an interview, she mentioned the difficulties of training in Angola due to the lack of equipment and knowledgeable coaches, and she said she planned to become a coach after retiring as an athlete. In April, she competed at the World Cup in Sofia, where she placed 42nd in the all-around.

At the 2024 African Championships in Kigali, she came in second in the all-around. She won four more medals in the apparatus finals: gold in clubs, silver in hoop, and bronze in ball and ribbon.

In 2025, she competed at the World Cup in Sofia, where she took 38th place in the all-around. In May, she became the first Angolan individual gymnast to win gold in the all-around at the 2025 African Championships in Cairo. She also won bronze in the team competition and silver in the ball, clubs and ribbon finals. She represented Angola at the 2025 World Championships in Rio de Janeiro, Brazil.

In March 2026, it was revealed that her former coach Caterina Ivanova was suspended for two years due to abuse. At the Sofia World Cup that month, she took 46th place in the all-around. In early May, she took the bronze medal in the team competition at the 2026 African Championships in Tshwane, South Africa. She also won silver in ribbon and bronze in the hoop final.

== Achievements ==
- First Angolan individual gymnast to win a medal at the African Championships.
- First Angolan individual gymnast to win a gold medal at the African Championships.
- First Angolan individual gymnast to win a gold medal in the All-Around at the African Championships.

== Routine music information ==
Year	Apparatus	Music title
2026	Hoop	We Are Number One (Instrumental) by 4Fate
2026	Ball	Candy land by Loïc Nottet
2026	Clubs	Nyana Wam by Ludwig Göransson, feat. Baaba Maal and Massamba Diop
2026	Ribbon	Who Wants To Live Forever by Queen / Who Wants To Live Forever (Stranger Things Remix)
2025	Hoop	In the Hall of the Mountain King by VoicePlay, Elizabeth Garozzo
2025	Ball	From the Movies by Voca People
2025	Clubs	Yibambe! (from Black Panther: Wakanda Forever) by Ludwig Göransson
2025	Ribbon	Vide Gal by Daniela Mercury
2024	Hoop	Mafia Wars-22926 by Micah Cadis, Andrew Jarod Smith, BMI
2024	Ball	Rikitikitavi by Faraualla
2024	Clubs	Yibambe! (from Black Panther: Wakanda Forever) by Ludwig Göransson
2024	Ribbon	nana triste by Natalia Lacunza, Guitarricadelafuente
