= African Rhythmic Gymnastics Championships =

Rhythmic Gymnastic Championship

The African Rhythmic Gymnastics Championships is a continental sports rhythmic gymnastics competition held every two years from 2000 to 2006, then annually from 2009 and organized by African Gymnastics Association.

== Summary of championships (Senior and Junior) ==
Year	Host City	Date	Venue	No. of Athletes	Lead nation (S)	Lead nation (J)
1990	(Algeria) Algiers	20–26 October	La Coupole			
1992	(Morocco) Casablanca					
1994	(South Africa) Johannesburg	3–8 October	Wembley Indoor Sports Complex			
1998	(Namibia) Walvis Bay	19–24 April				
2000	(Tunisia) Tunis	18–26 November			Egypt	South Africa
2002	(Algeria) Algiers	12–18 October	Hazem Abdelghani Omnisports Hall		South Africa	South Africa
2004	(Senegal) Thiès	10–19 December	Lat-Dior Hall		South Africa	South Africa
2006	(South Africa) Cape Town	21–30 November			South Africa	South Africa
2009	(Egypt) Cairo	29 January–4 February	Cairo Stadium Indoor Halls Complex		South Africa	Egypt
2010	(Namibia) Walvis Bay	7–9 March	Jan Wilken Indoor Sports Complex		Egypt	
2012	(South Africa) Pretoria	7–14 December	Rembrandt Hall, University of Pretoria		Egypt	Egypt
2014	(South Africa) Pretoria	27 March–1 April	Rembrandt Hall, University of Pretoria		South Africa	Egypt
2016	(Namibia) Walvis Bay	28 August–3 September	Jan Wilken Indoor Sports Complex		South Africa	Egypt
2018	(Egypt) Cairo	26–28 April	Cairo Stadium Indoor Halls Complex		Egypt	Egypt
2020	(Egypt) Sharm El Sheikh	10–15 March			Egypt	
2022	(Egypt) Cairo	10–15 May	Sports Development Center		Egypt	Egypt
2023	(Mauritius) Moka	19–20 May	Côte d'Or National Sports Complex		Egypt	
2024	(Rwanda) Kigali	25–26 April	Amahoro Stadium Hall		Egypt	Egypt
2025	(Egypt) Cairo	2–3 May	Cairo Stadium Indoor Halls Complex		Egypt	
2026	(South Africa) Tshwane	30 April–2 May	Heartfelt Arena		Egypt	Egypt

== All-time medal table ==
2000–2026
Rank	Nation	Gold	Silver	Bronze	Total
1	Egypt (EGY)	117	73	27	217
2	South Africa (RSA)	35	50	54	139
3	Angola (ANG)	5	9	17	31
4	Cape Verde (CPV)	1	3	4	8
5	Tunisia (TUN)	0	6	19	25
6	Morocco (MAR)	0	0	6	6
7	Algeria (ALG)	0	0	3	3
7	Namibia (NAM)	0	0	3	3
7	Zimbabwe (ZIM)	0	0	3	3
Totals (9 entries)		158	141	136	435

Note
Complete results of the 2006 are not currently available. The results for 2004 and 2009 are incomplete.

== See also ==
- African Artistic Gymnastics Championships
- African Trampoline Championships
