= Dewan (surname) =

Dewan is a surname. Notable people with the surname include:

- Azra Dewan (born 2003), South African rhythmic gymnast
- Barun Bikash Dewan (born 1969), Bangladeshi retired footballer
- Bhim Bahadur Dewan (1961–1999), Indian soldier killed in action
- Binoy Kumar Dewan (1925–2021), Bangladeshi politician
- Hari Chand Dewan (1921–2017), Indian air marshal
- Iffat Ara Dewan, Bangladeshi singer and painter
- Jenna Dewan (born 1980), American actress and dancer
- Kamini Mohan Dewan (1890–1976), Bangladeshi politician
- Karan Dewan (1917–1979), Indian actor in Hindi films, born Dewan Karan Chopra
- Krishan Dev Dewan, Indian social worker and activist
- Leon Dewan, American artist, inventor and musician
- Leslie Dewan (born 1984), American nuclear engineer, co-founder and chief executive officer of Transatomic Power
- Meera Dewan, Indian documentary filmmaker and columnist
- Moni Swapan Dewan (born 1954), Bangladeshi politician
- Nirupa Dewan, Bangladeshi human rights activist
- Parvez Dewan, Indian former administrator, author and librettist
- Patrick Michael Dewan (1890–1988), Canadian politician
- Rahul Dewan (born 1986), Indian cricketer
- Ramesh Dewan (born 1938), Indian former cricketer
- Saba Dewan, Indian documentary film maker
- Subimal Dewan (died 2009), Bangladeshi social worker, development worker and politician
- Sudipta Dewan (died 2015), Bangladeshi politician
- Ted Dewan, American-born British writer and illustrator of children's books
- Tikendra Dal Dewan (born 1953), retired British Army Gurkha major and activist for the rights of British Gurkhas
