= 2016 African Rhythmic Gymnastics Championships =

2016 African Gymnastics Championships
- Venue: Sports Complex
- Location: Walvis Bay, Namibia
- Start date: 28 August 2016
- End date: 3 September 2016

The 2016 African Rhythmic Gymnastics Championships were held from 28 August to 3 September 2016 in Walvis Bay, Namibia.

The championships were held along the African Championships of trampoline and tumbling.

== Medal winners ==
Games	Gold	Silver	Bronze
Seniors
Teams	Egypt; Haya Zayed; Laila Selim; Nour Khalil; Nourhal Khattab	South Africa; Chris-Marie Van Wyk; Grace Legote; Palesa Mohlamme; Shannon Gardiner	Namibia; Maria Gawises; Rolize-Marie Kirsten; Timiica Van Wyk; Trusty Kavezuva
All-Around	Grace Legote (RSA)	Haya Zayed (EGY)	Laila Selim (EGY)
Hoop	Grace Legote (RSA)	Haya Zayed (EGY)	Palesa Mohlamme (RSA)
Ball	Grace Legote (RSA)	Palesa Mohlamme (RSA)	Nour Khalil (EGY)
Clubs	Grace Legote (RSA)	Haya Zayed (EGY)	Laila Selim (EGY)
Ribbon	Grace Legote (RSA)	Haya Zayed (EGY)	Laila Selim (EGY)
Juniors
Teams	Egypt; Habiba Marzouk; Mariam Selim; Maria Atef; Shada Ahmed	South Africa; Chandre Wild; Erin Wakefield; Karlin Van Tonder; Lilica Burger	Namibia; Allison Duvenhage; Clara Reyero; Sina Gawises
All-Around	Mariam Selim (EGY)	Habiba Marzouk (EGY)	Lilica Burger (RSA)
Rope	Mariam Selim (EGY)	Habiba Marzouk (EGY)	Lilica Burger (RSA)
Hoop	Mariam Selim (EGY)	Habiba Marzouk (EGY)	Lilica Burger (RSA)
Ball	Mariam Selim (EGY)	Habiba Marzouk (EGY)	Lilica Burger (RSA)
Clubs	Mariam Selim (EGY)	Chandre Wild (RSA)	Lilica Burger (RSA)
Groups
5 ballons + 5 cerceaux	Egypt; Tia Sobhy; Salma Saleh; Nermin Elshalakamy; Malak Selim; Farida Khedr	South Africa; Michelle-Alexandre Damon; Joane Van der Merwe; Elminda Van der Merwe; Kirthi Juglal; Nikhishah Ramesh	Zimbabwe; Kiora Joseph; Sangiwe Mpofu; Tayedza Chikumbirike; Georgie Sampson; Tsitsi Nyamutswa; Channel Hencil
5 ballons	Egypt; Tia Sobhy; Salma Saleh; Nermin Elshalakamy; Malak Selim; Farida Khedr	South Africa; Michelle-Alexandre Damon; Joane Van der Merwe; Elminda Van der Merwe; Kirthi Juglal; Nikhishah Ramesh	Zimbabwe; Kiora Joseph; Sangiwe Mpofu; Tayedza Chikumbirike; Georgie Sampson; Tsitsi Nyamutswa; Channel Hencil
5 cerceaux	Egypt; Tia Sobhy; Salma Saleh; Nermin Elshalakamy; Malak Selim; Farida Khedr	South Africa; Michelle-Alexandre Damon; Joane Van der Merwe; Elminda Van der Merwe; Kirthi Juglal; Nikhishah Ramesh	Zimbabwe; Kiora Joseph; Sangiwe Mpofu; Tayedza Chikumbirike; Georgie Sampson; Tsitsi Nyamutswa; Channel Hencil
