= Sibongile Mjekula =

South African rhythmic gymnast

- Born: 2 February 1991 (age 35) South Africa

Gymnastics career
- Discipline: Rhythmic gymnastics
- Country represented: South Africa; (2004-2010)
- Head coach: Tatiana Lavrentchouk-Vizer
- Retired: yes
Medal record
Representing South Africa
Rhythmic gymnastics
African Gymnastics Championships
Gold medal – first place	2004 Thiès	All-Around
Gold medal – first place	2004 Thiès	Rope
Gold medal – first place	2004 Thiès	Ball
Gold medal – first place	2004 Thiès	Clubs
Gold medal – first place	2004 Thiès	Ribbon
Gold medal – first place	2009 Cairo	All-Around
Bronze medal – third place	2010 Walvis Bay	Hoop

Sibongile Mjekula (born 2 February 1991) is a former South African rhythmic gymnast. She represented her country in international competitions.

== Career ==
At the 2004 African Rhythmic Gymnastics Championships in Thiès, she won the gold medal in the junior category in the All-Around and with rope, ball, clubs and ribbon. Mjekula was the 2005 and 2006 junior champion and won a gold medal at the 2005 Arafura Games in Australia. In 2007 she participated in her first World Championship in Patras where she was 26th in the team category with Odette Richard and Stephanie Sandler.

At the 2009 African Championships she won gold in the All-Around. In autumn at the World Championships in Mie, South Africa was 32nd in the team competition along with Julene Van Rooyen, Yvonne Garland and Grace Legote, she finished 110th in the All-Around. In October she competed at the Commonwealth Games in Delhi, finished in 8th place in the All-Around final.

In 2010 she was again selected for the African Championship where she won bronze in the hoop final. Mjekula also took part in the World Championships in Moscow, where she was 35th in the team competition with Julene Van Rooyen and Grace Legote, and she was 93rd in the All-Around.
