= 2014 African Rhythmic Gymnastics Championships =

2014 African Gymnastics Championships
- Venue: Rembrandt Hall, University of Pretoria
- Location: Pretoria, South Africa
- Start date: 24 March 2014
- End date: 1 April 2014

The 2014 African Rhythmic Gymnastics Championships took place from 24 March to 1 April 2014 in Pretoria, South Africa. The Rembrandt Hall at the University of Pretoria Sports Center hosted the event.

== Medal winners ==
=== Senior ===
| Games | Gold | Silver | Bronze |
|---|---|---|---|
| Team | South Africa; Aimee van Rooyen; Grace Legote; Julene Van Rooyen; Gugulethu Nkambule | Egypt; Sara Rostom; Fatma Magdi; Nourhal Khattab; Asma Adawy | Tunisia; Amina Chtiba; Maisa Ghazouani |
| All-Around | Grace Legote (RSA) | Sara Rostom (EGY) | Aimee Van Rooyen (RSA) |
| Hoop | Sara Rostom (EGY) | Grace Legote (RSA) | Julene Van Rooyen (RSA) |
| Ball | Grace Legote (RSA) | Julene Van Rooyen (RSA) | Fatma Magdi (EGY) |
| Clubs | Grace Legote (RSA) | Sara Rostom (EGY) | Fatma Magdi (EGY) |
| Ribbon | Grace Legote (RSA) | Sara Rostom (EGY) | Fatma Magdi (EGY) |
Senior Group
| All-Around | Egypt; Aisha Elkolali; Alia Elkatib; Jacinthe Eldeeb; Malak Mostafa; Sarah Elkattan; Yara Baraka | South Africa; Amy Cooper; Kayleigh Slaughter; Michelle Harpur; Paige Snyders; Palesa Shabalala; Taryn Christie-Taylor | Angola; Alice Tomas; Beniude Panguleipo; Jandira Henriques; Margarida Cabral; Nkumba Francisco; Sofia Higino; Yolanda Gaspar |

=== Junior ===
| Games | Gold | Silver | Bronze |
|---|---|---|---|
| Teams | Egypt; Hana Hassan; Haya Hisham; Layla Selim; Nour Abdel Aziz | South Africa; Alexia Bazzo; Chris-Marie van Wyk; Palesa Mohlamme; Shannon Gardiner | Morocco; Sofia Moussaoui; Basma Ouatay |
| All-Around | Hana Hassan (EGY) | Shannon Gardiner (RSA) | Layla Selim (EGY) |
| Hoop | Hana Hassan (EGY) | Shannon Gardiner (RSA) | Haya Hisham (EGY) |
| Ball | Hana Hassan (EGY) | Layla Selim (EGY) | Shannon Gardiner (RSA) |
| Clubs | Nour Abdel Aziz (EGY) | Alexia Bazzo (RSA) | Hana Hassan (EGY) |
| Ribbon | Hana Hassan (EGY) | Layla Selim (EGY) | Chris-Marie van Wyk (RSA) |
Junior Groups
| All-Around | Egypt; Hania Khattab; Mariam Abdelhamid; Nadin Gaber; Sara Ibrahim; Sherifa Bayoumy; Zain Saad | Angola; Alexandra Paulo; Biatriz Kasselo; Eunice Ferreira; Iolanda Antonio; Monica Gaspar | |
