= Sofia Moussaoui =

Moroccan individual rhythmic gymnast (born 2001)

- Born: 8 November 2001 (age 24) Moscow, Russia

Gymnastics career
- Discipline: Rhythmic gymnastics
- Country represented: Morocco; (204-2019)
- Club: Mediterranean Martel Club
- Retired: yes
Medal record
Rhythmic gymnastics
Representing Morocco
African Gymnastics Championships
Bronze medal – third place	2020 Cairo	Team
Junior African Championships
Bronze medal – third place	2014 Pretoria	Team

Sofia Moussaoui (Arabic: صوفيا الموساوي, romanized: Ṣūfiyā al-Mūsāwī; born 8 November 2001) is a retired Moroccan rhythmic gymnast. She represented Morocco in international competitions.

== Career ==
As a junior, at the 2014 African Championships in Pretoria Moussaoui was 10th in the All-Around, 6th with hoop, 7th with ball and won bronze in teams along Basma Ouatay.

She became age eligible for senior competitions in 2017. Participating in the 2018 African Championships in Cairo, she was 10th in the All-Around, 7th with hoop, 5th with ball, 5th with clubs, 5th with ribbon and 4th in teams. At the Arab Gymnastics Championships in Marrakesh she won gold in teams.

In 2020 she was selected for the African Championships in Sharm el-Sheikh, being 10th overall, 6th with hoop, 7th with ball, 5th with clubs, 6th with ribbon and won bronze in teams with Myriam Aranda Harandou and Dikra El Idrissi Dafali.

After her retirement from the sport she started to work as a fitness and rhythmic gymnastics coach in her native Russia.
