= Rangamati =

Rangamati Hill Tracts
- City
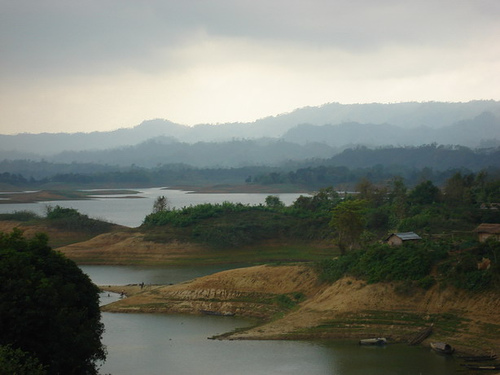

- Location in Chittagong Division Location in Bangladesh
- Coordinates: 22°38′N 92°12′E
- Division: Chattogram Division

Government
  - Incumbent: Vacant
  - Mayor: Akbar Hossain Chowdhury (Resigned)
  - Ruling Party: Currently following lead under the Interim Government

Area
  - Total: 21 km^{2} (8.1 sq mi)
- Elevation: 14 m (46 ft)

Population (2022)
  - Total: 648,219
- Time zone: UTC+6 (BST)
- Postal Code: 4500
- Area code: 0351
- Climate: Am

Rangamati Municipality mahallah geocode map

Rangamati (Bengali: রাঙামাটি, lit. 'Red Soil'; Bengali pronunciation: [raŋamati]) is a city and the administrative headquarters of Rangamati District in the Chittagong Hill Tracts of Bangladesh. The city is located at 22°37'60N 92°12'0E and has an elevation of 14 metres (46 ft) above sea level.

== Demographics ==
According to the 2022 Bangladesh census, Rangamati had a population of 521,394 and a literacy rate of 85.62%.

According to the 2011 Bangladesh census, Rangamati had 18,355 households and a population of 675,269 . 471,492 (18.61%) were under 10 years of age. Rangamati had a literacy rate (age 7 and over) of 73.13%, compared to the national average of 51.8%, and a sex ratio of 870 females per 1000 males.

=== Religion ===
Religions in Rangamati town (2022)
Religion	Percent
Islam	52.17%
Buddhism	34.32%
Hinduism	13.07%
Christianity	0.44%

Population by religion in wards under municipality
Ward No	Islam	Buddhism	Hinduism	Others
Ward-1	5,816	276	2,690	1
Ward-2	9,009	458	1,423	28
Ward-3	3,624	2,063	1,817	104
Ward-4	7,970	574	795	18
Ward-5	3,560	3,138	1,615	141
Ward-6	6,410	7,628	1,011	103
Ward-7	9,024	3,209	1,637	23
Ward-8	4,500	11,176	1,973	92
Ward-9	5,360	7,840	884	70

=== Ethnicity ===
Ethnicity-2022
1. Bengalis (67.6%)
2. Chakma (27.7%)
3. Marma (1.64%)
4. Tanchangya (1.14%)
5. Others (1.92%)

Population by ethnicity in wards under municipality
Ward No	Bengali	Chakma	Others
Ward-1	8,516	98	169
Ward-2	10,487	264	174
Ward-3	5,484	1,511	613
Ward-4	8,870	396	92
Ward-5	5,293	1,537	1,624
Ward-6	8,697	5,920	535
Ward-7	10,532	2,597	764
Ward-8	7,382	9,628	731
Ward-9	6,489	7,383	283

== Tourist attractions ==
Rangamati is surrounded by natural features such as mountains, rivers, lakes, and waterfalls. Rangamati is also home to several ethnic groups. Some of the most popular attractions are:

- Rajban Vihar
- Sajek Valley
  - Konglak Haphong
- Kaptai Lake

== Climate ==
Climate data for Rangamati
Month	Jan	Feb	Mar	Apr	May	Jun	Jul	Aug	Sep	Oct	Nov	Dec	Year
Mean daily maximum °C (°F)	18.7 (65.7)	25.5 (77.9)	32.0 (89.6)	33.0 (91.4)	32.7 (90.9)	31.2 (88.2)	30.5 (86.9)	31.0 (87.8)	31.5 (88.7)	31.4 (88.5)	29.1 (84.4)	26.2 (79.2)	30.2 (86.4)
Mean daily minimum °C (°F)	6.3 (43.3)	9.2 (48.6)	20.0 (68.0)	22.9 (73.2)	24.0 (75.2)	24.9 (76.8)	24.8 (76.6)	24.9 (76.8)	24.8 (76.6)	19.9 (67.8)	14.6 (58.3)	12.3 (54.1)	13.4 (56.1)
Average precipitation mm (inches)	5.1 (0.20)	24.3 (0.96)	62.1 (2.44)	147.9 (5.82)	319.7 (12.59)	504.8 (19.87)	572.6 (22.54)	435.2 (17.13)	259.6 (10.22)	152.2 (5.99)	55.7 (2.19)	9.5 (0.37)	2,548.7 (100.34)
Average precipitation days	1	2	3	8	13	18	21	20	15	8	4	1	114
Average relative humidity (%)	77	69	67	72	78	84	85	85	85	84	82	81	79
Source: Bangladesh Meteorological Department

== Notable people ==
- Parijat Kusum Chakma
- Aung Shwe Prue Chowdhury
- Binoy Kumar Dewan
- Kamini Mohan Dewan
- Moni Swapan Dewan
- Subimal Dewan, advisor on Chittagong Hill Tracts affairs to President Ziaur Rahman, died in the College Gate area in 2009.
- Santu Larma
- Manabendra Narayan Larma
- Chaithoai Roaza
- Dipankar Talukdar
- Ushatan Talukder
- Shobha Rani Tripura

== Gallery ==
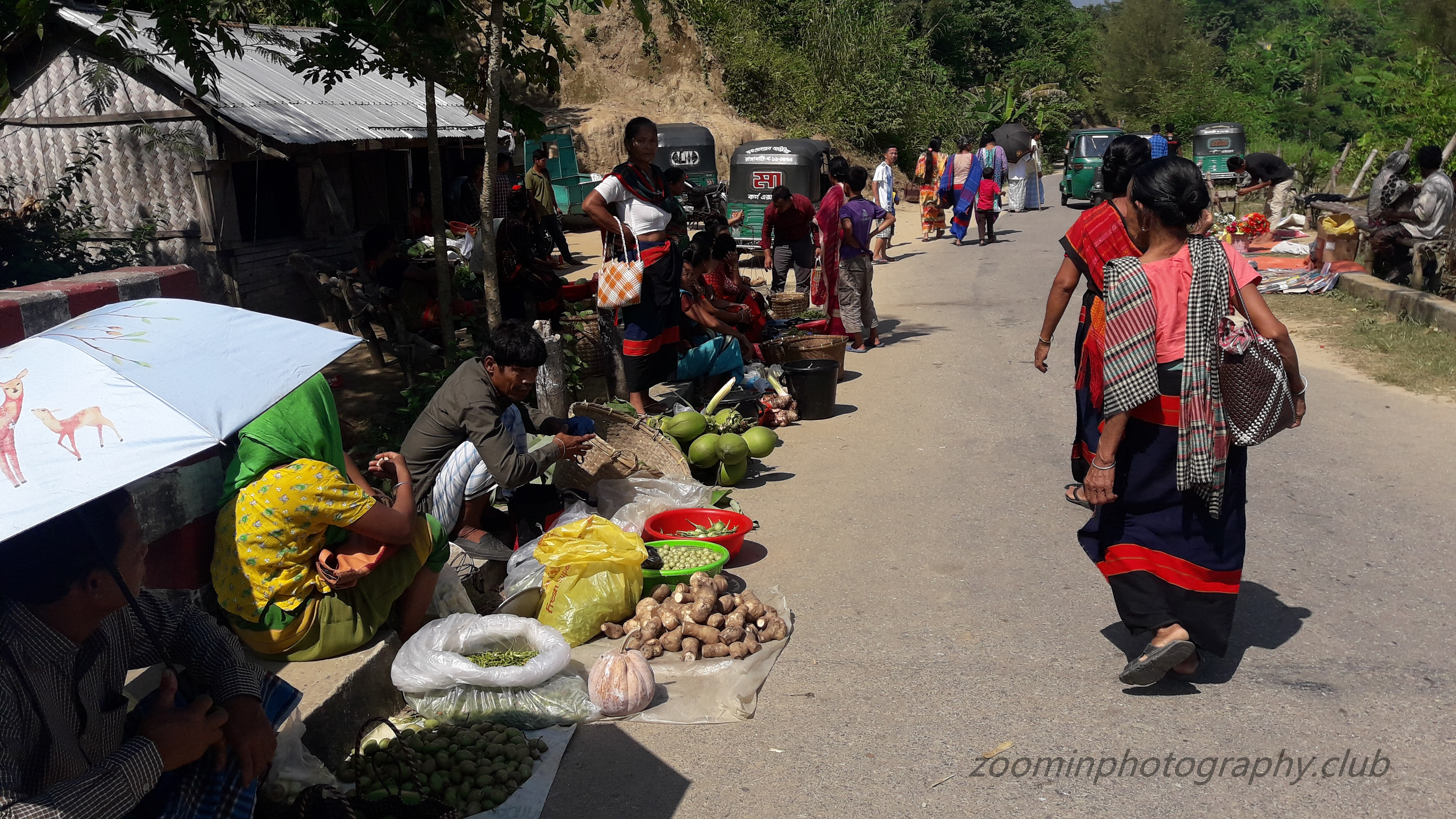
Rangamati-Kaptai Highway, Rangamati

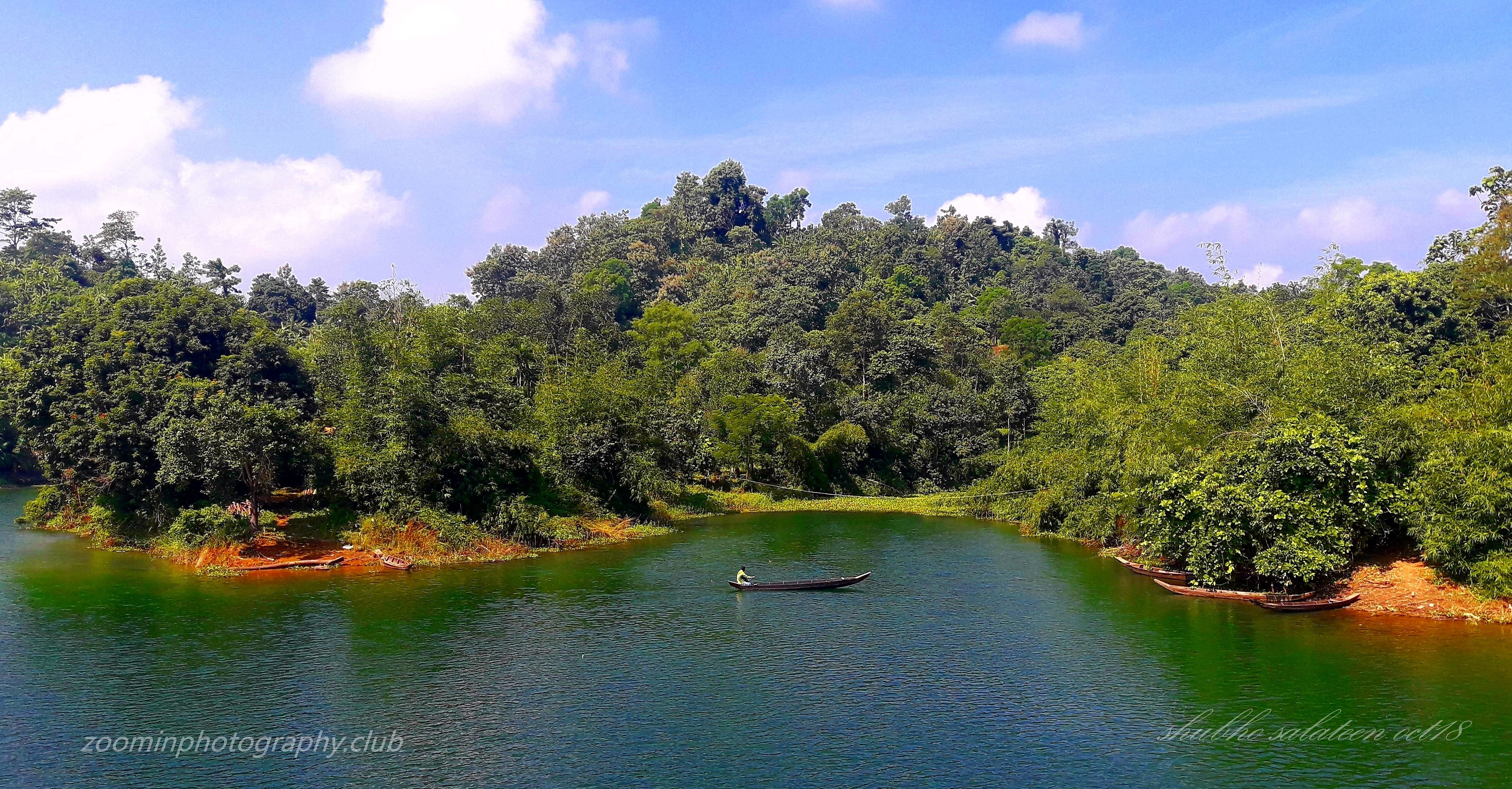
Rangamati, Lake Kaptai

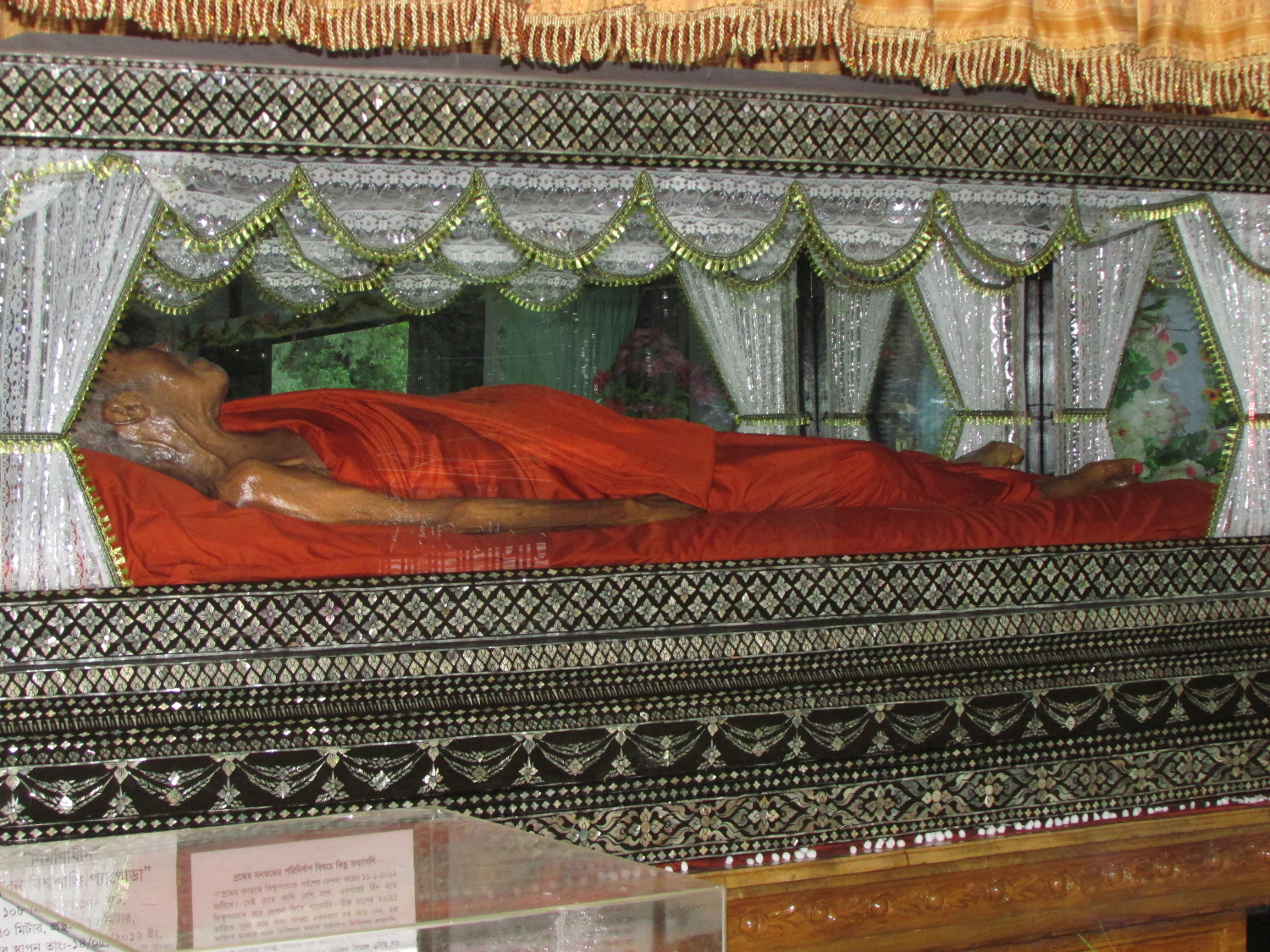
Mummified Body of the Top Mohanto at Rajbana Vihara

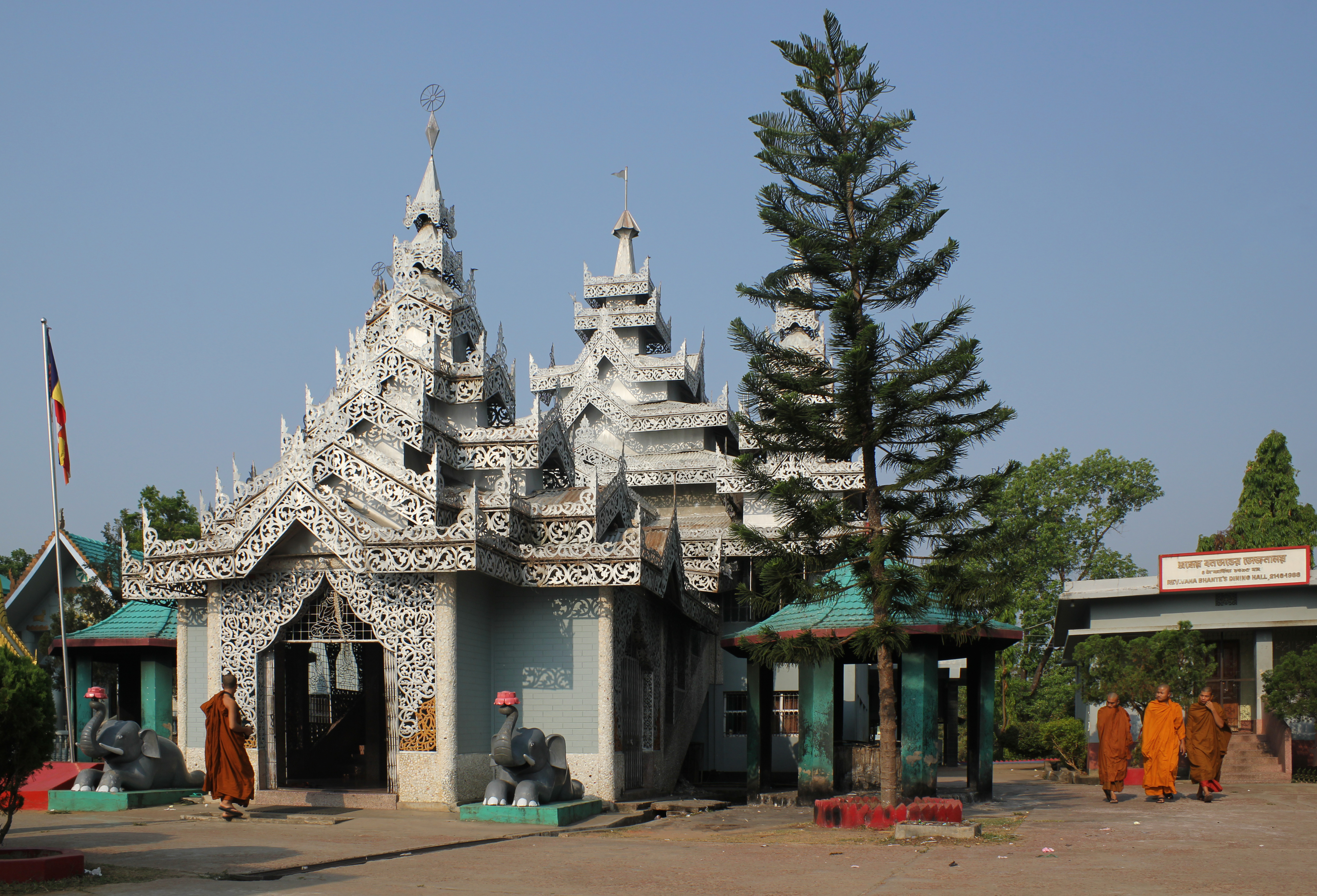
Rajbana Vihara, a renowned Buddhist Temple at Rangamati

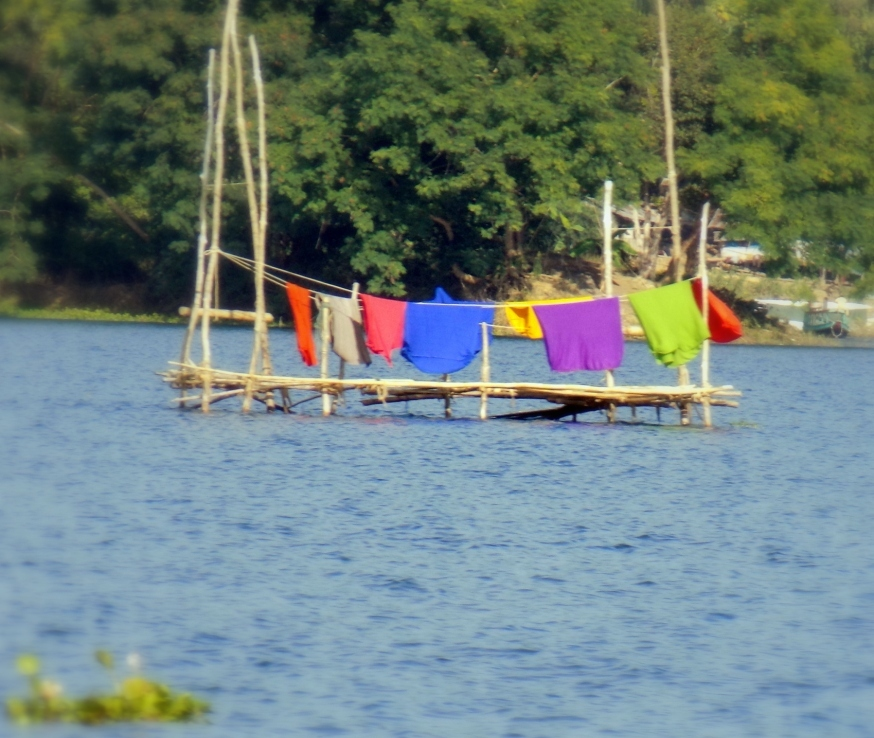
Life in Water

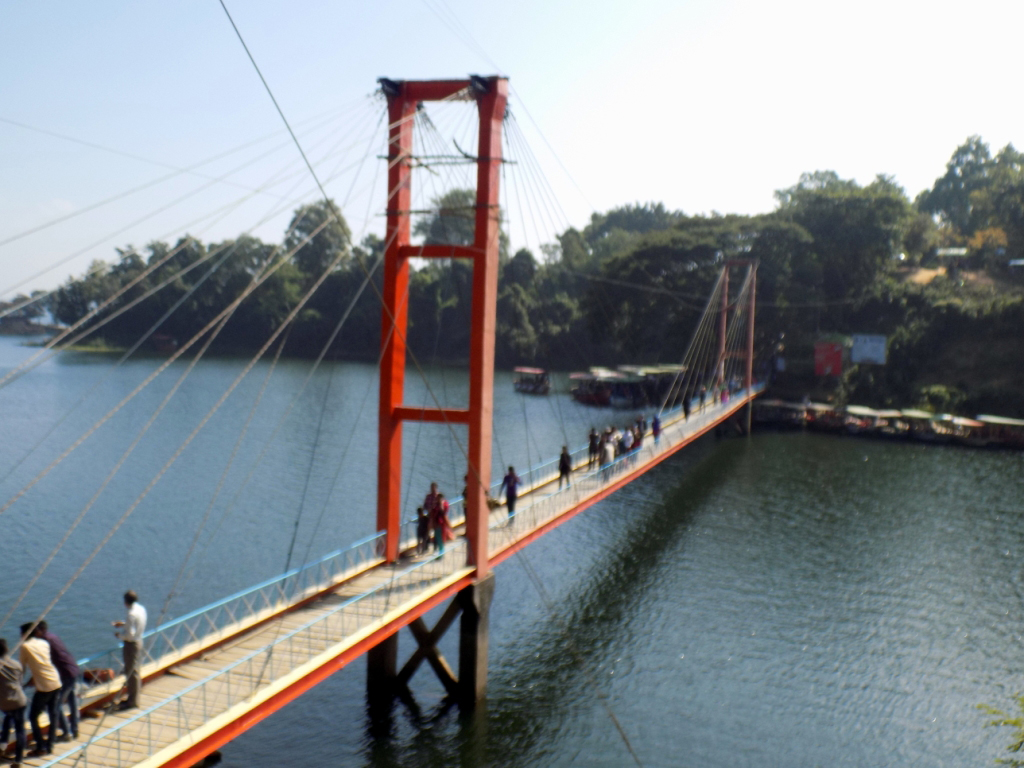
Hanging bridge of Rangamati
