= 2018 African Rhythmic Gymnastics Championships =

2018 African Gymnastics Championships
- Venue: Cairo International Stadium
- Location: Cairo, Egypt
- Start date: 26 April 2018
- End date: 28 April 2018

The 2018 African Rhythmic Gymnastics Championships also known as The 14th African Championships was held from 26 to 28 April 2018 in Cairo, Egypt.

== Medal winners ==
Event	Gold	Silver	Bronze
Senior Individuals
All-Around	Habiba Marzouk (EGY)	Mariam Selim (EGY)	Haya Zayed Hisham (EGY)
Team	Egypt; Mariam Selim; Habiba Marzouk; Haya Zayed Hisham; Nourhal Khattab	South Africa; Shannon Gardiner; Grace Legote; Lilica Burger; Chris-Marie Van Wyk	Tunisia; Maisa Ghazouani; Senda Hammami; Minyar Jerbi; Manel Gharbi
Hoop	Mariam Selim (EGY)	Grace Legote (RSA)	Habiba Marzouk (EGY)
Ball	Mariam Selim (EGY)	Habiba Marzouk (EGY)	Grace Legote (RSA)
Clubs	Grace Legote (RSA)	Haya Zayed Hisham (EGY)	Habiba Marzouk (EGY)
Ribbon	Mariam Selim (EGY)	Habiba Marzouk (EGY)	Grace Legote (RSA)
Juniopr Groups
All-Around	Egypt; Salma Saleh; Farida Khedr Nasser; Malak Selim; Perihan Abdelmenim Ayman; Nermin Elshalakamy Khaled; Farah Abdelsayed Ehab	South Africa; Carmen Jooste; Kerryn Cowper; Daniele Van der Merwe; Morongoa Mokholoane; Hannah Cawood	Angola; Evaudina Madalena Campos Severino; Florencia Nonjamba Missende; Adriana Uraca Chivindica; Marizete Canaca Tavares; Joana Zumara Domingos
5 Ropes	Egypt; Salma Saleh; Farida Khedr Nasser; Malak Selim; Perihan Abdelmenim Ayman; Nermin Elshalakamy Khaled; Farah Abdelsayed Ehab	South Africa; Carmen Jooste; Kerryn Cowper; Daniele Van der Merwe; Morongoa Mokholoane; Hannah Cawood	Angola; Evaudina Madalena Campos Severino; Florencia Nonjamba Missende; Adriana Uraca Chivindica; Marizete Canaca Tavares; Joana Zumara Domingos
5 Clubs	Egypt; Salma Saleh; Farida Khedr Nasser; Malak Selim; Perihan Abdelmenim Ayman; Nermin Elshalakamy Khaled; Farah Abdelsayed Ehab	South Africa; Carmen Jooste; Kerryn Cowper; Daniele Van der Merwe; Morongoa Mokholoane; Hannah Cawood	Angola; Evaudina Madalena Campos Severino; Florencia Nonjamba Missende; Adriana Uraca Chivindica; Marizete Canaca Tavares; Joana Zumara Domingos

== Medal count ==
Rank	Nation	Gold	Silver	Bronze	Total
1	Egypt	8	4	3	15
2	South Africa	1	5	2	8
3	Angola	0	0	3	3
4	Tunisia	0	0	1	1
Totals (4 entries)		9	9	9	27
