= 2009 African Rhythmic Gymnastics Championships =

2009 African Gymnastics Championships
- Venue: Cairo international Stadium
- Location: Cairo, Egypt
- Start date: 29 January 2009
- End date: 4 February 2009

The 2009 African Rhythmic Gymnastics Championships were held from 29 January to 5 February 2009 in Cairo, Egypt.

The competition was held along the 2009 African Artistic Gymnastics Championships.

== Medal winners ==
Games	Gold	Silver	Bronze
Senior individuals
All-Around	Sibongile Mjekula (RSA)	Stephanie Sandler (RSA)	Grace Legote (RSA)
Junior individuals
All-Around	Heba Khaled El Bourini (EGY)	Yasmine Rostom (EGY)	Gasenthe Tarek El Deep (EGY)
