= 2012 African Rhythmic Gymnastics Championships =

2012 African Gymnastics Championships
- Venue: Rembrandt Hall, University of Pretoria
- Location: Pretoria, South Africa
- Start date: 7 December 2012
- End date: 14 December 2012

The 2012 African Rhythmic Gymnastics Championships took place from December 7 to December 14, 2012, in Pretoria, South Africa. The Rembrandt Hall at the University of Pretoria Sports Center hosted the event.

== Medal winners ==
=== Senior ===
Games	Gold	Silver	Bronze
Team	Egypt; Jacinthe Tarek Aldeeb; Aisha Hany Elklali; Sara Rostom; Yasmine Rostom	South Africa; Grace Legote; Gululethu Nkambule; Julene Van Rooyen; Aimee Van Rooyen	Tunisia; Maisa Ghazouani; Lilia Kamoun; Inès Lakech
All-Around	Yasmine Rostom (EGY)	Sara Rostom (EGY)	Grace Legote (RSA)
Hoop	Sara Rostom (EGY)	Aimee Van Rooyen (RSA)	Grace Legote (RSA)
Ball	Yasmine Rostom (EGY)	Sara Rostom (EGY)	Grace Legote (RSA)
Clubs	Yasmine Rostom (EGY)	Sara Rostom (EGY)	Aimee Van Rooyen (RSA)
Ribbon	Yasmine Rostom (EGY)	Grace Legote (RSA)	Aimee Van Rooyen (RSA)
Senior Group
All-Around	Angola		

=== Junior ===
Games	Gold	Silver	Bronze
Teams	Egypt; Asmaa Adawy; Mayada Elghoneimy; Nourhal Khattab; Fatma Salman	South Africa; Shannon Gardiner; Amy Marais; Botle Mosupa; Kathleen Videira	Tunisia; Amina Chtiba; Amani El Kefi; Nasfi Ichrak
All-Around	Asmaa Adawy (EGY)	Mayada Elghoneimy (EGY)	Nourhal Hatem Khattab (EGY)
Hoop	Fatma Salman (EGY)	Asmaa Adawy (EGY)	Amy Marais (RSA)
Ball	Mayada Elghoneimy (EGY)	Shannon Gardiner (RSA)	Amani El Kefi (TUN)
Clubs	Nourhal Hatem Khattab (EGY)	Asmaa Adawy (EGY)	Amy Marais (RSA)
Ribbon	Asmaa Adawy (EGY)	Mayada Elghoneimy (EGY)	Shannon Gardiner (RSA)
Junior Groups
All-Around	Egypt	South Africa	
