= Rangamati (Jatiya Sangsad constituency) =

Constituency of Bangladesh's Jatiya Sangsad

Coordinates: 22.6630°N 92.1579°E

- Constituency for the Jatiya Sangsad
- District: Rangamati Hill District
- Division: Chittagong Division
- Electorate: 474,354 (2024)

Current constituency
- Created: 1984
- Party: Bangladesh Nationalist Party
- Member: Dipen Dewan
- ← 298 Khagrachari 300 Bandarban →

Rangamati is a constituency represented in the Jatiya Sangsad (National Parliament) of Bangladesh since 2026 by Dipen Dewan of the Bangladesh Nationalist Party.

== Boundaries ==
The constituency encompasses Rangamati Hill District.

== Members of Parliament ==
Election	Member	Party
1986	Binoy Kumar Dewan	Jatiya Party (Ershad)
1991	Dipankar Talukdar	Bangladesh Awami League
Feb 1996	Parijat Kusum Chakma	Bangladesh Nationalist Party
Jun 1996	Dipankar Talukdar	Bangladesh Awami League
2001	Moni Swapan Dewan	Bangladesh Nationalist Party
2008	Dipankar Talukdar	Bangladesh Awami League
2014	Ushatan Talukder	Independent
2018	Dipankar Talukdar	Bangladesh Awami League
2024	Dipankar Talukdar	Bangladesh Awami League
2026	Dipen Dewan	Bangladesh Nationalist Party

== Elections ==
=== Elections in the 2010s ===
General Election 2018: Rangamati
Party	Candidate	Votes	%	±%
AL	Dipankar Talukdar	156,844	55.46	N/A
Independent	Ushatan Talukder	94,495	33.40	N/A
BNP	Moni Swapan Dewan	31,017	10.97	N/A
JP(E)	Mk Parvez Talukdar	470	0.17	N/A
Majority		62,349	22.06	
Turnout		282,826	67.63	
Registered electors		418,217		
AL gain from Independent				
