= Lilica Burger =

South African rhythmic gymnast (born 2002)

- Born: 31 October 2002 (age 23)

Gymnastics career
- Discipline: Rhythmic gymnastics
- Country represented: South Africa; (2016–2020)
- Club: KSG Potchefstroom Rhythmic Gymnastics
- Head coach: Tatiana Lavrenchuk-Vizer
Medal record
Rhythmic Gymnastics
Representing South Africa
African Championships
Silver medal – second place	2018 Cairo	Team
Silver medal – second place	2020 Sharm el-Sheikh	Team
Bronze medal – third place	2020 Sharm el-Sheikh	All-Around
Bronze medal – third place	2020 Sharm el-Sheikh	Clubs
Junior African Championships
Silver medal – second place	2016 Walvis Bay	Team
Bronze medal – third place	2016 Walvis Bay	All-Around
Bronze medal – third place	2016 Walvis Bay	Hoop
Bronze medal – third place	2016 Walvis Bay	Ball
Bronze medal – third place	2016 Walvis Bay	Clubs
Bronze medal – third place	2016 Walvis Bay	Ribbon

Lilica Burger (born 31 October 2002) is a retired South African rhythmic gymnast. She represented South Africa in international competitions.

== Career ==
=== Junior ===
At the 2016 African Championships Burger won silver in teams (along Chandre Wild, Erin Wakefield and Karlin Van Tonder) and bronze in the All-Around and all the event finals. In October 2017 she participated in the Aeon Cup in Tokyo, being 15th among junior gymnasts.

=== Senior ===
She became age eligible for senior competitions in 2018, debuting at the African Championships in Cairo where she won silver in teams alongside Shannon Gardiner, Grace Legote and Chris-Marie Van Wyk. In September she was selected for her maiden World Championships in Sofia, being 127th with hoop, 116th with ball and 97th with clubs.

In August 2019 she took part in the World Cup in Kazan, being 50th in the All-Around. A month later she competed at the World Championships in Baku, taking 86th place in the All-Around, 78th with hoop, 88th with ball, 104th with clubs, 111th with ribbon and 38th in teams (with Azra Dewan and Shannon Gardiner).

In March 2020, before the season was cut short because of the COVID-19 pandemic, she won bronze in the All-Around and with clubs as well as silver in teams, with Azra Dewan, Shannon Gardiner and Erin Wakefield, at the African Championships.
