= 2010 African Rhythmic Gymnastics Championships =

2010 African Gymnastics Championships
- Venue: Jan Wilken Sport Complex
- Location: Walvis Bay, Namibia
- Start date: 7 March 2010
- End date: 9 March 2010

The 2010 African Rhythmic Gymnastics Championships also known as The 5th African Championships were held from 7 to 9 March 2010 in Walvis Bay, Namibia.

The competition was held in conjunction with the 2010 African Artistic Gymnastics Championships, the 2010 African Trampoline Championships and the 2010 African Aerobic Gymnastics Championships.

== Medal winners ==
Games	Gold	Silver	Bronze
Senior Individuals
Rope	Mariz Farid Shouky (EGY)	Yasmine Rostom (EGY)	Julene Van Rooyen (RSA)
Hoop	Mariz Farid Shouky (EGY); Grace Legote (RSA)	none awarded	Sibongile Mjekula (RSA)
Ball	Heba Khaled El Bourini (EGY)	Mariz Farid Shouky (EGY)	Julene Van Rooyen (RSA)
Ribbon	Stephanie Sandler (RSA)	Mariz Farid Shouky (EGY)	Julene Van Rooyen (RSA)
