= Login Elsasyed =

Egyptian rhythmic gymnast

- Born: 1 January 2003 (age 23) Alexandria, Egypt

Gymnastics career
- Discipline: Rhythmic gymnastics
- Country represented: Egypt
- Club: Smouha SC
- Head coach: Jayla Garatova
Medal record
African Championships
Gold medal – first place	2020 Sharm El Sheikh	All-around
Gold medal – first place	2020 Sharm El Sheikh	5 balls
Gold medal – first place	2020 Sharm El Sheikh	3 hoops + 2 clubs

Login Elsasyed Islam (born 1 January 2003) is an Egyptian rhythmic gymnast. She won three gold medals at the 2020 African Championships and represented Egypt at the 2020 Summer Olympics.

== Career ==
Elsasyed began rhythmic gymnastics at the age of three at the Smouha SC club in her hometown, Alexandria. She was inspired by an older cousin who also participated in the sport.

Elsasyed won the bronze medal in the junior all-around at the 2018 African Rhythmic Gymnastics Championships in Cairo. Additionally, she won bronze medals with the hoop, clubs, and ribbon. She only placed eighth with the ball. She also helped Egypt win the junior team title.

Elsasyed became age-eligible for senior competitions in 2019, and she joined Egypt's senior national group. She competed at the 2020 African Rhythmic Gymnastics Championships in Sharm El Sheikh, winning three gold medals in group all around, in group 5 balls, and in group 3 hoops + 2 clubs. With this result, Egypt qualified a rhythmic gymnastics group to the Olympic Games for the first time ever. This also marked the first time an African nation qualified for the Olympic rhythmic gymnastics group event. She competed with the Egyptian group at the 2021 Baku World Cup, and they placed 13th in the group all-around. They did not advance into either apparatus final.

Elsasyed was selected to represent Egypt at the 2020 Summer Olympics alongside Polina Fouda, Salma Saleh, Malak Selim, and Tia Sobhy. They finished thirteenth in the qualification round for the group all-around. They did not advance into the group-all-around final.
