= Dipen Dewan =

Bangladeshi politician

- দীপেন দেওয়ান
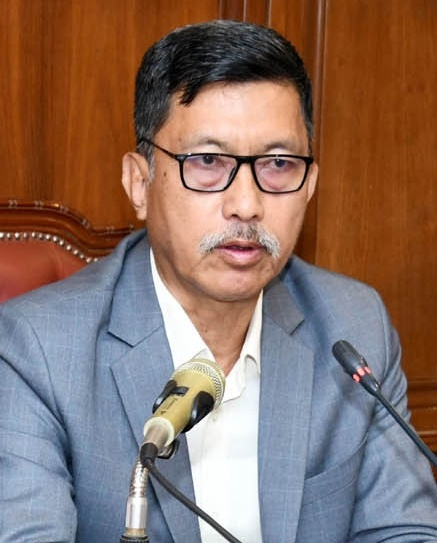
- Dewan in 2026

Member of Parliament
- Incumbent
- Assumed office 17 February 2026
- Preceded by: Dipankar Talukdar
- Constituency: Rangamati

Minister of Chittagong Hill Tracts Affairs
- In office 17 February 2026 – 1 June 2026
- Prime Minister: Tarique Rahman
- Preceded by: Supradip Chakma
- Succeeded by: Sa Ching Prue Jerry

Personal details
- Born: 8 June 1963 (age 63) Rangamati, East Pakistan
- Party: Bangladesh Nationalist Party
- Spouse: Maitri Chakma
- Parent: Subimal Dewan (father)
- Education: University of Dhaka

Dipen Dewan is a Bangladeshi politician, advocate, and former district president of the Bangladesh Nationalist Party in Rangamati. He formerly served as a Member of Parliament from Rangamati and as the Minister for the Ministry of Chittagong Hill Tracts Affairs.

== Early life ==
Dewan was born on 8 June 1963 in the Mantripara area of College Gate in Rangamati. His father, Subimal Dewan, served as an adviser on tribal affairs to President Ziaur Rahman. Dewan belongs to the Chakma community and practices Buddhism.

He passed the Secondary School Certificate (SSC) examination in 1978. He later enrolled at Rangamati Government College for his Higher Secondary studies. During this time, he formally began his involvement in student politics as a founding organizer of the Rangamati Government College unit of the Jatiyatabadi Chhatra Dal, the student wing of the Bangladesh Nationalist Party (BNP). He obtained a master's degree in law from the University of Dhaka and subsequently joined the Judicial Service as an assistant judge.

== Politics ==
In 2005, he resigned from his position as a Joint District Judge and entered politics by joining the Bangladesh Nationalist Party (BNP). In 2010, he became President of the Rangamati District BNP. Since 2016, he has been serving as Joint Secretary for Religious Affairs of the party's central committee.

In the 2026 Bangladeshi general election, Dewan was one of four candidates nationwide who won by a margin of more than 150,000 votes. He secured the largest margin of victory in the election. Contesting from the Rangamati constituency, Dewan defeated independent candidate Pahel Chakma by a margin of 170,322 votes. He received 201,544 votes, while Chakma, who contested with the Football symbol, received 31,222 votes. The constituency had more than 500,000 registered voters. He was appointed to the Ministry of Chittagong Hill Tracts Affairs during the administration led by Tarique Rahman.

On 1 June 2026, Dewan resigned his position due to physical illness and various complications.
