= Julene van Rooyen =

South African rhythmic gymnast

- Born: 8 July 1993 (age 33)

Gymnastics career
- Discipline: Rhythmic gymnastics
- Country represented: South Africa (2009-2014)
- Head coach: Tatiana Lavrentchouk-Vizer
- Retired: yes
Medal record
Rhythmic gymnastics
Representing South Africa
African Gymnastics Championships
Gold medal – first place	2014 Pretoria	Team
Silver medal – second place	2012 Pretoria	Team
Silver medal – second place	2014 Pretoria	Ball
Bronze medal – third place	2010 Walvis Bay	Rope
Bronze medal – third place	2010 Walvis Bay	Ball
Bronze medal – third place	2010 Walvis Bay	Ribbon
Bronze medal – third place	2014 Pretoria	Hoop

Julene van Rooyen (born 8 July 1993) is a retired South African rhythmic gymnast. She's a multiple African Championships medalist.

== Biography ==
Van Rooyen and her younger sister Aimee took up the sport at a young age encouraged by their mother. In 2009 she made her debut as a senior at the World Championships in Mie, being 116th in the All-Around, 114th with rope, 112th with hoop, 115th with ball, and 32nd in teams.

In March 2010 she took part in the African Championships in Walvis Bay, where she won bronze in the All-Around, with ball and with ribbon. In September she was selected for the World Championships in Moscow, finishing 112th in the All-Around, 113th with rope, 118th with hoop, 110th with ball, 121st with ribbon and 35th in teams.

In 2011 she again competed at the World Championships in Montpellier, she took 108th in the All-Around, 106th with hoop, 100th with ball, 123rd with clubs, 95th with ribbon and 29th in teams.

In December 2012 Van Rooyen won silver in teams (along Grace Legote, Gululethu Nkambule and Aimee Van Rooyen) at the 2012 African Championships. In July 2013 she was set to compete at the Universiade in Kazan, but just a day after arriving in Russia, in her first hour of practise, she felt an unbearable pain. After being examined by doctors she was rushed to the hospital to have her appendix removed, thus ruling her out of the competition.

The following year she won gold in teams, silver with ball and bronze with hoop at the 2014 African Championships in Pretoria. A month later she competed at the World Cup in Tashkent, taking 30th place in the All-Around, 29th with hoop, 29th with ball, 28th with clubs and 30th with ribbon. In July she was selected for the Commonwealth Games in Glasgow along Legote and her sister. In Scotland she was 6th in teams and 22nd in the All-Around.
