= 2020 African Rhythmic Gymnastics Championships =

Rhythmic gymnastics competition

2020 African Gymnastics Championships
- Location: Sharm el-Sheikh, Egypt
- Start date: 10 March 2020
- End date: 15 March 2020

The 2020 African Rhythmic Gymnastics Championships also known as The 15th African Championships was held from 10 to 15 March 2020 in Sharm El Sheikh, Egypt. This was the second time that the African Rhythmic Gymnastics Championships were hosted by Egypt. These championships are organized in conjunction with the African Aerobic Gymnastics Championships.

== Senior medal winners ==
=== Team ===
Event	Gold	Silver	Bronze
All-around	Egypt; Habiba Marzouk; Aliaa Saleh; Mariam Selim; Sana Elsherbiny	South Africa; Lilica Burger; Azra Dewan; Shannon Gardiner; Erin Wakefield	Morocco; Myriam Aranda Harandou; Dikra El Idrissi Dafali; Sofia Moussaoui

=== Individual ===
Event	Gold	Silver	Bronze
All-around	Habiba Marzouk (EGY)	Mariam Selim (EGY)	Lilica Burger (RSA)
Hoop	Habiba Marzouk (EGY)	Mariam Selim (EGY)	Luana Gomes (ANG)
Ball	Habiba Marzouk (EGY)	Aliaa Saleh (EGY)	Luana Gomes (ANG)
Clubs	Habiba Marzouk (EGY)	Mariam Selim (EGY)	Lilica Burger (RSA)
Ribbon	Habiba Marzouk (EGY)	Mariam Selim (EGY)	Luana Gomes (ANG)

=== Group ===
Event	Gold	Silver	Bronze
All-around	Egypt; Login Elsasyed; Polina Fouda; Salma Saleh; Malak Selim; Tia Sobhy	South Africa; Hannah Cawood; Kerryn Cowper; Morongoa Mokholoane; Karishma Naicker; Magreet Van Wyk	Algeria; Amira-Meriem Hamadouche; Maria Ourida Hamza; Thiziri Kadi; Lamis Mezough; Asma Ouzid; Lyna Sibachir
5 Balls	Egypt; Login Elsasyed; Polina Fouda; Salma Saleh; Malak Selim; Tia Sobhy	South Africa; Hannah Cawood; Kerryn Cowper; Morongoa Mokholoane; Karishma Naicker; Magreet Van Wyk	Algeria; Amira-Meriem Hamadouche; Maria Ourida Hamza; Thiziri Kadi; Lamis Mezough; Asma Ouzid; Lyna Sibachir
3 Hoops + 2 Clubs	Egypt; Login Elsasyed; Polina Fouda; Salma Saleh; Malak Selim; Tia Sobhy	South Africa; Hannah Cawood; Kerryn Cowper; Morongoa Mokholoane; Karishma Naicker; Magreet Van Wyk	Algeria; Amira-Meriem Hamadouche; Maria Ourida Hamza; Thiziri Kadi; Lamis Mezough; Asma Ouzid; Lyna Sibachir
