= 2002 African Rhythmic Gymnastics Championships =

2002 African Gymnastics Championships
- Location: Algiers, Algeria
- Start date: 12 October 2002
- End date: 18 October 2002

The 2002 African Rhythmic Gymnastics Championships were held from 12 to 18 October 2002 in Algiers, Algeria.

The championships were held along the 2002 African Artistic Gymnastics Championships and the 2002 African Trampoline Championships.

== Medal winners ==
Games	Gold	Silver	Bronze
Seniors
Teams	South Africa	Egypt	Cape Verde
All-Around	Belinda Potgieter (RSA)	K Maye (EGY)	Renate Janse van Ransburg (RSA)
Juniors
Teams	South Africa	Egypt	Cape Verde
All-Around	Odette Richard (RSA)	S Mohamed (EGY)	H A Ihabe (EGY)
Groups
All-Around	South Africa	Egypt	Cape Verde
