= Lamis Mezough =

Moroccan individual rhythmic gymnast (born 2001)

- لميس مزوغ
- Born: 6 June 2004 (age 22) Saïda, Algeria

Gymnastics career
- Discipline: Rhythmic gymnastics
- Country represented: Algeria; (2018-present)
- Retired: yes
Medal record
Rhythmic gymnastics
Representing Algeria
African Gymnastics Championships
Bronze medal – third place	2020 Cairo	Group All-Around
Bronze medal – third place	2020 Cairo	5 Balls
Bronze medal – third place	2020 Cairo	3 Hoops + 4 Clubs

Lamis Mezough (Arabic: لميس مزوغ; born 6 June 2004) is an Algerian rhythmic gymnast. She won a bronze medal at the 2020 African Rhythmic Gymnastics Championships.

== Career ==
In 2016, Mezough won silver at nationals among pre juniors. Two years later she became the Algerian national junior champion.

She became age eligible for senior competitions in 2020, being incorporated into the national senior group for the African Championships in Sharm el-Sheikh along Amira-Meriem Hamadouche, Maria Ourida Hamza, Thiziri Kadi, Asma Ouzid and Lyna Sibachir. There, they won bronze in the All-Around, with five balls and with three hoops and four clubs.

In 2025, she was selected, as an individual, for the African Championships in Kigali, being 14th with hoop, 15th with ball and 14th with ribbon. The following year she took part in the 2026 African Championships in Cairo, being the only senior representative for Algeria.
