= Dipankar Talukdar =

Bangladeshi politician

- দীপংকর তালুকদার
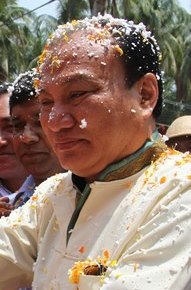

Member of the Bangladesh Parliament for Rangamati
- In office 3 January 2019 – 6 August 2024
- Preceded by: Ushatan Talukder
- Succeeded by: Dipen Dewan
- In office 25 January 2009 – 24 January 2014
- Preceded by: Moni Swapan Dewan
- In office 14 July 1996 – 13 July 2001
- Preceded by: Parijat Kusum Chakma
- In office 5 March 1991 – 24 November 1995
- Preceded by: Binoy Kumar Dewan

Minister of State for Chittagong Hill Tracts Affairs
- In office 6 January 2009 – 24 January 2014
- Prime Minister: Sheikh Hasina
- Preceded by: Iftekhar Ahmed Chowdhury
- Succeeded by: Ushwe Sing

Personal details
- Born: 12 December 1952 (age 73) Rangamati, East Bengal, Dominion of Pakistan
- Party: Bangladesh Awami League
- Spouse: Bita Talukdar
- Education: Dhaka College University of Dhaka
- Occupation: Politician

Dipankar Talukdar (born 12 December 1952) is a Bangladesh Awami League politician and a former state minister of Chittagong Hill Tracts Affairs. He is a former member of Jatiya Sangsad representing Rangamati. He is a member Bangladesh Awami League Central executive committee and President of Bangladesh Awami League Rangamati hill district.

== Early life ==
Talukdar was born on 12 December 1952.

== Career ==
Talukdar was elected to parliament from Rangamati as a Bangladesh Awami League candidate.

Following the fall of the Sheikh Hasina led Awami League government, Talukdar was arrested in Dhaka in February 2025 by the Detective Branch. He secured bail in five cases against him in May 2026, but was immediately arrested in three new cases.
