= Ushatan Talukder =

Bangladeshi politician

Ushatan Talukder 𑄃𑄫𑄥𑄖𑄧𑄚𑄴 𑄖𑄣𑄪𑄇𑄴𑄘𑄢𑄴
- ঊষাতন তালুকদার
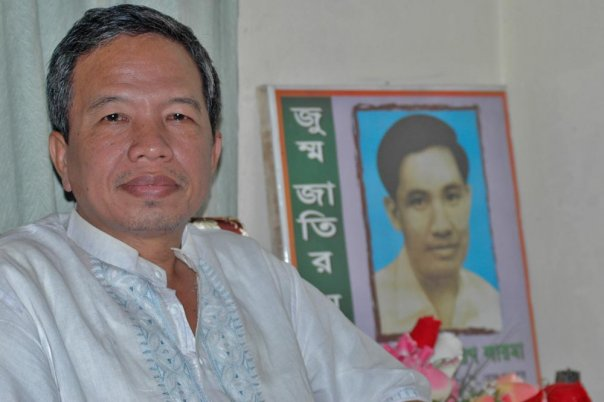

Member of Parliament
- In office 5 January 2014 – 3 January 2018
- Preceded by: Dipankar Talukdar
- Succeeded by: Dipankar Talukdar
- Constituency: Rangamati

Personal details
- Born: 5 August 1950 (age 76) Rangamati, East Pakistan
- Party: Parbatya Chattagram Jana Samhati Samiti
- Education: University of Chittagong

Ushatan Talukder (Bengali: ঊষাতন তালুকদার) is a Bangladeshi politician and was the member of parliament for Rangamati Hill District from 2014 to 2018. He is a leader of the indigenous community of Rangamati.

== Career ==
Ushatan Talukder was elected to Parliament from Rangamati Hill District in 2014 as an independent candidate. On 10 June 2018, Bangladesh Police arrested 7 people for attempting to extort Ushatan. He is the General Secretary of the Parbatya Chattagram Jana Samhati Samiti.
