= Bhushanchhara massacre =

Massacre of Bengali settlers

- Part of the Chittagong Hill Tracts conflict
- Location: Bhushanchhara Union, Rangamati District, Chittagong Hill Tracts, Bangladesh
- Date: 31 May 1984
- Target: Bengali settlers
- Attack type: Massacre
- Deaths: 400 (Note: According to the cited source.)
- Perpetrator: Shanti Bahini
- Motive: Ethnic violence during the Chittagong Hill Tracts conflict

Bhushanchhara massacre was a massacre of Bengalis in Bhushanchhora union of Rangamati District of the Chittagong Hill Tracts. It was committed by the Shanti Bahini, the armed wing of the Parbatya Chattagram Jana Samhati Samiti on 31st of May, 1984.

== Background ==
On May 31 1984, the Bengalis living in Bhushanchhara union of Barkal Upazila of Rangamati were targeted.

According to claims made by locals and security sources, an armed group of 125 of Shanti Bahini personnel headed Moni Swapan Dewan alias Major Rajesh surrounded the entire village late at night. In just four hours from 4 am to 8 am, they killed 400 ethnic Bengalis, including women and children.

== Aftermath ==
No case of the incident was registered with the police. Victims of the massacre allege that reports of the massacre were covered up, and no reports of the incident was published in local and foreign media.

Moni Swapan, the alleged chief perpetrator, later became a member of parliament and deputy minister for Chittagong Hill Tracts Affairs.

As of 2023, the killing has not gone to trial and victims were yet to be compensated.
