= Sudipta Dewan =

Bangladeshi politician

- সুদীপ্তা দেওয়ান

Member of Bangladesh Parliament
- In office 7 March 1973 – 6 November 1976
- Preceded by: Position established

Personal details
- Died: 18 July 2015
- Party: Awami League

Sudipta Dewan (died on 18 July 2015) was a Awami League politician in Bangladesh and a Jatiya Sangsad member of women's reserved seat.

== Career ==
Dewan was elected to parliament from women's reserved seat as an Awami League candidate in 1973.

== Death ==
Dewan died on 18 July 2015.

== Personal life ==
Dewan's husband, AK Dewan, was the first mayor of Rangamati municipality. On 16 September 2019, her family members accused Bangladesh Nationalist Party leader Dipen Dewan of trying to forcefully grab their family property in Rangamati.
