= Aimee van Rooyen =

South African rhythmic gymnast

Aimee Van Rooyen
- Born: 20 December 1995 (age 30)

Gymnastics career
- Discipline: Rhythmic gymnastics
- Country represented: South Africa
Medal record
Rhythmic gymnastics
Representing South Africa
African Gymnastics Championships
Gold medal – first place	2014 Pretoria	Team
Silver medal – second place	2012 Pretoria	Team
Silver medal – second place	2012 Pretoria	Hoop
Bronze medal – third place	2012 Pretoria	Clubs
Bronze medal – third place	2012 Pretoria	Ribbon

Aimee Van Rooyen (born 20 December 1995) is a South African individual rhythmic gymnast. She represents her nation at international competitions. She competed at world championships, including at the 2011 World Rhythmic Gymnastics Championships. She was selected for the 2014 Commonwealth Games and 2010 Summer Youth Olympics.

His sister Julene also is an international rhythmic gymnast.

After her retirement from the sport she became a judge.
