= Polina Fouda =

Egyptian rhythmic gymnast

- Full name: Polina Fouda ‘Amru
- Born: 17 June 2003 (age 23) Latvia

Gymnastics career
- Discipline: Rhythmic gymnastics
- Country represented: Egypt
Medal record
African Championships
Gold medal – first place	2020 Sharm El Sheikh	All-around
Gold medal – first place	2020 Sharm El Sheikh	5 balls
Gold medal – first place	2020 Sharm El Sheikh	3 hoops + 2 clubs

Polina Fouda ‘Amru (born 17 June 2003) is an Egyptian former group rhythmic gymnast. She represented Egypt at the 2020 Summer Olympics and won three gold medals at the 2020 African Championships.

== Career ==
Fouda became age-eligible for senior competitions in 2019 and joined the Egyptian senior national group. She competed at the 2020 African Rhythmic Gymnastics Championships in Sharm el-Sheikh, winning three gold medals in the general, in group 5 balls and in group 3 hoops + 2 clubs. Because of their continental group all-around title, Egypt qualified a rhythmic gymnastics group to the Olympic Games for the first time ever. This also marked the first time an African nation qualified for the Olympic rhythmic gymnastics group event. She competed with the Egyptian group at the 2021 Baku World Cup, and they placed 13th in the group all-around. They did not advance into either apparatus final. They won a gold medal in 5 balls at the 2021 Pharaohs Cup held in Cairo.

Fouda was selected to represent Egypt at the 2020 Summer Olympics alongside Login Elsasyed, Salma Saleh, Malak Selim, and Tia Sobhy. They finished thirteenth out of fourteen teams in the qualification round for the group all-around and did not advance into the final.

== Personal life ==
Fouda was born in Latvia but grew up in Egypt. She ended her gymnastics career after the 2020 Summer Olympics and moved to Enschede, the Netherlands, to study International Human Resource & Management at the Saxion University of Applied Sciences. She began coaching at a rhythmic gymnastics club in Enschede.
