= Shannon Gardiner =

South African rhythmic gymnast (born 1999)

- Born: 25 October 1999 (age 26) Pretoria

Gymnastics career
- Discipline: Rhythmic gymnastics
- Country represented: South Africa; (2014–2022)
- Club: Tuks Gymnastics
- Head coach: Nina Ervedosa
Medal record
Rhythmic Gymnastics
Representing South Africa
African Championships
Silver medal – second place	2016 Walvis Bay	Team
Silver medal – second place	2018 Cairo	Team
Silver medal – second place	2022 Cairo	Team
Junior African Championships
Silver medal – second place	2014 Pretoria	Team
Silver medal – second place	2014 Pretoria	All-Around
Silver medal – second place	2014 Pretoria	Hoop
Bronze medal – third place	2014 Pretoria	Ball

Shannon Gardiner (25 October 1999) is a South African retired rhythmic gymnast. She represented South Africa in international competitions.

== Personal life ==
Her father competed in swimming at national level in South Africa. She developed an interest in the sport while watching the rhythmic gymnastics competition at the 2004 Olympic Games, she began training in artistic gymnastics before switching to rhythmic gymnastics at age seven. Her gymnastics' idol is Aleksandra Soldatova. She studied law at the University of Pretoria. In 2018 she was presented with the Honorary Colours of Sport medal at the University of Pretoria's Tuks Sports Awards Gala.

== Career ==
=== Junior ===
In 2014 Gardiner won silver in teams (with Alexia Bazzo, Chris-Marie van Wyk and Palesa Mohlamme), in the All-Around and with hoop, as well as bronze ball at the African Championships. She was then selected for the Youth Olympics in Nanjing, being 15th in the qualifying round and thus not advancing to the final.

=== Senior ===
She became age eligible for senior competitions in 2015. In late August 2016 she won silver in teams along Chris-Marie Van Wyk, Grace Legote and Palesa Mohlamme, at the African Championships. A torn ligament meant she was unable to compete at a qualification event in South Africa ahead of the 2016 Olympic Games.

In 2018 she competed at the African Championships in Cairo, where she won silver in teams alongside Lilica Burger, Grace Legote and Chris-Marie Van Wyk. In September she was selected for her maiden World Championships in Sofia, being 100th in the All-Around, 112th with hoop, 119th with ball and 93rd with clubs and 36th in teams.

In September 2019 she took part in the World Cup in Portimão where she was 31st overall. Later she competed at the World Championships in Baku, taking 98th place in the All-Around, 91st with hoop, 81st with ball, 137th with clubs, 126th with ribbon and 38th in teams (with Azra Dewan and Lilica Burger). In October she tore the lateral meniscus in her right kneeat a competition in Durban, she underwent surgery and returned to training in January 2020.

In March 2020, before the season was cut short because of the COVID-19 pandemic, she won silver in teams, with Azra Dewan, Lilica Burger and Erin Wakefield

The following year she competed at the 2021 World Championships in Kitakyushu, being 58th in the All-Around, 55th with hoop, 56th with ball, 60th with clubs and 55th with ribbon.

In June 2022 she competed at the African Championships in Cairo and won silver in teams along with fellow South African gymnasts Yulia Galukhin, Kayla Rondi and Stephanie Dimitrova. A month later she participated in the World Games in Birmingham, being 22nd with hoop, 22nd with ball, 22nd with clubs and 22nd with ribbon.
