= Amina Chtiba =

Tunisian rhythmic and aerobic gymnast

- Born: 1998 (age 27–28) Tunis

Gymnastics career
- Discipline: Rhythmic gymnastics
- Country represented: Tunisia (2012-?)
- Retired: yes
Medal record
Representing Tunisia
Rhythmic gymnastics
African Championships
Bronze medal – third place	2012 Pretoria	Team
Bronze medal – third place	2014 Pretoria	Team

Amina Chtiba (born 1998) is a retired Tunisian rhythmic gymnast. She represented her country in international competitions.

== Career ==
In 2012, Amina was selected for the African Championships in Pretoria, where she won bronze in teams among juniors along Amani El Kefi and Nasfi Ichrak.

Two years later, as a senior, she won again the bronze medal in the team category with Maisa Ghazouani, at the 2014 African Championships in Pretoria. In 2016 she competed in the Summer Stars tournament.

In 2019 Chtiba started working as a coach Marsa Gymnastics Academy.
