= Heba Khaled El Bourini =

Egyptian rhythmic gymnast

- Born: August 25, 1994 (age 32) Cairo, Egypt

Gymnastics career
- Discipline: Rhythmic gymnastics
- Country represented: Egypt (2009 - 2015)
- Club: Gezira Club
- Retired: yes
Medal record
Representing Egypt
Rhythmic Gymnastics
African Championships
Gold medal – first place	2009 Cairo	All-Around
Gold medal – first place	2010 Walvis Bay	Ball

Heba Khaled El Bourini (born 25 August 1994) is a retired Egyptian rhythmic gymnast. She represented her country in international competitions.

== Biography ==
Heba studied at the English Modern School in Cairo. Her mother was a gymnast as well as her grandfather Lotaif Mahgoub, a pioneer of Egyptian gymnastics in the 1930s. She was described as a future champion as young as 12 years old while she was training for Gezira Club.

She won gold at the 2007 Arab Games in her native Cairo. In 2009 she was crowned junior champion at the African Championships.

In 2010 she was selected for her maiden World Championships in Moscow, being 71st in the All-Around, 73rd with rope, 82nd with hoop, 91st with ball, 53rd with ribbon and 29th in teams. That year she also won gold with ball at the African Championships in Walvis Bay.

In 2015 she competed at the World Championships in Stuttgart as a member of the group, finishing 22nd in the All-Around, 22nd with 5 ribbons and 22nd with 6 clubs & 2 hoops.
