= Lilia Kamoun =

Tunisian-Russian rhythmic gymnast

- Born: 1992 (age 33–34)

Gymnastics career
- Discipline: Rhythmic gymnastics
- Country represented: Tunisia
- Retired: yes
Medal record
Rhythmic gymnastics
Representing Tunisia
African Gymnastics Championships
Bronze medal – third place	2012 Pretoria	Team

Lilia Kamoun (born 1992) is a Tunisian-Russian ballet dancer, rhythmic gymnast and coach based in France. She represented Tunisia in international competitions.

== Career ==
Kamoun took up ballet after seeing a show while visiting her family in Moscow. Later she started practicing rhythmic gymnastics.

In 2012 she was selected for the African Championships in Pretoria, where she won bronze in the team competition along with Maisa Ghazouani and Inès Lakech.

After her retirement, she works as a ballerina, rhythmic gymnastics coach and judge.
