= Maisa Ghazouani =

Tunisian rhythmic and aerobic gymnast

- Born: 4 January 1995 (age 31) Tunis

Gymnastics career
- Discipline: Rhythmic gymnastics, Aerobic gymnastics
- Country represented: Tunisia (2012-?)
Medal record
Representing Tunisia
Rhythmic gymnastics
African Championships
Bronze medal – third place	2012 Pretoria	Team
Bronze medal – third place	2014 Pretoria	Team
Bronze medal – third place	2018 Cairo	Team
Aerobic gymnastics
African Games
Bronze medal – third place	2015 Brazzaville	Trio
African Championships
Bronze medal – third place	2016 Algiers	Trio

Maisa Ghazouani (born 4 January 1995) is a Tunisian rhythmic and aerobic gymnast. She's a multiple medalist at the African Championships.

== Career ==
In 2012, Maisa was selected for the African Championships in Pretoria, where she won bronze in teams along Lilia Kamoun and Inès Lakech.

Two years later, she repeated the result along Amina Chtiba at the 2014 African Championships in Pretoria.

In aerobic gymnastics, she won bronze in the mixed trio, along Dhaouadi Ameni and Lotfi Nidal, at the 2015 African Games in Brazzaville. In 2016, she was 53rd in the women solo at the World Championships in Incheon, and won bronze in the mixed trio at the African Championships in Algiers.

In 2018, she was again a team bronze medalist, with Senda Hammami, Minyar Jerbi and Manel Gharbi, at the African Rhythmic Gymnastics Championships in Cairo.
