= 2004 African Rhythmic Gymnastics Championships =

2004 African Gymnastics Championships
- Location: Thiès, Senegal
- Start date: 10 December 2004
- End date: 19 December 2004

The 2004 African Rhythmic Gymnastics Championships was held from 10 to 19 December in Thiès, Senegal. The championships include senior and junior events. They were organized jointly with the 2004 African Artistic Gymnastics Championships and the 2004 African Trampoline Championships.

== Medal winners ==
=== Senior ===
Event	Gold	Silver	Bronze
Team
Team	South Africa	Cape Verde	Tunisia
Individual Finals
All-Around	Stephanie Sandler (RSA)	Odette Richard (RSA)	Wania Monteiro (CPV)
Hoop	Wania Monteiro (CPV)		
Ball	Odette Richard (RSA)		
Clubs	Odette Richard (RSA)		
Ribbon	Odette Richard (RSA)		

=== Junior ===
Event	Gold	Silver	Bronze
Team
Team	South Africa	Cape Verde	Tunisia
Individual Finals
All-Around	Sibongile Mjekula (RSA)	Ntaté Rangaka (RSA)	Amor Kruger (RSA)
Rope	Sibongile Mjekula (RSA)		
Ball	Sibongile Mjekula (RSA)		
Clubs	Sibongile Mjekula (RSA)		
Ribbon	Sibongile Mjekula (RSA)		
Group Finals
All-Around	South Africa	Cape Verde	Tunisia
