= Krishan Dev Dewan =

Indian Social Worker

- Born: India
- Occupation: Social worker
- Known for: Vaishali Area Small Farmers Association
- Children: Dr. S.K.Dewan, Mr. Sudhir Dewan, Mrs. Asha Chaudhary, Mr. Rajiv Dewan Dr. Vanita Kapoor
- Awards: Padma Shri

Krishan Dev Dewan is an Indian social worker and the founder of Vaishali Area Small Farmers Association, a non governmental organization for the welfare of the farmers in Vaishali, in the Indian state of Bihar. He is known to have organised the refugee farmers of Nilokheri to make them self-reliant. His activities at Vaishali have been listed by the Food and Agriculture Organization, placing them under People's participation in development. The Government of India awarded him the fourth highest Indian civilian honour of Padma Shri in 1986.

== See also ==
- Food and Agriculture Organization
