= Moni Swapan Dewan =

Bangladeshi politician (born 1954)

- 𑄟𑄧𑄚𑄨𑄥𑄧𑄛𑄧𑄚𑄴 𑄘𑄬𑄃𑄮𑄠𑄚𑄴

Deputy Minister of Chittagong Hill Tracts Affairs
- In office 10 October 2001 – 29 October 2006
- Prime Minister: Khaleda Zia
- Preceded by: Post created
- Succeeded by: Iftekhar Ahmed Chowdhury

Member of Parliament
- In office 1 October 2001 – 29 October 2006
- Preceded by: Dipankar Talukdar
- Succeeded by: Dipankar Talukdar
- Constituency: Rangamati

Personal details
- Born: 18 May 1954 (age 72) Rangamati, East Bengal, Pakistan
- Party: Liberal Democratic Party
- Other political affiliations: Bangladesh Nationalist Party

Moni Swapan Dewan (born 18 May 1954) alias Major Rajesh was a Bangladesh Nationalist Party politician, ethnic Chakma, and a former member of parliament from the Chittagong Hill Tracts. He is also the former deputy minister for Hill Tracts Affairs.

He started his career as a guerilla leader for the Shanti Bahini, the armed wing of the Parbatya Chattagram Jana Samhati Samiti.

== Career ==
Moni Swapan was a member of the Shanti Bahini during the Chittagong Hill Tracts conflict and was known as Major Rajesh. He is accused of committing a massacre of settler Bengalis in the Rangamati district in 1984. Dewan denies the charges.

Dewan was elected to parliament from Rangamati constituency as a candidate of the Bangladesh Nationalist Party beating the former member of parliament Dipankar Talukder of the Awami League.

Dewan was appointed the deputy minister of Chittagong Hill Tracts Affairs in the 2001 to 2006 Bangladesh Nationalist Party government. In 2003, he threatened to resign from the government alleging he was being ignored, there was corruption, and issues in the Chittagong Hill Tracts were not being resolved. In 2004, the government restricted the usage of ministry funds by him to 25 percent of the allocated fund. He called for the recognition of ethnic minority in the constitution of Bangladesh in 2006. He tried to introduce bus services in his constituency but failed due to opposition from the Rangamati District Auto-rickshaw Sramik Union. He inaugurated a solar power plant in Rangamati in 2006. As member of parliament he received a plot of land in Dhaka from RAJUK.

In November 2006, Dewan left the Bangladesh Nationalist Party to join the Liberal Democratic Party.
