= Odette Richard =

South African rhythmic gymnast (1988–2020)

- Full name: Odette Petra-Lee Richard
- Born: 18 July 1988
- Died: 16 December 2020 (aged 32) Johannesburg
- Height: 1.60 m (5 ft 3 in)

Gymnastics career
- Discipline: Rhythmic gymnastics
- Country represented: South Africa (2002-2008)
- Head coach: Maureen van Rooyen
Medal record
Rhythmic gymnastics
Representing South Africa
African Gymnastics Championships
Gold medal – first place	2002 Algiers	Junior Team
Gold medal – first place	2002 Algiers	Junior All-Around
Gold medal – first place	2004 Thiès	Team
Gold medal – first place	2004 Thiès	Ball
Gold medal – first place	2004 Thiès	Clubs
Gold medal – first place	2004 Thiès	Ribbon
Silver medal – second place	2004 Thiès	All-Around

Odette Richard (18 July 1988 – 16 December 2020) was a South African individual rhythmic gymnast. She competed at the 2004 Commonwealth Youth Games, the 2006 Commonwealth Games, and the 2008 Summer Olympics.

== Career ==
Richard began rhythmic gymnastics at age 5 when her mother took her to the gym. Her favorite gymnasts were Yanina Batyrchina, Irina Tchachina, and Natalia Godunko. While she was in school, she trained for four hours a day, and after graduating secondary school, she trained 5 to 8 hours six days a week. She noted that it was difficult to compete as a gymnast far away from Europe, where rhythmic gymnastics developed and was most popular, both because it made traveling to competitions expensive and because it meant that she and other gymnasts were not caught up on recent technique.

Richard competed at the 2003 World Championships in Budapest, and she finished in 103rd place.

The next year, she competed at the 2004 Commonwealth Youth Games. In the all-around, she finished in 4th place, but in the apparatus finals, she won bronze with rope and silver with clubs. She and the other members of the South African team won silver in the team event.

At the 2005 World Championships, she finished in 69th place. The next year, at the 2006 Commonwealth Games in Melbourne, she finished 11th in the all-around. She was 70th at the 2007 World Championships.

In 2008, she competed at the 2008 Summer Olympics in Beijing after receiving the wildcard quota, as she was top gymnast from an African country at the 2007 World Championships. She placed 23rd in the qualification round.

== Post-gymnastics career and death ==
Richard graduated from the University of the Witwatersrand in 2011 with degrees in finance and accounting. She briefly worked as a sports commentator on television before joining Deloitte South Africa in 2012 as an article clerk. In December 2014, she transitioned to Rand Merchant Bank, serving as a resource credit analyst and corporate finance transactor. She died in 2020 at age 32.
