= Basma Ouatay =

Moroccan individual rhythmic gymnast (born 1999)

- Born: 27 October 1999 (age 26)

Gymnastics career
- Discipline: Rhythmic gymnastics
- Country represented: Morocco (2015)
Medal record
Rhythmic gymnastics
Representing Morocco
Junior African Championships
Bronze medal – third place	2014 Pretoria	Team

Basma Ouatay (born 27 October 1999) is a Moroccan individual rhythmic gymnast who trains in France. She represents her nation at international competitions.

She competed at world championships, including at the 2015 World Rhythmic Gymnastics Championships.
