= Stephanie Sandler =

South African Olympic gymnast

Stephanie Molly Emma Sandler
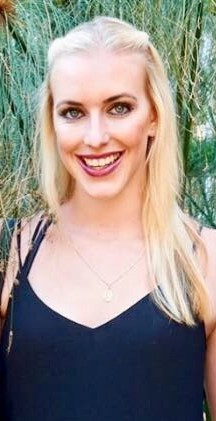

Personal information
- Nickname: Supernova
- Born: 9 October 1987 (age 38) Cape Town
- Height: 173 cm (5 ft 8 in)

Gymnastics career
- Discipline: Rhythmic gymnastics
- Country represented: South Africa; (2000-2011)
- Head coach: Maureen van Rooyen
- Retired: 2011
Medal record
Rhythmic gymnastics
Representing South Africa
African Gymnastics Championships
Gold medal – first place	2004 Thiès	Team
Gold medal – first place	2004 Thiès	All-Around
Gold medal – first place	2010 Walvis Bay	Ribbon
Silver medal – second place	2009 Cairo	All-Around

Stephanie Molly Emma Sandler (born 9 October 1987) is a South African individual rhythmic gymnast. She represented her nation at various international competitions. She was the first South African rhythmic gymnast to participate at an Olympic Games.

== Career ==
Sandler started rhythmic gymnastics at the age of 6, and went on to participate at the 2004 Summer Olympics in Athens.

After watching the 1999 Rhythmic Gymnastics World Championships live in Osaka (JPN), competing in the Olympic Games was always the long-term goal.

She is a three-time silver medalist from the Commonwealth Youth Games, in Bendigo, Australia. She finished 7th all around in the 2004 ribbon apparatus final, at the Julietta Shishmanova Grand Prix in Bulgaria.

She has won various National championship and African championship titles. She also competed at the world championships, including at the 2003, 2005 and 2007 World Rhythmic Gymnastics Championships.

Sandler was unable to attend the 2009 or 2010 World Championships, due to injuries, for which she eventually needed operations.

She is currently one of two South African rhythmic gymnasts who have received "world class" status from the FIG.

She officially retired from the national team after the 2011 World Universiades.

Sandler's favourite apparatus is the rope. In competition, her rope, ribbon and clubs produced some of her best results.

== Family ==
Sandler's father was a Lithuanian Jew. Her mother is South African born, of Scandinavian descent. She has one brother, David Aron Ray Sandler (born 12 June 1989), who is a former fencer for the South African national team. She also has half and step siblings.
