= Tia Sobhy =

Egyptian rhythmic gymnast

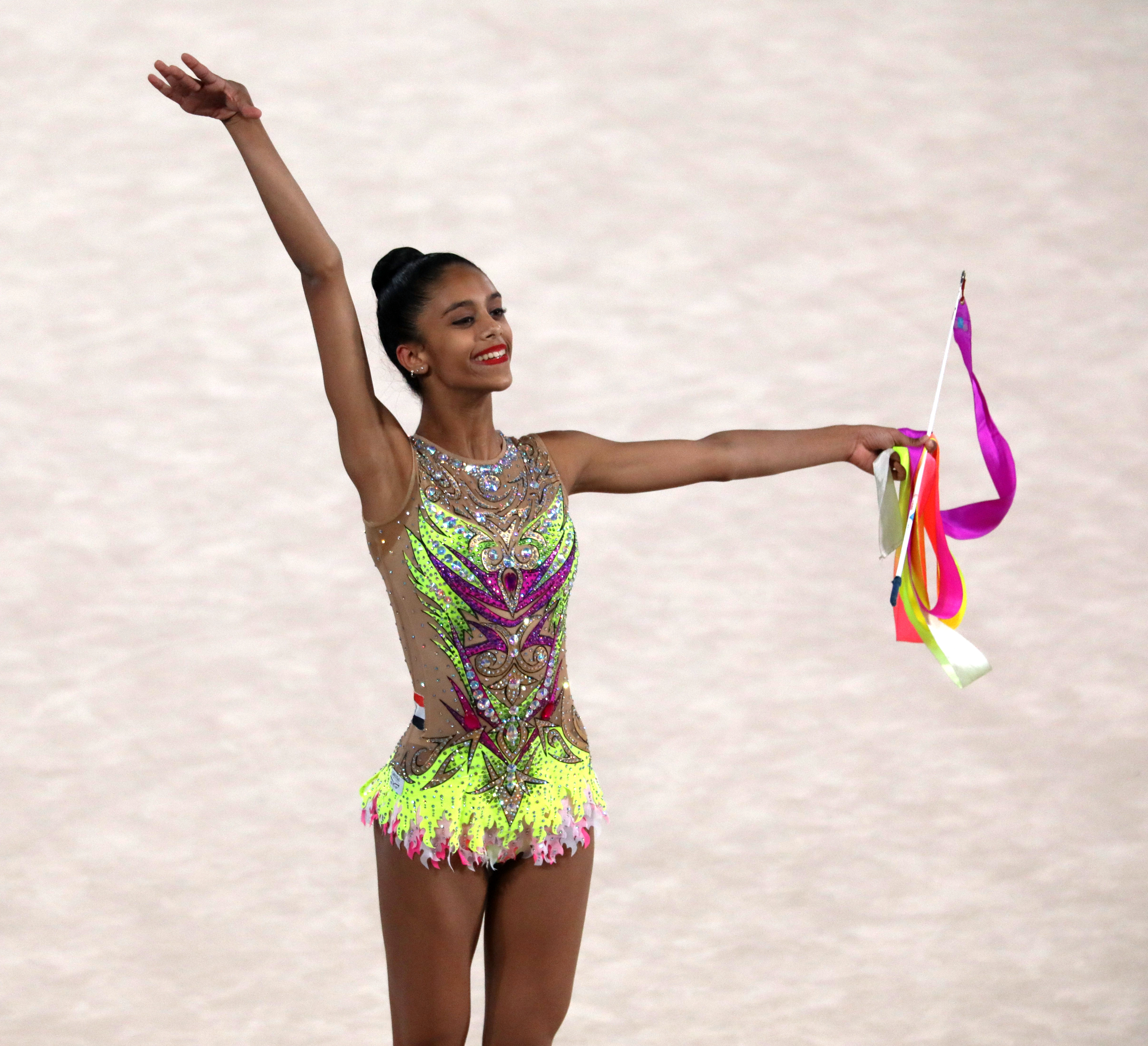
- Sobhy at the 2018 Summer Youth Olympics

Personal information
- Born: February 7, 2003 (age 23) United States

Gymnastics career
- Country represented: Egypt
Medal record
African Championships
Gold medal – first place	2016 Walvis Bay	5 balls
Gold medal – first place	2016 Walvis Bay	5 hoop
Gold medal – first place	2016 Walvis Bay	5-hoop + 5-ball
Gold medal – first place	2018 Cairo	Team
Gold medal – first place	2018 Cairo	All-around
Gold medal – first place	2018 Cairo	Balls
Gold medal – first place	2018 Cairo	Ribbon
Gold medal – first place	2020 Sharm El Sheikh	All-around
Gold medal – first place	2020 Sharm El Sheikh	5 balls
Gold medal – first place	2020 Sharm El Sheikh	3 hoops + 2 clubs
Silver medal – second place	2018 Cairo	Hoops
Silver medal – second place	2018 Cairo	Clubs

Tia Sobhy (born February 7, 2003, in the United States) is an Egyptian rhythmic gymnast, and 3 time gold medal winner in the 2016, 2018 and 2020 African Rhythmic Gymnastics Championships.

== Career ==
Sobhy joined Gezira Sporting Club at the age of 3 to practice rhythmic gymnastics and represented the club at national and international competitions.

In 2016, She competed in the junior group events at the 2016 African Rhythmic Gymnastics Championships in Walvis Bay, winning three gold medals in the 5-hoop events, the 5-ball events and in the 5-hoop + 5-ball event.

In 2018, Sobhy competed in the junior events at the 2018 African Rhythmic Gymnastics Championships in Cairo, winning 4 gold medals in the team competition, all-around, ball and ribbon, and two silver medals in hoop and clubs, which qualified her for the 2018 Summer Youth Olympics in Argentina.

At the 2020 African Rhythmic Gymnastics Championships in Sharm el-Sheikh, she competed in the group events, winning 3 gold medals in the all-around, 5 balls events and 3 hoops + 2 clubs event.

She was selected to represent Egypt at the 2020 Summer Olympics alongside Login Elsasyed, Polina Fouda, Salma Saleh, and Malak Selim. They finished thirteenth in the qualification round for the group all-around.
