= Sara Rostom =

Egyptian rhythmic gymnast

- سارة محمد رستم
- Full name: Sara Mohmed Rostom
- Nickname: Sarsoura
- Born: 1996 (age 29–30) Alexandria, Egypt

Gymnastics career
- Discipline: Rhythmic gymnastics
- Country represented: Egypt; (2008-2015)
- Club: Al-Iskanderiya
- Head coach: Yasmine Rostom
- Retired: yes
Medal record
Representing Egypt
Rhythmic Gymnastics
African Championships
Gold medal – first place	2012 Pretoria	Team
Gold medal – first place	2012 Pretoria	Hoop
Gold medal – first place	2014 Pretoria	Hoop
Silver medal – second place	2012 Pretoria	Ball
Silver medal – second place	2012 Pretoria	Clubs
Silver medal – second place	2014 Pretoria	All-Around
Silver medal – second place	2014 Pretoria	Team
Silver medal – second place	2014 Pretoria	Clubs
Silver medal – second place	2014 Pretoria	Ribbon

Sara Mohmed Rostom (Arabic: سارة محمد رستم born 1996) is an Egyptian rhythmic gymnast. She represented her country at international competitions.

== Personal life ==
Sara took up rhythmic gymnastics at age five at the Alexandria Sporting Club in Egypt, her older sister Yasmine (who became the first Egyptian to compete in the rhythmic gymnastics at the Olympic Games in 2012 and is also a judge) already competed in rhythmic gymnastics, and when their parents saw that she was successful, they pushed her and her younger sister to try the sport. Her dream was to compete at Rio 2016 Olympics. She speaks Arabic, English, French.

== Career ==
Rostom entered the Egyptian national team when she was 12 as she won nationals in 2007. She kept the title through her junior years in 2008, 2009, 2010, 2011.

In 2012, her first year as a senior, she won nationals once again and competed at the African Championships in Pretoria, winning team and hoop gold and finishing 2nd behind her sister in the All-Around, with ball and clubs.

Sara competed at the 2013 World Championships in Kyiv, she was 66th in the All-Around, 61st with hoop, 62nd with ball, 74th with clubs and 59th with ribbon.

2014 saw her becoming national champion again, and she took part in the African Championships again in Pretoria, winning gold with hoop and silver in the All-Around, the team competition, with clubs and with ribbons. Sara was also selected for the World Championships in Izmir. Along with Nourhal Kattab and Fatma Salman she was 27th in the team competition, 69th in the All-Around, 81st with hoop, 66th with ball, 64th with clubs and 79th with ribbon.

In 2015 she participated at the World Cup in Sofia, being 41st in the All-Around and with hoop, 40th with ball and ribbon and 42nd with clubs. Sara also competed at the World Championships in Stuttgart, with Nourhal Kattab and Fatma Salman she was 28th in the team competition, 66th in the All-Around, 82nd with hoop, 59th with ball, 55th with clubs and 81st with ribbon.

A serious back injury and trauma that forced her to quit the national team and so she could't make it to the 2016's Olympics in Rio, she planned of becoming a judge like her sister.
