= Habiba Marzouk =

Egyptian rhythmic gymnast (born 2002)

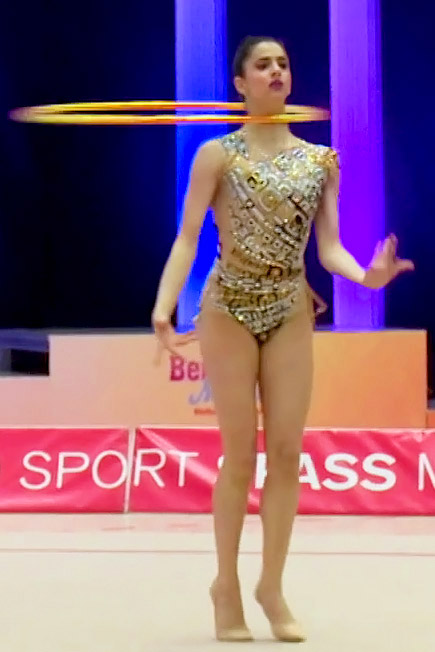
- Marzouk in 2020

Personal information
- Born: May 14, 2002 (age 24) Cairo, Egypt

Gymnastics career
- Discipline: Rhythmic gymnastics
- Club: Wadi Degla
- Head coach: Salma El Ridi
Medal record
Rhythmic Gymnastics
Representing Egypt
African Championships
| Gold medal – first place | 2018 Cairo | Team |
| Gold medal – first place | 2018 Cairo | All-around |
| Gold medal – first place | 2020 Sharm El Sheikh | Team |
| Gold medal – first place | 2020 Sharm El Sheikh | All-around |
| Gold medal – first place | 2020 Sharm El Sheikh | Clubs |
| Gold medal – first place | 2020 Sharm El Sheikh | Ball |
| Gold medal – first place | 2020 Sharm El Sheikh | Ribbon |
| Gold medal – first place | 2020 Sharm El Sheikh | Hoop |
| Gold medal – first place | 2023 Moka | Team |
| Gold medal – first place | 2023 Moka | All-Around |
| Silver medal – second place | 2016 Walvis Bay | All-around |
| Silver medal – second place | 2018 Cairo | Ball |
| Silver medal – second place | 2018 Cairo | Ribbon |
| Silver medal – second place | 2024 Kigali | Ball |
| Silver medal – second place | 2024 Kigali | Clubs |
| Bronze medal – third place | 2018 Cairo | Hoop |
| Bronze medal – third place | 2018 Cairo | Clubs |
| Bronze medal – third place | 2024 Kigali | All-Around |
| Bronze medal – third place | 2024 Kigali | Hoop |

Habiba Marzouk (Arabic: حبيبة مرزوق; born May 14, 2002) is an Egyptian retired individual rhythmic gymnast who represented Egypt at international competitions and Wadi Degla SC in national competitions.

== Career ==
Marzouk began gymnastics as a hobby at the age of 3.

=== Junior ===
She joined the Egyptian junior group at the age of 14 to compete in the 2016 African Rhythmic Gymnastics Championship, where she won the all-around silver medal.

=== Senior ===
In 2018, Marzouk competed in the African Rhythmic Gymnastics Championship, where she won 2 gold, 2 silver, and 2 bronze medals in the all-around. She also represented Egypt at the 2018 Mediterranean Games in Tarragona, Spain and placed 14th in the all-around qualification with a total score of 47.550.

She competed at her first World Championships in September, where she finished in 59th place. In December of the same year, she participated in the Luxembourg Rhythmic Gymnastics Championship and won two bronze medals in the ribbon and clubs event finals.

In 2019, Marzouk finished in 58th place at the World Championships. In December, she participated in the Croatia International Rhythmic Gymnastics Championship and won a silver medal in ball and two bronze medals in hoop and clubs. She finished 4th at the championship as a whole.

On March 12–16, 2020, Marzouk competed in the 15th African Rhythmic Gymnastics Championship which were held in Sharm El Sheikh. She won the all-around gold medal with a total of 73.700 points and qualified to compete in the 2020 Olympic Games in Tokyo.

At the 2020 Olympic Games, Marzouk finished twenty-fifth in the qualification round for the individual all-around.

Marzouk represented Egypt at the 2023 World Championships in Valencia, Spain and took 55th place in the all-around qualifications.

She announced her retirement via Instagram on 28 October 2024.
