= Tikendra Dal Dewan =

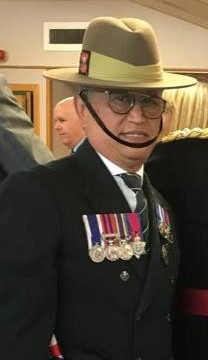
- Born: Tikendra Dal Dewan; June 18, 1953 (age 73); Kurseong, Darjeeling, India
- Education: Goethals Memorial School, Kurseong.
- Occupations: Ex-British Army Officer- Gurkha Major; CEO GnERGY; Social worker
- Known for: Chair of the British Gurkha Welfare Society (BGWS); Instrumental in the Gurkhas campaign for equality; Campaign for equal pensions for Ex-British Gurkha veterans
- Title: Ex-Major in the British Armed Forces; CEO of GnERGY
- Board member of: GnERGY; BGWS
- Spouse: Milan Dewan
- Children: 3

Tikendra Dal Dewan is an ex- British Army Gurkha, a Gurkha leader/social worker/activist campaigning for equal rights of British Gurkhas. Dewan served in the British Army for 31 years, United Kingdom Civil Services for eleven years and is the chairperson of the British Gurkha Welfare Society (BGWS) a welfare organisation for Gurkhas in the United Kingdom and Nepal and former CEO of Gnergy an energy company based in the UK run by retired British Gurkha veterans.

== Career ==
=== Army stations ===
Whilst in the British Army, Maj Dewan served in Hong Kong, Brunei, Cyprus, Belize, Nepal and United Kingdom.

=== Rank ===
Dewan joined the British Army as a regular soldier and rose the rank of major, the highest rank for a Gurkha officer, and retired in 2002.

=== Post army ===
After retiring from the British Armed forces, Dewan served in the British Civil services for eleven years before spearheading the energy company Gnergy as a CEO since 2013.

== Activism and social work ==
Dewan was instrumental in the Gurkhas campaign for equality in the United Kingdom when on May 21, 2009, all retired Gurkha soldiers were granted the right to live in Britain. According to Asia Times a critical speech of Dewan's resulted in public pressure that led to then Prime Minister Tony Blair finally relenting to the Gurkhas settlement rights in the UK.

Dewan was appointed a Governor in the Hampshire National Health Service (NHS) Council in December 2018 and Justice of Peace (JP): Magistrate for England and Wales, standing since January 2014 (North Hampshire Bench).

== Gurkha Justice and campaigns ==
Maj Dewan also heads the campaign for equal pensions for Ex-British Gurkha veterans. The legal and political campaign is over the fact that Gurkhas who retired before July 1, 1997, despite having won the right to settle in the UK with the assistance of Joanna Lumley's campaign, continue to receive much smaller pensions than their British counterparts. The pension inequality rule affects about 25,000 Gurkha veterans and the challenge was brought to court by BGWS on human rights and discrimination grounds. According to the UK Ministry of Defence (MOD) the ruling was "justified and proportionate" and not discriminatory on the grounds of age or nationality.

The UK MOD also argued the discrepancy is justified because of lower living costs in Nepal, although thousands of Gurkhas are UK residents.

The BGWS had taken the case to the European Court of Human Rights (ECHR) in Strasbourg, France which got rejected in 2016. Dewan and BGWS continue to fight for equality and justice for the retired Gurkhas.

== BGWS ==
BGWS is the first and the largest ex-Gurkha veterans organisation established in the UK to fight for Gurkha Justice and the welfare of ex-Gurkhas.

== Achievements and awards ==
- Gold Asian Achievers Award (UK), 2011 in community service, the first Nepali to receive this award.
- The OCU Commander's award for community relations in 2014.
- Hampshire Constabulary Award in 2009
- Don Allen Award Service to Education 2014
- The Nepali Media UK- One of the top ten Nepali personalities in the UK in 2013.
- CEO of the year 2013 for Hampshire by the CEO review magazine.
- First Nepali Justice of Peace (JP): Magistrate for England and Wales, standing since January 2014 (North Hampshire Bench)

== See also ==
- Brigade of Gurkhas
- Gurkha
- British Army
- Ministry of Defence (United Kingdom)
- Khukuri
- List of British Army regiments
