= Parijat Kusum Chakma =

Bangladeshi academic and politician

Parijat Kusum Chakma 𑄛𑄢𑄨𑄎𑄖𑄴 𑄇𑄧𑄥𑄪𑄟𑄴 𑄌𑄋𑄴𑄟𑄳𑄦

Member of Parliament for Rangamati
- In office 19 March 1996 – 30 March 1996
- Preceded by: Dipankar Talukdar
- Succeeded by: Dipankar Talukdar

Personal details
- Born: 1946
- Died: 28 March 1998 (aged 51)
- Party: Bangladesh Nationalist Party

Parijat Kusum Chakma (Bengali: পরিজাত কুসুম চাকমা, Chakma: 𑄛𑄢𑄨𑄎𑄖𑄴 𑄇𑄧𑄥𑄪𑄟𑄴 𑄌𑄋𑄴𑄟𑄳𑄦; 1946 – 28 March 1998) was a Bangladeshi academic and politician from Rangamati belonging to Bangladesh Nationalist Party. He was a member of the Jatiya Sangsad.

== Biography ==
Parijat Kusum Chakma was born in 1946 in Rangamati. He graduated in 1969. He was a teacher of Shah High School and Rupkari High School. He was the headmaster of Kachalong High School too.

Parijat was elected as a member of Rangamati Hill District Council in 1989. He was elected as a chairman of Rangamati Hill District Council in 1992. He was elected as a member of the Jatiya Sangsad from Rangamati in the Sixth General Election of Bangladesh.

Parijat died on 28 March 1998 at the age of 51.
