= Salma Saleh =

Egyptian rhythmic gymnast

- Born: 19 December 2003 (age 22) Cairo, Egypt

Gymnastics career
- Country represented: Egypt
Medal record
African Championships
Gold medal – first place	2016 Walvis Bay	5 balls
Gold medal – first place	2016 Walvis Bay	5 hoop
Gold medal – first place	2016 Walvis Bay	5-hoop + 5-ball
Gold medal – first place	2020 Sharm El Sheikh	All-around
Gold medal – first place	2020 Sharm El Sheikh	5 balls
Gold medal – first place	2020 Sharm El Sheikh	3 hoops + 2 clubs

Salma Saleh (born 19 December 2003) is an Egyptian rhythmic gymnast. She was a part of the team that represented Egypt in the 2016 and 2020 African Championships. She also represented Egypt at the 2020 Summer Olympics.

== Career ==
Saleh is a member of the Egyptian Gymnastics Federation. On 28 August – 3 September 2016, Saleh competed for Egypt in the junior group events at the 13th African Rhythmic Gymnastics Championships which were held in Walvis Bay, winning three gold medals in the 5-hoop events, in the 5-ball events and in the 5-hoop + 5-ball event.

On 10 to 15 March 2020, she competed in the group events at the 15th African Rhythmic Gymnastics Championships which were held in Sharm El Sheikh, winning three gold medals in the All-Around events, 5-balls events and in 3-hoops + 2-clubs events which qualified her to 2020 Summer Olympics in Tokyo, Japan.

She was selected to represent Egypt at the 2020 Summer Olympics alongside Login Elsasyed, Polina Fouda, Malak Selim, and Tia Sobhy. They finished thirteenth in the qualification round for the group all-around.
