= Malak Selim =

Egyptian rhythmic gymnast (born 2003)

- Full name: Malak Selim Sharif
- Born: 1 May 2003 (age 23) Giza, Egypt

Gymnastics career
- Discipline: Rhythmic gymnastics
- Country represented: Egypt
Medal record
African Championships
Gold medal – first place	2020 Sharm El Sheikh	All-around
Gold medal – first place	2020 Sharm El Sheikh	5 balls
Gold medal – first place	2020 Sharm El Sheikh	3 hoops + 2 clubs

Malak Selim Sharif (born 1 May 2003) is an Egyptian rhythmic gymnast. She is a three-time senior African champion, and she represented Egypt at the 2020 Summer Olympics. At the junior level, she won three gold medals at the 2016 African Championships.

== Career ==
In 2016, Selim participated with the junior Egyptian group in the African Rhythmic Gymnastics Championships, which was held in Walvis Bay, Namibia. They won the group all-around title, and they also won both apparatus finals. In 2017, she was a member of the silver-winning Egyptian national junior rhythmic gymnastics team who represented Egypt in the International Rhythmic Gymnastics Tournament held in Luxembourg.

Selim became age-eligible to join the senior group in 2019. In 2020, she participated in the group events at the 15th African Rhythmic Gymnastics Championships which held in Sharm El Sheikh, Egypt, and they won the group all-around title to qualify for the Olympic Games. They also won both apparatus finals. This also marked the first time an African nation qualified for the Olympic rhythmic gymnastics group event.

Selim competed with the Egyptian group at the 2021 Baku World Cup, and they placed 13th in the group all-around. They did not advance into either apparatus final. She was selected to represent Egypt at the 2020 Summer Olympics in Tokyo alongside Login Elsasyed, Polina Fouda, Salma Saleh, and Tia Sobhy. They finished thirteenth out of the fourteen groups in the qualification round for the group all-around. They did not advance into the final.
