= Subimal Dewan =

Bangladeshi social worker and politician

- সুবিমল দেওয়ান

Personal details
- Born: 1915 or 1916 Juraichhari, Rangamati
- Died: 2 July 2009 (aged 93) Rangamati, Bangladesh
- Party: Bangladesh Nationalist Party
- Children: 4 sons, 4 daughters (including Dipen Dewan)

Subimal Dewan (Bengali: সুবিমল দেওয়ান, Bengali pronunciation: [ʃubimɔl deoan]; died 2 July 2009) was a Bangladeshi social worker, development worker and politician. He was an advisor to President Ziaur Rahman on tribal affairs.

== Early life ==
Dewan was born in 1916 at Chokpati Ghat in Juraichhari, Rangamati. His son Dipen Dewan is a district convener of the Bangladesh Nationalist Party.

== Career ==
Dewan was appointed as an advisor on Chittagong Hill Tract affairs to then President Ziaur Rahman in 1980. He was the president and central vice president of FPAB Rangamati District from 1977 to 1999. He was also the president of Rangamati Disability School and Bangladesh Special Olympics, Rangamati branch. For his outstanding contribution to the society, he received awards from Rangamati Hill District Council including National Social Welfare Award, Family Planning Association of Bangladesh Award.

== Death ==
Dewan died on 2 July 2009.
