= Mariam Selim =

Egyptian rhythmic gymnast (born 2002)

- Born: 24 October 2002 (age 23) Alexandria, Egypt
- Height: 157 cm (5 ft 2 in)

Gymnastics career
- Discipline: Rhythmic gymnastics
- Country represented: Egypt
- Club: Smouha SC
- Head coaches: Sarah Ismail, Mayar Rajab, Mai Essam

Mariam Selim (born 24 October 2002) is an Egyptian former rhythmic gymnast.

== Personal life ==
Mariam Selim was born on October 24, 2002, in Alexandria. She began rhythmic gymnastics at age three because her sister was also a rhythmic gymnast. She can speak Arabic, English, and French.

== Career ==
Selim competed as a junior in the 2016 African Rhythmic Gymnastics Championships in Walvis Bay, where she won five gold medals.

She competed as a senior at the 2018 African Rhythmic Gymnastics Championships in Cairo, and she won gold medals in the team, hoop, ball, and ribbon, and a silver medal in the individual all-around. At the 2018 World Championships, Selim finished 61st in the all-around in the qualification round and the Egyptian team finished 25th. She competed at the 2019 FIG World Challenge Cup in Minsk where she finished 50th in the individual all-around. At the 2019 World Championships, she finished 69th in the all-around and the Egyptian team finished 28th.

At the 2020 African Rhythmic Gymnastics Championships in Sharm el-Sheikh, she won a gold medal in the team event and silver medals in the individual all-around, ribbon, hoop, and clubs. However, she was subsequently stripped of the medals she won at the event due to failing a doping test due to the presence of sibutramine. She was suspended from competing for two years beginning on July 10, 2020.

Selim announced her retirement from gymnastics on December 3, 2024.
