= Kamini Mohan Dewan =

Bangladeshi politician (1890–1976)

Kamini Mohan Dewan 𑄇𑄟𑄨𑄚𑄨 𑄟𑄮𑄦𑄧𑄚𑄴 𑄘𑄬𑄃𑄮𑄠𑄚𑄴
- Born: 1890
- Died: 1976 (aged 85–86)
- Occupation: Politician
- Relatives: Binoy Kumar Dewan (son)

Kamini Mohan Dewan (1890 – 1976) was a Bangladeshi politician from Rangamati. He was elected as a member of the East Bengal Legislative Assembly in 1954. His son Binoy Kumar Dewan served as the state minister of the Ministry of Local Government, Rural Development and Co-operatives.

== Biography ==
Dewan was born in 1890. He founded Parbatya Chattagram Janasamiti in 1920. Later, he established Hill Tracts People Organization in 1950. He was elected as a member of the East Bengal Legislative Assembly in 1954.

Dewan died in 1976. He wrote an autobiography titled Parbotya Chattagramer Din Seboker Jibon Kahini.
