= Azra Dewan =

South African rhythmic gymnast

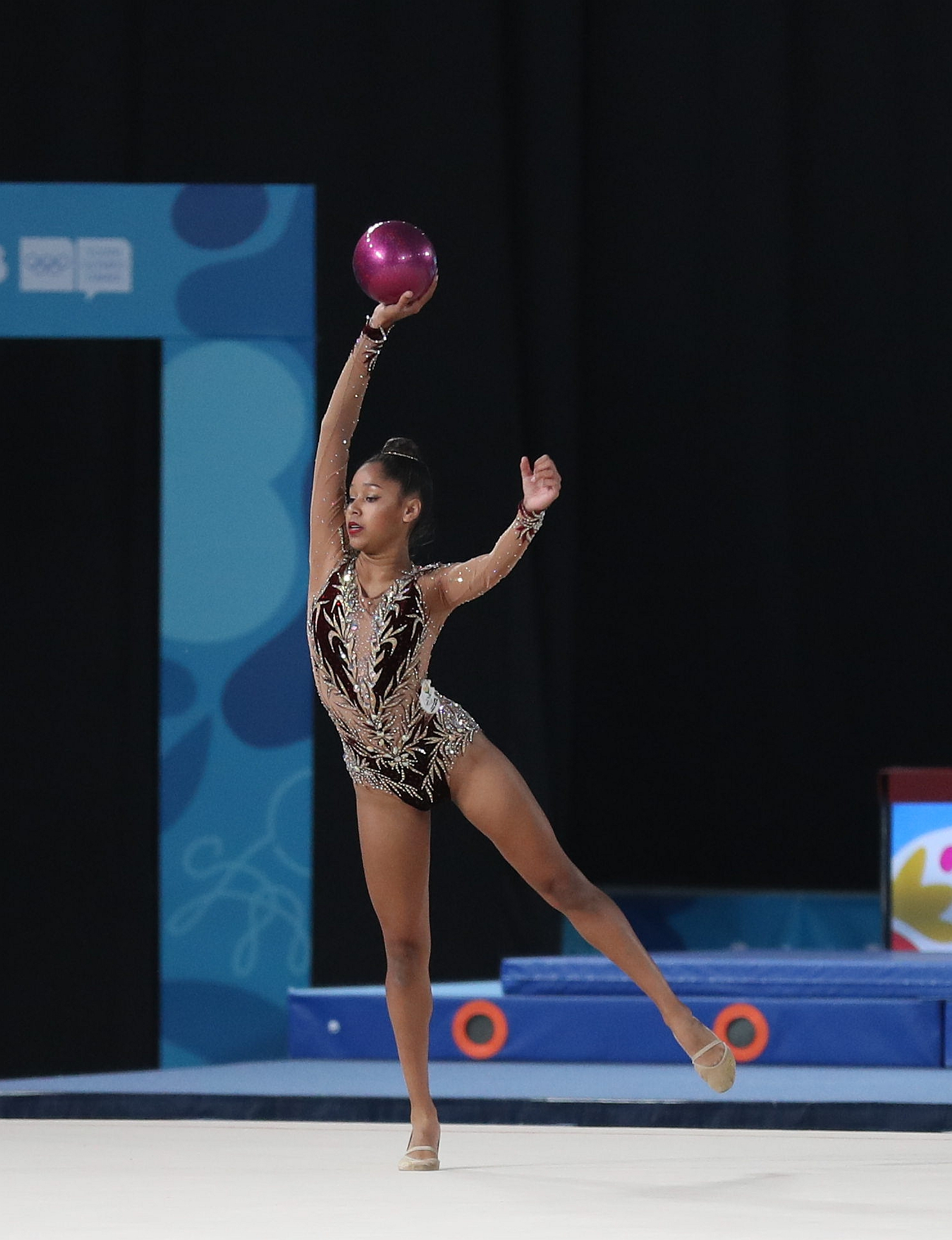
- Dewan in 2018

Personal information
- Born: 4 February 2003 (age 23)

Gymnastics career
- Discipline: Rhythmic gymnastics
- Country represented: South Africa (2018-)
- Club: Ocean Rhythmic Gymnastics / Evolution Rhythmic Gymnastics Academy
- Head coach: Robyn Mueller
Medal record
Rhythmic Gymnastics
Representing South Africa
African Championships
Silver medal – second place	2020 Cairo	Team
Silver medal – second place	2023 Moka	Team
Bronze medal – third place	2018 Cairo	Ball
Bronze medal – third place	2018 Cairo	Clubs
Bronze medal – third place	2023 Moka	Ribbon

Azra Dewan (born 4 February 2003) is a South African rhythmic gymnast. She represented her country at the 2018 Youth Olympics and is a multiple African Championships' medalist.

== Personal life ==
Dewan took up the sport at age eight, in 2018 she was named Junior Rhythmic Gymnast of the Year by the South African Gymnastics Federation.

== Career ==
In April 2018 she competed at the junior African Championships in Cairo, taking 4th place in the All-Around and earning a spot for the YOG, 5th with hoop and ribbon and winning bronze with ball and clubs. In October she competed at the Youth Olympic Games in Buenos Aires finishing qualification in 32nd place and not reaching the final, as a member of team Rosie MacLennan she finished 11th in the mixed competition.

After becoming a senior she took part in the World Cup in Portimão being 33rd in the All-Around, 30th with hoop, 33rd with ball, 33rd with clubs and 32nd with ribbon. She was later selected for the World Championships in Baku where she competed with clubs and ribbon, ending 38th in teams, 146th with clubs and 148th with ribbon.

In March 2020, before the season was cut short because of the COVID-19 pandemic, she was 8th in the All-Around, 5th with hoop, 9th with ball and with clubs, 4th with ribbon and won silver in teams at the African Championships in Cairo.

Dewan made her international comeback in 2023, competing at the African Championships in Moka where she won silver in teams and bronze with clubs. In late August she represented South Africa at the 2021 Summer World University Games in Chengdu finishing 24th.
