= Binoy Kumar Dewan =

Bangladeshi politician (1925–2021)

Minister of State for Local Government, Rural Development and Co-operatives
- In office 25 May 1986 – 26 March 1988

Member of Parliament for Rangamati
- In office 1986–1990
- Preceded by: Constituency Established
- Succeeded by: Dipankar Talukdar

Personal details
- Born: 9 March 1925 Rangamati, British India
- Died: 21 July 2021 (aged 96) Patharghata, Rangamati, Bangladesh
- Party: Jatiya Party
- Relatives: Kamini Mohan Dewan (father)

Binoy Kumar Dewan (9 March 1925 – 21 July 2021) was a Bangladeshi politician from Rangamati belonging to Jatiya Party. He was a former member of the Jatiya Sangsad. He was a state minister of the Ministry of Local Government, Rural Development and Co-operatives too. He was also appointed an advisor of the President of Bangladesh.

== Biography ==
Dewan was born on 9 March 1925 in Rangamati. His father Kamini Mohan Dewan was elected as a member of the East Bengal Legislative Assembly in 1954.

Dewan was elected as a member of the Jatiya Sangsad from Rangamati in 1986. Later, he served as state minister of the Ministry of Local Government, Rural Development and Co-operatives from 25 May 1986 to 26 March 1988. He was appointed an advisor of the President of Bangladesh in 1987. He was also elected as a member of the Jatiya Sangsad from Rangamati in 1988.

Binoy Kumar Dewan died on 21 July 2021 in Patharghata, Rangamati.
