= Yasmine Rostom =

Egyptian rhythmic gymnast

- Full name: Yasmine Mohmed Abdulmagid Rostom
- Born: July 25, 1993 (age 33) Alexandria, Egypt

Gymnastics career
- Discipline: Rhythmic gymnastics
- Country represented: Egypt; (2001 - 2013)
- Club: Al-Iskanderiya
Medal record
Representing Egypt
Rhythmic Gymnastics
African Championships
Gold medal – first place	2010 Walvis Bay	Team
Silver medal – second place	2010 Walvis Bay	Rope

Yasmine Mohmed Abdulmagid Rostom (Arabic: ياسمين محمد عبد المجيد رستم; born 25 July 1993 in Alexandria) is an Egyptian Olympic rhythmic gymnast.

== Career ==
Rostom competed at the 2009 World Championships in Mie, Japan, where she finished 111th in all-around qualifications. In 2010, she competed at the World Championships in Moscow, finishing 77th individually in qualifications, and 29th with the Egyptian team. At the 2011 World Championships in Montpellier, France, she finished 66th individually in qualifications, and 21st with the Egyptian team.

Rostom won the African Gymnastics Championships, thus qualifying to the 2012 Olympic Games in London. At London 2012, she finished 23rd out of 24 competitors in the individual all-around, ahead of Great Britain's Francesca Jones. Rostom is the first Egyptian to compete in rhythmic gymnastics at the Olympics.

In 2013, Rostom competed at the World Championships in Kyiv, placing 72nd in all-around qualifications.

== Personal life and family ==
Rostom's younger sister, Sara Rostom, is also a rhythmic gymnast.
