= Grace Legote =

South African rhythmic gymnast

- Full name: Grace Matsetsa Legote
- Born: 2 May 1992 (age 34) Delareyville, North West province, South Africa
- Height: 169 cm (5 ft 7 in)

Gymnastics career
- Discipline: Rhythmic gymnastics
- Country represented: South Africa
- College team: Centurion Academy
- Assistant coach: Tatiana Lavrentchouk-Vizer
Medal record
Rhythmic gymnastics
Representing South Africa
African Gymnastics Championships
Gold medal – first place	2014 Tshwane	All-around
Gold medal – first place	2014 Tshwane	Ball
Gold medal – first place	2014 Tshwane	Clubs
Gold medal – first place	2014 Tshwane	Ribbon
Gold medal – first place	2014 Tshwane	Team
Silver medal – second place	2012 Pretoria	Team
Silver medal – second place	2012 Pretoria	Ribbon
Silver medal – second place	2014 Tshwane	Hoop
Bronze medal – third place	2012 Pretoria	All-Around
Bronze medal – third place	2012 Pretoria	Hoop
Bronze medal – third place	2012 Pretoria	Ball

Grace Matsetsa Legote (born 2 May 1992 in Delareyville, North West province, South Africa) is a South African rhythmic gymnast.

== Personal life ==
Legote speaks Afrikaans, English, Russian and Zulu. She studied sports management at Centurion Academy in South Africa.

== Gymnastics career ==
Legote started training in rhythmic gymnastics at age 11, after her coach, Tatiana Lavrentchouk-Vizer, spotted her at a summer camp. She began representing South Africa internationally in 2009.

2009-2012

Legote competed at the 2009 Mie World Championships finishing 117th in the all-around qualifications. She competed at the 2010 Moscow World Championships finishing 107th in the all-around qualifications. She competed at the 2011 Montpellier World Championships finishing 100th in the all-around qualifications. Legote did not compete at the 2012 London Olympics. She was named Klerksdorp Sportswoman of the Year in 2011 and 2012.

2013-2016

Legote competed at the 2013 Summer Universiade in Kazan, Russia. At the 2013 Kyiv World Championships, she placed 55th in the all-around qualifications and was the highest ranked gymnast from Africa.

In March 2014, Legote competed at the African Championships in rhythmic gymnastics where she won the all-around title. In the event finals, she won 3 gold medals (ball, clubs, ribbon) and a silver in hoop. At the 2014 Commonwealth Games, she was a member of the South African team and finished tenth in the individual all-around finals. Legote competed at the 2014 Izmir World Championships placing 62nd in all-around qualifications.

In 2015, Legote began the season competing at the 2015 Moscow Grand Prix finishing 31st in the all-around. At the 2015 World Cup Final in Kazan, Legote finished 40th in the all-around. On September 9–13, Legote competed at the 2015 World Championships in Stuttgart finishing 64th in the All-around qualifications and did not advance into the Top 24 finals.

In 2016, Legote started her season competing at the 2016 Grand Prix Moscow finishing 33rd in the all-around. On July 8–10, Legote then finished 27th in the all-around at the 2016 Kazan World Cup.

She did not compete at the 2016 Olympics, despite being the top qualifier from Africa at the 2015 World Championships. Instead, the wild card berth was given to Cape Verde gymnast Elyane Boal. Legote's coach, Tatiana Lavrentchouk-Vizer, stated that "It has taken 13 years to develop and cultivate Grace into Africa's top rhythmic gymnast...this news has taken us by a surprise and is indeed very sad."

In September 2016, Legote competed at the African Championships, winning four gold medals and one silver.

2017-

Legote had her highest-ever world championships placement at the 2017 Pesaro World Championships, finishing 54th in the all-around qualifications and 26th in ribbon qualifications. At The World Games 2017 in Wroclaw, Legote's highest finished was 20th with ball.

In 2018, Legote competed at the 2018 Moscow Grand Prix finishing 26th in the all-around. She also competed at the African Championships, finishing fourth in the all-around and winning a gold in clubs, silver in hoop, and bronzes in ball and ribbon.
