= Gymnastics at the 2022 Commonwealth Games – Women's rhythmic individual all-around =

Women's rhythmic individual all-around at the 2022 Commonwealth Games
- Venue: Arena Birmingham
- Dates: 4 August 2022 (qualification); 5 August 2022 (final)
- Competitors: 29 from 13 nations
- Winning score: 112.300

Medalists
gold medal	Marfa Ekimova	England
silver medal	Anna Sokolova	Cyprus
bronze medal	Alexandra Kiroi-Bogatyreva	Australia

The Women's rhythmic individual all-around gymnastics competition at the 2022 Commonwealth Games in Birmingham, England was held on 5 August 2022 at the Arena Birmingham.

== Schedule ==
The schedule was as follows:

All times are British Summer Time (UTC+1)

Date	Round
Thursday 4 August 2022	Qualification
Friday 5 August 2022	Final

== Results ==
=== Qualification ===
Qualification for this all-around final was determined in parallel with the team final.

Place	Name	Hoop (rhythmic gymnastics)	Ball (rhythmic gymnastics)	Clubs (rhythmic gymnastics)	Ribbon (rhythmic gymnastics)	Total	Notes
1	Anna Sokolova (CYP)	28.800	27.850	28.200	28.100	112.950	Q
2	Carmel Kallemaa (CAN)	28.300	26.650	29.700	27.000	111.650	Q
3	Alexandra Kiroi-Bogatyreva (AUS)	26.000	29.100	29.300	26.600	111.000	Q
4	Marfa Ekimova (ENG)	28.950	28.000	26.000	26.000	108.750	Q
5	Izzah Amzan (MAS)	27.500	26.800	27.100	24.300	105.700	Q
6	Alice Leaper (ENG)	26.700	26.300	26.700	25.600	105.300	Q
7	Suzanna Shahbazian (CAN)	26.300	27.350	26.000	25.450	105.100	Q
8	Gemma Frizelle (WAL)	27.650	27.300	26.700	23.250	104.900	Q
9	Ng Joe Ee (MAS)	24.600	28.600	23.100	28.000	104.300	Q
10	Lidia Iakovleva (AUS)	26.900	26.050	26.900	24.350	104.200	Q
11	Louise Christie (SCO)	25.300	25.050	27.650	25.900	103.900	Q
12	Saffron Severn (ENG)	25.600	24.700	27.400	25.400	103.100	
13	Ashari Gill (AUS)	25.700	26.300	25.800	25.200	103.000	
14	Tatiana Cocsanova (CAN)	28.300	27.900	25.100	21.200	102.500	
15	Koi Sie Yan (MAS)	26.700	25.900	23.950	25.750	102.300	
16	Havana Hopman (NZL)	26.200	23.400	27.000	25.250	101.850	Q
17	Paris Chin (NZL)	24.400	25.600	26.500	24.400	100.900	Q
18	Elizabeth Popova (WAL)	23.400	27.100	27.700	22.300	100.500	Q
19	Anastasia Pingou (CYP)	24.850	25.900	24.050	25.300	100.100	Q
20	Kayla Rondi (RSA)	22.100	21.950	24.400	23.800	92.250	Q
21	Neofyta Mavrikiou (CYP)	23.650	23.850	23.700	20.100	91.300	
22	Anna-Marie Ondaatje (SRI)	23.600	21.850	23.200	21.900	90.550	R1
23	Katelin Heng (SGP)	23.300	22.500	22.700	21.950	90.450	R2
24	Lauryn Carpenter (WAL)	23.000	23.250	22.600	20.100	88.950	
25	Kaitlyn Chia (SGP)	19.400	22.050	21.600	19.300	82.350	R3
26	Sophia Ho (SGP)	19.200	22.800	21.300	16.000	79.300	
27	Kylie Gaivizo (GIB)	19.700	20.100	17.900	16.400	74.100	
28	Bavleen Kaur (IND)	18.100	18.750	18.450	17.400	72.700	
29	Mie Alvarez (GIB)	17.100	18.400	19.000	15.100	69.600	

=== Final ===
The results are as follows:

Position	Gymnast	Hoop (rhythmic gymnastics)	Ball (rhythmic gymnastics)	Clubs (rhythmic gymnastics)	Ribbon (rhythmic gymnastics)	Total
1st place, gold medalist(s)	Marfa Ekimova (ENG)	28.850	28.000	28.350	27.100	112.300
2nd place, silver medalist(s)	Anna Sokolova (CYP)	28.700	27.800	28.000	27.600	112.100
3rd place, bronze medalist(s)	Alexandra Kiroi-Bogatyreva (AUS)	28.000	28.200	28.300	26.600	111.100
4	Izzah Amzan (MAS)	26.100	27.600	28.200	26.400	108.300
5	Ng Joe Ee (MAS)	26.700	27.700	26.700	27.100	108.200
6	Carmel Kallemaa (CAN)	27.300	26.350	27.100	27.000	107.750
7	Lidia Iakovleva (AUS)	28.600	26.750	27.600	24.200	107.150
8	Suzanna Shahbazian (CAN)	28.700	26.600	25.100	25.700	106.100
9	Havana Hopman (NZL)	26.700	25.300	27.300	25.800	105.100
10	Louise Christie (SCO)	27.000	25.700	27.600	24.300	104.600
11	Alice Leaper (ENG)	26.300	26.900	25.700	24.700	103.600
12	Elizabeth Popova (WAL)	26.400	26.600	25.500	24.250	102.750
13	Gemma Frizelle (WAL)	25.050	25.800	26.450	21.000	98.300
14	Paris Chin (NZL)	26.400	20.400	26.800	23.600	97.200
15	Anastasia Pingou (CYP)	24.400	24.500	24.400	22.900	96.200
16	Kayla Roundi (RSA)	23.000	24.400	23.800	23.400	94.600
