= Gymnastics at the 2022 Commonwealth Games – Women's rhythmic team all-around =

Squash competition

Women's rhythmic team all-around at the 2022 Commonwealth Games
- Venue: Arena Birmingham
- Dates: 4 August 2022
- Competitors: 21 from 7 nations
- Winning score: 272.950

Medalists
gold medal	Tatiana Cocsanova; Carmel Kallemaa; Suzanna Shahbazian	Canada
silver medal	Ashari Gill; Lidiia Iakovleva; Alexandra Kiroi-Bogatyreva	Australia
bronze medal	Marfa Ekimova; Alice Leaper; Saffron Severn	England

The women's rhythmic team all-around gymnastic competition at the 2022 Commonwealth Games in Birmingham, England, took place on August 4 at the Arena Birmingham. A total of 21 competitors from seven nations took part.

Canada won the gold medal with a score of 272.950, just over four points ahead of second place Australia (268.650). The host team, England, took the bronze medal with a score of 268.650, its first medal in the event since 2010.

== Schedule ==
The schedule was as follows:

Date	Round
Thursday 4 August 2022	Final

== Results ==
The finals results:

Rank	Team	Hoop (rhythmic gymnastics)	Ball (rhythmic gymnastics)	Clubs (rhythmic gymnastics)	Ribbon (rhythmic gymnastics)	Total
1st place, gold medalist(s)	Canada	82.900	81.900	55.700	52.450	272.950
1st place, gold medalist(s)	Tatiana Cocsanova	28.300	27.900	~~25.100~~	~~21.200~~	272.950
1st place, gold medalist(s)	Carmel Kallemaa	28.300	26.650	29.700	27.000	272.950
1st place, gold medalist(s)	Suzanna Shahbazian	26.300	27.350	26.000	25.450	272.950
2nd place, silver medalist(s)	Australia	78.600	81.450	82.000	26.600	268.650
2nd place, silver medalist(s)	Ashari Gill	25.700	26.300	25.800	~~25.200~~	268.650
2nd place, silver medalist(s)	Lidiia Iakovleva	26.900	26.050	26.900	~~24.350~~	268.650
2nd place, silver medalist(s)	Alexandra Kiroi-Bogatyreva	26.000	29.100	29.300	26.600	268.650
3rd place, bronze medalist(s)	England	81.250	54.100	80.100	51.600	267.050
3rd place, bronze medalist(s)	Marfa Ekimova	28.950	27.800	26.000	26.000	267.050
3rd place, bronze medalist(s)	Alice Leaper	26.700	26.300	26.700	25.600	267.050
3rd place, bronze medalist(s)	Saffron Severn	25.600	~~24.700~~	27.400	~~25.400~~	267.050
4	Malaysia	78.800	81.300	27.100	78.050	265.250
4	Koi Sie Yan	26.700	25.900	~~23.950~~	25.750	265.250
4	Ng Joe Ee	24.600	28.600	~~23.100~~	28.000	265.250
4	Izzah Amzan	27.500	26.800	27.100	24.300	265.250
5	Cyprus	53.650	77.600	75.950	53.400	260.600
5	Neofyta Mavrikiou	~~23.650~~	23.850	23.700	~~20.100~~	260.600
5	Anastasia Pingou	24.850	25.900	24.050	25.300	260.600
5	Anna Sokolova	28.800	27.850	28.200	28.100	260.600
6	Wales	74.050	77.650	77.000	23.250	251.950
6	Gemma Frizelle	27.650	27.300	26.700	23.250	251.950
6	Elizabeth Popova	23.400	27.100	27.700	~~22.300~~	251.950
6	Lauryn Carpenter	23.000	23.250	22.600	~~20.100~~	251.950
7	Singapore	42.700	67.350	65.600	41.250	216.900
7	Katelin Heng	23.300	22.500	22.700	21.950	216.900
7	Kaitlyn Chia	19.400	22.050	21.600	19.300	216.900
7	Sophia Ho	~~19.200~~	22.800	21.300	~~16.000~~	216.900
