= Lidiia Iakovleva (gymnast) =

Australian rhythmic gymnast

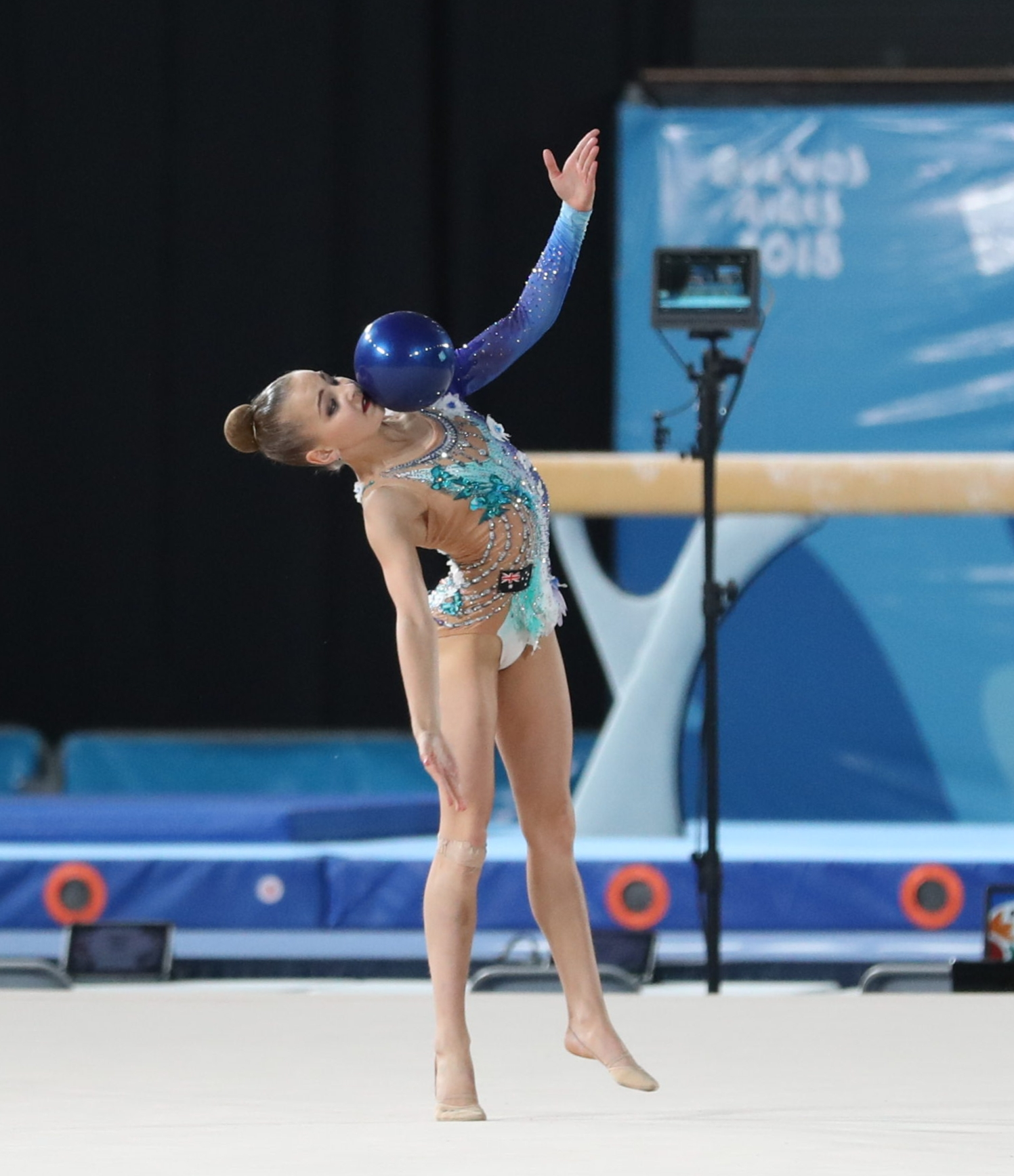
- Iakovleva at the 2018 Youth Olympic Games

Personal information
- Full name: Lidiia Anatolyevna Iakovleva
- Alternative name: Lidiya Yakovleva
- Nickname: Lida
- Born: 28 August 2003 (age 23) Petrozavodsk, Russia
- Height: 158 cm (5 ft 2 in)

Gymnastics career
- Discipline: Rhythmic gymnastics
- Country represented: Australia (2016-2025)
- Club: Aspire Gymnastics Academy
- Head coach: Iuliia Iakovleva
- Retired: no
Medal record
Representing Australia
Commonwealth Games
Silver medal – second place	2022 Birmingham	Team
Representing (International Olympic Committee) Mixed-NOCs team
Youth Olympic Games
Bronze medal – third place	2018 Buenos Aires	Mixed team

Lidiia Anatolyevna Iakovleva (Russian: Лидия Анатольевна Яковлева; born 28 August 2003) is a Russian-born Australian rhythmic gymnast who represented Australia at the 2020 Summer Olympics in the individual all-around. She represented Australia at the 2018 Summer Youth Olympics and won a bronze medal in the mixed multi-discipline team event. She won a silver medal in the team event at the 2022 Commonwealth Games. She competed at the 2024 Summer Olympics as part of Australia's rhythmic gymnastics group.

== Early life ==
Iakovleva was born in Petrozavodsk, Russia, and she began rhythmic gymnastics when she was five years old. She moved with her family to Australia when she was seven years old. She was coached by her mother, Iuliia Iakovleva, at Aspire Gymnastics Academy in Brisbane.

== Career ==
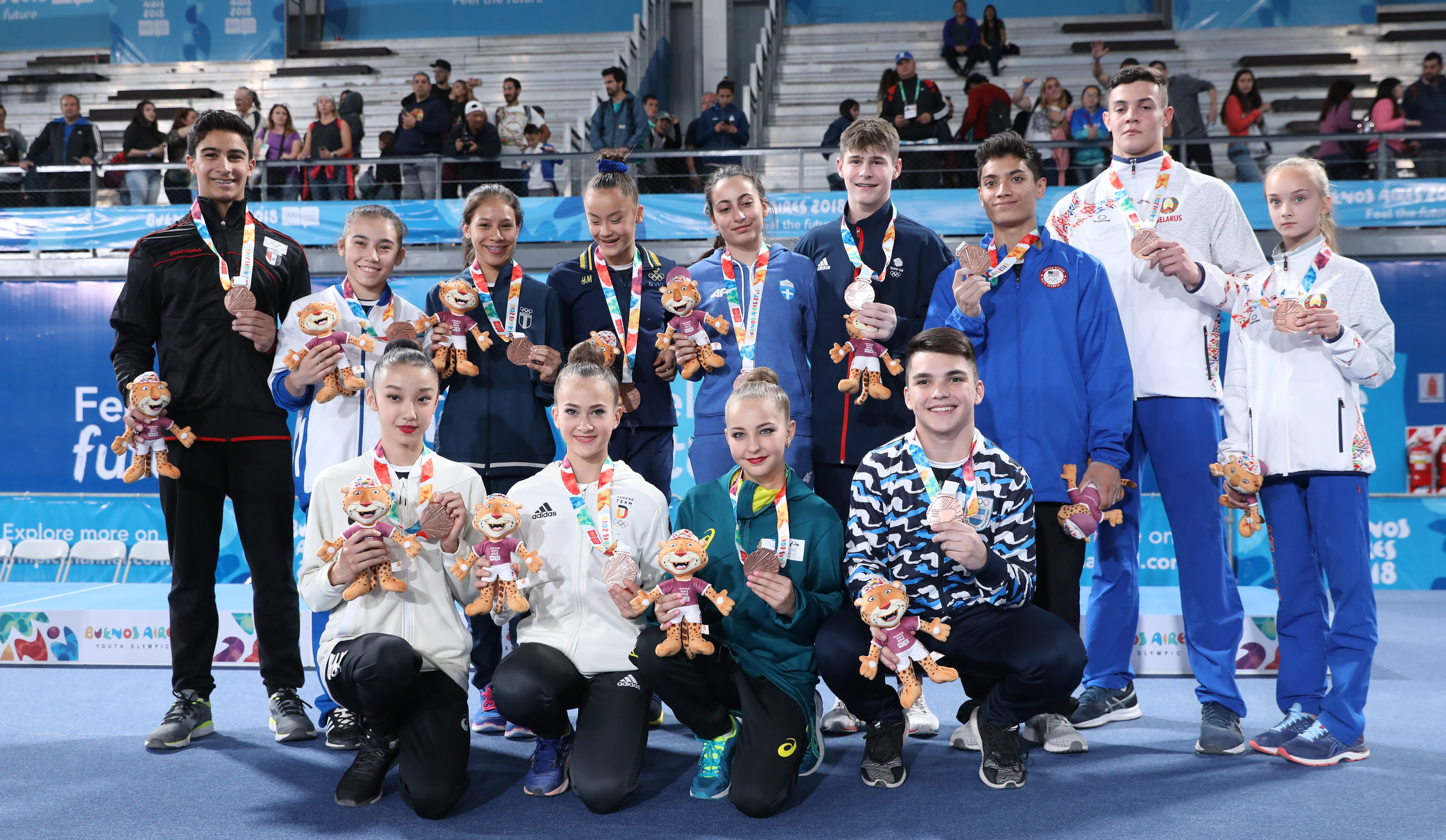
Iakovleva (bottom row, second from the right) and the bronze medal-winning mixed team at the 2018 Summer Youth Olympics

=== Junior ===
Iakovleva competed at the 2016 Pacific Rim Championships and won the bronze medal in clubs behind Lili Mizuno and Zhao Yating. She won the all-around at the Junior Australian Championships in 2016, 2017, and 2018. At the 2018 Youth Olympic Games, she finished 23rd in the all-around qualification round and won the bronze medal in the mixed multi-discipline team event.

=== Senior ===
==== 2019 ====
Iakovleva became eligible for senior competition in 2019. She finished 59th in the all-around at the Pesaro World Cup. Then at the World Challenge Cup in Kazan, she finished 47th in the all-around. She was selected to compete at the World Championships in Baku. The Australian team finished 13th, and she finished 65th in the all-around during the qualification round.

==== 2021 ====
Iakovleva competed at the 2021 Oceania Championships in Gold Coast, Queensland, which doubled as the Australian Championships and was an Olympic qualifier. She won the gold medal in the all-around and received the continental berth for the 2020 Olympic Games. After this qualification event, hosting organisations and officials were sanctioned for competition manipulations that lead to Iakovleva going to Tokyo; however, upon review by the International Gymnastics Federation the decision was found to be legitimate.

At the postponed 2020 Olympic Games, she finished 23rd in the qualification round for the individual all-around. Her total score of 78.775 was a personal best.

==== 2022 ====
In 2022, Iakovleva was awarded a Tier 3 scholarship for the Sport Australia Hall of Fame Scholarship and Mentoring Program. At the Athens World Cup, she placed 13th in the all-around, and she qualified for the ribbon final where she finished seventh. She then placed 24th in the all-around at the Pesaro World Cup. She finished second in the all-around to Alexandra Kiroi-Bogatyreva at the Australian Championships.

Iakovleva was selected to represent Australia at the 2022 Commonwealth Games in Birmingham alongside Kiroi-Bogatyreva and Ashari Gill. The team won the silver medal behind Canada. Individually, she qualified for the all-around final and finished in seventh place. She also placed sixth in the hoop final.

==== 2023 ====
Iakovleva began competing with the Aspire Gymnastics Academy rhythmic gymnastics group in 2023. The group placed fifth in the all-around at the Tashkent World Cup. Additionally, they finished seventh in the 5 hoops final and sixth in the 3 ribbons + 2 balls final. The Aspire group was not selected for the 2023 World Championships, and their appeal to the National Sports Tribunal was dismissed.

==== 2024 ====
Iakovleva and the Aspire group won a silver medal and two bronze medals at the 2024 Aphrodite Cup. In May, she competed at 2024 European Championships in Budapest, Hungary, which also doubled as the 2024 Oceania Championships. The Aspire group won the all-around title and thus claimed the Oceania continental berth for the 2024 Summer Olympics.

Iakovleva was selected to represent Australia at the 2024 Summer Olympics in group rhythmic gymnastics alongside teammates Saskia Broedelet, Emmanouela Frroku, Phoebe Learmont, and Jessica Weintraub where they finished in 11th place during the qualification with 58.450. She became the first Australian to compete in both individual and group rhythmic gymnastics at the Olympic Games.

==== 2026 ====
In 2026, alongside a reformed Aspire group she was selected to represent Queensland at the Australian championships.
