= Phoebe Learmont =

Australian rhythmic gymnast

- Born: 23 June 2005 (age 21) Ipswich, Queensland

Gymnastics career
- Discipline: Rhythmic gymnastics
- Country represented: Australia
- Club: Aspire Gymnastics Academy
- Head coaches: Iuliia Iakovleva and Tania Belan

Phoebe Learmont (born 23 June 2005) is an Australian rhythmic gymnast who represents her country in international competitions.

== Career ==
Learmont took up gymnastics at age six, first as an artistic gymnast as she joined a cousin who was already involved in the sport, and then she followed one of her coaches into rhythmic. Her breakthrough year came in 2017, when she placed first in hoop, ball, clubs, ribbon and all around at the Australian titles.

She began competing with the Aspire Gymnastics Academy rhythmic gymnastics group in 2023. The group placed fifth in the all-around at the Tashkent World Cup. Additionally, they finished seventh in the 5 hoops final and sixth in the 3 ribbons + 2 balls final. They won a silver medal in the group all-around at the Australian Championships. The Aspire group was not selected for the 2023 World Championships, and their appeal to the National Sports Tribunal was dismissed.

Learmont and the Aspire group won a silver medal and two bronze medals at the 2024 Aphrodite Cup. In May they won two golds and one silver at the Sofia International Tournament, getting the chance to compete at the continental championships. The Oceanian Championships were held in Budapest along the European ones, there Phoebe, Jessica Weintraub, Liidia Iakovleva, Emmanouela Frroku and Saskia Broedelet won gold in the All-Around, thus earning the chance to represent Australia at the 2024 Olympic Games in Paris.
