= British Rhythmic Gymnastics Championships =

The British Rhythmic Gymnastics Championships is the most important national rhythmic gymnastics competition in the United Kingdom. It has been organised by the British Gymnastics Federation since 1976.

== Medalists ==
British Rhythmic Gymnastics Championships medalists
Year	Gold	Silver	Bronze
1976	Elizabeth Mann		
1977	Sharon Taylor		
1978	Sharon Taylor		
1979	Sharon Taylor		
1980	Sharon Taylor		
1981	Sharon Taylor		
1982	Frances Newman		
1983	Jacquie Leavy		
1984	Jacquie Leavy		
1985	Lorraine Priest		
1986	Lorraine Priest		
1987	Alitia Sands		
1988	Lisa Black		
1989	Alitia Sands		
1990	Alitia Sands		
1991	Viva Seifert		
1992	Alitia Sands		
1993	Debbie Southwick		
1994	Debbie Southwick		
1995	Jennifer Maguire		
1996	Alison Deehan		
1997	Sarah Mccann		
1998	Laura Mackie		
1999	Rebecca Jose		
2000	Rebecca Jose		
2001	Hannah Mckibbin		
2002	Rebecca Jose		
2003	Hannah Walker		
2004	Hannah Walker		
2005	Hannah Chappell		
2006	Francesca Jones		
2007	Francesca Jones		
2008	Francesca Fox		
2009	Francesca Jones		
2010	Francesca Jones		
2011	Francesca Jones		
2012	Francesca Jones		
2013	Laura Halford		
2014	Laura Halford		
2015	Laura Halford		
2016	Stephani Sherlock		
2017	Laura Halford		
2018	Laura Halford		
2019	Christianna Vitanova		
2020	Cancelled due to COVID-19		
2021	Cancelled due to COVID-19		
2022	Marfa Ekimova	Louise Christie	Alice Leaper
2023	Marfa Ekimova	Louise Christie	Elizabeth Popova
2024	Elizabeth Popova	Ioana Popova	Nicole Hill
2025	Marfa Ekimova	Nicole Hill	Elizabeth Popova
2026	Elizabeth Popova	Nicole Hill	Melissa Toma
