= Carmel Kallemaa =

Estonian-born Canadian rhythmic gymnast

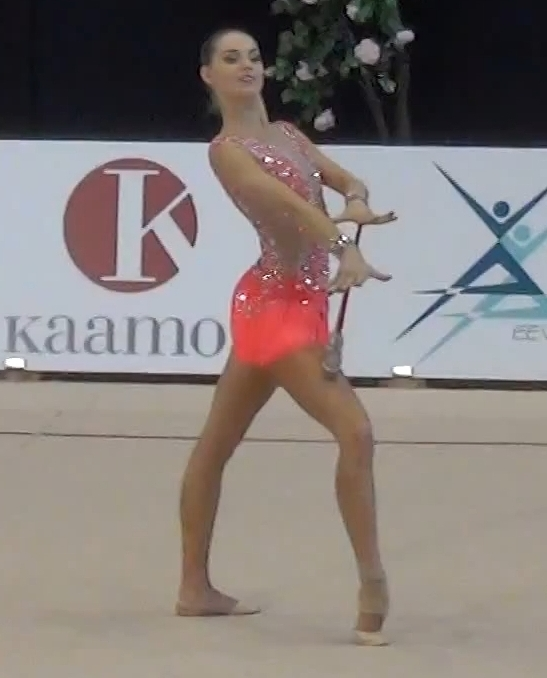

Personal information
- Born: 8 October 1997 (age 28) Tartu, Estonia

Gymnastics career
- Country represented: Canada (2019-)
- Former countries represented: Estonia
- Club: Glimmer Athletic Club
- Head coach: Janika Mölder
Medal record
Rhythmic gymnastics
Representing Canada
Commonwealth Games
| Gold medal – first place | 2022 Birmingham | Team |
| Silver medal – second place | 2022 Birmingham | Clubs |
| Bronze medal – third place | 2022 Birmingham | Hoop |
| Bronze medal – third place | 2022 Birmingham | Ribbon |
Pan American Championships
| Bronze medal – third place | 2022 Rio de Janeiro | Team |
| Bronze medal – third place | 2022 Rio de Janeiro | All-around |
| Bronze medal – third place | 2022 Rio de Janeiro | Clubs |
| Bronze medal – third place | 2023 Guadalajara | Team |
| Bronze medal – third place | 2024 Ciudad de Guatemala | Team |
| Bronze medal – third place | 2025 Asunción | Team |
Pacific Rim Championships
| Silver medal – second place | 2024 Cali | Team |

Carmel Kallemaa (born 8 October 1997) is an Estonian-born Canadian rhythmic gymnast. She is a Commonwealth Games champion and a Pan American Championships medalist.

== Life and career ==
Kallemaa was born in Tartu, Estonia. She moved to Ontario, Canada with her family in 2013. Her mother Janika Mölder was a gymnast, who competed for Soviet Union in group exercises at World and European Championships. Kallemaa took up rhythmic gymnastics at age two.

=== Competing for Estonia ===
Kallemaa represented Estonia internationally from 2013 until 2018.

==== 2016 Summer Olympics Cycle ====
Kallemaa competed at the 2013 World Games in Cali, Colombia, finishing 16th with ball and clubs, and 18th with hoop. In May 2014, she competed at the Koop Cup in Canada. At the 2014 World Championships in Izmir, she ranked 43rd all-around, after competing with ball, hoop and clubs. Alongside Viktoria Bogdanova and Olga Bogdanova Koop, she contributed to team Estonia's 16th place finish. In 2015, she competed at the Budapest World Cup Category B in all four apparatus and the all-around, finishing 38th. At the 2015 World Championships in Stuttgart, she ranked 58th all-around, competing with ball, clubs and ribbon. Again, her teammates were Viktoria Bogdanova and Olga Bogdanova, and they placed 18th as a team. In 2016, at the Olympic Test Event, Kallemaa placed 23rd in qualification. At the Baku World Cup Category B, she was ranked 20th all-around.

==== 2020 Summer Olympics Cycle ====
In 2017, at the Guadalajara World Challenge Cup, Kallemaa ranked 22nd in the all-around qualification. At the 2018 Guadalajara World Challenge Cup, she was 23rd all-around.

In December 2018 the International Gymnastics Federation approved her request to switch nationality from Estonia to Canada.

=== Competing for Canada ===
==== 2020 Summer Olympics Cycle ====
In 2019 Kallemaa competed as a member of Canada's rhythmic gymnastics group. In May at the Guadalajara World Challenge Cup, the group finished 11th. Part of Canada's group at the 2019 Pan American Games, Kallemaa finished off the podium. In September at the 2019 World Championships in Baku, the group was 20th in the all-around.

==== 2024 Summer Olympics Cycle ====
In 2021, Kallemaa returned to individual competition. At the 2021 Virtual Elite Canada in March, Kallemaa won the senior all-around title.

In January 2022, Kallemaa was named as an individual national team member. At the Rhythmic Gymnastics Canadian Championships in May 2022, Kallemaa competed as a group gymnast, winning gold. At the 2022 Pan American Gymnastics Championships Kallemaa competed as an individual gymnast and won bronze medals in the team, individual all-around and clubs events. She competed at the 2022 Commonwealth Games, winning a gold medal in the team all-around event alongside teammates Tatiana Cocsanova and Suzanna Shahbazian, a silver medal in the clubs event and bronze medals in the hoop and ribbon events.

At the 2023 Pan American Gymnastics Championships, Kallemaa won team bronze alongside teammates Tatiana Cocsanova and Suzana Shahbazian. She was sixth with clubs, seventh with ribbon, eighth all-around and with hoop. In August, she competed at the 2023 World Championships in Valencia, Spain, and took 44th place in all-around qualifications.

In 2024, together with Jana Alemam, Eva Cao, Tatiana Cocsanova, Suzanna Shahbazian and Kate Vetricean, she won silver medal in team competition at the 2024 Pacific Rim Championships in Cali, Colombia.

==== 2028 Summer Olympics Cycle ====
In 2025, she competed at Portimao World Challenge Cup and ended on 20th place in all-around. She won bronze medal in team competition alongside Pin Rong Lee and Suzanna Shahbazian at the 2025 Pan American Championships in Asunción, Paraguay.Team She took 7th place in Hoop, Clubs and Ribbon finals. In July, she competed at Cluj-Napoca World Challenge Cup and took 33rd place in all-around. She was selected to represent Canada at the 2025 World Championships in Rio de Janeiro, being the oldest competitor in the entire field. She took 53rd place in all-around qualifications and 18th place in team competition.

In 2026, she switched back to competing in group. In June, she and her teammates competed at the 2026 Pan American Championships in Rio de Janeiro. They took fourth place in all-around and both apparatus finals.

== Routine music information ==
| Year | Apparatus | Music title |
|---|---|---|
| 2025 | Hoop | Unforgettable by Safari Riot ft. Cara Salimando, Ave Maria by 2WEI and Ali Christenhusz |
| 2025 | Ball | Live and let die by Paul McCartney and Wings, The Name's Bond... James Bond by David Arnold |
| 2025 | Clubs | Lay All Your Love On Me by ABBA, Lay All Your Love On Me (from Mamma Mia!) by Dominic Cooper, Amanda Seyfried |
| 2025 | Ribbon | Adagio in G Minor by Tomaso Albinoni |
| 2024 | Hoop | Gangsta's Paradise by 2WEI, At Last by Etta James |
| 2024 | Ball (first) | Adagio of Spartacus and Phrygia by Aram Khachaturian, Feel This Moment by Pitbull ft. Christina Aguilera |
| 2024 | Ball (second) | The Pink Panther Theme by Henry Mancini, New York, New York by Frank Sinatra |
| 2024 | Clubs | Money, Money, Money by The Butterfly Effect, Money, Money, Money (from Mamma Mia!) by Meryl Streep, Julie Walters, Christine Baranski |
| 2024 | Ribbon | La Bamba (song) by Ritchie Valens |
| 2023 | Hoop | Suite No. 1: Les Toréadors (from Carmen) by Georges Bizet |
| 2023 | Ball | Clair de lune (story told by Carmel Kallemaa) by Claude Debussy |
| 2023 | Clubs | Does Your Mother Know (from Mamma Mia!) by Christine Baranski, Philip Michael |
| 2023 | Ribbon (first) | New York, New York (FWB Remix) by Ray Quinn (Friends with Benefits OST) |
| 2023 | Ribbon (second) | La Bamba (song) by Ritchie Valens |
| 2022 | Hoop (first) | Sugar Plum Raid by Benjamin Wallfisch |
| 2022 | Hoop (second) | Suite No. 1: Les Toréadors (from Carmen) by Georges Bizet |
| 2022 | Ball | Just The Way You Are by Barry White |
| 2022 | Clubs | Super Trouper (from Mamma Mia! Here We Go Again) by Meryl Streep, Julie Walters, Christine Baranski |
| 2022 | Ribbon | New York, New York (FWB Remix) by Ray Quinn (Friends with Benefits OST) |

== See also ==
- Nationality changes in gymnastics
