= Jessica Weintraub =

Australian rhythmic gymnast

- Born: 20 March 2007 (age 19) St Kilda East, Victoria, Australia

Gymnastics career
- Discipline: Rhythmic gymnastics
- Country represented: Australia
- Club: Aspire Gymnastics Academy
- Head coaches: Iuliia Iakovleva and Tania Belan

Jessica Weintraub (born 20 March 2007) is an Australian Olympic rhythmic gymnast. She represents Australia in international competitions. She competed for Australia at the 2024 Paris Olympics in the Women's rhythmic group all-around at the Adidas Arena on 9–10 August.

== Early life ==
Weintraub was born in East St Kilda, Australia, and is Jewish. She and her family relocated from Melbourne to Brisbane, Australia, when she was 14. She attends Brisbane State High School.

== Rhythmic gymnastics career ==
Weintraub trained at Prahran Rhythmic Gymnastics when she was a junior. Her family relocated so that Weintraub could join Aspire Gymnastics Academy to pursue her career in rhythmic gymnastics. At first she was focused in being successful as an individual gymnast, winning medals at nationals. Weintraub is coached by Iuliia Iakovleva and Tania Belan.

=== 2023 ===
Weintraub began competing with the Aspire Gymnastics Academy rhythmic gymnastics group in 2023. The group placed fifth in the all-around at the 2023 Tashkent World Cup. Additionally, they finished seventh in the 5 hoops final and sixth in the 3 ribbons + 2 balls final. They won a silver medal in the group all-around at the Australian Championships. The Aspire group was not selected for the 2023 World Championships, and their appeal to the National Sports Tribunal was dismissed.

=== 2024–present ===
Weintraub and the Aspire group won a silver medal and two bronze medals at the 2024 Aphrodite Cup. In May, they won two golds and one silver at the Sofia International Tournament, getting the chance to compete at the continental championships.

The Oceanian Championships were held in Budapest along the European ones. There, Weintraub, Phoebe Learmont, Liidia Iakovleva, Emmanouela Frroku and Saskia Broedelet won gold in the All-Around, thus earning the chance to represent Australia at the 2024 Paris Olympics.

==== 2024 Paris Olympics ====
Weintraub competed for Australia at the 2024 Paris Olympics in the Women's rhythmic group all-around at the Adidas Arena on 9–10 August, at 17 years of age. Australia's rhythmic group, composed of herself, Phoebe Learmont, Liidia Iakovleva, Emmanouela Frroku and Saskia Broedelet, placed the nation's best result yet, 11th.

== See also ==
- List of select Jewish gymnasts
