= Saskia Broedelet =

Australian rhythmic gymnast

- Born: 20 February 2004 (age 22) Auchenflower, Queensland

Gymnastics career
- Discipline: Rhythmic gymnastics
- Country represented: Australia; (2019-2026)
- Club: Aspire Gymnastics Academy
- Head coaches: Iuliia Iakovleva and Tania Belan
- Retired: yes

Saskia Broedelet (born 20 February 2004) is a retired Australian rhythmic gymnast. She represented Australia at the 2024 Summer Olympics in the group all-around.

== Early and personal life ==
Broedelet was born in 2004 in Auchenflower, Queensland. She began rhythmic gymnastics when she was five years old. As of 2024, she studies law at Queensland University of Technology, and she has a part-time job as a law clerk.

== Career ==
Broedelet trained at the Premier Gymnastics Academy in Brisbane during her junior career. She dislocated her knee and had surgery in 2019. Despite the injury, she still competed as an individual at the 2019 Junior World Championships in Moscow. She competed with the ball and the ribbon, placing 36th and 20th, respectively. Her routines contributed to Australia's 29th-place finish. She was also the 2019 Australian junior national all-around champion.

Broedelet became age-eligible for senior competitions in 2020. She placed fifth in the senior all-around at the 2021 Australian Championships and won a silver medal with the Queensland team. She won a bronze medal in the clubs final behind Alexandra Kiroi-Bogatyreva and Lidiia Iakovleva.

Broedelet began competing with the Aspire Gymnastics Academy rhythmic gymnastics group in 2023. The group placed fifth in the all-around at the Tashkent World Cup. Additionally, they finished seventh in the 5 hoops final and sixth in the 3 ribbons + 2 balls final. They won a silver medal in the group all-around at the Australian Championships. The Aspire group was not selected for the 2023 World Championships, and their appeal to the National Sports Tribunal was dismissed.

Broedelet and the Aspire group won a silver medal and two bronze medals at the 2024 Aphrodite Cup. In May, she competed at 2024 European Championships in Budapest, Hungary, which also doubled as the 2024 Oceania Championships. The Aspire group won the all-around title and thus claimed the Oceania continental berth for the 2024 Summer Olympics.

Broedelet was selected to represent Australia at the 2024 Summer Olympics in group rhythmic gymnastics alongside teammates Lidiia Iakovleva, Emmanouela Frroku, Phoebe Learmont, and Jessica Weintraub.
