= Gymnastics at the 2022 Commonwealth Games – Women's rhythmic individual ribbon =

Women's rhythmic individual ribbon at the 2022 Commonwealth Games
- Venue: Arena Birmingham
- Dates: 6 August 2022
- Competitors: 8 from 6 nations
- Winning score: 27.800

Medalists
gold medal	Ng Joe Ee	Malaysia
silver medal	Louise Christie	Scotland
bronze medal	Carmel Kallemaa	Canada

The Women's rhythmic individual ribbon gymnastics competition at the 2022 Commonwealth Games in Birmingham, England was held on 6 August 2022 at the Arena Birmingham.

== Schedule ==
The schedule was as follows:

All times are British Summer Time (UTC+1)

Date	Time	Round
Thursday 4 August 2022	12:00	Qualification
Saturday 6 August 2022	12:02	Final

== Results ==
=== Qualification ===
Qualification for this apparatus final was determined within the team final.

=== Final ===
The results are as follows:

Rank	Gymnast	Difficulty	Execution	Penalty	Total
1st place, gold medalist(s)	Ng Joe Ee (MAS)	13.100	7.100		27.800
2nd place, silver medalist(s)	Louise Christie (SCO)	11.400	8.000	-0.05	27.550
3rd place, bronze medalist(s)	Carmel Kallemaa (CAN)	11.600	7.900		27.500
4	Koi Sie Yan (MAS)	11.400	8.000		27.200
5	Alexandra Kiroi-Bogatyreva (AUS)	11.300	7.200		26.500
6	Marfa Ekimova (ENG)	11.400	8.000		25.700
7	Alice Leaper (ENG)	10.300	7.300		25.300
8	Anna Sokolova (CYP)	10.800	6.300		24.600
