= John Boultbee (sport administrator) =

Australian sports administrator

John Francis Boultbee AM (born 9 March 1950) is a lawyer and Australian sport administrator particularly in relation to rowing and football. In 1990, he was appointed a Member of the Order of Australia for services to rowing as an administrator. He was appointed the inaugural Chief Executive Officer of the National Sports Tribunal in March 2020.

== Personal ==
He was born in Orange, New South Wales on 9 March 1950. His parents are James Alan Boultbee OAM and Helen Laurine Boultbee. He came from a family interested in sport and he participated in athletics, diving and rowing growing up. At the age of 13 he became involved in rowing as a coxswain. This involvement was to lead to a long involvement in rowing. He attended Orange High School and Shore School. He completed at Bachelor of Laws (Hons) at University of Sydney and Master of Laws at University of London. After completing his legal studies, he worked in private practice as a barrister until 1989.

== Sports administration ==
=== Rowing ===
Between 1989 and 1995, he was Secretary General of the International Rowing Federation. He is currently a board member of the International Rowing Federation and Rowing Australia and Steward of the Henley Royal Regatta. Besides these current positions, he has had a long association with rowing in Australia as a cox, coach, national team manager and state councillor. His club association as a competitor (coxswain) and administrator (club secretary) was with the Sydney University Boat Club.

In December 2017, he was awarded FISA's Distinguished Service to International Rowing.

=== Australian Institute of Sport ===
He was the fifth Director of the Australian Institute of Sport from 1995 to 2001, succeeding Robert De Castella. While he was Director, he supervised the Olympic Athlete Program, which was largely responsible for Australia winning 58 medals and finishing 4th on the medal tally at the Sydney Olympics. He was not reappointed to the position and was replaced by Michael Scott.

=== Football ===
In 2004, he was appointed by Football Federation Australia to establish a high performance unit. He was responsible for overseeing the national teams including the Socceroos, Olyroos and Matildas. During this period, the Socceroos qualified for World Cups in Germany, South Africa and Brazil. He left the position in 2013 due to his desire to stand for the presidency of rowing's international governing body FISA.

=== Volleyball ===
From November 2014 to March 2020, he was Volleyball Australia's Director of High Performance which is responsible Australia's Volleyroos and Beach Volleyroos programs.

=== National Sports Tribunal ===
In March 2020, he was appointed the inaugural Chief Executive Officer of National Sports Tribunal.

=== International Organisations ===
Since 1996, he has been a judge of the Court of Arbitration for Sport. Since 2000, he has been a director of Australia for UNHCR Limited. In this role, he has been a strong advocate for the transformative sports programs UNHCR provides for young refugees, having observed these programs in refugee camps in Thailand.
