= 2019 Junior Pan American Rhythmic Gymnastics Championships =

International sports competition

The 2019 Junior Pan American Rhythmic Gymnastics Championships was held in Monterrey, Mexico, June 13–15, 2019.

== Medal summary ==
Event	Gold	Silver	Bronze
Team	United States; Jenna Zhao; Victoria Kobelev; Erica Foster	Canada; Elizabeth Savchenko; Michel Vivier; Suzanna Shahbazian; Tatiana Cocsanova	Mexico; Dalia Alcocer; Kimberly Salazar; Valeria Rodriguez
Individual all-around	Jenna Zhao (USA)	Victoria Kobelev (USA)	Elizabeth Savchenko (CAN)
Rope	Michel Vivier (CAN)	Victoria Kobelev (USA)	Dalia Alcocer (MEX)
Ball	Michel Vivier (CAN)	Jenna Zhao (USA)	Victoria Kobelev (USA)
Clubs	Michel Vivier (CAN)	Jenna Zhao (USA)	Dalia Alcocer (MEX)
Ribbon	Jenna Zhao (USA)	Michel Vivier (CAN)	Kimberly Salazar (MEX)
Group all-around	Mexico	Brazil	United States
5 hoops	Mexico	Brazil	United States
5 ribbons	Brazil	Mexico	Canada

== Medal table ==
Rank	Nation	Gold	Silver	Bronze	Total
1	United States	3	4	3	10
2	Canada	3	2	2	7
3	Mexico	2	1	4	7
4	Brazil	1	2	0	3
Totals (4 entries)		9	9	9	27
