= Elizabeth Popova =

British rhythmic gymnast

- Full name: Elizabeth Petrova Popova
- Born: 30 November 2006 (age 19) Carmarthen

Gymnastics career
- Discipline: Rhythmic gymnastics
- Country represented: Great Britain Wales
- Club: Llanelli Rhythmic Gymnastics Academy
- Head coach: Linda Thomas
- Assistant coach: Ioana Popova

Elizabeth Petrova Popova (born 30 November 2006) is a British rhythmic gymnast. She represents Great Britain and Wales in international competitions.

== Personal life ==
Her mother, Ioana, was a successful rhythmic gymnast and later served as national choreographer for Wales and worked with the Welsh Commonwealth Games teams in 1998 and 2002, as of 2026 she's a high performance rhythmic coach and national judge. Elizabeth's father, Petar, was a professional basketball player in Bulgaria and her older brother Chris is a footballer and, in February 2022, signed a professional contract with Premier League club Leicester City.

== Career ==
Popova took up the sport at age four.

=== Junior ===
In 2019 she became the Welsh junior champion and was selected, alongside Saffron Severn, for the 1st Junior World Championships in Moscow, being 34th with ball and 22nd with ribbon. In 2021 she was again crowned Welsh champion.

=== Senior ===
Popova became age eligible for senior competitions in 2022, debuting at the World Cup in Sofia where she was 36th in the All-Around, 38th with hoop, 38th with ball, 25th with clubs and 27th with ribbon. In June it was announced that she was selected to represent Wales at the Commonwealth Games alongside Gemma Frizelle and Lauryn Carpenter. In Birmingham she was 6th in teams, 12th overall, 7th with ball and 5th with clubs.

In early 2023 she competed in the Miss Valentine Grand Prix, being 15th. April she took part in the Portimão International Tournament, being 18th in the All-Around. In July she won bronze overall, behind Marfa Ekimova and Louise Christie, at the British Championships, also taking gold with hoop and ribbon as well as silver with ball and clubs.

Selected to perform with ball and ribbon at the 2024 European Championships in Budapest, she was 64th and 37th with the two apparatuses. Two month later she won gold in the all-around and hoop, while also securing silver in the ball, clubs, and ribbon at the British Championships.

In 2025 she started at the World Cup in Sofia, taking 66th place in the All-Around, 85th with hoop, 48th with ball, 55th with clubs and 52nd with ribbon. In June she was confirmed into the national team. At the British Championships she won bronze in the All-Around, behind Ekimova and Nicole Hill, and gold with hoop and ribbon.

At the 2026 Sofia World Cup she finished 67th in the All-Around, 59th with hoop, 74th with ball, 58th with clubs and 63rd with ribbon. In May she participated in the World Challenge Cup in Portimão, being 27th with hoop, 20th with ball, 25th with clubs and 34th with ribbon. She then competed with ball and clubs in the European Championships in Varna, taking 70th and 44th place with the apparatuses and 23rd in teams (with Hill, Melissa Toma and the national group). In July she became the British All-Around champion. The following month she was selected for her maiden senior World Championships in Frankfurt, being 62nd in the All-Around, 67th with hoop, 50th with ball, 52nd with clubs and 63rd with ribbon.

== Routine music information ==
Year	Apparatus	Music title
2026	Hoop	Катерино Моме by Ku-Ku Band
2026	Ball	Carmen by Marcin
2026	Clubs	She Bangs (English Version) by Ricky Martin
2026	Ribbon	La Grange (2019 Remastered) by ZZ Top
2025	Hoop	Катерино Моме by Ku-Ku Band
2025	Ball	Carmen by Marcin
2025	Clubs	
2025	Ribbon	La Grange (2019 Remastered) by ZZ Top
2024	Hoop	
2024	Ball	
2024	Clubs	
2024	Ribbon	
2023	Hoop	
2023	Ball	
2023	Clubs	
2023	Ribbon	
2022	Hoop	
2022	Ball	
2022	Clubs	
2022	Ribbon	
2019	Rope	
2019	Ball	I Put A Spell On You by Garou
2019	Clubs	I'm Trouble by Andy Powell
2019	Ribbon	Chopin Nocturne by David Garrett
