= Emmanouela Frroku =

Australian-Greek rhythmic gymnast

- Born: 31 July 2007 (age 19) Amarousio, Greece

Gymnastics career
- Discipline: Rhythmic gymnastics
- Country represented: Australia
- Club: Aspire Gymnastics Academy
- Head coaches: Iuliia Iakovleva and Tania Belan

Emmanouela Frroku (born 31 July 2007) is an Australian-Greek rhythmic gymnast. She represents her country in international competitions.

== Biography ==
Emmanouela first started rhythmic gymnastics as a five-years-old in Greece. Before her ninth birthday she had already won her first medal, a bronze at the Greek national championships.

She and her family moved to Australia (as her mother who has hails from Lesvos is an Australian citizen) after her parents lost their jobs in consequence of an economic crisis. Within a year of her relocation Emmanouela was winning Australian championship medals as a junior. At the 2022 Australian junior titles, she won gold medals in ball, ribbon and team. Frroku is of Albanian descent from his father's side.

In 2022 she was selected for the Australian national junior team. In December 2023 she integrated the senior group of the Aspire club. In early 2024 the group won a silver medal and two bronze medals at the 2024 Aphrodite Cup. In May they won two golds and one silver at the Sofia International Tournament, getting the chance to compete at the continental championships. The Oceanian Championships were held in Budapest along the European ones, there Emmanouela, Jessica Weintraub, Liidia Iakovleva, Phoebe Learmont and Saskia Broedelet won gold in the All-Around, thus earning the chance to represent Australia at the 2024 Olympic Games in Paris.
