= Olga Bogdanova (gymnast) =

Estonian gymnast (born 1994)

Olga Kööp
- Born: 24 December 1994 (age 31)

Gymnastics career
- Discipline: Rhythmic gymnastics
- Country represented: Estonia (Estonia)

Olga Kööp (née Bogdanova; born 24 December 1994) is a former Estonian rhythmic gymnast. She is a multiple-time national champion.

== Personal life ==
Her twin sister, Viktoria Bogdanova, is also a gymnast. Both were chosen among the most beautiful gymnasts in the world in 2013. After marriage, she changed her surname to Kööp.

In 2014, she graduated from Tallinn Baltic High School and in 2018 from Tallinn University, majoring in physical education (bachelor's degree). In 2019, she entered Tallinn University's master's program in physical education and graduated in 2021.

== Career ==
In 2012, Bogdanova became the Estonian champion with hoop, ball, ribbon and clubs. In 2014, she became the All-Around national champion. The Estonian Gymnastics Association chose her as the best gymnast of 2014. In 2015, Bogdanova competed in her fifth World Championships in Stuttgart, where she placed in the top 50. This guaranteed Estonia two places to get the opportunity to participate in the qualification competitions of the Olympic Games, which took place in Rio de Janeiro.

In 2017 Olga became national All-Around champion again. At the European Championships in Budapest, Olga finished 18th, thus securing a spot at the 2018 European Championships, where the top 24 entered the competition. In 2018, she won the Estonian Championship and participated in the World Cup stage in Tashkent, where she finished in 18th place. In the same year Olga opened a self-titled gymnastics club together with her twin sister Viktoria Bogdanova.

In 2021, Olga was elected as a member of the Estonian gymnastics committee.
