= Suzanna Shahbazian =

Canadian rhythmic gymnast

- Born: 18 October 2004 (age 21) Montreal, Quebec, Canada

Gymnastics career
- Discipline: Rhythmic gymnastics
- Country represented: Canada; (2019-)
- Club: Questo RG
- Head coach: Natalia Popova
Medal record
Rhythmic Gymnastics
Representing Canada
Commonwealth Games
Gold medal – first place	2022 Birmingham	Team
Silver medal – second place	2022 Birmingham	Ball
Pan American Gymnastics Championships
Silver medal – second place	2022 Rio de Janeiro	Hoop
Bronze medal – third place	2022 Rio de Janeiro	Team
Bronze medal – third place	2022 Rio de Janeiro	Ball
Bronze medal – third place	2023 Guadalajara	Team
Bronze medal – third place	2024 Ciudad de Guatemala	Team
Bronze medal – third place	2025 Asunción	Team
Pacific Rim Championships
Silver medal – second place	2024 Cali	Team
Bronze medal – third place	2024 Cali	Hoop
Bronze medal – third place	2024 Cali	Ball
Bronze medal – third place	2024 Cali	Ribbon

Suzanna Shahbazian (born 18 October 2004) is a Canadian rhythmic gymnast. She is a 2022 Commonwealth Games team gold medalist and ball silver medalist, and also a Pan American Championships medalist. On national level, she is the 2025 Canadian all-around champion.

== Early life ==
Shahbazian was born in Montreal, Quebec in 2004. She began gymnastics at age four, her idols are Russian rhythmic gymnasts Alina Kabaeva and Liasan Utiasheva.

== Career ==
=== Junior ===
Shahbazian was selected for the 2019 Junior Pan American Championships in Monterrey, where she won silver in the team competition.

=== Senior ===
In 2022, she took part in the Pan American Championships in Rio de Janeiro, where she won silver with hoop and bronze with ball and in the team category. In August, she competed at the Commonwealth Games in Birmingham where she won gold in teams along Carmel Kallemaa and Tatiana Cocsanova as well as silver with ball. A month later Shahbazian was selected for the World Championships in Sofia where she ended 35th in the All-Around, 35th with hoop, 30th with ball and 38th with clubs.

In 2024, together with Jana Alemam, Eva Cao, Tatiana Cocsanova, Carmel Kallemaa and Kate Vetricean, she won silver medal in team competition at the 2024 Pacific Rim Championships in Cali, Colombia. She also won bronze medals in Hoop, Clubs and Ribbon finals. Later that year, she won bronze medal in team competition with Kallemaa and Cocsanova at the 2024 Pan American Championships in Guatemala City, Guatemala.

In 2025, she won bronze medal in team competition alongside Pin Rong Lee and Carmel Kallemaa at the 2025 Pan American Championships in Asunción, Paraguay.Team She took 8th place in Hoop, 5th in Ball and Clubs and 6th in Ribbon finals. On July 17–19, she represented Canada at the 2025 Summer Universiade in Essen, Germany, and took 26th place in all-around. Later that month, she competed in the World Cup Challenge Cluj-Napoca and finished 33rd in the all-around. In August, she represented Canada at the 2025 World Championships in Rio de Janeiro, Brazil. She ended on 41st place in all-around qualifications.

In February 2026 she participated to the international tournament Miss Valentine in Tartu, finishing 17th in the all-around. She also took part to the Marbella Grand Prix in March, placing 22nd all-around. In April she competed in the Thiais Grand Prix and finished 19th in the all-around. In June, she took 5th place in all-around at the 2026 Pan American Championships in Rio de Janeiro, qualifying for hoop, clubs and ribbon finals; she then placed 6th, 4th and 7th respectively. She competed at the World Challenge Cup in Cluj-Napoca and finished 30th in the all-around, with hoop being her best score (12th). In July, she then participated to the Milan World Cup and placed 57th all-around. She was supposed to participate to the 2026 World Championships in Frankfurt am Main, but she withdrew due to an injury.

== Routine music information ==
Year	Apparatus	Music title
2026	Hoop	Mean by Persephone
2026	Ball	Goliath by Woodkid / Who Wants To Live Forever by The Tenors
2026	Clubs	Devil and Angel by Maxime Rodriguez
2026	Ribbon	California Dreamin' by 33Tours
2025	Hoop	Vivo Tango by Maxime Rodriguez
2025	Ball	Goliath by Woodkid / Who Wants To Live Forever by The Tenors
2025	Clubs	Royal Blood (as featured in The Redeem Team) by Caleb Swift
2025	Ribbon	California Dreamin' by 33Tours
2024	Hoop	Smooth Criminal by David Garrett
2024	Ball	The End (slowed down + reverbed) by JPOLND
2024	Clubs	Royal Blood (as featured in The Redeem Team) by Caleb Swift
2024	Ribbon	Торо - Ко - Ко Пэк - Пэк by Дидюля
2023	Hoop	Still Loving You by Scorpions
2023	Ball	The End (slowed down + reverbed) by JPOLND
2023	Clubs	Heart Cry Remix by Drehz
2023	Ribbon	Торо - Ко - Ко Пэк - Пэк by Дидюля
2022	Hoop	Still Loving You by Scorpions
2022	Ball	100 Metros by Amaia Montero
2022	Clubs	Heart Cry Remix by Drehz
2022	Ribbon	Night on Bald Mountain by Modest Mussorgsky
