= Viktoria Bogdanova =

Estonian gymnast

Viktoria Bogdanova-Seledtsova
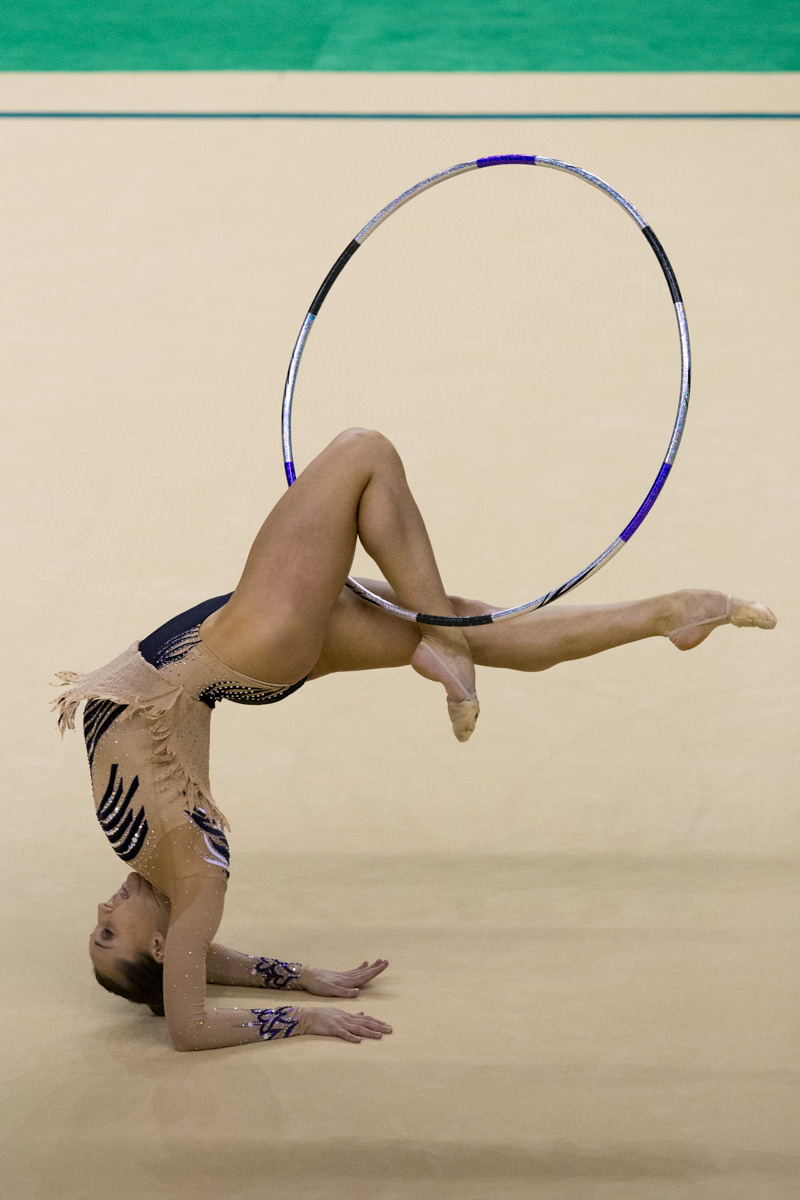
- Born: 24 December 1994 (age 31) Tallinn, Estonia

Gymnastics career
- Discipline: Rhythmic gymnastics
- Country represented: Estonia; (2010-2021)
- Club: VK Excite Dance
Medal record
Representing Estonia
Rhythmic Gymnastics
Summer Universiade
Bronze medal – third place	2019 Naples	Ball

Viktoria Bogdanova-Seledtsova (née Bogdanova; born 24 December 1994), is an Estonian former rhythmic gymnast who now works as a coach.

== Personal life ==
Her twin sister, Olga Bogdanova, is also a gymnast. Both were chosen among the most beautiful gymnasts in the world in 2013. After marriage, she changed her surname to Bogdanova-Seledtsova.

She graduated from Tallinn Läänemere Gymnasium and received a bachelor's degree in physical education and a master's degree in physical education at Tallinn University.

== Career ==
In 2010, at the World Championships in Moscow, Russia, she finished 62nd in qualifying and 23rd in team competition.

In 2011, at the World Championships in Montpellier, France, she was 48th in qualifying and 18th with the team.

The Estonian Gymnastics Association chose her as the best gymnast of 2012.

In 2013 at the World Games of Cali Bogdanova was 16th, while at the World Championships in Kyiv she was 43rd in the All-Around.

In 2014 she participated in the World Cup in Pesaro, where she arrived 27th. At the 2014 World Championships in Izmir, she finished 41st in qualifying and 16th in the team competition.

In 2015 she took part in the World Cup in Sofia, where she finished 29th in the All-Around. At the European Championships in Minsk, she was 15th in the team competition. At the World Championships in Stuttgart, she ended 43rd in qualifying and 18th in the team competition.

In 2016 she participated in the World Cup in Pesaro, where she was 25th. At the Test Event in Rio de Janeiro she arrived 20th, without being able to qualify for the Olympic Games.

In 2017 she took part in the World Cup in Sofia, where she was 25th. She participated in the European Championships in Budapest. At the 22nd Universiade, she arrived 16th.

In 2018 she participated in the World Cup in Pesaro, where she ended 27th, at the World Challenge Cup in Minsk, where she arrived 22nd. At the World Championships in Sofia, she was 40th in the All-Around qualifier and 20th in the team competition.

In 2019 she won a bronze medal in the ball final at the Summer Universiade in Naples, becoming the first Estonian to win a medal in that competition.

At the 2020 European Championships, she finished 14th in the all-around competition for individual gymnasts. She retired after the 2021 World Championships, where she placed 32nd.

== Post-gymnastics career ==
She works as a coach at a club in Tallinn that she founded with her sister.
