= Tatiana Cocsanova =

Canadian rhythmic gymnast

- Born: 16 January 2004 (age 22) Chișinău, Moldova
- Height: 169 cm (5 ft 7 in)

Gymnastics career
- Discipline: Rhythmic gymnastics
- Country represented: Canada; (2018-)
- Club: Questo RG
- Head coach: Natalia Popova
Medal record
Rhythmic Gymnastics
Representing Canada
Pan American Championships
Bronze medal – third place	2023 Guadalajara	Team
Bronze medal – third place	2023 Guadalajara	Ribbon
Bronze medal – third place	2024 Ciudad de Guatemala	Team
Commonwealth Games
Gold medal – first place	2022 Birmingham	Team
Junior Pan American Championships
Silver medal – second place	2019 Monterrey	Team
Pacific Rim Championships
Silver medal – second place	2024 Cali	Team
Bronze medal – third place	2024 Cali	All-Around
Bronze medal – third place	2024 Cali	Clubs

Tatiana Cocsanova (born 16 January 2004) is a Canadian rhythmic gymnast. She is a Commonwealth Games champion and Pan American Championships medalist. On national level, she is a four-time (2021-2024) Canadian national all-around champion.

== Early life ==
In 2004, Cocsanova was born Chișinău, Moldova and later immigrated to Canada. She took up rhythmic gymnastics at age 6.

== Career ==
=== Junior ===
Cocsanova entered the Canadian team in 2018, when she finished in 4th at nationals. In 2019 she competed at Élite Canada finishing 4th in the all-around and ribbon, 5th with clubs and winning bronze medals with rope and ball. At the Canadian championships she was 4th with ball and ribbon, won bronze in the all-around and with rope, and gold with clubs. That year she was selected for the Junior Pan Am Championships in Monterrey, finishing 5th in the rope final and winning team silver.

=== Senior ===
Cocsanova debuted as a senior at the 2020 Élite Canada in Burnaby where she was 6th with ribbon but won bronze in the all-around and with hoop and ball, as well as gold with clubs. Because of the COVID-19 pandemic she returned to competition a year later at nationals, winning all the gold medals apart from a silver with ball.

2022 was her breakout year, Cocsanova won Élite Canada and then took part in the World Cup in Sofia taking 17th place in the all-around and with hoop, 15th with ball, 8th with clubs and 24th with ribbon. In August she competed at the Commonwealth Games in Birmingham where she won team gold alongside Carmel Kallemaa and Suzanna Shahbazian. Later that month she was at the World Cup in Cluj-Napoca, finishing 23rd in the all-around, 24th with hoop, 29th with ball, 25th with clubs and 16th with ribbon. A month later Cocsanova was selected for the World Championships in Sofia where she competed with ribbon and finished 37th.

In 2023 she finished 15th in the All-Around at the World Cup in Tashkent, later she won bronze in teams and with ribbon at the Pan American Championships in Guadalajara. In August she was selected for the World Championships in Valencia where she was 41st in the All-Around, 31st with hoop, 35th with ball, 67th with clubs and 53rd with ribbon.

In 2024, together with Jana Alemam, Eva Cao, Carmel Kallemaa, Suzanna Shahbazian and Kate Vetricean, she won silver medal in team competition at the 2024 Pacific Rim Championships in Cali, Colombia. She also won bronze medal in all-around and clubs. Later that year, she won bronze medal in team competition with Kallemaa and Shahbazian at the 2024 Pan American Championships in Guatemala City, Guatemala. She competed at Milan World Cup and finished on 38th place in all-around.

In May 2025, she announced that she is taking a break from training, due to the recurrence of her back injury from 2022.

== Personal life ==
In her free time, Cocsanova makes videos for her YouTube channel. She studies science at Vanier College in Montreal. Her idols are Russian gymnasts Alina Kabaeva, Margarita Mamun and Aleksandra Soldatova, and Israeli gymnast Linoy Ashram.
