= Louise Christie =

British rhythmic gymnast

- Born: 22 September 2000 (age 26) Aberdeen, Great Britain

Gymnastics career
- Discipline: Rhythmic gymnastics
- Country represented: Great Britain Scotland; (2019-2024)
- Club: Beacon Rhythmic Gymnastics Club
- Head coach: Amy Stewart
Medal record
Rhythmic gymnastics
Representing Scotland
Commonwealth Games
Silver medal – second place	2022 Birmingham	Ribbon

Louise Christie (born 22 September 2000) is a British retired rhythmic gymnast. She is the 2022 Commonwealth Games silver medalist with ribbon.

== Personal life ==
Christie took up the sport at age five after her mother signed her up for gymnastics, not realizing it was rhythmic, and by 2022 she trained for four hours per day. Her gymnastics idols are Salome Pazhava and Linoy Ashram; other athletes she admires are Simone Biles, Tom Daley and Andy Murray, as they had to face challenges to achieve success. She studied Applied Sport & Exercise Science at Robert Gordon University in Aberdeen and graduated in 2023. Following this, she began a master's program in physiotherapy at Queen Margaret University.

== Career ==
Christie was first included in Great Britain's national team in 2019, when she was selected to compete at the Portimão International Tournament. She became the first Scottish gymnast to represent the country since 2013.

In April 2022, she participated in the World Cup in Tashkent, where she was 17th in the all-around, 16th with hoop, 21st with ball, 14th with clubs and 15th with ribbon. Christie then won three medals at the British Championships in Telford: silver in the all-around and with clubs as well as gold with ribbon.

A few weeks later she made her European Championships debut. Christie competed along with her teammates Marfa Ekimova and Alice Leaper, the senior national group, and juniors Melissa Toma, Elizaveta Andreeva and Nicole Kalnina. She performed with hoop, ball and ribbon; she finished in 16th place in the team competition, 45th in the all-around, 60th with hoop, 29th with ball, 39th with ribbon.

In early August, Christie won an historic silver medal with ribbon at the Commonwealth Games in Birmingham, the best results in rhythmic gymnastics for Scotland at the Commonwealth Games. Later in August, she took part in the World Cup in Cluj-Napoca, finishing 32nd in the all-around, 37th with hoop, 34th with ball, 26th with clubs and 34th with ribbon.

Christie competed at her second European Championships in 2023, where she finished 31st in the all-around qualifications.

In 2024, Christie competed at the World Cup in Tashkent but said of her results "it wasn’t my strongest competition" as she was recovering from an ankle sprain. She went on to participate in her third European Championships in May, where she competed with hoop and with clubs. In November, she announced her retirement.

== Achievements ==
- First Scottish rhythmic gymnast to win a silver medal at the Commonwealth Games.
