= Ashari Gill =

Australian rhythmic gymnast

- Born: 29 July 2002 (age 24) Melbourne, Australia

Gymnastics career
- Discipline: Rhythmic gymnastics
- Country represented: Australia
- Gym: Prahran Rhythmic Gymnastics Specialist Centre
- Retired: 2023
Medal record
Representing Australia
Commonwealth Games
Silver medal – second place	2022 Birmingham	Team

Ashari Gill (born 29 July 2002) is an Australian rhythmic gymnast. She won a silver medal in Rhythmic Gymnastics team event, at the 2022 Commonwealth Games.

She competed at the 2018 Australian Championships, 2018 Rhythmic Gymnastics World Championships, 2019 Rhythmic Gymnastics World Championships , and 2022 Oceania Continental Championships.

She trained at the Prahran Rhythmic Gymnastics Specialist Centre.

Gill retired from sports in 2023.
