= National Sports Tribunal =

Sports tribunal in Australia

Statutory authority overview
- Formed: 19 March 2020
- Superseding Statutory authority: Administrative Appeals Tribunal (sport matters only)
- Jurisdiction: Commonwealth of Australia
- Minister responsible: Minister for Sport
- Statutory authority executive: John Boultbee, Chief Executive Officer
- Parent department: Department of Health
- Key document: National Sports Tribunal Act 2019
- Website: www.nationalsportstribunal.gov.au

The National Sports Tribunal is a body established by the National Sports Tribunal Act 2019 to hear and resolve sports-related disputes in Australia. It provides national sporting organisations (and other sporting bodies), athletes and athlete support personnel with "a cost-effective, efficient, and independent forum for resolving sports-related disputes, consistent, transparent and accountable services and a range of resolution methods: arbitration, mediation, conciliation or case appraisal".

The Tribunal was a recommendation of the Report of the Review of Australia's Sports Integrity Arrangements (the Wood review). Previously appeals from the Australian Sports Anti-Doping Authority (ASADA) had been heard by the Administrative Appeals Tribunal. As part of the same package of reforms ASADA was replaced by a new body, Sport Integrity Australia.

John Boultbee was appointed the inaugural Chief Executive Officer on 2 March 2020. The Tribunal began operations on 19 March 2020. The National Sports Tribunal was initially established as a two-year trial to develop capability against demand, and refine operations and services.

== See also ==
- Sports in Australia
