= Marfa Ekimova =

British rhythmic gymnast

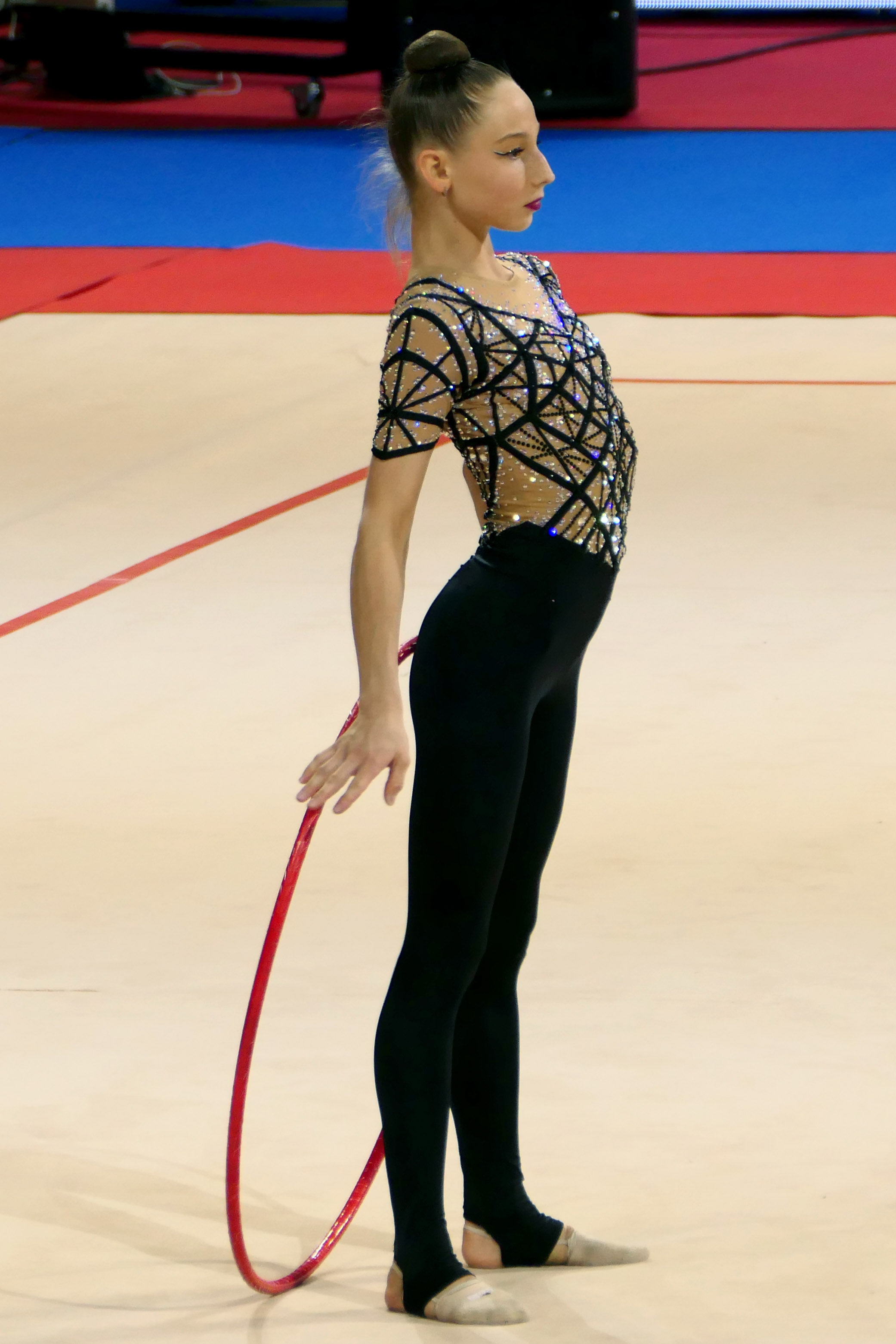
- Ekimova in 2024

Personal information
- Born: 17 January 2005 (age 21) Saint Petersburg, Russia
- Height: 157 cm (5 ft 2 in)

Gymnastics career
- Discipline: Rhythmic gymnastics
- Country represented: Great Britain England; (2021-)
- Club: West London Gymnastics
- Head coaches: Rachel Ennis, Villy Antonova
Medal record
Rhythmic gymnastics
Representing England
Commonwealth Games
Gold medal – first place	2022 Birmingham	All-Around
Bronze medal – third place	2022 Birmingham	Team

Marfa Ekimova (born 17 January 2005) is a Russian-born British rhythmic gymnast. She is the 2022 Commonwealth Games all-around champion and the two-time (2022, 2023) British national champion.

== Personal life ==
Born in Saint Petersburg, Russia, at age two she moved to London, England. She took up gymnastics at age six after having tried different sports, dance and theatre, although she disliked it when she first tried it. She now trains up to eight hours a day.

Ekimova's parents are both musicians, and in her spare time, she enjoys music, especially playing the bassoon and piano. She studied A Level music at Trinity Laban Conservatory. She also studied for her NCFE Level 3 Diploma/Extended Diploma in Sport and Physical Activity at the City of Westminster College and now studies sports management at the University of Westminster. Ekimova speaks English and Russian. Her dream was to compete at the 2024 Olympic Games in Paris.

== Career ==
=== Junior career ===
In 2019, Ekimova was the English junior national champion and the bronze medalist at the British junior national championships. She was initially meant to compete at the junior 2020 European Championships, but she withdrew due to the COVID pandemic.

=== 2021: Senior debut ===
Ekimova debuted as a senior internationally at 2021 European Championships in Varna, representing Great Britain along with her teammates Alice Leaper and Gemma Frizelle. She was 17th in the team competition, 33rd with hoop, 51st with ball and 37th with clubs. In October she was selected for the World Championship in Kitakyushu, where she was 44th in the all-around, 39th with hoop, 53rd with ball, 38th with clubs and 59th with ribbon.

=== 2022: Commonwealth Games Gold ===
In 2022, she became the English senior national champion. Later that month, she also became the British all-around champion and won three of the four apparatus finals.

At the end of May, she competed at the World Cup in Portimão, finishing 30th in the all-around, 21st with hoop, 43rd with ball, 19th with clubs, and 34th with ribbon. In June she took part in the European Championships in Tel Aviv with teammates Louise Christie and Alice Leaper, the senior national groupm and juniors Melissa Toma, Elizaveta Andreeva and Nicole Kalnina. Ekimova was 16th in the team competition with her teammates. Individually, she was 23rd with hoop, 30th with ball, 28th with clubs and 31st in the all-around.

In early August she competed at the Commonwealth Games in Birmingham. She won bronze in the team competition with Alice Leaper and Saffron Severn. In the all-around final, she won a historic gold, becoming the first English gymnast to do so. In the apparatus finals, she was 4th with hoop and ball and 6th with ribbon.

In September she was chosen as to compete at the World Championships in Sofia. She was 38th with hoop and 35th with ball after day one of qualification, but she had to withdraw due to a knee injury that prevented her from walking on the second day of the competition.

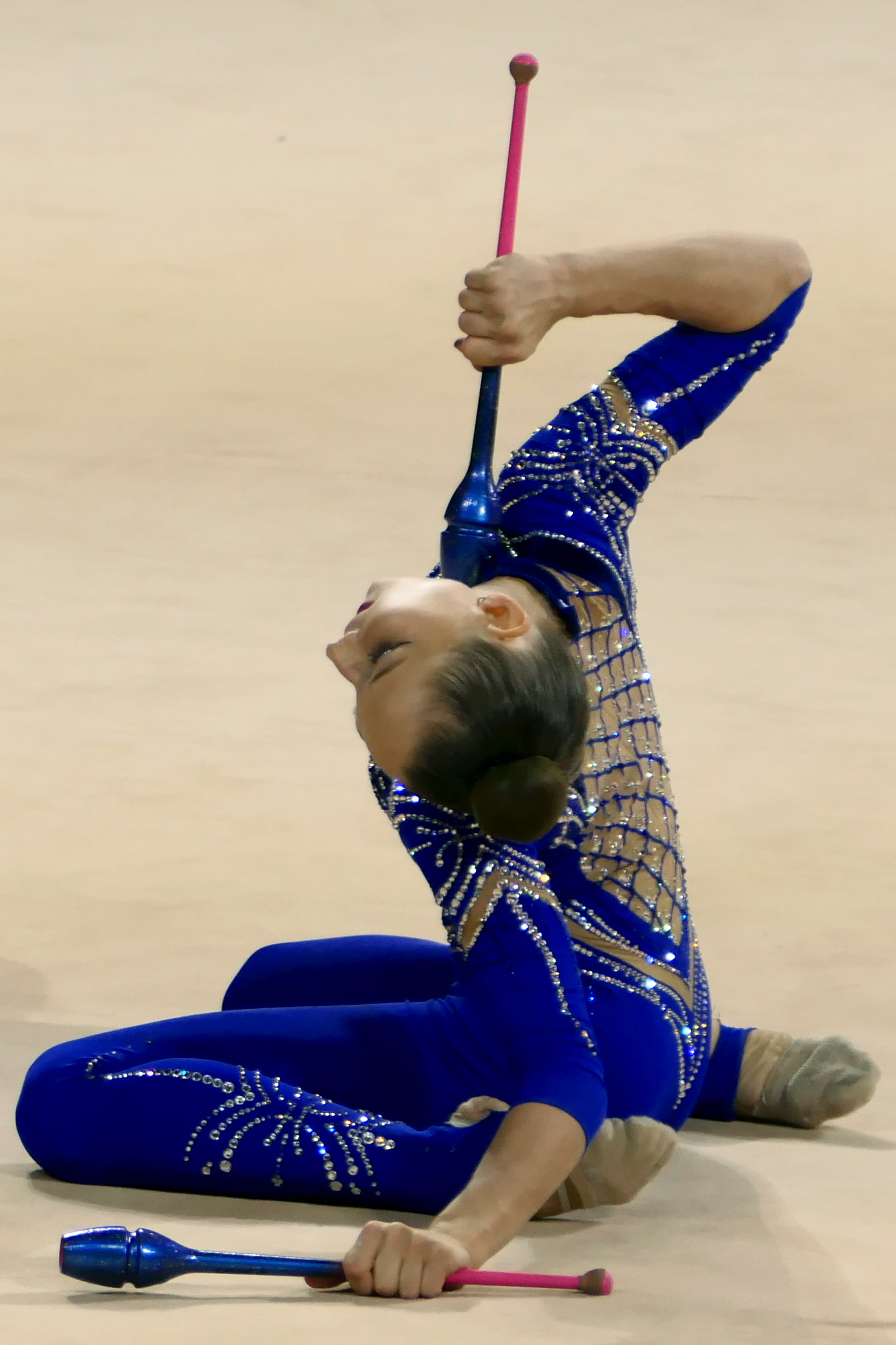
Ekimova's ending pose with clubs at the 2024 Sofia World Cup

=== 2023 ===
In May, Ekimova competed at the 2023 European Championships. She came in 29th place in the all-around. In June, she repeated her English national title, and in July, she defended her British title as well. At the 2023 World Championships in Valencia, she came in 45th place in the all-around qualifications.

=== 2024 ===
Ekimova competed at the 2024 World Cup in Sofia, and she ended 27th in the all-around. She earned a personal best score with each apparatus. At the 2024 European Championships held in Budapest, she came in 28th in the all-around.

=== 2025 ===
In April, she competed at the Sofia World Cup and placed 32nd in the all-around. In May, she represented Great Britain at the 2025 European Championships in Tallinn, where she qualified to the all-around final and finished in 25th place. This was the first time in over 20 years that a contestant from Great Britain has made it to the all-around final, after Hannah McKibbin had done so at the 2002 European Championships.

In July she competed in World Challenge Cup Cluj-Napoca, and finished 30th in the all-around. A month later, Ekimova was selected to compete in the World Championships in Rio de Janeiro, where she came 43rd in the all-around.

== Achievements ==
- First English rhythmic gymnast to win a gold medal in the all-around at the Commonwealth Games.

== Routine music information ==
Year	Apparatus	Music Title
2025	Hoop	Twisted Tales by Power-Haus, Joni Fuller
2025	Ball	Shadow Hunter by Power-Haus, Christian Reindl
2025	Clubs	THE GROTTO / Mind Demons by Audiomachine
2025	Ribbon	Not a Fairytale by Allah Rakha Rahman, Jackie Foster, Brandon Diaz, El Fe' Choir
2024	Hoop	
2024	Ball	
2024	Clubs	Mutation by Cirque du Soleil
2024	Ribbon	Not a Fairytale by Allah Rakha Rahman, Jackie Foster, Brandon Diaz, El Fe' Choir
2023	Hoop	
2023	Ball	Perhaps Perhaps Perhaps by The Pussycat Dolls
2023	Clubs	Mutation by Cirque du Soleil
2023	Ribbon	Not A Fairytale by A. R. Rahman
2022	Hoop	Guerrileros by Maxime Rodriguez
2022	Ball	Perhaps Perhaps Perhaps by The Pussycat Dolls
2022	Clubs	El Conquistador by Maxime Rodriguez
2022	Ribbon	Alma de Guitarra by Banderas
2021	Hoop	Devil and Angel by Maxime Rodriguez
2021	Ball	To Patoma by Alkistis Protopsalti
2021	Clubs	El Conquistador by Maxime Rodriguez
2021	Ribbon	Alma de Guitarra by Banderas
